= List of Southern League team rosters =

Each of the eight teams of Minor League Baseball's Southern League carry a 28-man active roster. Only these players are eligible to play.

Teams may have any number of inactive players on their rosters at a given time who do not count toward active roster limits. Injured players may be placed on the injured list (7-day or 60-day). The temporary inactive list and bereavement list are for players attending to personal matters. Major league players may be placed on rosters for injury rehabilitation for a maximum of 20 days for non-pitchers and 30 days for pitchers.

Players who are ineligible to play due to failure to adhere to the Minor League Drug Prevention and Treatment Program, violations of their contract, who are receiving team disciplinary action, or who are unable to join the team due to visa problems may be placed on the restricted or suspended lists. These players count against a team's active roster limit.

Each team usually has a three-man coaching staff including a manager, hitting coach, and pitching coach. Depending on each Major League Baseball organization's development approach, some teams may have additional coaches.

== North Division ==
=== Birmingham Barons ===
Birmingham Barons roster
Players	Coaches/Other
Pitchers: 12 Eric Adler ~; 34 Nick Altermatt; 25 Luke Bell; 39 Jonathan Clark; 28 Dylan Cumming; 5 Phil Fox; 13 Lucas Gordon; 22 Jacob Heatherly; 38 Jairo Iriarte; 33 Carson Jacobs; 17 Jackson Kelley; 35 Jared Kelley; 15 Connor McCullough; 31 Mark McLaughlin; 30 Jake Palisch *; 36 Jarold Rosado; -- Tommy Vail; Catchers: 21 Jorge Corona; 10 Juan Gonzalez; 20 Calvin Harris; Infielders: 29 Anthony DePino; 14 Drake Logan; 26 Alec Makarewicz; 6 Jason Matthews; 4 Jeral Pérez; 1 Colby Shelton; 18 Jordan Sprinkle; Outfielders: 23 Jacob Burke; 27 Adam Fogel; 7 Wilfred Veras; 2 Samuel Zavala †	Manager: 11 Pat Leyland; Coaches: 24 Aaron Hill (hitting); 16 John Kovalik (pitching); -- Juan Maldonado (performance); 3 Daniel Millwee (bench); 60-day injured list: -- Mason Adams; 7-day injured list; * On Chicago White Sox 40-man roster; ~ Development list; # Rehab assignment; ∞ Reserve list; ‡ Restricted list; § Suspended list; † Temporarily inactive list; Roster updated May 23, 2026; Transactions; → More rosters: MiLB • Southern League; → Chicago White Sox minor league players

=== Chattanooga Lookouts ===
Chattanooga Lookouts roster
Players	Coaches/Other
Pitchers: 23 Kevin Abel; 12 Jose Acuna; 31 Will Cannon; 15 Thomas Farr; 20 Taylor Floyd; 38 Johnathan Harmon; 39 Owen Holt; 1 Bryce Hubbart; 34 Johnathan Lavallee; 14 Jared Lyons; 36 Irvin Machuca; 10 Joseph Menefee; 22 Nate Peterson; 13 Javi Rivera; 15 Nick Sando; 37 Easton Sikorski; Catchers: 45 Cade Hunter; 32 Ryan McCrystal; 47 Diego Omana; 13 Michael Trautwein; Infielders: 16 Johnny Ascanio; 2 Leo Balcazar *; 6 Cam Collier; 4 Trey Faltine; 54 Ruben Ibarra; 30 Carlos Jorge; 19 Dominic Pitelli; 9 Zavier Warren; Outfielders: 11 Jay Allen II; 3 Shane Sasaki	Manager: 24 Jose Moreno; Coaches: 25 Joel Bonnett (pitching); 17 Mike Jacobs (hitting); 33 Caleb Longley (assistant hitting); 21 Reggie Williams (coach); 60-day injured list: -- Connor Burns; 39 Owen Holt; 7-day injured list; * On Cincinnati Reds 40-man roster; ~ Development list; # Rehab assignment; ∞ Reserve list; ‡ Restricted list; § Suspended list; † Temporarily inactive list; Roster updated May 19, 2026; Transactions; → More rosters: MiLB • Southern League; → Cincinnati Reds minor league players

=== Knoxville Smokies ===
Knoxville Smokies roster
Players	Coaches/Other
Pitchers: 32 Jace Beck; 19 Brooks Caple; 33 Nick Dean; 11 Grant Kipp; 45 Jackson Kirkpatrick; 38 Jake Knapp; 12 Luis Martinez-Gomez; 34 Dawson Netz; 21 Tyler Ras; 5 Vince Reilly; 16 Yenrri Rojas; 41 Luis Rujano; 18 Tyler Santana; 43 Marino Santy; 30 Frankie Scalzo Jr.; 20 Tyler Schlaffer; 40 Connor Schultz; 39 Evan Taylor; Catchers: 7 Ariel Armas; 6 Owen Ayers; 3 Ethan Hearn; Infielders: 25 Edgar Alvarez; 12 Hayden Cantrelle; 9 Ed Howard; 15 Devin Ortiz; 2 Jefferson Rojas; 1 Karson Simas; 29 Carter Trice; Outfielders: 22 Andy Garriola; 8 Jordan Nwogu; 13 Alex Ramírez	Manager: 28 Lance Rymel; Coaches: 36 Joe Curci (development); 4 Derron Davis (bench); 27 Joe Dillon (hitting); 24 George Thanopoulos (pitching); 37 José Zapata (pitching); 60-day injured list: -- Brody McCullough; -- Zane Mills; 7-day injured list; * On Chicago Cubs 40-man roster; ~ Development list; # Rehab assignment; ∞ Reserve list; ‡ Restricted list; § Suspended list; † Temporarily inactive list; Roster updated May 21, 2026; Transactions; → More rosters: MiLB • Southern League; → Chicago Cubs minor league players

=== Rocket City Trash Pandas ===
Rocket City Trash Pandas roster
Players	Coaches/Other
Pitchers: 31 Efrain Contreras; 49 Chris Cortez; 16 Ryan Costeiu; 35 Carlos Espinosa; 15 Leonard Garcia; 34 Jose Gonzalez; 52 Austin Gordon; 17 Joel Hurtado; 43 Ryan Johnson *; 46 Lucas Mahlstedt; 23 Camden Minacci; 33 Luke Murphy; 29 Bryce Osmond; 50 Eybersson Polanco; 27 Kenyon Yovan; Catchers: 1 J.J. D'Orazio; -- Alberto Rios ~; Infielders: 8 Harold Coll; 19 Cole Fontenelle; 25 Ben Gobbel; 2 Mac McCroskey; 3 Kyren Paris *; 11 Nick Rodriguez; 24 Arol Vera ~; Outfielders: 4 David Calabrese; 10 Gustavo Campero; 18 Elijah Dunham; 22 Tucker Flint; 32 Matthew Lugo *; 28 Wade Meckler; 14 Raudi Rodriguez	Manager: 13 Joe Kruzel; Coaches: 43 Daren Brown (coach); 48 Doug Henry (pitching); 12 Tony Jaramillo (hitting); 21 Tim Leveque ( pitching); 7-day injured list; * On Los Angeles Angels 40-man roster; ~ Development list; # Rehab assignment; ∞ Reserve list; ‡ Restricted list; § Suspended list; † Temporarily inactive list; Roster updated May 21, 2026; Transactions; → More rosters: MiLB • Southern League; → Los Angeles Angels minor league players

== South Division ==
=== Biloxi Shuckers ===
Biloxi Shuckers roster
Players	Coaches/Other
Pitchers: 25 Patricio Aquino; 53 Ryan Birchard; 16 Jesús Broca; 14 Stiven Cruz; 30 Jaron DeBerry; 17 Anthony Flores; 22 Sam Garcia; 27 Tanner Gillis; 34 Edwin Jiminez; 31 Bishop Letson; 35 Mark Manfredi Sr.; 54 Nick Merkel; 28 Manuel Rodriguez; 33 Cameron Wagoner; 15 Brett Wichrowski; Catchers: 29 Darrien Miller; 19 Edgardo Ordonez; 24 Matthew Wood; Infielders: 3 Mike Boeve; 20 Eric Brown Jr.; 55 Blake Burke; 10 Eduardo Garcia; 12 Jesús Made; 11 Dylan O'Rae; 4 Jheremy Vargas; Outfielders: 1 Dasan Brown; 18 Mark Coley II; 5 Damon Keith	Manager: 13 Mike Guerrero; Coaches: 8 Matt Lipka; 7 Kevin Martir (hitting); 37 Josh Spence (pitching); 23 Tyson Cooper (associate); 60-day injured list: 66 Tyler Bryant; -- Chase Costello; 7-day injured list; * On Milwaukee Brewers 40-man roster; ~ Development list; # Rehab assignment; ∞ Reserve list; ‡ Restricted list; § Suspended list; † Temporarily inactive list; Roster updated May 23, 2026; Transactions; → More rosters: MiLB • Southern League; → Milwaukee Brewers minor league players

=== Columbus Clingstones ===
Columbus Clingstones roster
Players	Coaches/Other
Pitchers: 18 Blayne Abeyta; 33 Garrett Baumann; 17 Lucas Braun; 58 Jack Dashwood; 66 Blayne Enlow; -- Drue Hackenberg; 2 Owen Hackman; 59 Herick Hernandez; 61 Elison Joseph; 51 Tyler LaPorte; 99 Jhancarlos Lara; 46 LJ McDonough; 16 Ian Mejia; 17 Julio Robaina; 26 Shay Schanaman; 52 Samuel Strickland; 60 Luis Vargas; 27 Jacob Wallace *; Catchers: 32 Archer Brookman; 12 Tyler Tolve; Infielders: 45 Drew Compton; 16 Cal Conley; 11 Lizandro Espinoza; 15 Jordan Groshans; 20 Ha-Seong Kim *#; 24 David McCabe; 28 Ambioris Tavarez; 8 Luke Waddell; Outfielders: 23 Patrick Clohisy; 9 Kevin Kilpatrick Jr.; 7 Ethan Workinger	Manager: 4 Nestor Perez; Coaches: 19 Francisco Diaz (coach); 14 Grant Kay (hitting); 22 Mike Steed (pitching); 60-day injured list: 17 Landon Harper (full season); 7-day injured list; * On Atlanta Braves 40-man roster; ~ Development list; # Rehab assignment; ∞ Reserve list; ‡ Restricted list; § Suspended list; † Temporarily inactive list; Roster updated May 21, 2026; Transactions; → More rosters: MiLB • Southern League; → Atlanta Braves minor league players

=== Montgomery Biscuits ===
Montgomery Biscuits roster
Players	Coaches/Other
Pitchers: 30 Alexander Alberto; -- Keyshawn Askew; 24 Jackson Baumeister; 36 Chris Clark; 10 Jonny Cuevas; 38 Derrick Edington; 25 Garrett Edwards; 12 T.J. Fondtain; 33 Michael Forret; 29 Roel Garcia III; 14 Gary Gill Hill; 28 Jackson Lancaster; 44 Tommy McCollum; 17 TJ Nichols; 21 Hayden Snelsire; 34 Santiago Suarez; 31 Owen Wild; Catchers: 13 Kenny Piper; 15 Daniel Vellojin; Infielders: 23 Jadher Areinamo *; 1 Gregory Barrios; 16 Mac Horvath; 11 Xavier Isaac; 3 Kamren James; 10 Will Simpson; 9 Ryan Spikes; 5 Brayden Taylor; Outfielders: 18 Jhon Diaz; -- Noah Myers; 6 Austin Overn	Manager: 22 Kevin Boles; Coaches: 27 Esteban Gonzalez (coach); 26 Braxton Martinez (hitting); 20 Jim Paduch (pitching); 2 Ronnie Richardson (bench); 60-day injured list: 35 Drew Dowd; 25 Jack Hartman; 37 Jacob Watters; 18 Alfredo Zarraga; 7-day injured list; * On Tampa Bay Rays 40-man roster; ~ Development list; # Rehab assignment; ∞ Reserve list; ‡ Restricted list; § Suspended list; † Temporarily inactive list; Roster updated May 19, 2026; Transactions; → More rosters: MiLB • Southern League; → Tampa Bay Rays minor league players

=== Pensacola Blue Wahoos ===
Pensacola Blue Wahoos roster
Players	Coaches/Other
Pitchers: 23 Nigel Belgrave; 21 Gabe Bierman; 19 Kade Bragg; 32 Christian MacLeod; 34 Colby Martin; 30 Karson Milbrandt; 9 Jacob Miller; 37 Luis Moreno; 26 Orlando Ortiz-Mayr; 38 Luis Palacios; 25 Livan Reinoso; 18 Jack Sellinger; 27 Mason Vinyard; 36 Logan Whitaker; 33 Alex Williams; Catchers: 27 Spencer Bramwell; 7 Ryan Ignoffo; 31 Sam Praytor; Infielders: 28 Jay Beshears; 8 Garret Forrester; 10 Payton Green; 4 Cristian Hernández; 14 Dylan Jasso; 6 Ian Lewis Jr.; 12 Gage Miller; 24 Eric Rataczak ~; 20 Michael Snyder; Outfielders: 1 Emaarion Boyd; 5 Brendan Jones; 3 Dillon Lewis; 13 Fenwick Trimble	Manager: 22 Nelson Prada; Coaches: 17 Toby Nagel (pitching); 29 Brian Sharpe (hitting); 2 Mason Sherill (assistant); 15 Cam Vega (defensive); 60-day injured list: -- Xavier Meachem (full season); 32 Will Schomberg (full season); -- Tristan Stevens; 40 Samuel Vásquez; 7-day injured list; * On Miami Marlins 40-man roster; ~ Development list; # Rehab assignment; ∞ Reserve list; ‡ Restricted list; § Suspended list; † Temporarily inactive list; Roster updated May 19, 2026; Transactions; → More rosters: MiLB • Southern League; → Miami Marlins minor league players

== See also ==
- List of Eastern League team rosters
- List of Texas League team rosters
