= Jacksonville Jumbo Shrimp =

Minor League Baseball team

- Founded in 1962; Jacksonville, Florida

Team logo	Cap insignia

Minor league affiliations
- Class: Triple-A (2021–present)
- Previous classes: Double-A (1970–2020); Triple-A (1962–1968)
- League: International League (2021–present)
- Division: East Division
- Previous leagues: Southern League (1970–2020); International League (1962–1968)

Major league affiliations
- Team: Miami Marlins (2009–present)
- Previous teams: Los Angeles Dodgers (2001–2008); Detroit Tigers (1995–2000); Seattle Mariners (1991–1994); Montreal Expos (1984–1990); Kansas City Royals (1972–1983); Cleveland Indians (1971); Milwaukee Brewers (1970); Montreal Expos (1970); New York Mets (1966–1968); St. Louis Cardinals (1964–1965); Cleveland Indians (1962–1963)

Minor league titles
- Class titles (1): 2025
- League titles (8): 1968; 1996; 2001; 2005; 2009; 2010; 2014; 2025
- Division titles (14): 1973; 1974; 1977; 1982; 1983; 1996; 1998; 2000; 2001; 2002; 2005; 2009; 2010; 2014
- First-half titles (9): 1982; 1986; 1996; 1998; 2001; 2005; 2006; 2010; 2025
- Second-half titles (13): 1977; 1982; 1983; 1987; 1990; 1996; 2000; 2001; 2002; 2009; 2010; 2014; 2017

Team data
- Name: Jacksonville Jumbo Shrimp (2017–present)
- Previous names: Jacksonville Suns (1991–2016); Jacksonville Expos (1985–1990); Jacksonville Suns (1962–1968, 1970–1984)
- Colors: Navy, blue, red, shrimp
- Ballpark: VyStar Ballpark (2003–present)
- Previous parks: Sam W. Wolfson Baseball Park (1962–1968, 1970–2002)
- Owner/ Operator: Prospector Baseball Group
- President: Matt Goudreau
- General manager: Matt Goudreau
- Manager: David Carpenter
- Website: milb.com/jacksonville

The Jacksonville Jumbo Shrimp are a Minor League Baseball team of the International League (IL) and the Triple-A affiliate of the Miami Marlins. They are located in Jacksonville, Florida, and are named for shrimp caught in the area. The team plays their home games at VyStar Ballpark, which opened in 2003. They previously played at Sam W. Wolfson Baseball Park from 1962 until the end of the 2002 season.

A team known as the Jacksonville Suns competed in the Triple-A International League from 1962 to 1968. The franchise was relocated to Norfolk, Virginia, as the Tidewater Tides in 1969. After one season without professional baseball, a different Suns team came to the city in 1970 as members of the Double-A Southern League (SL). From 1985 to 1990, the team was known as the Jacksonville Expos during an affiliation with the Montreal Expos, but they returned to the Suns moniker in 1991. The club rebranded as the Jacksonville Jumbo Shrimp before the 2017 season. In conjunction with Major League Baseball's reorganization of Minor League Baseball in 2021, the Jumbo Shrimp were elevated to the Triple-A East, which was renamed the International League in 2022.

Jacksonville won their first IL championship in 1968 as the Triple-A affiliate of the New York Mets. They won the SL championship six times. The first came in 1996 as the Double-A affiliate of the Detroit Tigers. As a farm club for the Los Angeles Dodgers, they won in 2001 and 2005. Three SL titles were won as the Double-A affiliate of the Miami Marlins, including back-to-back championships in 2009 and 2010 and another in 2014. After returning to Triple-A, they won both the IL championship and the Triple-A National Championship in 2025 as an affiliate of the Marlins.

== History ==
Jacksonville, Florida, has hosted professional baseball teams since the late 19th century. Six teams of the Southern League of Colored Base Ballists were based in the city in 1886. An unnamed team played in an early iteration of the Florida State League in 1892. With only a few interruptions from 1904 to 1961, the city was home to such Minor League Baseball teams as the Jays, Tars, and Braves, which played predominantly in the original South Atlantic League ("Sally League"), a predecessor to the modern Southern League. Jacksonville was also home to the Red Caps of the Negro leagues.

=== International League (1962–1968) ===
The first team from the Sunshine State of Florida known as the Jacksonville Suns arrived in the city by way of Havana, Cuba, and Jersey City, New Jersey. Following the Cuban Revolution in 1959, the Havana Sugar Kings of the Triple-A International League (IL) relocated to become the Jersey City Jerseys during the 1960 season. The franchise folded after the 1961 campaign and was bought by a local group headed by Samuel W. Wolfson, previously the owner of the Jacksonville Braves. The Suns played their home games at Jacksonville Baseball Park, which was renamed Sam W. Wolfson Baseball Park after Wolfson's death in 1963.

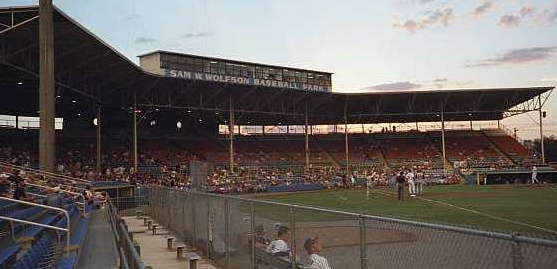
Sam W. Wolfson Baseball Park was home to the Suns from 1962 to 2002.

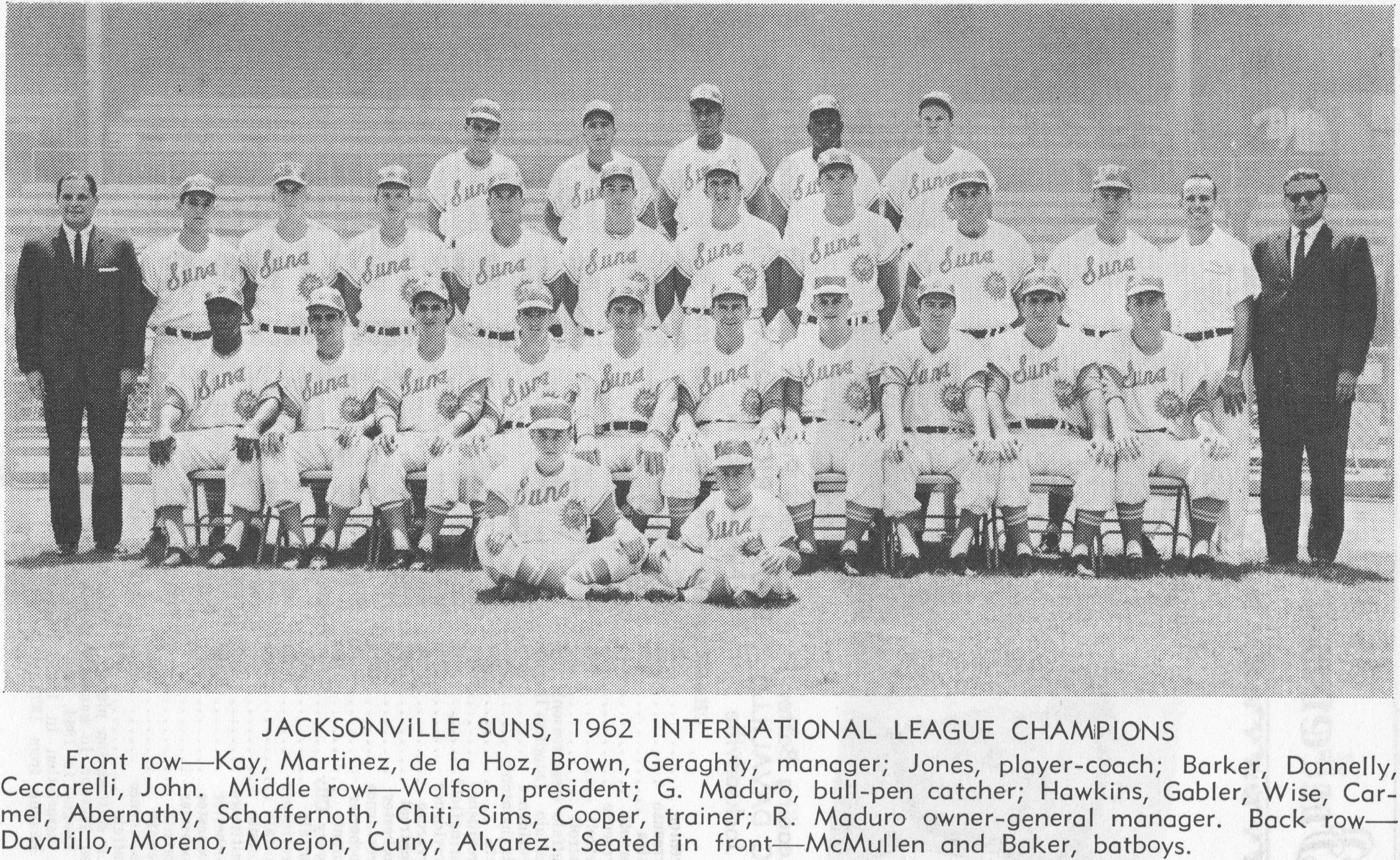
The Jacksonville Suns won the International League pennant in 1962.

As the Triple-A affiliate of the Cleveland Indians, the Suns ended their first season by winning the 1962 International League pennant with a league-best 94–60 record under manager Ben Geraghty. In the Governors' Cup playoffs for the IL championship, they won the semifinals over the Rochester Red Wings but lost the finals to the Atlanta Crackers, 4–3. Shortstop/second baseman Tony Martínez was selected for the IL Most Valuable Player (MVP) Award, and right-hander Joe Schaffernoth won the Most Valuable Pitcher Award.

In 1964, Jacksonville became the top farm club of the St. Louis Cardinals. The team won a second IL pennant that year under manager Harry Walker with an 89–62 season, but they were eliminated in the postseason semifinals by Rochester. Shortstop Joe Morgan was selected as the 1964 league MVP. The Suns switched affiliations to the New York Mets in 1966. During this period, pitchers Tom Seaver (1966) and Nolan Ryan (1967), both future Baseball Hall of Fame inductees, played for the Suns. Skipper Clyde McCullough led the 1968 Suns to win their only IL playoff championship. After defeating the Toledo Mud Hens, 3–1, in the semifinals, they won the league crown over the Columbus Jets, 4–0, in the finals.

When the Milwaukee Braves moved to Atlanta in 1966, the Atlanta Crackers relocated to Richmond, Virginia. This left Jacksonville as the southernmost team in the league, far away from the nearest clubs in Richmond and Louisville, Kentucky. After the 1968 season, the team was relocated to Norfolk, Virginia, as the Tidewater Tides. Jacksonville went without a minor league team in 1969.

=== Southern League (1970–2020) ===
A new Suns team owned by Art Parrack and Marshall Fox began play in 1970 when the Double-A Southern League (SL) added expansion franchises in Jacksonville, and Mobile, Alabama. Jacksonville became the Double-A affiliate of both the Milwaukee Brewers and Montreal Expos for their first Southern League season. They became a Cleveland Indians farm club in 1971 after team was fully owned by Marshall Fox, and then began a much longer affiliation with the Kansas City Royals in 1972, after being sold to Keith Price and Carl Grant.

The Suns made their first Southern League playoff appearance in 1973 behind Manager of the Year Billy Gardner. They won the Eastern Division title but lost the championship finals versus the Montgomery Rebels, 3–1. Jacksonville returned to the playoffs in 1974 via another Eastern Division title but were again denied a championship by the Knoxville Sox, 3–2. By 1977, the SL had begun using a split-season schedule wherein the division winners from each half qualified for the postseason. The Suns won 1977's Second Half Eastern Division title, won the division title over the Savannah Braves, but lost to Montgomery, 2–0, in the finals. Jacksonville made two more appearances in the playoffs with Kansas City but lost in the finals each time. After the 1978 season the team was purchased by Lou Eliopulos. The 1982 team won both halves of the season with a league-best 83–61 record under Manager of the Year Gene Lamont, but they ultimately lost the championship to the Nashville Sounds, 3–1. The 1983 second-half champion Suns lost in the finals, 3–1, to the Birmingham Barons. Outfielder John Morris was selected as the 1983 Southern League MVP.

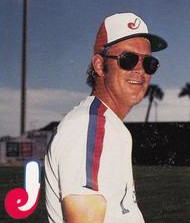
Manager of the Year Tommy Thompson's 1987 Expos led the SL with an 85–59 record.

Jacksonville became the Double-A affiliate of the Montreal Expos in 1984. After being purchased by Peter Bragan Sr. and his family from Lou Eliopulos in 1984, the team was renamed the Jacksonville Expos. Much like in the previous affiliation, the Expos made four playoff appearances in seven seasons with Montreal but were eliminated in the Eastern Division series on each occasion (1986, 1987, 1988, and 1990). Individual players and managers, however, garnered several league awards during this period. First baseman Andrés Galarraga was the 1984 Southern League MVP, and skipper Rick Renick was the season's Manager of the Year. Tommy Thompson was recognized as the top manager for 1987 after leading the Expos to a league-best 85–59 record. Starting pitcher Brian Holman won the 1987 Most Outstanding Pitcher Award. Two other notable players to appear for Jacksonville in 1987 were future National League MVP Larry Walker and future Hall of Famer Randy Johnson. In 1990, starter Brian Barnes was the Most Outstanding Pitcher, and Jerry Manuel was the Manager of the Year.

Upon switching affiliation to the Seattle Mariners in 1991, the team reverted to its Suns moniker. Over four seasons with Seattle, the Suns never qualified for the playoffs. Right-hander Jim Converse won the 1992 Most Outstanding Pitcher Award after leading the Southern League with 157 strikeouts. Future major league All-Stars Alex Rodriguez (1994) and Bret Boone (1991) came through Jacksonville during the Mariners affiliation.

The Detroit Tigers became the parent club of the Suns in 1995. Behind the leadership of managers Bill Plummer and Larry Parrish, the 1996 Suns won both halves of the season and then the Eastern Division title over the Carolina Mudcats. They went on to defeat the Chattanooga Lookouts, 3–1, to win their first Southern League championship and first league title since 1968. The Detroit-affiliated Suns reached the championship finals twice more but lost to the Mobile BayBears in 1998 and West Tenn Diamond Jaxx in 2000. Outfielder Gabe Kapler won the 1998 MVP Award after leading the league in home runs (28), hits (176), runs (113), doubles (47), RBI (146), total bases (319, and sacrifice flies (11). Closer Francisco Cordero, the league's saves leader (27), was 1999's Most Outstanding Pitcher.

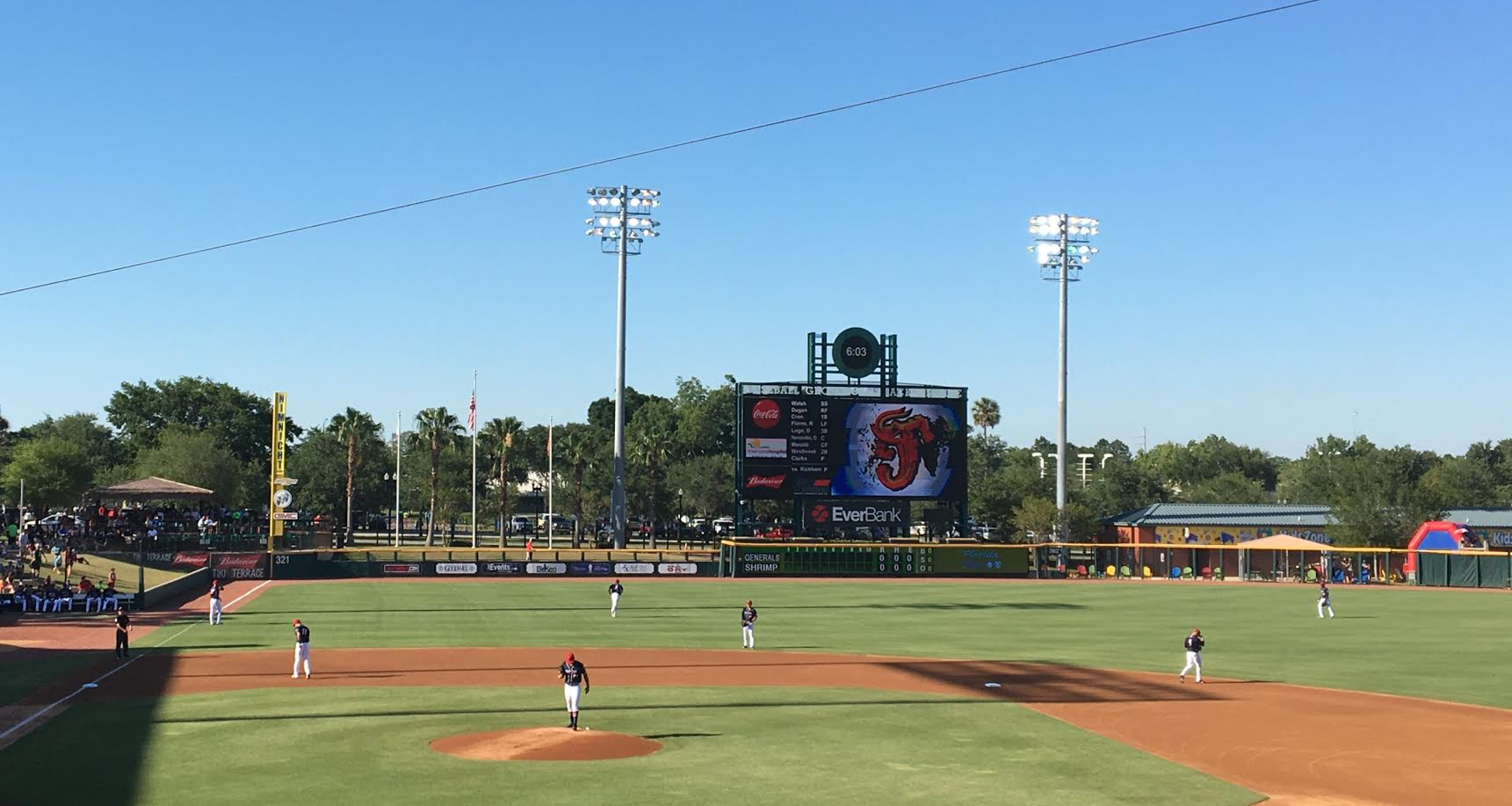
The Jumbo Shrimp have played at VyStar Ballpark since 2003.

Jacksonville affiliated with the Los Angeles Dodgers in 2001. Manager of the Year John Shoemaker's 2001 club paced the league with an 83–56 mark, winning both halves of the season. They bested Chattanooga, 3–2, to advance to the finals against the Huntsville Stars, but the September 11 terrorist attacks brought a halt to the championship series before it began. Jacksonville and Huntsville were declared co-champions. The 2002 season was the Suns' last year at Wolfson Park. They moved into the newly constructed Baseball Grounds of Jacksonville, later renamed 121 Financial Ballpark, at the start of the 2003 season, and VyStar Ballpark for the 2025 season. The 11,000-seat, US$34-million venue was created as part of the Better Jacksonville Plan. The 2002 team made a bid to win the championship outright but was swept by Birmingham in the best-of-five finals. Starter Joel Hanrahan was 2003's Most Outstanding Pitcher. With Shoemaker still at the helm, the Suns won the first half title before sweeping Birmingham, 3–0, in the Southern Division series. They went on to win their third Southern League championship over West Tenn, 3–1. Though the 2006 club was eliminated by the Montgomery Biscuits in the division series, Shoemaker won his second Manager of the Year Award, and Spike Lundberg was selected as the league's Most Outstanding Pitcher.

Jacksonville entered into a new affiliation with the Florida Marlins in 2009; the MLB team became the Miami Marlins in 2012. The relationship got off to an auspicious start as the Suns won back-to-back Southern League championships. Brandon Hyde's 2009 second-half winners swept Birmingham for the Southern Division title then defeated the Tennessee Smokies, 3–1, in the finals for the championship win. Tim Leiper took over managerial duties for the 2010 season. After winning both halves of the season with an 81–59 record, Jacksonville bested Mobile, 3–1, in the division series before knocking off Tennessee, 3–1, for the second-straight year in the championship round. Tom Koehler won that season's Most Outstanding Pitcher Award. In 2014, the Suns finished the regular season on a ten-game winning streak, edging out the Mississippi Braves by one game to win the second half title. Including the playoffs, the Suns won 16 of their final 17 games en route to winning the Southern Division title over Mobile and their sixth and final Southern League championship over Chattanooga, 3–0. Justin Nicolino was recognized as the league's Most Outstanding Pitcher.

The Bragan family sold the franchise to Ken Babby of Fast Forward Sports Group in 2015. The Suns rebranded after the 2016 season, becoming the Jacksonville Jumbo Shrimp. The name combines shrimping, which is popular on Jacksonville's St. Johns River, with the sentiment that Jacksonville, Florida's largest city, still has a small-town feel, hinting at the moniker's oxymoronic nature. The 2017 team won a second half title, but they lost the Southern Division to the Pensacola Blue Wahoos. The start of the 2020 season was postponed due to the COVID-19 pandemic before being cancelled on June 30.

In December 2025, Ken Babby sold the team to Prospector Baseball Group.

=== International League (2021–present) ===
Since the move to VyStar Ballpark, the Suns have consistently been at or near the top of their league in attendance. This success led to speculation that the team could return to the Triple-A level in the future. In conjunction with Major League Baseball's reorganization of the minor leagues after the 2020 season, the Jumbo Shrimp were selected to move up to the Triple-A classification—making them the only active Florida-based team at that level—and continue as affiliates of the Miami Marlins in 2021. They were placed in the 20-team Triple-A East. Jacksonville began competition in the new league on May 4 with an 11–5 victory over the Norfolk Tides at then–121 Financial Ballpark. They ended the season in second place in the Southeastern Division with a 69–51 record. No playoffs were held to determine a league champion; instead, the team with the best regular-season record was declared the winner. However, 10 games that had been postponed from the start of the season were reinserted into the schedule as a postseason tournament called the Triple-A Final Stretch in which all 30 Triple-A clubs competed for the highest winning percentage. Jacksonville finished the tournament tied for seventh place with a 6–4 record. In 2022, the Triple-A East became known as the International League, the name historically used by the regional circuit prior to the 2021 reorganization.

The Jumbo Shrimp qualified for the 2025 postseason with a first-half title win. They defeated the Scranton/Wilkes-Barre RailRiders, 2–1 in a best-of-three series, to win the International League championship. The Jumbo Shrimp traveled to Las Vegas to play the Las Vegas Aviators in the Triple-A National Championship Game at Las Vegas Ballpark on September 27. Jacob Berry hit a walk-off two-run home run in the bottom of the ninth inning to win the game for Jacksonville, 8–7.

== Season-by-season records ==
Key
League	The team's final position in the league standings
Division	The team's final position in the divisional standings
GB	Games behind the team that finished in first place in the division that season
‡	Class champions (1962–present)
†	League champions (1962–present)
*	Division champions (1963–2022)
^	Postseason berth (1962–present)

Season-by-season records
Season	League	Regular-season					Postseason			MLB affiliate	Ref.
Season	League	Record	Win %	League	Division	GB	Record	Win %	Result	MLB affiliate	Ref.
1962^	IL	94–60	.610	1st	—	—	7–7	.500	Result	Won IL pennant Won semifinals vs. Rochester Red Wings, 4–3; Lost IL championship vs. Atlanta Crackers, 4–3	Cleveland Indians
1963	IL	56–91	.381	10th	5th	27	—	—	—	Cleveland Indians	
1964^	IL	89–62	.589	1st	—	—	0–4	.000	Won IL pennant Lost semifinals vs. Rochester Red Wings, 4–0	St. Louis Cardinals	
1965	IL	71–76	.483	6th	—	14 1/2	—	—	—	St. Louis Cardinals	
1966	IL	68–79	.463	7th	—	15	—	—	—	New York Mets	
1967	IL	66–73	.475	5th	—	14	—	—	—	New York Mets	
1968^ †	IL	75–71	.514	4th	—	7 1/2	7–1	.875	Won semifinals vs. Toledo Mud Hens, 3–1; Won IL championship vs. Columbus Jets, 4–0	New York Mets	
1970	SL	67–70	.489	5th	—	11	—	—	—	Milwaukee Brewers (Note: In 1970, the Suns had a dual affiliation with the Milwaukee Brewers and Montreal Expos.); Montreal Expos	
1971	DA	63–77	.450	10th (tie)	4th	28	—	—	—	Cleveland Indians	
1972	SL	64–75	.460	6th	4th	17	—	—	—	Kansas City Royals	
1973 *	SL	76–60	.559	2nd	1st	—	1–3	.250	Won Eastern Division title Lost SL championship vs. Montgomery Rebels, 3–1	Kansas City Royals	
1974 *	SL	78–60	.565	1st	1st	—	2–3	.400	Won Eastern Division title Lost SL championship vs. Knoxville Sox, 3–2	Kansas City Royals	
1975	SL	59–79	.428	8th	4th	22	—	—	—	Kansas City Royals	
1976	SL	66–72	.478	6th	4th	8 1/2	—	—	—	Kansas City Royals	
1977^ *	SL	72–66	.522	4th	3rd	4 1/2	2–3	.400	Won Second-Half Eastern Division title Won Eastern Division title vs. Savannah Braves, 2–1; Lost SL championship vs. Montgomery Rebels, 2–0	Kansas City Royals	
1978	SL	73–69	.514	3rd	2nd	8 1/2	—	—	—	Kansas City Royals	
1979	SL	69–72	.489	6th	3rd	14	—	—	—	Kansas City Royals	
1980	SL	63–81	.438	8th	5th	14	—	—	—	Kansas City Royals	
1981	SL	65–77	.458	8th	5th	14	—	—	—	Kansas City Royals	
1982^ *	SL	83–61	.576	1st	1st	—	4–4	.500	Won First and Second-Half Eastern Division titles Won Eastern Division title vs. Columbus Astros, 3–1; Lost SL championship vs. Nashville Sounds, 3–1	Kansas City Royals	
1983^ *	SL	77–68	.531	4th	2nd	4	4–4	.500	Won Second-Half Eastern Division title Won Eastern Division title vs. Savannah Braves, 3–1; Lost SL championship vs. Birmingham Barons, 3–1	Kansas City Royals	
1984	SL	76–69	.524	3rd	3rd	6	—	—	—	Montreal Expos	
1985	SL	73–70	.510	5th	3rd	5 1/2	—	—	—	Montreal Expos	
1986^	SL	75–68	.524	2nd	1st	—	1–3	.250	Won First-Half Eastern Division title Lost Eastern Division title vs. Columbus Astros, 3–1	Montreal Expos	
1987^	SL	85–59	.590	1st	1st	—	2–3	.400	Won Second-Half Eastern Division title Lost Eastern Division title vs. Charlotte O's, 3–2	Montreal Expos	
1988^	SL	69–73	.486	5th	2nd	17	2–3	.400	Lost Eastern Division title vs. Greenville Braves, 3–2	Montreal Expos	
1989	SL	68–76	.472	7th	5th	11	—	—	—	Montreal Expos	
1990^	SL	84–60	.583	2nd	2nd	1	1–3	.250	Won Second-Half Eastern Division title Lost Eastern Division title vs. Orlando SunRays, 3–1	Montreal Expos	
1991	SL	74–69	.517	4th	3rd	13 1/2	—	—	—	Seattle Mariners	
1992	SL	68–75	.476	7th	3rd	32	—	—	—	Seattle Mariners	
1993	SL	59–81	.421	10th	5th	15	—	—	—	Seattle Mariners	
1994	SL	60–77	.438	9th	4th	13 1/2	—	—	—	Seattle Mariners	
1995	SL	75–69	.521	5th	3rd	14	—	—	—	Detroit Tigers	
1996^ * †	SL	75–63	.543	3rd	1st	—	6–3	.667	Won First and Second-Half Eastern Division titles Won Eastern Division title vs. Carolina Mudcats, 3–2; Won SL championship vs. Chattanooga Lookouts, 3–1	Detroit Tigers	
1997	SL	66–73	.475	8th	3rd	9 1/2	—	—	—	Detroit Tigers	
1998^ *	SL	86–54	.614	1st (tie)	1st	—	4–3	.571	Won First-Half Eastern Division title Won Eastern Division title vs. Knoxville Smokies, 3–0; Lost SL championship vs. Mobile BayBears, 3–1	Detroit Tigers	
1999	SL	75–66	.532	3rd	1st	—	—	—	—	Detroit Tigers	
2000^ *	SL	69–71	.493	5th	2nd	2	5–5	.500	Won Second-Half Eastern Division title Won Eastern Division title vs. Greenville Braves, 3–2; Lost SL championship vs. West Tenn Diamond Jaxx, 3–2	Detroit Tigers	
2001^ * †	SL	83–56	.597	1st	1st	—	3–2	.600	Won First and Second-Half Eastern Division titles Won Eastern Division title vs. Chattanooga Lookouts, 3–2; Declared SL champions with Huntsville Stars (Note: The 2001 playoffs were cancelled in the wake the September 11 terrorist attacks. With no games having been played, Jacksonville and Huntsville were declared co-champions.)	Los Angeles Dodgers	
2002^ *	SL	77–62	.554	2nd	1st	—	3–5	.375	Won Second-Half Eastern Division title Won Eastern Division title vs. Carolina Mudcats, 3–2; Lost SL championship vs. Birmingham Barons, 3–0	Los Angeles Dodgers	
2003	SL	66–73	.475	6th	4th	14 1/2	—	—	—	Los Angeles Dodgers	
2004	SL	66–71	.482	7th	4th	19 1/2	—	—	—	Los Angeles Dodgers	
2005^ * †	SL	79–61	.564	4th	2nd	3 1/2	6–1	.857	Won First-Half Southern Division title Won Southern Division title vs. Birmingham Barons, 3–0; Won SL championship vs. West Tenn Diamond Jaxx, 3–1	Los Angeles Dodgers	
2006^	SL	86–54	.614	1st	1st	—	0–3	.000	Won First-Half Southern Division title Lost Southern Division title vs. Montgomery Biscuits, 3–0	Los Angeles Dodgers	
2007	SL	80–60	.571	2nd	2nd	1	—	—	—	Los Angeles Dodgers	
2008	SL	68–72	.486	7th	4th	7 1/2	—	—	—	Los Angeles Dodgers	
2009^ * †	SL	82–58	.586	2nd	2nd	10 1/2	6–1	.857	Won Second-Half Southern Division title Won Southern Division title vs. Birmingham Barons, 3–0; Won SL championship vs. Tennessee Smokies, 3–1	Florida Marlins	
2010^ * †	SL	81–59	.579	2nd	1st	—	6–2	.750	Won First and Second-Half Southern Division titles Won Southern Division title vs. Mobile BayBears, 3–1; Won SL championship vs. Tennessee Smokies, 3–1	Florida Marlins	
2011	SL	70–70	.500	5th	3rd	15	—	—	—	Florida Marlins	
2012	SL	70–70	.500	5th	2nd	5 1/2	—	—	—	Miami Marlins	
2013	SL	73–63	.537	5th	3rd	4 1/2	—	—	—	Miami Marlins	
2014^ * †	SL	81–59	.579	2nd	2nd	2 1/2	6–1	.857	Won Second-Half Southern Division title Won Southern Division title vs. Mobile BayBears, 3–1; Won SL championship vs. Chattanooga Lookouts, 3–0	Miami Marlins	
2015	SL	57–81	.413	9th	5th	21 1/2	—	—	—	Miami Marlins	
2016	SL	63–76	.453	8th	5th	17 1/2	—	—	—	Miami Marlins	
2017^	SL	69–71	.493	6th (tie)	3rd	5	0–3	.000	Won Second-Half Southern Division title Lost Southern Division title vs. Pensacola Blue Wahoos, 3–0	Miami Marlins	
2018	SL	55–82	.401	10th	5th	24 1/2	—	—	—	Miami Marlins	
2019	SL	66–71	.482	5th	3rd	15	—	—	—	Miami Marlins	
2020	SL	Season cancelled (COVID-19 pandemic)								Miami Marlins	
2021	AAAE	75–55 (Note: In 2021, the team with the best record at the end of the regular-season was declared the Triple-A East champion. Jacksonville had a 69–51 (.575) record, eight games behind first place, which put them 4th (tie) in the league and 2nd in their division. The regular-season was followed by the Triple-A Final Stretch, a 10-game postseason tournament in which all 30 Triple-A clubs competed for the highest winning percentage. Jacksonville finished the tournament tied for 7th place with a 6–4 (.600) record.)	.577	5th	2nd	11	—	—	—	Miami Marlins	
2022	IL	80–69	.537	6th	3rd	5 1/2	—	—	—	Miami Marlins	
2023	IL	70–79	.470	15th	7th	20	—	—	—	Miami Marlins	
2024	IL	73–76	.490	10th	5th	16	—	—	—	Miami Marlins	
2025^ † ‡	IL	89–61	.593	1st	1st	—	3–1	.750	Won first-half title Won IL championship vs. Scranton/Wilkes-Barre RailRiders, 2–1; Won Triple-A championship vs. Las Vegas Aviators, 1–0	Miami Marlins	
2026	IL	73–74	.497	13th	6th	16 1/2	—	—	—	Miami Marlins	
Totals	—	4,563–4,355	.512	—	—	—	81–71	.533	—	—	—

== Radio and television ==
Scott Kornberg has been the play-by-play announcer for Jumbo Shrimp games since 2020. Live audio broadcasts are available online through the team's website, on WOKV 690 AM, and the MiLB First Pitch app. Games can be viewed through the MiLB.TV subscription feature of the official website of Minor League Baseball, with audio provided by a radio simulcast.

== Roster ==
Jacksonville Jumbo Shrimp roster
Players	Coaches/Other
Pitchers: 45 Jace Beck; 23 Brandan Bidois *; 18 Zach Brzykcy *; 29 Wikelman González *; 39 Holt Jones; 40 Stephen Jones; 7 Justin King ~; 33 Christian MacLeod; 25 Karson Milbrandt; 21 Patrick Monteverde *; 28 Luis Palacios; 41 Zach Pop; 36 Matt Pushard; 27 Jake Walkinshaw; 34 Brandon White; 24 Josh White *; 26 Amos Willingham; Catchers: 15 Logan Driscoll *; 9 Bennett Hostetler; Infielders: 11 Maximo Acosta *; 19 Garret Forrester; 20 Jonathon Long; 6 Juan Matheus; 2 Gage Miller; 5 Johnny Olmstead; Outfielders: 12 Kemp Alderman; 1 Cam Cannarella; 10 Brandon Compton; 3 Matthew Etzel; 29 Rece Hinds *; 17 Brendan Jones; 4 Andrew Pintar; 8 Brayden Taylor	Manager: 38 David Carpenter; Coaches: 30 Jose Ceballos (assistant); -- Tom DeAngelis (hitting); 43 Jerad Eickhoff (pitching); 13 Luke Terwilliger (assistant); 60-day injured list: 9 Bennett Hostetler (paternity); 75 Evan McKendry; 38 Jesús Tinoco (full season); 39 Thomas White; 7-day injured list; * On Miami Marlins 40-man roster; ~ Development list; # Rehab assignment; ∞ Reserve list; ‡ Restricted list; § Suspended list; † Temporarily inactive list; Roster updated September 15, 2026; Transactions; → More rosters: MiLB • International League; → Miami Marlins minor league players

== Awards ==
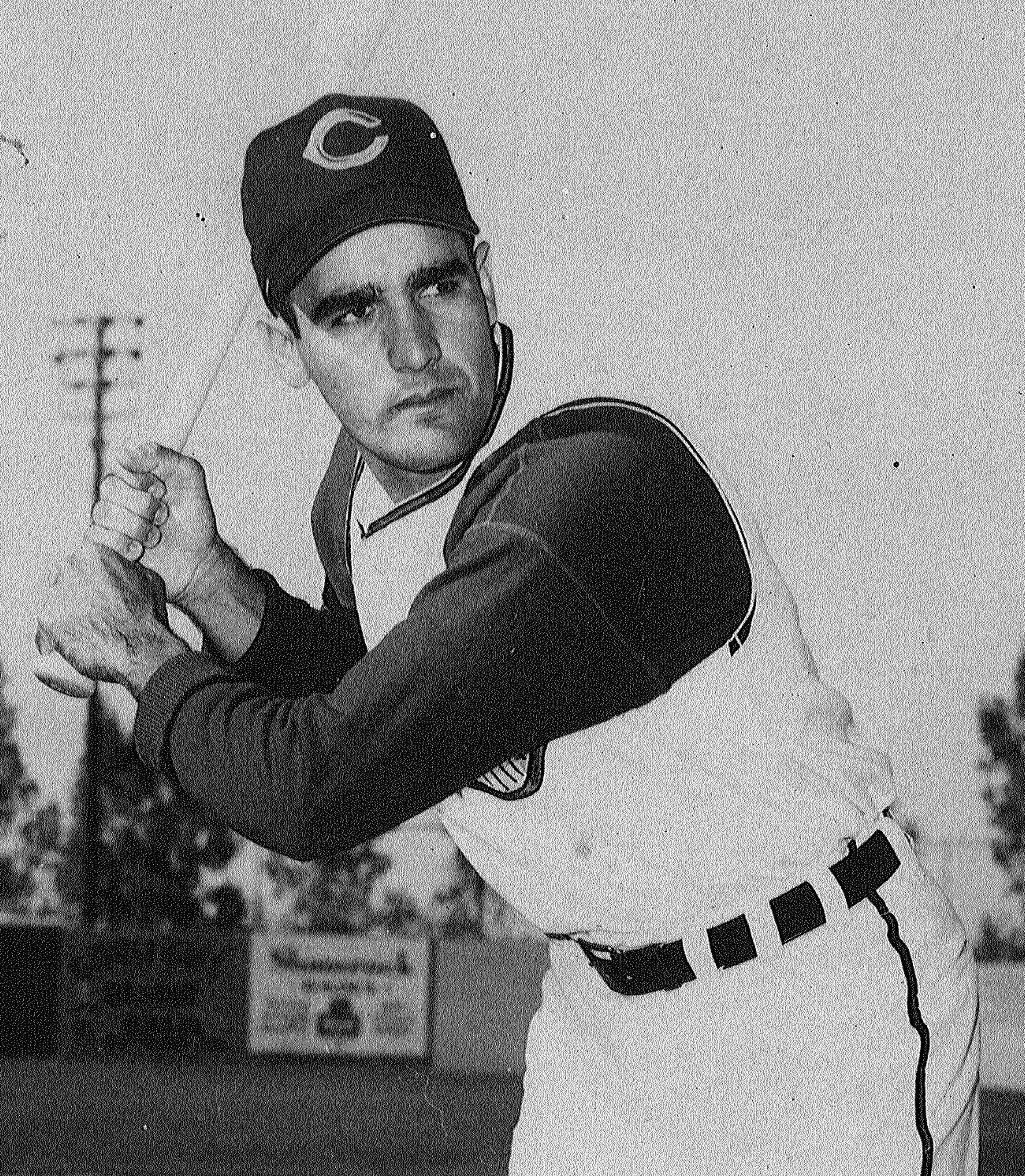
Tony Martínez won the IL Most Valuable Player Award in 1962.

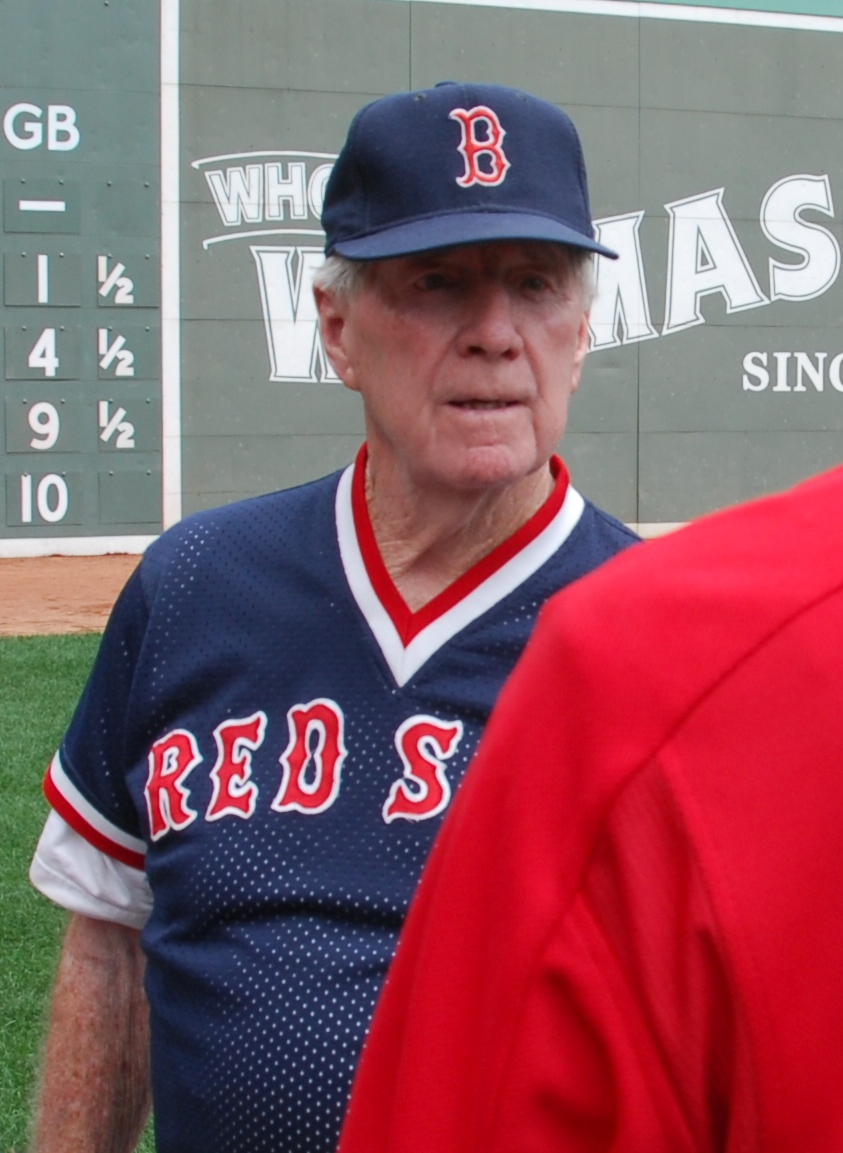
Joe Morgan won the IL Most Valuable Player Award in 1964.

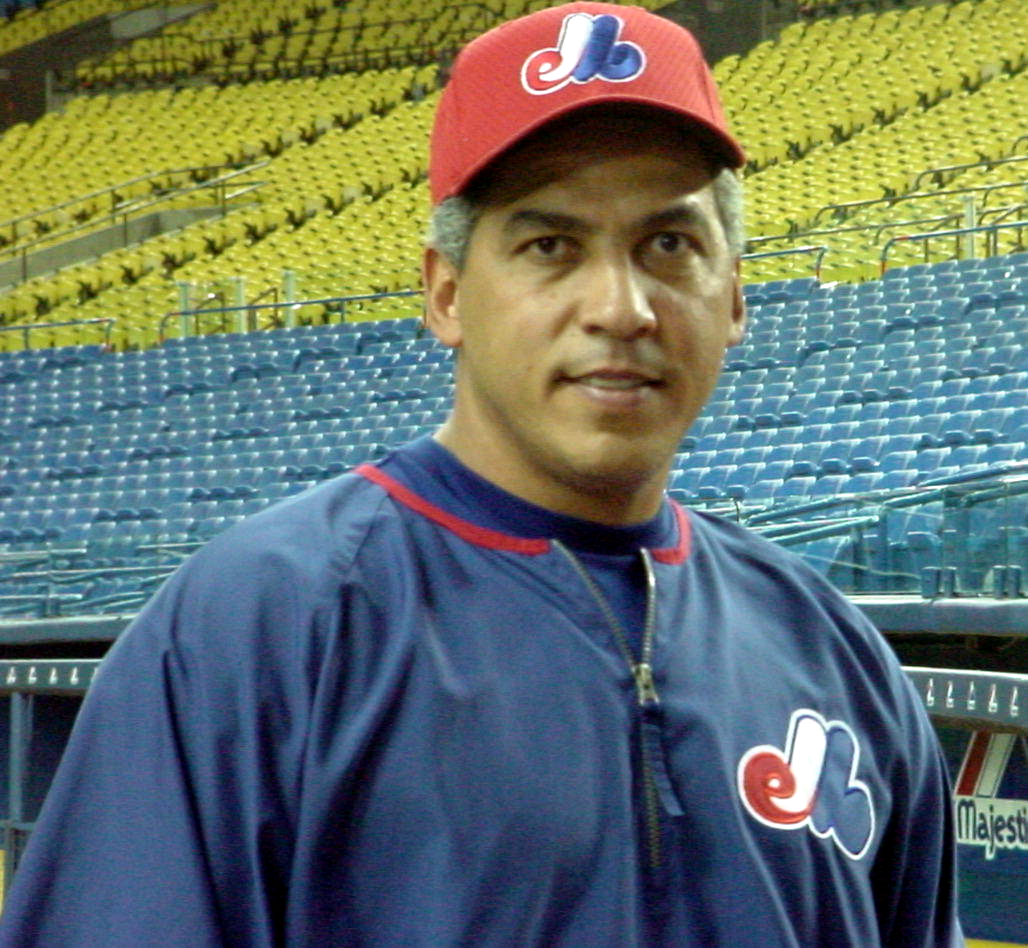
Andrés Galarraga won the SL Most Valuable Player Award in 1984.

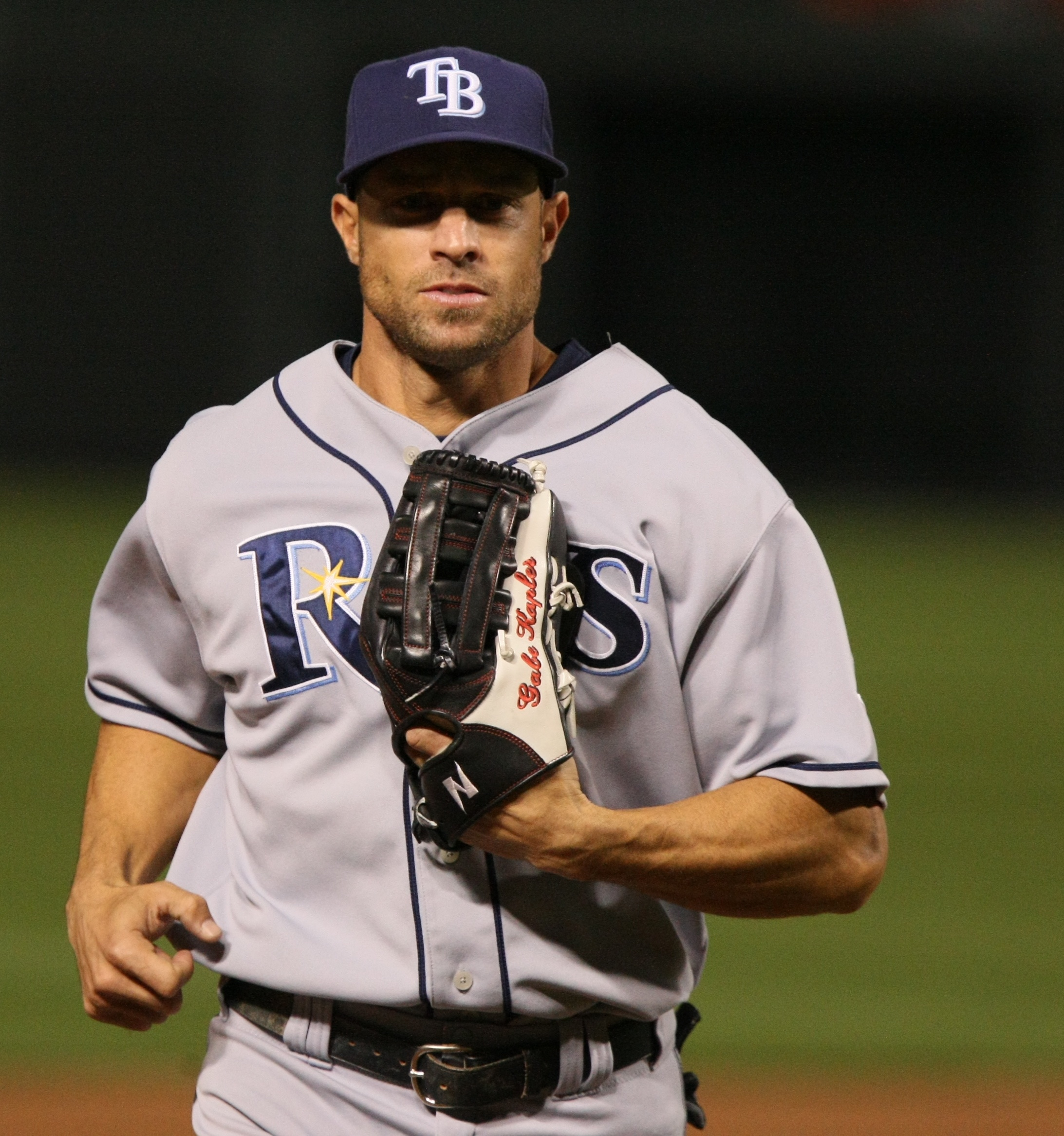
Gabe Kapler won the SL Most Valuable Player Award in 1998.

Fourteen players, six managers, and six executives have won league awards in recognition for their performance with Jacksonville.

International League Awards
Award	Recipient	Season	Ref.
Most Valuable Player	Tony Martínez	1962	
Most Valuable Player	Joe Morgan	1964	
Most Valuable Pitcher	Joe Schaffernoth	1962	

Southern League Awards
Award	Recipient	Season	Ref.
Most Valuable Player	John Morris	1983	
Most Valuable Player	Andrés Galarraga	1984	
Most Valuable Player	Gabe Kapler	1998	
Most Outstanding Pitcher	Brian Holman	1987	
Most Outstanding Pitcher	Brian Barnes	1990	
Most Outstanding Pitcher	Jim Converse	1992	
Most Outstanding Pitcher	Francisco Cordero	1999	
Most Outstanding Pitcher	Joel Hanrahan	2003	
Most Outstanding Pitcher	Spike Lundberg	2006	
Most Outstanding Pitcher	Tom Koehler	2010	
Most Outstanding Pitcher	Justin Nicolino	2014	
Manager of the Year	Billy Gardner	1973	
Manager of the Year	Gene Lamont	1982	
Manager of the Year	Rick Renick	1984	
Manager of the Year	Tommy Thompson	1987	
Manager of the Year	Jerry Manuel	1990	
Manager of the Year	John Shoemaker	2001	
Manager of the Year	John Shoemaker	2006	
Executive of the Year	Peter Bragan Jr.	1987	
Executive of the Year	Peter Bragan Jr.	2003	
Executive of the Year	Chris Peters	2014	
Executive of the Year	Harold Craw	2017	
Woman of the Excellence	Karlie Evatt	2007	
Woman of the Excellence	January Squyres	2012	
Woman of the Excellence	Barbara O'Berry	2013	

== See also ==
- Jacksonville Jumbo Shrimp players (2017–present)
- Jacksonville Suns players (1962–1968, 1970–1984, 1991–2016)
- Jacksonville Expos players (1985–1990)
