= List of International League team rosters =

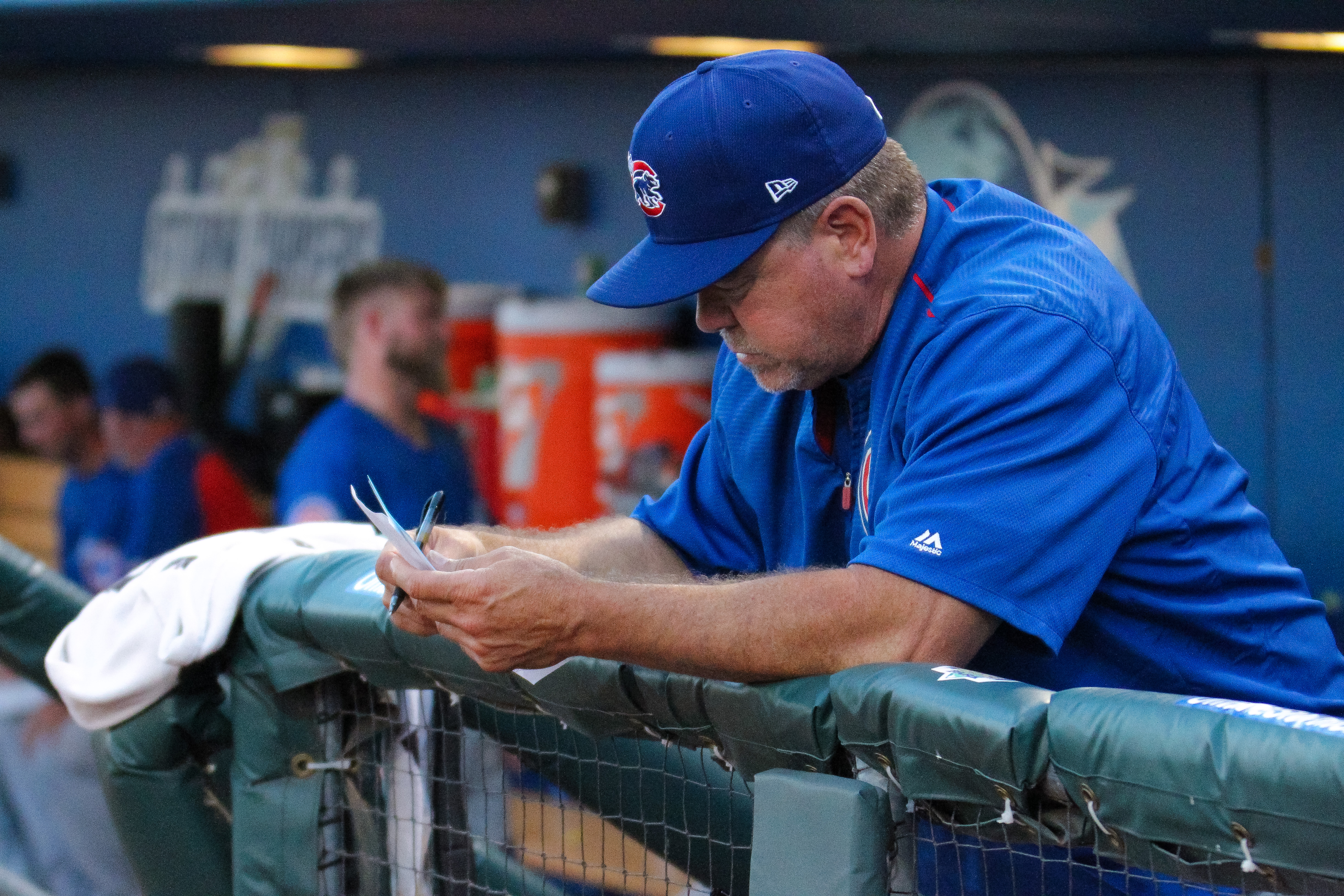
A manager looking over the batting lineup made from his team's active roster

Each of the 20 teams of Minor League Baseball's International League carry a 28-man active roster. Only these players are eligible to play. Teams may have additional players on their rosters who are inactive and do not count toward active roster limits provided no more than 38 players are on the roster at any given time.

Injured players may be placed on the injured list (7-day or 60-day). Major League Baseball players may be placed on rosters for injury rehabilitation for a maximum of 20 days for non-pitchers and 30 days for pitchers. Players may be placed on the development list for any non-disciplinary reason as long as they are not injured. The temporary inactive list is for players attending to personal matters. Active players may be placed on the reserve list to make them temporarily ineligible to play for the purposes of meeting active roster limits. Players failing to report to their major league club within 10 days of the season's start, including those with visa problems, may be placed on the restricted list. Players may be suspended due to insubordination or misconduct or for failing to reach playing condition within 60 days after the start of spring training. Those placed on the suspended list by their team do not count against active player limits, while those suspended by the league do count toward the limit.

Minor league players may be placed on their major league club's taxi squad to serve as back-up players on road trips while remaining on a minor league roster and not counting toward the active limit. They are not permitted to be in uniform or in the dugout during games, unless added to the lineup, but they may practice with the team.

Each team usually has at least a three-man coaching staff including a manager, hitting coach, and pitching coach. Depending on each major league organization's development approach, some teams may have additional coaches in addition to non-uniformed athletic trainers and strength and conditioning coaches.

== East Division ==
=== Buffalo Bisons ===
Buffalo Bisons roster
| Players | | Coaches/Other |
|---|---|---|
| Pitchers: 37 Javen Coleman; -- Nic Enright; 35 Lázaro Estrada; 12 Pat Gallagher; 28 Richard Gallardo; 54 Sam Gardner; 58 Daniel Guerra; 37 Devereaux Harrison; 39 Yariel Rodríguez; 10 Grant Rogers; 50 Yondrei Rojas; 31 Gage Stanifer; 21 Josh Stephan; -- Trenton Wallace; 32 Josh Winckowski | Catchers Infielders: 45 Nick Goodwin; 7 Jay Harry; 4 Josh Kasevich; 24 Josh Rivera; 34 Peyton Williams; Outfielders: 5 RJ Schreck | Manager: 11 Casey Candaele; Coaches: 41 Trevor Cho (assistant hitting); 87 Drew Hayes (pitching); 77 Henry Leake (assistant pitching); 14 Cesar Martin (bench); 81 Chris Schaeffer (coach); 95 Matt Young (hitting); 7-day injured list; * On Toronto Blue Jays 40-man roster; ~ Development list; # Rehab assignment; ∞ Reserve list; ‡ Restricted list; § Suspended list; † Temporarily inactive list; Roster updated November 5, 2026; Transactions; → More rosters: MiLB • International League; → Toronto Blue Jays minor league players |

=== Charlotte Knights ===
Charlotte Knights roster
| Players | | Coaches/Other |
|---|---|---|
| Pitchers: 46 Nick Altermatt; 45 Pierce George; 19 Mathias LaCombe; 3 Jordan Morales; 44 Chris Murphy *; 47 Shane Murphy; 18 Peyton Pallette *; 49 Chase Plymell; 17 Joe Rock *; 28 Garrett Schoenle; 31 Jaden Woods | Catchers: 9 Kaleb Freeman; 12 Michael Turner; Infielders: 1 William Bergolla Jr.; 5 Mario Camilletti; 45 Tim Elko; 16 Ryan Galanie; 25 Jacob Gonzalez *; 9 Jason Matthews; Outfielders: 4 Dru Baker; 8 Caden Connor | Manager: 29 Chad Pinder; Coaches: 55 Scott Aldred (pitching); 84 Aaron Bray (hitting); 32 Pat Listach (bench); 21 Angel Rosario (catching); -- George Timke (performance); 7-day injured list; * On Chicago White Sox 40-man roster; ~ Development list; # Rehab assignment; ∞ Reserve list; ‡ Restricted list; § Suspended list; † Temporarily inactive list; Roster updated November 2, 2026; Transactions; → More rosters: MiLB • International League; → Chicago White Sox minor league players |

=== Durham Bulls ===
Durham Bulls roster
| Players | | Coaches/Other |
|---|---|---|
| Pitchers: 17 Hunter Bigge *; 60 Chris Clark; 65 Mason Englert *; 26 Michael Grove *; 54 Marcus Johnson; -- Ty Johnson *; 31 Trevor Martin *; 19 Evan Reifert; 12 Chase Solesky *; -- Brian Van Belle; -- Austin Vernon; 28 Kodi Whitley; 34 Owen Wild; 29 Logan Workman | Catchers: 12 Caden Bodine; 22 Logan Driscoll; 43 Tatem Levins; Infielders: 36 Chris Clark; 22 Xavier Isaac; 9 Tre' Morgan; Outfielders: 35 Homer Bush Jr.; 16 Jake Cave *; 7 Jacob Melton * | Manager: 14 Morgan Ensberg; Coaches: 66 Henry Bonilla (bullpen); 15 Reid Brignac (coach); 1 Keoni DeRenne (hitting); 38 Brian Reith (pitching); 32 German Melendez (bench); 7-day injured list; * On Tampa Bay Rays 40-man roster; ~ Development list; # Rehab assignment; ∞ Reserve list; ‡ Restricted list; § Suspended list; † Temporarily inactive list; Roster updated November 2, 2026; Transactions; → More rosters: MiLB • International League; → Tampa Bay Rays minor league players |

=== Jacksonville Jumbo Shrimp ===
Jacksonville Jumbo Shrimp roster
| Players | | Coaches/Other |
|---|---|---|
| Pitchers: 45 Jace Beck; 39 Holt Jones; 25 Karson Milbrandt; 36 Matt Pushard; 38 Jesús Tinoco; 27 Jake Walkinshaw; 34 Brandon White; 39 Thomas White | Catchers Infielders: 19 Garret Forrester; 20 Jonathon Long; 6 Juan Matheus; 2 Gage Miller; 5 Johnny Olmstead; Outfielders: 12 Kemp Alderman; 1 Cam Cannarella; 10 Brandon Compton; 3 Matthew Etzel; 29 Rece Hinds *; 17 Brendan Jones; 4 Andrew Pintar; 8 Brayden Taylor | Manager: 38 David Carpenter; Coaches: 30 Jose Ceballos (assistant); -- Tom DeAngelis (hitting); 43 Jerad Eickhoff (pitching); 13 Luke Terwilliger (assistant); 7-day injured list; * On Miami Marlins 40-man roster; ~ Development list; # Rehab assignment; ∞ Reserve list; ‡ Restricted list; § Suspended list; † Temporarily inactive list; Roster updated November 2, 2026; Transactions; → More rosters: MiLB • International League; → Miami Marlins minor league players |

=== Lehigh Valley IronPigs ===
Lehigh Valley IronPigs roster
| Players | | Coaches/Other |
|---|---|---|
| Pitchers: 41 Ryan Cusick; 47 Tristan Garnett; -- Connor Gillispie; 25 Chuck King; 48 Mitch Neunborn; -- Andrew Walling | Catchers: 38 Jordan Dissin; 24 Paul McIntosh; Infielders: 10 Keaton Anthony; 4 Robert Moore; Outfielders: 69 Wuilfredo Antunez; 3 Nick Biddison; 21 Jonathan Hogart | Manager: 30 Chris Adamson; Coaches: 62 Phil Cundari (pitching); 17 Adam Lind (hitting); 35 Ray Ricker (coach); 7-day injured list; * On Philadelphia Phillies 40-man roster; ~ Development list; # Rehab assignment; ∞ Reserve list; ‡ Restricted list; § Suspended list; † Temporarily inactive list; Roster updated November 3, 2026; Transactions; → More rosters: MiLB • International League; → Philadelphia Phillies minor league players |

=== Norfolk Tides ===
Norfolk Tides roster
| Players | | Coaches/Other |
|---|---|---|
| Pitchers: 29 Trace Bright; -- Connor Cooke; 43 Jake Dykhoff; 36 Michael Forret; 59 Nestor German; 66 Christian Herberholz; 25 Ryan Long; -- Robinson Martínez; 47 Gerald Ogando; -- Elvis Peguero; 26 Alex Pham; -- Jackson Rees; 56 Yaqui Rivera; 51 Jayvien Sandridge; 10 Juaron Watts-Brown; 34 Levi Wells | Catchers: 28 Ethan Anderson; 4 Silas Ardoin; 12 Creed Willems; Infielders: 31 Brandon Butterworth; 5 Payton Eeles; 53 Aron Estrada; Outfielders: 1 Enrique Bradfield; 3 Jud Fabian; 13 Tavian Josenberger; 17 Fernando Peguero | Manager: 19 Tim Federowicz; Coaches: 22 Felipe Alou Jr. (fundamentals); 46 Billy Facteau (development); 10 Rick Strickland (hitting); 52 Jeff Ware (pitching); 7-day injured list; * On Baltimore Orioles 40-man roster; ~ Development list; # Rehab assignment; ∞ Reserve list; ‡ Restricted list; § Suspended list; † Temporarily inactive list; Roster updated November 2, 2026; Transactions; → More rosters: MiLB • International League; → Baltimore Orioles minor league players |

=== Rochester Red Wings ===
Rochester Red Wings roster
| Players | | Coaches/Other |
|---|---|---|
| Pitchers: 26 Jack Cebert; 38 Joe Glassey; 21 Ben Grable; 22 Cole Henry *; 40 Isaac Lyon; 46 Wyatt Mills *; 44 Jarlin Susana | Catchers: 4 Maxwell Romero Jr.; Infielders: 1 Phillip Glasser; 5 Seaver King; 22 Cortland Lawson; 7 Trey Lipscomb; 14 Cayden Wallace; Outfielders: 25 Sam Petersen; 3 Johnathon Thomas | Manager: 45 Matthew LeCroy; Coaches: 51 Brian Daubach (hitting); 31 Anthony Deleo (quality control); 27 Travis Fitta (assistant hitting); 18 Mario Lisson (defensive); 43 Sam Narron (assistant pitching); 38 Fernando Nieve (pitching); 7-day injured list; * On Washington Nationals 40-man roster; ~ Development list; # Rehab assignment; ∞ Reserve list; ‡ Restricted list; § Suspended list; † Temporarily inactive list; Roster updated November 2, 2026; Transactions; → More rosters: MiLB • International League; → Washington Nationals minor league players |

=== Scranton/Wilkes-Barre Highlanders ===
Scranton/Wilkes-Barre Highlanders roster
| Players | | Coaches/Other |
|---|---|---|
| Pitchers: 39 Will Brian; 38 Carson Coleman; -- Luis García; 16 Brian Hendry; 41 Chris Kean; 40 Carlos Lagrange; 19 Hayden Merda; 29 Zach Messinger; 28 Eric Reyzelman; 33 Xavier Rivas; 31 Danny Watson | Catchers: 21 Edinson Duran; 12 Christian Rodriguez *; Infielders: 36 Tyler Hardman; 6 Connor McGinnis; Outfielders: 41 Garrett Martin; 30 Max Schuemann * | Manager: 17 Shelley Duncan; Coaches: 47 Raul Dominguez (defense); 88 Pete Larson (bullpen); 28 Michael Mergenthaler (hitting); 56 Spencer Medick (pitching); 45 Gil Velazquez (bench); 7-day injured list; * On New York Yankees 40-man roster; ~ Development list; # Rehab assignment; ∞ Reserve list; ‡ Restricted list; § Suspended list; † Temporarily inactive list; Roster updated November 2, 2026; Transactions; → More rosters: MiLB • International League; → New York Yankees minor league players |

=== Syracuse Mets ===
Syracuse Mets roster
| Players | | Coaches/Other |
|---|---|---|
| Pitchers: 40 Zach Franklin; 62 Saul Garcia; 99 Gary Gill Hill; 64 Ofreidy Gomez; 65 Dan Hammer; 27 Ryan Lambert; 45 Tyler McLoughlin; 30 Jonathan Santucci; 46 Ben Simon; 49 Garrett Stratton; 51 Matt Turner; 57 Jack Wenninger | Catchers: 29 Kevin Parada; Infielders: 11 Billy Amick; 20 Ryan Clifford; 26 Nick Lorusso; 50 Émilien Pitre; 4 Jefferson Rojas; Outfielders: 70 D'Andre Smith | Manager: 23 Dick Scott; Coaches: 44 Nate Irving (hitting); 58 Troy Miller (assistant pitching); 35 John Nogowski (bench); 44 A. J. Sager (pitching); 7-day injured list; * On New York Mets 40-man roster; ~ Development list; # Rehab assignment; ∞ Reserve list; ‡ Restricted list; § Suspended list; † Temporarily inactive list; Roster updated November 2, 2026; Transactions; → More rosters: MiLB • International League; → New York Mets minor league players |

=== Worcester Red Sox ===
Worcester Red Sox roster
| Players | | Coaches/Other |
|---|---|---|
| Pitchers: 41 Angel Bastardo; -- Max Carlson; 64 Isaac Coffey; 55 Patrick Halligan; 64 John Holobetz; 40 Joe La Sorsa *; 53 Michael Sansone; 35 Noah Song; 47 Blake Wehunt; 63 Gage Ziehl | Catchers: -- Riley Adams; 52 Nate Baez; 33 Nathan Hickey; Infielders: 16 Franklin Arias; 18 Max Ferguson; 60 Brett Harris *; -- Ahbram Liendo; 21 Tyler McDonough; -- Brendan Rodgers; 7 Mikey Romero; Outfielders: 3 Braiden Ward | Manager: 2 Iggy Suarez; Coaches: 61 Brendon Connolly (development); 22 Dan DeLucia (pitching); 10 Rich Gedman (hitting); 30 Noah Junis (bullpen); 16 Johnny Reina (assistant hitting); 7-day injured list; * On Boston Red Sox 40-man roster; ~ Development list; # Rehab assignment; ∞ Reserve list; ‡ Restricted list; § Suspended list; † Temporarily inactive list; Roster updated November 2, 2026; Transactions; → More rosters: MiLB • International League; → Boston Red Sox minor league players |

== West Division ==
=== Columbus Clippers ===
Columbus Clippers roster
| Players | | Coaches/Other |
|---|---|---|
| Pitchers: 45 Justin Campbell; -- Aaron Davenport; 17 Trenton Denholm; 34 Jack Jasiak; 40 Ben Lively; 49 Rorik Maltrud; 12 Izaak Martinez; 31 Hunter Stanley; 38 Trevor Stephan; 44 Ryan Webb | Catchers: 6 Kody Huff; Infielders: 4 Alex Mooney; 10 Tyresse Turner; 35 Ralphy Velazquez; Outfielders: 27 Alfonsin Rosario | Manager: 28 Andy Tracy; Coaches: 9 Matt Angle (hitting); -- Andrew Moore (pitching); 23 Daniel Robertson (bench); 15 Mac Seibert (development); 4 Ordomar Valdez (hitting); -- Nick Wittgren (pitching); 7-day injured list; * On Cleveland Guardians 40-man roster; ~ Development list; # Rehab assignment; ∞ Reserve list; ‡ Restricted list; § Suspended list; † Temporarily inactive list; Roster updated November 2, 2026; Transactions; → More rosters: MiLB • International League; → Cleveland Guardians minor league players |

=== Gwinnett Stripers ===
Gwinnett Stripers roster
| Players | | Coaches/Other |
|---|---|---|
| Pitchers: 52 Garrett Baumann; 48 Cedric De Grandpre; 71 Drue Hackenberg; -- Elieser Hernandez; 64 Herick Hernandez; 99 Davis Polo; 64 Brett Sears; 66 Luis Vargas | Catchers: 2 Maverick Handley; 32 Adam Zebrowski; Infielders: -- Vidal Brujan; 14 Cal Conley; 8 Lizandro Espinoza; 11 Jordan Groshans; 24 David McCabe; Outfielders: 61 Patrick Clohisy; 13 Kevin Kilpatrick Jr. | Manager: 50 Kanekoa Texeira; Coaches: 52 Craig Bjornson (bullpen); 38 Lance Carter (pitching); 53 Tyler Dalton (pitching); 9 Dan DeMent (hitting); 17 Angel Flores (coach); 30 Ruben Gotay (coach); 7-day injured list; * On Atlanta Braves 40-man roster; ~ Development list; # Rehab assignment; ∞ Reserve list; ‡ Restricted list; § Suspended list; † Temporarily inactive list; Roster updated November 2, 2026; Transactions; → More rosters: MiLB • International League; → Atlanta Braves minor league players |

=== Indianapolis Indians ===
Indianapolis Indians roster
| Players | | Coaches/Other |
|---|---|---|
| Pitchers: 43 Michael Darrell-Hicks; 50 Derek Diamond; 26 Nick Dombkowski; 46 Justin Meis; 39 Brandon Neeck; 19 Cy Nielson; 41 Landon Tomkins; 22 Cristhian Tortosa; 6 Michael Walsh; 33 Connor Wietgrefe | Catchers: 31 Derek Berg; Infielders: 2 Jesus Castillo; 20 Nick Cimillo; 27 Duce Gourson; -- Termarr Johnson; Outfielders: -- Kyler Fedko; 16 Mike Jarvis; 11 Mitch Jebb | Manager: 18 Eric Patterson; Coaches: 15 Drew Benes (pitching); 51 Nasusel Cabrera (pitching); 37 JD Closser (catching); 28 Casey Harms (hitting); 38 Eric Munson (hitting); 48 Joe Thatcher (coach); 7-day injured list; * On Pittsburgh Pirates 40-man roster; ~ Development list; # Rehab assignment; ∞ Reserve list; ‡ Restricted list; § Suspended list; † Temporarily inactive list; Roster updated November 2, 2026; Transactions; → More rosters: MiLB • International League; → Pittsburgh Pirates minor league players |

=== Iowa Cubs ===
Iowa Cubs roster
| Players | | Coaches/Other |
|---|---|---|
| Pitchers: -- Brandon Birdsell; 27 Antoine Kelly *; 29 Grant Kipp; 36 Gabe Klobosits; -- Zac Leigh; 37 Jack Neely; 40 Doug Nikhazy; 38 Connor Noland; -- Will Sanders; 2 Tyler Santana; 51 Evan Taylor; 22 Jaxon Wiggins | Catchers: 4 Owen Ayers; 1 Daniel Campos; Infielders: 4 Ben Cowles; Outfielders | Manager: 29 Marty Pevey; Coaches: 52 Tony Cougoule (pitching); 17 Taylor Fortney (hitting); 18 Nick Lovullo (bench); 44 Damon Minor (hitting); 50 Jamie Vermilyea (pitching); 7-day injured list; * On Chicago Cubs 40-man roster; ~ Development list; # Rehab assignment; ∞ Reserve list; ‡ Restricted list; § Suspended list; † Temporarily inactive list; Roster updated November 2, 2026; Transactions; → More rosters: MiLB • International League; → Chicago Cubs minor league players |

=== Louisville Bats ===
Louisville Bats roster
| Players | | Coaches/Other |
|---|---|---|
| Pitchers: 37 Kevin Abel; 21 Jose Acuna; 39 Julian Aguiar *; 18 Sam Benschoter; 40 Kent Emanuel *; 31 Brandon Leibrandt *; 32 Jared Lyons; 7 Kyle Nicolas *; 49 Hunter Parks | Catchers: 20 Dayne Leonard; 26 Michael Trautwein; Infielders: 17 Dominic Pitelli; Outfielders: 22 Jay Allen II; 30 Will Benson *; 23 Rece Hinds * | Manager: 33 Pat Kelly; Coaches: 46 Reid Cornelius (pitching); 25 Vince Harrison (coach); 28 Carson Phillips (pitching); 6 Peterson Plaz (coach); 55 Daryle Ward (hitting); 7-day injured list; * On Cincinnati Reds 40-man roster; ~ Development list; # Rehab assignment; ∞ Reserve list; ‡ Restricted list; § Suspended list; † Temporarily inactive list; Roster updated November 2, 2026; Transactions; → More rosters: MiLB • International League; → Cincinnati Reds minor league players |

=== Memphis Redbirds ===
Memphis Redbirds roster
| Players | | Coaches/Other |
|---|---|---|
| Pitchers: 50 Jurrangelo Cijntje; -- Alex Cornwell; 38 Josh Fleming; 35 Skylar Hales; 73 Pete Hansen; 21 Ixan Henderson; 51 Austin Love; 44 Mason Molina; 68 Bobby Olsen; 43 Sandro Santana; 30 Andrew Schultz; 8 Brandt Thompson | Catchers: 7 Graysen Tarlow; Infielders: 16 Dakota Harris; 75 Noah Mendlinger; 11 Ramon Mendoza; 19 Brody Moore; 27 Trey Paige; Outfielders: 5 Chase Davis; 12 Colton Ledbetter; 15 Zach Levenson | Manager: 34 Ben Johnson; Coaches: 56 Howie Clark (hitting); -- Ollie Kadey (pitching); 36 Darwin Marrero (pitching); 32 Peter Mooney (bench); 7-day injured list; * On St. Louis Cardinals 40-man roster; ~ Development list; # Rehab assignment; ∞ Reserve list; ‡ Restricted list; § Suspended list; † Temporarily inactive list; Roster updated November 2, 2026; Transactions; → More rosters: MiLB • International League; → St. Louis Cardinals minor league players |

=== Nashville Sounds ===
Nashville Sounds roster
| Players | | Coaches/Other |
|---|---|---|
| Pitchers: 15 Kaleb Bowman; -- Will Childers; 34 Tyson Hardin; 44 Blake Holub; 49 Edwin Jiminez; 47 Jared Koenig; 52 Tate Kuehner; 40 Carlos Rodríguez; 32 Cameron Wagoner; 38 Brett Wichrowski | Catchers Infielders: 57 Luke Adams; 45 Blake Burke; 5 Daniel Guilarte; 1 Ethan Murray; 10 Jonathan Ornelas; 25 Brock Wilken; 7 Jett Williams; Outfielders: 29 Eric Brown Jr. | Manager: 16 Rick Sweet; Coaches: 59 Eric Bunnell; -- Tim Doherty (hitting); -- Zachary Jones (hitting); -- Bryan Leslie (pitching); -- Tyler Thornburg (pitching); 24 David Tufo (bench); 7-day injured list; * On Milwaukee Brewers 40-man roster; ~ Development list; # Rehab assignment; ∞ Reserve list; ‡ Restricted list; § Suspended list; † Temporarily inactive list; Roster updated November 4, 2026; Transactions; → More rosters: MiLB • International League; → Milwaukee Brewers minor league players |

=== Omaha Storm Chasers ===
Omaha Storm Chasers roster
| Players | | Coaches/Other |
|---|---|---|
| Pitchers: 34 Spencer Bivens *; -- Mason Black; -- Ethan Bosacker; 28 Lucas Braun; -- Chazz Martinez; 47 John Means; 56 Hunter Owen; 36 Hunter Patteson; 53 Ryan Ramsey; 52 Ben Sears; 59 Henry Williams | Catchers: 18 Omar Hernández; 11 Luca Tresh; Infielders: 35 Colton Becker; 16 Jacob Berry; 30 Connor Kaiser; 3 Jack Pineda; 22 Brett Squires; 1 Peyton Wilson; Outfielders: 9 Gavin Cross; 6 Carson Roccaforte; 2 Javier Vaz | Manager: 13 Patrick Osborn; Coaches: -- Dane Johnson (pitching); 7 Tripp Keister (assistant); -- David Lundquist (assistant pitching); 14 Bijan Rademacher (hitting); 7-day injured list; * On Kansas City Royals 40-man roster; ~ Development list; # Rehab assignment; ∞ Reserve list; ‡ Restricted list; § Suspended list; † Temporarily inactive list; Roster updated November 2, 2026; Transactions; → More rosters: MiLB • International League; → Kansas City Royals minor league players |

=== St. Paul Saints ===
St. Paul Saints roster
| Players | | Coaches/Other |
|---|---|---|
| Pitchers: 47 Trent Baker; 21 Ricky Castro; 56 C. J. Culpepper; 33 Ryan Gallagher; 24 Ruddy Gomez; 58 Alejandro Hidalgo; 64 Paulshawn Pasqualotto | Catchers: 16 Noah Cardenas; 63 Ian Daugherty; Infielders: 25 Cody Morissette; 20 Jake Rucker; 1 Tanner Schobel; Outfielders | Manager: 12 Brian Dinkelman; Coaches: 55 C.J. Baker (hitting); 27 Carlos Hernandez (pitching); 64 Ryan Ricci (pitching); 35 Shawn Schlechter (hitting); 7-day injured list; * On Minnesota Twins 40-man roster; ~ Development list; # Rehab assignment; ∞ Reserve list; ‡ Restricted list; § Suspended list; † Temporarily inactive list; Roster updated November 2, 2026; Transactions; → More rosters: MiLB • International League; → Minnesota Twins minor league players |

=== Toledo Mud Hens ===
Toledo Mud Hens roster
| Players | | Coaches/Other |
|---|---|---|
| Pitchers: 44 Yoniel Curet; -- Yilber Diaz *; 43 Jack Flaherty *; 38 Andre Granillo; 58 Hayden Minton; -- RJ Petit; 32 Jackson Wolf | Catchers: 9 Josue Briceño; 20 Bennett Lee; 12 Carlos Perez *; 28 Seby Zavala; Infielders: 23 Max Anderson; Outfielders: 3 Justice Bigbie | Manager: 40 Gary Jones; Coaches: 34 Doug Bochtler (pitching); 10 Francisco Contreras (hitting); 27 Mike Hessman (hitting); 25 Jimmy Robbins (bullpen); 7-day injured list; * On Detroit Tigers 40-man roster; ~ Development list; # Rehab assignment; ∞ Reserve list; ‡ Restricted list; § Suspended list; † Temporarily inactive list; Roster updated November 6, 2026; Transactions; → More rosters: MiLB • International League; → Detroit Tigers minor league players |

== See also ==
- List of Pacific Coast League team rosters
