= Miami Marlins minor league players =

Below is a partial list of minor league baseball players in the Miami Marlins system:

== Players ==
=== Jace Beck ===
Jace Beck

Miami Marlins
- Pitcher
- Born: June 14, 2000 (age 26); Tuttle, Oklahoma, U.S.
- Bats: Right Throws: Right

Jace Dawson Beck (born June 14, 2000) is an American professional baseball pitcher in the Miami Marlins organization.

Beck attended Blanchard High School in Blanchard, Oklahoma. He was selected by the New York Mets in the 22nd round of the 2019 Major League Baseball draft. He played in the Mets organization until 2025.

Beck signed a minor league deal with the Chicago Cubs in December 2025. On August 3, 2026, the Cubs traded Beck and Jonathon Long to the Miami Marlins in exchange for Braxton Garrett. The Marlins added him to their 40-man roster after the season.

- Career statistics from Baseball Reference (Minors)

=== Starlyn Caba ===
Starlyn Caba

Miami Marlins
- Shortstop
- Born: December 6, 2005 (age 20); Bonao, Dominican Republic
- Bats: Switch Throws: Right

Jesus Starlyn Caba (born December 6, 2005) is a Dominican professional baseball shortstop in the Miami Marlins organization.

Caba signed with the Philadelphia Phillies as an international free agent in January 2023. He made his professional debut that season with the Dominican Summer League Phillies.

Caba started 2024 with the Rookie-level Florida Complex League Phillies.

On December 22, 2024, the Phillies traded Caba and Emaarion Boyd to the Miami Marlins in exchange for Jesús Luzardo and Paul McIntosh.

- Career statistics from Baseball Reference (Minors)

=== Brandon Compton ===
Brandon Compton

Miami Marlins
- Outfielder
- Born: October 27, 2003 (age 23); Glendale, Arizona, U.S.
- Bats: Left Throws: Left

Brandon Christopher Compton (born October 27, 2003) is an American professional baseball outfielder in the Miami Marlins organization.

Compton attended Buckeye Union High School in Buckeye, Arizona. As a senior he underwent Tommy John Surgery. Compton played college baseball at Arizona State University. As a freshman in 2024, he was the Pac-12 Freshman of the Year after hitting .354 with 14 home runs and 51 runs batted in (RBI).

Compton was selected by the Miami Marlins in the second round of the 2025 Major League Baseball draft. He made his professional debut that year with the Beloit Sky Carp. He started 2026 with Beloit before being promoted to the Pensacola Blue Wahoos.

- Career statistics from Baseball Reference (Minors)

=== Jaydenn Estanista ===
Jaydenn Estanista

Miami Marlins
- Pitcher
- Born: October 3, 2001 (age 25); Willemstad, Curaçao
- Bats: Right Throws: Right

Jaydenn Zachery Estanista (born October 3, 2001) is a Curaçaoan professional baseball pitcher in the Miami Marlins organization.

On November 8, 2019, Estanista signed with the Philadelphia Phillies as an international free agent. He did not play in a game in 2020 due to the cancellation of the minor league season because of the COVID-19 pandemic.

Estanista made seven appearances for the High–A Jersey Shore BlueClaws, struggling to an 18.47 ERA with four strikeouts across 6 1/3 innings pitched. He was released by the Phillies organization on May 17, 2026.

On June 2, 2026, Estanista signed a minor league contract with the Miami Marlins organization.

Estanista represented the Netherlands national baseball team in the 2023 World Baseball Classic and 2026 World Baseball Classic.

- Career statistics from Baseball Reference (Minors)

=== Matthew Etzel ===
Matthew Etzel

Miami Marlins
- Outfielder
- Born: April 30, 2002 (age 24); Webster, Texas, U.S.
- Bats: Right Throws: Right

Matthew Derrick Etzel (born April 30, 2002) is an American professional baseball outfielder in the Miami Marlins organization.

Etzel attended Clear Creek High School, in League City, Texas, and played college baseball at Panola College and the University of Southern Mississippi. In 2023, his lone season at Southern Mississippi, he appeared in 66 games and hit .317 with seven home runs and 51 runs batted in (RBI). After the season, he played collegiate summer baseball with the Chatham Anglers of the Cape Cod Baseball League. Etzel was selected by the Baltimore Orioles in the tenth round of the 2023 MLB draft.

Etzel signed with the Orioles and split his first professional season with the Rookie-level Florida Complex League Orioles, the Single-A Delmarva Shorebirds, and the High-A Aberdeen IronBirds, batting .323 with two home runs over thirty games. He was assigned to Aberdeen to open the 2024 season and was promoted to the Double-A Bowie Baysox in early June.

On July 26, 2024, Etzel was traded (alongside Mac Horvath and Jackson Baumeister) to the Tampa Bay Rays in exchange for Zach Eflin. The Rays assigned him to the Double-A Montgomery Biscuits, with whom he finished the season. Over 119 games between Aberdeen, Bowie, and Montgomery, Etzel slashed .272/.345/.540 with 11 home runs, 66 RBI, and 45 stolen bases. He was assigned to Montgomery to open the 2025 season.

On July 29, 2025, Etzel was traded to the Miami Marlins in exchange for Nick Fortes. He played a rehab assignment with the Single-A Jupiter Hammerheads, was then assigned to the Double-A Pensacola Blue Wahoos, and then was promoted to the Triple-A Jacksonville Jumbo Shrimp. Over 92 games played for the season, Etzel hit .248 with seven home runs, 49 RBI and 27 stolen bases. In 2026, he played the entire season with Jacksonville and batted .241 with 19 home runs, 62 RBI, and 25 stolen bases over 120 games.

- Career statistics from MLB · Baseball Reference (Minors)
- Southern Miss Golden Eagles bio

=== Eliazar Dishmey ===
Eliazar Dishmey

Miami Marlins
- Pitcher
- Born: October 25, 2004 (age 22); Santo Domingo, Dominican Republic
- Bats: Switch Throws: Right

Eliazar Dishmey is a professional baseball pitcher in the Miami Marlins organization.

=== Payton Green ===
Payton Green

Miami Marlins
- Shortstop
- Born: January 17, 2003 (age 23); Cary, North Carolina, U.S.
- Bats: Right Throws: Right

Payton Emmett Green (born January 17, 2003) is an American professional baseball shortstop in the Miami Marlins organization.

Green attended Green Hope High School in Cary, North Carolina and Pro5 Baseball Academy in Holly Springs, North Carolina. He was selected by the Boston Red Sox in the 15th round of the 2021 Major League Baseball draft but did not sign and enrolled at NC State University where he played two seasons of college baseball for the Wolfpack. As a freshman for NC State in 2022, he started 57 games and batted .256 with seven home runs. In 2022, he played collegiate summer baseball with the Harwich Mariners of the Cape Cod Baseball League. In 2023, his sophomore season, he played 55 games and hit .274 with ten home runs and 45 RBI. After his sophomore season, he entered the transfer portal and committed to the Georgia Tech to play for the Yellow Jackets. In his lone season at Georgia Tech, he played in 55 games and hit .308 with 12 home runs and 42 RBI.

After his junior year at Georgia Tech, Green was selected by the Miami Marlins in the sixth round of the 2024 Major League Baseball draft and signed with the team. Green made his professional debut after signing with the Single-A Jupiter Hammerheads, with whom he hit .184 across 18 games. In 2025, he played with the High-A Beloit Snappers and the Double-A Pensacola Blue Wahoos and batted .266 with eight home runs and 41 RBI over 92 games. Green returned to Pensacola to open the 2026 season and was promoted to the Triple-A Jacksonville Jumbo Shrimp in May. Across 78 games between both teams, he hit .226 with ten home runs, 27 RBI, and 21 stolen bases.

- Career statistics from Baseball Reference (Minors)
- Georgia Tech Yellow Jackets bio

=== Cristian Hernández ===
Cristian Hernández

Miami Marlins
- Shortstop
- Born: December 13, 2003 (age 22); Santo Domingo, Dominican Republic
- Bats: Right Throws: Right

Cristian De Jesus Hernández (born December 13, 2003) is a Dominican professional baseball shortstop in the Miami Marlins organization.

Hernández was considered one of the top international free agents in the 2021 class. He signed with the Chicago Cubs in January 2021, and made his professional debut that year with the Dominican Summer League Cubs.

Hernández played 2022 with the Arizona Complex League Cubs and 2023 with the Myrtle Beach Pelicans. He started 2024 with Myrtle Beach before being promoted to the South Bend Cubs and started 2025 with South Bend.

On January 7, 2026, Hernández, Owen Caissie, and Edgardo De Leon were traded to the Miami Marlins in exchange for Edward Cabrera.

- Career statistics from Baseball Reference (Minors)

=== Dylan Jasso ===
Dylan Jasso

Miami Marlins
- Third baseman
- Born: November 30, 2002 (age 23); Parral, Chihuahua, Mexico
- Bats: Right Throws: Right

Javier Jasso (born November 30, 2002) is a Mexican professional baseball third baseman in the Miami Marlins organization.

Born in Parral, Chihuahua, Mexico, Jasso played one season of college baseball at New Mexico Junior College and hit .453 with 25 home runs during the 2023 season. He signed with the New York Yankees as an undrafted free agent in 2023.

Jasso made his professional debut that season with the Florida Complex League Yankees and Tampa Tarpons, batting .320 over 21 games between both teams. Jasso opened the 2024 season with the Tampa and was promoted to the Hudson Valley Renegades near the season's end. Over 120 games between both teams, he hit .243 with 11 home runs and 67 RBIs. Jasso was assigned to the Somerset Patriots for the 2025 season. Over 127 games, he batted .257 with 13 home runs and 76 RBIs.

On January 13, 2026, the Yankees traded Jasso, Dillon Lewis, Brendan Jones, and Juan Matheus to the Miami Marlins in exchange for Ryan Weathers. He played the 2026 season with the Pensacola Blue Wahoos and batted .264 with four home runs and 30 RBI over 69 games.

- Career statistics from Baseball Reference (Minors)

=== Jacob Kisting ===
Jacob Kisting

Miami Marlins
- Pitcher
- Born: April 9, 2003 (age 23); Madison, Wisconsin, U.S.
- Bats: Right Throws: Right

Jacob Fredrick Kisting (born April 9, 2003) is an American professional baseball pitcher in the Miami Marlins organization.

Kisting attended Verona Area High School in Verona, Wisconsin, and had a 4–2 record and a 0.69 earned run average (ERA) as a senior for the baseball team in 2021. He played three years of college baseball at Bradley University. As a freshman for Bradley in 2022, he led the team in games started with 15, wins with six, and innings pitched with 83, ending with a 4.88 ERA. He pitched only 16 innings as a junior in 2024 due to injury.

Kisting was selected by the Minnesota Twins in the 14th round of the 2024 Major League Baseball draft. He made his professional debut in 2025 with the Single-A Fort Myers Miracle and was promoted to the High-A Cedar Rapids Kernels during the season. Across 30 appearances (five starts), Kisting had a 5–5 record, a 3.79 ERA, and 77 strikeouts across 73 2/3 innings.

On November 18, 2025, Kisting was traded to the Tampa Bay Rays in exchange for Eric Orze. To begin the 2026 season, he was assigned to the High-A Bowling Green Hot Rods, for whom he pitched in 18 games (with 16 starts) and went 6–0 with a 1.67 ERA and 96 strikeouts across 86 innings.

On August 3, 2026, Kisting, Brayden Taylor, and Adrian Santana were traded to the Miami Marlins in exchange for Liam Hicks. The Marlins assigned him to the Double-A Pensacola Blue Wahoos. With Pensacola, Kisting made four starts and had a 4–0 record, a 1.88 ERA, and 31 strikeouts over 24 innings. His season ERA of 1.72 between Bowling Green and Pensacola led the minor leagues, and his walks plus hits per inning pitched (WHIP) of 0.91 was second.

- Career statistics from Baseball Reference (Minors)
- Bradley Braves bio

=== Dillon Lewis ===
Dillon Lewis

Miami Marlins
- Outfielder
- Born: June 12, 2003 (age 23); Columbia, Maryland, U.S.
- Bats: Right Throws: Right

Dillon Thomas Lewis (born June 12, 2003) is an American professional baseball outfielder in the Miami Marlins organization.

Lewis attended Ardrey Kell High School in Charlotte, North Carolina and played college baseball at Queens University of Charlotte. He was selected by the New York Yankees in the 13th round of the 2024 Major League Baseball draft.

Lewis made his professional debut with the Tampa Tarpons and started 2025 with Tampa before being promoted to the Hudson Valley Renegades.

On January 13, 2026, the Yankees traded Lewis, Brendan Jones, Dylan Jasso and Juan Matheus to the Miami Marlins in exchange for Ryan Weathers.

- Career statistics from Baseball Reference (Minors)

=== Jonathon Long ===
Jonathon Long

Miami Marlins
- First baseman
- Born: January 20, 2002 (age 24); Orange, California, U.S.
- Bats: Right Throws: Right

Jonathon Brian Long (born January 20, 2002) is an American professional baseball first baseman in the Miami Marlins organization.

Long attended Orange High School in Orange, California, and played college baseball at Long Beach State University. He joined the team as a walk-on as a freshman in 2021. In 2022, he played collegiate summer baseball with the Yarmouth–Dennis Red Sox of the Cape Cod Baseball League. As a junior at Long Beach State in 2023, Long appeared in 55 games and hit .312 with 15 home runs and 52 RBIs. He was selected by the Chicago Cubs in the ninth round of the 2023 Major League Baseball draft and signed.

Long split his first professional season between the Rookie-level Arizona League Cubs and the Single-A Myrtle Beach Pelicans, batting .274 with seven home runs and 14 RBIs over 26 games between both teams. He was assigned to the High-A South Bend Cubs to open the 2024 season and was promoted to the Double-A Tennessee Smokies in mid-July. Over 114 games between the two teams, Long compiled a slash line of .283/.391/.461 with 17 home runs and 70 RBIs. After the season, he was selected to play in the Arizona Fall League with the Mesa Solar Sox and hit .338 with six home runs over 18 games. Long was assigned to the Triple-A Iowa Cubs for the 2025 season. Over 140 games, he hit .305 with 20 home runs and 91 RBIs. The Cubs named Long their Buck O'Neil Minor League Player of the Year. He returned to Iowa to open the 2026 season. Across 99 games with Iowa, Long batted .283 with 12 home runs and 62 RBIs.

On August 3, 2026, Long and Jace Beck were traded to the Miami Marlins in exchange for Braxton Garrett. The Marlins assigned him to the Triple-A Jacksonville Jumbo Shrimp. Over 34 games with Jacksonville, Long hit .250 with four home runs and 21 RBIs.

Long was selected to play for the Chinese Taipei national baseball team in the 2026 World Baseball Classic. He later withdrew from the team due to a left elbow strain.

- Career statistics from MLB · ESPN · Fangraphs · Baseball Reference (Minors)
- Long Beach State Dirtbags bio

=== Christian MacLeod ===
Christian MacLeod

Miami Marlins
- Pitcher
- Born: April 12, 2000 (age 26); Huntsville, Alabama, U.S.
- Bats: Left Throws: Left

Christian Ferguson MacLeod (born April 12, 2000) is an American professional baseball pitcher in the Miami Marlins organization.

MacLeod attended Huntsville High School in Huntsville, Alabama, and played college baseball at Mississippi State University for the Bulldogs. In 2021, he started 19 games for the Bulldogs and went 6–6 with a 5.23 ERA and 113 strikeouts. After the season, he was selected by the Minnesota Twins in the fifth round of the 2021 Major League Baseball draft.

MacLeod signed with the Twins and made his professional debut after signing with the Florida Complex League Twins, appearing in one game. He did not appear in a game in 2022 after undergoing Tommy John surgery. He opened the 2023 season with the Fort Myers Miracle and was quickly promoted to the Cedar Rapids Kernels, going 5–2 with a 4.08 ERA and 69 strikeouts over 70 2/3 innings between both teams. MacLeod split the 2024 season between Cedar Rapids, the Wichita Wind Surge, and the St. Paul Saints, starting twenty games between the three teams and going 4–4 with a 3.41 ERA and 107 strikeouts over 92 1/3 innings.

MacLeod opened the 2025 season on a rehab assignment with Fort Myers before being assigned to Wichita and then being promoted to St. Paul. Over 27 appearances (17 starts) for the season, he went 4–5 with a 4.34 ERA and 94 strikeouts over 87 innings. MacLeod was assigned to St. Paul to open the 2026 season and made one appearance in which he gave up six earned runs over 0 2/3 of an inning. He was released by the Twins on April 4.

On May 11, 2026, MacLeod signed a minor league contract with the Miami Marlins. He was subsequently assigned to the Pensacola Blue Wahoos and also played with the Jacksonville Jumbo Shrimp. MacLeod appeared in 29 games for the 2026 season between St. Paul, Pensacola, and Jacksonville and had a 2–1 record, a 5.44 ERA, 40 strikeouts, and 43 walks across 44 2/3 innings.

- Career statistics from Baseball Reference (Minors)
- Mississippi State Bulldogs bio

=== Juan Matheus ===
Juan Matheus

Miami Marlins
- Infielder
- Born: April 29, 2004 (age 22); Lara, Venezuela
- Bats: Switch Throws: Right

Juan David Matheus (born April 29, 2004) is a Venezuelan professional baseball infielder in the Miami Marlins organization.

Matheus signed with the New York Yankees as an international free agent in January 2022. He made his professional debut that year with the Dominican Summer League Yankees. Matheus played 2023 with the DSL Yankees and 2024 with the Florida Complex League Yankees and Tampa Tarpons. He started 2025 with Tampa before being promoted to the Hudson Valley Renegades.

On January 13, 2026, the Yankees traded Matheus, Dillon Lewis, Brendan Jones and Dylan Jasso to the Miami Marlins for Ryan Weathers. He started his Marlins career that year with the Beloit Sky Carp before being promoted to the Pensacola Blue Wahoos.

- Career statistics from Baseball Reference (Minors)

=== Karson Milbrandt ===
Karson Milbrandt

Miami Marlins
- Pitcher
- Born: April 21, 2004 (age 22); Liberty, Missouri, U.S.
- Bats: Right Throws: Right

Karson McCullough Milbrandt (born April 21, 2004) is an American professional baseball pitcher in the Miami Marlins organization.

Milbrandt attended Liberty High School in Liberty, Missouri. As a senior in 2022, he was the Gatorade Baseball Player of the Year for Missouri. He was drafted by the Miami Marlins in the third round of the 2022 MLB draft.

Milbrandt made his professional debut with the Jupiter Hammerheads. He pitched 2023 with Jupiter and the Beloit Sky Carp.

- Career statistics from Baseball Reference (Minors)

=== Gage Miller ===
Gage Miller

Miami Marlins
- Second baseman
- Born: March 1, 2003 (age 23); Harrisburg, Pennsylvania, U.S.
- Bats: Right Throws: Right

Gage Jackson Miller (born March 1, 2003) is an American professional baseball second baseman in the Miami Marlins organization.

Miller attended Palmyra Area High School in Palmyra, Pennsylvania. As a senior in 2021, he had a batting average of .458 and hit five home runs. After graduating, Miller played two seasons of college baseball at Bishop State Community College, batting .391 with eight home runs in 2022 and .397 with 50 runs batted in (RBI) in 2023. In 2022 and 2023, he played collegiate summer baseball for the Amsterdam Mohawks of the Perfect Game Collegiate Baseball League. Miller transferred to the University of Alabama for the 2024 season and batted .381 with 18 home runs and 56 RBI across 55 games.

Miller was selected by the Miami Marlins in the third round of the 2024 Major League Baseball draft. He made his professional debut after signing with the Jupiter Hammerheads and was later promoted to the Beloit Snappers, hitting .240 with 12 RBI across a total of 26 games played. In 2025, Miller returned to Beloit to start the season and was promoted to the Pensacola Blue Wahoos in August. Over 102 games played, he batted .211 with six home runs, 31 RBI and 21 stolen bases. Miller returned to Pensacola to begin the 2026 season and was promoted to the Jacksonville Jumbo Shrimp in May. Across 83 games between the two teams, he hit .254 with 11 home runs and 46 RBI.

- Career statistics from Baseball Reference (Minors)
- Alabama Crimson Tide bio

=== Emmett Olson ===
Emmett Olson

Miami Marlins
- Pitcher
- Born: May 15, 2002 (age 24); Des Plaines, Illinois, U.S.
- Bats: Left Throws: Left

Emmett James Olson (born May 15, 2002) is an American professional baseball pitcher in the Miami Marlins organization.

Olson attended Maine West High School in Des Plaines, Illinois, where he played baseball. As a junior in 2019, he went 4–1 with a 1.04 ERA and 79 strikeouts. He went unselected in the 2020 Major League Baseball draft and enrolled at the University of Nebraska to play college baseball. He played for Independence League Baseball with the Fremont Moo over the summer.

Olson pitched sparingly as a freshman for Nebraska in 2021. In 2022, as a sophomore, he appeared in 19 games and went 3–3 with a 2.86 ERA. As a junior in 2023, Olson started 15 games and went 6–3 with a 4.50 ERA and eighty strikeouts over 82 innings.

The Miami Marlins selected him in the fourth round of the 2023 Major League Baseball draft. Olson signed with the Marlins and made his professional debut with the Florida Complex League Marlins, appearing in one game in 2023. He opened the 2024 season with the Jupiter Hammerheads and was promoted to the Beloit Sky Carp in late April. Over 21 starts between the two teams, Olson went 7–6 with a 3.16 ERA and 95 strikeouts over 102 2/3 innings. He returned to Beloit to open the 2025 season. In early June he was placed on the injured list, and subsequently underwent Tommy John surgery, ending his season. Olson appeared in nine games for the season and pitched to a 4.15 ERA and 32 strikeouts across 34 2/3 innings. In 2026, he pitched 18 innings between Jupiter, Beloit, and the Pensacola Blue Wahoos, posting a 9.50 ERA. After the season, he was assigned to play in the Arizona Fall League with the Glendale Desert Dogs.

- Career statistics from Baseball Reference (Minors)
- Nebraska Cornhuskers bio

=== Nate Payne ===
Nate Payne

Miami Marlins
- Pitcher
- Born: August 19, 2005 (age 21); Harrisburg, Pennsylvania, U.S.
- Bats: Left Throws: Left

Nate Richard Payne (born August 19, 2005) is an American professional baseball pitcher in the Miami Marlins organization.

Payne attended Central Dauphin High School in Harrisburg, Pennsylvania. He was selected by the Miami Marlins in the 18th round of the 2024 Major League Baseball draft.

Payne spent his first professional season in 2025 with the Florida Complex League Marlins and Jupiter Hammerheads. He started 2026 with Jupiter and was promoted to the Beloit Sky Carp.

- Career statistics from Baseball Reference (Minors)

=== Andrew Pintar ===
Andrew Pintar

Miami Marlins
- Center fielder
- Born: March 23, 2001 (age 25); Provo, Utah, U.S.
- Bats: Right Throws: Right

Andrew Nicholas Pintar (born March 23, 2001) is an American professional baseball center fielder in the Miami Marlins organization.

Pintar played for the 2013 United States national under-12 baseball team. He attended Spanish Fork High School in Spanish Fork, Utah, and played college baseball at Brigham Young University (BYU). Pintar hit .286 as a freshman and .333 with nine home runs over 48 games as a sophomore. He played only 17 games as a junior in 2022 due to a shoulder injury. Despite this, Pintar was still selected by the Arizona Diamondbacks in the fifth round of the 2022 Major League Baseball draft, becoming the highest BYU pick in a decade.

Pintar signed with the Diamondbacks and split his first professional season in 2023 between the Arizona Complex League Diamondbacks, Visalia Rawhide, and Hillsboro Hops, hitting .243 with three home runs and twenty RBIs, missing time due to an injury. He was assigned to Hillsboro to open the 2024 season and was promoted to the Amarillo Sod Poodles in early June.

On July 25, 2024, Pintar (alongside Deyvison De Los Santos) was traded to the Miami Marlins in exchange for A.J. Puk. The Marlins assigned him to the Pensacola Blue Wahoos, with whom he finished the season. Over 102 games for the season, Pintar hit .255 with nine home runs, 46 RBIs, and 24 stolen bases. After the season, he was assigned to play for the Peoria Javelinas of the Arizona Fall League and was named the league's Defensive Player of the Year after not committing an error in 51 chances in center field. Pintar was assigned to the Jacksonville Jumbo Shrimp for the 2025 season. Over 84 games, he hit .269 with four home runs, 32 RBIs, and 23 stolen bases. Pintar returned to Jacksonville to begin the 2026 season and was named the Marlins Next Wave Hitter of the Month for May. Across 90 games with Jacksonville, he batted .266 with 10 home runs, 48 RBIs, and 27 stolen bases.

- Career statistics from Baseball Reference (Minors)
- BYU Cougars bio

=== Fenwick Trimble ===
Fenwick Trimble

Miami Marlins
- Outfielder
- Born: August 29, 2002 (age 24); Virginia Beach, Virginia, U.S.
- Bats: Right Throws: Right

Fenwick Alexander Trimble (born August 29, 2002) is an American professional baseball outfielder in the Miami Marlins organization.

Trimble attended Frank W. Cox High School in Virginia Beach, Virginia and played college baseball at James Madison University. In 2023, he played collegiate summer baseball with the Orleans Firebirds of the Cape Cod Baseball League. He was selected by the Miami Marlins in the fourth round of the 2024 Major League Baseball draft.

He made his professional debut in 2024 with the Jupiter Hammerheads and played 2025 with Florida Complex League Marlins, Beloit Sky Carp, and Pensacola Blue Wahoos. After the 2025 season, he played in the Arizona Fall League.

- Career statistics from Baseball Reference (Minors)

=== Brandon White ===
Brandon White

Miami Marlins
- Pitcher
- Born: November 26, 1999 (age 26); Olympia, Washington, U.S.
- Bats: Right Throws: Right

Brandon Xavier White (born November 26, 1999) is an American professional baseball pitcher in the Miami Marlins organization.

White attended W. F. West High School in Chehalis, Washington. He was selected by the Los Angeles Dodgers in the 14th round of the 2018 Major League Baseball draft but did not sign and instead enrolled at Washington State University where he played college baseball for the Cougars. As a junior for the Cougars in 2021, White made 13 starts and had a 6–4 record and 4.98 earned run average (ERA). After his junior year, he was selected by the Miami Marlins in the 12th round of the 2021 Major League Baseball draft.

White underwent Tommy John surgery after signing with the Marlins and made his professional debut in 2023, pitching to a 5.02 ERA across 28 2/3 innings between the Florida Complex League Marlins and Jupiter Hammerheads. In 2024, he played the entirety of the season with Jupiter and went 6–5 with a 4.98 ERA across 19 games (15 starts). White played in the Arizona Fall League with the Peoria Javelinas after the season. He was assigned to the High-A Beloit Snappers for the 2025 season and pitched to a 7–4 record, 4.06 ERA and 73 strikeouts across 93 innings. White opened 2026 with the Double-A Pensacola Blue Wahoos and was promoted to the Triple-A Jacksonville Jumbo Shrimp during the season. Over 24 games (22 starts) between the two teams, he had a 5–9 record, a 5.11 ERA, and 119 strikeouts over 105 2/3 innings. After the season, the Marlins added White to their 40-man roster to protect him from the Rule 5 draft.

- Career statistics from Baseball Reference (Minors)
- Washington State Cougars bio

=== Max Williams ===
Max Williams

Miami Marlins
- Outfielder
- Born: August 18, 2004 (age 22); Detroit, Michigan, U.S.
- Bats: Left Throws: Left

Max David Williams (born August 18, 2004) is an American professional baseball outfielder in the Miami Marlins organization.

Williams attended Clay High School in Green Cove Springs, Florida and played college baseball at the University of Alabama for one year and Florida State University for two. He was selected by the Miami Marlins in the third round of the 2025 Major League Baseball draft. He made his professional debut that year with the Jupiter Hammerheads.

Williams started 2026 with Jupiter before being promoted to the Beloit Sky Carp and then the Pensacola Blue Wahoos.

- Career statistics from Baseball Reference (Minors)

== Full Triple-A to Rookie League rosters ==
=== Triple-A ===
Jacksonville Jumbo Shrimp roster
Players		Coaches/Other
Pitchers: 45 Jace Beck; 39 Holt Jones; 25 Karson Milbrandt; -- Luis Palacios; 36 Matt Pushard; 38 Jesús Tinoco; 27 Jake Walkinshaw; 34 Brandon White; 39 Thomas White	Catchers Infielders: 19 Garret Forrester; 20 Jonathon Long; 6 Juan Matheus; 2 Gage Miller; 5 Johnny Olmstead; Outfielders: 12 Kemp Alderman; 1 Cam Cannarella; 10 Brandon Compton; 3 Matthew Etzel; 29 Rece Hinds *; 17 Brendan Jones; 4 Andrew Pintar; 8 Brayden Taylor	Manager: 38 David Carpenter; Coaches: 30 Jose Ceballos (assistant); -- Tom DeAngelis (hitting); 43 Jerad Eickhoff (pitching); 13 Luke Terwilliger (assistant); 7-day injured list; * On Miami Marlins 40-man roster; ~ Development list; # Rehab assignment; ∞ Reserve list; ‡ Restricted list; § Suspended list; † Temporarily inactive list; Roster updated November 13, 2026; Transactions; → More rosters: MiLB • International League; → Miami Marlins minor league players

=== Double-A ===
Pensacola Blue Wahoos roster
Players		Coaches/Other
Pitchers: 23 Nigel Belgrave; 21 Gabe Bierman; 19 Kade Bragg; 31 Eliazar Dishmey; 24 Josh Hejka; 39 Jacob Kisting; 34 Colby Martin; -- Xavier Meachem; 9 Jacob Miller; 38 Emmett Olson; 26 Orlando Ortiz-Mayr; 25 Juan Reynoso; 32 Will Schomberg; 18 Jack Sellinger; 36 Tristan Stevens; 34 Justin Storm; 16 Joey Volini; 36 Logan Whitaker; 33 Alex Williams	Catchers: 27 Spencer Bramwell; 7 Ryan Ignoffo; 40 Nestor Rios; Infielders: 5 Aiva Arquette; 28 Jay Beshears; 39 Payton Green; 4 Cristian Hernández; 14 Dylan Jasso; 6 Ian Lewis Jr.; 8 Adrian Santana; Outfielders: 24 Emaarion Boyd; 1 Dillon Lewis; 3 Ethan O'Donnell; 11 Colby Shade; 13 Fenwick Trimble; Designated hitters: 10 Max Williams	Manager: 22 Nelson Prada; Coaches: 17 Toby Nagel (pitching); 29 Brian Sharpe (hitting); 2 Mason Sherill (assistant); 15 Cam Vega (defensive); 7-day injured list; * On Miami Marlins 40-man roster; ~ Development list; # Rehab assignment; ∞ Reserve list; ‡ Restricted list; § Suspended list; † Temporarily inactive list; Roster updated November 2, 2026; Transactions; → More rosters: MiLB • Southern League; → Miami Marlins minor league players

=== High-A ===
Beloit Sky Carp roster
Players		Coaches/Other
Pitchers: 27 Nick Brink; 39 Xavier Cardenas III; 19 Hayden Cuthbertson; 39 Luis De La Cruz; 35 Jaydenn Estanista; 11 Peyton Fosher; 9 Luke Lashutka; 10 Carson Laws; -- Nick Maldonado; 28 Liomar Martinez; 23 Julio Mendez; 19 Brayan Mendoza; 29 Noble Meyer; 31 Nate Payne; 27 Engel Peralta; 37 Michael Perez; 26 Cannon Pickell; 36 Chase Renner; 35 Braulio Salas	Catchers: 24 Victor Ortega; 18 Wilson Weber; Infielders: 17 Emilio Barreras; 6 Starlyn Caba; 12 Cam Clayton; 22 Drew Faurot; 14 Jesus Hernandez; 5 Chase Jaworsky; 22 Carter Johnson; 7 Wilfredo Lara; 34 Abrahan Ramirez; 8 Cody Schrier; Outfielders: 3 Dillon Head; 33 Jacob Jenkins-Cowart; 20 Brian Sanchez; 5 Esmil Valencia	Manager: 1 Angel Espada; Coaches: -- Bobby Dorta (assistant); 41 Jason Erickson (pitching); 43 Josh Glenn (defensive); -- Michael Ryan (hitting); 7-day injured list; * On Miami Marlins 40-man roster; ~ Development list; # Rehab assignment; ∞ Reserve list; ‡ Restricted list; § Suspended list; † Temporarily inactive list; Roster updated November 2, 2026; Transactions; → More rosters: MiLB • Midwest League; → Miami Marlins minor league players

=== Single-A ===
Jupiter Hammerheads roster
Players		Coaches/Other
Pitchers: 32 Keyner Benitez; 22 Samuel Carpio; 43 Walin Castillo; 21 Jake Clemente; 52 Juan De La Cruz; 26 Kifraidy Encarnacion; 22 Hamlet Garcia; 30 Manuel Genao; 28 Luke Lashutka; 45 Ian Medina; 40 Gerinton Mendez; 19 Janero Miller; 55 Elier Morillo; 31 Eiver Mosquera ‡; -- Darwin Rodriguez; 38 Victor Rodriguez; 52 Jonathan Rosario; 39 Yohanfer Santana; -- RJ Shunck; -- Grant Shepardson; 35 Dameivi Tineo; 32 Jonas Uzcategui	Catchers: 15 Jeremy Almonte; -- Jessada Brown; 2 Nixon Chirinos; 18 Carlos Sanchez; 25 Almen Tolentino; Infielders: 23 Juan Alva; -- Chris Arroyo; 17 Angel Brachi; &bnsp;9 Eric Guevara; 27 Josh Hogue; 4 Cam Kozeal; 4 Luis Leon; 1 Jacob Lombard; 6 Jake McCutcheon; 14 Yoffry Solano; 24 Echedry Vargas; Outfielders: 12 Luis Cova; 8 P. J. Morlando; 3 Wessley Roberson; 10 Andres Valor	Manager: 11 Kyle Stahlberg; Coaches: -- Wilfri Castro (assistant); 5 Gabe Ortiz (assistant); -- Tommy Phelps (pitching); -- Easton Waterman (hitting); 7-day injured list; * On Miami Marlins 40-man roster; ~ Development list; # Rehab assignment; ∞ Reserve list; ‡ Restricted list; § Suspended list; † Temporarily inactive list; Roster updated November 2, 2026; Transactions; → More rosters: MiLB • Florida State League; → Miami Marlins minor league players

=== Rookie ===
Florida Complex League Marlins roster
Players		Coaches/Other
Pitchers: -- Bane Barker; -- Trey Beard; -- Connor Benge; -- Fabio Bundi; -- Porter Buursema; 11 Kevin Defrank; 37 Diego Godoy; -- Colby Guy; 48 Elvin Jimenez; -- Tyler Kapa; -- Ethan Kleinschmit; -- Colin Linder; -- Duke McCarron; -- Jackson Mitchell; 91 Pedro Montero; 45 Jose Paulino; -- Zach Peters; -- Ryan Peterson; 40 Albert Polanco; -- Natanael Polanco; -- Cole Selvig; -- Kaiden Wilson	Catchers: 8 Adrian Bello; -- Joey Lawson; Infielders: 23 Luis Arana; -- Edgardo De Leon; 27 Breyias Dean; 15 Yordani Martinez; 6 Andrew Salas; -- Rintaro Sasaki; -- Nic Tolbert; Outfielders: -- Jose Castro; 22 John Cruz; 29 Jancory De La Cruz; -- Hyun Seung Lee; -- Jatniel McCloud	Manager: -- Joel Avina; Coaches: 48 Ivan Arteaga (pitching); -- Mark Branz (pitching); -- Victor Di Diego (defensive); -- Jason Krizon (hitting); -- Masayuki Maruhash (defensive); -- Cameron Witt (hitting); 7-day injured list; * On Miami Marlins 40-man roster; ~ Development list; # Rehab assignment; ∞ Reserve list; ‡ Restricted list; § Suspended list; † Temporarily inactive list; Roster updated November 2, 2026; Transactions; → More rosters: MiLB • Florida Complex League; → Miami Marlins minor league players

=== Foreign Rookie ===
Dominican Summer League Miami roster
Players		Coaches/Other
Pitchers: 25 Luis Acevedo; 52 Oswaldo Aponte; 17 Diego Bohorquez; 36 Edelson Canelon; 48 Alejandro De La Cruz; 58 Albert Estevez; 27 Osvaldo Heredia; 4 Franklin Mejia; 50 Yerison Mendez; 28 Lizdawin Paulino; 24 Adrian Pena; 23 Ramon Pena; 36 Eliezer Peralta; 48 Andersen Perez; 47 Junior Pina; 30 Guillermo Regalado; -- Maikel Rodriguez; 5 Stiveen Rojas; 51 Onardi Santos	Catchers: 41 Francisco Del Campo; 13 Diego Martinez; 39 Eliecer Mendoza; 33 Moises Morales; Infielders: 17 Maikel Acosta; 22 Bernardo Doc; 19 Steven Herrera; 61 Ronny Muñoz; 3 Rendy Naveo; 37 Jordani Peguero; 35 Yendi Pirela; 1 David Shirley; Outfielders: 47 Angel Bonilla; 11 Jose Camacho; 12 Michael De La Cruz; 21 Jesus Perez	Manager: -- Oscar Escobar; Coaches: -- Arquimedes Cumana (coach); -- Ramon Espinosa (defensive); -- Yohan Pino (pitching); 7-day injured list; * On Miami Marlins 40-man roster; ~ Development list; # Rehab assignment; ∞ Reserve list; ‡ Restricted list; § Suspended list; † Temporarily inactive list; Roster updated November 3, 2026; Transactions; → More rosters: MiLB • Dominican Summer League; → Miami Marlins minor league players

Dominican Summer League Marlins roster
Players		Coaches/Other
Pitchers: 48 Ricardo Arredondo; 7 Justin Batista; 15 Keyner Cedeno; 50 Evan Da Souza; -- Fernando De La Rosa; 10 Luis Espinoza; 32 Ronelbi Garcia; 23 Carlos Guerrero; 17 Abraham Hernandez; 38 Santiago Linares; 35 Bayant Melo; 33 Paul Mendoza; 49 Ricardo Morel; 19 Carlos Ochoa; -- Albert Ortiz; 45 Luis Porfirio; 36 Isaac Prince; 60 Yanixan Resendiz; 11 Jose Rosal	Catchers: 41 Carlos Martinez; 24 Daniel Pena; 39 Daniel Pire; Infielders: 26 Anthony Abreu; 17 Maikel Acosta; 5 Enyer Antonio; 46 Diwarys Encarnacion; 9 Cesar Garcia; 1 Johan Machado; 35 Wanderlin Padilla; 19 Sandy Presbot; 44 Santiago Solarte; Outfielders: 28 Carlos De Los Santos; 18 Raunny Figueredo; 31 Ezequiel Jaime; 22 Ronald Rodriguez	Manager: -- Carlos Mota; Coaches: -- Miguel Fermin (catching); -- César Jiménez (pitching); 7-day injured list; * On Miami Marlins 40-man roster; ~ Development list; # Rehab assignment; ∞ Reserve list; ‡ Restricted list; § Suspended list; † Temporarily inactive list; Roster updated November 2, 2026; Transactions; → More rosters: MiLB • Dominican Summer League; → Miami Marlins minor league players
