= Ryan Weathers =

American baseball player (born 1999)

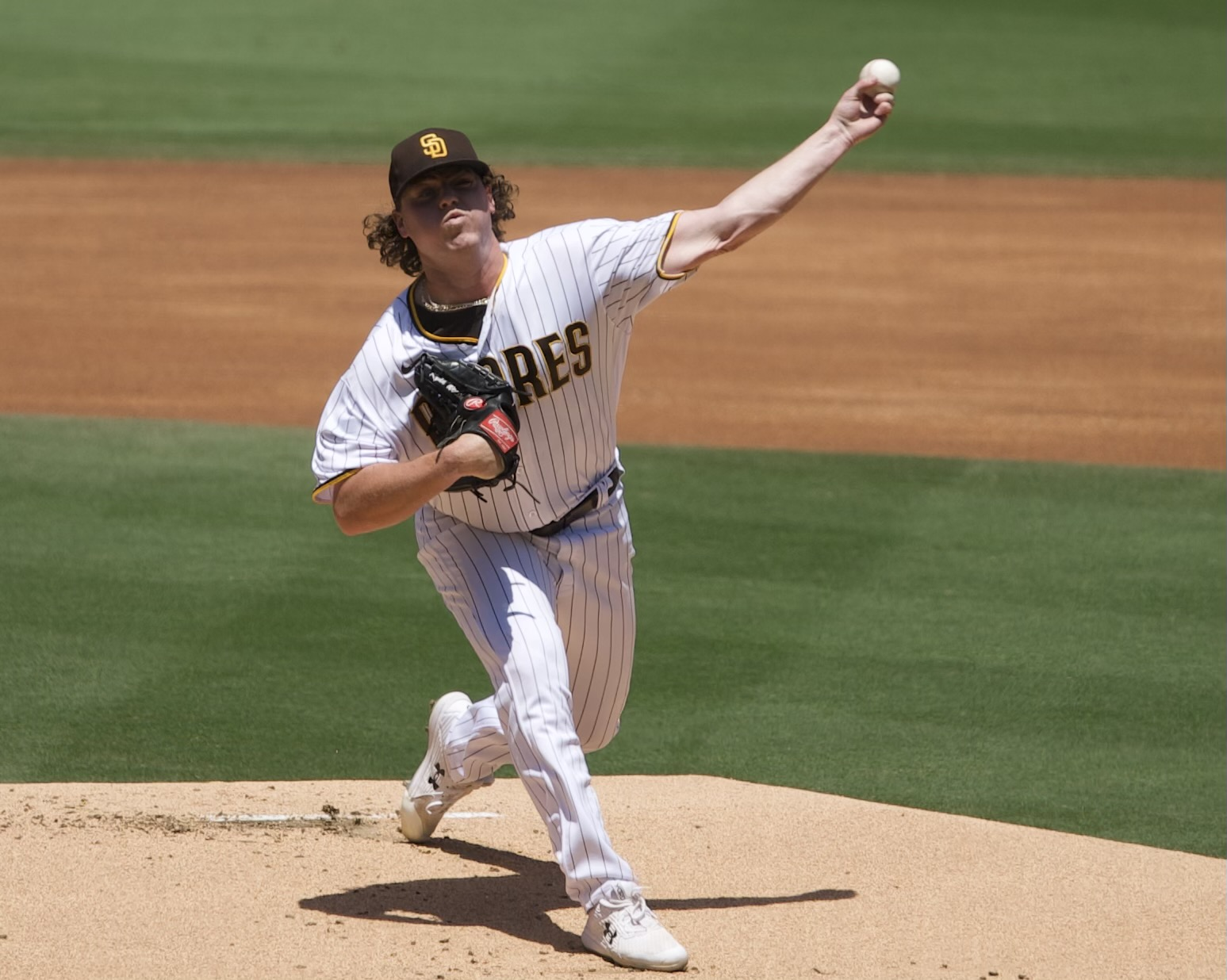
- Weathers with the San Diego Padres in 2021

New York Yankees – No. 40
- Pitcher
- Born: December 17, 1999 (age 26); Loretto, Tennessee, U.S.
- Bats: Right Throws: Left

MLB debut
- October 6, 2020, for the San Diego Padres

MLB statistics (through 2026 season)
- Win–loss record: 17–31
- Earned run average: 4.50
- Strikeouts: 378
- Stats at Baseball Reference

Teams
- San Diego Padres (2020–2023); Miami Marlins (2023–2025); New York Yankees (2026–present)
Medals
Men's baseball
Representing United States
U-18 Baseball World Cup
Gold medal – first place	2017 Thunder Bay	Team

Ryan David Weathers (born December 17, 1999) is an American professional baseball pitcher for the New York Yankees of Major League Baseball (MLB). He has previously played in MLB for the San Diego Padres and Miami Marlins. A left-hander, Weathers made his MLB debut in 2020.

== Amateur career ==
Weathers attended Loretto High School in Loretto, Tennessee. Playing for the school's baseball team, he had a 8–0 win–loss record with an 0.14 earned run average (ERA) and 111 strikeouts in 49 innings pitched as a pitcher and batted .475 with five home runs and 29 runs batted in (RBI) in his junior year. As a senior in 2018, Weathers was the Gatorade National Baseball Player of the Year after going 11–0 with a 0.09 ERA and 148 strikeouts in 76 innings. Weathers committed to Vanderbilt University to play college baseball.

== Professional career ==
=== San Diego Padres ===
The San Diego Padres selected Weathers with the seventh selection in the first round of the 2018 Major League Baseball draft. He signed with the Padres on July 1, 2018, receiving a $5,226,500 signing bonus. He made his professional debut with the Arizona League Padres and was promoted to the Fort Wayne TinCaps in August. In seven starts between the two clubs, Weathers was 0–3 with a 3.44 ERA.

Weathers returned to the TinCaps for the 2019 season, earning Midwest League All-Star honors. Over 22 starts, he pitched to a 3–7 record with a 3.84 ERA over 96 innings, striking out ninety.

On October 6, 2020, Weathers made his major league debut during Game 1 of the 2020 National League Division Series. He was the second pitcher and sixth player in MLB history to make his debut in the postseason. He walked two batters in 1 1/3 scoreless innings.

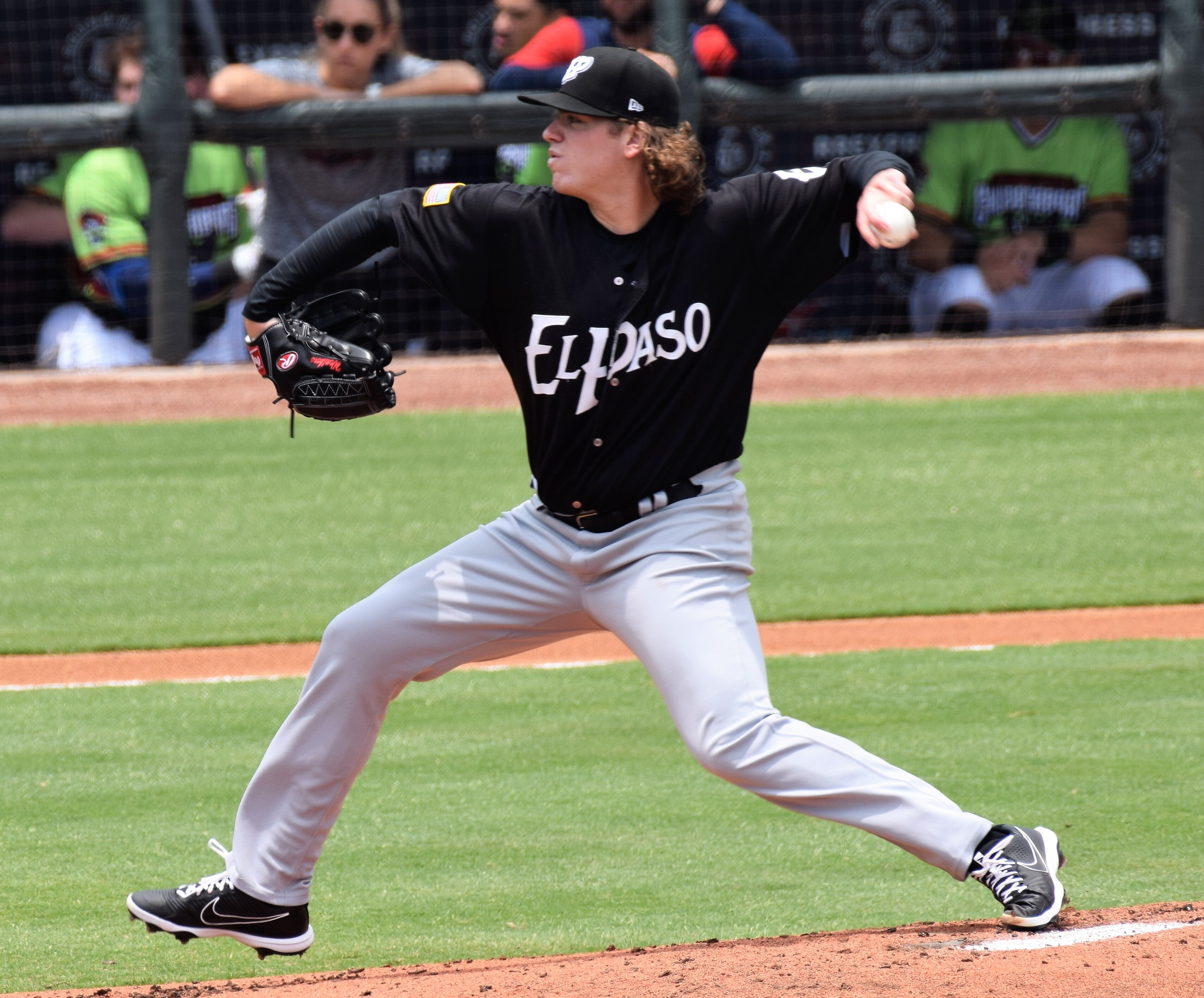
Weathers with El Paso in 2022

Weathers made the Padres' 2021 Opening Day roster out of spring training. On April 16, 2021, he made his first career MLB start against the Los Angeles Dodgers. On July 24, Weathers hit his first career home run, a solo shot off Miami Marlins starter Braxton Garrett. He finished the 2021 season with a 4–7 record and pitched to a 5.32 ERA in 30 games (18 starts).

Weathers appeared in only one MLB game in 2022. On June 15, 2022, he started for the Padres, pitched 3.2 innings, gave up four runs, and received a no-decision. He was sent down to the minor leagues the following day.

In 2023, Weathers appeared in 12 MLB games (10 starts) for the Padres. He amassed a 1-6 record and a 6.25 ERA.

=== Miami Marlins ===
On August 1, 2023, the Padres traded Weathers to the Miami Marlins in exchange for Garrett Cooper and Sean Reynolds. He made three appearances (two starts) down the stretch, logging an 0–2 record and 7.62 ERA with 14 strikeouts across 13 innings pitched.

Weathers began the 2024 campaign as part of Miami's rotation. In 13 starts, he compiled a 3–5 record and 3.55 ERA with 67 strikeouts over 71 innings. Weathers was placed on the injured list with a left index finger strain on June 8 and was transferred to the 60-day injured list on July 7. He was activated on September 18 and made three more starts to conclude the year.

On March 20, 2025, it was announced that Weathers would miss at least four-to-six weeks due to a left forearm strain. On June 9, Weathers was placed on the 60-day injured list due to a left lat strain. He was activated from the injured list on September 11. For the season, Weathers made eight starts and pitched to a 2–2 record with a 3.99 ERA.

=== New York Yankees ===
On January 13, 2026, the Marlins traded Weathers to the New York Yankees in exchange for Dillon Lewis, Brendan Jones, Dylan Jasso, and Juan Matheus.

== Personal life ==
Weathers is the son of former MLB pitcher David Weathers. He and his wife, Thayer, had a son in April 2026.
