= Thomas White (baseball) =

American baseball player (born 2004)

Miami Marlins – No. 35
- Pitcher
- Born: September 29, 2004 (age 21); Rowley, Massachusetts, U.S.
- Bats: Left Throws: Left
- Stats at Baseball Reference

Thomas Michael White (born September 29, 2004) is an American professional baseball pitcher in the Miami Marlins organization.

== Amateur career ==
White grew up in Rowley, Massachusetts and attended Phillips Academy in Andover, Massachusetts. He went 6-1 with a 0.21 ERA as a junior and was named the Massachusetts Gatorade Player of the Year. White repeated as the Gatorade Player of the Year in 2023 after going 5-2 with a 1.66 ERA and 95 strikeouts and allowing just 10 hits over 42 innings pitched during his senior season. He committed to play college baseball at Vanderbilt University.

== Professional career ==
The Miami Marlins selected White in the first round, with the 35th overall selection, of the 2023 Major League Baseball draft. On July 23, 2023, White signed with the Marlins on an above slot deal worth $4.1 million.

White made his professional debut after signing with the Florida Complex League Marlins and also played with the Jupiter Hammerheads, appearing in three games between the two teams. In 2024, he split the season between Jupiter and the Beloit Snappers. Over 21 starts between the two teams, White went 6-4 with a 2.81 ERA and 120 strikeouts over 96 innings. White opened 2025 with Beloit and was promoted to the Double-A Pensacola Blue Wahoos and Triple-A Jacksonville Jumbo Shrimp during the season. White started a total of 21 games with the three teams, going 4-3 with a 2.31 ERA and 145 strikeouts over 89 2/3 innings.

On June 5, 2026, White was diagnosed with a capsular sprain in his throwing shoulder, ruling him out for three-to-four months.
