= Jacob Miller (baseball) =

American baseball player (born 2003)

Miami Marlins
- Pitcher
- Born: August 10, 2003 (age 22); Columbus, Ohio, U.S.
- Bats: Right Throws: Right

Jacob Lee Miller (born August 10, 2003) is an American professional baseball pitcher in the Miami Marlins organization.

== Amateur career ==
Miller grew up in Baltimore, Ohio, and attended Liberty Union High School. He committed to play college baseball at the University of Louisville as a freshman in high school. As a junior, Miller went 9–1 with 143 strikeouts and a 0.70 ERA in 60 innings pitched. He was named the Ohio Gatorade Player of the Year in his senior season after going 9–1 with 133 strikeouts in 57 innings pitched. He was also named the All-Metro Player of the Year by the Columbus Dispatch. Miller also played basketball and ran track at Liberty Union. He was rated the best prospect for the Major League Baseball (MLB) draft in the state of Ohio.

== Professional career ==
Miller was selected by the Miami Marlins with the 46th overall pick of the 2022 MLB draft. He signed with the team and received a $1,679,900 signing bonus.

Miller made his professional debut after signing with the Florida Complex League Marlins and also played with the Jupiter Hammerheads, appearing in four games between both teams. In 2023, he played with the FCL Marlins and Jupiter, going 2–4 with a 4.36 ERA over 16 games. Miller played the 2024 season with the Beloit Snappers and Pensacola Blue Wahoos and pitched to a 6–6 record, 3.85 ERA, and 93 strikeouts over 114 2/3 innings and 23 starts. Miller returned to Pensacola for the 2025 season, starting 22 games and going 3–7 with a 4.59 ERA and 110 strikeouts over 117 2/3 innings. He returned to Pensacola in 2026.
