= Owen Wild =

American baseball player (born 2002)

Tampa Bay Rays
- Pitcher
- Born: July 30, 2002 (age 24); Sacramento, California, U.S.
- Bats: Right Throws: Right

Owen Andrew Wild (born July 30, 2002) is an American professional baseball pitcher in the Tampa Bay Rays organization.

== Amateur career ==
Wild attended Gig Harbor High School in Gig Harbor, Washington, where he played baseball. As a junior in 2019, he went 9–3 with a 1.26 ERA and 112 strikeouts over 78 innings. After graduating, Wild played three seasons of college baseball at Gonzaga University. He also played in various summer leagues, including the West Coast League and Alaska Baseball League. As a junior at Gonzaga in 2023, Wild started 15 games and went 4–7 with a 4.93 ERA and 105 strikeouts over 95 innings.

== Professional career ==
Wild was selected by the Tampa Bay Rays in the seventh round of the 2023 Major League Baseball draft. He signed with the team for $238,100.

Wild made his professional debut with the Florida Complex League Rays, appearing in one game. He opened the 2024 season with the Charleston RiverDogs and was promoted to the Bowling Green Hot Rods in mid-May. Over 22 starts between the two teams, Wild went 7–1 with a 2.82 ERA and 151 strikeouts over 121 1/3 innings. He was assigned to the Montgomery Biscuits to open the 2025 season. Wild played the whole season with the Biscuits and started 23 games, going 7–8 with a 4.71 ERA and 96 strikeouts across 105 innings. In 2026, he played with Montgomery and the Durham Bulls and made 45 relief appearances in which he went 4–4 with a 4.60 ERA and 82 strikeouts over 60 2/3 innings.

== International play ==
Wild played for Team Great Britain in the 2026 World Baseball Classic.
