= Brendan Jones (baseball) =

Miami Marlins – No. 89
- Outfielder
- Born: April 24, 2002 (age 24); Nashville, Tennessee, U.S.
- Bats: Left Throws: Left

Brendan Tyler Jones (born April 24, 2002) is an American professional baseball outfielder in the Miami Marlins organization.

== Amateur career ==
Jones attended Goodpasture Christian School in Madison, Tennessee, and Kansas State University, where he played college baseball for the Kansas State Wildcats. In 2021, he played collegiate summer baseball for the Pittsfield Suns of the Futures Collegiate Baseball League.

== Professional career ==
The New York Yankees selected him in the 12th round of the 2024 Major League Baseball draft. He began the 2025 season with the Hudson Valley Renegades and was promoted to the Somerset Patriots. He was named the Eastern League's player of the week for July 7-13.

On January 13, 2026, the Yankees traded Jones, Dillon Lewis, Dylan Jasso, and Juan Matheus to the Miami Marlins in exchange for Ryan Weathers.
