= Brayden Taylor =

American baseball player (born 2002)

Miami Marlins
- Infielder
- Born: May 22, 2002 (age 24); West Jordan, Utah, U.S.
- Bats: Left Throws: Right
- Stats at Baseball Reference
Medals
Men's baseball
Representing the United States
Haarlem Baseball Week
Bronze medal – third place	2022	Team

Brayden Kerry Taylor (born May 22, 2002) is an American professional baseball infielder in the Miami Marlins organization.

== Amateur career ==
Taylor attended Copper Hills High School in West Jordan, Utah, where he played on their baseball team. He achieved all-state honors as a junior in 2019 after he batted .443 with ten stolen bases. He was ranked No. 188 in the nation by Perfect Game heading into his senior season. He only played in three games during his senior season in 2020 due to it being cancelled due to the COVID-19 pandemic.

He went unselected in the 2020 Major League Baseball draft, and enrolled at Texas Christian University (TCU) to play college baseball. Taylor was named TCU's starting third baseman as a freshman in 2021. Over 58 starts, he batted .324 with a team-high 12 home runs, 53 RBIs, 49 walks and 15 stolen bases alongside a .924 fielding percentage. He was named the Big 12 Conference Freshman of the Year. In the summer he played for the Falmouth Commodores of the Cape Cod League. He batted .269/.361/.385, and on defense split his time between second base and third base.

As a sophomore in 2022, Taylor played in 59 games (58 starts) and hit .314 with 13 home runs, fifty RBIs, and 55 walks compared to forty strikeouts. After the season, he briefly played in the Cape Cod Baseball League with the Falmouth Commodores, batting .242. He was also named to and played with the USA Baseball Collegiate National Team. As a junior for TCU in 2023, Taylor appeared in 67 games and batted .308 with 23 home runs and seventy RBIs.

== Professional career ==
=== Tampa Bay Rays ===
Taylor was selected by the Tampa Bay Rays in the first round, with the 19th overall selection, of 2023 Major League Baseball draft. On July 21, 2023, Taylor signed with the Rays on for the full-slot value of $3,880,100.

Taylor made his professional debut after signing with the Florida Complex League Rays and ended the season with the Charleston RiverDogs, batting .242 with five home runs and 15 RBI over 25 games. Taylor opened the 2024 season with the Bowling Green Hot Rods and was promoted to the Montgomery Biscuits in July. Over 114 games between the two teams, he hit .250 with twenty home runs, 62 RBI, and 29 stolen bases. He was assigned back to Montgomery for the 2025 season. Across 108 games, Taylor hit .173 with eight home runs, 43 RBI, and 17 stolen bases.

Taylor opened the 2026 season with Montgomery, batting .284/.384/.513 with 17 home runs, 56 RBI, and 20 stolen bases across 88 games.

=== Miami Marlins ===
On August 3, 2026 the Rays traded Taylor, Jacob Kisting, and Adrian Santana to the Miami Marlins in exchange for Liam Hicks.
