= Tampa Bay Rays minor league players =

Below is a partial list of minor league baseball players in the Tampa Bay Rays system:

== Players ==
=== Alexander Alberto ===
Alexander Alberto

Tampa Bay Rays
- Pitcher
- Born: November 2, 2001 (age 25); Santo Domingo, Dominican Republic
- Bats: Right Throws: Right

Alexander Alberto (born November 2, 2001) is a Dominican baseball pitcher for the Tampa Bay Rays of Major League Baseball (MLB).

Alberto signed with the Tampa Bay Rays as an international free agent on November 25, 2019. He did not play in a game in 2020 due to the cancellation of the minor league season because of the COVID-19 pandemic. Alberto made his professional debut in 2021 with the Dominican Summer League Rays.

On December 10, 2025, the Chicago White Sox selected Alberto from the Rays in the Rule 5 draft. He was returned to Tampa Bay after clearing waivers on March 19, 2026. Alberto made 49 appearances split between the Double–A Montgomery Biscuits and Triple–A Durham Bulls, posting a cumulative 3–1 record and 3.43 ERA with 72 strikeouts and five saves across 60 1/3 innings pitched. On November 2, Alberto was added to Tampa Bay's 40–man roster.

- Career statistics from Baseball Reference (Minors)

=== Jadher Areinamo ===
Jadher Areinamo

Tampa Bay Rays – No. 45
- Outfielder
- Born: November 28, 2003 (age 22); Maracay, Venezuela
- Bats: Right Throws: Right

Jadher Alejandro Areinamo (born November 28, 2003) is a Venezuelan professional baseball infielder for the Tampa Bay Rays of Major League Baseball (MLB).

Areinamo signed with the Milwaukee Brewers as an international free agent in January 2021.

On July 28, 2025 the Brewers traded Areinamo to the Tampa Bay Rays in exchange for Danny Jansen. He made 38 appearances down the stretch for the Double-A Montgomery Biscuits, batting .255/.316/.397 with four home runs, 19 RBI, and six stolen bases. On November 18, the Rays added Areinamo to their 40-man roster to protect him from the Rule 5 draft.

Areinamo played for the Tiburones de La Guaira in the 2025–26 LVBP season; he led the league in slugging percentage (.692) and (1.112). He was awarded the LVBP's rookie of the year honors. Areinamo was optioned to the Triple-A Durham Bulls to begin the 2026 season.

- Career statistics from Baseball Reference (Minors)

=== Ben Blair ===
Ben Blair

Tampa Bay Rays
- Pitcher
- Born: March 25, 2005 (age 21); Danville, Virginia, U.S.
- Bats: Right Throws: Right

Benjamin Robert Blair (born March 25, 2005) is an American professional baseball pitcher in the Tampa Bay Rays organization.

Blair attended Liberty Christian Academy in Lynchburg, Virginia and played college baseball at Liberty University. During his college career he went 17–13 with a 3.58 earned run average (ERA) with 249 strikeouts.

Blair was selected by the Tampa Bay Rays in the second round of the 2026 Major League Baseball draft. He signed on July 18.

- Career statistics from Baseball Reference (Minors)

=== Anderson Brito ===
Anderson Brito

Tampa Bay Rays
- Pitcher
- Born: July 7, 2004 (age 22); Sucre, Venezuela
- Bats: Right Throws: Right

Anderson Alexander Brito (born July 7, 2004) is a Venezuelan professional baseball pitcher in the Tampa Bay Rays organization.

Brito signed with the Houston Astros as an international free agent in November 2023. He spent his first professional season in 2024 with the Dominican Summer League Astros, Florida Complex League Astros and Fayetteville Woodpeckers.

Brito spent the 2025 season with the High-A Asheville Tourists, recording a 3.28 ERA with 65 strikeouts over 25 starts.

On December 19, 2025, the Astros sent Brito to the Tampa Bay Rays in a three-team trade in which the Rays also acquired Jacob Melton, the Pittsburgh Pirates acquired Brandon Lowe, Jake Mangum, and Mason Montgomery, and the Astros acquired Mike Burrows.

- Career statistics from Baseball Reference (Minors)

=== Homer Bush Jr. ===
Homer Bush Jr.

Tampa Bay Rays
- Outfielder
- Born: October 13, 2001 (age 25); Grapevine, Texas, U.S.
- Bats: Right Throws: Right

Homer Bush Jr. (born October 13, 2001) is an American professional baseball outfielder in the Tampa Bay Rays organization.

Bush grew up in Toronto.

Bush Jr. attended Carroll Senior High School in Southlake, Texas and played college baseball at Grand Canyon University. In 2022, he played collegiate summer baseball with the Yarmouth–Dennis Red Sox of the Cape Cod Baseball League and was named a league all-star. He was drafted by the San Diego Padres in the fourth round of the 2023 Major League Baseball draft.

Bush Jr. signed with the Padres and made his professional debut with the Arizona Complex League Padres. He was later promoted to the Lake Elsinore Storm and San Antonio Missions.

On July 28, 2024, Bush, Dylan Lesko, and J.D. Gonzalez were traded to the Tampa Bay Rays in exchange for Jason Adam.

His father, Homer Bush, was also drafted by the Padres and played in Major League Baseball (MLB).

- Career statistics from MLB · ESPN · Fangraphs · Baseball Reference (Minors)

=== Ryan Cermak ===
Ryan Cermak

Tampa Bay Rays
- Outfielder
- Born: June 2, 2001 (age 25); Hinsdale, Illinois, U.S.
- Bats: Right Throws: Right

Ryan Austin Cermak (born June 2, 2001) is an American professional baseball outfielder in the Tampa Bay Rays organization. He played college baseball for the Illinois State Redbirds.

Cermak grew up in Riverside, Illinois and attended Riverside Brookfield High School, where he played baseball and basketball.

Cermak played college baseball for the Illinois State Redbirds for three seasons. He slashed .208/.296/.396 with three doubles, two home runs, and seven RBI in 13 games during his true freshman season in 2020 before it was cut short due to the coronavirus pandemic. In 2021, Cermak was named first-team Missouri Valley Conference (MVC) after batting .284 with 11 home runs and 40 RBI over 55 games. As a junior in 2022, he repeated as a first-team All-MVC selection after hitting .340 with 19 home runs and 43 RBI across 48 games.

Cermak was selected in the Competitive Balance section of the second round of the 2022 Major League Baseball draft. He signed with the Rays on July 21, 2022, and received a $750,000 signing bonus. Cermak was assigned to the Florida Complex League Rays to make his professional debut and batted .273 with two home runs and five RBI in seven games. In 2023, Cermak was assigned to the Charleston RiverDogs and also made a rehab appearance with the FCL Rays, hitting .265 with six home runs over 43 games. Cermak missed time due to injury again in 2024 and played with the FCL Rays and Bowling Green Hot Rods and batted .211 with four home runs and 15 stolen bases across 52 games. In 2025, he played in 31 games between the FCL Rays and Bowling Green, hitting .269 with six home runs.

- Career statistics from MLB · Baseball Reference (Minors)
- Illinois State Redbirds bio

=== Cooper Flemming ===
Cooper Flemming

Tampa Bay Rays
- Infielder
- Born: August 5, 2006 (age 20); Atlanta, Georgia, U.S.
- Bats: Left Throws: Right

Cooper James Flemming (born August 5, 2006) is an American professional baseball infielder in the Tampa Bay Rays organization.

Flemming was born in Atlanta, Georgia and moved to California when he was eight. He attended Aliso Niguel High School in Aliso Viejo, California. As a senior, he was the Orange County Register All-Orange County baseball player of the year after hitting .407 with six home runs and 27 runs batted in as a hitter and went 7–1 with a .069 earned run average (ERA) and 66 strikeouts as a pitcher.

Flemming was selected by the Tampa Bay Rays in the second round of the 2025 Major League Baseball draft. He made his professional debut in 2026 with the Charleston RiverDogs.

- Career statistics from Baseball Reference (Minors)

=== Nathan Flewelling ===
Nathan Flewelling

Tampa Bay Rays
- Catcher
- Born: November 11, 2006 (age 20); Red Deer, Alberta, Canada
- Bats: Left Throws: Right

Nathan Curtis Flewelling (born November 11, 2006) is a Canadian professional baseball catcher in the Tampa Bay Rays organization.

Flewelling attended St. Joseph High School in Red Deer, Alberta, Canada. In 2023 and 2024 he played summer baseball for the Sylvan Lake Gulls in the Western Canadian Baseball League. He was selected by the Tampa Bay Rays in the third round of the 2024 Major League Baseball draft.

Flewelling played his first professional season in 2025 with the Charleston RiverDogs and Bowling Green Hot Rods.

Flewelling was assigned to Bowling Green to begin the 2026 campaign. Flewelling was named to the MLB All-Star Futures Game at midseason; he subsequently won the MVP award for the game after hitting a two–run homer off of Philadelphia Phillies prospect Wen Hui Pan. He made 106 total appearances for Bowling Green, batting .243/.364/.452 with 21 home runs and 67 RBI.

- Career statistics from Baseball Reference (Minors)

=== Taitn Gray ===
Taitn Gray

Tampa Bay Rays
- First baseman
- Born: August 16, 2007 (age 19); Des Moines, Iowa, U.S.
- Bats: Switch Throws: Right

Taitn Allen Gray (born August 16, 2007) is an American professional baseball first baseman in the Tampa Bay Rays organization.

Gray attended Dallas Center–Grimes High School in Grimes, Iowa. As a senior in 2025, he hit .538 with 14 home runs and 39 RBI and was named the Iowa Gatorade Baseball Player of the Year. He attended the 2025 MLB Draft Combine. Gray originally committed to play college baseball for the Notre Dame Fighting Irish. He later switched his commitment to the Oregon Ducks.

Gray was selected by the Tampa Bay Rays in the third round of the 2025 Major League Baseball draft. He made his professional debut in 2026 with the Single-A Charleston RiverDogs. On June 1, he was placed on the injured list. He underwent elbow surgery and returned to Charleston on July 28 following a rehab assignment with the Florida Complex League Rays. Across 76 games with Charleston, Gray hit .296 with eight home runs and 52 RBI.

- Career statistics from Baseball Reference (Minors)

=== Trevor Harrison ===
Trevor Harrison

Tampa Bay Rays
- Pitcher
- Born: August 8, 2005 (age 21); Safety Harbor, Florida, U.S.
- Bats: Right Throws: Right

Trevor Michael Harrison (born August 8, 2005) is an American professional baseball pitcher in the Tampa Bay Rays organization.

Harrison attended J. W. Mitchell High School in Trinity, Florida. He was selected by the Tampa Bay Rays in the fifth round of the 2023 Major League Baseball draft. He signed for $847,500, forgoing his commitment to play college baseball at Florida State University.

Harrison signed with the Rays and spent his first professional season in 2024 with the Florida Complex League Rays and Charleston RiverDogs.

- Career statistics from Baseball Reference (Minors)

=== K. C. Hunt ===
K. C. Hunt

Tampa Bay Rays
- Pitcher
- Born: July 14, 2000 (age 26); Wyckoff, New Jersey, U.S.
- Bats: Left Throws: Right

Kyle Clemente Hunt (born July 14, 2000) is an American professional baseball pitcher in Tampa Bay Rays organization.

Hunt attended Ramapo High School in Franklin Lakes, New Jersey and played college baseball at Mississippi State University. He was selected by the Pittsburgh Pirates in the 12th round of the 2022 Major League Baseball draft, but did not sign and returned to Mississippi State for his senior year. In 2021 and 2023, he played collegiate summer baseball with the Falmouth Commodores of the Cape Cod Baseball League. After going unselected in the 2023 MLB draft, he signed with the Milwaukee Brewers as an undrafted free agent.

Hunt made his professional debut with the Arizona Complex League Brewers. He pitched 2024 with the Carolina Mudcats, Wisconsin Timber Rattlers and Biloxi Shuckers. The Brewers named him their co-Minor League Pitchers of the Year.

On March 24, 2026, Hunt was traded to the Tampa Bay Rays in exchange for Jake Woodford.

- Career statistics from Baseball Reference (Minors)

=== Xavier Isaac ===
Xavier Isaac

Tampa Bay Rays
- First baseman
- Born: December 17, 2003 (age 22); Fayetteville, North Carolina, U.S.
- Bats: Left Throws: Left

Xavier Francis Isaac (born December 17, 2003) is an American professional baseball first baseman for the Tampa Bay Rays.

Isaac graduated from East Forsyth High School in Kernersville, North Carolina. He was named an All-American in 2022. He committed to play college baseball at the University of Florida.

The Tampa Bay Rays selected Isaac in the first round, with the 29th overall selection, of the 2022 Major League Baseball draft. He signed with the Rays, receiving a $2.5 million signing bonus. He made his professional debut after signing with the Florida Complex League Rays, appearing in five games.

Isaac opened the 2023 season with the Charleston RiverDogs and was promoted to the Bowling Green Hot Rods near the season's end, hitting .285 with 19 home runs and 72 RBI over 102 games. He played the 2024 season with Bowling Green and the Montgomery Biscuits, batting .264 with 18 home runs and 78 RBI over 102 games. After the season, he played in the Arizona Fall League for the Mesa Solar Sox. Isaac was assigned to Montgomery to open the 2025 season. Isaac missed time due to injury, and was placed on the injured list in early July, ending his season. Following the season, Isaac noted that he had undergone "life-saving" brain surgery. On November 17, 2026, He had his contract selected to the 40-man roster to protect him from the Rule 5 draft.

- Career statistics from Baseball Reference (Minors)

=== Tre' Morgan ===
Tre' Morgan
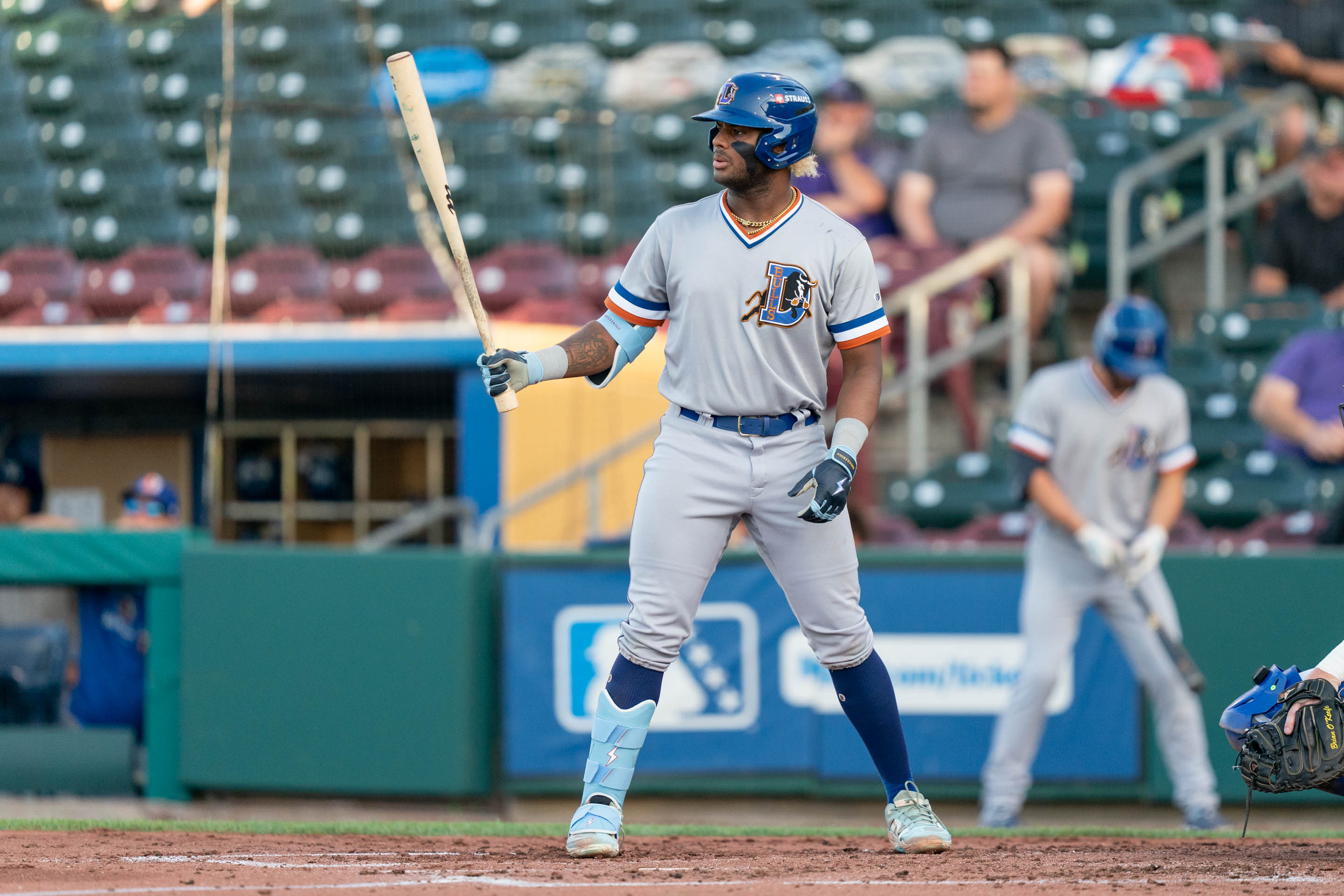
- Morgan with the Durham Bulls in 2025

Tampa Bay Rays
- First baseman
- Born: July 16, 2002 (age 24); New Orleans, Louisiana, U.S.
- Bats: Left Throws: Left

John Edward Morgan III (born July 16, 2002) is an American professional baseball first baseman in the Tampa Bay Rays organization.

Morgan attended Brother Martin High School in New Orleans, Louisiana, where he played baseball. As a junior in 2019, he batted .483 with 16 stolen bases. He did not play a game as a senior in 2020 after suffering a UCL injury as well as the COVID-19 pandemic, which ended Brother Martin's season after 13 games. Morgan went unselected in the shortened 2020 Major League Baseball draft and enrolled at Louisiana State University (LSU) to play college baseball.

As a freshman for LSU in 2021, Morgan played in 63 games and hit .357 with six home runs, 42 RBIs, and 15 stolen bases. He batted .324 with five home runs and 54 RBIs over 62 games as a sophomore in 2022, and spent that summer playing for the United States national baseball team. As a junior in 2023, he played in 69 games and batted .316 with nine home runs and 53 RBIs, helping lead LSU to win the 2023 Men's College World Series. After the season, Morgan was drafted by the Tampa Bay Rays in the third round with the 88th overall pick of the 2023 Major League Baseball draft. He signed with the team for $783,800.

Morgan made his professional debut with the Florida Complex League Rays and was quickly promoted to the Charleston RiverDogs. Over 14 games between the two teams, he hit .396 with one home run and six RBIs. Morgan opened the 2024 season with Charleston and was promoted to the Bowling Green Hot Rods in mid-May. He was selected to represent the Rays (alongside Xavier Isaac and Chandler Simpson) in the All-Star Futures Game at Globe Life Field. He was promoted once again, to the Montgomery Biscuits, in late August. Over 100 games between the three teams, Morgan batted .324 with ten home runs, 68 RBIs, and twenty stolen bases. Morgan was assigned to the Durham Bulls to open the 2025 season, missing the beginning of the season due to a quad injury. He played a total of 92 games with Durham and hit .274 with eight home runs and 45 RBIs. Morgan returned to Durham for the 2026 season and batted .241 with nine home runs and 25 RBIs over 57 games, missing time due to an injury.

- Career statistics from MLB · ESPN · Fangraphs · Baseball Reference (Minors)
- LSU Tigers bio

=== TJ Nichols ===
TJ Nichols

Tampa Bay Rays
- Pitcher
- Born: June 24, 2002 (age 24); Carmichael, California, U.S.
- Bats: Right Throws: Right

Timothy James Nichols (born June 24, 2002) is an American professional baseball pitcher in the Tampa Bay Rays organization.

Nichols attended Oakmont High School in Roseville, California and played college baseball at the University of Arizona. He was selected by the Tampa Bay Rays in the sixth round of the 2023 Major League Baseball draft.

Nichols made his professional debut in 2023 with the Florida Complex League Rays and pitched 2024 with the Charleston RiverDogs. He started 2025 with the Bowling Green Hot Rods before being promoted to the Montgomery Biscuits.

- Career statistics from Baseball Reference (Minors)

=== Austin Overn ===
Austin Overn

Tampa Bay Rays
- Outfielder
- Born: May 10, 2003 (age 23); Orange, California, U.S.
- Bats: Left Throws: Right

Austin Michael Overn (born May 10, 2003) is an American professional baseball outfielder in the Tampa Bay Rays organization.

Overn attended Foothill High School in Santa Ana, California, where he played baseball, football, basketball, and ran track. After graduating in 2022, he played two years of college baseball at the University of Southern California for the Trojans. Overn was also a walk-on for the 2022 USC Trojans football team as a wide receiver. During his freshman season with the Trojans in 2023, Overn started 58 games and batted .314 with four home runs and 38 RBI. After the season, he played in the Cape Cod Baseball League (CCBL) with the Orleans Firebirds. As a sophomore in 2024, Overn batted .270 with eight home runs and 32 RBI over 59 games. He returned to play in the CCBL with the Chatham Anglers.

Overn was selected by the Baltimore Orioles in the third round of the 2024 Major League Baseball draft. He signed with the team for $847,500. Overn made his professional debut after signing with the Delmarva Shorebirds and also played with the Aberdeen IronBirds, hitting .280 with 16 stolen bases over 21 games. He was assigned to Aberdeen to open the 2025 season and was promoted to the Chesapeake Baysox in August. Over 114 games between both teams, Overn batted .249 with 13 home runs, 43 RBI, and 64 stolen bases.

On December 19, 2025, the Orioles traded Overn (alongside Slater de Brun, Caden Bodine, and Michael Forret) to the Tampa Bay Rays in exchange for Shane Baz. The Rays assigned Overn to the Montgomery Biscuits for the 2026 season. He missed a majority of June after being placed on the injured list with an undisclosed injury, and completed a three game rehab assignment with the Florida Complex League Rays. Overn played in 61 games for Montgomery and hit .309 with 15 home runs, 41 RBI, and 48 stolen bases.

- Career statistics from Baseball Reference (Minors)
- USC Trojans bio

=== Jacob Watters ===
Jacob Watters

Tampa Bay Rays
- Pitcher
- Born: March 3, 2001 (age 25); Rocky Gap, Virginia, U.S.
- Bats: Right Throws: Right

Jacob Watters (born March 3, 2001) is an American professional baseball pitcher for the Tampa Bay Rays organization.

Watters attended Bland County High School and West Virginia University. In 2021, he played collegiate summer baseball with the Chatham Anglers of the Cape Cod Baseball League. The Oakland Athletics selected Watters in the fourth round, with the 124th overall selection, of the 2022 MLB draft. On December 14, 2024, the Athletics traded Watters, Joe Boyle, Will Simpson, and a Competitive Balance Round A pick in the 2025 Major League Baseball draft to the Tampa Bay Rays for Jeffrey Springs and Jacob Lopez.

Watters' cousin, Jason Michaels, played in the major leagues.

- Career statistics from Baseball Reference (Minors)

== Full Triple-A to Rookie League rosters ==
=== Triple-A ===
Durham Bulls roster
Players		Coaches/Other
Pitchers: 17 Hunter Bigge *; 60 Chris Clark; 65 Mason Englert *; 26 Michael Grove *; 54 Marcus Johnson; -- Ty Johnson *; 31 Trevor Martin *; 19 Evan Reifert; 12 Chase Solesky *; -- Brian Van Belle; -- Austin Vernon; 28 Kodi Whitley; 34 Owen Wild; 29 Logan Workman	Catchers: 12 Caden Bodine; 22 Logan Driscoll; 43 Tatem Levins; Infielders: 36 Chris Clark; 22 Xavier Isaac; 9 Tre' Morgan; Outfielders: 35 Homer Bush Jr.; 16 Jake Cave *; 7 Jacob Melton *	Manager: 14 Morgan Ensberg; Coaches: 66 Henry Bonilla (bullpen); 15 Reid Brignac (coach); 1 Keoni DeRenne (hitting); 38 Brian Reith (pitching); 32 German Melendez (bench); 7-day injured list; * On Tampa Bay Rays 40-man roster; ~ Development list; # Rehab assignment; ∞ Reserve list; ‡ Restricted list; § Suspended list; † Temporarily inactive list; Roster updated November 2, 2026; Transactions; → More rosters: MiLB • International League; → Tampa Bay Rays minor league players

=== Double-A ===
Montgomery Biscuits roster
Players		Coaches/Other
Pitchers: 24 Jackson Baumeister; 19 Jonny Cuevas; 35 Drew Dowd; 38 Derrick Edington; 25 Garrett Edwards; 12 T.J. Fondtain; 29 Roel Garcia III; 31 Luis Guerrero; 30 K. C. Hunt; 37 Andrew Lindsey; 44 Tommy McCollum; 17 TJ Nichols; 21 Hayden Snelsire; 34 Santiago Suarez; -- Jacob Watters; 14 Junior William; 88 Alfredo Zarraga	Catchers: 5 Bryan Broecker; Infielders: 1 Gregory Barrios; 8 Cooper Kinney; 16 Mac Horvath; 3 Kamren James; 10 Will Simpson; 9 Ryan Spikes; Outfielders: 4 Theo Gillen; 6 Connor Hujsak; 7 Brock Jones; 33 Justyn-Henry Malloy; 6 Austin Overn	Manager: 22 Kevin Boles; Coaches: 27 Esteban Gonzalez (coach); 26 Braxton Martinez (hitting); 20 Jim Paduch (pitching); 2 Ronnie Richardson (bench); 7-day injured list; * On Tampa Bay Rays 40-man roster; ~ Development list; # Rehab assignment; ∞ Reserve list; ‡ Restricted list; § Suspended list; † Temporarily inactive list; Roster updated November 2, 2026; Transactions; → More rosters: MiLB • Southern League; → Tampa Bay Rays minor league players

=== High-A ===
Bowling Green Hot Rods roster
Players		Coaches/Other
Pitchers: 2 Ryan Andrade; 35 Noah Beal; 27 Jadon Bercovich; 16 Anderson Brito; 25 Alexander Campos; 38 Cade Citelli; 12 Kaleb Corbett; 32 Dominic Fritton; 5 Garrett Gainey; 34 Andres Galan; 21 Trevor Harrison; 18 Jacob Hartlaub; 25 Jack Kartsonas; 33 Blake Morgan; -- Chandler Murphy; 29 Mason Nichols; 28 Dominic Niman; 33 Trey Pooser; 11 Andy Rodriguez; 9 Jonathan Russell; 13 Jose Urbina	Catchers: 20 Nathan Flewelling; Infielders: 1 Nicandro Aybar; 26 Ryan Cermak; 16 Carlos Colmenarez; 8 Felix Cotes; 9 Ricardo Gonzalez; 22 Larry Martinez; 31 Ryan McCoy; 7 Jose Perez; 6 Narciso Polanco; 15 Tony Santa Maria; Outfielders: 23 Noah Myers; 30 Brendan Summerhill; 17 Marshall Toole	Manager: 10 Rafael Valenzuela; Coaches: 41 Ryan Pennell (pitching); 4 Perry Roth (bench); 24 Brett Schneider (hitting); 7-day injured list; * On Tampa Bay Rays 40-man roster; ~ Development list; # Rehab assignment; ∞ Reserve list; ‡ Restricted list; § Suspended list; † Temporarily inactive list; Roster updated November 2, 2026; Transactions; → More rosters: MiLB • South Atlantic League; → Tampa Bay Rays minor league players

=== Single-A ===
Charleston RiverDogs roster
Players		Coaches/Other
Pitchers: 18 Aidan Cremarosa; 26 Cesar De Jesus; -- Steven Gonzalez; 34 Aidan Haugh; -- Danny Hilario; 13 Jordi Infante; 15 Luke Jackson; -- Brady Jones; 26 Brayden Jones; 22 Jacob Kuhn; 27 Dylan Lesko; -- Marbin Lezcano; 15 Eric Lin; 30 Xavier Lopez; 32 Brady Marget; 33 Alvaro Mejias; 8 Trendan Parish; 33 Trace Phillips; 30 Jeremy Pilon; 29 Efrailin Ramos; 16 Bryce Shaffer; 9 Nate Smithburg; 39 Riley Stanford; 31 Ethan Storm; 4 Yereny Teus; 23 Miguel Toscano; 35 Alex Wallace	Catchers: 28 Brody Donay; 5 Yirer Garcia; 17 J.D. Gonzalez; 32 Taitn Gray; 26 Andres Torres; Infielders: 25 Andreimi Antunez; 21 Grady Emerson; 11 Cooper Flemming; 19 Jack Lines; 20 Alberth Palma; 7 Daniel Pierce; Outfielders: 2 Derek Datil; 2 Slater de Brun; 25 Brailer Guerrero; 36 Angel Mateo; 40 Dean Moss; 7 Tom Poole; -- James Quinn-Irons	Manager: 6 Danny Mendick; Coaches: 37 Tyler Higgins (pitching); 3 Francisco Leandro (bench); 10 Kevin Randel (coach); 24 Paul Rozelle (hitting); 7-day injured list; * On Tampa Bay Rays 40-man roster; ~ Development list; # Rehab assignment; ∞ Reserve list; ‡ Restricted list; § Suspended list; † Temporarily inactive list; Roster updated November 1, 2026; Transactions; → More rosters: MiLB • Carolina League; → Tampa Bay Rays minor league players

=== Rookie ===
Florida Complex League Rays roster
Players		Coaches/Other
Pitchers: -- Colby Allen; -- Mason Bixby; -- Ben Blair; 86 Ismael Cabral; 30 Alonso Carrera; 92 Angel Castillo; -- McCarty English; -- Logan Georges; -- Gavin Giese; -- Steven Gonzalez; -- David Horn Jr.; -- Kyle Johnson; -- Owen Kramkowski; -- Haiden Leffew; -- Griffin Long; -- Tate McKee; 84 Gabriel Paez; 72 Moises Palma; 55 Rubender Pena; -- Amp Phillips; -- AJ Rice; 87 Starlin Savinon; -- Cole Stokes	Catchers: 86 Deinys Gonzalez; -- Alfredo Rodriguez; Infielders: 87 Israfell Bautista; 75 Emmanuel Cedeno; 81 Kleiver Chauran; -- Taj Marchand; -- Jose Monzon; -- Juanfel Peguero; 53 Aaron Pinero; Outfielders: -- Collin Bland; -- Tai Jones; 97 Carlos Matias; 79 Leonardo Pineda	Manager: 33 Sean Smedley; Coaches: 53 Manny Castillo (coach); -- Angel Galarraga (bullpen catcher); 50 K.C. Judge (hitting); 18 Ty Kelly (hitting); 77 Zac Law (bench); 13 Omar Luna (hitting); 27 Jim Morrison (coach); 26 Chris Roberson (coach); 60 Levi Romero (pitching); 55 Miguel Socolovich (pitching); -- Doc Watson (rehab pitching); 11 Julio Zorrilla (coach); 7-day injured list; * On Tampa Bay Rays 40-man roster; ~ Development list; # Rehab assignment; ∞ Reserve list; ‡ Restricted list; § Suspended list; † Temporarily inactive list; Roster updated November 2, 2026; Transactions; → More rosters: MiLB • Florida Complex League; → Tampa Bay Rays minor league players

=== Foreign Rookie ===
Dominican Summer League Tampa Bay roster
Players		Coaches/Other
Pitchers: 30 Anderson Alvarez; 44 Jhonny Aranguren; 32 Omar Arredondo; -- Luis Bautista ‡; 31 Diego Castro; 34 Jhendry Ciriaco; 35 Ransel Cruz; 36 Jensey Duran; 36 Ricardo Guzman; 38 Emmanuel Hernandez; 26 Denichel Javier; 40 Andrik Linarez; 38 Alexander Lopez; 39 Ezequiel Martinez; 28 Robinson Martinez; 33 Roberto Mendoza; 32 Jose Menes; 29 Yolvin Mesa; 26 Yonaiker Perez; 25 Sebastian Pina; 37 Raibel Reyes; 50 Ismael Sanchez	Catchers: 14 Bladimir Figueredo; 9 Santiago Mendoza; 2 Brainerh Palacios; 20 Ivan Torres; Infielders: 1 Eliomar Garces; 5 Raymer Medina; 3 Brayan Rodriguez; 4 Carlos Salazar; 15 Warel Solano; 7 Victor Valdez; Outfielders: 16 Maykol Coret; 18 Luis Perez; 7 Kadil Rubio	Manager: -- Albert Lantigua; Coaches: -- Yomelbin Almonte (assistant pitching); -- Eleardo Cabrera (hitting); -- Erick Epifano (bench); -- Jiminson Natera (hitting); -- Odalys Peguero (outfield); -- Luis Urena (pitching); 7-day injured list; * On Tampa Bay Rays 40-man roster; ~ Development list; # Rehab assignment; ∞ Reserve list; ‡ Restricted list; § Suspended list; † Temporarily inactive list; Roster updated September 6, 2026; Transactions; → More rosters: MiLB • Dominican Summer League; → Tampa Bay Rays minor league players

Dominican Summer League Rays roster
Players		Coaches/Other
Pitchers: -- Felipe Alcazar; 39 Andersson Barvosa; 30 Daiverson Blanco; -- Daniel Castro; 24 Arturo Coats; -- Yerpleider Dugarte; 43 Mauricio Flores; 41 Yohairo Matias; 50 Yosniel Menendez; 40 Diego Palacios; 35 Angel Perez; 41 Sebastian Perez; 22 Ricardo Ramirez; 45 Ralph Sierra; -- Diego Soriano; 23 Justin Suero; 28 Francis Valdez	Catchers: 5 Santiago Figueroa; 8 Samuel Pardo; 17 Gregory Rodriguez; Infielders: 8 Jeison Araujo; 4 Fabricio Blanco; 16 Franklin Merisu; 2 Lissandro Peralta; 6 Matias Palacio; 1 Erison Rojas; Outfielders: 13 Luis Almanzar; 11 Elvis Jean; 14 Jean Paredes; 23 Emile Torres	Manager: Henry Lugo; Coaches: Jumbo Díaz (assistant pitching); Wilmer Dominguez (bench); Leonardo Reginatto (hitting); Jose Sanchez (pitching); 7-day injured list; * On Tampa Bay Rays 40-man roster; ~ Development list; # Rehab assignment; ∞ Reserve list; ‡ Restricted list; § Suspended list; † Temporarily inactive list; Roster updated September 11, 2026; Transactions; → More rosters: MiLB • Dominican Summer League; → Tampa Bay Rays minor league players
