= List of Tampa Bay Rays first-round draft picks =

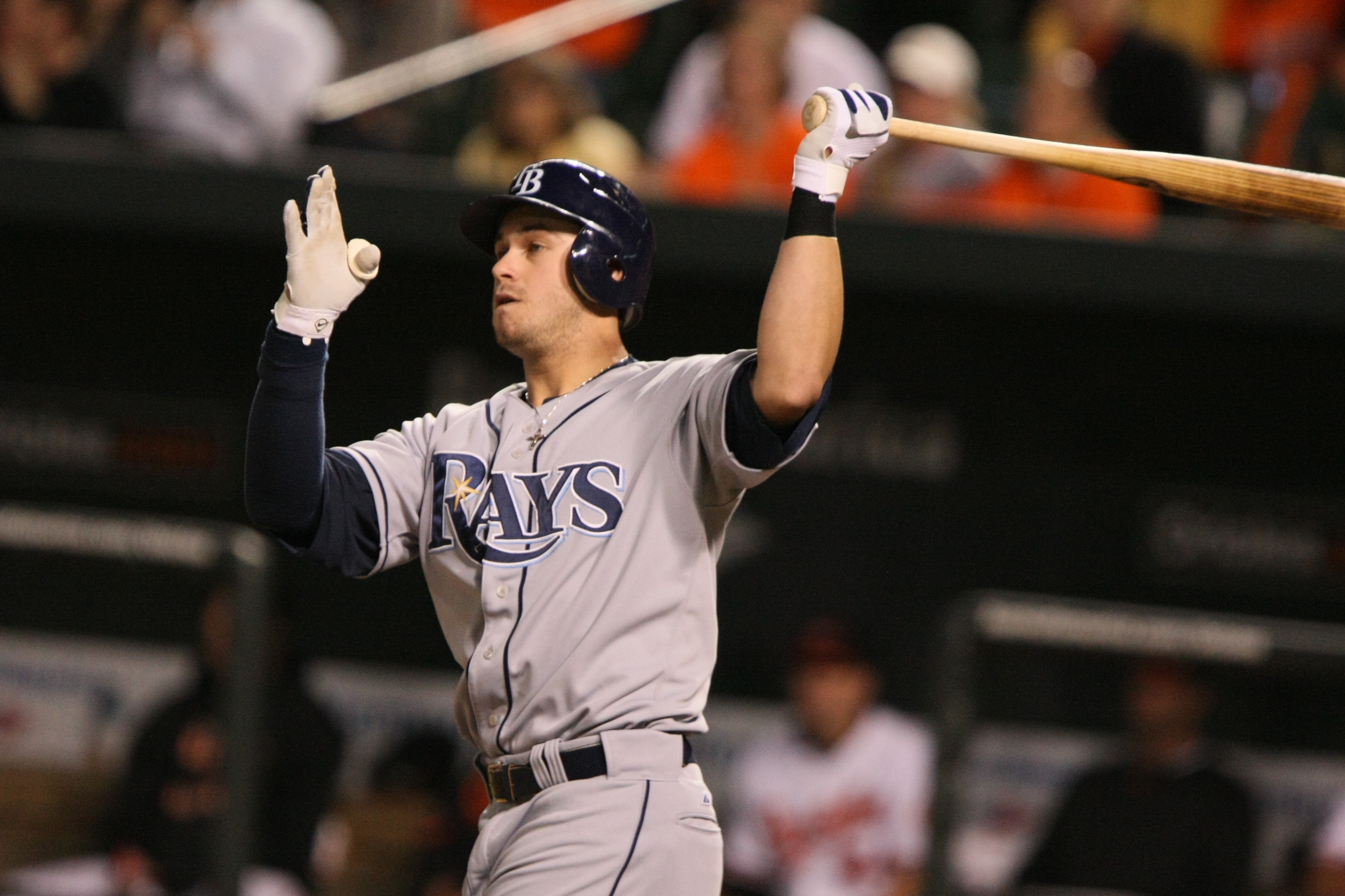
Evan Longoria (2008) is the only Rays' first-round pick to win a Rookie of the Year Award with the team.

The Tampa Bay Rays are a Major League Baseball franchise based in St. Petersburg, Florida. The Rays (formerly the Tampa Bay Devil Rays) compete in the American League East division. Since the franchise was established in 1995, the Rays have selected 36 players in the first round. Officially known as the "First-Year Player Draft", the Rule 4 Draft is Major League Baseball's primary mechanism for assigning amateur baseball players from high schools, colleges, and other amateur baseball clubs to its teams. The draft order is determined based on the previous season's standings, with the team possessing the worst record receiving the first pick. In addition, teams which lost free agents in the previous off-season may be awarded compensatory or supplementary picks. The First-Year Player Draft is unrelated to the 1997 expansion draft in which the Rays filled their roster.

Of the 36 players the Rays have selected in the first round, 10 have been outfielders and 12 have been drafted exclusively as pitchers. Of the 12 pitchers, eight were right-handed and four were left-handed. The Rays have also drafted five shortstops, four third basemen, two catchers, one second baseman, and one first baseman. In addition to these, one player (2017 pick Brendan McKay) was drafted as both a left-handed pitcher and a first baseman. (Note: Although McKay was officially listed on the draft board as exclusively a first baseman, the Rays announced they would develop him as a two-way player.) Twenty players were drafted out of high school, 12 were drafted out of four-year colleges, and one was drafted from a junior college. Two players were drafted from Rice University in Houston, Texas in consecutive years.

None of the Rays' first-round picks have won a World Series championship with the team, and no pick has been named the Most Valuable Player. Evan Longoria (2006) won the Rookie of the Year Award in 2008, the only Rays player to do so. The Rays have made the first selection in the draft four times, drafting Josh Hamilton (1999), Delmon Young (2003), David Price (2007), and Tim Beckham (2008).

The Rays have made nine selections in the supplemental round of the draft since their establishment in 1995. These additional picks are provided when a team loses a particularly valuable free agent in the previous off-season,^{[V]} or, more recently, if a team fails to sign a draft pick from the previous year. The Rays have failed to sign one of their first-round picks, LeVon Washington (2009), a client of Scott Boras who could not come to an agreed contract with the team. The Rays received the 31st pick in 2010 as compensation.

== Key ==
Year	Each year links to an article about that year's Major League Baseball draft.
Position	Indicates the secondary/collegiate position at which the player was drafted, rather than the professional position the player may have gone on to play
Pick	Indicates the number of the pick within the first round
*	Player did not sign with the Rays
§	Indicates a supplemental pick

== Picks ==
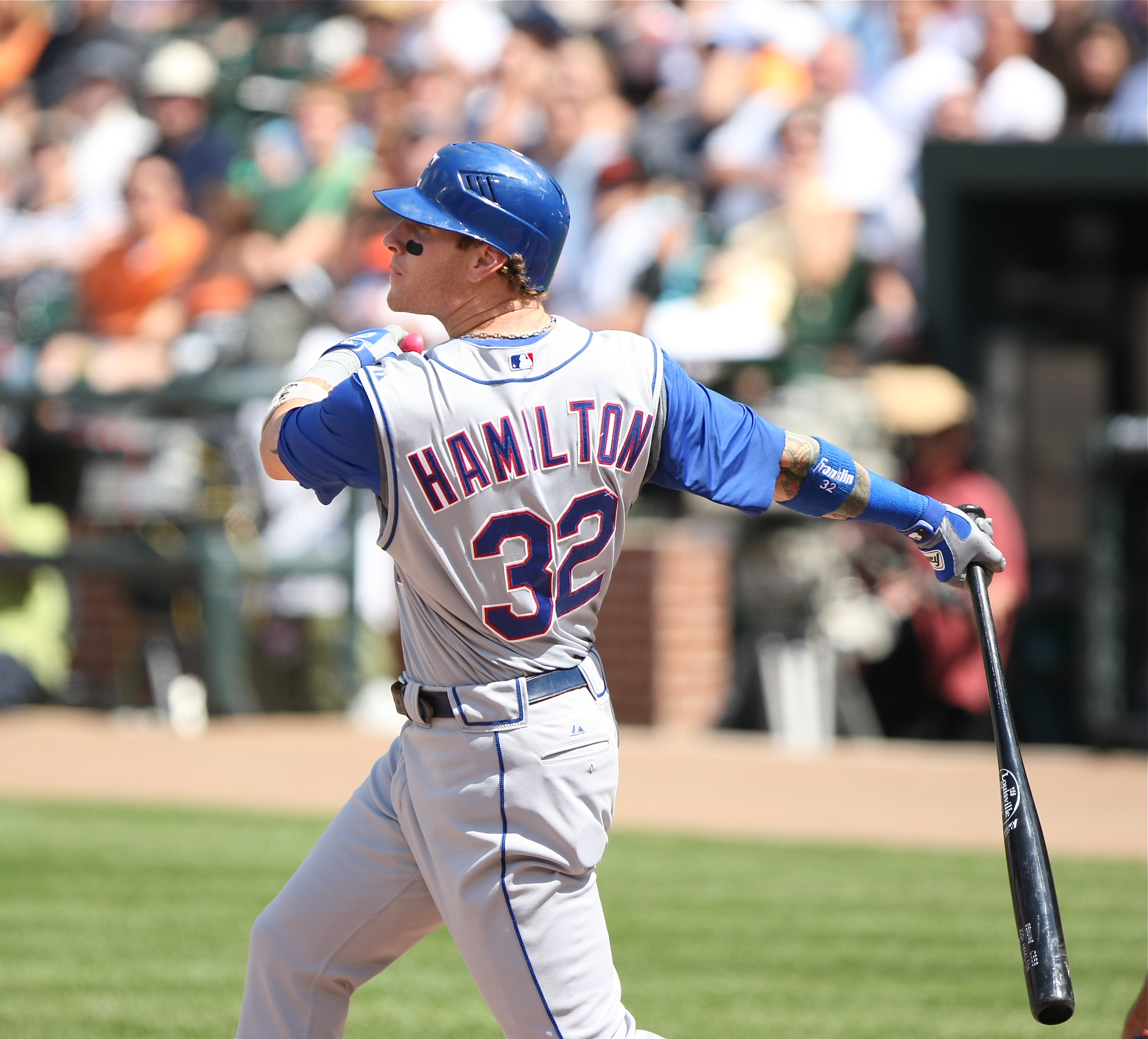
Josh Hamilton (1999) was the first of the Rays' first overall selections in the draft.

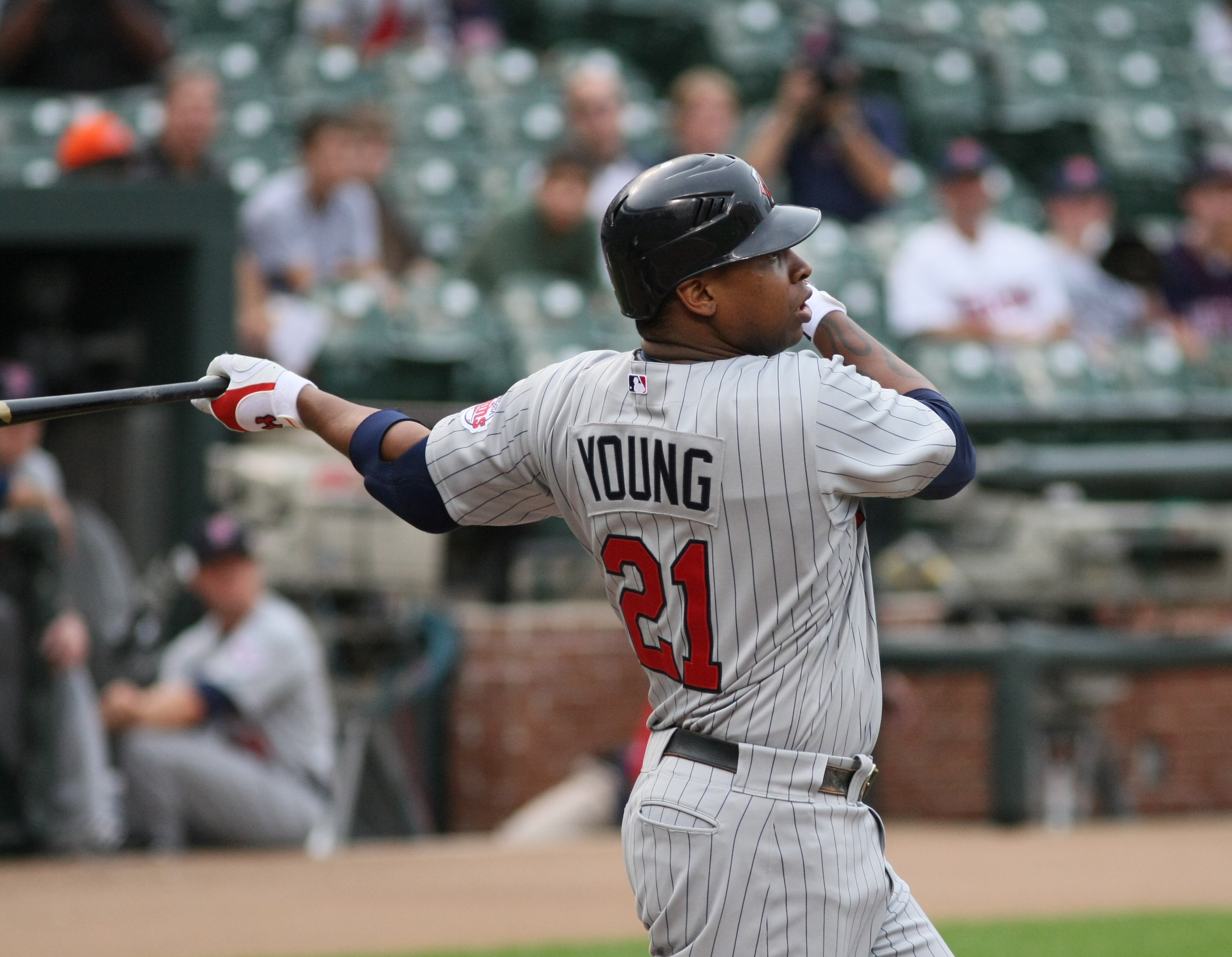
Delmon Young (2003) was one of six outfielders selected by the Rays in the first round.

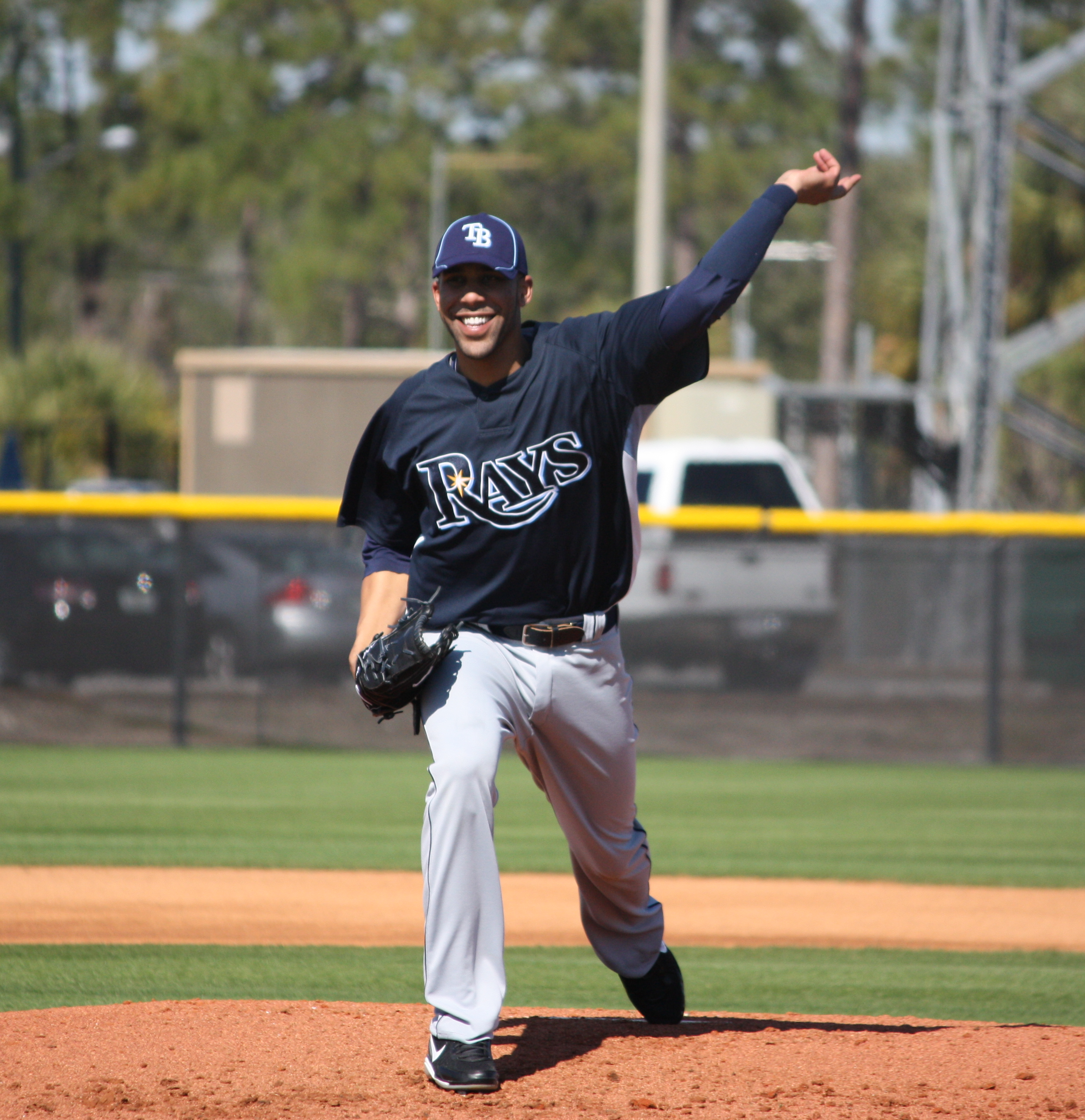
David Price (2007) was the third of the Rays' first overall selections in the draft.

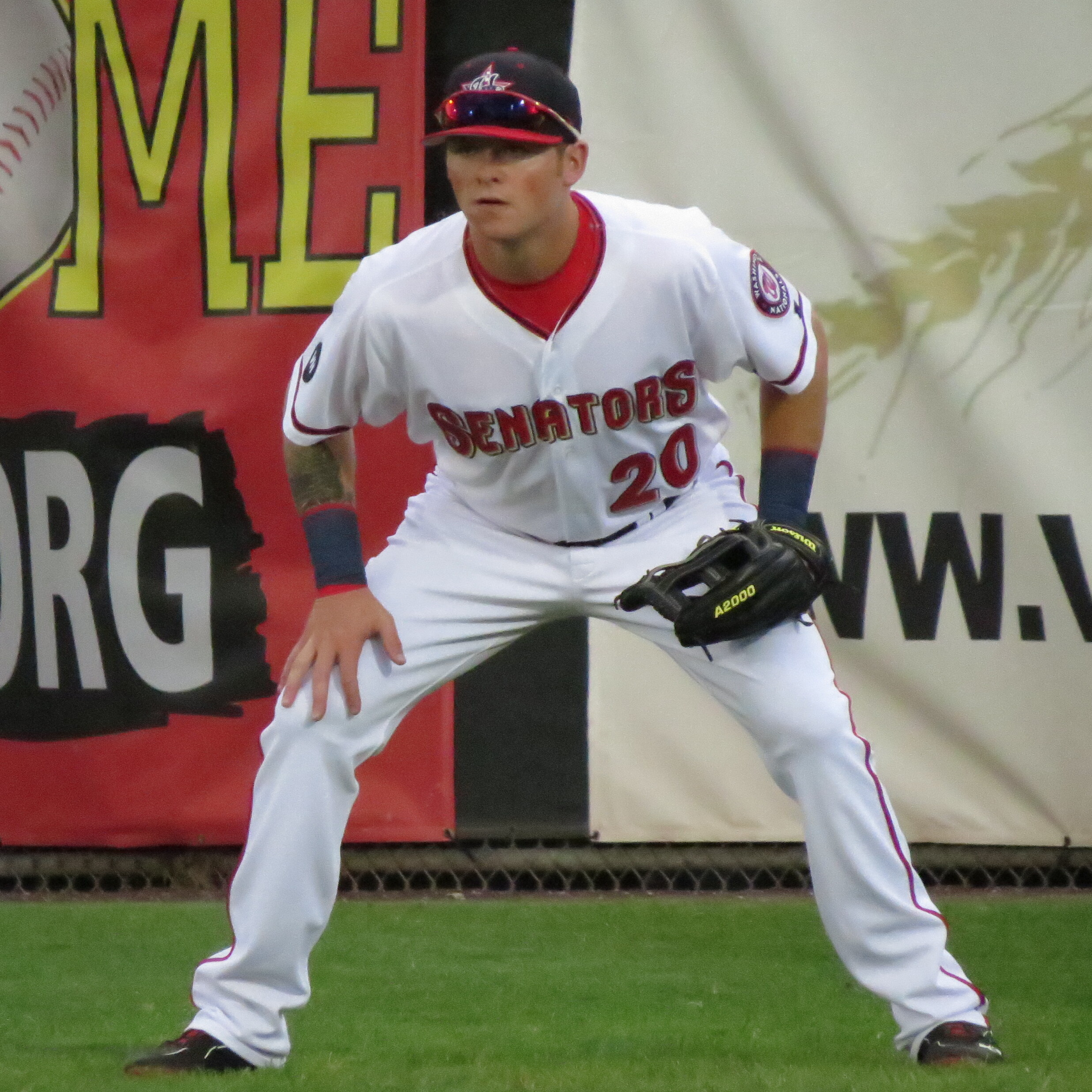
Drew Vettleson (2010) did not reach the major leagues.

Year	Name	Position	School (Location)	Pick	Ref
1996	Paul Wilder	Outfielder	Cary High School (Cary, North Carolina)	29	
1997	Jason Standridge	Right-handed pitcher	Hewitt-Trussville High School (Trussville, Alabama)	31	
1998	no first-round pick^{[a]}				
1999	Josh Hamilton	Outfielder	Athens Drive High School (Raleigh, North Carolina)	1	
2000	Rocco Baldelli	Outfielder	Bishop Hendricken High School (Warwick, Rhode Island)	6	
2001	Dewon Brazelton	Right-handed pitcher	Middle Tennessee State University (Murfreesboro, Tennessee)	3	
2002	B.J. Upton^{[b]}	Shortstop	Greenbrier Christian Academy (Chesapeake, Virginia)	2	
2003	Delmon Young	Outfielder	Adolfo Camarillo High School (Camarillo, California)	1	
2004	Jeff Niemann	Right-handed pitcher	Rice University (Houston, Texas)	4	
2005	Wade Townsend	Right-handed pitcher	Rice University (Houston, Texas)	8	
2006	Evan Longoria	Third baseman	California State University, Long Beach (Long Beach, California)	3	
2007	David Price	Left-handed pitcher	Vanderbilt University (Nashville, Tennessee)	1	
2008	Tim Beckham	Shortstop	Griffin High School (Griffin, Georgia)	1	
2009	LeVon Washington*	Second baseman	Buchholz High School (Gainesville, Florida)	30	
2010	Josh Sale	Outfielder	Bishop Blanchet High School (Seattle, Washington)	17	
2010	Justin O'Conner	Catcher	Cowan High School (Cowan, Indiana)	31^{§}^{[c]}	
2010	Drew Vettleson	Outfielder	Central Kitsap High School (Silverdale, Washington)	42^{§}^{[d]}	
2011	Taylor Guerrieri	Right-handed pitcher	Spring Valley High School (Columbia, South Carolina)	24^{[e]}	
2011	Mikie Mahtook	Outfielder	Louisiana State University (Baton Rouge, Louisiana)	31^{[f]}	
2011	Jake Hager	Shortstop	Sierra Vista High School (Spring Valley, Nevada)	32	
2011	Brandon Martin	Shortstop	Santiago High School (Garden Grove, California)	38^{§}^{[g]}	
2011	Tyler Goeddel	Third baseman	St. Francis High School (Mountain View, California)	41^{§}^{[h]}	
2011	Jeff Ames	Right-handed pitcher	Lower Columbia College (Longview, Washington)	42^{§}^{[i]}	
2011	Blake Snell	Left-handed pitcher	Shorewood High School (Shoreline, Washington)	52^{§}^{[j]}	
2011	Kes Carter	Outfielder	Western Kentucky University (Bowling Green, Kentucky)	56^{§}^{[k]}	
2011	Grayson Garvin	Left-handed pitcher	Vanderbilt University (Nashville, Tennessee)	59^{§}^{[l]}	
2011	James Harris	Outfielder	Oakland Technical High School (Oakland, California)	60^{§}^{[m]}	
2012	Richie Shaffer	Third baseman	Clemson University (Clemson, South Carolina)	25	
2013	Nick Ciuffo	Catcher	Lexington High School (Lexington, South Carolina)	21	
2013	Ryne Stanek	Right-handed pitcher	University of Arkansas (Fayetteville, Arkansas)	29^{§}^{[n]}	
2014	Casey Gillaspie	First baseman	Wichita State University (Wichita, Kansas)	20	
2015	Garrett Whitley	Outfielder	Niskayuna High School (Niskayuna, New York)	13	
2016	Josh Lowe	Third baseman	Pope High School (East Cobb, Georgia)	13	
2017	Brendan McKay	First baseman / Left-handed pitcher	University of Louisville (Louisville, Kentucky)	4	
2018	Matthew Liberatore	Left-handed pitcher	Mountain Ridge High School (Glendale, Arizona)	16	
2019	Greg Jones	Shortstop	University of North Carolina Wilmington (Wilmington, North Carolina)	22	
2020	Nick Bitsko	Right-handed pitcher	Central Bucks High School East (Buckingham, Pennsylvania)	24	
2021	Carson Williams	Shortstop	Torrey Pines High School (San Diego, California)	28	
2021	Cooper Kinney	Second baseman	Baylor School (Chattanooga, Tennessee)	34^{§}^{[n]}	
2022	Xavier Isaac	First baseman	East Forsyth High School (Kernersville, North Carolina)	29	
2023	Brayden Taylor	Shortstop	TCU (Fort Worth, Texas)	19	
2023	Adrian Santana	Shortstop	Doral Academy Preparatory School (Doral, Florida)	31^{§}^{[n]}	
2024	Theo Gillen	Outfielder	Westlake High School (Austin, Texas)	18	
2025	Daniel Pierce	Shortstop	Mill Creek High School (Hoschton, Georgia)	14	
2025	Brendan Summerhill	Outfielder	University of Arizona (Tucson, Arizona)	42^{§}^{[n]}	
2026	Grady Emerson	Shortstop	Argyle High School (Argyle, Texas)	2	
2026	Taj Marchand	Shortstop	James Island High School (Charleston, South Carolina)	33^{§}^{[n]}	

== See also ==
- Tampa Bay Rays minor league players

== Footnotes ==
- ^{V} Through the 2012 draft, free agents were evaluated by the Elias Sports Bureau and rated "Type A", "Type B", or not compensation-eligible. If a team offered arbitration to a player but that player refused and subsequently signed with another team, the original team was able to receive additional draft picks. If a "Type A" free agent left in this way, his previous team received a supplemental pick and a compensatory pick from the team with which he signed. If a "Type B" free agent left in this way, his previous team received only a supplemental pick. Since the 2013 draft, free agents are no longer classified by type; instead, compensatory picks are only awarded if the team offered its free agent a contract worth at least the average of the 125 current richest MLB contracts. However, if the free agent's last team acquired the player in a trade during the last year of his contract, it is ineligible to receive compensatory picks for that player.
- ^{a} The Rays lost their first-round pick in 1998 to the San Francisco Giants as compensation for signing free agent Roberto Hernández.
- ^{b} Now known by his birth name of Melvin Upton Jr.
- ^{c} The Rays gained a compensatory first-round pick in 2010 as compensation for not signing first-round draft pick LeVon Washington.
- ^{d} The Rays gained a supplemental first-round pick in 2010 as for losing free agent Gregg Zaun.
- ^{e} The Rays gained a compensatory first-round pick in 2011 from the Boston Red Sox for losing free agent Carl Crawford.
- ^{f} The Rays gained a compensatory first-round pick in 2011 from the New York Yankees for losing free agent Rafael Soriano.
- ^{g} The Rays gained a supplemental first-round pick in 2010 for losing free agent Rafael Soriano.
- ^{h} The Rays gained a supplemental first-round pick in 2010 for losing free agent Carl Crawford.
- ^{i} The Rays gained a supplemental first-round pick in 2010 for losing free agent Grant Balfour
- ^{j} The Rays gained a supplemental first-round pick in 2010 for losing free agent Brad Hawpe.
- ^{k} The Rays gained a supplemental first-round pick in 2010 for losing free agent Joaquín Benoit.
- ^{l} The Rays gained a supplemental first-round pick in 2010 for losing free agent Randy Choate.
- ^{m} The Rays gained a supplemental first-round pick in 2010 for losing free agent Chad Qualls.
- ^{n} The Rays gained a compensatory first-round pick in 2013 for losing free agent B. J. Upton, now known as Melvin Upton Jr.
