= Montgomery Biscuits =

- Founded in 1973 in Orlando, Florida; Based in Montgomery, Alabama since 2004
Team logo
Cap insignia

Minor league affiliations
- Class: Double-A (1973–present)
- League: Southern League (1973–present)
- Division: South Division

Major league affiliations
- Team: Tampa Bay Rays (1999–present)
- Previous teams: Seattle Mariners (1998); Chicago Cubs (1993–1997); Minnesota Twins (1973–1992)

Minor league titles
- League titles (5): 1981; 1991; 1999; 2006; 2007
- Division titles (10): 1975; 1976; 1981; 1990; 1991; 1999; 2006; 2007; 2024; 2025
- First-half titles (6): 1978; 1981; 1989; 1990; 2019; 2024
- Second-half titles (14): 1976; 1991; 1999; 2006; 2007; 2012; 2015; 2016; 2018; 2019; 2022; 2023; 2024; 2025

Team data
- Name: Montgomery Biscuits (2004–present)
- Previous names: Orlando Rays (1997–2003); Orlando Cubs (1993–1996); Orlando SunRays (1990–1992); Orlando Twins (1973–1989)
- Colors: Light navy, burnt orange, gold, white, pale yellow
- Mascot: Big Mo
- Ballpark: Dabos Park (2004–present)
- Previous parks: Champion Stadium (2000–2003); Tinker Field (1973–1999)
- Owner/ Operator: OnDeck Partners
- General manager: Michael Murphy
- Manager: Kevin Boles
- Media: MiLB.TV and WSFA, WMSP 740 AM
- Website: milb.com/montgomery

The Montgomery Biscuits are a Minor League Baseball team based in Montgomery, Alabama. They are the Double-A affiliate of the Tampa Bay Rays and play in the Southern League. The team was founded in Orlando, Florida, in 1973 as the Orlando Twins, an affiliate of the Minnesota Twins. After remaining in the Minnesota minor league organization for 20 seasons, the team became an affiliate of the Chicago Cubs for four seasons and then the Seattle Mariners for one. In 1999, the team became an affiliate of the Tampa Bay Rays, and they have remained in the organization ever since. They became members of the Double-A South in 2021, though this was renamed the Southern League in 2022.

Over the years, the club changed names several times. They were the Orlando Twins for 17 seasons, then were known as the SunRays, Cubs, and Rays. The club became known as the Biscuits when it moved from the Orlando area to Montgomery in 2004.

The club played at Tinker Field near downtown Orlando from 1973 until 2000, when they moved to Champion Stadium in nearby Lake Buena Vista, Florida. Since moving to Montgomery in 2004, the Biscuits have played at Dabos Park, a 7,000-seat facility which was built for the club in the downtown area.

== Franchise history ==
=== Orlando ===
The franchise joined the Southern League in 1973 as the Orlando Twins, a minor-league affiliate of the Minnesota Twins, which held spring training in Orlando, Florida at the time. The Orlando Twins played at Tinker Field in downtown Orlando, near the Florida Citrus Bowl Stadium. In 1990, the team was renamed the Orlando Sun Rays. In 1993, the Chicago Cubs became the team's new major-league affiliate, and the team was renamed the Orlando Cubs. While still a Chicago Cubs affiliate, the team renamed itself again in 1997 and became the Orlando Rays. The following year, for one season only, the Seattle Mariners were the Rays' major-league affiliate. The Tampa Bay Devil Rays, an American League expansion team in 1998, assumed the Orlando Rays' major-league affiliation the following year.

The Orlando Rays' last season at Tinker Field was 1999. From 2000 to 2003, the Orlando Rays played in Lake Buena Vista, Florida, in Champion Stadium at Walt Disney World Resort. Despite the fact that the team played in a state-of-the-art stadium that was built in 1997 and used during spring training by the Atlanta Braves, attendance did not meet expectations; after trailing the Southern League in attendance in multiple years, the Rays' owners announced the team would move to Montgomery in 2004 (terminating their 10-year lease with Disney after four seasons).

While in Orlando, the franchise won three Southern League championships: in 1981 (as the Twins), 1991 (as the Sun Rays), and 1999 (as the Rays).

=== Montgomery ===
The Biscuits became Montgomery's first Major League Baseball-affiliated team since 1980, when the Montgomery Rebels, a Detroit Tigers affiliate, played their final season in the Southern League at Montgomery's Paterson Field. The Biscuits' owners, Sherrie Myers and Tom Dickson, were selected from six different ownership groups during an extensive search for a public-private partner by the City of Montgomery. Myers and Dickson selected the team's nickname from over 4,000 entries in a "name the team" contest, due in part to tying into indigenous affiliation and potential marketing and pun possibilities (for example, "Hey, Butter, Butter, Butter" or the team's souvenir store, the "Biscuit Basket"). Several successful minor league teams have campy, quirky names to relate to families and kids. During games, biscuits are shot from an air cannon, into the stands. The official team colors are Butter and Blue.

On September 15, 2006, in just their third year of existence, the Biscuits defeated the Huntsville Stars to win the team's first Southern League championship in Montgomery. One year later, in 2007, the Biscuits again defeated the Huntsville Stars to win their second consecutive Southern League championship. They became the first team since the 1975 to 1977 Montgomery Rebels to win back-to-back championships.

The Biscuits were sold to a group of investors led by Richmond Flying Squirrels owner Lou DiBella in a transaction that closed on April 27, 2017.

In conjunction with Major League Baseball's restructuring of Minor League Baseball in 2021, the Biscuits were organized into the Double-A South. Though finishing the 2021 season in second place in the Southern Division at 62–55, the two teams with the highest winning percentages in the regular season competed in a best-of-five series to determine the league champion. With the circuit's second-best record, the Biscuits faced the Mississippi Braves in the best-of-five series but lost the championship, 3–2. Jonathan Aranda won the league Most Valuable Player Award. In 2022, the Double-A South became known as the Southern League, the name historically used by the regional circuit prior to the 2021 reorganization.

The Montgomery Biscuits took on the alternate identity of the “Alabama Peanut Runners” for two games on August 28 and August 31, 2025, as a tribute to Dr. George Washington Carver and his pioneering work with peanuts.

In December 2025, Lou DiBella sold the team to OnDeck Partners, a sports ownership group that is a part of Avenue Sports Fund.

== Mascot ==
Their mascots are "Big Mo", an orange beast that loves biscuits, and "Monty", an anthropomorphized buttermilk biscuit. Monty appears in the logo and on the hat. The mascot for the Orlando Rays was "Spike", a bear. The origin of Spike is unknown but presumed to predate the Devil Rays, as the club has been controlled by the Cubs and by the Twins (who have a bear mascot, T.C. Bear).

In 2014, a new live mascot was introduced and also named with a contest in which 4,800 entries submitted ideas for a micro-mini pot belly pig which became Miss Gravy, Duchess of Pork. Miss Gravy "retired to a farm in Wetumpka" in 2016.

== Notable alumni ==
Major League Baseball players who played for the Biscuits (or earlier incarnations) include:

- Dewon Brazelton
- Jorge Cantu
- Carl Crawford
- Matt Diaz
- Joey Gathright
- Chad Gaudin
- Jonny Gomes
- Toby Hall
- Jason Hammel
- Scott Kazmir
- Kevin Kiermaier
- Evan Longoria
- Seth McClung
- Fernando Perez
- David Price
- Shawn Riggans
- Kenny Rosenberg (born 1995)
- Juan Salas
- James Shields
- Blake Snell
- Andy Sonnanstine
- Cal Stevenson (born 1996)
- B. J. Upton
- Delmon Young
- Stephen Vogt
- Mikie Mahtook
- Taylor Motter
- Carson Williams

== Roster ==
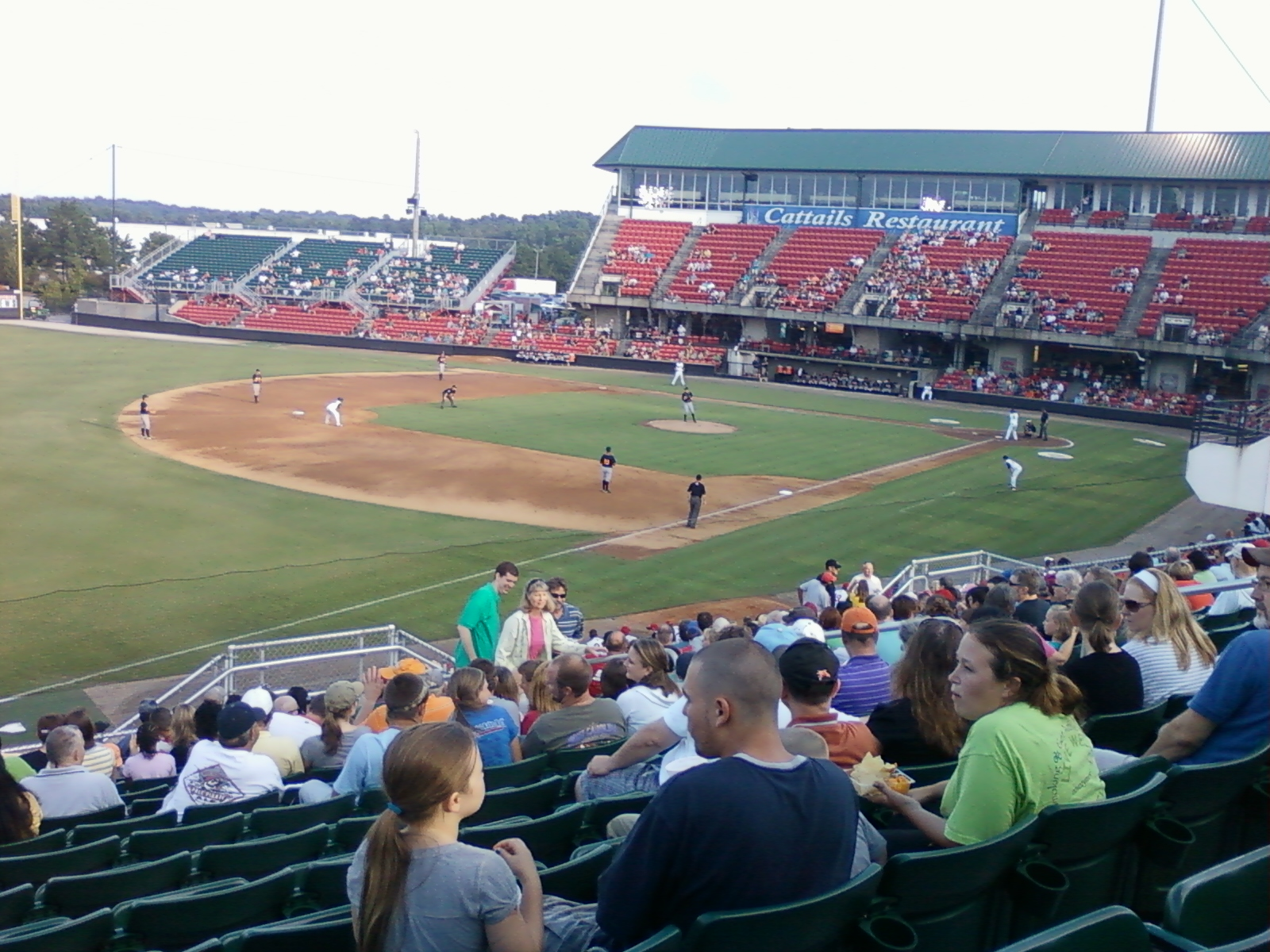
The Biscuits (in navy) on the road at Five County Stadium during a 2011 game against the Carolina Mudcats

Montgomery Biscuits roster
Players	Coaches/Other
Pitchers: 24 Jackson Baumeister; 19 Jonny Cuevas; 25 Garrett Edwards; 12 T.J. Fondtain; 29 Roel Garcia III; 31 Luis Guerrero; 30 K. C. Hunt; 39 Marcus Johnson; 37 Andrew Lindsey; 44 Tommy McCollum; 17 TJ Nichols; 21 Hayden Snelsire; 34 Santiago Suarez; 14 Junior William; 35 Justin Yeager; Catchers: 5 Bryan Broecker; 15 Daniel Vellojin; Infielders: 14 J.T. Arruda; 1 Gregory Barrios; 8 Cooper Kinney; 16 Mac Horvath; 3 Kamren James; 10 Will Simpson; 9 Ryan Spikes; Outfielders: 4 Theo Gillen; 6 Connor Hujsak; 7 Brock Jones; 33 Justyn-Henry Malloy; 6 Austin Overn	Manager: 22 Kevin Boles; Coaches: 27 Esteban Gonzalez (coach); 26 Braxton Martinez (hitting); 20 Jim Paduch (pitching); 2 Ronnie Richardson (bench); 60-day injured list: 35 Drew Dowd (full season); 38 Derrick Edington; 32 Jack Hartman (full season); -- Jacob Watters; 88 Alfredo Zarraga (full season); 7-day injured list; * On Tampa Bay Rays 40-man roster; ~ Development list; # Rehab assignment; ∞ Reserve list; ‡ Restricted list; § Suspended list; † Temporarily inactive list; Roster updated September 9, 2026; Transactions; → More rosters: MiLB • Southern League; → Tampa Bay Rays minor league players

== Television and radio ==
All Montgomery Biscuits games are televised live on MiLB.TV and select games are also televised live on WSFA. WMSP 740 AM provides radio broadcasts of games. Since 2016, the Biscuits play-by-play commentator is Chris Adams-Wall.
