= Shane Baz =

American baseball player (born 1999)

Baltimore Orioles – No. 34
- Pitcher
- Born: June 17, 1999 (age 27); Cypress, Texas, U.S.
- Bats: Right Throws: Right

MLB debut
- September 20, 2021, for the Tampa Bay Rays

MLB statistics (through 2026 season)
- Win–loss record: 23–32
- Earned run average: 4.19
- Strikeouts: 447
- Stats at Baseball Reference

Teams
- Tampa Bay Rays (2021–2022, 2024–2025); Baltimore Orioles (2026–present)
Medals
Men's baseball
Representing United States
Olympic Games
Silver medal – second place	2020 Tokyo	Team

Shane Austin Baz (/bɑːz/ BAHZ; born June 17, 1999) is an American professional baseball pitcher for the Baltimore Orioles of Major League Baseball (MLB). He has previously played in MLB for the Tampa Bay Rays.

== Early life ==
Baz was born to Lebanese father Raja and American mother Tammy. His father was born in Beirut, Lebanon, and played soccer in his native country before moving to the United States at the age of 15.

== Amateur career ==
Baz attended Concordia Lutheran High School in Tomball, Texas. As a junior, he had a 1.06 earned run average (ERA) with 46 strikeouts over 23 innings. Baz was a member of the United States national team in 2016. Baz committed to Texas Christian University (TCU) to play college baseball. Considered one of the top prospects for the 2017 Major League Baseball draft, the Pittsburgh Pirates selected him with the 12th overall pick. He officially signed with the Pirates a few days after the draft.

== Professional career ==
=== Pittsburgh Pirates ===
Baz spent 2017 with the Gulf Coast League Pirates, posting an 0–3 record with a 3.80 ERA in 23 2/3 innings pitched. MLB.com ranked Baz as Pittsburgh's third best prospect going into the 2018 season. He pitched for the Bristol Pirates of the Rookie-level Appalachian League.

=== Tampa Bay Rays ===
On August 14, 2018, Baz was acquired by the Tampa Bay Rays as a player to be named later from an earlier trade in which the Pirates also sent Tyler Glasnow and Austin Meadows to the Rays for Chris Archer. The Rays assigned him to the Princeton Rays of the Appalachian League. Over 12 starts between Bristol and Princeton, Baz went 4–5 with a 4.47 ERA and a 1.62 WHIP. Baz began the 2019 season in extended spring training before reporting to the Bowling Green Hot Rods in early May. Over 17 starts with Bowling Green, Baz went 3–2 with a 2.99 ERA, striking out 87 batters over 81 1/3 innings. He was selected to play in the Arizona Fall League for the Salt River Rafters following the season.

Baz did not play in a game in 2020 due to the cancellation of the minor league season because of the COVID-19 pandemic. In June 2021, Baz was selected to play in the All-Star Futures Game.

Baz was promoted to the major leagues on September 20, 2021, to make his debut that same night at Tropicana Field. He started against the Toronto Blue Jays and threw five innings in which he gave up two earned runs on two hits (both were home runs) while striking out five. Baz made three starts for Tampa Bay during his rookie campaign, registering a 2-0 record and 2.03 ERA with 18 strikeouts across 13 1/3 innings pitched. He made his post-season starting debut in the second game of the American League Division Series against the Boston Red Sox on October 8, 2021.

On April 16, 2022, Baz was placed on the 60-day injured list as he continued his recovery from arthroscopic elbow surgery, which he underwent in late March. He was activated on June 11. Baz made six starts for the Rays, posting a 1–2 record and 5.00 ERA with 30 strikeouts over 27 innings pitched. He was placed back on the injured list on July 14 with a right elbow strain, and was transferred to the 60-day injured list on July 16 after receiving a platelet-rich plasma injection. On September 28, Baz underwent Tommy John surgery, ending his season. Baz was forced to miss the entire 2023 season as well.

On May 23, 2024, Baz was reinstated from the injured list and optioned to the Triple-A Durham Bulls. He made 14 starts for the Rays during the year, compiling a 4–3 record and 3.06 ERA with 69 strikeouts across 79 1/3 innings pitched.

Baz made 31 starts for Tampa Bay during the 2025 season, registering a 10–12 record and 4.87 ERA with 176 strikeouts across 166 1/3 innings pitched.

=== Baltimore Orioles ===
On December 19, 2025, the Rays traded Baz to the Baltimore Orioles in exchange for prospects Caden Bodine, Slater de Brun, Austin Overn, Michael Forret, and a draft pick in the Competitive Balance Round A of the 2026 Major League Baseball draft. On March 27, 2026, Baz and the Orioles agreed to a five-year, $68 million contract extension, the largest contract given to a pitcher in franchise history.

== International career ==
On July 2, 2021, Baz was named to the roster for the United States national baseball team for the 2020 Summer Olympics, held in 2021 in Tokyo. Baz earned a 6.75 ERA over 2 2/3 innings pitched, in a single second-round start against Japan; he allowed five hits and three walks but only two earned runs. The U.S. team eventually lost 6–7 in extra innings. The team won the silver medal, losing to Japan in the gold-medal game.

== See also ==
- List of Olympic medalists in baseball
- List of people from Houston
