= Carson Williams (baseball) =

American baseball player (born 2003)

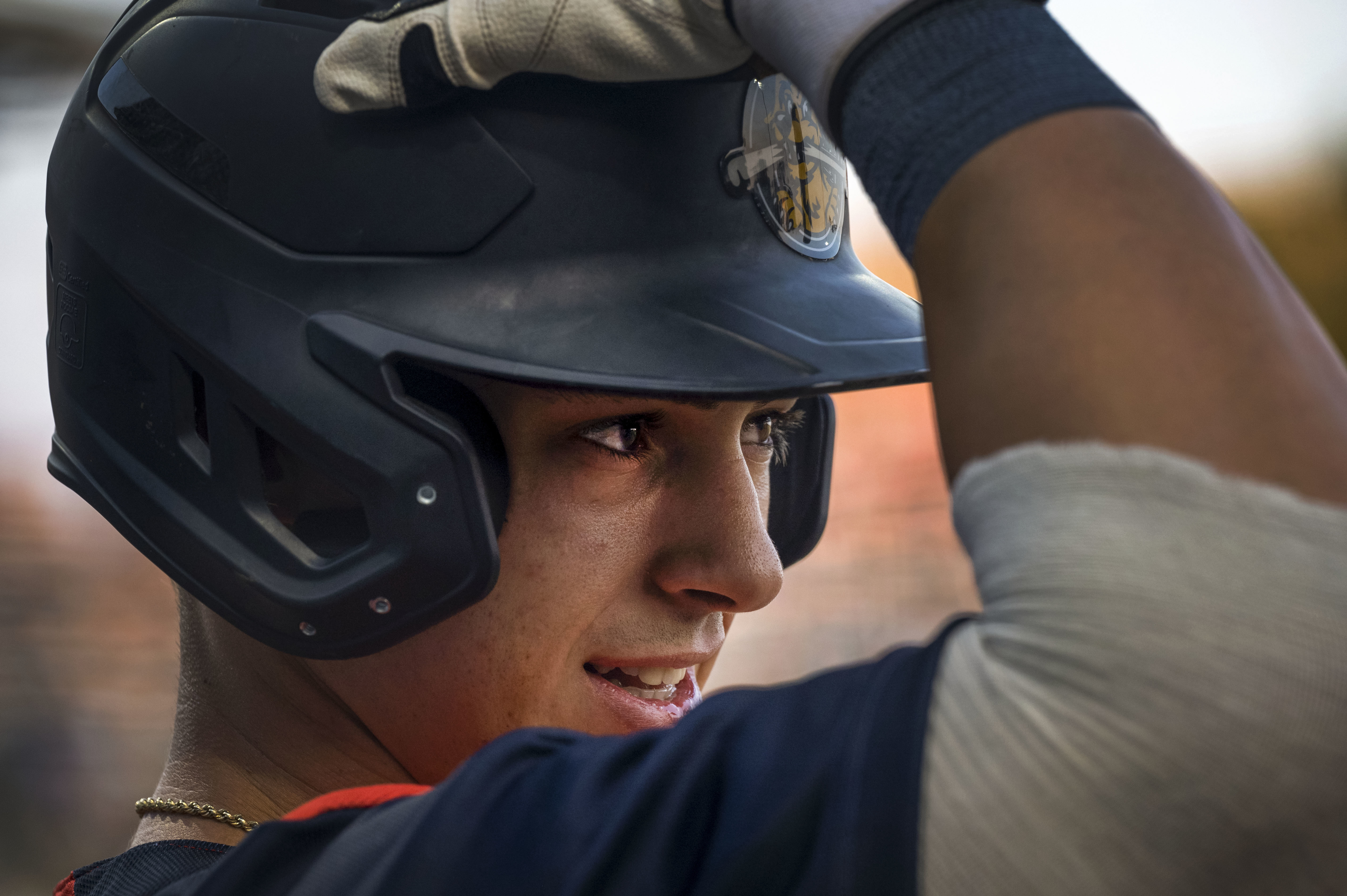
- Williams with the Charleston RiverDogs in 2022

Tampa Bay Rays – No. 7
- Shortstop
- Born: June 25, 2003 (age 23); San Diego, California, U.S.
- Bats: Right Throws: Right

MLB debut
- August 22, 2025, for the Tampa Bay Rays

MLB statistics (through 2026 season)
- Batting average: .154
- Home runs: 6
- Runs batted in: 18
- Stats at Baseball Reference

Teams
- Tampa Bay Rays (2025–present)
Medals
Men's baseball
Representing United States
WBSC Premier12
Bronze medal – third place	2024 Tokyo	Team

Carson Everett Williams (born June 25, 2003) is an American professional baseball shortstop for the Tampa Bay Rays of Major League Baseball (MLB). He was selected by the Rays in the first round of the 2021 MLB draft and made his MLB debut in 2025.

== Amateur career ==
Williams grew up in San Diego, California and attended Torrey Pines High School. As a senior, he batted .495 with 11 home runs and 34 stolen bases. Williams committed to played college baseball for the University of California, Berkeley.

== Professional career ==
Williams was selected 28th overall in the 2021 Major League Baseball draft by the Tampa Bay Rays. Williams signed with the Rays for a $2.35 million signing bonus.

Williams made his professional debut with the Rookie-level Florida Complex League Rays, slashing .282/.404/.436 with four doubles, eight RBI, 13 strikeouts and six walks over 39 at-bats. He opened the 2022 season with the Charleston RiverDogs of the Single-A Carolina League. In 113 appearances on the year, Williams slashed .252/.347/.471 with 19 home runs, 70 RBI, and 28 stolen bases. He was named the 2022 MiLB Gold Glove as the best defensive shortstop in the minor leagues.

Williams split the 2023 campaign between the High-A Bowling Green Hot Rods, Double-A Montgomery Biscuits, and Triple-A Durham Bulls. In 115 appearances for the three affiliates, he batted a cumulative .257/.356/.497 with 23 home runs, 81 RBI, and 20 stolen bases. Williams spent the 2024 season with Montgomery, playing in 115 games and batting .256/.352/.469 with 20 home runs, 69 RBI, and 33 stolen bases.

Williams began the 2025 season with Triple-A Durham, slashing .213/.318/.447 with 23 home runs, 55 RBI, and 22 stolen bases across 111 appearances. On August 21, 2025, Williams was promoted to the major leagues for the first time following an injury to Ha-seong Kim. During his debut game with the Rays the following day, Williams hit a home run off of Ryan Fernandez of the St. Louis Cardinals.

Williams was initially optioned to Triple-A Durham to begin the 2026 season. However, following an injury to Taylor Walls, Williams was named as the Rays' starting shortstop to begin the year.

== International career ==
Williams was named to the United States national baseball team for the 2024 WBSC Premier12. In 31 at-bats, Williams slashed .258/.419/.385 with eight hits, four RBIs, and a team-leading seven walks, as the United States took the bronze medal.
