= Zach Eflin =

American baseball player (born 1994)

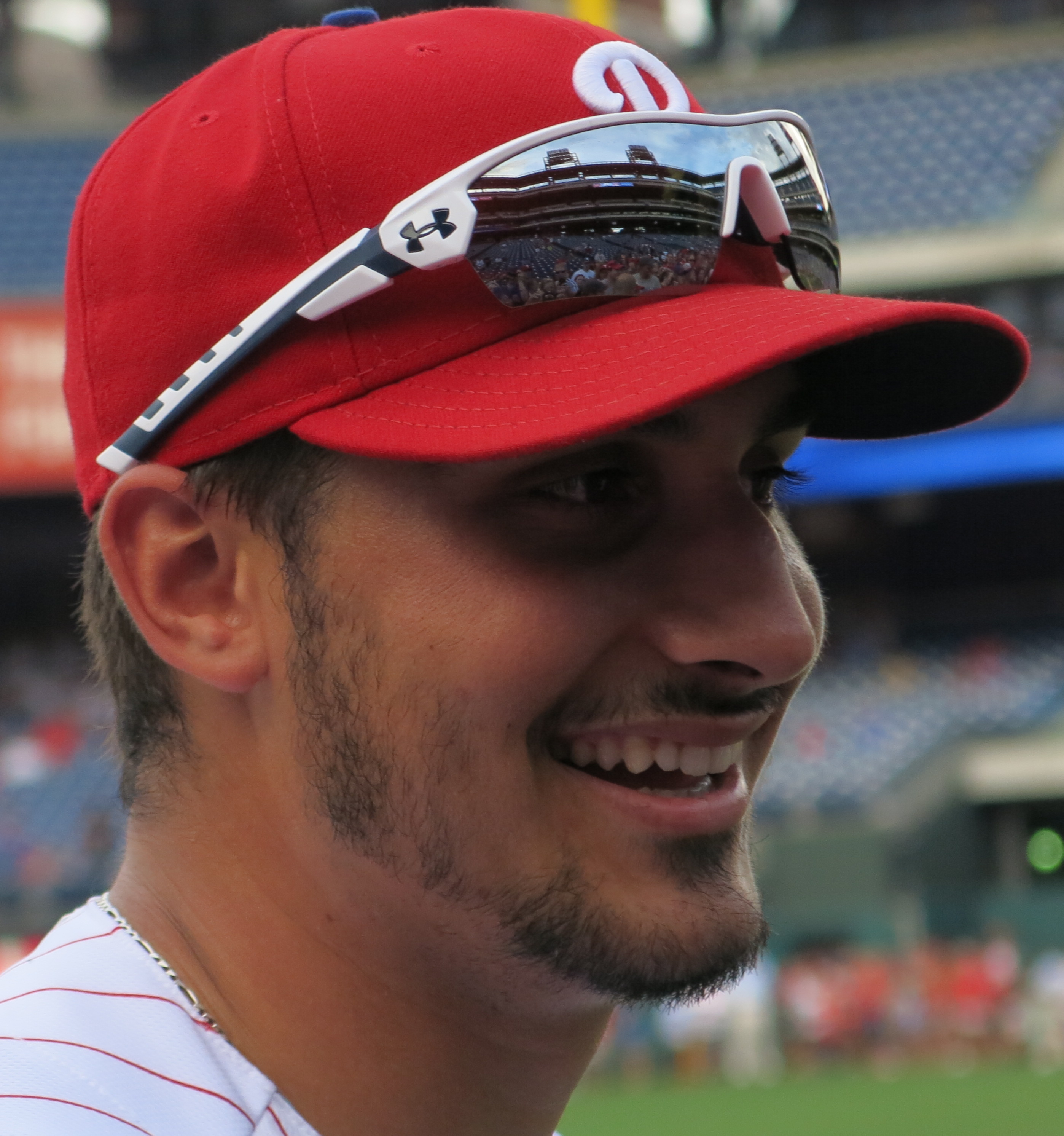
- Eflin with the Phillies in 2016

Free agent
- Pitcher
- Born: April 8, 1994 (age 32); Orlando, Florida, U.S.
- Bats: Right Throws: Right

MLB debut
- June 14, 2016, for the Philadelphia Phillies

MLB statistics (through 2026 season)
- Win–loss record: 68–67
- Earned run average: 4.28
- Strikeouts: 929
- Stats at Baseball Reference

Teams
- Philadelphia Phillies (2016–2022); Tampa Bay Rays (2023–2024); Baltimore Orioles (2024–2026)

Career highlights and awards
- AL wins leader (2023)
Medals
Men's baseball
Representing United States
Pan American Games
| Silver medal – second place | 2015 Toronto | Team |

Zachary Adams Eflin (born April 8, 1994) is an American professional baseball pitcher who is a free agent. He has previously played in Major League Baseball (MLB) for the Philadelphia Phillies, Tampa Bay Rays, and Baltimore Orioles.

The San Diego Padres selected Eflin in the first round (33rd overall) of the 2012 MLB draft, and he spent three seasons in the Padres' minor league system. In December 2014, Eflin was traded twice in the course of 24 hours, first to the Los Angeles Dodgers as part of a package for all-star outfielder Matt Kemp, and then to the Phillies as part of a package for franchise star Jimmy Rollins. Eflin made his MLB debut with the Phillies in 2016 and bounced between the major league and minor league levels for several seasons. Beginning in 2019, he landed in the major leagues and became an anchor of the Phillies' starting rotation in 2019–21 seasons, but a right knee contusion resulted in a stint on the 60-day injured list, and Eflin was moved to the bullpen after his return in September 2022. He signed with the Rays as a free agent after the 2022 season.

Eflin relies heavily on a sinking fastball that he pairs with a slider and curveball. Although he has experimented with being a power pitcher, he relies more on his command and pitching to contact. He is a Christian and credits his faith as having helped him through a challenging upbringing that included several family tragedies.

== Early life ==
Eflin was born in Orlando, Florida. Eflin's older sister Ashley died of leukemia at age seven. Another sister, Candace, Eflin has said, is his greatest inspiration. Candace has had special needs since birth (global developmental delay) due to oxygen deprivation. His eldest sister, Brittany, is a registered nurse. Growing up, Eflin says he leaned heavily on his Christian faith; his paternal grandfather has been a pastor for 60 years.

Eflin attended Paul J. Hagerty High School in Oviedo, Florida, where he played baseball. His junior year of high school, Eflin planned to quit the baseball team to join the golf team, but he ultimately abandoned that plan. While he was in high school, he grew seven inches and became a dominant starting pitcher who attracted attention from colleges and professional scouts. In his senior year, he had an 0.51 earned run average (ERA) and 59 strikeouts in 43 innings pitched. Although Eflin signed a National Letter of Intent to attend UCF on a college baseball scholarship, he ultimately signed with the San Diego Padres after being drafted.

== Career ==
=== San Diego Padres ===
Following his high school career, the San Diego Padres selected Eflin in the first round, with the 33rd overall selection, of the 2012 MLB draft. Rather than enroll at UCF, Eflin signed with the Padres, receiving a $1.2 million signing bonus. Eflin began his professional career in 2012 with the AZL Padres in the Arizona Fall League, with a win–loss record of 0–1 and a 7.71 ERA in seven innings. He missed time after he contracted mononucleosis. After his first season, scouts thought that he had a good chance to have a strong career in the major leagues, but injury concerns had already begun to mount.

The next year, in his first full professional season, he pitched for the Fort Wayne TinCaps of the Single–A Midwest League. Eflin posted a 7–6 record and a league-leading 2.73 ERA. He recorded 86 strikeouts in 118 2/3 innings. After the season, baseball analyst Keith Law ranked Eflin the eighth-best prospect in the Padres' minor league system, noting he was at a more advanced stage of development as a pitcher than two of the higher-ranked pitching prospects but might have a slightly lower ceiling. In 2014, Eflin pitched for the Lake Elsinore Storm of the High–A California League, and he finished the season with a 10–7 win–loss record and a 3.80 ERA, with 93 strikeouts in 128 innings. After the season, he was ranked the number five prospect in the Padres' system, recognized by scouts for his "stellar control" who avoided issuing walks to opposing hitters.

=== Philadelphia Phillies ===
==== Prospect (2015–2017) ====
On December 18, 2014, the Padres traded Eflin, Joe Wieland, and Yasmani Grandal to the Los Angeles Dodgers in exchange for all-star outfielder Matt Kemp, Tim Federowicz, and cash. Less than 24 hours later, Eflin came to the Phillies with Tom Windle from the Los Angeles Dodgers in a trade that moved Jimmy Rollins, the longest-tenured athlete in all of Philadelphia sports, the Phillies' all-time hits leader, and the face of the franchise for more than a decade, to Los Angeles. The trade was the first move in what Phillies general manager Rubén Amaro Jr. characterized an "arduous rebuilding process", The Phillies had zeroed in on Eflin on the advice of Gorman Heimueller, a former Phillies instructor working in the Padres organization, who said that Eflin "had a lead-pipe sinker and the makings to pitch at the top of a rotation once he could master the slider." During spring training in 2021, Eflin—the last player acquired during Amaro's 2015 rebuilding efforts still to be in the Phillies organization—reflected on the trade as a turning point for his career, noting that the moment made it feel "like someone wanted me more."

After Baseball America named him the fourth-best prospect in the Phillies minor league system prior to the 2015 season, the Phillies invited Eflin to spring training as a non-roster player before assigning him to the Class AA Reading Fightin Phils. Eflin spent the 2015 season in the Eastern League as part of a starting rotation that included top Phillies prospects Aaron Nola, Jesse Biddle, Ben Lively, and Windle, the anticipated cornerstones of a new Phillies pitching staff. He finished the 2015 season with an 8–6 record with a 3.69 ERA and a 1.21 walks plus hits per inning pitched (tied for ninth in the league), with 68 strikeouts in 131 2/3 innings pitched. He was the April 12 Eastern League Pitcher of the Week, and a mid-season Eastern League All Star. After the season, he pitched for Team USA in the 2015 Pan American Games, which won the silver medal. 2015 marked the first time Eflin would work with catcher Andrew Knapp, with whom he developed a strong rapport that lasted once both reached the major leagues; although Knapp has been the Phillies' backup catcher, he often plays when Eflin pitches, and Eflin has recorded better statistics with Knapp behind the plate than other Phillies' catchers. Eflin has said of Knapp, "Sometimes, I feel like he knows me better than myself ... A great thing about Knappy is he cares a lot more about the pitch calling and defensive catching than he does hitting. I'm not saying he doesn't care about hitting, but his main goal is to be a catcher that pitchers trust."

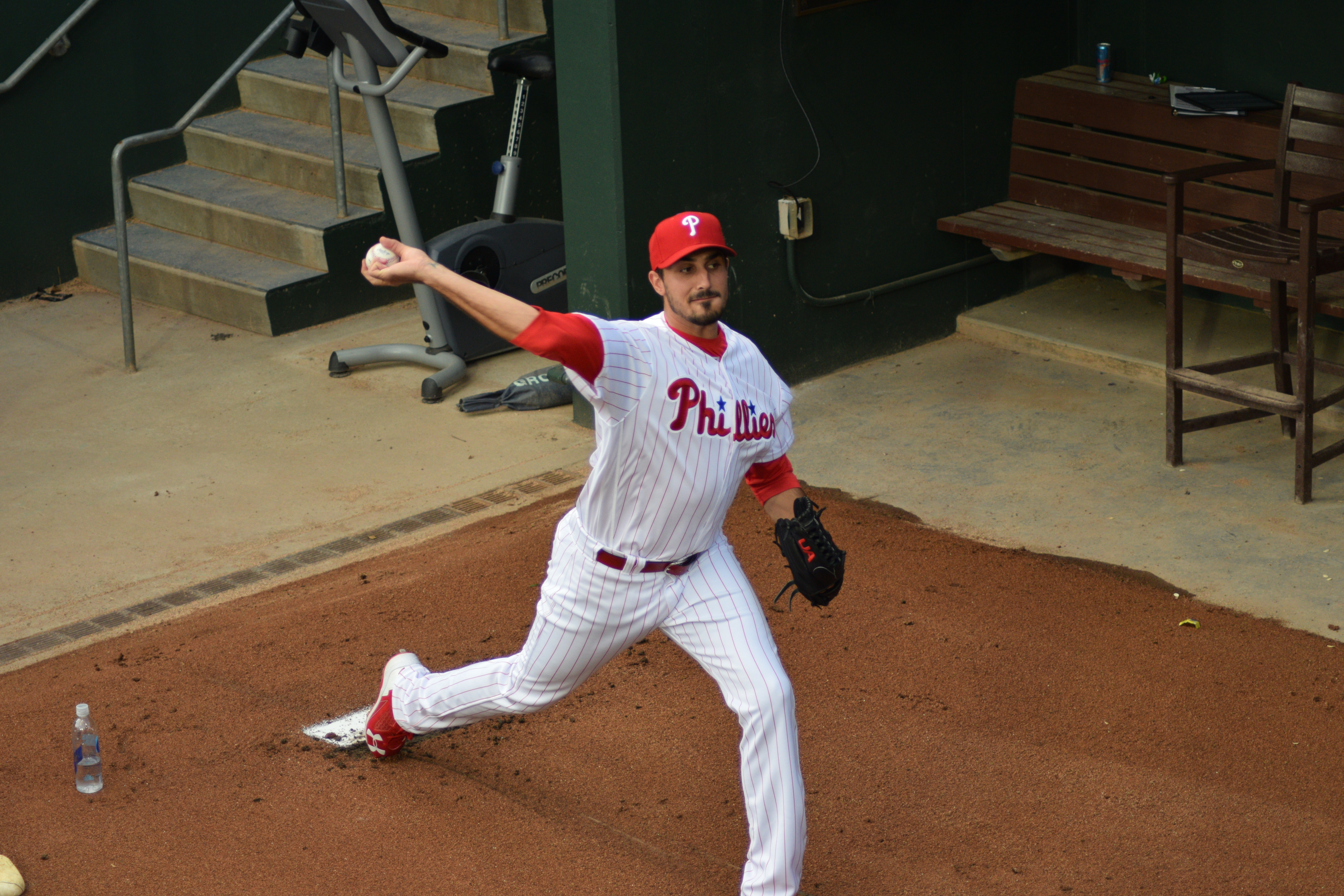
Eflin warming up in the bullpen before a game during the 2018 season

Eflin received another invitation to spring training in 2016. Eflin began the 2016 season with the Lehigh Valley IronPigs of the Triple-A International League, and was named the league's Pitcher of the Week on April 18. With Lehigh Valley, he was 5–2 with a 2.90 ERA and 55 strikeouts in 68 1/3 innings. Eflin made his MLB debut on June 14, 2016, at 22 years of age (making him the fourth-youngest pitcher to debut for the Phillies since 2000), allowing eight earned runs by the Toronto Blue Jays in 2 2/3 innings on nine hits, three of which were home runs. Eflin's game score of five was the sixth-worst debut in major league history, and worst in Phillies franchise history. Eflin rebounded with two complete games in the month of July, including a Maddux shutout of the Atlanta Braves. The Phillies placed Eflin on the disabled list on August 9 due to patellar tendinopathy in both knees, and he underwent a pair of season-ending knee surgeries in August and September, respectively. In 2016 with the Phillies, he was 3–5 with a 5.54 ERA, and 31 strikeouts in 63 1/3 innings.

Eflin began the 2017 season on the 10-day disabled list in an effort to continue recovery from both knees. He was activated on April 11 and optioned to Triple-A. He was the April 17, 2017, International League Pitcher of the Week. On April 18, he was recalled by the Phillies to replace an injured Clay Buchholz in the rotation. His season debut was the same night against the New York Mets, and he began a 29-inning streak of not allowing any runs to opposing hitters that spanned four starts. At the end of May, he returned to the minor leagues, and in June, he missed time due to an injured elbow. In 2017 with the Phillies, he was 1–5 with a 6.16 ERA, and 35 strikeouts in 64 1/3 innings, following a strong start to the season by struggling to its finish. That season—his time split between Lehigh Valley, the Class A-Advanced Clearwater Threshers, and the GCL Phillies—he combined to go 2–4 with a 3.74 ERA and 50 strikeouts in 55 1/3 minor league innings.

==== Major league starter (2018–2022) ====
Eflin once again opened the 2018 season in Triple-A Lehigh Valley, but he returned to the major leagues by the end of April. Armed with a new approach on the mound, he recorded career-high strikeout totals throughout the season and spent almost the entire remainder of the season with the big-league club. For the season, Eflin was 11–8 with a 4.36 ERA, and 123 strikeouts in 128 innings. With Lehigh Valley, he was 2–2 with a 4.05 ERA and 15 strikeouts in 20 innings. From 2019 onward, Eflin remained entirely in the major leagues. He began the 2019 season in the starting rotation before being placed on the disabled list on May 31 with a back injury. In 2019 with the Phillies, Eflin was 10–13 with a 4.13 ERA. In 28 starts, he pitched two complete games (leading the National League) and one shutout. In total, he pitched 163 1/3 innings and gave up 28 home runs, eighth most in the National League. During the 2018 and 2019 seasons, Phillies manager Gabe Kapler and pitching coach Chris Young advised Eflin to try to be a power pitcher, overpowering hitters with high fastballs and hard breaking pitches. Although the approach initially showed signs of success, leading to speculation he could be an all-star candidate, he eventually began to struggle before suffering an injury midway through the season and losing his spot in the Phillies' starting rotation. He eventually abandoned that approach, returning to focus on his sinker and not being afraid to pitch to contact during the abbreviated 2020 season. He also, for the first time in his career, became more aggressive in throwing a curveball that became central to his repertoire. He ultimately made 11 starts in 2020, and the Phillies won eight of them; he also posted a career-best 10.9 strikeouts per nine innings to accompany a 3.97 ERA and 4–2 record.

Entering the 2021 season, analysts, coaches, and teammates suggested Eflin could be a candidate for a breakout season near the top of the Phillies' starting rotation. New Phillies pitching coach Caleb Cotham said in his opening press conferences that the Phillies' starting rotation has three potential candidates for the Cy Young Award, which the media has interpreted to mean Nola, Zack Wheeler, and Eflin. Eflin worked to a 4–7 record and 4.17 ERA with 99 strikeouts in 18 starts for the Phillies in 2021. On September 8, 2021, it was announced that Eflin would undergo season-ending knee surgery to repair a tear in his right patellar tendon.

In the 2022 regular season he was 3–5 with one save and a 4.04 ERA over 75.2 innings in 20 games (13 starts). But later Eflin suffered a right knee contusion and he was placed on the 60-day injured list. After he was reactivated in September, Eflin was moved to bullpen, and he had a 3.38 ERA over 10 2/3 playoff innings in 10 games, and earned a save in Phillies' series-clinching win over Cardinals in Game 2 of the NL Wild Card Series.

On November 7, 2022, two days after Phillies lost the 2022 World Series, Eflin declined his end of the mutual option for 2023 season, and became a free agent for the first time in his career, receiving a $150,000 buyout.

=== Tampa Bay Rays (2023–2024) ===
On December 13, 2022, the Tampa Bay Rays signed Eflin to a three-year, $40 million contract. This was the largest free agent deal in Rays history, topping the five-year, $35 million contract given to Wilson Álvarez before their inaugural 1998 season. Eflin was reportedly offered the exact same contract terms by the division-rival Boston Red Sox, but declined, citing his Orlando roots and the opportunity to work with Rays pitching coach Kyle Snyder. Eflin made 31 starts for Tampa Bay in 2023, compiling a 16–8 record and 3.50 ERA with 186 strikeouts across 177 2/3 innings of work.

Eflin began the 2024 campaign in the Rays' rotation, logging a 5–7 record and 4.09 ERA with 87 strikeouts across 19 starts.

=== Baltimore Orioles (2024–2026) ===
On July 26, 2024, Eflin was traded with cash considerations to the Baltimore Orioles in exchange for Matthew Etzel, Jackson Baumeister, and Mac Horvath. He won his Orioles debut in an 11–5 home victory over the Toronto Blue Jays three days later in the first game of a two-night doubleheader on July 29. He completed six innings, struck out seven without a walk and gave up ten hits which included an Addison Barger one-out, three-run homer in the fifth. He went on the injured list with right shoulder inflammation on August 20. He joined Jack Harshman as the second Orioles pitcher to win each of his first five appearances with the ballclub in a 6–1 away victory over the Colorado Rockies after being activated twelve days later on September 1.

Eflin was named the Opening Day starting pitcher for the Orioles on March 14, 2025. He made 14 starts for Baltimore during the 2025 campaign, compiling a 6–5 record and 5.93 ERA with 50 strikeouts across 71 1/3 innings pitched. On August 12, 2025, manager Tony Mansolino announced that Eflin would miss the remainder of the season due to a lumbar microdiscectomy procedure. Eflin was formally transferred to the 60-day injured list on August 17.

On December 28, 2025, the Orioles re-signed Eflin to a one-year deal with a mutual option for 2027. He made his first start of the season against the Texas Rangers on March 31, 2026, but exited the game in the fourth inning with a right elbow injury. The Orioles placed Eflin on the 60-day injured list on April 7. On April 8, the Orioles announced that Eflin underwent ulnar collateral ligament reconstruction, causing him to miss the remainder of the season. On October 30, 2026, the Orioles declined Eflin's mutual option.

== Pitcher profile ==
Eflin was a middle-of-the-rotation starting pitcher when with the Phillies, and is known for relying on a sinker (93 miles per hour (150 km/h)) and slider (88 miles per hour (142 km/h)) combination in pursuit of groundball outs and for having strong command of his pitches, issuing few walks. Long prone to pitch to contact, in 2018, Eflin began to throw harder, aiming to blow pitches past hitters and record strikeouts. He moved away from that approach after struggling in 2019, and, by 2020, he had largely returned to his roots in terms of how he approached batters. In 2020, he began to incorporate a 79 miles per hour (127 km/h) curveball more regularly in his repertoire, diminishing his reliance on a changeup. This decision helped him record more strikeouts and fueled expectations entering the 2021 season that he could be a number one starting pitcher. He has had a history of knee injuries, however, and has never pitched more than 163 1/3 innings in a single season—he has acknowledged that his durability is a concern.

== Personal life ==
Eflin married his longtime girlfriend Lauren Dennen in December 2020. They have four children together, including a daughter born October 9, 2021, twin girls born March 2023, and a son born in February 2025.

He has done work to support pediatric patients in Philadelphia hospitals, including appearances at sleepovers in the Phillies' clubhouse.
