= Brock Jones =

Tampa Bay Rays
- Outfielder
- Born: March 28, 2001 (age 25); Fresno, California, U.S.
- Bats: Left Throws: Left

Brock Kenneth Jones (born March 28, 2001) is an American professional baseball outfielder in the Tampa Bay Rays organization.

== Amateur career ==
Jones attended Buchanan High School in Clovis, California, where he played baseball and football. As a junior in 2018, he batted .346 with two home runs, 15 RBIs, and 34 runs scored. Unselected out of high school in the 2019 Major League Baseball draft, he enrolled at Stanford University to play both baseball and football.

Jones made 11 appearances for the Cardinal football team as a freshman before choosing to focus solely on baseball. As a freshman for the baseball team, he started 16 games in which he batted .228 with one home run before the season was cancelled due to the COVID-19 pandemic. In 2021, as a redshirt freshman, Jones started 56 games in which he slashed .311/.453/.646 with 18 home runs, 62 RBIs, 14 stolen bases, and 13 doubles. That summer, he was selected to play for the USA Baseball Collegiate National Team. Jones entered the 2022 season as a top prospect for the upcoming draft. Over 65 games, he compiled a slash line of .324/.451/.664 with 21 home runs and 57 RBIs and was awarded an ABCA/Rawlings Gold Glove.

== Professional career ==
The Tampa Bay Rays selected Jones in the second round with the 65th overall pick in the 2022 Major League Baseball draft. He signed with the team for $1.1 million.

Jones made his professional debut with the Florida Complex League Rays and was later promoted to the Charleston RiverDogs. Over 19 games between both teams, he hit .265 with four home runs, 14 RBIs, and 11 stolen bases. Jones played the 2023 season with the Bowling Green Hot Rods, batting .201 with 15 home runs and 49 RBIs over 85 games. He returned to Bowling Green for the 2024 season and hit .224 with 17 home runs, 49 RBIs, and 32 stolen bases over 94 games. Jones was assigned to the Montgomery Biscuits to open the 2025 season and was promoted to the Durham Bulls during the season. Over 96 games, he hit .178 with 13 home runs, 46 RBIs, and 24 stolen bases. Jones played the 2026 season with Montgomery and Durham and batted .195 with eight home runs and 21 RBIs over 75 games.
