= Dylan Lesko =

American baseball player (born 2003)

Tampa Bay Rays
- Pitcher
- Born: September 7, 2003 (age 23); Atlanta, Georgia, U.S.
- Bats: Right Throws: Right

Dylan Joseph Lesko (born September 7, 2003) is an American baseball pitcher in the Tampa Bay Rays organization.

== Amateur career ==
Lesko attended Buford High School in Buford, Georgia. In 2021, he became the first junior to win the Gatorade Baseball Player of the Year after going 11–0 with a 0.35 earned run average (ERA) with 112 strikeouts in 60 innings. He was also named the Gwinnett Daily Post Baseball Pitcher of the Year. During the summer of 2021, he combined with other pitchers to throw a no-hitter in the Perfect Game All-American Classic at Petco Park.

Lesko committed to Vanderbilt University to play college baseball. His senior baseball season in 2022 ended when he tore the UCL in his pitching elbow, an injury that required Tommy John surgery, which he underwent on April 26 and was expected to sideline him until 2024.

== Professional career ==
=== San Diego Padres ===
Lesko was considered the top pitcher available in the 2022 Major League Baseball draft before the season started. Despite his recent Tommy John surgery, San Diego Padres selected Lesko in the first round, with the 15th overall selection, of the draft. Lesko signed with the Padres for a $3.9 million signing bonus, forgoing his commitment to Vanderbilt.

Lesko returned to play and made his professional debut in 2023, splitting the year between the rookie–level Arizona Complex League Padres, Single–A Lake Elsinore Storm, and High–A Fort Wayne TinCaps. In 12 total starts, he accumulated a 1–5 record and 5.45 ERA with 52 strikeouts across 33 innings pitched. Lesko was assigned back to Fort Wayne to open the 2024 season.

=== Tampa Bay Rays ===
On July 28, 2024, Lesko, Homer Bush Jr., and J.D. Gonzalez were traded to the Tampa Bay Rays in exchange for Jason Adam. The Rays assigned him to the High–A Bowling Green Hot Rods. Over 22 games (19 starts) between Fort Wayne and Bowling Green, Lesko went 2-12 with a 6.96 ERA, 100 strikeouts, and 75 walks over 84 innings. Lesko returned to Bowling Green to open the 2025 season.
