= Caden Bodine =

American baseball player (born 2003)

Tampa Bay Rays
- Catcher
- Born: December 2, 2003 (age 22); Mount Holly, New Jersey, U.S.
- Bats: Switch Throws: Right
- Stats at Baseball Reference

Career highlights and awards
- Buster Posey Award (2025)

Caden Garrett Bodine (born December 2, 2003) is an American professional baseball catcher in the Tampa Bay Rays organization.

== Amateur career ==
Bodine attended Haddon Heights Jr./Sr. High School in Haddon Heights, New Jersey from 2016-2022. Bodine played catcher, middle infield, and outfield where he then was recruited and committed to Coastal Carolina University to play college baseball as one of the top catching prospect in the state. In 2023, he played collegiate summer baseball with the Bourne Braves of the Cape Cod Baseball League, was named a league all-star, and returned to the Braves in 2024.

As a junior in 2025, Bodine led the Chanticleers to the 2025 College World Series finals and won the Buster Posey Award. In 67 games, he hit .318/.454/.461 with five home runs and 42 RBI.

== Professional career ==
=== Baltimore Orioles ===
Bodine was selected by the Baltimore Orioles with the 30th overall pick in the 2025 Major League Baseball draft. On July 17, 2025, he signed with the Orioles for a $3.1 million signing bonus. Bodine made 11 appearances for the Single-A Delmarva Shorebirds, batting .326/.408/.349 with four RBI.

=== Tampa Bay Rays ===
On December 19, 2025, the Orioles traded Bodine (alongside Austin Overn, Slater de Brun, and Michael Forret) to the Tampa Bay Rays in exchange for Shane Baz.
