= Slater de Brun =

American baseball player (born 2007)

Tampa Bay Rays
- Outfielder
- Born: June 8, 2007 (age 19); Santa Monica, California, U.S.
- Bats: Left Throws: Left

Slater Iain de Brun (born June 8, 2007) is an American professional baseball outfielder in the Tampa Bay Rays organization. He was drafted with the 37th overall selection in the 2025 MLB draft by the Baltimore Orioles.

== Early life ==
De Brun was born in Santa Monica, California. His mother is Canadian and was a television personality on channels such as CBC, TSN and TV Ontario. His father played Division I squash at Brown University.

== Amateur career ==
De Brun attended Summit High School in Bend, Oregon. In Summer 2024, he played with USA Baseball's 18U National Team. As a senior in 2025, he led Summit to the state championship and hit .370 with 26 runs batted in (RBI) and 22 stolen bases.

De Brun was considered a top prospect for the 2025 Major League Baseball draft. He was committed to play college baseball at Vanderbilt University.

== Professional career ==
De Brun was selected with the 37th overall pick by the Baltimore Orioles in the 2025 Major League Baseball draft.

On December 19, 2025, the Orioles traded de Brun (alongside Austin Overn, Caden Bodine, and Michael Forret) to the Tampa Bay Rays in exchange for Shane Baz. de Brun opened the 2026 season on the 60-day injured list while recovering from wrist surgery.

== Personal life ==
De Brun also makes music under the name Lil Slayyy.
