= Jason Adam =

American baseball player (born 1991)

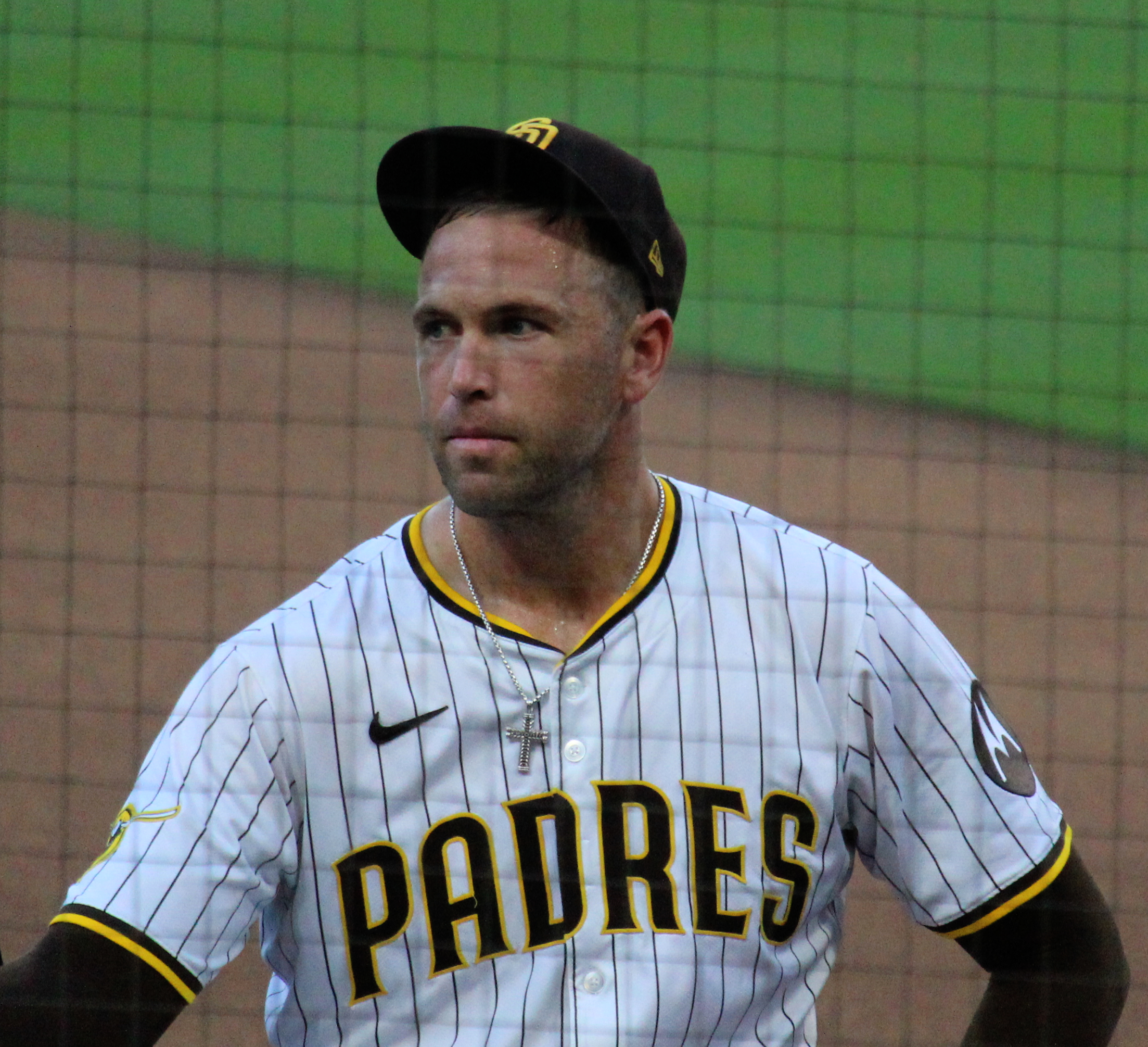
- Adam with the San Diego Padres in 2025

Free agent
- Pitcher
- Born: August 4, 1991 (age 35); Omaha, Nebraska, U.S.
- Bats: Right Throws: Right

MLB debut
- May 5, 2018, for the Kansas City Royals

MLB statistics (through 2026 season)
- Win–loss record: 29–17
- Earned run average: 2.68
- Strikeouts: 412
- Stats at Baseball Reference

Teams
- Kansas City Royals (2018); Toronto Blue Jays (2019); Chicago Cubs (2020–2021); Tampa Bay Rays (2022–2024); San Diego Padres (2024–2026)

Career highlights and awards
- All-Star (2025)
Medals
Men's baseball
Representing United States
World Baseball Classic
Silver medal – second place	2023 Miami	Team

Jason Kendall Adam (born August 4, 1991) is an American professional baseball pitcher who is a free agent. He has played in Major League Baseball (MLB) for the Kansas City Royals, Toronto Blue Jays, Chicago Cubs, Tampa Bay Rays, and San Diego Padres. In 2025, Adam was named to his first All-Star game.

== Early life ==
Adam attended Blue Valley Northwest High School in Overland Park, Kansas, and played for the school's baseball team. In his senior season, Adam pitched 41 2/3 innings with a 2.16 earned run average. His 79 strikeouts to just 7 walks impressed scouts.

== Professional career ==
=== Kansas City Royals ===
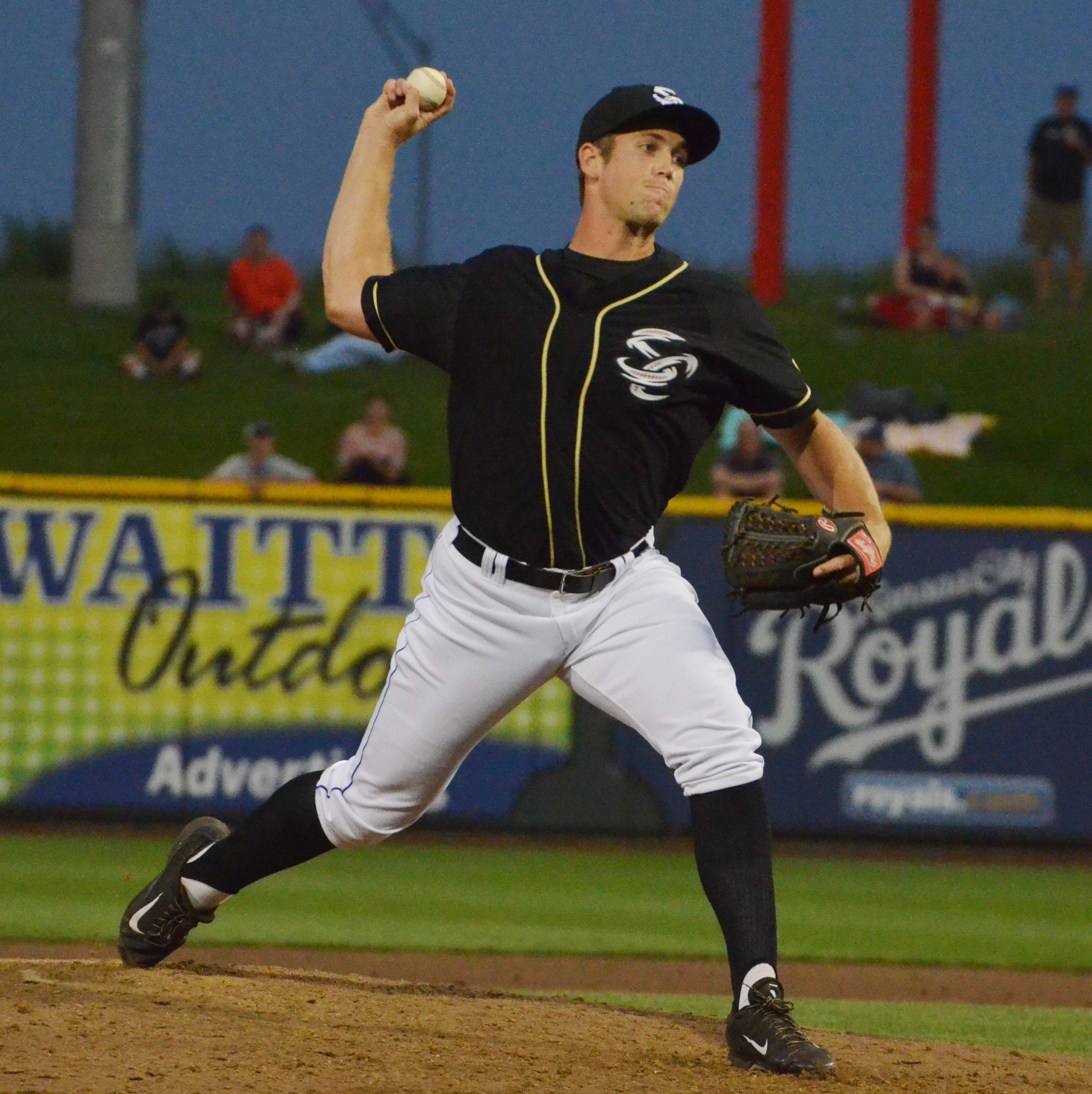
Adam with the Omaha Storm Chasers in 2014

The Kansas City Royals drafted Adam in the fifth round of the 2010 MLB draft and he signed with the Royals, forgoing his college commitment to the University of Missouri. He made his professional debut in 2011 for the Single-A Kane County Cougars, recording a 6–9 record and 4.23 ERA in 21 appearances. The next year, Adam spent the season with the High-A Wilmington Blue Rocks, pitching to a 7–12 record and 3.53 ERA in 158.0 innings pitched. In 2013, Adam played for the Double-A Northwest Arkansas Naturals, registering a 8–11 record and 5.19 ERA in 26 games. He appeared in 26 games between the Naturals and the Triple-A Omaha Storm Chasers in 2014.

=== Minnesota Twins ===
On August 11, 2014, Adam was traded to the Minnesota Twins in exchange for Josh Willingham. Adam did not play in a game in 2015 or 2016 due to injury and elected free agency on November 7, 2016.

=== San Diego Padres ===
On July 20, 2017, Adam signed a minor league deal with the San Diego Padres organization. Adam pitched two scoreless innings for the Double-A San Antonio Missions, and appeared in seven games for the rookie-level Arizona League Padres before he was released on August 14.

=== Kansas City Royals (second stint) ===
On August 18, 2017, Adam signed a minor league contract with the Kansas City Royals. He finished the year with the Northwest Arkansas Naturals, posting a 7.11 ERA over five appearances. The Royals called up Adam on May 4, 2018, and he made his major league debut the next day. In 2018, Adam appeared in 31 games, registering an ERA of 6.12 in 32 1/3 innings. On November 30, he was non-tendered by the Royals, making him a free agent. On December 17, the Royals re-signed Adam to a minor league contract.

=== Toronto Blue Jays ===
On March 17, 2019, Adam was traded to the Toronto Blue Jays in exchange for cash considerations. He was assigned to the Triple–A Buffalo Bisons and put on the injured list to start the 2019 season. On August 1, the Blue Jays selected Adam's contract to the active roster. Adam earned his first major league win on August 10, pitching an inning of relief in Toronto's 5–4 victory over the New York Yankees. He finished the season with a 2.91 ERA in 23 games with the Blue Jays. He gave up the lowest percentage of hard-hit balls of all major league pitchers (20.0%). Adam became a free agent on December 2 after being non-tendered by the Blue Jays.

=== Chicago Cubs ===
On January 14, 2020, Adam signed a minor league contract with the Chicago Cubs organization. On August 16, Adam was selected to the active roster. On the season, he pitched to a 3.29 ERA and a 2–1 record with 21 strikeouts in 13 2/3 innings of work. Adam pitched to an 8.22 ERA in 9 appearances to begin 2021 before he was sent down to the Triple-A Iowa Cubs. On May 21, 2021, Adam underwent surgery to repair a dislocated left ankle. He was designated for assignment by the Cubs on May 25. On May 26, Adam was released by Chicago. Adam re-signed with the Cubs on a minor league contract on July 12. On September 26, Adam was selected to the 40-man and active rosters. On November 30, Adam was non-tendered by the Cubs, making him a free agent.

=== Tampa Bay Rays ===
On March 17, 2022, Adam signed a one-year deal with the Tampa Bay Rays. On June 4, Adam, along with four other Rays teammates, opted out of wearing a Rays team logo and cap in support of LGBTQ+ Pride, during the team's annual Pride Night celebration at Tropicana Field. Adam, as the player chosen by team officials to speak for those that opted out, said that “A lot of it comes down to faith, to like a faith-based decision…we don’t want to encourage it if we believe in Jesus, who's encouraged us to live a lifestyle that would abstain from that behavior.”

In the 2022 season, Adam established himself as a quality major league reliever. After making the team out of spring training he became a useful force for the Tampa Bay bullpen. He finished the season with a 1.56 ERA in 67 appearance and recorded 8 saves. In game 2 of the 2022 American League Wild Card Series against the Cleveland Indians, Adam inherited two runners and then hit Amed Rosario. Facing bases loaded and no outs, he struck out José Ramírez and then forced an inning ending double play off the bat of Josh Naylor to keep the game tied 0–0 at the end of six innings. The Rays would go on to lose this game 0–1 in 15 innings. Adam ended the postseason with 2 innings pitched, 1 hit allowed, and no runs.

Adam's salary for the 2023 season was determined by the arbitration process to be $1.775 million. He made 56 appearances for Tampa Bay in 2023, recording a 2.98 ERA with 69 strikeouts and 12 saves across 54 1/3 innings of work.

Adam pitched in 47 contests for the Rays in 2024, compiling a 2.49 ERA with 50 strikeouts and 4 saves over 47 innings of work.

=== San Diego Padres (second stint) ===
On July 28, 2024, Adam was traded to the San Diego Padres in exchange for Dylan Lesko, Homer Bush Jr., and J.D. Gonzalez. He made 27 relief appearances for San Diego down the stretch, posting a 3-0 record and 1.01 ERA with 31 strikeouts across 26 2/3 innings pitched.

Adam made 65 appearances for San Diego in 2025 en route to his first career All-Star selection; he compiled an 8-4 record and 1.93 ERA with 70 strikeouts over 65 1/3 innings. On September 1, 2025, Adam departed a game against the Baltimore Orioles, and was later diagnosed with tendon rupture in his left quad. He was transferred to the 60-day injured list on September 30, officially ending his season ahead of San Diego's Wild Card Series matchup against the Chicago Cubs.

Adam began the 2026 season on the injured list as he continued to recover from quad surgery. On April, 10, 2026, he was activated and made his season debut against the Colorado Rockies, recording the final out of the top of the eighth inning. On July 2, Adam was placed on the injured list due to a right shoulder strain. He was transferred to the 60–day injured list on August 3. Adam was activated on September 23.

== International career ==
Adam was named as a relief pitcher for the United States national team in the 2023 World Baseball Classic. Over the course of four games he pitched 4.0 innings, allowing zero runs and just one hit (a double to Salvador Pérez in Team USA's quarterfinal win against Venezuela), while getting five strikeouts. He pitched in the final against Japan, issuing three walks but striking out Munetaka Murakami and Kazuma Okamoto.

== Personal life ==
Adam is an evangelical Christian and wears a cross around his neck when he pitches. Adam is married to Kelsey Adam. They have four daughters.
