= Cooper Kinney =

American baseball player (born 2003)

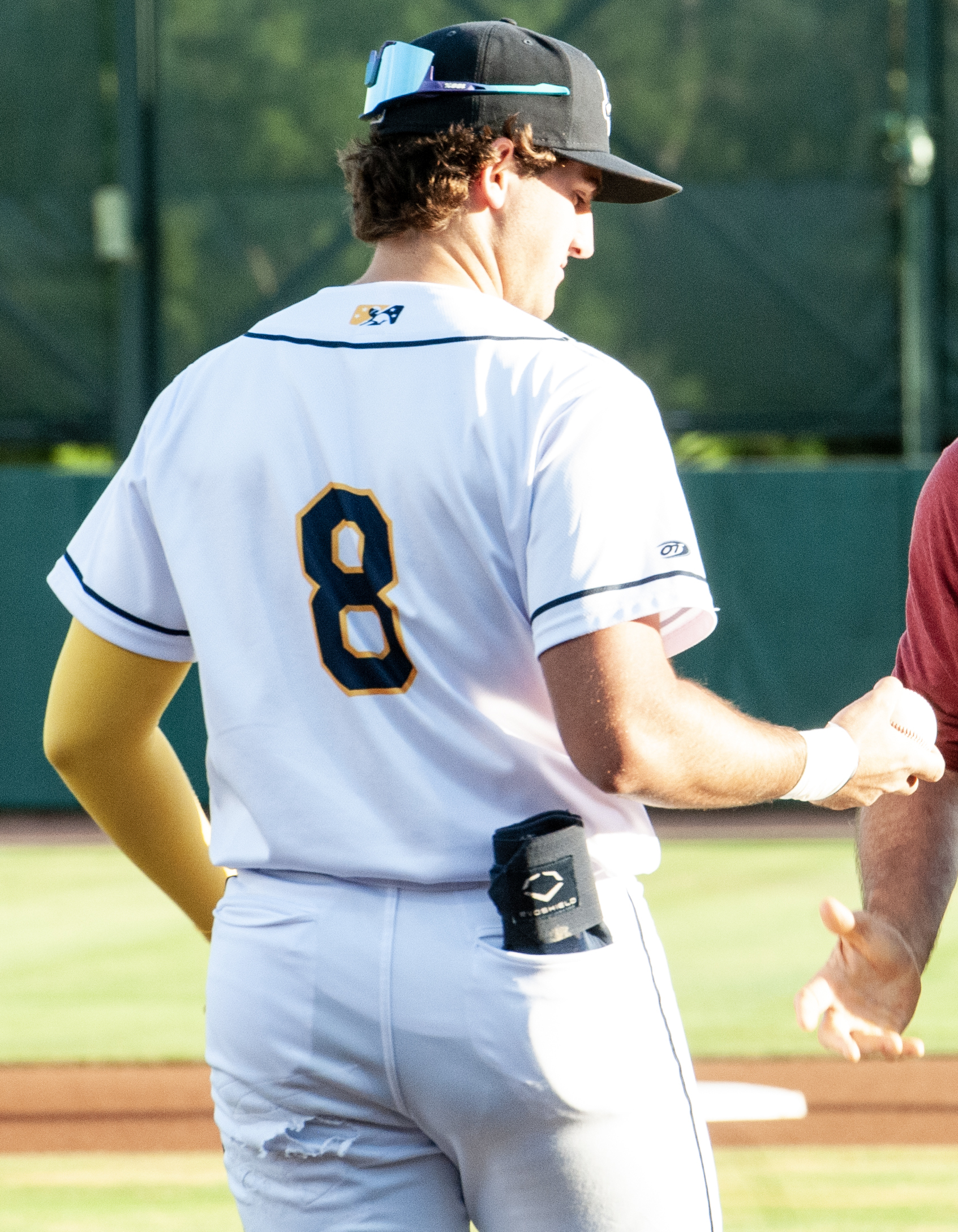
- Kinney with the Charleston RiverDogs in 2023

Tampa Bay Rays
- Second baseman
- Born: January 27, 2003 (age 23); Kennesaw, Georgia, U.S.
- Bats: Left Throws: Right
Medals
Men's baseball
Representing United States
U-12 Baseball World Cup
Gold medal – first place	2015 Tainan	Team

Cooper Michael Kinney (born January 27, 2003) is an American professional baseball second baseman in the Tampa Bay Rays organization.

== Amateur career ==
Kinney attended Baylor School in Chattanooga, Tennessee, where he played baseball under his father, Mike. In 2019, as a sophomore, he batted .396 with five home runs. As a senior in 2021, he hit .480 with ten home runs and fifty RBIs and was named the Tennessee Gatorade Player of the Year. He committed to play college baseball at the University of South Carolina.

== Professional career ==
Kinney was selected by the Tampa Bay Rays in the first competitive balance round with the 34th overall selection of the 2021 Major League Baseball draft. He signed with the Rays for a $2.1 million signing bonus.

Kinney made his professional debut with the Florida Complex League Rays, slashing .286/.468/.371 with five RBIs over 35 at-bats. He missed all of the 2022 season due to undergoing shoulder surgery. Kinney returned to play in 2023 with the Charleston RiverDogs and batted .274 with ten home runs and 61 RBIs over 121 games. In 2024, he played with the Bowling Green Hot Rods and hit .289 with ten home runs, 63 RBIs, and 32 doubles over 87 games. Kinney was assigned to the Montgomery Biscuits for the 2025 season. Over 117 games, he batted .242 with 13 home runs and 62 RBIs. Kinney returned to Montgomery to start the 2026 season and was promoted to the Durham Bulls in early May. Across 105 games with both teams, he hit .270 with 15 home runs and 68 RBIs.

Kinney was signed by the Navegantes del Magallanes for the 2026–27 Venezuelan Winter League season.
