= Jackson Baumeister =

American baseball player (born 2002)

Tampa Bay Rays
- Pitcher
- Born: July 10, 2002 (age 24); Jacksonville, Florida, U.S.
- Bats: Right Throws: Right

Jackson Joseph Baumeister (born July 10, 2002) is an American professional baseball pitcher in the Tampa Bay Rays organization.

== Amateur career ==
Baumeister attended The Bolles School and played college baseball at Florida State University. In Baumeister's freshman season at Florida State, he pitched in 27 1/3 innings across 19 appearances. After this freshman year, Baumeister played collegiate summer baseball for the Hyannis Harbor Hawks of the Cape Cod Baseball League. As a sophomore in 2023, he pitched 69 innings in which he struck out 95 batters and walked only 29, and finished the year with a 5.09 ERA. He was awarded Third Team All-Atlantic Coast Conference honors.

== Professional career ==
=== Baltimore Orioles ===
Baumeister was selected by the Baltimore Orioles in the second round, with the 63rd overall selection, of the 2023 Major League Baseball draft. On July 25, 2023, Baumeister signed with the Orioles for a $1.6 million signing bonus. He made his professional debut in 2024 with the High–A Aberdeen IronBirds, making 18 starts and posting a 3.06 ERA with 91 strikeouts across 70 2/3 innings pitched.

=== Tampa Bay Rays ===
On July 26, 2024, Baumeister, Matthew Etzel, and Mac Horvath were traded to the Tampa Bay Rays in exchange for Zach Eflin and cash considerations. The Rays assigned him to the High–A Bowling Green Hot Rods with whom he had a 1.24 ERA and 44 strikeouts across 29 innings. In 2025, Baumeister was assigned to the Double–A Montgomery Biscuits and made 15 starts in which he had a 2–4 record, a 4.62 ERA, and 51 strikeouts across 62 1/3 innings. After the season, he was assigned to play in the Arizona Fall League with the Mesa Solar Sox. Baumeister returned to Montgomery for the 2026 season and started 24 games, ending the season with a 4–6 record, a 5.14 ERA, and 111 strikeouts across 103 1/3 innings.
