= Levi Romero (baseball) =

Venezuelan baseball player

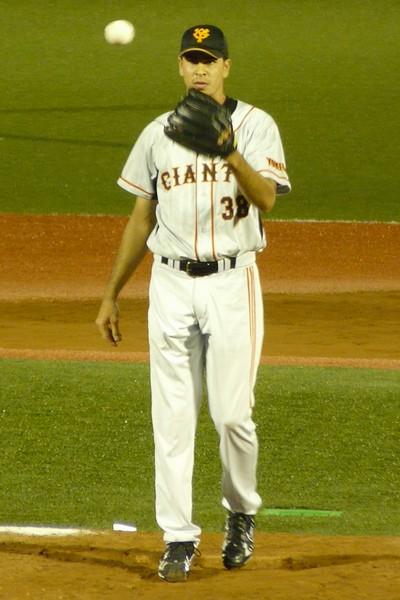
- Romero with the Yomiuri Giants
- Pitcher
- Born: April 12, 1984 (age 42); El Tigre, Venezuela
- Bats: Right Throws: Right

NPB debut
- 2010, for the Chunichi Dragons

NPB statistics (through 2012)
- Win–loss record: 2–3
- Earned run average: 3.10
- Strikeouts: 48
- Stats at Baseball Reference

Teams
- Yomiuri Giants (2009–2012); Fukuoka SoftBank Hawks (2012)

Levi Jose Romero (born April 12, 1984) is a Venezuelan former professional baseball pitcher. Romero played in the Houston Astros and Texas Rangers minor league systems from 2003 to 2008. He also played for the Yomiuri Giants and Fukuoka SoftBank Hawks in Nippon Professional Baseball from 2009 to 2012. He was named the pitching coach of the Charleston RiverDogs, a minor league affiliate of the Tampa Bay Rays, in 2023. In 2026, Romero was named as assistant pitching coach for the FCL Rays the rookie-level affiliate of the Tampa Bay Rays.
