= Theo Gillen =

American baseball player (born 2005)

Tampa Bay Rays
- Center fielder
- Born: September 12, 2005 (age 21); Chicago, Illinois, U.S.
- Bats: Left Throws: Right
- Stats at Baseball Reference

Theodore Gillen (born September 12, 2005) is an American professional baseball center fielder in the Tampa Bay Rays organization.

== Amateur career ==
Gillen attended Westlake High School in Austin, Texas, where he played baseball. Injuries to his labrum and knee forced him to miss playing time early in his high school career. As a senior in 2024, he batted .415 with seven home runs, thirty RBIs, and 29 stolen bases. He committed to play college baseball for the Texas Longhorns.

== Professional career ==
Gillen was selected by the Tampa Bay Rays with the 18th overall pick in the 2024 Major League Baseball draft. On July 26, 2024, Gillen signed with the Rays on a $4.37 million contract.

Gillen made his professional debut with the Single-A Charleston RiverDogs, batting .154 over eight games. He returned to Charleston for the 2025 season. Gillen was placed on the injured list for four weeks in April due to a calf injury. He was placed on the injured list for a second time with a finger fracture in August, ending his season. Over 73 games for the season, Gillen hit .267 with five home runs, 18 RBI, and 36 stolen bases. He was assigned to the High-A Bowling Green Hot Rods to open the 2026 season. Gillen batted .342 with 12 home runs, 44 RBI and 28 stolen bases across 57 games and was promoted to the Double-A Montgomery Biscuits in June. In July, he was selected to represent the Rays at the 2026 All-Star Futures Game alongside Nathan Flewelling. Across 59 games with Montgomery to end the 2026 season, Gillen hit .288 with ten home runs, 47 RBI, and 16 stolen bases.
