= Taj Marchand =

American baseball player (born 2008)

Tampa Bay Rays
- Shortstop
- Born: July 27, 2008 (age 18); Charleston, South Carolina, U.S.
- Bats: Right Throws: Right

Taj Marchand (born July 27, 2008) is an American professional baseball shortstop in the Tampa Bay Rays organization.

== Amateur career ==
Marchand played ice hockey as a child in addition to baseball. He attended James Island High School in Charleston, South Carolina. As a senior in 2026, he hit .531 with 13 home runs, 45 RBI, and 11 doubles alongside striking out 32 batters in 19 innings as a relief pitcher. He was named to the All-State team alongside being named the South Carolina Baseball Coaches Association Player of the Year. MaxPreps also named him their South Carolina Baseball Player of the Year. After the season, he attended the MLB Draft Combine at Chase Field. He committed to play college baseball at the University of Mississippi for the Ole Miss Rebels.

== Professional career ==
Marchand was considered a top prospect for the 2026 Major League Baseball draft. He was selected by the Tampa Bay Rays with the 33rd overall pick. He signed with the Rays for 2.5 million.

== Personal life ==
Marchand's father, Hugo, was selected in the seventh round of the 1997 NHL draft by the Toronto Maple Leafs and played nine seasons of minor league hockey.
