= Mac Horvath =

American baseball player (born 2001)

Tampa Bay Rays
- Outfielder
- Born: July 22, 2001 (age 25); Austin, Minnesota, U.S.
- Bats: Right Throws: Right
- Stats at Baseball Reference

Macauley Cole Horvath (born July 22, 2001) is an American professional baseball outfielder in the Tampa Bay Rays organization.

== Early life and high school ==
Born in Austin, Minnesota, Horvath grew up in nearby Rochester. A highly-touted shortstop prospect in high school, Horvath played three years for Century High School in his hometown before transferring to play his senior season at vaunted prep school IMG Academy in Bradenton, Florida. However, his senior season was cut short by the COVID-19 pandemic. He committed to play college baseball at North Carolina.

== College career ==
=== Freshman ===
In his freshman season under first-year Tar Heel head coach Scott Forbes, Horvath appeared in 46 games, starting 35. With multi-year starter Danny Serretti the everyday shortstop, Horvath moved over to third base in Chapel Hill. In his freshman season, Horvath hit .227, with 5 home runs and 22 RBIs. He played summer ball for the Rochester Honkers in his hometown following the NCAA season, and hit .287 with four home runs over the Northwoods League season.

=== Sophomore ===
Horvath started all 63 games in which he played in his sophomore season, helping lead the 2022 Tar Heels to the NCAA Super Regionals. On the season, he hit .268, with a .390 on-base percentage and a .557 slugging percentage. His power numbers improved as well, as he hit 18 home runs and drove in 53 RBIs. He also showcased his speed, stealing 19 bases over the course of the 2022 season. Prior to the second game of the Super Regional against Arkansas, Horvath had to undergo emergency appendectomy surgery and missed the game, a 4–3 walk-off loss to end the Tar Heels' season.

In 2022, he played collegiate summer baseball with the Bourne Braves of the Cape Cod Baseball League. He was eligible for the MLB draft, but was not chosen and returned to North Carolina.

=== Junior ===
Once again the Tar Heels' starting third baseman to begin the season, Horvath showed his versatility by moving into the outfield when teammate Johnny Castagnozzi, who also plays third base, returned from an injury. Castagnozzi had filled in for Horvath in the 2022 Super Regionals against Arkansas when Horvath had appendicitis. Horvath's third season in Chapel Hill proved to be his best, as he recorded a slash line of .305/.418/.711 in 60 games played. Like his teammate Vance Honeycutt the season prior, Horvath became a member of the "20-20" club, hitting 24 home runs on the season and stealing 25 bases.

== Professional career ==
=== Baltimore Orioles ===
Horvath was selected by the Baltimore Orioles in the 2nd round, with the 53rd overall pick, of the 2023 Major League Baseball draft. On July 17, 2023, Horvath signed with the Orioles for an under slot deal worth $1.4 million. He split his first professional season between the rookie–level Florida Complex League Orioles, Single–A Delmarva Shorebirds, and High–A Aberdeen Ironbirds.

Horvath returned to Aberdeen in 2024, playing in 71 games and batting .233/.328/.417 with nine home runs, 41 RBI, and 26 stolen bases.

=== Tampa Bay Rays ===
On July 26, 2024, Horvath, Matthew Etzel, and Jackson Baumeister were traded to the Tampa Bay Rays in exchange for Zach Eflin and cash considerations.
