= Florida Complex League Rays =

- (1996–1998, 2009–present); Port Charlotte, Florida; Originally played in St. Petersburg, Florida (1996–1998)
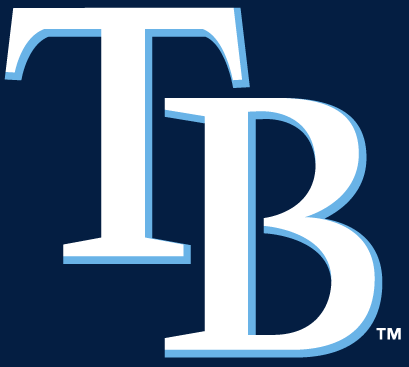

Minor league affiliations
- Class: Rookie
- League: Florida Complex League
- Division: Southern Division
- Previous leagues: Gulf Coast League (1996–1998, 2009–2020)

Major league affiliations
- Team: Tampa Bay Rays
- Previous teams: Tampa Bay Devil Rays (1996–1998)

Minor league titles
- League titles (1): 2021
- Division titles (4): 1998; 2010; 2021; 2022

Team data
- Name: FCL Rays
- Previous names: GCL Rays (2009–2020); GCL Devil Rays (1996–1998)
- Ballpark: Charlotte Sports Park (2009–present)
- Previous parks: Al Lang Stadium (1996–1998)
- Owner/ Operator: Tampa Bay Rays
- Manager: Jim Morrison

The Florida Complex League Rays are a minor league baseball team in Port Charlotte, Florida, competing as a Rookie-level team in the Florida Complex League as an affiliate of the Tampa Bay Rays. Prior to 2021, the team was known as the Gulf Coast League Rays. The team plays most of their home games on field no. five of the Charlotte Sports Park complex, and also play select games in the main stadium.

The team first played from 1996 to 1998 as the Gulf Coast League Devil Rays. The club struggled during their first two years, but made it to the league championship in 1998, before losing to the GCL Rangers. The team was not fielded after the 1998 season until returning to the Gulf Coast League in 2009. Prior to the 2021 season, the league was renamed as the Florida Complex League.

== Season-by-season ==
Year	Record	Finish	Manager	Playoffs
GCL Devil Rays
1996	24-35	13th	Bill Evers	
1997	25-35	12th (t)	Bobby Ramos	
1998	36-24	2nd	Bobby Ramos	Lost League Finals vs. GCL Rangers (2 games to 0); Won 1st Round vs. GCL Marlins (1 game to 0)
GCL Rays
2009	19-36	15th	Joe Alvarez	
2010	34-26	3rd	Joe Alvarez	Lost League Finals vs. GCL Phillies (2 games to 1); Won in first round vs. GCL Marlins (1 game to 0)
2011	24-36	13th	Joe Alvarez	
2012	28-32	10th	Paul Hoover	
2013	27-33	11th (t)	Jim Morrison	
2014	32-28	8th	Jim Morrison	
2015	16-44	16th	Jim Morrison	
2016	28-31	9th	Jim Morrison	
2017	28-32	12th (t)	Jim Morrison	
2018	33-23	4th	Tomas Francisco	
2019	25-28	11th	Rafael Valenzuela	
2020	No Season due to pandemic			
FCL Rays
2021	42-15	1st	Rafael Valenzuela	League champions (Note: In 2021, the league did not have a postseason; FCL Rays had the best winning percentage for the season, 42–15 (.737).)

== Roster ==
Florida Complex League Rays roster
Players	Coaches/Other
Pitchers: 78 Alexander Campos; 30 Alonso Carrera; 99 Jack Hartman #; 58 Matthew Hoskins; 43 Jordi Infante; 44 Luke Jackson #; 85 Brayden Jones #; 59 Janzen Keisel; 65 Xavier Lopez; 90 Roberto Medina; 72 Moises Palma; 55 Rubender Pena; 7 Jeremy Pilon; 95 Efrailin Ramos; 87 Starlin Savinon; 64 Riley Stanford; 94 Miguel Toscano; Catchers: 86 Deinys Gonzalez; 59 Alfredo Rodriguez; 85 Andres Torres; 88 Jose Tovar; Infielders: 63 Andreimi Antunez; 87 Israfell Bautista; 75 Emmanuel Cedeno; 81 Kleiver Chauran; 76 Jose Monzon; 97 Trace Phillips #; Outfielders: 58 Alfonzo Martinez; 97 Carlos Matias; 29 Jacob Melton *#	Manager: 33 Sean Smedley; Coaches: 53 Manny Castillo (coach); -- Angel Galarraga (bullpen catcher); 50 K.C. Judge (hitting); 18 Ty Kelly (hitting); 77 Zac Law (bench); 13 Omar Luna (hitting); 27 Jim Morrison (coach); 26 Chris Roberson (coach); 60 Levi Romero (pitching); 55 Miguel Socolovich (pitching); -- Doc Watson (rehab pitching); 11 Julio Zorrilla (coach); 60-day injured list: 60 Erick Lara; 79 Leonardo Pineda; 7-day injured list; * On Tampa Bay Rays 40-man roster; ~ Development list; # Rehab assignment; ∞ Reserve list; ‡ Restricted list; § Suspended list; † Temporarily inactive list; Roster updated June 19, 2026; Transactions; → More rosters: MiLB • Florida Complex League; → Tampa Bay Rays minor league players
