= Tim Gradoville =

American Baseball Player

- Catcher
- Born: January 30, 1980 (age 46); Mechanicsburg, Pennsylvania
- Bats: right Throws: right

Timothy Robert Gradoville (born January 30, 1980) is an American former professional baseball catcher who played in the Philadelphia Phillies organization from 2002 to 2009. He is known as a phantom major league ballplayer, having spent time on the Philadelphia Phillies' active roster in September 2006 without appearing in a Major League Baseball game.

== Early life and amateur career ==
Gradoville was born in Mechanicsburg, Pennsylvania, and moved as a young child to the suburbs of Denver, Colorado, attending Regis Jesuit High School in Aurora, Colorado. He later enrolled at Creighton University, where he played baseball for the Bluejays. While he started as a redshirt freshman walk-on athlete, during the tenure of his collegiate career, he established himself as one of the program's top defensive catchers and earned recognition for both his athletic and academic achievements. In 2002, he was named to the Verizon Academic All-District VII First Team and the Missouri Valley Conference Scholar-Athlete First Team and also selected as an honorable mention All-Missouri Valley Conference catcher.

As a junior in 2002, Gradoville batted .282 in 52 games, recording 48 hits, 22 runs scored, 10 doubles, and 12 stolen bases. Creighton head coach Jack Dahm described him as one of the program's hardest-working players and among the top defensive catchers in the Midwest.

== Professional Career ==
=== Philadelphia Phillies Organization ===
The Philadelphia Phillies selected Gradoville in the 37th round of the 2002 Major League Baseball draft with the 1,109th overall pick. Following the draft, he signed with the organization and began his professional career in the Phillies' farm system.

Over the next several seasons, Gradoville played for the Gulf Coast League Phillies, Lakewood BlueClaws, Clearwater Threshers, Reading Phillies, Scranton/Wilkes-Barre Red Barons, Ottawa Lynx, and Lehigh Valley IronPigs. He reached the Triple-A level in 2005 and spent portions of multiple seasons between Double-A and Triple-A. He became widely known as a strong defensive backup catcher, stating, "That's one of my strengths... It's a challenge to me when a guy goes. I always want to make a good throw." Over eight minor league seasons, Gradoville appeared in 398 games and compiled a .210 batting average with 247 hits, 9 home runs, 92 runs batted in, and 37 stolen bases. He reached the Triple-A level with Scranton/Wilkes-Barre, Ottawa, and Lehigh Valley. After the 2006 season, he was ranked the best defensive catcher in the Phillies system by Baseball America.

One of the most productive years of his career came in 2006 with the Reading Phillies. Despite missing time after suffering a broken jaw when struck by a pitch, Gradoville batted .261 and led Eastern League catchers by throwing out 52.9 percent of attempted base stealers. During the 2006 season he received the Eugene L. Shirk Community Service Award, an annual honor presented by the Reading Phillies. He was also the team's Gold Glove award honoree in 2007.

=== Major League Call-Up ===
Gradoville's season with Double-A Reading had ended when he received word that the Phillies were promoting him to the major league roster. He had been discussed as a possible Triple-A postseason addition, but instead was told he was going to the major leagues.

The promotion came as Philadelphia sought additional catching depth during a playoff race while Mike Lieberthal was dealing with back spasms. Gradoville joined the Phillies for a 10-game road trip through Miami, Atlanta, and Houston, while Chris Coste and Carlos Ruiz split playing time behind the plate and Lieberthal recovered. Gradoville did not appear in a game during his time with Philadelphia. As the National League Wild Card race intensified and Lieberthal returned to action, the Phillies determined that they no longer needed to carry four catchers. On September 23, 2006, Gradoville was sent outright to Triple-A Scranton/Wilkes-Barre and removed from the roster.

Gradoville later said that he understood the circumstances that kept him out of the lineup, noting that the Phillies were in a close playoff race and that he was unlikely to receive “a token start or a token at-bat.” Although he never appeared in a Major League game, he described the experience positively. “I was there. I was really close. And those were the best two weeks of my playing career,” he said.

=== Post-Playing Career ===
In 2009, Gradoville served as the Bullpen Catcher for the Philadelphia Phillies and retired from professional baseball after the season.

He now resides in the Philadelphia area with his family and frequently attends Phillies Alumni events throughout the community.

== Phantom ballplayer recognition ==
Lahey, Toffey, Gradoville and Singer throwing out the first pitch on August 9, 2026.

In 2026, the Philadelphia Phillies honored Gradoville during Toyota Phillies Alumni Weekend. He threw out the first pitch with fellow Phillies phantom ballplayers, Tim Lahey, Jeff Singer, and Will Toffey who were honored as former players who reached the major leagues, wore a Phillies uniform, were active on the club's roster, but never appeared in a regular-season Major League Baseball game. The club described the ceremony as being inspired by the Moonlight Graham storyline from Field of Dreams movie in advance of the MLB at Field of Dreams game between the Phillies and Minnesota Twins on August 13th.
