= Morgan Russell (softball) =

American softball player and coach

Biographical details
- Born: November 24, 1989 (age 36); Austin, Texas, U.S.
- Education: Louisiana State University

Playing career
- 2009–2012: LSU
- Position: Catcher

Coaching career (HC unless noted)
- 2013: LSU (GA)
- 2014: Georgia Southern (assistant)

Morgan Shea Russell (born November 24, 1989) is an American softball coach and former player. She attended Edmond Santa Fe High School in Edmond, Oklahoma, graduating in 2008. She later attended Louisiana State University, where she played catcher on the LSU Tigers softball team. During her senior season in 2012, Russell led the Tigers to the 2012 Women's College World Series second round, where they fell to Arizona State, 6–0. Russell served as a graduate assistant coach for the Tigers in 2013 while graduating from LSU in May 2013 with degree in sports administration. She later served as an assistant softball coach at Georgia Southern University in 2014.
