= William Whalen =

William Whalen may refer to:

- William J. Whalen (1928–2008), American non-fiction religious writer
- William J. Whalen III (1940–2006), director of the United States National Park Service
- Jimmy Whalen (baseball) (William Lester Whalen, 1880–1915), American baseballer
