= Brewer Hicklen =

American baseball player (born 1996)

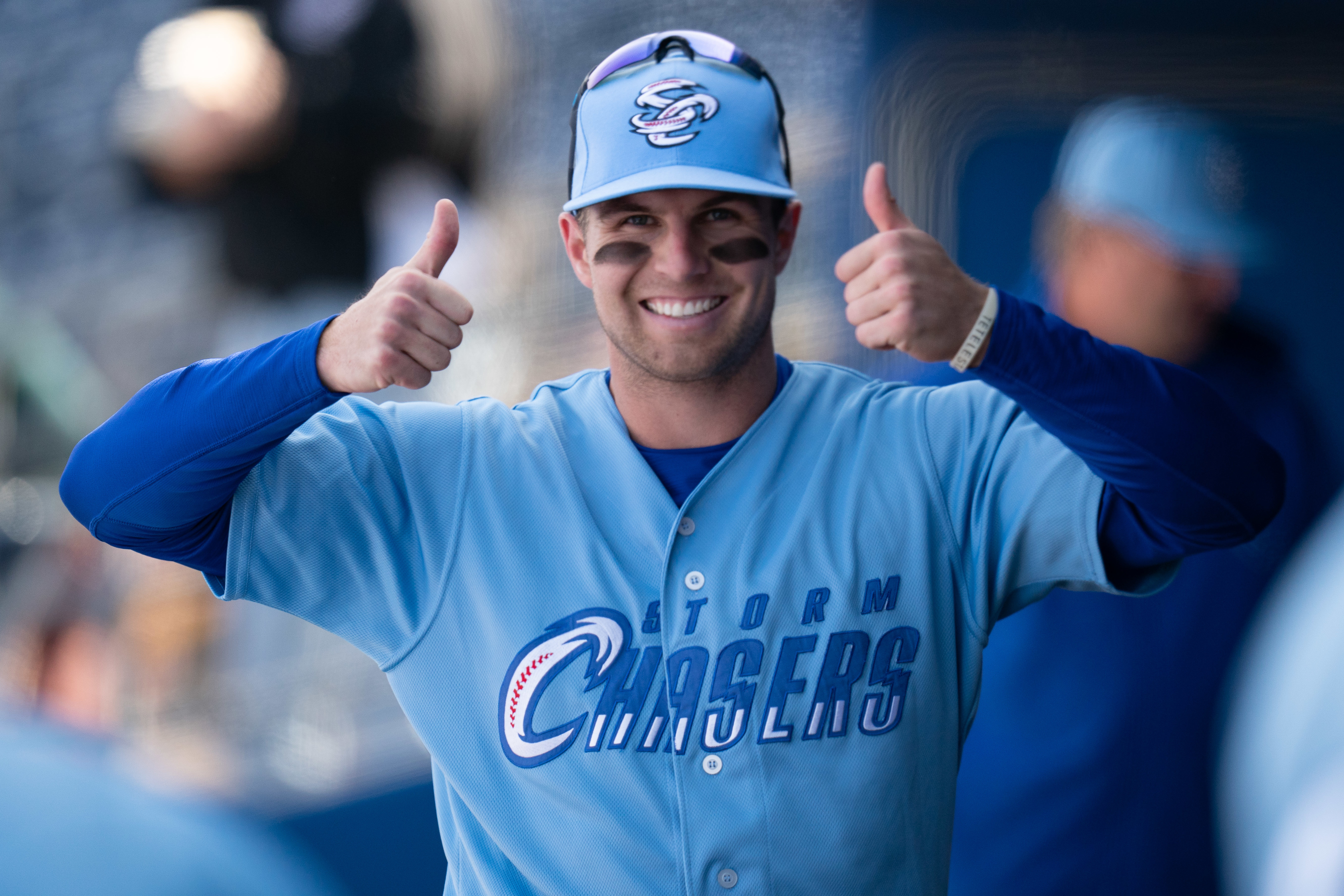
- Hicklen with the Omaha Storm Chasers in 2022

Atlanta Braves – No. 53
- Outfielder
- Born: February 9, 1996 (age 30); Huntsville, Alabama, U.S.
- Bats: Right Throws: Right

MLB debut
- May 26, 2022, for the Kansas City Royals

MLB statistics (through 2026 season)
- Batting average: .235
- Home runs: 0
- Runs batted in: 3
- Stats at Baseball Reference

Teams
- Kansas City Royals (2022); Milwaukee Brewers (2024); Detroit Tigers (2025); Atlanta Braves (2026–present)

Charles Brewer Hicklen (born February 9, 1996) is an American professional baseball outfielder for the Atlanta Braves of Major League Baseball (MLB). He has previously played in MLB for the Kansas City Royals, Milwaukee Brewers, and Detroit Tigers. Hicklen made his MLB debut in 2022.

== Amateur career ==
Hicklen graduated from Huntsville High School in Huntsville, Alabama. He played baseball as an outfielder and football as a quarterback.

Hicklen committed to attend the University of Alabama at Birmingham (UAB), hoping to play college baseball and college football for the UAB Blazers. He played as a wide receiver for the football team until UAB ended its football program in December 2014. He looked for other football opportunities, and while waiting for scholarship offers, his baseball offer from UAB was revoked. He agreed to walk on to the baseball team. He began to focus exclusively on baseball. He took a redshirt for the baseball team in 2015. In 2016, he batted .289 with three home runs, 21 runs batted in (RBIs), and 22 stolen bases. When the football team was resurrected in 2016, he rejoined the team.

== Professional career ==
=== Kansas City Royals ===
The Kansas City Royals selected Hicklen in the seventh round, with the 210th overall selection, of the 2017 MLB draft. He became the highest-selected player from UAB in the MLB draft. (Note: In the 2019 MLB draft, Graham Ashcraft was selected out of UAB in the sixth round.) After not making an Opening Day roster for a minor league team in Kansas City's farm system in 2018, he was assigned to the Lexington Legends of the Single–A South Atlantic League in April and was promoted to the Wilmington Blue Rocks of the High–A Carolina League in July. His .307 batting average and 29 stolen bases with Lexington led the team. Hicklen returned to Wilmington for the 2019 season. He did not play in a game in 2020 due to the cancellation of the minor league season because of the COVID-19 pandemic.

Hicklen played for the Northwest Arkansas Naturals of Double-A South in 2021. He began the 2022 season with the Omaha Storm Chasers of the Triple–A Pacific Coast League. He batted .266 with five home runs, 24 RBIs, and 11 stolen bases in 42 games. The Royals promoted Hicklen to the major leagues on May 26; he made his major league debut that night as the starting center fielder. He returned to the minor leagues on May 31 when Kyle Isbel was activated. Hicklen returned to the major leagues on July 14. He was returned to the minors on July 18. In the minor leagues in 2022, he batted .248/.348/.502 in 480 at bats, and was third in the minor leagues with 202 strikeouts.

Hicklen was assigned to Triple–A Omaha to begin the 2023 season. In 61 games, he batted .233/.338/.452 with 8 home runs, 29 RBI, and 15 stolen bases.

=== Philadelphia Phillies ===
On August 23, 2023, Hicklen was traded to the Philadelphia Phillies in exchange for cash considerations. In 11 games for the Triple–A Lehigh Valley IronPigs, he batted .250/.413/.472 with 2 home runs, 4 RBI, and 6 stolen bases. Hicklen elected free agency following the season on November 6.

=== Milwaukee Brewers ===
On November 28, 2023, Hicklen signed a minor league contract with the Milwaukee Brewers. The Brewers assigned Hicklen to the Triple–A Nashville Sounds for the start of the 2024 season. On July 15, the Brewers added Hicklen to their 40–man roster and optioned him back to Nashville. The Brewers promoted Hicklen to the major leagues on September 1. In three games for Milwaukee, he batted 0-for-5 with one stolen base.

The Brewers optioned Hicklen to Triple-A Nashville to begin the 2025 season. Hicklen was designated for assignment by the Brewers on March 27, 2025.

=== Detroit Tigers ===
On March 28, 2025, Hicklen was traded to the Detroit Tigers in exchange for cash considerations. He was assigned to the Triple-A Toledo Mudhens to start the season but was called up after the first week to replace an injured player. He was sent down two days later without appearing in a game for the Tigers. Hicklen was again called up on May 8 to start in the second game of a doubleheader against the Colorado Rockies, which was his Tigers debut. In the game, he recorded his first career hit, a single off of Tanner Gordon. Hicklen was designated for assignment by the Tigers on July 23.

=== Philadelphia Phillies (second stint) ===
On July 26, 2025, Hicklen was traded to the Philadelphia Phillies in exchange for cash considerations. In 32 appearances for the Triple-A Lehigh Valley IronPigs, he batted .218/.293/.437 with eight home runs, 25 RBI, and seven stolen bases. On September 16, Hicklen was designated for assignment following the promotion of Rafael Lantigua. He cleared waivers and was sent outright to Lehigh Valley on September 19. Hicklen elected free agency on November 6.

=== Atlanta Braves ===
On November 22, 2025, Hicklen signed a minor league contract with the Atlanta Braves. On June 16, 2026, the Braves added Hicklen to their 40-man roster and subsequently optioned him to the Triple-A Gwinnett Stripers.

== Personal life ==
During the offseasons, Hicklen hosts an annual baseball camp for children at an Alabama high school.
