= Phantom ballplayer =

Baseball concept

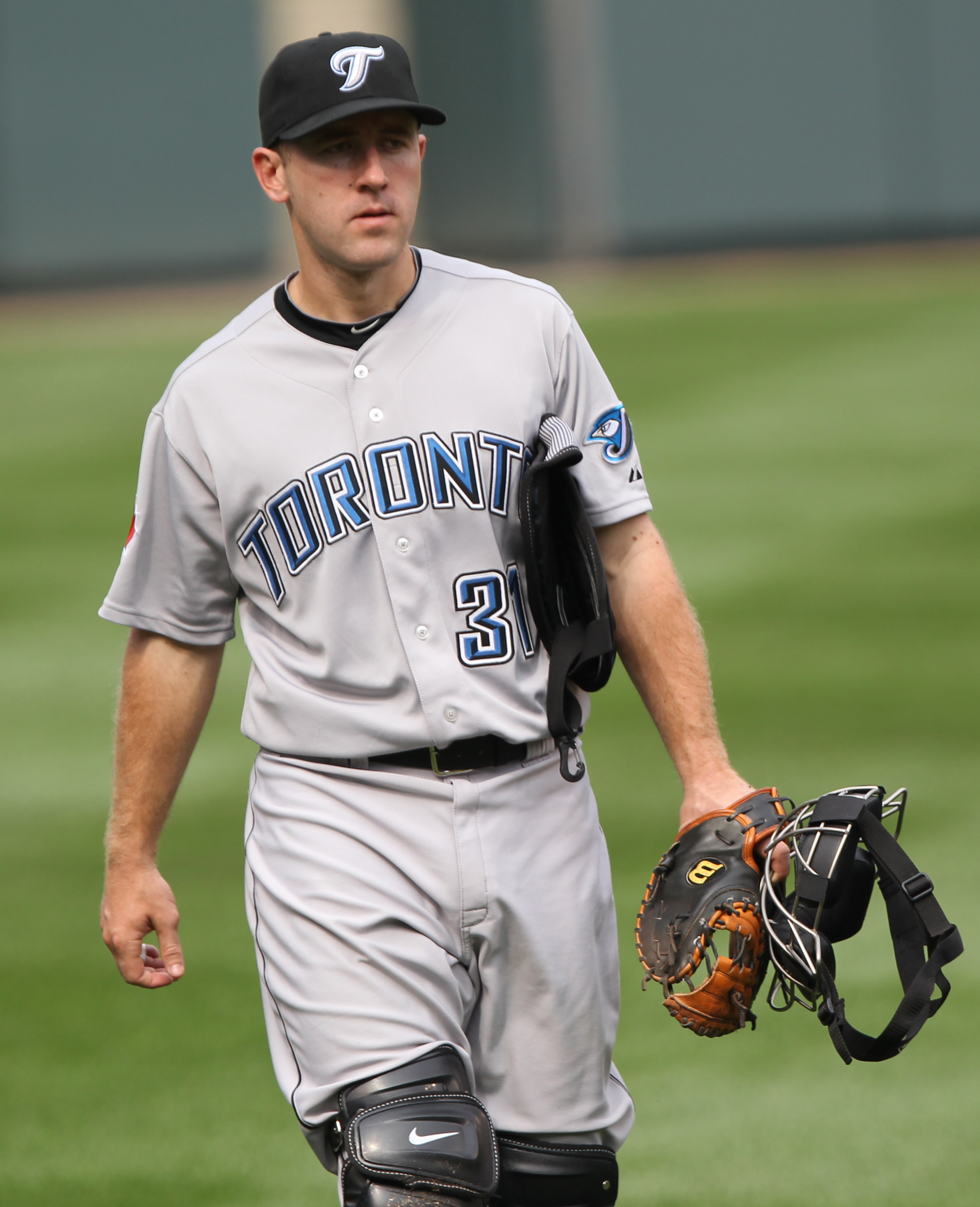
Brian Jeroloman spent a month with the 2011 Toronto Blue Jays without appearing in a game.

A phantom ballplayer is either a baseball player who is incorrectly listed in source materials as playing in a Major League Baseball (MLB) game, often the result of typographical or clerical errors, or a player who spent time on an MLB active roster without ever appearing in an MLB contest during his career. Most of the first form of phantom players date from the 19th or early 20th century, with at least one showing up as late as World War II.

A modern-day phantom ballplayer is generally caused by the player being removed from the active roster by a subsequent action (such as being optioned to a minor league team) or the team reaching the end of their season, and the player not having later opportunity to play in a major league game. Many of these phantom players were September call-ups in backup roles.

== Phantoms who never were ==
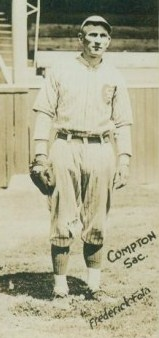
Pete Compton of the St. Louis Browns, now credited with the plate appearance of "Lou Proctor"

- Edward L. Thayer supposedly played one game for the 1876 New York Mutuals; he was listed in The Official Encyclopedia of Baseball as having been born in Mechanic Falls, Maine. The player was actually George Fair, who adopted a pseudonym that, coincidentally, resembled the name of then-12-year-old Ernest Lawrence Thayer, who went on to become a poet and write "Casey at the Bat." (Some 19th and early 20th century players sometimes played under assumed names in an attempt to circumvent contractual obligations with another club.)
- An outfielder named Turbot (no first name given) was listed in The Official Encyclopedia of Baseball as playing one game for the 1902 St. Louis Cardinals. In the 1971 anthology This Great Game, writer and humorist Roy Blount Jr. included him on his "all-time fish team" (as turbot is also the name of a fish) and bemoaned that Turbot had been dropped from the encyclopedia; "I don't know what happened to him, but we need him in the outfield."
- Lou Proctor was listed as playing one game for the 1912 St. Louis Browns, drawing a walk in his only plate appearance. He appeared in The Official Encyclopedia of Baseball as a pinch hitter named "L. Proctor". Research in the 1980s, however, revealed that the appearance belonged to the Browns' Pete Compton. According to legend, Proctor was a Western Union operator who inserted his name into the box score as a prank. However, whether Proctor existed—even as a prankish telegraph operator—is unknown.
- A catcher named Deniens (no first name given) was listed in The Official Encyclopedia of Baseball as having played one game for the 1914 Chicago Chi-Feds of the Federal League. Later research showed that the game was caught by the Chi-Feds third-string catcher Clem Clemens — historians reading a handwritten scorecard of the game had incorrectly deciphered "Clemens" as "Deniens".

== Real players who never played ==
Research by the Society for American Baseball Research (SABR) has identified over 1,400 players who appeared on major league rosters, but did not appear in a major league game, since 1884. A number of examples are presented here:

=== Pre-1950 ===
- The Sporting Life of February 24, 1906, reported that pitcher Jimmy Whalen signed a contract to the New York Highlanders, He was on the Highlanders roster at least through April 24, 1906, when his home in San Francisco burned down in a fire from the aftermath of the 1906 San Francisco earthquake. He was demoted to Montreal in May. Whalen never appeared in a major league game, although he won over 250 games in the minors.
- Pitcher Bill Stewart was with the 1919 Chicago White Sox, having been signed in December 1918, but he suffered an arm injury falling down a flight of stairs while working as a census taker, and was sent to the minor leagues in May 1919. It is unclear whether he was on the team's active roster. Stewart went on to be an umpire in the National League and an ice hockey referee in the NHL.
- First baseman Jeff Jones of Harvard was briefly with the 1920 Philadelphia Athletics in early July, but did not play before being assigned to the minor leagues. He was recalled by the A's in late July, but again did not make a major-league appearance. As with several other players of this era, it is not established if Jones was on the A's active roster during the season.
- Outfielder Lou Almada made the major league roster of the 1927 New York Giants out of spring training, but the Giants did not use him before they optioned him to the minor leagues. In 1933, his brother Mel Almada became the first Mexican to play in the majors.
- Minor league pitching legend Jake Levy was reported in at least one contemporary account to have signed with the 1927 New York Giants in mid-September, without getting into a game. Peter and Joachim Horvitz's The Big Book of Jewish Baseball list Levy's stint on the Giants bench as having occurred in 1932. However, whether Levy spent any time at all on a Giants' active roster is a matter of dispute.
- Al Olsen is an unusual example of a verifiable real-life person who did not play in the major leagues, but was included in official major league records for many years. Olsen, a career minor league pitcher, was credited as appearing in the first game of a doubleheader on May 16, 1943, as a pinch hitter (walking, and then stealing a base) for the Boston Red Sox against the Chicago White Sox. However, research by SABR in the 1980s showed that while Olsen had been with the 1943 Boston Red Sox during spring training, he was sent to San Diego of the Pacific Coast League before the 1943 season began. Olsen pitched on May 15 for San Diego, and given wartime travel restrictions, could not have arrived in Chicago for the game the following day. Olsen himself said, "It wasn't me. I was a left-handed pitcher. I couldn't hit my hat. Besides, I never played a game in the major leagues." The pinch hitting appearance probably, but not definitely, belongs to Leon Culberson; it also could have been Johnny Lazor, who wore uniform number 14, the same number Olsen wore in spring training. Official records now credit Culberson with the walk and stolen base—though Culberson himself swore he did not play in what would have been his major league debut game (he was the starting center fielder in the second game of the doubleheader, thus his debut date is not in question).

=== 1950s ===
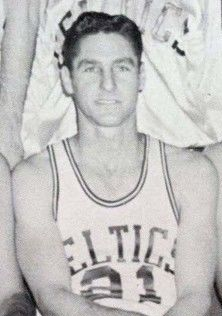
Bill Sharman, who was briefly on the roster of the 1951 Brooklyn Dodgers

- Outfielder Bill Sharman spent time on the roster of the 1951 Brooklyn Dodgers when he was called up in mid-September; he did not appear in a game. Sharman is often cited as the only player to be ejected from an MLB game without playing in one, when umpire Frank Dascoli cleared the entire Dodgers bench for arguing with a call at home plate on September 27, 1951. However, Sharman was not ejected; those who had to leave the bench were still eligible to be brought into the game. Sharman is far more notable as a professional basketball player and coach than as a baseball player; he is one of the few individuals to be inducted into the Naismith Memorial Basketball Hall of Fame as both a player and a coach.
- Bruce Swango was a high school pitcher signed by Paul Richards for the Baltimore Orioles for $36,000 in 1955. He was required to be placed on the Orioles' 25-player active roster because of the bonus rule at the time. He never appeared in an MLB game during his two months with the ballclub before being released. He spent the remainder of his professional baseball career in the minors.

=== 1960s ===
- The 1964 New York Yankees named middle infielder Chet Trail their "designated player" for the season under baseball's pre-draft era bonus rule, which allowed him to be assigned to a minor league club while still counting against (and being considered part of) the team's 25-man active roster. Additionally, Commissioner of Baseball Ford Frick ruled that Trail was eligible for the Yankees' 1964 World Series roster. However, Trail never played in an MLB game. Trail is the only player to have appeared on a World Series eligibility list without ever appearing in a major league game.
- Infielder Ike Futch was added to the active roster of the 1966 Houston Astros, after Joe Morgan suffered a broken kneecap on June 25—however, Futch himself sustained a knee injury in a Triple-A game on June 26, which ended his season.
- Pitcher Maurice "Moe" Ogier was on the Opening Day roster for the 1968 Minnesota Twins, but he did not get into a game and was optioned to the Twins' farm team in Charlotte in late April to make room for Jim Kaat, who had injured his elbow in his final start of the 1967 season and was coming off the disabled list. Ogier had an ailing shoulder, which may have been the reason he did not get into a game.

=== 1970s ===
- Catcher-outfielder Lee Robinson did not appear in an MLB game, despite spending nearly two months on the roster of the 1974 Los Angeles Dodgers. He was recalled from the Triple-A Albuquerque Dukes on May 11 to replace pitcher Greg Shanahan, and was returned to Albuquerque on July 3 when the Dodgers called up Rick Rhoden. Robinson was later voted $2,000 in World Series money by his teammates.
- First baseman Ed Kurpiel was a September call-up for the 1974 St. Louis Cardinals, but did not appear in a game.
- Pitcher Davis May was called up from Tacoma by the 1977 Minnesota Twins, along with fellow pitcher Jeff Holly, on April 25 to replace Mike Pazik and Don Carrithers, who had been seriously injured in a car accident early that morning. Holly pitched for the Twins, but May was sent back to Tacoma on May 16 to make room for Glenn Adams, who was returning from the disabled list. May was not used (or even asked to warm up) by Twins manager Gene Mauch during the time he was on the active roster.
- In September 1977, no fewer than three ballplayers who never played in a major league game served a couple of weeks' time on major league rosters, all of them pitchers: Tom McGough of the Cleveland Indians, Pat Cristelli of the California Angels, and Ed Ricks of the New York Yankees. (Scott McGough, the son of Tom McGough, pitched in six games for the 2015 Miami Marlins, and then made it back to the majors with the 2023 Arizona Diamondbacks.)
- Catcher Harry Saferight was a September call-up for the 1979 Pittsburgh Pirates, but he failed to appear in a game. He was the on-deck batter on three different occasions, but, each time, the batter ahead of him made the final out of the inning. Fellow call-up Gary Hargis narrowly avoided phantom status by making a single MLB appearance.

=== 1980s ===
- The 1983 Kansas City Royals briefly called up two catchers to back up regular backstop John Wathan; Duane Dewey was on the roster from May 16 to June 1, while Russ Stephans spent time on the roster from June 29 to July 5; neither made an MLB appearance.
- Pitcher Mark Leonette was called up by the 1987 Chicago Cubs on July 2, and was sent down on July 6 without making an appearance in a game. He wore number 32 while with the club.
- Infielder Bill Merrifield spent two days on the roster of the 1987 Pittsburgh Pirates in September, but did not appear in a game before being sent to the Florida Instructional League. His son Whit Merrifield made his major league debut with the 2016 Kansas City Royals.
- Pitcher Joe Law spent four days on the active roster of the 1988 Oakland Athletics without making an appearance. He was first called up on July 4, and deactivated after the first game of a doubleheader on July 5. He subsequently was called up on August 8, and sent back down on August 10. His son Derek Law made his major-league debut with the 2016 San Francisco Giants.

=== 1990s ===
- Infielder Armando Moreno was added to the 1990 Pittsburgh Pirates roster on August 3, and sent back to Triple-A two days later, without appearing in a game.
- Outfielder-first baseman Terrel Hansen was on the active roster for the 1992 New York Mets for two games, April 30 and May 1, without making an appearance.
- Outfielder Bruce Dostal spent four games on active roster of the 1994 Baltimore Orioles; he was called up on June 10, then designated for assignment on June 14. On two occasions, manager Johnny Oates told Dostal he would pinch run if designated hitter Harold Baines reached base; both times, Baines was retired.
- Infielder Joel Chimelis was called up by the 1995 San Francisco Giants on June 4 to replace injured third baseman Matt Williams, who had broken a bone in his foot. Chimelis had been a replacement player during spring training that year, and other Giants players did not like adding a strikebreaker on the team. After a threat of player revolt, the Giants sent him back to the minor leagues two days later, without appearing in a major league game. He was not called up to the major leagues again.
- Pitcher Jesus Martínez, the younger brother of Pedro and Ramón, was added to the active roster of the 1996 Los Angeles Dodgers on September 2 but did not appear in a game.

=== 2000s ===
- Outfielder Luke Wilcox was briefly called up by the 2000 New York Yankees, July 13–16, but did not appear in a game. He wore number 50 with the Yankees.
- Catcher César King spent five days on the 2001 Kansas City Royals active roster, May 19–23, without making an appearance.
- Pitcher Jeff Urban was on the 2003 San Francisco Giants active roster on April 26–30 and again on August 1–2. He did not make an appearance during either stint.
- Catcher David Parrish, son of Tiger great Lance Parrish, was called up by the 2004 New York Yankees for three days without making an appearance, after regular catcher Jorge Posada was hit in the face with a ball during a game. Parrish wore number 57 during his short stint as a Yankee.
- Pitcher Cory Morris was on the active roster of the 2006 Baltimore Orioles on April 9–12, without making an appearance.
- Catcher Tim Gradoville was on the 2006 Philadelphia Phillies active roster for 16 days in September without making an appearance as an emergency back up for Mike Lieberthal.
- Pitcher Tim Lahey was on the active roster of the 2008 Philadelphia Phillies for the first six days of the season without making an appearance. Lahey spent his entire six-year minor league career pitching for the Minnesota Twins organization. However, in a five-month period from December 2007 to April 2008, he was selected by the Tampa Bay Rays in the Rule 5 draft, sold by the Rays to the Chicago Cubs, released by the Cubs, signed by the Phillies (where he was briefly on their active roster), and then returned to the Twins under conditions of the Rule 5 draft. Lahey managed to do all this without throwing a regular season pitch for anyone other than Minnesota farm teams.
- Pitcher Luis Muñoz spent two games on the active roster of the 2008 Pittsburgh Pirates in July without making an appearance. It appeared likely he wouldn’t appear even before he arrived, with Pirates general manager Neal Huntington saying of his call-up to the majors: "I would not anticipate Luis being here for an extended period of time. It was a step short of desperation." Two days after his arrival, Munoz was removed from the Pirates roster and designated for assignment. He was eventually sent to the farm system of the Seattle Mariners.

=== 2010s ===
- Pitcher Tom Cochran was on the active roster of the 2011 Cincinnati Reds between May 29 and 31, before being optioned back down to Triple–A Louisville.
- Catcher José Yépez was called up by the 2011 Seattle Mariners on June 29, then designated for assignment on July 7, without making an appearance in a game. He wore number 35 while with the Mariners.
- Pitcher Cody Scarpetta was called up by the Milwaukee Brewers on July 10, 2011, and sent back down to Double-A Huntsville the next day.
- Catcher Brian Jeroloman was on the active roster of the 2011 Toronto Blue Jays for the final 37 days of the season without playing in a game.
- Pitcher Jason Rice was on the active roster of the 2011 Oakland Athletics beginning on September 1, after being acquired from the Boston Red Sox organization. However, he was claimed off of waivers by Cleveland on September 6 and was assigned to the Triple-A Columbus Clippers without making a major league appearance.
- Pitcher Michael Antonini was on the active roster of the 2012 Los Angeles Dodgers twice during the season, April 24–27 and May 28–29, but did not appear in a game either time.
- Pitcher Frank De Los Santos was on the active roster of the 2014 Chicago White Sox on May 3–4, without making an appearance.
- Pitcher Tim Berry was promoted to the 2014 Baltimore Orioles active roster on June 6, but was sent down the next day without having appeared in a game.
- Pitcher Caleb Clay was promoted to the major leagues by the Los Angeles Angels on August 10, 2014. He went unused out of the bullpen and was optioned to Triple–A on August 12. He was later removed from the 40–man roster and stepped away from baseball following the 2015 season.
- Outfielder Taylor Dugas was on the 2015 New York Yankees active roster on July 1–3, without making an appearance.
- Relief pitcher Chris Jones was called up by the 2016 Los Angeles Angels on May 30, and demoted two days later, without appearing.

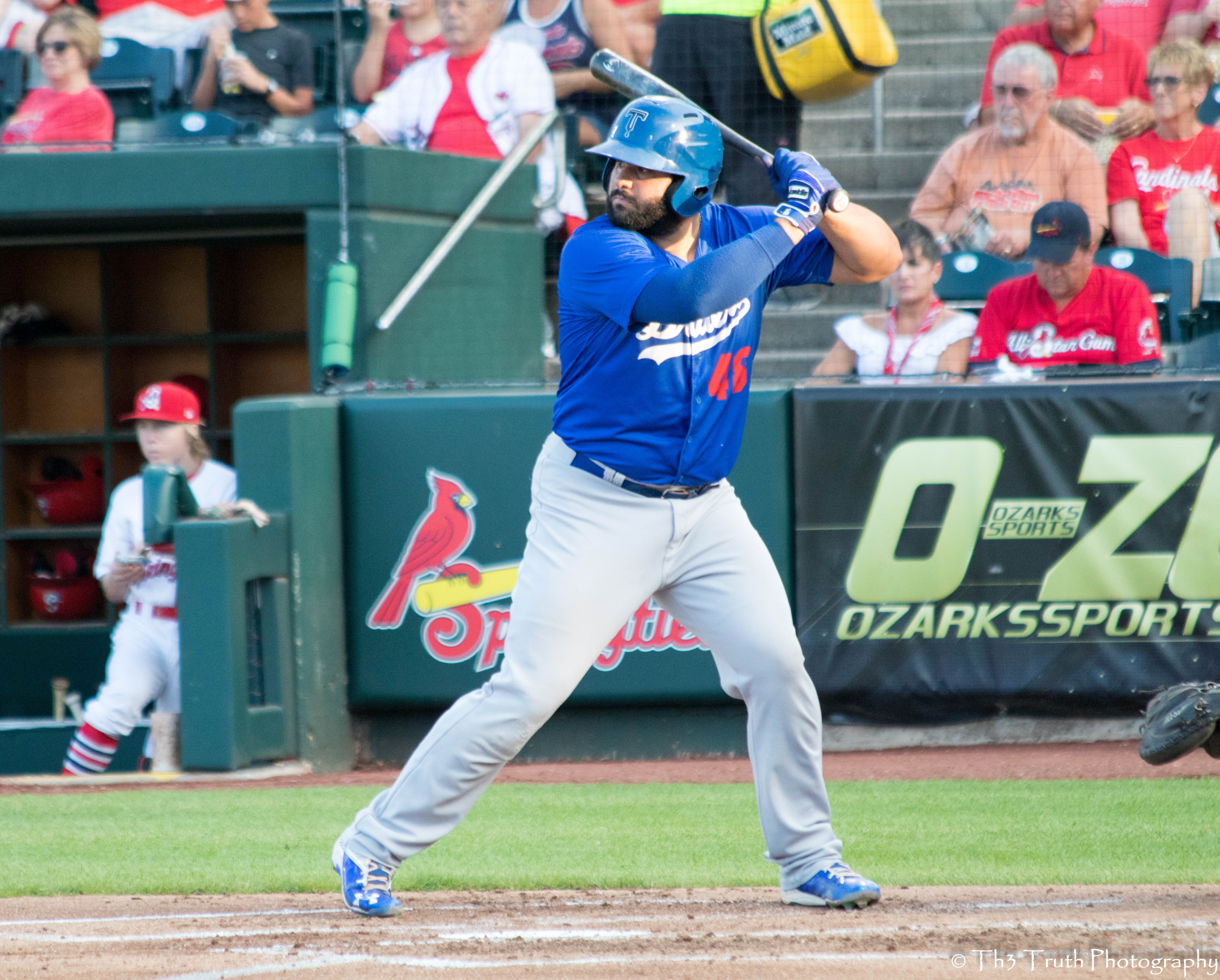
Shawn Zarraga was briefly on the active roster of the Los Angeles Dodgers in 2016.

- Outfielder Ronnier Mustelier was promoted to the major leagues by the 2016 Atlanta Braves on July 3, and demoted the next day, without playing. He was on the Braves' roster due to MLB allowing both teams in the Fort Bragg Game to have a 26th player active.
- Catcher Shawn Zarraga was on the active roster of the 2016 Los Angeles Dodgers on August 25–26, but did not appear.
- Pitcher Ryan Bollinger† was promoted to the major leagues twice by the 2018 New York Yankees, once on May 23, but was demoted the next day without appearing in the majors, and again on July 31, but he was again optioned down the next day without playing.
- Pitcher Clayton Blackburn was called up to the major leagues twice, once in 2016 with the San Francisco Giants and another time in 2017 with the Texas Rangers, without getting into a game. Blackburn, who officially retired from baseball in 2019, is the only known phantom to have been on the active roster of more than one major league team without ever getting into a game.
- Outfielder Eliezer Álvarez was promoted to the major leagues by the 2018 Texas Rangers on May 7, and demoted the next day.
- Pitcher Bo Takahashi† was promoted to the major leagues by the 2019 Arizona Diamondbacks on August 18, 2019, but was optioned down on August 20 without appearing in a game. Takahashi was removed from the Diamondbacks 40-man roster on October 27, 2020. He went on to play in the KBO League and Nippon Professional Baseball (NPB).

=== 2020s ===
Player	Position	Team	Days on roster	Added to roster	Removed from roster	Current status	Notes
Jeison Guzmán	IF	Kansas City Royals	3	August 11, 2020	August 14, 2020	Active	
Trey Supak	P	Milwaukee Brewers	1	August 31, 2020	September 1, 2020	Active	
Jasseel De La Cruz	P	Atlanta Braves	3	September 15, 2020 ----- May 8, 2021	September 16, 2020 ----- May 10, 2021	Active	Two separate stints on the Atlanta Braves roster.
Steven Fuentes	P	Washington Nationals	10	April 20, 2021	April 30, 2021	Retired	
Corey Bird	OF	Miami Marlins	2	July 28, 2021	July 30, 2021	Retired	
Gianpaul González	C	Cleveland Indians	2	August 31, 2021	September 2, 2021	Retired	
Miguel Romero	P	Oakland Athletics	13	September 8, 2021	September 21, 2021	Active	
Jeff Singer	P	Philadelphia Phillies	1	April 12, 2022	April 13, 2022	Retired	
Donovan Casey	OF	Washington Nationals	5	April 15, 2022	April 20, 2022	Active	
Ronaldo Hernández	C	Boston Red Sox	2	April 19, 2022 ----- August 1, 2022	April 20, 2022 ----- August 2, 2022	Active	Two separate stints on the Boston Red Sox roster.
Alex Hall	C	Milwaukee Brewers	1	June 2, 2022	June 3, 2022	Active	Emergency call-up, as primary catcher Omar Narváez tested positive for COVID-19 two hours before the Brewers' game. Hall played for the closest minor league affiliate to the Brewers, the Wisconsin Timber Rattlers.
Will Toffey	IF	Philadelphia Phillies	1	July 13, 2022	July 14, 2022	Retired	
Carlos Espinal	P	New York Yankees	1	August 1, 2022	August 2, 2022	Active	
Parker Bugg	P	Miami Marlins	2	August 14, 2022	August 16, 2022	Retired	
Connor Grey	P	New York Mets	5	August 22, 2022	August 27, 2022	Active	
Chris Muller	P	Tampa Bay Rays	3	May 12, 2023	May 15, 2023	Active	.
Norwith Gudiño	P	Boston Red Sox	1	July 22, 2023	July 23, 2023	Active	27th man for the team's doubleheader.
Nick Raposo	C	St. Louis Cardinals	2	June 22, 2024	June 24, 2024	Active	
Jacob Bosiokovic	P	St. Louis Cardinals	5	June 30, 2024	July 5, 2024	Retired	
Sam Benschoter	P	Cincinnati Reds	8	July 1, 2025 ----- August 8, 2025	July 4, 2025 ----- August 13, 2025	Active	Two separate stints on the Cincinnati Reds roster.
Houston Roth	P	Baltimore Orioles	6	July 29, 2025	August 4, 2025	Active	
Rafael Lantigua	IF	Philadelphia Phillies	3	September 16, 2025	September 19, 2025	Active	
Jhancarlos Lara	P	Atlanta Braves	3	September 19, 2025	September 22, 2025	Active	
Jesús Valdez	IF	Arizona Diamondbacks	1	April 26, 2026	April 27, 2026	Active	27th man for a doubleheader against the Padres in the MLB Mexico City Series.
Stephen Jones	P	Miami Marlins	1	May 7, 2026	May 8, 2026	Active	
Robinson Ortiz	P	Seattle Mariners	2	May 18, 2026	May 20, 2026	Active	
Curtis Washington Jr.	OF	Seattle Mariners	1	June 16, 2026	June 17, 2026	Active	
Dan Hammer	P	New York Mets	1	July 9, 2026	July 10, 2026	Active	
Bryce Conley	P	New York Mets	2	August 2, 2026	August 4, 2026	Active	
Zach Morgan	C	San Francisco Giants	8	August 10, 2026 ----- September 1, 2026	August 11, 2026 ----- September 8, 2026	Active	Two separate stints on the San Francisco Giants roster.

NOTE: A designation of "Active" denotes an active professional baseball player, currently playing in the minors or in another professional baseball organization, who could lose phantom status if he returns to the major leagues and appears in a game.

== Honorable mentions ==
Baseball Reference maintains lists of players who have appeared in only a single major league game; as of June 2026, there are more than 1,400 players, including more than 700 pitchers, listed.

Other players who had notable experiences similar to phantom ballplayers include:

=== Not officially on a major-league roster ===
- Journalist Arthur "Bugs" Baer claimed that he was on the Detroit Tigers team for their game of May 18, 1912, against the Philadelphia Athletics, but wasn't put in the game. Most of the Tigers roster for that game consisted of players who were playing their first and only major league game: the Tigers had gone on strike, and an emergency squad of replacements had been hastily recruited from local amateurs, along with Tigers coaches, to allow the Tigers to field a team. No independent attribution exists regarding Baer's claim, which was made more than four decades after the game was played.
- Pitcher Brian Mazone was to start a game for the 2006 Philadelphia Phillies on September 5, but the game was rained out and the Phillies did not activate him to their roster. He spent the rest of his career, which ended in 2010, in the minors. "That's a tough thing to shake", Mazone said. "I was getting called up by the Phillies in 2006 to make a start [replacing Randy Wolf], and the game got rained out and they sent me back down without activating me. Randy came up to me here and apologized. Not that he did anything wrong, he just felt bad."

=== Passing phantoms ===
Some players have gone years between first being listed on a major-league active roster without playing (thus becoming phantoms), and eventually appearing in a major-league game (thus losing phantom status). Examples include:

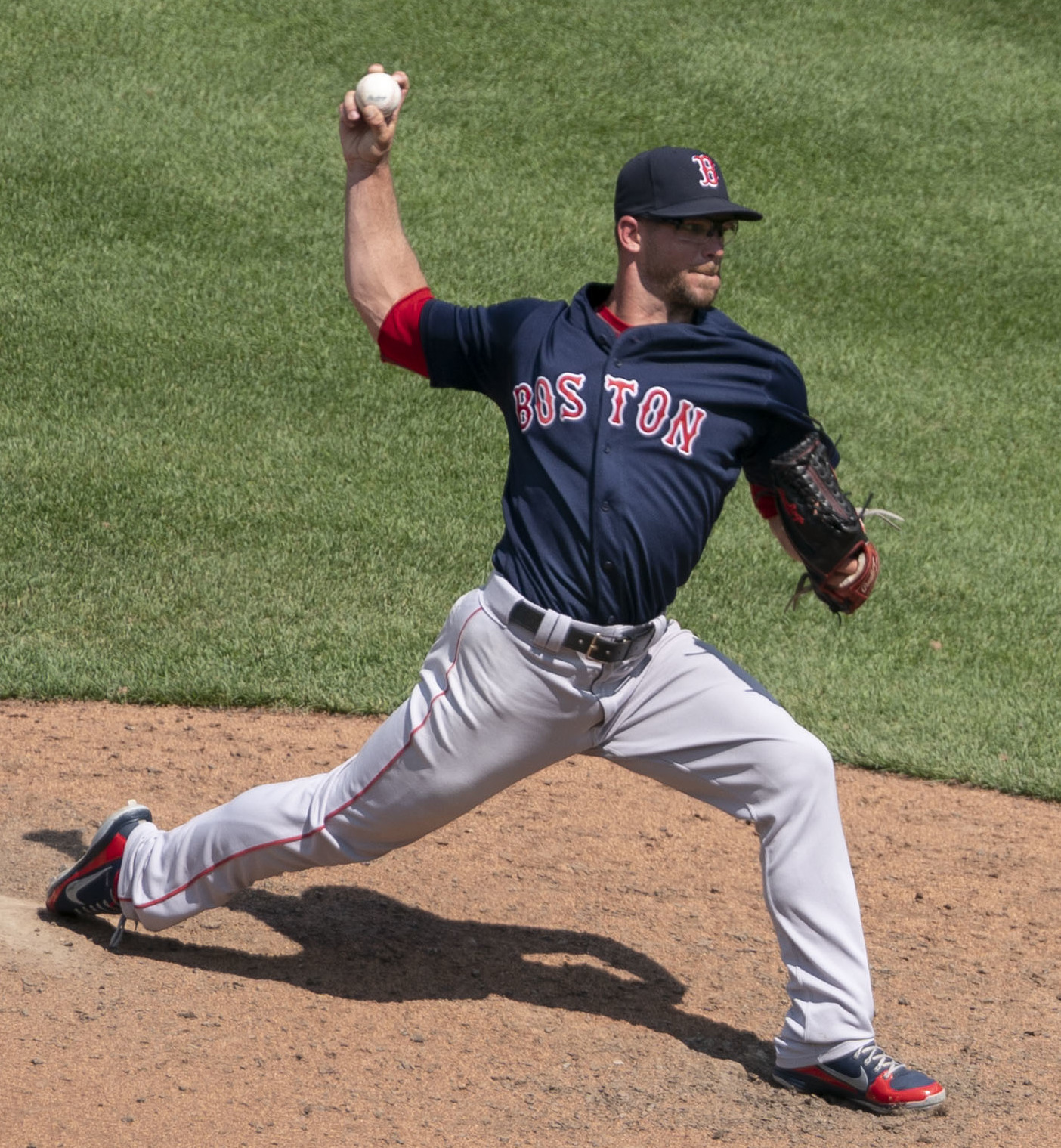
Marcus Walden was first listed on a major-league active roster in April 2014, but did not make his MLB debut until April 2018.

- Pitcher Johnny Niggeling made the 1932 Opening Day roster of the Pittsburgh Pirates, but, before appearing in any games, suffered a season-ending acute gastric hemorrhage during the team's initial road trip. After pitching in the minors from 1933 through 1937, he made his major-league debut on April 30, 1938, for the Boston Bees (as the Braves were known back then).
- Pitcher Jorge Comellas was promoted by the Washington Senators in September 1937 but did not appear in any games before the season ended. After pitching in the minors for seven additional seasons, he made the 1945 Opening Day roster of the Chicago Cubs and made his major-league debut on April 19.
- Pitcher Marcus Walden was promoted by the Toronto Blue Jays in April 2014 but did not appear in a game during his five-day stint. In 2018, he made the Opening Day roster of the Boston Red Sox and made his MLB debut on April 1.
- Pitcher Ryne Harper was promoted by the Seattle Mariners in May 2017 but did not appear in any games before being optioned back to the minor leagues. He made the 2019 Opening Day roster of the Minnesota Twins and made his MLB debut on March 31.
- Pitcher Daniel Camarena was promoted to the major leagues by the 2019 New York Yankees on July 6, 2019, but was optioned down the next day without appearing in a game. During the 2021 season, his contract was promoted by the San Diego Padres and he made his MLB debut on June 19.
- Pitcher Domingo Acevedo was called up to the major leagues on July 21, 2018, for the 2018 New York Yankees, but was sent down to the minor leagues hours later without appearing in a major league game. Acevedo was removed from the Yankees' 40-man roster after the 2018 season. On June 21, 2021, his contract was purchased by the Oakland Athletics and he made his MLB debut.
- Infielder Drew Maggi was promoted to the major leagues by the Minnesota Twins on September 18, 2021, but was optioned down on September 20 without appearing in a game. He eventually made his MLB debut on April 26, 2023, with the Pittsburgh Pirates.

=== Rookie cards ===
Makers of baseball cards have issued major league rookie cards featuring some players who never actually played in MLB. Two known examples are listed below. Starting in 2005, the Major League Baseball Players Association (MLBPA) required card manufacturers to limit rookie cards to players already added to an MLB active roster, or players who appeared in an MLB game during the prior season. Note that card makers also issue cards of "future stars", "top prospects", or similar wording, which are not rookie cards and are speculative in nature.

- Catcher George Pena was featured on a 1973 Topps rookie card, along with Sergio Robles and Rick Stelmaszek. Pena played 740 games at the Triple-A level during his professional career, but never played in MLB.
- Pitcher Juan Veintidós was featured on a 1975 Topps rookie card, along with John Denny, Rawly Eastwick and Jim Kern. Veintidós pitched 89 games in Triple-A during his professional career, but never played in MLB.

=== Special circumstances ===
- Pitcher John Hardin Oldham warmed up in the bullpen multiple times during the 1956 Cincinnati Redlegs but was never called in to pitch. He did get to appear as a pinch runner on September 2, for Ted Kluszewski, who had singled as a pinch hitter. At the end of the inning, Oldham was replaced on defense by Rocky Bridges.
- Pitcher Larry Yount, older brother of Hall of Famer Robin Yount, suffered an injury while throwing warmup pitches after being summoned as a reliever during a September 15 game for the 1971 Houston Astros. He did not face a batter and did not appear in any other major-league game. Under baseball rules, Larry Yount is credited with an appearance in that game because he had been announced, despite not actually playing in the game.
- Infielder Mark Kiger never appeared in a major-league regular season game, but he holds the distinction of being the only player whose major-league career consists only of postseason games. Kiger was activated by the 2006 Oakland Athletics for the ALCS due to an injury to Mark Ellis. Kiger made two one-inning defensive appearances during the series, without having a plate appearance, and without ever playing in another major-league game. The only players to have made their major-league debuts in the postseason are Kiger, Bug Holliday in the 1885 World Series, Adalberto Mondesí in the 2015 World Series, Alex Kirilloff in the 2020 American League Wild Card Series, Ryan Weathers in the 2020 National League Division Series, Shane McClanahan in the 2020 American League Division Series, and Chase DeLauter in the 2025 American League Wild Card Series; the remaining six later played in regular-season major-league games.

== See also ==
- Sidd Finch, a fictitious pitcher
- Taro Tsujimoto, a fictitious ice hockey player
