= Joel Chimelis =

American baseball player

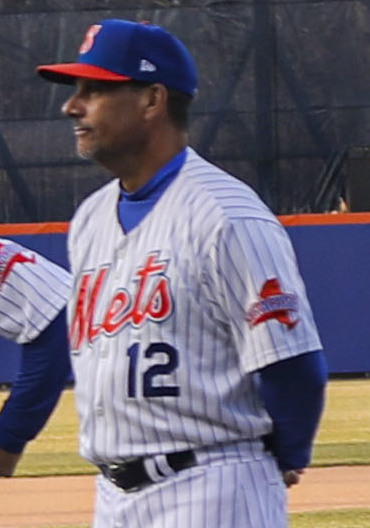
- Chimelis with the Syracuse Mets in 2022
- Infielder
- Born: July 27, 1967 (age 59); Brooklyn, New York, U.S.
- Batted: Right Threw: Right

Professional debut
- CPBL: 1997, for the Brother Elephants
- KBO: April 11, 1998, for the Hanwha Eagles

Last appearance
- CPBL: 1997, for the Brother Eagles
- KBO: September 23, 1998, for the Hanwha Eagles

CPBL statistics
- Batting average: .334
- Home runs: 7
- Runs batted in: 42

KBO statistics
- Batting average: .279
- Home runs: 17
- Runs batted in: 63
- Stats at Baseball Reference

Teams
- Brother Elephants (1997); Hanwha Eagles (1998)

Joel Chimelis (born July 27, 1967) is an American minor league baseball hitting coach for the Rocket City Trash Pandas and a former professional baseball infielder. Although he never played in Major League Baseball, he was a phantom ballplayer, being called up to the San Francisco Giants in June 1995 and sent down without playing in a game, due to working as a replacement player that spring. He played for the Hanwha Eagles of the Korea Baseball Organization in 1998 and also played in the Mexican League and Chinese Professional Baseball League in his 13-year playing career. He started his coaching career in 2004 and has been a hitting coach in the minors for several MLB teams.

== Early life and education ==
A native of Puerto Rico, Chimelis grew up in Brooklyn, New York. He graduated from Eastern District High School in Brooklyn. He attended Howard College in Big Spring, Texas and also attended the University of Texas, where he played baseball on the 1988 team and was named to the 1988 NCAA Central Region team.

== Early career ==
In early June 1988, Chimelis was drafted as a shortstop by the Oakland Athletics in the 11th round of the major league draft and sent to their Southern Oregon A's rookie-league minor league team in Medford, Oregon for the remainder of the 1988 season. Chimelis then was promoted to play for the Modesto Athletics Single-A minor league team in 1989 and 1990.

Chimelis then played for the minor league Shreveport Captains, a Double-A minor league team in the San Francisco Giants organization, in 1992, 1993, and 1994, and also played for the Giants' Triple-A minor league team, the Phoenix Firebirds, in 1992 and 1993.

== Replacement player and phantom ballplayer ==
While major league players were on strike during spring training in 1995, Chimelis agreed to take the field as part of the San Francisco Giants' replacement team. Once the strike ended, Chimelis went to Triple-A Phoenix minor league club.

On June 4, 1995, the Giants called up Chimelis to their major league roster to replace the injured infielder Matt Williams, who had broken a bone in his foot. Although several other major league teams had called up former replacement players, the Giants hadn't done so yet, and San Francisco players grumbled about the idea of welcoming a strikebreaker on the team. As a result, Chimelis, who had been hitting .294 at Phoenix, was treated as an outcast by Giants players, who held a players-only meeting at which they excluded Chimelis. "I never associated with a replacement player, and I wasn't about to now", Giants first baseman Mark Carreon told the San Francisco Chronicle. "A lot of us for eight months made sacrifices. I'm sure [Chimelis]'s a great guy, but we stood for something."

After a threat of player revolt, the Giants sent Chimelis back down to the minor leagues just two days later, on June 6, without Chimelis ever having appeared in a major league game, making him a phantom ballplayer. "They told me they would get me a flight out the next morning", Chimelis told the Daily Press (Virginia) in August 1996. "But I said, 'The hell with that. I'll go right now.' Why stay when you aren't happy and you aren't wanted? It's hard not to be angry, but there are two ways you can react to that anger. You can cry about it and dig yourself a hole, or you can build from it. All I did was try to support my family. Now I'm just trying to play baseball and do my job." Chimelis was never called back up to the major leagues again and finished his season in Phoenix. He was released by the Giants in early September 1995.

== Later career ==
In 1996, Chimelis started the season with the Guerreros de Oaxaca in the Mexican League. On July 26, 1996, he was signed by the Norfolk Tides, the Triple-A minor league club for the New York Mets, and spent the balance of the season there. In 1997, Chimelis played for the Brother Elephants of CPBL in Taiwan. In 1998, Chimelis played for the Hanwha Eagles in South Korea.

Chimelis played in the Mexican League in 2000 for the Tecolotes de los Dos Laredo. In 2001, Chimelis played in the Mexican League and for the Quebec Capitales in the independent Northern League. He played a stint in Puerto Rico during the winter of 2002, then returned to the Tecolotes later that year, but retired in 2003.

== Coaching career ==
In 2004 and 2005, Chimelis was the hitting coach for the Single-A Savannah Sand Gnats minor league team in the Washington Nationals organization.

In January 2006, the Houston Astros announced that Chimelis would become the hitting coach for the Tri-City ValleyCats, who play a short season in the New York–Penn League. Chimelis continued in that role through the 2010 season. In 2011, Chimelis served as the hitting coach for the Astros' Class A Lexington Legends team. In 2012, Chimelis served as the hitting coach for the Astros' Class AA Corpus Christi Hooks team, and then served as the hitting coach for the Quad Cities River Bandits, the Astros' low-A affiliate in the Midwest League.

Chimelis was the hitting coach for the Las Vegas 51s of the New York Mets organization for the 2018 season and continued his role with the Mets’ Triple-A team when it moved to Syracuse in 2019. He joined the Los Angeles Angels organization in 2023, coaching for the Triple-A Salt Lake Bees for one season before moving to the Double-A Rocket City Trash Pandas.

In 2026, Chimelis was named as the hitting coach for the FCL Phillies the rookie-level affiliate of the Philadelphia Phillies.
