= Houston Roth =

Free agent
- Pitcher
- Born: March 9, 1998 (age 28); Oxford, Mississippi, U.S.
- Bats: Right Throws: Right

Houston T. Roth (born March 9, 1998) is an American professional baseball pitcher who is a free agent. Roth is currently a phantom ballplayer, having spent six days on the active roster of the Baltimore Orioles without making an appearance.

== Amateur career ==
Roth attended Oxford High School and played college baseball at the University of Mississippi. In 2018, he played collegiate summer baseball with the Hyannis Harbor Hawks of the Cape Cod Baseball League. In his junior year at Ole Miss, Roth made four starts with a 1-1 record along with a 3.67 ERA and 47 strikeouts.

== Professional career ==
Roth was selected in the 29th round of the 2019 Major League Baseball draft by the Baltimore Orioles. Roth made his professional debut with the Delmarva Shorebirds in 2021 posting an 8-4 record with an 4.54 ERA. He posted similar stats with the Aberdeen IronBirds in 2022 with a 10-5 record, 4.49 ERA, and 108 strikeouts in 100 innings.

On July 29, 2025, the Orioles selected Roth to the major leagues first time in his career. However he would not yet make his MLB debut, and on August 11, the Orioles outrighted him from the 40-man roster.

On February 18, 2026, Roth signed a minor league contract with the Seattle Mariners. In 36 games (5 starts) with Triple-A Tacoma Rainiers throwing 56.2 innings going 3-3 with a 4.92 ERA with 70 strikeouts and 4 saves. He elected free agency on November 2.

== Personal life ==
Roth grew up as a fan of the Houston Astros.
