= Stephen Jones (baseball) =

American baseball player (born 1997)

Miami Marlins
- Pitcher
- Born: July 30, 1997 (age 28); Tallahassee, Florida, U.S.
- Bats: Right Throws: Right

Stephen Chancey Jones (born July 30, 1997) is an American professional baseball pitcher in the Miami Marlins organization. He is currently a phantom ballplayer, having spent a day on the Marlins' active roster without making an appearance.

== Amateur career ==
Jones attended Chiles High School and played college baseball at Samford University. As a junior at Samford in 2018, he posted a 3–5 win–loss record with a 4.64 earned run average (ERA) and 47 strikeouts across 54 1/3 innings pitched. Jones was drafted in the 38th round of the 2018 Major League Baseball draft by the Philadelphia Phillies but opted not to sign with the team. He returned to Samford for his senior season, compiling a 3–0 record and a 2.21 ERA with 36 strikeouts. Jones was selected by the Colorado Rockies in the 21st round of the 2019 Major League Baseball draft.

== Professional career ==
=== Colorado Rockies ===
Jones made his professional debut in 2019 with the Boise Hawks, posting a 4.35 ERA with 28 strikeouts in 24 games. He did not play in a game in 2020 due to the cancellation of the minor league season because of the COVID-19 pandemic. Jones returned to action in 2021 with the Single–A Fresno Grizzlies and High–A Spokane Indians. He made 45 appearances between the two affiliates, recording a 3.86 ERA with 63 strikeouts across 49 innings pitched. Jones spent the 2022 season with the Double-A Hartford Yard Goats, pitching to a 2.64 ERA with 67 strikeouts. In 2023 with Double-A Hartford and the Triple-A Albuquerque Isotopes, he logged a 7.86 ERA in 53 games. He began the 2024 season with Albuquerque, registering a 13.08 ERA with 26 strikeouts across 20 appearances. On August 6, 2024, Jones was released by the Rockies organization.

=== San Diego Padres ===
On January 30, 2025, Jones signed a minor league contract with the San Diego Padres organization. He split the 2025 season with the Double-A San Antonio Missions and the Triple-A El Paso Chihuahuas, pitching to a 3.94 ERA with 55 strikeouts across 61 2/3 innings pitched.

=== Miami Marlins ===
On January 27, 2026, Jones signed a minor league contract with the Miami Marlins organization. He began the regular season with the Double-A Pensacola Blue Wahoos, appearing in ten contests and registering a 3.24 ERA with 19 strikeouts across 16 2/3 innings pitched. On May 7, Jones was selected to Miami's 40-man roster and promoted to the major leagues for the first time. He did not make an appearance for the team, and was designated for assignment the following day. Jones cleared waivers and was sent outright to the Triple-A Jacksonville Jumbo Shrimp on May 11.
