= Brian Jeroloman =

American baseball player (born 1985)

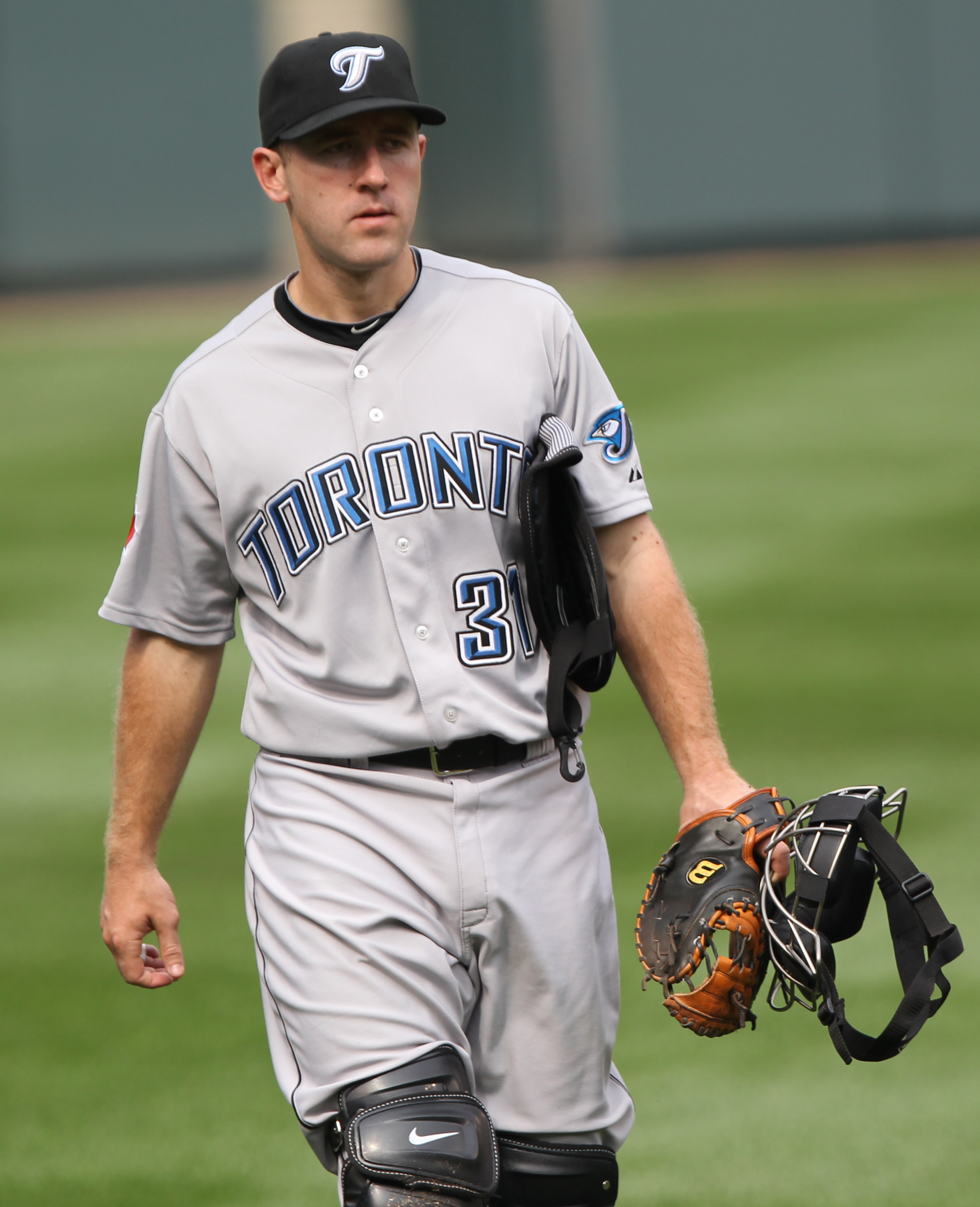
- Jeroloman with the Toronto Blue Jays

Current position
- Title: Hitting coach Recruiting coordinator
- Team: FIU
- Conference: Conference USA

Biographical details
- Born: May 10, 1985 (age 41); Suffern, New York, U.S.

Playing career
- 2004–2006: Florida
- 2006: Auburn Doubledays
- 2007: Dunedin Blue Jays
- 2008–2010: New Hampshire Fisher Cats
- 2008: Syracuse Chiefs
- 2010–2011: Las Vegas 51s
- 2012: New Hampshire Fisher Cats
- 2013: Syracuse Chiefs
- 2013–2016: Harrisburg Senators
- 2016: Syracuse Chiefs
- Position: Catcher

Coaching career (HC unless noted)
- 2019: South Florida (coach)
- 2023–present: FIU (coach/recruitment)

Brian Christopher Jeroloman (born May 10, 1985) is an American baseball coach and former catcher, who is the current hitting coach and recruiting coordinator for the Florida International University Panthers. Listed at 6 feet 0 inches (1.83 m) and 205 pounds (93 kg), he bats left-handed and throws right-handed. Jeroloman spent 11 seasons at various levels of Minor League Baseball, playing for farm teams of the Toronto Blue Jays, Pittsburgh Pirates, and Washington Nationals.

== Early years ==
Jeroloman attended Wellington High School in Wellington, Florida. He enrolled in the University of Florida, where he played for the Florida Gators baseball team.

== Playing career ==
=== Toronto Blue Jays ===
Jeroloman was selected by the Toronto Blue Jays in the sixth round of the 2006 draft. He was added to the Blue Jays' 40-man roster after the 2010 season to protect him from the Rule 5 Draft. He was called up to the major leagues on August 23, 2011, and, although he remained on the major league roster for the rest of the 2011 season (37 days), he did not appear in a major league game. Much later, it was revealed that Jeroloman was suffering from a sprained right wrist for at least part of his stay on the Blue Jays' active roster, but was never placed on the disabled list. Jeroloman's time on Toronto's active roster while failing to appear in a major league game make him a recent example of a "phantom ballplayer."

Jeroloman was claimed off waivers by the Pittsburgh Pirates on November 18, 2011, but was designated for assignment on November 21. Toronto re-claimed him off waivers on November 23. Jeroloman opened the 2012 season playing with the Blue Jays' Double-A affiliate, the New Hampshire Fisher Cats. Jeroloman was assigned to the Dunedin Blue Jays on August 7.

=== Pittsburgh Pirates ===
At the end of the 2012 season, Jeroloman became a free agent. On December 19, 2012, the Cleveland Indians announced they had signed Jeroloman to a minor league contract with a non-roster invitation to spring training. On March 29, 2013, the Indians traded Jeroloman to the Pittsburgh Pirates in exchange for cash considerations. The Pirates assigned Jeroloman to their Triple-A affiliate, the Indianapolis Indians.

=== Washington Nationals ===
On May 17, 2013, the Pirates traded Jeroloman to the Washington Nationals. On July 10, 2013, the Nationals sent Brian Bocock to the Pirates to complete the trade.

On September 4, 2013, during a playoff game with the Double-A Harrisburg Senators against the Erie SeaWolves, Erie runner Brandon Douglas violently collided with Jeroloman while trying to score. Jeroloman was receiving a throw from second base when Douglas ran in to him. Jeroloman was hospitalized in Erie after the collision; he suffered a cut on his chin and was dazed. Douglas suffered an injured shoulder, which had hit Jeroloman's neck and throat in the home plate collision.

Jeroloman signed a minor league contract with an invitation to the Nationals' 2014 major league spring training camp on December 2, 2013. He played for Harrisburg in 2014. Jeroloman signed a minor league contract with the Nationals on January 15, 2015. He was assigned to Harrisburg on April 25. During the 2016 offseason, Jeroloman signed a new minor league contract with Washington.

Jeroloman spent the 2016 season with Harrisburg and the Triple-A Syracuse Chiefs, slashing .229/.349/.305 with no home runs and 12 RBI. He elected free agency following the season on November 7, 2016. Jeroloman has not played professional baseball since the 2016 season.

In 11 seasons of minor league baseball, Jeroloman played in 773 games, batting .232 with 32 home runs and 266 RBI.
