= Shawn Zarraga =

Aruban baseball player (born 1989)

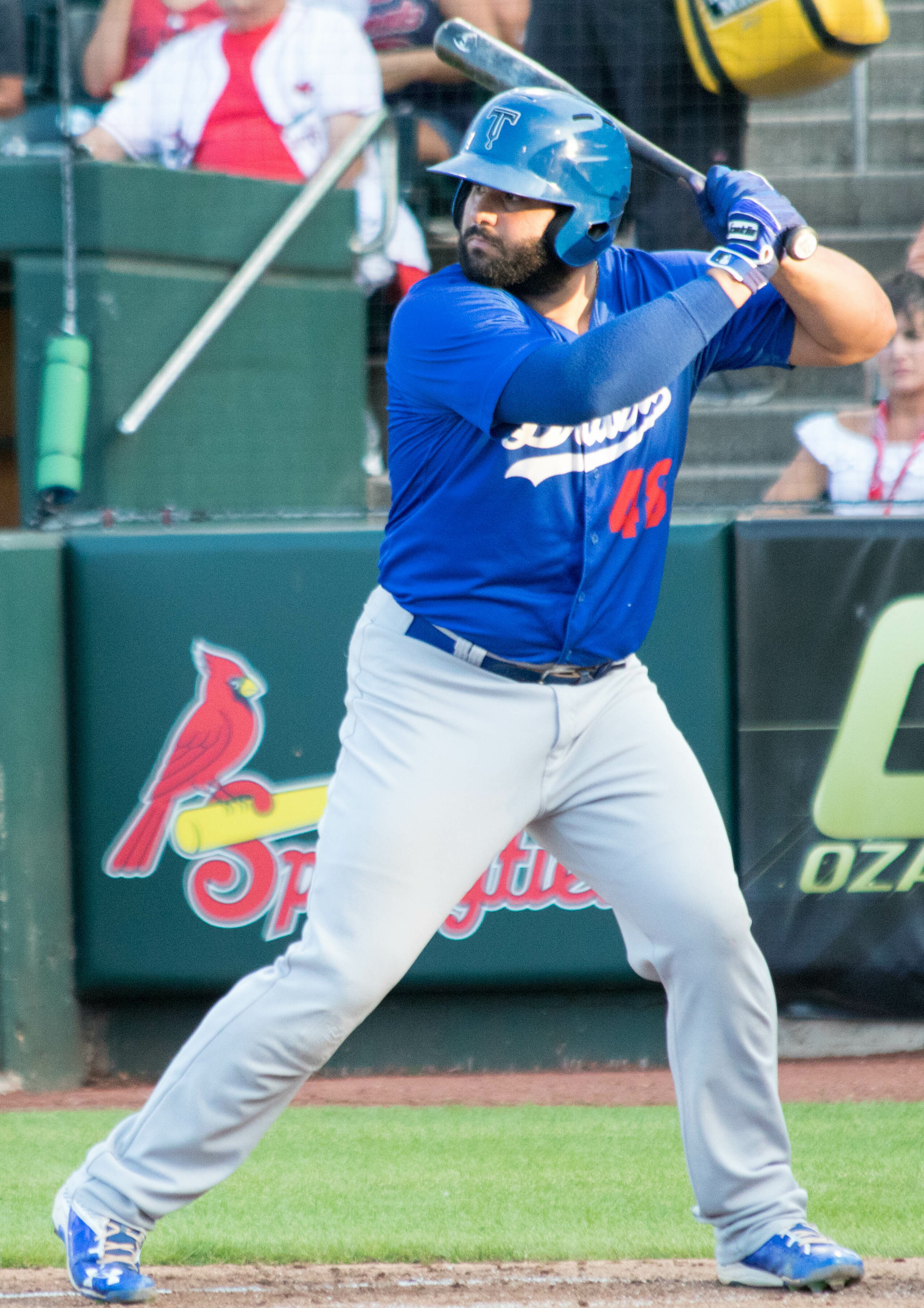
- Zarraga with the Tulsa Drillers in 2016
- Catcher
- Born: January 21, 1989 (age 37); Oranjestad, Aruba
- Bats: Switch Throws: Right
- Stats at Baseball Reference
Medals
Men's baseball
Representing Netherlands
European Baseball Championship
Gold medal – first place	2014 Brno	National team
France International Baseball Tournament
Gold medal – first place	2014 Sénart	National team

Shawn Joubert Zarraga (born January 21, 1989) is an Aruban former professional baseball catcher. He played for the Netherlands national baseball team in the 2015 WBSC Premier12 and 2017 World Baseball Classic. He is a phantom ballplayer, having spent a day on the active roster of the Los Angeles Dodgers in 2016.

== Career ==
=== Milwaukee Brewers ===
Zarraga was drafted by the Milwaukee Brewers in the 44th round of the 2007 MLB draft out of Trinity Christian Academy in Lake Worth, Florida. He began with the Arizona League Brewers in 2008 and then split 2009 between the Helena Brewers and Wisconsin Timber Rattlers. He was promoted to the Advanced-A Brevard County Manatees in 2010 and spent the next three seasons there before a 2013 promotion to the Double–A Huntsville Stars. In late 2014 he was promoted to the Triple–A Nashville Sounds.

=== Los Angeles Dodgers ===
On December 18, 2014, he was traded to the Los Angeles Dodgers in exchange for minor leaguers Jarret Martin and Matt Long. The Dodgers extended him an invitation to Major League spring training. Zarraga split 2015 between the Double–A Tulsa Drillers and Triple–A Oklahoma City Dodgers, hitting .286 in 62 games. In November 2015, he played for the Netherlands national baseball team in the WBSC Premier12.

The Dodgers purchased his contract from the minors and called him up to the majors on August 25, 2016. He returned to the minors the following day, without having appeared in a game. He was outrighted to the minors and removed from the 40-man roster on August 28. Zarraga's time on an MLB active roster, without ever appearing in an MLB game (to date), makes him a "phantom ballplayer". He played in 46 games between Tulsa and Oklahoma City in 2016, hitting .256. On November 7, 2016, Zarraga elected free agency.

=== Cleburne Railroaders ===
On November 25, 2016, Zarraga signed a minor league contract with the Cincinnati Reds. However, he did not appear in a game for the organization.

On April 20, 2017, Zarraga signed with the Cleburne Railroaders of the American Association of Independent Professional Baseball. Zarraga played in 41 games for Cleburne, slashing .272/.383/.397 with 3 home runs and 17 RBI.

=== Los Angeles Dodgers (second stint) ===
On July 14, 2017, Zarraga signed a minor league contract with the Los Angeles Dodgers organization. He finished the season with the Double-A Tulsa Drillers, appearing in 6 games and going 5–for–18 (.278) with 1 home run and 3 RBI. He elected free agency following the season on November 6.

On January 17, 2018. Zarraga re-signed with the Dodgers organization on a minor league contract. He was released prior to the season on March 30.

=== Somerset Patriots ===
On August 31, 2018, Zarraga signed with the Somerset Patriots of the Atlantic League of Professional Baseball. He did not appear in a game for the team, and became a free agent following the season.
