= Andrew Nardi =

American baseball player (born 1998)

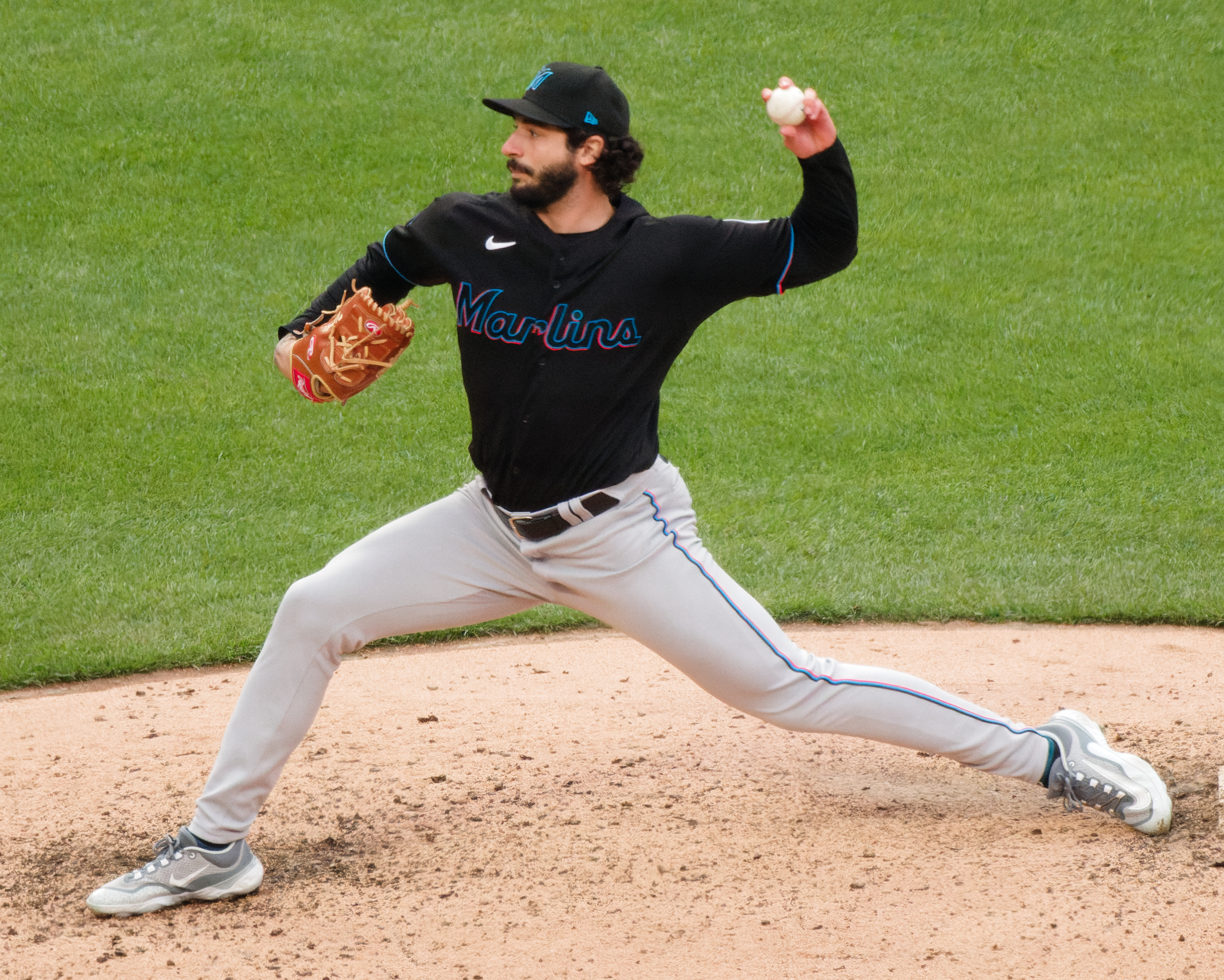
- Nardi with the Marlins in 2023

Miami Marlins – No. 43
- Pitcher
- Born: August 18, 1998 (age 28); West Hills, California, U.S.
- Bats: Left Throws: Left

MLB debut
- August 16, 2022, for the Miami Marlins

MLB statistics (through 2026 season)
- Win–loss record: 15–7
- Earned run average: 4.61
- Strikeouts: 194
- Stats at Baseball Reference

Teams
- Miami Marlins (2022–2024, 2026–present)

Andrew Christopher Nardi (born August 18, 1998) is an American professional baseball pitcher for the Miami Marlins of Major League Baseball (MLB). He made his MLB debut in 2022.

== Amateur career ==
Nardi attended Royal High School in Simi Valley, California, and played college baseball at Ventura College. He was drafted by the New York Yankees in the 39th round of the 2017 Major League Baseball draft, but did not sign and transferred to Moorpark College. He was drafted by the Washington Nationals in the 39th round of the 2018 MLB draft, but again did not sign and transferred to the University of Arizona to play for the Arizona Wildcats.

== Professional career ==
The Miami Marlins selected Nardi in the 16th round (471st overall) of the 2019 Major League Baseball draft. He signed and spent his first professional season with the rookie-level Gulf Coast Marlins and Low-A Batavia Muckdogs, posting a 2–0 win–loss record and 0.93 earned run average (ERA) across 14 games played. Nardi did not play in a game in 2020 due to the cancellation of the Minor League Baseball season because of the COVID-19 pandemic. In 2021, he returned to pitch for the Single-A Jupiter Hammerheads, High-A Beloit Snappers, and Double-A Pensacola Blue Wahoos, logging a 4–3 record and 3.61 ERA with 69 strikeouts in 52 1/3 innings across 29 games. He returned to Pensacola to start the 2022 season before being promoted to the Triple-A Jacksonville Jumbo Shrimp.

On August 14, 2022, Nardi was selected to the 40-man roster and promoted to the major leagues for the first time alongside Parker Bugg. Nardi made his MLB debut on August 16 against the San Diego Padres. He made 13 appearances for the Marlins during his rookie campaign, struggling to a 9.82 ERA with 24 strikeouts in 14 2/3 innings pitched.

Nardi made 63 appearances out of the bullpen for Miami in 2023, compiling an 8–1 record and 2.67 ERA with 73 strikeouts and 3 saves across 57 1/3 innings pitched.

Nardi pitched in 59 contests for the Marlins in 2024, registering a 3–2 record and 5.07 ERA with 70 strikeouts over 49 2/3 innings of work. He was placed on the injured list with a left elbow muscle injury on August 24, 2024. Nardi was transferred to the 60–day injured list on September 7, ending his season.

On March 15, 2025, Nardi was placed back on the 60-day injured list with low-back inflammation. He ended up missing the entire 2025 season.

Nardi began the 2026 season pitching out of Miami's bullpen, compiling a 3-3 record and 5.16 ERA with 27 strikeouts. On May 30, 2026, Nardi was placed on the injured list due to a stress reaction in his rib cage, and was given a recovery timetable of three months. He was transferred to the 60-day injured list two days later. On August 17, it was announced that Nardi would undergo season–ending elbow surgery.
