= Chet Trail =

American baseball player (born 1944)

- Second baseman / Shortstop
- Born: January 19, 1944 (age 82); Dorena, Missouri, U.S.
- Bats: Right Throws: Right
- Stats at Baseball Reference

Chester Borner Trail (born January 19, 1944) is an American former professional baseball infielder and clergyman. He was a phantom ballplayer, as he never appeared in any games while on the active player roster of a Major League Baseball (MLB) team. He was declared eligible for the New York Yankees roster for the 1964 World Series.

== Playing career ==
Trail attended Libbey High School in Toledo, Ohio, where he was a star player in baseball, basketball and tennis. He was later recruited by Ohio State University to play college basketball, but accepted a scholarship from Bowling Green State University instead, as they offered him the opportunity to play college baseball. Trail began being scouted by the New York Yankees. At 6 feet (1.8 m) tall, Trail believed that he was too short to have a professional basketball career, so he signed with the New York Yankees under the bonus rule on July 1, 1962, when he reportedly received a $43,000 signing bonus.

Trail made his professional debut in 1963 for the Fort Lauderdale Yankees, a minor league team in the Florida State League, where he had a .260 batting average. In 1964, Trail was with the Greensboro Yankees of the Carolina League, where he batted .257; he also played in the Florida Instructional League. Trail was ruled eligible for Yankees' 1964 World Series roster, but he was not activated and did not play. The Yankees had named Trail their "designated player" for the season under the aforementioned bonus rule, which allowed him to be assigned to a minor league club while still counting against (and being considered part of) the team's 25-man active roster.

Returning to Greensboro in 1965, Trail batted .276 with 22 home runs and 89 runs batted in. In 1966, he began the season with the Toledo Mud Hens of the International League, but struggled to get in the starting line up and was demoted to Greensboro.

Trail played for the Binghamton Triplets of the Eastern League and the Syracuse Chiefs of the International League in 1967. The Yankees eventually traded Trail to the Baltimore Orioles with Joe Brady on December 15, 1967, to complete an earlier trade where the Yankees acquired Steve Barber for Ray Barker, players to be named later, and cash. Trail retired after the 1969 season without playing in the major leagues.

Trail is the only player to have appeared on a World Series eligibility list without ever appearing in a major league game. There are, however, examples of a player making his major league debut in the postseason (Bug Holliday in 1885), a player making his major league debut in the World Series (Adalberto Mondesí in 2015), and a player's only major league appearances being in the postseason (Mark Kiger in 2006).

== Personal life ==
Trail's father, Eddie, played baseball in the Ohio-Indiana Negro League.

Trail was the third of ten children. Trail took courses at Bowling Green State during his playing career. After he retired, Trail worked in insurance and investments, and coached basketball at Sylvania Southview High School. He became a pastor, and later a bishop, working at Grace Temple Church of God in Christ in Toledo and Greater St. James Church of God in Christ in Fremont, Ohio.

Trail and his wife, Donna, have three daughters.

== See also ==
- Phantom ballplayer
