= Jasseel De La Cruz =

Dominican baseball player (born 1997)

Free agent
- Pitcher
- Born: June 26, 1997 (age 29); Hato Mayor, Dominican Republic
- Bats: Right Throws: Right

Jasseel De La Cruz (born June 26, 1997) is a Dominican professional baseball pitcher who is a free agent. He is currently a phantom ballplayer, having spent a day on the active roster of the Atlanta Braves without making an appearance.

== Career ==
=== Atlanta Braves ===
De La Cruz signed with the Atlanta Braves as an international free agent on June 1, 2015. He spent his first professional season of 2015 with the Dominican Summer League Braves, going 0–1 with a 7.11 ERA in six innings. De La Cruz split the 2016 season between the DSL Braves and the rookie–level Gulf Coast League Braves, going a combined 4–0 with a 2.18 ERA in 41 innings. He split the 2017 season between the GCL Braves and the Danville Braves, going a combined 2–4 with a 3.80 ERA in 42 2/3 innings. He played for the Rome Braves in 2018, going 3–4 with a 3.83 ERA in 69 innings. De La Cruz split the 2019 season between Rome, Florida Fire Frogs, and Mississippi Braves, going a combined 7–9 with a 3.25 ERA over 133 innings. On May 18, 2019, De La Cruz threw a no-hitter for the Florida Fire Frogs.

On November 19, 2019, the Braves added De La Cruz to their 40-man roster to protect him from the Rule 5 draft. On September 15, 2020, De La Cruz was promoted to the major leagues for the first time. He was optioned down the next day without making a major league appearance. On May 8, 2021, De La Cruz was again promoted to the majors but was again sent down on May 10 without playing. Following the conclusion of the 2021 season, De La Cruz was not tendered a contract, making him a free agent.

On March 13, 2022, De La Cruz re-signed with the Braves organization on a minor league contract. He split the year between the Triple–A Gwinnett Stripers, Double–A Mississippi Braves, and rookie–level Florida Complex League Braves. In 20 combined appearances, he struggled to a 7.18 ERA with 28 strikeouts across 26 1/3 innings of work. De La Cruz elected free agency after the season on November 10.

=== Oakland Athletics ===
On November 29, 2022, De La Cruz signed a minor league contract with the Oakland Athletics. He spent the majority of the 2023 season with the Double–A Midland RockHounds, also appearing in six games for the rookie–level Arizona Complex League Athletics. In 18 relief outings for Midland, De La Cruz struggled to a 13.73 ERA with 29 strikeouts across 29 2/3 innings pitched. He elected free agency following the season on November 6, 2023.

=== Sioux City Explorers ===
On February 20, 2024, De La Cruz signed with the Sioux City Explorers of the American Association of Professional Baseball. Due to delays with visa processing, De La Cruz did not make an appearance for the club, and he was released on May 26.

On October 23, 2024, De La Cruz signed with the Rieleros de Aguascalientes of the Mexican League. He was released prior to the start of the season on April 16, 2025.

On May 1, 2026, De La Cruz signed with the Sioux City Explorers of the American Association of Professional Baseball. He made six appearances for Sioux City, but struggled to a 1–4 record and 8.14 ERA with 23 strikeouts across 21 innings pitched.

On August 17, 2026, De La Cruz was traded to the Milwaukee Milkmen of the American Association of Professional Baseball in exchange for a player to be named later. However, he was released by the team two days later.
