= Parker Bugg =

American baseball player (born 1994)

- Pitcher
- Born: October 26, 1994 (age 31); Louisville, Kentucky, U.S.
- Bats: Right Throws: Right
- Stats at Baseball Reference

Parker Brent Bugg (born October 26, 1994) is an American former professional baseball pitcher. He is a phantom ballplayer, having spent two days on the Miami Marlins’ active roster without appearing in a game.

== Amateur career ==
Bugg played high school baseball at Rancho Bernardo High School and college baseball for the LSU Tigers. In 2014, he played collegiate summer baseball with the Yarmouth–Dennis Red Sox of the Cape Cod Baseball League.

== Professional career ==
=== Miami Marlins ===
Bugg was first drafted by the Baltimore Orioles in the 34th round of the 2013 Major League Baseball draft out of high school, but he did not sign with Baltimore. Three years later, he was drafted by the Miami Marlins in the 27th round 2016 Major League Baseball draft and signed.

Bugg spent his first professional season split between the Low–A Batavia Muckdogs and Single–A Greensboro Grasshoppers. In 19 contests, he posted a 3.71 ERA with 27 strikeouts and 4 saves in 34.0 innings of work. Bugg remained with Greensboro in 2017, pitching in 18 games and recording a 5.04 ERA with 35 strikeouts in 30 1/3 innings. He spent the 2018 season with the High–A Jupiter Hammerheads, making 37 appearances and logging a 3.07 ERA with 81 strikeouts across 67 1/3 innings of work. Following the season, he was named the "Jupiter MVP" by the Marlins organization.

Bugg split the 2019 season between the Double–A Jacksonville Jumbo Shrimp and Triple–A New Orleans Baby Cakes. In 41 combined appearances, he accumulated a 4–5 record and 5.64 ERA a with 75 strikeouts in 59.0 innings pitched. He did not play in a game in 2020 due to the cancellation of the minor league season because of the COVID-19 pandemic. In 2021, Bugg returned to Jacksonville, who were newly minted as a Triple–A club. In 32 games, he pitched to a 4.46 ERA with 85 strikeouts in 66 2/3 innings pitched.

On August 14, 2022, Bugg was selected to the 40-man roster and promoted to the major leagues for the first time alongside Andrew Nardi. He went unused out of the bullpen, and was designated for assignment two days later after Cole Sulser was activated from the injured list, becoming a phantom ballplayer. He cleared waivers and was sent outright to Triple-A Jacksonville on August 19. In 30 total games split between Jacksonville and the Double–A Pensacola Blue Wahoos, Bugg registered a 3.33 ERA with 54 strikeouts across 48 2/3 innings of work. He elected free agency following the season on November 10.

On February 3, 2023, Bugg signed a minor league contract with the Minnesota Twins organization. He was released by the organization on March 24.

=== Atlantic League ===
On April 22, 2023, Bugg signed with the Staten Island FerryHawks of the Atlantic League of Professional Baseball. In eight games for the team, he registered a 6.00 ERA with 16 strikeouts in nine innings of work. On July 22, Bugg was released by Staten Island.

On August 8, Bugg signed with the Gastonia Honey Hunters of the Atlantic League of Professional Baseball. In 14 games for Gastonia, Bugg had a 4.15 ERA with 17 strikeouts and 2 saves across 13 innings pitched.

On April 24, 2024, Bugg signed with the Lexington Legends of the Atlantic League of Professional Baseball. In 6 games (2 starts) for Lexington, he had a 5.51 ERA with 12 strikeouts across 16 1/3 innings pitched. Bugg was released by the Legends on July 26.

On May 14, 2025, Bugg signed with the York Revolution of the Atlantic League of Professional Baseball. In 15 appearances for York, he struggled to an 8.15 ERA with 18 strikeouts across 17 2/3 innings pitched. Bugg was released by the Revolution on July 18.

Bugg announced his retirement as a player via Instagram on August 4.
