= Norwith Gudiño =

Venezuelan baseball player (born 1995)

Centauros de La Guaira – No. 85
- Pitcher
- Born: November 22, 1995 (age 30); Puerto Cabello, Venezuela
- Bats: Right Throws: Right

Norwith Jossue Gudiño (born November 22, 1995) is a Venezuelan professional baseball pitcher for the Centauros de La Guaira of the Venezuelan Major League. He is currently a phantom ballplayer, having spent a day on the active roster of the Boston Red Sox without appearing in a game.

== Career ==
=== San Francisco Giants ===
On October 20, 2014, Gudiño signed with the San Francisco Giants as an international free agent. Gudiño spent his first three professional seasons with the Dominican Summer League Giants. In 40 total games (33 starts), he went 11–6 with a 2.62 ERA and 177 strikeouts in 178 2/3 innings pitched. Gudiño split the 2018 season between the Low–A Salem-Keizer Volcanoes, Single–A Augusta GreenJackets, and High–A San Jose Giants. In 16 games (14 starts), he accumulated an 8–6 record and 4.41 ERA with 76 strikeouts in 79 2/3 innings of work. Gudiño spent 2019 split between the rookie–level Arizona League Giants, Salem-Keizer, and Augusta. He made 11 total appearances, and recorded a stellar 0.53 ERA with 50 strikeouts in 33 2/3 innings pitched.

He did not play in a game in 2020 due to the cancellation of the minor league season because of the COVID-19 pandemic. Gudiño returned to action in 2021, playing for the Double–A Richmond Flying Squirrels and Triple–A Sacramento River Cats. In 32 games, he registered a 3.90 ERA with 86 strikeouts and 5 saves in 60.0 innings of work. He spent the entirety of the 2022 season with Triple–A Sacramento, but struggled to an 8.87 ERA with 60 strikeouts in 47 2/3 innings pitched. Gudiño elected free agency following the season on November 10, 2022.

=== Boston Red Sox ===
On December 5, 2022, Gudiño signed a minor league contract with the Boston Red Sox organization. He began the year with the Triple–A Worcester Red Sox, making 20 appearances and going 4–4 with a 5.54 ERA and 30 strikeouts in 52.0 innings of work.

On July 22, 2023, Gudiño was selected to the 40-man roster and promoted to the major leagues for the first time to serve as the 27th man in a game against the New York Mets. He went unused out of the bullpen and was returned to Worcester following the game, becoming a phantom ballplayer. On July 25, he was removed from the 40-man roster and sent outright to Triple–A. Gudiño was released by the Red Sox on July 31.

=== Sultanes de Monterrey ===
On March 1, 2024, Gudiño signed with the Sultanes de Monterrey of the Mexican League. In 15 games (10 starts) for Monterrey, he posted a 4–4 record and 5.55 ERA with 3& strikeouts across 48 2/3 innings pitched. Gudiño was released by the Sultanes on September 21.

=== Tecolotes de los Dos Laredos ===
On January 21, 2025, Gudiño signed with the Tecolotes de los Dos Laredos of the Mexican League. In seven appearances for Dos Laredos, Gudiño struggled to an 0-2 record and 10.29 ERA with 11 strikeouts over seven innings of work.

=== Olmecas de Tabasco ===
On May 14, 2025, Gudiño was traded to the Olmecas de Tabasco. He made 37 appearances for Tabasco, posting a 3-1 record and 2.78 ERA with 48 strikeouts across 35 2/3 innings pitched.

=== Centauros de La Guaira ===
On March 25, 2026, Gudino signed with the Centauros de La Guaira of the Venezuelan Major League. In 28 games he threw 34 innings with a 2.12 ERA with 44 strikeouts.
