= Dan Hammer (baseball) =

American baseball player (born 1997)

New York Mets
- Pitcher
- Born: September 10, 1997 (age 29); Philadelphia, Pennsylvania, U.S.
- Bats: Right Throws: Right

Daniel Hammer (born September 10, 1997) is an American professional baseball pitcher in the New York Mets organization. He is currently a phantom ballplayer, having spent a day on the Mets' active roster without making an appearance.

== Career ==
=== Amateur career ===
Hammer attended Father Judge High School in Philadelphia and the University of Pittsburgh, where he played college baseball for the Pittsburgh Panthers.

=== Baltimore Orioles ===
The Baltimore Orioles drafted Hammer in the 13th round, with the 378th overall selection, of the 2019 Major League Baseball draft. He made his professional debut with the Low-A Aberdeen IronBirds, recording a 1.29 ERA with 41 strikeouts across 10 appearances (six starts). He did not play in a game in 2020 due to the cancellation of the minor league season because of the COVID-19 pandemic.

In 2021, Hammer pitched for the rookie-level Florida Complex League Orioles, where he had a 1–3 record and 12.36 ERA with 23 strikeouts and one save in 19 2/3 innings pitched across 13 games. He split the 2022 season between the Single-A Delmarva Shorebirds and High-A Aberdeen IronBirds. In 25 appearances (including nine starts) for both affiliates, he posted a cumulative 5–4 record and 5.56 ERA with 92 strikeouts across 79 2/3 innings pitched.

Hammer spent the 2023 season pitching primarily out of the bullpen, making 29 appearances for Aberdeen and the Double-A Bowie Baysox, in which he accumulated a 2–3 record and 4.13 ERA with 56 strikeouts and two saves across 32 2/3 innings pitched. He returned to Bowie and Aberdeen for the 2024 season, recording a cumulative 3–2 record and 4.67 ERA with 51 strikeouts and three saves across 32 relief appearances.

=== Tampa Bay Rays ===
On December 11, 2024, the Tampa Bay Rays selected Hammer in the minor league phase of the Rule 5 draft. He spent the 2025 season with the Double-A Montgomery Biscuits, compiling a 2–4 record and 6.57 ERA with 40 strikeouts across 38 1/3 innings pitched. He elected free agency following the season on November 6, 2025.

=== New York Mets ===
On March 2, 2026, Hammer signed a two-year minor league contract with the New York Mets. He split time between the Double-A Binghamton Rumble Ponies and Triple-A Syracuse Mets, compiling a 4–2 record and 2.16 ERA with 38 strikeouts across 33 1/3 innings pitched. On July 8, it was announced that Hammer would be promoted to the major leagues for the first time. The following day, he was formally selected to the 40-man and active rosters. However, Hammer was designated for assignment on July 10 without having pitched in a game, making him a phantom ballplayer as of that day. On July 14, he cleared waivers and was sent outright to Triple-A Syracuse.

== See also ==
- Rule 5 draft results
