= Obi Muonelo =

American basketball player (born 1988)

Personal information
- Born: June 21, 1988 (age 38) Edmond, Oklahoma
- Listed height: 6 ft 5 in (1.96 m)
- Listed weight: 220 lb (100 kg)

Career information
- High school: Edmond Santa Fe (Edmond, Oklahoma)
- College: Oklahoma State (2006–2010)
- NBA draft: 2010: undrafted
- Playing career: 2010–2011
- Position: Shooting guard / small forward

Career history
- 2010–2011: Fort Wayne Mad Ants
- 2011: Austin Toros

Obi Muonelo (born June 21, 1988) is a former American professional basketball player who last played for Austin Toros of the NBA Development League. He played collegiately with the Oklahoma State Cowboys.

== Professional ==
Muonelo went undrafted in the 2010 NBA draft and signed a summer league contract with the Philadelphia 76ers. Muonelo was selected with the 10th overall pick in the 2010 NBA Development League Draft by the Fort Wayne Mad Ants.

For the 2011/12 NBA D-League season, Muonelo played for the Austin Toros.

== Santa Fe High School ==
At Edmond Santa Fe High School in Edmond, Oklahoma Muonelo averaged 19.6 points, 6.1 rebounds, 2.9 steals and 4.9 assists his senior year. He was the 19th prospect overall and the fourth best shooting guard. Obi led his team to the 6A state championship game where they ended their season at a 25–4. In his junior year he averaged 18.0 points and 10.2 rebounds.
