= Clayton Blackburn =

American baseball player (born 1993)

- Pitcher
- Born: January 6, 1993 (age 33); Amarillo, Texas, U.S.
- Bats: Left Throws: Right
- Stats at Baseball Reference

Clayton Blackburn (born January 6, 1993) is an American former professional baseball pitcher. His professional career spanned from 2011 to 2017, most of which he spent in the farm system of the San Francisco Giants. Blackburn twice was added to a Major League Baseball (MLB) active roster, but never appeared in an MLB game. During his career he was listed at 6 feet 3 inches (1.91 m) and 230 pounds (100 kg) while throwing right-handed and batting left-handed.

== Career ==
Blackburn attended Edmond Santa Fe High School in Edmond, Oklahoma.

=== San Francisco Giants ===
He was drafted by the San Francisco Giants in the 16th round of the 2011 Major League Baseball draft. He made his debut for the Arizona League Giants, finishing with a 1.08 earned run average (ERA) over 33 1/3 innings pitched.

In 2012, Blackburn pitched for the Augusta Greenjackets. He finished the year 8–4 with a 2.54 ERA and 143 strikeouts over 131 1/3 innings. Prior to the 2013 season, he was ranked by Baseball Prospectus as the 95th best prospect in baseball. He played the season with the San Jose Giants. He finished the year, 7–5 with a 3.65 ERA, 138 strikeouts over 133 innings. Blackburn was invited to spring training by the Giants in 2014. He played that season with the Double-A Richmond Flying Squirrels and also pitched in two games for the Arizona League Giants. In 20 starts he went 5–7 with a 3.31 ERA and 94 strikeouts in 98 innings. After the season, he played for the Scottsdale Scorpions in the Arizona Fall League.

Blackburn spent 2015 with the Triple-A Sacramento River Cats, finishing 10–4 with a 2.85 ERA and 99 strikeouts in 123 innings pitched. Blackburn was invited to spring training again in 2016, but started the season in Triple-A. Blackburn was called up to the Giants for the first time on May 12, 2016, but he did not appear in a game before being optioned back to Triple-A on May 17.

=== Texas Rangers ===
On April 16, 2017, the Giants traded Blackburn to the Texas Rangers in exchange for Frandy De La Rosa and cash considerations. He was called up to the major leagues on July 31, 2017. He was sent down to the minor leagues three days later without appearing in a game, becoming a phantom ballplayer

Blackburn underwent Tommy John surgery after tearing the ulnar collateral ligament of the elbow in April 2018. He spent the entire 2018 season on the 60-day disabled list, and consequently did not appear in any games. He was outrighted to Triple-A after the season but elected to become a free agent.

=== Cincinnati Reds ===
On December 21, 2018, Blackburn signed a minor league deal with the Cincinnati Reds. He was released on July 8, 2019, without having played during the 2019 season. On July 18, 2019, Blackburn announced his retirement from baseball.

== Personal life ==
Blackburn's oldest brother died in March 2015.

== See also ==
- Phantom ballplayer
