= Edmond Santa Fe High School =

Coordinates: 35.640742°N 97.509034°W

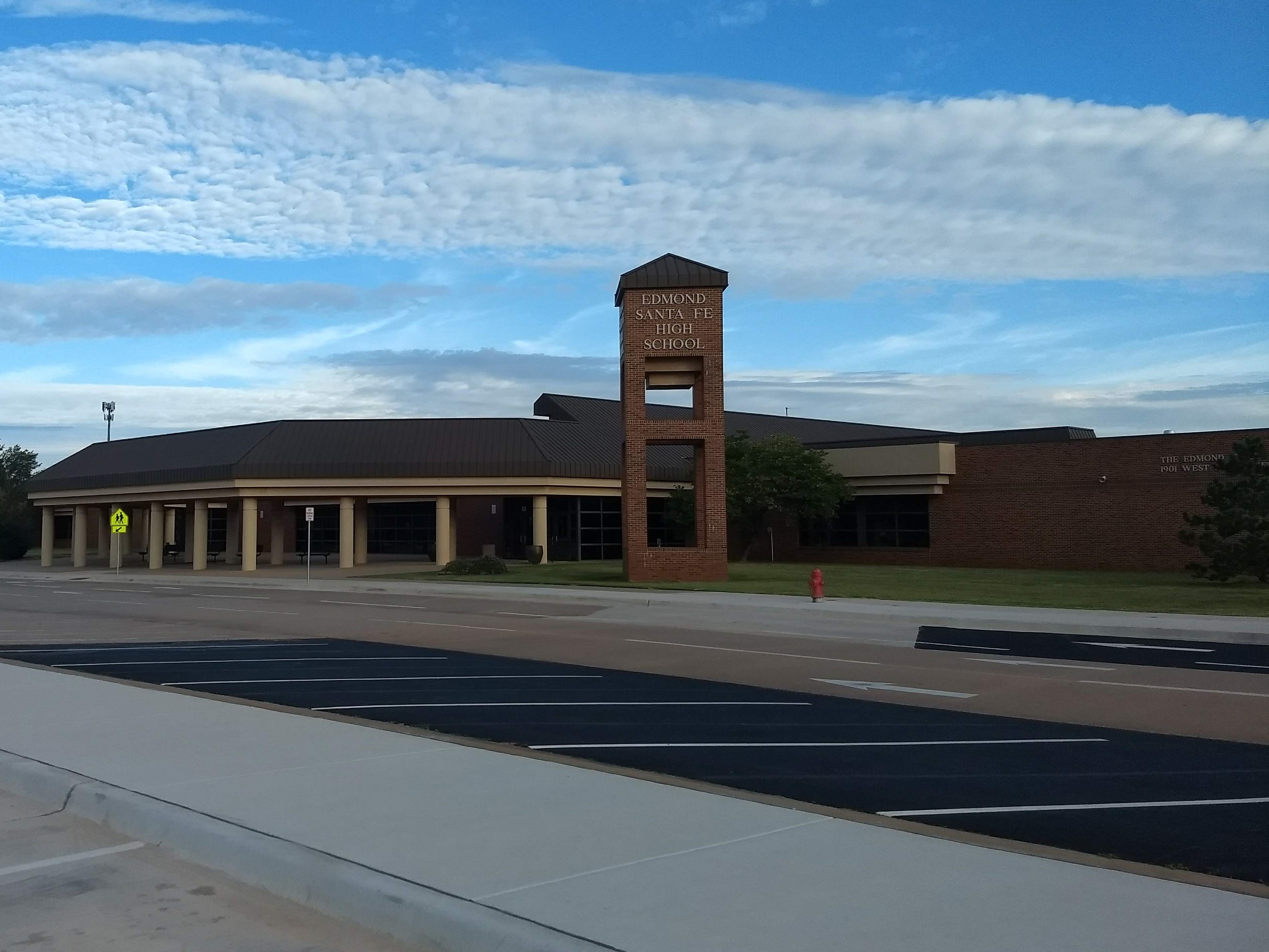
- 1901 West 15th Street; Edmond, Oklahoma 73013; United States

Information
- Type: Public school
- Established: 1993
- School district: Edmond Public Schools
- Principal: Jason Hayes
- Staff: 128.56 (FTE)
- Faculty: 129
- Enrollment: 2,780 (2023–2024)
- Student to teacher ratio: 21.62
- Colors: Forest green Gray
- Mascot: Wolves
- Rival: Edmond North High School, Edmond Memorial High School
- Website: santafe.edmondschools.net

Edmond Santa Fe High School is a public high school located in Edmond, Oklahoma, United States. Founded in 1993, Santa Fe is one of three traditional high schools in the Edmond Public Schools district, along with Edmond Memorial High School and Edmond North High School. The school's mascot is the Wolf, and the school colors are forest green and gray.

== History ==
The high school opened in 1993 along with Edmond North High School. In its first year, Santa Fe had only freshman and sophomore students; those initial sophomores were the school's first graduating class in 1996. It was recognized as a Blue Ribbon School of Excellence by No Child Left Behind in the 2011–2012 school year.

== Athletics ==
Santa Fe's athletic teams are nicknamed the Wolves.

State championships
Sport	Years
Baseball	2019, 2025
Basketball (boys')	2005
Basketball (girls')	2011, 2012
Cheerleading	2004
E-sports	2022
Soccer (boys')	1996, 2009
Track and field (boys')	1997, 2011
Track and field (girls')	2012
Volleyball	1993, 1994, 1995, 2004, 2013, 2017, 2018

== Performing arts ==
The school fields two competitive show choirs, "Finale" (Mixed) and "Serenade" (Treble) which have won competitions in Oklahoma. The school also hosts an annual competition.

Santa Fe also has a competitive marching band. They received eighth place at Bands of America St Louis regional in 2025

== Notable alumni ==
- Jared Allen, professional football player
- Clayton Blackburn, professional baseball player
- Ty Hensley, professional baseball player
- Mike Kennerty, member of the rock band The All American Rejects
- Obi Muonelo, professional basketball player
- Collin Oliver, professional football player
- Josh Richardson, professional basketball player
- Reggie Smith, professional football player
- Laura Spencer, actress
- Ekpe Udoh, professional basketball player
- Brandon Weeden, professional football and baseball player
- Brandon Whitaker, Canadian football player
