= Jeff Singer (baseball) =

American baseball player (born 1993)

- Pitcher
- Born: September 13, 1993 (age 32); Philadelphia, Pennsylvania, U.S.
- Bats: Left Throws: Left

Jeffery Michael Singer (born September 13, 1993) is an American former professional baseball pitcher. He is a phantom ballplayer, having spent a day on the active roster of the Philadelphia Phillies in 2022 without making an appearance.

== Career ==
=== Camden Riversharks ===
After going undrafted in the 2015 Major League Baseball draft, Singer signed with the Camden Riversharks of the Atlantic League of Professional Baseball. In 13 appearances for Camden, Singer posted a 5.26 ERA with 30 strikeouts in 49.2 innings pitched.

=== Philadelphia Phillies ===
On October 15, 2015, Singer signed a minor league contract with the Philadelphia Phillies organization. Singer split his first season with the Phillies between three affiliates: the Low-A Williamsport Crosscutters, the Single-A Lakewood BlueClaws, and the High-A Clearwater Threshers. In 23 appearances between the three teams, Singer registered a stellar 1.79 ERA with 46 strikeouts in 40.1 cumulative innings. In 2017, Singer split the year between Clearwater and the Double-A Reading Fightin Phils, logging a 3.00 ERA with 78 strikeouts in 63.0 innings pitched across 49 contests. Singer split the 2018 season between Clearwater, Reading, and the Triple-A Lehigh Valley IronPigs. Singer pitched to a cumulative 4.22 ERA with 55 strikeouts in 44 appearances between the three affiliates.

In 2019, Singer spent the season with Double-A Reading, working to a 2.34 ERA with 74 strikeouts in 42 total appearances. Singer did not play in a game in 2020 due to the cancellation of the minor league season because of the COVID-19 pandemic. In 2021, he returned to Triple-A Lehigh Valley, posting a 4.75 ERA with 67 strikeouts in 53.0 innings of work across 44 games for the team. He was assigned to Lehigh Valley to begin the 2022 season.

On April 12, 2022, Singer was selected to the 40-man roster and promoted to the major leagues for the first time after Corey Knebel was placed on the COVID list. Singer did not make an appearance in the Phillies' game against the New York Mets and was designated for assignment the following day after Knebel was reinstated from the COVID list. His time spent on the active roster without appearing in a major league game made him a phantom ballplayer. On April 15, Singer was sent outright to Triple-A Lehigh Valley. Singer appeared in 25 games for Triple-A Lehigh, but struggled to a 2–2 record and 7.04 ERA with 29 strikeouts in 30.2 innings pitched. He was released by the organization on July 24, 2022.

=== Kansas City Monarchs ===
On March 8, 2023, Singer signed with the Kansas City Monarchs of the American Association of Professional Baseball. He made 4 starts for the Monarchs, but struggled to an 0–3 record and 9.64 ERA with 11 strikeouts in 14.0 innings of work. Singer was released by the team on June 1.

=== Spire City Ghost Hounds ===
On June 9, 2023, Singer signed with the Spire City Ghost Hounds of the Atlantic League of Professional Baseball. In 16 games, his struggles continued as he posted a 17.05 ERA with 13 strikeouts in 12 2/3 innings of work. On July 29, Singer was released by the team.

On November 6, 2023, Singer retired from professional baseball.
