= Florida Complex League Phillies =

- Founded in 1984; Clearwater, Florida

Team logo	Cap insignia

Minor league affiliations
- Class: Rookie
- League: Florida Complex League
- Division: North Division
- Previous leagues: Gulf Coast League (1984–2020)

Major league affiliations
- Team: Philadelphia Phillies

Minor league titles
- League titles (3): 2002; 2008; 2010
- Division titles (4): 2002; 2008; 2010; 2018

Team data
- Name: FCL Phillies
- Previous names: GCL Phillies East & West (2018–2020); GCL Phillies (1984–2017)
- Ballpark: Carpenter Complex (1984–present); Joe DiMaggio Complex (2009)
- Owner/ Operator: Philadelphia Phillies
- Manager: Wilson Ramos

The Florida Complex League Phillies are a Rookie-level affiliate of the Philadelphia Phillies, competing in the Florida Complex League of Minor League Baseball. Prior to 2021, the team was known as the Gulf Coast League Phillies. The team plays its home games at the Carpenter Complex, in Clearwater, Florida. The team is composed mainly of players who are in their first year of professional baseball as either draftees or non-drafted free agents from the United States, Canada, Dominican Republic, Venezuela, and various other countries.

== History ==
The team first competed in the Gulf Coast League (GCL) in 1984, and has fielded at least one squad in the league continuously since then.

In 2009, the team played some games at the Joe DiMaggio Complex in Clearwater, Florida, while the Carpenter Complex was being renovated. The team also plays some home games at Bright House Field.

Beginning in the 2018 season, the Phillies have fielded two squads in the league, differentiate by "East" and "West" suffixes, originally based on the divisions (Northeast and Northwest) in which they competed. In 2019, both teams compete in the North division.

Prior to the 2021 season, the Gulf Coast League was renamed as the Florida Complex League (FCL). The Phillies returned to fielding a single team for the 2021 season.

== Season-by-season ==
Year	Record	Finish	Manager	Playoffs
1984	27-36	9th	Roly de Armas	
1999	26-34	11th	Ramon Aviles	
2000	31-29	8th	Ramon Aviles	
2001	31-29	7th	Roly de Armas	
2002	39-21	1st	Ruben Amaro	League Champs vs. GCL Dodgers (2 games to 1)
2003	23-33	12th	Ruben Amaro	
2004	36-24	2nd(t)	Roly de Armas	
2005	24-27	6th	Jim Morrison	
2006	18-31	12th	Jim Morrison	
2007	28-32	9th (t)	Roly de Armas	
2008	33-25	4th	Roly de Armas	League Champs vs. GCL Nationals (2 games to 1); Won in first round vs. GCL Pirates (1 game to 0)
2009	31-28	6th	Roly de Armas	
2010	32-24	2nd	Roly de Armas	League Champs vs. GCL Rays (2 games to 1); Won in first round vs. GCL Mets (1 game to 0)
2011	27-32	9th(t)	Roly de Armas	
2012	28-30	8th	Roly de Armas	
2013	30-30	6th(t)	Roly de Armas	
2014	36-23	3rd	Roly de Armas	
2015	36-24	4th	Roly de Armas	
2016	43-15	1st	Roly de Armas	Lost league finals vs. GCL Cardinals (2 games to 1); Won in 1st round vs. GCL Braves (1 game to 0)
2017	36-22	1st	Roly de Armas	Lost in 1st round vs. GCL Yankees East (1 game to 0)

=== GCL Phillies East ===
Year	Record	Finish	Manager	Playoffs
2018	30-24	6th (tie)	Roly de Armas	
2019	21-27	13th	Roly de Armas	Playoffs cancelled due to Hurricane Dorian

=== GCL Phillies West ===
Year	Record	Finish	Manager	Playoffs
2018	30-24	6th (tie)	Nelson Prada	
2019	33-15	2nd	Milver Reyes	Playoffs cancelled due to Hurricane Dorian

== Rosters ==
Florida Complex League Phillies roster
Players	Coaches/Other
Pitchers: -- Eligio Arias; -- Wilmer Blanco; -- Tegan Cain; -- Patrick Crotty; -- Alexander De Los Santos; -- Matthew Fisher; -- Deiry Gonzalez; -- Luis Gonzalez; -- Yordanis Guerra; -- David Hernandez; -- Angel Liranzo; -- Ramon Marquez; -- Jesus Montiel; -- Aneury Montilla; -- Anderson Navas; -- Matthew Potok; -- Raymon Rosario; Catchers: -- Anderson Araujo; -- Rey Cruz; -- Gabriel Flores; -- Guillermo Rosario; Infielders: -- Jonathan Alcantara; -- Logan Dawson; -- Romeli Espinosa; -- Jose Familia; Outfielders: -- Jalvin Arias; -- Jack Barker; -- Victor Cardoza; -- Maylerson Casanova; -- Esterling Rodriguez	Manager: -- Wilson Ramos; Coaches: -- Gustavo Armas (pitching); -- Joel Chimelis (hitting); -- Roly de Armas (bench); 50 Rafael Delima (hitting); -- Rubén Tejada (coach); 7-day injured list; * On Philadelphia Phillies 40-man roster; ~ Development list; # Rehab assignment; ∞ Reserve list; ‡ Restricted list; § Suspended list; † Temporarily inactive list; Roster updated April 30, 2026; Transactions; → More rosters: MiLB • Florida Complex League; → Philadelphia Phillies minor league players

== Alumni ==
See: Category:Florida Complex League Phillies players
