= Rafael Lantigua =

Dominican baseball player (born 1998)

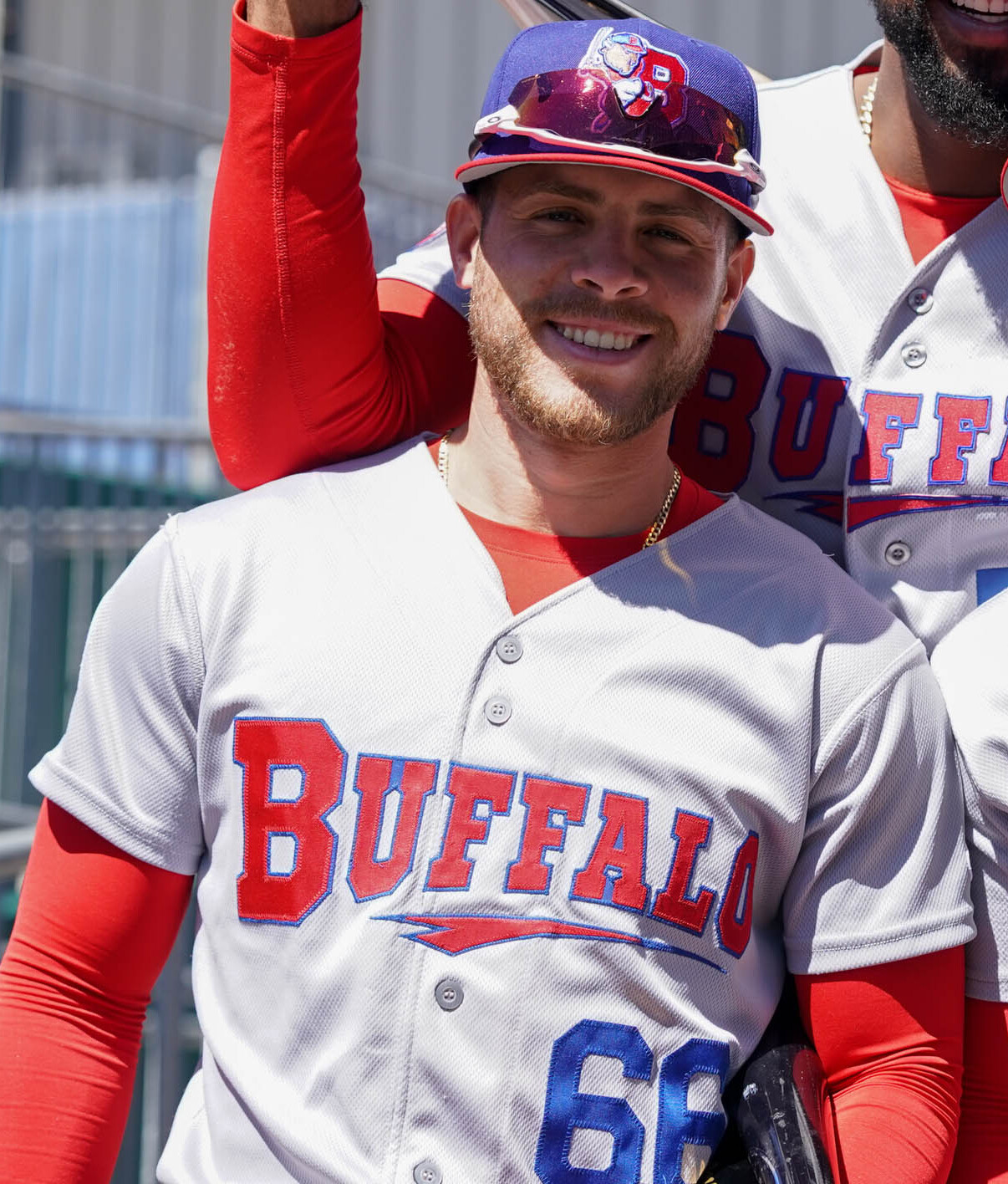
- Lantigua with the Buffalo Bisons in 2026

Free agent
- Infielder
- Born: April 28, 1998 (age 28); Puerto Plata, Dominican Republic
- Bats: Right Throws: Right

Rafael Lantigua (born April 28, 1998) is a Dominican professional baseball infielder who is a free agent. He is currently a phantom ballplayer, having spent three days on the Philadelphia Phillies' active roster without making an appearance.

== Career ==
=== Toronto Blue Jays ===
On August 22, 2016, Lantigua signed with the Toronto Blue Jays as an international free agent. He made his professional debut in 2017 with the Dominican Summer League Blue Jays, hitting .284 with 23 RBI in 59 games. Lantigua split the 2018 season between the rookie-level Bluefield Blue Jays and rookie-level Gulf Coast League Blue Jays, accumulating a .288/.403/.374 batting line with one home run, 26 RBI, and eight stolen bases over 56 combined appearances.

Lantigua spent the 2019 season with the Single-A Lansing Lugnuts, slashing .254/.302/.373 with four home runs, 31 RBI, and nine stolen bases. He did not play in a game in 2020 due to the cancellation of the minor league season because of the COVID-19 pandemic. Lantigua returned to action in 2021 with the High-A Vancouver Canadians and Double-A New Hampshire Fisher Cats. In 84 appearances for the two affiliates, he batted .270/.365/.453 with 11 home runs, 43 RBI, and 26 stolen bases.

Lantigua split the 2022 campaign between New Hampshire and the Triple-A Buffalo Bisons, hitting .274/.346/.393 with seven home runs, 64 RBI, and 15 stolen bases. Lantigua spent the entirety of the 2023 season with Triple-A Buffalo, slashing .305/.425/.469 with 12 home runs, 85 RBI, and 28 stolen bases across 129 appearances. He elected free agency following the season on November 6, 2023.

On November 16, 2023, Lantigua re-signed with the Blue Jays organization on a minor league contract. He made 130 appearances for Buffalo in 2024, batting .265/.367/.336 with four home runs, 33 RBI, and 16 stolen bases. Lantigua elected free agency following the season on November 4, 2024.

=== Philadelphia Phillies ===
On December 27, 2024, Lantigua signed a minor league contract with the Philadelphia Phillies organization. He made 124 appearances for the Triple-A Lehigh Valley IronPigs, hitting .232/.359/.333 with seven home runs, 56 RBI, and 17 stolen bases. On September 16, 2025, Lantigua was selected to the 40-man roster and promoted to the major leagues for the first time. He did not appear for Philadelphia before he was optioned back to Triple-A on September 19, and became a phantom ballplayer. On November 6, Lantigua was removed from the 40-man roster and sent outright to Lehigh Valley; he subsequently rejected the assignment and elected free agency.

=== Toronto Blue Jays (second stint) ===
On January 14, 2026, Lantigua signed a minor league contract with the Toronto Blue Jays. He made 64 appearances for the Triple–A Buffalo Bisons, posting a .190/.285/.282 slash line with three home runs, 19 RBI, and four stolen bases. Lantigua was released by Toronto on July 9.
