= Jimmy Whalen (baseball) =

American baseball player (1880–1915)

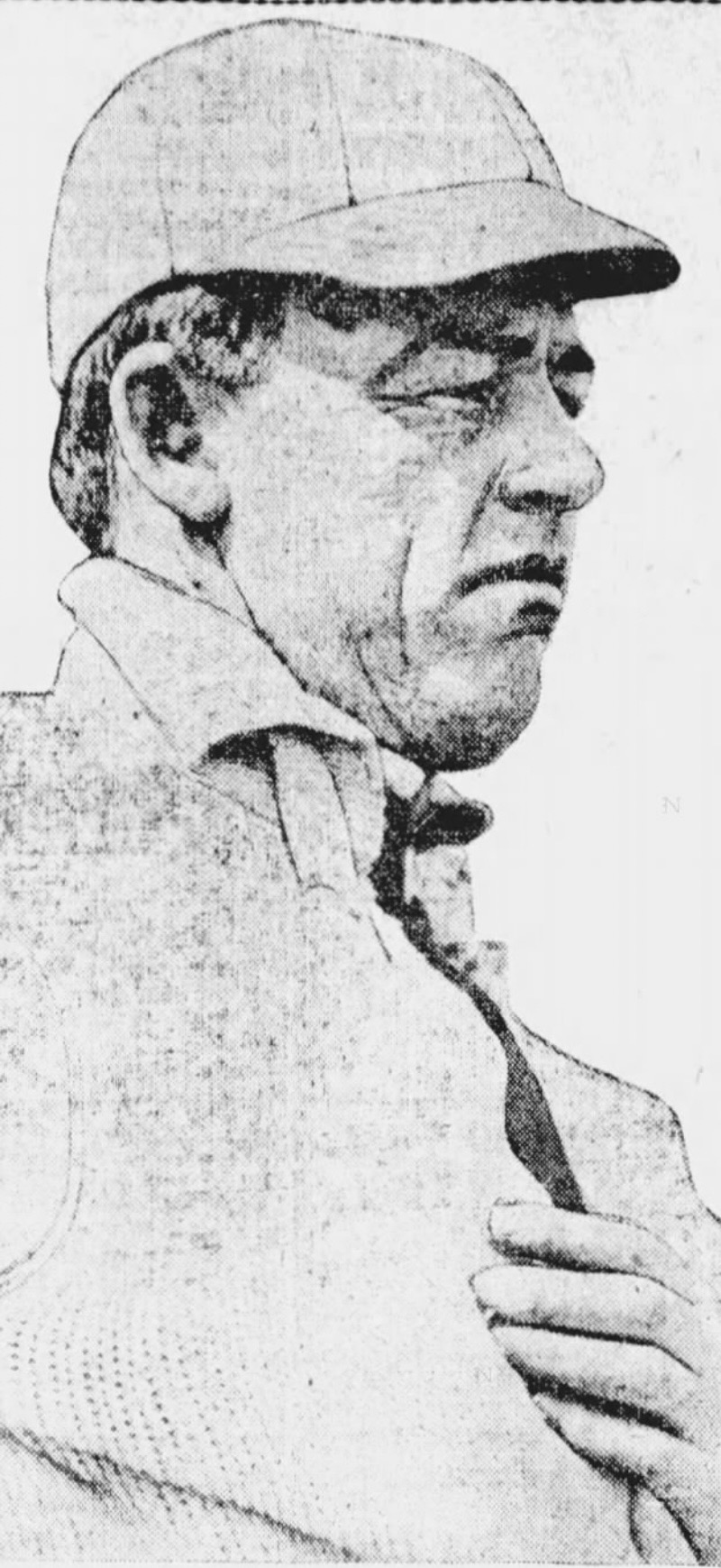
- Whalen in 1909
- Pitcher
- Born: 1880; San Francisco, California, U.S.
- Died: January 12, 1915 (aged 34); Sacramento, California, U.S.
- Batted: Unknown Threw: Right

Teams
- New York Highlanders (1906)

William Lester "Jimmy" Whalen (1880 – January 12, 1915) was an American professional baseball player who spent much of his career as a minor league pitcher in the Pacific Coast League (PCL) with the San Francisco Seals, Sacramento Sacts, and Vernon Tigers. Although he signed a Major League Baseball (MLB) contract with the New York Highlanders in 1906 and was with the team for the beginning of the season, Whalen never played in a Major League game. He was nicknamed "Jimmie, der Whale" and "Jimmy de Whale". He used an unusual pitching motion in which he turned his body to almost face second base before releasing the ball.

== Playing career ==
=== Initial minor league seasons ===
Whalen began his professional baseball career in 1898. He joined the Seals in 1901, pitching in at least 50 games and winning at least 29 games each season from 1901 through 1905. In 1902, before the founding of the Pacific Coast League, he led the Seals to the independent California League pennant with 30 wins as a pitcher. He threw many shutouts and was regarded by some as the "Matthewson [sic] of the coast". In one game on April 28, 1905, he pitched 39 scoreless innings.

=== New York Highlanders ===
In 1905, he agreed to a Major League contract with the New York Highlanders. However, he initially threatened to return to the Seals because the Highlanders refused to pay for his travel expenses to and from New York. He finally signed the contract in February 1906 after the issue was resolved and reported to the Highlanders. At the end of spring training he expressed concern that he would not have a chance to pitch regularly for the Highlanders. However, an article in the New York American reported that:

Experts who have seen this lad under fire tell Manager Griffith to bank on Whalen for winning box turns. Reports to headquarters are filled with references to advanced form of Yankees. In Jimmy Whalen the Yankees have a young pitcher who is looked to for warm weather starring. Whalen is a Pacific Coast recruit and San Francisco admirers cannot figure out how he can be crowded out of major league baseball. Although of a spare build, standing 5 feet and 10 inches and weighing 150 pounds Whalen has masterly control of pitching puzzles.

Whalen himself stated at the beginning of the season:

I have more speed now than I ever had before in my life. I am stronger than an ox and you should see the jump on my fastball. It is a dandy. We Californians could not ask for better treatment from the players. All try to make it as pleasant for us as they can.

On April 24, 1906, shortly after the regular season began and not having played in a game from the Highlanders, he received word that his house in San Francisco burned down in a fire resulting from the 1906 San Francisco earthquake, leaving him and his wife homeless and destitute. He remained with the team through the end of the month but in May the Highlanders sent him to the Montreal Royals of the Eastern League, where he pitched for the remainder of the 1906 season. He never played a game for the Highlanders or any other Major League team, making him a phantom ballplayer.

=== Later minor league seasons ===
Montreal sold him to the Williamsport Millionaires of the Tri-State League before the 1907 season. After helping Williamsport to the league pennant, he skipped their post-season barnstorming tour to return to California and pitch two late-season games for the Oakland Commuters. As a result of playing for Oakland in the outlaw California League, he was one of several players, such as Hal Chase and George Moriarty, who were threatened with fines and blacklisting from the National Baseball Commission.

Whalen remained in the California League for the 1908 season, signing with the Sacramento Sacts. He had wanted to return to the San Francisco Seals, but since the PCL was part of organized baseball and the Millionaires had not released him from his contract with them, he had to remain in the outlaw league. In June there were reports that he was jumping from the Sacts to the Seals but this did not occur.

In 1909, the California League merged with the Pacific Coast League and fell under the National Commission. Whalen remained with Sacramento for the 1909 and 1910 seasons. In April 1910 he was suspended for two weeks for punching an umpire in the jaw.

Whalen was sold to the Tacoma Tigers of the Northwestern League before the 1911 season and initial threatened to retire rather than report to Tacoma. He did report but was badly injured in an exhibition game in April, breaking his leg in four places when sliding into home plate. He was released by Tacoma and did not play that season. A PCL game in May between Sacramento and the Portland Beavers that May in which some of the gate receipts were donated for Whalen's benefit. Sacramento played poorly in the game, losing 24-15, prompting Sacramento fans to call for the injured Whalen to get into the game to show his former team how to play.

Recovered from his injury, he returned to the PCL in 1912 signing with the Vernon Tigers. He was ineffective and released in July.

== Personal life ==
Whalen died in 1915 from Bright's disease.
