= Will Toffey =

American baseball player (born 1994)

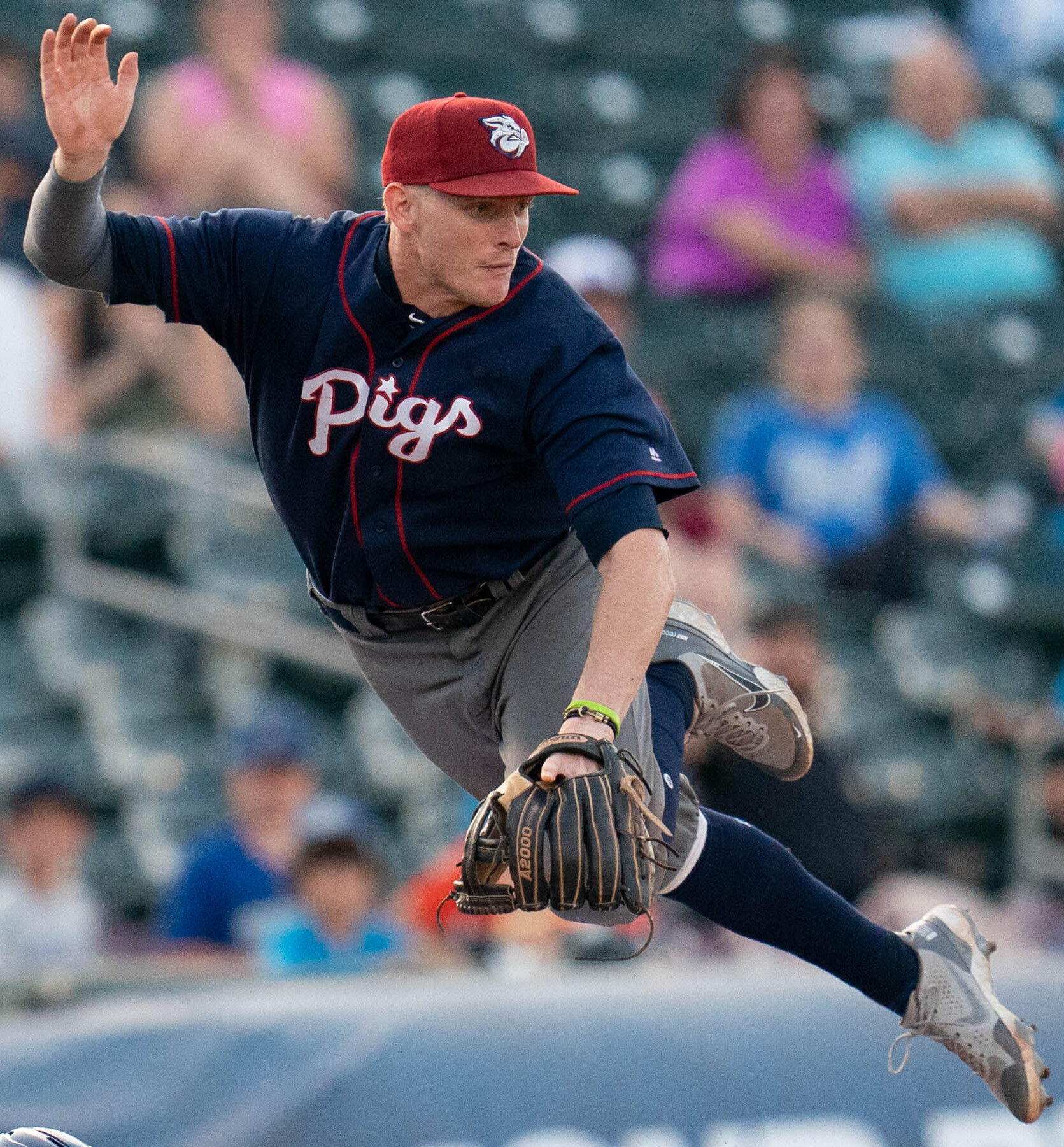
- Toffey with the Lehigh Valley IronPigs in 2022
- Third baseman
- Born: December 31, 1994 (age 31); Wareham, Massachusetts, U.S.
- Bats: Left Throws: Right
- Stats at Baseball Reference

William Tobin Toffey (born December 31, 1994) is an American former professional baseball third baseman. He was drafted by the Oakland Athletics in the fourth round of the 2017 Major League Baseball draft after playing college baseball for Vanderbilt University.

== Amateur career ==
Toffey is from Barnstable, Massachusetts. He attended Salisbury School in Salisbury, Connecticut, and accepted a scholarship to attend Vanderbilt University to play college baseball for the Vanderbilt Commodores over playing college hockey. The New York Yankees selected Toffey in the 23rd round of the 2014 MLB draft, but he enrolled at Vanderbilt rather than sign.

As a freshman with Vanderbilt, Toffey had a .294 batting average and 49 runs batted in (RBIs) in 255 at bats. He was named a freshman All-American. In his sophomore year, he batted. 277 with 22 RBIs in 203 at bats. Toffey played collegiate summer baseball in 2015 and 2016 for the Yarmouth-Dennis Red Sox of the Cape Cod Baseball League. The Baltimore Orioles selected Toffey in the 25th round of the 2016 MLB draft, but he again did not sign, returning to Vanderbilt for his junior year. He batted .326 with 28 RBIs in 95 at-bats as a junior.

== Professional career ==
=== Oakland Athletics ===
The Oakland Athletics selected Toffey in the fourth round of the 2017 MLB draft. He signed with Oakland for a $482,600 signing bonus, and made his professional debut with the Vermont Lake Monsters of the Low–A New York-Penn League where he batted .263 with one home run and 22 RBI in 57 games. Toffey began the 2018 season with the Stockton Ports of the High–A California League.

=== New York Mets ===
On July 21, 2018, the Athletics traded Toffey, along with Bobby Wahl, to the New York Mets in exchange for Jeurys Familia. The Mets assigned Toffey to the Binghamton Rumble Ponies of the Double–A Eastern League. In 89 total games between Stockton and Binghamton, he batted .248 with nine home runs and 51 RBI.

Toffey returned to Binghamton to begin 2019. He batted .219/.347/.349/.696 with five home runs and 27 RBI in 91 games with Binghamton. Toffey did not play in a game in 2020 due to the cancellation of the minor league season because of the COVID-19 pandemic. He returned to the Binghamton Mets to begin the 2021 season, and batted .178/.317/.386 with six home runs and 15 RBI in 34 games.

=== San Francisco Giants ===
On July 2, 2021, the Mets traded Toffey to the San Francisco Giants in exchange for Anthony Banda. He was assigned to the Triple-A Sacramento River Cats, where he batted .270/.407/.378 with 2 home runs and 9 RBI in 31 games.

=== Philadelphia Phillies ===
On March 27, 2022, Toffey was traded to the Philadelphia Phillies in exchange for Luke Williams. He was assigned to the Triple-A Lehigh Valley IronPigs of the International League to begin the year. On July 13, the Phillies selected Toffey's contract to their 40-man roster from Triple-A as a substitute player. He was sent back down after the game without making his debut and sent outright off of the 40-man roster to Lehigh Valley after he cleared waivers on July 16.

Toffey did not play in a game for the Phillies organization in 2023 and elected free agency following the season on November 6, 2023.

== Personal life ==
Toffey's father, Jack, played college and professional baseball and works as a sports agent. His older brother, John, played college baseball and hockey as well as minor league hockey for the Johnstown Chiefs.
