= List of Arizona Fall League team rosters =

Below are the 2023 rosters for the Arizona Fall League (AFL), an off-season baseball league owned and operated by Major League Baseball. The AFL operates during the autumn in Arizona at six different baseball complexes.

These are the 2023 team groupings and rosters. The 2024 season started on October 7, 2024

== East Division ==
=== Mesa Solar Sox ===
Mesa Solar Sox roster
Players		Coaches/Other
Pitchers: 29 Cooper Adams (BOS); 30 Alexander Alberto (TB); 23 Tyler Baum (OAK); 19 Logan Britt (LAA); 28 Micah Dallas (OAK); 51 Jack Dashwood (LAA); 34 Brandon Dufault (LAA); 36 Derrick Edington (TB); 35 Zach Fogell (BOS); 49 T. J. Fondtain (TB); 39 Wander Guante (OAK); 14 Houston Harding (LAA); 22 Jack Hartman (TB); 38 Grant Kipp (CHC); 32 Danny Kirwin (BOS); 47 Jackson Lancaster (TB); 12 Shane Marshall (CHC); 88 Mitch Myers (OAK); 56 Samy Natera Jr. (LAA); 7 Vince Reilly (CHC); 44 Luis Rujano (CHC); 40 Conor Steinbaugh (BOS); 33 Sam Thoresen (CHC); 25 Tyler Uberstine (BOS); 17 Jake Walkinshaw (OAK)	Catchers: 16 Moisés Ballesteros (CHC); 55 Brooks Brannon (BOS); Infielders: 1 Benjamin Cowles (CHC); 11 Max Ferguson (BOS); 24 Cole Fontenelle (LAA); 15 Mac Horvath (TB); 9 Xavier Isaac (TB); 8 Niko Kavadas (LAA); 46 Nick Kurtz (OAK); 20 Jonathon Long (CHC); 4 David Mershon (LAA); Outfielders: 41 Henry Bolte (OAK); 10 Denzel Clarke (OAK); 26 Tre' Morgan (TB); 18 Caden Rose (BOS)	Manager: Andy Schatzley; Coaches: Bruce Billings (pitching); Javier Godard (hitting); Sean Isaac (pitching); Braxton Martinez (hitting); 7-day injured list ~ Development list # Rehab assignment ∞ Reserve list ‡ Restricted list § Suspended list † Temporarily inactive list Roster updated October 28, 2024 → More rosters: MiLB • Arizona Fall League

=== Salt River Rafters ===
Salt River Rafters roster
Players		Coaches/Other
Pitchers: 22 Philip Abner (ARI); 30 Kade Bragg (MIN); 52 McCade Brown (COL); 29 Harrison Cohen (NYY); 40 Matt Cronin (WSH); 19 Michael Cuevas (WSH); 34 Jackson Fristoe (NYY); 41 Ryan Harvey (NYY); 45 Gabriel Hughes (COL); 46 Evan Justice (COL); 55 Jacob King (MIN); 26 Devin Kirby (MIN); 24 Carlos Lagrange (NYY); 33 Alfred Morillo (ARI); 60 Jack Noble (MIN); 75 Luis Pacheco (NYY); 23 Michael Prosecky (COL); 37 Dylan Ray (ARI); 44 Liam Rocha (MIN); 43 Dustin Saenz (WSH); 25 Chase Solesky (WSH); 25 Carlos Torres (COL); 51 Luke Young (WSH)	Catchers: 11 Jose Cordova (COL); 48 Antonio Gomez (NYY); 15 Maxwell Romero Jr. (WSH); Infielders: 13 Caleb Durbin (NYY); 7 Phillip Glasser (WSH); 1 Gino Groover (ARI); 5 Skylar Messinger (COL); 47 Ryan Ritter (COL); 2 Ben Ross (MIN); 4 Tommy Troy (ARI); Outfielders: 3 Juan Guerrero (COL); 6 Robert Hassell III (WSH); 50 Garrett Martin (NYY); 10 Kristian Robinson (ARI); 20 Kala'i Rosario (MIN)	Manager: -- Tyler Smarslok; Coaches: -- Franklin Bravo (pitching); -- Gabriel Hernandez (pitching); -- Derek Woodley (defensive); -- Nic Wilson (hitting); 7-day injured list ~ Development list # Rehab assignment ∞ Reserve list ‡ Restricted list § Suspended list † Temporarily inactive list Roster updated November 12, 2024 → More rosters: MiLB • Arizona Fall League

=== Scottsdale Scorpions ===
Scottsdale Scorpions roster
Players		Coaches/Other
Pitchers: 21 Andrew Baker (PHI); 59 Will Bednar (SF); 57 Chase Chaney (LAA); 41 Jack Choate (SF); 39 Davis Daniel (LAA); 43 Andre Granillo (STL); 61 DJ Herz (WAS); 30 Cooper Hjerpe (STL); 55 Marques Johnson (SF); 45 Nick Jones (LAA); 99 Seth Lonsway (SF); 40 Jordi Martinez (PHI); 00 Christian McGowan (PHI); 28 Luke Murphy (LAA); 26 Mitch Neunborn (PHI); 0 Edwin Nunez (STL); 18 Inohan Paniagua (STL); 35 Dominic Pipkin (PHI); 49 Holden Powell (WAS); 71 Orlando Ribalta (WAS); 43 Tekoah Roby (STL); 24 Jack Sinclair (WAS); 52 Eric Torres (LAA); 56 Thaddeus Ward (WAS); 32 Hayden Wynja (SF)	Catchers: 3 Jimmy Crooks (STL); 17 Zach Morgan (SF); 25 Israel Pineda (WAS); 16 Caleb Ricketts (PHI); Infielders: 23 Reggie Crawford (SF); 31 Sonny DiChiara (LAA); 50 Oliver Dunn; 8 Matt Kroon (PHI); 13 Trey Lipscomb (WAS); 7 Adrian Placencia (LAA); 11 Jeremy Rivas (STL); Outfielders: 43 Robert Hassell III (WAS); 6 Carter Howell (SF); 94 Gabriel Rincones Jr. (PHI); 1 Jadiel Sanchez; 22 Victor Scott II (STL)	Manager: -- Marty Malloy; Coaches: -- Sean Kazmar Jr.; -- Drew Martinez; -- Eric Peterson (pitching); -- Delwyn Young (hitting); 7-day injured list ~ Development list # Rehab assignment ∞ Reserve list ‡ Restricted list § Suspended list † Temporarily inactive list Roster updated October 9, 2023 → More rosters: MiLB • Arizona Fall League

== West Division ==
=== Glendale Desert Dogs ===
Glendale Desert Dogs roster
Players		Coaches/Other
Pitchers: 37 Jose Acuna (CIN); 32 Eric Adler (CWS); 98 Trent Baker (STL); 49 Alex Cornwell (STL); 28 Andrew Dalquist (CHW); 29 Arij Fransen (CIN); 31 Tristan Garnett (PHI); 33 Ivan Henderson (STL); 39 Anthony Hoopii-Tuionetoa (CHW); -- Alex Makarewich (LAD); 30 Brycen Mautz (STL); 16 Griff McGarry (PHI); 22 Christian McGowan (PHI); 94 Luis Mey (CIN); 44 Wesley Moore (PHI); 36 Peyton Pallette (CHW); 38 Wen-Hui Pan (PHI); 34 Connor Phillips (CIN); -- Kelvin Ramirez (LAD); -- Jerming Rosario (LAD); 15 Carson Rudd (CIN); 43 Matt Svanson (STL); -- Eriq Swan (LAD); 46 Grant Taylor (CHW)	Catchers: 8 Leonardo Bernal (STL); 51 Jordan Dissin (PHI); 90 Michael Turner (CHW); Infielders: 7 Edwin Arroyo (CIN); 2 Tyler Callihan (CIN); 17 Tim Elko (CHW); 27 Christian Encarnacion-Strand (CIN); 38 Jake Gelof (LAD); 9 Otto Kemp (PHI); 12 Colson Montgomery (CHW); 5 Bryan Rincon (PHI); 19 Thomas Saggese (STL); Outfielders: 11 Nathan Church (STL); 24 DJ Gladney (CHW); 88 Zyhir Hope (LAD); 5 Gabriel Rincones (PHI)	Manager: -- Ben Johnson; Coaches: -- Greg Brodzinski; -- Audy Ciriaco (hitting); -- Brian Garman (pitching); 7-day injured list ~ Development list # Rehab assignment ∞ Reserve list ‡ Restricted list § Suspended list † Temporarily inactive list Roster updated September 26, 2024 → More rosters: MiLB • Arizona Fall League

=== Peoria Javelinas ===
Peoria Javelinas roster
Players		Coaches/Other
Pitchers: 43 Peyton Alford (SEA); 49 Jarod Bayless (SEA); 25 Gabe Bierman (MIA); 16 Ike Buxton (MIA); 15 Ross Carver (CLE); 36 Haden Erbe (TB); 51 Bradley Hanner (CLE); 54 Leon Hunter Jr. (SEA); 39 Zach McCambley (MIA); 12 Miguel Mendez (SD); 38 Jake Miller (CLE); 26 Braden Nett (SD); 34 Cole Paplham (SD); 17 Francis Pena (SD); 58 Enmanuel Pinales (SD); 45 Erik Sabrowski (CLE); 44 Drew Sommers (TB); 95 Dale Stanavich (MIA); 20 Evan Taylor (MIA); 35 Troy Taylor (SEA); 50 Austin Vernon (TB); 55 Ryan Webb (CLE); 24 Patrick Wicklander (TB); 30 Logan Workman (TB)	Catchers: 18 Harry Ford (SEA); 19 Dominic Keegan (TB); 33 Paul McIntosh (MIA); Infielders: 10 Jacob Berry (MIA); 2 Ryan Bliss (SEA); 6 Christian Cairo (CLE); 7 Tyler Locklear (SEA); 9 Kyle Manzardo (CLE); 21 Nathan Martorella (SD); 0 Nasim Nuñez (MIA); 5 Graham Pauley (SD); 8 Carson Williams (TB); Outfielders: 22 Chase DeLauter (CLE); 1 Jakob Marsee (SD); 11 Shane Sasaki (TB)	Manager: -- Morgan Ensberg; Coaches: -- Danny Black; -- Chris Briones; -- Zac Livingston; -- Joel Mangrum (pitching); -- Pat O'Sullivan (hitting); 7-day injured list ~ Development list # Rehab assignment ∞ Reserve list ‡ Restricted list § Suspended list † Temporarily inactive list Roster updated October 9, 2023 → More rosters: MiLB • Arizona Fall League

=== Surprise Saguaros ===
Surprise Saguaros roster
Players		Coaches/Other
Pitchers: 46 Mitch Bratt (TEX); 54 Eric Cerantola (KC); 38 Joseph Hernandez (MIL); 39 Anthony Hoopii-Tuionetoa (TEX); 43 Bryce Hubbart (CIN); 41 Rylan Kaufman (KC); 35 Zak Kent (TEX); 90 Justin King (MIL); 26 Conor Larkin (TOR); 27 Zach Maxwell (CIN); 98 Andrew Moore (CIN); 47 Trent Palmer (TOR); 88 Jayvien Sandridge (CIN); 18 Adam Seminaris (MIL); 24 Justin Slaten (TEX); 33 Shane Smith (MIL); 15 Carson Spiers (CIN); 29 Fitz Stadler (TOR); 30 Emiliano Teodo (TEX); 34 Ricky Tiedemann (TOR); 40 CJ Van Eyk (TOR); 37 Jacob Wallace (KC); 49 Beck Way (KC); 23 Justin Yeager (MIL); 32 Ángel Zerpa (KC)	Catchers: 4 Liam Hicks (TEX); 0 Ian Moller (TEX); 9 Michael Trautwein (CIN); Infielders: 00 Eric Brown Jr. (MIL); 2 Austin Callahan (CIN); 19 Cameron Cauley (TEX); 5 Wes Clarke (MIL); 11 Nick Loftin (KC); 13 Damiano Palmegiani (TOR); 1 Peyton Wilson (KC); Outfielders: 6 Dasan Brown (TOR); 16 Gavin Cross (KC); 21 Jacob Hurtubise (CIN); 10 Hendry Mendez (MIL); 51 Abimelec Ortiz (TEX); 56 Alejandro Osuna (TEX); 20 Will Robertson (TOR)	Manager: -- Carlos Cardoza; Coaches: -- Austin Bibens-Dirkx (pitching); -- Mike Jacobs; -- Bijan Rademacher; -- JJ Reimer (hitting); 7-day injured list ~ Development list # Rehab assignment ∞ Reserve list ‡ Restricted list § Suspended list † Temporarily inactive list Roster updated October 13, 2023 → More rosters: MiLB • Arizona Fall League
