= 2019 Major League Baseball draft =

Major League Baseball player draft for the 2019 season

General information
- Date: June 3–5, 2019
- Location: Secaucus, New Jersey
- Network: MLB Network

Overview
- 1,217 total selections
- First selection: Adley Rutschman; Baltimore Orioles
- First round selections: 41

The 2019 Major League Baseball draft was held from June 3 to 5, 2019. The draft assigned amateur baseball players to MLB teams. The draft order was set based on the reverse order of the 2018 MLB season standings. In addition, compensation picks were distributed for players who did not sign from the 2018 MLB draft and for teams that lost qualifying free agents. The first 41 picks, including the first round and compensatory picks, were broadcast by MLB Network on June 3, and the second round was streamed on MLB.com directly following the first round. The remainder of the draft was streamed online from June 4 to 5.

The Baltimore Orioles, who had the worst record of the 2018 MLB season, selected Adley Rutschman with the first overall pick in the draft. The Atlanta Braves received the ninth overall pick as compensation for failing to sign Carter Stewart. The Arizona Diamondbacks received the 26th overall pick as compensation for failing to sign Matt McLain. The Los Angeles Dodgers received the 31st overall pick as compensation for failing to sign J. T. Ginn. The Pittsburgh Pirates received the 37th overall pick for failing to sign Gunnar Hoglund. As a result of surpassing the luxury tax threshold by over $40 million, the Boston Red Sox' top pick dropped down 10 places in the draft.

Andrew Vaughn of the Chicago White Sox made his debut on April 2, 2021, making him the first player from the 2019 draft to make his major league debut.

== First round selections ==
Key
	All-Star
*	Player did not sign

Pick	Player	Team	Position	School
1	Adley Rutschman	Baltimore Orioles	Catcher	Oregon State
2	Bobby Witt Jr.	Kansas City Royals	Shortstop	Colleyville Heritage High School (TX)
3	Andrew Vaughn	Chicago White Sox	First baseman	California
4	JJ Bleday	Miami Marlins	Outfielder	Vanderbilt
5	Riley Greene	Detroit Tigers	Outfielder	Hagerty High School (FL)
6	CJ Abrams	San Diego Padres	Shortstop	Blessed Trinity Catholic High School (GA)
7	Nick Lodolo	Cincinnati Reds	Pitcher	TCU
8	Josh Jung	Texas Rangers	Third baseman	Texas Tech
9	Shea Langeliers	Atlanta Braves (Note: Compensation pick for failing to sign Carter Stewart in the 2018 draft)	Catcher	Baylor
10	Hunter Bishop	San Francisco Giants	Outfielder	Arizona State
11	Alek Manoah	Toronto Blue Jays	Pitcher	West Virginia
12	Brett Baty	New York Mets	Third baseman	Lake Travis High School (TX)
13	Keoni Cavaco	Minnesota Twins	Third baseman	Eastlake High School (CA)
14	Bryson Stott	Philadelphia Phillies	Shortstop	UNLV
15	Will Wilson	Los Angeles Angels	Shortstop	NC State
16	Corbin Carroll	Arizona Diamondbacks	Outfielder	Lakeside School (WA)
17	Jackson Rutledge	Washington Nationals	Pitcher	San Jacinto College
18	Quinn Priester	Pittsburgh Pirates	Pitcher	Cary-Grove High School (IL)
19	Zack Thompson	St. Louis Cardinals	Pitcher	Kentucky
20	George Kirby	Seattle Mariners	Pitcher	Elon
21	Braden Shewmake	Atlanta Braves	Shortstop	Texas A&M
22	Greg Jones	Tampa Bay Rays	Shortstop	UNC Wilmington
23	Michael Toglia	Colorado Rockies	First baseman	UCLA
24	Daniel Espino	Cleveland Indians	Pitcher	Georgia Premier Academy (GA)
25	Kody Hoese	Los Angeles Dodgers	Third baseman	Tulane
26	Blake Walston	Arizona Diamondbacks (Note: Compensation pick for failing to sign Matt McLain in the 2018 draft)	Pitcher	New Hanover High School (NC)
27	Ryan Jensen	Chicago Cubs	Pitcher	Fresno State
28	Ethan Small	Milwaukee Brewers	Pitcher	Mississippi State
29	Logan Davidson	Oakland Athletics	Shortstop	Clemson
30	Anthony Volpe	New York Yankees	Shortstop	Delbarton School (NJ)
31	Michael Busch	Los Angeles Dodgers (Note: Compensation pick for failing to sign J. T. Ginn in the 2018 draft)	Second baseman	North Carolina
32	Korey Lee	Houston Astros	Catcher	California

=== Compensatory round ===
Pick	Player	Team	Position	School
33	Brennan Malone	Arizona Diamondbacks (Note: Compensation pick for the Washington Nationals signing Patrick Corbin)	Pitcher	IMG Academy (FL)
34	Drey Jameson	Arizona Diamondbacks (Note: Compensation pick for the Los Angeles Dodgers signing A. J. Pollock)	Pitcher	Ball State

=== Competitive balance round B ===
Pick	Player	Team	Position	School
35	Kameron Misner	Miami Marlins	Outfielder	Missouri
36	J.J. Goss	Tampa Bay Rays	Pitcher	Cypress Ranch High School (TX)
37	Sammy Siani	Pittsburgh Pirates (Note: Compensation pick for failing to sign Gunnar Hoglund in the 2018 draft)	Outfielder	William Penn Charter School (PA)
38	T. J. Sikkema	New York Yankees (Note: Yankees acquired Shed Long and the 38th pick from the Cincinnati Reds for Sonny Gray and Reiver Sanmartin.)	Pitcher	Missouri
39	Matt Wallner	Minnesota Twins	Outfielder	Southern Mississippi
40	Seth Johnson	Tampa Bay Rays (Note: Rays acquired the 40th pick from the Oakland Athletics as part of a three-team trade, in which the Rays also acquired Rollie Lacy, the Athletics acquired Jurickson Profar, and the Texas Rangers acquired Brock Burke, Kyle Bird, Yoel Espinal, Eli White, and $750,000 of international bonus pool space.)	Pitcher	Campbell
41	Davis Wendzel	Texas Rangers (Note: Rangers acquired the 41st pick from the Milwaukee Brewers in a trade for Alex Claudio.)	Third baseman	Baylor

== Other notable selections ==
Round	Pick	Player	Team	Position	School
2	42	Gunnar Henderson	Baltimore Orioles	Shortstop	John T. Morgan Academy (AL)
2	45	Matthew Thompson	Chicago White Sox	Pitcher	Cypress Ranch High School (TX)
2	46	Nasim Nuñez	Miami Marlins	Shortstop	Collins Hill High School (GA)
2	47	Nick Quintana	Detroit Tigers	Third baseman	Arizona
2	49	Rece Hinds	Cincinnati Reds	Shortstop	IMG Academy (FL)
2	50	Ryan Garcia	Texas Rangers	Pitcher	UCLA
2	51	Logan Wyatt	San Francisco Giants	First baseman	Louisville
2	52	Kendall Williams	Toronto Blue Jays	Pitcher	IMG Academy (FL)
2	53	Josh Wolf	New York Mets	Pitcher	St. Thomas High School (TX)
2	54	Matt Canterino	Minnesota Twins	Pitcher	Rice
2	55	Kyren Paris	Los Angeles Angels	Shortstop	Freedom High School (CA)
2	56	Ryne Nelson	Arizona Diamondbacks	Pitcher	Oregon
2	57	Matt Gorski	Pittsburgh Pirates	Outfielder	Indiana
2	59	Brandon Williamson	Seattle Mariners	Pitcher	Texas Christian
2	61	John Doxakis	Tampa Bay Rays	Pitcher	Texas A&M
2	62	Aaron Schunk	Colorado Rockies	Third baseman	Georgia
2	64	Chase Strumpf	Chicago Cubs	Second baseman	UCLA
2	65	Antoine Kelly	Milwaukee Brewers	Pitcher	Wabash Valley
2	66	Tyler Baum	Oakland Athletics	Pitcher	North Carolina
2	67	Josh Smith	New York Yankees	Shortstop	LSU
2	68	Grae Kessinger	Houston Astros	Shortstop	Ole Miss
2	69	Matthew Lugo	Boston Red Sox	Shortstop	Carlos Beltrán Baseball Academy (PR)
B	70	Alec Marsh	Kansas City Royals	Pitcher	Arizona State
B	71	Kyle Stowers	Baltimore Orioles	Outfielder	Stanford
B	72	Jared Triolo	Pittsburgh Pirates	Third baseman	Houston
B	73	Logan Driscoll	San Diego Padres	Catcher	George Mason
B	74	Tommy Henry	Arizona Diamondbacks	Pitcher	Michigan
B	75	Dominic Fletcher	Arizona Diamondbacks	Outfielder	Arkansas
B	76	Isaiah Campbell	Seattle Mariners	Pitcher	Arkansas
B	77	Karl Kauffmann	Colorado Rockies	Pitcher	Michigan
3	79	Zach Watson	Baltimore Orioles	Outfielder	LSU
3	81	Andrew Dalquist	Chicago White Sox	Pitcher	Redondo Union High School (CA)
3	82	Peyton Burdick	Miami Marlins	Outfielder	Wright State
3	83	Andre Lipcius	Detroit Tigers	Third baseman	Tennessee
3	84	Hudson Head	San Diego Padres	Outfielder	Winston Churchill High School (TX)
3	85	Tyler Callihan	Cincinnati Reds	Second baseman	Providence School (FL)
3	86	Justin Slaten	Texas Rangers	Pitcher	New Mexico
3	87	Grant McCray	San Francisco Giants	Outfielder	Lakewood Ranch High School (FL)
3	88	Dasan Brown	Toronto Blue Jays	Outfielder	Abbey Park High School (ON)
3	89	Matthew Allan	New York Mets	Pitcher	Seminole High School (FL)
3	90	Spencer Steer	Minnesota Twins	Shortstop	Oregon
3	92	Jack Kochanowicz	Los Angeles Angels	Pitcher	Harriton High School (PA)
3	93	Tristin English	Arizona Diamondbacks	First baseman	Georgia Tech
3	94	Drew Mendoza	Washington Nationals	Third baseman	Florida State
3	95	Matt Fraizer	Pittsburgh Pirates	Outfielder	Arizona
3	96	Tony Locey	St. Louis Cardinals	Pitcher	Georgia
3	97	Levi Stoudt	Seattle Mariners	Pitcher	Lehigh
3	98	Michael Harris II	Atlanta Braves	Outfielder	Stockbridge High School (GA)
3	102	Ryan Pepiot	Los Angeles Dodgers	Pitcher	Butler
3	106	Jordan Brewer	Houston Astros	Outfielder	Michigan
3	107	Ryan Zeferjahn	Boston Red Sox	Pitcher	Kansas
4	108	Joey Ortiz	Baltimore Orioles	Shortstop	New Mexico State
4	109	Michael Massey	Kansas City Royals	Second baseman	Illinois
4	112	Ryan Kreidler	Detroit Tigers	Third baseman	UCLA
4	113	Matt Brash	San Diego Padres	Pitcher	Niagara
4	114	Ivan Johnson	Cincinnati Reds	Infielder	Chipola College
4	115	Cody Freeman	Texas Rangers	Infielder	Etiwanda High School (CA)
4	116	Tyler Fitzgerald	San Francisco Giants	Shortstop	Louisville
4	117	Will Robertson	Toronto Blue Jays	Outfielder	Creighton
4	118	Jake Mangum	New York Mets	Center fielder	Mississippi State
4	120	Erik Miller	Philadelphia Phillies	Pitcher	Stanford
4	123	Matt Cronin	Washington Nationals	Pitcher	Arkansas
4	125	Andre Pallante	St. Louis Cardinals	Pitcher	UC Irvine
4	128	Graeme Stinson	Tampa Bay Rays	Pitcher	Duke
4	129	Brenton Doyle	Colorado Rockies	Outfielder	Shepherd
4	131	Brandon Lewis	Los Angeles Dodgers	Third baseman	UC Irvine
4	134	Kyle McCann	Oakland Athletics	Catcher	Georgia Tech
4	136	Colin Barber	Houston Astros	Outfielder	Pleasant Valley High School (CA)
4	137	Noah Song	Boston Red Sox	Pitcher	Navy
5	141	Evan Fitterer	Miami Marlins	Pitcher	Aliso Niguel High School (CA)
5	149	Will Holland	Minnesota Twins	Shortstop	Auburn
5	151	Garrett Stallings	Los Angeles Angels	Pitcher	Tennessee
5	153	Tyler Dyson	Washington Nationals	Pitcher	Florida
5	155	Connor Thomas	St. Louis Cardinals	Pitcher	Georgia Tech
5	156	Austin Shenton	Seattle Mariners	Third baseman	Florida International
5	160	Hunter Gaddis	Cleveland Indians	Pitcher	Georgia State
5	161	Jack Little	Los Angeles Dodgers	Pitcher	Stanford
5	163	Thomas Dillard	Milwaukee Brewers	Catcher	Ole Miss
5	165	Ken Waldichuk	New York Yankees	Pitcher	Saint Mary's
5	166	Hunter Brown	Houston Astros	Pitcher	Wayne State
6	168	Maverick Handley	Baltimore Orioles	Catcher	Stanford
6	170	Avery Weems	Chicago White Sox	Pitcher	Arizona
6	173	Drake Fellows	San Diego Padres	Pitcher	Vanderbilt
6	174	Graham Ashcraft	Cincinnati Reds	Pitcher	UAB
6	175	Cody Bradford	Texas Rangers	Pitcher	Baylor
6	177	Cam Eden	Toronto Blue Jays	Shortstop	California
6	179	Sawyer Gipson-Long	Minnesota Twins	Pitcher	Mercer
6	181	Zach Peek	Los Angeles Angels	Pitcher	Winthrop
6	182	Andrew Saalfrank	Arizona Diamondbacks	Pitcher	Indiana
6	185	Pedro Pagés	St. Louis Cardinals	Catcher	Florida Atlantic
6	187	Tanner Gordon	Atlanta Braves	Pitcher	Indiana
6	188	Colby White	Tampa Bay Rays	Pitcher	Mississippi State
6	189	Gavin Hollowell	Colorado Rockies	Pitcher	St. John's
6	195	Hayden Wesneski	New York Yankees	Pitcher	Sam Houston State
6	197	Chris Murphy	Boston Red Sox	Pitcher	San Diego
7	199	Noah Murdock	Kansas City Royals	Pitcher	Virginia
7	201	Bryan Hoeing	Miami Marlins	Pitcher	Louisville
7	204	Eric Yang	Cincinnati Reds	Catcher	UC Santa Barbara
7	205	Brandon Sproat*	Texas Rangers	Pitcher	Pace High School (FL)
7	211	Davis Daniel	Los Angeles Angels	Pitcher	Auburn
7	213	Todd Peterson	Washington Nationals	Pitcher	LSU
7	214	Blake Sabol	Pittsburgh Pirates	Catcher	USC
7	217	Darius Vines	Atlanta Braves	Pitcher	Cal State Bakersfield
7	220	Xzavion Curry	Cleveland Indians	Pitcher	Georgia Tech
7	221	Nick Robertson	Los Angeles Dodgers	Pitcher	James Madison
7	224	Drew Millas	Oakland Athletics	Catcher	Missouri State
7	226	Blair Henley	Houston Astros	Pitcher	Texas
8	229	Drew Parrish	Kansas City Royals	Pitcher	Florida State
8	236	Caleb Kilian	San Francisco Giants	Pitcher	Texas Tech
8	239	Casey Legumina	Minnesota Twins	Pitcher	Gonzaga
8	241	Kyle Brnovich	Los Angeles Angels	Pitcher	Elon
8	242	Dominic Canzone	Arizona Diamondbacks	Outfielder	Ohio State
8	248	Nathan Wiles	Tampa Bay Rays	Pitcher	Oklahoma
8	250	Will Brennan	Cleveland Indians	Outfielder	Kansas State
8	251	Ryan Ward	Los Angeles Dodgers	Outfielder	Bryant
8	252	DJ Herz	Chicago Cubs	Pitcher	Terry Sanford High School (NC)
8	253	David Hamilton	Milwaukee Brewers	Shortstop	Texas
8	255	Zach Greene	New York Yankees	Pitcher	South Alabama
9	258	Connor Gillispie	Baltimore Orioles	Pitcher	VCU
9	259	Clay Dungan	Kansas City Royals	Second baseman	Indiana State
9	262	Austin Bergner	Detroit Tigers	Pitcher	North Carolina
9	264	TJ Hopkins	Cincinnati Reds	Center fielder	South Carolina
9	265	Zak Kent	Texas Rangers	Pitcher	VMI
9	269	Brent Headrick	Minnesota Twins	Pitcher	Illinois State
9	278	Evan McKendry	Tampa Bay Rays	Pitcher	Miami (FL)
9	279	Isaac Collins	Colorado Rockies	Second baseman	Creighton
9	281	Alec Gamboa	Los Angeles Dodgers	Pitcher	Fresno City College
9	282	Tyler Schlaffer	Chicago Cubs	Pitcher	Homewood-Flossmoor High School (IL)
9	286	Peyton Battenfield	Cleveland Indians	Pitcher	Oklahoma State
10	289	Anthony Veneziano	Kansas City Royals	Pitcher	Coastal Carolina
10	315	Mitch Spence	New York Yankees	Pitcher	USC Aiken
10	316	C. J. Stubbs	Houston Astros	Pitcher	USC
11	319	Vinnie Pasquantino	Kansas City Royals	First baseman	Old Dominion
11	321	Anthony Maldonado	Miami Marlins	Pitcher	Bethune–Cookman
11	322	John McMillon*	Detroit Tigers	Pitcher	Texas Tech
11	326	Trevor McDonald	San Francisco Giants	Pitcher	George County High School (MS)
11	334	Jase Bowen	Pittsburgh Pirates	Center fielder	Central Catholic High School (OH)
11	337	Vaughn Grissom	Atlanta Braves	Shortstop	Paul J. Hagerty High School (FL)
11	340	Nick Mikolajchak	Cleveland Indians	Pitcher	Sam Houston State
11	344	Dustin Harris	Oakland Athletics	Third baseman	St. Petersburg
11	345	Oliver Dunn	New York Yankees	Second baseman	Utah
11	346	Ryan Gusto	Houston Astros	Pitcher	Florida SouthWestern State
12	348	Kade Strowd	Baltimore Orioles	Pitcher	West Virginia
12	363	Orlando Ribalta	Washington Nationals	Pitcher	Miami Dade College
12	368	Nick Sogard	Tampa Bay Rays	Shortstop	Loyola Marymount
12	369	Christian Koss	Colorado Rockies	Shortstop	UC Irvine
12	372	Hunter Bigge	Chicago Cubs	Pitcher	Harvard
12	377	Brendan Cellucci	Boston Red Sox	Pitcher	Tulane
13	378	Dan Hammer	Baltimore Orioles	Pitcher	Pittsburgh
13	379	Tyler Tolbert	Kansas City Royals	Shortstop	UAB
13	397	Tyler Owens	Atlanta Braves	Pitcher	Trinity Catholic High School (FL)
13	402	Porter Hodge	Chicago Cubs	Pitcher	Cottonwood High School (UT)
14	410	McKinley Moore	Chicago White Sox	Pitcher	Little Rock
14	411	Easton Lucas	Miami Marlins	Pitcher	Pepperdine
14	419	Cody Laweryson	Minnesota Twins	Pitcher	Maine
14	421	Zac Kristofak	Los Angeles Angels	Pitcher	Georgia
14	422	Lyle Lin	Arizona Diamondbacks	Catcher	Arizona State
14	433	Paxton Schultz	Milwaukee Brewers	Pitcher	Utah Valley
14	437	Jordan Beck*	Boston Red Sox	First baseman	Hazel Green High School (AL)
15	440	Caleb Freeman	Chicago White Sox	Pitcher	Texas Tech
15	449	Louis Varland	Minnesota Twins	Pitcher	North High School (MN)
15	452	Austin Pope	Arizona Diamondbacks	Pitcher	Fairfield University
15	458	Brett Wisely	Tampa Bay Rays	Second baseman	Gulf Coast State College
16	471	Andrew Nardi	Miami Marlins	Pitcher	Arizona
16	487	Joey Estes	Atlanta Braves	Pitcher	Paraclete High School (CA)
16	494	Brady Basso	Oakland Athletics	Pitcher	Oklahoma State
17	498	Morgan McSweeney	Baltimore Orioles	Pitcher	Wake Forest
17	501	Troy Johnston	Miami Marlins	First baseman	Gonzaga
17	514	Ryan Harbin	Pittsburgh Pirates	Pitcher	Bartow High School (FL)
17	518	Trevor Brigden	Tampa Bay Rays	Pitcher	Okanagan
18	530	Sammy Peralta	Chicago White Sox	Pitcher	Tampa
18	539	Edouard Julien	Minnesota Twins	Second baseman	Auburn
18	541	Ryan Smith	Los Angeles Angels	Pitcher	Princeton
18	550	Matt Waldron	Cleveland Indians	Pitcher	Nebraska
19	562	Kerry Carpenter	Detroit Tigers	Outfielder	Virginia Tech
19	565	Blaine Crim	Texas Rangers	First baseman	Mississippi College
20	601	Jared Southard*	Los Angeles Angels	Pitcher	Rouse High School (TX)
20	606	Cade Marlowe	Seattle Mariners	Outfielder	West Georgia
20	610	Nic Enright	Cleveland Indians	Pitcher	Virginia Tech
20	615	Jack Leiter*	New York Yankees	Pitcher	Delbarton School (NJ)
21	620	Chase Solesky	Chicago White Sox	Pitcher	Tulane
21	629	Bradley Hanner	Minnesota Twins	Pitcher	Patrick & Henry Community College
22	674	Jack Cushing	Oakland Athletics	Pitcher	Georgetown
23	692	Dane Acker*	Arizona Diamondbacks	Pitcher	San Jacinto College
23	698	Jayden Murray	Tampa Bay Rays	Pitcher	Dixie State
23	699	Blair Calvo	Colorado Rockies	Pitcher	Flagler
24	711	Jeff Lindgren	Miami Marlins	Pitcher	Illinois State
24	717	Spencer Horwitz	Toronto Blue Jays	First baseman	Radford
24	718	Hunter Barco*	New York Mets	Pitcher	The Bolles School (FL)
24	723	Jake Alu	Washington Nationals	Third baseman	Boston College
24	727	Bryce Ball	Atlanta Braves	First baseman	Dallas Baptist
25	755	Alex McFarlane*	St. Louis Cardinals	Pitcher	Habersham Central High School (GA)
25	761	Jonny DeLuca	Los Angeles Dodgers	Outfielder	Oregon
26	776	Nick Avila	San Francisco Giants	Pitcher	Long Beach State
26	781	Kyle Molnar	Los Angeles Dodgers	Pitcher	UCLA
27	802	Beau Brieske	Detroit Tigers	Pitcher	CSU–Pueblo
27	822	Cayne Ueckert	Chicago Cubs	Pitcher	McNeese State
28	841	Coleman Crow	Los Angeles Angels	Pitcher	Pike County High School (GA)
30	912	Bryan King	Chicago Cubs	Pitcher	McNeese State
30	915	Zach Maxwell*	New York Yankees	Pitcher	North Paulding High School (GA)
31	931	Spencer Jones*	Los Angeles Angels	Outfielder	La Costa Canyon High School (CA)
31	947	Feleipe Franks	Boston Red Sox	Pitcher	Florida
32	951	Josh Simpson	Miami Marlins	Pitcher	Columbia
32	957	Braden Halladay*	Toronto Blue Jays	Pitcher	Calvary Christian High School (FL)
32	962	Luke Waddell*	Arizona Diamondbacks	Shortstop	Georgia Tech
32	968	Kody Huff*	Tampa Bay Rays	Catcher	Horizon High School (AZ)
32	970	Andrew Misiaszek	Cleveland Indians	Pitcher	Northeastern
33	997	Justin Yeager	Atlanta Braves	Pitcher	Southern Illinois
33	1007	Thayer Thomas*	Washington Nationals	Outfielder	NC State
34	1026	Christian Encarnacion-Strand*	Seattle Mariners	Third baseman	Yavapai College
34	1029	Tanner Allen*	Colorado Rockies	Outfielder	Mississippi State
35	1046	Brooks Lee*	San Francisco Giants	Shortstop	San Luis Obispo High School (CA)
35	1049	Drew Gilbert*	Minnesota Twins	Outfielder	Stillwater Area High School (MN)
35	1060	Randy Labaut	Cleveland Indians	Pitcher	Arizona
36	1070	Declan Cronin	Chicago White Sox	Pitcher	Holy Cross
37	1098	Colby Thomas*	Baltimore Orioles	Outfielder	Valdosta High School (GA)
37	1099	Reggie Crawford*	Kansas City Royals	Pitcher	North Schuylkill High School (PA)
37	1119	Hayden Dunhurst*	Colorado Rockies	Catcher	Pearl River Central High School (MS)
37	1125	Bryce Jarvis*	New York Yankees	Pitcher	Duke
37	1127	Connor Prielipp*	Boston Red Sox	Pitcher	Tomah High School (WI)
38	1140	Josh Hendrickson	Philadelphia Phillies	Pitcher	San Diego
39	1161	Evan Justice*	Miami Marlins	Pitcher	NC State

== Notes ==
Compensation picks

Trades
