= Lotulelei =

Lotulelei is a surname. Notable people with the surname include:

- John Lotulelei (born 1991), American football player.
- Star Lotulelei (born 1989), American football player, cousin of John.
