= Joe Bertram =

Joe Bertram may refer to:

- Joe Bertram (Hawaii politician) (1957–2020)
- Joe Bertram (Minnesota politician) (born 1954)
