= Bindon =

Bindon may refer to

== Places ==
in England

- Bindon, Somerset
- Bindon Abbey, Dorset
- Bindon Hill, Dorset
- Bindon, Axmouth, Devon, a historic manor
- Bindon Liberty, a liberty in Dorset, England

== People ==
- Francis Bindon (1690–1765), Irish architect and painter
- James J. Bindon (1884–1938), businessman and politician in Newfoundland
- Jenny Bindon (born 1973), American soccer player
- John Bindon (1943–1993), British actor and criminal
- Katy Bindon, Canadian academic
- Earl of Bindon, a title extant between 1706 and 1722
- Bindon Blood (1842–1940), British soldier
- Tyler Bindon (born 2005), New Zealand footballer
