= SunCentral Inc. =

Canadian manufacturing company

- Industry: Manufacturing
- Founded: 2010
- Founder: Lorne Whitehead
- Headquarters: Vancouver, British Columbia, Canada
- Products: "Core Sunlighting System", SunBeamer

SunCentral Inc. was a manufacturer of active daylighting products based in Vancouver, British Columbia, Canada. The company was founded in 2010 to commercialize the “Core Sunlighting System” developed at the University of British Columbia.

The "Core Sunlighting System" uses sunlight tracking and concentrating optics integrated within the curtain wall façade of multi-storey commercial buildings. The system delivers sunlight deep within each floor of the building via hybrid prism light guides. The light guides, developed by inventor Lorne Whitehead, a professor at the University of British Columbia and the founder of SunCentral, are mounted in modern lighting fixtures that provide both electric lighting and sunlight. When the sun shines, electric lighting is dimmed or turned off, resulting in energy savings and reduced HVAC load.

SunCentral has collaborated with several education institutions, including the California Lighting Technology Center at UC Davis. Technology demonstrations have been completed and tested at the University of British Columbia, British Columbia Institute of Technology, and at the Okanagan College.

An autonomous daylight tracking product, the SunBeamer, was commercially released by SunCentral in 2012. SunBeamers were installed at the “Imagining the Lowline Exhibit” in September, 2012, to deliver sunlight to the exhibit space.

They wrapped up operations shortly after completing their first successful Chinese manufacturing run of their second model. Owing thousands of dollars in unpaid wages and leaving many other unpaid bills behind.
