= Maureen Gruben =

Inuit artist from Canada (born 1963)

Gruben, Maureen
- Born: 1963 (age 62–63); Tuktoyaktuk
- Citizenship: Inuvialuk and Canadian
- Education: Okanagan College, Kelowna (1990) and University of Victoria (2012)
- Website: www.maureengruben.com

Maureen Gruben is an Inuvialuk artist from Canada, who works in sculpture, installation and public art.

== Biography ==
Gruben was born in Tuktoyaktuk. She received a Diploma in Fine Arts from Okanagan College, Kelowna in 1990. In 2012 she received a Bachelor of Fine Arts degree from the University of Victoria.

In May 2021 it was announced that Gruben was on the long list for the annual Sobey Art Award, one of five artists from the "Prairies and North".

In 2021 the National Gallery of Canada lifted its "40-and-under" age restriction allowing for the inclusion of Gruben and other artists.

== Exhibitions ==
- 2026 Qillaniq, National Gallery of Canada
- 2020 Àbadakone, National Gallery of Canada.
- 2019 Transit and Returns, Vancouver Art Gallery
- 2019 Breathing Hole, Winnipeg Art Gallery
- 2019 AIVIQ &NANUQ: Sea Horse and Sea Bear of the Arctic, Anchorage Museum
- 2019 yəhaw̓, Seattle Office of Arts & Culture ARTS Gallery
- 2018 QULLIQ: In Darkness, Light, Libby Leshgold Gallery, Emily Carr University of Art and Design, Vancouver
- 2018 The Time of Things, Legacy Art Galleries, University of Victoria.
- 2017 Grunt Gallery, Vancouver
- 2017 A Sense of Site, Art Gallery of Nova Scotia
- 2017 Stitching my Landscape, Pingo National Landmark
- 2015 Custom Made, Kamloops Art Gallery
