= Ryan Harbin =

Free agent
- Pitcher
- Born: August 6, 2001 (age 25); Bartow, Florida, U.S.
- Bats: Right Throws: Right
- Stats at Baseball Reference

Ryan Thomas Harbin (born August 6, 2001) is an American professional baseball pitcher who is a free agent.

== Career ==
Harbin was drafted by the Pittsburgh Pirates in the 17th round, with the 514th overall selection, of the 2019 Major League Baseball draft. He made his professional debut with the rookie-level Gulf Coast League Pirates. Harbin did not play in a game in 2020 due to the cancellation of the minor league season because of the COVID-19 pandemic.

Harbin returned to action in 2021 with the rookie-level Florida Complex League Pirates, pitching to a 0–1 record and 7.53 ERA with 17 strikeouts across 14 1/3 innings pitched. He split the 2022 season between the FCL Pirates and Single-A Bradenton Marauders. In nine appearances for the two affiliates, Harbin posted a combined 2–0 record and 4.41 ERA with 15 strikeouts across 16 1/3 innings pitched.

In 2023, Harbin made 35 appearances out of the bullpen for Bradenton and the High-A Greensboro Grasshoppers, accumulating a 1–4 record and 3.15 ERA with 68 strikeouts and four saves across 54 1/3 innings pitched. He split the 2024 campaign between the FCL Pirates, Bradenton, and Greensboro. Harbin made 33 appearances for the three affiliates, compiling a 0–2 record and 4.98 ERA with 65 strikeouts and one save across 43 1/3 innings pitched.

Harbin split the 2025 season between the Triple-A Indianapolis Indians, Double-A Altoona Curve, and Greensboro, pitching to a cumulative 4–4 record and 4.69 ERA with 92 strikeouts and seven saves across 50 appearances (one start). On November 6, 2025, the Pirates added Harbin to their 40-man roster to prevent him from reaching minor league free agency.

On February 23, 2026, Harbin was ruled out for at least six weeks after suffering a teres major injury. He was designated for assignment by the Pirates on April 29, following the promotion of Chris Devenski. Harbin was released by Pittsburgh on May 1. However, he re-signed with the Pirates organization on a minor league contract on May 9. On July 11, he was placed on the full-season injured list ruling him out for the rest of the season. He made 1 start with the rookie level FCL Pirates throwing a third of an inning with one strikeout and an earned run (27.00 ERA). He elected free agency on November 2.
