= Colby White =

American baseball player (born 1998)

Free agent
- Pitcher
- Born: July 4, 1998 (age 27); Hattiesburg, Mississippi, U.S.
- Bats: Right Throws: Right
- Stats at Baseball Reference

Colby Ashton White (born July 4, 1998) is an American professional baseball pitcher who is a free agent.

== Amateur career ==
White graduated from West Marion High School in Foxworth, Mississippi in 2016, and then played two seasons of college baseball at Pearl River Community College. In 2018, he played collegiate summer baseball with the Cotuit Kettleers of the Cape Cod Baseball League. After his sophomore year at Pearl River, he transferred to Mississippi State University. In 2019, his only year at Mississippi State, he went 3–1 with a 3.12 ERA and 48 strikeouts over 26 innings.

== Professional career ==
=== Tampa Bay Rays ===
White was drafted by the Tampa Bay Rays in the sixth round, with the 188th overall selection, of the 2019 Major League Baseball draft.

White signed with the Rays and made his professional debut with the Hudson Valley Renegades of the Low-A New York–Penn League, going 1–0 with a 2.79 ERA and 29 strikeouts over 15 relief appearances. He did not play in a game in 2020 due to the cancellation of the minor league season because of the COVID-19 pandemic. White began the 2021 season with the Charleston RiverDogs of the Low-A East, and earned promotions to the Bowling Green Hot Rods of the High-A East, the Montgomery Biscuits of the Double-A South, and the Durham Bulls of the Triple-A East during the season. Over 43 appearances between the four affiliates, White went 4–3 with a 1.44 ERA and 104 strikeouts over 62 1/3 innings. He was subsequently named Tampa Bay's Minor League Relief Pitcher of the Year.

White underwent Tommy John surgery immediately after participating in 2022 spring training, forcing him to miss the entirety of the season. On November 15, 2022, the Rays selected his contract and added him to the 40-man roster. White was optioned to Durham to begin the 2023 season and also played for the Rookie-level Florida Complex League Rays and Bowling Green. Over 22 innings pitched for the season, he went 1–0 with a 1.64 ERA and 24 strikeouts.

White was optioned to Triple–A Durham to begin the 2024 season. In 9 games for the Bulls, he struggled to a 17.61 ERA with 10 strikeouts across 7 2/3 innings. On May 3, 2024, White was designated for assignment by the Rays.

=== New York Yankees ===
On May 9, 2024, White was claimed off waivers by the New York Yankees. He struggled to a 27.00 ERA in two games for the Double–A Somerset Patriots before he was designated for assignment on May 20. White cleared waivers and was outrighted to Somerset on May 23. In 29 total appearances for Somerset, he posted a 2-0 record and 3.34 ERA with 40 strikeouts across 32 1/3 innings pitched.

White made four appearances for Somerset in 2025, but struggled to a 12.79 ERA with five strikeouts in 6 1/3 innings pitched. White was released by the Yankees organization on April 25, 2025.
