= Katy Bindon =

Canadian academic administrator

Kathryn ("Katy") Bindon (1949 - 9 Sep 2020) was the President of Okanagan University College from 1997 to 2004. She was the only woman to hold the position.

Katy Bindon was born in Toronto, Ontario. She earned her bachelor's degree in History at Sir George Williams University in 1972 with an Honours degree in Canadian History, was awarded a Woodrow Wilson Fellowship, earned her master's degree from Queen's University in 1974; and a Ph.D. degree in 1979.

Bindon returned to Montreal in 1978 to teach history at Concordia University, where she was promoted to the rank of Associate Professor in 1983. She was appointed Principal of the School of Community and Public Affairs/Ecoles des Affaires Communautaires et Publiques in 1981. After four years, she moved to the Rector's Office as Special and Executive Assistant.

In 1986, Bindon was appointed vice-president (Academic) of Mount St. Vincent University in Halifax. In 1991, Bindon accepted the position of Principal of Sir Wilfred Grenfell College in Corner Brook, the West Coast campus of Memorial University of Newfoundland.

On 1 November 1997, Bindon become President of Okanagan University College, succeeding Dr. Bill Bowering. Between 1997 and 2004 she oversaw significant growth in the institution, including obtaining recognition from the Association of Universities and Colleges of Canada (AUCC) and the Natural Sciences and Engineering Research Council (NSERC). Under her stewardship external research funding grew from virtually nothing to $6.8 million in 2004–2005.

Along with the Chair of the OUC Board, Ian Wickett, Bindon was heavily involved in lobbying the Provincial Government for full university status for OUC. This intensive lobbying lead to strained relations between the Board and the Ministry and, as a result, the Board was fired by the Ministry and replaced with a new Board in 2001. Bindon, now along with the Chair of the new Board, Dr. George Ivany, continued her intensive lobbying efforts. Relations between the Ministry and OUC grew even more strained resulting in a government decision to dismiss the new Board in 2004 and replace it with a public administrator. At the same time, the Government announced that OUC would be dissolved, with the University of British Columbia taking over the university operations and the non-university operations becoming the basis for a new community college, which would later be named Okanagan College. Bindon was dismissed, and replaced by OUC vice-president, Dr. Peter Ricketts, for the final year of OUC's existence.

Bindon was for a time the President of The Royal University for Women (RUW, which describes itself on its home page as the first private, purpose-built, international University in the Kingdom of Bahrain dedicated solely to educating women). She was removed as president in 2007 after 18 months. Around 2012 she became program director of the Takatuf Scholars Programme, a Corporate Social Responsibility initiative of Oman Oil Company that invested in outstanding Omani youth, from preparation for higher education through completion of a four-year bachelor's degree in international placements.
