= Dasan Brown =

Canadian baseball player (born 2001)

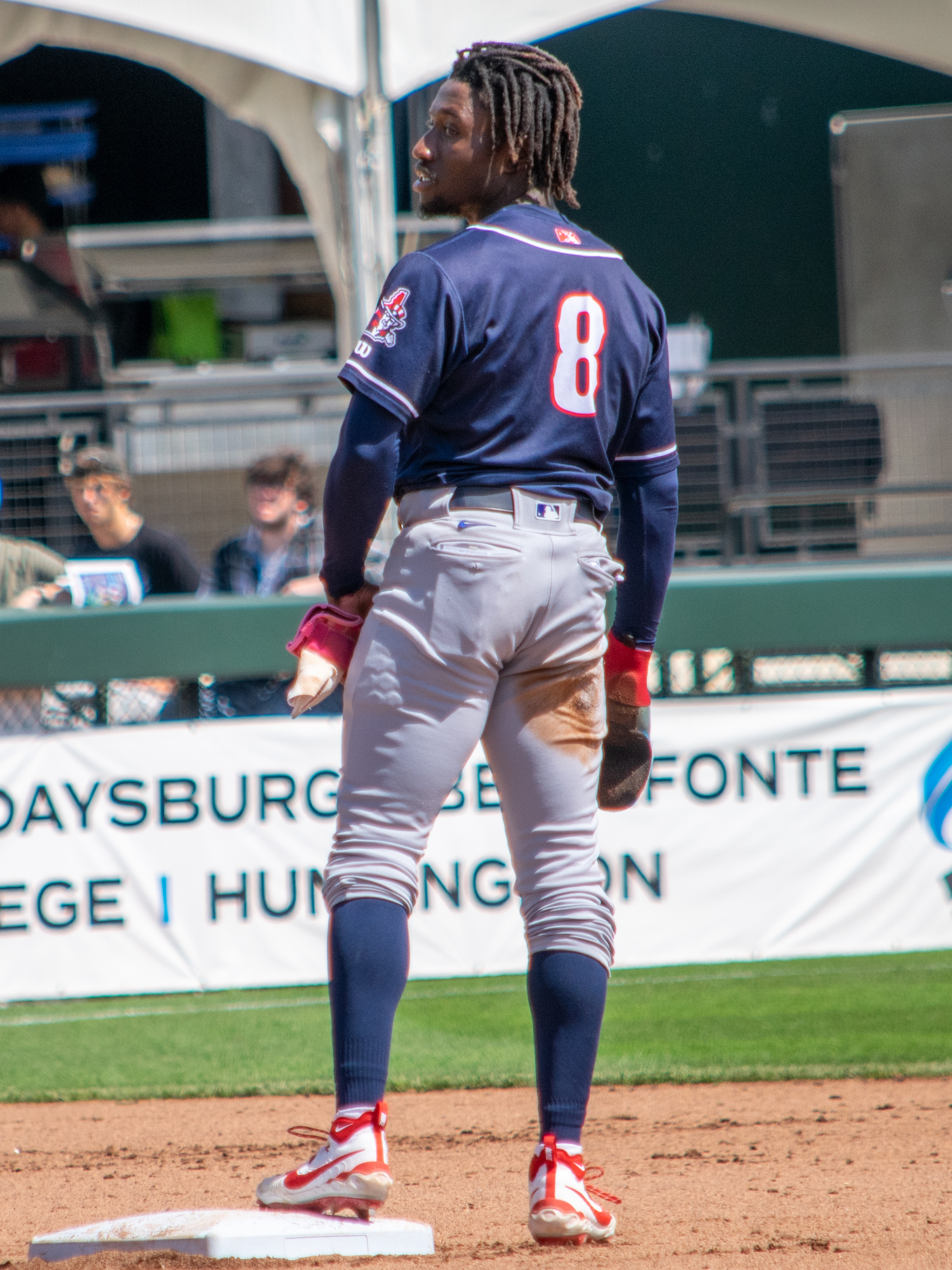
- Brown with the New Hampshire Fisher Cats in 2024

Free agent
- Outfielder
- Born: September 25, 2001 (age 24); Oakville, Ontario, Canada
- Bats: Right Throws: Right

Dasan Mykah-Anthone Brown (born September 25, 2001) is a Canadian professional baseball outfielder who is a free agent.

== Career ==
=== Toronto Blue Jays ===
Brown attended Abbey Park High School in Oakville, Ontario, Canada. He was drafted by the Toronto Blue Jays in the third round of the 2019 Major League Baseball draft. He made his professional debut that season with the Rookie-level Gulf Coast Blue Jays, recording a .222 batting average, five runs batted in (RBI), and six stolen bases in 14 games.

Brown did not play in a game in 2020 due to the cancellation of the minor league season because of the COVID-19 pandemic. He returned in 2021 to play for the Low-A Dunedin Blue Jays, hitting .212 with four home runs, 16 RBI, and 22 stolen bases in 51 games. Brown started 2022 with Dunedin before being promoted to the High-A Vancouver Canadians. In 85 total games in 2022, Brown batted .283 with six home runs, 24 RBI, and 24 stolen bases. He played the entire 2023 season with Vancouver, recording a .218 batting average, seven home runs, 39 RBI, and 26 steals in a career-high 107 games. During the offseason, Brown appeared in 20 games for the Surprise Saguaros of the Arizona Fall League (AFL).

Brown split the 2024 campaign between Vancouver and the Double-A New Hampshire Fisher Cats. In 108 appearances for the two affiliates, he batted a combined .246/.342/.381 with eight home runs, 41 RBI, and 35 stolen bases. In 2025, Brown made 101 appearances split between New Hampshire and the Triple-A Buffalo Bisons, slashing a cumulative .174/.285/.260 with four home runs, 15 RBI, and 36 stolen bases. He elected free agency following the season on November 6, 2025.

=== Milwaukee Brewers ===
On January 9, 2026, Brown signed a minor league contract with the Milwaukee Brewers. He made 51 appearances for the Double–A Biloxi Shuckers, batting .200/.347/.244 with one home run, seven RBI, and 13 stolen bases. Brown was released by the Brewers organization on June 30.
