= Ryan Smith (baseball) =

American baseball player (born 1997)

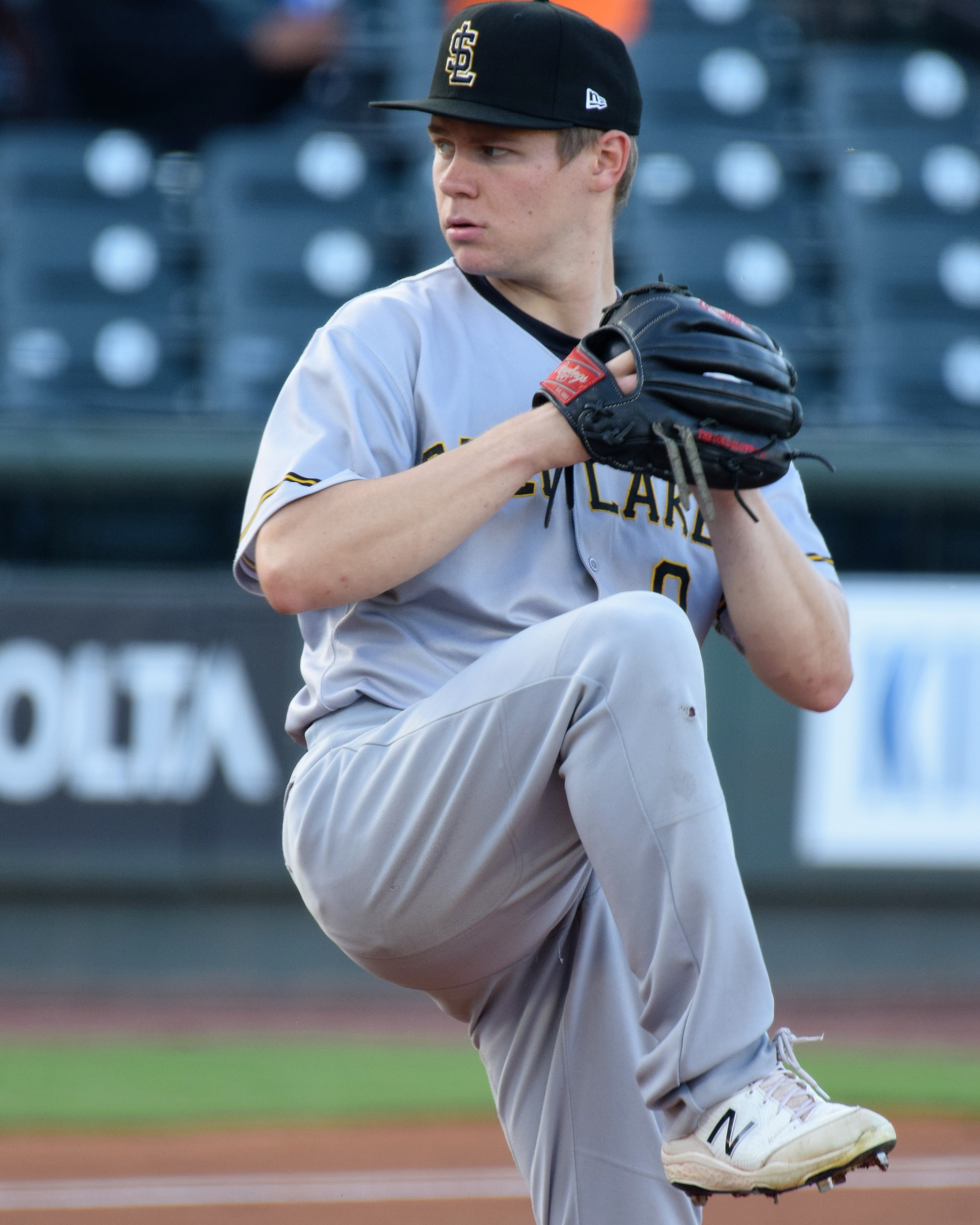
- Smith in 2022 with the Salt Lake Bees

Free agent
- Pitcher
- Born: August 13, 1997 (age 27); Queens, New York, U.S.
- Bats: Left Throws: Left

Ryan William Smith (born August 13, 1997) is an American professional baseball pitcher who is a free agent.

== Amateur career ==
Smith attended Garden City High School in Garden City, New York, and played college baseball at Princeton University. In 2018, he played collegiate summer baseball with the Cotuit Kettleers of the Cape Cod Baseball League. As a senior at Princeton in 2019, he pitched 75 2/3 innings, compiling a 3.45 ERA and 76 strikeouts.

== Professional career ==
Smith was drafted by the Los Angeles Angels in the 18th round, with the 541st overall selection, of the 2019 Major League Baseball draft. He signed with the Angels and made his professional debut with the Orem Owlz of the Rookie Advanced Pioneer League, going 0–2 with a 5.26 ERA and 37 strikeouts over 25 2/3 innings. Smith did not play a game in 2020 due to the cancellation of the minor league season because of the COVID-19 pandemic.

Smith began the 2021 season with the Inland Empire 66ers of the Low-A West and earned promotions to the Tri-City Dust Devils of the High-A West, the Rocket City Trash Pandas of the Double-A South, and the Salt Lake Bees of the Triple-A West during the season. Over 24 appearances (23 starts) between the four affiliates, Smith went 7–7 with a 4.24 ERA and 153 strikeouts across 129 1/3 innings pitched. He returned to Salt Lake for the 2022 season. Over 32 games (ten starts), Smith went 2–6 with a 6.75 ERA and 81 strikeouts over 81 2/3 innings of work.

Smith returned to Salt Lake for a third consecutive season in 2023, registering a 2-2 record and 6.48 ERA with 18 strikeouts in 14 appearances out of the bullpen. Smith was released by the Angels organization on June 5, 2023.
