= Morgan McSweeney (baseball) =

American baseball player (born 1997)

Boston Red Sox
- Pitcher
- Born: September 21, 1997 (age 28); Hudson, Massachusetts, U.S.
- Bats: Right Throws: Right

CPBL debut
- April 1, 2026, for the Rakuten Monkeys

CPBL statistics (through June 18, 2026)
- Win–loss record: 1–4
- Earned run average: 5.08
- Strikeouts: 21
- Stats at Baseball Reference

Teams
- Rakuten Monkeys (2026)

Morgan McSweeney (born September 21, 1997) is an American professional baseball pitcher in the Boston Red Sox organization. He has previously played in the Chinese Professional Baseball League (CPBL) for the Rakuten Monkeys. He was selected by the Baltimore Orioles in the 19th round of the 2019 MLB draft.

== Career ==
=== Baltimore Orioles ===
McSweeney grew up in Worcester, Massachusetts, where he attended Worcester Academy. McSweeney was drafted by the Baltimore Orioles in the 17th round, with the 498th overall selection, of the 2019 Major League Baseball draft out of Wake Forest University. He made his professional debut with the Low-A Aberdeen IronBirds, logging a 2–0 record and 1.90 ERA with 30 strikeouts across 23 2/3 innings pitched. McSweeney did not play in a game in 2020 due to the cancellation of the minor league season because of the COVID-19 pandemic.

McSweeney returned to action in 2021 with Aberdeen and the Double-A Bowie Baysox. In 30 appearances split between the two affiliates, he posted an aggregate 3–5 record and 4.43 ERA with 59 strikeouts and one save across 44 2/3 innings pitched. In 2022, McSweeney made 38 relief outings split between Bowie and the Triple-A Norfolk Tides, tallying a combined 5–4 record and 4.05 ERA with 43 strikeouts and one save over 46 2/3 innings pitched.

McSweeney was invited to major league spring training ahead of the 2023 campaign, but did not make the team to begin the regular season. He spent the entirety of the year with Triple-A Norfolk, registering a 2–0 record and 5.48 ERA with 46 strikeouts in 46 innings across 42 appearances out of the bullpen. McSweeney made 12 appearances split between Norfolk and Bowie in 2024, accumulating a 2.60 ERA with 14 strikeouts across 17 1/3 innings pitched. On July 10, 2024, McSweeney was released by the Orioles organization.

=== Gastonia Baseball Club ===
On July 31, 2024, McSweeney signed with the Gastonia Baseball Club of the Atlantic League of Professional Baseball. McSweeney started eight games down the stretch for Gastonia, registering a 2–1 record and 4.19 ERA with 35 strikeouts across 34 1/3 innings pitched.

=== Staten Island FerryHawks ===
On April 15, 2025, McSweeney signed with the Staten Island FerryHawks of the Atlantic League of Professional Baseball. McSweeney made 10 starts for Staten Island, compiling a 4–2 record and 3.00 ERA with 41 strikeouts over 54 innings of work.

=== Miami Marlins ===
On June 26, 2025, McSweeney signed a minor league contract with the Miami Marlins organization. He made 13 appearances (including 12 starts) for the Triple-A Jacksonville Jumbo Shrimp, compiling a 3–3 record and 2.21 ERA with 42 strikeouts across 61 innings pitched. McSweeney elected free agency following the season on November 6.

=== Rakuten Monkeys ===
On December 28, 2025, McSweeney signed with the Rakuten Monkeys of the Chinese Professional Baseball League. He made nine appearances (including eight starts) for Rakuten, compiling a 1–4 record and 5.08 ERA with 21 strikeouts across 44 1/3 innings pitched. McSweeney was released by the Monkeys on June 21, 2026.

=== Boston Red Sox ===
On August 12, 2026, McSweeney signed a minor league contract with the Boston Red Sox.
