= Anthony Hoopii-Tuionetoa =

American baseball player (born 2000)

Free agent
- Pitcher
- Born: August 11, 2000 (age 25); Wailuku, Hawaii, U.S.
- Bats: Right Throws: Right

Anthony David Maui La'akea Hoopii-Tuionetoa (born August 11, 2000) is an American professional baseball pitcher in the Texas Rangers organization.

== Career ==
Hoopii-Tuionetoa graduated from Henry Perrine Baldwin High School in 2018. He attended Pierce College.

=== Texas Rangers ===
The Texas Rangers selected Hoopii-Tuionetoa in the 30th round (895th overall) of the 2019 Major League Baseball draft. He did not play in a game in 2020 due to the cancellation of the minor league season because of the COVID-19 pandemic.

After the 2023 season, Hoopii-Tuionetoa pitched for the Surprise Saguaros of the Arizona Fall League.

=== Chicago White Sox ===
On May 8, 2024, the Rangers traded Hoopii-Tuionetoa to the Chicago White Sox in exchange for Robbie Grossman. He was assigned to the Double-A Birmingham Barons, where he posted an 0-2 record and 3.24 ERA with 23 strikeouts in 23 games; after being promoted to the Triple-A Charlotte Knights, he logged an 0-1 record and 13.50 ERA with eight strikeouts over nine appearances.

Hoopii-Tuionetoa was placed on the restricted list prior to the 2025 season. He was released by the White Sox organization on July 24, 2025.

=== Texas Rangers (second stint) ===
On November 26, 2025, Hoopii-Tuionetoa signed a minor league contract to return to the Texas Rangers organization. He made six scoreless appearances for the High-A Hub City Spartanburgers, recording nine scoreless innings with five strikeouts and two saves. On May 2, 2026, Hoopii-Tuionetoa was released by the Rangers organization.
