= Bailey Horn =

American baseball player (born 1998)

Detroit Tigers
- Pitcher
- Born: January 15, 1998 (age 28); Waco, Texas, U.S.
- Bats: Left Throws: Left

MLB debut
- June 29, 2024, for the Boston Red Sox

MLB statistics (through 2025 season)
- Win–loss record: 1–2
- Earned run average: 4.60
- Strikeouts: 23
- Stats at Baseball Reference

Teams
- Boston Red Sox (2024); Detroit Tigers (2025)

Bailey Christian Tant Horn (born January 15, 1998) is an American professional baseball pitcher in the Detroit Tigers organization. He has previously played in Major League Baseball (MLB) for the Boston Red Sox.

== Career ==
Horn attended West High School in West, Texas, and played college baseball at McLennan Community College and Auburn University. He was a part of back to back 3A State Championship teams (2015 & 2016) in high school. Horn also competed in the 2017 NJCAA World Series and 2019 College World Series while at MCC and Auburn respectively.

=== Chicago White Sox ===
Horn was drafted by the Chicago White Sox in the fifth round, with the 142nd overall selection, of the 2020 Major League Baseball draft. Horn made his professional debut in 2021 with the Single-A Kannapolis Cannon Ballers, and also appeared for the High-A Winston-Salem Dash.

=== Chicago Cubs ===
On July 29, 2021, the White Sox traded him to the Chicago Cubs for Ryan Tepera. He finished the year with the High-A South Bend Cubs, compiling a 4.98 ERA with 24 strikeouts across 7 games (4 starts). Horn split the 2022 campaign between South Bend and the Double-A Tennessee Smokies. In 33 appearances out of the bullpen, he registered a cumulative 2.79 ERA with 74 strikeouts and 4 saves over 51 2/3 innings of work.

Horn split the 2023 season between the Double-A Tennessee Smokies and Triple-A Iowa Cubs. In 45 relief outings between the two affiliates, he accumulated a 7–3 record and 4.21 ERA with 78 strikeouts across 62 innings. On November 14, 2023, the Cubs added Horn to their 40-man roster to protect him from the Rule 5 draft.

=== Chicago White Sox (second stint) ===
On February 27, 2024, Horn was traded back to the White Sox in exchange for Matthew Thompson. He was optioned to the Triple-A Charlotte Knights to begin the 2024 season. After struggling to an 11.32 ERA in 9 games for Triple-A Charlotte, Horn was designated for assignment on April 26.

=== Boston Red Sox ===
On April 30, 2024, Horn was traded to the Boston Red Sox in exchange for cash considerations. He was subsequently optioned to the Triple-A Worcester Red Sox. Horn was promoted to the major leagues for the first time on June 28, and made his debut the following day, against the San Diego Padres. With the major-league Red Sox, Horn appeared in 18 games, all in relief, posting a 6.50 ERA while striking out 13 batters in 18 innings and recording one win and one loss.

=== Detroit Tigers ===
==== 2025 ====
On November 22, 2024, Horn was claimed off waivers by the Detroit Tigers. He was designated for assignment following the signing of Gleyber Torres on December 27. On January 9, 2025, Horn was claimed off waivers by the St. Louis Cardinals. He was optioned to the Triple-A Memphis Redbirds to begin the season. However, Horn was designated for assignment following the signing of Phil Maton on March 13. He was traded back to the Tigers that same day in exchange for cash considerations, and optioned to the Triple-A Toledo Mud Hens. Horn made 10 appearances for Detroit, logging an 0-1 record and 1.59 ERA with 10 strikeouts across 11 1/3 innings pitched.

==== 2026 ====
Horn was placed on the 10-day injured list on to start the season while he recovered from arthroscopic elbow surgery. He was moved to the 60-day injured list on April 22, 2026, after he had to be pulled from his rehab assignment a week earlier due to a setback in his recovery. On July 17, it was announced that Horn had undergone Tommy John surgery, ending his season. Horn was released by the Tigers on November 2. On November 16, 2026, the Tigers re-signed Horn to a minor league contract and assigned him to Toledo.
