= Cayne Ueckert =

American baseball player (born 1996)

Free agent
- Pitcher
- Born: May 28, 1996 (age 29); Jasper, Texas, U.S.
- Bats: Right Throws: Right

Cayne Levi Ueckert (born May 28, 1996) is an American professional baseball pitcher who is a free agent.

== Career ==
Ueckert attended Jasper High School in Jasper, Texas, where he earned All-District honors as a senior in 2015. After high school, he played two seasons of college baseball at Panola College. After his sophomore year in 2017, he played collegiate summer baseball with the Anchorage Bucs of the Alaska Baseball League. He then transferred to McNeese State University where he went 3–3 with a 6.17 ERA, 51 strikeouts, and 33 walks over 54 innings as a senior in 2019. After the season, he was selected by the Chicago Cubs in the 27th round of the 2019 Major League Baseball draft.

Ueckert signed with the Cubs and made his professional debut with the Rookie-level Arizona League Cubs, going 0–1 with a 1.90 ERA and 26 strikeouts over 23 2/3 innings. He did not play a game in 2020 due to the cancellation of the minor league season. He began the 2021 season with the South Bend Cubs of the High-A Central, and was promoted to the Tennessee Smokies of the Double-A South after two appearances. Over 26 relief appearances between the two teams, he went 1–1 with a 1.45 ERA, 37 strikeouts, and 12 walks over 31 innings. He was a non-roster invitee for spring training in 2022. He was assigned to the Iowa Cubs of the Triple-A International League to begin the year. Over 39 games (one start), he went 3–1 with a 7.74 ERA, 63 strikeouts, and 52 walks over fifty innings. He was assigned to Tennessee for the 2023 season. Over 36 relief appearances, Ueckert went 4-3 with a 4.58 ERA and fifty strikeouts over 39 1/3 innings. In 2024, he played with Tennessee and Iowa and went 0-2 with a 5.35 ERA over 31 appearances. In 2025, he played with the Smokies and went 4-1 with a 5.46 ERA before he was released on July 17, 2025.
