= Henry Perrine Baldwin High School =

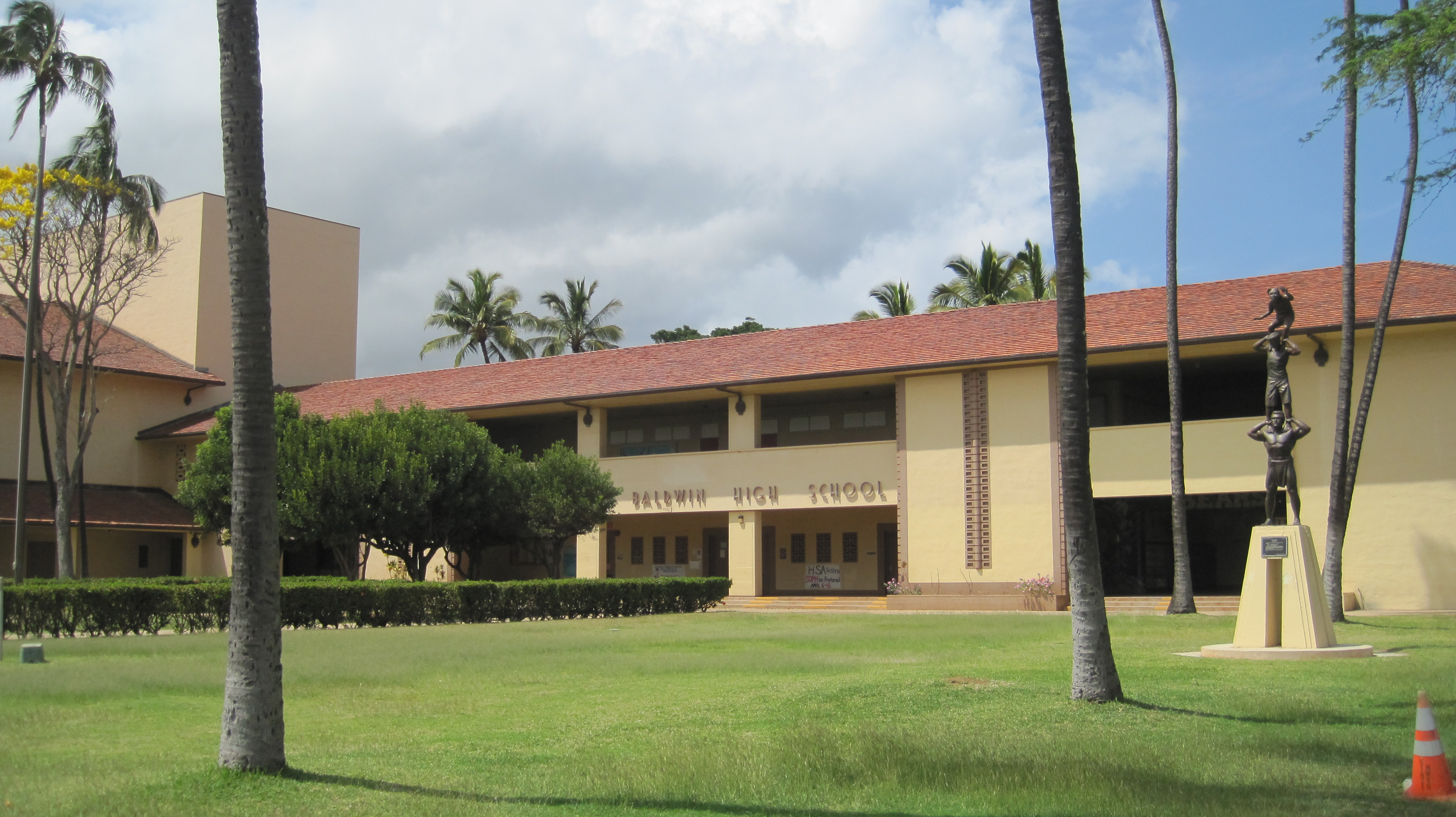
- Front entrance and lawn

Location
- 1650 Ka'ahumanu Avenue; Wailuku, Hawaii 96793; United States; 20°53′27″N 156°29′28″W

Information
- Type: Public, Co-educational
- Motto: "Personal Responsibility in Developing Excellence"
- Established: 1938
- School district: Maui District
- Principal: Keoni Wilhelm
- Teaching staff: 83.00 (FTE)
- Grades: 9-12
- Enrollment: 1,345 (2023–2024)
- Student to teacher ratio: 16.20
- Campus: Rural
- Colors: Maroon and Columbia Blue
- Athletics: Maui Interscholastic League
- Nickname: Bears
- Rival: Maui High School
- Website: http://www.baldwin.k12.hi.us
- Henry Perrine Baldwin High School
- U.S. National Register of Historic Places
- Hawaiʻi Register of Historic Places
- Area: 4.9 acres (2.0 ha)
- Architect: Henry Stewart
- Architectural style: Modern
- MPS: Maui Public Schools MPS
- NRHP reference No.: 00000667
- HRHP No.: 50-50-04-01630

Significant dates
- Added to NRHP: June 30, 2000
- Designated HRHP: June 2, 1992

Henry Perrine Baldwin High School is a public high school in Wailuku, Hawaii. Serving the major commercial, industrial, and municipal communities of the island of Maui, its curriculum offers a wide range of courses, including Advanced Placement courses. Henry Perrine Baldwin High School was accredited in 2012 by the Western Association of Schools & Colleges for a period of six years. Henry Perrine Baldwin High School is operating under School/Community-Based Management.

== Campus ==
The school opened in 1938 and moved to its current building in 1940. It was named for Henry Perrine Baldwin (1842–1911), co-founder of the Alexander & Baldwin corporation; his son, Henry Alexander Baldwin, broke ground for the 1940 school. The campus features the bronze sculpture Kū Kilakila (1997) by Honolulu-born Joel H. K. Nakila.

== Notable alumni ==
- Wehiwa Aloy, college baseball player for the Arkansas Razorbacks.
- Joe Bertram, member of the Hawaii House of Representatives
- Candis Cayne, actress and performance artist. The first transgender actress to play a recurring transgender character in prime time.
- Branden Kaupe, 4th round draft pick by the New York Mets.
- Donan Cruz, head coach for Ball State men's volleyball
- Jessie Kuhaulua, aka Takamiyama Daigorō, first foreign-born sumo wrestler to win a top division championship
- JoJo Dickson, NFL free agent linebacker
- Kendall Grove, former UFC MMA fighter
- Anthony Hoopii-Tuionetoa, professional baseball player
- John Lotulelei, NFL linebacker for the Jacksonville Jaguars
- Kaluka Maiava, NFL free agent linebacker
- Mapuana Makia, Actress, (Doogie Kamealoha, M.D, Finding Ohana, Aloha)
- Kurt Suzuki, MLB catcher for the Los Angeles Angels
- Pasoni Tasini, professional football defensive end
- Vili Tolutaʻu, Flanker for the Seattle Seawolves of Major League Rugby and United States national rugby union team

== Gallery ==
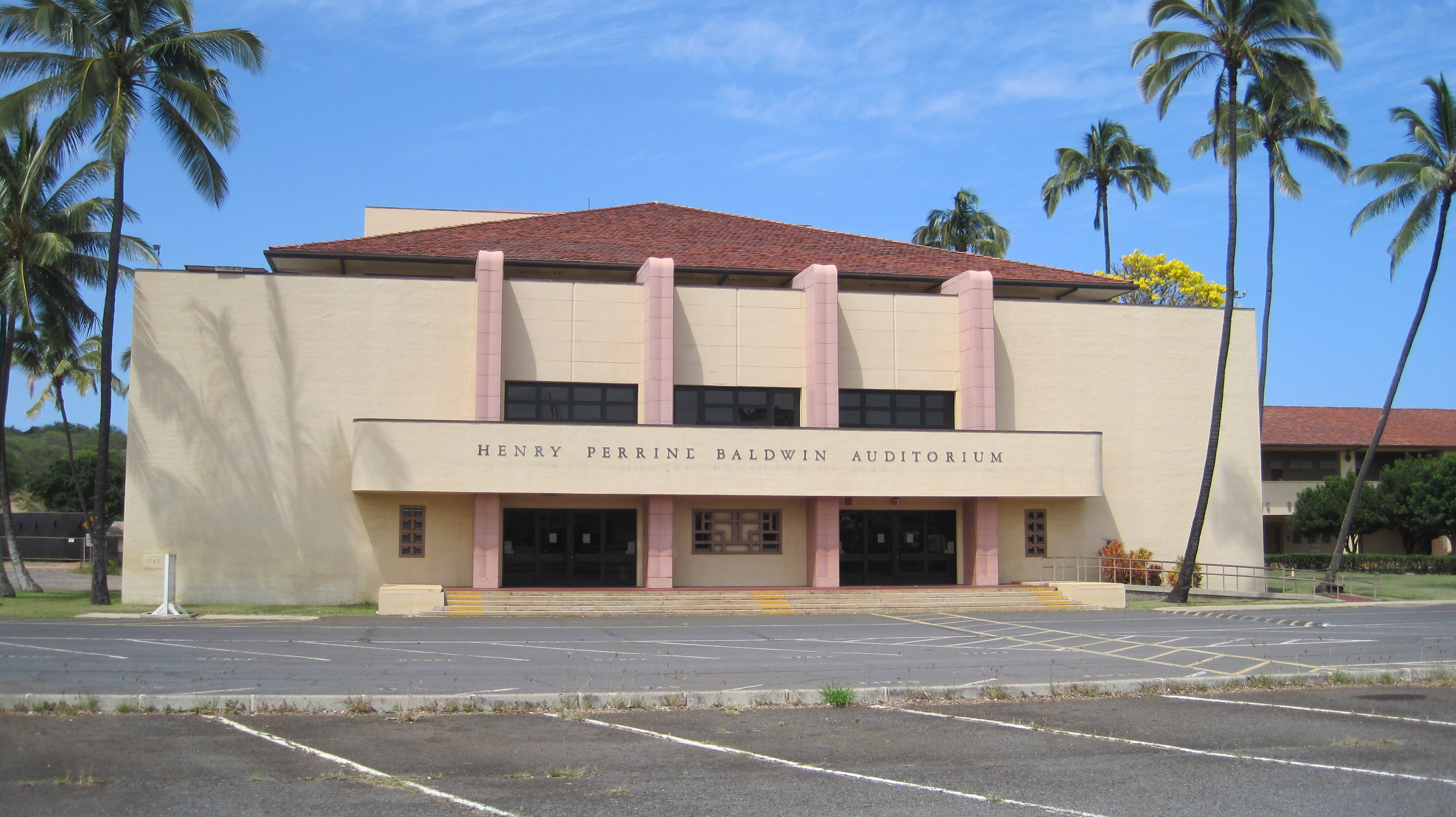
Henry Perrine Baldwin Auditorium

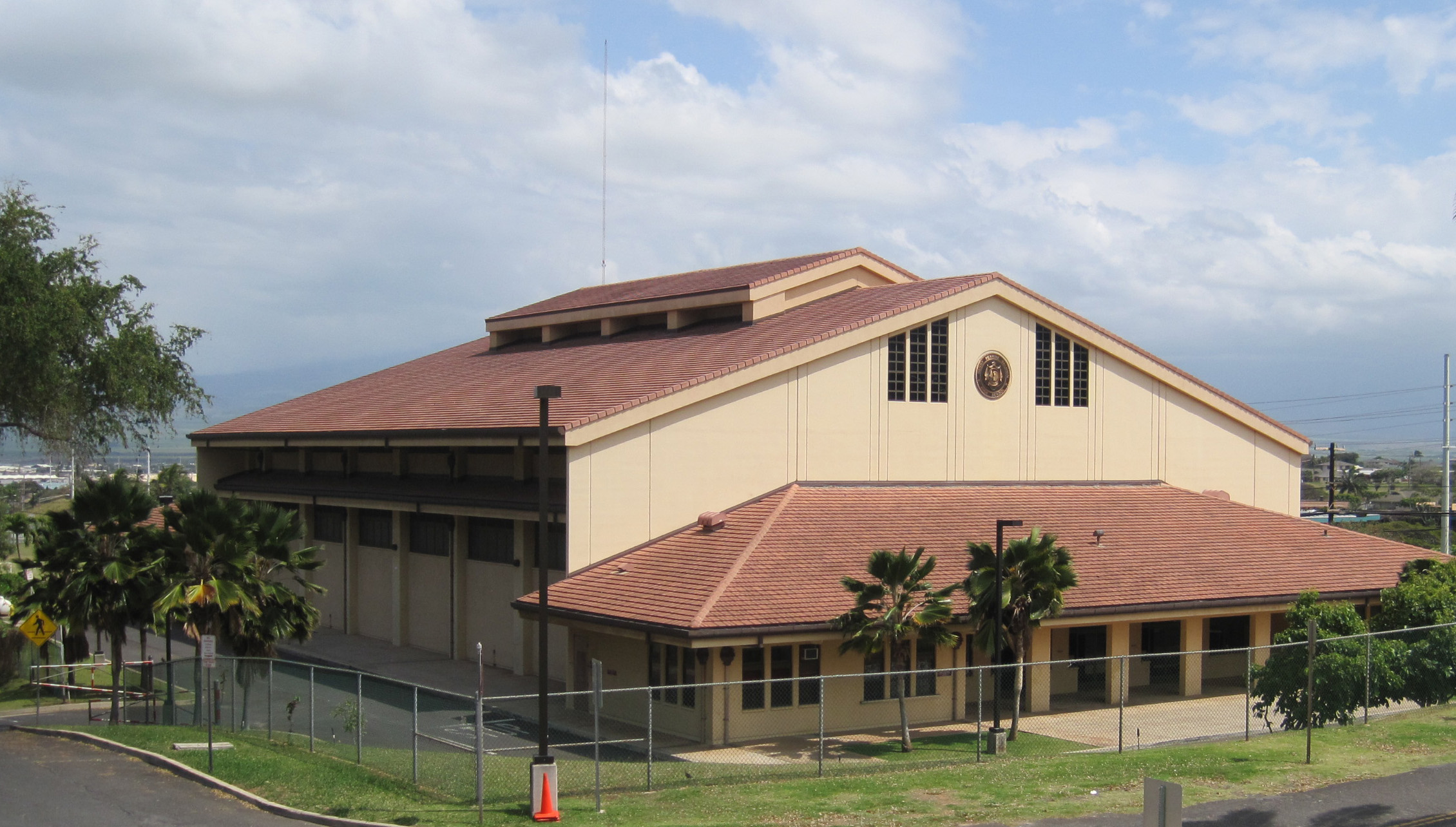
Baldwin Gymnasium
