= Ryan Tepera =

American baseball pitcher (born 1987)

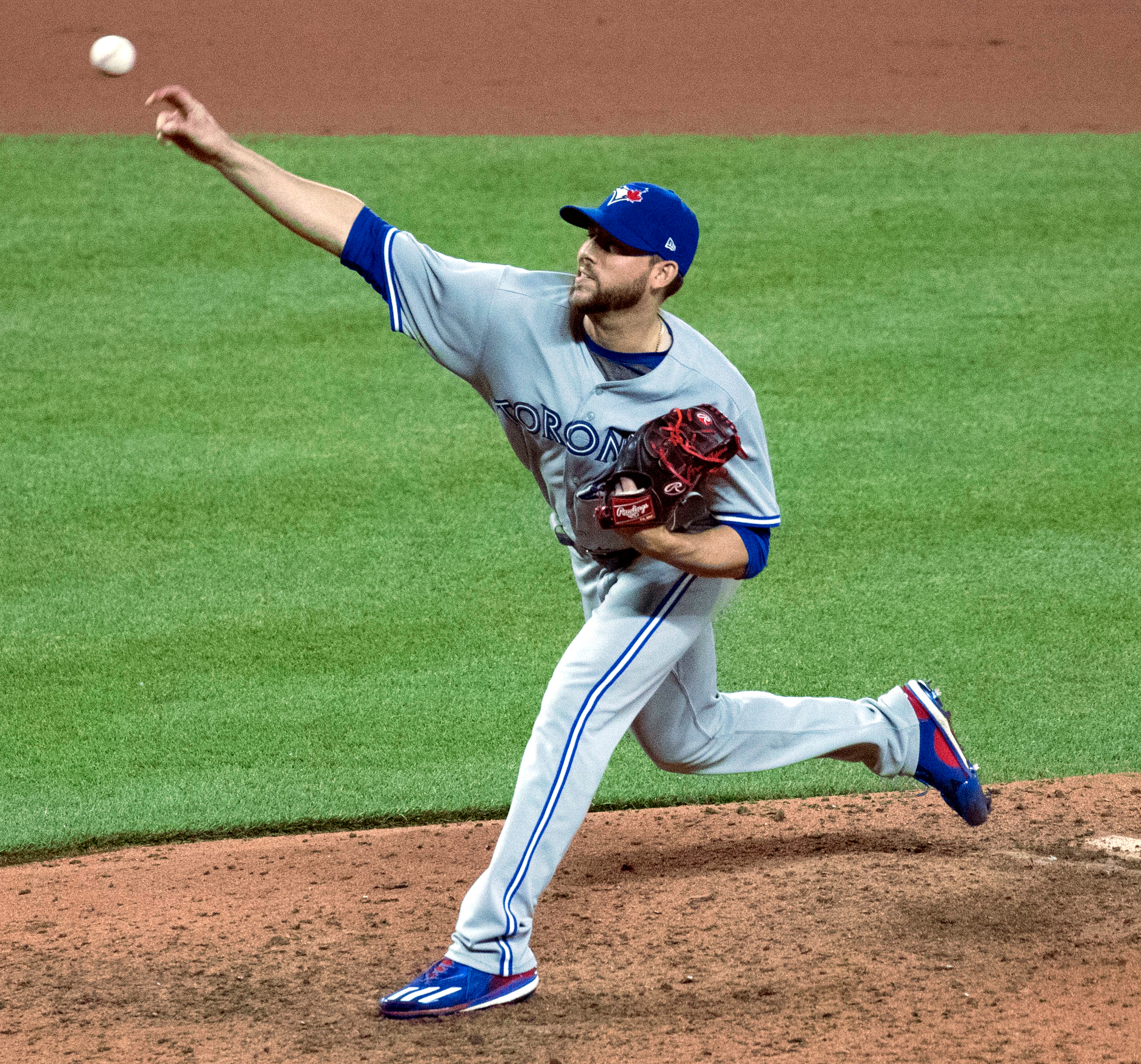
- Tepera with the Toronto Blue Jays in 2017
- Pitcher
- Born: November 3, 1987 (age 39); Houston, Texas, U.S.
- Batted: Right Threw: Right

MLB debut
- May 10, 2015, for the Toronto Blue Jays

Last MLB appearance
- July 19, 2023, for the St. Louis Cardinals

MLB statistics
- Win–loss record: 19–20
- Earned run average: 3.62
- Strikeouts: 366
- Stats at Baseball Reference

Teams
- Toronto Blue Jays (2015–2019); Chicago Cubs (2020–2021); Chicago White Sox (2021); Los Angeles Angels (2022–2023); St. Louis Cardinals (2023)

Career highlights and awards
- Pitched a combined no-hitter on June 24, 2021

Dennis Ryan Tepera (born November 3, 1987) is an American former professional baseball pitcher. He played in Major League Baseball (MLB) for the Toronto Blue Jays, Chicago Cubs, Chicago White Sox, Los Angeles Angels, and St. Louis Cardinals. He attended Brazoswood High School in Texas, and played college baseball for the Sam Houston State Bearkats.

== Amateur career ==
After graduating from Brazoswood High School in Clute, Texas, Tepera played college baseball at Blinn College before transferring to Sam Houston State University. In 2009, his senior season, he went 2–1 with a 7.33 ERA over 43 innings.

== Professional career ==
=== Toronto Blue Jays ===
==== Minor leagues ====
The Blue Jays selected Tepera in the 19th round of the 2009 Major League Baseball draft. He was assigned to the Gulf Coast League Blue Jays, and made 11 appearances for the team, including 5 starts. Tepera posted a 3–1 win–loss record, 1.72 ERA, and 42 strikeouts in 36 2/3 innings. In 2010, he was promoted to the Single-A Lansing Lugnuts, and pitched 120 innings over 24 appearances (22 starts). In total, Tepera earned a 9–6 record, 3.98 ERA, and 79 strikeouts. He played the 2011 season with the High-A Dunedin Blue Jays, posting an 11–6 record, 4.43 ERA, and 93 strikeouts in a career-high 146 1/3 innings. Tepera started the 2012 season in Dunedin, and was later promoted to the Double-A New Hampshire Fisher Cats. He struggled during the year, and finished with an 8–6 record, 5.48 ERA, and 71 strikeouts. In the offseason, Tepera played with the Salt River Rafters of the Arizona Fall League, and made 6 starts, going 1–2 with a 6.75 ERA.

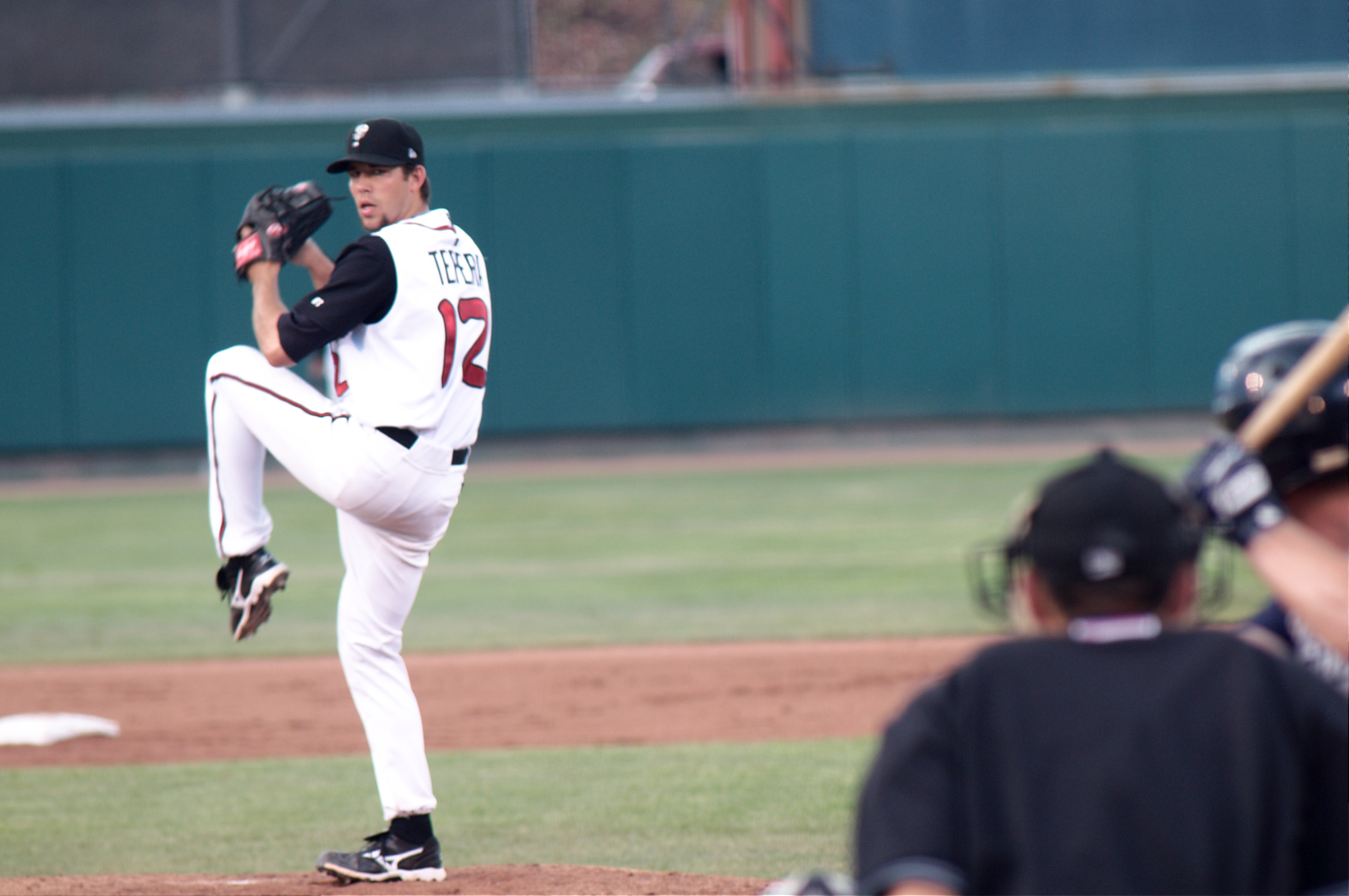
Tepera with the Lansing Lugnuts in 2010

Tepera played the entire 2013 season in Double-A New Hampshire, bouncing back with a 10–8 record, 4.50 ERA, and 105 strikeouts in 116 innings. 2014 saw Tepera make his first trip to the Triple-A Buffalo Bisons, where he pitched exclusively as a reliever. In 51 games, he posted a 7–3 record, 3.66 ERA, and 67 strikeouts in 64 innings pitched. The Blue Jays added Tepera to their 40-man roster on November 20, 2014, to protect him from the Rule 5 draft. He began the 2015 season with the Buffalo Bisons, and was promoted to the major leagues by the Blue Jays on May 8.

==== Major leagues ====
Tepera made his debut on May 10, 2015, against the Boston Red Sox. He pitched 2 innings in relief of R. A. Dickey, and did not allow a baserunner, while striking out 1. Tepera was optioned back to Buffalo on August 1, and recalled on September 1. He earned his first save on September 12, closing out a 9–5 win over the New York Yankees. Tepera was initially left off of the postseason roster, however he was added on October 10 after Brett Cecil suffered a season-ending calf injury the day prior.

After participating in 2016 Major League spring training, Tepera was announced on March 30 as one of the Blue Jays bullpen pitchers for Opening Day. However, shortly afterward the Blue Jays signed Franklin Morales and optioned Tepera to Triple-A Buffalo. On April 27, Tepera was recalled from Buffalo. After taking the loss against the San Francisco Giants on May 11, Tepera was optioned back to Triple-A Buffalo. He was recalled on May 30, and optioned again on June 5. On July 24, Tepera was recalled after Drew Storen was designated for assignment. Tepera was returned to Buffalo on July 26. He was recalled on August 10, and optioned back to Buffalo on August 23. After the Major League roster expansion on September 1, Tepera was called up by Toronto. After spring training, Tepera made the 2017 Opening Day roster. On April 21, he earned his first career win after pitching three shutout innings against the Los Angeles Angels of Anaheim. Tepera finished the 2017 season with a 3.59 ERA and 81 strikeouts over 77 2/3 innings. He began the 2018 season as the setup man to closer Roberto Osuna. He was placed on the disabled list on June 30 with elbow inflammation. Tepera finished the season with a 5–5 record in 68 games, striking out 68 in 64 2/3 innings. Tepera went into arbitration hearings with the Blue Jays in 2019 and remained the last Blue Jay to do so until Vladimir Guerrero Jr in 2025. He lost his arbitration case, and was awarded a $1,525,000 salary Friday rather than his request for $1.8 million.

=== Chicago Cubs ===
Tepera was designated for assignment on November 4, 2019. He elected free agency four days later. On December 20, he signed a one-year deal with the Chicago Cubs. On November 12, 2020, Tepera received a single vote for National League Most Valuable Player, finishing in a tie for eighteenth place. Rick Hummel, the writer who cast the vote for Tepera, indicated that it was an input error: Hummel had intended to vote for Trea Turner, but clicked the wrong name on the online form's drop-down menu. On December 2, Tepera was nontendered by the Cubs.

On February 26, 2021, Tepera re-signed with the Cubs on a one-year, $800,000 contract. On April 15, Tepera received a three-game suspension for intentionally throwing a pitch at pitcher Brandon Woodruff in a game against the Milwaukee Brewers. Tepera was named the NL Reliever of the Month for May. On June 24, 2021, Tepera pitched a combined no-hitter against the Los Angeles Dodgers along with Zach Davies, Andrew Chafin, and Craig Kimbrel.

=== Chicago White Sox ===
On July 29, 2021, Tepera was traded to the Chicago White Sox in exchange for Bailey Horn. Between the Cubs and White Sox, in 2021 Tepera had a 2.79 ERA with 74 strikeouts in 61 1/3 innings. Tepera pitched 4 2/3 innings for the White Sox in the series, allowing one run on two hits with three strikeouts.

=== Los Angeles Angels ===
On March 19, 2022, Tepera signed a two-year, $14 million contract with the Los Angeles Angels. He made his Angels debut on April 7, 2022, against the Houston Astros, pitching one inning but surrendering consecutive solo home runs to Alex Bregman and Yordan Alvarez. On April 11, 2022, he struck out the side in the 8th inning in a 6–2 win over the Marlins. On April 20, Tepera pitched 2.0 perfect innings in a combined 1-hit 1-walk shutout in relief of starting pitcher Shohei Ohtani. He finished the year making 59 appearances for the Angels, posting a 3.61 ERA with 47 strikeouts and 6 saves across 57.1 innings pitched.

In 2023, Tepera again worked out of the Angels bullpen, but struggled to 7.27 ERA across 10 games. After allowing a pair of solo home runs to the Cleveland Guardians the day prior, Tepera was designated for assignment on May 14, 2023. He was released by the Angels on May 19.

=== Texas Rangers ===
On June 14, 2023, Tepera signed a minor league contract with the Texas Rangers organization. He made 7 scoreless appearances for the Triple–A Round Rock Express, striking out 11 in 8.0 innings of work. On July 14, Tepera exercised the opt–out clause in his contract and became a free agent.

=== St. Louis Cardinals ===
On July 17, 2023, the St. Louis Cardinals signed Tepera to a major-league contract and immediately activated him. He made only two appearances for St. Louis, surrendering two runs on three hits and one walk with one strikeout in two innings pitched. On July 20, the Cardinals designated Tepera for assignment after Tyler O'Neill was activated from the injured list. He was released by St. Louis on July 26.

== Personal life ==
Tepera married his wife, Chelsea, in 2021. The couple welcomed their son Cohen in November 2022.

Awards and achievements
Preceded by Corey Kluber	No-hit game June 24, 2021 (with Davies, Chafin & Kimbrel)	Succeeded by Tyler Gilbert
