= Andrew Misiaszek =

American baseball player (born 1997)

Long Island Ducks – No. 37
- Pitcher
- Born: August 24, 1997 (age 28); Oceanside, New York, U.S.
- Bats: Right Throws: Left

Andrew Jacob Misiaszek (born August 24, 1997) is an American professional baseball pitcher for the Long Island Ducks of the Atlantic League of Professional Baseball. He was selected by the Cleveland Indians in the 2019 MLB draft.

== Career ==
Misiaszek attended Northeastern University. In 2018, he played collegiate summer baseball with the Harwich Mariners of the Cape Cod Baseball League and was named a league all-star.

=== Cleveland Indians / Guardians ===
Misiaszek was drafted by the Cleveland Indians in the 32nd round, with the 970th overall selection, of the 2019 Major League Baseball draft. He split his first professional season between the rookie-level Arizona League Indians and Low-A Mahoning Valley Scrappers, accumulating a 4-2 record and 4.28 ERA with 30 strikeouts in 17 games. Misiaszek did not play in a game in 2020 due to the cancellation of the minor league season because of the COVID-19 pandemic.

Misiaszek returned to action in 2021 with the Single-A Lynchburg Hillcats, High-A Lake County Captains, and Double-A Akron RubberDucks. In 32 appearances split between the three affiliates, he pitched to a cumulative 4-2 record and 3.47 ERA with 87 strikeouts and one save across 62 1/3 innings pitched. Misiaszek split the 2022 campaign between Akron and the Triple-A Columbus Clippers, logging a combined 5-2 record and 2.04 ERA with 90 strikeouts across 61 2/3 innings pitched.

Misiaszek underwent Tommy John surgery in June 2023, causing him to miss the entirety of the season as a result. Upon returning in late 2024, he recorded a 4-1 record and 3.80 ERA with 29 strikeouts in 21 games for Columbus and the rookie-level Arizona Complex League Guardians. Misiaszek made 23 appearances out of the bullpen for Columbus in 2025, but struggled to a 7.31 ERA with 27 strikeouts and two saves across 28 1/3 innings pitched. Misiaszek was released by the Guardians organization on August 11, 2025.

=== Long Island Ducks ===
On August 27, 2025, Misiaszek signed with the Long Island Ducks of the Atlantic League of Professional Baseball.
