= Trevor Brigden =

Canadian baseball player (born 1995)

Winnipeg Goldeyes – No. 25
- Pitcher
- Born: September 20, 1995 (age 30); North York, Ontario, Canada
- Bats: Left Throws: Right

Trevor Harrison Brigden (born September 20, 1995) is a Canadian professional baseball pitcher for the Winnipeg Goldeyes of the American Association of Professional Baseball.

== Career ==
Brigden attended Okanagan College, where he played college baseball. He also played collegiate summer baseball for the Kelowna Falcons of the West Coast League.

=== Tampa Bay Rays ===
The Tampa Bay Rays drafted Brigden in the 17th round, with the 518th overall selection, of the 2019 Major League Baseball draft, making him the first player to be drafted from Okanagan. He made his professional debut for the rookie–level Princeton Rays, posting a 2.45 ERA in 10 games. Brigden did not play in a game in 2020 due to the cancellation of the minor league season because of the COVID-19 pandemic.

Brigden played for the Canadian national baseball team in the 2020 Olympic qualifiers. After he returned from the qualifiers, he was promoted from the Single–A Charleston RiverDogs to the High–A Bowling Green Hot Rods. In 31 appearances split between Charleston, Bowling Green, and the Triple–A Durham Bulls, he compiled a 7–2 record and 4.59 ERA with 69 strikeouts across 49 innings pitched.

Brigden split the 2022 season between the Double–A Montgomery Biscuits and Durham, accumulating a 5–5 record and 3.05 ERA with 80 strikeouts and 3 saves. The Rays invited him to spring training in 2023. Brigden spent the entirety of 2023 with Durham, making 44 appearances and recording a 3.46 ERA with 95 strikeouts and 2 saves across 78 innings.

Brigden began the 2024 campaign back with Durham, compiling a 3–1 record and 7.64 ERA with 45 strikeouts across 35 1/3 innings pitched. On August 5, 2024, Brigden was released by the Rays organization.

=== Winnipeg Goldeyes ===
On February 26, 2025, Brigden signed with the Winnipeg Goldeyes of the American Association of Professional Baseball. In 16 appearances for Winnipeg, Brigden compiled a 2-2 record and 0.98 ERA with 20 strikeouts and two saves across 18 1/3 innings pitched.

=== Bravos de León ===
On July 6, 2025, Brigden's contract was purchased by the Bravos de León of the Mexican League. In two appearances for León, he struggled to an 0-1 record and 19.29 ERA with no strikeouts across 2 1/3 innings pitched. Brigden was released by the Bravos on July 11.

=== Winnipeg Goldeyes (second stint) ===
On July 18, 2025, Brigden re-signed with the Winnipeg Goldeyes of the American Association of Professional Baseball.

== International career ==
In 2023, Brigden pitched for the Canadian national baseball team in the 2023 World Baseball Classic.
