= Matthew Thompson (baseball) =

American baseball player (born 2000)

Cleburne Railroaders
- Pitcher
- Born: August 11, 2000 (age 26); Houston, Texas, U.S.
- Bats: Right Throws: Right

Matthew Philip Thompson (born August 11, 2000) is an American professional baseball pitcher who most recently played for the Cleburne Railroaders of the American Association of Professional Baseball.

== Amateur career ==
Thompson was born in Houston, Texas and grew up in Cypress, Texas, where attended Cypress Ranch High School. After his junior year, he played in the Perfect Game All-American Classic and the Under Armour All-America Game. Thompson finished his senior season with a 13–0 record and a 0.87 ERA with 124 strikeouts.

== Professional career ==
=== Chicago White Sox ===
Thompson was drafted by the Chicago White Sox in the second round of the 2019 Major League Baseball draft. After signing with the team, he was assigned to the Arizona League White Sox, where he made two one-inning appearances. After the 2020 minor league season was canceled due as a result of the COVID-19 pandemic, Thompson was added to the White Sox's alternate training site.

Thompson was assigned to the Low-A Kannapolis Cannon Ballers for the 2021 season. Over 19 starts, he went 2–8 with a 5.90 ERA and 77 strikeouts over 71 2/3 innings.

=== Chicago Cubs ===
On February 27, 2024, Thompson was traded to the Chicago Cubs in exchange for Bailey Horn. In 26 appearances (23 starts) split between the Double-A Tennessee Smokies and Triple-A Iowa Cubs, he compiled an aggregate 5-6 record and 4.77 ERA with 99 strikeouts across 105 2/3 innings pitched. Thompson was released by the Cubs organization on February 26, 2025.

=== Cleburne Railroaders ===
On March 3, 2025, Thompson signed with the Cleburne Railroaders of the American Association of Professional Baseball. He was released later that season.
