= Okanagan University College =

- Type: public, post-secondary educational institution - University College
- Active: c. 1990–30 June 2005
- Location: Kelowna, British Columbia, Canada; 49.8626°N 119.4806°W

Okanagan University College (OUC) was a public, post-secondary educational institution (c. 1990 to 30 June 2005) based in Kelowna, British Columbia, Canada. It evolved from Okanagan College (1965 to c. 1990), and the college's predecessor, the B.C. Vocational School (1963–1965). On 30 June 2005, OUC was split to create two new institutions, a new Okanagan College and UBC Okanagan.

== History ==
In the 1980s, a Kelowna community group began a concerted effort, lobbying the British Columbia provincial government for better access to undergraduate university programs. Their campaign, "Getting There By Degrees", facilitated a change in Okanagan College's mandate, allowing the college to offer undergraduate degree programs to students in the Okanagan region. The college informally adopted the new name, Okanagan University College (OUC) in 1992. This name was adopted as the institution's legal name in 1995.

Although the degree programs were mostly based on a new, North Kelowna campus which opened its doors to students in January 1993, the first degrees were awarded earlier, on 11 June 1991. Initially, students completed their degrees through collaborations with the University of British Columbia (UBC) and the University of Victoria, and the degrees were granted in the names of the university collaborators (e.g., "a Bachelor of Science from University of British Columbia, at Okanagan University College"). In 1998 OUC began granting degrees under its own authority.

New faculty in the degree programs continued to lobby for changes in the institution's mandate, eventually helping to establish a new community group, "University 2000", with the slogan "OU? Oh yes! Full University Status for OUC". The goals of this group were to further expand the university college's postsecondary role, principally by adding graduate studies and research to OUC's mandate. The growth of the degree programs, the expansion of the North Kelowna Campus, and the activities of this lobby created some tensions between degree-program faculty, largely based at North Kelowna, and other parts of the institution. Some faculty favoured splitting the institution into a new university and a new community college.

Although OUC's initial progress had been hampered by not having a research mandate, and delays in obtaining recognition from the Association of Universities and Colleges of Canada (AUCC) and Natural Sciences and Engineering Research Council (NSERC), OUC faculty had rapidly developed a solid reputation in the research community. External research funding, for example, at OUC grew from less than $1 million in 2002–2003 to $6.8 million in 2004–2005. OUC research funding greatly outstripped that of the other university colleges in British Columbia (Cariboo University College (now Thompson Rivers University), Malaspina University College (now Vancouver Island University), Kwantlen University College (now Kwantlen Polytechnic University, and University College of the Fraser Valley) (now University of the Fraser Valley). At the same time, OUC maintained an enviable reputation for the quality of its educational programs, and the commitment of its faculty to teaching.

In May 2001 OUC and the Okanagan University College Faculty Association signed a university-style contract for faculty, instituting rank, tenure and promotion. The contract was concluded in the window of opportunity made possible by the ouster of the NDP provincial government. The new Liberal government fired the OUC board, but the new Liberal-appointed board reviewed the contract, determined that it was sound, and implemented the agreement.

In December 2002 the British Columbia Progress Board submitted a report to the provincial government, recognising the need to further expand postsecondary opportunities in the valley. The progress board, chaired by UBC president Martha Piper, recommended that the province consider extending "the mandate of an existing provincial University to Kelowna...", and "the mandate of the British Columbia Institute of Technology to Kelowna and Prince George..."

The provincial government responded by quietly beginning negotiations with the University of British Columbia. It was noted by many people, including opposition MLAs in the BC Legislature, that UBC President Martha Piper was in a clear conflict of interest in using her position on the Progress Board to position her own University to take over OUC's university programs. On 17 March 2004, the province and the University of British Columbia held a closed joint press conference at the Grand Hotel in downtown Kelowna, announcing that OUC would be dissolved, with OUC's North Kelowna Campus being transferred to University of British Columbia.

OUC's degree programs were largely adopted, with minor modification, by University of British Columbia. UBC also introduced new degree programs that had not existed at OUC. The other components of Okanagan University College (including the entire business administration program, degree included) were allocated to the new college. The agreement allowed for a 15-month transition, before the changes would be formally adopted.

Although rumours circulated widely, OUC had not been formally informed in any way of the change in advance. The press conference was not open to the OUC community, including OUC's president. Never before had an AUCC member university secretly negotiated with a government to take over a sister AUCC member institution. The OUC board was dismissed, being replaced by a public administrator (initially Jim Soles, Assistant Deputy Minister, Ministry of Advanced Education; and later Dr. Peter Meekison). OUC President Dr. Katy Bindon was dismissed, being replaced by OUC vice-president academic, Dr. Peter Ricketts, for the final year of OUC's existence.

On 1 July 2005 the North Kelowna campus became UBC Okanagan, a new campus of the University of British Columbia. Although OUC's applied degrees in Business and Computer Information Systems remained with the College, the new college resurrected the name Okanagan College – this name reflecting the loss of most of OUC's degree programs.
