= J.J. Goss =

Free agent
- Pitcher
- Born: December 25, 2000 (age 25); Cypress, Texas, U.S.
- Bats: Right Throws: Right
- Stats at Baseball Reference

Jamey Russell Goss (born December 25, 2000) is an American professional baseball pitcher who is a free agent.

== Amateur career ==
Goss attended Cypress Ranch High School in Cypress, Texas. In 2019, his senior year, he went 11–2 with a 0.64 ERA. He had committed to play college baseball at Texas A&M University. Goss was a key contributor in the 2019 Perfect Game All American Classic, pitching a 1-2-3 top of the fifth, helping the West squad secure a 4–2 victory.

== Professional career ==
Considered one of the top prospects for the 2019 Major League Baseball draft, Goss was selected by the Tampa Bay Rays with the 36th overall pick in the Competitive Balance Round A. He signed for $2.05 million and made his professional debut with the Rookie-level Gulf Coast Rays. Over nine games (eight starts), he went 1–3 with a 5.82 ERA, striking out 16 over 17 innings. He did not play a minor league game in 2020 since the season was cancelled due to the COVID-19 pandemic. Goss returned to the Gulf Coast Rays in 2021, pitching a total of 10 1/3 innings while recovering from a shoulder injury.

Goss was assigned to the Single-A Charleston RiverDogs for the 2022 season. Over 25 starts, he went 4–5 with a 4.00 ERA and 101 strikeouts over 101 1/3 innings. He played the 2023 season with the High-A Bowling Green Hot Rods and pitched to a 6-6 record and 5.21 ERA over 22 starts. In 2024, Goss appeared in 17 games in relief for Bowling Green, going 2-0 with a 2.35 ERA.

Goss opened the 2025 season with the Double-A Montgomery Biscuits. In 33 appearances for the Biscuits, he compiled a 4-3 record and 3.38 ERA with 31 strikeouts and 11 saves over 40 innings of work. Goss elected free agency following the season on November 6, 2025.

On December 12, 2025, Goss signed a minor league contract with the Athletics. He played the 2026 season with the Double-A Midland RockHounds and had a 2-3 record, a 5.23 ERA, and 36 strikeouts over 51 2/3 innings. He elected free agency on November 2.
