= Federation of Canadian Secondary Students =

Canadian charitable organization

Federation of Canadian Secondary Students Fédération des Élèves du Secondaire au Canada
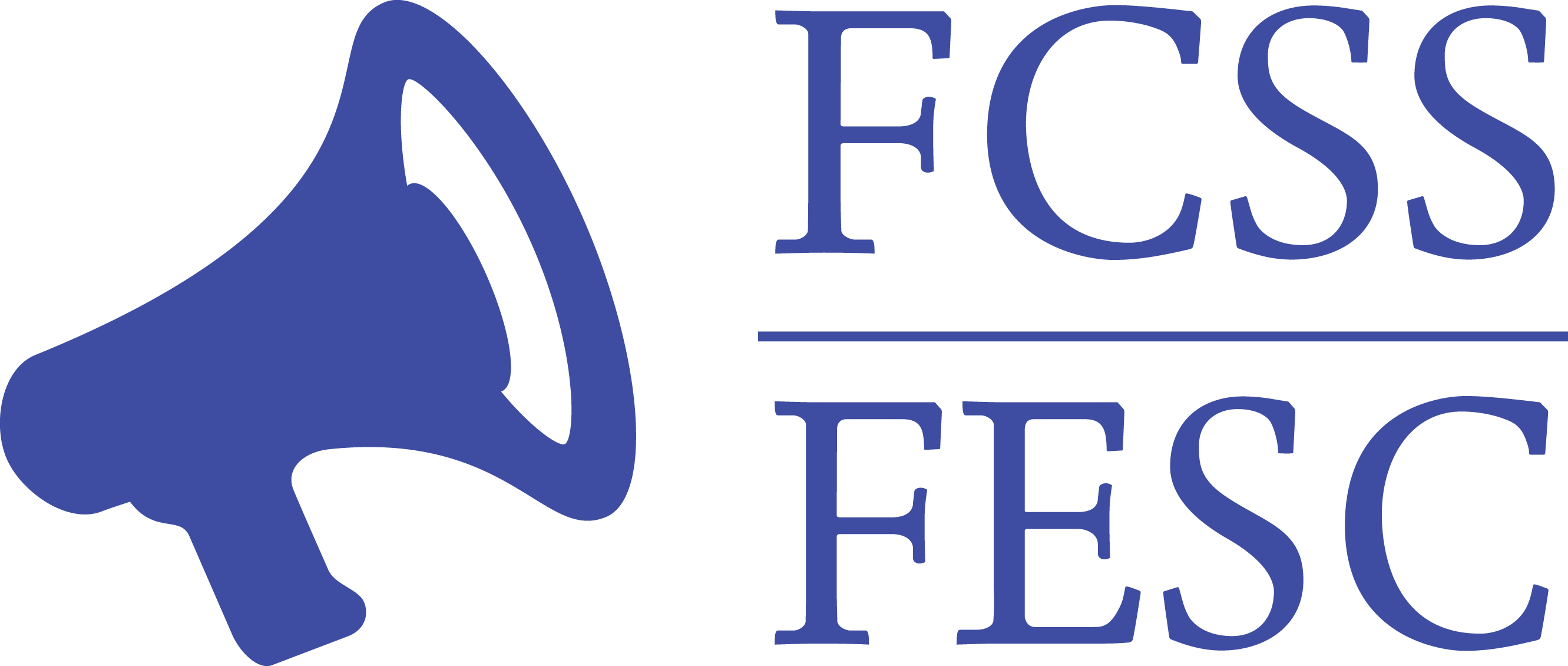
- Type: Public; Nonprofit organization
- Industry: Education
- Founded: 2012
- Headquarters: Toronto, Ontario, Canada
- Area served: Canada
- Key people: Victor Jiang (Executive Director); Husayn Jamal (Chairperson, Board of Directors); Bruce Yu (Vice-Chairperson, Board of Directors)
- Number of employees: ▲40
- Website: www.fcss-fesc.ca

The Federation of Canadian Secondary Students, French: Fédération des élèves du secondaire au Canada (FCSS-FESC) is a Canadian federally registered charitable organization.

The organization advocates for secondary school students in Canada and was formed by a group of grade 12 students at Abbey Park High School in Oakville in response to the Putting Students First Act (formerly Bill 115) on September 11, 2012.

The organization incorporated in 2014, amended its registered name to the FCSS-FESC in 2016 and registered as a charity with the Canada Revenue Agency in 2017. Prior to October 2015, the FCSS-FESC was formerly known as the Organization of Ontario Secondary Students / L’Organisation pour les élèves du secondaire de l'Ontario (OOSS-OESO) and carried out the work of advocating for students in the province of Ontario.

== History ==
As a result of the looming employment action and risk of strikes by teachers and educational staff caused by Bill 115, the Organization of Ontario Secondary Students (OOSS) launched a two-fold protest plan that would see secondary students engage in a group petition action that would be sent to the provincial ministry of education and the Ontario Secondary School Teachers' Federation (OSSTF), the union representing secondary teachers.

As the dispute between the provincial Ministry of Education, secondary school teachers (via their union), and public school board continued into 2013, the Organization of Ontario Secondary Students launched a province-wide initiative called "Sport Your Extra-Curricular Day" which encouraged secondary students from across Ontario to wear their official school spirit attire to support the reinstatement of extra-curricular activities in Ontario schools. The event was organized completely by secondary students from Abbey Park High School but later spread to over 40 schools in the province.

In early February 2013, Katie Fettes of the FCSS-FESC engaged in a two-hour meeting with the President of the OSSTF, Ken Coran. The meeting was held in an attempt to reconcile the reasons for why teachers were withholding extra-curricular activities. Fettes further emphasized that "the school culture is missing," before continuing to describe the hostility felt by students against teachers.

== Advocacy after Bill 115 ==
As in-school extra-curricular activities were planned to be reintroduced in March 2013, the OOSS launched Operation Save Our Schools to draw attention to the arbitration model to prevent future labour disputes from affecting the learning environment for students and to help educate the public on the importance of extra-curricular activities in schools as a vital part of secondary education. The operation involved consultations with students across the province and the drafting of an open letter to the provincial government to outline the importance of extra-curricular activities and the need for an arbitration model.

In March 2013, the OOSS launched Operation Save Our Schools or Operation SOS, an open petition on behalf of the students, teachers, parents, and trustees of Ontario, to push for arbitration so that labour disputes affecting the learning environment for students will not come to light again. After the crisis, the OOSS formally organized as a not-for-profit organization and refocused its mission towards providing information and services to students.

This led to the launch of the Inspire, Collaborate, and Excel Program, and as of November 2015, the OOSS relaunched as the Federation of Canadian Secondary Students / Fédération des élèves du secondaire au Canada (FCSS-FESC).

In the 2016-2017 year, the FCSS-FESC launched a new initiative focused on establishing a set of fundamental rights for students across Canada. Known as the Student Bill of Rights (SBOR), the FCSS-FESC engaged in multiple consultations and meetings with relevant parties to refine and produce the Bill, and discussed recognition and areas of improvements with the Ontario Ministry of Education.

The organization expanded beyond Ontario, opening branches in Alberta, British Columbia, Quebec, and Newfoundland and Labrador in 2015 and 2016. As the FCSS-FESC became a registered charity in 2017, new programs such as Elevate and Project Demystify, were also launched to meet the needs of Canada's diverse student population. At present, the organization continues to strive to advocate and best represent students' views in secondary schools and CÉGEPs across Canada.

== Current Programs ==
=== Canadian Charter of Learners' Rights (CCLR) ===
The Canadian Charter of Learners’ Rights (CCLR), formerly known as the Student Bill of Rights is a policy document that outlines 5 essential rights that the FCSS-FESC believes all Canadian students should have. In February 2020, the FCSS-FESC hosted a press conference at Queen's Park with the endorsement of Ontario MPP Peggy Sattler.

=== Elevate ===
Elevate is an FCSS-FESC Program that focuses on recognizing issues affecting student mental health and providing resources to help students tackle them. On April 7, 2018, Elevate hosted a Mental Wellness Seminar at the Albert McCormick Community Centre and has continued to organize virtual mental health webinars for students. On December 21, 2020, Elevate launched the Elevate Podcast, in which members of the Elevate team share their stories related to secondary school and transition to post-secondary life.

=== Project Demystify ===
Project Demystify is an FCSS-FESC program that aims to make policies relevant to Canadian students more accessible and understandable. Members of the committee conduct thorough research on education policies to answer student questions and address misconceptions. Through infographics and images, Project Demystify helps to facilitate communication and transparency between educational institutions and students.

=== AIM ===
The AIM (Achieve, Inspire, Motivate) program is involved in planning and hosting the annual AIM Conference, a series of free career conferences to help students understand post-secondary and professional pathways. Formerly known as ICE, AIM allows students to explore career paths, earn from renowned professionals, and network with like-minded peers.
