= John Lotulelei =

American football player (born 1991)

No. 46, 47, 53, 55, 58
- Position: Linebacker

Personal information
- Born: December 4, 1991 (age 34); Kihei, Hawaii, U.S.
- Listed height: 5 ft 11 in (1.80 m)
- Listed weight: 235 lb (107 kg)

Career information
- High school: Wailuku (HI) Baldwin
- College: UNLV
- NFL draft: 2013: undrafted

Career history
- Seattle Seahawks (2013); Jacksonville Jaguars (2013–2015); Oakland Raiders (2015); Dallas Cowboys (2017)*; San Diego Fleet (2019)
- * Offseason or practice squad member only

Career NFL statistics
- Total tackles: 12
- Forced fumbles: 1
- Stats at Pro Football Reference

John Taufa Lotulelei (born December 4, 1991) is an American former professional football player who was a linebacker in the National Football League (NFL). He played college football for the UNLV Rebels.

== Early life ==
Lotulelei attended Henry Perrine Baldwin High School. He accepted a football scholarship from UNLV.

== Professional career ==
Pre-draft measurables
Height	Weight	Arm length	Hand span	40-yard dash	10-yard split	20-yard split	20-yard shuttle	Three-cone drill	Vertical jump	Broad jump	Bench press
5 ft 11 3/8 in (1.81 m)	233 lb (106 kg)	32 3/8 in (0.82 m)	10 5/8 in (0.27 m)	4.84 s	1.66 s	2.78 s	4.30 s	6.91 s	35.5 in (0.90 m)	9 ft 9 in (2.97 m)	25 reps
All values from NFL Combine

=== Seattle Seahawks ===
Lotulelei was signed as an undrafted free agent by the Seattle Seahawks after the 2013 NFL draft on April 27.

On October 2, 2013, Lotulelei was released by the Seahawks to make room for quarterback B. J. Daniels. Lotulelei made Seattle's 53-man roster as an undrafted free agent from UNLV and had played in two games, making three tackles overall. Seattle paid Lotulelei a signing bonus of $25,000 last spring, the highest given to any undrafted free agent, and Lotulelei was an early training camp standout.

=== Jacksonville Jaguars ===
On October 3, 2013, Lotulelei was claimed off waivers by the Jacksonville Jaguars. He was waived/injured on August 2, 2014 and was subsequently placed on injured reserve. On August 3, 2014, he was placed on injured reserve. On October 10, 2015, he was waived. On October 12, 2015, he was placed on injured reserve. On October 16, 2015, he was waived from injured reserve.

=== Oakland Raiders ===
On November 25, 2015, Lotulelei was signed to the Raiders' practice squad. On December 23, 2015, the Oakland Raiders promoted Lotulelei to the 53 man roster and placed defensive end Mario Edwards Jr. on the Injured Reserve.

On September 3, 2016, Lotulelei was released by the Raiders as part of final roster cuts.

=== Dallas Cowboys ===
On January 3, 2017, Lotulelei signed a reserve/future contract with the Dallas Cowboys. He was waived/injured on August 25, 2017 and placed on injured reserve.

=== San Diego Fleet ===
On November 9, 2018, Lotulelei signed with the San Diego Fleet of the Alliance of American Football (AAF). The league ceased operations in April 2019.

=== The Spring League ===
Lotulelei was selected by the Jousters of The Spring League during its player selection draft on October 12, 2020.

== Personal life ==
Lotulelei is the cousin of defensive tackle Star Lotulelei, who was selected in the first round of the 2013 NFL draft, playing for the Carolina Panthers and Buffalo Bills.
