= Kristian Robinson =

Kristian Robinson may refer to:

- Capitol K, Maltese musician
- Kristian Robinson (baseball) (born 2000), Bahamian baseball player

== See also ==
- Christian Robinson (born 1986), American illustrator and animator
