= Andrew Dalquist =

American baseball player (born 2000)

Free agent
- Pitcher
- Born: November 13, 2000 (age 25); Redondo Beach, California, U.S.
- Bats: Right Throws: Right

Andrew R. Dalquist (born November 13, 2000) is an American professional baseball pitcher who is a free agent.

== Career ==
Dalquist was born and grew up in Redondo Beach, California, and attended Redondo Union High School. As a senior, he went 9–0 with a 1.78 ERA and 103 strikeouts. Dalquist had committed to play college baseball at the University of Arizona prior to being drafted.

=== Chicago White Sox ===
Dalquist was selected in the third round (81st overall) of the 2019 Major League Baseball draft by the Chicago White Sox. After signing with the team, he was assigned to the Arizona League White Sox where he made three one-inning appearances, all of which were scoreless.

Dalquist did not play in a game in 2020 due to the cancellation of the minor league season because of the COVID-19 pandemic. Dalquist was added to the White Sox's alternate training site midway through the Major League season.

Dalquist was assigned to the Low-A Kannapolis Cannon Ballers for the 2021 season. Over 23 starts, he went 3–9 with a 4.99 ERA and 79 strikeouts over 83 innings. Dalquist split the 2022 season between the High-A Winston-Salem Dash and Double-A Birmingham Barons. In 26 starts for the two affiliates, he logged a cumulative 3–11 record and 6.49 ERA with 80 strikeouts over 104 innings of work.

Dalquist returned to Winston-Salem for the 2023 season, but struggled to a 3–6 record and 7.69 ERA with 60 strikeouts across 22 appearances (15 starts). In 2024, Dalquist made 38 appearances out of the bullpen for Birmingham, registering a 2–3 record and 3.06 ERA with 52 strikeouts and one save over 47 innings of work.

Dalquist returned to Birmingham for the 2025 season, posting a 6–3 record and 3.20 ERA with 50 strikeouts and one save in 56 1/3 innings pitched across 43 relief appearances. He elected free agency following the season on November 6, 2025.

=== San Diego Padres ===
On December 17, 2025, Dalquist signed a minor league contract with the San Diego Padres. He made 15 appearances for the Double–A San Antonio Missions, logging a 1–2 record and 7.71 ERA with 28 strikeouts and one save over 21 innings of work. Dalquist was released by the Padres organization on August 4, 2026.
