= Joe Bertram (Hawaii politician) =

American politician (1957–2020)

Joe Bertram III

Member of the Hawaii House of Representatives from the 11th district
- In office January 2007 – January 2011
- Preceded by: Chris Halford (R)
- Succeeded by: George Fontaine (R)

Personal details
- Born: April 29, 1957 Boulder, Colorado
- Died: May 24, 2020 (aged 63)
- Party: Democratic
- Spouse: Albert Morairty

Joseph William Bertram III (April 29, 1957 – May 24, 2020) was an American politician from the Hawaiian island of Maui, who served as a member of the Hawaii House of Representatives. A Democrat, he represented the 11th district in south Maui, which includes the communities of Wailea-Makena and Kihei, his hometown. He was a candidate for reelection in 2010 but lost the general election to Republican nominee George R. Fontaine. He left office in January 2011.

Bertram moved to Hawaii at the age of nine and attended Kihei Elementary School, Seabury Hall in Makawao and Henry Perrine Baldwin High School in Wailuku.

Bertram served the Maui community in a number of roles, including founding Bikeways Maui in 1995 to foster bicycle transportation, serving on the Maui Green Party of Hawaii Executive Committee 1995–2000, the Mayor's Bicycle Advisory Committee 1995–2000, and the Maui County Planning Commission 1996–2001.

Bertram ran unsuccessfully for the Maui County Council three times before mounting a campaign for the state legislature in 2006. In the primary election held on September 23, Bertram defeated fellow Democrat Stephen West by 61% to 39%. In the general election held November 7, he overcame the Republican nominee by a margin of 60% to 40% − a majority of 1,046 votes. He succeeded a Republican, Rep. Chris Halford, who had retired. Running for a second term in 2008, Bertram faced a primary challenge from Michael Gingerich but defeated him comfortably, taking 70% of the vote. He faced a Republican in the general election, defeating him by 57% to 43%.

In 2010, he faced both primary and general election opponents. In the Democratic primary election held on September 18, he defeated two opponents, garnering 44 percent of the vote. The second-placed finisher gained 28%. In the general election held on November 2, he was narrowly defeated by Republican nominee George Fontaine. Fontaine won 51.5% to Bertram's 48.5% – a margin of 172 votes.

Bertram married his partner of 30 years Albert Morairty in December 2013.

Bertram died on May 24, 2020, at the age of 63.
