= Tyler Baum =

Free agent
- Pitcher
- Born: January 14, 1998 (age 28); Orlando, Florida, U.S.
- Bats: Right Throws: Right

Tyler Cole Baum (born January 14, 1998) is an American professional baseball pitcher who is a free agent.

== Amateur career ==
Baum attended West Orange High School in Winter Garden, Florida. Going into the 2016 playoffs, he held a 7–0 record and a 2.07 ERA with 70 strikeouts. The team advanced to the final four, but fell in the state qualifying game to Marjory Stoneman Douglas High School.

Baum went unselected in the 2016 Major League Baseball draft, and he enrolled at the University of North Carolina where he played college baseball. In 2017, Baum's freshman season, he started 15 games and pitched 63 innings in which he went 7–0 with a 2.57 ERA. That summer, he played collegiate summer baseball for the Harwich Mariners of the Cape Cod Baseball League, where he was named a league all-star and posted a 5–1 record on the mound. As a sophomore in 2018, he made 18 appearances (12 starts), going 4–1 with a 4.57 ERA. He returned to play for Harwich after the season. In 2019, he appeared in 17 games (making 16 starts), pitching to a 7–3 record and a 3.87 ERA.

== Professional career ==
Baum was selected by the Oakland Athletics in the second round (66th overall) of the 2019 Major League Baseball draft.

Baum signed with Oakland for $900,000 and made his professional debut with the Vermont Lake Monsters of the Low-A New York–Penn League. Over 11 starts, he went 0–3 with a 4.70 ERA, striking out 34 batters over 30 2/3 innings. Baum did not play in a game in 2020 due to the cancellation of the minor league season because of the COVID-19 pandemic, but was added to Oakland's 60-man player pool and spent the summer training at their alternate site.

Baum missed the beginning of the 2021 season and did not make his season debut until mid-August with the Rookie-level Arizona Complex League Athletics with whom he gave up 17 earned runs and twenty walks over 12 2/3 innings. He was assigned to the Stockton Ports of the Single-A California League to open the 2022 season, but was reassigned to the Arizona Complex League. He continued to struggle with control, going 1–1 with a 17.00 ERA, 47 walks, and 32 strikeouts over 27 innings between both teams. Baum split the 2023 season between the Lansing Lugnuts of the High-A Midwest League and the Midland RockHounds of the Double-A Texas League, appearing in 39 games and going 2-2 with a 3.54 ERA, 62 strikeouts, 25 walks, and 16 saves over 48 1/3 innings. Baum played the 2024 season with Midland and the Las Vegas Aviators of the Triple-A Pacific Coast League and went 3-6 with a 4.95 ERA and 72 strikeouts across 60 innings.

In 2025, Baum made 36 appearances split between the ACL Athletics, Midland, and Las Vegas, accumulating a 1-4 record and 5.50 ERA with 45 strikeouts and one save over 36 innings of work. He elected free agency following the season on November 6, 2025.

On November 26, 2025, Baum signed a minor league contract with the Washington Nationals. He did not make an appearance in 2026 due to injury. Baum elected free agency on November 2.
