= Abbey Park High School =

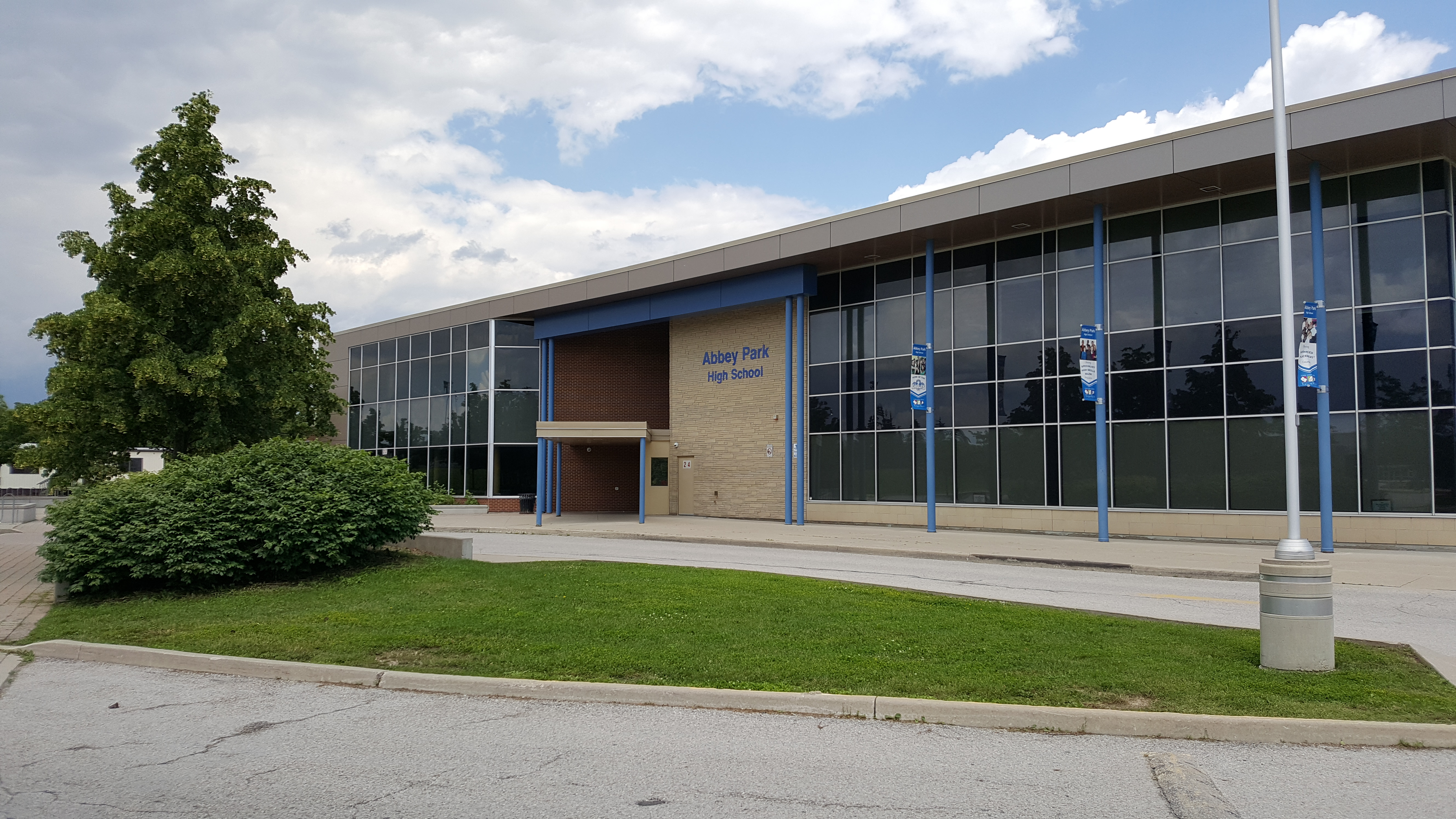

Location
- 1455 Glen Abbey Gate; Oakville, Ontario, L6M 2V7; Canada; 43°26′10″N 079°44′10″W

Information
- School type: Public, High school
- Founded: 2004
- School board: Halton District School Board
- Superintendent: Eleanor McIntosh
- Area trustee: Joanna Oliver
- School number: 913715
- Principal: Michael Gallant
- Grades: 9–12
- Enrolment: 1298 (2021-2022)
- Language: English
- Colours: blue & white
- Mascot: Joe Eagle
- Team name: Eagles
- Publication: Eagle Ink
- Feeder schools: Abbey Lane Public School, Heritage Glen Public School, Pilgrim Wood Public School
- Public transit access: Oakville Transit
- Website: aph.hdsb.ca

Abbey Park High School, commonly referred to as APHS, is a secondary school located in the town of Oakville, Ontario in the Greater Toronto Area. Abbey Park High School was opened at its present location in the wake of the closure of Queen Elizabeth Park High School, which was previously operating at its Bridge Road location, in Bronte. Abbey Park has more resources available to its students than other schools in the region because it inherited Queen Elizabeth Park's resources when it was closed. This allowed for the initial opening budget to be spent on new equipment. Students have open access to a fitness room, home economics kitchen, library, and track. Abbey Park High School is also situated beside the Glen Abbey Community Centre, which houses the Glen Abbey branch of the Oakville Public Library.

== Academics ==
Academically, Abbey Park is among the strongest secondary schools in Ontario ranking 10th overall and first in Oakville. Abbey Park offers a variety of enrichment programs such as the Cluster Program for high achieving students, two Specialist High Skills Major (SHSM) programs for business and the social sciences as well as an Ontario Youth Apprenticeship Program (OYAP) for fashion. Recently, Abbey Park began offering the Advanced Placement Calculus, Advanced Placement Biology and Advanced Placement Statistics courses. Abbey Park students continue to succeed in math competitions often earning regional, provincial and national recognition; Abbey Park ranked number two in Oakville, in its math contests performance in the year 2011–2012.

Abbey Park students have also been very successful in the Bay Area Science And Engineering Fair (BASEF) interregional competition. In 2010, a student from Abbey Park won second best in fair and progressed to Intel's International Science and Engineering Fair (ISEF). In 2012, two Abbey Park students progressed to ISEF, one of whom won the best in fair award. In 2013, one Abbey Park student progressed to ISEF and won second best in fair. In 2014, two Abbey Park students won gold merit awards and progressed to Canada Wide Science Fair (CWSF). In 2020, one Abbey Park student won a silver merit award and progressed to CWSF.

== Arts ==
=== Drama ===
The dramatic arts program at Abbey Park attracts many students to participate in its clubs and productions.

Every year, Abbey Park organizes a team to compete in the Canadian Improv Games, a national tournament for high school improv. Abbey Park's teams have been consistently strong over the years, and won the silver medal at the 2009 National Tournament, placing 15th nationally in 2008.

== Sports ==
=== Basketball ===
Boys and Girls Eagles Basketball teams compete in the Halton Secondary School Athletic Association (HSSAA). The Midget Boys basketball team won the Halton Region Championship in the school's first season in 2005.

== Councils ==
Abbey Park has several student-body councils for different areas of interest. The Arts Council plans art-related events, the Student Government plans events such as Coffee House and Pasta Night, the Environmental Council is committed to improving the quality of the environment in and around the school and the Social Council tackles and raises awareness of worldwide social problems. Abbey Park's Executive Council is a meta-council consisting of leaders from all councils & clubs. The Executive Council meets semi-annually.

The Ontario Organization of Secondary Students (OOSS) began at Abbey Park. In 2016, OOSS was renamed (FCSS-FESC), the Federation of Canadian Secondary Students (French: Fédération des élèves du secondaire au Canada). It is currently active across Canada.

== Clubs ==
=== DECA ===
The business department at Abbey Park runs a DECA chapter for the school. Abbey Park competes at DECA Ontario's Hamilton Regional Competition in November, and a large percentage of competitors move on to the provincial competition in February in Toronto.

=== Diplomats Society ===
Abbey Park's Diplomats Society is a club to debate politics and recent events.

== Notable alumni ==
- Steve Mason, NHL rookie of the month in 2008–09
- Alice Moran, actress, Sunnyside, Canadian Screen Award-winner
- Stuart Percy, National Hockey League Toronto Maple Leafs first round draft pick 2011 (25th overall)

== See also ==
- Education in Ontario
- List of secondary schools in Ontario
