= Okanagan College =

College in British Columbia, Canada

- Former names: B.C. Vocational Institute, Okanagan University College
- Type: Public
- Established: 1963
- Affiliations: CCAA, CCBC, CBIE
- Academic affiliations: CICan
- Endowment: $68,294,167
- Chairperson: Dale Safinuk
- President: Neil Fassina
- Provost: Samantha Lenci
- Students: 5,218 FTE (2024-25 FTE)
- Location: Kelowna, British Columbia, Vernon, British Columbia, Penticton, British Columbia, and Salmon Arm, British Columbia
- Campus: Suburban, Multicampus
- Sports teams: Coyotes
- Colours: White ; black ; red
- Nickname: Coyotes
- Website: www.okanagancollege.ca
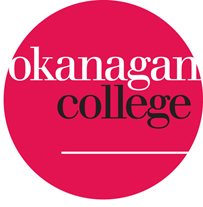

Okanagan College is a public post-secondary institution with multiple campuses spread across the southern interior of British Columbia, Canada. The College was established in 1963 and has grown to become one of the largest colleges in British Columbia outside the Lower Mainland and Victoria. It has roughly 5,000 full-time students per semester across four regional campuses. 1,885 international students from over 40 countries studied at Okanagan College in 2022-23, comprising 11% of its total student headcount. The College once had one of the fastest growing populations of Indigenous students of any college in the province; in the 2015-16 academic year Okanagan College delivered educational programming to 1,680 Indigenous students (more than three times the number that attended in 2005-06). However, the growth did not continue, in 2021-22 the Indigenous student headcount remained at 1,690.

== History ==
Okanagan College was the first college in British Columbia and first opened in 1906 in Summerland, BC.

With roots dating back to 1963, Okanagan College has always played an important role in the development of the region. The name was changed to Okanagan University College (OUC) c. 1995, but the older name Okanagan College was re-adopted on July 1, 2005, as OUC was divided into Okanagan College and UBC Okanagan.

== Campuses ==
In 2006 Okanagan College operated four main campuses, Kelowna, Penticton, Vernon, and Salmon Arm as well as many smaller access centres.

== Programs ==
The College offers a wide array of programs in university arts and science, business, trades, health, technologies, adult basic education (upgrading), adult special education and continuing studies.

Programs that may be of interest to international students include: ESL courses/language training, vocational and trades programs and four-year degrees in both Business and Computer Information Systems. Many students also choose the university transfer program which allows students a smooth transition and cost-saving entry method into many of Canada’s most prestigious universities. This program includes courses in history, literature, psychology, chemistry, biology, physics and gender studies. The College also has a long history of successful study tours, student exchanges and customized group training programs.

The College is also home to a number of programs that are unique to the institution, including the Sustainable Construction Management Technology (SCMT) program based out of The Jim Pattison Centre of Excellence at the Penticton campus. The program provides students with practical, hands-on education in current and emerging green building techniques and technologies.

== Vice Society Hack ==
On January 9, 2023, Okanagan College warned students and staff that an unrecognized external agent had breached the security of their technology systems. The hacker group Vice Society took credit for the attack, claiming to have extracted over 850 gigabytes of data.

== Notable alumni ==
People who attended Okanagan College include:

- Jeannette Armstrong
- Trevor Brigden
- Maureen Gruben
- Ryan Holmes
- Randall Hansen

== See also ==
- List of institutes and colleges in British Columbia
- List of universities in British Columbia
- Higher education in British Columbia
- Education in Canada
