= Los Angeles Dodgers minor league players =

Below is a partial list of Minor League Baseball players in the Los Angeles Dodgers system.

== Players ==
=== Maddux Bruns ===
Maddux Bruns
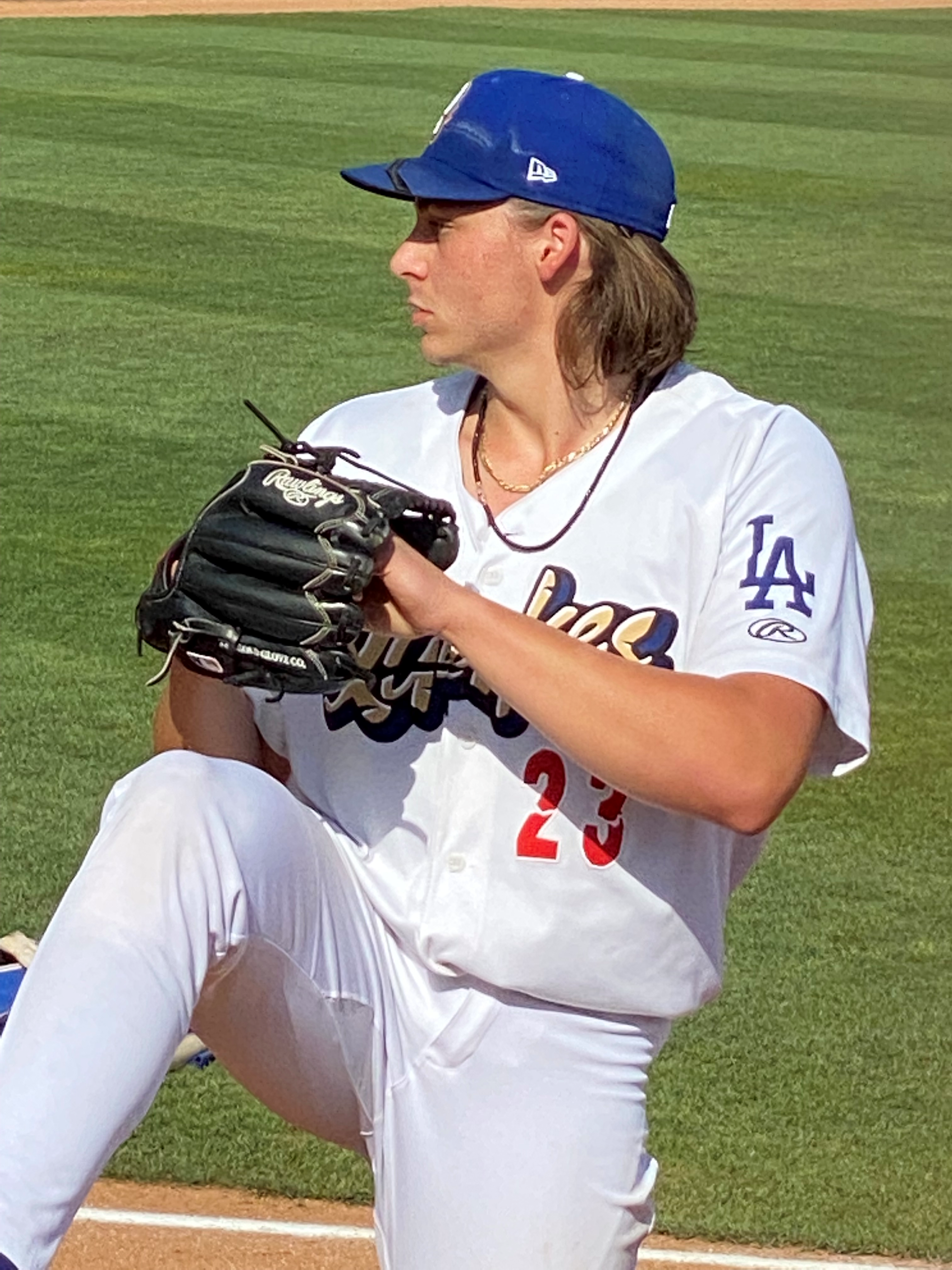
- Bruns with the Rancho Cucamonga Quakes

Los Angeles Dodgers
- Pitcher
- Born: June 20, 2002 (age 24); Mobile, Alabama, U.S.
- Bats: Left Throws: Left

Maddux John Bruns (born June 20, 2002) is an American professional baseball pitcher in the Los Angeles Dodgers organization.

Bruns grew up in Saraland, Alabama, and attended UMS-Wright Preparatory School. He was named Alabama's Gatorade Baseball Player of the Year and Mr. Baseball as a senior after going 7–0 with a 0.86 ERA and 102 strikeouts and just 13 hits and six earned runs allowed in 49 innings pitched. He committed to play college baseball at Mississippi State.

Bruns was selected 29th overall in the 2021 Major League Baseball draft by the Los Angeles Dodgers. He signed with the Dodgers for a $2.2 million signing bonus. In his first professional season, he started four games for the Arizona Complex League Dodgers, allowing nine runs on eight hits and seven walks while striking out five in five innings of work. He made 21 starts for the Rancho Cucamonga Quakes of the Class-A California League in 2022, with an 0–2 record and 5.68 ERA. After starting 2023 with Rancho Cucamonga, Bruns was promoted to the Great Lakes Loons of the High–A Midwest League on May 11. Between the two levels, he made 26 starts, with a 0–7 record, a 3.99 ERA and 126 strikeouts in 97 innings. Bruns made 10 starts for the Loons in 2024, with a 3.18 ERA while missing half the season with an elbow injury. After returning from his injury, he made 13 starts in 2025 for the Loons, with a 2–3 record and 5.47 ERA.

Bruns was promoted to the Double-A Tulsa Drillers to begin the 2026 season. Moved to the bullpen, Bruns struggled with Tulsa, allowing 26 runs in 15 2/3 innings over 15 games for a 14.94 ERA. He was placed on the development list on June 9 and didn't pitch again until August 21 when he was returned to the Loons. He pitched 6 2/3 scoreless innings over five games to finish out the season.

- Career statistics from Baseball Reference (Minors)

=== Patrick Copen ===
Patrick Copen
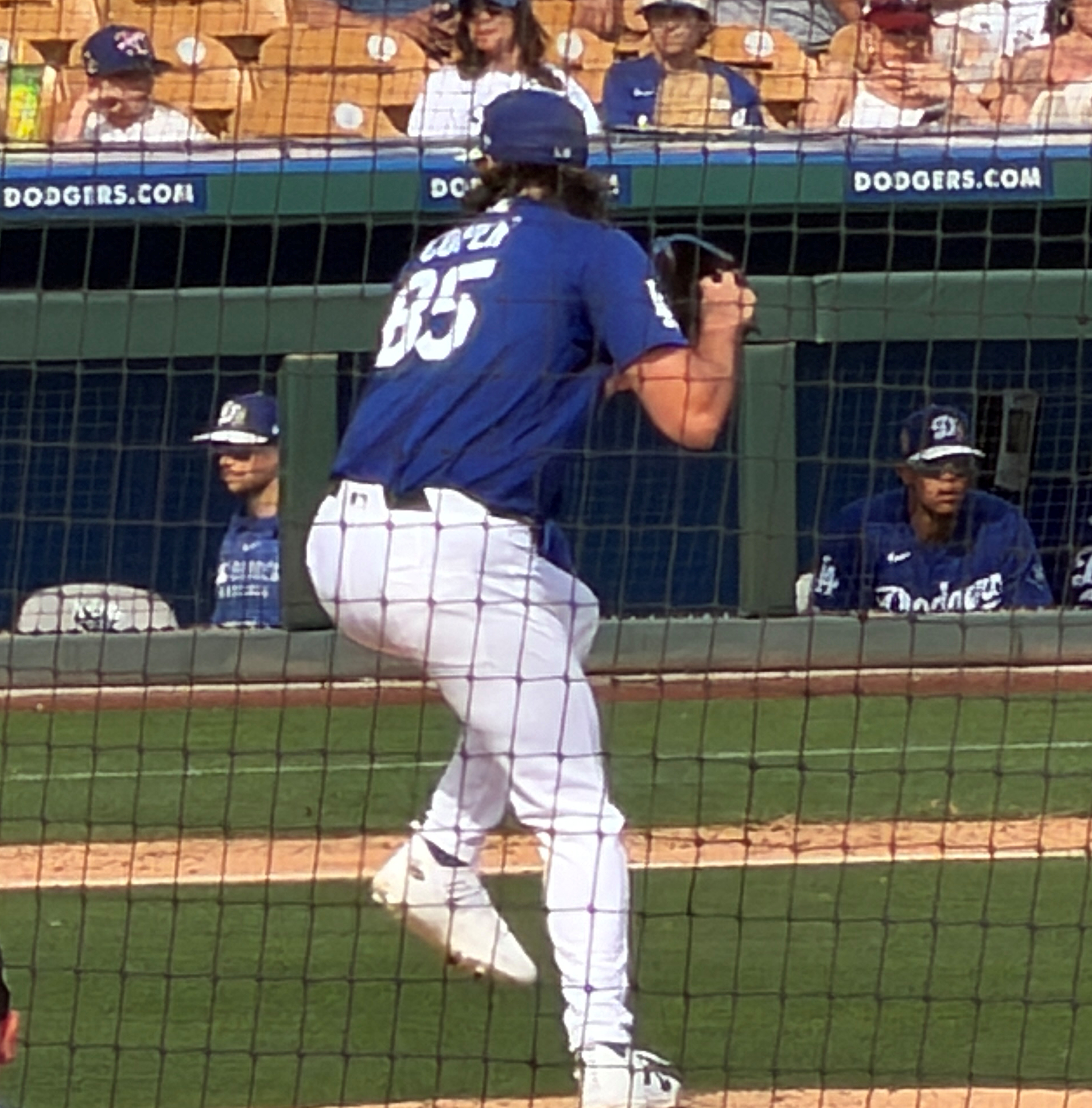
- Patrick Copen pitching in a 2026 spring training game

Los Angeles Dodgers
- Pitcher
- Born: February 15, 2002 (age 24); Parkersburg, West Virginia, U.S.
- Bats: Right Throws: Right

Patrick Wayne Copen (born February 15, 2002) is an American professional baseball pitcher in the Los Angeles Dodgers organization.

Copen attended Parkersburg Catholic High School in Parkersburg, West Virginia and played college baseball at Marshall University. In 2022, he played collegiate summer baseball with the Brewster Whitecaps of the Cape Cod Baseball League. He was selected by the Los Angeles Dodgers in the seventh round of the 2023 Major League Baseball draft.

Copen signed with the Dodgers and spent his first professional season with the Arizona Complex League Dodgers and Rancho Cucamonga Quakes. He started 2024 with Rancho Cucamonga and was promoted to the Great Lakes Loons. In August, Copen was hit in the face by a line drive causing him to lose vision in his right eye and ending his season. Despite not having regained vision in his eye, he opened the 2025 season with Great Lakes. He made 10 starts with the Loons and another 17 for the Double-A Tulsa Drillers, with a combined 4–7 record and 3.59 ERA.

Copen remained with Tulsa for the 2026 season, where he finished 9–7 with a 5.90 ERA in 26 games (23 starts) and 136 strikeouts.

- Career statistics from Baseball Reference (Minors)

=== Charles Davalan ===
Charles Davalan
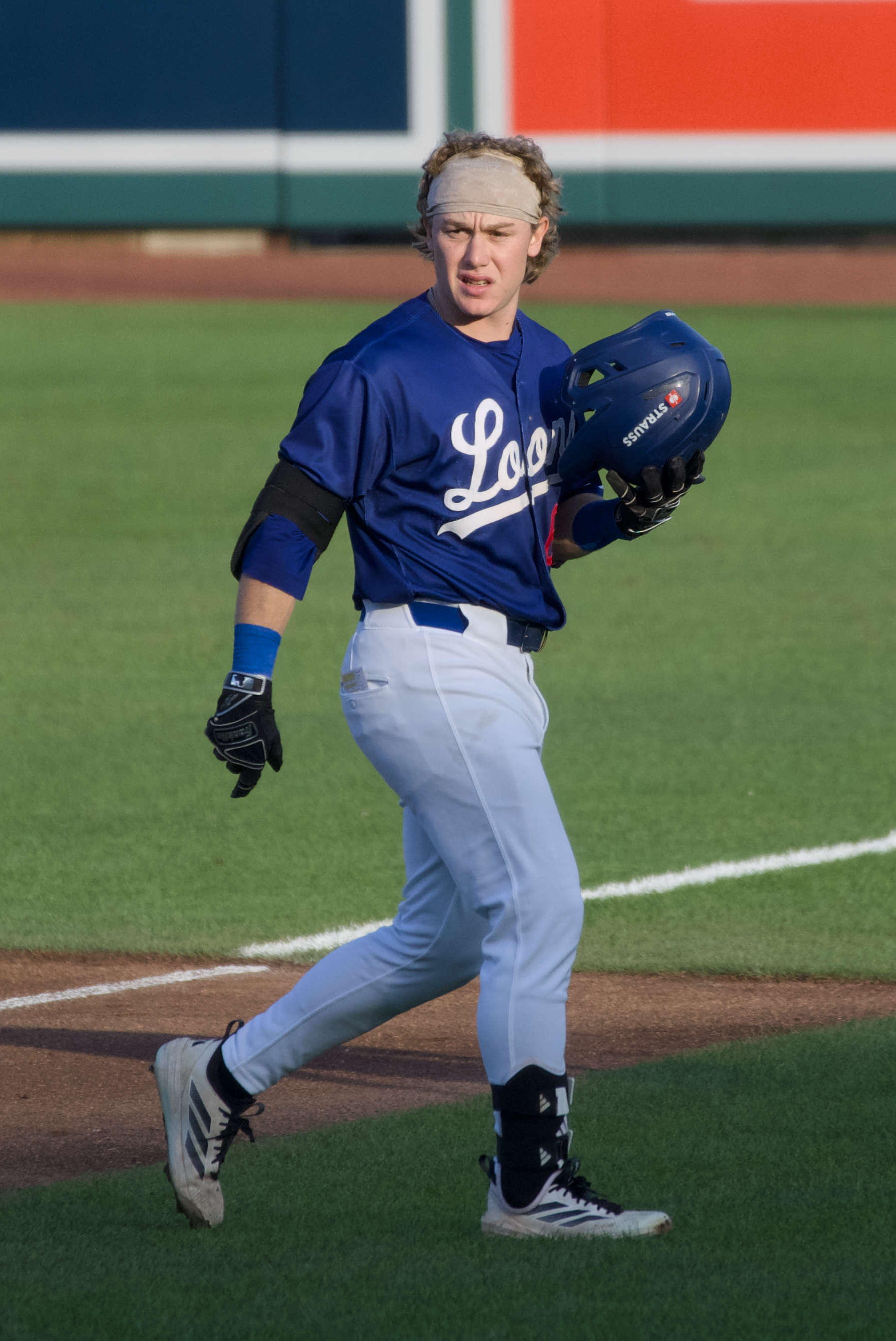
- Davalan with the Great Lakes Loons in 2026

Los Angeles Dodgers
- Outfielder
- Born: December 16, 2003 (age 22); Waterloo, Ontario, Canada
- Bats: Left Throws: Right

Charles Malcolm Davalan is a Canadian professional baseball outfielder in the Los Angeles Dodgers organization.

Davalan attended TNXL Academy in Altamonte Springs, Florida. He then attended Florida Gulf Coast University before transferring to the University of Arkansas. In 2024, he played collegiate summer baseball with the Cotuit Kettleers of the Cape Cod Baseball League. He was selected by the Los Angeles Dodgers in the first round of the 2025 MLB draft. He signed with the Dodgers for a $2 million signing bonus. He made his professional debut late in the season with the Rancho Cucamonga Quakes, playing in eight games with 17 hits in 34 at-bats (a .500 average). Davalan was promoted to the Great Lakes Loons of the Midwest League for 2026. In 115 games, he batted .292 with 24 home runs and 72 RBI for the Loons and was rewarded by being selected as the leagues most valuable player. He was promoted to the Double-A Tulsa Drillers on the final day of the regular season.

- Career statistics from Baseball Reference (Minors)
- Florida Gulf Coast Eagles bio
- Arkansas Razorbacks bio

=== Zach Ehrhard ===
Zach Ehrhard

Los Angeles Dodgers
- Outfielder
- Born: January 21, 2003 (age 23); Tampa, Florida, U.S.
- Bats: Right Throws: Right

Zachary Tanner Ehrhard (born January 21, 2003) is an American professional baseball outfielder in the Los Angeles Dodgers organization.

Ehrhard attended Paul R. Wharton High School in Tampa, Florida. He was selected by the Boston Red Sox in the 13th round of the 2021 Major League Baseball draft, but did not sign and played college baseball at Oklahoma State University. In 2023, he played collegiate summer baseball with the Hyannis Harbor Hawks of the Cape Cod Baseball League. After three years at Oklahoma State, he was again selected by the Red Sox, this time in the fourth round of the 2024 MLB draft.

Ehrhard made his professional debut with the Greenville Drive in 2024, hitting .156 in 22 games. He was promoted to the Portland Sea Dogs in 2025, hitting .227 in 58 games. On July 31, 2025 the Red Sox traded Ehrhard and James Tibbs III to the Los Angeles Dodgers for Dustin May.

Ehrhard started his Dodgers career with the Tulsa Drillers, hitting .282 in 34 games, and began the 2026 season with the Oklahoma City Comets. He played in 138 games, batting .291 with 20 home runs and 93 RBI. His 120 runs scored led the Pacific Coast League and was the most for a single season in Dodgers' minor league history since Lemmie Miller of the Albuquerque Dukes scored 122 in 1983.

- Career statistics from Baseball Reference (Minors)

=== Mason Estrada ===
Mason Estrada
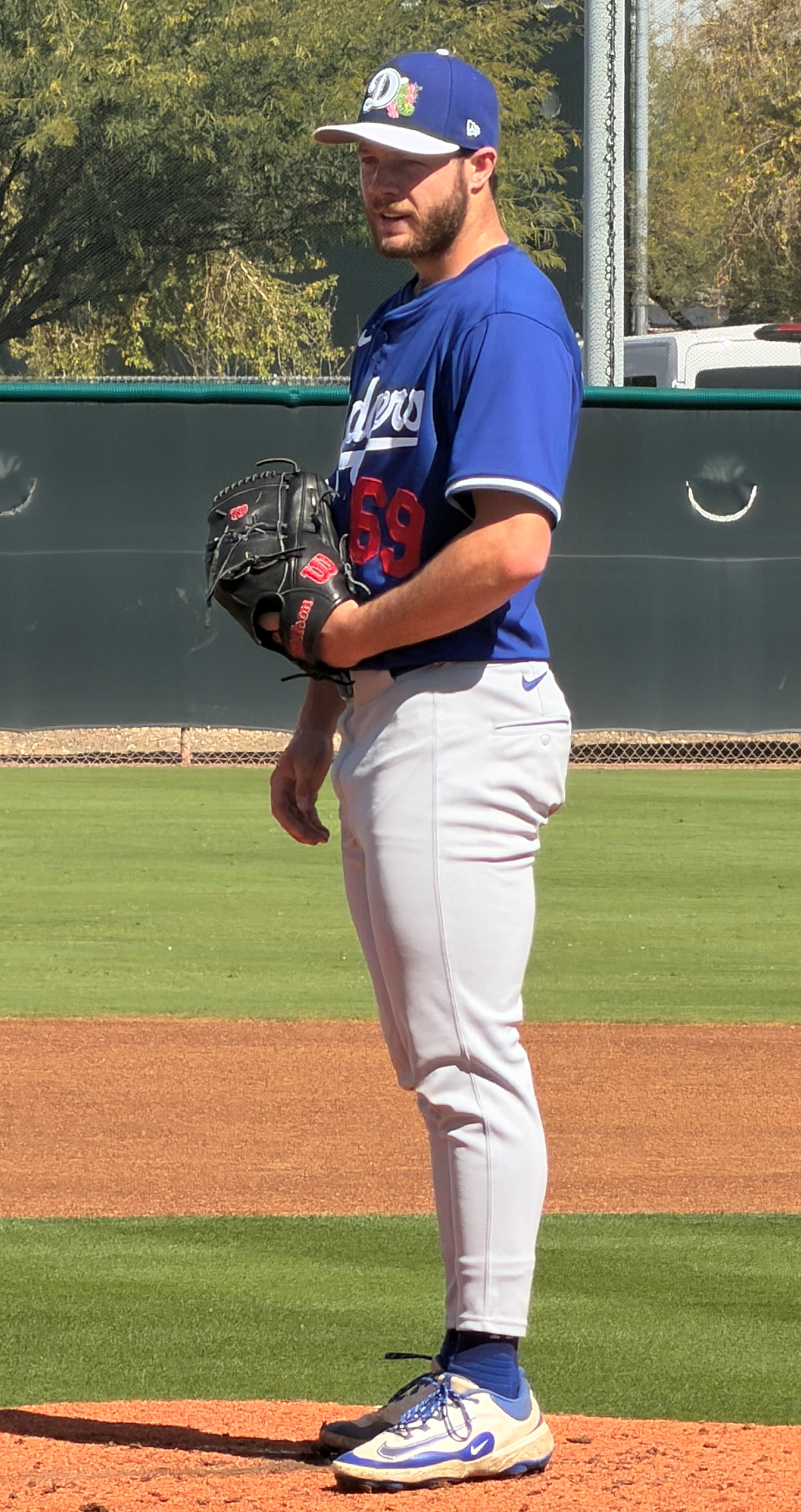
- Estrada at 2026 Spring Training

Los Angeles Dodgers
- Pitcher
- Born: May 12, 2004 (age 22); Covington, Louisiana, U.S.
- Bats: Left Throws: Right

Mason Estrada (born May 12, 2004) is an American professional baseball pitcher for the Los Angeles Dodgers organization. He played college baseball for the MIT Engineers.

Estrada attended Covington High School in Covington, Louisiana. With MIT in his sophomore season, Estrada finished with NEWMAC First Team All-Conference, ABCA/Rawlings All-Region Team: Region 1 First Team, and D3baseball.com All-Region Region 1 First Team after going 6-0 with 66 strikeouts and a 2.21 ERA over 40.2 innings pitched.

Estrada had initially transferred to the Tennessee Volunteers while also being a rising prospect for the 2025 MLB draft. MLB mentions Estrada getting a 36 superscore on the ACT, while catching the attention of scouts when showing a consistent fastball at 94-96 mph while on a big league mound with all eyes on him. Also Estrada was throwing mid 80s sliders/cutters that registered as high as 2700 RPMs.

Estrada was drafted in the 7th round, 225th pick in the 2025 MLB draft by the Los Angeles Dodgers, becoming the fifth MIT baseball student-athlete to be selected in the MLB Draft. The Dodgers assigned him to the Single-A Ontario Tower Buzzers in 2026 to begin his professional career. He pitched in 23 games (15 starts) with a 2–6 record, 8.68 ERA and 92 strikeouts.

- MIT Engineers bio
- Career statistics from Baseball Reference (Minors)

=== Luke Fox ===
Luke Fox

Los Angeles Dodgers
- Pitcher
- Born: January 4, 2002 (age 24); Milwaukee, Wisconsin, U.S.
- Bats: Left Throws: Left

Luke Saber Fox (born January 4, 2002) is an American professional baseball pitcher in the Los Angeles Dodgers organization.

Fox played college baseball at Duke University. He was selected by the Los Angeles Dodgers in the 17th round of the 2023 MLB draft. On November 17, 2026, the Dodgers purchased his contract and added him to the 40-man roster.

- Career statistics from Baseball Reference (Minors)

=== Kendall George ===
Kendall George
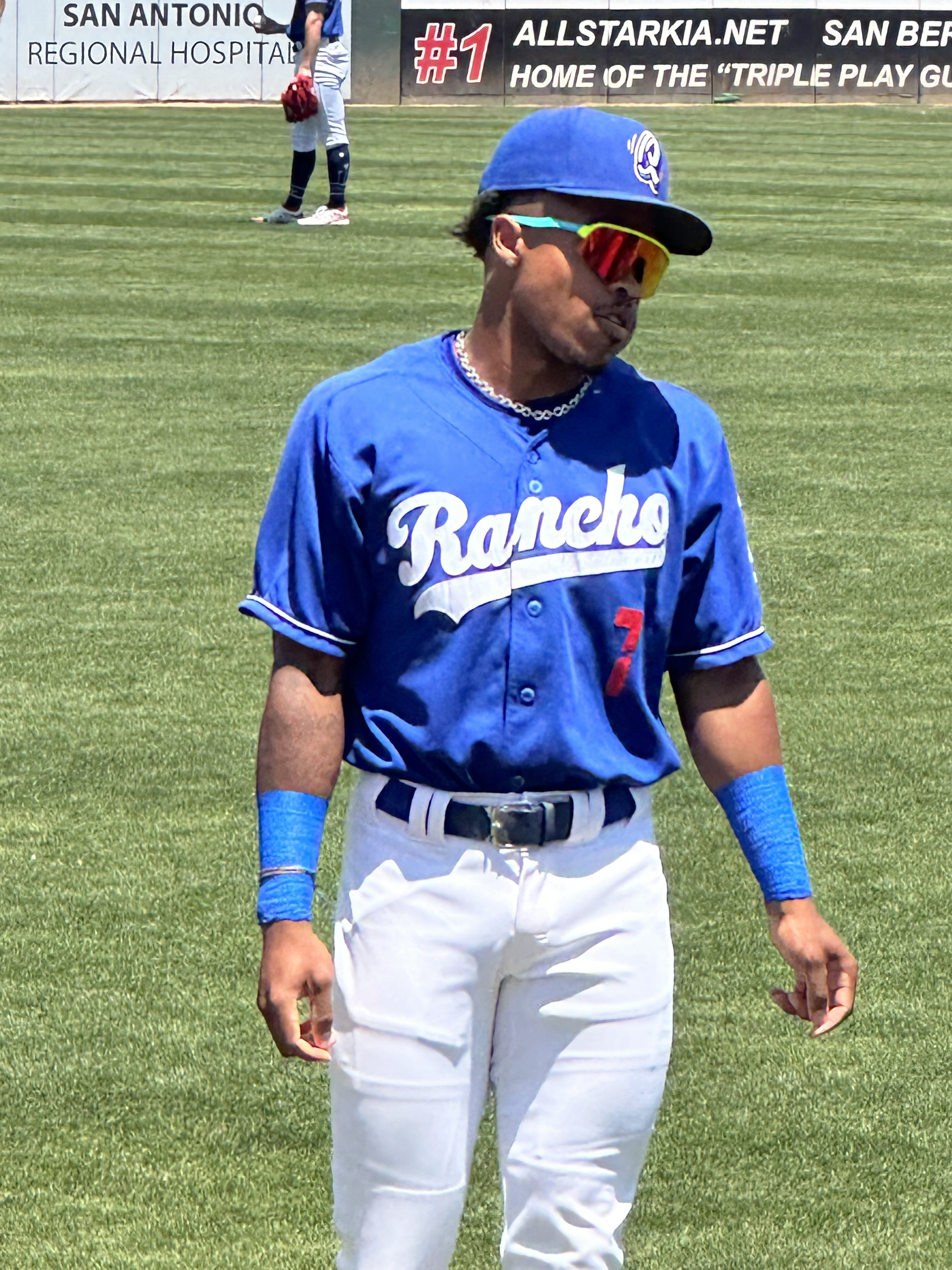
- George with the Rancho Cucamonga Quakes

Los Angeles Dodgers
- Outfielder
- Born: October 29, 2004 (age 22); Humble, Texas, U.S.
- Bats: Left Throws: Left

Kendall Adli George (born October 29, 2004) is an American professional baseball outfielder in the Los Angeles Dodgers organization. George was selected by the Dodgers in the first round, with the 36th overall selection, of the 2023 Major League Baseball draft out of Atascocita High School in Humble, Texas. On July 21, 2023, George signed with the Dodgers for a below slot signing bonus of $1.85 million. He debuted for the Arizona Complex League Dodgers, playing in 12 games before being promoted to the Class-A Rancho Cucamonga Quakes for the last 16 games of the season. He hit .370 between the two levels with 17 stolen bases. George was selected to participate in the inaugural "Spring Breakout" minor league showcase during spring training 2024. Back with the Quakes in 2024, he played in 86 games and batted .279 while stealing 36 bases.

George was promoted to the High-A Great Lakes Loons to start the 2025 season where he batted .295 in 111 games while stealing 101 bases, the fifth highest single-season total by a minor leaguer since 2005. He earned post-season Midwest League All-Star honors. George was promoted to the Double-A Tulsa Drillers for 2026. He played in 55 games, with a .332 batting average and 33 stolen bases. However, George suffered a patellar injury while avoiding a bat collecting dog during a game, which required season ending surgery.

- Career statistics from Baseball Reference (Minors)

=== Chase Harlan ===
Chase Harlan
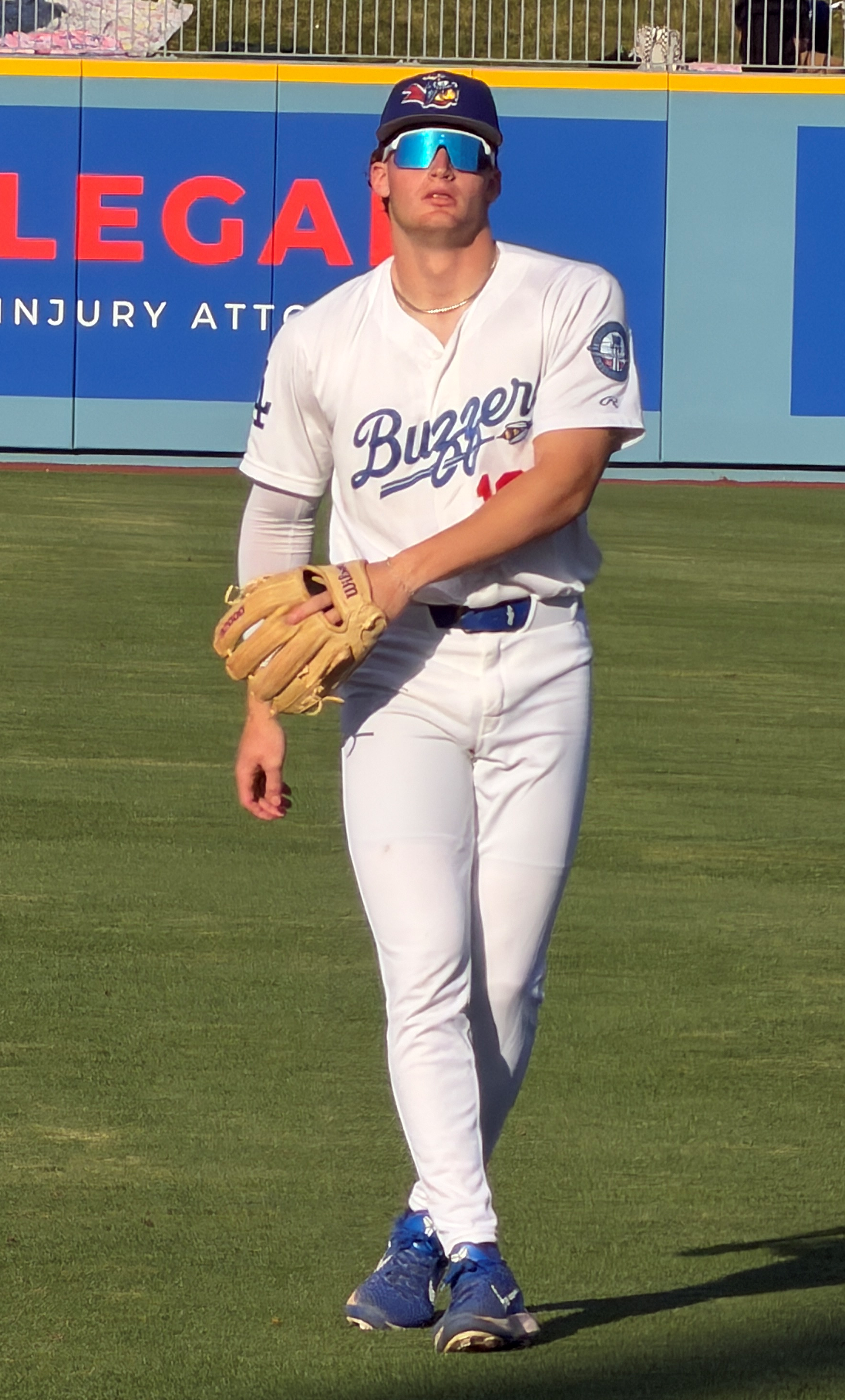
- Harlan with the Ontario Tower Buzzers

Los Angeles Dodgers
- Third baseman
- Born: July 19, 2006 (age 20); Allentown, Pennsylvania, U.S.
- Bats: Right Throws: Right

Chase Marshall Harlan (born July 9, 2006) is an American professional baseball third baseman in the Los Angeles Dodgers organization.

Harlan attended Central Bucks High School East in Buckingham, Pennsylvania. He was selected by the Los Angeles Dodgers in the third round of the 2024 Major League Baseball draft. He had been committed to play college baseball at Clemson University, but signed with the Dodgers.

Harlan made his professional debut in 2025 with the Arizona Complex League Dodgers and was promoted to the Rancho Cucamonga Quakes during the season. Between the two levels, he played in 68 games with a .269 batting average, nine home runs and 58 RBI. He began 2026 with the Ontario Tower Buzzers before being promoted to the Great Lakes Loons in June. Between the two levels, he batted .298 with 12 home runs and 66 RBI.

- Career statistics from Baseball Reference (Minors)

=== Hyun-seok Jang ===
Hyun-seok Jang
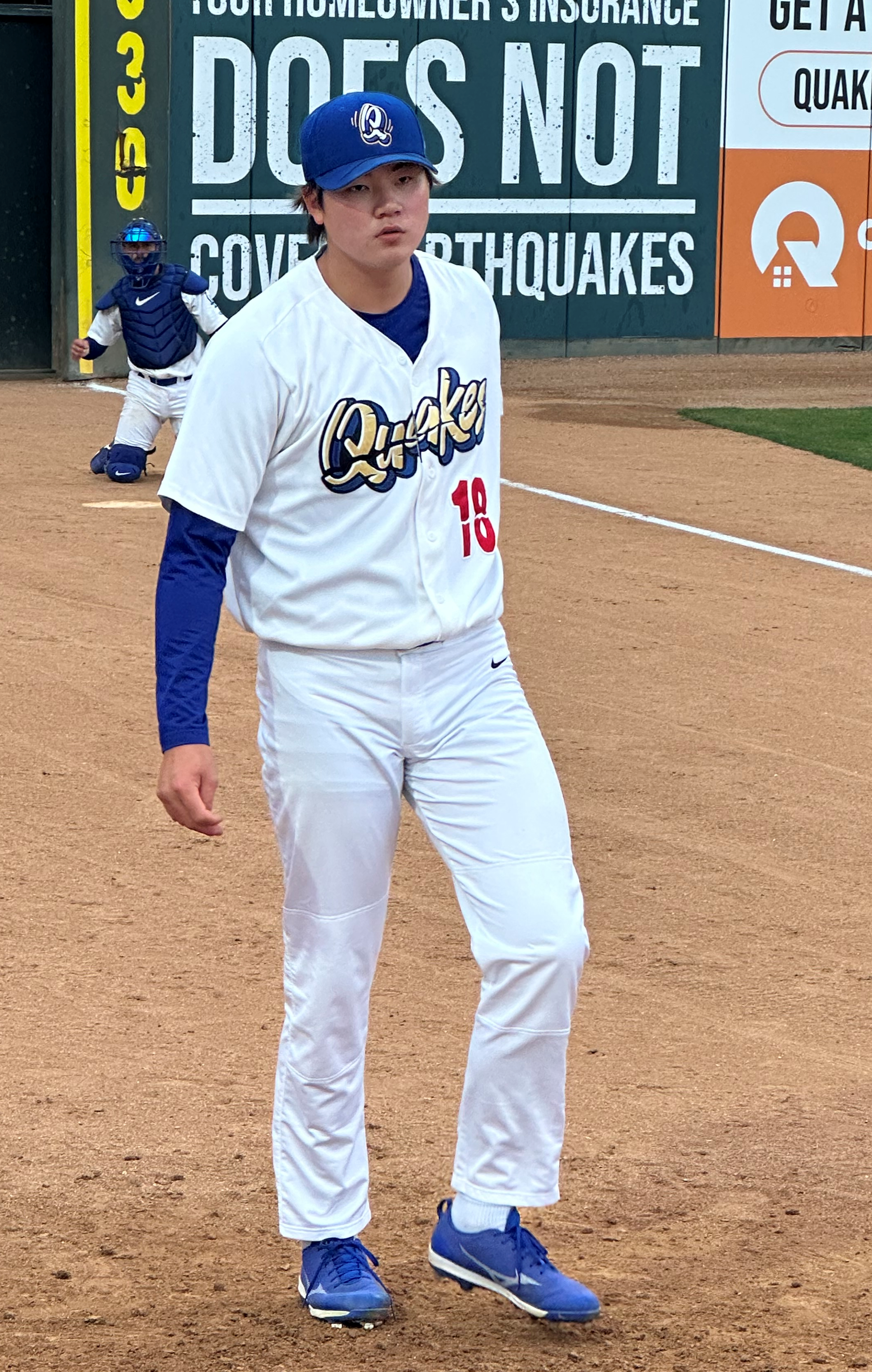
- Jang with the Rancho Cucamonga Quakes

Los Angeles Dodgers
- Pitcher
- Born: March 4, 2004 (age 22); Changwon, South Korea
- Bats: Right Throws: Right
Medals
Men's baseball
Representing South Korea
Asian Games
Gold medal – first place	2022 Hangzhou	Team

Hyun-Seok Jang (born March 4, 2004) is a South Korean professional baseball pitcher in the Los Angeles Dodgers organization.

Jang signed with the Dodgers as an international free agent on August 8, 2023, for a $900,000 signing bonus. In his final year at Masan Yongma High School, he struck out 49 in 27 1/3 innings with a 0.33 ERA. He was expected to be one of the top picks in the KBO League draft, but chose instead to play in America. He was also named to the South Korea national baseball team for the Asian Games.

Jang made his professional debut in 2024 with the Arizona Complex League Dodgers, pitching in 13 games with an 8.14 ERA and helping them win the league championship by striking out eight of the 11 batters he faced in the first game of the championship series. He was promoted to the Class-A Rancho Cucamonga Quakes of the California League for the rest of the minor league season, where he made five starts and allowed only three runs in 12 1/3 innings. Jang returned to Rancho Cucamonga for 2025, where he was the opening day starter. He made 13 starts with a 0–2 record, 4.65 ERA and 54 strikeouts. In 2026, Jang began with the new California Legaue affiliate, the Ontario Tower Buzzers before a late season promotion to the Great Lakes Loons. He had a 5–3 record, 5.42 ERA and 108 strikeouts in 20 games (18 starts) between the two levels.

- Career statistics from Baseball Reference (Minors)
- milb.com

=== Jared Karros ===
Jared Karros

Los Angeles Dodgers
- Pitcher
- Born: November 16, 2000 (age 26); Manhattan Beach, California, U.S.
- Bats: Right Throws: Right

Jared Cayden Karros (born November 16, 2000) is an American professional baseball pitcher in the Los Angeles Dodgers organization.

Karros attended Mira Costa High School in Manhattan Beach and was named the Bay League Pitcher of the Year as a senior, while posting a 7–3 record and 0.86 ERA. He went to college at University of California, Los Angeles (UCLA) and played for the Bruins baseball team. He was the team's opening day starter as a Sophomore in 2021 but only pitched in seven games because of a back injury, which also kept him from playing as a junior the following year. Despite the injuries, Karros was drafted by the Los Angeles Dodgers in the 16th round of the 2022 Major League Baseball (MLB) draft.

Karros made his professional debut in the 2023 season for the Rancho Cucamonga Quakes of the Class–A California League, appearing in 19 games (16 starts) with a 3–4 record and 4.97 ERA. He was promoted to the High–A Great Lakes Loons of the Midwest League at the end of the season and allowed only one run in 13 innings across three games. He returned to Great Lakes to begin the 2024 season and had a 5–0 record and 1.59 ERA in seven starts before a May 17 promotion to the Double–A Tulsa Drillers. He struck out nine in five innings in a June 9 start for the Drillers against the Amarillo Sod Poodles. He made eight starts for the Drillers, with a 2–1 record and 4.01, despite being inactive for almost three months.

Karros returned to Tulsa for the 2025 season, where he had a 1–5 record and 6.54 ERA in 12 starts before being sidelined with Tommy John surgery.

Karros is the son of former major league player Eric Karros. His brother, Kyle, was his teammate at UCLA and plays for the Colorado Rockies.

- Career statistics from Baseball Reference (Minors)

=== Jacob Kmatz ===
Jacob Kmatz

Los Angeles Dodgers
- Pitcher
- Born: September 28, 2002 (age 24); Albuquerque, New Mexico, U.S.
- Bats: Right Throws: Right

Jacob Alexander Kmatz (born September 28, 2002) is an American professional baseball pitcher in the Los Angeles Dodgers organization.

Kmatz attended Sandia High School in Albuquerque, New Mexico and played college baseball at Oregon State University. He was selected by the Tampa Bay Rays in the fifth round of the 2024 Major League Baseball draft.

Kmatz made his professional debut in 2025 with the Charleston RiverDogs, appearing in 23 games (with 19 starts) and recording a 4–9 record and 5.56 ERA.< In 2026 the Rays converted him into a bullpen pitcher. He started the season with the Bowling Green Hot Rods before being promoted to the Montgomery Biscuits.

On August 3, 2026 the Rays traded Kmatz and Hunter Feduccia to the Los Angeles Dodgers in exchange for Jack Suwinski and international bonus pool money. He started his Dodgers career with the Tulsa Drillers. With the Drillers, he pitched 18 2/3 innings with a 2.41 ERA.

- Career statistics from Baseball Reference (Minors)

=== Ronan Kopp ===
Ronan Kopp

Los Angeles Dodgers – No. 83
- Pitcher
- Born: July 15, 2002 (age 24); Baldwin Park, California, U.S.
- Bats: Left Throws: Left

Ronan Noah Kopp (born July 28, 2002) is an American professional baseball pitcher for the Los Angeles Dodgers of Major League Baseball (MLB).

Kopp attended Scottsdale Christian Academy in Phoenix, Arizona, and played college baseball at South Mountain Community College. He was drafted by the Los Angeles Dodgers in the 12th round of the 2021 MLB draft.

Kopp made his professional debut with the Arizona Complex League Dodgers in 2021 and pitched 2022 with Rancho Cucamonga Quakes and Great Lakes Loons. He spent 2023 with Great Lakes, pitching in 30 games (21 starts), where he was 0–4 with a 2.99 ERA and 107 strikeouts. He was selected to play for the Glendale Desert Dogs in the Arizona Fall League after the season and made the Fall Stars game. Kopp was selected to participate in the inaugural "Spring Breakout" minor league showcase during spring training 2024. He spent the 2024 season with the Double–A Tulsa Drillers, pitching 49 2/3 innings over 35 games, all as a relief pitcher, with a 4.17 ERA and 70 strikeouts. He returned to Tulsa for the start of the 2025 season, before a mid-season promotion to the Triple-A Oklahoma City Comets. Between the two levels, he was 2–4 with a 3.43 ERA in 49 games, while striking out 91.

On November 18, 2025, the Dodgers added Kopp to their 40-man roster to protect him from the Rule 5 draft and optioned him to Oklahoma City to begin the 2026 season. In 47 games for the Comets, he was 5–3 with a 6.80 ERA and 51 strikeouts.

- Career statistics from Baseball Reference (Minors)

=== Cam Leiter ===
Cam Leiter

Los Angeles Dodgers
- Pitcher
- Born: January 28, 2004 (age 22); Tampa, Florida, U.S.
- Bats: Right Throws: Right

Cameron Shane Leiter (born January 28, 2004) is an American professional baseball pitcher in the Los Angeles Dodgers organization.

Leiter attended Central Regional High School in Berkeley Township, New Jersey. As a senior in 2022, he had a 0.89 earned run average (ERA) with 90 strikeouts. After graduating, he enrolled at the University of Central Florida (UFC) to play college baseball for the Knights. As a freshman in 2023, he started 14 games and had a 3-2 win-loss record, a 4.92 ERA, and 80 strikeouts across 56 2/3 innings. In 2023, he played collegiate summer baseball with the Orleans Firebirds of the Cape Cod Baseball League.

After his freshman season at UCF, Leiter entered the transfer portal and ultimately committed to play at Florida State University for the Seminoles. Leiter made seven starts for the Seminoles in 2024 and had a 4.63 ERA with 56 strikeouts over 35 innings before missing the last three months of the season with an undisclosed injury. Leiter did not make an appearance for the Seminoles during the 2025 season, but was still selected by the Los Angeles Dodgers in the second round with the 65th overall pick of the 2025 Major League Baseball draft. He signed with the team for $1.35 million.

Leiter made his professional debut in 2026 with the Single-A Ontario Tower Buzzers. In August, he was promoted to the High-A Great Lakes Loons. Overall, he pitched 55 innings across 21 starts with a 1–0 record, 2.45 ERA and 80 strikeouts.

Leiter's father, Kurt, played professionally in the Baltimore Orioles organization. His uncles, Al Leiter and Mark Leiter, played in MLB and his cousins, Mark Leiter Jr. and Jack Leiter, currently pitch in MLB.

- Florida State Seminoles bio
- Career statistics from Baseball Reference (Minors)

=== Kellon Lindsey ===
Kellon Lindsey
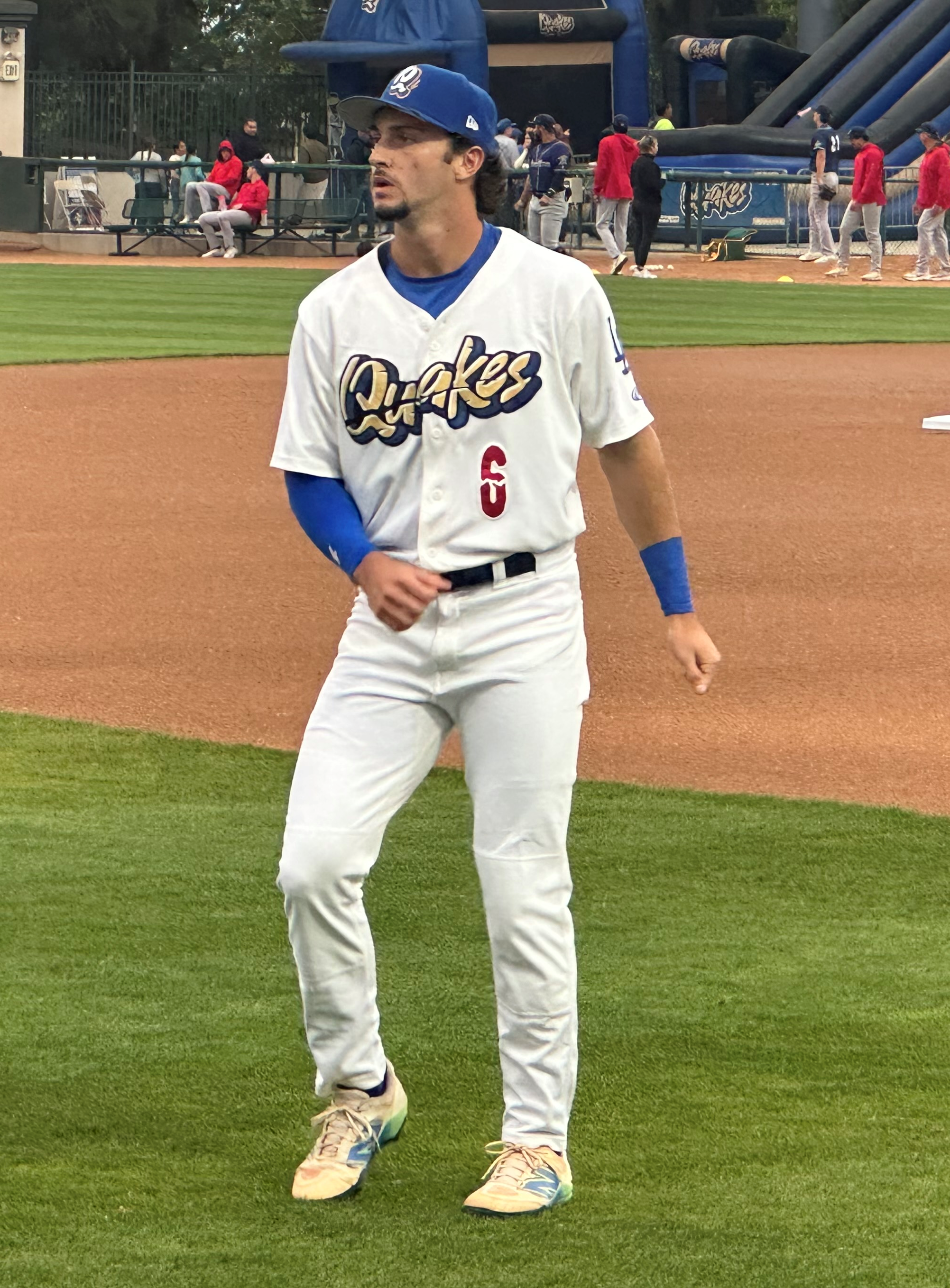
- Lindsey with the Rancho Cucamonga Quakes

Los Angeles Dodgers
- Shortstop
- Born: September 21, 2005 (age 21); Sebring, Florida, U.S.
- Bats: Right Throws: Right

Kellon Wade Lindsey (born September 21, 2005) is an American baseball shortstop in the Los Angeles Dodgers organization. He was drafted by the Dodgers in first round of the 2024 Major League Baseball draft.

Lindsey attended Hardee High School in Wauchula, Florida.

Lindsey was drafted in the first round of the 2024 Major League Baseball draft by the Los Angeles Dodgers. He signed with the Dodgers on July 23, 2024 for a $3.3 million signing bonus, the second highest ever for a Dodgers draft pick (behind Zach Lee). After spending the remainder of the 2024 campaign working out at the Dodgers spring training facility, Lindsey was assigned to the Class-A Rancho Cucamonga Quakes of the California League to begin the 2025 season and make his professional debut. He played in 28 games, with a .280 batting average, two homers and 19 RBI while missing most of the season with an injury. Lindsey spent 2026 with the new California League affiliate, the Ontario Tower Buzzers, where he batted .288 in 61 games with 11 home runs and 26 RBI. He was awarded as a league all-star at the end of the season.

- Career statistics from Baseball Reference (Minors)

=== Bo Lowrance ===
Bo Lowrance

Los Angeles Dodgers
- Third baseman
- Born: September 19, 2007 (age 19); Nashville, Tennessee
- Bats: Left Throws: Right

William Bowen Lowrance (born September 19, 2007) is an American professional baseball third baseman in the Los Angeles Dodgers organization.

Lowrance attended Christ Church Episcopal School in Greenville, South Carolina. As a senior, he hit .435 with 12 home runs.

Lowrance was drafted by the Los Angeles Dodgers with the 40th pick in the 2026 Major League Baseball draft. He originally committed to play college baseball at Duke University before changing to the University of Virginia. Lowrance signed with the Dodgers for a $3 million signing bonus on July 27, 2026.

- Career statistics from Baseball Reference (Minors)

=== Payton Martin ===
Payton Martin

Los Angeles Dodgers
- Pitcher
- Born: May 19, 2004 (age 22); Clemmons, North Carolina, U.S.
- Bats: Right Throws: Right

Payton Martin (born May 19, 2004) is an American professional baseball pitcher in the Los Angeles Dodgers organization.

Martin attended West Forsyth High School in Cumming, Georgia. He was drafted by the Los Angeles Dodgers in the 17th round of the 2022 MLB draft.

Martin made his professional debut in 2023 with the Rancho Cucamonga Quakes. He pitched in 14 games (12 starts) with a 2–1 record and 2.04 ERA. In 2024, he made six starts for the Quakes and 13 for the Great Lakes Loons, with a combined 3–6 record and 3.75 ERA. In 2025 he spent the season with the Loons, appearing in 18 games (16 starts) with a 6–4 record and 5.21 ERA. Martin was promoted to the Double-A Tulsa Drillers in 2026, where he was 6–3 with a 5.61 ERA in 23 games (21 starts) and had 82 strikeouts.

- Career statistics from Baseball Reference (Minors)

=== Emil Morales ===
Emil Morales
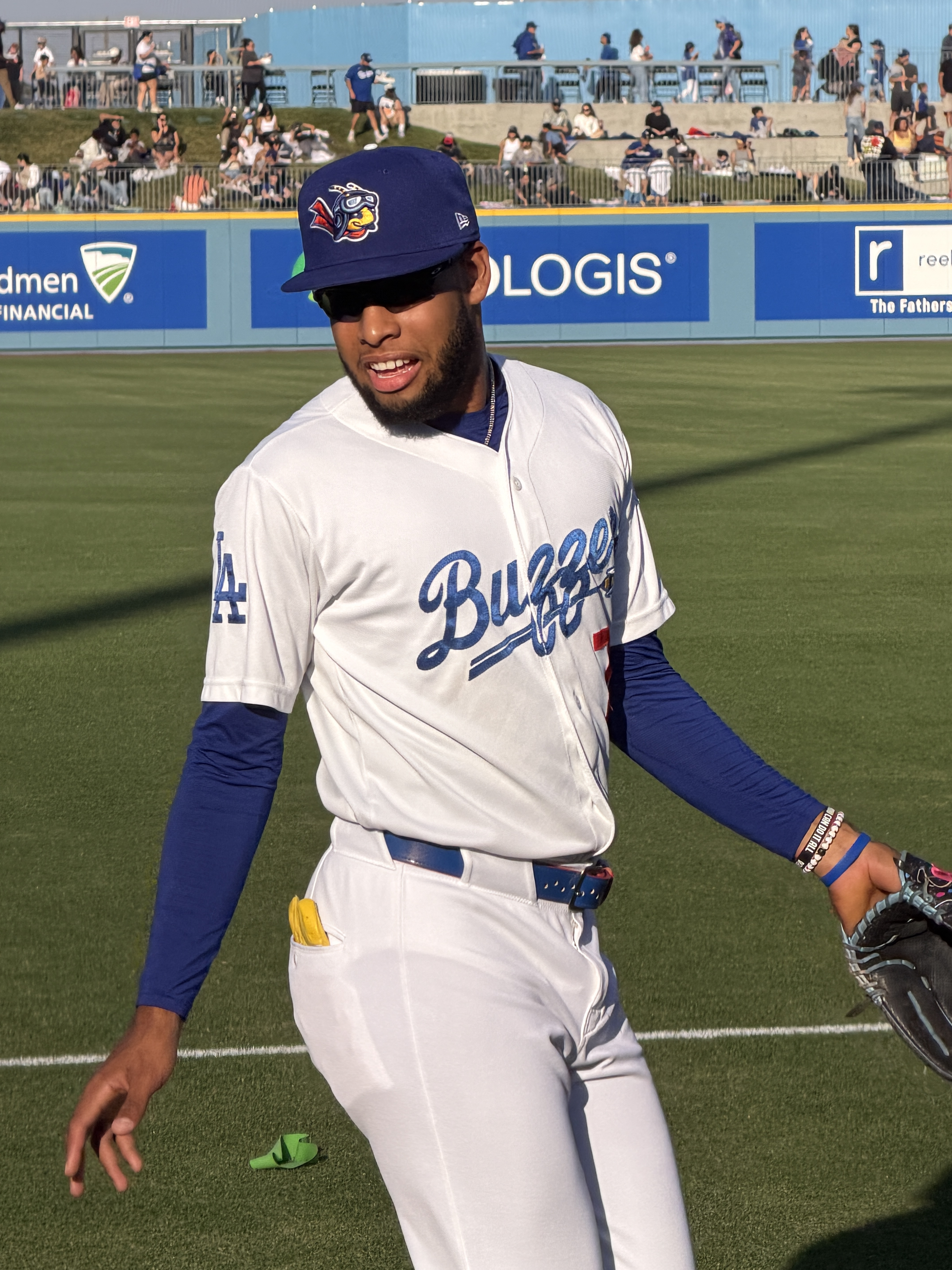
- Morales with the Ontario Tower Buzzers

Los Angeles Dodgers
- Shortstop
- Born: September 22, 2006 (age 20); Las Palmas de Gran Canaria, Spain
- Bats: Right Throws: Right

Emil Nicolas Morales (born September 22, 2006) is a Spanish professional baseball shortstop in the Los Angeles Dodgers organization.

Morales signed with the Los Angeles Dodgers as an international free agent in January 2024. He made his professional debut that year with the Dominican Summer League Dodgers and was named the Dominican Summer League MVP after hitting .342 with 14 home runs, 46 RBI and 12 steals in 46 games.

Morales started 2025 played 2024 with the Arizona Complex League Dodgers before being promoted to the Rancho Cucamonga Quakes. In 89 gams between the two levels, he batted .314 in 89 games with 14 homers and 70 RBI. He began 2026 with the Ontario Tower Buzzers, where he batted .323 with six home runs and 35 RBI in 36 games.

Morales was promoted to the Great Lakes Loons of the Midwest League on May 19, 2026, where he had a .323 batting average with six home runs and 35 RBI in 36 games. He was awarded with a selection to the league all-star team after the season.

- Career statistics from Baseball Reference (Minors)

=== Chris Newell ===
Chris Newell

Los Angeles Dodgers
- Outfielder
- Born: April 23, 2001 (age 25); Newtown Square, Pennsylvania, U.S.
- Bats: Left Throws: Left

Christopher John Newell (born April 23, 2001) is an American professional baseball outfielder in the Los Angeles Dodgers organization.

Newell attended Malvern Preparatory School in Malvern, Pennsylvania. He was drafted by the St. Louis Cardinals in the 37th round of the 2019 Major League Baseball draft, but did not sign and played college baseball at the University of Virginia. In 2021, he played collegiate summer baseball with the Harwich Mariners of the Cape Cod Baseball League. After three years at Virginia, Newell drafted by the Los Angeles Dodgers in the 13th round of the 2022 MLB draft and signed.

Newell made his professional debut with the Arizona Complex League Dodgers. He started 2023 with the Rancho Cucamonga Quakes before being promoted to the Great Lakes Loons. He hit .266 with 21 homers and 60 RBI in 83 games between the two levels. In 2024 he played in 124 games between the Loons and the Double–A Tulsa Drillers, batting .201 with 25 homers and 74 RBI. He returned to Tulsa for the 2025 season and batted .241 with 20 home runs and 80 RBI in 127 games.

Newell returned to Tulsa to start 2026 and was promoted to the Triple-A Oklahoma City Comets in early September. Between the two levels, he played in 109 games, batting .217 with 25 home runs and 78 RBI.

- Career statistics from Baseball Reference (Minors)

=== Eduardo Quintero ===
Eduardo Quintero
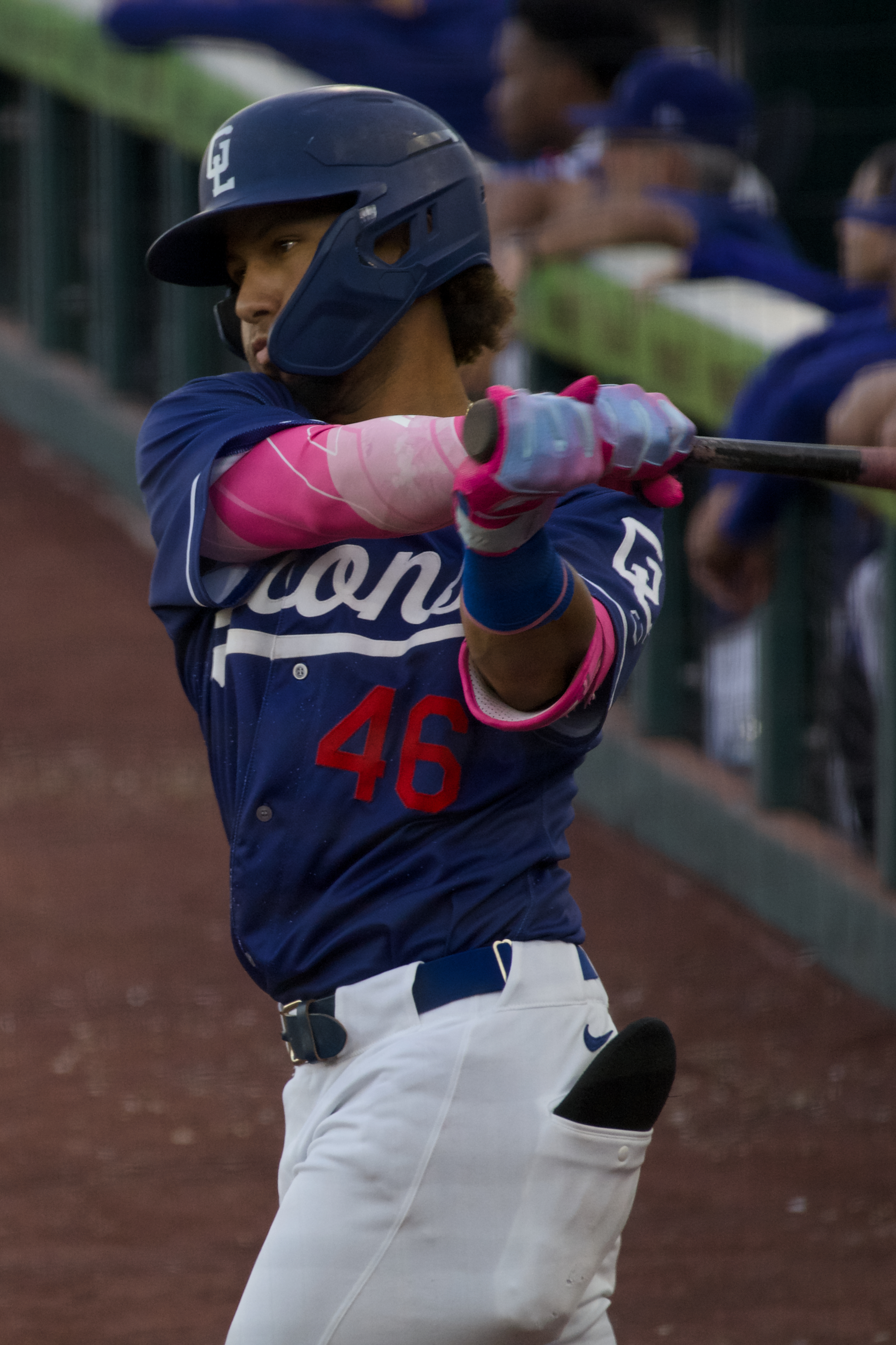
- Quintero with the Great Lakes Loons in 2026

Los Angeles Dodgers
- Outfielder
- Born: September 16, 2005 (age 21); Ocumare del Tuy, Venezuela
- Bats: Right Throws: Right

Eduardo Quintero (born September 16, 2005) is a Venezuelan professional baseball outfielder in the Los Angeles Dodgers organization.

Quintero signed with the Los Angeles Dodgers as an international free agent in January 2023. He made his professional debut that year with the Dominican Summer League Dodgers.

Quintero played 2024 with the Arizona Complex League Dodgers and Rancho Cucamonga Quakes, batting a combined .285 and started 2025 with Rancho Cucamonga before a mid-season promotion to the Great Lakes Loons. Combined, he batted .293 with 19 home runs and 63 RBI. He was named the Dodgers Branch Rickey Minor League Player of the Year for 2025. He also won the 2025 California League Most Valuable Player Award. Quintero remained at Great Lakes to start 2026. He played in 111 games, batting .309 with 12 home runs and 68 RBI and earned league all-star honors. Quintero was promoted to the Double-A Tulsa Drillers on the final day of the regular season and homered in his debut.

- Career statistics from Baseball Reference (Minors)

=== Adam Serwinowski ===
Adam Serwinowski

Los Angeles Dodgers
- Pitcher
- Born: June 7, 2004 (age 22); Taylors, South Carolina, U.S.
- Bats: Left Throws: Left

Adam Serwinowski (born June 7, 2004) is an American professional baseball pitcher in the Los Angeles Dodgers organization.

Serwinowski attended Eastside High School in Taylors, South Carolina. He was selected by the Cincinnati Reds in the 15th round of the 2022 Major League Baseball draft.

Serwinowski spent his first two professional seasons in 2022 and 2023 with the Arizona Complex League Reds. He pitched 2024 with the Daytona Tortugas (25 stats, 3.78 ERA) and started 2025 with the Dayton Dragons, where he made 17 starts with a 4.84 ERA.

On July 31, 2025, Serwinowski was acquired by the Los Angeles Dodgers in a three-team trade with the Reds and Tampa Bay Rays. The Dodgers assigned him to the Great Lakes Loons, where he made six starts with a 4–0 record and 1.83 ERA. He was promoted to the Double-A Tulsa Drillers for 2026, where he was 9–6 with a 5.31 ERA in 26 starts and struck out 150.

On November 17, 2026, the Dodgers purchased his contract and added him to the 40-man roster.

- Career statistics from Baseball Reference (Minors)

=== Christian Zazueta ===
Christian Zazueta

Los Angeles Dodgers
- Pitcher
- Born: October 7, 2004 (age 22); Navojoa, Mexico
- Bats: Right Throws: Right

Christian Zazueta (born October 7, 2004) is a Mexican professional baseball pitcher in the Los Angeles Dodgers organization.

Zazueta originally signed with the New York Yankees as an international free agent on January 17, 2022. He played with the Yankees affiliate in the Dominican Summer League for two seasons, with a 3–5 record and 2.44 ERA in 16 starts. On February 5, 2024, he was traded (along with Matt Gage) to the Los Angeles Dodgers in exchange for Caleb Ferguson.

The Dodgers assigned him to the Rookie-Class Arizona Complex League Dodgers to begin 2024 and he was promoted to the Class–A Rancho Cucamonga Quakes on June 7. Between the two leagues he was 4–5 with a 5.20 ERA in 19 games (11 starts). Zazueta returned to the Quakes in 2025 and then was promoted to the Great Lakes Loons on August 12. He made 17 starts between them, with a 2.42 ERA, 7–2 record and 81 strikeouts. He was selected as a post-season California League All-Star and honored as the Dodgers Minor League Pitcher of the Year. He returned to the Loons in 2026 but was promoted to the Double-A Tulsa Drillers in June. Between the two levels, Zazueta was 6–4 with a 3.65 ERA in 23 games (22 starts) and had 144 strikeouts. In his final start of the season, he struck out seven in five innings in a playoff game for the Drillers.

On November 17, 2026, the Dodgers purchased his contract and added him to the 40-man roster.

Zazueta is the son of Christian Zazueta. A former mexican baseball player who played for 19 years in the Mexican Baseball League and 16 years in Mexican Pacific League.

- Career statistics from Baseball Reference (Minors)

== Full Triple-A to Rookie League rosters ==
Below are the rosters of the minor league affiliates of the Los Angeles Dodgers

=== Triple-A ===
Oklahoma City Comets roster
Players		Coaches/Other
Pitchers: 18 Chris Campos; 33 Antonio Knowles; 56 Garrett McDaniels; 12 Griff McGarry; -- Carlos Peña; 45 Christian Romero	Catchers: -- Christian Cerda; Infielders: 12 David Bote ‡; -- Tyler Fitzgerald; 7 Noah Miller; Outfielders: 4 Zach Ehrhard; 17 Chris Newell; 8 Mike Sirota; 3 James Tibbs III	Manager: 46 Scott Hennessey; Coaches: 16 David Anderson (pitching); 26 David Dahl (outfield); 48 Ryan Dennick (pitching); -- Paul Fournier (performance); -- KJ Hallgren (coach); 52 Tyler Hollow (development); 47 Dylan Nasiastka (hitting); -- Ethan Quarles (performance); 30 Dickie Joe Thon (bench); 7-day injured list; * On Los Angeles Dodgers 40-man roster; ~ Development list; # Rehab assignment; ∞ Reserve list; ‡ Restricted list; § Suspended list; † Temporarily inactive list; Roster updated November 17 2026; Transactions; → More rosters: MiLB • Pacific Coast League; → Los Angeles Dodgers minor league players

=== Double-A ===
Tulsa Drillers roster
Players		Coaches/Other
Pitchers: 41 Myles Caba; 24 Patrick Copen; 2 Wyatt Crowell; 3 Cam Day; 47 Aidan Foeller; 7 Roque Gutierrez; 5 Peter Heubeck; 32 Carson Hobbs; -- Jared Karros; 12 Jacob Kmatz; 39 Payton Martin; 99 Kevin Ramirez; 23 Zach Root; 35 Christian Ruebeck; 17 Evan Shaw; 18 Lucas Wepf	Catchers: 28 Frank Rodriguez; Infielders: 6 Jake Gelof; 14 Elijah Hainline; 21 Jose Izarra; 4 Sean McLain; 45 Sam Mongelli; -- Kyle Nevin; 30 Joe Vetrano; 11 Logan Wagner; Outfielders: 25 Charles Davalan; 1 Kendall George; 5 Kole Myers; 9 Eduardo Quintero	Manager: 22 Eric Wedge; Coaches: 20 Jose Capellan (bullpen catcher); -- Tyler DeJong (development); -- Blake Gailen (hitting); 31 Johan Garcia (bench); 34 Durin O'Linger (pitching); -- Jake Taylor (performance); 40 Ramón Troncoso (pitching); 55 Juan Zabala (bullpen catcher); 7-day injured list; * On Los Angeles Dodgers 40-man roster; ~ Development list; # Rehab assignment; ∞ Reserve list; ‡ Restricted list; § Suspended list; † Temporarily inactive list; Roster updated November 19, 2026; Transactions; → More rosters: MiLB • Texas League; → Los Angeles Dodgers minor league players

=== High-A ===
Great Lakes Loons roster
Players		Coaches/Other
Pitchers: 34 Brooks Auger; 39 Isaac Ayon; 10 Seamus Barrett; -- Ryan Brown; 28 Maddux Bruns; 41 Justin Chambers; 20 Davis Chastain; 8 Nicolas Cruz; 11 Dilan Figueredo; 45 Jacob Frost; 44 Will Gagnon; 1 Joseilyn Gonzalez; 25 Tyler Gough; 26 Hyun-seok Jang; 19 Matt Lanzendorfer; 16 Cam Leiter; 5 Alex Makarewich; 30 Cody Morse; 9 Sterling Patick; 35 Robby Porco; -- Noah Ruen; -- Logan Tabling; 14 Jakob Wright; 15 Reynaldo Yean	Catchers: 33 Andson Aroz; 17 Gio Cueto; -- Jesus Galiz; 51 Victor Rodrigues; Infielders: 16 Cameron Decker; 13 Eduardo Guerrero; 12 Chase Harlan; 3 Mairo Martinus; 7 Emil Morales; 21 Nico Perez; Outfielders: 36 Jaron Elkins; 22 Samuel Munoz	Manager: 18 Jair Fernandez; Coaches: 19 Brandon Bailey (pitching); 10 Jose Capellan (bullpen catcher); 31 Richard De Los Santos (pitching); 26 Kupono Decker (development); 37 Marco Hernandez (bench); 24 Kevin Lachance (hitting); -- Walter Lindo (performance); 7-day injured list; * On Los Angeles Dodgers 40-man roster; ~ Development list; # Rehab assignment; ∞ Reserve list; ‡ Restricted list; § Suspended list; † Temporarily inactive list; Roster updated November 4, 2026; Transactions; → More rosters: MiLB • Midwest League; → Los Angeles Dodgers minor league players

=== Single-A ===
Ontario Tower Buzzers roster
Players		Coaches/Other
Pitchers: 43 Dailoui Abad; 99 Javier Bartolozzi; 00 Devin Bell; 52 Luis Carias; 17 Joel Cruz; 55 Mason Estrada; 49 Luis Gamez; 56 Jholbran Herder; -- Davion Hickson; -- Logan Lunceford; 33 Adriano Marrero; 10 Ian May; 66 Ricardo Montero; 21 Accimias Morales; 53 Marlon Nieves; 37 Jack O'Connor; 38 Brady Pendley; -- Samuel Sanchez; -- Dylan Tate; 46 Jesus Tillero; 47 Jose Vasquez; 81 Charlie West; 25 Camden Wimbish	Catchers: 77 Francisco Espinoza; 30 Bryan Gonzalez Garcia; 35 Connor O'Neal; Infielders: 7 Javier Herrera; 3 Caleb Johnson; 15 Kellon Lindsey; 65 Oswaldo Osorio; 28 Easton Shelton; 9 Joendry Vargas; 88 Aidan West; Outfielders: 44 Jose Gonzalez; 36 Ching-Hsien Ko; 6 Abel Lorenzo; -- AJ Soldra; 23 Kyeler Thompson; 27 Brendan Tunink	Manager: 12 John Shoemaker; Coaches: -- Michael Charters (development); 40 Johermyn Chavez (hitting); -- Sean Coyne (pitching); -- Jeremy Gaines (outfield & baserunning); -- Jose Gutierrez (performance); -- Ezra Lacina (bullpen catcher); -- Luis Vasquez (pitching); 48 Dunior Zerpa (bench); 7-day injured list; * On Los Angeles Dodgers 40-man roster; ~ Development list; # Rehab assignment; ∞ Reserve list; ‡ Restricted list; § Suspended list; † Temporarily inactive list; Roster updated September 11, 2026; Transactions; → More rosters: MiLB • California League; → Los Angeles Dodgers minor league players

=== Rookie ===
Arizona Complex League Dodgers roster
Players		Coaches/Other
Pitchers: 64 Aneudy Almonte; -- Zach Bates; 58 Tommy Case; -- Elijah Coston; -- Angel Cruz; 40 Yuliangel De La Cruz; -- Jack Giordano; -- Oliver Gonzalez; -- Miles Gosztola; -- Spencer Green; -- Wyatt Halvorson; -- Sam Horn; -- Jecsua Liborius; -- Josehp Marte; -- Cullen McKay; 22 Roiger Mujica; -- Cody New; -- Christian Oliveira; -- Nick Putnam; 51 Michael Ramirez; -- Ryne Rodriguez; 37 Williams Salazar; 59 Cesar Sanchez; -- Russell Sandefer; 59 Samuel Savinon; -- Ethan Sutton; 49 Jose Taveras; -- Adrian Torres; -- Gavin Van Kempen; -- Alex Walsh	Catchers: -- Luke Bard; 61 Jhon Gil; -- Eduardo Rojas; 17 Euri Rosa; Infielders: 54 Moises Acacio; 7 Moises Bolivar; 13 Harold Gonzalez; -- Elijah Ickes; 3 Yojackson Laya; -- Bo Lowrance; 62 Reyll Mariano; 8 Elias Medina; 18 Daniel Mielcarek; Outfielders: -- Agustin Acosta; -- Aemed Nasser	Manager: 86 Fumi Ishibashi; Coaches: -- Audy Ciriaco (Infield); -- Gage Crosgrove (Performance); -- Max DeLorme (Development); -- Juan Diaz (Hitting); -- Eduardo Dominguqez (Pitching); -- Cordell Hipolito (Bench); -- Ben Kim (Performance); -- Umar Male (Coach & bullpen catcher); -- Anthony Mulrine (Coach & bullpen catcher); -- Zach Reks (Hitting); 66 Andres Urbina (Pitching); 7-day injured list; * On Los Angeles Dodgers 40-man roster; ~ Development list; # Rehab assignment; ∞ Reserve list; ‡ Restricted list; § Suspended list; † Temporarily inactive list; Roster updated October 5, 2026; → More rosters: MiLB • Arizona Complex League; → Los Angeles Dodgers minor league players

=== Foreign Rookie ===
Dominican Summer League Dodgers Bautista roster
Players		Coaches/Other
Pitchers: 62 Allen Ajoti; 30 Kenry Alvear; 82 Tom Apfelbaum; 88 Ronald Buelvas; 50 Anderson Carias; 77 Delio Centeno; 47 Androu Gabriel; 90 Bryan Lara; 71 Yos Magallanes; 15 Randy Maria; -- Diego Paez; 38 Junior Pena; 91 Alexander Pichardo; -- Luis Ricart; -- Sebastian Rodriguez; 48 Shai Romero; 12 Ismanuel Rondon; 10 Roimer Rosas; 61 Eduardo Villegas	Catchers: 7 Oliver Chapman; 23 Aaron Guzman; 9 Haram Hernandez; 11 Ricardo Pulles; Infielders: 25 Willy Bergolla; 59 Adrian Del Cid; 52 Ezequiel Melburne; 8 Ariel Reynoso; 75 Edgar Sanchez; Outfielders: 13 Rubel Arias; 55 Yoansy Done; 31 Fran-Jean Haseth; 28 Jeibert Rondon	Manager: Leury Bonilla; Coaches: Antonio Bautista; Roger Caraballo (hitting); Jesus Canizales (pitching); Jose Rodulfo (pitching); Andre Ruche (hitting); Moisés Sierra; 7-day injured list; * On Los Angeles Dodgers 40-man roster; ~ Development list; # Rehab assignment; ∞ Reserve list; ‡ Restricted list; § Suspended list; † Temporarily inactive list; Roster updated September 1, 2026; → More rosters: MiLB • Dominican Summer League; → Los Angeles Dodgers minor league players

Dominican Summer League Dodgers Mega roster
Players		Coaches/Other
Pitchers: 41 Jose Acevedo; 37 Derik Aquino; 67 Geferlyn Avelino; 35 Albert Feliz; 40 Gregg Ferrera; 87 Miguel Herrera; 22 Jose Leon; 74 Eliezel Marte; 54 Angel Medina; 68 Michael Morfe; 83 Ivan Pacheco; -- Carlos Ramirez; -- Ricardo Roman; 59 Francisco Tavarez; 00 Joseph Deng Thon; 70 Logan Tinkam; 89 Victor Tovar; 65 Nehemias Valdez; 76 Yadier Zamora	Catchers: 73 Ezequiel Aparicio; 56 Jose Rivas; 64 Roberto Saucedo; Infielders: 4 Henry Arvelo; 5 Bryana Holguin; 57 Luis Luna; 63 Juan Macero; 27 Christian Polanco; 33 Luis Tovar; 21 Antoni Urena; 51 Jose Victorino; Outfielders: 29 Helvin Mendoza; 36 Erny Orellana; 16 Rafy Peguero; 79 Jesus Villaflor	Manager: Sergio Mendez; Coaches: Raidel Chacon (pitching); Roberto Giron (pitching); Danny Ortega (hitting); Victor Sosa (hitting); 7-day injured list; * On Los Angeles Dodgers 40-man roster; ~ Development list; # Rehab assignment; ∞ Reserve list; ‡ Restricted list; § Suspended list; † Temporarily inactive list; Roster updated September 1, 2026; → More rosters: MiLB • Dominican Summer League; → Los Angeles Dodgers minor league players

=== Arizona Fall League ===
Glendale Desert Dogs roster
Players		Coaches/Other
Pitchers: 32 Nick Altermatt (CWS); 36 Brooks Auger (LAD); -- Tanner Bauman (ATL); 29 Brandon Cain (PIT); 54 Samuel Carpio (MIA); 43 Johnathan Clark (CWS); 5 Luke Fox (LAD); 53 Pierce George (CWS); 24 Owen Hackman (ATL); 21 Sam Horn (LAD); 35 Cameron Keshock (PIT); 37 Mathias LaCombe (CWS); 30 Tyler LaPorte (ATL); 45 Briggs McKenzie (ATL); 44 Brayan Mendoza (MIA); 31 Cody Morse (LAD); 10 Zander Mueth (PIT); 26 Marlon Nieves (LAD); 38 Emmett Olson (MIA); 55 Logan Samuels (ATL); 33 Tristan Stevens (MIA); 41 Cristhian Tortosa (PIT); 81 Michael Walsh (PIT); 28 Alex Williams (MIA); 48 Garrett Wright (CWS)	Catchers: 77 Anson Aroz (LAD); 23 Easton Carmichael (PIT); 20 Grant Magill (CWS); Infielders: 6 Charles Davalan (LAD); 7 Anthony DePino (CWS); 11 Chase Harlan (LAD); 2 Carter Johnson (MIA); 3 Wyatt Sanford (PIT); 25 Jhonny Severino (PIT); 12 Colby Shelton (CWS); 19 Tate Southisene (ATL); Outfielders: 27 Caleb Bonemer (CWS); 9 Owen Carey (ATL); 4 Isaiah Drake (ATL); 22 Dillon Lewis (MIA); 16 Eduardo Quintero (LAD); 18 Max Williams (MIA)	Manager: -- John Shoemaker; Coaches: -- Philip Caufield; -- Aaron Hill; -- David Perez; -- Toby Nagel; 7-day injured list; ~ Development list; # Rehab assignment; ∞ Reserve list; ‡ Restricted list; § Suspended list; † Temporarily inactive list; Roster updated September 18, 2026; → More rosters: MiLB • Arizona Fall League

== Player Development Staff ==
- Director, Player Development: Will Rhymes
- Director, Player Development: Matt McGrath
- Assistant Director, Player Development: Andrea La Pointe
- Vice-President, Minor League Pitching: Rob Hill
- Field Coordinator: Austin Chubb
- Pitching Coordinator: Don Alexander
- Latin America Field Coordinator: Luis Meza
- Coordinator, Strategy and Communication: Travis Barbary
- Hitting Coordinator: Carlos Asuaje
- Infield Coordinator: Elián Herrera
- Outfield and Baserunning Coordinators: Daniel Nava, Jeff Salazar
- Catching Coordinator: Rocky Gale
- Special Assistants, Player Development: Chris Archer, Nelson Cruz, Rocco Baldelli, Charlie Hough, Tyson Ross, Joel Peralta, Plácido Polanco, Rick Honeycutt, Ron Roenicke, José Vizcaíno, Eddy Rodríguez, Mike Tosar
