= Atlanta Braves minor league players =

Below are the rosters of the minor league affiliates of the Atlanta Braves:

== Prospects ==
=== Garrett Baumann ===
Garrett Baumann

Atlanta Braves
- Pitcher
- Born: August 15, 2004 (age 22); Oviedo, Florida, U.S.
- Bats: Left Throws: Right

Garrett Joseph Baumann (born August 15, 2004) is an American professional baseball pitcher in the Atlanta Braves organization.

Baumann attended Paul J. Hagerty High School in Oviedo, Florida. He was selected by the Atlanta Braves in the fourth round of the 2023 Major League Baseball draft. He signed for $747,500, forgoing his commitment to play college baseball at the University of Central Florida.

Baumann made his professional debut with the Single-A Augusta GreenJackets, appearing in one game. Baumann returned to Augusta for the 2024 season, starting 18 games and going 6–5 with a 3.18 ERA and 89 strikeouts over 99 innings. He played in one game for the High-A Rome Braves at the end of the season, throwing seven scoreless innings. Baumann was named to Atlanta's Spring Breakout roster during 2025 spring training. He was assigned to Rome for the 2025 season and started 23 games in which he went 6–9 with a 3.40 ERA and 108 strikeouts over 113 2/3 innings. Baumann was assigned to the Double-A Columbus Clingstones to begin the 2026 season and was promoted to the Triple-A Gwinnett Stripers in June. Across 24 starts between both teams, he had a 9–8 record, a 5.43 ERA, and 116 strikeouts over 119 1/3 innings.

- Career statistics from MLB · Baseball Reference (Minors)

=== Owen Carey ===
Owen Carey

Atlanta Braves
- Outfielder
- Born: July 22, 2006 (age 20); Manchester, New Hampshire, U.S.
- Bats: Left Throws: Left

Owen Phillips Carey (born July 22, 2006) is an American professional baseball outfielder in the Atlanta Braves organization.

Carey attended Londonderry High School in Londonderry, New Hampshire, where he played both baseball and hockey. He was selected by the Atlanta Braves in the 15th round of the 2024 Major League Baseball draft.

Carey made his professional debut with the Augusta GreenJackets. He started 2026 with the Rome Emperors before being promoted to the Columbus Clingstones. After the 2026 season ended, Carey played in the Arizona Fall League with the Glendale Desert Dogs.

- Career statistics from Baseball Reference (Minors)

=== Patrick Clohisy ===
Patrick Clohisy

Atlanta Braves
- Outfielder
- Born: December 6, 2001 (age 24); St. Louis, Missouri, U.S.
- Bats: Left Throws: Right

Patrick Michael Clohisy (born December 6, 2001) is an American professional baseball outfielder in the Atlanta Braves organization.

Clohisy attended both Chaminade College Preparatory School in Creve Coeur, Missouri. He played college baseball at Purdue University for one year and St. Louis University for two years. He was selected by the Atlanta Braves in the 11th round of the 2024 Major League Baseball draft.

Clohisy made his professional debut with the Augusta GreenJackets. After the 2025 season he played in the Arizona Fall League.

- Career statistics from Baseball Reference (Minors)

=== Cédric De Grandpré ===
Cédric De Grandpré

Atlanta Braves
- Pitcher
- Born: January 25, 2002 (age 24); Saint-Simon, Québec, Canada
- Bats: Right Throws: Right

Cédric De Grandpré (born January 25, 2002) is a Canadian professional baseball pitcher in the Atlanta Braves organization.

De Grandpré played college baseball at Chipola College. He was selected by the Atlanta Braves in the 13th round of the 2022 Major League Baseball draft. The Braves added him to their 40-man roster after the 2026 season.

- Career statistics from Baseball Reference (Minors)

=== Isaiah Drake ===
Isaiah Drake

Atlanta Braves
- Outfielder
- Born: July 15, 2005 (age 21); Atlanta, Georgia, U.S.
- Bats: Left Throws: Right

Isaiah Keon Drake (born July 15, 2005) is an American professional baseball outfielder in the Atlanta Braves organization.

Drake attended both Westlake High School and North Atlanta High School in Atlanta, Georgia. He was selected by the Atlanta Braves in the fifth round of the 2023 Major League Baseball draft. He signed with the team for $747,500, forgoing his commitment to play college baseball at Georgia Tech.

Drake signed with the Braves and made his professional debut with the Florida Complex League Braves, hitting .221 over 18 games. In 2024, he participated in the first Spring Breakout prospect showcase. He played the 2024 season with the FCL Braves and Augusta GreenJackets, hitting .159 with two home runs and 11 RBI over 74 games. Drake split the 2025 season between Augusta and the Rome Emperors, batting .272 with six home runs, 59 RBI, and 46 stolen bases over 116 games. He returned to Rome in 2026, recording 19 stolen bases and 12 home runs before a sprained thumb caused him to miss the remainder of the regular season. After Drake had recovered, he played in the Arizona Fall League for the Glendale Desert Dogs.

His brother, Kenyan Drake, played in the National Football League (NFL).

- Career statistics from Baseball Reference (Minors)

=== Conor Essenburg ===
Conor Essenburg

Atlanta Braves
- Outfielder
- Born: September 18, 2006 (age 20); Palos Heights, Illinois, U.S.
- Bats: Right Throws: Left

Conor David Essenburg (born September 18, 2006) is an American professional baseball outfielder in the Atlanta Braves organization.

Essenburg attended Lincoln-Way West High School in New Lenox, Illinois. A two-way player, he pitched to a 0.94 earned run average (ERA) with 94 strikeouts over 44 2/3 innings pitched as a senior while slashing .464/.591/.909 with 10 home runs and 49 runs batted in (RBI). Essenberg was selected by the Atlanta Braves in the fifth round of the 2025 Major League Baseball draft as an outfielder. He signed for an over-slot value of $1.2 million, forgoing his commitment to play college baseball at the University of Kentucky.

Essenburg made his professional debut in 2026 with the Single-A Augusta GreenJackets.

- Career statistics from Baseball Reference (Minors)

=== John Gil ===
John Gil

Atlanta Braves
- Shortstop
- Born: May 14, 2006 (age 20); Santo Domingo, Dominican Republic
- Bats: Right Throws: Right

John Deivi Gil (born May 14, 2006) is a Dominican professional baseball shortstop in the Atlanta Braves organization.

Gil signed with the Atlanta Braves as an international free agent in January 2023. He made his professional debut that year with the Dominican Summer League Braves. He played 2024 with the Florida Complex League Braves and Augusta GreenJackets and 2025 with Augusta and also played six games with the Columbus Clingstones.

Gil started 2026 with the Rome Emperors.

- Career statistics from Baseball Reference (Minors)

=== Eric Hartman ===
Eric Hartman

Atlanta Braves
- Outfielder
- Born: June 16, 2006 (age 20); St. Albert, Alberta, Canada
- Bats: Left Throws: Right

Eric Leon Perreault Hartman (born June 16, 2006) is a Canadian professional baseball outfielder in the Atlanta Braves organization.

Hartman attended Holy Trinity Academy in Okotoks, Alberta and played collegiate summer baseball for the Okotoks Dawgs. He was selected by the Atlanta Braves in the 20th round of the 2024 Major League Baseball draft. He was scouted by Cody Martin and signed with the Braves for $337,500.

Hartman made his professional debut in 2025 with the Florida Complex League Braves and Augusta GreenJackets. Between the two affiliates, he batted .240 with five home runs, 42 RBI, and 48 stolen bases. He began the 2026 season with the High-A Rome Emperors.

- Career statistics from Baseball Reference (Minors)

=== Herick Hernandez ===
Herick Hernandez

Atlanta Braves
- Pitcher
- Born: August 11, 2003 (age 23); Hialeah, Florida, U.S.
- Bats: Left Throws: Left

Herick Hernandez (born August 11, 2003) is an American professional baseball pitcher in the Atlanta Braves organization.

Hernandez attended Hialeah Senior High School in Hialeah, Florida and graduated in 2021. He played two seasons of college baseball at Miami Dade College. As a sophomore in 2023, he went 8–3 with a 2.86 ERA and was selected by the Cincinnati Reds in the 19th round of the 2023 Major League Baseball draft, but did not sign. Hernandez transferred to the University of Miami for the 2024 season. In his lone season with Miami, Hernandez went 3–7 with a 6.14 ERA and 95 strikeouts over 14 starts. He was selected by the Atlanta Braves in the fourth round of the 2024 Major League Baseball draft.

Hernandez made his professional debut with the Augusta GreenJackets and Rome Braves, making two starts and striking out 12 batters. He played the 2025 season with Rome. Over 22 games (21 starts), he went 3–6 with a 3.57 ERA and 127 strikeouts over 103 1/3 innings. Hernandez was assigned to the Columbus Clingstones to open the 2026 season and was later promoted to the Gwinnett Stripers while also making one rehab appearance with Augusta. Across 18 starts for the 2026 season, he had a 1–4 record, a 4.10 ERA, and 96 strikeouts over 74 2/3 innings.

- Career statistics from Baseball Reference (Minors)
- Miami Hurricanes bio

=== Jensen Hirschkorn ===
Jensen Hirschkorn

Atlanta Braves
- Pitcher
- Born: December 19, 2007 (age 18); Fresno, California, U.S.
- Bats: Left Throws: Right

Jensen Charles Oscar Hirschkorn (born December 19, 2007) is an American professional baseball pitcher in the Atlanta Braves organization.

Hirschkorn attended Kingsburg High School in Kingsburg, California. As a senior, he recorded a 0.71 ERA with 112 strikeouts across ten starts. Hirschkorn was selected by the Atlanta Braves in the third round of the 2026 Major League Baseball draft. He signed for an over-slot value of $3.9 million, forgoing his commitment to play college baseball at Louisiana State University.

- Career statistics from Baseball Reference (Minors)

=== David McCabe ===
David McCabe

Atlanta Braves
- Third baseman
- Born: March 25, 2000 (age 26); Oshawa, Ontario, Canada
- Bats: Switch Throws: Right

David McCabe (born March 25, 2000) is a Canadian professional baseball third baseman in the Atlanta Braves organization.

McCabe attended Everest Academy in Vaughan, Ontario, and played college baseball at the University of North Carolina at Charlotte. He was selected by the Atlanta Braves in the fourth round of the 2022 Major League Baseball draft.

McCabe made his professional debut with the Florida Complex League Braves. He began the 2023 season with the Low-A Augusta GreenJackets before being promoted to the High-A Rome Braves. Between the two affiliates in 2023, McCabe slashed 276/.385/.450 with 17 home runs and 10 stolen bases. Prior to the start of the 2024 season, he underwent Tommy John surgery. McCabe returned from the injured list at the end of July and finished the 2024 season slashing .137/.284/.214 in 35 games with the Double-A Mississippi Braves. To begin the 2025 season, he was assigned to the Double-A Columbus Clingstones.

- Career statistics from Baseball Reference (Minors)

=== Briggs McKenzie ===
Briggs McKenzie

Atlanta Braves
- Pitcher
- Born: October 11, 2006 (age 20); Raleigh, North Carolina, U.S.
- Bats: Left Throws: Left

Briggs Howard McKenzie (born October 11, 2006) is an American professional baseball pitcher in the Atlanta Braves organization.

McKenzie attended Corinth Holders High School in Wendell, North Carolina. As a senior, he recorded 138 strikeouts across 69 1/3 innings pitched, while only allowing four runs. McKenzie was selected by the Atlanta Braves in the fourth round of the 2025 Major League Baseball draft. He signed for an over-slot value of $3 million, forgoing his commitment to play college baseball at Louisiana State University. McKenzie made three starts for the Florida Complex League Braves in May 2026, pitched five innings for the Augusta GreenJackets on June 5, and was subsequently promoted to the Rome Emperors. At the end of the regular season, McKenzie pitched in the Arizona Fall League for the Glendale Desert Dogs.

- Career statistics from Baseball Reference (Minors)

=== Ian Mejia ===
Ian Mejia

Atlanta Braves
- Pitcher
- Born: January 31, 2000 (age 26); Nogales, Arizona, U.S.
- Bats: Right Throws: Right

Ian Mejia (born January 31, 2000) is an American professional baseball pitcher in the Atlanta Braves organization.

Mejia attended Sahuarita High School in Sahuarita, Arizona, pitching to a 4.30 ERA as a senior. He was drafted in the 35th round of the 2018 Major League Baseball draft by the New York Mets but opted not to sign with the team. He began his college baseball career at the University of Arizona before transferring to Pima Community College. During 2020 with Pima, he accumulated a 3–0 record and a 3.28 ERA, before transferring to New Mexico State University. As a redshirt sophomore with New Mexico State, he compiled a 6–4 record and a 4.29 ERA with 102 strikeouts. Mejia was selected by the Atlanta Braves in the 11th round of the 2022 Major League Baseball draft.

Mejia made his professional debut with the Florida Complex League Braves. He split the 2022 campaign with the FCL Braves, Augusta GreenJackets, and Rome Braves, compiling a 3.78 ERA with 13 strikeouts. Mejia spent the entire 2023 season pitching with Rome, accumulating a 4–11 record and a 4.69 ERA. He split 2024 with the Double-A Mississippi Braves and the Triple-A Gwinnett Stripers, pitching to a 3.80 ERA with 124 strikeouts. He began the 2025 season with the Double-A Columbus Clingstones.

- Career statistics from Baseball Reference (Minors)
- New Mexico State Aggies bio

=== Jose Perdomo ===
Jose Perdomo

Atlanta Braves
- Shortstop
- Born: September 20, 2006 (age 20); Maturín, Venezuela
- Bats: Right Throws: Right

Jose Gabriel Perdomo (born September 20, 2006) is a Venezuelan professional baseball shortstop in the Atlanta Braves organization.

Considered one of the top international prospects in the 2024 class, Perdomo signed with the Atlanta Braves for $5 million as an international free agent in January 2024. He made his professional debut with the Dominican Summer League Braves. During the 2024 season, Perdomo appeared in just eight games, slashing .250/.318/.250, while dealing with a hamstring injury.

- Career statistics from Baseball Reference (Minors)

=== Davis Polo ===
Davis Polo

Atlanta Braves
- Pitcher
- Born: October 27, 2004 (age 22); Cali, Colombia
- Bats: Right Throws: Right

Davis Polo (born October 27, 2004) is a Colombian professional baseball pitcher in the Atlanta Braves organization.

Polo signed with the Atlanta Braves as an international free agent in April 2022. The Braves added him to their 40-man roster after the 2026 season.

- Career statistics from Baseball Reference (Minors)

=== Brett Sears ===
Brett Sears

Atlanta Braves
- Pitcher
- Born: May 2, 2000 (age 26); Harlan, Iowa, U.S.
- Bats: Right Throws: Right

Brett Andrew Sears (born May 2, 2000) is an American professional baseball pitcher in the Atlanta Braves organization.

Sears attended Harlan Community High School in Harlan, Iowa. He enrolled at Western Illinois University to play college baseball. After two seasons at Western Illinois, he transferred to Iowa Central Community College. After a season at Iowa Central, Sears transferred for a second time to the University of Nebraska–Lincoln. For Nebraska in 2024, he logged a 9–1 record and 2.16 ERA with 101 strikeouts across 104 innings pitched. As a result, Sears was named the Big Ten Pitcher of the Year. He was selected by the Atlanta Braves in the seventh round of the 2024 Major League Baseball draft.

Sears was assigned to the Augusta GreenJackets to make his professional debut and to open the 2025 season.

- Career statistics from Baseball Reference (Minors)
- Nebraska Cornhuskers bio

=== Luke Sinnard ===
Luke Sinnard

Atlanta Braves
- Pitcher
- Born: October 21, 2002 (age 24); Nashville, Tennessee, U.S.
- Bats: Right Throws: Right

Luke Alexander Sinnard (born October 21, 2002) is an American professional baseball pitcher in the Atlanta Braves organization.

Sinnard attended Beech Senior High School in Hendersonville, Tennessee, where he played baseball and was teammates with Chase Burns. He went unselected in the 2021 Major League Baseball draft, and enrolled at Western Kentucky University to play college baseball. After his freshman season, he transferred to Indiana University. For Indiana in 2023, Sinnard started 16 games and went 6–3 with a 4.27 ERA and 114 strikeouts over 86 1/3 innings. His 114 strikeouts set the Indiana record for single-season strikeouts. After the season, he underwent Tommy John surgery, forcing him to miss the entirety of the 2024 season. Despite this, he was still selected by the Atlanta Braves in the third round of the 2024 Major League Baseball draft.

Sinnard was assigned to the Augusta GreenJackets to make his professional debut and to open the 2025 season. In May, he was promoted to the Rome Emperors. He missed a month and a half during the season due to a right elbow stress reaction. Over 16 starts between the two teams, Sinnard went 2–6 with a 2.86 ERA and 86 strikeouts over 72 1/3 innings. He was assigned to play in the Arizona Fall League with the Glendale Desert Dogs after the season. Sinnard played the 2026 season with the Florida Complex League Braves, Rome, and the Columbus Clingstones. Across 14 starts between the three teams, he went 0–2 with a 2.94 ERA and 61 strikeouts over 52 innings.

- Career statistics from Baseball Reference (Minors)
- Indiana Hoosiers bio

=== Luke Waddell ===
Luke Waddell
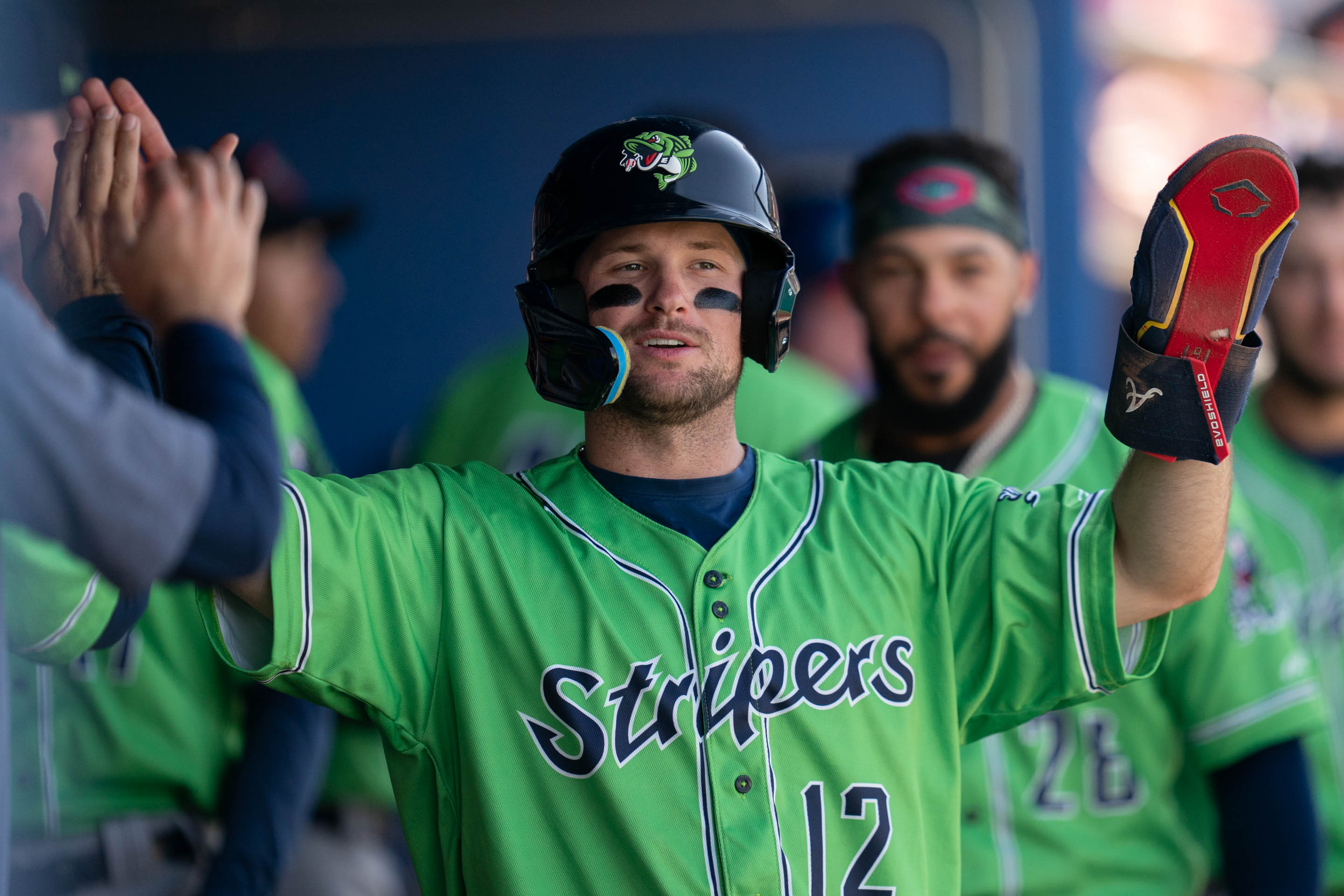
- Waddell with the Gwinnett Stripers in April 2024

Atlanta Braves – No. 82
- Shortstop
- Born: July 13, 1998 (age 28); Loveland, Ohio, U.S.
- Bats: Left Throws: Right

Luke Thomas Waddell (born July 13, 1998) is an American professional baseball shortstop in the Atlanta Braves organization.

Waddell was born in Loveland, Ohio, on July 13, 1998, to parents Eric and Lisa. His older brother is Reid. Luke Waddell attended Loveland High School. In 2023, he was inducted into the Loveland High School Sports Hall of Fame. In his high school athletic career, Waddell set several school records in baseball and American football, and as a high school freshman in 2013, was a member of the Loveland Tigers team that won Ohio's Division II state championship in football against Glenville High School, which featured future National Football League player Marshon Lattimore. While a high school student, Waddell also played on the Midland Redskins travel baseball team for three years. In 2017, his final year with the team, Waddell won a Connie Mack World Series championship. After graduating from high school in 2017, Waddell joined the Georgia Tech Yellow Jackets baseball team. Following the 2018 NCAA Division I baseball season, he played for the Yarmouth–Dennis Red Sox of the Cape Cod Baseball League. His 2019 season with Yarmouth–Dennis was cut short by his selection to the USA Baseball collegiate national team, which played in Japan and Taiwan. Waddell was named Georgia Tech's first solo captain since 1991 during the 2020 NCAA Division I baseball season, which was cancelled due to the COVID-19 pandemic. During the 2021 Georgia Tech Yellow Jackets baseball season, Waddell was honored with an All-Atlantic Coast Conference first team selection.

Waddell was selected by the Arizona Diamondbacks in 32nd round of the 2019 Major League Baseball draft, but returned to Georgia Tech. He was eligible for, but not chosen in the 2020 draft, and instead focused on completing his bachelor's degree in business administration. He was subsequently selected by the Atlanta Braves in the fifth round of the 2021 draft, and accepted a signing bonus of $247,500, which was approximately $85,000 under slot. Waddell was assigned to the Rome Braves, where he played 21 games, hitting .304/.372/.580. In September 2021, Waddell was promoted to the Mississippi Braves, and became the first Braves' draft pick of the 2021 class to reach the Double-A level. After the 2021 Double-A South season ended, the Braves sent Waddell to the Arizona Fall League, where he played for the Peoria Javelinas. Waddell began the 2022 season with the Mississippi Braves. Waddell was invited to spring training before the 2023 season. In March, he was assigned to minor league camp. Waddell was subsequently named to the M-Braves 2023 Opening Day roster. On April 14, Waddell was promoted to the Gwinnett Stripers. Waddell received another invitation to spring training before the 2024 regular season began. He remained with Gwinnett for the rest of the year, playing in 111 games, hitting for a .235 batting average while leading the Stripers outright in triples and tying for the team lead in runs batted in. In 2025, Waddell was invited to spring training for the third consecutive season. He began the 2025 regular season with Gwinnett. Waddell was invited to spring training for the fourth straight season in 2026. He was placed on the Stripers Opening Day roster, and appeared later that season for the Columbus Clingstones.

- Career statistics from MLB · ESPN · Fangraphs · Baseball Reference (Minors)
- Georgia Tech Yellow Jackets bio

=== Cory Wall ===
Cory Wall

Atlanta Braves
- Pitcher
- Born: March 14, 2000 (age 26); Roaring Brook, Pennsylvania, U.S.
- Bats: Right Throws: Right

Cory Lee Wall (born March 14, 2000) is an American professional baseball pitcher in the Atlanta Braves organization.

Harris attended North Pocono High School in Covington Township, Pennsylvania and played college baseball at Fordham University and College of William & Mary. As a senior with William & Mary, he recorded a 3.98 ERA with 63 strikeouts across 52 innings pitched. Wall was selected by the Atlanta Braves in the eighth round of the 2023 Major League Baseball draft.

Wall made his professional debut in 2023 with the Low-A Augusta GreenJackets, posting a 2–2 record with a 4.30 ERA and 15 strikeouts in nine appearances. In 2024, he pitched for Augusta and the Rome Emperors. He began the 2025 campaign with Rome before being promoted to the Double-A Columbus Clingstones.

- Career statistics from Baseball Reference (Minors)
- William & Mary Tribe bio

== Full Triple-A to Rookie League rosters ==
=== Triple-A ===
Gwinnett Stripers roster
Players		Coaches/Other
Pitchers: 52 Garrett Baumann; 48 Cedric De Grandpre; 71 Drue Hackenberg; -- Elieser Hernandez; 64 Herick Hernandez; 99 Davis Polo; 64 Brett Sears; 66 Luis Vargas	Catchers: 2 Maverick Handley; 32 Adam Zebrowski; Infielders: -- Vidal Brujan; 14 Cal Conley; 8 Lizandro Espinoza; 11 Jordan Groshans; 24 David McCabe; Outfielders: 61 Patrick Clohisy; 13 Kevin Kilpatrick Jr.	Manager: 50 Kanekoa Texeira; Coaches: 52 Craig Bjornson (bullpen); 38 Lance Carter (pitching); 53 Tyler Dalton (pitching); 9 Dan DeMent (hitting); 17 Angel Flores (coach); 30 Ruben Gotay (coach); 7-day injured list; * On Atlanta Braves 40-man roster; ~ Development list; # Rehab assignment; ∞ Reserve list; ‡ Restricted list; § Suspended list; † Temporarily inactive list; Roster updated November 2, 2026; Transactions; → More rosters: MiLB • International League; → Atlanta Braves minor league players

=== Double-A ===
Columbus Clingstones roster
Players		Coaches/Other
Pitchers: 23 Cam Caminiti; 27 Isaac Gallegos; 2 Owen Hackman; 17 Landon Harper; 20 Hayden Harris *; 51 Tyler LaPorte; 46 LJ McDonough; 16 Ian Mejia; 26 Shay Schanaman; 33 Braden Scott; 49 Luke Sinnard; 52 Samuel Strickland	Catchers: 32 Archer Brookman; 40 Austin Machado; Infielders: 1 John Gil; 23 Alex Lodise; 17 Tate Southisene; 28 Ambioris Tavarez; 8 Luke Waddell; 61 Dixon Williams; Outfielders: 32 Owen Carey; 12 Eric Hartman; 7 Dalton McIntyre	Manager: 4 Nestor Perez; Coaches: 19 Francisco Diaz (coach); 14 Grant Kay (hitting); 22 Mike Steed (pitching); 7-day injured list; * On Atlanta Braves 40-man roster; ~ Development list; # Rehab assignment; ∞ Reserve list; ‡ Restricted list; § Suspended list; † Temporarily inactive list; Roster updated October 2, 2026; Transactions; → More rosters: MiLB • Southern League; → Atlanta Braves minor league players

=== High-A ===
Rome Emperors roster
Players		Coaches/Other
Pitchers: 53 Ethan Bagwell; 52 Tanner Bauman; 33 Daniel Brooks; 99 Trent Buchanan; 61 Aiven Cabral; 66 Drew Christo; 50 Mathieu Curtis; 45 Colin Daniel; 49 Brody Fowler; 46 Riley Frey; 59 Jacob Kroeger; 32 Cade Kuehler; 60 Justin Long; 24 Carter Lovasz; 27 Briggs McKenzie; 28 David Rodriguez; 99 Zach Royse; 51 Logan Samuels; 54 Tyler Schoff; 37 Cory Wall	Catchers: 34 Colin Burgess; 4 Jacob Jarrell; 27 Tanner Smith; Infielders: 20 Cade Doughty; 22 Mason Guerra; 26 Colby Jones; 30 Cody Miller; 16 Will Verdung; Outfielders: 7 Carter Beck; 11 Logan Braunschweig; 4 Isaiah Drake; 18 Conor Essenburg; 2 Luis Guanipa	Manager: 13 Wynston Sawyer; Coaches: 55 Philip Caulfield (coach); 15 Connor Justus (hitting); 1 Bobby Moore (coach); 40 Horacio Ramírez (pitching); 7-day injured list; * On Atlanta Braves 40-man roster; ~ Development list; # Rehab assignment; ∞ Reserve list; ‡ Restricted list; § Suspended list; † Temporarily inactive list; Roster updated November 2, 2026; Transactions; → More rosters: MiLB • South Atlantic League; → Atlanta Braves minor league players

=== Single-A ===
Augusta GreenJackets roster
Players		Coaches/Other
Pitchers: 37 Cristobal Abreu; 60 Gensi Angeles; 77 Luis Arestigueta; 28 Landon Beidelschies; 33 John Damozonio; 43 Logan Forsythe; 23 Ryan Heppner; 38 Will Holmes; 70 Wil Libbert; 48 Adiel Melendez; 16 Jaylen Paden; 52 Styven Paez; 54 Yander Pinero; 46 Jeremy Reyes; 22 Kendy Richard; 55 Juan Sanchez; 67 Lewis Sifontes; 50 Derek Vartanian; 11 Nico Wagner; 30 Kade Woods; 37 Jay Woolfolk	Catchers: 62 Manuel Dos Passos; 38 Austin Fawley; 13 Dominic Kibler; 36 Nick Montgomery; Infielders: 2 Manuel Campos; 15 Yamvier Carrero; 12 Patrick Engskov; 19 Malvin Fernandez; 39 Juan Mateo; 26 Cooper McMurray; 4 Joe Olsavsky; -- Jose Perdomo; 46 Junior Tilien; Outfielders: 1 Parker Brosius; 16 Caleb Klein; 17 Dallas Macias; 54 Michael Martinez; 7 Caden Merritt; 24 Matt Scannell	Manager: 19 Brad Stoll; Coaches: 57 Rob Leary (coach); 27 Elvin Nina (pitching); 8 Jefferson Romero (coach); 18 Adam Wood (hitting); 7-day injured list; * On Atlanta Braves 40-man roster; ~ Development list; # Rehab assignment; ∞ Reserve list; ‡ Restricted list; § Suspended list; † Temporarily inactive list; Roster updated November 2, 2026; Transactions; → More rosters: MiLB • Carolina League; → Atlanta Braves minor league players

=== Rookie ===
Florida Complex League Braves roster
Players		Coaches/Other
Pitchers: -- Nile Adcock; -- Rayven Antonio; -- Logan Cummins; -- Cole Dennis; -- Cole Dorland; 78 Victor Duarte; 22 Cayman Goode; -- Tyson Grulkowski; -- Brady Hamilton; 39 Melvin Hidalgo; -- Jensen Hirschkorn; 98 Dayner Matos; -- Kaiden McCarthy; 38 Jorge Nunez; -- Marcos Pol; 9 Raudy Reyes; -- Ethan Stade; 73 Wuilinyer Tovar; 14 Luisberth Valdez	Catchers: 17 Yoelvis Betancourt; -- Jack Brenner; -- Dalton Harper; 16 Arlenn Manzanillo; 50 Jorwin Pulido; 46 Johan Rodriguez; Infielders: -- Ryne Barker; 4 Juan Elejandro; -- Troy Fisher; -- Ben Zeigler-Namoa; Outfielders: 96 Starlyn De La Cruz; -- John Estevez; -- AJ Gracia; -- Will Henderson; -- Elias Reyno; 61 Diego Tornes	Manager: 20 Cody Gabella; Coaches: 33 Sam Coe (pitching); 55 Einar Díaz (hitting); 19 Frank Duncan (pitching); 9 Yovan Gonzalez (coach); 23 Trey Polewsk (hitting); 15 Taylor Sanagorski (coach); 7-day injured list; * On Atlanta Braves 40-man roster; ~ Development list; # Rehab assignment; ∞ Reserve list; ‡ Restricted list; § Suspended list; † Temporarily inactive list; Roster updated November 2, 2026; Transactions; → More rosters: MiLB • Florida Complex League; → Atlanta Braves minor league players

=== Foreign Rookie ===
Dominican Summer League Braves roster
Players		Coaches/Other
Pitchers: 55 Hector Aguilar; 19 Efrailin Caminero; 52 Michael Castillo; 46 Josue Castro; 56 Jesus Cova; -- Francis Cuevas; 39 Kemil Custodio; 63 Geowin Gomez; 48 Eddie Guzman; -- Jonathan Hechavarria; 57 Matthew Luna; 58 Luis Mantilla; 37 Charlis Medina; 38 Giovanni Medina; 62 Ernesto Meza; 40 Cesar Navarro; 43 Darren Pereira; 60 Yostin Pinales; 45 Martires Polanco; 49 Abraham Prado; 18 Lionel Prevosti; 61 Diego Ramirez; 50 Derek Torres	Catchers: 34 Angelo Neira; 53 Jose Nelo; 15 Mayobanex Rosa; Infielders: 28 Durban Arnedo; 12 Edelson Cabral; -- Angel Carmona ‡; 30 Luis Fortunato; 2 Juan Hernandez; 1 Jose Manon; 4 Yassel Pena; Outfielders: 13 Luis Consoro; 23 Sherrintley Da Costa Gomez; 17 Elioberto Mondesir; 36 Elisandro Ramirez; 51 Osmar Torrealba	Manager: -- Maikol Gonzalez; Coaches: -- Leonard Ferrini (hitting); -- Cameron Jones (coach); -- Leandro Mateo (coach); -- Tyler Smith (pitching); -- Samuel Taveras (pitching); -- Carlos Telemaco (hitting); 7-day injured list; * On Atlanta Braves 40-man roster; ~ Development list; # Rehab assignment; ∞ Reserve list; ‡ Restricted list; § Suspended list; † Temporarily inactive list; Roster updated November 2, 2026; Transactions; → More rosters: MiLB • Dominican Summer League; → Atlanta Braves minor league players
