= Isaiah Drake =

Isaiah Drake may refer to:

- Isaiah Drake (born 2002), American artistic gymnast and former national team member
- Isaiah Drake (baseball) (born 2005), American minor league baseball player
