= 2024 Major League Baseball draft =

Major League Baseball Draft

2024 Major League Baseball Draft

General information
- Date: July 14–16, 2024
- Location: Cowtown Coliseum; Fort Worth, Texas
- Networks: MLB Network; ESPN, ESPN+ (first round)

Overview
- 615 total selections in 20 rounds
- First selection: Travis Bazzana; Cleveland Guardians
- First round selections: 39

The 2024 Major League Baseball Draft took place on July 14–16, 2024, in Fort Worth, Texas. The draft assigned amateur baseball players to Major League Baseball (MLB) teams. The first six selections were set via a lottery, with first round picks belonging to the remaining lottery participants set in reverse order of regular season winning percentage. To complete the first round, playoff teams selected in an order that combined postseason finish, revenue sharing status, and reverse order of winning percentage. Reverse order of regular season winning percentage and postseason finish was used to set the draft order for rounds two through 20.

The Arizona Diamondbacks were awarded a Prospect Promotion Incentive Pick after Corbin Carroll won the 2023 National League Rookie of the Year Award. The Baltimore Orioles also received a Prospect Promotion Incentive Pick after Gunnar Henderson won the 2023 American League Rookie of the Year Award.

The Cleveland Guardians won the 2024 MLB Draft Lottery and selected Travis Bazzana with the first pick. It was the first time that the Guardians had the first overall pick in the MLB Draft, the first time an Australian was drafted with the 1st overall pick, as well as the first time a second baseman was selected first overall.

Cam Smith of the Houston Astros and Ryan Johnson of the Los Angeles Angels made their MLB debut on March 27, 2025, making them the first players from the 2024 draft to make their major league debuts. Smith had been drafted by the Chicago Cubs before being traded to Houston that offseason.

== Draft lottery ==
The 2024 MLB Draft Lottery took place on December 5, 2023, in Nashville, Tennessee during the Winter Meetings. The Washington Nationals were ineligible to participate in the lottery, as per a rule in the collective bargaining agreement between Major League Baseball and MLBPA that limits teams in larger markets from winning draft lottery picks in consecutive seasons. The following table lists the percentage chances for each seed to receive lottery picks as a result of the draft lottery.

| Denotes lottery winner |
| Denotes team that did not win lottery |
| Ineligible to receive lottery pick |

| Seed | Team | 1st | 2nd | 3rd | 4th | 5th | 6th |
|---|---|---|---|---|---|---|---|
| 1 | Oakland Athletics | 18.3% | 17.4% | 16.2% | 14.8% | 13.0% | 10.9% |
| 2 | Kansas City Royals | 18.3% | 17.4% | 16.2% | 14.8% | 13.0% | 10.9% |
| 3 | Colorado Rockies | 18.3% | 17.4% | 16.2% | 14.8% | 13.0% | 10.9% |
| 4 | Chicago White Sox | 14.7% | 14.6% | 14.4% | 13.9% | 13.2% | 11.9% |
| 5 | St. Louis Cardinals | 8.3% | 8.9% | 9.5% | 10.2% | 11.0% | 11.7% |
| 6 | Los Angeles Angels | 6.1% | 6.7% | 7.3% | 8.1% | 9.0% | 10.2% |
| 7 | New York Mets | 4.3% | 4.8% | 5.4% | 6.1% | 7.0% | 8.2% |
| 8 | Pittsburgh Pirates | 3.0% | 3.3% | 3.8% | 4.4% | 5.2% | 6.2% |
| 9 | Cleveland Guardians | 2.0% | 2.2% | 2.6% | 3.0% | 3.6% | 4.4% |
| N/A | Washington Nationals | ∅ | | | | | |
| 10 | Detroit Tigers | 1.6% | 1.8% | 2.0% | 2.4% | 2.8% | 3.5% |
| 11 | Boston Red Sox | 1.2% | 1.3% | 1.6% | 1.9% | 2.2% | 2.8% |
| 12 | San Francisco Giants | 1.0% | 1.1% | 1.3% | 1.6% | 1.9% | 2.2% |
| 13 | Cincinnati Reds | 0.9% | 1.0% | 1.1% | 1.3% | 1.6% | 1.9% |
| 14 | San Diego Padres | 0.7% | 0.8% | 0.9% | 1.1% | 1.3% | 1.6% |
| 15 | New York Yankees | 0.6% | 0.6% | 0.7% | 0.8% | 1.0% | 1.2% |
| 16 | Chicago Cubs | 0.4% | 0.4% | 0.6% | 0.7% | 0.8% | 0.9% |
| 17 | Seattle Mariners | 0.2% | 0.3% | 0.3% | 0.4% | 0.4% | 0.6% |

== Draft selections ==
The Mets, Yankees, and Padres exceeded the surcharge tax threshold in 2023 and did not win lottery picks, meaning that each had their first round draft pick moved back ten slots.

Key
| | All-Star |
| * | Player did not sign |

=== First round ===
| Pick | Player | Team | Position | School |
|---|---|---|---|---|
| 1 | Travis Bazzana | Cleveland Guardians | Second baseman | Oregon State |
| 2 | Chase Burns | Cincinnati Reds | Pitcher | Wake Forest |
| 3 | Charlie Condon | Colorado Rockies | Outfielder | Georgia |
| 4 | Nick Kurtz | Oakland Athletics | First baseman | Wake Forest |
| 5 | Hagen Smith | Chicago White Sox | Pitcher | Arkansas |
| 6 | Jac Caglianone | Kansas City Royals | Two-way player | Florida |
| 7 | JJ Wetherholt | St. Louis Cardinals | Shortstop | West Virginia |
| 8 | Christian Moore | Los Angeles Angels | Second baseman | Tennessee |
| 9 | Konnor Griffin | Pittsburgh Pirates | Shortstop | Jackson Preparatory School (MS) |
| 10 | Seaver King | Washington Nationals | Shortstop | Wake Forest |
| 11 | Bryce Rainer | Detroit Tigers | Shortstop | Harvard-Westlake School (CA) |
| 12 | Braden Montgomery | Boston Red Sox | Outfielder | Texas A&M |
| 13 | James Tibbs III | San Francisco Giants | Outfielder | Florida State |
| 14 | Cam Smith | Chicago Cubs | Third baseman | Florida State |
| 15 | Jurrangelo Cijntje | Seattle Mariners | Pitcher | Mississippi State |
| 16 | PJ Morlando | Miami Marlins | Outfielder | Summerville High School (SC) |
| 17 | Braylon Payne | Milwaukee Brewers | Outfielder | Elkins High School (TX) |
| 18 | Theo Gillen | Tampa Bay Rays | Outfielder | Westlake High School (TX) |
| 19 | Carson Benge | New York Mets | Outfielder | Oklahoma State |
| 20 | Trey Yesavage | Toronto Blue Jays | Pitcher | East Carolina |
| 21 | Kaelen Culpepper | Minnesota Twins | Shortstop | Kansas State |
| 22 | Vance Honeycutt | Baltimore Orioles | Outfielder | North Carolina |
| 23 | Kellon Lindsey | Los Angeles Dodgers | Shortstop | Hardee High School (FL) |
| 24 | Cam Caminiti | Atlanta Braves | Pitcher | Saguaro High School (AZ) |
| 25 | Kash Mayfield | San Diego Padres | Pitcher | Elk City High School (OK) |
| 26 | Ben Hess | New York Yankees | Pitcher | Alabama |
| 27 | Dante Nori | Philadelphia Phillies | Outfielder | Northville High School (MI) |
| 28 | Walker Janek | Houston Astros | Catcher | Sam Houston |
| 29 | Slade Caldwell | Arizona Diamondbacks | Outfielder | Valley View High School (AR) |
| 30 | Malcolm Moore | Texas Rangers | Catcher | Stanford |

=== Prospect promotion incentive picks ===
| Pick | Player | Team | Position | School |
|---|---|---|---|---|
| 31 | Ryan Waldschmidt | Arizona Diamondbacks (Note: Received for Corbin Carroll winning the 2023 National League Rookie of the Year Award) | Outfielder | Kentucky |
| 32 | Griff O'Ferrall | Baltimore Orioles (Note: Received for Gunnar Henderson winning the 2023 American League Rookie of the Year Award) | Shortstop | Virginia |

=== Compensatory round ===
| Pick | Player | Team | Position | School |
|---|---|---|---|---|
| 33 | Kyle DeBarge | Minnesota Twins (Note: Compensation pick for the St. Louis Cardinals signing Sonny Gray) | Shortstop | Louisiana |

=== Competitive balance round A ===
| Pick | Player | Team | Position | School |
|---|---|---|---|---|
| 34 | Blake Burke | Milwaukee Brewers (Note: Brewers acquired the 34th pick, DL Hall, and Joey Ortiz from the Baltimore Orioles for Corbin Burnes) | First baseman | Tennessee |
| 35 | J. D. Dix | Arizona Diamondbacks | Shortstop | Whitefish Bay High School (WI) |
| 36 | Braylon Doughty | Cleveland Guardians | Pitcher | Chaparral High School (CA) |
| 37 | Levi Sterling | Pittsburgh Pirates | Pitcher | Notre Dame High School (CA) |
| 38 | Brody Brecht | Colorado Rockies | Pitcher | Iowa |
| 39 | Caleb Lomavita | Washington Nationals (Note: Nationals acquired the 39th pick and Cayden Wallace from the Kansas City Royals for Hunter Harvey) | Catcher | California |

=== Second round ===
| Pick | Player | Team | Position | School |
|---|---|---|---|---|
| 40 | Tommy White | Oakland Athletics | Third baseman | LSU |
| 41 | David Shields | Kansas City Royals | Pitcher | Mt. Lebanon High School (PA) |
| 42 | Jared Thomas | Colorado Rockies | Outfielder | Texas |
| 43 | Caleb Bonemer | Chicago White Sox | Shortstop | Okemos High School (MI) |
| 44 | Luke Dickerson | Washington Nationals | Shortstop | Morris Knolls High School (NJ) |
| 45 | Chris Cortez | Los Angeles Angels | Pitcher | Texas A&M |
| 46 | Jonathan Santucci | New York Mets | Pitcher | Duke |
| 47 | Wyatt Sanford | Pittsburgh Pirates | Shortstop | Independence High School (TX) |
| 48 | Jacob Cozart | Cleveland Guardians | Catcher | NC State |
| 49 | Owen Hall | Detroit Tigers | Pitcher | Edmond North High School (OK) |
| 50 | Payton Tolle | Boston Red Sox | Pitcher | TCU |
| 51 | Tyson Lewis | Cincinnati Reds | Shortstop | Millard West High School (NE) |
| 52 | Boston Bateman | San Diego Padres | Pitcher | Adolfo Camarillo High School (CA) |
| 53 | Bryce Cunningham | New York Yankees | Pitcher | Vanderbilt |
| 54 | Cole Mathis | Chicago Cubs | Third baseman | Charleston |
| 55 | Ryan Sloan | Seattle Mariners | Pitcher | York Community High School (IL) |
| 56 | Carter Johnson | Miami Marlins | Shortstop | Oxford High School (AL) |
| 57 | Bryce Meccage | Milwaukee Brewers | Pitcher | The Pennington School (NJ) |
| 58 | Émilien Pitre | Tampa Bay Rays | Second baseman | Kentucky |
| 59 | Khal Stephen | Toronto Blue Jays | Pitcher | Mississippi State |
| 60 | Billy Amick | Minnesota Twins | Third baseman | Tennessee |
| 61 | Ethan Anderson | Baltimore Orioles | Catcher | Virginia |
| 62 | Carter Holton | Atlanta Braves | Pitcher | Vanderbilt |
| 63 | Griffin Burkholder | Philadelphia Phillies | Outfielder | Freedom High School (VA) |
| 64 | Ivan Luciano | Arizona Diamondbacks | Catcher | El Shaddai Christian Academy (PR) |
| 65 | Dylan Dreiling | Texas Rangers | Outfielder | Tennessee |

=== Competitive balance round B ===
| Pick | Player | Team | Position | School |
|---|---|---|---|---|
| 66 | Tyler Bell* | Tampa Bay Rays | Shortstop | Lincoln-Way East High School (IL) |
| 67 | Chris Levonas* | Milwaukee Brewers | Pitcher | Christian Brothers Academy (NJ) |
| 68 | Blake Larson | Chicago White Sox (Note: White Sox acquired the 68th pick, Prelander Berroa, and Zach DeLoach from the Seattle Mariners for Gregory Santos) | Pitcher | IMG Academy (FL) |
| 69 | Dasan Hill | Minnesota Twins | Pitcher | Grapevine High School (TX) |
| 70 | Aiden May | Miami Marlins | Pitcher | Oregon State |
| 71 | Luke Holman | Cincinnati Reds | Pitcher | LSU |
| 72 | Ethan Schiefelbein | Detroit Tigers | Pitcher | Corona High School (CA) |
| 73 | Gage Jump | Oakland Athletics | Pitcher | LSU |

=== Compensatory round ===
| Pick | Player | Team | Position | School |
|---|---|---|---|---|
| 74 | Ryan Johnson | Los Angeles Angels (Note: Compensation pick for the Los Angeles Dodgers signing Shohei Ohtani) | Pitcher | Dallas Baptist |

=== Other notable selections ===
| Round | Pick | Player | Team | Position | School |
|---|---|---|---|---|---|
| 3 | 75 | Joshua Kuroda-Grauer | Oakland Athletics | Shortstop | Rutgers |
| 3 | 76 | Drew Beam | Kansas City Royals | Pitcher | Tennessee |
| 3 | 77 | Cole Messina | Colorado Rockies | Catcher | South Carolina |
| 3 | 79 | Kevin Bazzell | Washington Nationals | Catcher | Texas Tech |
| 3 | 81 | Ryan Prager* | Los Angeles Angels | Pitcher | Texas A&M |
| 3 | 82 | Nate Dohm | New York Mets | Pitcher | Mississippi State |
| 3 | 83 | Josh Hartle | Pittsburgh Pirates | Pitcher | Wake Forest |
| 3 | 84 | Joey Oakie | Cleveland Guardians | Pitcher | Ankeny Centennial High School (IA) |
| 3 | 87 | Mike Sirota | Cincinnati Reds | Outfielder | Northeastern |
| 3 | 90 | Ronny Cruz | Chicago Cubs | Shortstop | Miami Christian School (FL) |
| 3 | 92 | Gage Miller | Miami Marlins | Second baseman | Alabama |
| 3 | 94 | Nathan Flewelling | Tampa Bay Rays | Catcher | École Secondaire Notre Dame High School (AB) |
| 3 | 95 | Johnny King | Toronto Blue Jays | Pitcher | Naples High School (FL) |
| 3 | 96 | Khadim Diaw | Minnesota Twins | Catcher | Loyola Marymount |
| 3 | 97 | Austin Overn | Baltimore Orioles | Outfielder | USC |
| 3 | 98 | Chase Harlan | Los Angeles Dodgers | Third Baseman | Central Bucks High School East (PA) |
| 3 | 99 | Luke Sinnard | Atlanta Braves | Pitcher | Indiana |
| 3 | 102 | Daniel Eagen | Arizona Diamondbacks | Pitcher | Presbyterian |
| 4 | 108 | Jackson Kent | Washington Nationals | Pitcher | Arizona |
| 4 | 109 | Ryan Campos | St. Louis Cardinals | Catcher | Arizona State |
| 4 | 110 | Austin Gordon | Los Angeles Angels | Pitcher | Clemson |
| 4 | 115 | Zach Ehrhard | Boston Red Sox | Outfielder | Oklahoma State |
| 4 | 116 | Dakota Jordan | San Francisco Giants | Outfielder | Mississippi State |
| 4 | 118 | Tyson Neighbors | San Diego Padres | Pitcher | Kansas State |
| 4 | 120 | Ty Southisene | Chicago Cubs | Shortstop | Basic High School (NV) |
| 4 | 121 | Josh Caron | Seattle Mariners | Catcher | Nebraska |
| 4 | 123 | Marco Dinges | Milwaukee Brewers | Catcher | Florida State |
| 4 | 125 | Sean Keys | Toronto Blue Jays | Third Baseman | Bucknell |
| 4 | 129 | Herick Hernandez | Atlanta Braves | Pitcher | Miami (FL) |
| 5 | 138 | A.J. Causey | Kansas City Royals | Pitcher | Tennessee |
| 5 | 140 | Sam Antonacci | Chicago White Sox | Shortstop | Coastal Carolina |
| 5 | 142 | Braden Davis | St. Louis Cardinals | Pitcher | Oklahoma |
| 5 | 143 | Dylan Jordan | Los Angeles Angels | Pitcher | Viera High School (FL) |
| 5 | 145 | Will Taylor | Pittsburgh Pirates | Outfielder | Clemson |
| 5 | 148 | Brandon Clarke | Boston Red Sox | Pitcher | State College of Florida Manatee–Sarasota |
| 5 | 149 | Jakob Christian | San Francisco Giants | Outfielder | San Diego |
| 5 | 154 | Charlie Beilenson | Seattle Mariners | Pitcher | Duke |
| 5 | 156 | John Holobetz | Milwaukee Brewers | Pitcher | Old Dominion |
| 5 | 163 | Cole Hertzler | Houston Astros | Pitcher | Liberty |
| 5 | 165 | Devin Fitz-Gerald | Texas Rangers | Shortstop | Minnesota |
| 5 | 173 | Corey Collins | New York Mets | First baseman | Georgia |
| 6 | 168 | Konner Eaton | Colorado Rockies | Pitcher | George Mason |
| 6 | 181 | Griffin Herring | New York Yankees | Pitcher | LSU |
| 6 | 182 | Ryan Gallagher | Chicago Cubs | Pitcher | UC Santa Barbara |
| 6 | 182 | Payton Green | Miami Marlins | Shortstop | Georgia Tech |
| 7 | 197 | Dennis Colleran | Kansas City Royals | Pitcher | Northeastern |
| 7 | 200 | Robert Cranz | Washington Nationals | Pitcher | Oklahoma State |
| 7 | 203 | Will Watson | New York Mets | Pitcher | USC |
| 7 | 204 | Connor Wietgrefe | Pittsburgh Pirates | Pitcher | Minnesota |
| 7 | 221 | Brett Sears | Atlanta Braves | Pitcher | Nebraska |
| 7 | 223 | Joseph Sullivan | Houston Astros | Outfielder | South Alabama |
| 7 | 225 | Rafe Perich | Texas Rangers | Third Baseman | Lehigh |
| 8 | 239 | Luke Hayden | Cincinnati Reds | Pitcher | Indiana State |
| 9 | 272 | Brooks Caple | Chicago Cubs | Pitcher | Lamar |
| 11 | 322 | Trey Gregory-Alford | Los Angeles Angels | Pitcher | Coronado High School (CO) |
| 11 | 326 | Micah Ashman | Detroit Tigers | Pitcher | Utah |
| 11 | 333 | Christian Little | Seattle Mariners | Pitcher | LSU |
| 11 | 343 | Jason Schiavone | Houston Astros | Catcher | James Madison |
| 11 | 345 | Dalton Pence | Texas Rangers | Pitcher | North Carolina |
| 12 | 365 | Tyson Hardin | Milwaukee Brewers | Pitcher | Mississippi State |
| 13 | 383 | R.J. Gordon | New York Mets | Pitcher | Oregon |
| 13 | 391 | Dillon Lewis | New York Yankees | Outfielder | Queens |
| 13 | 403 | Bryce Boettcher | Houston Astros | Outfielder | Oregon |
| 14 | 413 | Tanner Witt | New York Mets | Pitcher | Texas |
| 14 | 428 | Jacob Kisting | Minnesota Twins | Pitcher | Bradley |
| 16 | 471 | Deniel Ortiz | St. Louis Cardinals | Third baseman | Walters State CC |
| 16 | 489 | Nate George | Baltimore Orioles | Outfielder | Minooka High School (IL) |
| 16 | 493 | Bryce Mayer | Houston Astros | Pitcher | Missouri |
| 17 | 502 | Lucas Ramirez | Los Angeles Angels | Outfielder | American Heritage High School (FL) |
| 18 | 544 | Nate Payne | Miami Marlins | Outfielder | Central Dauphin High School (PA) |
| 19 | 561 | Brendan Lawson* | St. Louis Cardinals | Shortstop | P27 Baseball Academy (SC) |
| 20 | 586 | Dylan Volantis* | Oakland Athletics | Pitcher | Westlake High School (CA) |

== Notes ==
Incentive picks

Compensation picks

Trades
