= Columbus Clingstones =

Minor League Baseball team in Columbus, Georgia

- Founded in 2025; Columbus, Georgia
Team logo
Cap insignia

Minor league affiliations
- Class: Double-A (2025–present)
- League: Southern League (2025–present)
- Division: South

Major league affiliations
- Team: Atlanta Braves (2025–present)

Team data
- Name: Columbus Clingstones
- Colors: Black, peach, Kelly green, white
- Mascot: Fuzzy
- Ballpark: Pinnacle Park
- Owner/ Operator: Diamond Baseball Holdings
- Manager: Néstor Pérez
- Website: milb.com/columbus-clingstones

The Columbus Clingstones are a Minor League Baseball team of the Southern League and the Double-A affiliate of the Atlanta Braves. They are located in Columbus, Georgia, and play their home games at Pinnacle Park.

They relocated to Columbus from Pearl, Mississippi, a suburb of Jackson, after the 2024 season, when they were known as the Mississippi Braves.

== History ==
In 2004, the Greenville Braves, which had played in Greenville, South Carolina since 1984, were relocated to Pearl, Mississippi as the Mississippi Braves after disagreements with the Greenville City Council over a new ballpark. In May 2023, the Columbus city council supported Mayor Skip Henderson's efforts to attract a minor league team to the city. The city later approved a $50-million renovation to Pinnacle Park to bring the stadium up to minor league standards. In January 2024, the Mississippi Braves announced they would relocate to Columbus, Georgia, and begin play in the 2025 season.

The club announced its nickname, Clingstones, after a variety of peach, on September 6, 2024. The name of their mascot, Fuzzy, was announced in November 2024.

The Clingstones lost 5–3 in their inaugural game to the Montgomery Biscuits on April 4, 2025, at Montgomery's Riverwalk Stadium. They had a 58–77 record in their first season.

== Roster ==
Columbus Clingstones roster
Players	Coaches/Other
Pitchers: 18 Blayne Abeyta; 23 Cam Caminiti; 27 Isaac Gallegos; 2 Owen Hackman; 20 Hayden Harris *; 51 Tyler LaPorte; 46 LJ McDonough; 16 Ian Mejia; 38 Julio Robaina; 26 Shay Schanaman; 33 Braden Scott; 49 Luke Sinnard; 52 Samuel Strickland; Catchers: 32 Archer Brookman; 40 Austin Machado; Infielders: 1 John Gil; 23 Alex Lodise; 17 Tate Southisene; 28 Ambioris Tavarez; 59 Carson Taylor; 8 Luke Waddell; 61 Dixon Williams; Outfielders: 32 Owen Carey; 12 Eric Hartman; 7 Dalton McIntyre	Manager: 4 Nestor Perez; Coaches: 19 Francisco Diaz (coach); 14 Grant Kay (hitting); 22 Mike Steed (pitching); 60-day injured list: 17 Landon Harper (full season); 7-day injured list; * On Atlanta Braves 40-man roster; ~ Development list; # Rehab assignment; ∞ Reserve list; ‡ Restricted list; § Suspended list; † Temporarily inactive list; Roster updated September 15, 2026; Transactions; → More rosters: MiLB • Southern League; → Atlanta Braves minor league players
