= Charlie Beilenson =

Seattle Mariners
- Pitcher
- Born: December 10, 1999 (age 26); Los Angeles, California, U.S.
- Bats: Right Throws: Right

Charles Graeme Beilenson (born December 10, 1999) is an American professional baseball relief pitcher in the Seattle Mariners organization.

Beilenson attended Chaminade College Preparatory School in West Hills, California. He played college baseball at Brown University for two years, and Duke University for two years. He was a consensus All-American his senior year at Duke in 2024. That year, he was 7-3 with 12 saves (tying the Duke single season record, and leading the ACC) and a 2.01 ERA (the second-best in Division I baseball) in 34 relief appearances. He pitched 62,2 innings in which he had 92 strikeouts (13.2 strikeouts/9 innings), a .181 batting average against, and an 0.957 WHIP.

Beilenson was selected by the Seattle Mariners in the fifth round of the 2024 Major League Baseball draft.

He made his professional debut that year with the Modesto Nuts, pitching 3.2 innings. He pitched in 2025 for the Everett AquaSox and Arkansas Travelers, with whom he was a combined 5-3 with 8 saves and a 4.75 ERA, in 62.2 innings in which he struck out 75 batters. He was injured in spring training, keeping him out for most of the year.

He started in 2026 with Arkansas, with whom he was 3-3 with 8 saves (tied for the Texas League lead) and a 2.03 ERA (2nd in the league, of all pitchers with 40 or more innings) in 40 innings in which he gave us 27 hits (holding opposing hitters to a .193 batting average against() and struck out 51 batters, with an 0.950 WHIP (2nd in the league). He then pitched 15 innings for the AAA Tacoma Rainiers, going 2-0 but giving up 20 earned runs. He was named a 2026 Texas League All Star.

Beilenson played for the Israel national baseball team at the 2026 World Baseball Classic, pitching 3.1 scoreless innings. He said beforehand: "This will be, by far and away, the biggest thing I've done in my life."
