= Bryce Rainer =

American baseball player (born 2005)

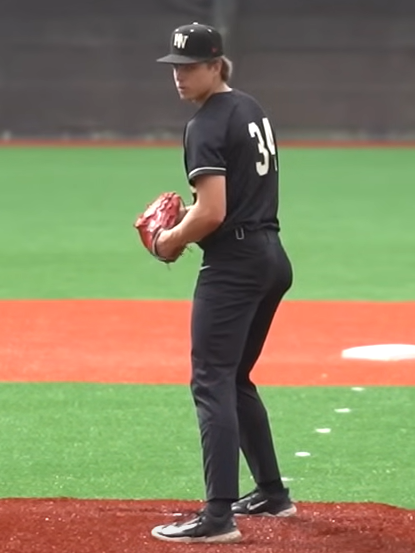
- Rainer pitching for Harvard-Westlake School in 2024

Detroit Tigers
- Shortstop
- Born: July 3, 2005 (age 20); Simi Valley, California, U.S.
- Bats: Left Throws: Right
- Stats at Baseball Reference

Bryce Michael Rainer (born July 3, 2005) is an American professional baseball shortstop in the Detroit Tigers organization. He was drafted 11th overall by the Tigers in the 2024 MLB draft.

== Amateur career ==
Rainer was raised in Simi Valley, California and attended Harvard-Westlake School. He batted .392 while also pitching for Harvard-Westlake during his freshman season and had a 9–0 record. He did not pitch during his sophomore year due to an arm injury. Rainer batted .436 with 34 hits and 19 RBI as a junior. He also returned to pitching and was part of a combined no-hitter. During his senior season, Rainer and Harvard-Westlake played in the National High School Invitational, and he hit had a .538 batting average during the tournament. He finished his senior year batting .505 with four home runs.

Rainer also played for the United States national under-18 team in the 2023 U-18 Baseball World Cup.

Rainer committed to play college baseball for the Texas Longhorns. He previously had committed to play for the UCLA Bruins.

== Professional career ==
The Detroit Tigers selected Rainer in the first round with the 11th overall selection of the 2024 MLB draft as a shortstop. On July 22, he signed with the Tigers on a $5.8 million contract.

Rainer made his professional debut in 2025 with the Single-A Lakeland Flying Tigers, batting to a .288/.383/.448 slash line with five home runs, 22 RBI, and nine stolen bases over 35 games. On June 7, it was announced that Rainer would require season-ending surgery to repair a dislocated right shoulder. Rainer returned to Lakeland to open the 2026 season with whom he hit .167 with one home run over 11 games. In mid-April, he was promoted to the High-A West Michigan Whitecaps.
