= Caleb Bonemer =

American baseball player (born 2005)

Chicago White Sox
- Shortstop
- Born: October 5, 2005 (age 20); Lansing, Michigan, U.S.
- Bats: Right Throws: Right
- Stats at Baseball Reference

Caleb Francis Bonemer (/ˈbɒnəmər/; born October 5, 2005) is an American professional baseball shortstop in the Chicago White Sox organization.

== Career ==
Bonemer attended Okemos High School in Okemos, Michigan. He was named the Michigan Gatorade Baseball Player of the Year in both his junior and senior seasons. Bonemer was selected by the Chicago White Sox in the second round of the 2024 Major League Baseball draft. He signed with the White Sox for $3 million, forgoing his commitment to play college baseball at the University of Virginia.

Bonemer made his professional debut in 2025 with the Kannapolis Cannon Ballers. Over 96 games with Kannapolis, he hit .281 with ten home runs, 58 RBI, 26 doubles, and 27 stolen bases. In August, he was promoted to the Winston-Salem Dash, with whom he played in 11 games to end the season. He was awarded the 2025 Carolina League Most Valuable Player Award for his performance with Kannapolis. He opened the 2026 season with the Winston-Salem Dash.
