= Glendale Desert Dogs =

Professional baseball team

- Founded in 1992; Phoenix, Arizona

Minor league affiliations
- Class: Class A to Triple-A
- League: Arizona Fall League (1992–present)
- Division: West Division (2011–present)

Major league affiliations
- Teams: Atlanta Braves; Chicago White Sox; Los Angeles Dodgers; Miami Marlins; Pittsburgh Pirates

Minor league titles
- League titles (6): 2001; 2004; 2005; 2006; 2007; 2008
- Division titles (9): 2000; 2001; 2003; 2004; 2005; 2006; 2007; 2008; 2009

Team data
- Name: Glendale Desert Dogs (2013–present)
- Previous names: Phoenix Desert Dogs (2004–2012); Mesa Desert Dogs (2003); Phoenix Desert Dogs (1995–2002); Chandler Diamondbacks (1992–1994)
- Ballpark: Camelback Ranch (2013–present)
- Previous parks: Phoenix Municipal Stadium (2004–2012); HoHoKam Park (2003); Phoenix Municipal Stadium (1995–2002); Compadre Stadium (1992–1994)
- Manager: Eric Duncan

The Glendale Desert Dogs are a baseball team that plays in the West Division of the Arizona Fall League. They play their home games at Camelback Ranch in Glendale, Arizona. The ballpark is also the spring training facility of the Chicago White Sox and Los Angeles Dodgers. The team was established in 1992 as the Chandler Diamondbacks, and played for three seasons under that name. The team's nickname has been Desert Dogs since 1995, persisting through several location changes. The Desert Dogs have won six league championships, most recently in 2008. Their five consecutive championships from 2004 to 2008 are an Arizona Fall League record.

The team discontinued use of its original nickname prior to the 1995 season, coincident with a move from Chandler to Phoenix. Earlier that year, Major League Baseball had awarded an expansion franchise to the Phoenix area, which began play in 1998 as the Arizona Diamondbacks.

== Roster ==
Glendale Desert Dogs roster
Players	Coaches/Other
Pitchers: 28 Alex Amalfi (TOR); 21 Tyler Bradt (STL); 14 Trent Buchanan (ATL); 30 D.J. Carpenter (STL); 51 Justin Chambers (LAD); 99 Randel Clemente (STL); 38 Tyler Davis (CHW); 53 Carson Jacobs (CHW); 12 Hyun-seok Jang (LAD); 48 Jacob Kroeger (ATL); 92 Jhancarlos Lara (ATL); 54 Chen-Wei Lin (STL); 18 Alex Makarewich (LAD); 40 Payton Martin (LAD); 29 Connor McCullough (CHW); 32 LJ McDonough (ATL); 22 Kai Peterson (TOR); 46 Yondrei Rojas (TOR); 44 Jarold Rosado (CHW); 26 Darlin Saladin (STL); 97 Luke Sinnard (ATL); 33 Hagen Smith (CHW); 37 Cory Wall (ATL); 95 Jakob Wright (LAD); 13 Chay Yeager (TOR); Catchers: 17 Edward Duran (TOR); 35 Jesus Galiz (LAD); 7 Graysen Tarlow (STL); Infielders: 67 Nacho Alvarez Jr. (ATL); 10 Sam Antonacci (CHW); 9 Cutter Coffey (TOR); 15 Ryan Galanie (CHW); 2 Jim Jarvis (ATL); 4 Josh Kasevich (TOR); 8 Nico Perez (LAD); 23 Logan Wagner (LAD); Outfielders: 24 Patrick Clohisy (ATL); 20 Caden Connor (CHW); 27 Josue De Paula (LAD); 34 Travis Honeyman (STL); 6 Braden Montgomery (CHW); 3 Miguel Ugueto (STL)	Manager: -- Eric Duncan; Coaches: -- Lance Carter (pitching); -- Chris Gutierrez; -- Elvis Rodriguez (hitting); 7-day injured list; ~ Development list; # Rehab assignment; ∞ Reserve list; ‡ Restricted list; § Suspended list; † Temporarily inactive list; Roster updated October 10, 2025; → More rosters: MiLB • Arizona Fall League

== See also ==
- Arizona Fall League#Results by season
