= Tate Southisene =

American baseball player (born 2006)

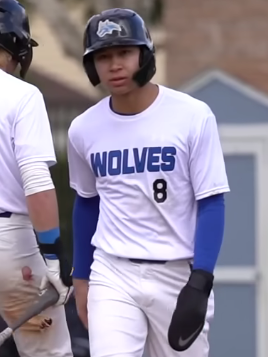
- Southisene with Basic Academy in 2024

Atlanta Braves
- Shortstop
- Born: October 6, 2006 (age 20); Henderson, Nevada, U.S.
- Bats: Right Throws: Right
- Stats at Baseball Reference

Tate Southisene (born October 6, 2006) is an American professional baseball shortstop in the Atlanta Braves organization.

== Amateur career ==
Southisene attended Basic Academy of International Studies in Henderson, Nevada. As a senior, he hit .495 with nine home runs, 33 runs batted in (RBI) and 16 stolen bases, being named the Nevada Gatorade Player of the Year. Southisene played center field on baseball teams that also featured his older brother Ty, and did not start playing shortstop until Ty had graduated. He committed to play college baseball at the University of Southern California, where his brother Tee had pitched.

== Professional career ==
Southisene was selected by the Atlanta Braves in the first round with the 22nd overall selection in the 2025 Major League Baseball draft. Southisene signed with Atlanta for a $2.6 million bonus on July 17, 2025. He made his professional debut with the Augusta GreenJackets and hit .219 across 15 games.

Southisene returned to Augusta to open the 2026 season. Southisene was promoted twice in June, first to the Rome Emperors, then the Columbus Clingstones, where his regular season ended the following month due to a hit by pitch. After he had recovered, Southisene played in the Arizona Fall League for the Glendale Desert Dogs.

== Personal life ==
Southisene is one of four brothers, all of whom have strong ties to baseball. His older brothers, Ty and Tee, are twins. Ty was committed to Tennessee but was selected by the Chicago Cubs in the fourth round of the 2024 Major League Baseball draft. Ty was traded to the Toronto Blue Jays in 2026 and currently plays in the Blue Jays organization. Tee has played baseball for USC and the College of Southern Nevada. His younger brother, Troy, was committed to play baseball at Oregon State.
