= Cam Caminiti =

American baseball player (born 2006)

Atlanta Braves
- Pitcher
- Born: August 8, 2006 (age 19); Scottsdale, Arizona, U.S.
- Bats: Left Throws: Left
- Stats at Baseball Reference

Cameron Dominic Caminiti (born August 8, 2006) is an American professional baseball pitcher in the Atlanta Braves organization.

== Amateur career ==
Caminiti is from Scottsdale, Arizona and attended Saguaro High School. As a sophomore he batted .446 with 29 hits, 31 runs scored, 25 RBI, seven doubles, two triples, and four home run. Caminiti reclassified from the class of 2025 to 2024. He was named the Arizona Gatorade Player of the Year as a senior after compiling a 9–0 record with a 0.93 ERA and 119 strikeouts as a pitcher while also batting .493 with three home runs, 33 runs scored, and 28 RBI. Caminiti pitched a complete game and struck out 11 batters while giving up one run in the Class 4A State Championship Game as Saguaro won 2–1 over Canyon del Oro High School. He committed to play college baseball at LSU.

== Professional career ==
Caminiti was considered a top prospect for the 2024 Major League Baseball draft. The Atlanta Braves selected him with the 24th overall selection in the draft. On July 19, 2024, Caminiti signed with the Braves for $3.6 million. He made his professional debut with the Augusta GreenJackets and gave up one earned run across three innings, marking his only appearance for the Braves organization in 2024. Following the end of the 2024 season, Caminiti was ranked 92nd on MLB.com's list of top 100 prospects.

Caminiti started the 2025 season with the Florida Complex League Braves, with whom he appeared in four games, and was promoted to Augusta on June 7. He started 13 games for Augusta and went 2-3 with a 2.08 ERA and 75 strikeouts over 56 1/3 innings. Caminiti was assigned to the Rome Braves to begin the 2026 season. In August, Caminiti was promoted to the Columbus Clingstones, and Baseball America ranked him the 60th-best Braves prospect.

== Personal life ==
Caminiti is a cousin of 1996 National League MVP Ken Caminiti.
