= Néstor Pérez =

Spanish baseball manager (born 1976)

- Shortstop / Manager
- Born: 24 November 1976 (age 49); Matanzas, Cuba
- Bats: Right Throws: Right
- Stats at Baseball Reference

Néstor Pérez Alonso (born 24 November 1976) is a baseball manager and former professional player who played as a shortstop. He is currently the manager for the Columbus Clingstones, the Double-A affiliate of the Atlanta Braves in the 2026 baseball season. Born in Cuba, he represented Spain internationally.

Pérez began his career in the Serie Nacional de Béisbol before defecting to the United States. He signed with the Tampa Bay Devil Rays organization in 1998, playing with the team's minor league system until 2005. During the 2005 season, he had a brief stint with the Colorado Rockies Double-A affiliate before returning to Tampa Bay to finish both the season and his Minor League Baseball (MiLB) career.

After leaving Minor League Baseball, Pérez played in the División de Honor de Béisbol, the highest level of baseball in Spain. In 2021, he was the manager of the Augusta GreenJackets, the Low-A East affiliate of the Atlanta Braves. In 2026, he was named as Manager of the Columbus Clingstones the Braves Double-A affiliate.

== International career ==
Born in Cuba, Pérez is of Spanish descent through his grandparents. He played for the Spain national baseball team in the 2003 European Baseball Championship, 2005 European Baseball Championship, 2005 Baseball World Cup, 2007 European Baseball Championship, 2007 Baseball World Cup, 2008 European Cup, 2009 European Cup and 2013 World Baseball Classic.
