= Seattle Mariners minor league players =

Below is a partial list of minor league baseball players in the Seattle Mariners system.

== Players ==
=== Josh Caron ===
Josh Caron

Seattle Mariners
- Catcher
- Born: August 3, 2003 (age 23); Eau Claire, Wisconsin, U.S.
- Bats: Right Throws: Right

Joshua Howard Caron (born August 3, 2003) is an American professional baseball catcher in the Seattle Mariners organization.

Caron attended Sun Prairie High School in Sun Prairie, Wisconsin, where he played baseball. As a senior in 2021, he batted .438 with eight home runs and 49 runs batted in (RBI) and helped lead Sun Prairie to a state championship. After graduating, he enrolled at the University of Nebraska and played three years of college baseball for the Nebraska Cornhuskers. As a junior in 2024, Caron played in 60 games and hit .308 with 16 home runs and 65 RBI.

After his junior season at Nebraska, Caron was selected by the Seattle Mariners in the fourth round of the 2024 Major League Baseball draft. He made his professional debut after signing with the Single-A Modesto Nuts and batted .277 with one home run across 13 games. He played the 2025 season with the High-A Everett AquaSox with whom he won the Northwest League Championship and hit .197 with nine home runs and 26 RBI over 79 games. Caron returned to Everett to open the 2026 season and was promoted to the Double-A Arkansas Travelers in July. Across 103 games between the two teams, he batted .258/.350/.525 with 22 home runs, 74 RBI, and 28 stolen bases while being caught four times. His 19 home runs with Everett were tied for fifth-most in the Northwest League and his .579 slugging percentage led the league.

- Nebraska Cornhuskers bio
- Career statistics from Baseball Reference (Minors)

=== Felnin Celesten ===
Felnin Celesten

Seattle Mariners
- Shortstop
- Born: September 15, 2005 (age 21); Guaymate, Dominican Republic
- Bats: Switch Throws: Right

Felnin Daniel Celesten (born September 15, 2005) is a Dominican professional baseball shortstop in the Seattle Mariners organization. His nickname is El Fénix.

Celestin signed with the Seattle Mariners as an international free agent in January 2023 for $4.7 million. He did not make his professional debut that year due to a hamstring injury he suffered in June.

Celestin made his professional debut in on May 4, 2024 with the Arizona Complex League Mariners. In 32 games, he hit .352 with 3 home runs and 5 stolen bases. He only played once after June 20, and his season ended in early August after he underwent wrist surgery. He was named the 74th best prospect in baseball by MLB.com before the 2025 season. He started 2025 with the Single-A Modesto Nuts.

- Career statistics from Baseball Reference (Minors)

=== Ty Cummings ===
Ty Cummings

Seattle Mariners
- Pitcher
- Born: November 1, 2001 (age 25); Clayton, North Carolina, U.S.
- Bats: Left Throws: Left

Ty Brendan Cummings (born November 1, 2001) is an American professional baseball pitcher in the Seattle Mariners organization.

Cummings attended Corinth Holders High School and played college baseball at Campbell University. In 2022, he played collegiate summer baseball with the Bourne Braves of the Cape Cod Baseball League and was named a league all-star. After his junior season, he was selected by the Seattle Mariners in the seventh round of the 2023 Major League Baseball draft. He signed for $225,000.

Cummings made his professional debut in 2024 with the Everett AquaSox. He started 25 games and was 4–5 with a 4.17 ERA and 124 strikeouts over 116 2/3 innings. On October 4, 2024, Cummings was traded to the Tampa Bay Rays as the player to be named later in the Randy Arozarena trade. He was assigned to the Montgomery Biscuits to open the 2025 season and was named the Southern League Pitcher of the Week in April. Cummings also appeared in three games for the Durham Bulls. Over 29 games (20 starts) for the season, he went 8–4 with a 3.29 ERA and 92 strikeouts over 123 innings. Cummings returned to Montgomery to start the 2026 season, now pitching as a reliever, and made three appearances for the team.

On April 24, 2026, the Rays traded Cummings back to the Mariners in exchange for Casey Legumina. The Mariners assigned him to the Arkansas Travelers. Across 37 relief appearances for Arkansas, Cummings went 3–2 with a 6.04 ERA and 45 strikeouts over 56 2/3 innings. After the season, he was assigned to play in the Arizona Fall League with the Peoria Javelinas.

- Career statistics from Baseball Reference (Minors)
- Campbell Camels bio

=== Jonny Farmelo ===
Jonny Farmelo

Seattle Mariners
- Outfielder
- Born: September 9, 2004 (age 22); Centreville, Virginia, U.S.
- Bats: Left Throws: Right

Jonathan Thomas Farmelo (born September 9, 2004) is an American professional baseball outfielder in the Seattle Mariners organization.

Farmelo attended Westfield High School in Fairfax County, Virginia. In high school, he had a .385 batting average, seven home runs, and 29 RBIs in 48 career games. As a senior, Farmelo batted .478. Farmelo committed to play college baseball at the University of Virginia.

Farmelo was selected 29th overall by the Seattle Mariners in the 2023 Major League Baseball draft. He signed with the Mariners on July 17 for an over-slot bonus of $3.2 million.

Farmelo joined the Single-A Modesto Nuts for the 2023 playoffs, playing as an outfielder. He hit .200 in four games, with one triple and one home run. Farmelo returned to Modesto in 2024, but he tore his ACL in mid-June while trying to catch a pop-up, ending his season. In 46 games before the injury, he hit .264 with four home runs and 18 stolen bases. Prior to the 2025 season, Farmelo was named the 96th best prospect in baseball by MLB.com. Farmelo returned to play that May with Everett. In June, he was placed on the injured list with a stress reaction in his rib, and missed over two months before returning to play with Everett in August. Farmelo played a total of 29 games in 2025 and hit .230 with six home runs and 16 RBIs. After the season, he played in the Arizona Fall League with the Peoria Javelinas. Farmelo returned to Everett to open the 2026 season. Between Everett and Arkansas, he .batted ,251/.375/.436 with 17 home runs and 41 stolen bases in 56 attempts.

- Career statistics from MLB · ESPN · Fangraphs · Baseball Reference (Minors)

=== L.P. Langevin ===
L.P. Langevin

Seattle Mariners
- Pitcher
- Born: July 4, 2003 (age 23); Quebec City, Quebec, Canada
- Bats: Left Throws: Right

Loius-Philippe Langevin is a Canadian professional baseball pitcher in the Seattle Mariners organization.

On November 18 2026, the Royals traded Langevin, Maikel García and James McArthur to the Seattle Mariners in exchange for Bryce Miller, Logan Evans and José A. Ferrer.

- Career statistics from Baseball Reference (Minors)

=== Teddy McGraw ===
Teddy McGraw

Seattle Mariners
- Pitcher
- Born: October 31, 2001 (age 25); Cooperstown, New York, U.S.
- Bats: Right Throws: Right

Edward Thomas McGraw (born October 31, 2001) is an American professional baseball pitcher in the Seattle Mariners organization.

McGraw attended Oneonta High School in Oneonta, New York and played college baseball at Wake Forest University. In 2021 and 2022, he played collegiate summer baseball with the Brewster Whitecaps of the Cape Cod Baseball League. He underwent Tommy John surgery prior to his junior year in 2023 and missed the season. Despite the injury he was selected by the Seattle Mariners in the third round of the 2023 Major League Baseball draft.

McGraw made his professional debut in 2024 with the Modesto Nuts, but pitched in only four games due to another arm injury. He again missed the start of the 2025 season, and returned to pitch for the Arizona Complex League Mariners and Everett AquaSox. McGraw was converted into a relief pitcher prior to the 2026 season.

- Career statistics from Baseball Reference (Minors)

=== Michael Morales ===
Michael Morales

Seattle Mariners
- Pitcher
- Born: August 13, 2002 (age 24); Enola, Pennsylvania, U.S.
- Bats: Right Throws: Right

Michael Paul Morales (born August 13, 2002) is an American professional baseball pitcher in the Seattle Mariners organization.

Morales attended East Pennsboro High School in East Pennsboro Township, Pennsylvania. He was selected by the Seattle Mariners in the third round of the 2021 Major League Baseball draft. He signed with the Mariners with an overslot $1.5 million signing bonus.

Morales made his professional debut in 2021 with the Arizona Complex League Mariners. He pitched for the Modesto Nuts in 2022 and 2023. In 2022, he led the Nuts with 125 strikeouts in 120 1/3 innings, but had a 5–7 record and 5.91 ERA. He started 2024 with the Everett Aquasox before being promoted to the Arkansas Travelers at the beginning of July. Despite the higher competition, he had his best season in the minors, with a 13–2 record and 3.26 ERA in 149 innings.

In 2025 with Arkansas he was 4-7 with a 4.60 ERA in 22 starts. In 2026 with Arkansas he was 2-4 with a 6.11 ERA in 17 starts.

- Career statistics from Baseball Reference (Minors)

=== Robinson Ortiz ===
Robinson Ortiz

Seattle Mariners – No. 49
- Pitcher
- Born: January 4, 2000 (age 26); Peravia, Dominican Republic
- Bats: Left Throws: Left

Robinson Stiward Ortiz (born January 4, 2000) is a Dominican professional baseball pitcher for the Seattle Mariners of Major League Baseball (MLB). He is currently a phantom ballplayer, having spent two days on Seattle's active roster without making an appearance.

Ortiz was signed by the Los Angeles Dodgers as an international free agent on June 2, 2017. He was subsequently assigned to their Dominican Summer League affiliate. Ortiz was promoted to the Arizona League Dodgers in 2018 and the Great Lakes Loons in 2019. After not playing in 2020 due to the cancellation of the minor league season as a result of the COVID-19 pandemic, he returned to Great Lakes in 2021. He missed all of the 2022 and 2023 seasons due to injury and returned for only six games in 2024 for the Low-A Rancho Cucamonga Quakes. He began 2025 with Great Lakes but was promoted during the season, first to the Double–A Tulsa Drillers on June 17 and then to the Triple–A Oklahoma City Comets on August 12. Between the three levels, he was 5–2 with a 2.73 ERA in 48 games.

The Dodgers selected Ortiz's contract to their 40-man roster on November 6, 2025, in order to prevent him from reaching minor league free agency. On November 16, the Dodgers traded Ortiz to the Seattle Mariners in exchange for pitcher Tyler Gough.

Ortiz was optioned to the Triple-A Tacoma Rainiers to begin the 2026 season. In 15 appearances for Tacoma at the beginning of the season, he recorded a 1.69 ERA with 18 strikeouts over 16 innings of work. On May 18, 2026, Ortiz was promoted to the major leagues for the first time. He went unused out of the bullpen and was optioned back to Tacoma on May 20, becoming a phantom ballplayer. He ended the 2026 season with Tacoma with a record of 1-3 and a 5.69 ERA as he struggled with control, walking 31 batters in 49 innings.

- Career statistics from Baseball Reference (Minors)

=== Mason Peters ===
Mason Peters

Seattle Mariners
- Pitcher
- Born: December 18, 2003 (age 22); Waco, Texas, U.S.
- Bats: Left Throws: Left

Mason Ward Peters (born December 18, 2003) is an American professional baseball pitcher in the Seattle Mariners organization.

Peters attended Live Oak Classical School in his hometown of Waco, Texas and played college baseball at Temple College and later transferred to Dallas Baptist University. In 2025, he played collegiate summer baseball with the Chatham Anglers of the Cape Cod Baseball League. He was selected by the Seattle Mariners in the fourth round of the 2025 Major League Baseball draft and signed for $550,000.

Peters made his professional debut in 2026 with the Inland Empire 66ers.

- Career statistics from Baseball Reference (Minors)
- Temple College bio
- Dallas Baptist bio

=== Nick Raposo ===
Nick Raposo

Seattle Mariners
- Catcher
- Born: June 3, 1998 (age 28); Providence, Rhode Island, U.S.
- Bats: Right Throws: Right

Nicholas Louis Raposo (born June 3, 1998) is an American professional baseball catcher in the Seattle Mariners organization. He is currently a phantom ballplayer, having spent two days on the St. Louis Cardinals' active roster without making an appearance.

On June 15, 2020, Raposo signed a minor league contract with the St. Louis Cardinals after he was not selected in the shortened 2020 Major League Baseball draft.

Raposo made his professional debut in 2021 with the Double-A Springfield Cardinals, hitting .267/.368/.362 with one home run and 12 RBI across 42 games. He returned to Springfield the following season, playing in 59 games and batting .270/.345/.461 with seven home runs and 34 RBI. Raposo split the 2023 campaign between Springfield and the Triple-A Memphis Redbirds. In 40 games between the two teans, he accumulated a .241/.321/.386 batting line with four home runs and 13 RBI. Raposo began the 2024 season with Memphis, hitting .187/.241/.323 with five home runs and 22 RBI in 47 games prior to his call–up.

On June 22, 2024, Raposo was selected to the 40-man roster and promoted to the major leagues for the first time following an injury to Iván Herrera. He did not make an appearance for St. Louis and was optioned down to Memphis on June 24. Raposo was designated for assignment by the Cardinals on July 29.

On August 1, 2024, Raposo was claimed off waivers by the Toronto Blue Jays. In 20 games for the Triple-A Buffalo Bisons, he slashed .246/.361/.312 with one home run and five RBI. Raposo was designated for assignment following the signing of Yimi García on December 13.

On December 19, 2024, Raposo was claimed off waivers by the Seattle Mariners. On January 14, 2025, Raposo was designated for assignment by the Mariners. He cleared waivers and was sent outright to the Triple-A Tacoma Rainiers on January 17.

In 2025 with the Arkansas Travelers he batted .250/.339/.339 in 292 at bats. In 2026 with Arkansas and Tacoma he batted .253/.362/.402 in 281 at bats.

- Career statistics from Baseball Reference (Minors)

=== Boston Smith ===
Boston Smith

Seattle Mariners
- Catcher
- Born: November 28, 2002 (age 23); Dayton, Ohio, U.S.
- Bats: Right Throws: Right

Noah Boston Smith (born November 28, 2002) is an American professional baseball catcher in the Seattle Mariners organization.

Smith attended Butler High School in Vandalia, Ohio. He played college baseball at the University of Cincinnati for one year and Wright State University for three years. He was selected by the Washington Nationals in the sixth round of the 2025 Major League Baseball draft.

On March 28, 2026 the Nationals traded Smith to the Chicago White Sox in exchange for Curtis Mead. He made his professional debut that year with the Kannapolis Cannon Ballers and was promoted to the Winston-Salem Dash and Birmingham Barons during the season.

On August 1, the White Sox traded Smith, along with Seranthony Dominguez and Nolan Jones to the Seattle Mariners in exchange for Luis Castillo.

- Career statistics from Baseball Reference (Minors)

=== Jackson Steensma ===
Jackson Steensma

Seattle Mariners
- Pitcher
- Born: March 12, 2004 (age 22); Grand Rapids, Michigan, U.S.
- Bats: Right Throws: Right

Jackson Joseph Steensma (born March 12, 2004) is an American professional baseball pitcher in the Seattle Mariners organization.

Steensma attended Byron Center High School in Byron Center, Michigan and played college baseball at Appalachian State University. He missed the 2025 season after undergoing Tommy John Surgery. Despite the injury, he was selected by the Seattle Mariners in the ninth round of the 2025 Major League Baseball draft.

Steensma made his professional debut in 2026 with the Inland Empire 66ers. He was 0-6, with a 4.57 ERA.

- Career statistics from Baseball Reference (Minors)

=== Jared Sundstrom ===
Jared Sundstrom

Seattle Mariners
- Outfielder
- Born: June 21, 2001 (age 25); Santa Rosa, California, U.S.
- Bats: Right Throws: Right

Jared Sundstrom (born June 21, 2001) is an American professional baseball outfielder in the Seattle Mariners organization.

Sundstrom attended Point Arena High School in Point Arena, California and played college baseball at Santa Rosa Junior College and UC Santa Barbara. As a junior at UC Santa Barbara in 2023, he played in fifty games and batted .322 with 15 home runs and 43 RBIs and was named to the All-Big West Conference First Team. After the season, he was selected by the Seattle Mariners in the tenth round of the 2023 Major League Baseball draft. Sundstrom signed with the team for $165,500.

Sundstrom made his professional debut after signing with the Arizona Complex League Mariners and also played with the Modesto Nuts, batting .240 with three home runs over 22 games between both teams. He played the 2024 season with the Everett AquaSox and hit .263 with 13 home runs, 63 RBIs, and 26 stolen bases over 114 games. Following the season's end, he was selected to play in the Arizona Fall League with the Peoria Javelinas. Sundstrom was assigned to the Arkansas Travelers for the 2025 season. Over 115 games, he had a .219/.297/.374 slash line with 12 home runs, 53 RBI, and 35 stolen bases while being caught four times. Sundstrom returned to Arkansas for the 2026 season and hit .207/.288/.387 with 13 home runs and 45 RBI over 89 games.

== Full Triple-A to Rookie League rosters ==
=== Triple-A ===
Tacoma Rainiers roster
Players		Coaches/Other
Pitchers: 58 Peyton Alford; 20 Charlie Beilenson; -- Bryce Conley; 63 Austin Kitchen; -- Johnathan Lavallee; 33 Seth Shuman; 10 Reid VanScoter	Catchers: 9 Jake Harvey; 36 Nick Raposo; Infielders: -- Josh Hood; Outfielders: 4 Victor Labrada; 9 Spencer Packard	Manager: 7 John Russell; Coaches: 17 Mike McCarthy (pitching); 5 Eric Farris (bench); 60 Seth Mejias-Brean (hitting); 28 Jacob Nottingham (coach); 7-day injured list; * On Seattle Mariners 40-man roster; ~ Development list; # Rehab assignment; ∞ Reserve list; ‡ Restricted list; § Suspended list; † Temporarily inactive list; Roster updated November 18, 2026; Transactions; → More rosters: MiLB • Pacific Coast League; → Seattle Mariners minor league players

=== Double-A ===
Arkansas Travelers roster
Players		Coaches/Other
Pitchers: 14 Ferny Barreda; 13 Tyler Cleveland; 41 Ty Cummings; 22 Ryan Hawks; 38 Michael Hobbs; 16 Jimmy Joyce; 39 Lucas Kelly; 30 Jimmy Kingsbury; 28 Teddy McGraw; 14 Michael Morales; 21 Marcelo Perez; 43 Jason Ruffcorn; 26 Ryan Sloan; 19 Adam Smith; 29 Nico Tellache; 27 Sam Whiting	Catchers: 15 Josh Caron; 7 Connor Charping; 40 Boston Smith; Infielders: 9 Caleb Cali; 4 Felnin Celesten; 38 Carter Dorighi; 23 Hunter Fitz-Gerald; 5 Charlie Pagliarini; 16 Austin St. Laurent; Outfielders: 31 Anthony Donofrio; 8 Jonny Farmelo; 3 Bill Knight; 20 Jared Sundstrom	Manager: 25 Rich Thompson; Coaches: 10 Jordan Cowan (hitting); 18 Cameron Ming (pitching); 36 Jose Umbria (bench); 7-day injured list; * On Seattle Mariners 40-man roster; ~ Development list; # Rehab assignment; ∞ Reserve list; ‡ Restricted list; § Suspended list; † Temporarily inactive list; Roster updated November 2, 2026; Transactions; → More rosters: MiLB • Texas League; → Seattle Mariners minor league players

=== High-A ===
Everett AquaSox roster
Players		Coaches/Other
Pitchers: 27 Chase Centala; -- Elijah Dale; 48 Jacob Denner; 22 Reid Easterly; 36 Walter Ford; 23 Jose Geraldo; 19 Casey Hintz; -- L.P. Langevin; 9 Christian Little; 46 Wyatt Lunsford-Shenkman; 18 Adam Maier; 6 Mason Peters; 25 Calvin Schapira; 28 Colton Shaw; 31 Evan Truitt; 39 Jack White	Catchers: 33 Sebastian De Andrade; 30 Matthew Ellis; 32 Luke Stevenson; Infielders: 1 Ricardo Cova; 4 Brandon Eike; 13 Henry Kaczmar; Outfielders: 5 Brayden Corn; 5 Korbyn Dickerson; 14 Carlos Jimenez; 15 Aidan Taurek; 1 Curtis Washington Jr. *	Manager: 12 Ryan Scott; Coaches: 7 Chase Miller (hitting); 20 Logan Moore (bench); 6 Bryan Pall (pitching); 17 Edgardo Rivera (coach); 7-day injured list; * On Seattle Mariners 40-man roster; ~ Development list; # Rehab assignment; ∞ Reserve list; ‡ Restricted list; § Suspended list; † Temporarily inactive list; Roster updated November 18, 2026; Transactions; → More rosters: MiLB • Northwest League; → Seattle Mariners minor league players

=== Single-A ===
Inland Empire 66ers roster
Players		Coaches/Other
Pitchers: -- Gage Boehm; 14 Jack Bowery; 10 Aiden Butler; 20 Ray Cebulski; 29 Chris Diaz; 38 Gleiner Diaz; 21 German Fajardo; 34 Anderson Guevara; 28 Sean Hermann; 22 Thomas Higgins; 44 Anthony Karoly; 19 Aneury Lora; 23 Reese Lumpkin; 27 Danny Macchiarola; -- Anyelo Ovando; 47 Wyatt Queen; 36 Adrian Quintana; -- Will Riley; 6 Jose Romero; 48 Scott Rouse; 27 Chia-shi Shen; 33 Jackson Steensma; 15 Matt Tiberia; 39 Jose Gabriel Torres; 27 Connor Wilford; 30 Dylan Wilson; 34 Jose Zerpa	Catchers: 16 Connor Dykstra; 48 Mason Eckelman; 18 Jacob Galloway; 7 Grant Jay; Infielders: 31 Starlin Aguilar; 9 Nick Becker; 11 Henry Ford; 34 Eric Jeon; 43 Estevan Moreno; 21 Ace Reese; 1 Dervy Ventura; 2 Ryan Wynn; Outfielders: 7 Kelvin Alcantara; 3 Yorger Bautista; 17 Jake Brown; 36 Hayden Yost	Manager: 5 Luis Caballero; Coaches: 13 Josh Morgan (bench); 12 Sam Delaplane (pitching); 8 Nick Ward (hitting); 7-day injured list; * On Seattle Mariners 40-man roster; ~ Development list; # Rehab assignment; ∞ Reserve list; ‡ Restricted list; § Suspended list; † Temporarily inactive list; Roster updated November 2, 2026; Transactions; → More rosters: MiLB • California League; → Seattle Mariners minor league players

=== Rookie ===
Arizona Complex League Mariners roster
Players		Coaches/Other
Pitchers: 54 Cristian Aray; 46 Gregori Arrieche; 91 Alan Carpinteiro; 96 Juan Cazarez; 28 Angel Chicuate; -- Griffin Hugus; -- Juan Jiminez; 21 Po-Chun Lin; -- Ryan Loutos; -- Connor Marshburn; -- Matthew Matthijs; 13 Kendal Meza; -- Ruddy Navarro; 16 Francisco Pazos; 17 Roberto Perez; -- Juan Pinto; 18 Ruben Ramirez; 28 Maximo Rodriguez; 36 Wuilliams Rodriguez; -- Nathan Taylor; -- Isaac Thornton; -- Chris Torres; -- Anthony Treto; 15 Eduardo Uscanga; -- Drew Whalen	Catchers: 29 Manuel Almeida; 33 Eduardo Ponce; Infielders: 8 Diego Contreras; 2 Joshua Francis; -- Martin Gonzalez; -- Trevor Lucas; 7 Leandro Romero; Outfielders: -- Kyle Boylston; 11 Konni Durschlag; -- Michael Petite; -- Charlie Sutherland	Manager: -- Hecmart Nieves; Coaches: -- George Bell (hitting); -- Tanner Gordon (pitching); -- Sergio Plasencia (coach); -- Chase Wullenweber (bench); 7-day injured list; * On Seattle Mariners 40-man roster; ~ Development list; # Rehab assignment; ∞ Reserve list; ‡ Restricted list; § Suspended list; † Temporarily inactive list; Roster updated November 3, 2026; Transactions; → More rosters: MiLB • Arizona Complex League; → Seattle Mariners minor league players

=== Foreign Rookie ===
Dominican Summer League Mariners roster
Players		Coaches/Other
Pitchers: 23 Henry Alcantara; 54 Cristian Alvarado; 32 German Arvayo; 36 Gabriel Hidalgo; 29 Wisler Infante; 18 Anderson Jimenez; 35 Erick Lanza; 30 Carlos Martinez; 37 Danery Meyer; 33 Randal Munoz; 9 Osvaldo Platas; 15 Ismanuel Piña; 34 Kevin Pino; 8 Jesus Rondon; -- Similien Senatus; 10 Adalberto Vallenilla; 28 Adan Vallenilla; 25 Mario Vasquez	Catchers: 4 Daniel Alana; 27 Manuel Baez; 30 Cesar Farias; 41 Gabriel Guanchez; 12 Santiago Pereira; Infielders: 7 Magz German; 1 Fabian Gonzalez; 13 Dawel Joseph; 5 Kendry Martinez; 17 Leonardo Reynoso; Outfielders: 6 Jarvis Gomez; 19 Elias Perez; 2 Gregory Pio; 22 Ambeiro Recio; 3 Juan Rijo; 16 Maikol Rodriguez; 44 Edgardo Toro	Manager: -- Luis Matias; Coaches: -- Jose Amancio (pitching); -- Robert Emery (bench); -- Jesus Galindo (outfield/base running); -- Angus Stayte (hitting); 7-day injured list; * On Seattle Mariners 40-man roster; ~ Development list; # Rehab assignment; ∞ Reserve list; ‡ Restricted list; § Suspended list; † Temporarily inactive list; Roster updated November 2, 2026; Transactions; → More rosters: MiLB • Dominican Summer League; → Seattle Mariners minor league players
