= List of Vancouver Canadians seasons =

Baseball team season list

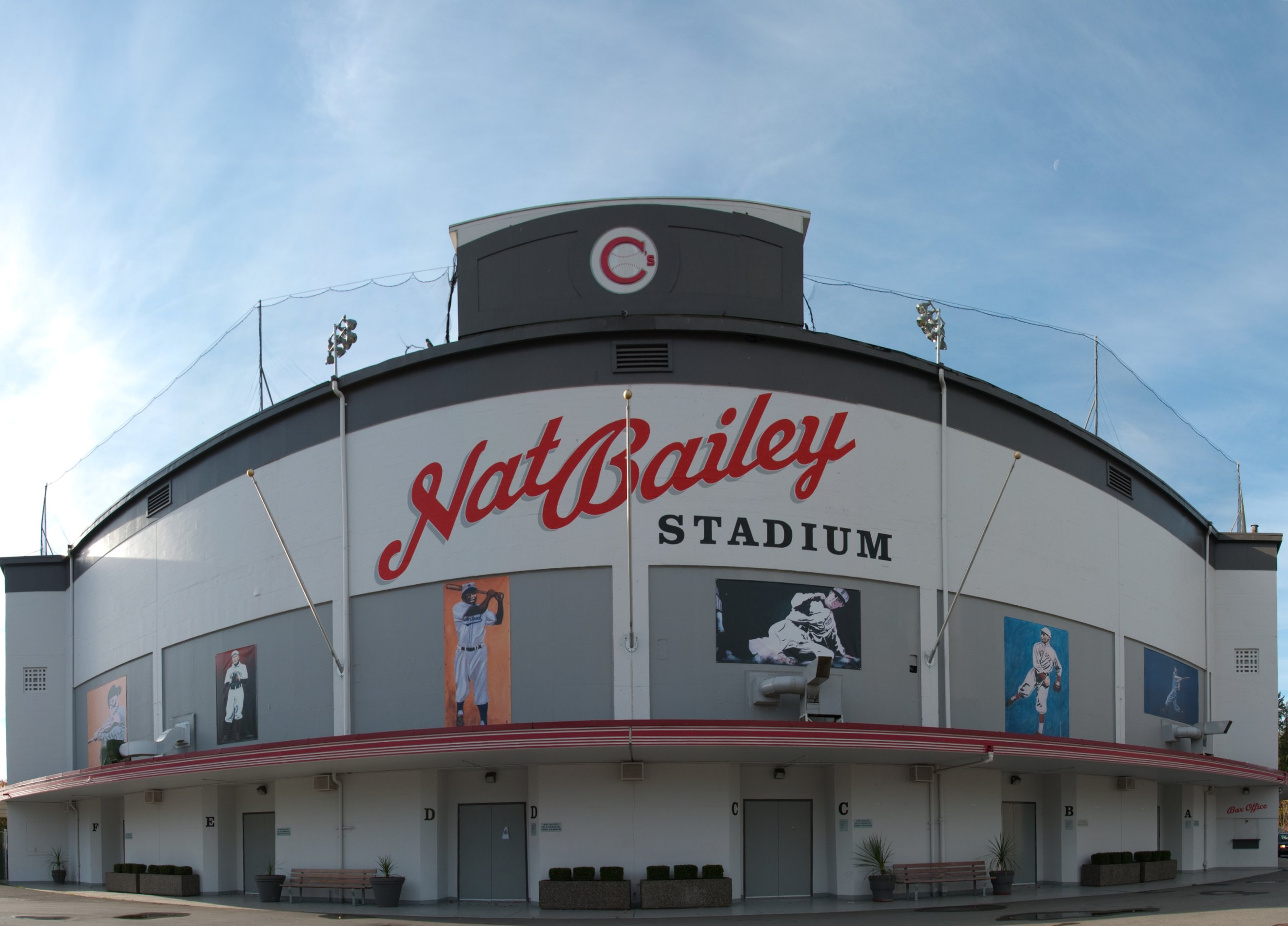
The Vancouver Canadians have played at Nat Bailey Stadium since their founding in 2000.

The Vancouver Canadians are a Minor League Baseball team based in Vancouver, British Columbia, that plays in the Northwest League (NWL). The team was founded after the original Vancouver Canadians relocated to Sacramento, California, days after winning the Triple-A World Series in 1999, and the Southern Oregon Timberjacks relocated to Vancouver, assuming the Canadians identity, for the 2000 Northwest League season. The Canadians were affiliated with the Oakland Athletics from 2000 to 2010, but have been affiliated with the Toronto Blue Jays since 2011. In conjunction with the 2021 restructuring of the minor leagues, the Canadians were upgraded from the Short-Season A class to the High-A class and were placed in the new High-A West (A+W) in 2021. This league was renamed the Northwest League in 2022.

The team has played 2,289 regular-season games and compiled a win–loss record of 1,176–1,113, resulting in a winning percentage of .514. The Canadians' best regular-season record occurred three times; in 2005, 2012 and 2014 with a record of 46–30 (.605). Conversely, their worst record was 29–45 (.392), which they recorded in 2016. The Canadians have won six Northwest League championships (2011, 2012, 2013, 2017, 2023, and 2026). (Note: Cited by multiple references:) They have also claimed seven division titles, (Note: Before 2010, divisions were won by the team that got first in the division. From 2010 to 2019, division championships were decided in a best-of-three series between the division winners of each half of the league's split-season. Divisions were eliminated in the league's 2021 restructuring.) including four consecutive division championships from 2011 to 2014. The team also has won two first-half titles, (Note: The NWL uses a split-season schedule wherein the division winners from each half qualify for the postseason championship playoffs.) and six second-half titles.

== Season-by-season records ==
Key
| League | The team's final position in the league standings |
| Division | The team's final position in the divisional standings |
| GB | Games behind the team that finished in first place in the division that season |
| Apps. | Postseason appearances: number of seasons the team qualified for the postseason |
| Win % | The team's winning percentage |
| † | League champions (2000–present) |
| * | Division champions (2000–2019) |
| ^ | Postseason berth (2000–present) |

Season-by-season records
| Season | League | Regular-season | | | | | Postseason | | | MLB affiliate | Ref. |
| Season | League | Record | Win % | League | Division | GB | Record | Win % | Result | MLB affiliate | Ref. |
|---|---|---|---|---|---|---|---|---|---|---|---|
| 2000 | NWL | 39–37 | .513 | 3rd | 2nd | 1 | — | — | — | Oakland Athletics | |
| 2001 | NWL | 37–39 | .487 | 4th | 2nd | 14 | — | — | — | Oakland Athletics | |
| 2002 | NWL | 37–39 | .487 | 6th | 4th | 7 | — | — | — | Oakland Athletics | |
| 2003 | NWL | 35–41 | .461 | 5th | 3rd | 8 | — | — | — | Oakland Athletics | |
| 2004^ * | NWL | 42–34 | .553 | 1st (tie) | 1st | — | 0–3 | .000 | Won West Division title Lost NWL championship vs. Boise Hawks, 3–0 | Oakland Athletics | |
| 2005^ * | NWL | 46–30 | .605 | 1st | 1st | — | 2–3 | .400 | Won West Division title Lost NWL championship vs. Spokane Indians, 3–2 | Oakland Athletics | |
| 2006 | NWL | 39–37 | .513 | 4th | 3rd | 16 | — | — | — | Oakland Athletics | |
| 2007 | NWL | 37–38 | .493 | 2nd | 2nd | 19 1/2 | — | — | — | Oakland Athletics | |
| 2008 | NWL | 34–42 | .447 | 6th | 3rd | 6 | — | — | — | Oakland Athletics | |
| 2009 | NWL | 36–40 | .474 | 5th | 3rd | 13 | — | — | — | Oakland Athletics | |
| 2010^ | NWL | 42–34 | .553 | 4th | 2nd | — | 0–2 | .000 | Won Second-Half West Division title Lost West Division title vs. Everett AquaSox, 2–0 | Oakland Athletics | |
| 2011^ * † | NWL | 39–37 | .513 | 3rd | 2nd | 7 | 4–2 | .667 | Won Wild-Card berth Won West Division title vs. Eugene Emeralds, 2–1; Won NWL championship vs. Tri-City Dust Devils, 2–1 | Toronto Blue Jays | |
| 2012^ * † | NWL | 46–30 | .605 | 2nd (tie) | 2nd (tie) | 1 | 4–1 | .800 | Won Second-Half West Division title Won West Division title vs. Everett AquaSox, 2–0; Won NWL championship vs. Boise Hawks, 2–1 | Toronto Blue Jays | |
| 2013^ * † | NWL | 39–37 | .513 | 4th | 2nd | 5 | 4–1 | .800 | Won Second-Half North Division title Won North Division title vs Everett AquaSox, 2–0; Won NWL championship vs. Boise Hawks, 2–1 | Toronto Blue Jays | |
| 2014^ * | NWL | 46–30 | .605 | 2nd | 1st | — | 2–2 | .500 | Won Second-Half North Division title Won North Division title vs. Spokane Indians, 2–0; Lost NWL championship vs. Hillsboro Hops, 2–0 | Toronto Blue Jays | |
| 2015 | NWL | 34–42 | .447 | 6th (tie) | 3rd (tie) | 8 | — | — | — | Toronto Blue Jays | |
| 2016 | NWL | 29–45 | .392 | 8th | 4th | 15 | — | — | — | Toronto Blue Jays | |
| 2017^ * † | NWL | 43–33 | .566 | 1st | 1st | — | 5–1 | .833 | Won First-Half North Division title Won North Division title vs. Spokane Indians, 2–0; Won NWL championship vs. Eugene Emeralds, 3–1 | Toronto Blue Jays | |
| 2018 | NWL | 40–36 | .526 | 2nd | 1st | — | — | — | — | Toronto Blue Jays | |
| 2019 | NWL | 30–46 | .395 | 7th | 4th | 15 | — | — | — | Toronto Blue Jays | |
| 2020 | NWL | Season cancelled (COVID-19 pandemic) | | | | | | | | Toronto Blue Jays | |
| 2021 | A+W | 55–64 | .462 | 5th | — | 14 | — | — | — | Toronto Blue Jays | |
| 2022^ | NWL | 67–62 | .519 | 2nd | — | 14 | 0–3 | .000 | Won Second-Half title Lost NWL championship vs. Eugene Emeralds, 3–0 | Toronto Blue Jays | |
| 2023^ † | NWL | 77–54 | .588 | 1st | — | — | 3–1 | .750 | Won First-Half title Won NWL championship vs. Everett AquaSox, 3–1 | Toronto Blue Jays | |
| 2024^ | NWL | 68–61 | .527 | 2nd | — | 10 1/2 | 1–3 | .250 | Won Second-Half title Lost NWL championship vs. Spokane Indians, 3–1 | Toronto Blue Jays | |
| 2025 | NWL | 75–57 | .586 | 2nd | — | 6 | — | — | — | Toronto Blue Jays | |
| 2026^ † | NWL | 64–68 | .485 | 3rd (tie) | — | 15 1/2 | 3–0 | 1.000 | Won Wild-Card berth Won NWL championship vs. Eugene Emeralds, 3–0 | Toronto Blue Jays | |
| Totals | — | 1176–1113 | .514 | — | — | — | 28–22 | .560 | — | — | — |

== Franchise totals ==
=== By classification ===
Franchise totals by classification
| Classification | Regular-season | | Postseason | | | Composite | |
| Classification | Record | Win % | Apps. | Record | Win % | Record | Win % |
|---|---|---|---|---|---|---|---|
| Short-Season A (2000–2020) | 770–747 | .508 | 8 | 21–15 | .583 | 791–762 | .509 |
| High-A (2021–2026) | 406–366 | .526 | 4 | 7–7 | .500 | 413–373 | .525 |
| All-time | 1,176–1,113 | .514 | 12 | 28–22 | .560 | 1,204–1,135 | .515 |

=== By affiliation ===
Franchise totals by affiliation
| Affiliation | Regular-season | | Postseason | | | Composite | |
| Affiliation | Record | Win % | Apps. | Record | Win % | Record | Win % |
|---|---|---|---|---|---|---|---|
| Oakland Athletics (2000–2010) | 424–411 | .508 | 3 | 2–8 | .200 | 426–419 | .504 |
| Toronto Blue Jays (2011–2026) | 752–702 | .517 | 9 | 26–14 | .520 | 778–716 | .521 |
| All-time | 1,176–1,113 | .514 | 12 | 28–22 | .560 | 1,204–1,135 | .515 |
