= Everett AquaSox =

Minor league baseball team

- Founded in 1995; Everett, Washington

Team logo	Cap insignia

Minor league affiliations
- Class: High-A (2021–present)
- Previous classes: Class A Short Season (1995–2020)
- League: Northwest League (1995–present)

Major league affiliations
- Team: Seattle Mariners (1995–present)

Minor league titles
- League titles (2): 2010; 2025
- Division titles (3): 2002; 2010; 2016
- First-half titles (1): 2025
- Second-half titles (1): 2023

Team data
- Colors: Navy, aqua, light green, orange, white
- Mascot: Webbly
- Ballpark: Funko Field (1995–present)
- Owner/ Operator: 7th Inning Stretch LLC
- General manager: Danny Tetzlaff
- Manager: Ryan Scott
- Website: milb.com/everett

The Everett AquaSox are a Minor League Baseball team in Everett, Washington. The team is a member of the Northwest League and is the High-A affiliate of the Seattle Mariners. The AquaSox play their home games at Funko Field, which has a seating capacity of 3,682. The team were founded in 1995 as the successor of the Everett Giants, who were affiliated with the San Francisco Giants. Everett has won three division titles and two Northwest League championships.

== History ==
Following the 1983 season, Bob and Margaret Bavasi purchased the struggling Walla Walla, Washington, based Blue Mountain Bears. Antiquated facilities compounded by dwindling attendance in Walla Walla prompted the new owners to move the franchise. The Bavasis, who had secured affiliation with the San Francisco Giants, ultimately selected Everett as the relocation destination. Playing as the Everett Giants, the club was affiliated with San Francisco for 11 years until 1994.

On September 12, 1994, Everett signed a player development contract with the Seattle Mariners as their Class A Short Season affiliate to replace San Francisco. They adopted their current name, the AquaSox, in November 1994. The team were sold to 7th Inning Stretch LLC, a California-based group with ownership stakes in several minor league teams, in November 2008.

Since 2021, the team has played at the High-A classification as a Mariners affiliate, initially in the High-A West. In March 2022, the High-A West was rebranded back to the Northwest League, as MLB moved to revert all of its Minor Leagues to their historical names.

== Stadium ==
Due to the Northwest League's reclassification in 2021 as a High-A league, which included an expanded schedule and new venue requirements, the AquaSox began exploring a replacement for Funko Field. In September 2022, the City of Everett and Snohomish County approved funds to study a new stadium, which is estimated to cost $80 million and seat 3,500 spectators. A site adjacent to Angel of the Winds Arena in downtown Everett was selected for the study; other proposed sites included the Everett Mall, Kasch Park, and a city-owned lot near Interstate 5.

On December 18, 2024, the Everett City Council voted to select the downtown Everett site for a new baseball stadium that meets the updated MLB standards and could host a United Soccer League team. The site is between Pacific and Hewitt avenues on the east side of Broadway. The stadium is estimated to cost a minimum of $102 million, of which the AquaSox would pay $10 million. The study identified up to $95 million in public funding sources, including state grants and municipal bonds. The stadium's design is scheduled to be completed in 2025 or 2026, with plans to open in time for the 2027 Northwest League season. The estimated cost of the stadium rose to $120 million by the end of January 2026, though the city had not yet given its final approval for the project. The proposed financial plan for the stadium includes $92 million from the city government, to be raised through debt; $7 million from the state government, $10 million from the county government, $10 million from the AquaSox, and $7 million from the United Soccer League.

== Identity ==
The AquaSox name was announced in November 1994 after the team had signed an affiliation agreement with the Mariners. They had declined to use the Mariners to create an independent identity. The AquaSox combined imagery of local waterways inhabited by frogs as well as the traditional baseball name "Sox" used by several professional franchises. One of the team logos, used on road caps and jerseys, is based on the trident logo used by the Mariners from 1981 to 1986, rotated to look like the letter "E" for Everett, instead of "M" for Mariners. This logo was introduced in 2010 alongside a secondary logo with two socks. AquaSox is also a term used to describe Water Socks, a type of flexible Water Shoe.

The team's primary mascot is Webbly, a frog. According to team radio broadcaster Pat Dillon, "The frog is a cross between a Pacific tree frog and a Central American red-eyed tree frog—and Brooks Robinson." Secondary mascots include a giant hot dog named Frank N. Furter, who had been a mascot for the Everett Giants, and Pop Fly, a puppet in a moving puppet house.

== Season-by-season record ==
=== Northwest League (1995–present) ===
Season	PDC	Division (Note: Since 2021, High-A West and the Northwest League have not used divisions.)	Finish	Wins	Losses	Win%	Postseason (Note: Starting in 2022, the Northwest League championship is played between the teams with the best regular season records in each half of the season with no earlier playoff rounds.)	Manager	Attendance
Everett AquaSox
1995	SEA	North	2nd	37	39	.487		Orlando Gómez	89,950
1996	SEA	North	4th	33	42	.440		Roger Hansen	87,846
1997	SEA	North	3rd	29	47	.382		Orlando Gómez	79,918
1998	SEA	North	3rd	34	42	.447		Terry Pollreisz	119,396
1999	SEA	North	3rd	41	35	.540		Terry Pollreisz	103,455
2000	SEA	East	4th	37	39	.487		Terry Pollreisz	114,024
2001	SEA	West	3rd	36	39	.480		Terry Pollreisz	114,727
2002	SEA	West	1st	44	32	.579	Lost to Boise in championship series 0–3	Roger Hansen	110,373
2003	SEA	West	4th	32	44	.421		Pedro Grifol	110,043
2004	SEA	West	2nd	41	35	.539		Pedro Grifol	104,010
2005	SEA	West	3rd	42	34	.553		Pedro Grifol	108,884
2006	SEA	West	4th	31	45	.408		Dave Myers	106,675
2007	SEA	West	3rd	35	41	.461		Mike Tosar	106,683
2008	SEA	West	4th	32	44	.421		Jose Moreno	95,294
2009	SEA	West	2nd	39	37	.513		John Tamargo	89,929
2010	SEA	West	1st	48	27	.640	Defeated Vancouver in division series 2–1; Defeated Spokane in championship series 2–1	Jose Moreno	89,929
2011	SEA	West	3rd	37	39	.487		Scott Steinmann	96,345
2012	SEA	West	3rd	46	30	.605	Lost to Vancouver in division series 0–2	Rob Mummau	95,929
2013	SEA	North	1st	44	32	.579	Lost to Vancouver in division series 0–2	Rob Mammau	92,489
2014	SEA	North	4th	28	48	.368		Dave Valle	92,642
2015	SEA	North	1st	42	34	.553	Lost to Tri-City in division series 0–2	Rob Mammau	100,613
2016	SEA	North	1st	45	31	.592	Defeated Spokane in division series 2–0; Lost to Eugene in championship series 1–2	Rob Mammau	104,162
2017	SEA	North	4th	36	40	.474		Jose Moreno	110,161
2018	SEA	North	2nd	38	38	.500	Lost to Spokane in division series 1–2	Jose Moreno	111,599
2019	SEA	North	3rd	37	39	.487		Louis Boyd	116,630
2020	SEA	Season canceled due to COVID-19 pandemic							
2021	SEA	—	3rd	61	56	.521		Louis Boyd	102,423
2022	SEA	—	5th	59	72	.450		Eric Farris	128,836
2023	SEA	—	2nd	74	58	.561	Lost to Vancouver in championship series 1–3	Ryan Scott	140,937
2024	SEA	—	4th	64	68	.485		Ryan Scott	135,695
2025	SEA	—	5th	60	72	.455	Defeated Eugene in championship series 3–1	Zach Vincej	147,051
2026	SEA	—	2nd	67	65	.508		Ryan Scott	141,219

Division winner	League champions

== Roster ==
Everett AquaSox roster
Players		Coaches/Other
Pitchers: 27 Chase Centala; -- Elijah Dale; 48 Jacob Denner; 22 Reid Easterly; 36 Walter Ford; 23 Jose Geraldo; 19 Casey Hintz; 9 Christian Little; 46 Wyatt Lunsford-Shenkman; 18 Adam Maier; 6 Mason Peters; 25 Calvin Schapira; 28 Colton Shaw; 31 Evan Truitt; 39 Jack White	Catchers: 33 Sebastian De Andrade; 30 Matthew Ellis; 32 Luke Stevenson; Infielders: 1 Ricardo Cova; 4 Brandon Eike; 13 Henry Kaczmar; Outfielders: 5 Brayden Corn; 5 Korbyn Dickerson; 14 Carlos Jimenez; 15 Aidan Taurek; 1 Curtis Washington Jr. *	Manager: 12 Ryan Scott; Coaches: 7 Chase Miller (hitting); 20 Logan Moore (bench); 6 Bryan Pall (pitching); 17 Edgardo Rivera (coach); 7-day injured list; * On Seattle Mariners 40-man roster; ~ Development list; # Rehab assignment; ∞ Reserve list; ‡ Restricted list; § Suspended list; † Temporarily inactive list; Roster updated November 2, 2026; Transactions; → More rosters: MiLB • Northwest League; → Seattle Mariners minor league players

== Retired numbers ==
The AquaSox have retired four uniform numbers, including one former AquaSox player, one long-time uniformed staff member, one player whose number was retired by the Mariners organization, and one player retired by all affiliated baseball teams. The team does not state criteria for retiring its numbers.

- Greg Halman's no. 26 was retired by the AquaSox on June 23, 2012. He played for the AquaSox in 2005 and 2006 and was named the Short-Season A Player of the Year in 2006. He was killed by his brother in November 2011, shortly after his second season in the major leagues.
- Ken Griffey Jr.'s no. 24 was retired by the Mariners in January 2016, shortly after he was inducted into the National Baseball Hall of Fame.
- Jackie Robinson's no. 42 was retired throughout MLB on April 15, 1997, the 50th anniversary of him breaking MLB's racially exclusionist color line.
- The number 35 was retired in honor of athletic trainer Marion "Spyder" Webb, who worked for the Mariners organization for 35 years, including for the AquaSox since their inception in 1995, until retiring in 2013.

== Notes ==
Preceded by Everett Giants	Northwest League franchise (1995–present)	Succeeded by
