= List of Northwest League team rosters =

Each of the six teams of Minor League Baseball's Northwest League carry a 30-man active roster. Only these players are eligible to play.

Teams may have any number of inactive players on their rosters at a given time who do not count toward active roster limits. Injured players may be placed on the injured list (7-day or 60-day). The temporary inactive list and bereavement list are for players attending to personal matters. Major league players may be placed on rosters for injury rehabilitation for a maximum of 20 days for non-pitchers and 30 days for pitchers.

Players who are ineligible to play due to failure to adhere to the Minor League Drug Prevention and Treatment Program, violations of their contract, who are receiving team disciplinary action, or who are unable to join the team due to visa problems may be placed on the restricted or suspended lists. These players count against a team's active roster limit.

Each team usually has a three-man coaching staff including a manager, hitting coach, and pitching coach. Depending on each Major League Baseball organization's development approach, some teams may have additional coaches.

== Rosters ==
=== Eugene Emeralds ===
Eugene Emeralds roster
| Players | Coaches/Other |
|---|---|
| Pitchers: 33 Jacob Bresnahan; 54 Luis De La Torre; 52 Hunter Dryden; 17 Cole Hillier; 29 Gerelmi Maldonado; 28 Yunior Marte; 47 Niko Mazza; 31 Charlie McDaniel; 41 Brayan Palencia; 45 Liam Simon; 43 Ryan Slater; 16 Austin Strickland; 14 Tyler Switalski; 48 Ryan Vanderhei; 56 Cade Vernon; 59 Esmerlin Vinicio; Catchers: 23 Onil Perez; 40 Daniel Rogers; 7 Jancel Villarroel; Infielders: 12 Zander Darby; 35 Robert Hipwell; 6 Gavin Kilen; 13 Walker Martin; -- Jose Ramos; 15 Jean Carlos Sio; Outfielders: 26 Jakob Christian; 1 Trevor Cohen; 38 Lisbel Diaz; 2 Carlos Gutierrez; 5 Dakota Jordan | Manager: 34 Jacob Heyward; Coaches: 61 Nate Keavy (fundamentals); 51 Braxton Lee (hitting); 10 Luis Pino (pitching); 60-day injured list: -- Josh Bostick; -- Matt Dunaway; -- Hayden Wynja; 7-day injured list; * On San Francisco Giants 40-man roster; ~ Development list; # Rehab assignment; ∞ Reserve list; ‡ Restricted list; § Suspended list; † Temporarily inactive list; Roster updated May 12, 2026; Transactions; → More rosters: MiLB • Northwest League; → San Francisco Giants minor league players |

=== Everett AquaSox ===
Everett AquaSox roster
| Players | Coaches/Other |
|---|---|
| Pitchers: 39 Will Armbruester; 27 Chase Centala; 48 Jacob Denner; 40 Taylor Dollard; 22 Reid Easterly; 36 Walter Ford; 23 Jose Geraldo; 16 Ben Hernandez; 19 Casey Hintz; 34 Lucas Kelly; 9 Christian Little; 46 Wyatt Lunsford-Shenkman; 18 Adam Maier; -- Teddy McGraw; 33 Brock Moore; 25 Calvin Schapira; 28 Colton Shaw; 38 Adam Smith; 11 Gabriel Sosa †; 31 Evan Truitt; 37 Sam Whiting; Catchers: 10 Josh Caron; 30 Matthew Ellis; 32 Luke Stevenson; Infielders: 5 Felnin Celesten; 29 Carter Dorighi; 4 Brandon Eike; 93 Spencer Packard #; 21 Axel Sanchez; 13 Austin St. Laurent; 8 Luis Suisbel; Outfielders: 2 Anthony Donofrio; 15 Jonny Farmelo; 14 Carlos Jiminez; 1 Curtis Washington Jr. | Manager: 12 Ryan Scott; Coaches: 7 Chase Miller (hitting); 20 Logan Moore (bench); 6 Bryan Pall (pitching); 17 Edgardo Rivera (coach); 7-day injured list; * On Seattle Mariners 40-man roster; ~ Development list; # Rehab assignment; ∞ Reserve list; ‡ Restricted list; § Suspended list; † Temporarily inactive list; Roster updated May 12, 2026; Transactions; → More rosters: MiLB • Northwest League; → Seattle Mariners minor league players |

=== Hillsboro Hops ===
Hillsboro Hops roster
| Players | Coaches/Other |
|---|---|
| Pitchers: 28 Wellington Aracena; 2 Kyle Ayers; 21 Rio Britton; 37 Dawson Brown; 4 Yordin Chalas; 17 Brian Curley; -- Patrick Forbes; 23 Joangel González; 31 Caden Grice; 11 David Hagaman; 34 Sawyer Hawks; 37 Tommy Henry * #; 14 Adonys Perez; 33 Rocco Reid; 38 Zane Russell; 22 Junior Sanchez; 16 Sandro Santana; 35 Nate Savino; -- Jacob Steinmetz; 45 John West; Catchers: 15 Alberto Barriga; 13 Kenny Castillo; 22 Adrian De Leon; Infielders: 5 Wallace Clark; 8 Brady Counsell; 9 Modeifi Marte; 19 José Mejía; 24 Yerald Nin; 12 Adrian Rodriguez; 10 Yassel Soler; Outfielders: 5 Slade Caldwell; 25 Avery Owusu-Asiedu; 1 Trent Youngblood | Manager: 7 Mark Reed; Coaches: 30 James Adduci (assistant hitting); 43 Blake Nation (pitching); 0 Gift Ngoepe (bench); 60-day injured list: 14 Luke Craig; 24 Mason Marriott; 7-day injured list; * On Arizona Diamondbacks 40-man roster; ~ Development list; # Rehab assignment; ∞ Reserve list; ‡ Restricted list; § Suspended list; † Temporarily inactive list; Roster updated May 15, 2026; Transactions; → More rosters: MiLB • Northwest League; → Arizona Diamondbacks minor league players |

=== Spokane Indians ===
Spokane Indians roster
| Players | Coaches/Other |
|---|---|
| Pitchers: 16 Nathan Blasick; 11 Brody Brecht; 24 Everett Catlett; 37 Jackson Cox; 35 Jeff Criswell * #; 18 Stu Flesland III; 12 Bryson Hammer; 25 Tyler Hampu; 45 Yujanyer Herrera; 47 Fisher Jameson; 48 Lebarron Johnson Jr.; 22 Justin Loer; 32 Hunter Mann; 31 Hunter Omlid; 36 Bryan Perez; 29 Francis Rivera; 10 Bryson Van Sickle; 30 Jordy Vargas; Catchers: 28 Juan Castillo; 19 Alan Espinal; Infielders: 20 Kevin Fitzer; 15 Ethan Hedges; 6 Roynier Hernandez; 7 Kelvin Hidalgo; 14 Jacob Hinderleider; 4 Tommy Hopfe; 2 Tevin Tucker; -- Blake Wright; Outfielders: 27 Max Belyeu; 44 Robert Calaz; 3 Caleb Hobson; 1 Jacob Humphrey | Manager: 21 Tom Sutaris; Coaches: 38 Blaine Beatty (pitching); 8 Tyler Ladendorf (performance); 9 Edgardo Lebron (bench); -- Allison Krajewski (performance); 60-day injured list: 23 Antoine Jean (full season); 29 Jake Madden; 7-day injured list; * On Colorado Rockies 40-man roster; ~ Development list; # Rehab assignment; ∞ Reserve list; ‡ Restricted list; § Suspended list; † Temporarily inactive list; Roster updated April 29, 2026; Transactions; → More rosters: MiLB • Northwest League; → Colorado Rockies minor league players |

=== Tri-City Dust Devils ===
Tri-City Dust Devils roster
| Players | Coaches/Other |
|---|---|
| Pitchers: 18 Tyler Bremner; 29 Max Gieg; 27 Nick Jones; 3 Keythel Key; 25 Lucas Knowles; 55 Alex Martinez; 46 Peyton Olejnik; 24 Dylan Phillips; 22 Zachary Redner; 20 Kyle Roche; 14 Luke Schafer; 21 Chase Shores; 16 Nate Snead; 37 Francis Texido; 26 Benny Thompson; 32 Sam Tookoian; 30 Yeferson Vargas; Catchers: 40 Caleb Bartolero; 5 Kevin Bruggeman; 12 Peter Burns; 13 Juan Flores; Infielders: 49 Matt Coutney; 31 Johan Macias; 15 Jake Munroe; 28 Ryan Nicholson; 4 Capri Ortiz; 2 Adrian Placencia; Outfielders: 19 Randy De Jesus; 9 Gage Harrelson; 7 Jorge Ruiz; 23 Anthony Scull | Manager: 11 Dann Bilardello; Coaches: 35 Ty Hawkins (hitting); 33 Glendon Rusch (pitching); 50 Brian Rupp (coach); 60-day injured list: -- Rio Foster (full season); -- Bridger Holmes; 7-day injured list; * On Los Angeles Angels 40-man roster; ~ Development list; # Rehab assignment; ∞ Reserve list; ‡ Restricted list; § Suspended list; † Temporarily inactive list; Roster updated May 14, 2026; Transactions; → More rosters: MiLB • Northwest League; → Los Angeles Angels minor league players |

=== Vancouver Canadians ===
Vancouver Canadians roster
| Players | Coaches/Other |
|---|---|
| Pitchers: 40 Trace Baker; 28 Gilberto Batista; 27 Eminen Flores; 31 Daniel Guerra; -- Silvano Hechavarria; 44 Johnny King; 22 Landen Maroudis; 20 Nolan Perry; 35 Carson Pierce; 32 Kelena Sauer; 34 Jay Schueler; 38 Danny Thompson Jr.; 33 Jonathan Todd; 1 Juanmi Vasquez; 30 Holden Wilkerson; 37 Reece Wissinger; Catchers: 12 Edward Duran; 25 Hayden Gilliland; 3 Jacob Sharp; Infielders: 7 Manuel Beltre; 23 Kendry Chirinos; 9 J. R. Freethy; 39 Dub Gleed; 6 Maddox Latta; 8 Tucker Toman; 40 Peyton Williams; Outfielders: 4 Jake Casey; 16 Carter Cunningham; 24 Alexis Hernandez; 19 Brennan Orf; 26 Matt Scannell | Manager: 17 José Mayorga; Coaches: 13 Thomas Caulfield (assistant pitching); -- Jonathan Davis (hitting); 14 Petr Stribrcky (coach); 15 Matt Van Roemer (bench); 29 Eric Yardley (pitching); 60-day injured list: 21 Colby Holcombe; -- Connor O'Halloran; -- Sam Shaw; 2 Mathieu Vallee; 7-day injured list; * On Toronto Blue Jays 40-man roster; ~ Development list; # Rehab assignment; ∞ Reserve list; ‡ Restricted list; § Suspended list; † Temporarily inactive list; Roster updated May 3, 2026; Transactions; → More rosters: MiLB • Northwest League; → Toronto Blue Jays minor league players |

== See also ==
- List of Midwest League team rosters
- List of South Atlantic League team rosters
