= Toronto Blue Jays minor league players =

Below is a partial list of Minor League Baseball players in the Toronto Blue Jays and rosters of their minor league affiliates.

== Players ==
=== Victor Arias ===
Victor Arias

Toronto Blue Jays
- Outfielder
- Born: August 24, 2003 (age 23); Maracay, Venezuela
- Bats: Left Throws: Left

Victor Gabriel Arias (born August 24, 2003) is a Venezuelan professional baseball outfielder in the Toronto Blue Jays organization. He is ranked 12th on Major League Baseball's 2026 Top 30 Blue Jays prospects list.

Arias signed with the Blue Jays in 2019 on his 16th birthday, but didn't make his debut with the Dominican Summer League Blue Jays until 2021 due to the COVID-19 pandemic. He was promoted from the DSL in 2023, and broke out in 2024, hitting .283/.390/.443 with 20 doubles, nine home runs, and 44 runs batted in (RBI) between the Low-A Dunedin Blue Jays and the High-A Vancouver Canadians. In 2025, he earned a promotion to the Double-A New Hampshire Fisher Cats. In a combined 102 games between Vancouver and New Hampshire, Arias hit .272 with seven home runs, 47 RBI, and 18 stolen bases.

- Career statistics from Baseball Reference (Minors)

=== Manuel Beltre ===
Manuel Beltre

Toronto Blue Jays
- Shortstop
- Born: June 9, 2004 (age 22); Santo Domingo Este, Dominican Republic
- Bats: Right Throws: Right

Manuel Beltre (born June 9, 2004) is a Dominican professional baseball shortstop in the Toronto Blue Jays organization.

Beltre signed with the Blue Jays in July 2020 as an international free agent, and received a $2.35 million signing bonus. He was assigned to the Dominican Summer League Blue Jays for the 2021 minor league season. In 53 games, Beltre batted .225 with two home runs, 29 runs batted in (RBI), and 10 stolen bases. Beltre also walked more than he struck out, with 42 and 33 respectively. He played most of the 2022 season with the Rookie-level Florida Complex League Blue Jays, and made a few late-season appearances for the Low-A Dunedin Blue Jays. In 54 total games, Beltre hit .250 with two home runs and 26 RBI.

Beltre played the entire 2023 season in Dunedin, batting .231 with six home runs and 50 RBI in 98 games. He remained in Dunedin in the 2024, hitting .236 with five home runs and 46 RBI in 108 games. Beltre played the entire 2025 season with Dunedin as well, and played for the Perth Heat of the Australian Baseball League (ABL) during the offseason.

- Career statistics from MLB · Fangraphs · Baseball Reference (Minors)

=== Micah Bucknam ===
Micah Bucknam

Toronto Blue Jays
- Pitcher
- Born: August 26, 2003 (age 23); Nelson, New Zealand
- Bats: Right Throws: Right

Micah Joel Bucknam (born August 26, 2003) is a Canadian professional baseball pitcher in the Toronto Blue Jays organization. He is ranked 18th on Major League Baseball's 2026 Top 30 Blue Jays prospects list.

Bucknam was born in New Zealand, but grew up in Canada, where he became a well-known high school prospect at Mennonite Educational Institute in Abbotsford, British Columbia. He was selected by the Blue Jays in the 16th round of the 2021 Major League Baseball draft, but chose to play college baseball at Louisiana State University instead. In 2023 and 2024, he played collegiate summer baseball with the Yarmouth–Dennis Red Sox of the Cape Cod Baseball League. After pitching just 16 innings over two years due to control issues at LSU, he transferred to Dallas Baptist University. He pitched to a 6–2 win–loss record, 4.62 earned run average, and 80 strikeouts in 62 1/3 innings. He selected by the Blue Jays in the 2025 Major League Baseball draft, this time in the fourth round, and received a $678,300 signing bonus.

Bucknam was placed on the full-season injured list prior to the start of 2026 minor league season.

- Career statistics from Baseball Reference (Minors)

=== Irv Carter ===
Irv Carter

Toronto Blue Jays
- Pitcher
- Born: October 9, 2002 (age 24); Freehold, New Jersey, U.S. (Note: It is not currently known whether this is Freehold Township, New Jersey or Freehold Borough, New Jersey.)
- Bats: Right Throws: Right

Irving Roosevelt Carter (born October 9, 2002) is an American professional baseball pitcher in the Toronto Blue Jays organization.

Carter attended Calvary Christian Academy in Fort Lauderdale, Florida. He was drafted by the Toronto Blue Jays in the fifth round of the 2021 Major League Baseball draft. In 2022, he was assigned to the Rookie-level Florida Complex League Blue Jays before being promoted to the Low-A Dunedin Blue Jays. Carter pitched to a combined 1–4 win–loss record, 5.48 earned run average (ERA), and 53 strikeouts in 47 2/3 innings. He spent the entire 2023 season in Dunedin but struggled greatly, going 0–7 in 13 appearances, with a 10.51 ERA and 30 strikeouts against 31 walks in 37 2/3 innings.

Converted into a reliever for the 2024 season, Carter improved, making 27 appearances for Dunedin and pitching to a 6–1 record, 3.18 ERA, and 58 strikeouts in 56 2/3 innings before earning a late-season promotion to the High-A Vancouver Canadians. He played the entire 2025 season with Vancouver, going 6–4 with a 5.67 ERA and 62 strikeouts in 60 1/3 innings.

- Career statistics from Baseball Reference (Minors)

=== Javen Coleman ===
Javen Coleman

Toronto Blue Jays
- Pitcher
- Born: December 3, 2001 (age 24); Sherman, Texas, U.S.
- Bats: Left Throws: Left

Javen Pierce Coleman (born December 3, 2001) is an American professional baseball pitcher in the Toronto Blue Jays organization.

Coleman was homeschooled and played baseball for the Northside Falcons, in a baseball program for home schooled students. He played college baseball for the LSU Tigers. Early in his sophomore year in 2022, he underwent Tommy John Surgery. Coleman returned from the injury in 2023 and was selected by the Los Angeles Dodgers in the 16th round of the 2023 Major League Baseball draft, but did not sign and returned to LSU.

After going unselected in the 2024 MLB draft, he signed with the Toronto Blue Jays. He spent his first professional season in 2025 with the Dunedin Blue Jays and Vancouver Canadians.

- Career statistics from Baseball Reference (Minors)

=== Jake Cook ===
Jake Cook

Toronto Blue Jays
- Outfielder
- Born: July 13, 2003 (age 23); Madison, Mississippi, U.S.
- Bats: Left Throws: Left

Jacob Scott Cook (born July 13, 2003) is an American professional baseball outfielder in the Toronto Blue Jays organization. He is ranked 11th on Major League Baseball's 2026 Top 30 Blue Jays prospects list.

Cook attended Madison Central High School in Madison, Mississippi and played college baseball at the University of Southern Mississippi. He was selected by the Toronto Blue Jays in the 3rd round of the 2025 Major League Baseball draft, 81st overall. His athleticism stood out at the MLB combine, leading all participants with a 3.51-second 30 yard dash and a 10-foot 8.25-inch long jump.

Cook signed with the Blue Jays for $922,500, slightly below the slot value of $993,900.

- Career statistics from Baseball Reference (Minors)

=== Edward Duran ===
Edward Duran

Toronto Blue Jays
- Catcher
- Born: May 29, 2004 (age 22); Caracas, Venezuela
- Bats: Right Throws: Right

Edward Orlando Duran (born May 29, 2004) is a Venezuelan professional baseball catcher in the Toronto Blue Jays organization. He is ranked 19th on Major League Baseball's 2026 Top 30 Blue Jays prospects list.

Duran signed with the Miami Marlins in 2021 for $450,000, where he spent 2 years with the Dominican Summer League Marlins. He was traded to the Toronto Blue Jays on August 31, 2022 as the player to be named later from a trade on August 2, joining the Blue Jays alongside Zach Pop and Anthony Bass in exchange for Jordan Groshans.

Duran spent 2023, 2024, and started 2025 with the Dunedin Blue Jays before earning a promotion to the High-A Vancouver Canadians after batting .296/.378/.439 with five home runs. Duran's best attribute is his defense, with a strong arm and good ability to receive the ball. He has a 60-grade arm and 55-grade fielding, per MLB.com

- Career statistics from Baseball Reference (Minors)

=== Daniel Guerra ===
Daniel Guerra

Toronto Blue Jays
- Pitcher
- Born: March 13, 2004 (age 22); Catia La Mar, Venezuela
- Bats: Right Throws: Right

Daniel David Guerra (born March 13, 2004) is a Venezuelan professional baseball pitcher for the Toronto Blue Jays of Major League Baseball (MLB).

Guerra signed with the Toronto Blue Jays as an international free agent in June 2022. The Blue Jays added him to their 40-man roster after the 2026 season.

- Career statistics from Baseball Reference (Minors)

=== Jay Harry ===
Jay Harry

Toronto Blue Jays
- Infielder / Outfielder
- Born: July 18, 2002 (age 24); New Brunswick, New Jersey, U.S.
- Bats: Left Throws: Right

Jay Joseph Harry (born July 18, 2002) is an American professional baseball infielder and outfielder in the Toronto Blue Jays organization.

Harry attended Metuchen High School in Metuchen, New Jersey and played college baseball at Penn State University. He was selected by the Minnesota Twins in the sixth round of the 2023 Major League Baseball draft.

Harry started his professional career with the Florida Complex League Twins and Fort Myers Mighty Mussels. On July 24, 2024, the Twins traded Harry to the Toronto Blue Jays for Trevor Richards.

Harry started 2026 with the New Hampshire Fisher Cats before being promoted to the Buffalo Bisons.

- Career statistics from Baseball Reference (Minors)

=== Dasan Hill ===
Dasan Hill

Toronto Blue Jays
- Pitcher
- Born: December 25, 2005 (age 20); Grapevine, Texas, U.S.
- Bats: Right Throws: Right

Dasan Hill (born December 25, 2005) is an American professional baseball pitcher in the Toronto Blue Jays organization.

Hill attended Grapevine High School in Grapevine, Texas. As a senior in 2024, he was The Dallas Morning News baseball player of the year after going 10–0 with a 0.90 earned run average (ERA) and 155 strikeouts in 77 2/3 innings. He was selected by the Minnesota Twins in the second round of the 2024 Major League Baseball draft.

Hill signed with the Twins and made his professional debut in 2025 with the Fort Myers Mighty Mussels.

On August 3, 2026, the Twins traded Hill, John Klein, and Dameury Pena to the Toronto Blue Jays in exchange for Jeff Hoffman.

- Career statistics from Baseball Reference (Minors)

=== Johnny King ===
Johnny King

Toronto Blue Jays
- Pitcher
- Born: July 26, 2006 (age 20); Commerce, Michigan, U.S.
- Bats: Left Throws: Left

Johnny H. King (born July 26, 2006) is an American professional baseball pitcher in the Toronto Blue Jays organization. He is ranked 4th on Major League Baseball's 2026 Top 30 Blue Jays prospects list.

King attended Naples High School in Naples, Florida. As a senior, he was 8–1 with a 0.73 earned run average (ERA) and 110 strikeouts over 47 2/3 innings. He was selected by the Toronto Blue Jays in the third round of the 2024 Major League Baseball draft.

King made his professional debut in 2025 with the Florida Complex League Blue Jays and was promoted to the Dunedin Blue Jays during the season.

- Career statistics from Baseball Reference (Minors)

=== Fernando Pérez ===
Fernando Pérez

Toronto Blue Jays
- Pitcher
- Born: February 12, 2004 (age 22); Rivas, Nicaragua
- Bats: Right Throws: Right

Fernando José Pérez (born February 12, 2004) is a Nicaraguan professional baseball pitcher for the Toronto Blue Jays organization. He is ranked 16th on Major League Baseball's 2026 Top 30 Blue Jays prospects list.

The Blue Jays signed Pérez as an international free agent for $10,000 in 2022. He was assigned to the Dominican Summer League Blue Jays, where he made 12 starts and pitched to a 1–4 win–loss record, 4.53 earned run average (ERA), and 48 strikeouts against just five walks in 43 2/3 innings pitched. In 2023, Pérez played for the Rookie-level Florida Complex League Blue Jays. In 11 games (10 starts), he went 2–2 with a 2.72 ERA and 57 strikeouts in 49 2/3 innings.

In 2024, Pérez was assigned to the Low-A Dunedin Blue Jays, and was selected to the American League's roster for the All-Star Futures Game. In 82 total innings with Dunedin, he pitched to a 3–2 record, 4.06 ERA, and 86 strikeouts over 17 starts. He began the 2025 season with the High-A Vancouver Canadians.

- Career statistics from MLB · Baseball Reference (Minors)

=== Nolan Perry ===
Nolan Perry

Toronto Blue Jays
- Pitcher
- Born: September 2, 2003 (age 23); Carlsbad, New Mexico, U.S.
- Bats: Right Throws: Right

Nolan Russel Perry (born September 2, 2003) is an American professional baseball pitcher for the Toronto Blue Jays of Major League Baseball (MLB).

Perry attended Carlsbad High School in Carlsbad, New Mexico. As a senior, he was the New Mexico Gatorade Baseball Player of the Year. He was selected by the Toronto Blue Jays in the 12th round of the 2022 Major League Baseball draft.

King made his professional debut in 2023 with the Florida Complex League Blue Jays. He started 2024 with the Dunedin Blue Jays before undergoing Tommy John Surgery which ended his season and caused him to miss the 2025 season. He returned in 2026 and started the year with Dunedin before being promoted to the Vancouver Canadians.

On November 17, 2026, He had his contract selected to the 40-man roster to protect him from the Rule 5 draft.

- Career statistics from MLB · Fangraphs · Baseball Reference (Minors)

=== Josh Rivera ===
Josh Rivera

Toronto Blue Jays
- Shortstop
- Born: October 10, 2000 (age 26); Sebring, Florida, U.S.
- Bats: Right Throws: Right

Joshua Ismael Rivera (born October 10, 2000) is an American professional baseball shortstop in the Toronto Blue Jays organization.

Rivera played college baseball for the Florida Gators for four seasons. He batted .253 with five home runs and 26 RBI as a sophomore. Rivera batted .38 with 19 home runs and 72 RBI during his senior season In 2021, he played collegiate summer baseball with the Chatham Anglers of the Cape Cod Baseball League.

Rivera was selected in the third round of the 2023 MLB draft by the Chicago Cubs. He signed with the team on July 19, 2023, and received a $725,000 signing bonus. After signing, Rivera was assigned to the Rookie-level Arizona Complex League Cubs to begin his professional career. He played three games before being promoted to the South Bend Cubs of the High-A Midwest League. On July 27, 2024, the Cubs traded Rivera and Yohendrick Piñango to the Toronto Blue Jays in exchange for Nate Pearson.

- Florida Gators bio
- Career statistics from Baseball Reference (Minors)

=== Juan Sánchez ===
Juan Sánchez

Toronto Blue Jays
- Third baseman
- Born: September 27, 2007 (age 19); Cotuí, Dominican Republic
- Bats: Right Throws: Right

Juan José Sánchez (born September 27, 2007) is a Dominican professional baseball third baseman and shortstop in the Toronto Blue Jays organization.

Sánchez signed with the Toronto Blue Jays as an international free agent in January 2025. He made his professional debut that season with the Dominican Summer League Blue Jays.

Sánchez started the 2026 season with the Dunedin Blue Jays.

- Career statistics from Baseball Reference (Minors)

=== Gage Stanifer ===
Gage Stanifer

Toronto Blue Jays
- Pitcher
- Born: November 18, 2003 (age 23); Indianapolis, Indiana, U.S.
- Bats: Right Throws: Right

Gage Patrick Stanifer (born November 18, 2003) is an American professional baseball pitcher in the Toronto Blue Jays organization. He is ranked 6th on Major League Baseball's 2026 Top 30 Blue Jays prospects list.

Stanifer attended Westfield High School in Westfield, Indiana. He was selected by the Toronto Blue Jays in the 19th round of the 2022 Major League Baseball draft.

Stanifer made his professional debut in 2023 with the Florida Complex League Blue Jays, for whom he was 1-4 with a 6.33 ERA. He played 2024 with the Dunedin Blue Jays for whom he was 3-5 with a 6.34 ERA. He started 2025 with Dunedin before being promoted to the Vancouver Canadians and then the New Hampshire Fisher Cats, and was a combined 8-6 with a 2.86 ERA as in 110 innings he struck out 161 batters.

- Career statistics from Baseball Reference (Minors)

=== Josh Stephan ===
Josh Stephan

Toronto Blue Jays
- Pitcher
- Born: November 1, 2001 (age 25); DeSoto, Texas, U.S.
- Bats: Right Throws: Right

Joshua James Stephan (born November 1, 2001) is an American professional baseball pitcher in the Toronto Blue Jays organization.

Stephan attended South Grand Prairie High School in Grand Prairie, Texas. Before his senior season of 2020 was cut short due to the COVID-19 pandemic, Stephan recorded 20 strikeouts over 14 innings pitched. He had committed to attend Stephen F. Austin University to play college baseball. Stephan was not selected in the shortened five-round 2020 MLB draft, but chose to sign as an undrafted free agent with the Texas Rangers for the maximum allowed signing bonus of $20,000.

Stephan split his professional debut season of 2021 between the ACL Rangers of the Rookie-level Arizona Complex League and the Down East Wood Ducks of the Low-A East, going a combined 2–2 with a 5.18 ERA and 50 strikeouts over 40 innings. Stephan made 21 starts in 2022, with the first 19 back with Down East and the final three games for the Hickory Crawdads of the High-A South Atlantic League. He posted a combined 6–5 record with a 3.14 ERA and 115 strikeouts over 103 1/3 innings in 2022. Stephan returned to Hickory to open the 2023 season. After posting a 6–3 record with a 2.17 ERA and 73 strikeouts over 62 1/3 innings, he was promoted to the Frisco RoughRiders of the Double-A Texas League on July 4. Stephan made just one start for Frisco before missing the rest of the season due to a lower back injury.

On August 3, 2026, the Rangers traded Stephan and Josh Smith to the Toronto Blue Jays in exchange for Adam Macko. On November 3, Stephan re-signed with the Blue Jays on a new minor league contract for the 2027 season.

- Career statistics from MLB · ESPN · Baseball Reference (Minors)

=== Tucker Toman ===
Tucker Toman

Toronto Blue Jays
- Third baseman
- Born: November 12, 2003 (age 23); Columbia, South Carolina, U.S.
- Bats: Both Throws: Right

Kendall Tucker Toman (born November 12, 2003) is an American professional baseball third baseman in the Toronto Blue Jays organization.

Toman was born in Columbia, South Carolina, and attended the Hammond School. He began playing on Hammond's varsity baseball team when he was in the eighth grade. Toman is committed to play college baseball at LSU. As a junior, Toman hit .502 with eight home runs, and 25 RBIs. Following the season he played for the under-18 US National Baseball team. He was named a preseason All-American by Baseball America entering his senior season. Toman finished the season with a .487 batting average, seven home runs, and 27 RBIs.

The Toronto Blue Jays selected Toman 77th overall in the 2022 Major League Baseball draft. He signed with the Blue Jays on July 24, 2022, and received an over-slot $2 million signing bonus.

Toman is the son of Middle Tennessee State head baseball coach Jim Toman.

- Career statistics from Baseball Reference (Minors)

== Full Triple-A to Rookie League rosters ==
=== Triple-A ===
Buffalo Bisons roster
Players		Coaches/Other
Pitchers: -- Javen Coleman; -- Nic Enright; 35 Lázaro Estrada; 12 Pat Gallagher; 28 Richard Gallardo; 54 Sam Gardner; 37 Devereaux Harrison; 39 Yariel Rodríguez; 10 Grant Rogers; 50 Yondrei Rojas; 31 Gage Stanifer; 21 Josh Stephan; 32 Josh Winckowski	Catchers Infielders: 45 Nick Goodwin; 7 Jay Harry; 4 Josh Kasevich; 24 Josh Rivera; Outfielders: -- Rudy Martin Jr.	Manager: 11 Casey Candaele; Coaches: 41 Trevor Cho (assistant hitting); 87 Drew Hayes (pitching); 77 Henry Leake (assistant pitching); 14 Cesar Martin (bench); 81 Chris Schaeffer (coach); 95 Matt Young (hitting); 7-day injured list; * On Toronto Blue Jays 40-man roster; ~ Development list; # Rehab assignment; ∞ Reserve list; ‡ Restricted list; § Suspended list; † Temporarily inactive list; Roster updated November 17, 2026; Transactions; → More rosters: MiLB • International League; → Toronto Blue Jays minor league players

=== Double-A ===
New Hampshire Fisher Cats roster
Players		Coaches/Other
Pitchers: 18 Alex Amalfi; 4 T.J. Brock; 10 Austin Cates; 17 Johnny King; 12 Aaron Munson; 22 Angel Obando; 16 Mason Olson; 37 Fernando Pérez; 24 Kelena Sauer; 1 Danny Thompson Jr.; 31 Jonathan Todd; -- Ryan Watson; 41 Jackson Wentworth; -- Chay Yeager	Catchers: 15 Renyel Campos; 25 Edward Duran; 20 Aaron Parker; 30 Geovany Planchart; 13 Jacob Sharp; Infielders: 3 Cutter Coffey; 9 J.R. Freethy; 6 Dub Gleed; 7 Eric Snow; 8 Tucker Toman; Outfielders: 2 Victor Arias; 8 Jace Bohrofen; 14 Carter Cunningham; 19 Alexis Hernandez; 15 Hedbert Perez; 5 Adrian Pinto; 11 Mathieu Vallee	Manager: 28 John Tamargo Jr.; Coaches: -- Robelin Bautista (assistant pitching); -- Austin Bibens-Dirkx (pitching); -- Mitch Huckabay (hitting); 35 Mike McRae (bench); 23 Luis Silva (coach); 7-day injured list; * On Toronto Blue Jays 40-man roster; ~ Development list; # Rehab assignment; ∞ Reserve list; ‡ Restricted list; § Suspended list; † Temporarily inactive list; Roster updated November 17, 2026; Transactions; → More rosters: MiLB • Eastern League; → Toronto Blue Jays minor league players

=== High-A ===
Vancouver Canadians roster
Players		Coaches/Other
Pitchers: 40 Trace Baker; 1 Brandon Barriera; 28 Gilberto Batista; 8 Dax Dathe; 10 Jack Eshleman; 34 Reece Fields; 27 Troy Guthrie; 48 Silvano Hechavarria; 19 Dasan Hill; 21 Colby Holcombe; 22 Landen Maroudis; 5 Carson Myers; 33 Connor O'Halloran; 16 Franly Urena; 39 Dylan Watts; 30 Holden Wilkerson; 25 Bradley Wilson; 37 Reece Wissinger	Catchers: 38 Ryan Sprock; 3 Jaxson West; Infielders: 6 Maddox Latta; 23 Gable Mitchell; 13 JoJo Parker; 39 Dameury Pena; 2 Dariel Ramon; 8 Ty Southisene; Outfielders: 24 David Calabrese; 4 Jake Casey; 7 Bryce Chance; 20 Jean Joseph; -- Sam Shaw; 26 Austin Smith	Manager: 17 José Mayorga; Coaches: 13 Thomas Caulfield (assistant pitching); -- Jonathan Davis (hitting); 14 Petr Stribrcky (coach); 15 Matt Van Roemer (bench); 29 Eric Yardley (pitching); 7-day injured list; * On Toronto Blue Jays 40-man roster; ~ Development list; # Rehab assignment; ∞ Reserve list; ‡ Restricted list; § Suspended list; † Temporarily inactive list; Roster updated November 13, 2026; Transactions; → More rosters: MiLB • Northwest League; → Toronto Blue Jays minor league players

=== Single-A ===
Dunedin Blue Jays roster
Players		Coaches/Other
Pitchers: 18 Reese Bassinger; -- Eduar Gonzalez; 40 Brayden Heidel; 26 Nolan Higgins; 24 Karson Ligon; 46 Carson Messina; 33 Jack Nedrow; 5 Miguel Pantoja; 39 Dayne Pengelly; 37 Deiker Pineda; 3 Blake Purnell; 25 Denis Samudio; 31 Gavin Seebold; 45 Jared Spencer; 9 Giacomo Taschin; 51 Edrwin Veras; 43 Landon Waters; 44 Isaac Williams	Catchers: 14 Jake Bennett; 20 Owen Carapellotti; 16 Giaconino Lasarcina; Infielders: 21 Ryan Cooney; 7 Ryan Franden; 30 Aldo Gaxiola; -- Owen Gregg; 41 Brayden Martin; 8 Juan Sánchez; Outfielders: 22 Enmanuel Bonilla; 23 Blaine Bullard; 6 Jake Cook; 1 Dean West	Manager: -- Ryan Casteel; Coaches: -- Antonio Caceres (assistant pitching); -- Andy Fermin (coach); -- Brett Kennedy (pitching); -- Nash Knight (hitting); -- Ashley Stephenson (bench); 7-day injured list; * On Toronto Blue Jays 40-man roster; ~ Development list; # Rehab assignment; ∞ Reserve list; ‡ Restricted list; § Suspended list; † Temporarily inactive list; Roster updated November 13, 2026; Transactions; → More rosters: MiLB • Florida State League; → Toronto Blue Jays minor league players

=== Rookie ===
Florida Complex League Blue Jays roster
Players		Coaches/Other
Pitchers: -- Micah Bucknam; -- Cole Carlon; -- Carson Cromier; -- Oliver de la Torre; -- Jake Faherty; -- Santiago Garcia; -- Devon King; -- Connor Kelley; -- Luke Kovach; -- Isaiah Magdaleno; 99 Seojun Moon; -- Mathis Nayral; 34 Jhon Rivas; 26 Aiden Taggart	Catchers: -- Will Brick; 20 Franklin Rojas; -- Charlie Saum; Infielders: 6 Kennew Blanco; 9 Rafael Flores; 38 Angel Guzman; 19 Tim Piasentin; 5 Gavin Smith; 13 Sam White; Outfielders: 44 Pascual Archila; 16 Andres Arias; 72 Daz Cameron; -- Bryce Chance; 38 Angel Guzman; 17 David Guzman; -- Eddie Rosado Jr.; -- Ian Taylor; -- Joey Urban; 92 Edgardo Villegas	Manager: 24 Danny Canellas; Coaches: 12 Jesus Azuaje (hitting); -- Sawyer Bridges (assistant pitching); -- Jacob Caples (hitting); -- Angel Guzman (coach); -- Yoel Hernández (pitching); 4 Dimas Ponce (bench); 7-day injured list; * On Toronto Blue Jays 40-man roster; ~ Development list; # Rehab assignment; ∞ Reserve list; ‡ Restricted list; § Suspended list; † Temporarily inactive list; Roster updated November 13, 2026; Transactions; → More rosters: MiLB • Florida Complex League; → Toronto Blue Jays minor league players

Dominican Summer League Blue Jays Blue roster
Players		Coaches/Other
Pitchers: 12 Jose Alvarez; 23 Jose Andrades; 19 Enmanuel Araujo; 21 Roberto Castellanos; -- Woo-jin Cho; 16 Sahir De La Cruz; 33 Johan Figuera; 13 Evington Gascon; 8 Elian Guzman; 41 Celwin Hurkmans; 23 Orlando Marcelin; 6 Ire Martinez; 29 Yoenis Morales; 36 Kenyer Navarro; 31 Sebastian Rodriguez; 26 Wagner Soto; 58 Marcelino Theodore; 39 Yancarlos Vasquez; -- Angel Ynfante	Catchers: 14 Juan Caricote; 2 Isay Veras; Infielders: 10 J.T. Bain; 5 Yariel Cordero; 24 Eiker Lothar; 1 Cristopher Polanco; 9 Ruben Sanchez; Outfielders: 27 Luis Felipe; 8 Deret Gonzalez; 44 Fabian Gonzalez	Manager: 7 Ashley Ponce; Coaches: 14 Jose Ferrer (bench); 34 Ramon Marte (assistant pitching); 47 Jose Mateo (coach); 27 Ricardo Nanita (hitting); 49 Victor Ramos (pitching); 7-day injured list; * On Toronto Blue Jays 40-man roster; ~ Development list; # Rehab assignment; ∞ Reserve list; ‡ Restricted list; § Suspended list; † Temporarily inactive list; Roster updated November 11, 2026; Transactions; → More rosters: MiLB • Dominican Summer League; → Toronto Blue Jays minor league players

Dominican Summer League Blue Jays Red roster
Players		Coaches/Other
Pitchers: 47 Bryan Borbon; 23 Gabriel Brito; -- Julio Chivilli; 21 Daniel De La Cruz; 30 Abrahan Diaz; 35 Cristhian Duarte; 34 Fayon Dumorne; 25 Cristhian Espinosa; 18 Tomoya Kinjo; 26 Jose Melo; 11 Adrian Moreta; 28 Carlos Olivo; 39 Carlos Pena; 32 Raduan Perez; 12 Juan Ramirez; 32 Rodrigo Ramirez; 19 Franiel Severino; 51 Alieski Torres; 22 Jarlin Ugarte	Catchers: 6 Diego Arce; 38 Jose Gori; 41 Samuel Orellana; 18 Ayberson Ortega; Infielders: -- Sebastian Casanova; 10 Elaineiker Coronado; 17 Frelian Flores; 5 Alex Linares; 4 Darwin Nuñez; 1 Gabriel Porras; Outfielders: 45 Michael Mesa; 15 Luis Nunez; 36 Elian Reyes; 27 Aneudi Severino	Manager: 13 Deiferson Barreto; Coaches: 14 Brandon Gonzalez (bench); 16 Reed Lavallee (coach); 50 Rafael Monsion (pitching); 37 Juan Nunez (assistant pitching); 40 Mark Ossanna (hitting); 7-day injured list; * On Toronto Blue Jays 40-man roster; ~ Development list; # Rehab assignment; ∞ Reserve list; ‡ Restricted list; § Suspended list; † Temporarily inactive list; Roster updated November 19, 2026; Transactions; → More rosters: MiLB • Dominican Summer League; → Toronto Blue Jays minor league players
