= Walter Ford =

Walter Ford may refer to:

- Walter Burton Ford (1874–1971), American mathematician and philanthropist
- Walter Ford (baseball) (born 2004), American baseball pitcher

== See also ==
- Walter Forde (1898–1984), British actor, screenwriter and director
