= Vancouver Canadians =

- Founded in 2000; Vancouver, British Columbia
Team logo
Cap insignia

Minor league affiliations
- Class: High-A (2021–present)
- Previous classes: Class A Short Season (2000–2020)
- League: Northwest League (2000–present)

Major league affiliations
- Team: Toronto Blue Jays (2011–present)
- Previous teams: Oakland Athletics (2000–2010)

Minor league titles
- League titles (6): 2011; 2012; 2013; 2017; 2023; 2026
- Division titles (7): 2004; 2005; 2011; 2012; 2013; 2014; 2017
- First-half titles (1): 2023
- Second-half titles (2): 2022; 2024
- Wild card berths (2): 2011; 2026

Team data
- Colors: Red, dark red, black, silver, white
- Mascot: Bob Brown Bear
- Ballpark: Nat Bailey Stadium (2000–present); Ron Tonkin Field (2021)
- Owner/ Operator: Diamond Baseball Holdings
- General manager: Allan Bailey
- Manager: José Mayorga
- Website: mlb.com/milb/vancouver

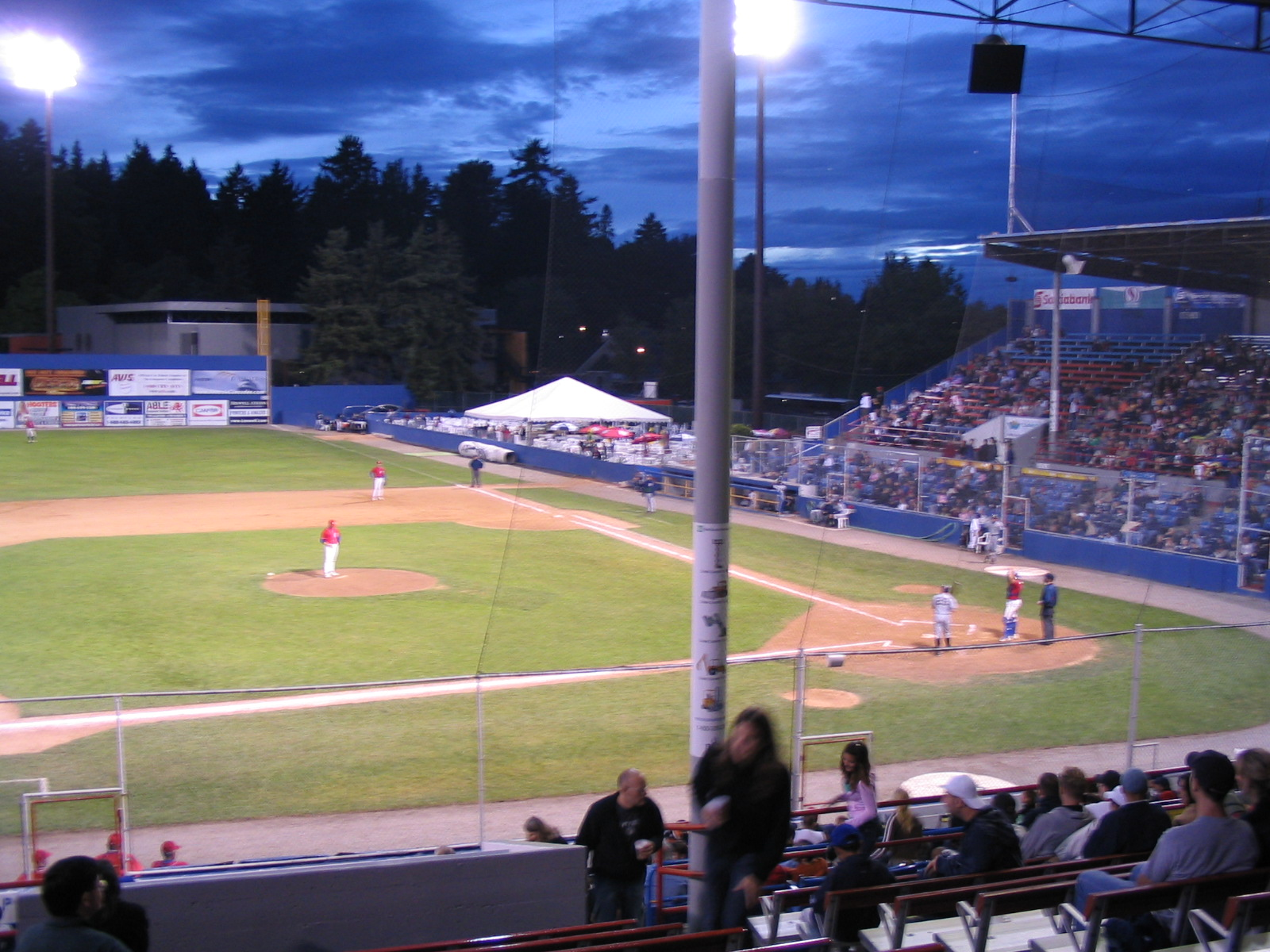
A game at Nat Bailey Stadium in 2007

The Vancouver Canadians are a Minor League Baseball (MiLB) team located in Vancouver, British Columbia. They are members of the Northwest League and the High-A affiliate of the Toronto Blue Jays. The Canadians play their home games at Nat Bailey Stadium, which was built in 1951. They have been the only MiLB team based in Canada since the Ottawa Lynx relocated to Allentown, Pennsylvania, in 2008.

The Canadians were established in 2000 after the original Vancouver Canadians, a Triple-A team of the Pacific Coast League, relocated to Sacramento, California. They served as the Class A Short Season affiliate of the Oakland Athletics through 2010. Vancouver became a farm team of the Toronto Blue Jays in 2011. After the 2021 restructuring of the minor leagues by Major League Baseball, the Northwest League was reclassified as a High-A circuit, and the Canadians continued their affiliation with Toronto.

Vancouver has won six Northwest League championships—all as a Blue Jays affiliate—including three-in-a-row from 2011 to 2013. With their most recent win in 2026, they hold the third-most titles among active Northwest League teams.

== History ==
Prior to the 1999 season, the Vancouver Canadians, a Triple-A franchise of the Pacific Coast League, was purchased by a group led by Art Savage with the intention of relocating to Sacramento, California. The Canadians moved to California's capital city and were rebranded as the Sacramento River Cats. The Southern Oregon Timberjacks of the Northwest League announced their relocation to Vancouver after the franchise failed to find a new stadium to remain in Oregon. The team, a Class A Short Season team of the Northwest League, assumed the Canadians' name in 2000.

Like the predecessor Pacific Coast League franchise, the new Canadians signed a player development contract with the Oakland Athletics. The Canadians had players such as Nick Swisher, Jeremy Brown, Jason Windsor, Joe Blanton, Rich Harden, Travis Buck, Dallas Braden, and Dan Straily during this period.

=== 2000 ===
In the Northwest League Canadians' inaugural season, the franchise finished with a record of 39 wins and 37 losses but missed the playoffs with a second-place finish in the Western Division, one game behind the Eugene Emeralds.

=== 2001 ===
In their second season, Vancouver posted a losing record of 37–39 and finished second in their division, 14 games behind the Salem-Keizer Volcanoes.

=== 2002 ===
The 2002 Canadians had an identical 37–39 record and finished fourth in their division, 7 games behind the Everett Aquasox.

=== 2003 ===
In the 2003 season, the team finished with a record of 35–41 and finished fourth in their division, 8 games behind the Salem-Keizer Volcanoes.

=== 2004 ===
The Canadians ended the 2004 campaign tied with the Boise Hawks for a league-best 42–34 record, clinching a spot in the playoffs for the first time in franchise history. However, the team was swept in three games by Boise in the best-of-five Northwest League championship series.

=== 2005 ===
Vancouver returned to the playoffs in 2005 with a league-leading 46–30 mark. They were defeated in the championship series in five games to the Spokane Indians.

=== 2006 ===
In the Canadians' 2026 season, they missed the playoffs with a 39–37 record, finishing fourth in their division, 16 games behind the Salem-Keizer Volcanoes.

=== 2007 ===
In 2007, local Vancouver businessmen Jake Kerr and Jeff Mooney purchased the franchise and secured a 25-year lease with the City of Vancouver Parks Board. Extensive work began that offseason in a full-scale stadium renovation which improved washrooms, concessions, concourses, and the children's play area. Point-of-purchase concessions increased substantially.

On the field, the Canadians finished the season 37–38, placing second in their division, 19 1/2 behind the Salem-Keizer Volcanos.

=== 2008 ===
In January 2008, former Washington Nationals executive Andy Dunn was made the President and General Manager of the Canadians and held the position until he resigned in 2024.

The Canadians ended the season with a losing record of 34–42 and finished third in their division, 6 games behind both the Eugene Emeralds and the Salem-Keizer Volcanos, who were tied for the division lead.

=== 2009 ===
In 2009, the Canadians posted a 36–40 record, finishing third in their division, 13 games behind the Salem-Keizer Volcanos.

=== 2010 ===
In June 2010, the Vancouver Canadians and Scotiabank agreed to a long-term partnership that saw Nat Bailey Stadium renamed to Scotiabank Field at Nat Bailey Stadium.

The Canadians had a winning record of 42–34 and made the playoffs for the first time since 2005 by winning the Second-Half Western Division title. The team ultimately lost the division finals by being swept, two games to none, by the Everett Aquasox.

=== 2011 ===
The Canadians became the Short-Season A affiliate of the Toronto Blue Jays in 2011. The team's attendance rose to 162,162, a team record. In September 2011, the Vancouver Canadians won their first Northwest League championship, defeating the Tri-City Dust Devils, two games to one.

=== 2012 ===
In 2012, Vancouver became back-to-back champions after defeating the Boise Hawks, 2–1, in the finals.

=== 2013 ===
In August 2013, outfielder Kevin Pillar became the first alumnus of the team to debut in the major leagues for Toronto.

On September 9, the Canadians became the third Northwest League team to win three straight championships, defeating Boise, 5–0, at Scotiabank Field at Nat Bailey Stadium to win the final series, 2–1, in front of a sellout crowd. The 2013 season also saw the Vancouver Canadians draw over 195,000 fans to Scotiabank Field, a fifth consecutive team record which included 23 sold-out games.

On November 4, 2013, the Canadians were named the 2013 recipient of the John H. Johnson President's Award, given to Minor League Baseball's top organization. It was the first time a Canadian-based franchise won the award.

=== 2014 ===
In the 2014 campaign, the team made it to the finals for the fifth consecutive season but failed to defend their three consecutive championships by being swept in the finals by the Hillsboro Hops.

=== 2015 ===
In the franchise's 2015 campaign, they missed the playoffs for the first time since the 2009 season tied for last place in their division with the Spokane Indians, finishing the season at 34–42, eight games behind the Everett Aquasox.

=== 2016 ===
In 2016, the Canadians led the Northwest League with a total attendance of 222,363, averaging 6,177 per game. This earned them the 2016 Esurance "Home Field Advantage Award", given to the organization in each affiliated minor league with the greatest attendance per percentage capacity.

Vancouver missed the playoffs for the second consecutive season finishing the campaign last in their division with a losing record of 29–45, fifteen games behind the Everett Aquasox.

=== 2017 ===
In 2017, the Canadians won their fourth championship after a four year drought, defeating Eugene, 3–1. They beat their previous attendance record with 239,527 people in total attendance for the 2017 season, averaging 6,303 per game. On January 26, 2018, Toronto extended their player-development contract with Vancouver through the 2022 season.

=== 2018 ===
Although the Canadians were unable to make the playoffs in 2018, coming in a close second in both the first and second half of the season, they still lead the league in attendance with a 239,086 in total attendance.

=== 2019 ===
The 2019 Canadians finished the season with a 30–46 record, 15 games behind the Spokane Indians and did not make the playoffs.

=== 2020 ===
Due to the COVID-19 pandemic, the Minor League Baseball season was cancelled. In the winter of 2020 as part the reorganization of Minor League Baseball, Vancouver received an invitation to continue as the Blue Jays' High-A affiliate. In a further change, they were organized into the High-A West along with five other teams previously of the Northwest League. The Scotiabank naming rights agreement also expired in 2020 and the stadium reverted back to its original name after Scotiabank declined to renew its contract.

=== 2021 ===
The team began the 2021 season playing its home games at Ron Tonkin Field (the home field of the Hillsboro Hops) in Hillsboro, Oregon, due to COVID-19 border restrictions. The Canadians finished fifth and were eliminated from playoff contention.

=== 2022 ===
Prior to the 2022 season, the High-A West became known as the Northwest League, the name historically used by the regional circuit prior to the 2021 reorganization. Vancouver finished second, qualifying for the first time to the new Northwest League playoffs system. Under the new procedures, a single best-of-five series is played to determine the championship. The Canadians lost the championship series by being swept, 3–0, by Eugene.

=== 2023 ===
Before the 2023 season, Mooney and Kerr sold the team to Diamond Baseball Holdings, a private equity group that owns over 47 minor league baseball teams. Also, Rogers Communications signed a five-year contract to rename their ballpark Roger's Field at Nat Bailey Stadium.

The Canadians led the league at 77–54 and qualified for the playoffs by winning the first-half title with a 38–27 record. Vancouver defeated the Everett Aquasox, 3–1, to win their first High-A Northwest League championship and their first league championship since 2017.

=== 2024 ===
The 2024 season saw the Canadians again qualify for the playoffs as defending league champions for the first time since their 2012 season by winning the second-half title. However, the team ultimately failed to defend their title by losing the championship series, 3–1, to Spokane.

=== 2025 ===
In the 2025 season, the Vancouver Canadians set a new franchise record with an eight-game losing streak from May 15 to 23. The skid began with a 5–4 home loss to the Everett AquaSox on May 15. During the same series, the Canadians also dropped both games of a May 18 doubleheader to Everett. They then traveled to Eugene, Oregon, where their struggles continued with four more losses to the Eugene Emeralds. The losing streak finally ended on May 24, when the Canadians shut out the Emeralds, 9–0, at PK Park.

In June, the Canadians set a new franchise record for consecutive wins. The streak began on June 5, with a 9–4 victory over the Tri-City Dust Devils in Pasco, Washington, at Gesa Stadium. They matched their nine-game winning streak record on June 14 with a 6–1 home victory over the Spokane Indians in front of a sold-out crowd, and then set a new franchise record the following day with a 3–2 win over the Indians before another sold-out home crowd. The Canadians also swept the six-game series, marking the first time in Spokane Indians history that they had been swept since being promoted to High-A.

The franchise record was extended to an 11-game winning streak on June 17 with a 12–8 victory over the Emeralds at PK Park. The Canadians fell short on June 18 with an 8–1 loss, ending their record-setting winning streak. The Canadians had previously matched their nine-game winning streak three times in the past four years but had not been able to break that record until the 2025 season. They finished the first-half with a 37–29 record, tied with Everett, who got the playoff berth due to winning the head-to-head tiebreaker.

On August 13, the Canadians turned their first triple play in High-A franchise history against the Indians in Spokane. The 1-6-3-2 triple play happened in the bottom of the 7th, when pitcher Aaron Munson threw to shortstop Arjun Nimmala, who then threw to first baseman Carter Cunningham, who threw home to catcher Edward Duran, who tagged the runner out. The Canadians missed the playoffs for the first time since 2021, when they placed second in the second-half, 11 games behind the Eugene Emeralds.

=== 2026 ===
In the 2026 season, the Canadians made the playoffs after missing the previous postseason by finishing second-best in the league. Vancouver won their sixth Northwest League championship by sweeping Eugene in three games, ending a three year championship drought.

== Ballpark ==
The Canadians play their home games at Nat Bailey Stadium, which first hosted minor league baseball in 1951. During the 2026 Vancouver Canadians season, the stadium celebrated its 75th anniversary as a baseball venue with many promotions including 75 cent hotdogs on select days and 5 pennant giveaway days recognizing previous teams that played at the ballpark throughout its history.

== Season-by-season records ==
Season-by-season records (last five seasons)
Season	League	Regular-season					Postseason			MLB affiliate	Ref.
Season	League	Record	Win %	League	Division	GB	Record	Win %	Result	MLB affiliate	Ref.
2022	NWL	67–62	.519	2nd	—	14	0–3	.000	Won Second-Half title Lost NWL championship vs. Eugene Emeralds, 3–0	Toronto Blue Jays	
2023	NWL	77–54	.588	1st	—	—	3–1	.750	Won First-Half title Won NWL championship vs. Everett AquaSox, 3–1	Toronto Blue Jays	
2024	NWL	68–61	.527	2nd	—	10 1/2	1–3	.250	Won Second-Half title Lost NWL championship vs. Spokane Indians, 3–1	Toronto Blue Jays	
2025	NWL	75–57	.586	2nd	—	6	—	—	—	Toronto Blue Jays	
2026	NWL	64–68	.485	3rd (tie)	—	15 1/2	3–0	1.000	Won Wild-Card berth Won NWL championship vs. Eugene Emeralds, 3–0	Toronto Blue Jays	
Totals	—	351–302	.538	—	—	—	7–7	.500	—	—	—

== Attendance ==
Season	Total attendance	Average attendance	Percent change	Ref.
2000	109,576	2,884	N/A	
2001	118,357	3,115	+8.0%	
2002	127,099	3,345	+7.4%	
2003	137,026	3,606	+7.8%	
2004	140,037	3,685	+2.2%	
2005	124,708	3,370	–8.5%	
2006	123,878	3,260	–3.3%	
2007	126,491	3,419	+4.9%	
2008	129,073	3,585	+4.9%	
2009	149,297	3,929	+9.6%	
2010	154,592	4,068	+3.5%	
2011	162,162	4,267	+4.9%	
2012	164,461	4,445	+4.2%	
2013	184,042	4,843	+9.0%	
2014	180,187	4,870	+0.6%	
2015	215,535	5,825	+19.6%	
2016	222,363	6,177	+6.0%	
2017	239,527	6,303	+2.0%	
2018	239,086	6,292	–0.2%	
2019	235,980	6,210	–1.3%	
2020 (Note: The 2020 season was cancelled due to the COVID-19 pandemic.)	—	—	—	
2021 (Note: Due to pandemic travel restrictions during the 2021 season, the Canadians played in front of reduced crowds at Ron Tonkin Field in Hillsboro, Oregon.)	15,822	286	—	
2022 (Note: Due to being promoted from Class A Short Season to High-A, Northwest League teams have played an increased number of games since 2021.)	313,256	4,857	+1879.88%	
2023	297,437	4,541	–5.05%	
2024	274,892	4,262	–7.58%	
2025	277,990	4,212	+1.13%	
2026	276,766	4,193	–0.01%	

== Roster ==
Vancouver Canadians roster
Players		Coaches/Other
Pitchers: 40 Trace Baker; 1 Brandon Barriera; 28 Gilberto Batista; 8 Dax Dathe; 10 Jack Eshleman; 34 Reece Fields; 27 Troy Guthrie; 48 Silvano Hechavarria; 19 Dasan Hill; 21 Colby Holcombe; 22 Landen Maroudis; 5 Carson Myers; 33 Connor O'Halloran; 16 Franly Urena; 30 Holden Wilkerson; 25 Bradley Wilson; 37 Reece Wissinger	Catchers: 38 Ryan Sprock; 3 Jaxson West; Infielders: 6 Maddox Latta; 23 Gable Mitchell; 13 JoJo Parker; 39 Dameury Pena; 2 Dariel Ramon; 8 Ty Southisene; 9 Max Viera; Outfielders: 24 David Calabrese; 4 Jake Casey; 7 Bryce Chance; 20 Jean Joseph; -- Sam Shaw; 26 Austin Smith	Manager: 17 José Mayorga; Coaches: 13 Thomas Caulfield (assistant pitching); -- Jonathan Davis (hitting); 14 Petr Stribrcky (coach); 15 Matt Van Roemer (bench); 29 Eric Yardley (pitching); 60-day injured list: 27 Eminen Flores; 39 Dylan Watts; 7-day injured list; * On Toronto Blue Jays 40-man roster; ~ Development list; # Rehab assignment; ∞ Reserve list; ‡ Restricted list; § Suspended list; † Temporarily inactive list; Roster updated September 21, 2026; Transactions; → More rosters: MiLB • Northwest League; → Toronto Blue Jays minor league players

== Media ==
In the 2019 season, radio rights moved from CKST to CISL Sportsnet 650. As part of the deal, Sportsnet Pacific also gained rights to air a package of Canadians games on television.

== Notable former players in the major leagues ==
- Trey Yesavage (2025)
- Alan Roden (2023)
- Mason Fluharty (2022–2023)
- Leo Jiménez (2022)
- Steward Berroa (2022)
- Lazaro Estrada (2021, 2024)
- Addison Barger (2021–2022)
- Orelvis Martínez (2021)
- Brandon Eisert (2021)
- Hagen Danner (2021)
- Max Castillo (2021)
- Adam Kloffenstein (2019, 2021–2022)
- Davis Schneider (2019, 2021–2022)
- Will Robertson (2019, 2021)
- Cam Eden (2019, 2021)
- Luis De Los Santos (2019, 2021)
- Spencer Horwitz (2019, 2021)
- Alek Manoah (2019)
- Vinny Capra (2018)
- Zach Logue (2017)
- Travis Bergen (2017)
- Cavan Biggio (2016)
- Lane Thomas (2015)
- Tim Mayza (2014)
- Tim Locastro (2014)
- Miguel Castro (2014)
- Ryan Borucki (2014)
- Franklin Barreto (2014)
- Richard Urena (2014)
- Roberto Osuna (2012)
- Daniel Norris (2012)
- Dalton Pompey (2012)
- Marcus Stroman (2012)
- Kevin Pillar (2011)
- Aaron Sanchez (2011)
- Noah Syndergaard (2011)
- Justin Nicolino (2011)
- A. J. Griffin (2010)
- Ian Krol (2009)
- Dan Straily (2009)
- Max Stassi (2009)
- Sean Doolittle (2007)
- Andrew Bailey (2006)
- Justin Sellers (2005)
- Jeff Gray (2005)
- Anthony Recker (2005)
- Travis Buck (2005)
- Kurt Suzuki (2004)
- Dallas Braden (2004)
- Landon Powell (2004)
- Gregorio Petit (2004)
- Alexi Ogando (2004)
- Omar Quintanilla (2003)
- Andre Ethier (2003)
- Santiago Casilla (2002)
- Jared Burton (2002)
- Joe Blanton (2002)
- Mark Teahen (2002)
- Nick Swisher (2002)
- Nelson Cruz (2002)
- John Baker (2002)
- Mike Wood (2001)
- Rich Harden (2001)
- Neal Cotts (2001)
- Dan Johnson (2001)
- Franklyn Germán (2000)
- Ron Flores (2000)
- Freddie Bynum (2000)

== Notes ==
Preceded by Southern Oregon Timberjacks	Northwest League franchise 2000–present	Succeeded by —
