= Roger Hansen =

American baseball coach and player (born 1961)

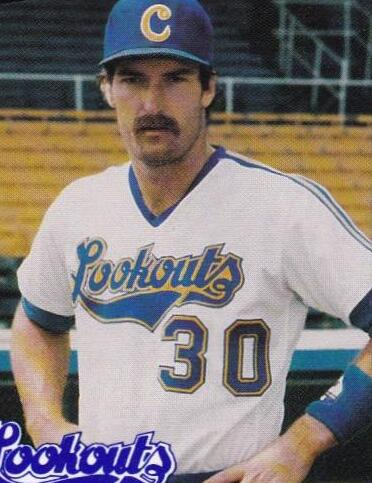
- Hansen with the Chattanooga Lookouts c. 1987
- Catcher / Bench coach
- Born: August 28, 1961 (age 65); Johnstown, Pennsylvania, U.S.
- Bats: Right Throws: Right
- Stats at Baseball Reference

Teams
- As coach: Seattle Mariners (1992, 2010)

Roger Christian Hansen (born August 28, 1961) is an American former professional baseball player and coach. Hansen primarily played catcher during his playing career, but occasionally played first base and third base. Hansen played in the minor leagues from 1980 to 1989, never reaching Major League Baseball. After playing in the Seattle Mariners organization the final three years of his career, he became a coach for the Mariners, serving as bullpen coach in 1992 and later bench coach at the end of 2010. He was the team's long-time minor league catching coordinator and special assistant to the general manager. He also coached for the Orix BlueWave in Japan's Nippon Professional Baseball.

== Playing career ==
Hansen was drafted by the Kansas City Royals in the second round of the 1980 Major League Baseball draft out of Rio Mesa High School in Oxnard, California. He began his professional career with the rookie-level GCL Royals. In 55 games, Hansen batted .228 with 38 hit, three doubles and two triples. In 1981, Hansen was promoted to the Class-A Charleston Royals where he batted .242 with 125 hits, 28 doubles, six triples and six home runs in 141 games played. During the next season, 1982, Hansen continued playing with the Charleston Royals. He batted .282 with 78 runs, 148 hits, 34 doubles, 15 home runs and 94 runs batted in (RBIs) in 137 games played that season. He was second in the South Atlantic League in doubles that year. Hansen's 1983 season was split between the Class-A Fort Myers Royals and the Double-A Jacksonville Suns. With Fort Myers, he batted .282 with 51 runs, 109 hits, 13 doubles, one triple, two home runs and 62 RBIs in 107 games. In one game with the Suns, Hansen got one hit in four at-bats. Hansen spent his 1984 season at the Double-A level with the Memphis Chicks of the Southern League. In 93 games, Hansen batted .217 with 71 hits, 10 doubles and three home runs. He continued playing with the Memphis Chicks in 1985, but received a promotion to the Triple-A Omaha Royals late in the season. Hansen batted .324 with 68 hits, 10 doubles and two home runs in 66 games between the two teams. In 1986, Hansen spent the entire season with the Omaha Royals. He batted .253 with 49 hits, five doubles and four home runs in 73 games.

Before the 1987 season, Hansen joined the Seattle Mariners organization and was assigned to the Double-A Chattanooga Lookouts for the season. In 98 games, Hansen batted .281 with 94 hits, 12 doubles, one triple and five home runs. During the 1988 season, Hansen played at the Double-A and Triple-A level. With the Double-A Vermont Mariners, Hansen batted .301 with 31 hits, two doubles, one triple and one home run in 34 games. With the Triple-A Calgary Cannons, he batted .250 with 39 hits, six doubles, and two home runs in 51 games. During that season, Hansen's friend, Kurt Stillwell, compared Hansen to Crash Davis from the movie Bull Durham. The Mariners had demoted Hansen to Double-A to be roommates with future Hall of Famer Ken Griffey Jr.

Hansen spent his final season as a player in 1989 with the Double-A Williamsport Bills and Triple-A Calgary. In 122 combined games between the two teams, he batted .205 with 25 hits and five doubles.

== Coaching career ==
In 1990 and 1991, Hansen was a minor league instructor for the Seattle Mariners. In 1992, he was the team's bullpen coach. He was the youngest coach in the majors that year. The Mariners' team earned run average was 4.55 that season and the team went 64–98 positioning them seventh in the American League West. Hansen was fired at the end of the season along with the rest of the Mariners' coaching staff.

In 1996, Hansen was hired as the manager of the Class-A Short Season Everett AquaSox in the Mariners' organization. Hansen was hired as a roving catching instructor for the Orix BlueWave in Japan's Pacific League. He re-joined the Mariners' organization in 2002 as a coach with the AquaSox. Hansen managed the AquaSox for the last 28 games of the 2002 season. In 2003, he was named the Mariners' minor-league catching coordinator.

On August 10, 2010, the Mariners fired members of their coaching staff, including bench coach Ty Van Burkleo, and Hansen became the interim bench coach. He returned to the catching coordinator role to start 2011, and in September, he was named the Mariners' special assistant to the general manager. He held that role through 2020, when his contract was not renewed.

== Personal life ==
Hansen was born on August 28, 1961, in Johnstown, Pennsylvania. He resides in Stanwood, Washington with his wife and their two children.
