= New Hampshire Fisher Cats =

- Founded in 1994 in New Haven, Connecticut; Based in Manchester, New Hampshire since 2004

Team logo	Cap insignia

Minor league affiliations
- Class: Double-A (1994–present)
- League: Eastern League (1994–present)
- Division: Northeast Division

Major league affiliations
- Team: Toronto Blue Jays (2003–present)
- Previous teams: St. Louis Cardinals (2001–2002); Seattle Mariners (1999–2000); Colorado Rockies (1994–1998)

Minor league titles
- League titles (4): 2000; 2004; 2011; 2018
- Division titles (3): 2003; 2004; 2011

Team data
- Name: New Hampshire Fisher Cats (2004–present)
- Previous names: New Haven Ravens (1994–2003)
- Colors: Navy, red, gray, white
- Mascot: Fungo (2004–present); Slider (2006–present); Rally Raven (1994–2003); Ribbi Raven (1999–2003)
- Ballpark: Delta Dental Stadium (2005–present)
- Previous parks: Gill Stadium (2004); Yale Field (1994–2003)
- Owner/ Operator: Diamond Baseball Holdings
- General manager: Taylor Fisher
- Manager: John Tamargo
- Website: milb.com/new-hampshire

The New Hampshire Fisher Cats are a Minor League Baseball team based in Manchester, New Hampshire. The team, which plays in the Eastern League, is the Double-A affiliate of the Toronto Blue Jays of Major League Baseball (MLB).

During the team's first season in Manchester, the Fisher Cats played at Gill Stadium, a historic ballpark in a residential neighborhood. Starting with the 2005 season, the Fisher Cats have played at Delta Dental Stadium (originally known as Fisher Cats Ballpark, later as Merchantsauto.com Stadium, and then as Northeast Delta Dental Stadium), which is located in Manchester and has a capacity of 6,500.

The Fisher Cats won the Eastern League championship in 2004, their first season in New Hampshire after moving the franchise from New Haven, Connecticut (the franchise won one championship while playing as the New Haven Ravens). They next won the Eastern League championship in 2011, their first season wearing their current red, white, and blue team color scheme, and again in 2018. Overall, the franchise has won four Eastern League championships, three while based in New Hampshire.

== History ==
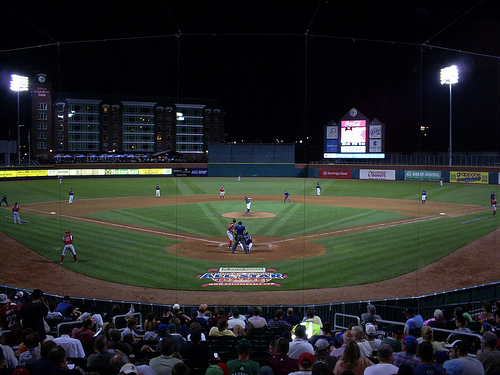
Northeast Delta Dental Stadium during the 2008 Eastern League All Star Game

On October 3, 1992, New Haven, Connecticut, along with Portland, Maine, were granted an expansion Double-A franchise. The new ballclub was named the New Haven Ravens in January 1993, the result of a contest sponsored by the New Haven Register, WELI and WTNH. The Ravens began play in the 1994 season affiliated with the Colorado Rockies. The team hosted the 1998 Double-A All-Star Game, was league runner-up in 1995 and 2003, and won the Eastern League Championship in 2000 with an 82–60 record, defeating the Reading Phillies 3 games to 1 in the championship series. The Ravens played in Yale Field.

The team was sold on January 27, 2003, to Lowell Spinners owner Drew Weber, with the intention of moving the franchise to Manchester, New Hampshire. The Eastern League baseball team owners voted to approve the move during the league playoffs later that same year on September 3. The team's first season in Manchester was 2004. The first season was played at Gill Stadium southeast of the downtown area while the current ballpark was under construction.

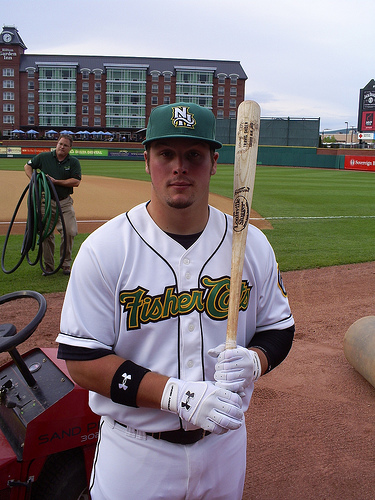
Travis Snider while playing for the New Hampshire Fisher Cats

On July 19, 2005, Drew Weber sold his controlling interest in the team. Art Solomon became the new controlling owner with 60% ownership while Weber retained a 40% ownership share. On July 12, 2008, Solomon purchased full ownership of the Fisher Cats from Weber.

Gary Cathcart was named the team's new manager on December 3, 2007; Cathcart had served as the Fisher Cats' hitting coach during 2005 and 2006, and had most recently managed the single-A Lansing Lugnuts.

On July 16, 2008, the team hosted the 2008 Eastern League All-Star Game and Home Run Derby between the Northern Division and Southern Division. Travis Snider of the Fisher Cats won the Home Run Derby over Luis Montanez of the Bowie Baysox 7–6. In the All-Star Game itself, the Northern Division defeated the Southern Division 5–3 before a Northeast Delta Dental Stadium record crowd of 8,762.

On May 21, 2012, three Fisher Cats pitchers combined to throw the third no-hitter in franchise history, stifling the Portland Sea Dogs in a 6–0 victory at New Hampshire. Combining on the gem for the team were Brett Cecil (5 2/3 innings), Danny Farquhar (2 1/3), and Ronald Uviedo (1). It was the first no-hitter for New Hampshire since Kyle Drabek hurled a complete-game, nine-inning no-hitter against the New Britain Rock Cats on July 4, 2010.

In conjunction with Major League Baseball's restructuring of Minor League Baseball in 2021, the Fisher Cats were organized into the Double-A Northeast. In 2022, the Double-A Northeast became known as the Eastern League, the name historically used by the regional circuit prior to the 2021 reorganization.

== Origin of current team name ==
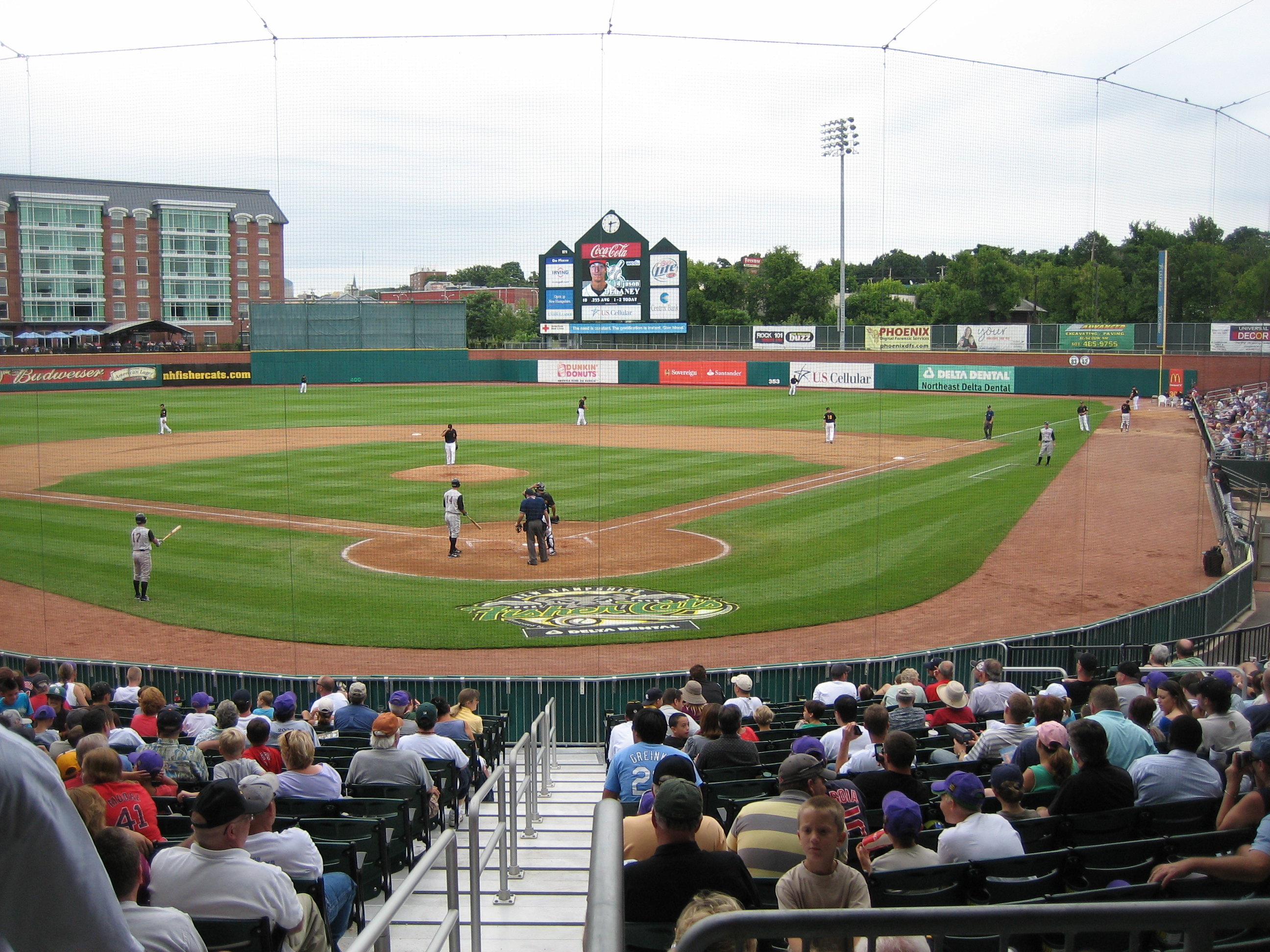
View on field

On November 6, 2003, the new management unveiled the New Hampshire Primaries name and logo, which featured an elephant and a donkey holding baseball bats, and was to be used starting in the 2004 season. The management stated that they felt it reflected a unique aspect of the state, since the New Hampshire primary, held every four years, signifies the start of the presidential election process. Immediately, the name and logo were widely criticized. An online petition was created by two local baseball fans asking the team ownership to reconsider their decision and was covered by local newspapers, radio, and television stations. This coverage was led by a front-page article in the New Hampshire Union Leader, New Hampshire's largest newspaper, on Sunday November 9, 2003. By the afternoon of November 10, over 1200 unique visitors had signed the petition. Later in the day, the team announced that they would not use the Primaries name after all and that they would seek public opinion on a new name.

On November 13, 2003, the team announced the "Name the Team" contest which had three phases over the following weeks. During the first phase, fans submitted suggestions. During the second phase, fans ranked their top five favorite names from the suggestions. For the final phase, fans voted for their single favorite among the top five names from the second round. On December 3, the final voting results were announced: New Hampshire Fisher Cats (1,574 votes – 24.5%), Manchester Millers (1,552 votes – 24.1%), Granite State Mountain Men (1,382 votes – 21.5%), New Hampshire Granite (1,302 votes – 20.2%), and New Hampshire Primaries (627 votes – 9.7%). The ultimate source of the name is the fisher, often called a fisher cat in New Hampshire. On January 22, 2004, the team unveiled the new set of logos that would be used for the name New Hampshire Fisher Cats. All of the team's logos and fonts were created and designed by Studio Simon of Louisville, Kentucky. Team colors were green, black, silver, and bronze.

On August 25, 2007, the Fisher Cats held a "turn back the clock" promotion and played as the New Hampshire Primaries against the Portland Sea Dogs. The Primaries wore specially designed game worn jerseys for the game. This event would be repeated on July 4, 2008, for a game against the Trenton Thunder, and on July 4, 2009.

On November 28, 2007, the team unveiled a new logo, uniforms, and team colors that were designed by Rickabaugh Graphics of Gahanna, Ohio. The official colors were emerald green, black, white, and silver.

On November 16, 2010, the team colors were changed to red, white and blue, with no other major changes to the logo and uniforms.

In 2021, Manchester's minor league baseball team announced it will briefly change its name from the New Hampshire Fisher Cats to the Manchester Chicken Tenders, referencing the city's role as the birthplace of the chicken tender.

In December 2023, the team was purchased by Diamond Baseball Holdings.

== Season-by-season ==
These statistics are current through the 2026 season.

League champions †	Finals appearance *	Division winner ^	Wild card berth ¤

Season	League	Division	Finish	Wins	Losses	Win%	GB	Postseason	Manager
New Haven Ravens
1994	EL	North	2nd ¤	77	63	.550	4.5	Lost semifinals (Binghamton) 0–3	Paul Zuvella
1995	EL	North	2nd ¤	79	63	.556	7	Won semifinals (Portland) 3–1; Lost finals (Reading) 2–3 *	Paul Zuvella
1996	EL	North	4th	66	75	.468	17		Bill Hayes
1997	EL	North	5th	64	78	.451	15		Bill Hayes
1998	EL	North	5th	59	83	.415	24		Tim Blackwell
1999	EL	North	4th	65	77	.458	27		Dan Rohn
2000	EL	North	2nd ¤	82	60	.577	1	Won semifinals (Binghamton) 3–1; Won finals (Reading) 3–1 †	Dan Rohn
2001	EL	North	6th	47	95	.331	40		Danny Sheaffer
2002	EL	North	2nd ¤	74	65	.532	1.5	Lost semifinals (Norwich) 0–3	Mark DeJohn
2003	EL	North	1st ^	79	63	.556	—	Won semifinals (New Britain) 3–2; Lost finals (Akron) 0–3 *	Marty Pevey
New Hampshire Fisher Cats
2004	EL	North	1st ^	84	57	.596	—	Won semifinals (Binghamton) 3–1; Won finals (Altoona) 3–0 †	Mike Basso
2005	EL	North	5th	68	74	.479	8		Mike Basso
2006	EL	North	4th	68	73	.482	11.5		Doug Davis
2007	EL	North	3rd	70	73	.490	13.5		Bill Masse
2008	EL	North	6th	61	81	.430	26		Gary Cathcart
2009	EL	North	5th	64	78	.451	19		Gary Cathcart
2010	EL	East	2nd ¤	79	62	.560	3.5	Lost semifinals (Trenton) 0–3	Luis Rivera
2011	EL	East	1st ^	77	65	.542	—	Won semifinals (Reading) 3–1; Won finals (Richmond) 3–1 †	Sal Fasano
2012	EL	East	6th	61	81	.430	18		Sal Fasano
2013	EL	East	3rd	68	72	.486	17.5		Gary Allenson
2014	EL	East	5th	66	76	.465	22		Bobby Meacham
2015	EL	East	5th	69	71	.493	10.5		Bobby Meacham
2016	EL	East	4th	69	73	.486	20.5		Bobby Meacham
2017	EL	East	4th	59	80	.424	32.5		Gary Allenson
2018	EL	East	2nd ¤	76	62	.551	2	Won semifinals (Trenton) 3–0; Won finals (Akron) 3–0 †	John Schneider
2019	EL	East	5th	63	76	.453	17		Mike Mordecai
2021	AANE	Northeast	3rd	52	55	.486	14		Cesar Martin
2022	EL	Northeast	5th	59	79	.428	25		Cesar Martin
2023	EL	Northeast	4th	62	72	.463	20.5		Cesar Martin
2024	EL	Northeast	6th	52	84	.382	25.0		Cesar Martin
2025	EL	Northeast	5th	56	81	.409	34.5		Brent Lavallee
2026	EL	Northeast	6th	59	75	.440	13.0		John Tamargo

Statistic	Wins	Losses	Win %
Regular season record (1994–2026)	2,197	2,398	.478
Postseason record (1994–2026)	32	23	.582
All-time regular and postseason record	2,229	2,346	.479

== Roster ==
New Hampshire Fisher Cats roster
Players	Coaches/Other
Pitchers: 18 Alex Amalfi; 4 T. J. Brock; 10 Austin Cates; 4 Devereaux Harrison; 17 Johnny King; 12 Aaron Munson; 22 Angel Obando; 16 Mason Olson; 37 Fernando Pérez; 26 Nolan Perry; 24 Kelena Sauer; 1 Danny Thompson Jr.; 31 Jonathan Todd; 41 Jackson Wentworth; Catchers: 15 Renyel Campos; 25 Edward Duran; 20 Aaron Parker; 30 Geovany Planchart; Infielders: 3 Cutter Coffey; 9 J.R. Freethy; 6 Dub Gleed; 21 Josh Rivera; 7 Eric Snow; 8 Tucker Toman; 44 Peyton Williams; Outfielders: 2 Victor Arias; 14 Carter Cunningham; 19 Alexis Hernandez; 15 Hedbert Perez; 5 Adrian Pinto; 11 Mathieu Vallee	Manager: 28 John Tamargo Jr.; Coaches: -- Robelin Bautista (assistant pitching); -- Austin Bibens-Dirkx (pitching); -- Mitch Huckabay (hitting); 35 Mike McRae (bench); 23 Luis Silva (coach); 60-day injured list: 8 Jace Bohrofen; 13 Jacob Sharp; -- Ryan Watson; -- Chay Yeager (full season); 7-day injured list; * On Toronto Blue Jays 40-man roster; ~ Development list; # Rehab assignment; ∞ Reserve list; ‡ Restricted list; § Suspended list; † Temporarily inactive list; Roster updated September 8, 2026; Transactions; → More rosters: MiLB • Eastern League; → Toronto Blue Jays minor league players

== See also ==
- Professional baseball in Connecticut (for New Haven Ravens)
