= Jacob Parker (baseball) =

American baseball player (born 2006)

Mississippi State Bulldogs
- Outfielder
- Born: August 8, 2006 (age 19); Hattiesburg, Mississippi, U.S.
- Bats: Left Throws: Right

Jacob Williams Parker (born August 8, 2006) is an American college baseball outfielder for the Mississippi State Bulldogs.

== Career ==
Parker attended Purvis High School in Purvis, Mississippi, where he played baseball with his twin brother, JoJo Parker. During his high school career he had 205 hits and 42 home runs. In 2024, he competed in the All-Star High School Home Run Derby at Globe Life Field. As a senior in 2025, he shared the Class 4A's Mr. Baseball Award with his brother JoJo after hitting .515 with 17 home runs, 52 runs batted in (RBI) and 39 stolen bases. Parker committed to Mississippi State University to play college baseball. He was selected by the Arizona Diamondbacks in the 19th round of the 2025 Major League Baseball draft, but did not sign and played at Mississippi State.

Parker was a starter his freshman year at Mississippi State in 2026.

== Personal life ==
His twin brother, JoJo Parker, plays in the Toronto Blue Jays organization.
