= List of Northwest League champions =

The Northwest League of Minor League Baseball is one of three High-A baseball leagues in the United States and notably the only league with a team in Canada. A league champion is determined at the end of each season. Champions have been determined by postseason playoffs, winning the regular season pennant, or being declared champion by the league office. As of 2022, the first- and second-half winners meet in a best-of-five series to determine a league champion. If the same team wins both halves, the team with the next best full-season winning percentage will qualify.

== League champions ==
Score and finalist information is only presented when postseason play occurred. The lack of this information indicates a declared league champion.

Year	Champion	Score	Finalist
1955	Eugene Emeralds	4–2	Salem Senators
1956	Yakima Bears	—	—
1957	Wenatchee Chiefs	4–3	Eugene Emeralds
1958	Yakima Bears	4–1	Lewiston Broncs
1959	Yakima Bears	4–1	Salem Senators
1960	Yakima Bears	—	—
1961	Lewiston Broncs	4–1	Yakima Bears
1962	Wenatchee Chiefs	4–2	Tri-City Braves
1963	Yakima Bears	3–1	Lewiston Broncs
1964	Yakima Bears	3–0	Eugene Emeralds
1965	Tri-City Atoms	3–0	Lewiston Broncs
1966	Tri-City Atoms	—	—
1967	Medford Giants	—	—
1968	Tri-City Atoms	—	—
1969	Rogue Valley Dodgers	—	—
1970	Lewiston Broncs	—	—
1971	Tri-City Padres	—	—
1972	Lewiston Broncs	—	—
1973	Walla Walla Padres	—	—
1974	Eugene Emeralds	2–1	Bellingham Dodgers
1975	Eugene Emeralds	2–0	Portland Mavericks
1976	Walla Walla Padres	2–1	Portland Mavericks
1977	Bellingham Mariners	2–1	Portland Mavericks
1978	Grays Harbor Loggers	1–0	Eugene Emeralds
1979	Central Oregon Phillies	2–1	Walla Walla Padres
1980^{[a]}	Bellingham Mariners; Eugene Emeralds	1–1	—
1981	Medford Athletics	2–1	Bellingham Mariners
1982	Salem Angels	2–0	Medford Athletics
1983	Medford Athletics	2–0	Bellingham Mariners
1984	Tri-Cities Triplets	1–0	Medford Athletics
1985	Everett Giants	1–0	Eugene Emeralds
1986	Bellingham Mariners	1–0	Eugene Emeralds
1987	Spokane Indians	2–1	Everett Giants
1988	Spokane Indians	2–1	Southern Oregon Athletics
1989	Spokane Indians	2–1	Southern Oregon Athletics
1990	Spokane Indians	2–1	Boise Hawks
1991	Boise Hawks	2–0	Yakima Bears
1992	Bellingham Mariners	2–0	Bend Rockies
1993	Boise Hawks	2–0	Bellingham Mariners
1994	Boise Hawks	2–1	Yakima Bears
1995	Boise Hawks	2–1	Bellingham Giants
1996	Yakima Bears	2–0	Eugene Emeralds
1997	Portland Rockies	3–2	Boise Hawks
1998	Salem-Keizer Volcanoes	3–0	Boise Hawks
1999	Spokane Indians	3–0	Portland Rockies
2000	Yakima Bears	3–2	Eugene Emeralds
2001	Salem-Keizer Volcanoes	3–0	Boise Hawks
2002	Boise Hawks	3–0	Everett AquaSox
2003	Spokane Indians	3–0	Salem-Keizer Volcanoes
2004	Boise Hawks	3–0	Vancouver Canadians
2005	Spokane Indians	3–2	Vancouver Canadians
2006	Salem-Keizer Volcanoes	3–1	Boise Hawks
2007	Salem-Keizer Volcanoes	3–1	Tri-City Dust Devils
2008	Spokane Indians	3–1	Salem-Keizer Volcanoes
2009	Salem-Keizer Volcanoes	3–1	Tri-City Dust Devils
2010	Everett AquaSox	2–1	Spokane Indians
2011	Vancouver Canadians	2–1	Tri-City Dust Devils
2012	Vancouver Canadians	2–1	Boise Hawks
2013	Vancouver Canadians	2–1	Boise Hawks
2014	Hillsboro Hops	2–0	Vancouver Canadians
2015	Hillsboro Hops	2–1	Tri-City Dust Devils
2016	Eugene Emeralds	2–1	Everett AquaSox
2017	Vancouver Canadians	3–1	Eugene Emeralds
2018	Eugene Emeralds	3–0	Spokane Indians
2019	Hillsboro Hops	3–2	Tri-City Dust Devils
2020	None (season cancelled due to COVID-19 pandemic)		
2021	Eugene Emeralds	3–1	Spokane Indians
2022	Eugene Emeralds	3–0	Vancouver Canadians
2023	Vancouver Canadians	3–1	Everett AquaSox
2024^{[b]}	Spokane Indians	3–1	Vancouver Canadians
2025	Everett AquaSox	3–1	Eugene Emeralds
2026	Vancouver Canadians	3–0	Eugene Emeralds

== Championship wins by team ==
Active Northwest League teams appear in bold.

Wins	Team	Championship years
9	**Spokane Indians**	1987, 1988, 1989, 1990, 1999, 2003, 2005, 2008, 2024
8	**Eugene Emeralds**	1955, 1974, 1975, 1980, 2016, 2018, 2021, 2022
8	Yakima Bears	1956, 1958, 1959, 1960, 1963, 1964, 1996, 2000
6	Boise Hawks	1991, 1993, 1994, 1995, 2002, 2004
6	**Vancouver Canadians**	2011, 2012, 2013, 2017, 2023, 2026
5	Salem-Keizer Volcanoes	1998, 2001, 2006, 2007, 2009
5	Tri-City Atoms/Padres/Tri-Cities Triplets	1965, 1966, 1968, 1971, 1984
4	Bellingham Mariners	1977, 1980, 1986, 1992
4	Lewiston Broncs	1961, 1970, 1972, 1973
3	**Everett Giants/AquaSox**	1985, 2010, 2025
3	**Hillsboro Hops**	2014, 2015, 2019
2	Medford Athletics	1981, 1983
2	Wenatchee Chiefs	1957, 1962
1	Central Oregon Phillies	1979
1	Grays Harbor Loggers	1978
1	Medford Giants	1967
1	Portland Rockies	1997
1	Rogue Valley Dodgers	1969
1	Salem Angels	1982
1	Walla Walla Padres	1976

== Notes ==
- ^{a} Bellingham and Eugene were declared co-champions.
- ^{b} Spokane had the best league record in both the first and second halves of the season. Vancouver was named Spokane's opponent in the 2024 championship series by virtue of having the second-best full-season record.
