= Curtis Washington Jr. =

American baseball player (born 2000)

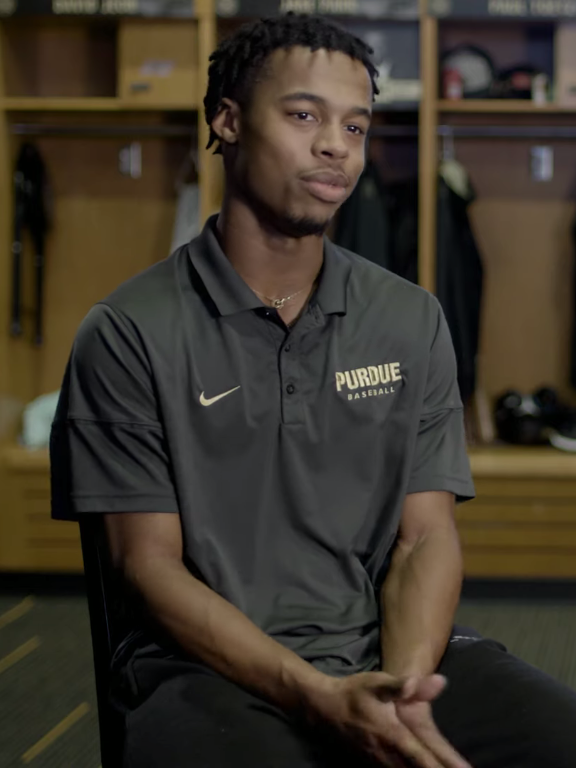
- Washington with Purdue in 2022

Seattle Mariners
- Outfielder
- Born: May 22, 2000 (age 26); West Memphis, Arkansas, U.S.
- Bats: Right Throws: Right

Curtis Washington Jr. (born May 22, 2000) is an American professional baseball outfielder in the Seattle Mariners organization. He is currently a phantom ballplayer, having spent one day on the Mariners' active roster without appearing in a game.

== Career ==
Washington grew up in his hometown of West Memphis, Arkansas and played college baseball at the University of Arkansas. After spending two years at Arkansas, he transferred to Wabash Valley College and helped the WVC Warriors to a 53-5 record, he was also named the MVP of the NJCCA Region 24 Tournament. He then later transferred to Purdue University.

Washington was drafted by the Seattle Mariners in the 19th round of the 2022 Major League Baseball draft. He later signed a bonus up to $50,000. Washington made his professional debut later in 2022 with the ACL Mariners. In 2023, He was assigned to the Modesto Nuts. Washington spent most of the 2024 with the Nuts before being promoted to the Everett AquaSox, and later would have a brief stint with the Tacoma Rainiers. He became a breakout player during the 2025 season, recording a combined total of .456/.639/1.312 with both Modesto & Everett. In May of that season, Washington was named the California League player of the week and also hit a cycle.

On June 16, 2026, Washington was selected to the 40-man roster and promoted to the major leagues for the first time. He was called up from the nearby Everett AquaSox, because the team could not promptly promote a more experienced player from the Tacoma Rainiers, who were on a road trip. Washington did not play in that night's game. A day later, Washington was optioned back to High-A Everett. On June 20, Washington was removed from the 40–man roster and reassigned to High-A Everett.
