= Luke Stevenson =

American baseball player (born 2004)

Seattle Mariners
- Catcher
- Born: July 22, 2004 (age 22); Flemington, New Jersey, U.S.
- Bats: Left Throws: Right
- Stats at Baseball Reference

Luke Patrick Stevenson (born July 22, 2004) is an American professional baseball catcher in the Seattle Mariners organization.

== Amateur career ==
Stevenson attended Wake Forest High School in Wake Forest, North Carolina, where he played baseball. As a senior in 2023, he batted .512 with 17 home runs and 58 RBI in 33 games. Unselected in the 2023 Major League Baseball draft, he fulfilled his commitment to play college baseball at the University of North Carolina-Chapel Hill for the Tar Heels.

As a freshman for North Carolina in 2024, Stevenson started 63 games as catcher and hit .284 with 14 home runs and 58 RBI, alongside leading the team in walks drawn. He underwent knee surgery in the offseason and did not participate in the fall season. Stevenson opened the 2025 season as a top prospect for the upcoming MLB draft. Over 61 games, Stevenson hit .251 with 19 home runs and 58 RBI.

== Professional career ==
Stevenson was selected by the Seattle Mariners with the 35th overall selection of the 2025 Major League Baseball draft. On July 19, 2025, Stevenson signed with the Mariners for a $2.8 million signing bonus.

Stevenson made his professional debut after signing with the Single-A Modesto Nuts. Over 22 games, he hit .280 with one home run and 14 RBIs. Stevenson was assigned to the High-A Everett AquaSox for the 2026 season. He played in 103 games and batted .243 with 22 home runs and 83 RBIs.
