= JoJo Parker =

American baseball player (born 2006)

Toronto Blue Jays
- Shortstop
- Born: August 8, 2006 (age 19); Hattiesburg, Mississippi, U.S.
- Bats: Left Throws: Right
- Stats at Baseball Reference

Joseph Paul Parker Jr. (born August 8, 2006) is an American professional baseball shortstop in the Toronto Blue Jays organization. He was drafted 8th overall by the Blue Jays in the 2025 MLB draft. He is the 43rd ranked prospect in baseball, and the Blue Jays 1st ranked prospect per Major League Baseball's 2026 prospect rankings.

== Amateur career ==
Parker attended Purvis High School in Purvis, Mississippi, where he played baseball with his twin brother Jacob. He played shortstop, as well as pitcher. As a sophomore in 2023, he hit a sacrifice fly in the bottom of the 10th inning of the MHSAA 4A title game. As a junior in 2024, he hit .464 with seven home runs, 28 runs batted in (RBI) and 28 stolen bases and also had 66 strikeouts as a pitcher. As a senior in 2025, Parker shared the Class 4A's Mr. Baseball Award with his brother Jacob.

Joseph "JoJo" Parker was ranked the 8th best player in the country by Perfect Game Baseball, while also being the number one player in Mississippi. Parker was a top prospect for the 2025 Major League Baseball draft. He is committed to play college baseball at Mississippi State University.

== Professional career ==
Parker was drafted by the Toronto Blue Jays with the eighth overall selection of the 2025 Major League Baseball draft. He signed with the Blue Jays for a $6.2 million signing bonus on July 18, 2025.

== Personal life ==
His twin brother, Jacob, plays college baseball for the Mississippi State Bulldogs.
