= Christian Little =

American baseball player (born 2003)

Seattle Mariners
- Pitcher
- Born: July 5, 2003 (age 23); St. Louis, Missouri, U.S.
- Bats: Right Throws: Right

Christian Xavier Little (born July 5, 2003) is an American professional baseball pitcher in the Seattle Mariners organization. He played college baseball for the Vanderbilt Commodores and LSU Tigers.

== Amateur career ==
Little was born and grew up in St. Louis, Missouri, and attended Christian Brothers College High School. He committed to play college baseball at Vanderbilt when he was 14 years old. As a junior, Little was named the Missouri Gatorade Player of the Year after posting a 6–1 record with a 1.88 ERA and 58 strikeouts. Little completed his high school coursework over the following summer in order to enroll at Vanderbilt early.

Little made 11 starts during his freshman season and went 3–2 with a 5.48 ERA and 49 strikeouts. At 17 years old, he became the youngest pitcher to start a Southeastern Conference (SEC) game. Little later became the youngest player to start a College World Series game. As a sophomore, Little pitched mostly in relief and had a 3.72 ERA and 46 strikeouts in 38 2/3 innings pitched over 18 appearances. He entered the NCAA transfer portal after the end of the season.

Little ultimately committed to transfer to Louisiana State. During the summer prior to his junior season, he played collegiate summer baseball with the Cotuit Kettleers of the Cape Cod Baseball League.

== Professional career ==
In the 2023 Major League Baseball draft, Little was selected by the New York Mets in the 19th round, but didn't sign and played another year at LSU. The next year, Little was selected in the 11th round, with the 333rd overall pick, by the Seattle Mariners in the 2024 Major League Baseball draft. On July 22, 2024, Little signed with the Mariners for $200,000.
