= Walter Ford (baseball) =

American baseball player (born 2004)

Seattle Mariners
- Pitcher
- Born: December 28, 2004 (age 21); Pensacola, Florida
- Bats: Right Throws: Right

Walter Bryant Ford (born December 28, 2004) is an American professional baseball pitcher in the Seattle Mariners organization.

== Amateur career ==
Ford grew up in Bessemer, Alabama, but began his high school career at Pace High School in Pace, Florida before transferring to Hoover High School in Hoover, Alabama for his sophomore season in 2021. For the season, he pitched 29 2/3 innings and compiled a 1.85 ERA. He spent that summer competing with USA Baseball on their 18U National Team. Originally set to graduate in 2023, he reclassified to the class of 2022 in September 2021. He also transferred back to Pace for his senior year. He entered his senior season as one of the top prospects for the upcoming draft, alongside being the youngest player eligible. He helped lead Pace to the 6A state championship, where they fell 5-4. He ended the season 10-2 with a 1.00 ERA, 126 strikeouts, and thirty walks over 70 1/3 innings. He was named the 6A Player of the Year and earned All-State honors. Ford committed to play college baseball for the Alabama Crimson Tide.

== Professional career ==
Ford was selected by the Seattle Mariners with the 74th overall selection of the 2022 Major League Baseball draft. He signed with the team for $1.25 million.

Ford did not pitch professionally in 2022. He pitched in nine games for the rookie-league Arizona Complex League Mariners in 2023 and posted a 3.57 ERA. He returned to Arizona in 2024, pitching in 12 games, before he was promoted to the Class-A Modesto Nuts in late July. Over twenty games (16 starts) between the two teams, Ford went 4-4 with a 5.18 ERA and 74 strikeouts over eighty innings. He returned to Modesto for the 2025 season. Ford started 23 games, going 5-5 with a 4.67 ERA and 95 strikeouts across 125 1/3 innings. In 2026, he started 22 games with the High-A Everett AquaSox and went 0-13 with a 7.92 ERA and 62 strikeouts over 102 1/3 innings.
