= List of Eastern League team rosters =

Each of the 12 teams of Minor League Baseball's Eastern League carry a 28-man active roster. Only these players are eligible to play.

Teams may have any number of inactive players on their rosters at a given time who do not count toward active roster limits. Injured players may be placed on the injured list (7-day or 60-day). The temporary inactive list and bereavement list are for players attending to personal matters. Major league players may be placed on rosters for injury rehabilitation for a maximum of 20 days for non-pitchers and 30 days for pitchers.

Players who are ineligible to play due to failure to adhere to the Minor League Drug Prevention and Treatment Program, violations of their contract, who are receiving team disciplinary action, or who are unable to join the team due to visa problems may be placed on the restricted or suspended lists. These players count against a team's active roster limit.

Each team usually has a three-man coaching staff including a manager, hitting coach, and pitching coach. Depending on each Major League Baseball organization's development approach, some teams may have additional coaches.

== Northeast Division ==
=== Binghamton Mets ===
Binghamton Rumble Ponies roster
Players	Coaches/Other
Pitchers: 4 Felipe De La Cruz; 19 Saul Garcia; 3 Jordan Geber; 35 Brendan Girton; -- R.J. Gordon; 24 Kevin Gowdy; 27 Brian Metoyer; 45 Douglas Orellana; 15 Zach Peek; 28 Gabriel Rodriguez; 21 Jonathan Santucci; 12 Ben Simon; 33 Joander Suarez; 22 Zach Thonton; 26 Matt Turner; 17 Will Watson; 10 Jefry Yan; Catchers: 1 Kevin Parada; 11 Chris Suero; Infielders: 34 Nick Lorusso; 23 Jacob Reimer; 14 JT Schwartz; 13 Marco Vargas; 2 Wyatt Young; Outfielders: 7 A. J. Ewing; 31 José Ramos; 8 Matt Rudick; 16 Eli Serrano III; 6 D'Andre Smith	Manager: 18 Michael Collins; Coaches: 32 Matt Carasiti (pitcher); 25 Mariano Duncan (bench); 5 Rachel Folden (hitting); 9 Jake Hager (assistant hitting/infield); 60-day injured list: -- Tyler Burch; -- Joshua Cornielly (full season); 7-day injured list; * On New York Mets 40-man roster; ~ Development list; # Rehab assignment; ∞ Reserve list; ‡ Restricted list; § Suspended list; † Temporarily inactive list; Roster updated April 12, 2026; Transactions; → More rosters: MiLB • Eastern League; → New York Mets minor league players

=== Hartford Yard Goats ===
Hartford Yard Goats roster
Players	Coaches/Other
Pitchers: 31 Blake Adams; 32 Jake Brooks; 39 Eiberson Castellano; 36 Cade Denton; 25 Konner Eaton; 53 Victor Juarez; 23 Jack Mahoney; 14 Alberto Pacheco; 24 Davison Palermo; 13 Michael Prosecky; 35 Evan Shawver; 55 Austin Smith; 16 Connor Staine; 18 Carlos Torres; 51 Fidel Ulloa; 22 Sam Weatherly; Catchers: 19 Bryant Betancourt; 2 Cole Messina; 45 Jimmy Obertop; Infielders: 4 GJ Hill; 1 Dyan Jorge; 15 Aidan Longwell; 27 Skyler Messinger; 7 Andy Perez; 1 Roc Riggio; 10 Jose Torres; 8 Braylen Wimmer; Outfielders: 54 Connor Capel; 6 Zach Kokoska; 26 Benny Montgomery	Manager: 46 Robinson Cancel; Coaches: 5 Zach Osborne (hitting); 12 Michael Ryan (bench); 30 Jerry Sullivan (pitching); 60-day injured list: 55 Ben Shields; -- Case Williams; 7-day injured list; * On Colorado Rockies 40-man roster; ~ Development list; # Rehab assignment; ∞ Reserve list; ‡ Restricted list; § Suspended list; † Temporarily inactive list; Roster updated April 16, 2026; Transactions; → More rosters: MiLB • Eastern League; → Colorado Rockies minor league players

=== New Hampshire Fisher Cats ===
New Hampshire Fisher Cats roster
Players	Coaches/Other
Pitchers: 18 Alex Amalfi; 4 Irv Carter; 33 Javen Coleman; 40 Caleb Freeman; 44 Richard Gallardo; 14 Nate Garkow; 25 Conor Larkin; 13 Austin Marozas; 36 Chris McElvain; 16 Mason Olson; 37 Fernando Pérez; 27 Kai Peterson; -- Yondrei Rojas; -- Rafael Sanchez; 21 Gage Stanifer; 30 Geison Urbaez; 41 Jackson Wentworth; Catchers: 31 Jackson Hornung; 20 Aaron Parker; 22 Geovany Planchart; 26 Alex Stone; Infielders: 3 Cutter Coffey; 7 Cade Doughty; 9 Nick Goodwin; 6 Jay Harry; 15 Sean Keys; Outfielders: -- Victor Arias; 8 Jace Bohrofen; 32 Jorge Burgos; 19 Eddie Micheletti Jr.; 1 Ismael Munguia; -- Hedbert Perez	Manager: 28 John Tamargo Jr.; Coaches: -- Robelin Bautista (assistant pitching); -- Austin Bibens-Dirkx (pitching); -- Mitch Huckabay (hitting); 35 Mike McRae (bench); 23 Luis Silva (coach); 60-day injured list: -- T. J. Brock; -- Ryan Watson; -- Chay Yeager (full season); 7-day injured list; * On Toronto Blue Jays 40-man roster; ~ Development list; # Rehab assignment; ∞ Reserve list; ‡ Restricted list; § Suspended list; † Temporarily inactive list; Roster updated April 16, 2026; Transactions; → More rosters: MiLB • Eastern League; → Toronto Blue Jays minor league players

=== Portland Sea Dogs ===
Portland Sea Dogs roster
Players	Coaches/Other
Pitchers: 35 Cooper Adams; 33 Jay Allmer; 23 Caleb Bolden; 32 Max Carlson; 19 Cade Feeney; 29 Patrick Halligan; 21 John Holobetz; 30 Jorge Juan; -- Danny Kirwin; 47 Hayden Mullins; 24 Jedixson Páez; 49 Eduardo Rivera; 20 Erik Rivera; 15 Dalton Rogers; 36 Joe Vogatsky; 44 Blake Wehunt; -- Jeremy Wu-Yelland; 48 Gage Ziehl; Catchers: 12 Nate Baez; -- Brooks Brannon; 17 Raudelis Martinez; 25 Ronald Rosario; Infielders: 52 Marvin Alcantara; 50 Franklin Arias; 22 Drew Ehrhard; 10 Max Ferguson; 51 Ahbram Liendo; 13 Tyler McDonough; Outfielders: 2 Miguel Bleis; 7 Caden Rose; 3 Nelly Taylor; 5 Will Turner	Manager: 55 Chad Epperson; Coaches: 53 Elijah Boyer (assistant hitting); 88 Trevor Burmeister (hitting); 77 Isaiah Page (assistant pitching); 66 Juan Rivera (pitching); 54 Kyle Sasala (coach); 60-day injured list: -- Liu Chih-jung; -- Yordanny Monegro; 7-day injured list; * On Boston Red Sox 40-man roster; ~ Development list; # Rehab assignment; ∞ Reserve list; ‡ Restricted list; § Suspended list; † Temporarily inactive list; Roster updated April 18, 2026; Transactions; → More rosters: MiLB • Eastern League; → Boston Red Sox minor league players

=== Reading Phillies ===
Reading Fightin Phils roster
Players	Coaches/Other
Pitchers: 58 Andrew Baker; 30 Gabriel Barbosa; 39 Kyle Brnovich; 57 Jack Dallas; 44 Tristan Garnett; 19 Evan Gates; -- Estibenzon Jimenez; 22 Chuck King; 47 Alex McFarlane; -- Christian McGowan; -- Wesley Moore; -- Mitch Neunborn; -- Wen-Hui Pan; 28 Luke Russo; 25 Adam Seminaris; 49 Levi Stoudt; 46 Saul Teran; 41 Lenny Torres Jr.; 29 Cristhian Tortosa; 38 Braydon Tucker; 31 Zack Wheeler #; Catchers: -- Lou Albrecht; 3 Jordan Dissin; 7 Kehden Hettiger; 27 Guillermo Rosario; Infielders: 18 Alex Binelas; 5 Carson DeMartini; 10 Aroon Escobar; 4 Bryan Rincon; 16 Bryson Ware; Outfielders: 8 Dylan Campbell; 12 Cade Fergus; 23 Raylin Heredia; 0 Austin Murr; 6 Dante Nori	Manager: 13 Al Pedrique; Coaches: 35 Brad Bergesen (pitching); 43 Alex Harter (assistant pitching); 40 Jeff Livesey (hitting); 2 Marty Malloy (bench); 11 Nerluis Martinez (coach); 60-day injured list: -- Braeden Fausnaught; 7-day injured list; * On Philadelphia Phillies 40-man roster; ~ Development list; # Rehab assignment; ∞ Reserve list; ‡ Restricted list; § Suspended list; † Temporarily inactive list; Roster updated April 17, 2026; Transactions; → More rosters: MiLB • Eastern League; → Philadelphia Phillies minor league players

=== Somerset Patriots ===
Somerset Patriots roster
Players	Coaches/Other
Pitchers: 31 Michael Arias; 19 Kelly Austin; 27 Will Brian; 11 Kyle Carr; 16 Chase Chaney; 45 Gerrit Cole #; 44 Bailey Dees; 20 Geoffrey Gilbert; -- Chase Hampton *; 26 Ben Hess; 22 Chris Kean; 7 Matt Keating; 37 Hayden Merda; 18 Eric Reyzelman; 33 Xavier Rivas; -- Yerry Rodríguez; -- Wilmy Sanchez; 29 Trent Sellers; 15 Cade Smith; -- Kevin Stevens; Catchers: -- Tomas Frick; -- Abrahan Gutierrez; 21 Diomedes Hernandez ~; 17 Manuel Palencia; 12 Miguel Palma; Infielders: 5 Owen Cobb; 36 Tyler Hardman; 3 George Lombard Jr.; 7 Anthony Volpe #; Outfielders: 1 Jace Avina; -- Jackson Castillo; 2 Kenedy Corona; 25 DJ Gladney; 8 Marco Luciano; 30 Garrett Martin; 13 Coby Morales; 10 Nicholas Torres	Manager: 24 James Cooper; Coaches: 50 Michael Fransoso (hitting); 14 Caleb Hamilton (defensive); 40 Demetre Kokoris (pitching); 8 Uziel Viloria (defense); 60-day injured list: -- Hueston Morrill; 24 Brock Selvidge (full season); -- Luis Velasquez; 7-day injured list; * On New York Yankees 40-man roster; ~ Development list; # Rehab assignment; ∞ Reserve list; ‡ Restricted list; § Suspended list; † Temporarily inactive list; Roster updated April 20, 2026; Transactions; → More rosters: MiLB • Eastern League; → New York Yankees minor league players

== Southwest Division ==
=== Akron RubberDucks ===
Akron RubberDucks roster
Players	Coaches/Other
Pitchers: 29 Alaska Abney; 31 Jack Carey; 22 Dylan DeLucia; 40 Jay Driver; 34 Magnus Ellerts; 38 Caden Favors; 28 Josh Hartle; 30 Matt Jachec; 16 Jack Jasiak; 44 Reid Johnston; 32 Zane Morehouse; 37 Carter Rustad; 12 Hunter Stanley; 41 Khal Stephen; 36 Adam Tulloch; 53 Matt Wilkinson; Catchers: 13 Cameron Barstad; 17 Jacob Cozart; Infielders: 10 José Devers; 7 Ángel Genao *; 6 Christian Knapczyk; 2 Alex Mooney; -- Tyresse Turner; 24 Ralphy Velazquez; Outfielders: 4 Wuilfredo Antúnez; 1 Jake Fox; 15 Joe Lampe; 9 Guy Lipscomb; 8 Nick Mitchell; 27 Alfonsin Rosario	Manager: 26 Greg DiCenzo; Coaches: 55 Angus Adams (pitching); 48 Jordan Becker (hitting); 47 Gustavo Nava (development); 43 Cole Nieto (hitting); 54 Michael Poole (pitching); 33 Yan Rivera (bench); 60-day injured list: -- Jonah Advincula; -- Rodney Boone (full-season); -- Kyle Dernedde; -- Zach Jacobs; -- Davis Sharpe; -- Carter Spivey (full-season); 7-day injured list; * On Cleveland Guardians 40-man roster; ~ Development list; # Rehab assignment; ∞ Reserve list; ‡ Restricted list; § Suspended list; † Temporarily inactive list; Roster updated April 22, 2026; Transactions; → More rosters: MiLB • Eastern League; → Cleveland Guardians minor league players

=== Altoona Curve ===
Altoona Curve roster
Players	Coaches/Other
Pitchers: 46 Jarod Bayless; 34 Emmanuel Chapman; 44 Po-Yu Chen; 12 Khristian Curtis; 7 Jaycob Deese; -- Derek Diamond; -- Alessandro Ercolani; 18 Joshua Loeschorn; 22 Cy Nielson; 14 Dominic Perachi; 36 Dominic Pipkin; 35 Anthony Solometo; 53 Peyton Stumbo; 24 Landon Tomkins; -- Michael Walsh; 32 Connor Wietgrefe; 17 Jaden Woods; 41 Tyrone Yulie; Catchers: 5 Omar Alfonzo; 28 Derek Berg; Infielders: 47 Jack Brannigan *; 54 Jesus Castillo; 13 Keiner Delgado; 2 Duce Gourson; 19 Mitch Jebb; 25 Callan Moss; 6 Javier Rivas; 10 Shawn Ross; Outfielders: 27 Titus Dumitru; 3 P.J. Hilson; 38 Will Taylor	Manager: 49 Andy Fox; Coaches: 48 Gary Green (bench); 15 Justin Orton (hitting); 30 David Perez (pitching); 50 Scott Seabol (hitting); 45 Kevin Walker (pitching); 60-day injured list: -- Garrett McMillan; 7-day injured list; * On Pittsburgh Pirates 40-man roster; ~ Development list; # Rehab assignment; ∞ Reserve list; ‡ Restricted list; § Suspended list; † Temporarily inactive list; Roster updated April 19, 2026; Transactions; → More rosters: MiLB • Eastern League; → Pittsburgh Pirates minor league players

=== Chesapeake Baysox ===
Chesapeake Baysox roster
Players	Coaches/Other
Pitchers: 14 Cohen Achen; 53 Micah Ashman; 37 Zane Barnhart; -- Bradley Brehmer; 29 Trace Bright; 26 Luis De León; 24 Sebastian Gongora; 43 Jean Henriquez; 19 Christian Herberholz; 33 Daniel Lloyd; -- Blake Money; 16 Tyson Neighbors; 30 Yaqui Rivera; 31 Carlos Tavera; 25 Eric Torres; 52 Ben Vespi; -- Juaron Watts-Brown; 48 Evan Yates; Catchers: 22 Ethan Anderson; 9 Adam Retzbach; Infielders: 15 Frederick Bencosme; 4 Brandon Butterworth; 7 Anderson De Los Santos; 10 Aron Estrada; 23 Griff O'Ferrall; 18 Alfredo Velásquez; 1 Carter Young; Outfielders: 5 Douglas Hodo III; 12 Tavian Josenberger; 17 Thomas Sosa	Manager: 21 Roberto Mercado; Coaches: 58 Josh Bunselmeyer (hitting); 45 Calvin Christiansen (development); 52 Ryan Goll (fundamentals); 36 Jeremy Hileman (pitching); 60-day injured list: -- Braxton Bragg; 19 Zach Fruit; -- Juan Núñez; -- Edgar Portes; -- Patrick Reilly; 7-day injured list; * On Baltimore Orioles 40-man roster; ~ Development list; # Rehab assignment; ∞ Reserve list; ‡ Restricted list; § Suspended list; † Temporarily inactive list; Roster updated April 18, 2026; Transactions; → More rosters: MiLB • Eastern League; → Baltimore Orioles minor league players

=== Erie SeaWolves ===
Erie SeaWolves roster
Players	Coaches/Other
Pitchers: 96 Max Alba; 38 Wandisson Charles; 20 Colin Fields; 32 Dariel Fregio; 28 Woo-suk Go; -- Jaden Hamm; 25 Sean Hunley; 21 Tanner Kohlhepp; 27 Trevin Michael; 40 Joe Miller; 13 Tyler Owens; 14 Carlos Peña; 31 Moises Rodriguez; 45 Yosber Sanchez; -- Andrew Sears; 10 Kenny Serwa; 15 Eric Silva; 30 Johan Simon †; 34 John Stankiewicz; 50 Luke Taggart; Catchers: 22 Aaron Antonini; 29 Bennett Lee; 49 Thayron Liranzo *; Infielders: 12 Joe Campagna; 3 E.J. Exposito; 24 Peyton Graham; 26 Andrew Jenkins; 37 Izaac Pacheco; 36 John Peck; Outfielders: 18 Justice Bigbie; -- Daniel Cabrera ‡; 4 Brett Callahan; 23 Chris Meyers; 1 Seth Stephenson	Manager: -- Tony Cappuccilli; Coaches: -- Nick Franklin (bench); -- Nick Green (pitching); -- Kyle MacKinnon (hitting); 60-day injured list: -- Josue Briceño; -- Garrett Burhenn (full season); -- Marco Jimenez; -- Joseph Montalvo; -- Jack Penney; 7-day injured list; * On Detroit Tigers 40-man roster; ~ Development list; # Rehab assignment; ∞ Reserve list; ‡ Restricted list; § Suspended list; † Temporarily inactive list; Roster updated April 22, 2026; Transactions; → More rosters: MiLB • Eastern League; → Detroit Tigers minor league players

=== Harrisburg Senators ===
Harrisburg Senators roster
Players	Coaches/Other
Pitchers: 4 Alex Clemmey; 12 Davian Garcia; 14 Sandy Gaston; 28 Marcus Grissom Jr.; 34 Chance Huff; 32 Jackson Kent; 48 Valentin Linarez; 44 Kyle Luckham; 29 Erick Mejia; 40 Holden Powell; 22 Thomas Schultz; 24 Jared Simpson; 35 Eriq Swan; 31 Connor Van Scoyoc; 13 Luke Young; Catchers: -- Kyle Hess; 15 Caleb Lomavita; 21 Maxwell Romero Jr.; Infielders: 25 Sam Brown; 3 Seaver King; 6 Cortland Lawson; 16 Kervin Pichardo; 10 Cayden Wallace; Outfielders: 8 Branden Boissiere; 11 Sam Petersen; 18 Leandro Pineda; 17 Jack Rogers; 1 Johnathon Thomas	Manager: 26 Delino DeShields; Coaches: 46 Rigo Beltrán (pitching); 41 Darin Everson (hitting); 36 JT Heenan (coach); 39 Pete Horner (assistant pitching); 2 Nik McClaughry (defensive); 60-day injured list: 2 Kevin Made; -- Alejandro Rosario (full season); 19 Tyler Stuart; 23 Jarlin Susana; -- Travis Sykora; 7-day injured list; * On Washington Nationals 40-man roster; ~ Development list; # Rehab assignment; ∞ Reserve list; ‡ Restricted list; § Suspended list; † Temporarily inactive list; Roster updated April 19, 2026; Transactions; → More rosters: MiLB • Eastern League; → Washington Nationals minor league players

=== Richmond Flying Squirrels ===
Richmond Flying Squirrels roster
Players	Coaches/Other
Pitchers: 53 Will Bednar; 60 Dylan Carmouche; 48 Jack Choate; 46 R. J. Dabovich; -- Brad Deppermann; 43 Greg Farone; 29 Dylan Hecht; 45 Logan Martin; 50 Manuel Mercedes; 57 Cesar Perdomo; 32 Cameron Pferrer; 33 Shane Rademacher; 40 Darien Smith; 28 Tyler Vogel; 18 Trystan Vrieling; 35 Mitch White; 49 Joe Whitman; Catchers: 19 Drew Cavanaugh; 23 Zach Morgan; 16 Jack Payton; 15 Adrián Sugastey; Infielders: 6 Maui Ahuna; 13 Aeverson Arteaga; 2 Sabin Ceballos; 14 Dayson Croes; -- Parks Harber; 10 Charlie Szykowny; 1 Diego Velasquez; Outfielders: 7 Scott Bandura; 8 Jonah Cox; 5 Bo Davidson	Manager: 12 Dennis Pelfrey; Coaches: 52 Tommy Everidge (hitting); 9 Mike Morris (bullpen); 17 Lipso Nava (fundamentals); 58 Paul Oseguera (pitching); 7-day injured list; * On San Francisco Giants 40-man roster; ~ Development list; # Rehab assignment; ∞ Reserve list; ‡ Restricted list; § Suspended list; † Temporarily inactive list; Roster updated April 16, 2026; Transactions; → More rosters: MiLB • Eastern League; → San Francisco Giants minor league players

== See also ==
- List of Southern League team rosters
- List of Texas League team rosters
