= Pittsburgh Pirates minor league players =

Below are the rosters of the minor league affiliates of the Pittsburgh Pirates:

== Players ==
=== Jean Cabrera ===
Jean Cabrera

Pittsburgh Pirates
- Pitcher
- Born: October 20, 2001 (age 25); Maracay, Venezuela
- Bats: Right Throws: Right

Jean Carlos Eduardo Cabrera (born October 20, 2001) is a Venezuelan professional baseball pitcher in the Pittsburgh Pirates organization.

Cabrera signed with the Philadelphia Phillies as an international free agent in July 2019. He did not play in a game 2020 due to the cancellation of the minor league season because of the COVID-19 pandemic, and did not make his professional debut until 2021 with the Dominican Summer League Phillies White. In 13 starts in the Dominican Summer League, Cabrera finished with a 1.54 ERA, good for 6th in the league. For his efforts, he was also awarded the Paul Owens Award as the best pitcher in the Phillies system for the 2021 season. Following the season, Cabrera pitched for the Tiburones de La Guaira of the Venezuelan Professional Baseball League.

Cabrera was promoted to the Clearwater Threshers of the Single-A Florida State League to start the 2022 season. On the season, he struggled to a 5.24 ERA over 46.1 innings of work. Returning to Clearwater to start the 2023 season, Cabrera's ERA improved to 4.32 as he threw 81 1/3 innings.

Cabrera started 2024 with the High-A Jersey Shore BlueClaws of the South Atlantic League before being promoted to the Reading Fightin Phils of the Double-A Eastern League in July. On November 19, 2024, the Phillies added Cabrera to their 40-man roster to protect him from the Rule 5 draft.

Cabrera was optioned to Double-A Reading to begin the 2025 season. He made 26 starts for Reading during the year, compiling a 6-9 record and 3.81 ERA with 127 strikeouts over 137 innings of work.

Cabrera was optioned to the Triple-A Lehigh Valley IronPigs to begin the 2026 season. In 15 starts split between Lehigh and Reading, he struggled to a 3-6 record and 9.10 ERA with 46 strikeouts across 62 1/3 innings pitched. Cabrera was designated for assignment by the Phillies on July 5, 2026; he cleared waivers and was sent outright to Reading on July 11. On August 28, Cabrera was released by the Phillies organization.

On September 5, 2026, Cabrera signed a minor league contract with the Pittsburgh Pirates.

- Career statistics from Baseball Reference (Minors)

=== Easton Carmichael ===
Easton Carmichael

Pittsburgh Pirates
- Catcher
- Born: November 3, 2003 (age 23); Tulsa, Oklahoma, U.S.
- Bats: Right Throws: Right

Easton Brant Carmichael (born November 3, 2003) is an American professional baseball catcher in the Pittsburgh Pirates organization.

Carmichael attended Prosper High School in Prosper, Texas and played college baseball for the Oklahoma Sooners. In 2024, he played collegiate summer baseball with the Yarmouth–Dennis Red Sox of the Cape Cod Baseball League, and was named MVP of the league's all-star game. He was selected by the Pittsburgh Pirates in the third round of the 2025 Major League Baseball draft.

Carmichael made his professional debut in 2025 with the Greensboro Grasshoppers and started 2026 with them.

- Career statistics from Baseball Reference (Minors)

=== Alessandro Ercolani ===
Alessandro Ercolani

Pittsburgh Pirates
- Pitcher
- Born: April 20, 2004 (age 22); Borgo Maggiore, San Marino
- Bats: Right Throws: Right

Alessandro Ercolani (born April 20, 2004) is a Sammarinese baseball pitcher in the Pittsburgh Pirates organization.

Ercolani is from Borgo Maggiore. He played in the 2016 Little League World Series with the Emilia Little League team. Ercolani signed with the Pittsburgh Pirates in 2021. He is the first minor league player from San Marino.

Ercolani spent his first two professional seasons with the Florida Complex League Pirates. He was selected as a reserve for the Italian national baseball team for the 2023 World Baseball Classic, but did not appear in the competition. In 2023, he played for the Bradenton Marauders and in the Arizona Fall League. He played for the Greensboro Grasshoppers in 2024 and for the Altoona Curve in 2025.

- Career statistics from Baseball Reference (Minors)

=== Edward Florentino ===
Edward Florentino

Pittsburgh Pirates
- Outfielder
- Born: November 11, 2006 (age 20); Los Alcarrizos, Dominican Republic
- Bats: Left Throws: Right

Edward Adonis Florentino (born November 11, 2006) is a Dominican professional baseball outfielder in the Pittsburgh Pirates organization.

Florentino signed with the Pittsburgh Pirates as an international free agent in January 2024. He made his professional debut that year with the Dominican Summer League Pirates. He started 2025 with the Florida Complex League Pirates before being promoted to the Bradenton Marauders.

- Career statistics from Baseball Reference (Minors)

=== Murf Gray ===
Murf Gray

Pittsburgh Pirates
- Third baseman
- Born: December 30, 2003 (age 22); Madera, California, U.S.
- Bats: Right Throws: Right

Triston Allen Gray (born December 30, 2003) is an American professional baseball third baseman in the Pittsburgh Pirates organization.

Gray attended Madera South High School in Madera, California and played college baseball for the Fresno State Bulldogs. In 2024, he played collegiate summer baseball with the Wareham Gatemen of the Cape Cod Baseball League. He was selected by the Pittsburgh Pirates in the second round of the 2025 Major League Baseball draft.

Gray made his professional debut in 2026 with the Bradenton Marauders.

- Career statistics from Baseball Reference (Minors)

=== Mitch Jebb ===
Mitch Jebb
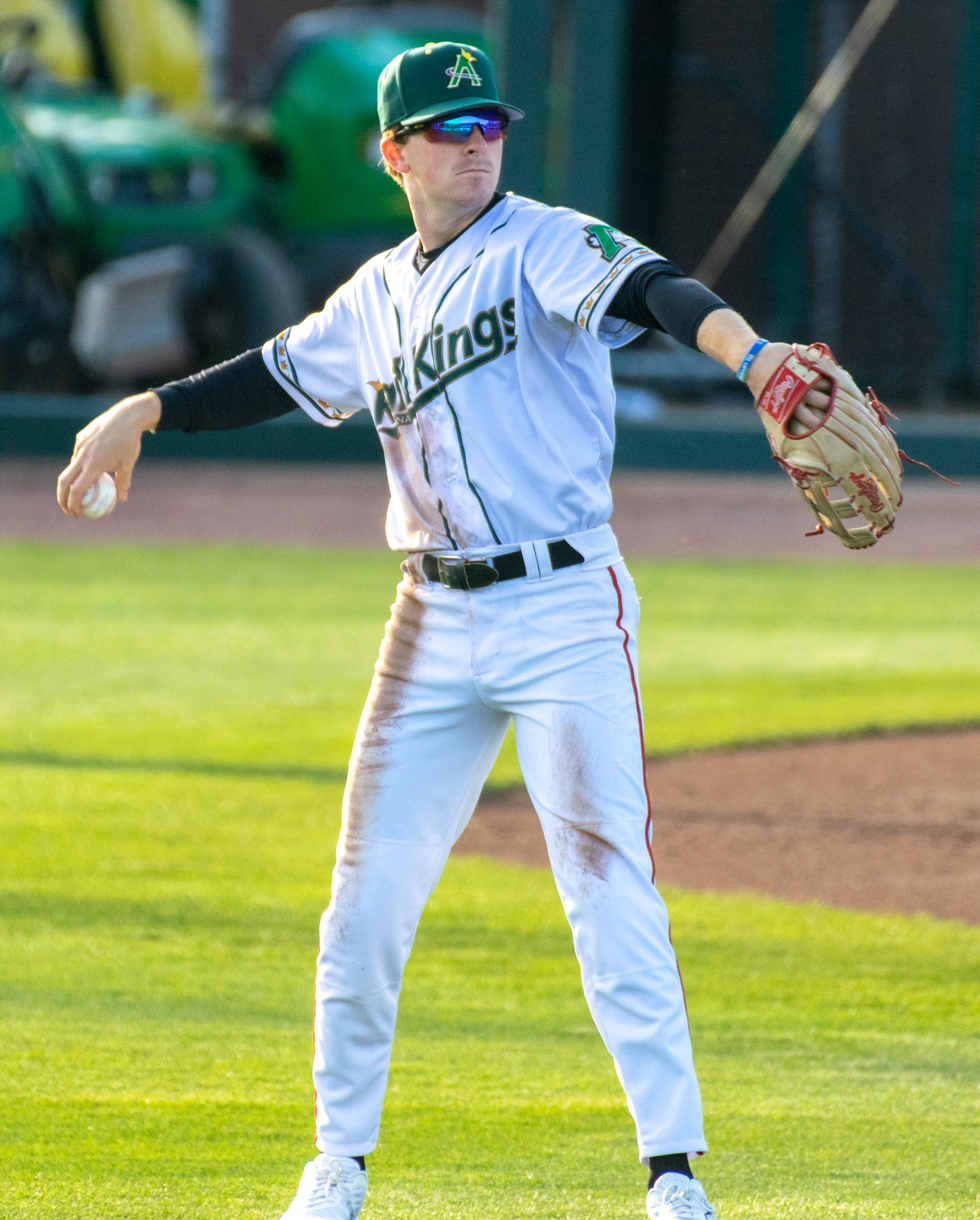
- Jebb with the Altoona Curve in 2025

Pittsburgh Pirates
- Center fielder
- Born: May 13, 2002 (age 24); Saginaw, Michigan, U.S.
- Bats: Left Throws: Right

Mitchell Louis Jebb (born May 13, 2002) is an American professional baseball center fielder in the Pittsburgh Pirates organization.

Jebb attended Swan Valley High School and Michigan State University. In Jebb's college career, he was a three-time all-Big Ten selection, being Third team all-Big Ten in 2023 and 2022, and Freshman all-Big Ten in 2021. During the 2022 season Jebb had a .356 batting average and six home runs, Jebb followed up his great season with another great one in 2023 where he recorded a .337 batting average, with 15 doubles and one homerun. In 2022, he played collegiate summer baseball with the Hyannis Harbor Hawks of the Cape Cod Baseball League.

Jebb was selected by the Pittsburgh Pirates in the second round, with the 42nd overall selection, of the 2023 Major League Baseball draft. On July 14, 2023, Jebb signed with the Pirates for a $1.65 million signing bonus.

Jebb made his professional debut with the Single-A Bradenton Marauders, hitting .297 across 34 games. He made 113 appearances for the High-A Greensboro Grasshoppers during the 2024 season, slashing .253/.341/.355 with six home runs, 42 RBI, and 43 stolen bases. In 2025, Jebb played in 122 games with the Double-A Altoona Curve and hit .265 with 34 RBIs and 33 stolen bases.

- Career statistics from MLB · Baseball Reference (Minors)
- Michigan State Spartans bio

=== Ryan McCarty ===
Ryan McCarty

Pittsburgh Pirates
- Shortstop
- Born: April 22, 1999 (age 27); Yardley, Pennsylvania, U.S.
- Bats: Right Throws: Right

Ryan Daniel McCarty (born April 22, 1999) is an American professional baseball shortstop in the Pittsburgh Pirates organization.

McCarty grew up in Yardley, Pennsylvania and attended Pennsbury High School. McCarty played college baseball at Division III Penn State Abington for five seasons as a two-way player. In his final season, he was the only non-Division I player to be named a semifinalist for the Golden Spikes Award after leading Division III with a .529 average, 100 hits, and 29 home runs. In 2022, he played collegiate summer baseball with the Harwich Mariners of the Cape Cod Baseball League.

McCarty was signed by the Toronto Blue Jays as an undrafted free agent on July 21, 2022. After signing, he was assigned to the Dunedin Blue Jays of the Single-A Florida State League. McCarty began the 2023 season with Dunedin, where he batted .248 with seven home runs and 30 RBIs in 59 games before being promoted to the High-A Vancouver Canadians. He split 2024 with the Canadians and the Double-A New Hampshire Fisher Cats and hit .244 with 14 home runs and 50 RBIs. McCarty returned to New Hampshire at the start of the 2025 season before being promoted to the Triple-A Buffalo Bisons.

McCarty made 29 appearances for Triple–A Buffalo in 2026, slashing .239/.378/.254 with four RBI and three stolen bases. On June 16, 2026, McCarty was released by the Blue Jays organization.

On July 1, 2026, McCarty signed a minor league contract with the Pittsburgh Pirates.

- Career statistics from Baseball Reference (Minors)
- Penn State Abington Lions bio

=== Zander Mueth ===
Zander Mueth

Pittsburgh Pirates
- Pitcher
- Born: June 22, 2005 (age 21); Belleville, Illinois, U.S.
- Bats: Right Throws: Right

Zander Charles Mueth (born June 22, 2005) is an American professional baseball pitcher in the Pittsburgh Pirates organization.

Mueth attended Belleville High School-East in Belleville, Illinois. In Mueth's senior season, he struck out 62 batters over a span of 37 and 2/3 innings. Mueth was invited to play in the High School All-American Game that was held in Dodger Stadium. Mueth committed to play college baseball at Ole Miss.

Mueth was selected by the Pittsburgh Pirates in the second round, with the 67th overall selection, of the 2023 Major League Baseball draft. On July 20, 2023, Mueth signed with the Pirates for a signing bonus worth $1,797,500.

Mueth made his professional debut with the Florida Complex League Pirates and was later promoted to the Bradenton Marauders. Over 19 starts between both teams, he went 7-4 with a 2.31 ERA and 79 strikeouts over 74 innings. Mueth returned to Bradenton to open the 2025 season alongside spending time on a rehab assignment in the Florida Complex League.

- Career statistics from MLB · Baseball Reference (Minors)

=== Axiel Plaz ===
Axiel Plaz

Pittsburgh Pirates
- Catcher
- Born: August 12, 2005 (age 21); San Felix, Venezuela
- Bats: Right Throws: Right

Axiel Naim Plaz (born August 12, 2005) is a Venezuelan professional baseball catcher in the Pittsburgh Pirates organization.

Plaz signed with the Pittsburgh Pirates as an international free agent in January 2022. He made his professional debut that season with the Dominican Summer League Pirates. He played 2023 with the Florida Complex League Pirates and 2024 with the FCL Pirates and Bradenton Marauders.

Plaz played 2025 with Bradenton and the Greensboro Grasshoppers. After the season, he played in the Arizona Fall League. He started 2026 with Greensboro.

- Career statistics from Baseball Reference (Minors)

=== Carlson Reed ===
Carlson Reed

Pittsburgh Pirates
- Pitcher
- Born: November 27, 2002 (age 23); Atlanta, Georgia, U.S.
- Bats: Left Throws: Right

Carlson Timothy Reed (born November 27, 2002) is an American professional baseball pitcher in the Pittsburgh Pirates organization.

Reed attended Marietta High School in Marietta, Georgia and played college baseball at the West Virginia University. In 2022, he played collegiate summer baseball with the Harwich Mariners of the Cape Cod Baseball League. He was selected by the Pittsburgh Pirates in the fourth round of the 2023 Major League Baseball draft. He was converted into a starting pitcher by the Pirates after pitching out of the bullpen at West Virginia.

Reed made his professional debut with the Florida Complex League Pirates. He started 2024 with the Bradenton Marauders and was promoted to the Greensboro Grasshoppers during the season.

- Career statistics from MLB · Baseball Reference (Minors)
- West Virginia Mountaineers bio

=== Wyatt Sanford ===
Wyatt Sanford

Pittsburgh Pirates
- Shortstop / Second baseman
- Born: November 24, 2005 (age 20); Frisco, Texas, U.S.
- Bats: Left Throws: Right

Wyatt Steven Sanford (born November 24, 2005) is an American professional baseball shortstop in the Pittsburgh Pirates organization.

Sanford attended Independence High School in Frisco, Texas. He was selected by the Pittsburgh Pirates in the second round of the 2024 Major League Baseball draft. Sanford signed with the Pirates for $2.5 million, forgoing his commitment to play college baseball at Texas A&M University.

Sanford made his professional debut in 2025 with the Florida Complex League Pirates before being promoted to the Bradenton Marauders after 20 games. Sanford appeared in 64 games between both teams and hit .243 with five home runs, 25 RBI, and 34 stolen bases before an injury ended his season in August.

Sanford's father, Chance Sanford, previously played in MLB for the Pirates and Los Angeles Dodgers.

- Career statistics from Baseball Reference (Minors)

=== Anthony Solometo ===
Anthony Solometo

Pittsburgh Pirates
- Pitcher
- Born: December 2, 2002 (age 23); Voorhees Township, New Jersey, U.S.
- Bats: Left Throws: Left

Anthony Epifanio Solometo (born December 2, 2002) is an American professional baseball pitcher in the Pittsburgh Pirates organization.

Solometo began his high school career at Gloucester Catholic High School in Gloucester City, New Jersey. He committed to play college baseball at the University of North Carolina prior to his freshman year. As a sophomore in 2019, he went 5–2 with a 1.59 ERA and 64 strikeouts over 44 innings. Prior to his junior season in 2020, he transferred to Bishop Eustace Preparatory School in Pennsauken Township, New Jersey, where he graduated in 2021. As a senior in 2021, he did not give up his first run or first hit until 17 1/3 innings into the season. He finished the season with a 0.22 ERA and 65 strikeouts over 32 1/3 innings.

Solometo was selected by the Pittsburgh Pirates in the second round with the 37th overall selection of the 2021 Major League Baseball draft. Solometo signed with the Pirates for a $2.8 million signing bonus.

After starting the 2022 season in extended spring training, Solometo was assigned to the Bradenton Marauders of the Single-A Florida State League in late May to make his professional debut. Over 13 games (eight starts), he went 5–1 with a 2.64 ERA and 51 strikeouts over 47 2/3 innings. To open the 2023 season, Solometo was assigned to the Greensboro Grasshoppers of the High-A South Atlantic League. In mid-June, he was promoted to the Altoona Curve of the Double-A Eastern League. Over 24 starts between the two teams, Solometo went 4–7 with a 3.26 ERA and 118 strikeouts over 110 1/3 innings.

Solometo played the 2024 season with the rookie-level Florida Complex League Pirates, Bradenton, and Altoona. He pitched in 23 games (20 starts) between the three teams and had a 1–8 record and 5.37 ERA. Solometo made three starts with Altoona to open the 2025 season before being placed on the injured list in May with a left shoulder injury. He made one rehab start with Bradenton, but did not return to play after. Solometo returned to Altoona to begin 2026 and made two starts. In May, he was placed on the full-season injured list and underwent surgery on his labrum in his left shoulder, forcing him to miss the remainder of the 2026 season.

- Career statistics from Baseball Reference (Minors)

=== Levi Sterling ===
Levi Sterling

Pittsburgh Pirates
- Pitcher
- Born: September 2, 2006 (age 20); Los Angeles, California, U.S.
- Bats: Right Throws: Right

Levi Sterling (born September 2, 2006) is an American professional baseball pitcher in the Pittsburgh Pirates organization.

Sterling attended Notre Dame High School in Sherman Oaks, California. In 2023, he played for the United States national under-18 baseball team in Taiwan alongside fellow Pirates draft pick Konnor Griffin. As a senior at Notre Dame in 2024, he had a 2.62 ERA and batted .319. He committed to play college baseball at the University of Texas.

Sterling was selected by the Pittsburgh Pirates with the 37th overall pick in the 2024 Major League Baseball draft. He signed with the team for $2.51 million. Sterling made his professional debut in 2025 with the Rookie-level Florida Complex League Pirates with whom he had a 3–2 record and 6.54 ERA across 11 games. He also made one scoreless appearance for the Single-A Bradenton Marauders. Sterling was assigned to Bradenton to begin the 2026 season. In August, he was promoted to the High-A Greensboro Grasshoppers. Sterling made a total of 24 starts between both teams and went 4–8 with a 4.56 ERA and 130 strikeouts over 108 2/3 innings.

- Career statistics from Baseball Reference (Minors)

=== Connor Wietgrefe ===
Connor Wietgrefe

Pittsburgh Pirates
- Pitcher
- Born: June 6, 2002 (age 24); Phoenix, Arizona, U.S.
- Bats: Right Throws: Left

Connor Wietgrefe (born June 6, 2002) is an American professional baseball pitcher in the Pittsburgh Pirates organization.

Wietgrefe attended Prior Lake High School in Savage, Minnesota and played college baseball at North Iowa Area Community College and the University of Minnesota. As a junior at Minnesota in 2024, he had an 8–4 record with a 2.77 ERA and 74 strikeouts over 78 innings. In 2024, he played collegiate summer baseball with the Bourne Braves of the Cape Cod Baseball League.

Wietgrefe was selected by the Pittsburgh Pirates in the seventh round of the 2024 Major League Baseball draft. He made his professional debut after signing with the Single-A Bradenton Marauders with whom he had a 0.90 ERA across 10 innings pitched. He started the 2025 season with Bradenton and was promoted to the High-A Greensboro Grasshoppers and Double-A Altoona Curve during the season. Over 26 starts between the three teams, he had a 6–4 record, a 3.10 ERA and 101 strikeouts across 116 innings. Wietgrefe returned to Altoona to start the 2026 season and was promoted to the Triple-A Indianapolis Indians in June. Across 29 games (28 starts) between both teams, he went 10–6 with a 3.27 ERA and 134 strikeouts over 151 1/3 innings.

- Career statistics from Baseball Reference (Minors)
- Minnesota Golden Gophers bio

== Full Triple-A to Rookie League rosters ==
=== Triple-A ===
Indianapolis Indians roster
Players		Coaches/Other
Pitchers: 43 Michael Darrell-Hicks; 50 Derek Diamond; 26 Nick Dombkowski; 46 Justin Meis; 39 Brandon Neeck; 19 Cy Nielson; 41 Landon Tomkins; 22 Cristhian Tortosa; 6 Michael Walsh; 33 Connor Wietgrefe	Catchers: 31 Derek Berg; Infielders: 2 Jesus Castillo; 20 Nick Cimillo; 27 Duce Gourson; -- Termarr Johnson; Outfielders: -- Kyler Fedko; 16 Mike Jarvis; 11 Mitch Jebb	Manager: 18 Eric Patterson; Coaches: 15 Drew Benes (pitching); 51 Nasusel Cabrera (pitching); 37 JD Closser (catching); 28 Casey Harms (hitting); 38 Eric Munson (hitting); 48 Joe Thatcher (coach); 7-day injured list; * On Pittsburgh Pirates 40-man roster; ~ Development list; # Rehab assignment; ∞ Reserve list; ‡ Restricted list; § Suspended list; † Temporarily inactive list; Roster updated November 2, 2026; Transactions; → More rosters: MiLB • International League; → Pittsburgh Pirates minor league players

=== Double-A ===
Altoona Curve roster
Players		Coaches/Other
Pitchers: 43 Matt Ager; 35 Jarod Bayless; 45 Po-Yu Chen; 19 Jaycob Deese; -- Alessandro Ercolani; 22 Claudio Estelie; 53 Dariel Francia; 24 Yonleg Gaetano; 18 Joshua Loeschorn; -- Garrett McMillan; -- Andrew Moore; 17 Connor Oliver; 18 Tyler Owens; -- Dominic Perachi; 7 Jake Shirk; 34 Aaron Shortridge; -- Anthony Solometo; 44 Peyton Stumbo; 13 Sean Sullivan	Catchers: 28 Easton Carmichael; 10 Samuel Escudero; 32 Camden Janik; Infielders: 2 Keiner Delgado; 23 Murf Gray; 5 Matt King; 25 Callan Moss; 12 Javier Rivas; Outfielders: 38 Ivan Brethowr; 27 Titus Dumitru; 46 Will Taylor; 3 Lonnie White	Manager: 49 Andy Fox; Coaches: 48 Gary Green (bench); 15 Justin Orton (hitting); 30 David Perez (pitching); 50 Scott Seabol (hitting); 45 Kevin Walker (pitching); 7-day injured list; * On Pittsburgh Pirates 40-man roster; ~ Development list; # Rehab assignment; ∞ Reserve list; ‡ Restricted list; § Suspended list; † Temporarily inactive list; Roster updated November 2, 2026; Transactions; → More rosters: MiLB • Eastern League; → Pittsburgh Pirates minor league players

=== High-A ===
Greensboro Grasshoppers roster
Players		Coaches/Other
Pitchers: 39 Jack Anker; 31 Cesar Aquino; 35 Jacob Bimbi; 48 Victor Cabreja; 18 Brandon Cain; -- Carlos Castillo; 28 Hung-Leng Chang; 99 Junior Flores; 41 Ronaldo Gallo; 44 Jose Garces; -- Seth Hernandez; -- Owen Kellington; -- Cameron Keshock; 16 Kyle Larsen; 16 Inmer Lobo; 14 Bryan Mena; 25 Greiber Mendez; 49 Reinold Navarro; 23 Adolfo Oviedo; 27 Treyson Peters; 26 Yulian Quintana; 29 Carlson Reed; 22 Braydon Risley; 45 Levi Sterling; -- Alexis Torres; 51 Draven Zeigler	Catchers: 38 Axiel Plaz; 36 Richard Ramirez; 17 Jonathan Rivero; Infielders: 47 Tony Blanco Jr.; 2 Carlos Caro; 8 Yordany De Los Santos; 37 Brent Iredale; 37 Jared Jones; 5 Dylan Palmer; 24 Wyatt Sanford; 34 Jhonny Severino; Outfielders: 15 Edward Florentino; 32 Eddie King Jr.; 10 Shalin Polanco; 7 Josh Tate	Manager: -- José Mosquera; Coaches: 50 Quentin Brown (hitting); 52 Rafael Chaves (pitching); 9 Pedro Florimón (development); 43 Jonathan Roof (hitting); 30 Phillip Wellman (bench); 7-day injured list; * On Pittsburgh Pirates 40-man roster; ~ Development list; # Rehab assignment; ∞ Reserve list; ‡ Restricted list; § Suspended list; † Temporarily inactive list; Roster updated November 2, 2026; Transactions; → More rosters: MiLB • South Atlantic League; → Pittsburgh Pirates minor league players

=== Single-A ===
Bradenton Marauders roster
Players		Coaches/Other
Pitchers: 24 Gavin Adams; 49 Kyle Calzadiaz; 30 Felix Doroteo; -- Jaiker Garcia; 26 Michael Gibson; 16 Nathan Helman; 15 Wifrailyn Jaquez; 41 Rohan Lettow; 46 Dioris Martinez; 12 Jeter Martinez; -- Carlos Mateo; 34 Dylan Mathiesen; 31 David Matoma; 54 Bryson Moore; 29 Zander Mueth; 51 Alex Overbay; 45 Irwin Ramirez; -- Pitterson Rosa; 25 Yeraldo Salcedo; 77 Dakota Stone; -- Clevari Tejada; -- Jesus Travieso; 54 Victor Trejo	Catchers: 86 Edgleen Perez; 6 Jack Scanlon; Infielders: 38 Kendrick Herrera; 28 Francisco Loreto; 3 Raymond Mola; 2 Tre Phelps; 32 Antonio Pimentel; 7 Chris Rembert; -- Eddie Rynders; 27 Luke Scherrer; Outfielders: 13 Bralyn Brazoban; 17 Carl Calixte; 43 Cristian Jauregui; 5 Canon Reeder	Manager: 18 Gera Alvarez; Coaches: 5 Quentin Brown (hitting); 41 Matt Ford (pitching); 14 Jose Mendez (bench); 44 Gustavo Omana (catching); 23 Ryan Powers (hitting); 52 Jonathan Prieto (hitting); 7-day injured list; * On Pittsburgh Pirates 40-man roster; ~ Development list; # Rehab assignment; ∞ Reserve list; ‡ Restricted list; § Suspended list; † Temporarily inactive list; Roster updated November 2, 2026; Transactions; → More rosters: MiLB • Florida State League; → Pittsburgh Pirates minor league players

=== Rookie ===
Florida Complex League Pirates roster
Players		Coaches/Other
Pitchers: -- Keuri Almonte; -- Jean Cabrera; -- Jason DeCaro; -- Spencer Evans; -- Tyler Fay; -- Tony Gonzalez; 63 Joel Ibarra; 31 Ronaldys Jimenez; -- Ryan Marohn; 84 Yeison Martinez; 10 McLane Moody; 55 Juan Muniz; -- Liam O'Leary; -- Jose Regalado; -- Damarcus Rideout-Carter; 85 Darwin Roa; 12 Robinson Smith; 56 Angel Soriano; -- Griffin Stieg; 82 Stainer Valdez	Catchers: 35 Javier Acevedo; Infielders: -- Johan De Los Santos; 34 Adbiel Feliz; 64 Jayden Kim; 73 Michell Ojeda; 77 Gustavo Melendez; 15 Darell Morel; 52 Armstrong Muhoozi; -- Fredderick Ovalle; -- Aiden Ruiz; Outfielders: -- Derek Curiel; -- Andruw Giles; 7 Carter Gwost; -- Owen Prince; 75 Gabriel Rodriguez; 28 Carlos Tejera; 3 Edgar Walker	Manager: 26 Jim Horner; Coaches: -- Josh Combs (pitching); 6 Brady Conlan (hitting); 62 Renny Duarte (pitching); 41 Damon Elarton (pitching); 37 Elys Escobar (hitting); 71 Dilan Espinal (development); 78 Bart Haanegraaf (performance); 65 Joaquin Murrietta (hitting); 7-day injured list; * On Pittsburgh Pirates 40-man roster; ~ Development list; # Rehab assignment; ∞ Reserve list; ‡ Restricted list; § Suspended list; † Temporarily inactive list; Roster updated November 2, 2026; Transactions; → More rosters: MiLB • Florida Complex League; → Pittsburgh Pirates minor league players

=== Foreign Rookie ===
Dominican Summer League Pirates Black roster
Players		Coaches/Other
Pitchers: 82 Saul Aguero; 43 Pietro Albanez-Rienzo; -- Jeffrey Bustos; 62 Michael Castillo; 84 Mauricio De La Cruz; 41 Micael De La Cruz; 60 Dariel Florentino; 88 Justino Francisco; 57 Angel Herrera; 86 Carlos Lorenzo; 77 Jabes Martinez; 68 Hector Perez; 48 Marlon Quintana; 53 Dennison Rodriguez; 59 Rubens Romero; 83 Angel Rosado; 54 Fredery Solano	Catchers: 14 Oscar Borges; 49 Jesus Lizardo; 46 Victor Marquez; 25 Angel Nieto; 12 Gilbert Ramirez; Infielders: 16 Luis Almeida; 31 Wilton Guerrero Jr.; 13 Frankeli Mesta; 44 Freilyn Rodriguez; 10 Yoander Santana; 67 Jhoendris Santos; Outfielders: 38 Iverson Allen; 34 Juan Figueroa; 29 Jean Rodriguez	Manager: -- Ken Matsuzaka; Coaches: -- Yendry Manzanillo (pitching); -- Justin Miknis (development); -- Luis Perez (hitting); -- Khelyn Smith (hitting); -- Angel Suero (coach); 7-day injured list; * On Pittsburgh Pirates 40-man roster; ~ Development list; # Rehab assignment; ∞ Reserve list; ‡ Restricted list; § Suspended list; † Temporarily inactive list; Roster updated November 11, 2026; Transactions; → More rosters: MiLB • Dominican Summer League; → Pittsburgh Pirates minor league players

Dominican Summer League Pirates Gold roster
Players		Coaches/Other
Pitchers: 56 Yorgenson Artigas; 72 Miguel Barras; 22 Arturo Cambero; 89 Derek Garcia; 58 Yoslaniel Hernandez; 24 Ashton Kennedy; 61 Jefferson Lopez; 79 Mervin Maiz; 78 Miguel Molina; 81 Enrique Quintana; 85 Maickol Reyes; 50 John Reynoso; 70 Hamlet Santos; 82 Ronaldo Serrano; 36 Neomar Urbina; 71 Mingxuan Zhang	Catchers: 35 Yadier Crespo; 32 Victor Familia; 26 Enyerberth Guevara; Infielders: 19 Angel Alvarez; 2 Anyelo Jean; 47 Adrian Martinez; 7 Alexandel Pio; Outfielders: 15 Jeancer Custodio; 18 Dionis Leyba; 3 Rolthemnay Marquetti; 23 Hanley Ramirez; 56 Enmanuel Rosas; 39 Fernando Triana	Manager: -- Joel Fuentes; Coaches }: -- Jose Cueto (pitching); -- Billy Hong (coach); -- Leo Perez (bench); -- Gustavo Polanco (catching); -- Kaden Shapiro (development); -- Raul Siri (hitting); 7-day injured list; * On Pittsburgh Pirates 40-man roster; ~ Development list; # Rehab assignment; ∞ Reserve list; ‡ Restricted list; § Suspended list; † Temporarily inactive list; Roster updated November 2, 2026; Transactions; → More rosters: MiLB • Dominican Summer League; → Pittsburgh Pirates minor league players
