= John Rhodes (baseball) =

American baseball player (born 2000)

Free agent
- Outfielder
- Born: August 15, 2000 (age 26); Soddy-Daisy, Tennessee, U.S.
- Bats: Right Throws: Right

John Robert Rhodes (born August 15, 2000) is an American professional baseball outfielder who is a free agent.

== Amateur career ==
Rhodes attended Chattanooga Christian School in Chattanooga, Tennessee, where he played baseball and basketball. As a senior in 2019, he hit .560 with 12 home runs and 43 RBI. He went unselected in the 2019 Major League Baseball draft and enrolled at the University of Kentucky to play college baseball.

As a freshman at Kentucky in 2020, Rhodes batted .426 with ten doubles and 19 RBI before the season was cancelled due to the COVID-19 pandemic. That summer, he played in the Northwoods League for the Fond Du Lac Dock Spiders where he hit .373. In 2021, Rhodes started all 52 of Kentucky's games and batted .251 with 11 home runs, 36 RBI, 15 doubles and seven stolen bases. After the 2021 season, he played collegiate summer baseball with the Cotuit Kettleers of the Cape Cod Baseball League.

== Professional career ==
=== Baltimore Orioles ===
Rhodes was selected by the Baltimore Orioles in the third round with the 76th overall selection of the 2021 Major League Baseball draft. He signed for $1.375 million.

Rhodes made his professional debut with the Florida Complex League Orioles before being promoted to the Delmarva Shorebirds. Over 29 games between the two teams, he batted .259 with two home runs and 33 RBI. He opened the 2022 season with the Aberdeen IronBirds. In late May, he was placed on the injured list with a wrist injury before returning to play in mid-June. In early August, he was promoted to the Bowie Baysox. Over 83 games between the two teams, he slashed .237/.359/.378 with five home runs, 44 RBI, and 16 stolen bases. Rhodes returned to Bowie for the 2023 season, hitting .228 with 17 home runs and 69 RBI over 108 games. After the season, he was selected to play in the Arizona Fall League for the Mesa Solar Sox. Rhodes was assigned back to Bowie to open the 2024 season, where he hit .202 in 104 games.

=== Los Angeles Dodgers ===
On December 11, 2024, Rhodes was selected by the Los Angeles Dodgers in the minor league phase of the Rule 5 draft. The Dodgers assigned him to the Double-A Tulsa Drillers for the 2025 season, where he batted .196/.307/.288 with seven home runs and 40 RBI across 108 appearances. Rhodes was released by the Dodgers organization on March 23, 2026.
