= Jordan Viars =

American baseball player (born 2003)

Evansville Otters
- Outfielder
- Born: July 18, 2003 (age 23); Plano, Texas, U.S.
- Bats: Left Throws: Left

Jordan Lee Viars (born July 18, 2003) is an American professional baseball outfielder for the Evansville Otters of the Frontier League.

== Amateur career ==
Viars grew up in Frisco, Texas and attended Reedy High School. As a senior, he batted .464 with eight home runs and 26 RBI. Viars had committed to play college baseball at Arkansas prior to signing with the Phillies.

== Professional career ==
=== Philadelphia Phillies ===
Viars was drafted in the third round, with the 84th overall selection, of the 2021 Major League Baseball draft by the Philadelphia Phillies. After signing with the team he was assigned to the Rookie-level Florida Complex League Phillies, where he slashed .255/.406/.468 in 64 plate appearances. Viars missed the beginning of the 2022 season due to an ankle injury. He was sent to the rookie-level Florida Complex League Phillies on a rehab assignment in June before joining the Clearwater Threshers of the Single-A Florida State League. In eight appearances for Clearwater, Viars went 5-for-24 (.208) with three RBI.

Viars returned to Clearwater for the 2023 campaign, batting .214/.315/.343 with six home runs, 29 RBI, and six stolen bases across 83 appearances. He split the 2024 season between Clearwater and the High-A Jersey Shore BlueClaws. In 91 appearances for the two affiliates, Viars slashed .232/.332/.422 with 14 home runs, 49 RBI, and two stolen bases.

Viars made 31 appearances for High-A Jersey Shore in 2025, hitting .138/.190/.202 with one home run, two RBI, and one stolen base. Viars was released by the Phillies organization on August 4, 2025.

=== Cleburne Railroaders ===
On August 9, 2025, Viars signed with the Cleburne Railroaders of the American Association of Professional Baseball. In 19 appearances for Cleburne, he batted .176/.400/.294 with three RBI and two stolen bases.

=== Evansville Otters ===
On March 11, 2026, Viars was traded to the Evansville Otters of the Frontier League in exchange for future considerations.
