= Cleveland Guardians minor league players =

List of baseball players

Below is a partial list of minor league baseball players in the Cleveland Guardians system.

== Players ==
=== Juneiker Caceres ===
Juneiker Caceres
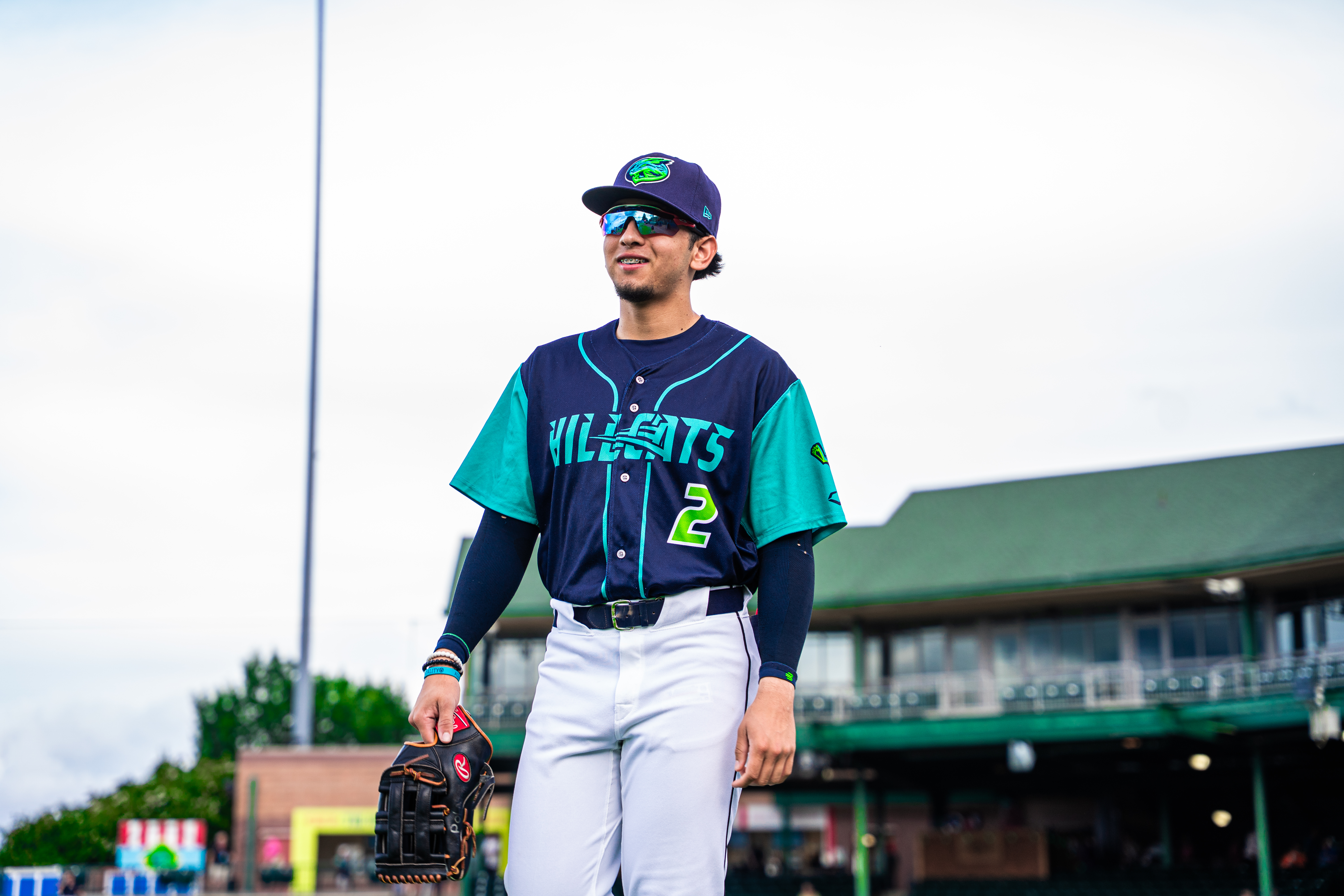
- Caceres with the Lynchburg Hillcats in 2025

Cleveland Guardians
- Outfielder
- Born: August 15, 2007 (age 19); Los Taques, Venezuela
- Bats: Left Throws: Left

Juneiker Jose Caceres (born August 15, 2007) is a Venezuelan professional baseball outfielder in the Cleveland Guardians organization.

Caceres signed with the Cleveland Guardians as an international free agent on January 15, 2024. He made his professional debut that year with the Dominican Summer League Guardians.

Caceres started 2024 with the Arizona Complex League Guardians. After hitting .289/.419/.888 in 40 games, Caceres was promoted to the Lynchburg Hillcats on July 28, 2025. In 30 games with the Hillcats, Caceres hit .250/.331/.676, in addition to winning the 2025 Carolina League Championship.

- Career statistics from Baseball Reference (Minors)

=== Jaison Chourio ===
Jaison Chourio

Cleveland Guardians
- Outfielder
- Born: May 19, 2005 (age 21); Maracaibo, Venezuela
- Bats: Switch Throws: Right

Jaison Oneel Chourio (born May 19, 2005) is a Venezuelan professional baseball outfielder in the Cleveland Guardians organization.

Chourio signed with the Cleveland Guardians as an international free agent in January 2022. He made his professional debut that year with the Dominican Summer League Guardians.

Chourio spent 2023 with the Arizona Complex League Guardians and Lynchburg Hillcats.

His brother, Jackson Chourio, plays for the Milwaukee Brewers.

- Career statistics from Baseball Reference (Minors)

=== Aaron Davenport ===
Aaron Davenport

Cleveland Guardians
- Pitcher
- Born: July 25, 2000 (age 26); Kirkland, Washington, U.S.
- Bats: Right Throws: Right

Aaron Ross Davenport (born July 25, 2000) is an American professional baseball pitcher in the Cleveland Guardians organization.

Davenport attended Cedarcrest High School in Duvall, Washington, and played college baseball at the University of Hawaiʻi. In 2019, he played collegiate summer baseball with the Wareham Gatemen of the Cape Cod Baseball League, and in 2021 he returned to the league with the Chatham Anglers. He was selected by the Cleveland Indians in the sixth round of the 2021 Major League Baseball draft. He signed for $450,000.

Davenport split his first professional season between the Arizona Complex League Indians and Lynchburg Hillcats, posting a 3.24 ERA over 16 2/3 innings. He was assigned to the Lake County Captains for the 2022 season and started 23 games, going 7–6 with a 4.21 ERA and 118 strikeouts over 107 innings. Davenport returned to Lake County for the 2023 season, pitching to a 6–10 record and 5.73 ERA across 24 games (19 starts).

Davenport spent the 2024 season with the Akron RubberDucks with whom he started 26 games and had a 7–4 record with a 2.85 ERA over 142 1/3 innings alongside 135 strikeouts (fifth in the Eastern League). Davenport returned to Akron to open the 2025 season and was promoted to the Columbus Clippers in mid-May. Over 28 games (24 starts) between the two teams, he went 7–7 with a 4.44 ERA and 117 strikeouts over 133 2/3 innings. Davenport did not make appearance during the 2026 season while recovering from Tommy John surgery. After the end of the minor league season, he was assigned to play in the Arizona Fall League with the Surprise Saguaros.

- Career statistics from Baseball Reference (Minors)
- Hawaii Rainbow Warriors bio

=== Jake Fox ===
Jake Fox

Cleveland Guardians
- Second baseman / Outfielder
- Born: February 12, 2003 (age 23); Lakeland, Florida, U.S.
- Bats: Left Throws: Right

Jacob Gage Fox (born February 12, 2003) is an American professional baseball second baseman and outfielder in the Cleveland Guardians organization.

Fox grew up in Lakeland, Florida and attended Lakeland Christian School. He hit .378, with three home runs, 22 RBIs, and 32 stolen bases in 28 games played as a senior. Fox had committed to play college baseball at Florida prior to signing with Cleveland.

Fox was selected in the third round of the 2021 Major League Baseball draft by the Cleveland Indians. After signing with the team he was assigned to the Rookie-level Arizona Complex League Indians, where he batted .405 in 13 games played.

- Career statistics from Baseball Reference (Minors)

=== Welbyn Francisca ===
Welbyn Francisca
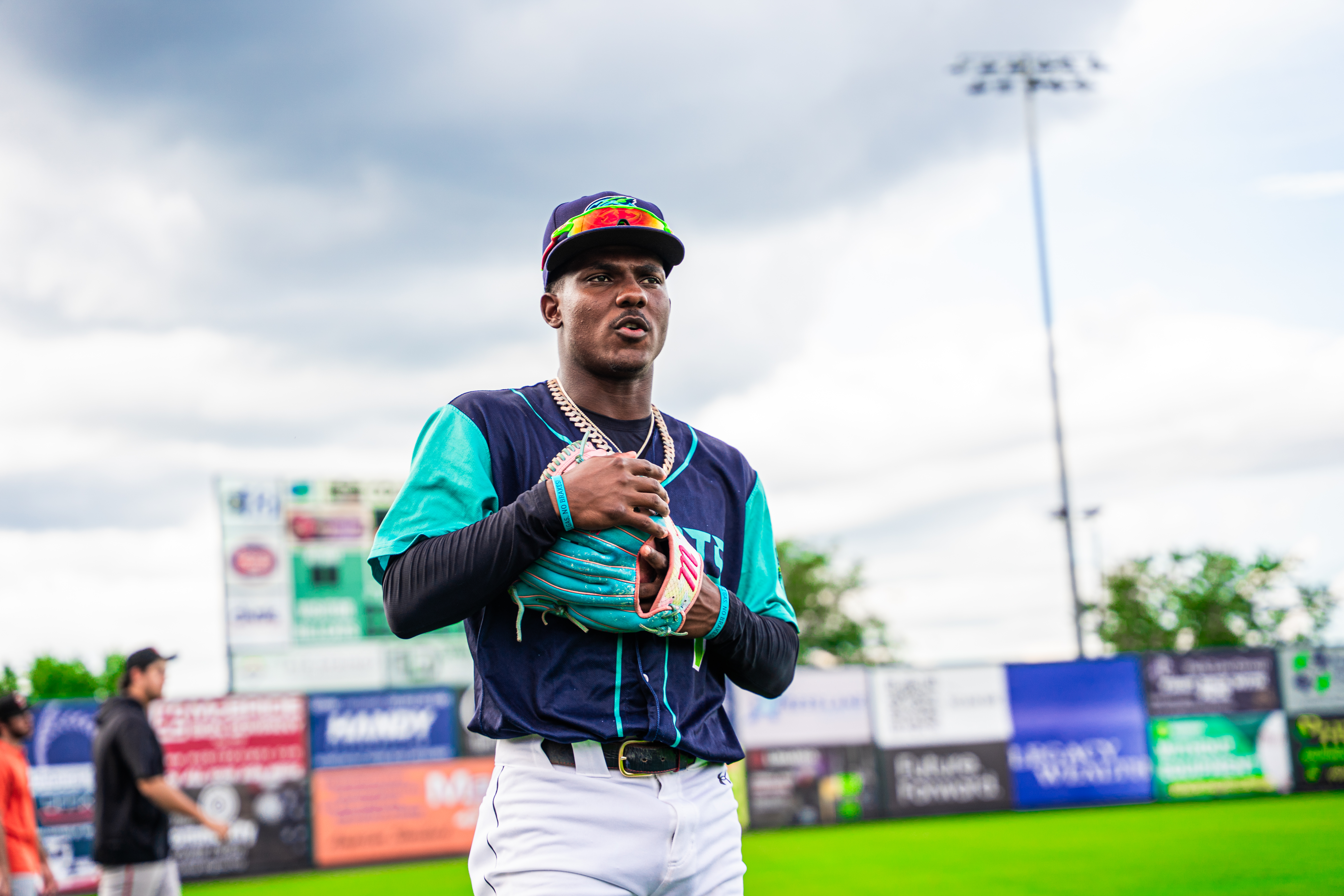
- Francisca with Hillcats in 2025

Cleveland Guardians
- Infielder
- Born: May 17, 2006 (age 20); La Romana, Dominican Republic
- Bats: Switch Throws: Right

Welbyn Miguel Francisca (born May 17, 2006) is a Dominican professional baseball infielder in the Cleveland Guardians organization.

Francisca signed with the Cleveland Guardians as an international free agent on January 15, 2023. He made his professional debut that year with the Dominican Summer League Guardians.

Francisca was called up to the Arizona Complex League Guardians on May 3, 2024. After a brief stint in Arizona, Francisca was called up to the Lynchburg Hillcats on July 29, 2024. With 117 at bats in Lynchburg, Francisca hit a .325/.402/.804 stat line.

- Career statistics from Baseball Reference (Minors)

=== Dayan Frías ===
Dayan Frías

Free agent
- Infielder
- Born: June 25, 2002 (age 24); Cartagena, Colombia
- Bats: Switch Throws: Right
Medals
Men's baseball
Representing Colombia
Junior Pan American Games
Gold medal – first place	2021 Cali-Valle	Team

Dayan de Jesús Frías Serrano (born June 25, 2002) is a Colombian professional baseball infielder who is a free agent.

Frías played for the Colombia national baseball team at the 2023 World Baseball Classic.

He elected free agency on November 2, 2026.

- Career statistics from Baseball Reference (Minors)

=== Yorman Gómez ===
Yorman Gómez
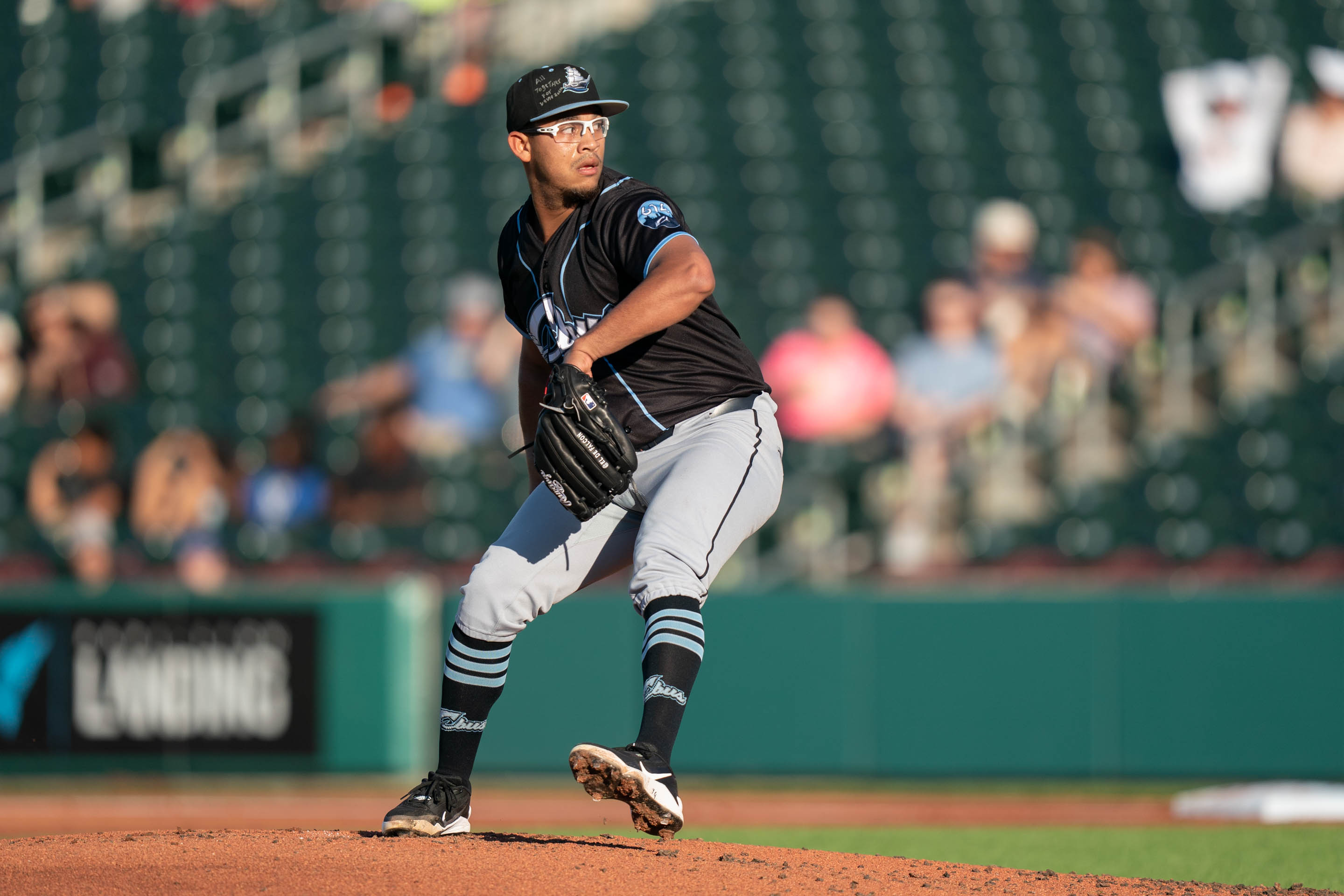
- Gomez with the Clippers in 2026

Cleveland Guardians – No. 95
- Pitcher
- Born: November 10, 2002 (age 24); Coro, Venezuela
- Bats: Right Throws: Right

Yorman Jesus Gómez (born November 10, 2002) is a Venezuelan professional baseball pitcher for the Cleveland Guardians of Major League Baseball (MLB).

Gómez signed with the Cleveland Indians as an international free agent in July 2019. He did not play in a game in 2020 due to the cancellation of the minor league season because of the COVID-19 pandemic.

In 2025, Gómez made 27 appearances (15 starts) for the High-A Lake County Captains and Double-A Akron RubberDucks, for whom he accumulated a 12–2 record and 2.96 ERA with 139 strikeouts and three saves across 121 2/3 innings pitched. On November 18, 2025, the Guardians added Gómez to their 40-man roster to protect him from the Rule 5 draft.

Gómez was optioned to the Triple-A Columbus Clippers to begin the 2026 season.

- Career statistics from Baseball Reference (Minors)

=== Luke Hill ===
Luke Hill

Cleveland Guardians
- Third baseman
- Born: April 9, 2004 (age 22); Baton Rouge, Louisiana, U.S.
- Bats: Right Throws: Right

Luke Austin Hill (born April 9, 2004) is an American professional baseball third baseman in the Cleveland Guardians organization.

Hill attended Episcopal School of Baton Rouge in Baton Rouge, Louisiana. After graduating, he played one year of college baseball at Arizona State University for the Arizona State Sun Devils and hit .314 with six home runs and 42 RBI across 54 games. Following the season's end, he transferred to the University of Mississippi to play for the Ole Miss Rebels. As a sophomore at Ole Miss in 2024, he played in 54 games and batted .291 with three home runs and 27 RBI. In 2025, Hill appeared in 63 games for the Rebels and had a .336 batting average with eight home runs, 40 RBI, and 18 stolen bases.

Hill was selected by the Cleveland Guardians in the fourth round of the 2025 Major League Baseball draft. He signed with the team for $722,600.

Hill made his professional debut with the Single-A Lynchburg Hillcats with whom he hit .347 across 15 games. He was assigned to the High-A Lake County Captains to open the 2026 season and was named Midwest League Player of the Week for May 11–17. Hill was then named Midwest League Player of the Month for May. In early June, he was promoted to the Double-A Akron RubberDucks. Across 76 games between both teams, Hill batted .254 with 13 home runs and 55 RBI. He missed over a month during the season due to an oblique strain. After the season, Hill was assigned to play in the Arizona Fall League with the Surprise Saguaros. He was named to the Fall Stars Game.

- Career statistics from Baseball Reference (Minors)
- Ole Miss Rebels bio

=== Kody Huff ===
Kody Huff

Cleveland Guardians
- Catcher
- Born: December 11, 2000 (age 25); Scottsdale, Arizona, U.S.
- Bats: Right Throws: Right

Kody Nolan Huff (born December 11, 2000) is an American professional baseball catcher in the Cleveland Guardians organization.

Huff attended Horizon High School in Scottsdale, Arizona. He was selected by the Tampa Bay Rays in the 32nd round of the 2019 Major League Baseball draft, but did not sign and instead enrolled at Stanford University where he played three years of college baseball for the Stanford Cardinal. In 2019, Huff played collegiate summer baseball for the Mat-Su Miners of the Alaska Baseball League. In 2021, he played in the Cape Cod Baseball League for the Yarmouth–Dennis Red Sox. As a junior at Stanford in 2022, he played in 65 games and hit .315 with 13 home runs and 51 RBI.

Huff was selected by the Colorado Rockies in the seventh round of the 2022 Major League Baseball draft. He made his professional debut after signing with the Rookie-level Arizona Complex League Rockies and batted .160 across 25 at-bats. He spent the 2023 season with the Single-A Fresno Grizzlies and hit .262 with five home runs and 36 RBI over 86 games.

On November 17, 2023, Huff was traded to the Cleveland Guardians in exchange for Cal Quantrill. He played the 2024 season with the Double-A Akron RubberDucks with whom he batted .245 with seven home runs and 28 RBI over 98 games. After the season, Huff played in the Arizona Fall League with the Surprise Saguaros. In 2025, he was assigned to the Triple-A Columbus Clippers and hit .222 with six home runs and 47 RBI over 101 games. Huff returned to Columbus for the 2026 season and batted .264 with 23 home runs and 81 RBI over 120 games. After the season, the Guardians added Huff to their 40-man roster to protect him from the Rule 5 draft.

- Career statistics from Baseball Reference (Minors)
- Stanford Cardinal bio

=== Michael Kennedy ===
Michael Kennedy

Cleveland Guardians
- Pitcher
- Born: November 30, 2004 (age 21); Troy, New York, U.S.
- Bats: Left Throws: Left

Michael Patrick Kennedy (born November 30, 2004) is an American professional baseball pitcher for the Cleveland Guardians organization.

Kennedy graduated from Troy High School in Troy, New York, in 2022. The Pittsburgh Pirates selected him in the fourth round of the 2022 MLB draft.

On December 10, 2024, the Pirates traded Kennedy, Luis Ortiz, and Josh Hartle to the Cleveland Guardians for Spencer Horwitz.

- Career statistics from Baseball Reference (Minors)

=== Jack Leftwich ===
Jack Leftwich

Cleveland Guardians
- Pitcher
- Born: September 26, 1998 (age 28); Cedar Rapids, Iowa, U.S.
- Bats: Right Throws: Right

Jack Harrison Leftwich (born September 26, 1998) is an American professional baseball pitcher in the Cleveland Guardians organization.

Leftwich attended TNXL Academy in Altamonte Springs, Florida and was drafted by the Detroit Tigers in the 39th round of the 2017 Major League Baseball draft. He did not sign with the Tigers and played college baseball at the University of Florida. In 2019, he played collegiate summer baseball with the Yarmouth–Dennis Red Sox of the Cape Cod Baseball League. After four years at Florida, Leftwich was drafted by the Cleveland Guardians in the seventh round of the 2021 MLB draft, and signed.

Leftwich made his professional debut in 2022 with the Lynchburg Hillcats and was promoted to the Lake County Captains. He started 2023 with Akron RubberDucks.

- Career statistics from MLB · ESPN · Fangraphs · Baseball Reference (Minors)
- Florida Gators bio

=== Alex Mooney ===
Alex Mooney

Cleveland Guardians
- Shortstop
- Born: July 6, 2002 (age 24); Nashville, Tennessee, U.S.
- Bats: Right Throws: Right

Alexander Joseph Mooney (born July 6, 2002) is an American professional baseball shortstop in the Cleveland Guardians organization.

Mooney attended St. Mary's Preparatory in Orchard Lake Village, Michigan. As a senior in 2021, he batted .460 with nine home runs and 57 RBI over 44 games, and was named Michigan Mr. Baseball. He was considered a top prospect for the 2021 Major League Baseball draft, but went unselected.

Mooney enrolled at Duke University where he played two seasons of college baseball. As a freshman for Duke in 2022, he played in 54 games and batted .292 with three home runs and 30 RBI. After the season, Mooney played in the Cape Cod Baseball League for the Falmouth Commodores in 2022 and was named a league all-star. In 2023, his sophomore season at Duke, he hit .315 with eight home runs and 38 RBI over 63 games.

Mooney was selected by the Cleveland Guardians in the seventh round of the 2023 Major League Baseball draft. He signed with the team for $1 million. Mooney made his professional debut with the Lynchburg Hillcats, batting .152 over 17 games. He was assigned to the Lake County Captains for the 2024 season. Over 105 games, Mooney hit .235 with 12 home runs, 55 RBI, and 43 stolen bases. In 2025, he played with the Akron RubberDucks with whom he hit .200 with four home runs, 37 RBI, and 25 stolen bases over 115 games. Mooney returned to play for Akron for the entirety of the 2026 season and batted .227 with 10 home runs, 59 RBI, and 30 stolen bases over 114 games.

- Career statistics from MLB · Baseball Reference (Minors)
- Duke Blue Devils bio

=== Joey Oakie ===
Joey Oakie

Cleveland Guardians
- Pitcher
- Born: May 9, 2006 (age 20); Des Moines, Iowa, U.S.
- Bats: Right Throws: Right

Joseph Edward Oakie (born May 9, 2006) is an American professional baseball pitcher in the Cleveland Guardians organization.

Oakie attended Ankeny Centennial High School in Ankeny, Iowa, where he played baseball and basketball. He was selected by the Cleveland Guardians in the third round of the 2024 Major League Baseball draft. He signed with the team for $2 million, forgoing his commitment to play college baseball for the Iowa Hawkeyes.

Oakie made his professional debut in 2025 with the Arizona Complex League Guardians. In late July, he was promoted to the Single-A Lynchburg Hillcats, with whom he ended his first professional season. Oakie appeared in 18 games (15 starts) between both clubs and pitched to a 3–4 record, a 5.31 ERA and 78 strikeouts across 59 1/3 innings. Oakie was assigned to the Single-A Hill City Howlers to open the 2026 season. In late August, he was promoted to the High-A Lake County Captains. Across 15 starts between the two teams, Oakie went 0–7 with a 7.30 ERA, 60 strikeouts, and 44 walks over 49 1/3 innings.

- Career statistics from Baseball Reference (Minors)

=== Alfonsin Rosario ===
Alfonsin Rosario

Cleveland Guardians
- Outfielder
- Born: June 21, 2004 (age 22); San Cristóbal, Dominican Republic
- Bats: Right Throws: Right

Alfonsin Rosario (born June 21, 2004) is a Dominican professional baseball outfielder in the Cleveland Guardians organization.

Rosario was born in San Cristóbal, Dominican Republic and moved to the United States when he was 16. He attended P27 Academy in Lexington, South Carolina. He was selected by the Chicago Cubs in the sixth round of the 2023 Major League Baseball draft.

Rosario made his professional debut with the Arizona Complex League Cubs and played 2024 with the Myrtle Beach Pelicans. On November 20, 2024, the Cubs traded him to the Cleveland Guardians in exchange for Eli Morgan. He opened the 2025 season with the Lake County Captains and Akron RubberDucks.

- Career statistics from Baseball Reference (Minors)

=== Khal Stephen ===
Khal Stephen

Cleveland Guardians
- Pitcher
- Born: December 21, 2002 (age 23); Danville, Illinois, U.S.
- Bats: Right Throws: Right

Michael Khalden Stephen (born December 21, 2002) is an American professional baseball pitcher in the Cleveland Guardians organization.

Stephen attended Seeger Memorial Junior-Senior High School in West Lebanon, Indiana and played college baseball at Purdue University for two years before transferring to Mississippi State University. In 2023, he played collegiate summer baseball with the Yarmouth–Dennis Red Sox of the Cape Cod Baseball League. After one year at Mississippi State, he was selected by the Toronto Blue Jays in the second round of the 2024 Major League Baseball draft.

Stephen made his professional debut in 2025 with the Dunedin Blue Jays and was promoted to the Vancouver Canadians and New Hampshire Fisher Cats during the season.

On July 31, 2025, the Blue Jays traded him to the Cleveland Guardians in exchange for Shane Bieber. He made four starts down the stretch for the Double-A Akron RubberDucks, registering an 0–1 record and 6.35 ERA with 11 strikeouts across 11 1/3 innings pitched.

Stephen made 12 starts for Akron during the 2026 campaign, compiling a 3–2 record and 3.44 ERA with 49 strikeouts over 55 innings of work. On July 5, 2026, it was announced that Stephen would require surgery to repair his ulnar collateral ligament, ruling him out for the remainder of the season.

- Career statistics from Baseball Reference (Minors)

=== Milán Tolentino ===
Milán Tolentino

Cleveland Guardians
- Infielder
- Born: November 17, 2001 (age 25); Mission Viejo, California, U.S.
- Bats: Left Throws: Right

Milán Jose Tolentino (born November 17, 2001) is an American professional baseball infielder in the Cleveland Guardians organization. He was selected by Cleveland in the fourth round, 124th overall, of the 2020 Major League Baseball draft out of Santa Margarita Catholic High School in California. Tolentino has represented the United States internationally as a member of the national under-18 baseball team.

Tolentino attended Santa Margarita Catholic High School in Rancho Santa Margarita, California. He was considered one of the better high school middle infield prospects in the 2020 draft class and committed to play college baseball at UCLA.

In 2019, Tolentino played for the United States national under-18 baseball team at the 2019 WBSC U-18 Baseball World Cup. He started all nine games at shortstop, batting .286 with eight hits, five runs scored, and four runs batted in. He also recorded 15 assists during the tournament.

During his senior season at Santa Margarita in 2020, Tolentino hit a grand slam in the team's season-opening victory over John W. North High School.

The Cleveland Indians selected Tolentino in the fourth round, with the 124th overall selection, of the 2020 Major League Baseball draft. He signed with the organization rather than attending UCLA.

Tolentino began his professional career in 2021, playing in the Arizona Complex League before receiving an assignment to the Lynchburg Hillcats of the Low-A East. He hit .269 across 48 games between the two teams.

In 2022, Tolentino played for Lynchburg before advancing to the Lake County Captains during the season. He continued with Lake County in 2023, earning a promotion to the Akron RubberDucks, Cleveland's Double-A affiliate, in August of that year.

Tolentino spent the 2024 season with Akron. He was subsequently promoted to the Columbus Clippers, Cleveland's Triple-A affiliate, for the 2025 season. He appeared in 121 games for Columbus in 2025, recording 21 home runs and 66 runs batted in.

In January 2026, the Guardians invited Tolentino to major league spring training as a non-roster player. He returned to Columbus for the 2026 season, appearing in 129 games. He batted .225 with 21 home runs, 74 runs batted in, and 20 stolen bases. On October 30, he had his contract selected to the 40-man roster.

- Career statistics from Baseball Reference (Minors)

=== Aaron Walton ===
Aaron Walton

Cleveland Guardians
- Outfielder
- Born: May 14, 2004 (age 22); Nashville, Tennessee, U.S.
- Bats: Right Throws: Right

Aaron Dean Walton (born May 14, 2004) is an American professional baseball outfielder in the Cleveland Guardians organization.

Walton attended Brentwood High School in Brentwood, Tennessee, where he earned all-state honors in football as a tight end and baseball as an outfielder as a senior in 2022. After graduating, he played two years of college baseball at Samford University. As a sophomore in 2024, he played in 56 games and batted .286 with nine home runs and 36 runs batted in (RBI). After the season, he played collegiate summer baseball with the Ocean State Waves of the New England Collegiate Baseball League. He also entered the transfer portal, and transferred to the University of Arizona. He played in 65 games for Arizona during the 2025 season and hit .320 with 14 home runs, 49 RBI, and 19 stolen bases.

Walton was selected by the Cleveland Guardians with the 66th overall pick in the 2025 Major League Baseball draft. He signed with the team for $1.1 million.

Walton made his professional debut with the Single-A Hill City Howlers with whom he hit .238 with one home run across 16 games. He was assigned to the High-A Lake County Captains to open the 2026 season. In July, Walton was promoted to the Double-A Akron RubberDucks. Across 125 games between both teams, he batted .269 with 22 home runs, 86 RBI, 36 doubles, and 33 stolen bases.

- Career statistics from Baseball Reference (Minors)
- Arizona Wildcats bio

== Full Triple-A to Rookie League rosters ==
Below are the rosters of the minor league affiliates of the Cleveland Guardians.

=== Triple-A ===
Columbus Clippers roster
Players		Coaches/Other
Pitchers: -- Aaron Davenport; 17 Trenton Denholm; 34 Jack Jasiak; 40 Ben Lively; 49 Rorik Maltrud; 12 Izaak Martinez; 31 Hunter Stanley; 38 Trevor Stephan; 44 Ryan Webb	Catchers Infielders: 4 Alex Mooney; 10 Tyresse Turner; 35 Ralphy Velazquez; Outfielders: 27 Alfonsin Rosario	Manager: 28 Andy Tracy; Coaches: 9 Matt Angle (hitting); -- Andrew Moore (pitching); 23 Daniel Robertson (bench); 15 Mac Seibert (development); 4 Ordomar Valdez (hitting); -- Nick Wittgren (pitching); 7-day injured list; * On Cleveland Guardians 40-man roster; ~ Development list; # Rehab assignment; ∞ Reserve list; ‡ Restricted list; § Suspended list; † Temporarily inactive list; Roster updated November 17, 2026; Transactions; → More rosters: MiLB • International League; → Cleveland Guardians minor league players

=== Double-A ===
Akron RubberDucks roster
Players		Coaches/Other
Pitchers: -- Rodney Boone; 28 Ryan Degges; 44 Dylan DeLucia; 34 Braylon Doughty; 40 Jay Driver; 41 Magnus Ellerts; 38 Caden Favors; 22 Franklin Gómez; 49 Zach Jacobs; -- Matt Jachec; 30 Michael Kennedy; 46 Sean Matson; 32 Zane Morehouse; 37 Carter Rustad; 39 Rafe Schlesinger; 45 Cam Schuelke; -- Khal Stephen; 36 Adam Tulloch; 29 Cam Walty	Catchers: 10 Logun Clark; 12 Bennett Thompson; Infielders: 27 Dean Curley; 1 Jake Fox; 31 Welbyn Francisca; 9 Luke Hill; 6 Christian Knapczyk; 24 Nolan Schubart; Outfielders: 4 Ryan Cesarini; 17 Jace LaViolette; 15 Aaron Walton	Manager: 26 Greg DiCenzo; Coaches: 55 Angus Adams (pitching); 48 Jordan Becker (hitting); 47 Gustavo Nava (development); 43 Cole Nieto (hitting); 54 Michael Poole (pitching); 33 Yan Rivera (bench); 7-day injured list; * On Cleveland Guardians 40-man roster; ~ Development list; # Rehab assignment; ∞ Reserve list; ‡ Restricted list; § Suspended list; † Temporarily inactive list; Roster updated November 17, 2026; Transactions; → More rosters: MiLB • Eastern League; → Cleveland Guardians minor league players

=== High-A ===
Lake County Captains roster
Players		Coaches/Other
Pitchers: -- Jervis Alfaro †; 47 Harrison Bodendorf; 35 Luke Fernandez; 32 Luis Flores; 30 Jogly Garcia; 44 Melkis Hernández; 33 Jackson Humphries; 48 Nelson Keljo; 31 Aidan Major; 40 Xavier Martinez; 22 Will McCausland; 36 Logan McGuire; 46 Joey Oakie; 17 Zane Petty; -- Kyle Scott; -- Anthony Silva; 26 Conner Whittaker; 23 Jacob Zibin; 34 Donovan Zsak	Catchers: 28 Tyler Howard; 24 Cannon Peebles; Infielders: 16 Luis De La Cruz; 7 Dauri Fernández; 10 Garrett Howe; 15 Victor Izturis; 55 Anthony Martinez; 0 Jeffrey Mercedes; 38 Riley Nelson; Outfielders: -- Jonah Advincula; 11 Juneiker Caceres; 6 Tommy Hawke; 27 José Pirela	Manager: 29 Omir Santos; Coaches: -- Bryce Ball (hitting); 4 Ian Forster (hitting); 13 Jonathan Lopez (development); 37 Shane McCarthy (pitching); 8 Eric Stamets (bench); 7-day injured list; * On Cleveland Guardians 40-man roster; ~ Development list; # Rehab assignment; ∞ Reserve list; ‡ Restricted list; § Suspended list; † Temporarily inactive list; Roster updated November 2, 2026; Transactions; → More rosters: MiLB • Midwest League; → Cleveland Guardians minor league players

=== Single-A ===
Hill City Howlers roster
Players		Coaches/Other
Pitchers: 30 Ryan Bilka; 21 Evan Chrest; 29 Parker Coil; 38 Ryan DeSanto; 39 Parker Dillhoff; 34 Miguel Flores; 37 Will Hynes; 35 Carson Lane; 27 Manuel Osorio; 43 Angel Pérez; 23 Erigaldi Perez; 40 Ryan Prager; 36 Harrison Ruiz; 41 Aaron Savary; 31 Javi Torres; 25 Keegan Zinn	Catchers: 22 Pedro Delmagro; 13 Reiner Herrera; 46 Deiten Lachance; Infielders: 1 Angel Abreu; 16 Jhorvic Abreus; 7 Ben Cleary; 6 Alejandro Garza; 11 Jonathan Martínez; 24 Luis Merejo; 15 Gabriel Rodriguez; 4 Johan Rodriguez; Outfielders: -- Robert Arias; 5 Alejandro Blasco; 32 Tre Broussard; 2 Yeiferth Castillo; 8 Erick Dessens; 9 Lucas Moore	Manager: 10 Erlin Cerda; Coaches: 3 Chase Barbary (bench); 12 Kevin Erminio (pitching); 33 Il Hor (hitting); 47 Amanda Kamekona (hitting); 7-day injured list; * On Cleveland Guardians 40-man roster; ~ Development list; # Rehab assignment; ∞ Reserve list; ‡ Restricted list; § Suspended list; † Temporarily inactive list; Roster updated November 2, 2026; Transactions; → More rosters: MiLB • Carolina League; → Cleveland Guardians minor league players

=== Rookie ===
Arizona Complex League Guardians roster
Players		Coaches/Other
Pitchers: -- Tyler Albanese; -- Heath Andrews; 39 Randy Baron; -- Jake Bean; 71 Hector Castillo; -- Zac Cowan; -- Pablo Figueroa; -- Alexander Garcia; -- Luke House; -- Travis Lutz; 40 Jonaikel Meza; -- Chase Mobley; 52 Derek Munoz; 64 Santiago Peraza; 51 Edelvis Perez; 65 Joelvis Perez; -- Mario Pesca; -- Liam Peterson; 45 Renil Ramos; -- Jacob Remily; -- Sebastian Rolon; -- Matt Scott; -- Savion Sims; -- Cameron Sullivan; 44 Erich Tovar	Catchers: 13 Gustavo Baptista; 24 Sebastian Cadiz; 4 Wuinder Torres; Infielders: 23 Steven Cruz; 29 Carlos Garces; -- Kade Lewis; 17 Randy Martinez; 41 Luis Rodriguez; 12 Ricardo Romero; 1 Rodny Rosario; Outfielders	Manager: 9 Juan De La Cruz; Coaches: -- Beau Dorman (assistant); 43 Brandon League (pitching); 35 Ronald Parra (pitching); 6 Jason Rose (hitting); 27 Mike Snow (hitting); 2 Chaz Verduzco (bench); 7-day injured list; * On Cleveland Guardians 40-man roster; ~ Development list; # Rehab assignment; ∞ Reserve list; ‡ Restricted list; § Suspended list; † Temporarily inactive list; Roster updated November 2, 2026; → More rosters: MiLB • Arizona Complex League; → Cleveland Guardians minor league players

=== Foreign Rookie ===
Dominican Summer League Guardians Goryl roster
Players		Coaches/Other
Pitchers: -- Anthony Alcantara; 73 Wilinyer Ardiles; 75 Ronny Arias; 62 Cristofer Brujan; 56 Antony Carela; 72 Jose Cedeño; 70 Angel Cordova; 60 Luis Dorante; 58 Yoshtner Farfan; 67 Daniel Gentile; 34 Antonio Gonzalez; 50 Jhordari Jiminez; 29 Victor Marin; 22 Juan Poche; 80 Deiker Rojas; 52 Jesus Rojas; 48 Julio J Rossi; 46 Amilcar Teran; 16 Juan Yan	Catchers: 28 Robert Alvarez; 27 Carlos Martinez; 44 Yorwhuyn Toledo; 24 Santiago Ustariz; Infielders: 30 Israel Alvarez; 32 Heins Brito; 45 Diego Fernandez; 7 Rafeliz Lara; 23 Jhoseph Leta; 65 Raynel Quezada; 2 Svert Reinoso; Outfielders: 40 Oswaldo Bracho; 38 Carlos Caripa; 53 Cesar Nivar; 54 Freilyn Rodriguez; 55 Osmar Torrealba	Manager: -- Justin Devoid; Coaches: -- Carlos Fermin (bench); -- Jonathan Lozada (hitting); -- Anderson Polanco (pitching); -- Jose Rincon (catching); 7-day injured list; * On Cleveland Guardians 40-man roster; ~ Development list; # Rehab assignment; ∞ Reserve list; ‡ Restricted list; § Suspended list; † Temporarily inactive list; Roster updated November 18, 2026; → More rosters: MiLB • Dominican Summer League; → Cleveland Guardians minor league players

Dominican Summer League Guardians Mendoza roster
Players		Coaches/Other
Pitchers: 64 Enderson Amaya; 84 Jhonaiker Castillo; 66 Handrychson Colina; 88 Jesus Colmenarez; 72 Victor De Jesus; 24 Edwing Fernandez; 68 Oscar Melgarejo; 82 Antwan Montana; -- Abraham Negrin; 51 Christopher Peralta; 34 Andres Perez; 50 Josh Perez; 63 Johander Rivero; 74 Wilfi Rodriguez; 77 Julio M Rossi	Catchers: 41 Pablo Arosemena; 8 Hiverson López; 1 Sebastian Puche; Infielders: 17 Luis Galan; 23 Luis Garcia; 58 Jose Marcano; 99 Jostin Melo; 33 Karel Naranjo; 57 Wilber Reinoso; 43 Jose Riera; 4 Jefferson Vargas; Outfielders: -- Marcos Belen ‡; 44 Sebastian Espinoza; 75 Yhon Guerrero	Manager: -- Dilson Herrera; Coaches: -- Cristobal Rodriguez (hitting); -- Jesús Tavárez (bench); -- Carlos Yan (pitching); 7-day injured list; * On Cleveland Guardians 40-man roster; ~ Development list; # Rehab assignment; ∞ Reserve list; ‡ Restricted list; § Suspended list; † Temporarily inactive list; Roster updated November 2, 2026; → More rosters: MiLB • Dominican Summer League; → Cleveland Guardians minor league players
