= Braden Olthoff =

American baseball player (born 1999)

- Pitcher
- Born: March 12, 1999 (age 26); Oceanside, California, U.S.
- Bats: Right Throws: Right

Braden Richard Olthoff (born March 12, 1999) is an American former professional baseball pitcher.

== Career ==
Olthoff attended El Camino High School in Oceanside, California and played college baseball at Palomar College and Tulane University. During his first year at Tulane in 2020, he started four games and went 4-0 with a 0.32 ERA over 28 innings before the season was cancelled due to the COVID-19 pandemic. He returned to the starting rotation in 2021. He finished the season 6–3 with a 3.78 ERA, 91 strikeouts, and 11 walks. He was selected by the Los Angeles Angels in the ninth round of the 2021 Major League Baseball draft.

Olthoff signed with the Angels, and split his first professional season between the Arizona Complex League Angels and Inland Empire 66ers. Over five starts, he went 0-2 with a 5.94 ERA and 26 strikeouts over 16 2/3 innings pitched. He opened the 2022 season with the Tri-City Dust Devils and was promoted to the Rocket City Trash Pandas in late May. Over 23 games (17 starts) between the two teams, he posted a 5-9 record with a 4.15 ERA and 73 strikeouts over 108 1/3 innings.

Olthoff was placed on the 60-day injured list on April 18, 2023 due to a tear in his shoulder capsule. He did not pitch in 2023 before announcing his retirement on August 21.
