= Josh Hartle =

American baseball player (born 2003)

Washington Nationals
- Pitcher
- Born: March 24, 2003 (age 23); King, North Carolina, U.S.
- Bats: Left Throws: Left
- Stats at Baseball Reference

Joshua Beau Hartle (born March 24, 2003) is an American professional baseball pitcher in the Washington Nationals organization.

== Amateur career ==
Hartle attended Ronald W. Reagan High School in Pfafftown, North Carolina. As a senior in 2021, he was the North Carolina Gatorade Baseball Player of the Year after going 8–0 with a 0.60 earned run average (ERA) and 82 strikeouts. He withdrew his name from the 2021 Major League Baseball draft, and committed to Wake Forest University to play college baseball.

As a freshman at Wake Forest in 2022, Hartle started 14 games, going 7–6 with a 5.30 ERA and 54 strikeouts over 69 2/3 innings pitched. In 2022, he played collegiate summer baseball with the Falmouth Commodores of the Cape Cod Baseball League. As a sophomore in 2023, he helped lead Wake Forest to the College World Series. He finished the season 11–2 with a 2.81 ERA and 140 strikeouts in 1/3 over 18 games. He was named a first team All-American by Baseball America and the National Collegiate Baseball Writers Association (NCBWA).

Hartle entered his junior season in 2024 as a top prospect for the 2024 Major League Baseball draft.

== Professional career ==
=== Pittsburgh Pirates ===
The Pittsburgh Pirates selected Hartle in the third round, with the 83rd overall selection, of the 2024 Major League Baseball draft. On July 23, 2024, Hartle signed with Pittsburgh on a contract worth $850,000. He made his professional debut with the Single–A Bradenton Marauders.

=== Cleveland Guardians ===
On December 10, 2024, Hartle, alongside Michael Kennedy and Luis Ortiz, was traded to the Cleveland Guardians in exchange for Spencer Horwitz.

=== Washington Nationals ===
The Guardians traded Hartle to the Washington Nationals as part of a four-player package for starting pitcher Foster Griffin on August 3, 2026.
