= Quincy Hamilton =

American baseball player (born 1998)

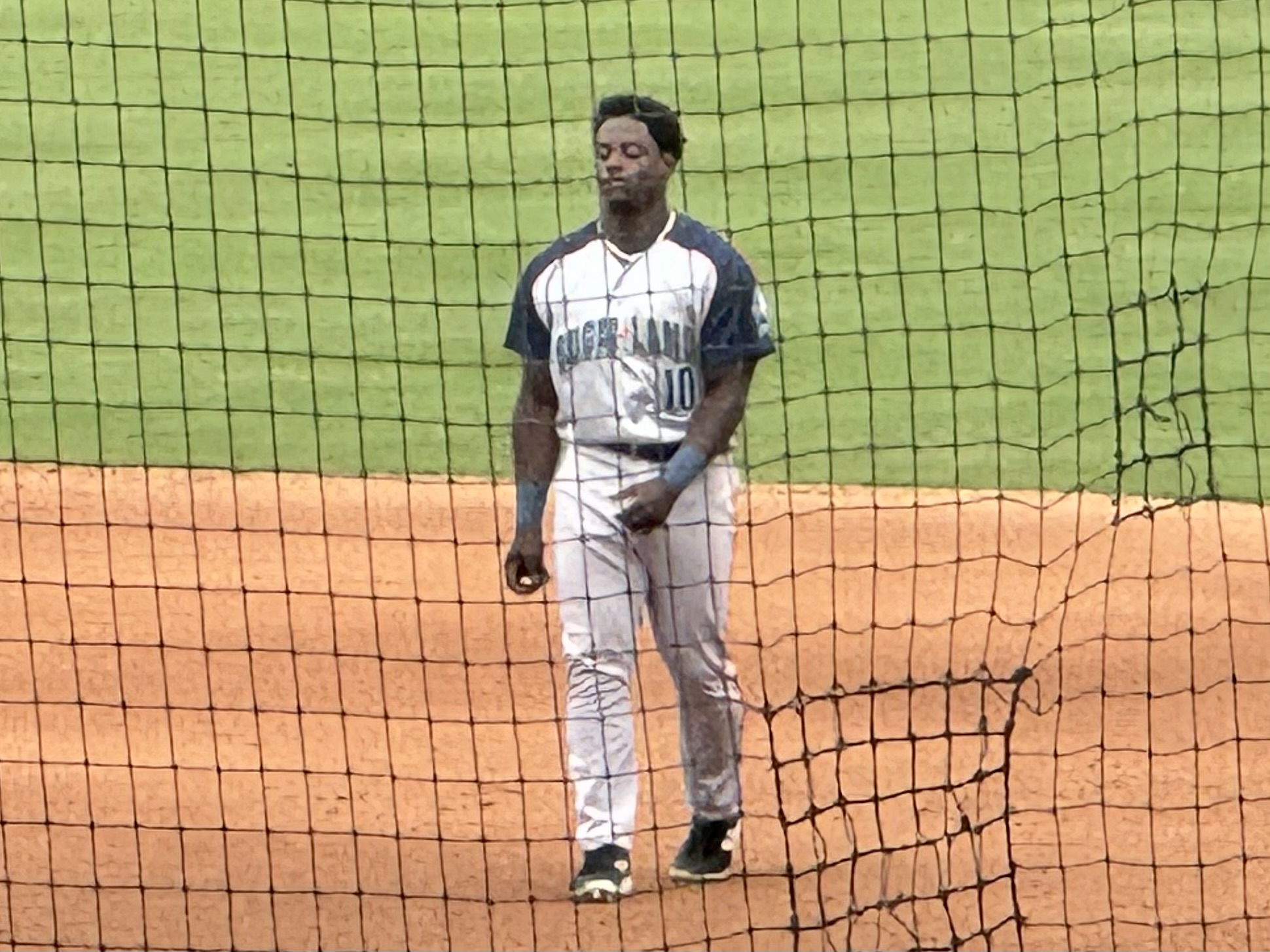
- Hamilton with the Sugar Land Space Cowboys
- Outfielder
- Born: June 12, 1998 (age 28); Anchorage, Alaska, U.S.
- Bats: Left Throws: Left

Quincy Rashaad Hamilton (born June 12, 1998) is an American former professional baseball outfielder. He played college baseball for the Wright State Raiders.

== Career ==
=== Amateur ===
Hamilton played college baseball at Wright State for four seasons. He batted .357 in 11 games during his sophomore season in 2020 before it was cut short due to the coronavirus pandemic. Hamilton was named the Horizon League Player of the Year after batting .374 with 15 home runs, 65 RBI, and a .535 on-base percentage.

=== Houston Astros ===
Hamilton was selected in the fifth round (148th overall) of the 2021 Major League Baseball draft by the Houston Astros. After signing with the team he was assigned to the Fayetteville Woodpeckers of the Low-A East. Hamilton returned to Fayetteville at the beginning of the 2022 season. He slashed .291/.400/.485 and was leading the team with 39 hits, six home runs, 19 RBI, and 22 runs scored through 32 games before being promoted to the High-A Asheville Tourists. Hamilton was promoted a second time to the Double-A Corpus Christi Hooks.

Hamilton split the 2023 season between Corpus Christi and the Triple-A Sugar Land Space Cowboys. In 72 appearances for the two affiliates, he batted .250/.350/.442 with 13 home runs, 50 RBI, and six RBI. Hamilton returned to the two affiliates for the 2024 campaign, playing in 117 total games and hitting .229/.344/.424 with 16 home runs, 61 RBI, and 11 stolen bases.

Hamilton made 59 appearances for the Triple-A Sugar Land Space Cowboys in 2025, slashing .157/.254/.288 with six home runs, 23 RBI, and five stolen bases. Hamilton was released by the Astros organization on July 30, 2025.

=== Lancaster Stormers ===
On August 31, 2025, Hamilton signed with the Lancaster Stormers of the Atlantic League of Professional Baseball. He made 13 appearances for Lancaster, slashing .170/.298/.362 with three home runs, eight RBI, and one stolen base.

On February 23, 2026, Hamilton announced his retirement from professional baseball via an Instagram post.
