= Will Bednar =

American baseball player (born 2000)

San Francisco Giants
- Pitcher
- Born: June 13, 2000 (age 26); Pittsburgh, Pennsylvania, U.S.
- Bats: Right Throws: Right
- Stats at Baseball Reference

William Ross Bednar (born June 13, 2000) is an American professional baseball pitcher in the San Francisco Giants organization. He played college baseball for the Mississippi State Bulldogs.

== Amateur career ==
Bednar attended Mars Area High School in Mars, Pennsylvania, where he played baseball under his father, Andy. He originally committed to play college baseball at Ohio State University, but later switched his commitment to Mississippi State University. As a sophomore in 2017, he spent a majority of the season catching, and pitched only around 15 innings. In 2018, as a junior, he switched to pitching full time and went 8–0 with a 0.64 ERA and 120 strikeouts over 66 innings. As a senior in 2019, his playing time was limited due to a shoulder issue. Bednar was not selected in the 2019 Major League Baseball draft, and thus enrolled at Mississippi State.

In 2020, Bednar's freshman year at Mississippi State, he pitched 15 1/3 innings, striking out 23 and compiling a 1.76 ERA before the remainder of the season was cancelled due to the COVID-19 pandemic. As a sophomore in 2021, he moved into the starting rotation, going 7–1 with a 3.17 ERA and 109 strikeouts over 15 games (12 starts) for the regular season. He was named to the Newcomer All-SEC Team. During game three of the 2021 College World Series, Bednar pitched six innings in which he allowed three walks and zero hits while striking out four, subsequently being named the College World Series Most Outstanding Player as Mississippi State won their first ever College World Series. For the 2021 College World Series, Bednar pitched to a 1.47 ERA over 18 1/3 innings. Over 19 games for the season, he went 9-1 with a 3.12 ERA and 139 strikeouts in 92 1/3 innings.

== Professional career ==
The San Francisco Giants selected Bednar in the first round, with the 14th overall selection, of the 2021 Major League Baseball draft. He signed for $3.65 million. He made his professional debut with the Rookie-level Arizona Complex League Giants, and was promoted to the San Jose Giants of the Low-A West after two appearances. He pitched a total of seven innings for the season, striking out six while allowing one earned run.

Bednar opened the 2022 season ranked as San Francisco's fourth best prospect. He returned to San Jose to begin the season. In mid-June, he was placed on the injured list with a back injury and missed the remainder of the season. Over 12 starts for the season, he went 1–3 with a 4.19 ERA, 51 strikeouts, and 22 walks over 43 innings. He was selected to play in the Arizona Fall League for the Scottsdale Scorpions after the season. Bednar pitched in only four games in 2023 due to back injuries. He was assigned to the Arizona Fall League for the second year in a row after the season.

In 2024, Bednar appeared in 32 games (13 starts) between San Jose, the High-A Eugene Emeralds, and the Double-A Richmond Flying Squirrels, going 2-4 with a 6.00 ERA and 76 strikeouts over 54 innings. He was eligible for the 2024 Rule 5 draft but went unselected. He was assigned back to Richmond to open the 2025 season and also pitched in two games for the Triple-A Sacramento River Cats. Over 38 relief appearances for the season, Bednar went 2–3 with a 5.68 ERA and 84 strikeouts over 52 1/3 innings. In 2026, he played with Richmond and Sacramento, making 38 appearances and going 5–2 with a 4.50 ERA and 76 strikeouts over 64 innings.

== Personal life ==
Bednar's older brother, David, plays in MLB.
