= Benny Montgomery =

American baseball player (born 2002)

- Outfielder
- Born: September 9, 2002 (age 24); Paoli, Pennsylvania, U.S.
- Bats: Right Throws: Right

Benjamin Dennis Montgomery (born September 9, 2002) is an American former professional baseball outfielder. He was drafted by the Colorado Rockies with the 8th overall selection of the 2021 Major League Baseball draft.

== Amateur career ==
Montgomery grew up in Bloomsburg, Pennsylvania until moving to Lewisberry, Pennsylvania when he was in middle school. He attended Red Land High School. As a sophomore, he batted .359 with 23 RBIs as the Patriots won the AAAAA State Championship. Montgomery committed to play college baseball at the University of Virginia over offers from Stanford University, Duke University and the University of North Carolina earlier in his sophomore year. His junior season in 2020 was canceled due to the COVID-19 pandemic and he played in the Perfect Game All-America game that summer, where he won the event's home run derby. Montgomery also played in the East Coast Professional Showcase, the Area Code Games, and the Baseball Factory All-Star Classic. Montgomery entered senior season as the top collegiate outfield prospect and as a top prospect for the upcoming Major League Baseball draft. In 2021, as a senior, he led Red Land to the AAAAA State Championship game again and was named the Pennsylvania Gatorade Player of the Year. He ended his senior year batting .420 with seven home runs, 22 RBIs, and 19 stolen bases.

== Professional career ==
Montgomery was selected by the Colorado Rockies with the eighth overall pick in the 2021 Major League Baseball draft. Montgomery signed with the Rockies for a bonus of $5 million. Montgomery was assigned to the Rookie-level Arizona Complex League Rockies to start his professional career and batted .340 over 14 games. He opened the 2022 season with the Fresno Grizzlies of the Single-A California League.

Montgomery spent the 2023 season with the High–A Spokane Indians, playing in 109 games and batting .251/.336/.370 with 10 home runs, 51 RBI, and 18 stolen bases.

Montgomery was assigned to the Double–A Hartford Yard Goats to begin the 2024 season. In 11 appearances, he hit .283/.313/.500 with two home runs, 10 RBI, and three stolen bases. On May 12, 2024, Montgomery underwent surgery to repair a left shoulder injury. On June 21, 2026, Montgomery retired while in his third straight season at AA Hartford.
