= Roc Riggio =

American baseball player (born 2002)

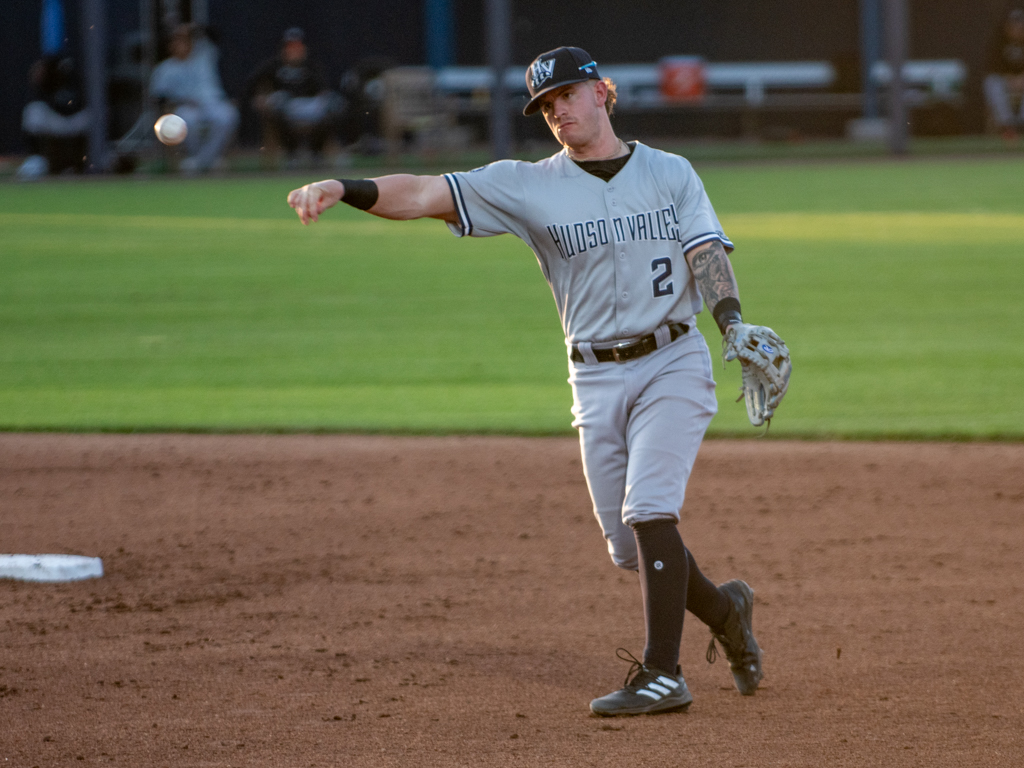
- Riggio with the Hudson Valley Renegades in 2024

Colorado Rockies
- Second baseman
- Born: June 11, 2002 (age 23); Tarzana, California, U.S.
- Bats: Left Throws: Right

Roc Jack Riggio (born June 11, 2002) is an American professional baseball second baseman in the Colorado Rockies organization. He played college baseball for the Oklahoma State Cowboys.

== Amateur career ==
Riggio began playing for the USA Baseball when he was 11 years old. After playing as a catcher, third baseman, and outfielder, Riggio worked with retired Major League Baseball (MLB) shortstop Jack Wilson to become a second baseman, first by taking thousands of ground balls on his own, and later training with Wilson's son, shortstop Jacob Wilson. While he was in the eighth grade at Grace Brethren School, Riggio committed to attend the University of California, Los Angeles to play college baseball.

Riggio attended Chaminade College Preparatory School in Los Angeles for his freshman year of high school. He transferred to Thousand Oaks High School in Thousand Oaks, California, to play for Wilson, who became the baseball team's head coach. In November 2020, Riggio signed a National Letter of Intent with Oklahoma State University to play college baseball for the Oklahoma State Cowboys.

The Milwaukee Brewers selected Riggio in the 11th round of the 2021 MLB draft. He chose not to sign with the Brewers and enrolled at Oklahoma State. As a freshman in 2022, Riggio batted .295 with 11 home runs and 47 RBI. He batted .555 in the 2022 NCAA Division I baseball tournament. After the Cowboys' season, he played collegiate summer baseball for the Chatham Anglers of the Cape Cod Baseball League. In 2023, his sophomore year, Riggio batted .333 with 18 home runs and 64 RBI.

== Professional career ==
=== New York Yankees ===
The New York Yankees selected Riggio in the fourth round (129th overall) of the 2023 Major League Baseball draft. He signed with the Yankees for a $693,000 signing bonus. After he signed, he played for the Tampa Tarpons of the Single-A Florida State League. In 2024, the Yankees assigned him to the Hudson Valley Renegades of the High-A South Atlantic League.

In 2025, Riggio made appearances for the rookie-level Florida Complex League Yankees, Hudson Valley, and the Double-A Somerset Patriots.

=== Colorado Rockies ===
On July 31, 2025, the Yankees traded Riggio and Ben Shields to the Colorado Rockies in exchange for pitcher Jake Bird.

== Personal life ==
Riggio's father, Jayme, played college baseball at The Master's University. He built a batting cage at their home in Simi Valley, California, to train with Roc.
