= Lonnie White =

American baseball player

Pittsburgh Pirates
- Outfielder
- Born: December 31, 2002 (age 23); Las Vegas, Nevada, U.S.
- Bats: Right Throws: Right
- Stats at Baseball Reference

Lonnie Edward White Jr. (born December 31, 2002) is an American professional baseball outfielder in the Pittsburgh Pirates organization.

== Amateur career ==
White grew up in Coatesville, Pennsylvania, and attended Malvern Preparatory School, where he played baseball, basketball, and football. As a sophomore, he batted .283 with six doubles, four home runs and 25 RBIs in 33 games. White initially committed to play college baseball at Clemson University, but later committed to play college football at Penn State University during his junior year over offers from the University of Michigan, Michigan State University, and Syracuse University, among others.

As a senior in football, White caught 17 passes for 369 yards and five touchdowns in four games played. In baseball, he batted .395 with five home runs, 11 doubles, 25 RBIs, 36 runs scored and 26 stolen bases. White's performance as a senior led him to be considered a top prospect in the upcoming MLB draft.

== Professional career ==
White was selected in the Competitive Balance Round B round with the 64th overall pick in the 2021 Major League Baseball draft by the Pittsburgh Pirates. He signed with the team for a $1.5 million signing bonus. He made his professional debut with the Rookie-level Florida Complex League Pirates, batting .258 with two home runs over nine games.

== Personal life ==
White's father, Lonnie White, Sr., played college basketball at East Stroudsburg University, where his mother was also a softball player.
