= Alex Binelas =

American baseball player (born 2000)

Free agent
- Third baseman
- Born: May 26, 2000 (age 26); Oak Creek, Wisconsin, U.S.
- Bats: Left Throws: Right

Alexander James Binelas (born May 26, 2000) is an American professional baseball third baseman who is a free agent.

== Amateur career ==
Binelas attended Oak Creek High School in Oak Creek, Wisconsin. In 2018, his senior year, he was named Player of the Year by the Greater Metro Conference and the Wisconsin Baseball Coaches Association after batting .508 with four home runs while also pitching to a 1.94 ERA. He was selected by the Washington Nationals in the 35th round of the 2018 Major League Baseball draft, but did not sign, instead choosing to honor his college commitment to play baseball at the University of Louisville.

In 2019, Binelas' freshman season at Louisville, he played in 59 games (making 54 starts), hitting .291 with 14 home runs and 59 RBIs. He was named a Freshman All-American by multiple media outlets including Collegiate Baseball Newspaper and the National Collegiate Baseball Writers Association. After the season, he was invited to play for the USA Baseball Collegiate National Team, joining teammates Reid Detmers, Bobby Miller, and Michael Kirian. As a sophomore in 2020, Binelas appeared in two games before suffering a hamate injury to his right hand, missing time due to the injury before the season was cancelled due to the COVID-19 pandemic. In 2021, his junior season, he batted .256/.348/.621 with 19 home runs and 63 RBIs over fifty games.

== Professional career ==
=== Milwaukee Brewers ===
Binelas was selected by the Milwaukee Brewers in the third round with the 86th overall selection of the 2021 Major League Baseball draft. He signed for a $700,000 signing bonus. He made his professional debut with the Rookie-level Arizona Complex League Brewers before being promoted to the Carolina Mudcats of the Low-A East. Over 36 games between the two clubs, he slashed .309/.390/.583 with nine home runs, 29 RBI, and 11 doubles.

=== Boston Red Sox ===
On December 1, 2021, Binelas, David Hamilton, and Jackie Bradley Jr. were traded to the Boston Red Sox in exchange for Hunter Renfroe. Binelas was assigned to the Greenville Drive of the High-A South Atlantic League to begin the 2022 season. In late June, he was promoted to the Portland Sea Dogs of the Double-A Eastern League. Over 113 games between the two teams, he batted .206 with 25 home runs, 78 RBI, and twenty doubles.

Binelas returned to Portland for the 2023 season, batting .223 with 16 home runs and 52 RBI over 82 games. Binelas spent a majority of the 2024 season with Portland and played three games with the Worcester Red Sox at the end of the season. Over 91 games between the two teams, he batted .252 with nine home runs and sixty RBI.

Binelas began the 2025 campaign with Triple-A Worcester, playing in 13 games and batting .257/.366/.457 with two home runs, six RBI, and one stolen base. On May 23, 2025, Binelas was released by the Red Sox organization.

=== Philadelphia Phillies ===
On May 26, 2025, Binelas signed a minor league contract with the Philadelphia Phillies. He was assigned to the Double-A Reading Fightin Phils and hit .265 with eight home runs and 37 RBI over 68 games. In 2026, Binelas played with Reading for the majority of the season and batted .267 with 26 home runs and 78 RBI. He was promoted to the Triple-A Lehigh Valley IronPigs but played only three games before an injury ended his season. He elected free agency on November 2.
