= Ralphy Velazquez =

American baseball player (born 2005)

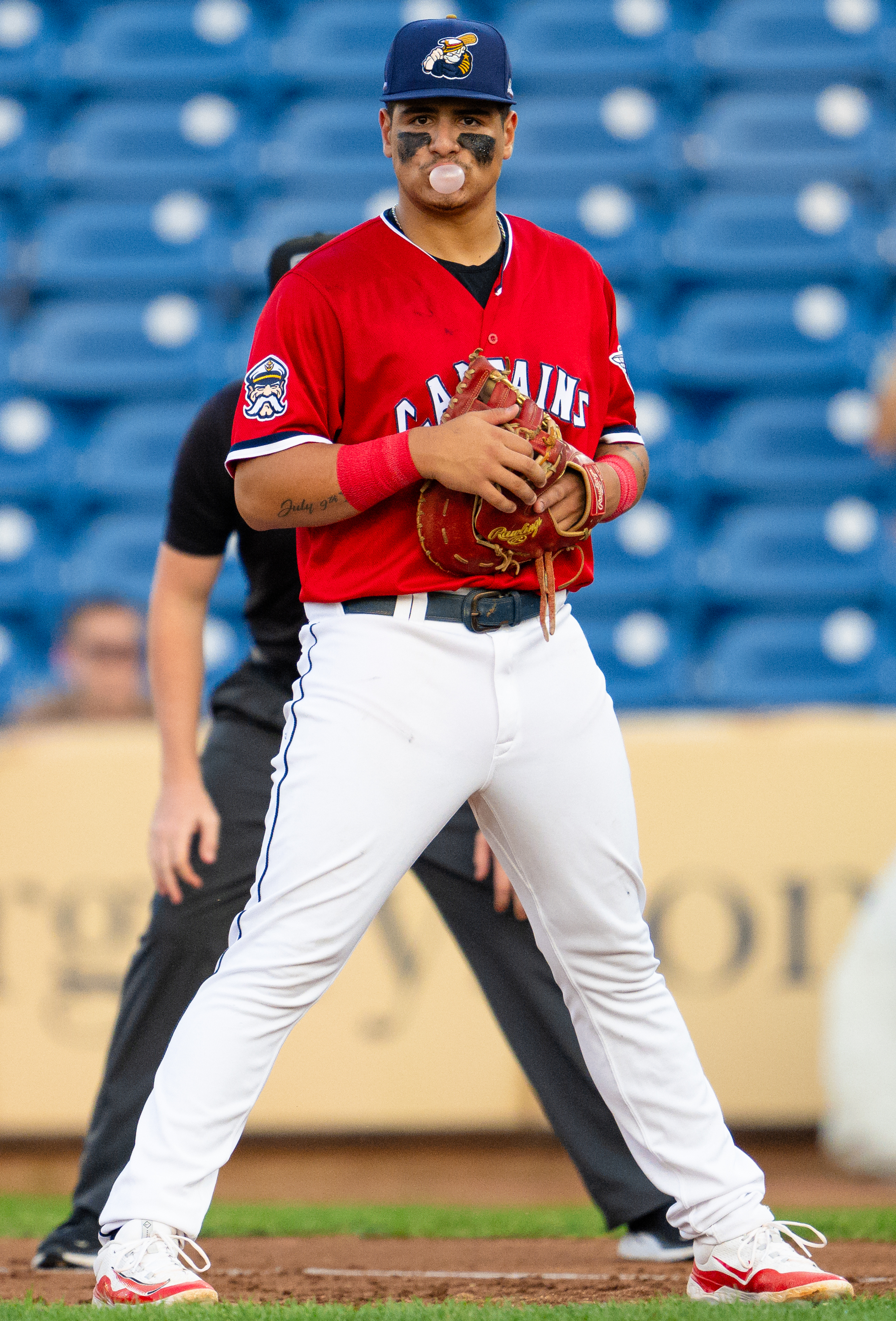
- Velazquez with the Lake County Captains in 2024

Cleveland Guardians
- First baseman
- Born: May 28, 2005 (age 21); San Pedro, California, U.S.
- Bats: Left Throws: Right
- Stats at Baseball Reference
Medals
Men's baseball
Representing United States
U-12 Baseball World Cup
Gold medal – first place	2017 Tainan	Team

Raffaele Javier "Ralphy" Velazquez (born May 28, 2005) is an American professional baseball first baseman in the Cleveland Guardians organization.

== Amateur career ==
Velazquez played for the 12U United States national baseball team in 2017. He attended Huntington Beach High School. As a junior in 2022, he hit .316 with nine home runs and 25 RBI. As a senior in 2023, he batted .402 with six home runs. He committed to play college baseball at Arizona State University.

== Professional career ==
Velazquez was selected by the Cleveland Guardians in the first round with the 23rd overall pick in the 2023 Major League Baseball draft. On July 22, 2023, Velazquez signed with Cleveland for a below slot deal worth $2.5 million.

Velazquez made his professional debut with the Arizona Complex League Guardians, hitting .348 over six games. He opened the 2024 season with the Lynchburg Hillcats. Velazquez was selected to represent the Guardians (alongside Jaison Chourio) in the All-Star Futures Game at Globe Life Field. In August, he was promoted to the Lake County Captains. Over 101 games for the 2024 season, Velazquez batted .231 with 11 home runs and 61 RBI. He was assigned back to Lake County to open the 2025 season. In August, he was promoted to the Akron RubberDucks. Over 122 games between the two teams, Velazquez hit .265 with 22 home runs, 85 RBI, and 28 doubles.

Velazquez returned to Akron to open the 2026 season. Across 36 games with Akron, he hit .317 with seven home runs and 30 RBI before he was promoted to the Columbus Clippers on May 18. Velazquez was selected to represent the Guardians at the 2026 All-Star Futures Game. He played in 85 games with Columbus and batted .278 with 22 home runs and 63 RBI.
