= 2021 Major League Baseball draft =

Major League Baseball draft

General information
- Date: July 11–13, 2021
- Location: Bellco Theatre; Denver, Colorado
- Networks: MLB Network; ESPN (first round)

Overview
- 612 total selections in 20 rounds
- First selection: Henry Davis; Pittsburgh Pirates
- First round selections: 36

The 2021 Major League Baseball draft took place on July 11–13, 2021. In conjunction with the 2021 Major League Baseball All-Star Game, the draft was held in Denver. The draft assigned amateur baseball players to MLB teams. The draft order was set based on the reverse order of the 2020 MLB season standings. In addition, compensation picks were distributed for players who did not sign from the 2020 MLB draft and for teams who lost qualifying free agents. On March 26, 2020, MLB and the MLBPA reached a deal that included the option to halve the draft to 20 rounds due to the COVID-19 pandemic. MLB ultimately opted to shorten the draft to 20 rounds. In total, 612 college and high school players were drafted.

The Pittsburgh Pirates, who had the worst record of the 2020 season, selected Henry Davis with the first overall pick in the draft. As punishment for their role in the sign stealing scandal, the Houston Astros forfeited both their first- and second-round picks in the draft.

On April 2, 2021, MLB announced that the 2021 MLB All-Star Game, along with the draft, was being relocated from Atlanta in protest of the Georgia State Legislature's passage of the Election Integrity Act of 2021; three days later, Denver was announced as the new host city.

Chase Silseth made his MLB debut for the Los Angeles Angels on May 13, 2022, making him the first player from the 2021 draft to make his major league debut.

== Draft selections ==
The deadline for teams to sign drafted players was August 1, 2021.

Key
	All-Star
*	Player did not sign

=== First round ===
Pick	Player	Team	Position	School
1	Henry Davis	Pittsburgh Pirates	Catcher	Louisville
2	Jack Leiter	Texas Rangers	Pitcher	Vanderbilt
3	Jackson Jobe	Detroit Tigers	Pitcher	Heritage Hall School (OK)
4	Marcelo Mayer	Boston Red Sox	Shortstop	Eastlake High School (CA)
5	Colton Cowser	Baltimore Orioles	Outfielder	Sam Houston State
6	Jordan Lawlar	Arizona Diamondbacks	Shortstop	Jesuit Dallas (TX)
7	Frank Mozzicato	Kansas City Royals	Pitcher	East Catholic High School (CT)
8	Benny Montgomery	Colorado Rockies	Outfielder	Red Land High School (PA)
9	Sam Bachman	Los Angeles Angels	Pitcher	Miami (OH)
10	Kumar Rocker*	New York Mets	Pitcher	Vanderbilt
11	Brady House	Washington Nationals	Shortstop	Winder-Barrow High School (GA)
12	Harry Ford	Seattle Mariners	Catcher	North Cobb High School (GA)
13	Andrew Painter	Philadelphia Phillies	Pitcher	Calvary Christian Academy (FL)
14	Will Bednar	San Francisco Giants	Pitcher	Mississippi State
15	Sal Frelick	Milwaukee Brewers	Outfielder	Boston College
16	Kahlil Watson	Miami Marlins	Shortstop	Wake Forest High School (NC)
17	Matt McLain	Cincinnati Reds	Shortstop	UCLA
18	Michael McGreevy	St. Louis Cardinals	Pitcher	UC Santa Barbara
19	Gunnar Hoglund	Toronto Blue Jays	Pitcher	Ole Miss
20	Trey Sweeney	New York Yankees	Shortstop	Eastern Illinois University (IL)
21	Jordan Wicks	Chicago Cubs	Pitcher	Kansas State
22	Colson Montgomery	Chicago White Sox	Shortstop	Southridge High School (IN)
23	Gavin Williams	Cleveland Indians	Pitcher	East Carolina
24	Ryan Cusick	Atlanta Braves	Pitcher	Wake Forest
25	Max Muncy	Oakland Athletics	Shortstop	Thousand Oaks High School (CA)
26	Chase Petty	Minnesota Twins	Pitcher	Mainland Regional High School (NJ)
27	Jackson Merrill	San Diego Padres	Shortstop	Severna Park High School (MD)
28	Carson Williams	Tampa Bay Rays	Shortstop	Torrey Pines High School (CA)
29	Maddux Bruns	Los Angeles Dodgers	Pitcher	UMS-Wright Preparatory School (AL)

=== Compensatory round ===
Pick	Player	Team	Position	School
30	Jay Allen	Cincinnati Reds (Note: Compensation pick for the Los Angeles Dodgers signing Trevor Bauer)	Outfielder	John Carroll Catholic High School (FL)

=== Competitive balance round A ===
Pick	Player	Team	Position	School
31	Joe Mack	Miami Marlins	Catcher	Williamsville East High School (NY)
32	Ty Madden	Detroit Tigers	Pitcher	Texas
33	Tyler Black	Milwaukee Brewers	Second baseman	Wright State
34	Cooper Kinney	Tampa Bay Rays	Second baseman	Baylor School (TN)
35	Matheu Nelson	Cincinnati Reds	Catcher	Florida State
36	Noah Miller	Minnesota Twins	Shortstop	Ozaukee High School (WI)

=== Second round ===
Pick	Player	Team	Position	School
37	Anthony Solometo	Pittsburgh Pirates	Pitcher	Bishop Eustace Preparatory School (NJ)
38	Aaron Zavala	Texas Rangers	Outfielder	Oregon
39	Izaac Pacheco	Detroit Tigers	Third baseman	Friendswood High School (TX)
40	Jud Fabian*	Boston Red Sox	Outfielder	Florida
41	Connor Norby	Baltimore Orioles	Second baseman	East Carolina
42	Ryan Bliss	Arizona Diamondbacks	Shortstop	Auburn
43	Ben Kudrna	Kansas City Royals	Pitcher	Blue Valley Southwest High School (KS)
44	Jaden Hill	Colorado Rockies	Pitcher	LSU
45	Ky Bush	Los Angeles Angels	Pitcher	Saint Mary's
46	Calvin Ziegler	New York Mets	Pitcher	TNXL Academy (FL)
47	Daylen Lile	Washington Nationals	Outfielder	Trinity High School (KY)
48	Edwin Arroyo	Seattle Mariners	Shortstop	Arecibo Baseball Academy (PR)
49	Ethan Wilson	Philadelphia Phillies	Outfielder	South Alabama
50	Matt Mikulski	San Francisco Giants	Pitcher	Fordham
51	Russell Smith	Milwaukee Brewers	Pitcher	TCU
52	Cody Morissette	Miami Marlins	Shortstop	Boston College
53	Andrew Abbott	Cincinnati Reds	Pitcher	Virginia
54	Joshua Báez	St. Louis Cardinals	Outfielder	Dexter Southfield School (MA)
55	Brendan Beck	New York Yankees	Pitcher	Stanford
56	James Triantos	Chicago Cubs	Third baseman	James Madison High School (VA)
57	Wes Kath	Chicago White Sox	Third baseman	Desert Mountain High School (AZ)
58	Doug Nikhazy	Cleveland Indians	Pitcher	Ole Miss
59	Spencer Schwellenbach	Atlanta Braves	Pitcher	Nebraska
60	Zack Gelof	Oakland Athletics	Third baseman	Virginia
61	Steve Hajjar	Minnesota Twins	Pitcher	Michigan
62	James Wood	San Diego Padres	Outfielder	IMG Academy (FL)
63	Kyle Manzardo	Tampa Bay Rays	First baseman	Washington State

=== Competitive balance round B ===
Pick	Player	Team	Position	School
64	Lonnie White	Pittsburgh Pirates	Outfielder	Malvern Preparatory School (PA)
65	Reed Trimble	Baltimore Orioles	Outfielder	Southern Miss
66	Peyton Wilson	Kansas City Royals	Second baseman	Alabama
67	Adrian Del Castillo	Arizona Diamondbacks	Catcher	Miami (FL)
68	Joe Rock	Colorado Rockies	Pitcher	Ohio
69	Tommy Mace	Cleveland Indians	Pitcher	Florida
70	Ryan Holgate	St. Louis Cardinals	Outfielder	Arizona
71	Robert Gasser	San Diego Padres	Pitcher	Houston

=== Other notable selections ===
Round	Pick	Player	Team	Position	School
3	72	Bubba Chandler	Pittsburgh Pirates	Pitcher	North Oconee High School (GA)
3	73	Cameron Cauley	Texas Rangers	Shortstop	Barbers Hill High School (TX)
3	74	Dylan Smith	Detroit Tigers	Pitcher	Alabama
3	76	John Rhodes	Baltimore Orioles	Outfielder	Kentucky
3	77	Jacob Steinmetz	Arizona Diamondbacks	Pitcher	ELEV8 Baseball Academy (FL)
3	78	Carter Jensen	Kansas City Royals	Catcher	Park Hill High School (MO)
3	80	Landon Marceaux	Los Angeles Angels	Pitcher	LSU
3	84	Jordan Viars	Philadelphia Phillies	Outfielder	Reedy High School (TX)
3	85	Mason Black	San Francisco Giants	Pitcher	Lehigh
3	86	Alex Binelas	Milwaukee Brewers	Third baseman	Louisville
3	91	Ricky Tiedemann	Toronto Blue Jays	Pitcher	Golden West College
3	92	Brock Selvidge	New York Yankees	Pitcher	Hamilton High School (AZ)
3	94	Sean Burke	Chicago White Sox	Pitcher	Maryland
3	95	Jake Fox	Cleveland Indians	Second baseman / Outfielder	Lakeland Christian School (FL)
3	96	Dylan Dodd	Atlanta Braves	Pitcher	Southeast Missouri State
3	97	Mason Miller	Oakland Athletics	Pitcher	Gardner-Webb
3	98	Cade Povich	Minnesota Twins	Pitcher	Nebraska
3	99	Kevin Kopps	San Diego Padres	Pitcher	Arkansas
4	104	Tyler Mattison	Detroit Tigers	Pitcher	Bryant
4	107	Chad Patrick	Arizona Diamondbacks	Pitcher	Purdue University Northwest
4	108	Shane Panzini	Kansas City Royals	Pitcher	Red Bank Catholic High School (NJ)
4	109	Hunter Goodman	Colorado Rockies	Catcher	Memphis
4	110	Luke Murphy	Los Angeles Angels	Pitcher	Vanderbilt
4	113	Bryce Miller	Seattle Mariners	Pitcher	Texas A&M
4	116	Logan Henderson	Milwaukee Brewers	Pitcher	McLennan Community College
4	118	Tanner Allen	Miami Marlins	Outfielder	Mississippi State
4	121	Chad Dallas	Toronto Blue Jays	Pitcher	Tennessee
4	122	Cooper Bowman	New York Yankees	Second baseman	Louisville
4	123	Christian Franklin	Chicago Cubs	Outfielder	Arkansas
4	126	Cal Conley	Atlanta Braves	Shortstop	Texas Tech
4	127	Denzel Clarke	Oakland Athletics	Outfielder	Cal State Northridge
4	128	Christian Encarnacion-Strand	Minnesota Twins	Third baseman	Oklahoma State
4	129	Jackson Wolf	San Diego Padres	Pitcher	West Virginia
4	131	Nick Nastrini	Los Angeles Dodgers	Pitcher	UCLA
4	132	Chayce McDermott	Houston Astros (Note: Compensation pick for the Toronto Blue Jays signing George Springer)	Pitcher	Ball State
5	136	Nathan Hickey	Boston Red Sox	Catcher	Florida
5	140	Evan Justice	Colorado Rockies	Pitcher	NC State
5	141	Brett Kerry	Los Angeles Angels	Pitcher	South Carolina
5	142	Christian Scott	New York Mets	Pitcher	Florida
5	145	Griff McGarry	Philadelphia Phillies	Pitcher	Virginia
5	148	Quincy Hamilton	Houston Astros	Outfielder	Wright State
5	151	Gordon Graceffo	St. Louis Cardinals	Pitcher	Villanova
5	154	Liam Spence	Chicago Cubs	Shortstop	Tennessee
5	156	Tanner Bibee	Cleveland Indians	Pitcher	Cal State Fullerton
5	157	Luke Waddell	Atlanta Braves	Shortstop	Georgia Tech
5	159	Christian MacLeod	Minnesota Twins	Pitcher	Mississippi State
5	160	Max Ferguson	San Diego Padres	Second baseman	Tennessee
5	162	Ben Casparius	Los Angeles Dodgers	Pitcher	UConn
6	164	Chase Lee	Texas Rangers	Pitcher	Alabama
6	170	Braxton Fulford	Colorado Rockies	Catcher	Texas Tech
6	174	Bryan Woo	Seattle Mariners	Pitcher	Cal Poly
6	178	Spencer Arrighetti	Houston Astros	Pitcher	Louisiana
6	182	Hayden Juenger	Toronto Blue Jays	Pitcher	Missouri State
6	183	Richard Fitts	New York Yankees	Pitcher	Auburn
6	187	Justyn-Henry Malloy	Atlanta Braves	First baseman	Georgia Tech
6	189	Travis Adams	Minnesota Twins	Pitcher	Sacramento State
6	190	Ryan Bergert	San Diego Padres	Pitcher	West Virginia
6	191	Mason Montgomery	Tampa Bay Rays	Pitcher	Texas Tech
6	192	Emmet Sheehan	Los Angeles Dodgers	Pitcher	Boston College
7	195	Brant Hurter	Detroit Tigers	Pitcher	Georgia Tech
7	196	Wyatt Olds	Boston Red Sox	Pitcher	Oklahoma
7	199	Noah Cameron	Kansas City Royals	Pitcher	Central Arkansas
7	203	Jacob Young	Washington Nationals	Outfielder	University of Florida
7	207	Tristan Peters	Milwaukee Brewers	Outfielder	Southern Illinois
7	208	Joey Loperfido	Houston Astros	Outfielder	Duke
7	213	Robby Ahlstrom	New York Yankees	Pitcher	Oregon
7	216	Jack Leftwich	Cleveland Indians	Pitcher	Florida
7	217	AJ Smith-Shawver	Atlanta Braves	Pitcher	Colleyville Heritage High School (TX)
7	218	Brett Harris	Oakland Athletics	Third baseman	Gonzaga
7	219	Jake Rucker	Minnesota Twins	Third baseman	Tennessee
8	226	Hunter Dobbins	Boston Red Sox	Pitcher	Texas Tech
8	227	Creed Willems	Baltimore Orioles	Catcher	Aledo High School (TX)
8	230	Robby Martin	Colorado Rockies	Outfielder	Florida State
8	232	Mike Vasil	New York Mets	Pitcher	Virginia
8	238	Colton Gordon	Houston Astros	Pitcher	UCF
8	239	Patrick Monteverde	Miami Marlins	Pitcher	Texas Tech
8	243	Will Warren	New York Yankees	Pitcher	Southeastern Louisiana
8	245	Fraser Ellard	Chicago White Sox	Pitcher	Liberty
9	254	Liam Hicks	Texas Rangers	Catcher	Arkansas State
9	255	Garrett Burhenn	Detroit Tigers	Pitcher	Ohio State
9	261	Braden Olthoff	Los Angeles Angels	Pitcher	Tulane
9	273	Chandler Champlain	New York Yankees	Pitcher	USC
9	276	Will Dion	Cleveland Indians	Pitcher	McNeese State
10	287	Billy Cook	Baltimore Orioles	First baseman / Outfielder	Pepperdine
10	293	Darren Baker	Washington Nationals	Second baseman	California
10	295	Logan Cerny	Philadelphia Phillies	Outfielder	Troy
10	303	Ben Cowles	New York Yankees	Shortstop	Maryland
10	306	Franco Alemán	Cleveland Indians	Pitcher	Florida
10	308	Jack Winkler	Oakland Athletics	Infielder	San Francisco
11	316	Niko Kavadas	Boston Red Sox	First baseman	Notre Dame
11	321	Chase Silseth (Note: First player selected in the 2021 draft to reach the Major Leagues)	Los Angeles Angels	Pitcher	Arizona
11	327	Roc Riggio*	Milwaukee Brewers	Second baseman	Thousand Oaks (CA)
11	339	Brandon Birdsell*	Minnesota Twins	Pitcher	Texas Tech
11	340	River Ryan	San Diego Padres	Pitcher	UNC Pembroke
11	342	Justin Wrobleski	Los Angeles Dodgers	Pitcher	Oklahoma State
12	347	Justin Armbruester	Baltimore Orioles	Pitcher	New Mexico
12	355	T. J. Rumfield	Philadelphia Phillies	First baseman	Virginia Tech
12	356	Landen Roupp	San Francisco Giants	Pitcher	UNC Wilmington
12	358	Rhett Kouba	Houston Astros	Pitcher	Dallas Baptist
12	359	Brandon White	Miami Marlins	Pitcher	Washington State
12	360	Julian Aguiar	Cincinnati Reds	Pitcher	Cypress College
12	363	Ben Rice	New York Yankees	Catcher	Dartmouth
12	367	Andrew Hoffmann	Atlanta Braves	Pitcher	Illinois
12	372	Ronan Kopp	Los Angeles Dodgers	Pitcher	South Mountain Community College
13	392	Matt Svanson	Toronto Blue Jays	Pitcher	Lehigh
13	393	Zach Messinger	New York Yankees	Pitcher	Virginia
13	399	David Festa	Minnesota Twins	Pitcher	Seton Hall
13	401	Bob Seymour	Tampa Bay Rays	First baseman	Wake Forest
14	411	Eric Torres	Los Angeles Angels	Pitcher	Kansas State
14	412	Nathan Lavender	New York Mets	Pitcher	Illinois
14	417	Jace Avina	Milwaukee Brewers	Outfielder	Spanish Springs High School (NV)
14	421	Andre Granillo	St. Louis Cardinals	Pitcher	UC Riverside
14	427	Caleb Durbin	Atlanta Braves	Shortstop	Washington University
14	429	Pierson Ohl	Minnesota Twins	Pitcher	Grand Canyon
14	432	Jordan Leasure	Los Angeles Dodgers	Pitcher	Tampa
15	437	Keagan Gillies	Baltimore Orioles	Pitcher	Tulane
15	453	Danny Watson	New York Yankees	Pitcher	VCU
16	473	Jack Sinclair	Washington Nationals	Pitcher	UCF
16	490	Alek Jacob	San Diego Padres	Pitcher	Gonzaga
16	492	Mike Sirota*	Los Angeles Dodgers	Shortstop	The Frederick Gunn School (CT)
17	496	Luis Guerrero	Boston Red Sox	Pitcher	Chipola College
17	499	Luca Tresh	Kansas City Royals	Catcher	NC State
17	501	Mason Erla	Los Angeles Angels	Pitcher	Michigan State
18	525	Ben Malgeri	Detroit Tigers	Outfielder	Northeastern
18	538	Will Wagner	Houston Astros	Second baseman	Liberty
18	549	Mike Paredes	Minnesota Twins	Pitcher	San Diego State
18	550	Gage Jump*	San Diego Padres	Pitcher	JSerra Catholic High School (CA)
18	551	Kenny Piper	Tampa Bay Rays	Catcher	Columbia College (MO)
19	555	Justice Bigbie	Detroit Tigers	First baseman	Western Carolina
19	557	Alex Pham	Baltimore Orioles	Pitcher	San Francisco
19	565	Seth Halvorsen*	Philadelphia Phillies	Pitcher	Missouri
19	573	Dominic Keegan*	New York Yankees	Utility	Vanderbilt
20	596	Vance Honeycutt*	San Francisco Giants	Shortstop	Salisbury High School (NC)
20	597	Samuel Mendez (Note: Oldest player selected in the history of the draft)	Milwaukee Brewers	Pitcher	Cisco College
20	602	Luke Holman*	Toronto Blue Jays	Pitcher	Wilson High School (PA)
20	610	Chase Burns*	San Diego Padres	Pitcher	Beech Senior High School (TN)

The draft included two players identified as Orthodox Jews: third-round pitcher Jacob Steinmetz and 20th-round catcher Elie Kligman, selected by the Washington Nationals. Kligman said that he would not play on Shabbat, while Steinmetz planned to walk to games rather than use transportation on the Sabbath.

== Notes ==
Compensation picks
