= Philadelphia Phillies minor league players =

Below are the rosters of the minor league affiliates of the Philadelphia Phillies:

== Players ==
=== Keaton Anthony ===
Keaton Anthony

Philadelphia Phillies
- First baseman
- Born: June 24, 2001 (age 25); Fort Wayne, Indiana, U.S.
- Bats: Right Throws: Right

Keaton Michael Anthony (born June 24, 2001) is an American professional baseball first baseman in the Philadelphia Phillies organization.

Anthony attended Mill Creek High School in Hoschton, Georgia. After graduating, he played college baseball at the University of Iowa, where he mostly played right field, designated hitter, and pitcher. Anthony missed most of the 2021 season with a hamstring injury, but was a regular with the Hawkeyes in 2022, earning Big Ten Freshman of the Year honors. He was once again productive in 2023, but his career was put in jeopardy when he was implicated in a gambling probe regarding student athletes at Iowa and Iowa State University. Anthony was later amongst the defendants to file a counter-suit over unlawful search processes. He ended up missing the final 17 games of Iowa's season, his college career effectively over. In 2023, he played collegiate summer baseball with the Cotuit Kettleers of the Cape Cod Baseball League.

Considered a likely mid-round selection going into the 2023 MLB draft, Anthony instead went unselected, something he believed was directly linked to the gambling probe. He eventually was able to land a professional contract, signing as an undrafted free agent on July 11, 2023 with the Philadelphia Phillies, who immediately moved him to first base. He split the remainder of the year between the Rookie-level Florida Complex League Phillies and the Single-A Clearwater Threshers, hitting .302 over 23 contests. Anthony returned to Clearwater to start the 2024 season, and was promoted to the High-A Jersey Shore BlueClaws on July 25, before earning another promotion on September 6, this time to the Double-A Reading Fightin Phils. Following the season, he won the Rawlings Gold Glove Award was the best defensive firstbaseman in Minor League Baseball for the year. Back at Double-A to start the 2025 season, Anthony continued to hit. As part of his hot start, he slashed .385/.442/.603 during the month of May, earning system Player of the Month honors. Anthony was promoted to the Triple-A Lehigh Valley IronPigs in June 2025.

- Iowa Hawkeyes bio
- Career statistics from MLB · Baseball Reference (Minors)

=== Caden Bogenpohl ===
Caden Bogenpohl

Philadelphia Phillies
- Outfielder
- Born: April 6, 2005 (age 21); Cape Girardeau, Missouri, U.S.
- Bats: Left Throws: Right

Caden Reece Bogenpohl (born April 6, 2005) is an American professional baseball outfielder in the Philadelphia Phillies organization.

Bogenpohl attended Jackson High School in Jackson, Missouri and played college baseball at Missouri State University. He was selected by the Philadelphia Phillies in the second round of the 2026 Major League Baseball draft.

Bogenpohl made his professional debut with the Clearwater Threshers.

- Career statistics from Baseball Reference (Minors)

=== Cody Bowker ===
Cody Bowker

Philadelphia Phillies
- Pitcher
- Born: December 18, 2003 (age 22); Milford, Massachusetts, U.S.
- Bats: Right Throws: Right

Cody William Bowker (born December 18, 2003) is an American professional baseball pitcher in the Philadelphia Phillies organization.

Bowker attended Thornton Academy in Saco, Maine and played college baseball at Georgetown University for two years at Vanderbilt University for one. He was selected by the Philadelphia Phillies in the third round of the 2025 Major League Baseball draft.

Bogenpohl made his professional debut in 2026 with the Clearwater Threshers and was promoted to the Jersey Shore BlueClaws and Reading Fightin Phils.

- Career statistics from Baseball Reference (Minors)

=== Griffin Burkholder ===
Griffin Burkholder

Philadelphia Phillies
- Outfielder
- Born: August 30, 2005 (age 21); Leesburg, Virginia, U.S.
- Bats: Right Throws: Right

Griffin Andrew Burkholder (born August 30, 2005) is an American professional baseball outfielder in the Philadelphia Phillies organization.

Burkholder grew up in South Riding, Virginia and attended Freedom High School. He batted .487 with two home runs and 16 RBIs as a senior. Burkholder had committed to play college baseball at West Virginia prior to signing with the Phillies.

Burkholder was selected in the second round of the 2024 Major League Baseball draft by the Philadelphia Phillies. He signed with the Phillies on July 23, 2024, and received an above-slot signing bonus of $2.5 million. Burkholder was assigned to the Clearwater Threshers of the Single-A Florida State League to begin his professional career.

- Career statistics from MLB · Baseball Reference (Minors)

=== Carson DeMartini ===
Carson DeMartini

Philadelphia Phillies
- Infielder
- Born: December 27, 2002 (age 23); Virginia Beach, Virginia, U.S.
- Bats: Left Throws: Right

Carson Davis DeMartini (born December 27, 2002) is an American professional baseball infielder in the Philadelphia Phillies organization.

DeMartini attended Ocean Lakes High School in Virginia Beach, Virginia and played college baseball at Virginia Tech. In 2022, he played collegiate summer baseball with the Brewster Whitecaps of the Cape Cod Baseball League and was named a league all-star. He was selected by the Philadelphia Phillies in the fourth round (130th overall) of the 2024 Major League Baseball draft.

DeMartini made his professional debut that year with the Single–A Clearwater Threshers. He started 2025 with the High–A Jersey Shore BlueClaws before being promoted to the Double–A Reading Fighting Phils.

- Career statistics from Baseball Reference (Minors)

=== Aroon Escobar ===
Aroon Escobar

Philadelphia Phillies
- Second baseman
- Born: January 1, 2005 (age 21); Caracas, Venezuela
- Bats: Right Throws: Right

Agnnel Aroon Escobar (born January 1, 2005) is a Venezuelan professional baseball second baseman in the Philadelphia Phillies organization.

Escobar signed with the Philadelphia Phillies as an international free agent in January 2022. He made his professional debut that year with the Dominican Summer League Phillies and also played 2023 with them.

Escobar played 2024 with the Florida Complex League Phillies and started 2025 with the Clearwater Threshers.

- Career statistics from Baseball Reference (Minors)

=== Mavis Graves ===
Mavis Graves

Philadelphia Phillies
- Pitcher
- Born: November 20, 2003 (age 23); Greenville, South Carolina, U.S.
- Bats: Left Throws: Left

William Mavis Graves (born November 20, 2003) is an American professional baseball pitcher in the Philadelphia Phillies organization.

Graves attended Eastside High School in Taylors, South Carolina, where he played baseball. As a senior in 2022, he hit .346 with eight home runs alongside pitching to a 2.01 ERA and 81 strikeouts. He committed to play college baseball for the Clemson Tigers. Graves was selected by the Philadelphia Phillies in the sixth round of the 2022 Major League Baseball draft. He signed with the team for $282,000.

Graves made his professional debut in 2023 with the Rookie-level Florida Complex League Phillies with whom he started 11 games and went 0–4 with a 7.68 ERA over 34 innings. He played the 2024 season with the Single-A Clearwater Threshers, appearing in 18 games (16 starts) and going 7–6 with a 3.64 ERA and 117 strikeouts over 84 innings. In May, the Phillies named him their Minor League Pitcher of the Month. During 2025 spring training, Graves was named to the Phillies Spring Breakout roster. He was assigned to the High-A Jersey Shore BlueClaws for the 2025 season. He started 21 games for Jersey Shore and went 6–7 with a 4.41 ERA and 103 strikeouts over 81 2/3 innings. Graves returned to Jersey Shore to begin the 2026 season and was promoted to the Double-A Reading Fightin Phils in July. Following his promotion to Reading, he moved into a relief role. Across 30 games (16 starts) between Jersey Shore and Reading, Graves had a 3–7 record, a 3.86 ERA, and 117 strikeouts over 77 innings.

- Career statistics from Baseball Reference (Minors)

=== Chuck King ===
Chuck King

Philadelphia Phillies
- Pitcher
- Born: January 6, 1998 (age 28); Coppell, Texas, U.S.
- Bats: Right Throws: Right

Charles Fuggitt "Chuck" King (born January 6, 1998) is an American professional baseball pitcher in the Philadelphia Phillies organization.

King grew up and attended Coppell High School in Coppell, Texas before later enrolling at Texas Christian University. He pitched in parts of five seasons with the Horned Frogs while also pursuing a degree in urban wildlife biology. Ultimately though, King pivoted back to baseball by moving into the sports science sphere, eventually accepting a job with the San Diego Padres. While with the Padres, he again took an interest in pitching, eventually quitting his job to work out with Driveline Baseball in advance of a return to competitive baseball. Shortly after participating in the organization's 2024 Pro Day, he signed a minor league contract with the Philadelphia Phillies.

King debuted with and spent most of the 2024 season with the High-A Jersey Shore BlueClaws before finishing the season with the Double-A Reading Fightin Phils, pitching out of the bullpen. He posted a 3.92 ERA over 41.1 innings of work on the year. In 2025, King returned to Reading, this time as a member of their starting rotation, finishing with a 4.38 ERA over 123.1 innings across 25 appearances. He returned to Reading again for the start of the 2026 season.

=== Wen Hui Pan ===
Wen Hui Pan

Philadelphia Phillies
- Pitcher
- Born: September 19, 2002 (age 24); Hualien City, Taiwan
- Bats: Right Throws: Right
Medals
Men's baseball
Representing Chinese Taipei
WBSC Premier12
Gold medal – first place	2024 Tokyo	Team
Asian Baseball Championship
Silver medal – second place	2023 Taiwan	Team
U-18 Baseball World Cup
Gold medal – first place	2019 Busan	Team

Wen Hui Pan (Chinese: 潘文輝; born September 19, 2002) is a Taiwanese professional baseball pitcher in the Philadelphia Phillies organization.

Pan signed with the Philadelphia Phillies as an international free agent on January 16, 2023. He made his professional debut later that year with the Clearwater Threshers of the Single-A Florida State League, posting a 2.81 ERA over 57.2 innings of work before earning a late-season promotion to the High-A Jersey Shore BlueClaws of the South Atlantic League, where he allowed 10 runs in 6 innings of work. Pan spent most of 2024 with Jersey Shore while working around injury issues, throwing 21 of his 29.1 total innings for the season with the team. After the season, he was assigned to the Glendale Desert Dogs of the Arizona Fall League.

Pan has represented the Chinese Taipei national baseball team in international competition. He participated in the 2019 U-18 Baseball World Cup, allowing 3 earned runs in 5.1 innings of work over 3 appearances, as the team would go on to win the championship. Pan was a more productive member of their team for the 2020 U-23 Baseball World Cup, allowing no earned runs over 4 appearances totaling 4 innings of work, but the team would fall in the Super Round. He also represented Taiwan at the 2023 Asian Baseball Championship, though only faced one batter during the tournament. Pan was named to Taiwan's roster for the 2024 WBSC Premier12. He was placed on the full-season injured list on May 29, ending his season without appearing in a game.

- Career statistics from Baseball Reference (Minors)

=== Francisco Renteria ===
Francisco Renteria

Philadelphia Phillies
- Outfielder
- Born: January 9, 2009 (age 17); Maracaibo, Venezuela
- Bats: Right Throws: Right

Francisco Amado Renteria (born January 9, 2009) is a Venezuelan professional baseball outfielder in the Philadelphia Phillies organization.

Renteria was rated as one of the top prospects in the 2026 international class. He signed with the Philadelphia Phillies in January 2026 for $4 million.

Renteria made his professional debut in 2026 with the Dominican Summer League Phillies.

- Career statistics from Baseball Reference (Minors)

=== Bryan Rincon ===
Bryan Rincon

Philadelphia Phillies
- Shortstop
- Born: February 8, 2004 (age 22); New York City, U.S.
- Bats: Switch Throws: Right

Bryan Alfonso Rincon (born February 8, 2004) is an American professional baseball shortstop in the Philadelphia Phillies organization.

Rincon was born in New York City and moved to Venezuela when he was three months old. When he was 16 in 2020, he moved back to the United States and attended Shaler Area High School in Shaler Township, Pennsylvania.

Rincon was selected by the Philadelphia Phillies in the 14th round of the 2022 Major League Baseball draft. He made his professional debut that year with the Florida Complex League Phillies. He played 2023 and 2024 with the Clearwater Threshers and Jersey Shore BlueClaws and 2025 with Jersey Shore. After the 2024 and 2025 seasons, Rincon played in the Arizona Fall League.

Rincon started the 2026 season with the Reading Fighting Phils.

- Career statistics from Baseball Reference (Minors)

=== Devin Saltiban ===
Devin Saltiban

Philadelphia Phillies
- Shortstop
- Born: February 14, 2005 (age 21); Hilo, Hawaii, U.S.
- Bats: Right Throws: Right

Devin Ezekiel-Boyd Saltiban (born February 14, 2005) is an American professional baseball shortstop in the Philadelphia Phillies organization.

Saltiban attended Hilo High School in Hilo, Hawaii, where he played baseball. After graduating in 2023, he played in the MLB Draft League for the West Virginia Black Bears. Saltiban was selected by the Philadelphia Phillies with the 98th overall pick in the third round of the 2023 Major League Baseball draft. He signed for $602,000, forgoing his commitment to play college baseball at the University of Hawaiʻi.

After signing, Saltiban made his professional debut with the Florida Complex League Phillies, batting .333 with one home run over ten games. He was assigned to the Clearwater Threshers for the 2024 season and hit .237 with 17 home runs, 53 RBIs, and 22 stolen bases over 97 games and was named a Florida State League All-Star. Saltiban was assigned to the Jersey Shore BlueClaws to open the 2025 season. Saltiban missed over two months during the season due to an undisclosed injury, rehabbing with the FCL Phillies and Clearwater before returning to the BlueClaws. Over 77 games played for the season, he hit .180 with seven home runs, 26 RBIs, and 19 stolen bases. After the 2025 season, Saltiban played in the Australian Baseball League with the Adelaide Giants and batted .321 with five home runs across 36 games. In 2026, he returned to play for Jersey Shore and batted .247 with seven home runs, 54 RBIs, and 32 stolen bases over 109 games.

- Career statistics from Baseball Reference (Minors)

=== Tyler Spangler ===
Tyler Spangler

Philadelphia Phillies
- Shortstop
- Born: October 1, 2007 (age 19); Walnut Creek, California, U.S.
- Bats: Left Throws: Right

Tyler Spangler (born October 1, 2007) is a professional baseball shortstop in the Philadelphia Phillies organization.

Spangler attended De La Salle High School. Through his first three years, he hit .376 with 16 home runs and 73 RBI in 86 games and was named Metro Player of the Year by the San Francisco Chronicle as a junior (hitting .337 that year). He did not play his senior season after suffering a back injury. He attended the MLB Draft Combine at Chase Field at the end of June 2026.

Spangler was considered a top prospect for the 2026 Major League Baseball draft. He was drafted with the 36th pick in the draft by the Philadelphia Phillies. On July 24, 2026, he signed with the Phillies for an over-slot signing bonus of $3.25 million.

- Career statistics from Baseball Reference (Minors)

== Full Triple-A to Rookie League rosters ==
=== Triple-A ===
Lehigh Valley IronPigs roster
Players		Coaches/Other
Pitchers: 41 Ryan Cusick; 47 Tristan Garnett; -- Connor Gillispie; -- Geoff Hartlieb; 25 Chuck King; -- Max Kranick; 48 Mitch Neunborn; -- Andrew Walling	Catchers: 38 Jordan Dissin; -- Blake Hunt; 24 Paul McIntosh; -- Brian Navarreto; Infielders: 10 Keaton Anthony; 4 Robert Moore; -- Bryan Ramos; Outfielders: 69 Wuilfredo Antunez; 3 Nick Biddison; 21 Jonathan Hogart	Manager: 30 Chris Adamson; Coaches: 62 Phil Cundari (pitching); 17 Adam Lind (hitting); 35 Ray Ricker (coach); 7-day injured list; * On Philadelphia Phillies 40-man roster; ~ Development list; # Rehab assignment; ∞ Reserve list; ‡ Restricted list; § Suspended list; † Temporarily inactive list; Roster updated November 18, 2026; Transactions; → More rosters: MiLB • International League; → Philadelphia Phillies minor league players

=== Double-A ===
Reading Fightin Phils roster
Players		Coaches/Other
Pitchers: -- Gabriel Barbosa; 18 Keegan Batka; 49 Cody Bowker; 27 Aaron Combs; 57 Jack Dallas; 33 Ryan Dromboski; 47 Reese Dutton; -- Braeden Fausnaught; 30 Evan Gates; 19 Mavis Graves; 58 Daniel Harper; 29 Estibenzon Jimenez; 12 Christian McGowan; 53 Wesley Moore; 52 Wen-Hui Pan; 28 Luke Russo; 38 Braydon Tucker; 46 Kevin Warunek; 15 Gage Wood	Catchers: 36 Luis Caicuto; 7 Kehden Hettiger; 48 Caleb Ricketts; 53 Guillermo Rosario; Infielders: 5 Carson DeMartini; 10 Aroon Escobar; 3 Aidan Miller; 22 Raider Tello; Outfielders: 23 Raylin Heredia; 0 Austin Murr; 6 Dante Nori; 16 Bryson Ware	Manager: 13 Al Pedrique; Coaches: 35 Brad Bergesen (pitching); 43 Alex Harter (assistant pitching); 40 Jeff Livesey (hitting); 2 Marty Malloy (bench); 11 Nerluis Martinez (coach); 7-day injured list; * On Philadelphia Phillies 40-man roster; ~ Development list; # Rehab assignment; ∞ Reserve list; ‡ Restricted list; § Suspended list; † Temporarily inactive list; Roster updated November 17, 2026; Transactions; → More rosters: MiLB • Eastern League; → Philadelphia Phillies minor league players

=== High-A ===
Jersey Shore BlueClaws roster
Players		Coaches/Other
Pitchers: 14 Juan Amarante; 25 Brandon Beckel; 34 Tegan Cain; -- Ethan Chenault; 35 Jake Eddington; 36 Tanner Gresham; 21 Sam Highfill; 31 Camron Hill; 5 Titan Kennedy-Hayes; 12 Gerardo Lopez; 40 Cade Obermueller; 41 Micah Ottenbreit; 6 Jose Pena Jr.; 20 Adilson Peralta; 28 Cody Powker; 8 Danyony Pulido; -- Casey Steward; 6 Saul Teran	Catchers: 32 Luke Davis; 10 Alirio Ferrebus; 9 Angel Mata; 32 Scott Mudler; 18 Kodey Shojinaga; Infielders: 10 Brady Day; 47 Romeli Espinosa; 15 Tyler Pettorini; 11 Robert Phelps; 3 Devin Saltiban; 7 Daunte Stuart; 13 Juan Villavicencio; 26 Brock Vradenburg; Outfielders: 17 Griffin Burkholder; 27 Joel Dragoo; 23 Nathan Humphreys; 4 Carter Mathison; 22 TJayy Walton	Manager: 1 Mycal Jones; Coaches: 50 Ryan Buchter (pitching); 16 Orlando Munoz (coach); 33 Darnell Sweeney (hitting); 45 Ryan Wrobleski (assistant hitting); 7-day injured list; * On Philadelphia Phillies 40-man roster; ~ Development list; # Rehab assignment; ∞ Reserve list; ‡ Restricted list; § Suspended list; † Temporarily inactive list; Roster updated November 3, 2026; Transactions; → More rosters: MiLB • South Atlantic League; → Philadelphia Phillies minor league players

=== Single-A ===
Clearwater Threshers roster
Players		Coaches/Other
Pitchers: 39 Luis Avila; 18 Wilmer Blanco; 28 Tyler Bowen; 9 Kyler Carmack; 19 Manuel Colon; 17 Richie Cortese; 54 Cole Gilley; -- Jonathan Gonzalez; 45 Orlando Gonzalez; 25 Yordanis Guerra; 6 Cal Higgins; 2 Elias Holbert; 38 Angel Liranzo; 47 MT Morrissey; 51 Brad Pacheco; 35 Jacob Pruitt; 29 Brendan Sweeney; 26 James Tallon; -- Zack Tukis; 27 Brian Walters; 55 Sean Youngerman; 13 Zuher Yousuf	Catchers: -- Yhoan Escalona; 24 Tyler Minnick; 11 Matt Quintanar; 10 Will Vierling; 23 Macon Winslow; Infielders: 52 Nolan Beltran; 21 Evan Bouldin; 16 Cade Climie; 17 Owen Clyne; 3 Matthew Ferrara; 49 Reece Moroney; Outfielders: 31 Brayden Bakes; 24 Caden Bogenpohl; 40 Victor Cardoza; 44 Will Gasparino; 46 Lane Haworth; 43 Jack Hopko	Manager: 30 Aaron Barrett; Coaches: 48 Alex Concepcion (assistant pitching); 33 Matt Ellmyer (pitching); 41 Chris Heintz (hitting); 8 Desmond Jennings (assistant hitting); 22 Shawn Williams (bench); 7-day injured list; * On Philadelphia Phillies 40-man roster; ~ Development list; # Rehab assignment; ∞ Reserve list; ‡ Restricted list; § Suspended list; † Temporarily inactive list; Roster updated November 3, 2026; Transactions; → More rosters: MiLB • Florida State League; → Philadelphia Phillies minor league players

=== Rookie ===
Florida Complex League Phillies roster
Players		Coaches/Other
Pitchers: 65 Eligio Arias; -- Patrick Clemmy; -- Cooper Consiglio; -- Christian Coppola; 91 Patrick Crotty; -- Wyatt Danilowicz; 4 Alexander De Los Santos; 24 Matthew Fisher; 46 Deiry Gonzalez; 94 Yordanis Guerra; 75 David Hernandez; -- Cal Higgins; -- Jaxon Jelkin; -- Justin Lee; 60 Ramon Marquez; 43 Naoel Mejia; -- Kobe Minchey; 54 Jesus Montiel; 82 Aneury Montilla; 96 Anderson Navas; 77 Matthew Potok; -- Bo Rhudy; -- Ruger Riojas; -- Deven Sheerin; -- Brendan Sweeney; -- Drew Titsworth; -- Adam Troy; -- Naiker Velazquez; -- Josh Winder	Catchers: 70 Anderson Araujo; 92 Rey Cruz; -- Gabriel Flores; -- Tyler Minnick; 5 Cesar Mujica; Infielders: 62 Jonathan Alcantara; -- Evan Bouldin; 3 Logan Dawson; -- Ilan Fernandez; -- Tyler Spangler; Outfielders: 44 Jalvin Arias; 31 Jack Barker; 19 Jaeden Calderon; 79 Victor Cardoza; 97 Maylerson Casanova; -- Nathanael Cijntje; 58 Manolfi Jimenez; 49 Esterling Rodriguez	Manager: 40 Wilson Ramos; Coaches: 45 Gustavo Armas (pitching); 27 Joel Chimelis (hitting); 8 Roly de Armas (bench); 50 Rafael Delima (hitting); 11 Rubén Tejada (coach); 7-day injured list; * On Philadelphia Phillies 40-man roster; ~ Development list; # Rehab assignment; ∞ Reserve list; ‡ Restricted list; § Suspended list; † Temporarily inactive list; Roster updated November 3, 2026; Transactions; → More rosters: MiLB • Florida Complex League; → Philadelphia Phillies minor league players

=== Foreign Rookie ===
Dominican Summer League Phillies roster
Players		Coaches/Other
Pitchers: 10 Justin Burgos; 18 Ronaldson Estevez; -- Hua Ho; 24 Wandelin Garcia; 22 Leonardo Larez; 49 Emmanuel Leon; 67 Albertt Medina; 62 Francisco Mercedes; 59 Wilfry Michel; 21 Luis Mirabal; 58 Jorge Miranda; 54 Jorge Mitre; 57 Alexandre Moreti; 45 Samuel Ortiz; -- Chan-Min Park ‡; 27 D'wichi Ramirez; 83 Cristian Rego; 92 Jose Romero; 51 Filippo Sabatini; 93 Yilmar Samudio; 60 Jhoener Tovar; 68 David Victorino; 56 Rene Yrish; 25 Yoel Zambrano	Catchers: 52 Nelson Prieto; 33 Sebastian Saenz; 28 Jose Tovar; 13 Deivis Velasquez; Infielders: 19 Nieves Izaguirre; 23 Javen Maduro; 63 Juan Medina; 16 Juan Parra; 64 Carlos Severino; 55 Patrick Silva; Outfielders: 43 Elian Adames; 61 Jose Briceno; 17 Dayber Cruceta; 70 Edwin Ramirez; 50 Francisco Renteria	Manager: 30 Felix Castillo; Coaches: 53 César Cabral (pitching); 26 Carlos Hernandez (pitching); 2 Manny Martínez (bench); 41 Guillermo Matos (hitting); 29 Melky Mesa (hitting); 3 Waner Santana (infield); 7-day injured list; * On Philadelphia Phillies 40-man roster; ~ Development list; # Rehab assignment; ∞ Reserve list; ‡ Restricted list; § Suspended list; † Temporarily inactive list; Roster updated November 3, 2026; Transactions; → More rosters: MiLB • Dominican Summer League; → Philadelphia Phillies minor league players

== See also ==
- Paul Owens Award
