= New York Mets minor league players =

Below are some of the minor-league baseball players in the New York Mets organization.

== Players ==
=== Bruin Agbayani ===
Bruin Agbayani

New York Mets
- Outfielder
- Born: July 20, 2003 (age 23); Raleigh, North Carolina, U.S.
- Bats: Left Throws: Left

Bruin Kazuya Paliku Agbayani (born March 26, 2007) is an American professional baseball infielder for the New York Mets organization.

Agbayani attended Saint Louis School in Honolulu, Hawaii, and committed to attend the University of Michigan to play college baseball for the University of Michigan. In 2025, he was named the Gatorade High School Baseball Player of the Year for Hawaii. He played for the Frederick Keys in the MLB Draft League.

The Minnesota Twins selected Agbayani in the sixth round, with the 179th pick, in the 2025 MLB draft. He signed with the Twins, rather than attend Michigan.

On July 31, 2026, the Twins traded Agbayani and Billy Amick to the New York Mets for A. J. Minter.

Agbayani's father, Benny, played in MLB.

=== Justin Armbruester ===
Justin Armbruester

New York Mets
- Pitcher
- Born: October 21, 1998 (age 27); Bellevue, Washington, U.S.
- Bats: Right Throws: Right

Justin David Armbruester (born October 21, 1998) is an American professional baseball pitcher in the New York Mets organization.

Armbruester attended Eastside Catholic School in Sammamish, Washington, and played on their baseball team. He played two years of college baseball at Pacific Lutheran University before playing two seasons at the University of New Mexico. During his senior year in 2021, he started 13 games and went 5–2 with a 3.58 ERA and 101 strikeouts over 77 innings, and was named the Mountain West Conference Pitcher of the Year. He was selected by the Baltimore Orioles in the 12th round of the 2021 Major League Baseball draft.

Armbruester signed with the Orioles and made his professional debut with the Florida Complex League Orioles before he was promoted to the Delmarva Shorebirds. Over 9 1/3 innings, he posted a 1.93 ERA with 16 strikeouts. He opened the 2022 season with the Aberdeen IronBirds and was promoted to the Bowie Baysox in mid-June. Over 26 games (22 starts) between the two teams, he went 6–2 with a 3.85 ERA and 126 strikeouts over 117 innings. Armbruester returned to Bowie to open the 2023 season and was promoted to the Norfolk Tides in mid-June. Over 26 games (25 starts) with the two teams, he went 6–6 with a 3.56 ERA and 109 strikeouts over 121 1/3 innings. He returned to Norfolk in 2024 and made 26 starts for the team, going 5–11 with a 7.54 ERA and 131 strikeouts over 119 1/3 innings. Armbruester appeared in three games for Norfolk in 2025 before being placed on the injured list.

On December 10, 2025, the New York Mets selected Armbruester in the minor league phase of the Rule 5 Draft. For the 2026 season, he played with the St. Lucie Mets, Brooklyn Cyclones, and Binghamton Rumble Ponies and had a 2–0 record, a 1.08 ERA, and 31 strikeouts across 25 innings.

- Career statistics from MLB · Baseball Reference (Minors)
- Pacific Lutheran Lutes bio
- New Mexico Lobos bio

=== Ryan Clifford ===
Ryan Clifford

New York Mets
- Outfielder
- Born: July 20, 2003 (age 23); Raleigh, North Carolina, U.S.
- Bats: Left Throws: Left
Medals
Men's baseball
Representing United States
U-12 Baseball World Cup
Gold medal – first place	2015 Tainan	Team

Ryan Andrew Clifford (born July 20, 2003) is an American professional baseball outfielder in the New York Mets organization.

Clifford attended Leesville Road High School in Raleigh, North Carolina, before transferring to Crossroads Flex High School in Cary, North Carolina. He was drafted by the Houston Astros in the 11th round of the 2022 Major League Baseball draft. He signed with the Astros rather than play college baseball at Vanderbilt University.

Clifford spent his first professional season with the Florida Complex League Astros and Fayetteville Woodpeckers. He started 2023 with Fayetteville.

On August 1, 2023, Clifford was traded alongside Drew Gilbert, to the New York Mets in exchange for Justin Verlander.

After the trade to the New York Mets Clifford was assigned to the Brooklyn Cyclones and finished out the rest of the season there. Clifford returned to the Cyclones to start the 2024 season he was promoted to the Binghamton Rumble Ponies in mid-May of that season

- Career statistics from Baseball Reference (Minors)

=== Corey Collins ===
Corey Collins

New York Mets
- First baseman
- Born: October 10, 2001 (age 25); Coatesville, Pennsylvania, U.S.
- Bats: Left Throws: Right

Corey Joseph Collins (born October 10, 2001) is an American professional baseball catcher and outfielder in the New York Mets organization.

Collins attended North Gwinnett High School in Suwanee, Georgia. As a junior, Collins hit .483 with 16 home runs, before committing to play college baseball at the University of Georgia. In 2022, he played collegiate summer baseball with the Falmouth Commodores of the Cape Cod Baseball League.

As a senior, Collins hit .354 with 20 home runs, in addition to leading the NCAA in on-base percentage. He was named a second-team All-American at the end of the season.

Collins was selected in the sixth round, with the 173rd overall pick, by the New York Mets in the 2024 Major League Baseball draft.

- Career statistics from MLB · Baseball Reference (Minors)
- Georgia Bulldogs bio

=== R.J. Gordon ===
R.J. Gordon

New York Mets
- Pitcher
- Born: October 26, 2001 (age 24); Thousand Oaks, California, U.S.
- Bats: Right Throws: Right

Robert Joseph Gordon (born October 26, 2001) is an American professional baseball pitcher in the New York Mets organization.

Gordon attended West Ranch High School and played college baseball at the University of Oregon for the Ducks. In 2024, as a redshirt junior, Gordon started 17 games for the Ducks and pitched to a 7-6 record, a 5.13 ERA, and 87 strikeouts over 94 2/3 innings. He was selected by the New York Mets in the 13th round of the 2024 Major League Baseball draft and signed with the team.

Gordon made his professional debut in 2025 with the Brooklyn Cyclones and was promoted to the Binghamton Rumble Ponies in July. With Binghamton, he was named Eastern League Pitcher of the Month for August. Over 26 games (21 starts) between both teams, Gordon went 11-3 with a 3.36 ERA and 147 strikeouts across 128 2/3 innings. Gordon opened the 2026 season on the injured list with Binghamton with a lat injury. He completed a rehab assignment with the St. Lucie Mets and then returned to Binghamton. Across 21 starts for Binghamton, he had a 5–9 record, a 5.03 ERA, and 81 strikeouts over 91 1/3 innings.

- Career statistics from Baseball Reference (Minors)
- Oregon Ducks bio

=== Gary Gill Hill ===
Gary Gill Hill

New York Mets
- Pitcher
- Born: September 20, 2004 (age 22); New Rochelle, New York, U.S.
- Bats: Right Throws: Right

Gary Anthony Gill Hill (born September 20, 2004) is an American professional baseball pitcher in the New York Mets organization.

Hill attended John F. Kennedy Catholic Preparatory School in Somers, New York. He was selected by the Tampa Bay Rays in the sixth round of the 2022 Major League Baseball draft.

Hill signed with the Rays and spent his first professional season in 2023 with the Florida Complex League Rays and Charleston RiverDogs. He started 2024 with Charleston.

On August 2, 2026, the Rays traded Hill, Aidan Smith, and Émilien Pitre to the New York Mets in exchange for Freddy Peralta.

- Career statistics from Baseball Reference (Minors)

=== Daviel Hurtado ===
Daviel Hurtado

New York Mets
- Pitcher
- Born: January 26, 2005 (age 21); Havana, Cuba
- Bats: Left Throws: Left

Daviel Hurtado (born January 26, 2005) is a Cuban professional baseball pitcher in the New York Mets organization. He was named to the Cuba national baseball team for the 2026 World Baseball Classic.

Hurtado left Cuba, along with his parents, for the Dominican Republic in 2022. On January 15, 2023, Hurtado signed for $640,000 as an international free agent with the New York Mets.

Hurtado went through Tommy John surgery in 2023 and did not pitch for the Mets. He pitched for the Florida Complex League Mets in the 2024 season and struggled; pitching to a 6.32 ERA in 15.2 innings. In 2025, Hurtado again began the season at FCL but had a 0.47 ERA. He was later promoted to the Single-A St. Lucie Mets. In 13 games in 2025 for St. Lucie, Hurtado had a 2.70 ERA.

- Career statistics from Baseball Reference (Minors)

=== Ryan Lambert ===
Ryan Lambert

New York Mets
- Pitcher
- Born: September 2, 2002 (age 24); Chanhassen, Minnesota, U.S.
- Bats: Right Throws: Right

Ryan Patrick Lambert (born September 2, 2002) is an American professional baseball pitcher in the New York Mets organization.

Lambert attended Minnetonka High School in Minnetonka, Minnesota, and played college baseball at North Iowa Area Community College, Missouri State University and the University of Oklahoma. In the summers of 2022 and 2023, he played for the Minnesota Mud Puppies of the Northwoods League.

Lambert was selected by the New York Mets in the eighth round of the 2024 Major League Baseball draft. He made his professional debut with Brooklyn Cyclones and started 2025 with Brooklyn before being promoted to the Binghamton Rumble Ponies.

- Career statistics from Baseball Reference (Minors)

=== Cole Mathis ===
Cole Mathis

New York Mets
- First baseman
- Born: July 25, 2003 (age 23); Columbus, Georgia, U.S.
- Bats: Right Throws: Right

Greyson Cole Mathis (born July 25, 2003) is an American professional baseball first baseman in the New York Mets organization. He played college baseball for the Charleston Cougars.

Mathis grew up in Cataula, Georgia and attended Harris County High School. He played college baseball for the College of Charleston Cougars as a two-way player. As a sophomore, he slashed .330/.439/.575 with nine home runs while also posting a 5-1 record with a team-best 3.45 ERA over 14 pitching appearances. In 2023, he played collegiate summer baseball with the Cotuit Kettleers of the Cape Cod Baseball League, and was named a league all-star. Mathis was named first team All-CAA after batting .335 with 17 doubles, 14 home runs, 57 RBIs, and 63 runs scored during his junior season in 2024.

Mathis was drafted by the Chicago Cubs in the second round of 2024 Major League Baseball draft. He signed with the Cubs on July 22 and received a $1,681,200 signing bonus. He underwent Tommy John surgery shortly after signing. He made his professional debut in 2025 with the Myrtle Beach Pelicans with whom he batted .215 with three home runs and 14 RBIs over 29 games. After the season, he played in the Arizona Fall League with the Mesa Solar Sox. He returned to Myrtle Beach to begin the 2026 season and was promoted to the South Bend Cubs in May.

On June 25, 2026, Mathis was traded to the New York Mets in exchange for David Peterson.

- Career statistics from Baseball Reference (Minors)
- Charleston Cougars bio

=== Elian Peña ===
Elian Peña

New York Mets
- Shortstop
- Born: October 17, 2007 (age 18); Azua, Dominican Republic, U.S.
- Bats: Left Throws: Right

Elian Peña (born October 19, 2007) is a Dominican professional baseball shortstop in the New York Mets organization.

Peña signed with the New York Mets as an international free agent in January 2025. He made his professional debut that season with the Dominican Summer League Mets.

Peña started 2026 with the St. Lucie Mets.

- Career statistics from Baseball Reference (Minors)

=== Émilien Pitre ===
Émilien Pitre

New York Mets
- Second baseman
- Born: October 4, 2002 (age 24); Repentigny, Quebec, Canada
- Bats: Left Throws: Right

Émilien Joyal Pitre (born October 4, 2002) is a Canadian professional baseball second baseman in the New York Mets organization.

Pitre attended Félix-Leclerc Secondary School in Pointe-Claire, Quebec and played three seasons of college baseball at the University of Kentucky for the Kentucky Wildcats. He appeared in 11 games as a freshman for Kentucky in 2022 and went hitless across four at-bats before playing in 61 games as a sophomore in 2023 and batting .318 with one home run and 51 RBI. In 2023, he played collegiate summer baseball with the Cotuit Kettleers of the Cape Cod Baseball League. As a junior in 2024, he played in 62 games for the Wildcats and hit .301 with ten home runs, 58 RBI, and 26 steals.

Pitre was selected by the Tampa Bay Rays in the second round with the 58th overall pick of the 2024 Major League Baseball draft. He made his professional debut after signing with the Single-A Charleston RiverDogs and batted .299 across 21 games. In 2025, he played the entirety of the season with the High-A Bowling Green Hot Rods and hit .268 with nine home runs and 63 RBI across 118 games, and the Rays named him Bowling Green's Most Valuable Player after the season's end. Pitre returned to Bowling Green to start the 2026 season and was promoted to the Double-A Montgomery Biscuits in June.

On August 2, 2026, the Rays traded Pitre, Gary Gill Hill, and Aidan Smith to the New York Mets in exchange for Freddy Peralta. The Mets assigned him to the Double-A Binghamton Rumble Ponies. He was then promoted to the Triple-A Syracuse Mets on August 18. Pitre played a total of 118 games for the 2026 season between Bowling Green, Montgomery, Binghamton, and Syracuse, and batted .306 with six home runs, 58 RBI, and 35 stolen bases.

- Career statistics from Baseball Reference (Minors)
- Kentucky Wildcats bio

=== Jacob Reimer ===
Jacob Reimer

New York Mets
- Third baseman
- Born: February 22, 2004 (age 22); Redlands, California, U.S.
- Bats: Right Throws: Right

Jacob Lee Reimer (born February 22, 2004) is an American professional baseball third baseman in the New York Mets organization.

Reimer attended Yucaipa High School in Yucaipa, California. He was drafted by the New York Mets in the fourth round of the 2022 Major League Baseball draft. He made his professional debut that year with the Florida Complex League Mets.

In 2023, Reimer played for the Florida Complex League Mets, St. Lucie Mets and Brooklyn Cyclones. He split the 2025 season between the Cyclones and the AA Binghamton Rumble Ponies, improving his fielding and hitting 17 home runs with a batting average of .282, an on-base percentage of .379 and a slugging percentage of .491. After the season he was rated the Mets' 6th best prospect by MLB.com.

- Career statistics from Baseball Reference (Minors)

=== Aidan Smith ===
Aidan Smith

New York Mets
- Outfielder
- Born: July 23, 2004 (age 22); Tulsa, Oklahoma, U.S.
- Bats: Right Throws: Right

Aidan Carlisle Smith (born July 23, 2004) is an American professional baseball outfielder in the New York Mets organization.

Smith attended Lovejoy High School in Lucas, Texas. As a senior in 2023, he hit .491 with seven home runs. He was selected by the Seattle Mariners in the fourth round of the 2023 Major League Baseball draft. He signed with the Mariners for $1.2 million, forgoing his commitment to play college baseball at Mississippi State University.

Smith made his professional debut after signing with the Arizona Complex League Mariners and also played with the Modesto Nuts, hitting .208 with one home run over 22 games. Smith returned to Modesto to open the 2024 season.

On July 25, 2024, the Mariners traded Smith to the Tampa Bay Rays along with Brody Hopkins and Ty Cummings in exchange for Randy Arozarena. The Rays assigned Smith to the Charleston RiverDogs with whom he finished the season. Over 97 games, he hit .288 with 11 home runs, 53 RBI, 33 doubles, and 41 stolen bases. Smith played the 2025 season with the Bowling Green Hot Rods and batted .237 with 14 home runs, 59 RBI, and 41 stolen bases. After the season, he played in the Arizona Fall League (AFL) with the Mesa Solar Sox. In an AFL game versus the Scottsdale Scorpions, Smith scored five runs despite recording no hits, which has happened only twice in Major League Baseball.

On August 2, 2026, the Rays traded Smith, Gary Gill Hill, and Émilien Pitre to the New York Mets in exchange for Freddy Peralta.

- Career statistics from MLB · ESPN · Fangraphs · Baseball Reference (Minors)

=== Sammy Stafura ===
Sammy Stafura
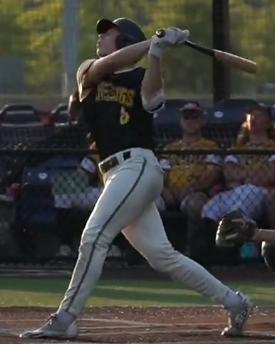
- Stafura in 2022

New York Mets
- Shortstop
- Born: November 15, 2004 (age 21); Cortlandt, New York, U.S.
- Bats: Right Throws: Right

Samuel Stafura (born November 15, 2004) is an American professional baseball shortstop in the New York Mets organization.

Stafura grew up in Cortlandt Manor, New York and attended Walter Panas High School from 2019–2023. He was named the New York Gatorade Baseball Player of the Year as a senior. Stafura committed to play college baseball at Clemson.

Stafura was selected by the Cincinnati Reds with the 43rd overall pick in the 2023 Major League Baseball draft. He signed with the team on July 17, 2023, and received an over-slot signing bonus of $2.497 million.

Stafura made his professional debut after signing with the Arizona Complex League Reds, appearing in 12 games. He opened the 2024 season with the Arizona Complex League Reds and was promoted after 15 games to the Daytona Tortugas, with whom he ended the year. Over 92 games between both teams, Stafura hit .270 with eight home runs, 54 RBIs, and 31 stolen bases. He was assigned back to Daytona to open the 2025 season.

On July 30, 2025, Stafura, Taylor Rogers, and cash considerations were traded to the Pittsburgh Pirates in exchange for third baseman Ke'Bryan Hayes. The Pirates assigned him to the Bradenton Marauders and quickly promoted him to the Greensboro Grasshoppers. Stafura played in a total of 119 games for the 2025 season and batted .238 with six home runs, 60 RBIs and 32 stolen bases.

On August 3, 2026, Stafura was traded to the New York Mets in exchange for Luke Weaver.

- Career statistics from Baseball Reference (Minors)

=== Chris Suero ===
Chris Suero

New York Mets
- Catcher
- Born: January 27, 2004 (age 22); The Bronx, New York, U.S.
- Bats: Right Throws: Right

Christopher Antonio Suero (born January 27, 2004) is an American professional baseball catcher in the New York Mets organization.

Suero was born in The Bronx, New York and attended All Hallows High School in the South Bronx for one year before moving to the Dominican Republic when he was 15. He signed with the New York Mets as an international free agent in March 2022. He made his professional debut that year with the Dominican Summer League Mets.

Suero played 2023 with the Florida Complex League Mets and 2024 with the St. Lucie Mets and Brooklyn Cyclones in May. He started 2025 with Brooklyn before being promoted to the Binghamton Rumble Ponies.

- Career statistics from Baseball Reference (Minors)

=== Will Watson ===
Will Watson

New York Mets
- Pitcher
- Born: November 7, 2002 (age 23); Mount Vernon, Washington, U.S.
- Bats: Right Throws: Right

William Joseph Watson (born November 7, 2002) is an American professional baseball pitcher in the New York Mets organization.

Watson attended Burlington-Edison High School in Burlington, Washington, and played college baseball at California Lutheran University in 2022, San Joaquin Delta College in 2023, and the University of Southern California (USC) in 2024. He was selected by the Seattle Mariners in the 20th round of the 2023 Major League Baseball draft, but did not sign. In 2024 for USC, Watson appeared in 16 games and went 5–2 with a 3.93 ERA and 46 strikeouts.

Watson was selected by the New York Mets in the seventh round of the 2024 Major League Baseball draft. He signed with the team and made his professional debut with the St. Lucie Mets, appearing in two games. Watson was assigned to St. Lucie to open the 2025 season and was promoted to the Brooklyn Cyclones in June. In August, he was promoted to the Binghamton Rumble Ponies. Over 28 games (23 starts) between the three teams, Watson went 3–9 with a 2.60 ERA and 142 strikeouts over 121 1/3 innings. Watson returned to Binghamton to open the 2026 season. He was placed on the injured list with an oblique injury during the season, and completed rehab assignments with St. Lucie and Brooklyn. Watson made nine starts for Binghamton and had a 0–6 record, an 8.16 ERA, and 27 strikeouts over 28 2/3 innings.

- Career statistics from Baseball Reference (Minors)
- USC Trojans bio

=== Jack Wenninger ===
Jack Wenninger

New York Mets
- Pitcher
- Born: March 14, 2002 (age 24); Barrington, Illinois, U.S.
- Bats: Left Throws: Right

Jonathan Andrew Wenninger Jr. (born March 14, 2002) is an American professional baseball pitcher in the New York Mets organization.

Wenninger attended Cary-Grove High School in Cary, Illinois, and played college baseball at Murray State University and the University of Illinois. As a junior at Illinois in 2023, he started 14 games and went 6–4 with a 4.71 ERA over 80 1/3 innings. After the season, he was selected by the New York Mets in the sixth round of the 2023 Major League Baseball draft. He signed with the team for $225,000.

Wenninger made his professional debut after signing and played with both the Florida Complex League Mets and St. Lucie Mets, appearing in two games total. He returned to St. Lucie to open the 2024 season and was promoted to the Brooklyn Cyclones in early July. Over 25 games (19 starts) between both teams, he pitched to a 4–6 record, a 4.30 ERA, and 140 strikeouts over 115 innings. Wenninger was assigned to the Binghamton Rumble Ponies to start the 2025 season and was named the team's Opening Day starter. He spent the whole season with Binghamton and started 26 games, going 12–6 with a 2.92 ERA and 147 strikeouts over 135 1/3 innings. Wenninger was assigned to the Syracuse Mets for the 2026 season. Over 26 games (22 starts), he had a 5–8 record, a 4.54 ERA, 123 strikeouts, and 68 walks across 115 innings.

- Career statistics from Baseball Reference (Minors)
- Murray State Racers bio
- Illinois Fighting Illini bio

=== Carson Wiggins ===
Carson Wiggins

New York Mets
- Pitcher
- Born: June 1, 2005 (age 21); Fort Smith, Arkansas, U.S.
- Bats: Right Throws: Right

Carson Lake Spier Wiggins (born June 1, 2005) is an American professional baseball pitcher in the New York Mets organization. He played college baseball for the Arkansas Razorbacks.

Wiggins attended Roland High School in Roland, Oklahoma and played college baseball at the University of Arkansas. Aa a freshman at Arkansas in 2025, he appeared in 14 games as a relief pitcher before suffering a season-ending elbow injury which required Tommy John Surgery. He finished the year with a 3.21 earned run average (ERA) and 20 strikeouts over 14 innings. He did not pitch for Arkansas in 2026 while rehabbing from the injury.

Wiggins was selected by the New York Mets 27th overall in the 2026 Major League Baseball draft. On July 15, Wiggins signed with the Mets for a full-slot $3.46 million signing bonus deal.

His brother, Jaxon Wiggins, pitches in the Chicago Cubs organization.

- Career statistics from Baseball Reference (Minors)

=== Calvin Ziegler ===
Calvin Ziegler
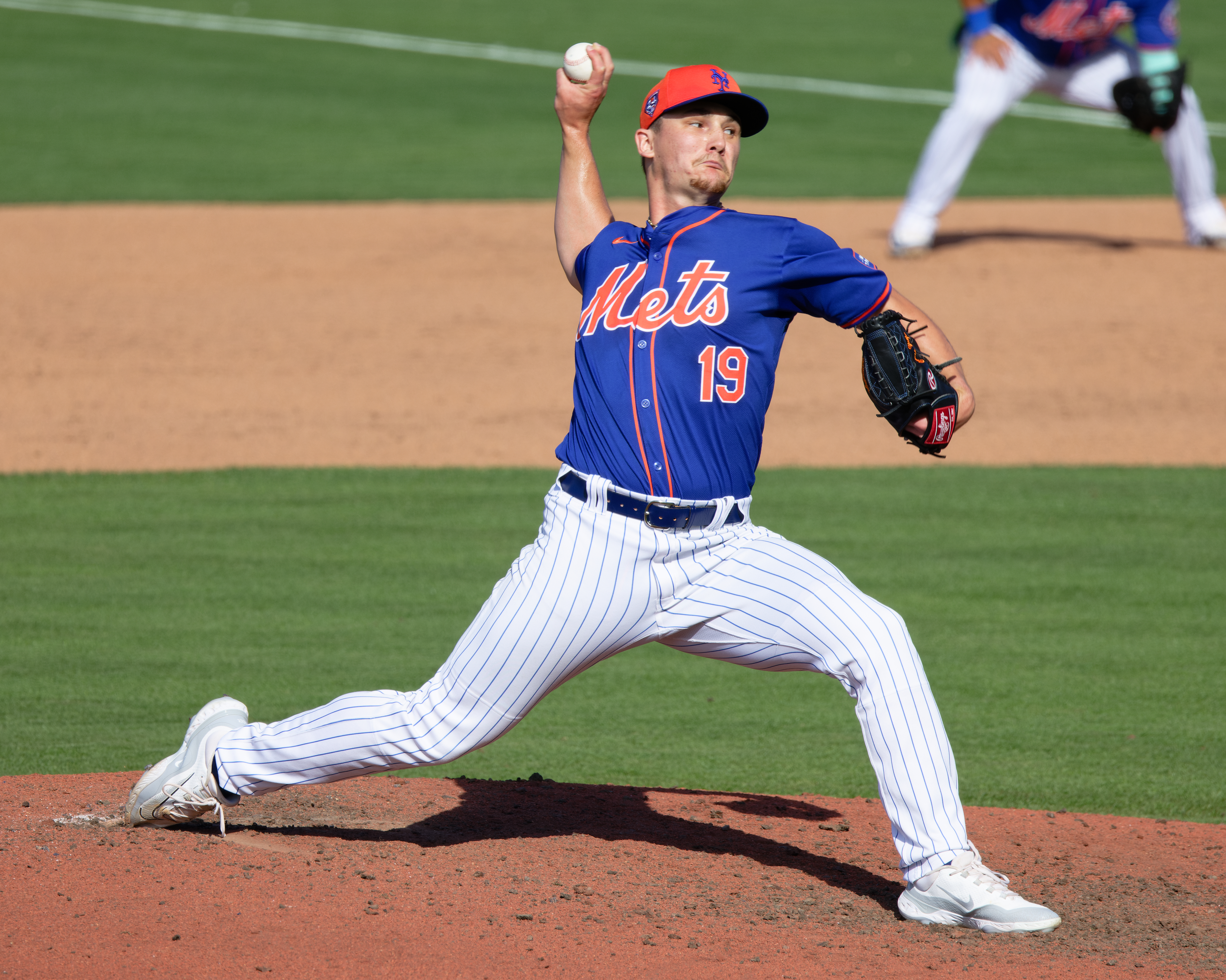
- Ziegler with the Mets in 2024

New York Mets
- Pitcher
- Born: October 3, 2002 (age 24); Kitchener, Canada
- Bats: Right Throws: Right

Calvin William Ziegler (born October 3, 2002) is a Canadian professional baseball pitcher in the New York Mets organization.

Ziegler was born in Canada and attended TNXL Academy in Ocoee, Florida, his senior year due to Canadian travel restrictions because of the COVID-19 pandemic. He was drafted by the New York Mets in the second round of the 2021 Major League Baseball draft.

Ziegler made his professional debut in 2022 with the St. Lucie Mets. In 16 starts, he went 0–6 with a 4.44 ERA and 70 strikeouts across 46 2/3 innings pitched.

In March 2023, Ziegler underwent surgery to remove bone spurs from his right elbow. While recovering from the procedure, he suffered a torn right quadriceps tendon and was ruled out for the season. However, on September 8, Ziegler was activated to make his season debut.

Ziegler began the 2024 season with High-A Brooklyn. On April 18, 2024, it was revealed that Ziegler would undergo Tommy John surgery, ending his season.

- Career statistics from Baseball Reference (Minors)

== Full Triple-A to Rookie League rosters ==
=== Triple-A ===
Syracuse Mets roster
Players		Coaches/Other
Pitchers: 56 Chris Devenski; 40 Zach Franklin; 62 Saul Garcia; 99 Gary Gill Hill; 64 Ofreidy Gomez; 65 Dan Hammer; 27 Ryan Lambert; 45 Tyler McLoughlin; 66 Brian Metoyer; 30 Jonathan Santucci; 73 Matt Seelinger; 46 Ben Simon; 49 Garrett Stratton; 51 Matt Turner; 57 Jack Wenninger; 71 Guillo Zuñiga *	Catchers: 29 Kevin Parada; Infielders: 11 Billy Amick; 2 Vidal Bruján; 20 Ryan Clifford; 26 Nick Lorusso; 50 Émilien Pitre; 4 Jefferson Rojas; Outfielders: 39 José Ramos; 70 D'Andre Smith; Designated hitters: 1 MJ Melendez	Manager: 23 Dick Scott; Coaches: 44 Nate Irving (hitting); 58 Troy Miller (assistant pitching); 35 John Nogowski (bench); 44 A. J. Sager (pitching); 60-day injured list: -- José Marte; 7-day injured list; * On New York Mets 40-man roster; ~ Development list; # Rehab assignment; ∞ Reserve list; ‡ Restricted list; § Suspended list; † Temporarily inactive list; Roster updated September 29, 2026; Transactions; → More rosters: MiLB • International League; → New York Mets minor league players

=== Double-A ===
Binghamton Rumble Ponies roster
Players		Coaches/Other
Pitchers: 38 Justin Armbruester; 19 Parker Carlson; 27 Bryce Conley; 4 Felipe De La Cruz; 26 Danis Correa; 31 Gabe Davis; 36 Ryan Dollar; 15 Luke Gabrysh ~; 34 Dakota Hawkins; 35 Brendan Girton; 29 Cristofer Gomez; 21 R.J. Gordon; 7 Max Green; 26 Carlos Guzman; 10 Noah Hall; 2 Bryce Jenkins; 45 Douglas Orellana; 28 Gabriel Rodriguez; 26 Luis R. Rodriguez; 33 Joander Suarez; 17 Will Watson	Catchers: 1 Vincent Perozo; 11 Chris Suero; Infielders: 30 Jamari Baylor; 37 Corey Collins; 24 Eddinson Paulino; 23 Jacob Reimer; 13 Marco Vargas; 22 Mitch Voit; Outfielders: 12 John Bay; 6 JT Benson; 14 Yohairo Cuevas; 33 Eli Serrano III	Manager: 18 Michael Collins; Coaches: 32 Matt Carasiti (pitching); 25 Mariano Duncan (bench); 5 Rachel Folden (hitting); 9 Jake Hager (assistant hitting); 60-day injured list: 33 Channing Austin; -- Joshua Cornielly (full season); 7-day injured list; * On New York Mets 40-man roster; ~ Development list; # Rehab assignment; ∞ Reserve list; ‡ Restricted list; § Suspended list; † Temporarily inactive list; Roster updated September 15, 2026; Transactions; → More rosters: MiLB • Eastern League; → New York Mets minor league players

=== High-A ===
Brooklyn Cyclones roster
Players		Coaches/Other
Pitchers: 35 Juan Arnaud; 15 Josh Blum; 12 Nicolas Carreno; 56 Jose Chirinos; 15 Irving Cota; 58 Joel Díaz; 38 Hunter Hodges; 21 Daviel Hurtado; 28 Gregori Louis; 48 Ernesto Mercedes; 29 Elwis Mijares; 43 Brady Miller; 8 Emilio Obispo; 9 Joe Scarborough; 49 Rafi Vazquez; 8 Conner Ware; 54 Calvin Ziegler	Catchers: 33 Daiverson Gutierrez; 4 Ronald Hernandez; 34 Chase Meggers; 39 Alejandro Urias; Infielders: 23 Yonatan Henriquez; 10 Colin Houck; 55 Antonio Jimenez; 13 Cole Mathis; 60 Elian Peña; 2 Trey Snyder; 1 Sammy Stafura; Outfielders: 40 Randy Guzman; 30 Aiden Robbins; 25 Aidan Smith; 6 John Smith III; 7 John Spikerman	Manager: 11 Eduardo Nunez; Coaches: 26 Luis Alvarado (pitching); 44 Dallas Burke (bench); 20 Devin DeYoung (hitting); 60-day injured list: 65 Ryan Ammons (full season); -- Eli Ankeney (full season); -- Boston Baro; -- Hoss Brewer; 58 Frank Camarillo (full season); 48 Felix Cepeda; -- Wyatt Hudepohl; -- Estarling Mercado (full season); -- Austin Troesser (full season); -- Alejandro Urias; 7-day injured list; * On New York Mets 40-man roster; ~ Development list; # Rehab assignment; ∞ Reserve list; ‡ Restricted list; § Suspended list; † Temporarily inactive list; Roster updated September 11, 2026; Transactions; → More rosters: MiLB • South Atlantic League; → New York Mets minor league players

=== Single-A ===
St. Lucie Mets roster
Players		Coaches/Other
Pitchers: 39 Brett Banks; 44 Jean Brito ~; 48 Irving Cota #; 66 Zach Crotchfelt ~; 28 Candido Cuevas; 63 Jose Guevara ~; 77 Gavin Guidry; 70 Nathan Hall ~; 22 Nate Isler; 53 Jonathan Jimenez; 52 Aidan Keenan; 68 Landon Koenig; 45 AJ Krodel; 67 Ethan Lanthier ~; 58 Joel Lara; 39 Camden Lohman ~; 61 Jose Lopez; 33 Zack Mack; 40 Luke McNeillie; 57 Miguel Mejias; 59 Roberto Pena ~; 55 Alex Petrovic; 59 Peyton Prescott ~; 29 Cesar Rivera ~; 32 Christian Rodriguez; 62 Shane Sdao; 35 Luis Sotillo ~; 56 Dillon Stiltner ~; 45 Cam Tilly; 60 Owen Woodward ~; 25 Caden Wooster	Catchers: 21 Yovanny Rodriguez; 20 Ryan Tayman; 59 Francisco Toledo ∞; 13 Julio Zayas; Infielders: 50 Bruin Agbayani; 56 Yunior Amparo; 2 Boston Baro #; 54 Dylan Carey; 10 Branny De Oleo; 75 Vladi Gomez; 4 Jake Ogden; 83 Jeremy Rodriguez; 27 Reed Stallman; Outfielders: 12 Bohan Adderley; 49 Kuhio Aloy; 3 Jack Toomey; 11 Wyatt Vincent	Manager: 9 Luis Rivera; Coaches: 30 Jonathan Cramman (bench); 51 David Mervis (pitching); 23 Bryan Muniz (hitting); 40 Jimmy Nelson (assistant pitching); 60-day injured list: 26 Austin Brown; 60 Jorge De Leon; -- Jace Hampson (full season); 20 Edward Lantigua; -- Wilson Lopez; -- Edgar Moreta; 7-day injured list; * On New York Mets 40-man roster; ~ Development list; # Rehab assignment; ∞ Reserve list; ‡ Restricted list; § Suspended list; † Temporarily inactive list; Roster updated September 20, 2026; Transactions; → More rosters: MiLB • Florida State League; → New York Mets minor league players

=== Rookie ===
Florida Complex League Mets roster
Players		Coaches/Other
Pitchers: -- Sam Carlisle; -- A.J. Colarusso; -- Cooper Dossett; 66 Julio Gonzalez; -- Dustin Hagens Jr.; 29 Wilmer Lugo; -- Carson Wiggins ∞	Catchers: -- Jacob Madrid; 26 Yeider Mindiola; 19 Josmir Reyes; Infielders: 55 Diover De Aza; 48 Carter Dierdorf; 1 Anthony Frobose; 13 Roybert Herrera; -- Danny Melendez; 4 Kooper Schulte; 11 Yorber Semprun; Outfielders: -- Keegan O'Hearn; 50 Justin Ramirez; 30 Heriberto Rincon	Manager: 3 Lino Diaz; Coaches: 48 Garrett Baker (pitching); 68 Wander Cabrera (pitching); 76 Alejandro Diaz (hitting); 20 Buddy Fultz (bench); 79 Ruben Sosa (hitting); 60-day injured list: -- Peter Kussow (full season); -- Yordan Rodriguez (full season); 7-day injured list; * On New York Mets 40-man roster; ~ Development list; # Rehab assignment; ∞ Reserve list; ‡ Restricted list; § Suspended list; † Temporarily inactive list; Roster updated September 28, 2026; Transactions; → More rosters: MiLB • Florida Complex League; → New York Mets minor league players

=== Foreign Rookie ===
Dominican Summer League Mets Blue roster
Players		Coaches/Other
Pitchers: 65 Greison Acosta; 55 Yunior Canario; 56 Isaac De La Cruz; 62 Cristian Dudamel; 27 Enmanuel Feliz; 78 Victor Gallegos; 49 Sebastian Gomez; 81 Cristopher Hernandez; 80 Oscar Montero; 63 Wranigher Navas; 38 Mauricio Nunez; 40 Jhony Osoria; 58 Eduardo Pina; 77 Edgardo Rodriguez; 48 Leyvi Rodriguez; 10 Gensil Rosario; 83 Arnaldo Tejada; 29 Alsy Torres; 82 Josbel Torrez; 39 Maykol Vasquez	Catchers: 13 Jesus Griman; 85 Adrian La Rosa; 15 Adrian Silva; Infielders: 11 Cristopher Jaquez; 12 Jesus Minaya; 3 Angel Osuna; 30 Oscar Pena; Outfielders: 23 Emerson Estevez; 9 Yeremy Reyes; 20 Ryan Rudas; 4 Elvis Teran	Manager: -- J.C. Rodriguez; Coaches: -- Dan Cataline (hitting); -- Juan Martinez (pitching); 60-day injured list: 78 Angel Montero; 3 Georwill Rodriguez; 54 Giomar Ubiera; 7-day injured list; * On New York Mets 40-man roster; ~ Development list; # Rehab assignment; ∞ Reserve list; ‡ Restricted list; § Suspended list; † Temporarily inactive list; Roster updated September 23, 2026; Transactions; → More rosters: MiLB • Dominican Summer League; → New York Mets minor league players

Dominican Summer League Mets Orange roster
Players		Coaches/Other
Pitchers: 39 Olmedo Barria; 34 Aurelvys Batista; 64 Randy Guzman; 52 Maxgregori Harvey; 57 Henderson Hernandez; 20 Frandy Lora; 11 Jhoangel Marquez; 65 Esteban Mejia; 22 Abner Meza; 48 Cesar Morales; 60 Anderson Ozuna; 61 Jorarlin Perez; 33 Derlin Rojas; 67 Yobanny Sanchez; 25 Biguey Santana; 66 Arturo Sevilla; 71 Randiel Vicente; 45 Jose Vielma	Catchers: 28 Cesar Acosta; 4 Yadier Fuentes; 1 Frank Moreno; 32 Jose Serracin; Infielders: 15 Wandy Asigen; -- Michelle Mercedes; 51 Dayron Oramas; 2 Jose Padilla; 30 Johnderis Sanchez; 59 Sebastian Toro; Outfielders: 50 Aiberson Blanco; -- Royner Bravo; 3 Jhonael Cuello; 26 Anthony Delgado; 49 Henry Manrique; 13 Cleiner Ramirez; 55 Jonnhan Sanchez	Manager: -- Felix Fermin Jr.; Coaches: -- Miguel Alfonseca (pitching); -- Jose Mena (hitting); 60-day injured list: 75 Cristopher Del Orbe; -- Darling Perez; 7-day injured list; * On New York Mets 40-man roster; ~ Development list; # Rehab assignment; ∞ Reserve list; ‡ Restricted list; § Suspended list; † Temporarily inactive list; Roster updated September 10, 2026; Transactions; → More rosters: MiLB • Dominican Summer League; → New York Mets minor league players
