= Jersey Shore BlueClaws =

- Founded in 2001; Lakewood, New Jersey
Team logo
Cap insignia

Minor league affiliations
- Class: High-A (2021–present)
- Previous classes: Class A (2001–2020)
- League: South Atlantic League (2001–present)
- Division: North Division

Major league affiliations
- Team: Philadelphia Phillies (2001–present)

Minor league titles
- League titles (3): 2006; 2009; 2010
- Division titles (5): 2006; 2009; 2010; 2016; 2018
- Second-half titles (1): 2023

Team data
- Name: Jersey Shore BlueClaws (2021–present)
- Previous names: Lakewood BlueClaws (2001–2020)
- Colors: Phillies red, dark Atlantic blue, crab blue, golden yellow
- Ballpark: ShoreTown Ballpark (2001–present)
- Owner/ Operator: Shore Town Baseball
- General manager: Bob McLane
- Manager: Mycal Jones
- Website: milb.com/jersey-shore

The Jersey Shore BlueClaws (formerly Lakewood BlueClaws) are a Minor League Baseball team of the South Atlantic League and the High-A affiliate of the Philadelphia Phillies. They are located in Lakewood, New Jersey, and are named for their location on the Jersey Shore and the blue crabs native to the area. The BlueClaws play their home games at ShoreTown Ballpark.

== History ==
Following the 2000 season, the Cape Fear Crocs of the Class A South Atlantic League relocated to Lakewood, New Jersey, and became the Lakewood BlueClaws. The BlueClaws became an affiliate of the Philadelphia Phillies, who moved their Class A affiliation from the Piedmont Boll Weevils in Kannapolis, North Carolina, to Lakewood beginning with the 2001 season. The team was owned by the New-Jersey-born Joe Plumeri and Joe Finley, also owners of the Trenton Thunder.

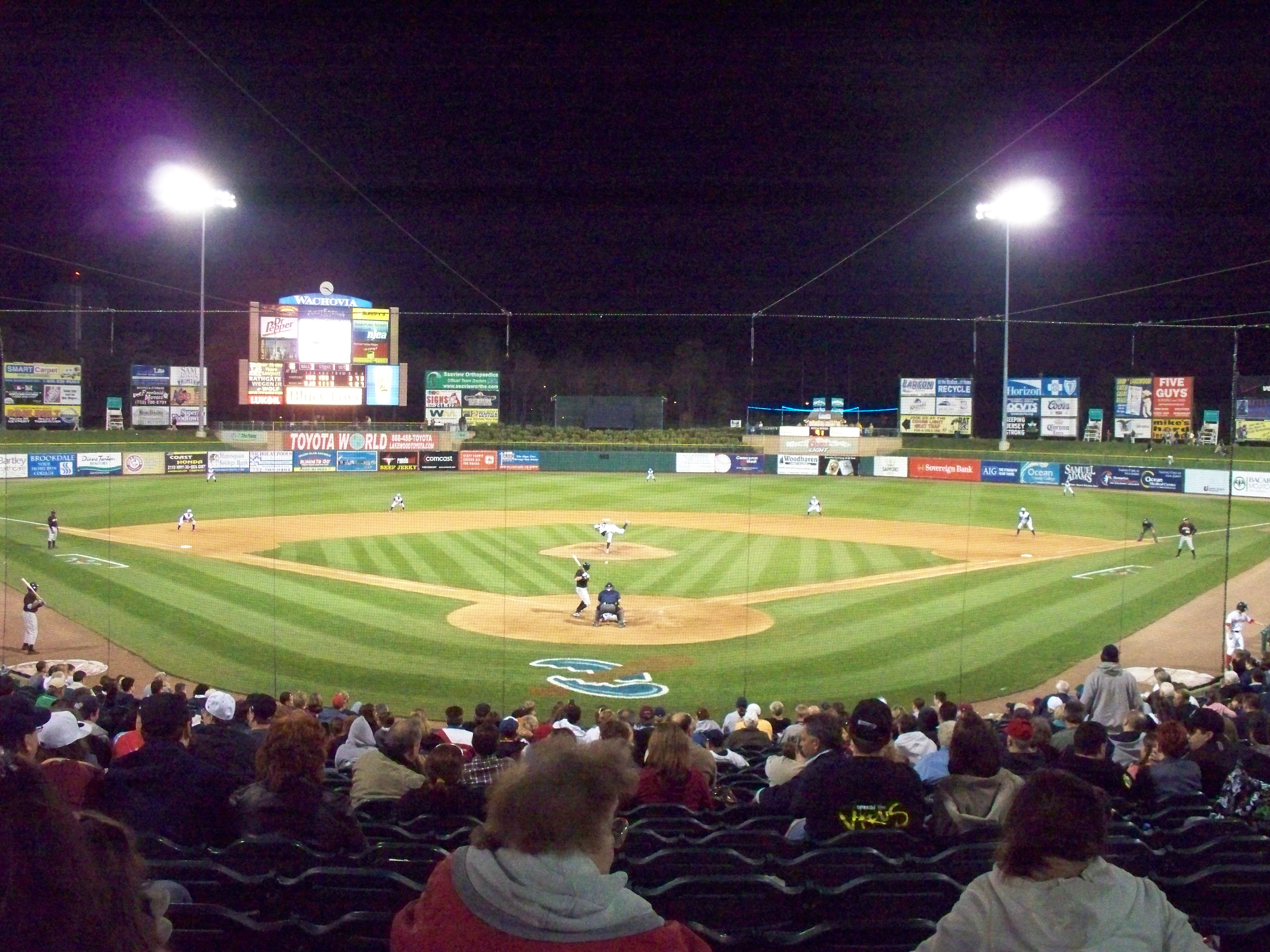
The BlueClaws play their home games at ShoreTown Ballpark.

Since their arrival in New Jersey, the BlueClaws have been a success at the gate. In each of their first five seasons, they averaged over 6,500 people per game. The team led the South Atlantic League in either average or total attendance every year through 2016, and became the fastest team in league history to reach the two and three million fan attendance mark. On August 26, 2002, the BlueClaws set a South Atlantic League record when 13,003 people attended a 3–0 win over the Hickory Crawdads. This box office success comes in the absence of great success on the field. In their first five seasons, the BlueClaws failed to qualify for the playoffs. Their overall record topped the .500 mark for the first time in 2004.

On September 1, 2004, Ryan Howard became the first former BlueClaw to play in Major League Baseball, playing first base for the Phillies in a 7–2 loss to the Atlanta Braves at Citizens Bank Park. He played for the BlueClaws in the 2002 season. In 2005, he was named the National League Rookie of the Year, and in 2006 he was named the National League Most Valuable Player. In May 2007, while on the 15-day disabled list, Howard played two rehab games with the BlueClaws after suffering a hamstring injury. Each game drew over 8,000 fans and helped push the BlueClaws to a new team attendance record for the month of May. In addition to Howard, several former BlueClaws played for the 2008 World Champion Philadelphia Phillies. World Series MVP Cole Hamels was with Lakewood in 2003, and starting catcher Carlos Ruiz was a member of the original Lakewood BlueClaws' roster in 2001.

The BlueClaws were sold to Shore Town Baseball in July 2017. The new ownership group includes Minor League Baseball veteran and former Mandalay Baseball Properties CEO Art Matin, as well as local investors Bob Tamashunas and Bill Luby.

The team rebranded as the Jersey Shore BlueClaws after the 2020 season. In conjunction with Major League Baseball's restructuring of Minor League Baseball in 2021, the BlueClaws were organized into the High-A East. In 2022, the High-A East became known as the South Atlantic League, the name historically used by the regional circuit prior to the 2021 reorganization.

== Season-by-season records ==
Season	Affiliation	Manager	First Half Record	Second Half Record
2001	Phillies	Greg Legg	28–42, 7th place North	32–37, 5th place North
2002	Phillies	Jeff Manto	33–36, 6th place North	36–34, 5th place North
2003	Phillies	Buddy Biancalana	22–47, 8th place North	35–34, 3rd place North
2004	Phillies	P. J. Forbes	31–36, 7th place North	39–30, 3rd place North
2005	Phillies	P. J. Forbes	25–45, 6th place North	31–38, 7th place North
2006	Phillies	Dave Huppert	37–32, 4th place North	47–23, 1st place North
2007	Phillies	Steve Roadcap	33–32, 3rd place North	36–33, 2nd place North
2008	Phillies	Steve Roadcap	38–32, 3rd place North	42–28, 2nd place North
2009	Phillies	Dusty Wathan	42–26, 1st place North	36–32, 4th place North
2010	Phillies	Mark Parent	42–28, 1st place North	42–27, 1st place North
2011	Phillies	Chris Truby	33–35, 7th place North	35–34, 5th place North
2012	Phillies	Mickey Morandini	26–43, 6th place North	36–33, 4th place North
2013	Phillies	Mickey Morandini	26–41, 7th place North	30–39, 6th place North
2014	Phillies	Greg Legg	27–42, 6th place North	26–42, 7th place North
2015	Phillies	Shawn Williams	33–35, 6th place North	40–30, 2nd place North
2016	Phillies	Shawn Williams	29–40, 6th place North	45–25, 1st place North
2017	Phillies	Marty Malloy	40–30, 2nd place North	33–36, 5th place North
2018	Phillies	Marty Malloy	41–28, 1st place North	46–23, 1st place North
2019	Phillies	Mike Micucci	29–41, 6th place North	29–39
2020	Phillies	Season cancelled (COVID-19 pandemic)		
2021	Phillies	Chris Adamson	56–62, 3rd place North	
2022	Phillies	Keith Werman	25-41, 6th place North	26-40 6th place North
2023	Phillies	Greg Brodzinski	35-30, 3rd place North	38-28 1st place North
2024	Phillies	Greg Brodzinski	38-28 2nd place North	36-30 3rd place North
2025	Phillies	Greg Brodzinski	25-38 5th place North	37-27 3rd place North

=== Postseason records ===
The BlueClaws won the 2006 South Atlantic League championship on September 15, first defeating the Lexington Legends in the Northern Division final, two games to none, then defeating the Augusta GreenJackets in a dramatic 5–0 victory, winning the championship series, three games to one.

In 2009, the BlueClaws won the South Atlantic League championship by first defeating the Kannapolis Intimidators, 9–0, and winning the series by two games to none in the Northern Division final. In the championship round, the BlueClaws defeated the Greenville Drive, 5–1, in game four and then took the series, three games to one.

In 2010, the BlueClaws won both halves of the season. They became the first team to do so and win the championship, defeating Hickory, two games to one, in the Northern Division final and the Greenville Drive, three games to one, in a rematch series.

In 2016, the BlueClaws opened the first half of the season in sixth place in the Northern Division but rallied to take the second half crown. The BlueClaws then defeated the Hagerstown Suns, two games to zero, but fell in the South Atlantic League final series, three games to one, versus the Rome Braves.

In 2018, the BlueClaws won both halves of the season only to lose in the South Atlantic League final against the Lexington Legends. The BlueClaws won the Northern Division championship against the Kannapolis Intimidaters.

In 2023, the BlueClaws lost in the semifinals to the Hudson Valley Renegades 2-1.

== Roster ==
Jersey Shore BlueClaws roster
Players	Coaches/Other
Pitchers: 14 Juan Amarante; 38 Keegan Batka; 25 Brandon Beckel; 54 Ryan Drombowski; 44 Reese Dutton; 35 Jake Eddington; 9 Luke Gabrysh; 22 Mavis Graves; 36 Tanner Gresham; 21 Sam Highfill; 31 Camron Hill; 5 Titan Kennedy-Hayes; 48 Ramon Marquez; 41 Micah Ottenbreit; 6 Jose Pena Jr.; 20 Adilson Peralta; 28 Cody Powker; 8 Danyony Pulido; 30 Giussepe Velasquez; -- Kevin Warunek; Catchers: 11 Lou Albrecht; 12 Luis Caicuto; 32 Luke Davis; 18 Kodey Shojinaga; Infielders: 2 Trent Farquhar; 13 Brandon Lewis; 10 Tyler Miller; 15 Tyler Pettorini; 3 Devin Saltiban; 7 Daunte Stuart; 26 Brock Vradenburg; Outfielders: 24 Nick Biddison; 27 Joel Dragoo; 4 Carter Mathison; 7 John Spikerman	Manager: 1 Mycal Jones; Coaches: 50 Ryan Buchter (pitching); 16 Orlando Munoz (coach); 33 Darnell Sweeney (hitting); 45 Ryan Wrobleski (assistant hitting); 60-day injured list: -- Ethan Chenault (full season); 10 Brady Day; -- Casey Steward (full season); 7-day injured list; * On Philadelphia Phillies 40-man roster; ~ Development list; # Rehab assignment; ∞ Reserve list; ‡ Restricted list; § Suspended list; † Temporarily inactive list; Roster updated July 7, 2026; Transactions; → More rosters: MiLB • South Atlantic League; → Philadelphia Phillies minor league players

== Retired numbers ==
Cole Hamels' number 19 and Ryan Howard's number 29 have been retired by the BlueClaws.

== Notable alumni ==
- Ezequiel Astacio
- Rod Barajas (2007)
- Danny Bautista (1991–1992)
- Michael Bourn (2004) 2-time MLB All-Star
- Milton Bradley (1998) MLB All-Star
- Eude Brito (2001)
- Taylor Buchholz (2002)
- Carlos Carrasco
- Frank Catalanotto (1994)
- Francisco Cordero (1995–1996) 3-time MLB All-Star
- Kyle Drabek
- Juan Encarnacion (1994–1995)
- Gavin Floyd (2002)
- Travis Fryman (1998) 5-time MLB All-Star
- Greg Golson MLB All-Star
- Cole Hamels (2003, 2006) 4-time MLB All-Star; 2008 World Series Most Valuable Player
- J. A. Happ (2005)
- Ryan Howard (2002, 2007, 2010) 3-time MLB All-Star; 2005 NL Rookie of the Year; 2006 NL Most Valuable Player
- Gabe Kapler (1996) 2021 National League Manager of the Year
- Kyle Kendrick (2004, 2006)
- Scott Kingery (born 1994)
- Cliff Lee (2000) 4-time MLB All-Star; 2008 AL Cy Young Award
- Scott Mathieson
- Lou Marson
- Chris Roberson
- Carlos Ruiz (2001) MLB All-Star
- Alfredo Simon (2003) MLB All-Star
- Scott Strickland (1996, 1998)
- Justin Thompson (1992, 1996) MLB All-Star
- Robinson Tejeda
- Shane Victorino (2007) 2-time MLB All-Star
- Luke Williams
- Randy Wolf (2006) MLB All-Star
- Tim Worrell (2005)
- Mike Zagurski
- Josh Zeid (2010)
