= List of South Atlantic League team rosters =

Each of the 12 teams of Minor League Baseball's South Atlantic League carry a 30-man active roster. Only these players are eligible to play.

Teams may have any number of inactive players on their rosters at a given time who do not count toward active roster limits. Injured players may be placed on the injured list (7-day or 60-day). The temporary inactive list and bereavement list are for players attending to personal matters. Major league players may be placed on rosters for injury rehabilitation for a maximum of 20 days for non-pitchers and 30 days for pitchers.

Players who are ineligible to play due to failure to adhere to the Minor League Drug Prevention and Treatment Program, violations of their contract, who are receiving team disciplinary action, or who are unable to join the team due to visa problems may be placed on the restricted or suspended lists. These players count against a team's active roster limit.

Each team usually has a three-man coaching staff including a manager, hitting coach, and pitching coach. Depending on each Major League Baseball organization's development approach, some teams may have additional coaches.

== North Division ==
=== Brooklyn Cyclones ===
Brooklyn Cyclones roster
Players	Coaches/Other
Pitchers: 56 Adbert Alzolay #; 35 Juan Arnaud; -- Josh Blum; 51 Hoss Brewer; 58 Frank Camarillo; 45 Parker Carlson; 48 Felix Cepeda; 2 Danis Correa; 15 Irving Cota; 27 Joel Díaz ~; 50 Ryan Dollar; 29 Cristofer Gomez; 22 Noah Hall; 34 Dakota Hawkins; 38 Hunter Hodges; -- Wyatt Hudepohl; 21 Daviel Hurtado; 57 Joe Jacques #; 30 Bryce Jenkins; 43 Brady Miller; 28 Gregori Louis; -- Luis R. Rodriguez; 49 Garrett Stratton; 1 Tanner Witt; -- Calvin Ziegler; Catchers: 33 Daiverson Gutierrez; 4 Ronald Hernandez; Infielders: 6 Corey Collins; 23 Yonatan Henriquez; 10 Colin Houck; 8 Diego Mosquera; 12 Nick Roselli; 55 Mitch Voit; 3 Trace Willhoite; Outfielders: 7 John Bay; 25 JT Benson; 59 Sam Biller	Manager: 11 Eduardo Nunez; Coaches: 26 Luis Alvarado (pitching); 44 Dallas Burke (bench); 20 Devin DeYoung (hitting); 60-day injured list: 65 Ryan Ammons (full season); -- Eli Ankeney (full season); -- Boston Baro; -- Candido Cuevas; -- Estarling Mercado (full season); -- Austin Troesser (full season); -- Alejandro Urias; -- Owen Woodward; 7-day injured list; * On New York Mets 40-man roster; ~ Development list; # Rehab assignment; ∞ Reserve list; ‡ Restricted list; § Suspended list; † Temporarily inactive list; Roster updated May 22, 2026; Transactions; → More rosters: MiLB • South Atlantic League; → New York Mets minor league players

=== Frederick Keys ===
Frederick Keys roster
Players	Coaches/Other
Pitchers: 50 Boston Bateman; 41 Bradley Brehmer ^{#}; 28 Ryan Cabarcas; 54 Yeiber Cartaya; 66 Eccel Correa; 34 Jacob Cravey; -- Jack Crowder; 40 Sayer Diederich; 18 Carson Dorsey; 27 Brandon Downer; 52 Joe Glassey; 40 Raimon Gomez; 14 Caden Hunter; 65 Todd Kniebbe; 47 Kiefer Lord; 44 Chandler Marsh; 13 Twine Palmer; 9 JT Quinn; 32 Braeden Sloan; -- Tanner Smith; Catchers: 15 Yasmil Bucce; 11 Ike Irish; 10 Ryan Stafford; 2 Colin Tuft; Infielders: 25 Wehiwa Aloy; 38 Leandro Arias; 46 Elis Cuevas; 24 Victor Figueroa; 23 Luis Vázquez ^{#}; 62 Alfredo Velásquez; 16 Colin Yeaman; Outfielders: 6 RJ Austin; 1 Nate George; 7 Vance Honeycutt; 39 Braylin Tavera	Manager: 21 Collin Woody; Coaches: 36 Jordie Henry (pitching); 17 Teegan Leader (development); -- Jake Ratz (hitting); 26 Chase Sebby (fundamentals); 60-day injured list: -- Chase Allsup (full season); -- Holden deJong; -- Hayden Nierman (full season); -- Grabiel Salazar (full season); -- Luis Sánchez; -- Teddy Sharkey; -- Trent Turzenski; 7-day injured list; * On Baltimore Orioles 40-man roster; ~ Development list; # Rehab assignment; ∞ Reserve list; ‡ Restricted list; § Suspended list; † Temporarily inactive list; Roster updated May 26, 2026; Transactions; → More rosters: MiLB • South Atlantic League; → Baltimore Orioles minor league players

=== Hudson Valley Renegades ===
Hudson Valley Renegades roster
Players	Coaches/Other
Pitchers: 31 Thomas Balboni Jr.; 34 Bryce Cunningham; 27 Brandon Decker; 35 Allen Facundo; 12 Rory Fox; 11 Jackson Fristoe; 8 Franyer Herrera; 2 Brady Kirtner; 4 Andrew Landry; 0 Sean Paul Liñan; 21 Aaron Nixon; 36 Hansel Rincon; 20 Yerry Rodríguez; 17 Tony Rossi; 26 Wilmy Sanchez; 19 Luis Serna; 29 Jack Sokol; 43 Bryce Warrecker; Catchers: 3 Josue Gonzalez; 23 Diomedes Hernandez; Infielders: 9 Roderick Arias; 10 Core Jackson; 6 Kaeden Kent; 22 Josh Moylan; 7 Enmanuel Tejeda; 39 Kyle West; Outfielders: 2 Robbie Burnett; 1 Cole Gabrielson; 13 Eric Genther; 14 Wilson Rodriguez; 15 Camden Troyer; 24 Tyler Wilson	Manager: 93 Aaron Bossi; Coaches: 5 Chase Gerbrick (defensive); 44 Scott Nestor (hitting); 41 Ryan Mossman (pitching); 60-day injured list: -- Ocean Gabonia (full season); -- Brian Hendry; 20 Pico Kohn; 7-day injured list; * On New York Yankees 40-man roster; ~ Development list; # Rehab assignment; ∞ Reserve list; ‡ Restricted list; § Suspended list; † Temporarily inactive list; Roster updated May 21, 2026; Transactions; → More rosters: MiLB • South Atlantic League; → New York Yankees minor league players

=== Jersey Shore BlueClaws ===
Jersey Shore BlueClaws roster
Players	Coaches/Other
Pitchers: 14 Juan Amarante; 47 Luis Avila; 49 Gabriel Barbosa; 38 Keegan Batka; 43 Andrew Bechtold #; 25 Brandon Beckel; 23 Ryan Degges; 54 Ryan Drombowski; 44 Reese Dutton; 35 Jake Eddington; 9 Luke Gabrysh; 22 Mavis Graves; 21 Sam Highfill; 31 Camron Hill; 10 Estibenzon Jimenez #; 5 Titan Kennedy-Hayes; 34 Wen-Hui Pan; 6 Jose Pena Jr.; 20 Adilson Peralta; 8 Danyony Pulido; 30 Giussepe Velasquez; -- Kevin Warunek; Catchers: 12 Luis Caicuto; 32 Luke Davis; 18 Kodey Shojinaga; Infielders: 13 Jose Colmenares; 2 Trent Farquhar; 15 Tyler Pettorini; 3 Devin Saltiban; 11 Raider Tello; 26 Brock Vradenburg; Outfielders: 28 Keaton Anthony #; 24 Nick Biddison; 27 Joel Dragoo; 17 Manolfi Jimenez; 4 Carter Mathison; 7 John Spikerman	Manager: 1 Mycal Jones; Coaches: 50 Ryan Buchter (pitching); 16 Orlando Munoz (coach); 33 Darnell Sweeney (hitting); 45 Ryan Wrobleski (assistant hitting); 60-day injured list: -- Ethan Chenault (full season); 10 Brady Day; -- Micah Ottenbreit; -- Casey Steward (full season); 7-day injured list; * On Philadelphia Phillies 40-man roster; ~ Development list; # Rehab assignment; ∞ Reserve list; ‡ Restricted list; § Suspended list; † Temporarily inactive list; Roster updated May 26, 2026; Transactions; → More rosters: MiLB • South Atlantic League; → Philadelphia Phillies minor league players

=== Wilmington Blue Rocks ===
Wilmington Blue Rocks roster
Players	Coaches/Other
Pitchers: 25 Pablo Aldonis; 29 Austin Amaral; 39 Merrick Baldo; 47 Tucker Biven; 35 Adam Boucher; 10 Gavin Bruni; 40 Kevin Davis; 26 Brady Hill; 19 Eiker Huizi; 32 Yeuris Jimenez; 45 Isaac Lyon; 23 Riley Maddox; 16 Euri Montero; 22 Bryan Polanco; 38 Josh Randall; -- Travis Sthele; 46 Baron Stuart; 37 Yoel Tejeda Jr.; -- Mikey Tepper; Catchers: 24 Kevin Bazzell; 48 Caleb Farmer; 5 Nate Rombach; 14 Matt Suggs; Infielders: 12 Ronny Cruz; 6 Randal Diaz; 11 Gavin Dugas; 15 Angel Feliz; 3 Devin Fitz-Gerald; 44 Hunter Hines; 8 Jorgelys Mota; 28 Ethan Petry; Outfielders: 17 Teo Banks; 1 Yeremy Cabrera; 27 Elijah Green; 13 Cristhian Vaquero; 2 T.J. White	Manager: 7 Ted Tom; Coaches: 4 Mitchell Boe (defensive); 30 Hudson Byorick (hitting); 31 Niko Leontarakis (assistant pitching); 43 Justin Lord (pitching); 40 Jefferson Valladares (coach); 60-day injured list: -- Adam Bloebaum; 7-day injured list; * On Washington Nationals 40-man roster; ~ Development list; # Rehab assignment; ∞ Reserve list; ‡ Restricted list; § Suspended list; † Temporarily inactive list; Roster updated May 20, 2026; Transactions; → More rosters: MiLB • South Atlantic League; → Washington Nationals minor league players

== South Division ==
=== Asheville Tourists ===
Asheville Tourists roster
Players	Coaches/Other
Pitchers: 36 Jordan Carr; 19 Anthony Cruz; 21 Nolan DeVos; 15 Francisco Frias; 32 Cole Hertzler; 17 Dylan Howard; 33 Colby Langford; 99 Eurys Martich; 23 Joan Ogando; 28 Alain Pena; 14 Luis Rodriguez; 41 Raimy Rodriguez; 2 Yeriel Santos; 39 Conor Steinberg; 35 Parker Smith; 31 Andrew Taylor; 29 Nate Wohlgemuth; -- Nico Zeglin; Catchers: 38 Freuddy Batista; 13 John Garcia; 34 Hemmanuel Rosario; 27 Keduar Trujillo; Infielders: 3 Narbe Cruz; 10 Zach Daudet; 9 Alejandro Nunez; 11 Reylin Perez; 7 Caden Powell; 1 Kyle Walker; Outfielders: 18 Drew Brutcher; 26 Chase Call; 16 Ethan Frey; 8 Cesar Hernandez; 5 Mason Lytle; 4 Justin Thomas Jr.	Manager: 25 Nate Shaver; Coaches: 19 T. J. Burgmann (hitting); -- Josiah Hissong (development); -- Craig Prince (pitching); 60-day injured list: -- Garrett Apker; 90 Juan Bello; -- Wilton Lara (full season); 7-day injured list; * On Houston Astros 40-man roster; ~ Development list; # Rehab assignment; ∞ Reserve list; ‡ Restricted list; § Suspended list; † Temporarily inactive list; Roster updated May 19, 2026; Transactions; → More rosters: MiLB • South Atlantic League; → Houston Astros minor league players

=== Bowling Green Hot Rods ===
Bowling Green Hot Rods roster
Players	Coaches/Other
Pitchers: 2 Ryan Andrade; 35 Noah Beal; -- Jadon Bercovich; 16 Anderson Brito; 38 Cade Citelli; 12 Kaleb Corbett; 5 Garrett Gainey; 34 Andres Galan; 21 Trevor Harrison; 25 Jack Kartsonas; 39 Jacob Kisting; 32 Jacob Kmatz; 29 Andrew Lindsey; 28 Dominic Niman; 19 Andy Rodriguez; 9 Jonathan Russell; 13 Jose Urbina; 41 Austin Vernon #; 26 Junior William; Catchers: 20 Nathan Flewelling; Infielders: 22 Caden Bodine; 3 Ricardo Gonzalez; 31 Ryan McCoy; 1 Jose Perez; 7 Émilien Pitre; 6 Narciso Polanco; 8 Adrian Santana; Outfielders: 14 Theo Gillen; 11 Connor Hujsak; 23 Angel Mateo; 16 Aidan Smith; 17 Marshall Toole	Manager: 10 Rafael Valenzuela; Coaches: 41 Ryan Pennell (pitching); 4 Perry Roth (bench); 24 Brett Schneider (hitting); 60-day injured list: 40 Ryan Cermak; 33 Chandler Murphy; 7-day injured list; * On Tampa Bay Rays 40-man roster; ~ Development list; # Rehab assignment; ∞ Reserve list; ‡ Restricted list; § Suspended list; † Temporarily inactive list; Roster updated May 19, 2026; Transactions; → More rosters: MiLB • South Atlantic League; → Tampa Bay Rays minor league players

=== Greensboro Grasshoppers ===
Greensboro Grasshoppers roster
Players	Coaches/Other
Pitchers: 35 Jacob Bimbi; 48 Victor Cabreja; 45 Carlos Castillo; 28 Hung-Leng Chang; 44 Jose Garces; 12 Seth Hernandez; 32 Owen Kellington; 23 Cameron Keshock; 25 Kyle Larsen; 16 Inmer Lobo; 14 Bryan Mena; 17 Connor Oliver; 31 Adolfo Oviedo; 27 Treyson Peters; 26 Yulian Quintana; 29 Carlson Reed; 41 Alexis Torres; Catchers: 5 Easton Carmichael; 36 Camden Janik; 38 Axiel Plaz; Infielders: 7 Carlos Caro; 8 Yordany De Los Santos; 18 Murf Gray; 37 Jared Jones; 24 Wyatt Sanford; 34 Jhonny Severino; 10 Sammy Stafura; Outfielders: 47 Tony Blanco Jr.; 15 Edward Florentino; 2 Shalin Polanco; 22 Brian Sanchez	Manager: -- José Mosquera; Coaches: 50 Quentin Brown (hitting); 52 Rafael Chaves (pitching); 9 Pedro Florimón (development); 43 Jonathan Roof (hitting); 30 Phillip Wellman (bench); 60-day injured list: 46 Junior Flores (full season); -- Hunter Furtado; 7-day injured list; * On Pittsburgh Pirates 40-man roster; ~ Development list; # Rehab assignment; ∞ Reserve list; ‡ Restricted list; § Suspended list; † Temporarily inactive list; Roster updated May 19, 2026; Transactions; → More rosters: MiLB • South Atlantic League; → Pittsburgh Pirates minor league players

=== Greenville Drive ===
Greenville Drive roster
Players	Coaches/Other
Pitchers: 2 Osvaldo Berrios #; 39 Calvin Bickerstaff; 45 Alex Bouchard; 33 Steven Brooks; 30 Dylan Brown; 35 Austin Ehrlicher; 37 Devin Futrell; 28 Joey Gartrell; 55 Ben Hansen; 3 Jojo Ingrassia; 41 Danny Kirwin #; 22 P.J. Labriola; 38 Matt McShane; 22 Brandon Neely; 23 Marcus Phillips; 29 Shea Sprague; 26 Kyson Witherspoon; Catchers: 15 Adonys Guzman; 24 Ronny Hernandez; 19 Gerardo Rodriguez; 9 Hudson White; Infielders: 1 Antonio Anderson; 7 Yoeilin Cespedes; 6 Freili Encarnacion; 10 Henry Godbout; -- Maximus Martin; 5 Mason White; 12 Jack Winnay; 2 Nazzan Zanetello; Outfielders: 34 Justin Gonzales; 25 Isaiah Jackson; 18 Yophery Rodriguez; 20 Natanael Yuten	Manager: 4 Liam Carroll; Coaches: 14 Cody Gracco (assistant hitting); 13 Bob Kipper (pitching coach); 17 Jarrett Pico (hitting); 21 Andrew Sadoski (assistant pitching); 8 Ty Snep (coach); 60-day injured list: -- Zach Fogell; -- Isaac Stebens (full season); -- Brady Tygart; 30 Juan Valera (full season); 7-day injured list; * On Boston Red Sox 40-man roster; ~ Development list; # Rehab assignment; ∞ Reserve list; ‡ Restricted list; § Suspended list; † Temporarily inactive list; Roster updated May 19, 2026; Transactions; → More rosters: MiLB • South Atlantic League; → Boston Red Sox minor league players

=== Hub City Spartanburgers ===
Hub City Spartanburgers roster
Players	Coaches/Other
Pitchers: 15 Joe Adametz; 46 Ismael Agreda; 61 Joey Danielson; 24 J'Briell Easley; 17 Jesus Gamez; 18 Case Matter; 33 D. J. McCarty; 23 Kamdyn Perry; 11 Brock Porter; 25 Adrian Rodriguez; 43 Cole Roland; 12 Josh Sanders; 1 Luke Savage; -- Caden Scarborough; 37 Enrique Segura; 20 Cole Stasio; 13 Anthony Susac; 88 Kai Wynyard; Catchers: 4 Ben Hartl; 14 Malcolm Moore; Infielders: 8 Gleider Figuereo; 5 Carter Garate; 6 Luke Hanson; 47 Theo Hardy; 31 Rafe Perich; Outfielders: 35 Paxton Kling; 22 Antonis Macias; 27 Maxton Martin; 9 Yeison Morrobel; 2 Chandler Pollard; 19 Quincy Scott	Manager: 30 Carlos Maldonado; Coaches: 16 Jorge Cortes (development); 28 Landon Lassiter (development); 36 Mason Milkey (pitching); 00 Brian Pozos (hitting); 60-day injured list: -- Paul Bonzagni; -- Casey Cook; -- Kolton Curtis (full season); -- Brooks Fowler; -- Anthony Gutierrez (full season); -- Luis Ramirez; -- Izack Tiger; 7-day injured list; * On Texas Rangers 40-man roster; ~ Development list; # Rehab assignment; ∞ Reserve list; ‡ Restricted list; § Suspended list; † Temporarily inactive list; Roster updated May 26, 2026; Transactions; → More rosters: MiLB • South Atlantic League; → Texas Rangers minor league players

=== Rome Emperors ===
Rome Emperors roster
Players	Coaches/Other
Pitchers: 99 Trent Buchanan; 23 Cam Caminiti; 66 Drew Christo; 50 Mathieu Curtis; 45 Colin Daniel; 25 Cedric De Grandpre; 46 Riley Frey; 54 Isaac Gallegos; 59 Jacob Kroeger; 32 Cade Kuehler; 60 Justin Long; 61 Jeremy Reyes; 28 David Rodriguez; 51 Logan Samuels; 33 Luke Sinnard; 53 Connor Thomas #; Catchers: 34 Colin Burgess; 9 Mac Guscette; 24 Austin Machado; 12 Sean Murphy *#; Infielders: 7 John Gil; 22 Mason Guerra; 26 Colby Jones; 14 Cody Miller; 16 Will Verdung; 8 Dixon Williams; Outfielders: 19 Logan Braunschweig; 18 Owen Carey; 4 Isaiah Drake; 11 Eric Hartman; 20 Jake Steels	Manager: -- Wynston Sawyer; Coaches: 55 Philip Caulfield (coach); 15 Connor Justus (hitting); 1 Bobby Moore (coach); 40 Horacio Ramírez (pitching); 60-day injured list: 37 Cory Wall; 7-day injured list; * On Atlanta Braves 40-man roster; ~ Development list; # Rehab assignment; ∞ Reserve list; ‡ Restricted list; § Suspended list; † Temporarily inactive list; Roster updated May 19, 2026; Transactions; → More rosters: MiLB • South Atlantic League; → Atlanta Braves minor league players

=== Winston-Salem Dash ===
Winston-Salem Dash roster
Players	Coaches/Other
Pitchers: 46 Mason Adams; 31 Frankeli Arias; 17 Morris Austin; 25 Jake Bockenstedt; 14 Drew Conover; 6 Jake Curtis; 22 Gabe Davis; 25 Pierce George; 23 Madison Jeffrey; 11 Seth Keener; 12 Mathias LaCombe; 34 Aric McAtee; 32 Drew McDaniel; 33 Liam Paddack; 26 Jake Peppers; 23 David Sandlin * #; 27 Justin Sinibaldi; 44 Grant Umberger; 45 Garrett Wright; 16 Jack Young; Catchers: 20 Grant Magill; 15 Boston Smith; Infielders: 21 Caleb Bonemer; 1 Ryan Burrowes; 4 Bryce Eblin; 30 Arxy Hernandez; 2 Kyle Lodise; Outfielders: 3 Ely Brown; 13 T.J. McCants; 7 Alex Ungar; 19 George Wolkow	Manager: 24 Guillermo Quiroz; Coaches: 8 Tyler Coolbaugh (bench); 41 Jacob Dorris (pitching); -- Logan Jones (performance); 5 Adam Sinkoe (hitting); 60-day injured list: 4 Jackson Appel; -- Aldrin Batista; -- Clete Hartzog; -- Wes Kath; -- Eddie Park; 7-day injured list; * On Chicago White Sox 40-man roster; ~ Development list; # Rehab assignment; ∞ Reserve list; ‡ Restricted list; § Suspended list; † Temporarily inactive list; Roster updated May 23, 2026; Transactions; → More rosters: MiLB • South Atlantic League; → Chicago White Sox minor league players

== See also ==
- List of Midwest League team rosters
- List of Northwest League team rosters
