= Brody Hopkins =

American baseball player (born 2002)

Tampa Bay Rays – No. 88
- Pitcher
- Born: January 18, 2002 (age 24); Summerville, South Carolina, U.S.
- Bats: Right Throws: Right

MLB debut
- September 13, 2026, for the Tampa Bay Rays

MLB statistics (through 2026 season)
- Win–loss record: 0–0
- Earned run average: 5.06
- Strikeouts: 7
- Stats at Baseball Reference

Teams
- Tampa Bay Rays (2026–present)

William Brody Hopkins (born January 18, 2002) is an American professional baseball pitcher for the Tampa Bay Rays of Major League Baseball (MLB). He made his MLB debut in 2026.

== Amateur career ==
Hopkins played college baseball at the College of Charleston for two years before transferring to Winthrop University for one year.

== Professional career ==
Hopkins was selected by the Seattle Mariners in the sixth round of the 2023 Major League Baseball draft.

On July 25, 2024, the Mariners traded him to the Tampa Bay Rays along with Aidan Smith and Ty Cummings in exchange for Randy Arozarena.

Hopkins began the 2026 campaign with the Triple–A Durham Bulls, compiling a 4–8 record and 5.17 ERA with 122 strikeouts across 31 games (including 19 starts). On September 12, 2026, Hopkins was promoted to the major leagues for the first time.

== Personal life ==
His brother, TJ Hopkins, played in Major League Baseball for the Cincinnati Reds.
