= Charlee Soto =

American baseball player (born 2005)

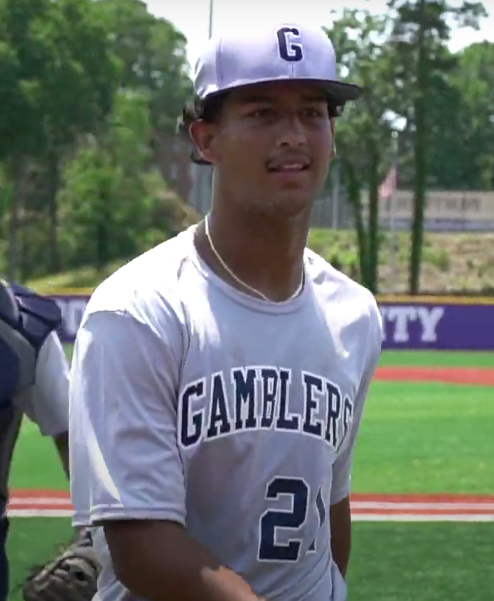
- Soto in 2022

Minnesota Twins
- Pitcher
- Born: August 31, 2005 (age 20); Philadelphia, Pennsylvania, U.S.
- Bats: Switch Throws: Right
- Stats at Baseball Reference

Charles Xavier Soto (born August 31, 2005) is an American professional baseball pitcher in the Minnesota Twins organization.

== Amateur career ==
Soto was born in Philadelphia, Pennsylvania and was raised in Kissimmee, Florida. He attended Reborn Christian Academy. Soto committed to play college baseball at the University of Central Florida.

== Professional career ==
The Minnesota Twins selected Soto in the first round, with the 34th overall selection, of the 2023 Major League Baseball draft. On July 21, 2023, Soto signed with the Twins for the full-slot value of $2,481,400.

Soto made his professional debut in 2024 with the Fort Myers Miracle, starting twenty games and going 1-7 with a 5.23 ERA and 87 strikeouts over 74 innings. He was named to Minnesota's Spring Breakout roster during 2025 spring training. To open the season, Soto was assigned to the Cedar Rapids Kernels. He made three starts before being placed on the injured list with a triceps strain.
