= Jared Simpson (baseball) =

American baseball player (born 2000)

Free agent
- Pitcher
- Born: June 28, 2000 (age 26); Clinton, Iowa, U.S.
- Bats: Left Throws: Left

MLB debut
- September 1, 2026, for the Washington Nationals

MLB statistics (through 2026 season)
- Win–loss record: 1–1
- Earned run average: 10.38
- Strikeouts: 4
- Stats at Baseball Reference

Teams
- Washington Nationals (2026)

Jared Tyler Simpson (born June 28, 2000) is an American professional baseball pitcher who is a free agent. He has previously played in Major League Baseball (MLB) for the Washington Nationals. He made his MLB debut in 2026.

== Amateur career ==
Simpson attended Clinton High School in Clinton, Iowa, and played college baseball at Iowa Western Community College, the University of Missouri, and the University of Iowa. As a senior at Iowa in 2023, he posted a 6.54 earned run average (ERA) with 64 strikeouts in 22 appearances.

== Professional career ==
Simpson was selected by the Washington Nationals in the eighth round, 225th overall, of the 2023 Major League Baseball draft. He made his professional debut that year with the Single-A Fredericksburg Nationals. In 2024, Simpson was placed on the 60-day injured list in March and missed most of the season. He returned in September and was assigned to the High-A Wilmington Blue Rocks, pitching in two games. Simpson returned to Wilmington in 2025, recording a 7.62 ERA with 64 strikeouts in 41 relief appearances.

Simpson began the 2026 season with the Double-A Harrisburg Senators and was later promoted to the Triple-A Rochester Red Wings. Between the two affiliates, he logged a 2.30 ERA with 73 strikeouts across 58 2/3 innings. On September 1, 2026, Simpson was selected to the 40–man roster and promoted to the major leagues for the first time. He made his major league debut later that day, pitching three scoreless innings in relief with three strikeouts and earning his first career win. On November 20, 2026, Simpson was non-tendered by the Nationals and became a free agent.
