= Brice Matthews =

American baseball player (born 2002)

Houston Astros – No. 0
- Outfielder / Second baseman
- Born: March 16, 2002 (age 24); Houston, Texas, U.S.
- Bats: Right Throws: Right

MLB debut
- July 11, 2025, for the Houston Astros

MLB statistics (through 2026 season)
- Batting average: .195
- Home runs: 11
- Runs batted in: 31
- Stats at Baseball Reference

Teams
- Houston Astros (2025–present)

Brice Andre Matthews (born March 16, 2002) is an American professional baseball outfielder and second baseman for the Houston Astros of Major League Baseball (MLB). He made his MLB debut in 2025.

== Amateur career ==
Matthews attended Atascocita High School in Humble, Texas. As a junior in 2019, he hit .426 with four home runs. He went unselected in the 2020 Major League Baseball draft, and enrolled at the University of Nebraska–Lincoln to play college baseball for the Nebraska Cornhuskers.

As a freshman at Nebraska in 2021, Matthews started 36 games and hit .273 with five home runs and 34 RBI. As a sophomore in 2022, he hit .261 with seven home runs and 29 RBI over 45 games. During the summers of 2021 and 2022, he played in the Northwoods League for the St. Cloud Rox. As a junior in 2023, Matthews hit .359 with twenty home runs and 67 RBI over 54 games.

== Professional career ==
The Houston Astros selected Matthews in the first round, with the 28th overall pick, in the 2023 Major League Baseball draft. On July 15, 2023, Matthews signed with the Astros for $2.4 million.

Matthews made his professional debut with the Florida Complex League Astros and, after two games, was then assigned to the Fayetteville Woodpeckers. Over 35 games between the two teams, Matthew hit .208 with four home runs and 11 RBI. Matthews was assigned to the Asheville Tourists to begin 2024 and was promoted to the Corpus Christi Hooks and Sugar Land Space Cowboys during the season. He missed time during the season due to back spasms. In total for the 2024 season, Matthews played in 79 games, batting .265 with 15 home runs, 44 RBI, and 32 stolen bases.

The Astros assigned Matthews to Sugar Land to open the 2025 season. He appeared in a total of 112 games for the team and hit .260 with 17 home runs, 64 RBI, and 41 stolen bases. On May 10, he hit for the cycle, the first of his career in professional baseball. He led a 12–7 win over the Salt Lake Bees and the cycle was the second in Space Cowboys franchise history. He was selected to represent the Astros (alongside Alimber Santa) at the 2025 All-Star Futures Game at Truist Park.

On July 11, 2025, the Astros selected Matthews' contract and promoted him to the major leagues for the first time. At the time of his promotion, he was batting .283 with ten home runs, 39 RBI, and 25 stolen bases over 73 games with Sugar Land. Matthews made his MLB debut that night as the club's starting second baseman versus the Texas Rangers at Daikin Park; he went 0-for-4 with three strikeouts. Matthews hit his first two major league home runs on July 21 against Zac Gallen and the Arizona Diamondbacks. On August 1, the Astros optioned Matthews to Sugar Land. He made 42 at-bat's for the Astros during the season and hit .167 with four home runs and nine RBI.

Matthews was named to Houston's Opening Day roster in 2026. On May 6, he hit his first career leadoff home run, off Tyler Glasnow of the Los Angeles Dodgers. On July 17, Matthews was placed on the 10-day injured list with a left knee sprain. He was subsequently transferred to the 60-day injured list on August 19. Matthews was activated and returned to play on September 19, but was then placed back on the injured list with left knee inflammation four days later, ending his 2026 season early. Across 84 games played for the Astros, he batted .201 with seven home runs and 22 RBI.
