= Jaxon Wiggins =

American baseball player (born 2001)

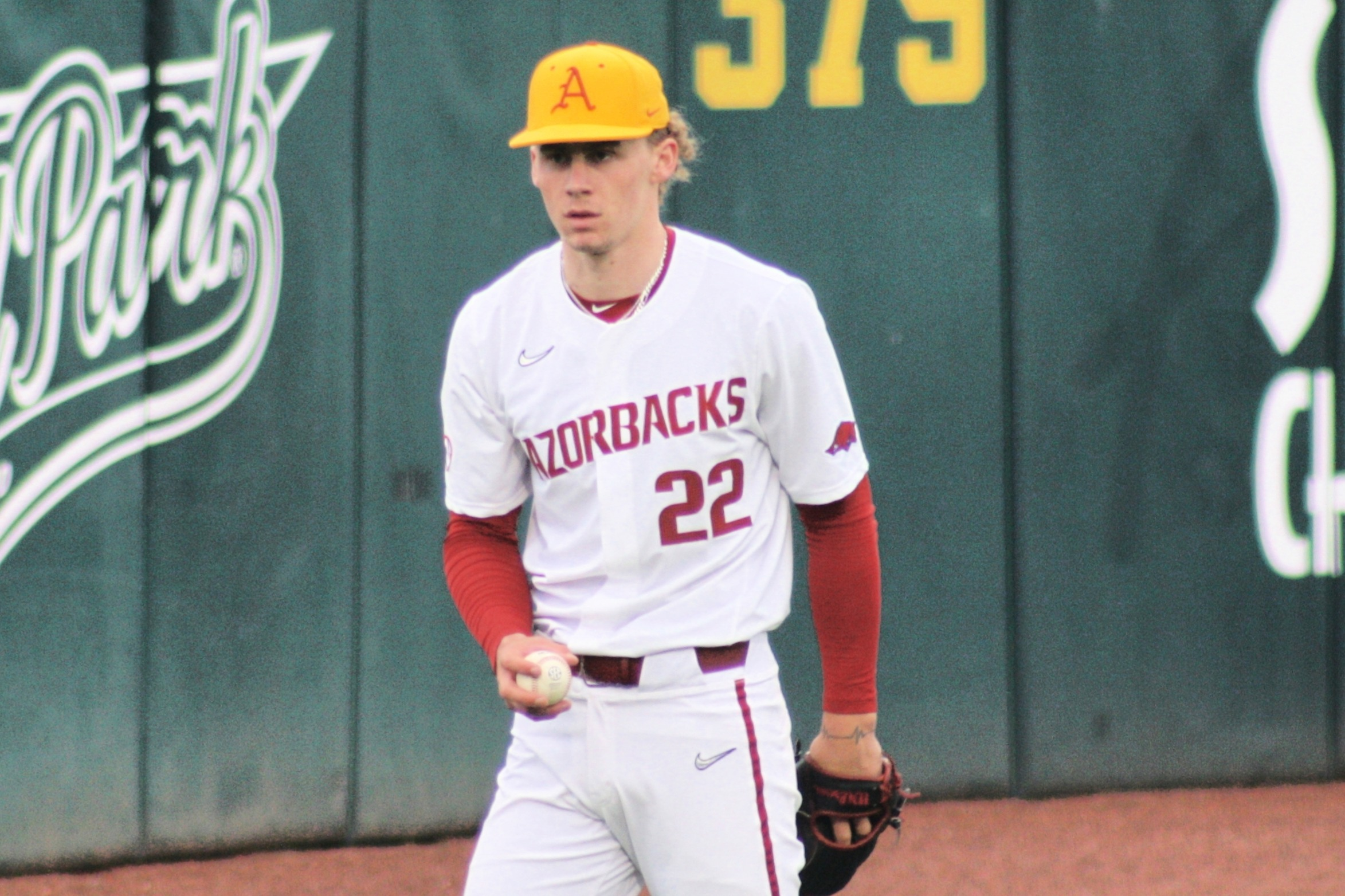
- Wiggins with the Arkansas Razorbacks

Chicago Cubs
- Pitcher
- Born: October 3, 2001 (age 25); Roland, Oklahoma, U.S.
- Bats: Right Throws: Right
- Stats at Baseball Reference

Jaxon Lee Wiggins (born October 3, 2001) is an American professional baseball pitcher for the Chicago Cubs of Major League Baseball (MLB).

== Amateur career ==
Wiggins attended Roland High School and played college baseball at the University of Arkansas for the Razorbacks. In Wiggins' freshman season, he finished with a 3–1 record, a 5.09 ERA, four saves, and 28 strikeouts over 23 innings. In Wiggins' sophomore season, he finished with a 6.55 ERA in 66 innings, having a 6–3 record, while striking out 82 batters. He missed the entire 2023 season after undergoing Tommy John surgery on his right elbow.

== Professional career ==
Wiggins was selected by the Chicago Cubs in the second round, with the 68th overall selection, of the 2023 Major League Baseball draft. On July 25, 2023, Wiggins signed with the Cubs for an over-slot deal worth $1.4 million.

Wiggins made his professional debut in 2024 with the Rookie-level Arizona Complex League Cubs and also played with the Single-A Myrtle Beach Pelicans and High-A South Bend Cubs. Across 18 starts, he had 3–6 record, a 4.37 ERA, and 71 strikeouts across 59 2/3 innings pitched. Wiggins opened 2025 with South Bend and was promoted to the Double-A Knoxville Smokies and Triple-A Iowa Cubs during the season. He appeared in 19 games (18 starts) between the three clubs and ended the season with a 3–4 record, a 2.19 ERA, and 97 strikeouts across 78 innings.

Wiggins was assigned back to Iowa to start the 2026 season, but missed time due to right elbow inflammation. He completed rehab assignments with the ACL Cubs and South Bend and then returned to Iowa as a relief pitcher. Over 18 games (seven starts) with Iowa, Wiggins had a 0–3 record, a 7.83 ERA, and 41 strikeouts over 33 1/3 innings.

== Personal life ==
Wiggins' younger brother, Carson Wiggins, was selected by the New York Mets in the first round of the 2026 Major League Baseball draft.
