= Marty Malloy =

American baseball player (born 1972)

- Second baseman
- Born: July 6, 1972 (age 54); Gainesville, Florida, U.S.
- Batted: Left Threw: Right

MLB debut
- September 6, 1998, for the Atlanta Braves

Last MLB appearance
- June 7, 2002, for the Florida Marlins

MLB statistics
- Batting average: .151
- Home runs: 1
- Runs batted in: 2
- Stats at Baseball Reference

Teams
- Atlanta Braves (1998); Florida Marlins (2002)
Medals
Men's baseball
Representing United States
Baseball World Cup
Silver medal – second place	2001 Taipei	National team

Marty Thomas Malloy (born July 6, 1972) is an American former Major League Baseball second baseman who played two seasons, and current manager of the Clearwater Threshers. He played with the Atlanta Braves for 11 games during the 1998 season, and the Florida Marlins for 24 games during the 2002 season.

Malloy was the subject of Paul Hemphill's 1996 book Heart of the Game: The Education of a Minor-League Ball Player. Hemphill followed Malloy's struggles to make the major leagues as he played for the Durham Bulls.

From 2014 to 2016, Malloy managed the Gulf Coast Astros of the Gulf Coast League. Malloy managed the Lakewood BlueClaws of the South Atlantic League from 2017 to 2018 before taking the reins of the Clearwater Threshers in 2019.

Malloy was named Minor League Field Director in 2021 before taking over as manager of the Clearwater Threshers when Milver Reyes was fired.

In January 2026, Malloy was named as bench coach of the Reading Fightin Phils the Double-A affiliate of the Philadelphia Phillies for the 2026 season.
