= Ben Simon (baseball) =

American baseball player (born 2002)

New York Mets
- Pitcher
- Born: March 22, 2002 (age 24); Princeton, New Jersey, U.S.
- Bats: Right Throws: Right

Benjamin Ross Simon (born March 22, 2002) is an American professional baseball pitcher in the New York Mets organization.

== Amateur career ==
Simon attended Hightstown High School in Hightstown, New Jersey and played three years of college baseball at Elon University. As a junior in 2023, he made 21 relief appearances and had a 1–3 record, a 3.20 ERA, and 32 strikeouts across 25 1/3 innings.

== Professional career ==
Simon was selected by the New York Mets in the 13th round of the 2023 Major League Baseball draft.

Simon made his professional debut with the Florida Complex League Mets before he was promoted to the St. Lucie Mets; across six relief appearances with both teams, he had a 7.11 ERA. In 2024, he played with the Brooklyn Cyclones and went 2–3 with a 4.04 ERA across 22 games. Simon split the 2025 season between Brooklyn and the Binghamton Rumble Ponies and had a 5–1 record and 2.98 ERA across 38 relief appearances between both teams, including a 1.06 ERA across 17 innings with Binghamton. Simon was a non-roster invitee to 2026 spring training and was named to the Mets Spring Breakout roster. He opened the 2026 season with Binghamton and was promoted to the Syracuse Mets in May. Across 47 games between the two teams, Simon went 6–6 with a 3.56 ERA.

== International career ==
Simon played for the Israel national baseball team in the 2026 World Baseball Classic.
