= 2023 Major League Baseball draft =

Major League Baseball draft

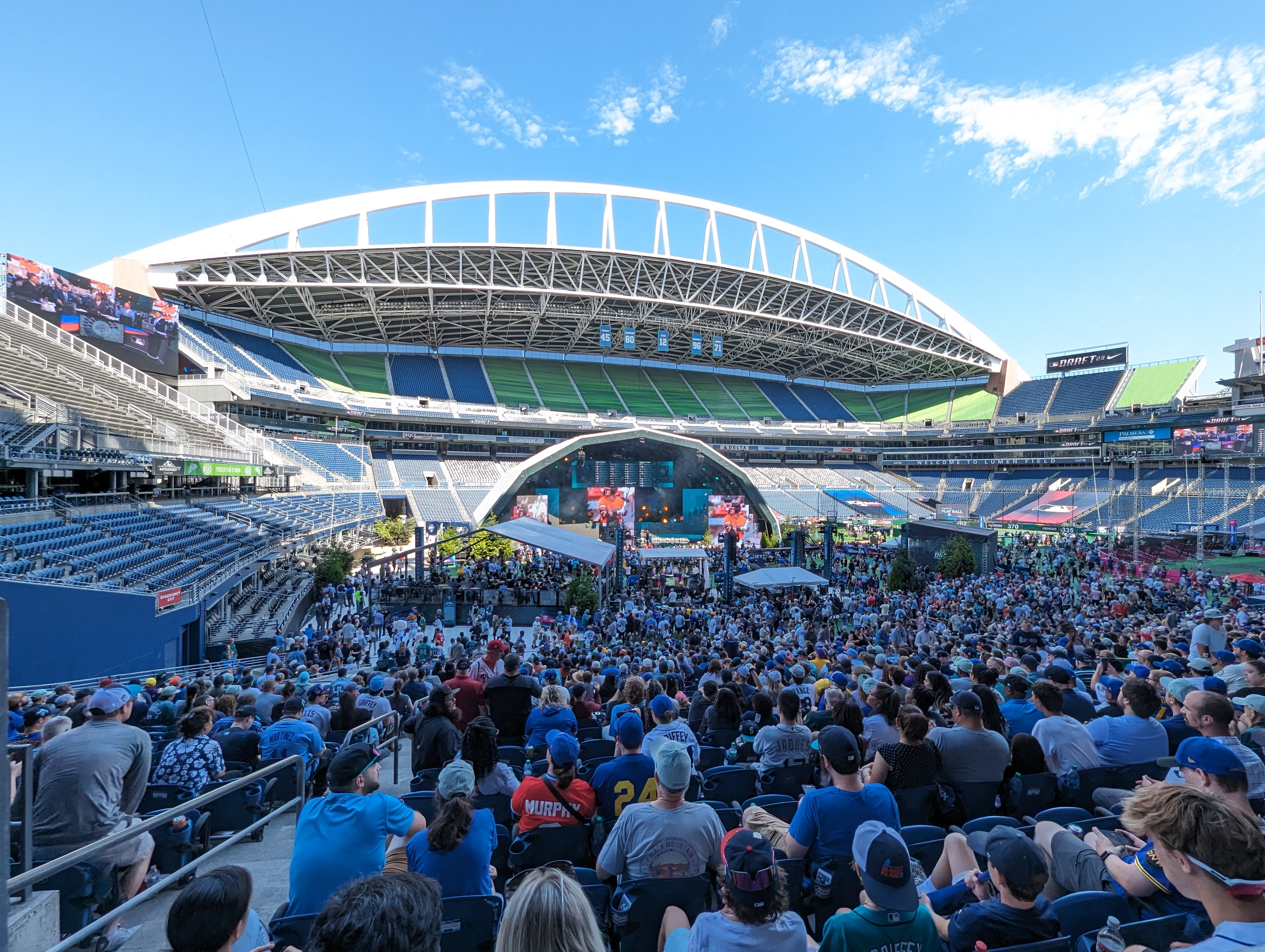
- The draft stage at Lumen Field

General information
- Date: July 9–11, 2023
- Location: Lumen Field; Seattle, Washington
- Networks: MLB Network; ESPN (first round)

Overview
- 614 total selections in 20 rounds
- First selection: Paul Skenes; Pittsburgh Pirates
- First round selections: 39

The 2023 Major League Baseball draft took place on July 9–11, 2023, in Seattle. The draft assigned amateur baseball players to MLB teams. For the first time, a draft lottery was used to set a portion of the draft order. The first six selections were set via the lottery, with picks belonging to the remaining lottery participants set in reverse order of regular season winning percentage. To complete the first round, playoff teams selected in an order that combined postseason finish, revenue sharing status, and reverse order of winning percentage. Reverse order of regular season winning percentage and postseason finish was used to set the draft order for rounds two through 20. In addition, compensation picks were distributed for players who did not sign from the 2022 MLB draft.

The Pittsburgh Pirates won the inaugural MLB Draft Lottery, and selected Paul Skenes with the first pick in the draft. The first round picks of the New York Mets and Los Angeles Dodgers were moved down 10 slots as a result of those teams exceeding the first luxury tax threshold by $40 million or more. The Seattle Mariners were awarded the first Prospect Promotion Incentive Pick, the 29th overall pick, after Julio Rodríguez won the 2022 American League Rookie of the Year Award.

The first and second rounds of the draft were held at Lumen Field, a football and soccer stadium adjacent to T-Mobile Park, where the 2023 All-Star Game took place.

Nolan Schanuel made his MLB debut for the Los Angeles Angels on August 18, 2023, making him the first player from the 2023 draft to make his major league debut. Schanuel became the first player to debut in the major leagues in the same year of his draft since Garrett Crochet in 2020.

== Draft lottery ==
The draft lottery for the 2023 MLB Draft took place on December 6, 2022, in San Diego.

The following table lists the percentage chances for each team to receive specific picks as a result of the draft lottery.

Denotes lottery winner
Denotes team that did not win lottery

Seed	Team	1st	2nd	3rd	4th	5th	6th
1	Washington Nationals	16.5%	15.6%	14.5%	13.2%	11.6%	9.7%
2	Oakland Athletics	16.5%	15.6%	14.5%	13.2%	11.6%	9.7%
3	Pittsburgh Pirates	16.5%	15.6%	14.5%	13.2%	11.6%	9.7%
4	Cincinnati Reds	13.2%	13.1%	12.9%	12.4%	11.7%	10.6%
5	Kansas City Royals	10.0%	10.3%	10.6%	10.9%	11.1%	11.0%
6	Detroit Tigers	7.5%	8.0%	8.5%	9.1%	9.8%	10.4%
7	Texas Rangers	5.5%	6.0%	6.5%	7.2%	8.0%	9.1%
8	Colorado Rockies	3.9%	4.3%	4.8%	5.4%	6.2%	7.3%
9	Miami Marlins	2.7%	3.0%	3.4%	3.9%	4.6%	5.5%
10	Los Angeles Angels	1.8%	2.0%	2.3%	2.7%	3.2%	3.9%
11	Arizona Diamondbacks	1.4%	1.6%	1.8%	2.1%	2.5%	3.1%
12	Chicago Cubs	1.1%	1.2%	1.4%	1.7%	2.0%	2.5%
13	Minnesota Twins	0.9%	1.0%	1.2%	1.4%	1.7%	2.0%
14	Boston Red Sox	0.8%	0.9%	1.0%	1.2%	1.4%	1.7%
15	Chicago White Sox	0.6%	0.7%	0.8%	1.0%	1.2%	1.4%
16	San Francisco Giants	0.5%	0.5%	0.6%	0.7%	0.9%	1.1%
17	Baltimore Orioles	0.4%	0.4%	0.5%	0.6%	0.7%	0.8%
18	Milwaukee Brewers	0.2%	0.3%	0.3%	0.4%	0.4%	0.5%

== Draft selections ==
Key
	All-Star
*	Player did not sign

=== First round ===
Pick	Player	Team	Position	School
1	Paul Skenes	Pittsburgh Pirates	Pitcher	LSU
2	Dylan Crews	Washington Nationals	Outfielder	LSU
3	Max Clark	Detroit Tigers	Outfielder	Franklin Community High School (IN)
4	Wyatt Langford	Texas Rangers	Outfielder	Florida
5	Walker Jenkins	Minnesota Twins	Outfielder	South Brunswick High School (NC)
6	Jacob Wilson	Oakland Athletics	Shortstop	Grand Canyon
7	Rhett Lowder	Cincinnati Reds	Pitcher	Wake Forest
8	Blake Mitchell	Kansas City Royals	Catcher	Sinton High School (TX)
9	Chase Dollander	Colorado Rockies	Pitcher	Tennessee
10	Noble Meyer	Miami Marlins	Pitcher	Jesuit High School (OR)
11	Nolan Schanuel	Los Angeles Angels	First baseman	Florida Atlantic
12	Tommy Troy	Arizona Diamondbacks	Shortstop	Stanford
13	Matt Shaw	Chicago Cubs	Shortstop	Maryland
14	Kyle Teel	Boston Red Sox	Catcher	Virginia
15	Jacob Gonzalez	Chicago White Sox	Shortstop	Ole Miss
16	Bryce Eldridge	San Francisco Giants	Two-way player	James Madison High School (VA)
17	Enrique Bradfield	Baltimore Orioles	Outfielder	Vanderbilt
18	Brock Wilken	Milwaukee Brewers	Third baseman	Wake Forest
19	Brayden Taylor	Tampa Bay Rays	Shortstop	TCU
20	Arjun Nimmala	Toronto Blue Jays	Shortstop	Strawberry Crest High School (FL)
21	Chase Davis	St. Louis Cardinals	Outfielder	Arizona
22	Colt Emerson	Seattle Mariners	Shortstop	John Glenn High School (OH)
23	Ralphy Velazquez	Cleveland Guardians	Catcher	Huntington Beach High School (CA)
24	Hurston Waldrep	Atlanta Braves	Pitcher	Florida
25	Dillon Head	San Diego Padres	Outfielder	Homewood-Flossmoor High School (IL)
26	George Lombard Jr.	New York Yankees	Shortstop	Gulliver Preparatory School (FL)
27	Aidan Miller	Philadelphia Phillies	Shortstop	J. W. Mitchell High School (FL)
28	Brice Matthews	Houston Astros	Shortstop	Nebraska

=== Prospect promotion incentive pick ===
Pick	Player	Team	Position	School
29	Jonny Farmelo	Seattle Mariners (Note: Received for Julio Rodriguez winning the 2022 American League Rookie of the Year Award)	Outfielder	Westfield High School (VA)

=== Competitive balance round A ===
Pick	Player	Team	Position	School
30	Tai Peete	Seattle Mariners	Shortstop	Trinity Christian School (GA)
31	Adrian Santana	Tampa Bay Rays	Shortstop	Doral Academy Preparatory School (FL)
32	Colin Houck	New York Mets	Shortstop	Parkview High School (GA)
33	Josh Knoth	Milwaukee Brewers	Pitcher	Patchogue-Medford High School (NY)
34	Charlee Soto	Minnesota Twins	Pitcher	Reborn Christian Academy (FL)
35	Thomas White	Miami Marlins	Pitcher	Phillips Academy (MA)
36	Kendall George	Los Angeles Dodgers	Outfielder	Atascocita High School (TX)
37	Kevin McGonigle	Detroit Tigers	Shortstop	Bonner & Prendergast Catholic High School (PA)
38	Ty Floyd	Cincinnati Reds	Pitcher	LSU
39	Myles Naylor	Oakland Athletics	Third baseman	St. Joan of Arc Catholic Secondary School (ON)

=== Second round ===
Pick	Player	Team	Position	School
40	Yohandy Morales	Washington Nationals	Third baseman	Miami (FL)
41	Ryan Lasko	Oakland Athletics	Outfielder	Rutgers
42	Mitch Jebb	Pittsburgh Pirates	Shortstop	Michigan State
43	Sammy Stafura	Cincinnati Reds	Shortstop	Walter Panas High School (NY)
44	Blake Wolters	Kansas City Royals	Pitcher	Mahomet-Seymour High School (IL)
45	Max Anderson	Detroit Tigers	Second baseman	Nebraska
46	Sean Sullivan	Colorado Rockies	Pitcher	Wake Forest
47	Kemp Alderman	Miami Marlins	Outfielder	Ole Miss
48	Gino Groover	Arizona Diamondbacks	Third baseman	NC State
49	Luke Keaschall	Minnesota Twins	Second baseman	Arizona State
50	Nazzan Zanetello	Boston Red Sox	Shortstop	Christian Brothers College High School (MO)
51	Grant Taylor	Chicago White Sox	Pitcher	LSU
52	Walker Martin	San Francisco Giants	Shortstop	Eaton High School (CO)
53	Mac Horvath	Baltimore Orioles	Outfielder	North Carolina
54	Mike Boeve	Milwaukee Brewers	Third baseman	Omaha
55	Colton Ledbetter	Tampa Bay Rays	Outfielder	Mississippi State
56	Brandon Sproat	New York Mets	Pitcher	Florida
57	Ben Williamson	Seattle Mariners	Third baseman	William & Mary
58	Alex Clemmey	Cleveland Guardians	Pitcher	Bishop Hendricken High School (RI)
59	Drue Hackenberg	Atlanta Braves	Pitcher	Virginia Tech
60	Jake Gelof	Los Angeles Dodgers	Third baseman	Virginia
61	Alonzo Tredwell	Houston Astros	Pitcher	UCLA

=== Competitive balance round B ===
Pick	Player	Team	Position	School
62	Andrew Walters	Cleveland Guardians	Pitcher	Miami (FL)
63	Jackson Baumeister	Baltimore Orioles	Pitcher	Florida State
64	Caden Grice	Arizona Diamondbacks	Pitcher	Clemson
65	Cole Carrigg	Colorado Rockies	Catcher	San Diego State
66	Carson Roccaforte	Kansas City Royals	Outfielder	Louisiana
67	Zander Mueth	Pittsburgh Pirates	Pitcher	Belleville High School-East (IL)

=== Compensatory round ===
Pick	Player	Team	Position	School
68	Jaxon Wiggins	Chicago Cubs (Note: Compensation pick for the St. Louis Cardinals signing Willson Contreras)	Pitcher	Arkansas
69	Joe Whitman	San Francisco Giants (Note: Compensation pick for the New York Yankees signing Carlos Rodón)	Pitcher	Kent State
70	Cade Kuehler	Atlanta Braves (Note: Compensation pick for the Chicago Cubs signing Dansby Swanson)	Pitcher	Campbell

=== Other notable selections ===
Round	Pick	Player	Team	Position	School
3	71	Travis Sykora	Washington Nationals	Pitcher	Round Rock High School (TX)
3	78	Brock Vradenburg	Miami Marlins	First baseman	Michigan State
3	79	Alberto Rios	Los Angeles Angels	Outfielder	Stanford
3	80	Jack Hurley	Arizona Diamondbacks	Outfielder	Virginia Tech
3	81	Josh Rivera	Chicago Cubs	Shortstop	Florida
3	82	Brandon Winokur	Minnesota Twins	Outfielder	Edison High School (CA)
3	88	Tre' Morgan	Tampa Bay Rays	First baseman	LSU
3	89	Juaron Watts-Brown	Toronto Blue Jays	Pitcher	Oklahoma State
3	91	Nolan McLean	New York Mets	Two-way player	Oklahoma State
3	93	C. J. Kayfus	Cleveland Guardians	Two-way player	Miami (FL)
3	97	Kyle Carr	New York Yankees	Pitcher	Palomar College
3	99	Jake Bloss	Houston Astros	Pitcher	Georgetown
3	101	Kade Morris	New York Mets	Pitcher	Nevada
4	102	Andrew Pinckney	Washington Nationals	Outfielder	Alabama
4	104	Carlson Reed	Pittsburgh Pirates	Pitcher	West Virginia
4	106	Hunter Owen	Kansas City Royals	Pitcher	Vanderbilt
4	108	Skylar Hales	Texas Rangers	Pitcher	Santa Clara
4	110	Emmett Olson	Miami Marlins	Pitcher	Nebraska
4	114	Tanner Hall	Minnesota Twins	Pitcher	Southern Miss
4	117	Maui Ahuna	San Francisco Giants	Shortstop	Tennessee
4	122	Quinn Mathews	St. Louis Cardinals	Pitcher	Stanford
4	124	Aidan Smith	Seattle Mariners	Outfielder	Lovejoy High School (TX)
4	125	Cooper Ingle	Cleveland Guardians	Catcher	Clemson
4	126	Garrett Baumann	Atlanta Braves	Pitcher	Paul J. Hagerty High School (FL)
4	128	Homer Bush Jr.	San Diego Padres	Outfielder	Grand Canyon
4	129	Roc Riggio	New York Yankees	Second baseman	Oklahoma State
4	132	Kristian Campbell	Boston Red Sox	Shortstop	Georgia Tech
4	134	A. J. Ewing	New York Mets (Note: Compensation pick for the Texas Rangers signing Jacob deGrom)	Shortstop	Springboro High School (OH)
4	136	Dylan Campbell	Los Angeles Dodgers	Outfielder	Texas
5	140	Patrick Reilly	Pittsburgh Pirates	Pitcher	Vanderbilt
5	143	Jaden Hamm	Detroit Tigers	Pitcher	Middle Tennessee
5	145	Kyle Karros	Colorado Rockies	Third baseman	UCLA
5	151	Connelly Early	Boston Red Sox	Pitcher	Virginia
5	156	Trevor Harrison	Tampa Bay Rays	Pitcher	J. W. Mitchell High School (FL)
5	159	Zac Thornton	New York Mets	Pitcher	Grand Canyon
5	160	Brock Rodden	Seattle Mariners	Second Baseman	Wichita State
5	162	Isaiah Drake	Atlanta Braves	Outfielder	North Atlanta High School (GA)
6	174	Camden Minacci	Los Angeles Angels	Pitcher	Wake Forest
6	175	Philip Abner	Arizona Diamondbacks	Pitcher	Florida
6	182	Cooper Pratt	Milwaukee Brewers	Shortstop	Magnolia Heights School (MS)
6	183	TJ Nichols	Tampa Bay Rays	Pitcher	Arizona
6	186	Jack Wenninger	New York Mets	Pitcher	Illinois
6	187	Brody Hopkins	Seattle Mariners	Pitcher	Winthrop
6	189	Lucas Braun	Atlanta Braves	Pitcher	Cal State Northridge
6	193	George Klassen	Philadelphia Phillies	Pitcher	Minnesota
6	194	Ethan Pecko	Houston Astros	Pitcher	Towson
7	196	Nate Nankil	Oakland Athletics	Outfielder	Cal State Fullerton
7	197	Jaden Woods	Pittsburgh Pirates	Pitcher	Georgia
7	202	Seth Halvorsen	Colorado Rockies	Pitcher	Tennessee
7	209	George Wolkow	Chicago White Sox	Outfielder	Downers Grove North High School (IL)
7	210	Scott Bandura	San Francisco Giants	Outfielder	Princeton
7	213	Owen Wild	Tampa Bay Rays	Pitcher	Gonzaga
7	217	Ty Cummings	Seattle Mariners	Pitcher	Campbell
7	221	Tucker Musgrove	San Diego Padres	Pitcher	Mobile
8	225	Jared Simpson	Washington Nationals	Pitcher	Iowa
8	228	Carter Graham	Cincinnati Reds	First baseman	Stanford
8	234	Barrett Kent	Los Angeles Angels	Pitcher	Pottsboro High School (TX)
8	236	Brett Bateman	Chicago Cubs	Outfielder	Minnesota
8	241	Braxton Bragg	Baltimore Orioles	Pitcher	Dallas Baptist
8	242	Craig Yoho	Milwaukee Brewers	Pitcher	Indiana
8	249	Cory Wall	Atlanta Braves	Pitcher	William & Mary
9	265	Kyle Amendt	Arizona Diamondbacks	Pitcher	Dallas Baptist
9	266	Jonathon Long	Chicago Cubs	Third baseman	Long Beach State
9	267	Jack Dougherty	Minnesota Twins	Pitcher	Ole Miss
9	271	Zach Fruit	Baltimore Orioles	Pitcher	Troy
9	272	Mark Manfredi	Milwaukee Brewers	Pitcher	Dayton
9	277	RJ Schreck	Seattle Mariners	Outfielder	Vanderbilt
9	279	Riley Gowens	Atlanta Braves	Pitcher	Illinois
10	285	Phillip Glasser	Washington Nationals	Shortstop	Indiana
10	290	Andrew Sears	Detroit Tigers	Pitcher	UConn
10	301	Matthew Etzel	Baltimore Orioles	Outfielder	Southern Miss
10	307	Jared Sundstrom	Seattle Mariners	Outfielder	UC Santa Barbara
10	308	Matt Wilkinson	Cleveland Guardians	Pitcher	Central Arizona College
11	320	Jim Jarvis	Detroit Tigers	Shortstop	Alabama
11	326	Zyhir Hope	Chicago Cubs	Outfielder	Colonial Forge High School (VA)
11	329	Rikuu Nishida	Chicago White Sox	Outfielder	Oregon
11	337	Brandyn Garcia	Seattle Mariners	Pitcher	Texas A&M
12	347	Khristian Curtis	Pittsburgh Pirates	Pitcher	Arizona State
12	353	Josh Ekness	Miami Marlins	Pitcher	Houston
12	367	Logan Evans	Seattle Mariners	Pitcher	Pittsburgh
13	377	Charles McAdoo	Pittsburgh Pirates	Second baseman	San Jose State
13	380	Brett Callahan	Detroit Tigers	Outfielder	Saint Joseph's
13	392	Brett Wichrowski	Milwaukee Brewers	Pitcher	Bryant
13	396	Ben Simon	New York Mets	Pitcher	Elon
13	398	Jacob Bresnahan	Cleveland Guardians	Pitcher	Sumner High School (WA)
14	421	Michael Forret	Baltimore Orioles	Pitcher	State College of Florida, Manatee–Sarasota
14	425	Jacob Odle	St. Louis Cardinals	Pitcher	Orange Coast College
14	429	Mitch Farris	Atlanta Braves	Pitcher	Wingate University
14	434	Jackson Nezuh	Houston Astros	Pitcher	Louisiana
15	446	Ty Johnson	Chicago Cubs	Pitcher	Ball State
16	471	Jake Brown*	Texas Rangers	Outfielder	Sulphur High School (LA)
17	510	Drew Cavanaugh	San Francisco Giants	Catcher	Florida Southern
18	541	Tanner Witt*	Baltimore Orioles	Pitcher	Texas
19	558	Herick Hernandez*	Cincinnati Reds	Pitcher	Miami Dade College
19	564	Raudi Rodriguez	Los Angeles Angels	Outfielder	Georgia Premier Academy (GA)
19	576	Christian Little*	New York Mets	Pitcher	LSU
20	610	DJ Uiagalelei*	Los Angeles Dodgers	Two-way player	Oregon State

== Notes ==
Incentive picks

Compensation picks
