= Colin Houck =

American baseball player (born 2004)

New York Mets
- Shortstop
- Born: September 30, 2004 (age 22); Stockbridge, Georgia, U.S.
- Bats: Right Throws: Right

Colin Davis Houck (born September 30, 2004) is an American professional baseball shortstop in the New York Mets organization.

== Amateur career ==
Houck grew up in Lilburn, Georgia, and attended Parkview High School, where he was a member of the baseball and football teams. As a quarterback, he passed for 2,142 yards and 19 touchdowns during his junior football season. He was ranked a 3 star quarterback by Rivals, 247, and On3. Houck batted .412 with 15 home runs, 44 RBIs, 43 runs scored, and nine stolen bases during his junior season. Houck passed for 2,189 yards and 24 touchdowns and set Parkview's school record for career passing yards during his senior season. He was named a preseason All-American entering his senior baseball season. Houck batted .487 with eight home runs, 50 RBIs, 56 runs scored, and 16 stolen bases as a senior and was named the Georgia Gatorade Baseball Player of the Year. Houck had committed to play college baseball at Mississippi State prior to signing with the Mets. He had also been recruited by Georgia Tech to play football.

== Professional career ==
Houck was selected by the New York Mets with the 32nd overall pick in the 2023 Major League Baseball draft. He signed with the team on July 14, 2023, and received an over-slot signing bonus of $2.75 million.

Houck made his professional debut after signing with the Florida Complex League Mets, hitting .241 over nine games. In 2024, he played with the St. Lucie Mets with whom he batted .206 with five home runs and 51 RBIs over 112 games. Houck was assigned back to St. Lucie to open the 2025 season and promoted to the Brooklyn Cyclones in June. Over 116 games, he hit .228 with 10 home runs and 53 RBIs. Houck returned to Brooklyn for the 2026 season and batted .212 with nine home runs and 40 RBIs across 99 games.
