= Brock Vradenburg =

American baseball player (born 2002)

Glacier Range Riders
- First baseman
- Born: March 20, 2002 (age 24); Pasadena, California, U.S.
- Bats: Left Throws: Right

Brock Comegys Vradenburg (born March 20, 2002) is an American professional baseball first baseman for the Glacier Range Riders of the Pioneer Baseball League.

== Amateur career ==
Vradenburg attended Maranatha High School in Pasadena, California and played college baseball for the Michigan State Spartans. He was named first-team All-Big Ten Conference as a junior after batting .400 with 13 home runs and 69 RBI. Vradenburg played summer collegiate baseball for the Lexington County Blowfish of the Coastal Plain League in 2021 and 2022.

== Professional career ==
=== Miami Marlins ===
The Miami Marlins selected Vradenburg in the third round (78th overall) of the 2023 Major League Baseball draft. After signing with the team, he was assigned to the Jupiter Hammerheads of the Single-A Florida State League, where he slashed .236/.368/.291 with one home run, 10 RBI, and three stolen bases. Vradenburg split 2024 between Jupiter and the High-A Beloit Sky Carp, batting a combined .206/.327/.329 with 10 home runs, 64 RBI, and 20 stolen bases across 125 appearances.

Vradenburg made 66 appearances for High-A Beloit, slashing .172/.290/.279 with two home runs, 22 RBI, and 12 stolen bases. Vradenburg was released by the Marlins organization on August 4, 2025.

=== Philadelphia Phillies ===
On August 6, 2025, Vradenburg signed a minor league contract with the Philadelphia Phillies organization. He made 15 appearances down the stretch for the High-A Jersey Shore BlueClaws, batting .205/.390/.318 with one home run, four RBI, and one stolen base.

Vradenburg returned to Jersey Shore to begin the 2026 campaign, slashing .142/.258/.213 with one home run, 14 RBI, and three stolen bases. Vradenburg was released by the Phillies organization on June 17, 2026.

=== Glacier Range Riders ===
On June 27, 2026, Vradenburg signed with the Glacier Range Riders of the Pioneer Baseball League.
