= Arizona Diamondbacks minor league players =

Below is a partial list of minor league baseball players of the minor league affiliates of the Arizona Diamondbacks:

== Players ==
=== Kyle Amendt ===
Kyle Amendt

Arizona Diamondbacks
- Pitcher
- Born: April 5, 2000 (age 26); Pleasantville, Iowa, U.S.
- Bats: Right Throws: Right

Kyle Richard Amendt (born April 5, 2000) is an American professional baseball pitcher in the Arizona Diamondbacks organization.

Amendt played college baseball at the Southeastern Community College and Dallas Baptist University. He was selected by the Arizona Diamondbacks in the ninth round of the 2023 Major League Baseball draft.

Amendt signed with the Diamondbacks and spent his first season with the Arizona Complex League Diamondbacks and Visalia Rawhide. He started 2024 with the Hillsboro Hops before being promoted to the Amarillo Sod Poodles.

- Career statistics from Baseball Reference (Minors)
- Southeastern CC Blackhawks bio
- Dallas Baptist Patriots bio

=== Wellington Aracena ===
Wellington Aracena

Arizona Diamondbacks
- Pitcher
- Born: December 28, 2004 (age 21); Mao, Dominican Republic
- Bats: Right Throws: Right

Wellington Rafael Aracena (born December 27, 2004) is a Dominican professional baseball pitcher in the Arizona Diamondbacks organization.

Aracena signed with the New York Mets as an international free agent in January 2022. On July 25, 2025 the Mets traded Aracena and Cameron Foster to the Baltimore Orioles in exchange for Gregory Soto.

On February 5, 2026, the Orioles traded Aracena, Kade Strowd and José Mejía to the Arizona Diamondbacks for Blaze Alexander. The Diamondbacks added him to their 40-man roster after the 2026 season.

- Career statistics from Baseball Reference (Minors)

=== Blake Bryant ===
Blake Bryant

Arizona Diamondbacks
- Pitcher
- Born: August 24, 2007 (age 19); Douglas, Georgia, U.S.
- Bats: Right Throws: Right

Blake Caden Bryant (born August 24, 2007) is an American professional baseball pitcher in the Arizona Diamondbacks organization.

Bryant attended Citizens Christian Academy in Douglas, Georgia. He won back to back state championships as a junior in 2025 and as a senior in 2026. As a senior, he had a 10–0 win–loss record, a 0.22 earned run average (ERA), and 141 strikeouts across 64 innings alongside a .368 batting average and six home runs. After his high school career, he attended the MLB Draft Combine at Chase Field. He committed to play college baseball at Clemson University.

Bryant was selected by the Arizona Diamondbacks with the 31st overall pick of the 2026 Major League Baseball draft. He signed with the Diamondbacks for a $2.75 million signing bonus.

- Career statistics from Baseball Reference (Minors)

=== Wallace Clark ===
Wallace Clark

Arizona Diamondbacks
- Shortstop
- Born: June 8, 2002 (age 24); London, U.K.
- Bats: Switch Throws: Right

Wallace Ramsey Clark (born June 8, 2002) is an American professional baseball shortstop in the Arizona Diamondbacks organization.

Clark played college baseball for Oklahoma from 2022 to 2023 and for Duke from 2024 to 2025. In 2024, he played collegiate summer baseball with the Hyannis Harbor Hawks of the Cape Cod Baseball League.

Clark was selected by the Arizona Diamondbacks in the 9th round of the 2025 MLB draft.

Clark represented the Great Britain national team at the 2026 World Baseball Classic.

- Career statistics from Baseball Reference (Minors)

=== Demetrio Crisantes ===
Demetrio Crisantes

Arizona Diamondbacks
- Second baseman
- Born: September 5, 2004 (age 22); Tucson, Arizona, U.S.
- Bats: Right Throws: Right

Demetrio Miguel Crisantes (born September 5, 2004) is an American professional baseball second baseman in the Arizona Diamondbacks organization.

Crisantes attended Nogales High School in Nogales, Arizona. He was selected by the Arizona Diamondbacks in the seventh round of the 2022 Major League Baseball draft.

Crisantes signed with the Diamondbacks and made his professional debut in 2023 with the Arizona Complex League Diamondbacks. He started 2024 with the ACL Diamondbacks before being promoted to the Visalia Rawhide.

- Career statistics from Baseball Reference (Minors)

=== J. D. Dix ===
J. D. Dix

Arizona Diamondbacks
- Shortstop
- Born: October 12, 2005 (age 21); Chicago, Illinois, U.S.
- Bats: Both Throws: Right

John Samuel "JD" Dix (born October 12, 2005) is an American professional baseball shortstop in the Arizona Diamondbacks organization.

Dix grew up in Whitefish Bay, Wisconsin and attended Whitefish Bay High School. As a freshman, he batted .449 with 24 RBIs and 21 stolen bases. Dix committed to play college baseball at Alabama after the season. He batted .452 as a junior. Dix was selected to play in the MLB All-American Game during the following summer. He also de-committed from Alabama and flipped his commitment to Wake Forest.

Dix was selected with the 35th selection of the 2024 Major League Baseball draft by the Arizona Diamondbacks. He signed with the Diamondbacks on July 23, 2024, and received an under-slot signing bonus of $2,150,000.

Dix made his professional debut in 2025 with the Arizona Complex League Diamondbacks and was promoted to the Visalia Rawhide in late June. He played in 89 games between both teams and hit .297 with two home runs, 34 RBI and 28 stolen bases. He returned to Visalia to begin the 2026 season and batted .253 with nine home runs, 29 RBI and 19 stolen bases across 48 games before being promoted to the Hillsboro Hops.

- Career statistics from MLB · Baseball Reference (Minors)

=== Kohl Franklin ===
Kohl Franklin

Arizona Diamondbacks
- Pitcher
- Born: September 9, 1999 (age 27); Broken Arrow, Oklahoma, U.S.
- Bats: Right Throws: Right

Kohl Riddle Franklin (born September 9, 1999) is an American professional baseball pitcher in the Arizona Diamondbacks organization.

Franklin attended Broken Arrow High School in Broken Arrow, Oklahoma. He missed a majority of his senior baseball season in 2018 while nursing a fractured foot. After the season, he was selected by the Chicago Cubs in the sixth round (188th overall) of the 2018 Major League Baseball draft. He signed with the Cubs for $540,000, forgoing his college commitment to the University of Oklahoma.

Franklin made his professional debut that year with the Rookie-level Arizona League Cubs, compiling a 6.23 ERA over 8 2/3 innings. In 2019, he spent a majority of the season with the Eugene Emeralds of the Class A Short Season Northwest League, pitching to a 1–3 record with a 2.31 ERA over ten starts, striking out 49 batters over 39 innings. Near the end of the season, he was promoted to the South Bend Cubs of the Class A Midwest League and pitched in one game for them. Franklin did not play a minor league game in 2020 due to the cancellation of the minor league season caused by the COVID-19 pandemic. He missed all of the 2021 season due to an oblique injury and shoulder strain. He was assigned to South Bend (now members of the High-A Midwest League) for the 2022 season. Over 23 starts, he went 3–7 with a 6.88 ERA, 75 strikeouts, and 41 walks over 69 1/3 innings. To open the 2023 season, Franklin returned to South Bend. In mid-May, he was promoted to the Tennessee Smokies of the Double-A Southern League. Over 26 starts between the two teams, Franklin went 4–12 with a 5.40 ERA and 116 strikeouts over 105 innings. He was assigned back to Tennessee to open the 2024 season but pitched only six innings for the year. Franklin underwent Tommy John surgery, and returned to play in 2025 with a rehab appearance with South Bend, but appeared in only one game before being placed back on the 60-day injured list. In 2026, he appeared in 12 games between the Arizona Complex League, South Bend, and the Iowa Cubs of the Triple-A International League and had a 1–2 record and 3.22 ERA over 44 2/3 innings. He elected free agency on November 2.

On November 11, 2026, Franklin signed a minor league contract with the Arizona Diamondbacks.

Franklin's father, Jay Franklin, is a baseball agent as well as the president of BBI Sports Group, representing MLB players such as Dylan Bundy, Ian Kinsler, and Archie Bradley. He is also the nephew of former MLB pitcher Ryan Franklin.

- Career statistics from Baseball Reference (Minors)

=== Spencer Giesting ===
Spencer Giesting

Arizona Diamondbacks
- Pitcher
- Born: July 2, 2001 (age 25); Fairfield, Ohio, U.S.
- Bats: Left Throws: Left

Spencer William Giesting (born July 2, 2001) is an American professional baseball pitcher in the Arizona Diamondbacks organization.

Giesting attended Father Stephen T. Badin High School in Hamilton, Ohio, and played college baseball at the University of Charlotte. During the summer of 2021, he played in the Cape Cod Baseball League with the Harwich Mariners. As a sophomore in 2022, he appeared in twenty games (six starts) and went 7–4 with a 3.75 ERA over 74 1/3 innings. After the season, Giesting was selected by the Arizona Diamondbacks in the 11th round of the 2022 Major League Baseball draft. Giesting signed with Arizona for $400,000.

Giesting made his professional debut that season with the Arizona Complex League Diamondbacks before playing with the Visalia Rawhide, pitching a total of 15 1/3 innings between both teams. He played the 2023 season with the Hillsboro Hops, starting 24 games and going 7–4 with a 4.00 ERA and 124 strikeouts over 117 innings. Giesting opened the 2024 season with Hillsboro and was promoted to the Amarillo Sod Poodles in mid-June. He was named the Diamondbacks Minor League Pitcher of the Month in September. Over 25 starts between both teams, he posted a 9–10 record and 3.31 ERA with 154 strikeouts in 141 1/3 innings. Giesting was assigned to Amarillo to open the 2025 season and was promoted to the Reno Aces in early June. He started 27 games for the season and went 8–9 with a 5.31 ERA and 131 strikeouts over 135 2/3 innings. Giesting was assigned to Reno to open the 2026 season and began pitching out of the bullpen; he was placed on the injured list with an oblique injury after one appearance. He returned to play in 33 games for Reno and had a 3–2 record with a 4.61 ERA and 68 strikeouts over 52 2/3 innings. After the season, the Diamondbacks added Giesting to their 40-man roster to protect him from the Rule 5 draft.

- Career statistics from MLB · Baseball Reference (Minors)
- Charlotte 49ers bio

=== David Hagaman ===
David Hagaman

Arizona Diamondbacks
- Pitcher
- Born: April 16, 2003 (age 23); Somers Point, New Jersey, U.S.
- Bats: Right Throws: Right

David Edward Hagaman (born April 16, 2003) is an American professional baseball pitcher in the Arizona Diamondbacks organization.

Hagaman attended Holy Spirit High School in Absecon, New Jersey and played college baseball at West Virginia University. He was selected by the Texas Rangers in the fourth round of the 2024 Major League Baseball draft. He made his professional debut with the Arizona Complex League Rangers and was promoted to the Hickory Crawdads.

On July 31, 2025, the Rangers traded Hagaman, Kohl Drake, and Mitch Bratt to the Arizona Diamondbacks in exchange for Merrill Kelly. He opened his Diamondbacks career with the Hillsboro Hops. After the season he pitched in the Arizona Fall League.

- Career statistics from Baseball Reference (Minors)

=== Jack Hurley ===
Jack Hurley

Arizona Diamondbacks
- Outfielder
- Born: March 13, 2002 (age 24); State College, Pennsylvania, U.S.
- Bats: Left Throws: Right

Jack Bratton Hurley (born March 13, 2002) is an American professional baseball outfielder in the Arizona Diamondbacks organization.

Hurley attended State College Area High School in State College, Pennsylvania and played college baseball at Virginia Tech. In 2022, he played collegiate summer baseball with the Bourne Braves of the Cape Cod Baseball League. After three years at Virginia Tech, he was drafted by the Arizona Diamondbacks in the third round of the 2023 Major League Baseball draft.

Hurley signed with the Diamondbacks and spent his first professional season with the Arizona Complex League Diamondbacks, Visalia Rawhide and Hillsboro Hops.

- Career statistics from MLB · Baseball Reference (Minors)
- Virginia Tech Hokies bio

=== Ashton Izzi ===
Ashton Izzi

Arizona Diamondbacks
- Pitcher
- Born: November 18, 2003 (age 23); Omaha, Nebraska, U.S.
- Bats: Right Throws: Right

Ashton John Izzi (born November 18, 2003) is an American professional baseball pitcher for the Arizona Diamondbacks organization.

Izzi attended Oswego East High School in Oswego, Illinois. He committed to attend Wichita State University. The Seattle Mariners selected Izzi in the fourth round, with the 126th overall selection, of the 2022 MLB draft. He signed with the Mariners rather than attend college. The Mariners assigned Izzi to the Everett AquaSox in 2025.

On July 24, 2025, the Mariners traded Izzi and Brandyn Garcia to the Diamondbacks in exchange for Josh Naylor.

Izzi and his fiancé, Charlotte, became engaged at Funko Field in 2025.

- Career statistics from Baseball Reference (Minors)

=== Jakey Josepha ===
Jakey Josepha

Arizona Diamondbacks
- Outfielder
- Born: May 15, 2004 (age 22); Willemstad, Curaçao
- Bats: Left Throws: Right

Jakey Jair Isaiah Josepha (born May 15, 2004) is a Curaçaoan professional baseball outfielder in the Arizona Diamondbacks organization.

Josepha signed with the Arizona Diamondbacks in January 2021.

He represented Curaçao in the 2016 Little League World Series.

Josepha represented the Netherlands national team at the 2026 World Baseball Classic.

- Career statistics from Baseball Reference (Minors)

=== Manuel Peña ===
Manuel Peña

Arizona Diamondbacks
- Infielder
- Born: December 5, 2003 (age 22); Santo Domingo, Dominican Republic
- Bats: Left Throws: Right

Manuel Ernesto Peña (born December 5, 2003) is a Dominican professional baseball infielder in the Arizona Diamondbacks organization.

Peña signed with the Arizona Diamondbacks as an international free agent in January 2021. He made his professional debut that year with the Dominican Summer League Diamondbacks. He played 2022 with the Arizona Complex League Diamondbacks and Visalia Rawhide, 2023 with Visalia and the Hillsboro Hops and 2024 with Visalia.

Peña played 2025 with the Amarillo Sod Poodles and started 2026 with Amarillo before being promoted to the Reno Aces.

- Career statistics from Baseball Reference (Minors)

=== Dylan Ray ===
Dylan Ray

Arizona Diamondbacks – No. 61
- Pitcher
- Born: May 9, 2001 (age 25); Huntsville, Alabama, U.S.
- Bats: Right Throws: Right

Dylan Jabe Ray (born May 9, 2001) is an American professional baseball pitcher for the Arizona Diamondbacks of Major League Baseball (MLB).

Ray attended Bob Jones High School in Madison, Alabama and played college baseball at the University of Alabama. He missed the 2021 season recovering from Tommy John surgery and returned in 2022 as the team's closer. In 2022, he played collegiate summer baseball with the Yarmouth–Dennis Red Sox of the Cape Cod Baseball League.

Ray was drafted by the Arizona Diamondbacks in the fourth round of the 2022 Major League Baseball draft. He spent his first season with the Arizona Complex League Diamondbacks and Visalia Rawhide. He started 2023 with the Hillsboro Hops before being promoted to the Double-A Amarillo Sod Poodles.

Ray made 28 starts split between Amarillo and the Triple-A Reno Aces in 2025, accumulating a 12–6 record and 5.45 ERA with 123 strikeouts across 140 1/3 innings pitched. On November 18, 2025, the Diamondbacks added Ray to their 40-man roster to protect him from the Rule 5 draft.

Ray was optioned to Triple-A Reno to begin the 2026 season.

- Career statistics from Baseball Reference (Minors)
- Alabama Crimson Tide bio

=== Cristofer Torin ===
Cristofer Torin

Arizona Diamondbacks
- Infielder
- Born: May 26, 2005 (age 21); Acarigua, Venezuela
- Bats: Right Throws: Right

Cristofer William Torin (born May 26, 2005) is a Venezuelan professional baseball infielder in the Arizona Diamondbacks organization.

Torin signed with the Arizona Diamondbacks as an international free agent in January 2022. The Diamondbacks added him to their 40-man roster after the 2026 season.

- Career statistics from Baseball Reference (Minors)

=== Jesús Valdez ===
Jesús Valdez

Arizona Diamondbacks
- Infielder
- Born: December 29, 1997 (age 28); Bani, Dominican Republic
- Bats: Right Throws: Right

Jesús Manuel Valdez (born December 29, 1997) is a Dominican professional baseball infielder in the Arizona Diamondbacks organization. He is currently a phantom ballplayer, having spent a day on Arizona's active roster without making an appearance.

On April 26, 2026, the Diamondbacks selected Valdez's contract during the MLB Mexico City Series and optioned him to the Double-A Amarillo Sod Poodles; he was subsequently designated as the team's 27th man for that day's game against the San Diego Padres. On May 5, Valdez was removed from the 40-man roster and sent outright to the Triple-A Reno Aces.

- Career statistics from MLB · Baseball Reference (Minors)

=== Carlos Virahonda ===
Carlos Virahonda

Arizona Diamondbacks
- Catcher
- Born: December 13, 2005 (age 20); Caucagua, Venezuela
- Bats: Right Throws: Right

Carlos Daniel Virahonda (born December 13, 2005) is a Venezuelan professional baseball catcher in the Arizona Diamondbacks organization.

Virahonda signed with the Arizona Diamondbacks as an international free agent in January 2023. He made his professional debut that year with the Dominican Summer League Diamondbacks and played 2024 with them. He started 2025 with the Arizona Complex League Diamondbacks before being promoted to the Visalia Rawhide.

Virahonda started 2026 and was promoted to the Hillsboro Hops.

- Career statistics from Baseball Reference (Minors)

=== A. J. Vukovich ===
A. J. Vukovich

Arizona Diamondbacks
- Third baseman
- Born: July 20, 2001 (age 25); Mukwonago, Wisconsin, U.S.
- Bats: Right Throws: Right

Aaron Jeffrey Vukovich (born July 20, 2001) is an American professional baseball third baseman in the Arizona Diamondbacks organization.

Vukovich attended East Troy High School in East Troy, Wisconsin. He was drafted by the Arizona Diamondbacks in the fourth round of the 2020 Major League Baseball draft. He played his first season in 2021 with the Visalia Rawhide and Hillsboro Hops. In his 92 games that season, he had a .272/.320/.446 slash line, with 100 hits, 19 doubles, 3 triples, 13 home runs, 62 RBI, and 16 stolen bases

Vukovich started 2022 with Hillsboro before being promoted to the Amarillo Sod Poodles. He reached Triple-A in 2024, returning to the Triple-A Reno Aces in 2025.

On November 3, 2026, Vukovich re-signed with the Diamondbacks on a new minor league contract for the 2027 season.

- Career statistics from Baseball Reference (Minors)

== Full Triple-A to Rookie League rosters ==
=== Triple-A ===
Reno Aces roster
Players		Coaches/Other
Pitchers: -- Kyle Amendt; 61 Casey Anderson; -- Kohl Franklin; 27 Bryce Jarvis; 18 Yu-Min Lin; 54 Landon Sims	Catchers: -- Aramis Garcia; Infielders: 10 Gavin Conticello; 11 Logan Mercado; 24 Manuel Peña; 3 Anderdson Rojas; 29 Luis Urías; Outfielders: -- Ismael Munguia; 33 A. J. Vukovich; 21 Trent Youngblood	Manager: 12 Jeff Gardner; Coaches: 55 Jeff Bajenaru (pitching); 51 Doug Drabek (pitching); 25 Josue Perez (hitting); 60 Jordan Procyshen (coach); 44 Shawn Roof (bench); 43 Terrmel Sledge (hitting); 7-day injured list; * On Arizona Diamondbacks 40-man roster; ~ Development list; # Rehab assignment; ∞ Reserve list; ‡ Restricted list; § Suspended list; † Temporarily inactive list; Roster updated November 17, 2026; Transactions; → More rosters: MiLB • Pacific Coast League; → Arizona Diamondbacks minor league players

=== Double-A ===
Amarillo Sod Poodles roster
Players		Coaches/Other
Pitchers: 43 Roman Angelo; 10 Joe Ariola; 24 Alec Baker; 27 Dawson Brown; 16 Yordin Chalas; 33 Billy Corcoran; 32 Hunter Cranton; 30 Josh Grosz; 31 David Hagaman; -- Sean Harney; 28 Sawyer Hawks; 23 Will Mabrey; 38 Mason Marriott; 16 Antonio Menendez; 35 Logan Mercado; 14 Alfred Morillo; 31 Adonys Perez; 11 Carlos Rey; 26 Junior Sanchez; 41 John West	Catchers: 29 Gavin Logan; 20 Carlos Virahonda; Infielders: 10 Jansel Luis; 13 Ben McLaughlin; 9 Danny Serretti; 12 Yassel Soler; 2 Jean Walters; Outfielders: 25 Avery Owusu-Asiedu; 16 Jack Hurley; 3 Angel Ortiz	Manager: 22 Javier Colina; Coaches: -- Jaime Del Valle (bench); 18 Gaby Hernandez (pitching); -- Ronald Ramirez (bench); 45 Ty Wright (hitting); 7-day injured list; * On Arizona Diamondbacks 40-man roster; ~ Development list; # Rehab assignment; ∞ Reserve list; ‡ Restricted list; § Suspended list; † Temporarily inactive list; Roster updated November 17, 2026; Transactions; → More rosters: MiLB • Texas League; → Arizona Diamondbacks minor league players

=== High-A ===
Hillsboro Hops roster
Players		Coaches/Other
Pitchers: 2 Kyle Ayers; 21 Rio Britton; 1 Junior Ciprian; 17 Luke Craig; 18 Luke Dotson; -- Jake Fitzgibbons; 20 Patrick Forbes; 23 Joangel Gonzalez; 31 Caden Grice; 12 Alexis Liebano; 12 Dean Livingston; 36 Augie Mojica; 19 Tayler Montiel; 33 Rocco Reid; 38 Nate Savino; 34 Jacob Steinmetz	Catchers: 29 Alberto Barriga; 13 Kenny Castillo; 28 Adrian De Leon; 25 Ivan Luciano; Infielders: 32 Diosfran Cabeza; 5 Wallace Clark; 22 Kayson Cunningham; 19 Abdias De La Cruz; 14 J. D. Dix; 26 Chris Katz; 9 Modeifi Marte; 4 José Mejía; 35 Yerald Nin; 16 Adrian Rodriguez; Outfielders: 35 Jose Alpuria; 3 Slade Caldwell; 8 Brady Counsell; 29 Jakey Josepha	Manager: 7 Mark Reed; Coaches: 30 James Adduci (assistant hitting); 43 Blake Nation (pitching); 0 Gift Ngoepe (bench); 7-day injured list; * On Arizona Diamondbacks 40-man roster; ~ Development list; # Rehab assignment; ∞ Reserve list; ‡ Restricted list; § Suspended list; † Temporarily inactive list; Roster updated November 2, 2026; Transactions; → More rosters: MiLB • Northwest League; → Arizona Diamondbacks minor league players

=== Single-A ===
Visalia Rawhide roster
Players		Coaches/Other
Pitchers: -- Ryan Bruno; 33 Anderson Cardenas; 19 Jesus Escobar; 36 Mervin Fell; 16 Connor Foley; 34 Alex Galvan; 11 Raul Garayzar; 31 Samuel Gonzalez; 39 Simon Gregersen; 29 Julian Hernandez; 6 Chung-Hsiang Huang; 38 Jaitoine Kelly; 5 Juan Ledezma; -- Hayden Murphy; 31 Daniel Nunez; 23 Neiker Palacios; 18 Wilkin Paredes; 34 Gregori Ramirez; 27 Erick Reynoso; 14 Kelvin Rosario; -- Collin Rothermel; 17 David Sanchez; -- Josdanner Suarez; 37 Daury Vasquez; 23 Andrew Wertz; 38 Ricardo Yan; -- Deyer Zapata	Catchers: -- Juan Centeno; 25 Ryder Helfrick; 24 Weber Neels; Infielders: 10 Tytus Cissell; -- Alfredo Guanchez; 3 Carson Kerce; 21 Enyervert Perez; 30 Victor Santana; 9 Jack Spanier; Outfielders: -- Loidel Amaya; 22 Pedro Blanco; 23 Pedro Catuy; 16 Brayden Dowd; 4 Jake Duer; 35 Nathan Hall; 24 Adriel Radney; 13 Paul Schoenfeld; 17 Bo Walker	Manager: 2 Dee Garner; Coaches: 12 Jancarlos Cintron (hitting); 26 Rolando Garza (pitching); 40 Mickey Jiang (bench); 7-day injured list; * On Arizona Diamondbacks 40-man roster; ~ Development list; # Rehab assignment; ∞ Reserve list; ‡ Restricted list; § Suspended list; † Temporarily inactive list; Roster updated November 2, 2026; Transactions; → More rosters: MiLB • California League; → Arizona Diamondbacks minor league players

=== Rookie ===
Arizona Complex League Diamondbacks roster
Players		Coaches/Other
Pitchers: 16 Raminel Almonte; 50 Angel Beltran; -- Blake Bryant; 30 Jeury Espinal; -- Andrew Evans; -- Caleb Jameson; -- Joseph Jasso; 18 Yan Mago; -- Josh McDevitt; -- LJ Mercurius; 15 Naimer Rosario; -- Joel Sarver; -- Mason Steele; 29 Isael Torres; -- Carson Turnquist; 40 Modesto Vargas; -- Brannon Westmoreland; -- Micah Worley; 13 Gian Zapata	Catchers: 35 Johan Fernandez; -- Alejandro Rios; 14 Jose Urbina; Infielders: -- Eliesbert Alejos; 2 Alfredo Benzan; -- Cody Boshell; 9 Erick De La Cruz; 4 Jorge Lara; 17 Mason Marriott #; 8 Eybert Sanchez; 12 Kyle Sinzza; Outfielders: -- Juan Alvarez; 48 Mayki De La Rosa; 52 Raily Liriano	Manager: 3 Juan Francia; Coaches: 34 Ronnie Gajownik (bench); 3 Chuy Mendoza (pitching); 2 Tommy Murphy (hitting); 13 John Pachot (coach); 7-day injured list; * On Arizona Diamondbacks 40-man roster; ~ Development list; # Rehab assignment; ∞ Reserve list; ‡ Restricted list; § Suspended list; † Temporarily inactive list; Roster updated November 2, 2026; Transactions; → More rosters: MiLB • Arizona Complex League; → Arizona Diamondbacks minor league players

=== Foreign Rookie ===
Dominican Summer League Arizona Black roster
Players		Coaches/Other
Pitchers: 17 Deyvi Almonte; 32 Francis Aquino; 23 Diland Cepeda; 19 Luis Cepeda; 46 Gustavo De La Cruz; 29 Oscar Echegarreta; 24 Hensley Eusebio; 27 Berlin Fransua; 10 Alfredo Guzman; 28 Daonil Montero; -- Yohansis Pena; 29 Eleazar Suarez; 33 Miguel Vargas; 22 Keivan Vasquez	Catchers: 12 Angel Chacon; 13 Santiago Gil; 9 Jesus Linares; 8 Jeshua Mendez; 13 Jose Rodriguez; Infielders: 14 Brayan Figueroa; 7 Ruben Gallego; 15 Felix Genao; 3 Rodrigo Gonzalez; 4 Jorge Silvera; Outfielders: 16 Jossiel Feliz; 5 Joscar Hernandez; 2 Albert Medina; 35 Nicola Perdomo; 30 Jose Requena; 1 Belfi Rivera	Manager: 46 Lisandro King; Coaches: -- Alexander Benua (coach); -- Omar Camilo (coach); -- Jiter Heredia (coach); 24 Manuel Ramirez (hitting); 14 Samuel Rivas (coach); 30 Manuel Soliman (pitching); 16 Luis Sumoza (hitting); 7-day injured list; * On Arizona Diamondbacks 40-man roster; ~ Development list; # Rehab assignment; ∞ Reserve list; ‡ Restricted list; § Suspended list; † Temporarily inactive list; Roster updated November 5, 2026; Transactions; → More rosters: MiLB • Dominican Summer League; → Arizona Diamondbacks minor league players

Dominican Summer League Arizona Red roster
Players		Coaches/Other
Pitchers: 39 Brayan Aquino; 34 Jose Belisario; 32 Samuel Bello; 27 Johan Calcano; 10 Luis Carrasco; 28 Greudis De Los Santos; 31 Emmy De Oleo; 4 Andy Encarnacion; 29 Yaury Jimenez; 26 Emiliano Mache; 33 Jeyver Manaure; 23 Isaac Mendez; 34 Hector Ozuna; 9 Geremias Pena; 12 Jose Puello; 25 Stiven Rogers; 24 Heriberto Ron; 35 Samuel Santos; 21 Gregory Sipion	Catchers: 19 Robert Lantigua; 18 Ismael Mejia; 8 Sebastian Mireles; 7 Jhosep Villaroel; Infielders: 5 Juan Brima; 13 Alam Bruno; 3 Leonardo Sevilla; 6 Angel Suarez; Outfielders: 27 Manny Almonte; 17 Elian De La Cruz; 22 Jun-Sang Eom; 2 Yohendi Hernandez; 1 D-Shawn Martina; 17 Yamir Mendieta; 15 Jose Pitre; 30 Ronny Suarez; 16 Jeremy Suriel	Manager: 1 Vladimir Frias; Coaches: 18 Luis Alen (coach); 30 Rafael Guerrero (hitting); 31 Danny Salazar (pitching); -- Jeudy Valdez (coach); 56 Fermin Ward (coach); 7-day injured list; * On Arizona Diamondbacks 40-man roster; ~ Development list; # Rehab assignment; ∞ Reserve list; ‡ Restricted list; § Suspended list; † Temporarily inactive list; Roster updated November 5, 2026; Transactions; → More rosters: MiLB • Dominican Summer League; → Arizona Diamondbacks minor league players
