= Blaze Alexander =

American baseball player (born 1999)

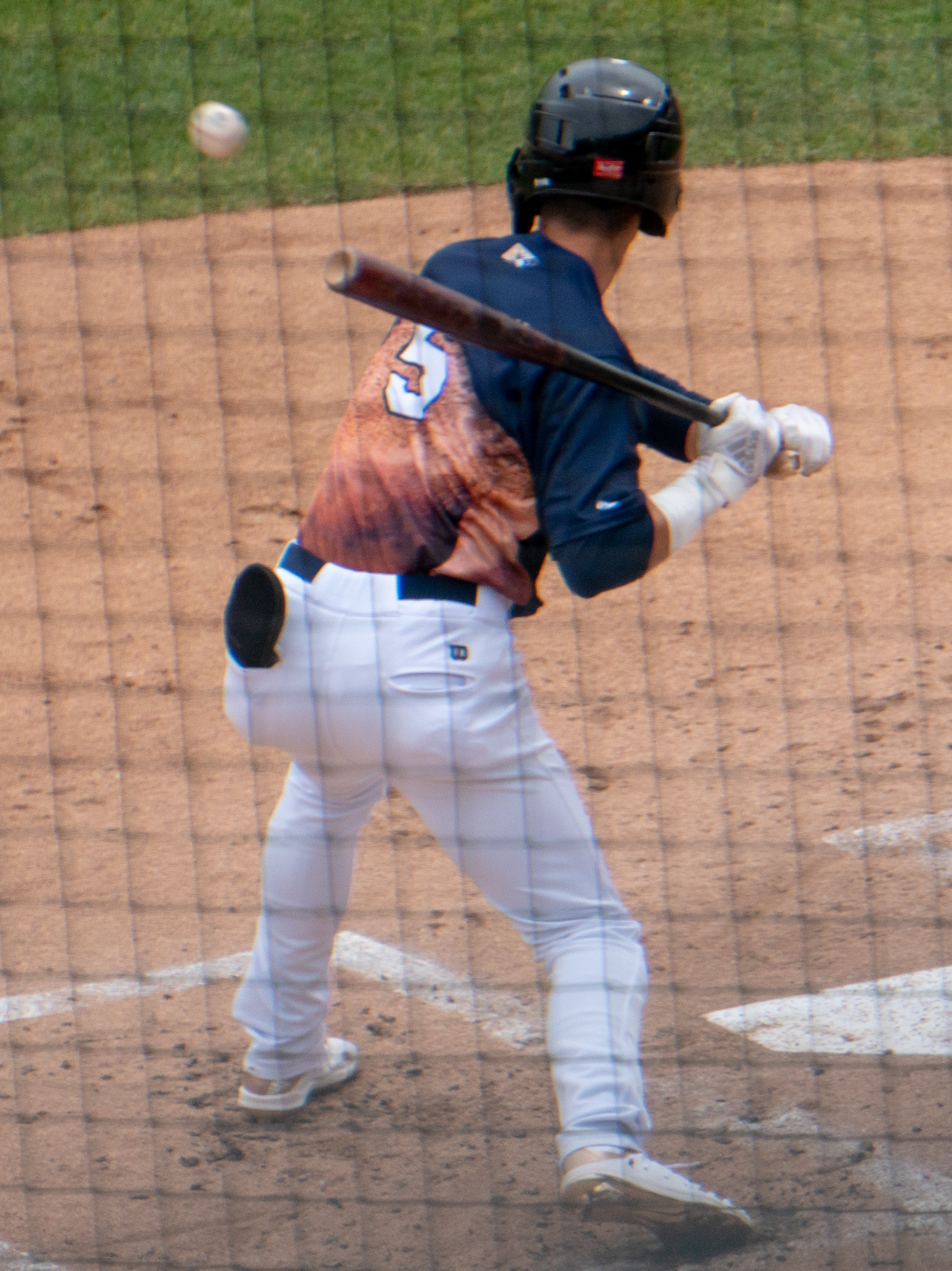
- Alexander with the Kane County Cougars in 2019

Baltimore Orioles – No. 23
- Infielder
- Born: June 11, 1999 (age 27); Cape Coral, Florida, U.S.
- Bats: Right Throws: Right

MLB debut
- March 28, 2024, for the Arizona Diamondbacks

MLB statistics (through 2026 season)
- Batting average: .263
- Home runs: 14
- Runs batted in: 80
- Stats at Baseball Reference

Teams
- Arizona Diamondbacks (2024–2025); Baltimore Orioles (2026–present)

Blaze Chanee Alexander (born June 11, 1999) is an American professional baseball infielder for the Baltimore Orioles of Major League Baseball (MLB). He has previously played in MLB for the Arizona Diamondbacks. He made his MLB debut in 2024.

== Career ==
Alexander attended Bishop Verot High School in Fort Myers, Florida, and transferred to IMG Academy in Bradenton, Florida, for his senior year.

=== Arizona Diamondbacks ===
Alexander was drafted by the Arizona Diamondbacks in the 11th round (339th overall) of the 2018 Major League Baseball draft. Alexander spent his first professional season with the rookie-level Arizona League Diamondbacks and rookie-level Missoula Osprey. He played 2019 with the Single-A Kane County Cougars.

Alexander did not play in a game in 2020 due to the cancellation of the Minor League Baseball season because of the COVID-19 pandemic. He returned to action in 2021 to play for the High-A Hillsboro Hops and started 2022 with the Double-A Amarillo Sod Poodles. On November 15, 2022, the Diamondbacks added Alexander to their 40-man roster to protect him from the Rule 5 draft.

Alexander was optioned to the Triple-A Reno Aces to begin the 2023 season. In 73 games for Reno, he batted .292/.408/.458 with eight home runs and 52 RBI.

Alexander made Arizona's 2024 Opening Day roster. Alexander made 61 appearances for the Diamondbacks during his rookie campaign, batting .247/.321/.343 with three home runs, 21 RBI, and three stolen bases.

Alexander played in 74 contests for the Diamondbacks during the 2025 season, slashing .230/.323/.383 with seven home runs, 28 RBI, and four stolen bases.

=== Baltimore Orioles ===
On February 5, 2026, Alexander was traded to the Baltimore Orioles in exchange for Kade Strowd, Wellington Aracena, and José Mejía. On July 12, Alexander broke his left hand when he was hit by a pitch by Kansas City Royals reliever Lucas Erceg.

== Personal life ==
Blaze is the nephew of former MLB pitcher Dan Plesac and the cousin of pitcher Zach Plesac. His brother, CJ, also plays baseball professionally.
