= Dominican Summer League Diamondbacks =

- Boca Chica

Minor league affiliations
- Class: Rookie
- League: Dominican Summer League
- Division: Boca Chica Baseball City

Major league affiliations
- Team: Arizona Diamondbacks

Minor league titles
- League titles (0): None

Team data
- Name: Diamondbacks
- Ballpark: Baseball City Complex
- Owner/ Operator: Arizona Diamondbacks
- Manager: Lisandro King

The Dominican Summer League Diamondbacks or DSL Diamondbacks, commonly called the DSL D-backs, are a Rookie League affiliate of the Arizona Diamondbacks based in the Dominican Republic. They play in the Baseball City Division of the Dominican Summer League.

== History ==
The team first came into existence in 1996, two years before the MLB debut of the Arizona Diamondbacks. They have been an independent D-backs affiliate throughout their history, although there have been a few seasons where a second squad shared affiliation with other teams.

In 2000, a second squad shared an affiliation with the Boston Red Sox. In 2003, a second squad shared an affiliation with the Montreal Expos. A second squad shared an affiliation with the Cincinnati Reds in 2008, and again in 2012.

== Rosters ==
Dominican Summer League Arizona Black roster
Players	Coaches/Other
Pitchers: 26 Deyvi Almonte; 32 Francis Aquino; 29 Jose Belisario; 27 Luis Carrasco; 25 Jhossua Castro; 19 Luis Cepeda; 46 Gustavo De La Cruz; 11 Andy Encarnacion; 24 Hensley Eusebio; 21 Emiliano Mache; 28 Daonil Montero; 10 Jose Puello; 23 Heriberto Ron; 31 Samuel Santos; 33 Miguel Vargas; 22 Keivan Vasquez; Catchers: 12 Angel Chacon; 8 Jeshua Mendez; 13 Jose Rodriguez; 9 Jhosep Villaroel; Infielders: 7 Juan Brima; 14 Alam Bruno; 17 Ruben Gallego; 15 Felix Genao; 3 Rodrigo Gonzalez; 4 Jorge Silvera; Outfielders: 16 Jossiel Feliz; 5 Joscar Hernandez; 2 Yamir Mendieta; 35 Nicola Perdomo; 30 Jose Requena; 1 Belfi Rivera	Manager: 46 Lisandro King; Coaches: -- Alexander Benoa (coach); -- Omar Camilo (coach); -- Jiter Heredia (coach); 24 Manuel Ramirez (hitting); 14 Samuel Rivas (coach); 30 Manuel Soliman (pitching); 16 Luis Sumoza (hitting); 60-day injured list: 13 Santiago Gil; -- Yohansis Pena; 7-day injured list; * On Arizona Diamondbacks 40-man roster; ~ Development list; # Rehab assignment; ∞ Reserve list; ‡ Restricted list; § Suspended list; † Temporarily inactive list; Roster updated June 20, 2026; Transactions; → More rosters: MiLB • Dominican Summer League; → Arizona Diamondbacks minor league players

Dominican Summer League Arizona Red roster
Players	Coaches/Other
Pitchers: 39 Brayan Aquino; 32 Samuel Bello; 24 Diland Cepeda; 28 Greudis De Los Santos; 34 Emmy De Oleo; 31 Oscar Echegarreta; 11 Berlin Fransua; 12 Alfredo Guzman; 29 Yaury Jimenez; 33 Jeyver Manaure; 23 Isaac Mendez; 34 Hector Ozuna; 9 Geremias Pena; 25 Stiven Rogers; 22 Gregory Sanchez; 21 Gregory Sipion; 10 Robert Terrero; 26 Miguel Valdez; Catchers: 19 Robert Lantigua; 7 Jesus Linares; 18 Ismael Mejia; 8 Sebastian Mireles; Infielders: 13 Brayan Figueroa; 3 Leonardo Sevilla; 6 Angel Suarez; Outfielders: 27 Manny Almonte; 4 Loidel Amaya; 17 Elian De La Cruz; 2 Yohendi Hernandez; 1 D-Shawn Martina; 14 Albert Medina; 15 Jose Pitre; 30 Ronny Suarez; 16 Jeremy Suriel	Manager: 1 Vladimir Frias; Coaches: 18 Luis Alen (coach); 30 Rafael Guerrero (hitting); 31 Danny Salazar (pitching); -- Jeudy Valdez (coach); 56 Fermin Ward (coach); 60-day injured list: 27 Johan Calcano; 11 Alfredo Guanchez; 7-day injured list; * On Arizona Diamondbacks 40-man roster; ~ Development list; # Rehab assignment; ∞ Reserve list; ‡ Restricted list; § Suspended list; † Temporarily inactive list; Roster updated June 20, 2026; Transactions; → More rosters: MiLB • Dominican Summer League; → Arizona Diamondbacks minor league players

== Minor league affiliations ==
Class	Team	League	Location	Ballpark	Affiliated
Triple-A	Reno Aces	Pacific Coast League	Reno, Nevada	Greater Nevada Field	2009
Double-A	Amarillo Sod Poodles	Texas League	Amarillo, Texas	Hodgetown	2021
High-A	Hillsboro Hops	Northwest League	Hillsboro, Oregon	Ron Tonkin Field	2013
Single-A	Visalia Rawhide	California League	Visalia, California	Valley Strong Ballpark	2007
Rookie	ACL D-backs	Arizona Complex League	Scottsdale, Arizona	Salt River Fields at Talking Stick	2024
Rookie	DSL Arizona Black	Dominican Summer League	Boca Chica, Santo Domingo	Baseball City Complex	2016
Rookie	DSL Arizona Red	Dominican Summer League	Boca Chica, Santo Domingo	Baseball City Complex	2016
