= Landon Sims =

American baseball player (born 2001)

Arizona Diamondbacks
- Pitcher
- Born: January 3, 2001 (age 25); Lawrenceville, Georgia, U.S.
- Bats: Right Throws: Right
Medals
Men's baseball
Representing United States
U-15 Baseball World Cup
Bronze medal – third place	2016 Iwaki	Team

Landon Thomas Sims (born January 3, 2001) is an American professional baseball pitcher in the Arizona Diamondbacks organization.

== Amateur career ==
Sims attended South Forsyth High School in Cumming, Georgia, where he played on the football team as a safety and on the baseball team as a pitcher. As a sophomore in 2017, he went 6–2 with a 2.10 ERA and 58 strikeouts over fifty innings. As a junior, he won ten games while pitching to a 0.90 ERA over 62 innings. Sims went unselected in the 2019 Major League Baseball draft and enrolled at Mississippi State University to play college baseball.

Sims made seven appearances as a freshman on the Mississippi State Bulldogs baseball team in 2020 and compiled a 3.46 ERA before the season was cancelled due to the COVID-19 pandemic. In 2021, he became the team's closer. For the season, he made 25 relief appearances and went 5–0 with a 1.44 ERA, 100 strikeouts, 15 walks and 13 saves over 56 1/3 innings. Sims, alongside Will Bednar, threw a combined one-hitter against the Vanderbilt Commodores in the final game of the 2021 College World Series, leading the Bulldogs to their first ever championship. He was named to the USA Baseball National Collegiate Team after the season. Sims entered the 2022 season as a top prospect for the upcoming draft. For the season, he moved into the starting rotation. He was named the team's Opening Day starter and pitched seven innings in which he gave up one earned run, seven hits, no walks, and 13 strikeouts in a 3-0 loss to Long Beach State. On March 4, in a game against the Tulane Green Wave, Sims was removed in the fourth inning due to a right arm injury. On March 14, it was announced that he had torn his ulnar collateral ligament and would undergo Tommy John surgery, forcing him to miss the remainder of the season. Over 15 2/3 innings pitched in 2022, he compiled a 1.15 ERA and 27 strikeouts.

== Professional career ==
Sims was selected by the Arizona Diamondbacks with the 34th overall selection of the 2022 Major League Baseball draft. He signed with the team for $2.35 million.

Sims made his professional debut in 2023 during a rehab assignment with the Arizona Complex League Diamondbacks, and was later assigned to the Visalia Rawhide. Over 24 1/3 innings pitched during the season, he went 0–4 with a 5.47 ERA and 28 strikeouts. He was assigned to Visalia to open the 2024 season and was later promoted to the Hillsboro Hops. Over 41 appearances between the two teams, Sims went 4–0 with a 3.07 ERA and 85 strikeouts over 58 2/3 innings. He was assigned to the Amarillo Sod Poodles to open the 2025 season. Sims played the entirety of the season with Amarillo and made 49 relief appearances in which he went 4–2 with 12 saves, 3.63 ERA, and 57 strikeouts across 52 innings.

Sims opened the 2026 season with Amarillo and was promoted to the Reno Aces in June. Across 49 relief appearances between both clubs, he had a 2–5 record, a 4.78 ERA, 45 strikeouts, and nine saves over 58 1/3 innings.
