= Andy Yerzy =

Canadian baseball player (born 1998)

Free agent
- Catcher / First baseman
- Born: July 5, 1998 (age 28); North York, Ontario, Canada
- Bats: Left Throws: Right
- Stats at Baseball Reference

Andrew Jacob Yerzy (born July 5, 1998) is a Canadian professional baseball catcher and first baseman who is a free agent. He was drafted by the Arizona Diamondbacks in the second round of the 2016 Major League Baseball draft.

== Early life ==
Yerzy, a native of North York, Ontario, was born to David and Patricia (née Wong) Yerzy, has two older brothers, and is Jewish. His paternal grandparents were Eric Yerzy (whose parents and siblings were murdered in the Holocaust) and Sonia Yerzy. His maternal grandparents were Cheuck Yu Wong and Shun Kiu Susan Wong. He attended York Mills Collegiate Institute in Toronto.

== Career ==
=== Amateur career ===
Yerzy was selected for the Junior Canadian National Baseball Team at the age of 15. He was co-champion of Major League Baseball's Junior Home Run Derby at the 2015 Major League Baseball All-Star Game. In 2016 he was named a Rawlings-Perfect Game Third Team All-American.

=== Arizona Diamondbacks ===
==== 2016–18 ====
Yerzy was drafted by the Arizona Diamondbacks in the second round of the 2016 Major League Baseball draft, 52nd overall. He was the third-highest Major League Baseball draft pick ever from the Greater Toronto Area, behind Josh Naylor (12th overall in 2015 by the Miami Marlins) and Joey Votto (44th overall in 2002 by the Cincinnati Reds). He had signed a letter of intent to attend the University of Notre Dame, but instead signed for a signing bonus of $1.214 million. It was the 11th-highest bonus ever given a Canadian baseball player. Arizona scouting director Deric Ladnier said: "He has massive power." D-backs manager Chip Hale said "Now he's just got to graduate high school and ... start his career... he's as good looking of a 17-year-old as I've seen."

After being drafted, at the age of 17, Yerzy played for both the rookie-level Arizona League Diamondbacks and the Missoula Osprey in 2016. He posted a combined .216 batting average with one home run and 16 RBI in 45 total games between both teams, while playing catcher. After the 2016 season, Baseball America ranked him Arizona's #14 prospect.

He spent 2017 with Missoula. Yerzy greatly improved over his debut, batting .298/.365/.524 with 13 home runs (tied for 6th in the Pioneer League), 45 RBI and an .890 OPS in 54 games.

Yerzy played all of 2018 with the Hillsboro Hops, slashing .297/.382/.452 with eight home runs (tied for 8th in the Northwest League), 34 RBIs (9th), and 34 walks (8th) in 63 games. He was both a Northwest League Mid-Season All Star and a Northwest League Post-Season All Star for Hillsboro.

==== 2019–22 ====
Yerzy split 2019 between the Hillsboro Hops and the Kane County Cougars in the Single-A Midwest League, batting a combined .179/.279/.275 with 46 walks, six home runs, and 39 RBI in 357 at-bats. His 34 RBIs and 37 walks with Hillsboro were both 6th in the league. Yerzy did not play in a game in 2020 due to the cancellation of the minor league season because of the COVID-19 pandemic.

As of June 2021, he held every single Hops offensive record. In 2021, Yerzy played with the Single-A Visalia Rawhide (12 games), Hillsboro (61 games), and the Double-A Amarillo Sod Poodles (21 games). On May 21, 2021, Yerzy was named Canadian Baseball Network Player of the Week. On August 27, he was named Canadian Baseball Network Player of the Week. He batted a combined .220/.354/.459 in 318 at-bats, with 21 home runs, 61 RBI, 53 walks, 14 hit by pitches, and 7 stolen bases in 8 attempts. In the field, he played catcher (45 games; throwing out 33% of attempted base-stealers) and first base (24 games).

In 2022, Yerzy played the entire season with Amarillo. He batted .220/.338/.402 in 291 at-bats, with 45 runs, 12 home runs, 38 RBI, and 50 walks. In the field, he played first base (48 games) and catcher (31 games), and pitched one scoreless inning in one game. He elected free agency following the season on November 10, 2022.

=== Cincinnati Reds ===
On March 10, 2023, Yerzy signed a minor league contract with the Cincinnati Reds organization. In 17 games split between the Double–A Chattanooga Lookouts and Triple–A Louisville Bats, he hit a combined .235/.371/.529 with 11 runs, 4 home runs, and 14 RBIs in 51 at bats. On August 15, Yerzy was released by Cincinnati.

=== Kansas City Monarchs ===
On August 23, 2023, Yerzy signed with the Kansas City Monarchs of the American Association of Professional Baseball. In 12 games for the Monarchs, Yerzy batted .286/.457/.429 with one home run, four RBI, and 11 walks in 35 at-bats.

=== Milwaukee Brewers ===
On February 2, 2024, Yerzy signed a minor league contract with the Milwaukee Brewers. He was assigned to the Biloxi Shuckers, the Brewers' Double-A affiliate in Biloxi, Mississippi. In 23 games split between Biloxi and the Triple-A Nashville Sounds, Yerzy batted .208/.275/.306 with two home runs and 14 RBI. He elected free agency following the season on November 4.

=== Cincinnati Reds (second stint) ===
On January 20, 2025, Yerzy signed a minor league contract with the Cincinnati Reds. In two games for the Double-A Chattanooga Lookouts, he went 1-for-6 (.167) with one walk. Yerzy was released by the Reds organization on April 14.

=== St. Louis Cardinals ===
On April 16, 2025, Yerzy signed a minor league contract with the St. Louis Cardinals. In 39 games with Triple-A Memphis Redbirds he batted .144/.239/.220 with 2 home runs and 9 RBIs. He elected free agency on November 2.

== International career ==
Yerzy was selected to the Canada national baseball team at the 2015 U-18 Baseball World Cup and 2019 Pan American Games Qualifier, and the 2019 WBSC Premier12.

== See also ==
- List of select Jewish baseball players
