= Eric Bach (sportscaster) =

American sportscaster

- Education: Michigan State University
- Sports commentary career
- Team: Amarillo Sod Poodles
- Genre: Play-by-play
- Sport: Baseball

Eric Bach (born 1998 or 1999) is an American baseball sportscaster, currently the play-by-play caller for the Amarillo Sod Poodles.

== Career ==
After playing football in high school, Bach began sportscasting while attending Michigan State University. In 2023, Bach became the play-by-play caller for the Fredericksburg Nationals, and the next year was named the 2024 Carolina League Broadcaster of the Year. Bach made his Major League Baseball debut in 2025 when he called a radio broadcast for the Washington Nationals in a September series against the Atlanta Braves. In 2026, Bach left the Fredrickburg Nationals and became a broadcaster for the Amarillo Sod Poodles.

== Personal life ==
Bach is from Coldwater, Michigan and attended Coldwater High School and Michigan State University.

Bach came out publicly as gay in 2019. As of 2023, Bach was the only openly gay sportscaster in Minor League Baseball.
