= Nate Savino =

American baseball player (born 2002)

Arizona Diamondbacks
- Pitcher
- Born: January 24, 2002 (age 24); Sterling, Virginia, U.S.
- Bats: Left Throws: Left

Nathaniel Knowles Savino (born January 24, 2002) is an American professional baseball pitcher in the Arizona Diamondbacks organization.

== Amateur career ==
Savino attended Potomac Falls High School in Sterling, Virginia. In 2019, he batted .375 and pitched to a 0.60 ERA and was named the Gatorade Virginia Baseball Player of the Year. That summer, he played in the Under Armour All-America Baseball Game at Wrigley Field and the Perfect Game All-American Classic at Petco Park. He graduated from Potomac Falls early in December 2019 and then enrolled at the University of Virginia to play college baseball.

In 2020, Savino's freshman year at Virginia, he pitched 9 1/3 innings in which he compiled a 1.93 ERA before remainder of the season was cancelled due to the COVID-19 pandemic. In 2021, Savino appeared in 16 games (ten starts) in which he went 3–3 with a 3.79 ERA and 34 strikeouts over 54 2/3 innings. Following the season's end, he was named to the USA Baseball Collegiate National Team. Savino entered the 2022 season as Virginia's number two starter, and was named the ACC Pitcher of the Week on March 14 after throwing a complete-game shutout versus Duke University. He finished the season having started 15 games with a 6–6 record, a 3.69 ERA, and 79 strikeouts over 78 innings.

== Professional career ==
Savino was drafted by the Arizona Diamondbacks in the third round with the 82nd overall selection of the 2022 Major League Baseball draft. He signed with the team for $700,000.

Savino underwent shoulder surgery prior to the 2023 season, forcing him to miss the whole season. He made his professional debut in 2024 on a rehab assignment with the Arizona Complex League Diamondbacks before he was assigned to the Visalia Rawhide. Over twenty games (18 starts), Savino went 0–5 with a 7.15 ERA, 34 walks, and 51 strikeouts over 45 1/3 innings. He returned to Visalia to open the 2025 season, in a relief role, and was promoted to the Hillsboro Hops in late April. Savino was promoted once again to the Amarillo Sod Poodles in early July. Over 37 relief appearances between the three clubs, he went 5–1 with a 4.93 ERA and 65 strikeouts over 73 innings. In 2026, Savino made 31 relief appearances between Hillsboro and Amarillo and had a 5–4 record, a 5.97 ERA, and 49 strikeouts over 57 1/3 innings.
