= Mark Reed (baseball) =

American baseball player

- Catcher / Bullpen Catcher
- Born: April 13, 1986 (age 40); Upland, California, U.S.
- Bats: Left Throws: Right
- Stats at Baseball Reference

Teams
- As Coach: Arizona Diamondbacks (2011–2019)

Mark Garland Reed (born April 13, 1986) is an American former professional baseball player and a current head coach for the Hillsboro Hops, the High-A affiliate of the Arizona Diamondbacks. He and his longtime girlfriend, Lauren Price, split their time between Arizona and California.

== Career ==
Reed was originally drafted in the third round (96th overall) in the 2004 MLB draft by the Chicago Cubs out of Bonita High School. Scouts originally compared Reed to Mike Lieberthal. Reed used an open stance and an aggressive approach at plate, which, when combined with his quick bat, led to hard contact. His older brother, Jeremy Reed, played in the Chicago White Sox organization. After the 2011 season, Reed decided to test the minor league free agent market and joined the Diamondbacks A-Ball affiliate. A hand injury and crowded depth chart at the catcher position slowed things down once again. After an injury to Jeff Motuzas, the Diamondbacks’ longtime bullpen catcher, Reed was called up to serve as the Diamondbacks' bullpen catcher.

Reed began working as a hitting coach for the Hillsboro Hops in 2020. He was promoted to the Reno Aces' coaching staff in 2022. In 2024, Reed rejoined the Hillsboro Hops, this time as the Bench Coach. In 2026, he was promoted to be the manager for the Hops.

Reed also served as the bullpen catcher for the 2013 and 2017 World Baseball Classic tournaments.
