= Hillsboro Hops =

- Founded in 2013; Hillsboro, Oregon
Team logo
Cap insignia

Minor league affiliations
- Class: High-A (2021–present)
- Previous classes: Class A Short Season (2013–2020)
- League: Northwest League (2013–present)

Major league affiliations
- Team: Arizona Diamondbacks (2013–present)

Minor league titles
- League titles (3): 2014; 2015; 2019
- Division titles (3): 2014; 2015; 2019

Team data
- Colors: Navy blue, green, light blue, white
- Mascot: Barley
- Ballpark: Hillsboro Hops Ballpark (2026–present)
- Previous parks: Hillsboro Ballpark (2013–2025)
- Owner(s)/ Operator(s): Short Season, LLC
- General manager: K.L. Wombacher
- Manager: Mark Reed
- Website: milb.com/hillsboro

The Hillsboro Hops are a Minor League Baseball team in the northwest United States, located in Hillsboro, Oregon, a city in the Portland metropolitan area. The Hops are members of the Northwest League and are the High-A affiliate of the Arizona Diamondbacks. As of 2026, they play their games at Hillsboro Hops Ballpark, a new stadium directly across the street from their former home, Hillsboro Ballpark (Ron Tonkin Field).

== History ==
As early as 2011, the Yakima Bears, a team of the Northwest League in Yakima, Washington, started exploring options to relocate after a lack of progress on a new ballpark to replace their below-standard Yakima County Stadium and escape a declining local economy. Following a failed proposal to move to Vancouver, Washington, the team received an offer to move to Hillsboro, Oregon, in June 2012, with plans to start play in 2013. The city and team reached a deal, with city council approval on June 5, and approval by the league and franchise on June 8. The city signed the agreement with the team on June 26, with approval by Major League Baseball coming in August. Groundbreaking for a new 4,500-seat stadium took place on September 21, and the team's name, Hillsboro Hops, was announced on October 16. The Hops replaced the Triple-A Portland Beavers of the Pacific Coast League, which relocated to Tucson at the end of the 2010 season. The Portland area went without minor league baseball in 2011 and 2012.

The Hillsboro Hops' first game was played on the road against the Salem-Keizer Volcanoes on June 14, 2013, a 3–2 loss. Ryan Gebhardt had the team's first hit and Brian Billigen earned the first RBI. Their first win came on June 17 in the Hillsboro Ballpark home opener against the Eugene Emeralds. The inaugural home opener was attended by a sellout 4,710 fans, who watched Jordan Parr hit the first home run in the Hops' history.

Barley, the team's mascot, was introduced on June 28, 2013. The Hops set the franchise attendance record in 2014, when their games were attended by 138,732 people. They also won their division and the league championship. The team was managed by J. R. House, whose coaching staff included fellow-former major leaguers Doug Drabek and Mark Grace. Hillsboro swept the championship series against the three-time NWL defending champion Vancouver Canadians. The team set another franchise attendance record in 2015 with 143,412 (an average of 3,774 for 38 dates) while winning a second consecutive league title.

The Hops hosted the NWL All-Star Game in 2017.

On August 28, 2019, the Hops clinched a playoff berth for the sixth straight season breaking the Northwest League record previously held by Vancouver at five straight seasons. They faced the Salem-Keizer Volcanoes in the divisional round, where they won the series 2–0, and advanced to Northwest League finals for the first time since 2015. In Game 1, Hillsboro entered the bottom of the ninth inning trailing 3–1 but put up four runs in the inning including a walk-off 3-run home run by Andy Yerzy. The Hops were defeated in Game 2, losing 9–1, but bounced back in Game 3 with a two-run ninth-inning rally to snag the win. The Hops were shut out in Game 4, losing 6–0. Then in Game 5, Hillsboro captured their third NWL title, and their first since 2015, winning the series 3–2.

Due to the COVID-19 pandemic, the Minor League Baseball season was cancelled. In conjunction with Major League Baseball's restructuring of Minor League Baseball in 2021, the Hops were organized into the High-A West along with five other teams previously of the Northwest League. They continued as the High-A affiliate of the Diamondbacks. In 2022, the High-A West became known as the Northwest League, the name historically used by the regional circuit prior to the 2021 reorganization.

In January 2023, it was announced that Veronica Gajownik had been hired to manage the Hops, which made her the first woman to manage a minor league Class High-A baseball team, and the first openly LGBTQ manager in minor or major league baseball history.

The team competes as the "Sonadores de Hillsboro" as part of minor league baseball's "Copa de Diversion" program.

== Season-by-season records ==
=== Northwest League (2013–present) ===
Season	PDC	Division	Finish	Wins	Losses	Win%	Postseason	Manager	Attendance
Hillsboro Hops
2013	ARI	South	3rd	34	42	.447	—	Audo Vicente	135,167
2014	ARI	South	1st	48	28	.632	Defeated Boise in division series 2–1; Defeated Vancouver in championship series 2–1	J. R. House	138,732
2015	ARI	South	1st	45	31	.592	Defeated Salem-Keizer in division series 2–1; Defeated Tri-City in championship series 2–1	Shelley Duncan	143,412
2016	ARI	South	2nd	42	33	.560	Lost to Eugene in division series 2–1	Shelley Duncan	131,851
2017	ARI	South	1st	41	35	.539	Lost to Eugene in division series 2–0	Shawn Roof	128,416
2018	ARI	South	1st	51	25	.671	Lost to Eugene in division series 2–0	Shawn Roof	130,286
2019	ARI	South	1st	48	28	.632	Defeated Salem-Keizer in division series 2–0; Defeated Tri-City in championship series 3–2	Javier Colina	133,605
2021	ARI	West	4th	52	60	.464	—	Vince Harrison	110,384
2022	ARI	N/A	4th	60	70	.462	—	Vince Harrison	150,792
2023	ARI	N/A	6th	56	76	.424	—	Veronica Gajownik	158,723
2024	ARI	N/A	3rd	69	62	.527	—	Javier Colina	153,571
2025	ARI	N/A	4th	60	71	.458	—	Mark Reed	174,777

- The 2020 season was cancelled due to the COVID-19 pandemic.

Division winner	League champions

== Ballpark ==
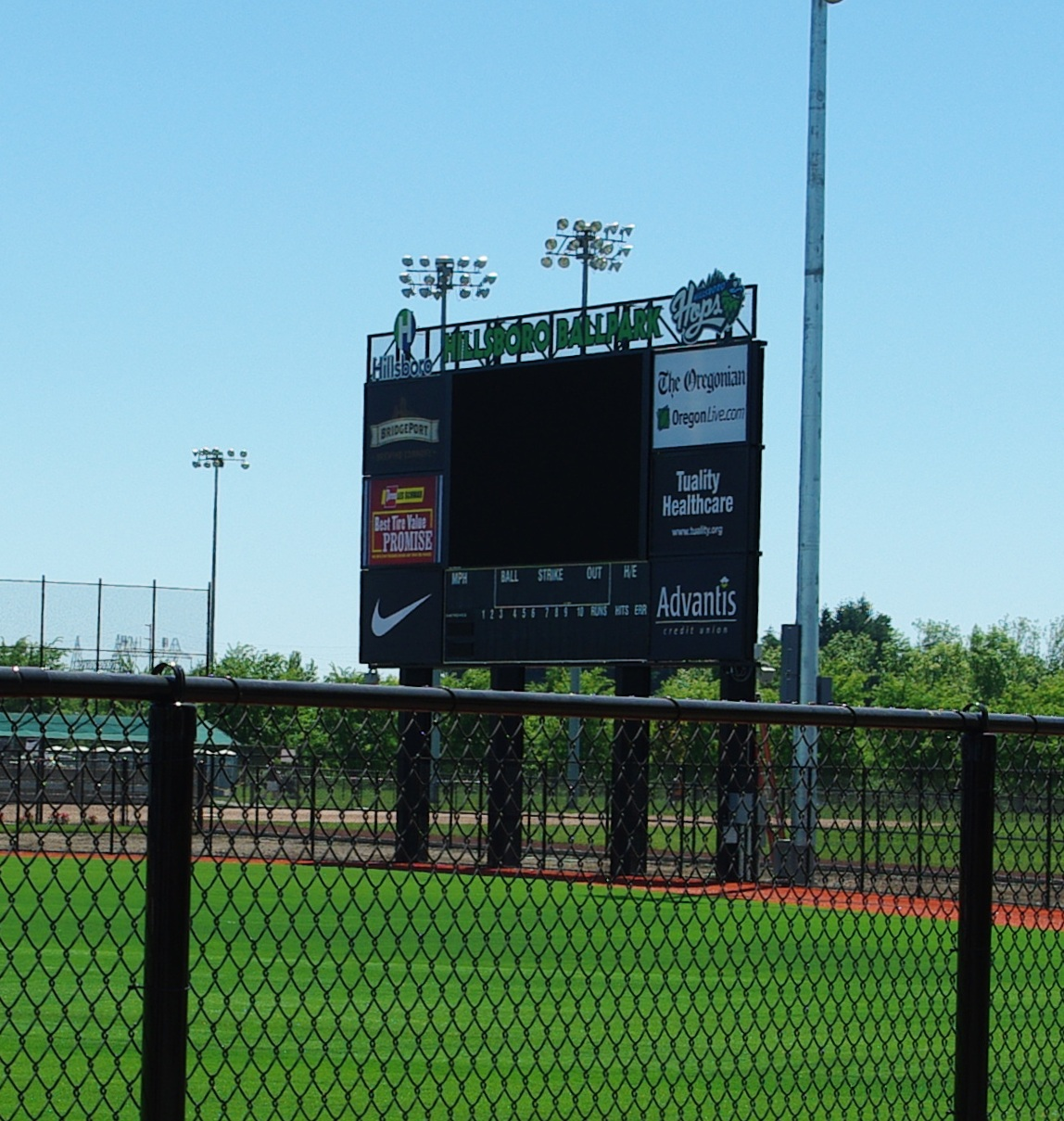
Hillsboro Ballpark scoreboard

The Hops played their home games at Hillsboro Ballpark until 2025. A new state of art facility opened next door, named Hillsboro Hops Ballpark in 2026.

== Radio ==
Rich Burk was signed as the team's radio announcer on KPOJ (620 AM).

== Roster ==
Hillsboro Hops roster
Players		Coaches/Other
Pitchers: 2 Kyle Ayers; 21 Rio Britton; 1 Junior Ciprian; 17 Luke Craig; 18 Luke Dotson; -- Jake Fitzgibbons; 20 Patrick Forbes; 23 Joangel Gonzalez; 31 Caden Grice; 12 Alexis Liebano; 12 Dean Livingston; 36 Augie Mojica; 19 Tayler Montiel; 33 Rocco Reid; 38 Nate Savino; 34 Jacob Steinmetz	Catchers: 29 Alberto Barriga; 13 Kenny Castillo; 28 Adrian De Leon; 25 Ivan Luciano; Infielders: 32 Diosfran Cabeza; 5 Wallace Clark; 22 Kayson Cunningham; 19 Abdias De La Cruz; 14 J. D. Dix; 26 Chris Katz; 9 Modeifi Marte; 4 José Mejía; 35 Yerald Nin; 16 Adrian Rodriguez; Outfielders: 35 Jose Alpuria; 3 Slade Caldwell; 8 Brady Counsell; 29 Jakey Josepha	Manager: 7 Mark Reed; Coaches: 30 James Adduci (assistant hitting); 43 Blake Nation (pitching); 0 Gift Ngoepe (bench); 7-day injured list; * On Arizona Diamondbacks 40-man roster; ~ Development list; # Rehab assignment; ∞ Reserve list; ‡ Restricted list; § Suspended list; † Temporarily inactive list; Roster updated November 2, 2026; Transactions; → More rosters: MiLB • Northwest League; → Arizona Diamondbacks minor league players

== Branding ==
The team name is a reference to the plant used in beer brewing (Oregon is the second-largest hop-producing US state by volume), as well as to various baseball terms such as the short hop, bad hop, and crow hop. No previous professional or collegiate sports team has ever been called the "Hops". The team's logo includes a hop cone wearing a baseball hat, evergreen trees, and Mount Hood. Team colors are green, navy blue, and light blue. The Hops' mascot is Barley, who is green with a blue baseball cap. (Barley is another plant used in beer brewing.) The team's branding and logo was named by Ballpark Digest as the best in Minor League Baseball for 2013.

== Sponsorships ==
In March 2013, the team announced a three-year deal with BridgePort Brewing Company to be the official beer of the Hops. Advantis Credit Union, Les Schwab Tires, Nike, Tuality Healthcare, and The Oregonian were the founding sponsors.

== Notable alumni ==
- Sergio Alcántara, infielder
- Corbin Carroll, outfielder
- Jhoan Durán, pitcher
- Jake McCarthy, outfielder
- Geraldo Perdomo, infielder
- Dansby Swanson, infielder
- Daulton Varsho, outfielder and catcher

== Minor league affiliations ==
Class	Team	League	Location	Ballpark	Affiliated
Triple-A	Reno Aces	Pacific Coast League	Reno, Nevada	Greater Nevada Field	2009
Double-A	Amarillo Sod Poodles	Texas League	Amarillo, Texas	Hodgetown	2021
High-A	Hillsboro Hops	Northwest League	Hillsboro, Oregon	Hillsboro Hops Ballpark	2013
Single-A	Visalia Rawhide	California League	Visalia, California	Valley Strong Ballpark	2007
Rookie	ACL D-backs	Arizona Complex League	Scottsdale, Arizona	Salt River Fields at Talking Stick	2024
Rookie	DSL Arizona Black	Dominican Summer League	Boca Chica, Santo Domingo	Baseball City Complex	2016
Rookie	DSL Arizona Red	Dominican Summer League	Boca Chica, Santo Domingo	Baseball City Complex	2016

Preceded by Yakima Bears	Northwest League franchise 2013–present	Succeeded by
