= Hillsboro Hops Ballpark =

Baseball stadium in Hillsboro, Oregon

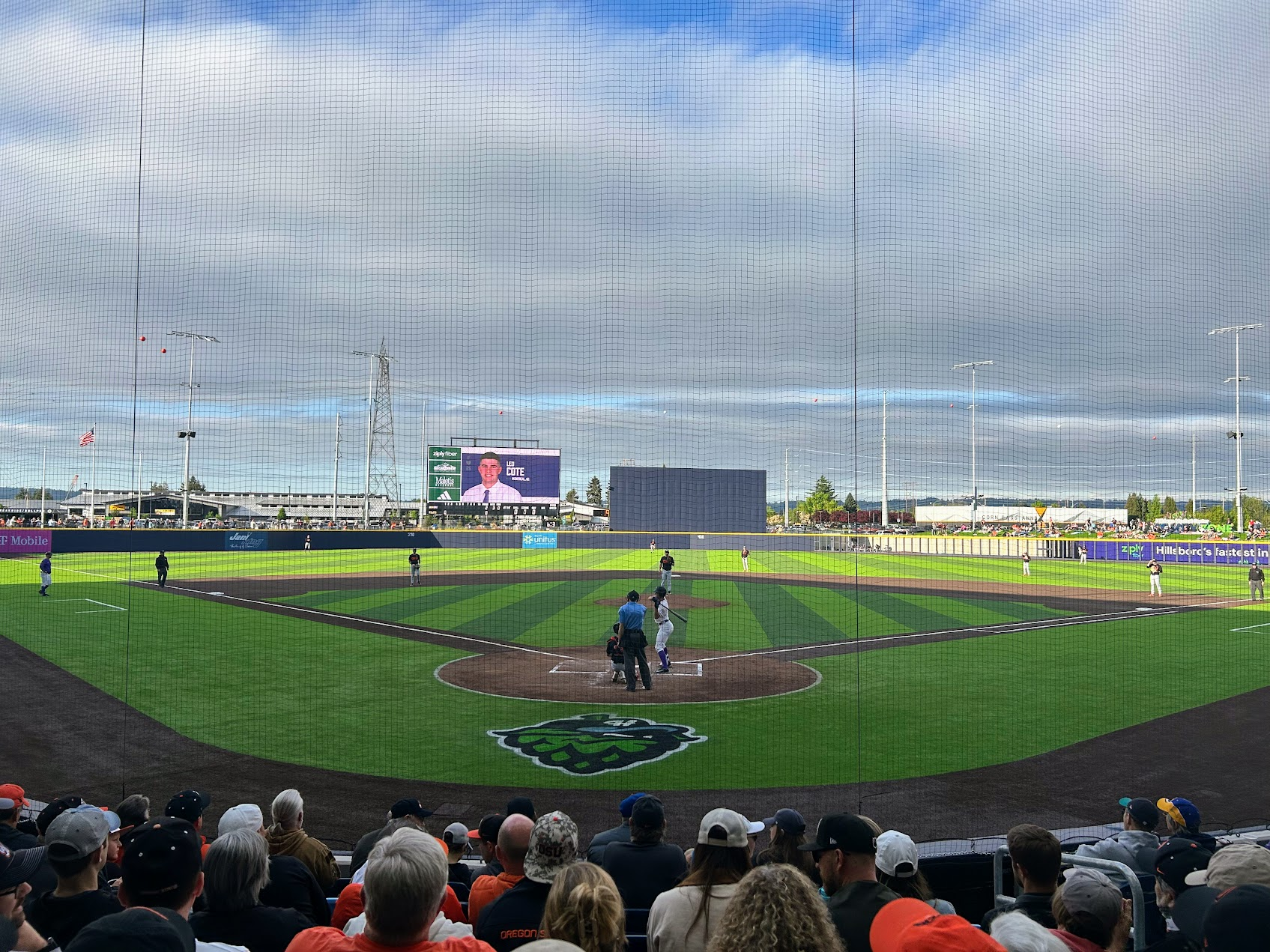
- Hillsboro Hops Ballpark field from behind home plate
- Interactive map of Hillsboro Hops Ballpark
- Location: 4530 NE Century Blvd Hillsboro, OR 97124
- Coordinates: 45°33′19″N 122°54′34″W
- Owner: City of Hillsboro
- Operator: Hillsboro Hops
- Capacity: ~6,000 (baseball)
- Surface: Pivot® performance turf

Construction
- Groundbreaking: August 8, 2024
- Opened: April 7, 2026
- Cost: $153 million
- Architects: SRG Partnership, CannonDesign, Populous
- Structural engineer: KPFF Consulting Engineers
- General contractor: Mortenson Construction

Tenant
- Hillsboro Hops (NWL) (2026–present)

Hillsboro Hops Ballpark is a baseball stadium in Hillsboro, Oregon, United States. Opened in 2026, it is the home of the Hillsboro Hops of the Northwest League, the High-A affiliate of the Arizona Diamondbacks. The ballpark is located at the Gordon Faber Recreation Complex, adjacent to the team's former home, Hillsboro Ballpark.

== History ==
The new ballpark was developed after Major League Baseball implemented updated facility standards for minor league teams, placing pressure on the Hillsboro Hops to upgrade or replace their existing stadium to avoid the possibility of relocation.

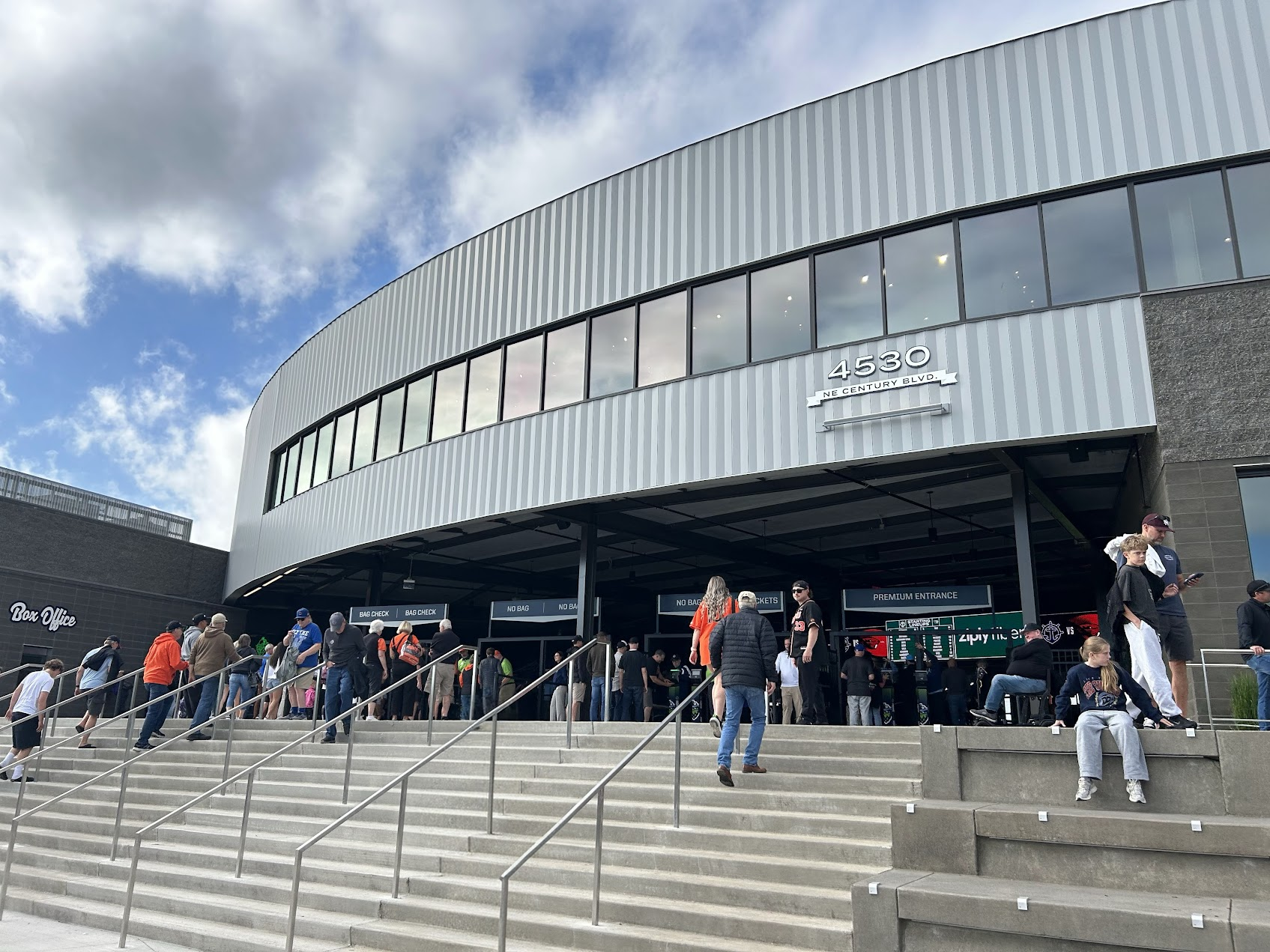
Fans entering Hillsboro Hops Ballpark before an Oregon State vs Portland baseball game in Hillsboro, Oregon.

Construction began in 2024 and reached substantial completion in early 2026 ahead of the Minor League Baseball season. The project was funded through a combination of public and private investment, including approximately $41 million in public funding and $112 million in private contributions, for a total cost estimated at $153 million.

The Hops played their final game at Hillsboro Ballpark in August 2025 before transitioning to the new stadium. The new ballpark hosted its first regular season home game in April 2026.

== Design and features ==
The ballpark seats approximately 6,000 spectators for baseball games and can accommodate up to 7,000 for concerts and other events. It was designed as a multipurpose venue capable of hosting community events, concerts, and other entertainment programming in addition to baseball.

The facility includes upgraded player amenities such as larger locker rooms, training facilities, batting cages, and strength and conditioning areas designed to meet Major League Baseball standards.

The playing surface is composed of Pivot performance turf, a synthetic system manufactured by TenCate, and is the first installation of its kind in a Minor League Baseball ballpark in the United States.

The stadium is owned by the City of Hillsboro and operated by the Hillsboro Hops under a long-term lease agreement.

== Naming rights ==
The team's previous naming rights agreement for Hillsboro Ballpark expired prior to the move to the new stadium, ending a decade-long partnership. As of its opening in 2026, the new ballpark has been referred to generically as Hillsboro Hops Ballpark pending a new naming rights agreement.

== Impact ==
The construction of the new ballpark ensured the continued presence of Minor League Baseball in Hillsboro following Major League Baseball's restructuring of the minor leagues in the early 2020s. The project reflects broader efforts across Minor League Baseball to modernize facilities and improve player development environments.

In addition to serving as a baseball venue, the stadium is intended to function as a regional entertainment hub, hosting concerts and community events.
