= Patrick Forbes (baseball) =

American baseball player (born 2004)

Arizona Diamondbacks
- Pitcher
- Born: July 11, 2004 (age 22); Bowling Green, Kentucky, U.S.
- Bats: Right Throws: Right
- Stats at Baseball Reference

Patrick Forbes (born July 11, 2004) is an American professional baseball pitcher in the Arizona Diamondbacks organization.

== Amateur career ==
Forbes attended Bowling Green High School in Bowling Green, Kentucky, where he played baseball. As a senior in 2022, he batted .563 with 15 home runs alongside pitching to a 2.36 ERA and was named Kentucky Mr. Baseball.

After graduating in 2022, Forbes enrolled at the University of Louisville to play college baseball for the Louisville Cardinals. As a two-way player his freshman year in 2023, Forbes had over 100 plate appearances batting while he appeared sparingly as a pitcher throwing 9 1/3 innings. That summer, he played in the Cape Cod Baseball League with the Brewster Whitecaps and was named a Cape Cod Summer League All-Star. As a sophomore at Louisville in 2024, Forbes broke his hand while batting versus Wake Forest and made the transition to pitching-only due to the injury. Forbes went 0–1 with a 3.72 ERA over 29 innings. After his sophomore season, he returned to Cape Cod to play for Brewster and was also one of 28 sophomores named to the USA Baseball Collegiate National Team where he was named Game 1 starter in a 5-game series with Chinese Taipei. In his junior season in 2025, Forbes moved into Louisville's starting rotation and was named the team's opening night starter. He made 15 starts for the Cardinals and went 4–2 with a 4.42 ERA and 117 strikeouts over 71 1/3 innings while finishing third in the country and best in the Atlantic Coast Conference at 14.76 k's/9 innings. In that 2025 season, Louisville made the College World Series and Forbes went 2–0 with a 3.18 ERA and 32 strikeouts across 17 innings in three NCAA tournament starts to help the Cardinals reach Omaha.

== Professional career ==
Forbes was selected in the first round by the Arizona Diamondbacks with the 29th overall pick of the 2025 Major League Baseball draft. Forbes signed with Arizona for a $3 million bonus on July 20, 2025.

To open the 2026 season, Forbes was placed on the injured list with a flexor injury. He made his professional debut in late May on a rehab assignment with the Rookie-level Arizona Complex League Diamondbacks and was then subsequently assigned to the High-A Hillsboro Hops. Forbes missed the end of June and the majority of July due to elbow discomfort. Across 10 starts with Hillsboro, he pitched to a 2.93 ERA and 38 strikeouts over 27 2/3 innings. After the season, Forbes was assigned to play in the Arizona Fall League with the Salt River Rafters.
