= J. R. House =

American baseball player & coach (born 1979)

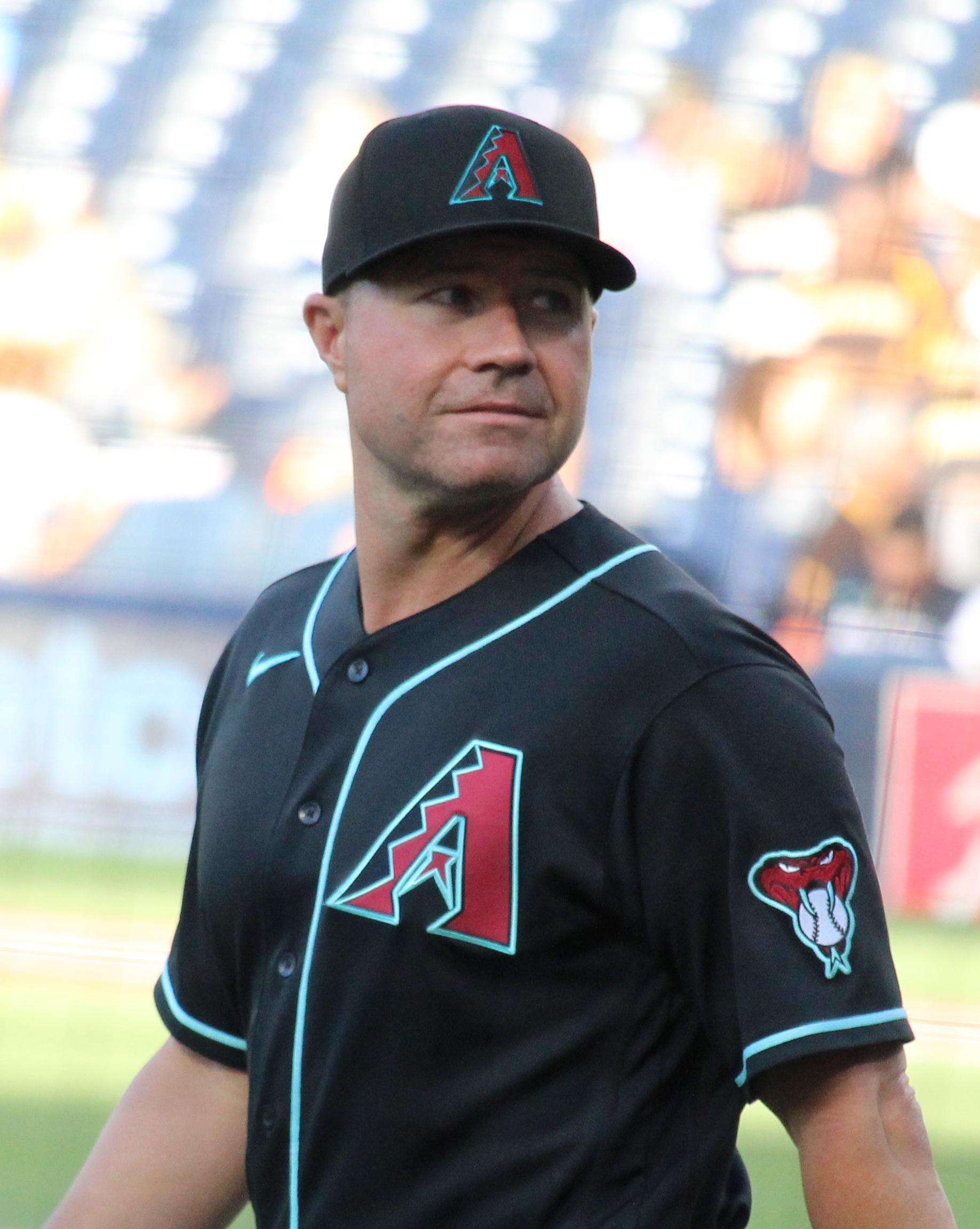
- House with the Arizona Diamondbacks in 2026

Arizona Diamondbacks – No. 71
- Catcher / Coach
- Born: November 11, 1979 (age 46); Charleston, West Virginia, U.S.
- Batted: Right Threw: Right

MLB debut
- September 27, 2003, for the Pittsburgh Pirates

Last MLB appearance
- August 19, 2008, for the Houston Astros

MLB statistics
- Batting average: .167
- Home runs: 3
- Runs batted in: 4
- Stats at Baseball Reference

Teams
- As player: Pittsburgh Pirates (2003–2004); Houston Astros (2006); Baltimore Orioles (2007); Houston Astros (2008); As coach: Cincinnati Reds (2019–2025); Arizona Diamondbacks (2026–present)

James Rodger House (born November 11, 1979) is an American former professional baseball catcher and current third base coach for the Arizona Diamondbacks of Major League Baseball (MLB). He played in MLB for the Pittsburgh Pirates, Houston Astros, and Baltimore Orioles.

A two-sport star in baseball and football in high school, House pursued a professional baseball career after being selected by the Pirates in the 5th round of the 1999 Major League Baseball draft. House left baseball for one year in 2005 to try college football. He enrolled at West Virginia University and made the team as a backup quarterback, but returned to professional baseball after playing sparingly for the Mountaineers.

== Early life ==
A top high school football player at Nitro, J.R. House set a national high school record with 10 touchdown passes in the 1998 West Virginia state championship game against Morgantown. He was the West Virginia high school football player of the year and also set a national record with 14,457 career passing yards. House is now fourth all-time behind Maty Mauk (18,932), Maty's older brother Ben Mauk (17,364) and Chris Leak (15,593). During his high school years, he spent fall semesters playing football at Nitro and spring semesters playing baseball at Seabreeze High School in Ormond Beach, Florida; he moved each winter with his father, who owned businesses in the Charleston and Daytona Beach areas.

As of 2018, J.R. House holds numerous West Virginia high school football records, including total offensive yards in a career, single-season passing yards, and career touchdown passes.

== Playing career ==
=== Pittsburgh Pirates ===
House got his pro career off to a good start by hitting over .300 combined in the rookie-level and Low-A in 1999. In 2000, he batted .348 with 23 homers, sharing the South Atlantic League MVP with Josh Hamilton.

House was plagued by illness and injuries during his time in the Pittsburgh Pirates' organization. He missed a month of the 2000 season due to mononucleosis. In 2001, House was twice on the disabled list with bruised ribs. A year later, he had surgery three times - for an abdominal hernia, a torn muscle and Tommy John surgery. House was limited to 35 games in 2002 and 41 in 2003.

Despite the missed playing time in 2003, House made his major league debut by appearing in one late-season game for Pittsburgh. After batting .288 in 92 Triple-A games in 2004, he made it back to the big leagues, getting into five games for the Pirates.

After his sixth season in the Pirates' organization, House was not deemed a top prospect anymore by the Pirates, who had high hopes for other young catchers Ryan Doumit, Humberto Cota, Ronny Paulino, and Neil Walker. Additionally, his throwing ability was limited in 2004 by an injured right arm, requiring rotator cuff surgery. House was subsequently released by the Pirates.

=== College football ===
After his baseball career apparently ended, House enrolled at West Virginia University, where he was the third-string quarterback for one season. In 2005, House completed 2-of-4 passes for 38 yards with no touchdowns or interceptions. He also had 2 rushes for 16 yards with a long of 13 yards and no touchdowns.

=== Houston Astros ===
Deciding to return to baseball in 2006, House signed with the Houston Astros. Assigned to their Corpus Christi Hooks Double-A minor league affiliate, he had two hitting streaks of over 15 games in the first two months of the year and by June 3 was leading the Texas League in batting average.

Soon thereafter, House moved up to the Triple-A Round Rock Express. On August 21, 2006, he played his last game with Round Rock and was called up to the majors. House saw action in four games for the Astros, going hitless in nine at-bats.

=== Baltimore Orioles ===
On November 14, 2006, House was signed by the Baltimore Orioles. House played for the Norfolk Tides, their Triple-A affiliate, for the first three months of the 2007 baseball season. House was recalled by the Orioles on August 13, 2007.

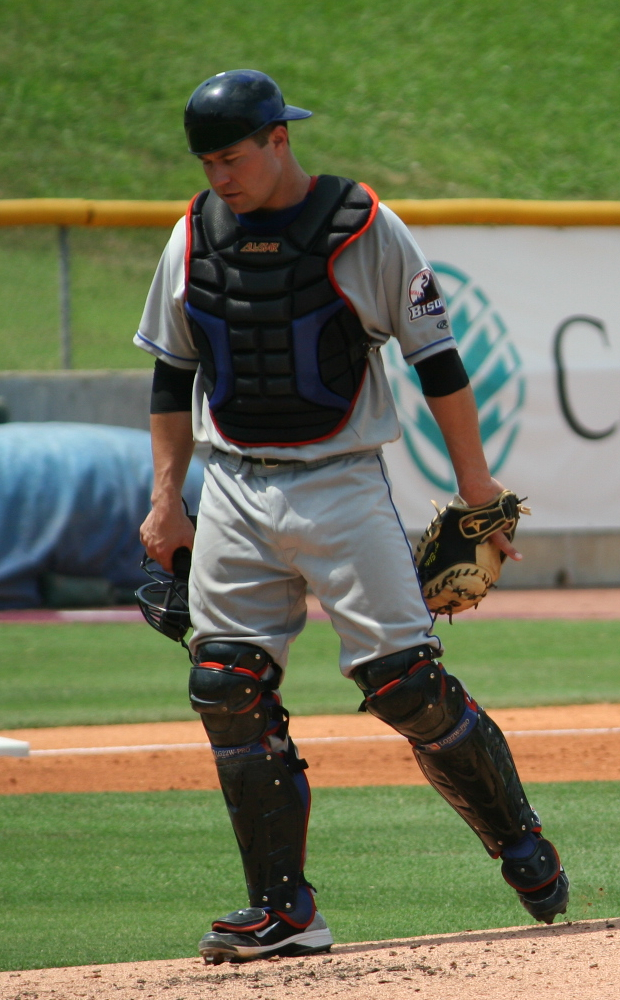
House, as catcher with the Buffalo Bisons, Triple-A affiliate of the New York Mets, in 2010

House hit his first career home run off Toronto Blue Jays starting pitcher Jesse Litsch on August 18. House saw action in 19 games with Baltimore, batting .211 with three home runs. With the conclusion of the regular season, he was removed from the 40-man roster and sent outright to Triple-A Norfolk on October 3. House declined the assignment and elected free agency on October 12.

=== Houston Astros (second stint) ===
House returned to the Houston Astros organization the next season, signing a minor league contract with an invitation to spring training on January 10, 2008. House did not make the Astros' Opening Day roster and on March 19, was sent back to the Triple-A Round Rock Express of the Pacific Coast League. He was promoted by the Astros on August 16 and appeared in three games, going hitless in three at-bats.

=== Newark Bears ===
In 2010, House started the season with the Newark Bears of the Atlantic League of Professional Baseball. In 16 appearances for the team, House slashed .345/.424/.414 with no home runs and eight RBI.

=== New York Mets ===
On May 14, 2010, House was signed to a minor league contract by the New York Mets organization. House reported to the Mets' Triple A affiliate, the Buffalo Bisons. He played in 67 games for the Bisons, batting .253 with four home runs and 29 runs batted in.

=== Long Island Ducks ===
On February 9, 2011, House signed a contract with the Long Island Ducks of the Atlantic League of Professional Baseball. In 113 appearances for Long Island, House batted .305/.365/.493 with 19 home runs and 81 RBI.

== Coaching career ==
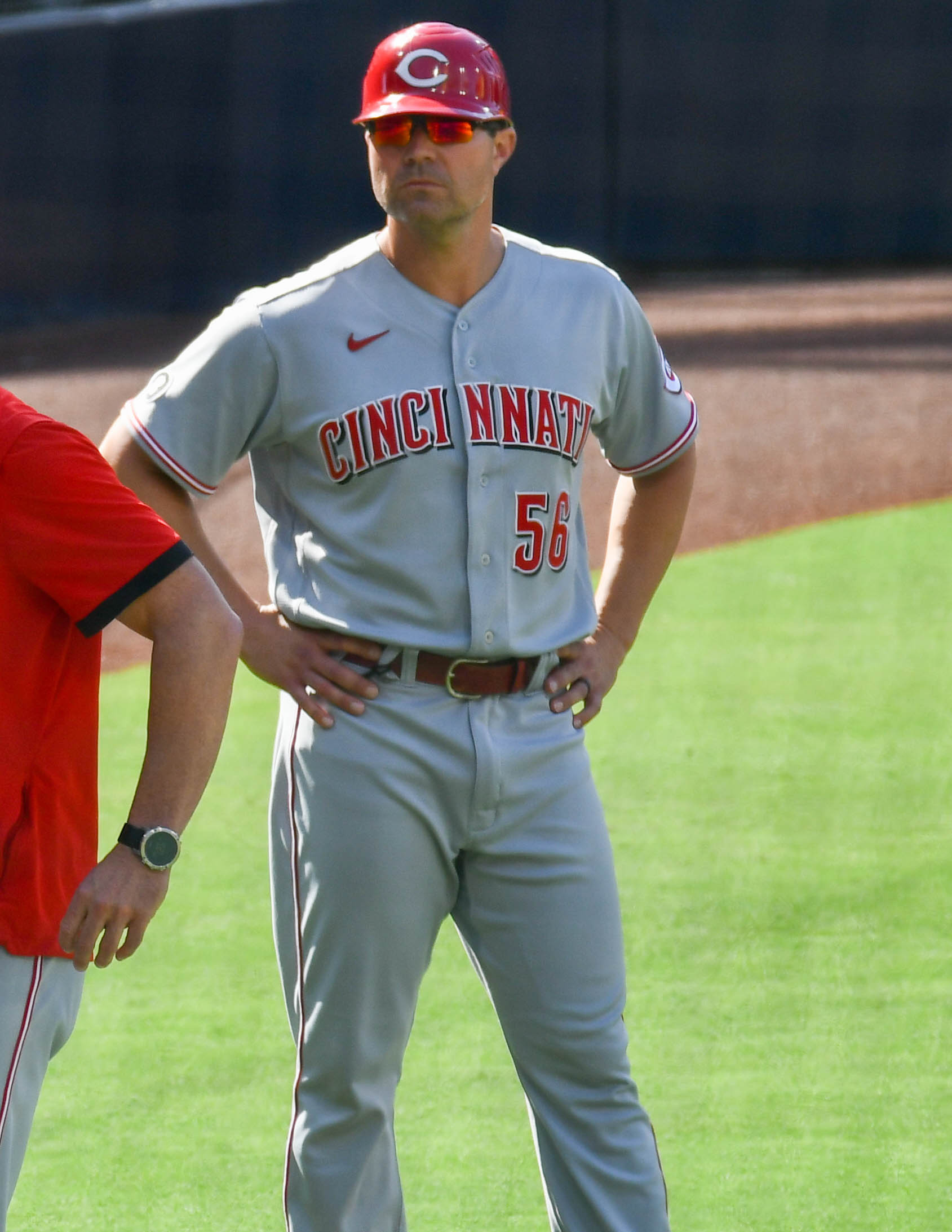
House serving as the Cincinnati Reds 3rd base coach during a game in the 2021 season

=== Arizona Diamondbacks ===
House managed the Hillsboro Hops to the Northwest League championship in 2014. House spent the 2015 and 2016 seasons with the High-A Visalia Rawhide, earning California League Manager of the Year honors in 2015. He served as the field coordinator of instruction for the Arizona Diamondbacks in 2018.

=== Cincinnati Reds ===
On January 10, 2019, the Cincinnati Reds hired House to serve as their third base coach and catching coach. He served in the role through the 2025 season.

=== Arizona Diamondbacks (second stint) ===
On October 15, 2025, the Arizona Diamondbacks hired House to serve as their third base coach.
