= Slade Caldwell =

American baseball player (born 2006)

Arizona Diamondbacks
- Outfielder
- Born: June 18, 2006 (age 20); Jonesboro, Arkansas, U.S.
- Bats: Left Throws: Left
- Stats at Baseball Reference

Slade Michael Caldwell (born on June 18, 2006) is an American professional baseball outfielder in the Arizona Diamondbacks organization.

== Amateur career ==
Caldwell was born and raised in Jonesboro, Arkansas and attended Valley View High School. He committed to play college baseball at Ole Miss during his freshman year of high school. During his sophomore year, he hit .511 with nine home runs and 48 RBI with 41 stolen bases. Caldwell was named the Arkansas Gatorade Player of the Year as a junior after batting .512 with five home runs, 31 RBI, and 40 stolen bases while also going 7–1 with a 2.31 ERA and 72 strikeouts as a pitcher. After the season, Caldwell was selected for the 2023 MLB-USA Baseball High School All-American Game at T-Mobile Park. As a senior in 2024, Caldwell hit .485 with 51 stolen bases, helping lead Valley View to a 5A State Championship. He ended his high school career as the state's leader in career steals with 170. He was named the state Gatorade Player of the Year for the second consecutive season.

== Professional career ==
Caldwell was considered a top prospect for the 2024 Major League Baseball (MLB) draft, being ranked ninth by Perfect Game for the class of 2024. The Arizona Diamondbacks selected Caldwell was in the first round with the 29th overall selection of the 2024 MLB draft. He signed with the Diamondbacks on July 27 for $3.1 million.

Caldwell made his professional debut in 2025 with the Visalia Rawhide. In June, he was promoted to the Hillsboro Hops. He was selected to represent the Diamondbacks alongside LuJames Groover at the 2025 All-Star Futures Game at Truist Park. Over 114 games between the two teams, Caldwell hit .260 with three home runs, 38 RBI, 29 doubles, and 25 stolen bases. Caldwell returned to Hillsboro for the 2026 season. He appeared in 104 games and batted .216 with six home runs, 36 RBI, and 26 stolen bases.
