= Arizona Complex League Diamondbacks =

- (1996–2000, 2011–present); Scottsdale, Arizona; previously in Phoenix (1996–1997), Tucson (1998–2000)

Minor league affiliations
- Class: Rookie
- League: Arizona Complex League
- Division: East Division
- Previous leagues: Arizona League (1996–2000, 2011–2020)

Major league affiliations
- Team: Arizona Diamondbacks

Minor league titles
- Division titles (1): 2024

Team data
- Name: ACL Diamondbacks (2021–present)
- Previous names: AZL Diamondbacks (1998–2000, 2011–2020); Phoenix Diamondbacks (1996–1997)
- Ballpark: Salt River Fields at Talking Stick (2011–present)
- Previous parks: Tucson Electric Park (1998–2000); Phoenix Municipal Stadium (1996–1997)
- Manager: Juan Francia

The Arizona Complex League Diamondbacks are a professional baseball team competing as a Rookie-level affiliate of the Arizona Diamondbacks in the Arizona Complex League of Minor League Baseball. The team plays its home games at Salt River Fields at Talking Stick near Scottsdale, Arizona. The team is composed mainly of players who are in their first year of professional baseball either as draftees or non-drafted free agents from the United States, Canada, Dominican Republic, Venezuela, and other countries.

== History ==
While the major-league Arizona Diamondbacks began play in 1998, their rookie league team (initially known as the Phoenix Diamondbacks) first competed in the Arizona League (AZL) in 1996, in order to jump start player development, and were the first team with a Diamondbacks affiliation to begin play. They played at Scottsdale Stadium and Phoenix Municipal Stadium during 1996–1997, and at Tucson Electric Park during 1998–2000.

The Diamondbacks did not field an Arizona-based rookie league team from 2001 to 2010; the team returned to the league in 2011. Prior to the 2021 season, the Arizona League was renamed as the Arizona Complex League (ACL).

== Roster ==
Arizona Complex League Diamondbacks roster
Players	Coaches/Other
Pitchers: -- Joe Ariola; 36 Anderson Cardenas; -- Billy Corcoran; -- Brian Curley; -- Jairon Digon; -- Luke Dotson; 28 Jesus Escobar; 35 Jeury Espinal; -- Patrick Forbes; -- Raul Garayzar; -- Dean Livingston; 33 Walvin Mena; 22 Augie Mojica; -- Hayden Murphy; 10 Kelvin Rosario; -- Collin Rothermel; -- Joel Sarver; Catchers: 9 Moises Alcala; 1 Alejandro Rios; Infielders: 4 Eliesbert Alejos; 11 Titus Cissell; -- Brady Counsell; -- José Mejía; 12 Kyle Sinzza; Outfielders: 17 Pedro Blanco; 21 Pedro Catuy; -- Nathan Hall; 27 Bo Walker; 13 Gian Zapata	Manager: -- Juan Francia; Coaches: -- Ronnie Gajownik (bench); -- Tommy Murphy (hitting); 55 John Pachot (coach); 60-day injured list: -- Vitico Valdez; 7-day injured list; * On Arizona Diamondbacks 40-man roster; ~ Development list; # Rehab assignment; ∞ Reserve list; ‡ Restricted list; § Suspended list; † Temporarily inactive list; Roster updated March 26, 2026; Transactions; → More rosters: MiLB • Arizona Complex League; → Arizona Diamondbacks minor league players

== Minor league affiliations ==
Class	Team	League	Location	Ballpark	Affiliated
Triple-A	Reno Aces	Pacific Coast League	Reno, Nevada	Greater Nevada Field	2009
Double-A	Amarillo Sod Poodles	Texas League	Amarillo, Texas	Hodgetown	2021
High-A	Hillsboro Hops	Northwest League	Hillsboro, Oregon	Ron Tonkin Field	2013
Single-A	Visalia Rawhide	California League	Visalia, California	Valley Strong Ballpark	2007
Rookie	ACL D-backs	Arizona Complex League	Scottsdale, Arizona	Salt River Fields at Talking Stick	2024
Rookie	DSL Arizona Black	Dominican Summer League	Boca Chica, Santo Domingo	Baseball City Complex	2016
Rookie	DSL Arizona Red	Dominican Summer League	Boca Chica, Santo Domingo	Baseball City Complex	2016
