= Caden Grice =

American baseball player (born 2002)

Arizona Diamondbacks
- Pitcher / First baseman
- Born: June 15, 2002 (age 24); Greer, South Carolina, U.S.
- Bats: Left Throws: Left
- Stats at Baseball Reference

Career highlights and awards
- John Olerud Award (2023)

Caden Bradley Grice (born June 15, 2002) is an American professional baseball pitcher and first baseman in the Arizona Diamondbacks organization.

== Amateur career ==
Grice grew up in Greer, South Carolina and attended Riverside High School. He was named the South Carolina Gatorade Player of the Year as a senior.

Grice played both designated hitter and first base for Clemson University throughout his freshman season and began pitching as well towards the end of the season. He was named second team All-Atlantic Coast Conference (ACC) after batting .317 with 15 home runs and 53 RBIs. After the season, Grice played summer collegiate baseball for the Chatham Anglers of the Cape Cod Baseball League. He batted .244 with 12 home runs and 40 RBIs as a sophomore. Grice returned to the Chatham Anglers in the summer of 2022 and was named a league All-Star. As a junior he awarded the John Olerud Award as the nation's best two-way player after batting .307 with 18 home runs as a batter and going 8-1 with a 3.35 ERA in 16 starts as a pitcher.

== Professional career ==
Grice was selected by the Arizona Diamondbacks in the second round, with the 64th overall selection, of the 2023 Major League Baseball draft. On July 18, 2023, Grice signed with the Diamondbacks. He made his professional debut with the rookie-level Arizona Complex League Diamondbacks, hitting .273/.429/.545 with one home run, three RBI, and one stolen base.

Grice spent the 2024 season with the Single-A Visalia Rawhide, working primarily as a pitcher; in 12 appearances (11 starts), he compiled a 3-3 record and 3.75 ERA with 68 strikeouts across 50 1/3 innings pitched. On June 28, 2024, it was announced that Grice would undergo Tommy john surgery, ending his season.
