= Veronica Gajownik =

American softball and baseball player

Personal information
- Nationality: American
- Born: August 4, 1993 (age 32) Winter Park, Florida, U.S.
- Height: 5 ft 7 in (170 cm)

Sport
- College team: Indian River CC Pioneers; South Florida Bulls
Medal record
Women's baseball
Representing United States
Pan American Games
Gold medal – first place	2015 Toronto	Team competition

Veronica Rose Gajownik, also known as Ronnie Gajownik (born August 4, 1993) is a former American softball and baseball player, and an American baseball coach and manager. She was a member of the United States women's national baseball team which won a gold medal at the 2015 Pan American Games. In 2023, she was named the Hillsboro Hops’ manager for the 2023 season; this made her the first woman to manage a High-A team, and the first openly LGBTQ manager in minor or major league baseball history.

== Biography ==
Veronica Gajownik was born in Winter Park, Florida, on August 4, 1993. She is the daughter of Marcel Gajownik and Glenn Richards, a chief meteorologist for WOFL. Veronica was introduced to baseball by her father and started to play baseball with boys in Oviedo recreation leagues.

Gajownik started playing softball when she attended Paul J. Hagerty High School in Oviedo, Florida. She played for the Hagerty Huskies and has a .531 batting average as a junior with a .694 on-base percentage. She also competed in summer competitions for Team North Florida, the Tampa Mustangs and Team Florida.

Gajownik attended Indian River State College in 2013 and University of South Florida during 2014–2015 where she played softball for the South Florida Bulls.

Gajownik joined the Arizona Diamondbacks organization as a video assistant with the Hillsboro Hops, their High-A affiliate, in 2021. In 2022, Gajownik served as a coach for the Amarillo Sod Poodles of the Double-A Texas League and for the Salt River Rafters of the Arizona Fall League. In 2023 she was named Hillsboro's manager for the 2023 season; this made her the first woman to manage a High-A team, and the first openly LGBTQ manager in minor or major league baseball history. She is married to a woman. In 2024, she became the bench coach for Amarillo. In 2026, she was named bench coach of the ACL D-backs the Arizona Diamondbacks rookie-level affiliate.
