= Hillsboro Ballpark =

Baseball park in Oregon

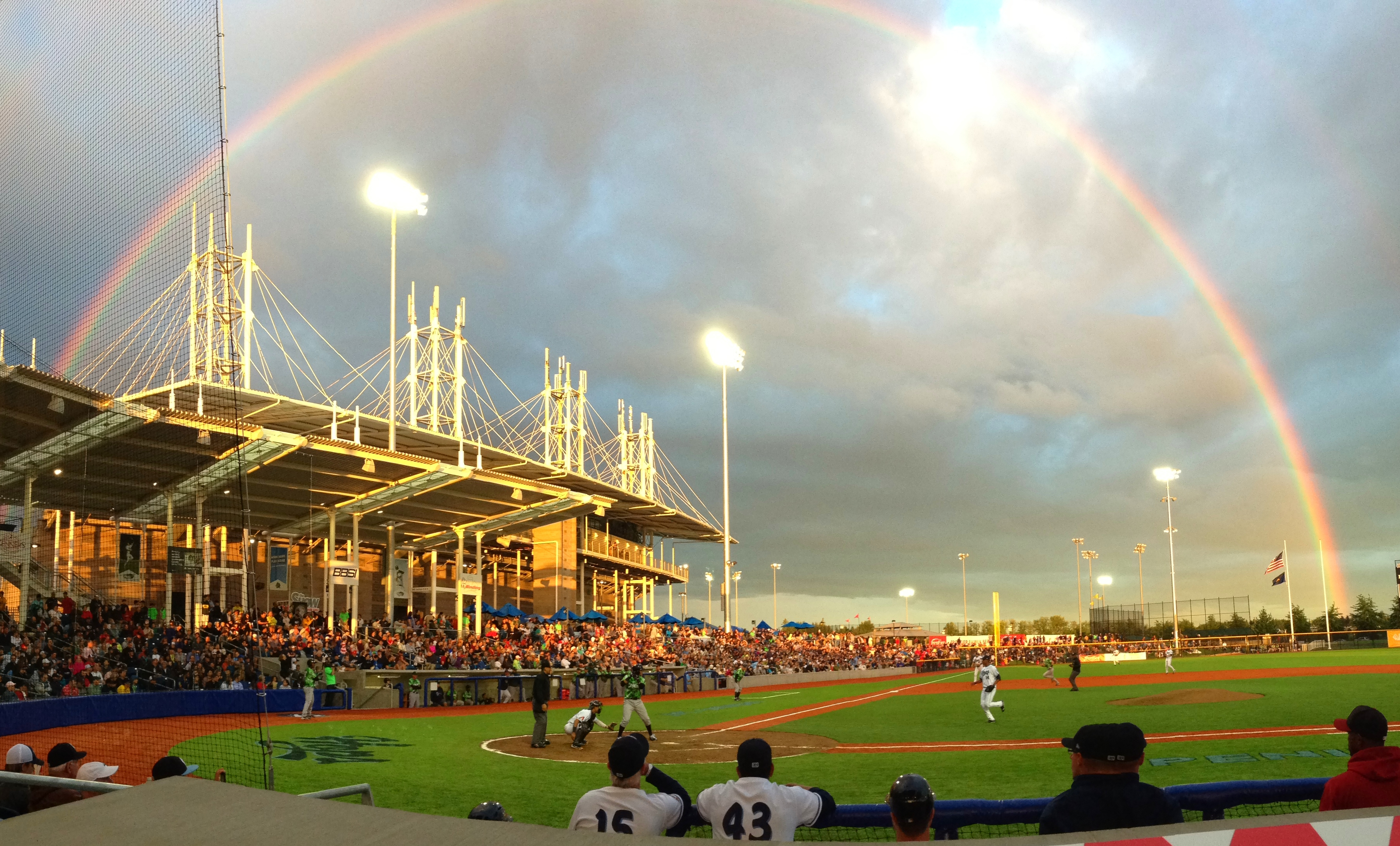
- June 2013

- Location within Oregon Location within the United States
- Interactive map of Hillsboro Ballpark
- Former names: Ron Tonkin Field (2014–2024); Hillsboro Ballpark (2013)
- Location: 4450 NE Century Blvd. (same location was formerly 4450 NW 229th Avenue); Hillsboro, Oregon
- Coordinates: 45.554°N 122.9085°W
- Owner: City of Hillsboro
- Operator: Hillsboro Parks & Recreation
- Capacity: 4,500 (3,534 seats)
- Surface: Matrix Turf
- Field size: LF: 325 ft (99 m); CF: 400 ft (122 m); RF: 325 ft (99 m)

Construction
- Groundbreaking: September 21, 2012
- Built: 2013
- Opened: June 13, 2013; June 17, 2013 (first game)
- Cost: $15.55 million ($21.4 million in 2025)
- Architects: SRG Partnership, Inc.
- Structural engineer: KPFF Consulting Engineers
- General contractor: Hoffman Construction

Tenants
- Portland Cascade (AUSL) (2026–present); Hillsboro Hops (NWL) (2013–2025); Vancouver Canadians (NWL) (2021)

Website
- hillsboro-oregon.gov

Hillsboro Ballpark, formerly Ron Tonkin Field until March 2024, is a baseball park in the northwest United States, located in Hillsboro, Oregon, a suburb west of Portland. The stadium has a capacity of 4,500 spectators (3,534 seats) and was the home for the Hillsboro Hops of the Northwest League and the Post 6 Barbers of the American Legion Oregon Zone 2 Division. Groundbreaking for the $15.55 million venue was on September 21, 2012, with the first game played nine months later on June 17, 2013.

The ballpark is adjacent to Hillsboro Stadium, a multi-sport stadium owned by the city of Hillsboro, with both stadiums located inside the city's Gordon Faber Recreation Complex. The Hops' new stadium, Hillsboro Hops Ballpark, is located next to the other venues in the complex, and opened in 2026.

== History ==
Following the Portland Beavers' exit after the 2010 season when a new ballpark was not built, minor league baseball’s Northwest League approached the city of Hillsboro about relocating a team to the city. Once the Beavers left, the Portland market was the most populous in the country without a professional baseball team. The league and city then started discussions around September 2011 about Hillsboro building a stadium in the city’s Gordon Faber Recreation Complex near Sunset Highway. The city announced in March 2012 that it was in discussions with the Northwest League to bring a Single A team to the city. Milwaukie on the eastern side of the Portland metropolitan area also had plans to build a stadium for a minor league team.

Hillsboro proposed to build a four to six-thousand-seat ballpark adjacent to Hillsboro Stadium at the Faber Complex, with plans to open for the 2013 season. Total construction budget for the new stadium was originally expected to be $15.2 million. To pay for the construction, the city would sell bonds and repay the money using revenue from the facility, including leasing the field to the minor league team. Early projections hoped to have attendance between 100,000 and 180,000 total for the 38 home games.

Although the league had two teams in mind for relocation, the Yakima Bears became the leading candidate, as the team previously failed to land a new stadium at Clark College in the Vancouver, Washington, area. The other team interested in relocation was the Boise Hawks. By April 2012, the Hillsboro City Council approved issuing a request for proposals to design and build a stadium, and hired a sports attorney to assist in the process. The new 4,500-seat stadium, to be built on field four at the complex, is planned to have covered seating, a new orientation to face east, a beer garden, an entry plaza with artwork, and more concession stands.

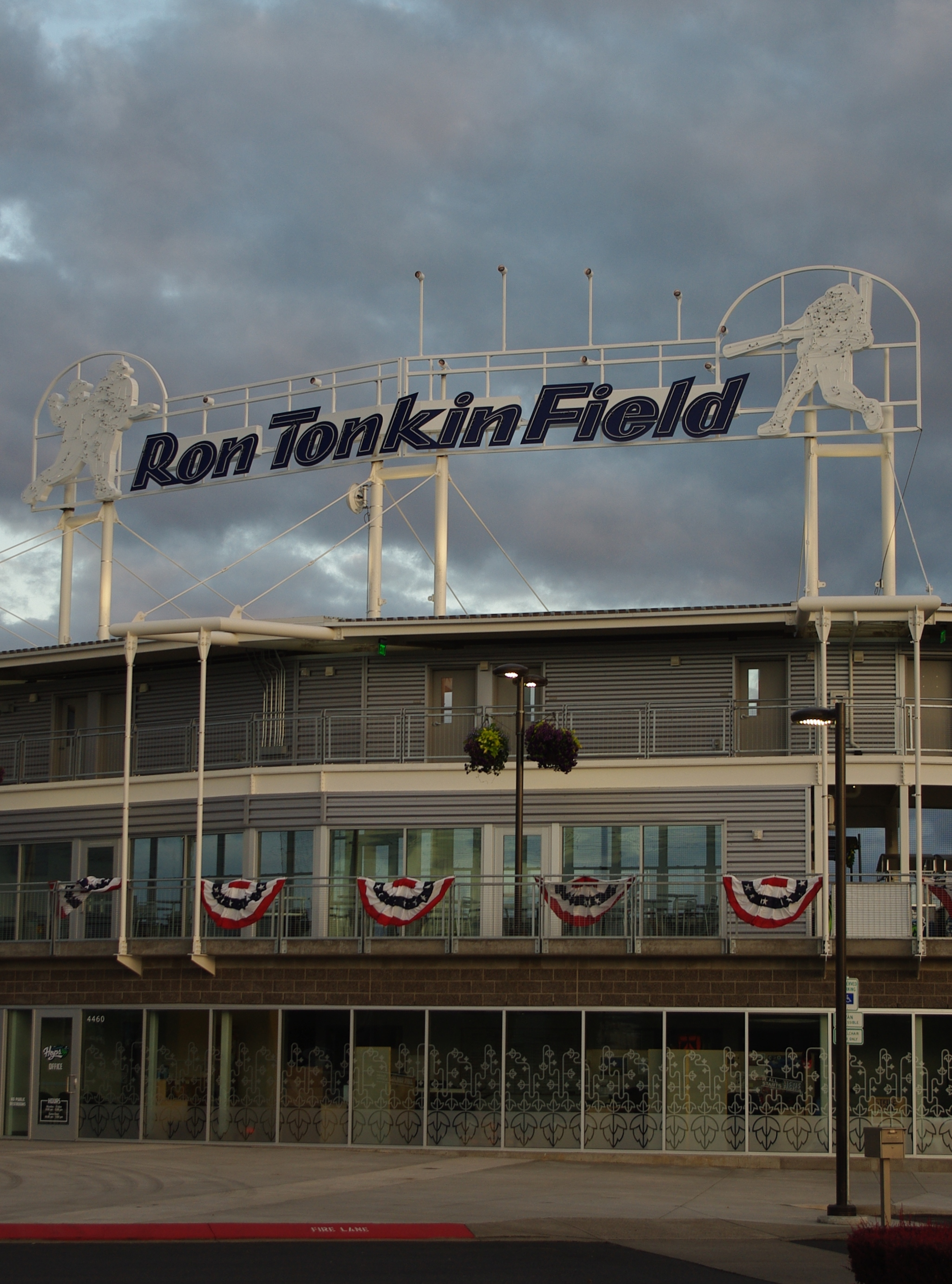
Signage after sponsorship deal

On April 16, the City Council considered authorizing up to $30 million in full faith and credit bonds to pay for several projects, including a baseball stadium. Repayment of the bonds would come from revenue generated by the stadium, and if necessary, discretionary funds from the general budget. City officials expected a $7.1 million economic impact annually from the stadium, and said the overall cost of the project would be half of what would normally be expected due to the existing infrastructure at the complex.

The council announced they might vote at their May 15 meeting to authorize the $15 million project, start negotiating a lease agreement with the team, and hire SRG Partnership to design the stadium with Hoffman Construction building the $13.4 million stadium. However, the city council did not consider the matter at that meeting as planned, as negotiations were still continuing with the Yakima Bears and the league.

Two weeks later, the Council announced they would again look at approving a term sheet with the owners of the Yakima franchise, and that the league had two teams interested in possibly relocating to Hillsboro. The deal with the Bears called for a 20-year lease on a $13.4 million stadium, with the team paying rent of $150,000 per year. The rent would increase 3% each year, with the team retaining concession revenues and the city keeping parking revenues, among other provisions. The city was also to consider contracting with Hoffman Construction to build the stadium, and hire SRG Partnership for the design. The city expects to sell naming rights to the stadium, with the city keeping 70% of the proceeds.

On June 5, the city council approved the offer sheet with Short Season, LLC in a unanimous vote, and agreed to hire Hoffman and SRG to design and build the facility. The deal was contingent upon Short Season signing-off on the deal, plus approval of the league, as well as both Minor and Major League Baseball. The city also acknowledged that revenues may not be enough to cover the debt payment, and that the city may need to use funds paid by Intel Corporation to the city as part of that company’s tax breaks or other city funds to cover any shortfall. Both the Bears and the Northwest League approved the offer sheet on June 8, and the city signed an agreement with the team on June 26. Final approval of the move was needed by September 4, 2012, from the league, Minor League Baseball, and Major League Baseball (MLB), with construction scheduled to start in October 2012. Milwaukie still hoped to land a team from the league as well, and their plan had the support of Portland Mayor Sam Adams.

MLB gave the final approval in August 2012 for the relocation, clearing the way for construction to begin. A ground-breaking ceremony with local leaders and team ownership was held on September 21, 2012. In February 2013, the main piece of public art was revealed to be a sculpture entitled Barometer to be created by Devin Laurence Field. Construction ended in mid-June 2013 with a public opening on June 13. The final construction costs totaled $15.55 million. The Hops' first home game was on June 17, 2013, with a sellout crowd of 4,710 in attendance. The stadium was named project of the year for 2013 by the American Public Works Association for public projects in Oregon between $5 and $25 million.

On May 13, 2014, the Ron Tonkin Family of Dealerships signed a ten-year naming rights deal with the city at $150,000 per year, giving the ballpark its new name of Ron Tonkin Field.

Tonkin Field hosted the Northwest League's all-star game in 2017.

It was announced in March 2023 that the Hillsboro Hops would build a new ballpark for the 2025 season instead of renovating Ron Tonkin Field. The new ballpark opened for the 2026 season to replace Ron Tonkin Field.

== Features ==
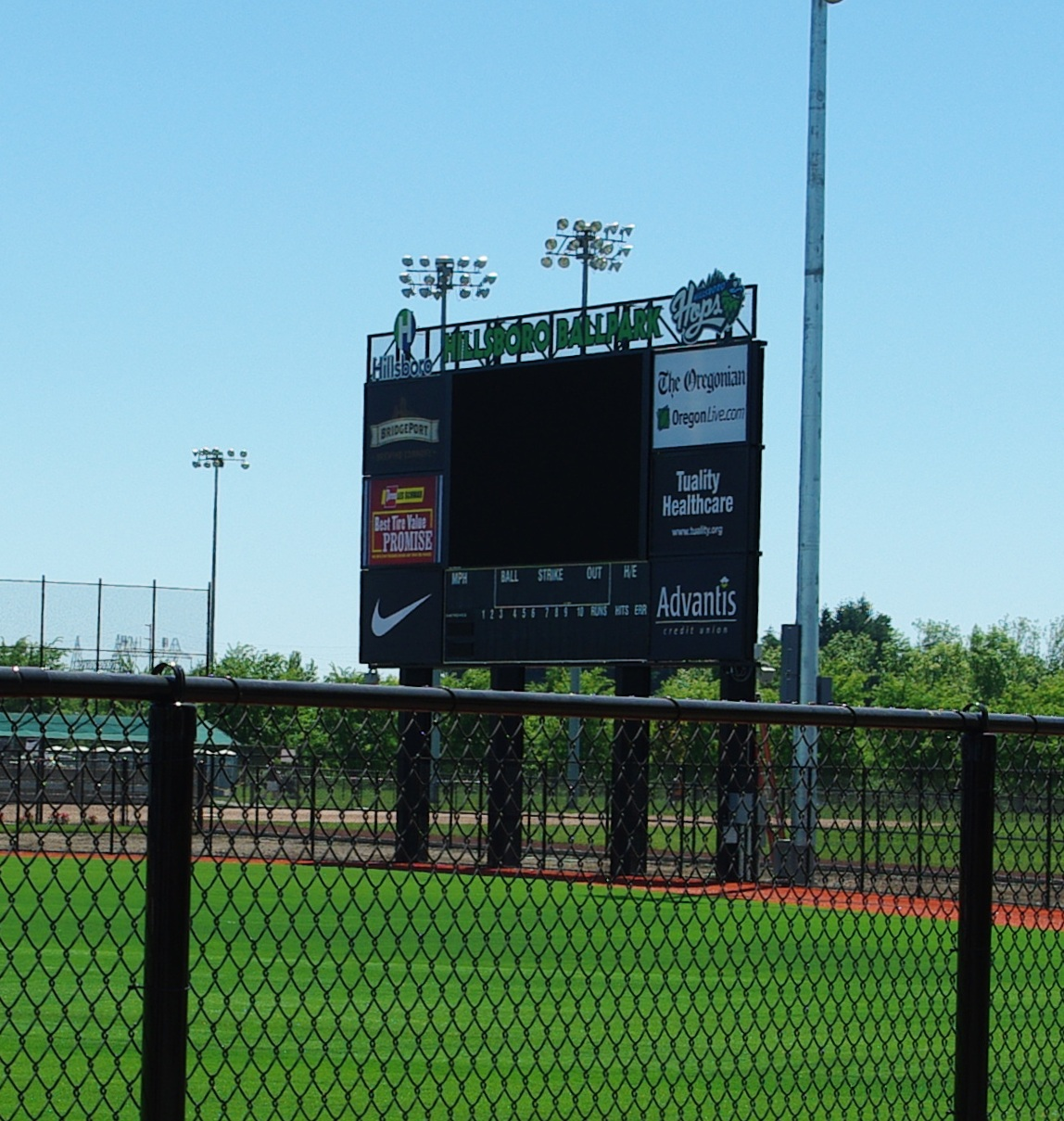
Ron Tonkin Field's scoreboard

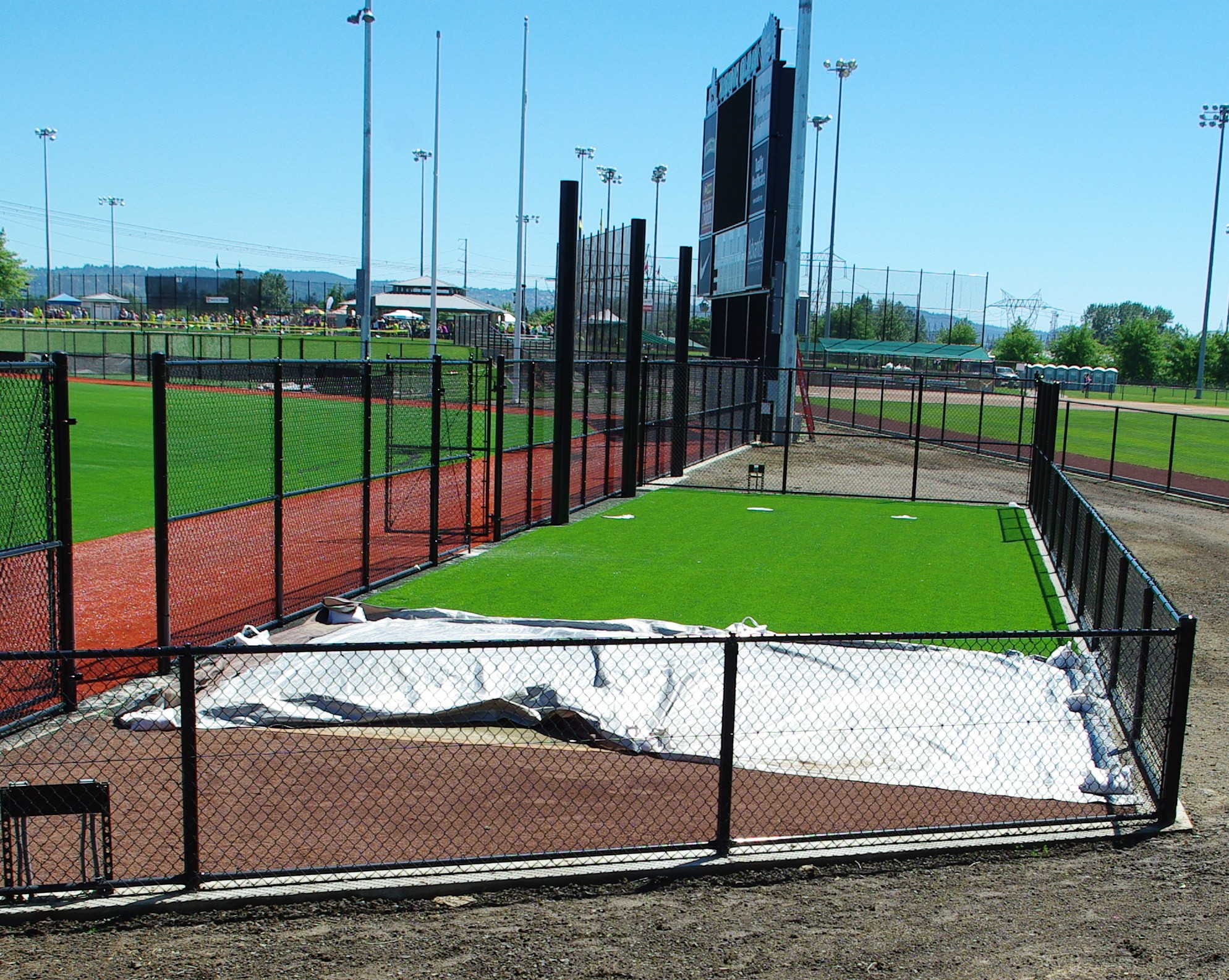
The bullpen in the outfield of Ron Tonkin Field

Ron Tonkin Field has a capacity of approximately 4,500 spectators. Of that total, there are 3,534 permanent seats, with the remaining capacity in the form of a standing-room-only area and a berm in the outfield sponsored by Frontier Communications. The berm seating is located along the entire outfield as well as at the end of the baselines. Most of the grandstand is covered, with the seating 14 rows deep. Additionally, there is a standing room only area and a beer garden. The beer garden, the Bridgeport Brew Pen, is located at the end of the first baseline, while the standing-room area is at the end of the third-base line.

The dimensions of the field are 325 feet (99 m) down both the left and right field lines, and 400 feet (122 m) to centerfield. The diamond has an unorthodox south-southwest alignment (home to center field); the recommended orientation is east-northeast. The home dugout is on the first base side; the home bullpen is in center field and the visitors' is in left field. The baseball field is all-weather artificial turf, while the only dirt is on the mound and the batters box. The elevation is approximately 220 feet (65 m) above sea level.

Team offices and the team store are both located on the lower level of the stadium. The upper levels contain an enclosed lounge and two open-air party decks. The Daktronics video scoreboard measures 25 by 14 feet (7.6 by 4.3 m). The interactive Barometer sculpture is located outside the entrance in the plaza area. When not in use by the Hops, the stadium is available for other baseball games as well as for other sports, such as soccer and lacrosse. Ron Tonkin Field shares its main entrance with the adjacent Hillsboro Stadium, and the two share common architectural elements such as cement blocks, corrugated steel, and the look of the roofs. The complex has 2,000 parking spaces.

== See also ==
- List of sports venues in Portland, Oregon

Preceded by Yakima County Stadium; As the Yakima Bears	Home of the Hillsboro Hops; 2013 – 2025	Succeeded by Hillsboro Hops Ballpark
