= Hodgetown =

Baseball stadium in Amarillo, Texas

- Location within Texas Location within the United States
- Interactive map of Hodgetown
- Former names: Amarillo Ballpark (planning stages); MPEV (planning stages)
- Location: 701 S Buchanan St; Amarillo, Texas
- Coordinates: 35°12′20.8″N 101°49′51.5″W
- Elevation: 3,600 ft (1,100 m)
- Owner: City of Amarillo
- Operator: Elmore Sports Group
- Capacity: 6,631
- Surface: Grass
- Field size: Left Field: 325 ft (99 m); Center Field: 400 ft (120 m); Right Field: 325 ft (99 m)
- Acreage: 9.3 acres (3.8 ha)

Construction
- Groundbreaking: February 1, 2018
- Built: 2018–2019
- Opened: April 8, 2019
- Cost: $45.5 million
- Architect: Populous
- General contractors: Western-Hunt (Western Builders and Hunt Construction Group)

Tenant
- Amarillo Sod Poodles (TL) 2019–present

Hodgetown is a baseball park in downtown Amarillo, Texas. It is the home ballpark of the Amarillo Sod Poodles, the Double-A affiliate of the Arizona Diamondbacks in the Texas League. It opened on April 8, 2019, and can seat 6,631 people. The park is named in honor of Amarillo pharmacist, businessman, philanthropist, and 26th Mayor of Amarillo Jerry Hodge. Hodgetown is the most elevated Double-A ballpark at approximately 3,600 feet above sea level.

In the ballpark's inaugural game on April 8, 2019, the Sod Poodles were defeated by the Midland RockHounds, 9–4 in 10 innings. The opener was attended by 7,175 people.
