= Amarillo Sod Poodles =

- Founded in 2019; Amarillo, Texas
Team logo
Cap insignia

Minor league affiliations
- Class: Double-A (2019–present)
- League: Texas League (2019–present)
- Division: South Division

Major league affiliations
- Team: Arizona Diamondbacks (2021–present)
- Previous teams: San Diego Padres (2019–2020)

Minor league titles
- League titles (3): 2019; 2023; 2026
- Division titles (3): 2019; 2023; 2026
- First-half titles (1): 2019
- Second-half titles (3): 2023; 2025; 2026

Team data
- Name: Amarillo Sod Poodles (2019–present)
- Colors: Texas blue, Amarillo yellow, Route 66 retro blue, Texas red, white
- Ballpark: Hodgetown (2019–present)
- Owner/ Operator: Elmore Sports Group
- General manager: Tony Ensor
- Manager: Javier Colina
- Website: milb.com/amarillo

The Amarillo Sod Poodles, nicknamed the Soddies, are a Minor League Baseball team of the Texas League and the Double-A affiliate of the Arizona Diamondbacks. They are located in Amarillo, Texas, and play their home games at Hodgetown in downtown Amarillo.

== History ==
On June 21, 2017, David G. Elmore, president of Elmore Sports Group, announced the relocation of the San Antonio Missions Double-A franchise to Amarillo in 2019, with the team set to compete in the Texas League under a new nickname. This move was part of a larger relocation wherein the Triple-A Colorado Springs Sky Sox of the Pacific Coast League relocated to San Antonio in 2019, continuing the use of the Missions nickname at the Triple-A level, and the Helena Brewers of the rookie level Pioneer League moved to Colorado Springs.

The organization officially states that team's name was decided in a name-the-team contest. Five finalists were selected: "Boot Scooters," "Bronc Busters," "Jerky," "Long Haulers," and "Sod Poodles." The names received negative feedback from locals over their absurd nature, but the team indicated their intention to adopt an unusual, family-friendly name. Brandiose, a branding firm in San Diego, were asked to create a new identity for the team. Their staff selected the Sod Poodles name after visiting Amarillo and researching its history. The name "Sod Poodle" is a local term for the prairie dog, which is highly prevalent in West Texas. The name was meant to convey the values of sticking together, being family oriented, and self sufficient.

Amarillo's home ballpark was named Hodgetown in honor of Amarillo pharmacist, businessman, philanthropist, and 26th Mayor of Amarillo Jerry Hodge.

As the Double-A affiliate of the San Diego Padres, the Sod Poodles played their first game, a 5–2 loss, on April 4, 2019, against the Corpus Christi Hooks at Whataburger Field in Corpus Christi. Their first win came the next evening when they defeated the Hooks, 7–5. The winning run was scored in the top of the seventh inning when Matthew Batten tripled and later scored on a Buddy Reed single. In their inaugural home opener on April 8, the Sod Poodles lost to the Midland RockHounds, 9–4 in 10 innings. The opener was attended by 7,175 people.

In the 2019 Texas League South Series, the Sod Poodles fell behind 2 games to none against the Midland RockHounds, before winning 3 straight games in Midland to advance to the Championship Series against the Tulsa Drillers, who defeated the Arkansas Travelers 3 games to 2.

In the 2019 Championship Series, Amarillo won game 1 by a score of 13-6 at Hodgetown, while falling 18-9 in game 2. As the series shifted to Tulsa, the Drillers took a 2 games to 1 in game 3 with a 2-0 win. The Sod Poodles battled back with a game 4 victory by a score of 3-0. In game 5, the Sod Poodles were down 3-1 in the top of the ninth before Taylor Trammell hit a grand slam to take a lead that the Sod Poodles would never relinquish, en route to a Texas League championship in their inaugural season.

On December 9, 2020, the Arizona Diamondbacks extended an invitation to the Sod Poodles to become their Double-A affiliate as a part of Major League Baseball's 2021 reorganization of the minor leagues. In a further change, they were organized into the Double-A Central. In 2022, the Double-A Central became known as the Texas League, the name historically used by the regional circuit prior to the 2021 reorganization.

In 2022, Veronica Gajownik coached for the Sod Poodles.

In March 2023, the Sod Poodles won top team name in MiLB as voted by subscribers of The Athletic. The franchise won the 2023 Minor League Baseball Organization of the Year Award.

The 2026 season saw Amarillo collect their second consecutive second half crown, securing a playoff spot. Amarillo won all four elimination games they played in the playoffs, winning a game three against the Frisco RoughRiders to move to their third Texas League Championship Series. Then, against the defending champion Springfield Cardinals, after dropping game one at home, the Sod Poodles went on the road and won both games. A 6-4 victory in the winner-take-all game three secured the franchise's third Texas League crown since the inception of the club in 2019. Additionally, they moved to 12-2 all-time in road playoff games, the most road playoff wins of any Minor League Baseball franchise since 2019.

== Season-by-season records ==
=== Texas League ===
Season	PDC	Division	Finish	Wins	Losses	Win%	Postseason	Manager	Attendance
Amarillo Sod Poodles
2019 †	SD	South	2nd	72	66	.522	Won First-Half Southern Division title Won Southern Division title vs. Midland RockHounds, 3–2; Won TL championship vs. Tulsa Drillers, 3–2	Phillip Wellman	427,791
2021	ARI	South	3rd	59	61	.492	—	Shawn Roof	316,288
2022	ARI	South	2nd	68	68	.500	—	Shawn Roof	379,039
2023 †	ARI	South	1st	77	61	.558	Won Second-Half Southern Division title Won Southern Division title vs. San Antonio Missions, 2–1; Won TL championship vs. Arkansas Travelers, 2–1	Shawn Roof	355,440
2024	ARI	South	4th	58	79	.423	—	Tim Bogar	340,033
2025 *	ARI	South	2nd	71	67	.515	Won Second-Half Southern Division title Lost Southern Division title vs. Midland RockHounds, 2–0	Javier Colina	319,647
2026 †	ARI	South	1st	77	60	.562	Won Second-Half Southern Division title Won Southern Division title vs. Frisco RoughRiders, 2–1; Won TL championship vs. Springfield Cardinals, 2–1	Javier Colina	302,310

* Division winner	† League champions

== Roster ==
Amarillo Sod Poodles roster
Players	Coaches/Other
Pitchers: 43 Roman Angelo; 40 Wellington Aracena; 10 Joe Ariola; 24 Alec Baker; 27 Dawson Brown; 33 Billy Corcoran; 15 Brian Curley; 30 Josh Grosz; 31 David Hagaman; 28 Sawyer Hawks; 23 Will Mabrey; 38 Mason Marriott; 16 Antonio Menendez; 35 Logan Mercado; 14 Alfred Morillo; 11 Carlos Rey; 26 Junior Sanchez; 41 John West; Catchers: 29 Gavin Logan; 20 Carlos Virahonda; Infielders: 10 Jansel Luis; 13 Ben McLaughlin; 9 Danny Serretti; 12 Yassel Soler; 8 Cristofer Torin; 2 Jean Walters; Outfielders: 25 Avery Owusu-Asiedu; 1 Junior Franco; 7 Druw Jones; 3 Angel Ortiz	Manager: 22 Javier Colina; Coaches: -- Jaime Del Valle (bench); 18 Gaby Hernandez (pitching); -- Ronald Ramirez (bench); 45 Ty Wright (hitting); 60-day injured list: 16 Yordin Chalas (full season); 32 Hunter Cranton; -- Sean Harney (full season); 16 Jack Hurley; 31 Adonys Perez; 7-day injured list; * On Arizona Diamondbacks 40-man roster; ~ Development list; # Rehab assignment; ∞ Reserve list; ‡ Restricted list; § Suspended list; † Temporarily inactive list; Roster updated September 24, 2026; Transactions; → More rosters: MiLB • Texas League; → Arizona Diamondbacks minor league players

== Minor league affiliations ==
Level	Team	League	Location	Manager
Triple-A	Reno Aces	Pacific Coast League	Reno, Nevada	Blake Lalli
Double-A	Amarillo Sod Poodles	Texas League	Amarillo, Texas	Shawn Roof
High-A	Hillsboro Hops	Northwest League	Hillsboro, Oregon	Vince Harrison
Single-A	Visalia Rawhide	California League	Visalia, California	Javier Colina
Rookie	AZL D-backs	Arizona League	Scottsdale, Arizona	Rolando Arnedo
Rookie	DSL D-backs 1	Dominican Summer League	Boca Chica, Santo Domingo	Jaime Del Valle
Rookie	DSL D-backs 2	Dominican Summer League	Boca Chica, Santo Domingo	Ronald Ramirez
