= High-A =

Third-highest level of competition in Minor League Baseball

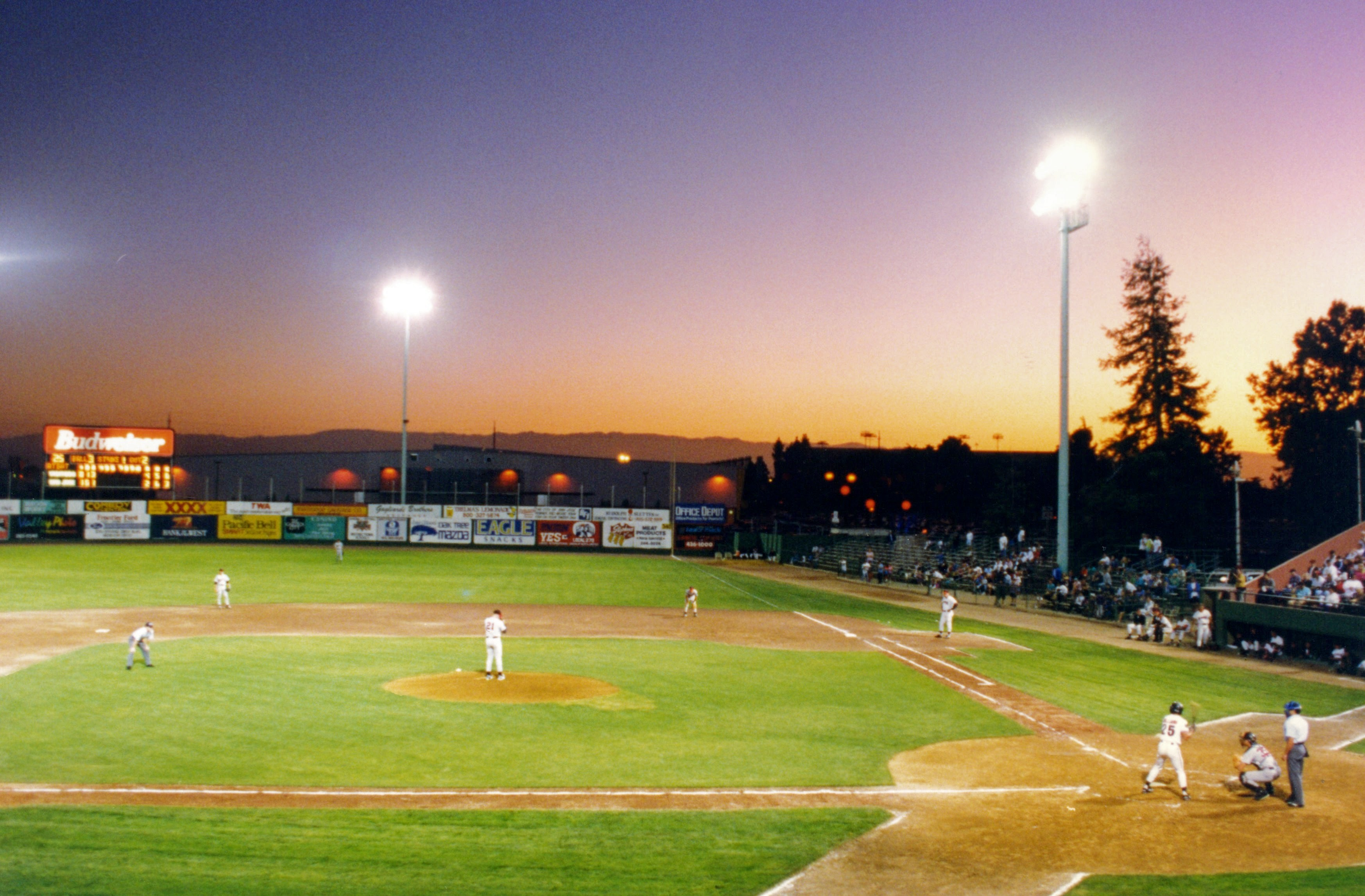
A High-A game featuring the San Jose Giants, the High-A affiliate of the San Francisco Giants, in 1994

High-A, officially Class High-A, formerly known as Class A-Advanced, and sometimes abbreviated "A+" in writing, is the third-highest level of play in Minor League Baseball in the United States and Canada, below Triple-A and Double-A, and above Single-A. There are 30 teams classified at the High-A level, one for each team in Major League Baseball (MLB), organized into three leagues: the Midwest League, Northwest League, and South Atlantic League.

== History ==
What is now Class High-A was established as Class A-Advanced in 1990 by subdividing the existing Class A. Class A had been the third-highest level in the minor leagues since 1936 (when it was below Double-A and Class A1) and a hierarchy of Triple-A and Double-A above Class A had been in place since 1946. In 1963, the three classes below Class A (Classes B, C, and D) were abolished, with leagues at those levels moved into Class A. In 1965, Class A was subdivided for the first time, with the establishment of lower-level Class A Short Season leagues.

The 1965 hierarchy was in place for 25 years, until Class A was further subdivided in 1990, with Class A-Advanced becoming the third-highest classification:

1. Triple-A
2. Double-A
3. Class A-Advanced
4. Class A ("Full-Season A")
5. Class A Short Season ("Short-Season A")
6. Rookie league

Three Class A leagues received the Class A-Advanced designation: the California League, Carolina League, and Florida State League. This arrangement continued until 2021, when Major League Baseball (MLB) restructured the minor leagues, eliminating Class A Short Season and discontinuing the use of all historical league names within Minor League Baseball. The existing Class A-Advanced leagues were moved to the Class A level and operated under generic names (Low-A West, Low-A East, and Low-A Southeast) during 2021. The Class A-Advanced level was officially renamed as "Class High-A", and also operated three leagues during 2021 with generic names: High-A Central, High-A East, and High-A West. These three High-A leagues had historically been known as the Midwest League, South Atlantic League, and Northwest League—the first two had previously operated at the Class A level, while the latter had previously operated at the Class A Short Season level. Following MLB's acquisition of the rights to the names of the historical minor leagues, MLB announced on March 16, 2022, that the leagues would revert to their prior names, effective with the 2022 season.

In January 2023, it was announced that Veronica Gajownik had been hired to manage the Hillsboro Hops, making her the first woman to manage a High-A team.

== Current teams ==
- Midwest League
- Northwest League
- South Atlantic League

=== Midwest League ===
Division	Team	MLB affiliation	City	Stadium	Capacity
East	Dayton Dragons	Cincinnati Reds	Dayton, Ohio	Day Air Ballpark	7,230
East	Fort Wayne TinCaps	San Diego Padres	Fort Wayne, Indiana	Parkview Field	8,100
East	Great Lakes Loons	Los Angeles Dodgers	Midland, Michigan	Dow Diamond	5,200
East	Lake County Captains	Cleveland Guardians	Eastlake, Ohio	Classic Auto Group Park	7,273
East	Lansing Lugnuts	Athletics	Lansing, Michigan	Jackson Field	9,500
East	West Michigan Whitecaps	Detroit Tigers	Comstock Park, Michigan	LMCU Ballpark	9,281
West	Beloit Sky Carp	Miami Marlins	Beloit, Wisconsin	ABC Supply Stadium	3,850
West	Cedar Rapids Kernels	Minnesota Twins	Cedar Rapids, Iowa	Veterans Memorial Stadium	5,300
West	Peoria Chiefs	St. Louis Cardinals	Peoria, Illinois	Dozer Park	8,500
West	Quad Cities River Bandits	Kansas City Royals	Davenport, Iowa	Modern Woodmen Park	7,140
West	South Bend Cubs	Chicago Cubs	South Bend, Indiana	Four Winds Field at Coveleski Stadium	5,000
West	Wisconsin Timber Rattlers	Milwaukee Brewers	Appleton, Wisconsin	Neuroscience Group Field at Fox Cities Stadium	5,900

=== Northwest League ===
Team	Founded	MLB affiliation	City	Stadium	Capacity
Eugene Emeralds	1955	San Francisco Giants	Eugene, Oregon	PK Park	4,000
Everett AquaSox	1995	Seattle Mariners	Everett, Washington	Funko Field	3,682
Hillsboro Hops	2013	Arizona Diamondbacks	Hillsboro, Oregon	Hillsboro Ballpark	4,500
Spokane Indians	1898	Colorado Rockies	Spokane, Washington	Avista Stadium	6,803
Tri-City Dust Devils	2001	Los Angeles Angels	Pasco, Washington	Gesa Stadium	3,654
Vancouver Canadians	2000	Toronto Blue Jays	Vancouver, British Columbia	Nat Bailey Stadium	6,500

=== South Atlantic League ===
Division	Team	MLB affiliation	City	Stadium	Capacity
North	Brooklyn Cyclones	New York Mets	Brooklyn, New York	Maimonides Park	7,000
North	Frederick Keys	Baltimore Orioles	Frederick, Maryland	Harry Grove Stadium	5,400
North	Greensboro Grasshoppers	Pittsburgh Pirates	Greensboro, North Carolina	First National Bank Field	7,499
North	Hudson Valley Renegades	New York Yankees	Wappingers Falls, New York	Heritage Financial Park	5,400
North	Jersey Shore BlueClaws	Philadelphia Phillies	Lakewood, New Jersey	ShoreTown Ballpark	8,000
North	Wilmington Blue Rocks	Washington Nationals	Wilmington, Delaware	Daniel S. Frawley Stadium	6,404
South	Asheville Tourists	Houston Astros	Asheville, North Carolina	McCormick Field	4,000
South	Bowling Green Hot Rods	Tampa Bay Rays	Bowling Green, Kentucky	Bowling Green Ballpark	4,559
South	Greenville Drive	Boston Red Sox	Greenville, South Carolina	Fluor Field at the West End	6,700
South	Hub City Spartanburgers	Texas Rangers	Spartanburg, South Carolina	Fifth Third Park	5,000
South	Rome Emperors	Atlanta Braves	Rome, Georgia	AdventHealth Stadium	5,105
South	Winston-Salem Dash	Chicago White Sox	Winston-Salem, North Carolina	Truist Stadium	5,500

== Playoffs ==
The format for the 2024 postseason at High-A will consist of four teams per league in a best-of-three division series, followed by a best-of-three championship series. The four playoff participants per league will be the winners of each division from both halves based on the best winning percentage of each half. In the event the same club wins both halves, the club with the next-best winning percentage in the second half will advance.

However, with only six clubs in the Northwest League, the format for the postseason will consist of a single, best-of-five championship series. The two playoff participants will be decided based on the best winning percentage of each half. In the event the same club wins both halves, the club with the next-best winning percentage in the second half will advance.

In the event of any ties, the following tiebreakers will apply in the order below:

1. Head-to-head record between the clubs in the respective half (if three or more clubs, best winning percentage in games among the clubs).
2. If the clubs remain tied, best overall winning percentage over the last 20 games.
3. If the clubs remain tied, best overall winning percentage over an additional game (i.e., the last 21 games, the last 22 games, etc.) until one emerges with a better winning percentage in that span of games.

== See also ==
- List of High-A baseball team owners
