= 1990 St. Louis Cardinals season =

Major League Baseball season

1990 St. Louis Cardinals
- League: National League
- Division: East
- Ballpark: Busch Memorial Stadium
- City: St. Louis, Missouri
- Record: 70–92 (.432)
- Divisional place: 6th
- Owners: Anheuser-Busch
- General managers: Dal Maxvill
- Managers: Whitey Herzog, Red Schoendienst, Joe Torre
- Television: KPLR-TV (Al Hrabosky, Ken Wilson)
- Radio: KMOX (Jack Buck, Mike Shannon)

The 1990 St. Louis Cardinals season was the team's 109th season in St. Louis, Missouri and its 99th season in the National League. The Cardinals went 70–92 during the season and finished in sixth place of the National League East division, 25 games behind the NL East champion Pittsburgh Pirates. It was the first time the Cardinals had finished in last place since 1918. This was the most recent season the Cardinals finished in last place until 2023.

== Offseason ==
- November 28, 1989: Bryn Smith was signed as a free agent by the Cardinals.
- November 30, 1989: Danny Cox was signed as a free agent by the Cardinals.
- December 6, 1989: Jim Lindeman and Matt Kinzer were traded by the Cardinals to the Detroit Tigers for Bill Henderson (minors), Marcos Betances (minors), and Pat Austin (minors).
- February 27, 1990: Alex Cole and Steve Peters were traded by the Cardinals to the San Diego Padres for Omar Olivares.

== Regular season ==
Shortstop Ozzie Smith won a Gold Glove this year.

=== Opening Day starters ===
- Tom Brunansky
- Vince Coleman
- Pedro Guerrero
- Joe Magrane
- Willie McGee
- José Oquendo
- Terry Pendleton
- Ozzie Smith
- Todd Zeile

=== Season standings ===
NL East
Team	W	L	Pct.	GB	Home	Road
Pittsburgh Pirates	95	67	.586	—	49‍–‍32	46‍–‍35
New York Mets	91	71	.562	4	52‍–‍29	39‍–‍42
Montreal Expos	85	77	.525	10	47‍–‍34	38‍–‍43
Chicago Cubs	77	85	.475	18	39‍–‍42	38‍–‍43
Philadelphia Phillies	77	85	.475	18	41‍–‍40	36‍–‍45
St. Louis Cardinals	70	92	.432	25	34‍–‍47	36‍–‍45

=== Record vs. opponents ===
1990 National League record Sources:
Team	ATL	CHC	CIN	HOU	LAD	MON	NYM	PHI	PIT	SD	SF	STL
Atlanta	—	6–6	8–10	5–13	6–12	6–6	4–8	5–7	5–7	8–10	5–13	7–5
Chicago	6–6	—	4–8	6–6	3–9	11–7	9–9	11–7	4–14	8–4	7–5	8–10
Cincinnati	10–8	8–4	—	11–7	9–9	9–3	6–6	7–5	6–6	9–9	7–11	9–3
Houston	13–5	6–6	7–11	—	9–9	5–7	5–7	5–7	5–7	4–14	10–8	6–6
Los Angeles	12–6	9–3	9–9	9–9	—	6–6	5–7	8–4	4–8	9–9	8–10	7–5
Montreal	6–6	7–11	3–9	7–5	6–6	—	8–10	10–8	13–5	7–5	7–5	11–7
New York	8–4	9–9	6–6	7–5	7–5	10–8	—	10–8	10–8	5–7	7–5	12–6
Philadelphia	7-5	7–11	5–7	7–5	4–8	8–10	8–10	—	6–12	7–5	8–4	10–8
Pittsburgh	7–5	14–4	6–6	7–5	8–4	5–13	8–10	12–6	—	10–2	8–4	10–8
San Diego	10–8	4–8	9–9	14–4	9–9	5–7	7–5	5–7	2–10	—	7–11	3–9
San Francisco	13–5	5–7	11–7	8–10	10–8	5–7	5–7	4–8	4–8	11–7	—	9–3
St. Louis	5–7	10–8	3–9	6–6	5–7	7–11	6–12	8–10	8–10	9–3	3–9	—

=== Notable transactions ===
- April 23, 1990: John Costello was traded by the Cardinals to the Montreal Expos for Rex Hudler.
- May 4, 1990: Tom Brunansky was traded by the Cardinals to the Boston Red Sox for Lee Smith.
- May 5, 1990: Terry Francona was signed as a free agent by the Cardinals.
- July 2, 1990: Ernie Camacho was signed as a free agent by the Cardinals.
- August 29, 1990: Willie McGee was traded by the Cardinals to the Oakland Athletics for Félix José, Stan Royer, and Daryl Green (minors). However, McGee would win the NL batting title (he had enough plate appearances to qualify for it despite this trade).

=== Roster ===
1990 St. Louis Cardinals
Roster
Pitchers: 62 Ernie Camacho; 44 Cris Carpenter; 61 Stan Clarke; 50 John Costello; 46 Ken Dayley; 48 José DeLeón; 35 Frank DiPino; 43 Ken Hill; 42 Howard Hilton; 49 Ricky Horton; 32 Joe Magrane; 53 Greg Mathews; 41 Tom Niedenfuer; 55 Omar Olivares; 63 Mike Pérez; 56 Tim Sherrill; 36 Bryn Smith; 47 Lee Smith; 37 Scott Terry; 39 Bob Tewksbury; 30 John Tudor	Catchers: 19 Tom Pagnozzi; 54 Ray Stephens; 27 Todd Zeile; Infielders: 58 Rod Brewer; 15 Dave Collins; 28 Pedro Guerrero; 22,8 Tim Jones; 11 Jose Oquendo; 60 Gerónimo Peña; 9 Terry Pendleton; 1 Ozzie Smith; 21 Denny Walling; 12 Craig Wilson	Outfielders: 23 Tom Brunansky; 29 Vince Coleman; 23 Bernard Gilkey; 10 Rex Hudler; 40 Félix José; 16 Ray Lankford; 51 Willie McGee; 33 John Morris; 25 Milt Thompson	Manager: 24 Whitey Herzog; 2 Red Schoendienst; 22 Joe Torre; Coaches: 26 Steve Braun (hitting); 7 Rich Hacker (third base); 3 Dave Ricketts (bullpen); 5 Jim Riggleman (first base); 4 Mike Roarke (pitching); 2 Red Schoendienst (bench)

== Player stats ==
= Indicates team leader

=== Batting ===
==== Starters by position ====
Note: Pos = Position; G = Games played; AB = At bats; R = Runs; H = Hits; Avg. = Batting average; HR = Home runs; RBI = Runs batted in; SB = Stolen bases

Pos	Player	G	AB	R	H	Avg.	HR	RBI	SB
C	Todd Zeile	144	495	62	121	.244	15	57	2
1B	Pedro Guerrero	136	498	42	140	.281	13	80	1
2B	José Oquendo	156	469	38	118	.252	1	37	1
3B	Terry Pendleton	121	447	46	103	.230	6	58	7
SS	Ozzie Smith	143	512	61	130	.254	1	50	32
LF	Vince Coleman	124	497	73	145	.292	6	39	77
CF	Willie McGee	125	501	76	168	.335	3	62	28
RF	Milt Thompson	135	418	42	91	.218	6	30	25

==== Other batters ====
Note: G = Games played; AB = At bats; R = Runs; H = Hits; Avg. = Batting average; HR = Home runs; RBI = Runs batted in; SB = Stolen bases

Player	G	AB	R	H	Avg.	HR	RBI	SB
Tom Pagnozzi	69	220	20	61	.277	2	23	1
Rex Hudler	89	217	30	61	.281	7	22	18
Tim Jones	67	128	9	28	.219	1	12	3
Denny Walling	78	127	7	28	.220	1	19	0
Ray Lankford	39	126	12	36	.286	3	12	8
Craig Wilson	55	121	13	30	.248	0	7	0
Félix José	25	85	12	23	.271	0	3	4
Bernard Gilkey	18	64	11	19	.297	1	3	6
Dave Collins	99	58	12	13	.224	0	3	7
Tom Brunansky	19	57	5	9	.158	1	2	0
Gerónimo Peña	18	45	5	11	.244	0	2	1
Rod Brewer	14	25	4	6	.240	0	2	0
John Morris	18	18	0	2	.111	0	0	0
Ray Stephens	5	15	2	2	.133	1	1	0

=== Pitching ===
==== Starting pitchers ====
Note: G = Games pitched; IP = Innings pitched; W = Wins; L = Losses; ERA = Earned run average; BB = Walks allowed; SO = Strikeouts

Player	G	IP	W	L	ERA	BB	SO
Joe Magrane	31	203.1	10	17	3.59	59	100
José DeLeón	32	182.2	7	19	4.43	86	164
John Tudor	25	146.1	12	4	2.40	30	63
Bob Tewksbury	28	145.1	10	9	3.47	15	50
Bryn Smith	26	141.1	9	8	4.27	30	78
Ken Hill	17	78.2	5	6	5.49	33	58
Greg Mathews	11	50.2	0	5	5.33	30	18

==== Other pitchers ====
Note: G = Games pitched; IP = Innings pitched; W = Wins; L = Losses; ERA = Earned run average; BB = Walks allowed; SO = Strikeouts

Player	G	IP	W	L	ERA	BB	SO
Omar Olivares	9	49.1	1	1	2.92	17	20

==== Relief pitchers ====
Note: G = Games pitched; IP = Innings pitched; W = Wins; L = Losses; SV = Saves; ERA = Earned run average; BB = Walks allowed; SO = Strikeouts

Player	G	IP	W	L	SV	ERA	BB	SO
Lee Smith	53	68.2	3	4	27	2.10	20	70
Frank DiPino	62	81.0	5	2	3	4.56	31	49
Ken Dayley	58	73.1	4	4	2	3.56	30	51
Scott Terry	50	72.0	2	6	2	4.75	27	35
Tom Niedenfuer	52	65.0	0	6	2	3.46	25	32
Ricky Horton	32	42.0	1	1	1	4.93	22	18
Mike Pérez	13	13.2	1	0	1	3.95	3	5
Cris Carpenter	4	8.0	0	0	0	4.50	2	6
Ernie Camacho	6	5.2	0	0	0	7.94	6	7
Tim Sherrill	8	4.1	0	0	0	6.23	3	3
John Costello	4	4.1	0	0	0	6.23	1	1
Stan Clarke	2	3.1	0	0	0	2.70	0	3
Howard Hilton	2	3.0	0	0	0	0.00	3	2
Tim Jones	1	1.1	0	0	0	6.75	2	0

== Awards and honors ==
- Willie McGee, outfielder: Batting title (.335)
- Ozzie Smith, shortstop, National League Gold Glove

=== All-Stars ===
- Ozzie Smith, starter, shortstop

== Farm system ==
Level	Team	League	Manager
AAA	Louisville Redbirds	American Association	Gaylen Pitts
AA	Arkansas Travelers	Texas League	Dave Bialas
A	St. Petersburg Cardinals	Florida State League	Joe Pettini
A	Springfield Cardinals	Midwest League	Keith Champion
A	Savannah Cardinals	South Atlantic League	Rick Colbert
A-Short Season	Hamilton Redbirds	New York–Penn League	Luis Meléndez
Rookie	Johnson City Cardinals	Appalachian League	Mark DeJohn
Rookie	AZL Cardinals	Arizona League	Larry Milbourne
