= 1991 St. Louis Cardinals season =

Major League Baseball season

1991 St. Louis Cardinals
- League: National League
- Division: East
- Ballpark: Busch Memorial Stadium
- City: St. Louis, Missouri
- Record: 84–78 (.519)
- Divisional place: 2nd
- Owners: Anheuser-Busch
- General managers: Dal Maxvill
- Managers: Joe Torre
- Television: KPLR-TV (Al Hrabosky, George Grande)
- Radio: KMOX (Jack Buck, Mike Shannon, Joe Buck)

The 1991 St. Louis Cardinals season was the team's 110th season in St. Louis, Missouri and the 100th season in the National League. The Cardinals rebounded from a rare last-place finish a year earlier to register a record of 84–78 during the season and finished second to the Pittsburgh Pirates in the National League East by fourteen games.

Ozzie Smith set the National League record for fewest errors in a season by a shortstop with 8 errors. Gold Gloves were awarded to catcher Tom Pagnozzi and shortstop Ozzie Smith this year.

== Offseason ==
- October 11, 1990: Ernie Camacho was released by the St. Louis Cardinals.

== Regular season ==
=== Opening Day starters ===
- Bernard Gilkey
- Pedro Guerrero
- Felix Jose
- Ray Lankford
- José Oquendo
- Tom Pagnozzi
- Ozzie Smith
- Bob Tewksbury
- Todd Zeile

=== Season standings ===
NL East
Team	W	L	Pct.	GB	Home	Road
Pittsburgh Pirates	98	64	.605	—	52‍–‍32	46‍–‍32
St. Louis Cardinals	84	78	.519	14	52‍–‍32	32‍–‍46
Philadelphia Phillies	78	84	.481	20	47‍–‍36	31‍–‍48
Chicago Cubs	77	83	.481	20	46‍–‍37	31‍–‍46
New York Mets	77	84	.478	20½	40‍–‍42	37‍–‍42
Montreal Expos	71	90	.441	26½	33‍–‍35	38‍–‍55

=== Record vs. opponents ===
1991 National League record Sources:
Team	ATL	CHC	CIN	HOU	LAD	MON	NYM	PHI	PIT	SD	SF	STL
Atlanta	—	6–6	11–7	13–5	7–11	5–7	9–3	5–7	9–3	11–7	9–9	9–3
Chicago	6–6	—	4–8	9–3	2–10	10–7	11–6	8–10	7–11	4–8	6–6	10–8
Cincinnati	7–11	8–4	—	9–9	6–12	6–6	5–7	9–3	2–10	8–10	10–8	4–8
Houston	5–13	3–9	9–9	—	8–10	2–10	7–5	7–5	4–8	6–12	9–9	5–7
Los Angeles	11–7	10–2	12–6	10–8	—	5–7	7–5	7–5	7–5	10–8	8–10	6–6
Montreal	7–5	7–10	6–6	10–2	7–5	—	4–14	4–14	6–12	6–6	7–5	7–11
New York	3–9	6–11	7–5	5–7	5–7	14–4	—	11–7	6–12	7–5	6–6	7–11
Philadelphia	7-5	10–8	3–9	5–7	5–7	14–4	7–11	—	6–12	9–3	6–6	6–12
Pittsburgh	3–9	11–7	10–2	8–4	5–7	12–6	12–6	12–6	—	7–5	7–5	11–7
San Diego	7–11	8–4	10–8	12–6	8–10	6–6	5–7	3–9	5–7	—	11–7	9–3
San Francisco	9–9	6–6	8–10	9–9	10–8	5–7	6–6	6–6	5–7	7–11	—	4–8
St. Louis	3–9	8–10	8–4	7–5	6–6	11–7	11–7	12–6	7–11	3–9	8–4	—

=== Transactions ===
June 3, 1991: John Mabry was drafted by the St. Louis Cardinals in the 6th round of the 1991 amateur draft. Player signed June 11, 1991.

=== Roster ===
1991 St. Louis Cardinals
Roster
Pitchers: 49 Juan Agosto; 44 Cris Carpenter; 55 Mark Clark; 52 Rhéal Cormier; 48 José DeLeón; 46 Willie Fraser; 50 Mark Grater; 43 Ken Hill; 22 Bob McClure; 41 Jamie Moyer; 26 Omar Olivares; 42 Mike Pérez; 56 Tim Sherrill; 36 Bryn Smith; 47 Lee Smith; 37 Scott Terry; 39 Bob Tewksbury	Catchers: 29 Rich Gedman; 19 Tom Pagnozzi; 54 Ray Stephens; Infielders: 18 Luis Alicea; 33 Rod Brewer; 28 Pedro Guerrero; 8 Tim Jones; 11 Jose Oquendo; 7 Gerónimo Peña; 21 Gerald Perry; 5 Stan Royer; 1 Ozzie Smith; 12 Craig Wilson; 27 Todd Zeile	Outfielders: 23 Bernard Gilkey; 10 Rex Hudler; 34 Félix José; 16 Ray Lankford; 25 Milt Thompson	Manager: 9 Joe Torre; Coaches: 40 Joe Coleman (Pitching); 15 Dave Collins (First Base); 30 Bucky Dent (Third Base); 4 Gaylen Pitts (Hitting); 3 Dave Ricketts (Bullpen); 2 Red Schoendienst (Bench)

== Player stats ==
=== Batting ===
Note: G = Games played; AB = At bats; H = Hits; Avg. = Batting average; HR = Home runs; RBI = Runs batted in

Pos.	Player	G	AB	H	Avg.	HR	RBI
C	Tom Pagnozzi	140	459	121	.264	2	57
1B	Pedro Guerrero	115	427	116	.272	8	70
2B	José Oquendo	127	366	88	.240	1	26
3B	Todd Zeile	155	565	158	.280	11	81
SS	Ozzie Smith	150	550	157	.285	3	50
LF	Bernard Gilkey	81	268	58	.216	5	20
CF	Ray Lankford	151	566	142	.251	9	69
RF	Félix José	154	568	173	.305	8	77

==== Other batters ====
Note; G = Games played; AB = At bats; H = Hits; Avg.= Batting average; HR = Home runs; RBI = Runs batted in

Player	G	AB	H	Avg.	HR	RBI
Milt Thompson	115	326	100	.307	6	34
Gerald Perry	109	242	58	.240	6	36
Rex Hudler	101	207	47	.227	1	15
Gerónimo Peña	104	185	45	.243	5	17
Rich Gedman	46	94	10	.106	3	8
Craig Wilson	60	82	14	.171	0	13
Luis Alicea	56	68	13	.191	0	0
Tim Jones	16	24	4	.167	0	2
Stan Royer	9	21	6	.286	0	1
Rod Brewer	19	13	1	.077	0	1
Ray Stephens	6	7	2	.286	0	0

=== Starting pitchers ===
Note: G = Games pitched; IP = Innings pitched: W = Wins; L = Losses; ERA = Earned run average; SO = Strikeouts

Player	G	IP	W	L	ERA	SO
Bryn Smith	31	198.2	12	9	3.85	94
Bob Tewksbury	30	191.0	11	12	3.25	75
Ken Hill	30	181.1	11	10	3.57	121
Omar Olivares	28	167.1	11	7	3.71	91
José DeLeón	28	162.2	5	9	2.71	118
Rhéal Cormier	11	67.2	4	5	4.12	38
Jamie Moyer	8	31.1	0	5	5.74	20

==== Other pitchers ====
Note: G = Games pitched; IP = Innings pitched; W = Wins; L = Losses; ERA = Earned run average; SO = Strikeouts

Player	G	IP	W	L	ERA	SO
Mark Clark	7	22.1	1	1	4.03	13

===== Relief pitchers =====
Note: G = Games pitched; W = Wins; L = Losses; SV = Saves; ERA = Earned run average; SO = Strikeouts

Player	G	W	L	SV	ERA	SO
Lee Smith	67	6	3	47	2.34	67
Juan Agosto	72	5	3	2	4.81	34
Scott Terry	65	4	4	1	2.80	52
Cris Carpenter	59	10	4	0	4.23	47
Willie Fraser	35	3	3	0	4.93	25
Bob McClure	32	1	1	0	3.13	15
Mike Pérez	14	0	2	0	5.82	7
Tim Sherrill	10	0	0	0	8.16	4
Mark Grater	3	0	0	0	0.00	0
José Oquendo	1	0	0	0	27.00	1

== Awards and honors ==
- Tom Pagnozzi, catcher, National League Gold Glove
- Ozzie Smith, shortstop, National League Gold Glove

== Farm system ==
Level	Team	League	Manager
AAA	Louisville Redbirds	American Association	Mark DeJohn
AA	Arkansas Travelers	Texas League	Joe Pettini
A	St. Petersburg Cardinals	Florida State League	Dave Bialas
A	Springfield Cardinals	Midwest League	Mike Ramsey
A	Savannah Cardinals	South Atlantic League	Larry Milbourne
A-Short Season	Hamilton Redbirds	New York–Penn League	Rick Colbert
Rookie	Johnson City Cardinals	Appalachian League	Chris Maloney
Rookie	AZL Cardinals	Arizona League	Keith Champion
