= 1994 St. Louis Cardinals season =

Major League Baseball season

1994 St. Louis Cardinals
- League: National League
- Division: Central
- Ballpark: Busch Memorial Stadium
- City: St. Louis, Missouri
- Record: 53–61 (.465)
- Divisional place: 3rd
- Owners: Anheuser-Busch
- General managers: Dal Maxvill
- Managers: Joe Torre
- Television: KPLR; Prime Sports Midwest (Joe Buck, Bob Carpenter, Al Hrabosky)
- Radio: KMOX (Jack Buck, Mike Shannon, Joe Buck)

The 1994 St. Louis Cardinals season was the team's 113th season in St. Louis, Missouri and the 103rd season in the National League. The Cardinals went 53–61 during the season and finished tied for third place with the Pittsburgh Pirates in the National League Central division, 13 games behind the Cincinnati Reds. The season was cut short due to the infamous 1994 player's strike.

Catcher Tom Pagnozzi won a Gold Glove this year.

== Offseason ==
- October 27, 1993: Terry McGriff was signed as a free agent with the St. Louis Cardinals.
- November 15, 1993: Scott Coolbaugh was signed as a free agent with the St. Louis Cardinals.
- December 14, 1993: Ozzie Canseco was traded by the St. Louis Cardinals to the Milwaukee Brewers for Tony Diggs (minors).

== Regular season ==
By Friday, August 12, the Cardinals had compiled a 53-61 record through 114 games (although they had actually played 115 games, since their April 6 match versus the Cincinnati Reds at Riverfront Stadium ended after the top of the 6th inning due to poor weather). They had scored 535 runs (4.65 per game) and allowed 621 runs (5.40 per game).

=== Opening Day starters ===
- Luis Alicea
- René Arocha
- Bernard Gilkey
- Gregg Jefferies
- Ray Lankford
- Erik Pappas
- Ozzie Smith
- Mark Whiten
- Todd Zeile

=== Season standings ===
NL Central
Team	W	L	Pct.	GB	Home	Road
Cincinnati Reds	66	48	.579	—	37‍–‍22	29‍–‍26
Houston Astros	66	49	.574	½	37‍–‍22	29‍–‍27
Pittsburgh Pirates	53	61	.465	13	32‍–‍29	21‍–‍32
St. Louis Cardinals	53	61	.465	13	23‍–‍33	30‍–‍28
Chicago Cubs	49	64	.434	16½	20‍–‍39	29‍–‍25

Division leaders
Team	W	L	Pct.
Montreal Expos	74	40	.649
Cincinnati Reds	66	48	.579
Los Angeles Dodgers	58	56	.509

Wild Card team	W	L	Pct.	GB
Atlanta Braves	68	46	0.597	—
Houston Astros	66	49	0.574	2 1/2
New York Mets	55	58	0.487	12 1/2
San Francisco Giants	55	60	0.478	13 1/2
Philadelphia Phillies	54	61	0.470	14 1/2
St. Louis Cardinals	53	61	0.465	15
Pittsburgh Pirates	53	61	0.465	15
Colorado Rockies	53	64	0.453	16 1/2
Florida Marlins	51	64	0.444	17 1/2
Chicago Cubs	49	64	0.434	18 1/2
San Diego Padres	47	70	0.402	22 1/2

=== Record vs. opponents ===
1994 National League record Source: MLB Standings Grid – 1994
Team	ATL	CHC	CIN	COL	FLA	HOU	LAD	MON	NYM	PHI	PIT	SD	SF	STL
Atlanta	—	4–2	5–5	8–2	8–4	3–3	6–0	4–5	5–4	6–3	3–9	6–1	5–1	5–7
Chicago	2–4	—	5–7	6–6	4–5	4–8	3–3	2–4	1–4	1–6	5–5	6–3	5–4	5–5
Cincinnati	5–5	7–5	—	4–4	7–5	4–6	3–6	4–2	2–4	4–2	9–3	8–2	7–2	2–2–1
Colorado	2–8	6–6	4–4	—	3–9	5–5	4–6	4–2	5–1	2–4	2–3	5–5	3–7	8–4
Florida	4–8	5–4	5–7	9–3	—	2–4	3–3	2–7	6–4	4–6	1–6	5–1	2–4	3–7
Houston	3–3	8–4	6–4	5–5	4–2	—	1–8	2–4	3–3	5–1	8–4	5–5	8–2	8–4
Los Angeles	0–6	3–3	6–3	6–4	3–3	8–1	—	3–9	6–6	7–5	3–3	6–4	5–5	2–4
Montreal	5–4	4–2	2–4	2–4	7–2	4–2	9–3	—	4–3	5–4	8–2	12–0	5–7	7–3
New York	4–5	4–1	4–2	1–5	4–6	3–3	6–6	3–4	—	4–6	4–5	6–6	6–6	6–3
Philadelphia	3-6	6–1	2–4	4–2	6–4	1–5	5–7	4–5	6–4	—	5–4	4–8	4–8	4–3
Pittsburgh	9–3	5–5	3–9	3–2	6–1	4–8	3–3	2–8	5–4	4–5	—	3–3	1–5	5–5
San Diego	1–6	3–6	2–8	5–5	1–5	5–5	4–6	0–12	6–6	8–4	3–3	—	5–2	4–2
San Francisco	1–5	4–5	2–7	7–3	4–2	2–8	5–5	7–5	6–6	8–4	5–1	2–5	—	2–4
St. Louis	7–5	5–5	2–2–1	4–8	7–3	4–8	4–2	3–7	3–6	3–4	5–5	2–4	4–2	—

=== Transactions ===
- June 2, 1994: Ryan Freel was drafted by the St. Louis Cardinals in the 14th round of the 1994 amateur draft, but did not sign.

=== Roster ===
1994 St. Louis Cardinals
Roster
Pitchers: 43 René Arocha; 59 Gary Buckels; 54 Frank Cimorelli; 52 Rhéal Cormier; 41 Steve Dixon; 24 Bryan Eversgerd; 60 John Frascatore; 32 John Habyan; 46 Rob Murphy; 26 Omar Olivares; 58 Vicente Palacios; 42 Mike Pérez; 33 Rich Rodriguez; 57 Willie Smith; 40 Rick Sutcliffe; 39 Bob Tewksbury; 34 Tom Urbani; 38 Allen Watson	Catchers: 54,7 Terry McGriff; 19 Tom Pagnozzi; 12 Erik Pappas; Infielders: 18 Luis Alicea; 53 Scott Coolbaugh; 44 Tripp Cromer; 25 Gregg Jefferies; 11 Jose Oquendo; 21 Gerónimo Peña; 28 Gerald Perry; 5 Stan Royer; 1 Ozzie Smith; 27 Todd Zeile	Outfielders: 23 Bernard Gilkey; 3 Brian Jordan; 16 Ray Lankford; 47 John Mabry; 22 Mark Whiten; 15 Gerald Young	Manager: 9 Joe Torre; Coaches: 7 José Cardenal (First Base); 10 Chris Chambliss (Hitting); 40 Joe Coleman (Pitching); 30 Bucky Dent (Third Base); 4 Gaylen Pitts (Bullpen); 2 Red Schoendienst (Bench)

== Player stats ==
=== Batting ===
==== Starters by position ====
Note: Pos = Position; G = Games played; AB = At bats; H = Hits; Avg. = Batting average; HR = Home runs; RBI = Runs batted in

Pos	Player	G	AB	H	Avg.	HR	RBI
C	Tom Pagnozzi	70	243	66	.272	7	40
1B	Gregg Jeffries	103	397	129	.325	12	55
2B	Gerónimo Peña	83	213	54	.254	11	34
SS	Ozzie Smith	98	381	100	.262	3	30
3B	Todd Zeile	113	415	111	.267	19	75
LF	Bernard Gilkey	105	380	96	.253	6	45
CF	Ray Lankford	109	416	111	.267	19	57
RF	Mark Whiten	92	334	98	.293	14	53

==== Other batters ====
Note: G = Games played; AB = At bats; H = Hits; Avg. = Batting average; HR = Home runs; RBI = Runs batted in

Player	G	AB	H	Avg.	HR	RBI
Luis Alicea	88	205	57	.278	5	29
Brian Jordan	53	178	46	.258	5	15
José Oquendo	55	129	34	.264	0	9
Terry McGriff	42	114	25	.219	0	13
Gerald Perry	60	77	25	.325	3	18
Stan Royer	39	57	10	.175	1	2
Erik Pappas	15	44	4	.091	0	5
Gerald Young	16	41	13	.317	0	3
John Mabry	6	23	7	.304	0	3
Scott Coolbaugh	15	21	4	.190	2	6
Tripp Cromer	2	0	0	----	0	0

=== Pitching ===
==== Starting pitchers ====
Note: G = Games pitched; IP = Innings pitched; W = Wins; L = Losses; ERA = Earned run average; SO = Strikeouts

Player	G	IP	W	L	ERA	SO
Bob Tewksbury	24	155.2	12	10	5.32	79
Allen Watson	22	115.2	6	5	5.52	74
Omar Olivares	14	73.2	3	4	5.74	26
Rick Sutcliffe	16	67.2	6	4	6.52	26
Rhéal Cormier	7	39.2	3	2	5.45	26
John Frascatore	1	3.1	0	1	16.20	2

==== Other pitchers ====
Note: G = Games pitched; IP = Innings pitched; W = Wins; L = Losses; ERA = Earned run average; SO = Strikeouts

Player	G	IP	W	L	ERA	SO
Vicente Palacios	31	117.2	3	8	4.44	95
Tom Urbani	20	80.1	3	7	5.15	43

==== Relief pitchers ====
Note: G = Games pitched; W = Wins; L = Losses; SV = Saves; ERA = Earned run average; SO = Strikeouts

Player	G	W	L	SV	ERA	SO
Mike Pérez	36	2	3	12	8.71	20
Rich Rodriguez	56	3	5	0	4.03	43
John Habyan	52	1	0	1	3.23	46
Rob Murphy	50	4	3	2	3.79	25
René Arocha	45	4	4	11	4.01	62
Bryan Eversgerd	40	2	3	0	4.52	47
Frank Cimorelli	11	0	0	1	8.78	1
Gary Buckels	10	0	1	0	2.25	9
Willie Smith	8	1	1	0	9.00	7
Steve Dixon	2	0	0	0	23.14	1

== Farm system ==
Level	Team	League	Manager
AAA	Louisville Redbirds	American Association	Joe Pettini
AA	Arkansas Travelers	Texas League	Chris Maloney
A	St. Petersburg Cardinals	Florida State League	Mike Ramsey
A	Madison Hatters	Midwest League	Joe Cunningham, Jr.
A	Savannah Cardinals	South Atlantic League	Luis Meléndez
A-Short Season	New Jersey Cardinals	New York–Penn League	Roy Silver
Rookie	Johnson City Cardinals	Appalachian League	Steve Turco
Rookie	AZL Cardinals	Arizona League	Scott Melvin

LEAGUE CHAMPIONS: Savannah, New Jersey, AZL Cardinals
