= List of Arizona Complex League champions =

The Arizona Complex League (ACL), formerly known as the Arizona League (AZL), is a Minor League Baseball league that operates in and around Phoenix, Arizona, at the Rookie level, which is the lowest grade below Major League Baseball. A champion has been determined at the end of each season since the league was formed in 1988.

The ACL Athletics have won six Arizona Complex League championships, more than any other team, followed by the ACL Brewers and ACL Giants (5) and the ACL Mariners (4).

== History ==
The Arizona League (AZL) was founded in 1988. A league champion has been determined at the end of each season. Champions from 1988 to 1998 were simply the regular-season pennant winners—the team with the best winning percentage at the conclusion of the regular championship season. The first league champions were the AZL Brewers, who won by six games over the AZL Athletics in 1988.

The league began holding playoffs to determine league champions in 1999. Typically, the winners of each half of the league's split-season met in a single championship game. With the introduction of divisions in 2009, the postseason was expanded to include four teams. It was expanded further to include six teams in 2013. The championship round became a best-of-three series starting in 2016.

The 2020 season was cancelled due to the COVID-19 pandemic. In conjunction with Major League Baseball's (MLB) reorganization of Minor League Baseball in 2021, the Arizona League became known as the Arizona Complex League (ACL). No playoffs were held in 2021. Instead, the team with the best winning percentage was declared champion.

Since 2022, four teams—three division winners and one wild card—have qualified for the postseason. The semi-finals consist of a single-game. The winners advance to the best-of-three championship series.

== Champions ==
Key
Score	Score of the championship series

Champions
Year	Champion	Score	Runner-up	Ref.
1988	AZL Brewers	— (Note: No playoffs were held in 1988. The AZL Brewers had the league's highest winning percentage (.690, 40–18). The AZL Athletics finished in second-place at .586 (34–24).)	AZL Athletics	
1989	AZL Brewers	— (Note: No playoffs were held in 1989. The AZL Brewers had the league's highest winning percentage (.732, 41–15). The AZL Athletics finished in second-place at .518 (29–27).)	AZL Athletics	
1990	AZL Brewers	— (Note: No playoffs were held in 1990. The AZL Brewers had the league's highest winning percentage (.679, 36–17). The AZL Mariners finished in second-place at .604 (32–21).)	AZL Mariners	
1991	AZL Athletics	— (Note: No playoffs were held in 1991. The AZL Athletics had the league's highest winning percentage (.650, 39–21). The AZL Brewers finished in second-place at .567 (34–26).)	AZL Brewers	
1992	AZL Athletics	— (Note: No playoffs were held in 1992. The AZL Athletics had the league's highest winning percentage (.607, 34–22). The AZL Giants and AZL Mariners finished in a tie for second-place at .571 (32–24).)	AZL Giants & AZL Mariners	
1993	AZL Athletics	— (Note: No playoffs were held in 1993. The AZL Athletics had the league's highest winning percentage (.636, 35–20). The AZL Cardinals finished in second-place at .585 (31–22).)	AZL Cardinals	
1994	AZL Cardinals	— (Note: No playoffs were held in 1994. The AZL Cardinals had the league's highest winning percentage (.607, 34–22). The AZL Athletics and AZL Brewers finished in a tie for second-place at .571 (32–24).)	AZL Athletics & AZL Brewers	
1995	AZL Athletics	— (Note: No playoffs were held in 1995. The AZL Athletics had the league's highest winning percentage (.661, 37–19). The AZL Angels finished in second-place at .625 (35–21).)	AZL Angels	
1996	AZL Padres	— (Note: No playoffs were held in 1996. The AZL Padres had the league's highest winning percentage (.643, 36–20). The AZL Athletics finished in second-place at .589 (33–23).)	AZL Athletics	
1997	AZL Cubs	— (Note: No playoffs were held in 1997. The AZL Cubs had the league's highest winning percentage (.618, 34–21). The AZL Mariners finished in second-place at .536 (30–26).)	AZL Mariners	
1998	AZL Rockies	— (Note: No playoffs were held in 1998. The AZL Rockies had the league's highest winning percentage (.750, 42–14). The AZL Mariners finished in second-place at .564 (31–24).)	AZL Mariners	
1999	AZL Athletics	1–0	AZL Mexican Academy	
2000	AZL Mariners	1–0	AZL Rockies	
2001	AZL Athletics	1–0	AZL Mariners	
2002	AZL Cubs	1–0	AZL Giants	
2003	AZL Royals 1	1–0	AZL Rangers	
2004	AZL Giants	3–2	AZL Athletics	
2005	AZL Giants	— (Note: No playoffs were held in 2005. The AZL Giants won both halves of the league's split-season.)	—	
2006	AZL Padres	1–0	AZL Angels	
2007	AZL Mariners	1–0	AZL Giants	
2008	AZL Giants	1–0	AZL Angels	
2009	AZL Mariners	1–0	AZL Giants	
2010	AZL Brewers	1–0	AZL Reds	
2011	AZL Dodgers	1–0	AZL Giants	
2012	AZL Rangers	1–0	AZL Athletics	
2013	AZL Giants	1–0	AZL Dodgers	
2014	AZL Indians	1–0	AZL Giants	
2015	AZL White Sox	1–0	AZL Mariners	
2016	AZL Mariners	2–0	AZL Angels	
2017	AZL Cubs	2–1	AZL Giants	
2018	AZL Dodgers	2–1	AZL Cubs 1	
2019	AZL Rangers	2–0	AZL Indians Blue	
2020	None (season canceled due to COVID-19 pandemic)			
2021	ACL Rockies	— (Note: No playoffs were held in 2021. The ACL Rockies had the league's highest winning percentage (.746, 44–15). The ACL Mariners finished in second-place at .690 (40–18).)	ACL Mariners	
2022	ACL Giants Black	2–1	ACL Rockies	
2023	ACL Brewers	2–1	ACL Diamondbacks Red	
2024	ACL Dodgers	2–0	ACL Diamondbacks	
2025	ACL Angels	2–0	ACL Giants	
2026	ACL Rockies	2–1	ACL Reds	

== Wins by team ==
Active Arizona Complex League teams appear in bold. Championships by split-squad teams (e.g. ACL Giants Black) are listed by their main team (e.g. ACL Giants).

Team	Wins	Year(s)
**ACL Athletics** (AZL Athletics)	6	1991, 1992, 1993, 1995, 1999, 2001
**ACL Brewers** (AZL Brewers)	5	1988, 1989, 1990, 2010, 2023
**ACL Giants** (AZL Giants)	5	2004, 2005, 2008, 2013, 2022
**ACL Mariners** (AZL Mariners)	4	2000, 2007, 2009, 2016
**ACL Cubs** (AZL Cubs)	3	1997, 2002, 2017
**ACL Dodgers** (AZL Dodgers)	3	2011, 2018, 2024
**ACL Rockies** (AZL Rockies)	3	1998, 2021, 2026
**ACL Padres** (AZL Padres)	2	1996, 2006
**ACL Rangers** (AZL Rangers)	2	2012, 2019
**ACL Angels**	1	2025
AZL Cardinals	1	1994
**ACL Guardians** (AZL Indians)	1	2014
**ACL Royals** (AZL Royals)	1	2003
**ACL White Sox** (AZL White Sox)	1	2015
