= Whiteyball =

Style of playing baseball

Whiteyball is a style of playing baseball that was developed by former Major League Baseball manager Whitey Herzog. The term was coined by the press during the 1982 World Series to describe the style of Herzog's St. Louis Cardinals. The team won the Series without a typical power hitter, instead using speed on the base paths, solid pitching, excellent defense, and line drive base hits. Whiteyball was well-suited to the fast, hard AstroTurf surface that Busch Memorial Stadium had at the time, which created large, unpredictable bounces when the ball hit it at sharp angles. In his book "White Rat", Herzog says the approach was a response to the spacious, artificial surface stadiums of the time. He said of the media's dismay at his teams' success:

They seemed to think there was something wrong with the way we played baseball, with speed and defense and line-drive hitters. They called it "Whitey-ball" and said it couldn't last.

— Whitey Herzog

Herzog used this strategy for his team during the 1980s until he left the Cardinals in 1990.

A 2012 sports article described Whiteyball as follows:

The '82 Series marked the start of Whiteyball, the Herzog style which stressed base running and pitching, though Herzog attributes that to the nature of Busch Stadium II, which didn't reward the long ball.

Herzog used many switch-hitters such as Ozzie Smith, Willie McGee, Tom Herr, Terry Pendleton, Vince Coleman, José Oquendo, Garry Templeton, Ted Simmons, Luis Alicea, Mike Ramsey, Tony Scott, and Félix José in St. Louis, along with Willie Wilson and U L Washington when he managed in Kansas City. Kansas City Royals manager Ned Yost used his own version of Whiteyball, often called Royalball, to get to the 2014 World Series, and win the 2015 series.
