= Howard Hilton =

American baseball player (1964–2011)

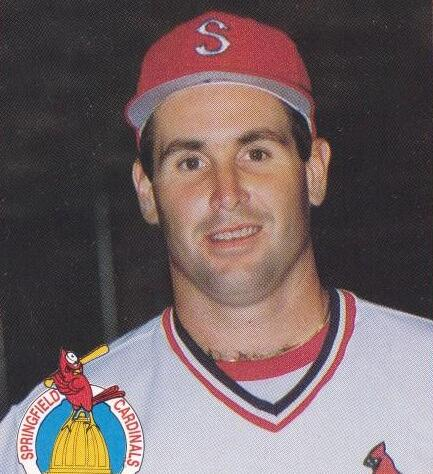
- Hilton with the Springfield Cardinals c. 1987
- Relief pitcher
- Born: January 3, 1964; Oxnard, California, U.S.
- Died: July 12, 2011 (aged 47); Ventura, California, U.S.
- Batted: Right Threw: Right

MLB debut
- April 9, 1990, for the St. Louis Cardinals

Last MLB appearance
- April 11, 1990, for the St. Louis Cardinals

MLB statistics
- Win–loss record: 0–0
- Earned run average: 0.00
- Strikeouts: 2
- Stats at Baseball Reference

Teams
- St. Louis Cardinals (1990)

Howard James Hilton (January 3, 1964 – July 12, 2011) was an American Major League Baseball pitcher who appeared in two games with the St. Louis Cardinals at the start of the 1990 season.

Hilton was born in Oxnard, California, and graduated from Hueneme High School in 1982. He played college baseball for Oxnard College before transferring to the University of Arkansas, and helping pitch the Arkansas Razorbacks, to the 1985 College World Series. Hilton was the starting pitcher in the fourth game in which his team was eliminated in extra innings.

The Cardinals drafted him in the 22nd round of the 1985 Major League Baseball draft. After five seasons in the Cardinals' farm system, in which he went 33–30 with a 2.97 earned run average, Hilton made the team out of Spring training in 1990. During that Spring, he was involved in trade rumors that would have sent him to the Boston Red Sox for closer Lee Smith, but nothing ever materialized (a deal for Smith was eventually reached after the start of the season for Tom Brunansky).

He made his major league debut in the Cards' season opener, pitching 1 1/3 innings without giving up an earned run against the Montreal Expos. He entered the final game of the three-game series with the Expos with one out in the eighth, and finished the game. It turned out to be his final major league appearance before he was optioned back to the triple A Louisville Redbirds.

Hilton was released during Spring training in 1991, and joined the San Diego Padres' organization. He remained with them through 1992.

Hilton died on July 12, 2011, at Ventura County Medical Center in Ventura, California. His death was due to complications from hip surgery.
