= Erik Pappas =

American baseball player and coach (born 1966)

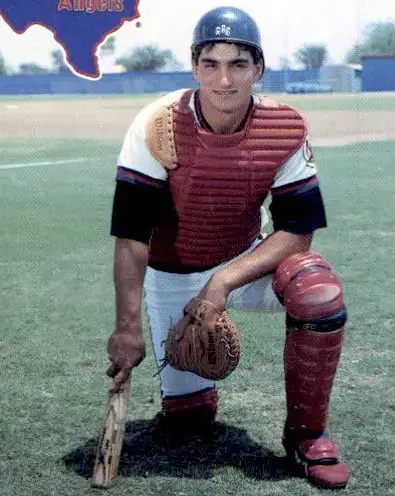
- Pappas with the Midland Angels c. 1988
- Catcher
- Born: April 25, 1966 (age 60); Chicago, Illinois, U.S.
- Batted: Right Threw: Right

MLB debut
- April 19, 1991, for the Chicago Cubs

Last MLB appearance
- April 30, 1994, for the St. Louis Cardinals

MLB statistics
- Batting average: .242
- Home runs: 1
- Runs batted in: 35
- Stats at Baseball Reference

Teams
- Chicago Cubs (1991); St. Louis Cardinals (1993–1994)

Erik Daniel Pappas (born April 25, 1966) is an American former professional baseball player and coach. He played as a catcher in Major League Baseball for the Chicago Cubs and St. Louis Cardinals.

== Baseball career ==
The Chicago native is a 1984 graduate of Mount Carmel High School. Pappas was selected by the California Angels as the 6th overall pick in the first round of the 1984 Major League Baseball draft. He made his major league debut with the Chicago Cubs on April 19, 1991, at the age of 24. He appeared in 8 games for the Cubs during the 1991 season and appeared in a total of 97 games for the Cardinals during 1993 and 1994 seasons. During the 1993 season, he had one home run and 28 RBIs. Pappas played in his final major league game on April 30, 1994, at the age of 28. On August 13, 1996, while a member of the Texas Rangers' Triple-A Oklahoma City 89ers, Pappas caught a perfect game pitched by Rick Helling against the Nashville Sounds.

Pappas, who is of Greek ancestry, was selected to play for the Greek national baseball team in the 2004 Summer Olympics in Athens, Greece. He played for Greece in the 2023 European Baseball Championship.

== Career statistics ==
In a three-year major league career, Pappas played in 104 games, accumulating 70 hits in 289 at bats for a .242 career batting average along with 1 home run, 35 runs batted in and a .342 on-base percentage. He ended his career with a .978 fielding percentage.

== Coaching career ==
After his playing career, Pappas became the hitting coach for the Peoria Chiefs. Pappas spent 2006–12 at the Cangelosi Baseball Academy in Orland Park, Illinois, while also serving as a scout for the Texas Rangers from 2005 to 2009. Pappas became a coach in the Cardinals system as the Springfield Cardinals hitting coach for the 2014 season.

Pappas currently resides in the Beverly neighborhood in Chicago, Illinois.
