= Major League Baseball Player of the Month Award =

Award in Major League Baseball

- Sport: Baseball
- League: Major League Baseball
- Awarded for: Best player of the month in National League and American League
- Country: United States and Canada

History
- First award: 1958 (NL); 1974 (AL)
- Most wins: Barry Bonds (13)
- Most recent: September 2026: Carter Jensen (AL); Elly De La Cruz (NL)

In Major League Baseball (MLB), the Player of the Month Award is given monthly during the regular season to two outstanding players, one each in the National League (NL) and American League (AL). The NL first awarded the honor during the 1958 season, when league president Warren Giles conducted a poll of media members covering the then-eight NL teams and awarded winners an engraved desk set. (Note: The desk set that Giles awarded to early winners featured a clock, a month-and-day calendar, and two pens.) The AL did not issue its own award until 1974. The NL created a Pitcher of the Month Award in 1975 and the AL did likewise in 1979. Pitchers have not been eligible for the Player of the Month Award since then.

== Awards by month ==
Players listed with multiple occurrences are denoted in parentheses:

The most Player of the Month awards won by a single player have been 13 by Barry Bonds. He is followed by Aaron Judge (12), Alex Rodriguez (10), Frank Thomas (8), Albert Pujols (7), and Albert Belle (7).

Year	Month	National League		American League	
Year	Month	Player(s)	Team(s)	Player(s)	Team(s)
=== 1958 to 1959 ===
1958	May	Willie Mays; Stan Musial	San Francisco Giants; St. Louis Cardinals		
1958	June	Frank Thomas	Pittsburgh Pirates		
1958	July	Joey Jay	Milwaukee Braves		
1958	August	Lew Burdette	Milwaukee Braves		
1958	September	Willie Mays (2)	San Francisco Giants		
1959	May	Hank Aaron; Harvey Haddix	Milwaukee Braves; Pittsburgh Pirates		
1959	June	Roy Face	Pittsburgh Pirates		
1959	July	Don Drysdale	Los Angeles Dodgers		
1959	August	Vern Law; Willie McCovey	Pittsburgh Pirates; San Francisco Giants		
1959	September	Eddie Mathews	Milwaukee Braves		
=== 1960 to 1969 ===
1960	May	Roberto Clemente	Pittsburgh Pirates		
1960	June	Lindy McDaniel	St. Louis Cardinals		
1960	July	Don Drysdale (2)	Los Angeles Dodgers		
1960	August	Warren Spahn	Milwaukee Braves		
1960	September	Ken Boyer	St. Louis Cardinals		
1961	May	Joey Jay (2)	Cincinnati Reds		
1961	June	George Altman	Chicago Cubs		
1961	July	Frank Robinson	Cincinnati Reds		
1961	August	Warren Spahn (2)	Milwaukee Braves		
1961	September	Jim O'Toole	Cincinnati Reds		
1962	May	Bob Purkey	Cincinnati Reds		
1962	June	Sandy Koufax	Los Angeles Dodgers		
1962	July	Frank Howard	Los Angeles Dodgers		
1962	August	Jack Sanford	San Francisco Giants		
1963	May	Dick Ellsworth	Chicago Cubs		
1963	June	Ron Santo	Chicago Cubs		
1963	July	Willie McCovey (2)	San Francisco Giants		
1963	August	Willie Mays (3)	San Francisco Giants		
1964	May	Billy Williams	Chicago Cubs		
1964	June	Jim Bunning	Philadelphia Phillies		
1964	July	Ron Santo (2)	Chicago Cubs		
1964	August	Frank Robinson (2)	Cincinnati Reds		
1964	September	Bob Gibson	St. Louis Cardinals		
1965	May	Joe Torre	Milwaukee Braves		
1965	June	Vern Law (2); Willie Stargell	Pittsburgh Pirates		
1965	July	Pete Rose	Cincinnati Reds		
1965	August	Willie Mays (4)	San Francisco Giants		
1966	May	Juan Marichal	San Francisco Giants		
1966	June	Gaylord Perry	San Francisco Giants		
1966	July	Mike Shannon	St. Louis Cardinals		
1966	August	Pete Rose (2)	Cincinnati Reds		
1967	May	Roberto Clemente (2)	Pittsburgh Pirates		
1967	June	Hank Aaron (2)	Atlanta Braves		
1967	July	Jim Ray Hart	San Francisco Giants		
1967	August	Orlando Cepeda	St. Louis Cardinals		
1968	May	Don Drysdale (3)	Los Angeles Dodgers		
1968	June	Bob Gibson (2)	St. Louis Cardinals		
1968	July	Bob Gibson (3)	St. Louis Cardinals		
1968	August	Pete Rose (3)	Cincinnati Reds		
1968	September	Steve Blass	Pittsburgh Pirates		
1969	April	Willie McCovey (3)	San Francisco Giants		
1969	May	Ken Holtzman	Chicago Cubs		
1969	June	Ron Santo (3)	Chicago Cubs		
1969	July	Roberto Clemente (3)	Pittsburgh Pirates		
1969	August	Willie Davis	Los Angeles Dodgers		
=== 1970 to 1979 ===
1970	May	Rico Carty	Atlanta Braves		
1970	June	Tommie Agee	New York Mets		
1970	July	Bill Singer	Los Angeles Dodgers		
1970	August	Bob Gibson (4)	St. Louis Cardinals		
1971	April	Willie Stargell (2)	Pittsburgh Pirates		
1971	May	Lou Brock	St. Louis Cardinals		
1971	June	Willie Stargell (3)	Pittsburgh Pirates		
1971	July	Ferguson Jenkins	Chicago Cubs		
1971	August	Joe Torre (2)	St. Louis Cardinals		
1972	April	Don Sutton	Los Angeles Dodgers		
1972	May	Bob Watson	Houston Astros		
1972	June	César Cedeño	Houston Astros		
1972	July	Billy Williams (2)	Chicago Cubs		
1972	August	Ken Henderson	San Francisco Giants		
1973	April	Jerry Koosman	New York Mets		
1973	May	Willie Crawford	Los Angeles Dodgers		
1973	June	Greg Luzinski	Philadelphia Phillies		
1973	July	Pete Rose (4)	Cincinnati Reds		
1973	August	Davey Johnson	Atlanta Braves		
1974	April	Tommy John	Los Angeles Dodgers	Graig Nettles	New York Yankees
1974	May	Ralph Garr	Atlanta Braves	Rod Carew	Minnesota Twins
1974	June	Buzz Capra	Atlanta Braves	Gaylord Perry (2)	Cleveland Indians
1974	July	Don Gullett	Cincinnati Reds	Doc Medich	New York Yankees
1974	August	Lou Brock (2)	St. Louis Cardinals	Nolan Ryan	California Angels
1974	September			Al Kaline	Detroit Tigers
1975	April	Joe Morgan	Cincinnati Reds	Robin Yount	Milwaukee Brewers
1975	May	Bob Watson (2)	Houston Astros	Jim Hughes	Minnesota Twins
1975	June	Joe Morgan (2)	Cincinnati Reds	Fred Lynn	Boston Red Sox
1975	July	Dave Kingman	New York Mets	John Mayberry	Kansas City Royals
1975	August	Tony Pérez	Cincinnati Reds	Jim Palmer	Baltimore Orioles
1975	September	Andre Thornton	Chicago Cubs	Gene Tenace	Oakland Athletics
1976	April	Mike Schmidt	Philadelphia Phillies	Willie Horton	Detroit Tigers
1976	May	George Foster	Cincinnati Reds	Ron LeFlore	Detroit Tigers
1976	June	Al Oliver	Pittsburgh Pirates	Mark Fidrych	Detroit Tigers
1976	July	George Foster (2)	Cincinnati Reds	Reggie Jackson	Baltimore Orioles
1976	August	Joe Morgan (3)	Cincinnati Reds	Luis Tiant	Boston Red Sox
1976	September	Steve Garvey	Los Angeles Dodgers	Nolan Ryan (2); Frank Tanana	California Angels
1977	April	Ron Cey	Los Angeles Dodgers	Otto Vélez	Toronto Blue Jays
1977	May	Ken Reitz	St. Louis Cardinals	Frank Tanana (2)	California Angels
1977	June	George Foster (3)	Cincinnati Reds	Rod Carew (2)	Minnesota Twins
1977	July	Greg Luzinski (2)	Philadelphia Phillies	Jim Rice	Boston Red Sox
1977	August	George Foster (4)	Cincinnati Reds	Graig Nettles (2)	New York Yankees
1977	September	César Cedeño (2)	Houston Astros	Rod Carew (3)	Minnesota Twins
1978	April	Rick Monday	Los Angeles Dodgers	Frank Tanana (3)	California Angels
1978	May	Jack Clark	San Francisco Giants	Jim Rice (2)	Boston Red Sox
1978	June	Dave Winfield	San Diego Padres	Ron Guidry	New York Yankees
1978	July	Pete Rose (5)	Cincinnati Reds	Doug DeCinces	Baltimore Orioles
1978	August	Dave Parker	Pittsburgh Pirates	Jim Rice (3)	Boston Red Sox
1978	September	Dave Parker (2)	Pittsburgh Pirates	Ron Guidry (2)	New York Yankees
1979	April	George Foster (5)	Cincinnati Reds	Cecil Cooper	Milwaukee Brewers
1979	May	Lou Brock (3)	St. Louis Cardinals	Don Baylor	California Angels
1979	June	George Foster (6)	Cincinnati Reds	Dan Meyer	Seattle Mariners
1979	July	Mike Schmidt (2)	Philadelphia Phillies	Don Baylor (2)	California Angels
1979	August	Keith Hernandez	St. Louis Cardinals	Fred Lynn (2)	Boston Red Sox
1979	September	Pete Rose (6)	Philadelphia Phillies	Alfredo Griffin	Toronto Blue Jays
=== 1980 to 1989 ===
1980	April	Dave Kingman (2)	Chicago Cubs	Lamar Johnson	Chicago White Sox
1980	May	Mike Schmidt (3)	Philadelphia Phillies	Ben Oglivie	Milwaukee Brewers
1980	June	Dusty Baker	Los Angeles Dodgers	Rod Carew (4)	California Angels
1980	July	Bob Horner	Atlanta Braves	George Brett; Reggie Jackson (2)	Kansas City Royals; New York Yankees
1980	August	Dale Murphy	Atlanta Braves	Cecil Cooper (2)	Milwaukee Brewers
1980	September	Gary Carter	Montreal Expos	Eddie Murray; Jim Rice (4)	Baltimore Orioles; Boston Red Sox
1981	April	Dave Concepción	Cincinnati Reds	Ken Singleton	Baltimore Orioles
1981	May	Art Howe	Houston Astros	Dwight Evans	Boston Red Sox
1981	June	1981 Major League Baseball strike			
1981	July	1981 Major League Baseball strike			
1981	August	Mike Schmidt (4)	Philadelphia Phillies	Cecil Cooper (3)	Milwaukee Brewers
1981	September	Gary Matthews	Philadelphia Phillies	Eddie Murray (2); Willie Wilson	Baltimore Orioles; Kansas City Royals
1982	April	Dale Murphy (2)	Atlanta Braves	Eddie Murray (3)	Baltimore Orioles
1982	May	Tim Wallach	Montreal Expos	Hal McRae	Kansas City Royals
1982	June	Al Oliver (2)	Montreal Expos	George Brett (2)	Kansas City Royals
1982	July	Mike Schmidt (5)	Philadelphia Phillies	Robin Yount (2)	Milwaukee Brewers
1982	August	Bill Buckner	Chicago Cubs	Doug DeCinces (2)	California Angels
1982	September	Claudell Washington	Atlanta Braves	Dave Winfield (2)	New York Yankees
1983	April	Terry Kennedy	San Diego Padres	George Brett (3)	Kansas City Royals
1983	May	Darrell Evans	San Francisco Giants	Rod Carew (5)	California Angels
1983	June	Andre Dawson	Montreal Expos	Lou Whitaker	Detroit Tigers
1983	July	Dusty Baker (2)	Los Angeles Dodgers	Cecil Cooper (4)	Milwaukee Brewers
1983	August	Mel Hall	Chicago Cubs	Lloyd Moseby	Toronto Blue Jays
1983	September	Dale Murphy (3)	Atlanta Braves	Cal Ripken Jr.	Baltimore Orioles
1984	April	Tony Gwynn	San Diego Padres	Alan Trammell	Detroit Tigers
1984	May	Leon Durham	Chicago Cubs	Eddie Murray (4)	Baltimore Orioles
1984	June	Ryne Sandberg	Chicago Cubs	Tony Armas	Boston Red Sox
1984	July	José Cruz	Houston Astros	Kent Hrbek	Minnesota Twins
1984	August	Keith Moreland	Chicago Cubs	Gary Ward	Texas Rangers
1984	September	Dale Murphy (4)	Atlanta Braves	Greg Walker	Chicago White Sox
1985	April	Dale Murphy (5)	Atlanta Braves	Mike Davis	Oakland Athletics
1985	May	Dave Parker (3)	Cincinnati Reds	George Brett (4)	Kansas City Royals
1985	June	Pedro Guerrero	Los Angeles Dodgers	Rickey Henderson	New York Yankees
1985	July	Keith Hernandez (2)	New York Mets	George Brett (5)	Kansas City Royals
1985	August	Willie McGee	St. Louis Cardinals	Don Mattingly	New York Yankees
1985	September	Gary Carter (2)	New York Mets	Don Mattingly (2)	New York Yankees
1986	April	Johnny Ray	Pittsburgh Pirates	Kirby Puckett	Minnesota Twins
1986	May	Hubie Brooks	Montreal Expos	Wade Boggs	Boston Red Sox
1986	June	Kevin Bass	Houston Astros	Kent Hrbek (2)	Minnesota Twins
1986	July	Eric Davis	Cincinnati Reds	Scott Fletcher	Texas Rangers
1986	August	Dale Murphy (6)	Atlanta Braves	Doug DeCinces (3)	California Angels
1986	September	Steve Sax	Los Angeles Dodgers	Don Mattingly (3)	New York Yankees
1987	April	Eric Davis (2)	Cincinnati Reds	Brian Downing	California Angels
1987	May	Eric Davis (3)	Cincinnati Reds	Larry Parrish	Texas Rangers
1987	June	Tony Gwynn (2)	San Diego Padres	Wade Boggs (2)	Boston Red Sox
1987	July	Bo Díaz	Cincinnati Reds	Don Mattingly (4)	New York Yankees
1987	August	Andre Dawson (2)	Chicago Cubs	Dwight Evans (2)	Boston Red Sox
1987	September	Darryl Strawberry	New York Mets	Alan Trammell (2)	Detroit Tigers
1988	April	Bobby Bonilla	Pittsburgh Pirates	Dave Winfield (3)	New York Yankees
1988	May	Bobby Bonilla (2)	Pittsburgh Pirates	Carney Lansford	Oakland Athletics
1988	June	Will Clark	San Francisco Giants	Mike Greenwell	Boston Red Sox
1988	July	Tony Gwynn (3)	San Diego Padres	Chili Davis	California Angels
1988	August	Eric Davis (4)	Cincinnati Reds	Kent Hrbek (3)	Minnesota Twins
1988	September	Kevin McReynolds	New York Mets	José Canseco	Oakland Athletics
1989	April	Von Hayes	Philadelphia Phillies	Fred McGriff	Toronto Blue Jays
1989	May	Will Clark (2)	San Francisco Giants	Ron Kittle	Chicago White Sox
1989	June	Howard Johnson	New York Mets	Rubén Sierra	Texas Rangers
1989	July	Mark Grace	Chicago Cubs	Robin Yount (3)	Milwaukee Brewers
1989	August	Pedro Guerrero (2)	St. Louis Cardinals	George Bell; Nick Esasky	Toronto Blue Jays; Boston Red Sox
1989	September	Will Clark (3)	San Francisco Giants	Paul Molitor	Milwaukee Brewers
=== 1990 to 1999 ===
1990	April	Bobby Bonilla (3)	Pittsburgh Pirates	Ken Griffey Jr.	Seattle Mariners
1990	May	Andre Dawson (3)	Chicago Cubs	José Canseco (2)	Oakland Athletics
1990	June	Ryne Sandberg (2)	Chicago Cubs	Brook Jacoby	Cleveland Indians
1990	July	Barry Bonds	Pittsburgh Pirates	George Brett (6)	Kansas City Royals
1990	August	David Justice	Atlanta Braves	Cecil Fielder	Detroit Tigers
1990	September	Kal Daniels	Los Angeles Dodgers	Kelly Gruber	Toronto Blue Jays
1991	April	Félix José	St. Louis Cardinals	Dave Henderson	Oakland Athletics
1991	May	David Justice (2)	Atlanta Braves	Rubén Sierra (2)	Texas Rangers
1991	June	Barry Larkin	Cincinnati Reds	Joe Carter	Toronto Blue Jays
1991	July	Barry Bonds (2)	Pittsburgh Pirates	Robin Ventura	Chicago White Sox
1991	August	Will Clark (4)	San Francisco Giants	Frank Thomas	Chicago White Sox
1991	September	Howard Johnson (2)	New York Mets	Cal Ripken Jr. (2)	Baltimore Orioles
1992	April	Barry Bonds (3)	Pittsburgh Pirates	Roberto Alomar	Toronto Blue Jays
1992	May	Félix José (2)	St. Louis Cardinals	Kirby Puckett (2)	Minnesota Twins
1992	June	Cory Snyder	San Francisco Giants	Kirby Puckett (3)	Minnesota Twins
1992	July	Brett Butler	Los Angeles Dodgers	Edgar Martínez	Seattle Mariners
1992	August	Gary Sheffield	San Diego Padres	Edgar Martínez (2)	Seattle Mariners
1992	September	Barry Bonds (4)	Pittsburgh Pirates	Frank Thomas (2)	Chicago White Sox
1993	April	Barry Bonds (5)	San Francisco Giants	John Olerud	Toronto Blue Jays
1993	May	Jeff Bagwell	Houston Astros	Paul Molitor (2)	Toronto Blue Jays
1993	June	Andrés Galarraga	Colorado Rockies	John Olerud (2)	Toronto Blue Jays
1993	July	Fred McGriff (2)	San Diego Padres	Rafael Palmeiro	Texas Rangers
1993	August	Tony Gwynn (4)	San Diego Padres	Frank Thomas (3)	Chicago White Sox
1993	September	Andrés Galarraga (2)	Colorado Rockies	Chris Hoiles	Baltimore Orioles
1994	April	Ellis Burks	Colorado Rockies	Joe Carter (2)	Toronto Blue Jays
1994	May	Lenny Dykstra; Mike Piazza	Philadelphia Phillies; Los Angeles Dodgers	Frank Thomas (4)	Chicago White Sox
1994	June	Jeff Bagwell (2)	Houston Astros	Albert Belle	Cleveland Indians
1994	July	Jeff Bagwell (3)	Houston Astros	Frank Thomas (5)	Chicago White Sox
1994	August	1994–95 Major League Baseball strike			
1994	September	1994–95 Major League Baseball strike			
1995	April	1994–95 Major League Baseball strike			
1995	May	Matt Williams	San Francisco Giants	Manny Ramirez	Cleveland Indians
1995	June	Jeff Conine	Florida Marlins	Edgar Martínez (3)	Seattle Mariners
1995	July	Dante Bichette	Colorado Rockies	Garret Anderson	California Angels
1995	August	Mike Piazza (2)	Los Angeles Dodgers	Albert Belle (2)	Cleveland Indians
1995	September	Dante Bichette (2)	Colorado Rockies	Albert Belle (3)	Cleveland Indians
1996	April	Barry Bonds (6)	San Francisco Giants	Frank Thomas (6)	Chicago White Sox
1996	May	Jeff Bagwell (4)	Houston Astros	Mo Vaughn	Boston Red Sox
1996	June	Dante Bichette (3)	Colorado Rockies	Mark McGwire	Oakland Athletics
1996	July	Sammy Sosa	Chicago Cubs	Juan González	Texas Rangers
1996	August	Ken Caminiti	San Diego Padres	Alex Rodriguez	Seattle Mariners
1996	September	Ken Caminiti (2)	San Diego Padres	Frank Thomas (7)	Chicago White Sox
1997	April	Larry Walker	Colorado Rockies	Ken Griffey Jr. (2)	Seattle Mariners
1997	May	Tony Gwynn (5)	San Diego Padres	Frank Thomas (8)	Chicago White Sox
1997	June	Mike Piazza (3)	Los Angeles Dodgers	Jeff King	Kansas City Royals
1997	July	Barry Bonds (7)	San Francisco Giants	Tim Salmon	Anaheim Angels
1997	August	Mike Piazza (4)	Los Angeles Dodgers	Bernie Williams	New York Yankees
1997	September	Mark McGwire (2)	St. Louis Cardinals	Juan González (2)	Texas Rangers
1998	April	Mark McGwire (3)	St. Louis Cardinals	Iván Rodríguez	Texas Rangers
1998	May	Mark McGwire (4)	St. Louis Cardinals	Bernie Williams (2)	New York Yankees
1998	June	Sammy Sosa (2)	Chicago Cubs	Rafael Palmeiro (2)	Baltimore Orioles
1998	July	Vladimir Guerrero	Montreal Expos	Albert Belle (4)	Chicago White Sox
1998	August	Jeff Kent	San Francisco Giants	Derek Jeter	New York Yankees
1998	September	Mark McGwire (5)	St. Louis Cardinals	Albert Belle (5)	Chicago White Sox
1999	April	Matt Williams (2)	Arizona Diamondbacks	Manny Ramirez (2)	Cleveland Indians
1999	May	Sammy Sosa (3)	Chicago Cubs	Nomar Garciaparra	Boston Red Sox
1999	June	Jeromy Burnitz	Milwaukee Brewers	Rafael Palmeiro (3)	Texas Rangers
1999	July	Mark McGwire (6)	St. Louis Cardinals	Joe Randa	Kansas City Royals
1999	August	Vladimir Guerrero (2)	Montreal Expos	Rafael Palmeiro (4); Iván Rodríguez (2)	Texas Rangers
1999	September	Greg Vaughn	Cincinnati Reds	Albert Belle (6)	Baltimore Orioles
=== 2000 to 2009 ===
2000	April	Vladimir Guerrero (3)	Montreal Expos	Jermaine Dye	Kansas City Royals
2000	May	Todd Helton	Colorado Rockies	Edgar Martínez (4)	Seattle Mariners
2000	June	Jeff Kent (2)	San Francisco Giants	Albert Belle (7)	Baltimore Orioles
2000	July	Sammy Sosa (4)	Chicago Cubs	Johnny Damon	Kansas City Royals
2000	August	Todd Helton (2)	Colorado Rockies	Glenallen Hill	New York Yankees
2000	September	Richard Hidalgo	Houston Astros	Jason Giambi	Oakland Athletics
2001	April	Luis Gonzalez	Arizona Diamondbacks	Manny Ramirez (3)	Boston Red Sox
2001	May	Barry Bonds (8)	San Francisco Giants	Jason Giambi (2)	Oakland Athletics
2001	June	Luis Gonzalez (2)	Arizona Diamondbacks	Mike Sweeney	Kansas City Royals
2001	July	Jeff Bagwell (5)	Houston Astros	Jim Thome	Cleveland Indians
2001	August	Sammy Sosa (5)	Chicago Cubs	Jermaine Dye (2)	Oakland Athletics
2001	September	Barry Bonds (9)	San Francisco Giants	Eric Chavez	Oakland Athletics
2002	April	Vladimir Guerrero (4)	Montreal Expos	Torii Hunter	Minnesota Twins
2002	May	Todd Helton (3)	Colorado Rockies	Jason Giambi (3)	New York Yankees
2002	June	Jeff Kent (3)	San Francisco Giants	Paul Konerko	Chicago White Sox
2002	July	Larry Walker (2)	Colorado Rockies	Alex Rodriguez (2)	Texas Rangers
2002	August	Barry Bonds (10)	San Francisco Giants	Alex Rodriguez (3)	Texas Rangers
2002	September	Brian Jordan	Los Angeles Dodgers	Manny Ramirez (4)	Boston Red Sox
2003	April	Todd Helton (4)	Colorado Rockies	Alfonso Soriano	New York Yankees
2003	May	Albert Pujols	St. Louis Cardinals	Edgar Martínez (5)	Seattle Mariners
2003	June	Albert Pujols (2)	St. Louis Cardinals	Jason Giambi (4)	New York Yankees
2003	July	Barry Bonds (11)	San Francisco Giants	Magglio Ordóñez	Chicago White Sox
2003	August	Vladimir Guerrero (5)	Montreal Expos	Alex Rodriguez (4)	Texas Rangers
2003	September	Jim Thome (2)	Philadelphia Phillies	Alfonso Soriano (2)	New York Yankees
2004	April	Barry Bonds (12)	San Francisco Giants	Carlos Beltrán	Kansas City Royals
2004	May	Lance Berkman	Houston Astros	Melvin Mora	Baltimore Orioles
2004	June	Jim Thome (3)	Philadelphia Phillies	Iván Rodríguez (3)	Detroit Tigers
2004	July	Jim Edmonds	St. Louis Cardinals	Mark Teixeira	Texas Rangers
2004	August	Barry Bonds (13)	San Francisco Giants	Ichiro Suzuki	Seattle Mariners
2004	September	Adrián Beltré	Los Angeles Dodgers	Vladimir Guerrero (6)	Anaheim Angels
2005	April	Derrek Lee	Chicago Cubs	Brian Roberts	Baltimore Orioles
2005	May	Bobby Abreu	Philadelphia Phillies	Alex Rodriguez (5)	New York Yankees
2005	June	Andruw Jones	Atlanta Braves	Travis Hafner	Cleveland Indians
2005	July	Adam Dunn	Cincinnati Reds	Jason Giambi (5)	New York Yankees
2005	August	Andruw Jones (2)	Atlanta Braves	Alex Rodriguez (6)	New York Yankees
2005	September	Randy Winn	San Francisco Giants	David Ortiz	Boston Red Sox
2006	April	Albert Pujols (3)	St. Louis Cardinals	Jason Giambi (6)	New York Yankees
2006	May	Jason Bay	Pittsburgh Pirates	Alex Rodriguez (7)	New York Yankees
2006	June	David Wright	New York Mets	Joe Mauer	Minnesota Twins
2006	July	Chase Utley	Philadelphia Phillies	David Ortiz (2)	Boston Red Sox
2006	August	Ryan Howard	Philadelphia Phillies	Travis Hafner (2)	Cleveland Indians
2006	September	Ryan Howard (2)	Philadelphia Phillies	Robinson Canó	New York Yankees
2007	April	José Reyes	New York Mets	Alex Rodriguez (8)	New York Yankees
2007	May	Prince Fielder	Milwaukee Brewers	Justin Morneau	Minnesota Twins
2007	June	Alfonso Soriano (3)	Chicago Cubs	Alex Rodriguez (9)	New York Yankees
2007	July	Ryan Braun	Milwaukee Brewers	Hideki Matsui	New York Yankees
2007	August	Mark Teixeira (2)	Atlanta Braves	Magglio Ordóñez (2)	Detroit Tigers
2007	September	Matt Holliday	Colorado Rockies	David Ortiz (3)	Boston Red Sox
2008	April	Chase Utley (2)	Philadelphia Phillies	Josh Hamilton	Texas Rangers
2008	May	Lance Berkman (2)	Houston Astros	Josh Hamilton (2)	Texas Rangers
2008	June	Hanley Ramírez	Florida Marlins	J. D. Drew	Boston Red Sox
2008	July	Ryan Braun (2)	Milwaukee Brewers	Miguel Cabrera	Detroit Tigers
2008	August	Manny Ramirez (5)	Los Angeles Dodgers	Melvin Mora (2)	Baltimore Orioles
2008	September	Ryan Howard (3)	Philadelphia Phillies	Shin-Soo Choo	Cleveland Indians
2009	April	Albert Pujols (4)	St. Louis Cardinals	Evan Longoria	Tampa Bay Rays
2009	May	Justin Upton	Arizona Diamondbacks	Joe Mauer (2)	Minnesota Twins
2009	June	Albert Pujols (5)	St. Louis Cardinals	B. J. Upton	Tampa Bay Rays
2009	July	Ryan Ludwick	St. Louis Cardinals	Bobby Abreu	Los Angeles Angels
2009	August	Ryan Howard (4)	Philadelphia Phillies	Kendrys Morales	Los Angeles Angels
2009	September	Derrek Lee (2)	Chicago Cubs	Billy Butler	Kansas City Royals
=== 2010 to 2019 ===
2010	April	Kelly Johnson	Arizona Diamondbacks	Robinson Canó (2)	New York Yankees
2010	May	Troy Glaus	Atlanta Braves	David Ortiz (4)	Boston Red Sox
2010	June	David Wright (2)	New York Mets	Josh Hamilton (3)	Texas Rangers
2010	July	Buster Posey	San Francisco Giants	Delmon Young; José Bautista	Minnesota Twins; Toronto Blue Jays
2010	August	Albert Pujols (6)	St. Louis Cardinals	José Bautista (2)	Toronto Blue Jays
2010	September	Troy Tulowitzki	Colorado Rockies	Alex Rodriguez (10)	New York Yankees
2011	April	Ryan Braun (3)	Milwaukee Brewers	José Bautista (3)	Toronto Blue Jays
2011	May	Jay Bruce	Cincinnati Reds	José Bautista (4)	Toronto Blue Jays
2011	June	Prince Fielder (2)	Milwaukee Brewers	Adrián González	Boston Red Sox
2011	July	Emilio Bonifacio	Florida Marlins	Dustin Pedroia	Boston Red Sox
2011	August	Dan Uggla	Atlanta Braves	Curtis Granderson	New York Yankees
2011	September	Ryan Braun (4)	Milwaukee Brewers	Adrián Beltré (2)	Texas Rangers
2012	April	Matt Kemp	Los Angeles Dodgers	Josh Hamilton (4)	Texas Rangers
2012	May	Giancarlo Stanton	Miami Marlins	Josh Hamilton (5)	Texas Rangers
2012	June	Andrew McCutchen	Pittsburgh Pirates	José Bautista (5)	Toronto Blue Jays
2012	July	Andrew McCutchen (2)	Pittsburgh Pirates	Mike Trout	Los Angeles Angels
2012	August	Chase Headley	San Diego Padres	Miguel Cabrera (2)	Detroit Tigers
2012	September	Chase Headley (2)	San Diego Padres	Adrián Beltré (3)	Texas Rangers
2013	April	Justin Upton (2)	Atlanta Braves	Chris Davis	Baltimore Orioles
2013	May	Domonic Brown	Philadelphia Phillies	Miguel Cabrera (3)	Detroit Tigers
2013	June	Yasiel Puig	Los Angeles Dodgers	Jason Kipnis	Cleveland Indians
2013	July	Jayson Werth	Washington Nationals	Adrián Beltré (4)	Texas Rangers
2013	August	Martín Prado	Arizona Diamondbacks	Miguel Cabrera (4)	Detroit Tigers
2013	September	Hunter Pence	San Francisco Giants	Josh Donaldson	Oakland Athletics
2014	April	Troy Tulowitzki (2)	Colorado Rockies	José Abreu	Chicago White Sox
2014	May	Yasiel Puig (2)	Los Angeles Dodgers	Edwin Encarnación	Toronto Blue Jays
2014	June	Andrew McCutchen (3)	Pittsburgh Pirates	Mike Trout (2)	Los Angeles Angels
2014	July	Jayson Werth (2)	Washington Nationals	José Abreu (2)	Chicago White Sox
2014	August	Josh Harrison	Pittsburgh Pirates	Víctor Martínez	Detroit Tigers
2014	September	Matt Kemp (2)	Los Angeles Dodgers	Miguel Cabrera (5)	Detroit Tigers
2015	April	Adrián González (2)	Los Angeles Dodgers	Nelson Cruz	Seattle Mariners
2015	May	Bryce Harper	Washington Nationals	Jason Kipnis (2)	Cleveland Indians
2015	June	Giancarlo Stanton (2)	Miami Marlins	Albert Pujols (7)	Los Angeles Angels
2015	July	Carlos González	Colorado Rockies	Mike Trout (3)	Los Angeles Angels
2015	August	Andrew McCutchen (4)	Pittsburgh Pirates	Edwin Encarnación (2)	Toronto Blue Jays
2015	September	Nolan Arenado	Colorado Rockies	Shin-Soo Choo (2)	Texas Rangers
2016	April	Bryce Harper (2)	Washington Nationals	Manny Machado	Baltimore Orioles
2016	May	Daniel Murphy	Washington Nationals	Jackie Bradley Jr.	Boston Red Sox
2016	June	Wil Myers	San Diego Padres	Jose Altuve	Houston Astros
2016	July	Daniel Murphy]] (2)	Washington Nationals	Mookie Betts	Boston Red Sox
2016	August	Kris Bryant	Chicago Cubs	Gary Sánchez	New York Yankees
2016	September	Freddie Freeman	Atlanta Braves	Miguel Cabrera (6)	Detroit Tigers
2017	April	Ryan Zimmerman	Washington Nationals	Mike Trout (4)	Los Angeles Angels
2017	May	Charlie Blackmon	Colorado Rockies	Carlos Correa	Houston Astros
2017	June	Andrew McCutchen (5)	Pittsburgh Pirates	Aaron Judge	New York Yankees
2017	July	Nolan Arenado (2)	Colorado Rockies	Jose Altuve (2)	Houston Astros
2017	August	Giancarlo Stanton (3)	Miami Marlins	Manny Machado (2)	Baltimore Orioles
2017	September	J. D. Martinez	Arizona Diamondbacks	Aaron Judge (2)	New York Yankees
2018	April	A. J. Pollock	Arizona Diamondbacks	Didi Gregorius	New York Yankees
2018	May	Scooter Gennett	Cincinnati Reds	Francisco Lindor	Cleveland Indians
2018	June	Paul Goldschmidt	Arizona Diamondbacks	Alex Bregman	Houston Astros
2018	July	Matt Carpenter	St. Louis Cardinals	José Ramírez	Cleveland Indians
2018	August	Justin Turner	Los Angeles Dodgers	J. D. Martinez (2)	Boston Red Sox
2018	September	Christian Yelich	Milwaukee Brewers	Mike Trout (5)	Los Angeles Angels
2019	April	Cody Bellinger	Los Angeles Dodgers	Tim Anderson	Chicago White Sox
2019	May	Josh Bell	Pittsburgh Pirates	Rafael Devers	Boston Red Sox
2019	June	Charlie Blackmon (2)	Colorado Rockies	DJ LeMahieu	New York Yankees
2019	July	Paul Goldschmidt (2)	St. Louis Cardinals	Yuli Gurriel	Houston Astros
2019	August	Aristides Aquino	Cincinnati Reds	Alex Bregman (2)	Houston Astros
2019	September	Eugenio Suárez	Cincinnati Reds	Austin Meadows	Tampa Bay Rays
=== 2020 to present ===
2020	July/August	Fernando Tatis Jr.	San Diego Padres	José Abreu (3)	Chicago White Sox
2020	September	Freddie Freeman (2)	Atlanta Braves	José Ramírez (2)	Cleveland Indians
2021	April	Ronald Acuña Jr.	Atlanta Braves	Byron Buxton	Minnesota Twins
2021	May	Fernando Tatís Jr. (2)	San Diego Padres	Marcus Semien	Toronto Blue Jays
2021	June	Kyle Schwarber	Washington Nationals	Shohei Ohtani	Los Angeles Angels
2021	July	Joey Votto	Cincinnati Reds	Shohei Ohtani (2)	Los Angeles Angels
2021	August	C. J. Cron	Colorado Rockies	José Abreu (4)	Chicago White Sox
2021	September	Tyler O'Neill	St. Louis Cardinals	Kyle Tucker	Houston Astros
2022	April	Nolan Arenado (3)	St. Louis Cardinals	José Ramírez (3)	Cleveland Guardians
2022	May	Paul Goldschmidt (3)	St. Louis Cardinals	Aaron Judge (3)	New York Yankees
2022	June	Kyle Schwarber (2)	Philadelphia Phillies	Yordan Alvarez	Houston Astros
2022	July	Austin Riley	Atlanta Braves	Aaron Judge (4)	New York Yankees
2022	August	Nolan Arenado (4)	St. Louis Cardinals	Alex Bregman (3)	Houston Astros
2022	September	Eduardo Escobar	New York Mets	Aaron Judge (5)	New York Yankees
2023	April	Ronald Acuña Jr. (2)	Atlanta Braves	Matt Chapman	Toronto Blue Jays
2023	May	Freddie Freeman (3)	Los Angeles Dodgers	Aaron Judge (6)	New York Yankees
2023	June	Ronald Acuña Jr. (3)	Atlanta Braves	Shohei Ohtani (3)	Los Angeles Angels
2023	July	Cody Bellinger (2)	Chicago Cubs	Shohei Ohtani (4)	Los Angeles Angels
2023	August	Mookie Betts (2)	Los Angeles Dodgers	Julio Rodríguez	Seattle Mariners
2023	September	Ronald Acuña Jr. (4)	Atlanta Braves	Yordan Alvarez (2)	Houston Astros
2024	April	Mookie Betts (3)	Los Angeles Dodgers	Gunnar Henderson	Baltimore Orioles
2024	May	Bryce Harper (3)	Philadelphia Phillies	Aaron Judge (7)	New York Yankees
2024	June	Bryce Harper (4)	Philadelphia Phillies	Aaron Judge (8)	New York Yankees
2024	July	Brenton Doyle	Colorado Rockies	Bobby Witt Jr.	Kansas City Royals
2024	August	Corbin Carroll	Arizona Diamondbacks	Aaron Judge (9)	New York Yankees
2024	September	Shohei Ohtani (5)	Los Angeles Dodgers	Wyatt Langford	Texas Rangers
2025	April	Pete Alonso	New York Mets	Aaron Judge (10)	New York Yankees
2025	May	Shohei Ohtani (6)	Los Angeles Dodgers	Aaron Judge (11)	New York Yankees
2025	June	Juan Soto	New York Mets	Cal Raleigh	Seattle Mariners
2025	July	Kyle Stowers	Miami Marlins	Nick Kurtz	Athletics
2025	August	Brice Turang	Milwaukee Brewers	Shea Langeliers	Athletics
2025	September	Daylen Lile	Washington Nationals	Aaron Judge (12)	New York Yankees
2026	April	Ildemaro Vargas	Arizona Diamondbacks	Yordan Alvarez (3)	Houston Astros
2026	May	JJ Bleday	Cincinnati Reds	Nick Kurtz (2)	Athletics
2026	June	Pete Crow-Armstrong	Chicago Cubs	Junior Caminero	Tampa Bay Rays
2026	July	CJ Abrams	Washington Nationals	Yordan Alvarez (4)	Houston Astros
2026	August	Pete Crow-Armstrong (2)	Chicago Cubs	Jac Caglianone	Kansas City Royals
2026	September	Elly De La Cruz	Cincinnati Reds	Carter Jensen	Kansas City Royals

== See also ==
- Baseball awards § Monthly and weekly awards
- List of MLB awards
