= Fitch Park =

Sports facility in Mesa, Arizona

- Interactive map of Fitch Park
- Location: 1 East 8th Street; Mesa, Arizona; United States
- Coordinates: 33.428285°N 111.829762°W
- Owner: The City of Mesa
- Operator: Athletics
- Surface: Grass

Construction
- Opened: 1997
- Renovated: 2014
- Architect: Gensler (2014)
- General contractor: W.E. O’Neil Construction (2014)

Tenants
- Athletics (MLB) (MiLB spring training) (2015–present); Arizona League Athletics (AZL) (2015–present); Chicago Cubs (MLB) (MiLB spring training) (1997–2013)

Fitch Park is a baseball park complex and training facility located in Mesa, Arizona. It is the spring training workout facility for Major League Baseball's Athletics. It is also the year-round home for the Athletics' minor league training and player development operations, the home ballpark of the Arizona League Athletics, and the spring training home for the Athletics' minor league affiliates.

The Chicago Cubs used the baseball fields and training facility in the same capacities from 1997 to 2013.

Prior to the Athletics' use, the training facility, renamed the Lew Wolff Training Complex, was renovated and expanded to 55,433 square feet (5,149.9 m^{2}). The building's exterior and interior were remodeled to reflect Oakland's green and gold color scheme. The playing fields, pitcher's mounds, and batting cages were also improved to meet the team's needs.
