= Gerónimo Peña =

Dominican baseball player (born 1967)

- Second baseman
- Born: March 29, 1967 (age 59); Distrito Nacional, Dominican Republic
- Batted: Switch Threw: Right

MLB debut
- September 5, 1990, for the St. Louis Cardinals

Last MLB appearance
- September 29, 1996, for the Cleveland Indians

MLB statistics
- Batting average: .262
- Home runs: 30
- Runs batted in: 124
- Stats at Baseball Reference

Teams
- St. Louis Cardinals (1990–1995); Cleveland Indians (1996)

Gerónimo Peña Martínez (born March 29, 1967) is a Dominican former professional baseball second baseman who played in Major League Baseball (MLB) for the St. Louis Cardinals and Cleveland Indians from 1990 to 1996.

== Playing career ==
Gerónimo Peña made his major league debut on September 5, 1990, for the St. Louis Cardinals versus the Montreal Expos, collecting his first major league hit.

In 1991, Peña appeared in a career-high 104 games, scored 38 runs and stole 15 bases, both also career-highs, and batted .262 with eight doubles, three triples, five home runs, and 17 runs batted in (RBI).

In 1992, Peña hit career-bests of .305 and .863 on-base plus slugging (OPS) in 62 games and 236 plate appearances.

In 1994, Peña hit .254/.344/.479 for an .823 OPS over 83 games, hitting career-highs of 11 home runs and 34 RBI.

On July 1, 1996, the Cardinals released Peña, making him a free agent. He signed with the Cleveland Indians that same day.

In 378 games over seven major league seasons, Gerónimo Peña batted .262 (265-for-1010) with 162 runs scored, 30 home runs, 124 RBI, 54 stolen bases and 112 walks. On defense, he played 300 games at second base, and four each at third base and left field.

== Personal life ==
Peña's nephew, Ramses Peña, is also a professional baseball player, having signed with the Pittsburgh Pirates in 2009. His son, Jeremy Peña, is a shortstop and World Series MVP who plays for the Houston Astros and made his MLB debut in 2022. The Peña family moved to Providence, Rhode Island when Jeremy was nine.

== See also ==
- List of Major League Baseball players from the Dominican Republic
