= Arizona Complex League Angels =

- (1989–1996, 2001–present); Tempe, Arizona; previously in Mesa, Arizona (1989–1996, 2001–2005)

Minor league affiliations
- Class: Rookie
- League: Arizona Complex League
- Division: Central
- Previous leagues: Arizona League (1989–1996, 2001–2020)

Major league affiliations
- Team: Los Angeles Angels

Minor league titles
- League titles (1): 2025

Team data
- Name: ACL Angels
- Previous names: AZL Angels (1989–1996, 2001–2020)
- Ballpark: Tempe Diablo Stadium (2006–present)
- Previous parks: Gene Autry Park (1989–1996, 2001–2005)
- Manager: Hainley Statia

The Arizona Complex League Angels are a professional baseball team competing as a Rookie-level affiliate of the Los Angeles Angels in the Arizona Complex League (ACL) of Minor League Baseball. The team plays its home games at Tempe Diablo Stadium in Tempe, Arizona. The team is composed mainly of players who are in their first year of professional baseball either as draftees or non-drafted free agents from the United States, Canada, Dominican Republic, Venezuela, and other countries.

The ACL Angels won the ACL championship in 2025.

== History ==
The team first competed as member of the Arizona League (AZL) from 1989 to 1996. After a four-year absence, the team returned in 2001 and have remained members of the league since. Through 2005, they played at Gene Autry Park in nearby Mesa. Since 2006, the team uses Tempe Diablo Stadium for night games and plays day games in the neighboring minor league complex. Prior to the 2021 season, the Arizona League was renamed as the Arizona Complex League (ACL). The ACL Angels won the ACL championship in 2025.

== Roster ==
Arizona Complex League Angels roster
Players	Coaches/Other
Pitchers: -- Tyler Bremner; -- Mikey Cascino; 53 Milleran Cedano; 83 Andres Cova; 74 Dioris De La Rosa; -- C. J. Gray; -- Jakob Guardado; -- Talon Haley; 66 Jan Hechavarria; -- Luke Lacourse; -- Davidxon Lara; -- Lucas Mahlstedt; 86 Haminton Mendez; -- Xavier Mitchell; -- Cole Raymond; -- Chase Shores; -- Johnny Slawinski; -- Nate Snead; 76 Marco Vega; -- Brayan Vergara; Catchers: -- Yeremi Villahermosa; Infielders: 65 Edgar Alfonso; 71 Athanael Duarte; -- Alec Gomez; 57 Joswa Lugo; -- Kendrey Maduro; 87 Anyelo Marquez; 35 Bryan Martinez; 79 Felix Morrobel; 85 Luis Rodriguez; 99 Victor Rodriguez; -- Kason Siguenza; -- Ivan Tatis; -- Ryland Zaborowski; Outfielders: 67 Samil Dishmey; -- Edwardo Espinal; -- TJ Ford; -- Aaron Graeber; -- Gage Harrelson; -- Jeffery Heard; -- LeTrey McCollum; -- Jonny McGill	Manager: -- Hainley Statia; Coaches: -- Gil Heredia (pitching); -- Ever Magallanes (coach); -- Eddie Menchaca (hitting); -- Trevor Nyp (performance); -- Ron Villone (pitching); 7-day injured list; * On Los Angeles Angels 40-man roster; ~ Development list; # Rehab assignment; ∞ Reserve list; ‡ Restricted list; § Suspended list; † Temporarily inactive list; Roster updated March 27, 2026; Transactions; → More rosters: MiLB • Arizona Complex League; → Los Angeles Angels minor league players
