= Willie McGee =

American baseball player and coach (born 1958)

- McGee with the St. Louis Cardinals in 1983
- Outfielder
- Born: November 2, 1958 (age 67); San Francisco, California, U.S.
- Batted: Switch Threw: Right

MLB debut
- May 10, 1982, for the St. Louis Cardinals

Last MLB appearance
- October 3, 1999, for the St. Louis Cardinals

MLB statistics
- Batting average: .295
- Hits: 2,254
- Home runs: 79
- Runs batted in: 856
- Stats at Baseball Reference

Teams
- As player: St. Louis Cardinals (1982–1990); Oakland Athletics (1990); San Francisco Giants (1991–1994); Boston Red Sox (1995); St. Louis Cardinals (1996–1999); As coach: St. Louis Cardinals (2018–2024)

Career highlights and awards
- 4× All-Star (1983, 1985, 1987, 1988); World Series champion (1982); NL MVP (1985); 3× Gold Glove Award (1983, 1985, 1986); Silver Slugger Award (1985); 2× NL batting champion (1985, 1990); St. Louis Cardinals Hall of Fame

Willie Dean McGee (born November 2, 1958) is an American professional baseball adviser and former outfielder who is a special assistant to the president of baseball operations for the St. Louis Cardinals of Major League Baseball (MLB). He played 18 seasons in MLB for the Cardinals, Oakland Athletics, San Francisco Giants, and Boston Red Sox from 1982 to 1999. He won two batting titles and was named Major League Baseball's 1985 National League MVP. McGee primarily played center field and right field, winning three Gold Glove Awards for defensive excellence. He spent the majority of his career playing for the Cardinals, helping them win the 1982 World Series with his outstanding performance in Game 3. A four-time All-Star, McGee accumulated 2,254 hits during his career.

== Early life ==
Willie Dean McGee, one of seven children, grew up in a devoutly religious household. His father Hurdice was both a machinist at the Oakland Naval Yards and a deacon in the Pentecostal church. Hurdice did not want his son to play any organized sports on Sundays, so McGee slipped out of the house on Sunday afternoons to pursue his passion for sports. Much later, McGee learned that his father knew that he was sneaking out to play baseball but decided to let him go anyway.

== Playing career ==
=== Early career ===
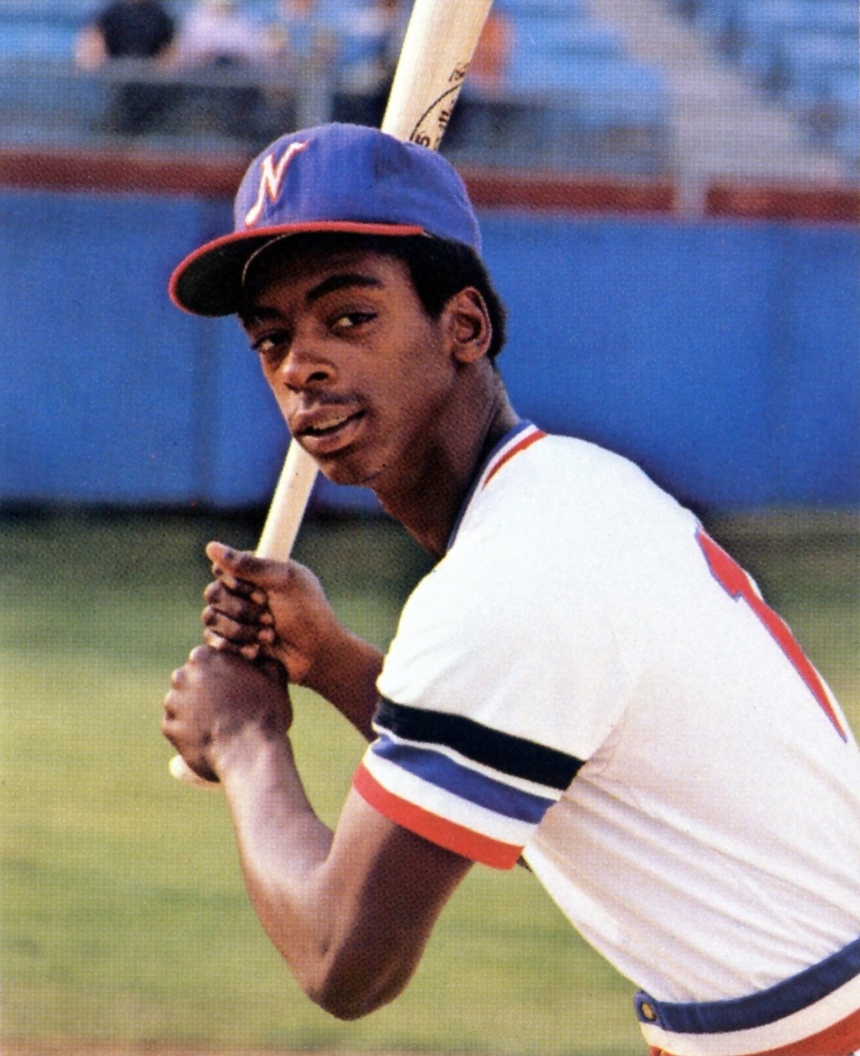
McGee with the Nashville Sounds in 1980

Upon graduating from Harry Ells High School in Richmond, California, in 1976, McGee was selected in the seventh round (152nd overall) of the June amateur entry draft by the Chicago White Sox. McGee declined the White Sox contract offer and opted instead to attend Diablo Valley Community College. A few months later, McGee was selected by the New York Yankees in the 1st round (15th overall) of the 1977 January amateur entry draft. From 1977 through 1981, McGee played in the Yankees' minor league farm system, ascending to the Class AA level.

McGee was acquired by the St. Louis Cardinals from the Yankees' farm system on October 21, 1981, in a trade for pitcher Bob Sykes. In 1982, he was briefly assigned to the AAA Louisville Redbirds.

=== 1982–1989 ===
The Cardinals promoted McGee to the major leagues during the 1982 season. In his rookie year, McGee batted .296, with 4 home runs and 56 runs batted in (RBIs) during the regular season.

I don't know if anyone has ever played a better World Series game than Willie. If he doesn't make that catch in the ninth, Mr. Sutter's in trouble.

— Whitey Herzog after Game Three of the 1982 World Series

In Game 3 of the 1982 World Series, McGee hit two home runs and made a leaping catch of a would-be ninth-inning Gorman Thomas home run that secured the Cardinals 6–2 victory. McGee became the third rookie to hit two home runs in a World Series game, joining two New York Yankees: Charlie Keller and one of the announcers for the 1982 Series, Tony Kubek. (Andruw Jones joined them in Game 1 of the 1996 World Series, and Michael Conforto joined them in Game 4 of the 2015 World Series.) McGee was an integral part of the Cardinals' unlikely Series win over the power-hitting Milwaukee Brewers, who were nicknamed "Harvey's Wallbangers" after team manager Harvey Kuenn.

During the 1980s, McGee, along with Cardinals teammates Ozzie Smith, Tom Herr, and Vince Coleman, exemplified "Whiteyball", a style of baseball named after Cardinals manager Whitey Herzog. This style of baseball took advantage of St. Louis' spacious Busch Stadium and placed strong emphasis on fundamentals, pitching, defense, speedy baserunning, and smart situational in-game play.

McGee hit for the cycle on June 23, 1984, in a classic Cardinals vs. Cubs matchup at Wrigley Field. The game was televised as NBC's Game of the Week. As the Cards led going into the bottom of the 9th, McGee was announced as NBC's "Player of the Game." After Chicago's Ryne Sandberg hit two home runs—in the ninth and tenth innings, propelling the Cubs to a 12–11 victory—NBC reported that McGee and Sandberg would share the honor.

In 1985, McGee ranked first in the National League in batting average (.353, which is the second highest mark by a switch hitter in NL history), hits (216), and triples (18). He also ranked third in the National League in runs scored (114) and stolen bases (56). Additionally, he earned a Gold Glove Award and a Silver Slugger Award and was voted to the National League All-Star team. For his superb offensive and defensive performance, McGee was named the 1985 NL Most Valuable Player. His .353 batting average was the highest for a National League player since Bill Madlock hit .354 ten years earlier; between 1975 and 1993, McGee's average also was second only to Tony Gwynn's 1987 NL average (.370). McGee's efforts helped propel the Cardinals into the postseason, where St. Louis defeated the Los Angeles Dodgers in the NL Championship Series. However, St. Louis came up short in the 1985 World Series, as the Kansas City Royals defeated the Cardinals in seven games. The Series was known as the "I-70 Series," named after Interstate 70, the highway that connects St. Louis to Kansas City.

In 1987, Cardinals manager Herzog moved McGee to 5th in the batting order. McGee responded well to the move and drove in a career-high 105 runs. Again, McGee was a key component to the Cardinals' success as they enjoyed another fine season finishing as Eastern Division champs. After defeating the San Francisco Giants in a heated NL Championship Series, Herzog's Cardinals found themselves in their third World Series contest of the 1980s; the Minnesota Twins defeated the Cardinals in the 1987 World Series in seven games. McGee himself made the last out of the seventh game of the series, grounding out to third base.

=== 1990–1995 ===
1990 would mark the end of the "Whiteyball" era in St. Louis. Amidst poor overall team performance, Herzog surprisingly announced his retirement on July 6. In an effort to begin the team's re-building process, McGee was traded to the American League's Oakland Athletics on August 29 for 25-year-old outfielder Félix José and two minor-league players (third baseman Stan Royer and pitcher Daryl Green). McGee's brief stint with Oakland, managed by Tony La Russa, helped propel the team to the 1990 World Series. This would be McGee's fourth trip to the Fall Classic; the Athletics, however, were pounded in the Series as the Cincinnati Reds would sweep the defending world champions in four games. Despite being traded to the AL, McGee had already accumulated 542 plate appearances in the National League, enough for him to qualify for the NL batting crown. Los Angeles' Eddie Murray (.330 average), the New York Mets' Dave Magadan (.328) and others gave chase. However, because no batter was able to catch McGee's .335 NL batting mark, he won his second batting title. McGee's accomplishment marked an odd first in major league history, in which the batting champion for one league ended the season as a member of the other league. In 1990, George Brett of the Kansas City Royals led the American league with a .329 batting average. Because McGee's batting average over the entire season was only .324, neither league's batting champion led the Major Leagues in batting; that honor fell to Eddie Murray.

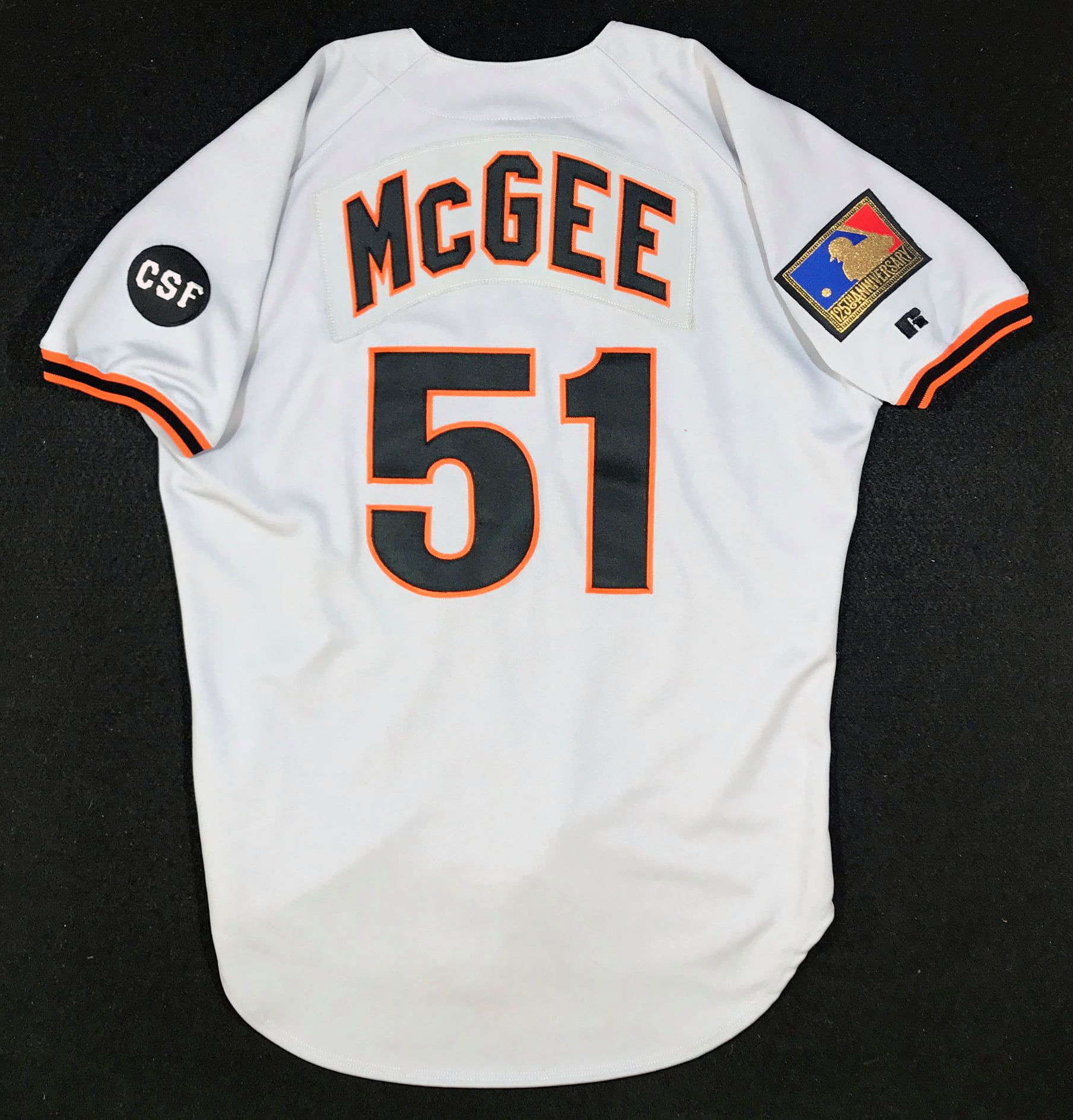
1994 San Francisco Giants #51 Willie McGee road jersey

On December 3, 1990, McGee signed a multi-year contract with the San Francisco Giants. This decision allowed him to continue his professional career in the area in which he was born, raised, and resided with his family. With the Giants, he remained a consistent and productive player, batting near or above .300 each year until an ankle injury befell him in 1994.

Attempting to rebound from injury, McGee signed as a free agent with the Boston Red Sox on June 6, 1995, and played in only 67 games that season. McGee had one hit in four at-bats in the Cleveland Indians' Division Series sweep of Boston.

=== Return to St. Louis ===
He looks like he doesn't have a friend in the world. Meanwhile, all the world is his friend.

— Jack Buck

On December 15, 1995, McGee signed with St. Louis as a free agent. One of the lighter moments of the 1996 season came in the form of a commercial that McGee recorded with Ozzie Smith. As part of the team's "Baseball like it oughta be" ad campaign, Smith and McGee—under the aliases of "Henry Smith" and "Walter McGee" respectively—partially ad-libbed several TV spots dressed as two old men sitting in a bar talking about the Cardinals. Shocked that the shy McGee would do such an outrageous thing, teammates were enthralled by watching outtakes from the TV spots, some of which can be seen on a commemorative video about the Cardinals' 1996 season.

An aged veteran at this point in his career, McGee's role as outfielder became limited, and he averaged about 300 at bats a year. Despite his limited role, he batted .307 and .300 in 1996 and 1997, respectively, and he provided fans with dramatic offensive sparks that recalled his earlier years. In St. Louis' 1997 home opener at Busch Memorial Stadium, with two outs in the bottom of the ninth inning and the score tied 1–1, McGee hit a pinch-hit home run to win the game, which provided a memorable highlight to cap his remarkable career with the St. Louis Cardinals. On August 5, 1999, Willie made a brilliant shoestring catch on a looping fly ball hit by San Diego Padres' outfielder Tony Gwynn. Had McGee not caught that ball, Gwynn would have recorded his 3,000th major league hit.

McGee appeared in his final game on October 3, 1999, at age 40 and as the third-oldest player in the majors.

== Career statistics ==
Regular Season Batting

G	AB	AVG	R	H	2B	3B	HR	RBI	BB	SB	SO	SLG	OBP
2201	7649	.295	1010	2254	350	94	79	856	448	352	1238	.396	.333

Post Season Batting

G	AB	AVG	R	H	2B	3B	HR	RBI	BB	SB	SO	SLG	OBP
54	192	.276	27	53	8	3	4	23	7	8	43	.411	.302

McGee had a .976 career fielding % and from 1983 to 1990 finished in the top 5 among NL outfielders in the category of Range Factor/Game as OF. In 1986, McGee led the NL in Fielding % as OF (.991), Range Factor/Game as OF (2.76), and Putouts as CF (325).

== Post-playing career ==
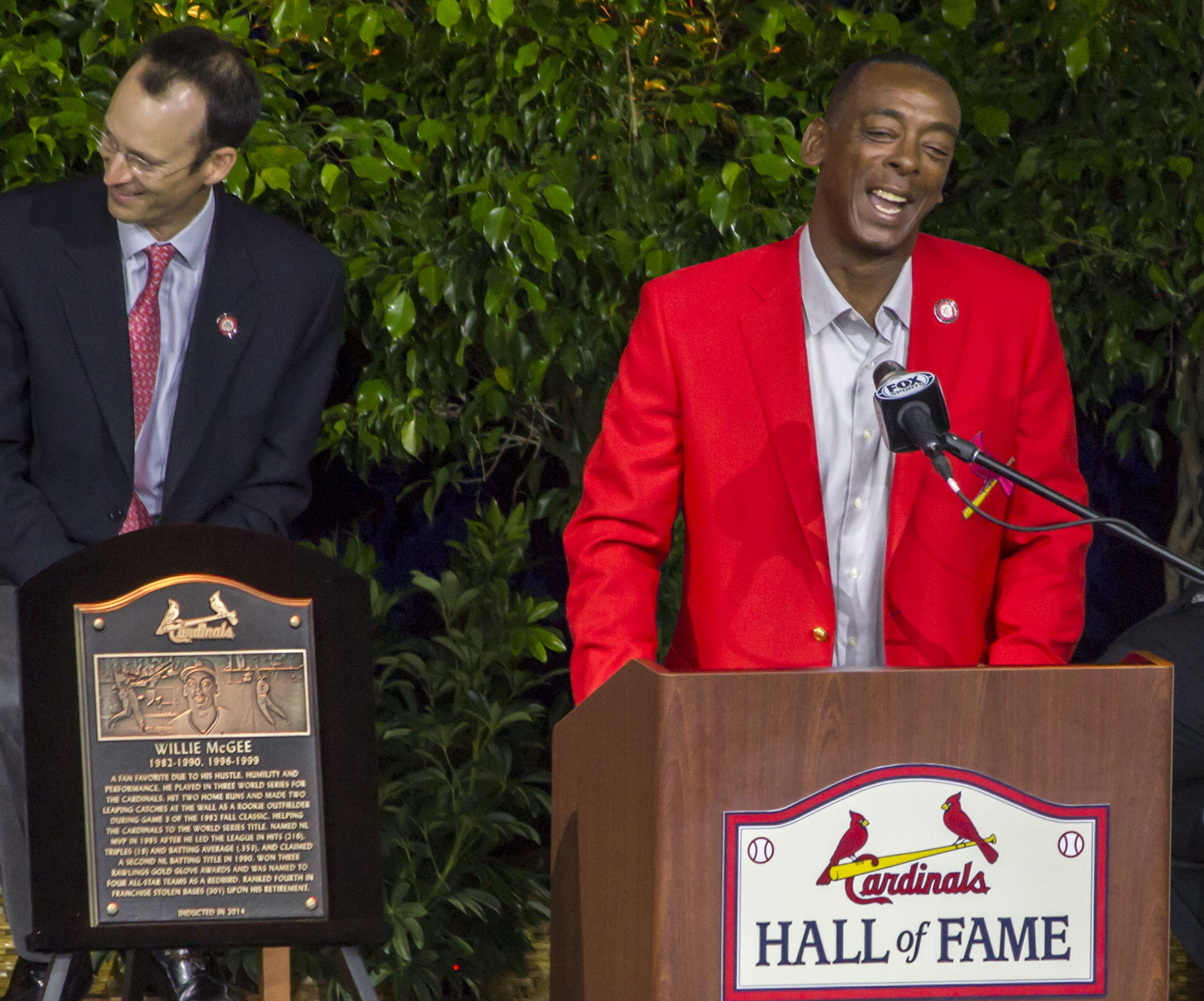
McGee delivering a speech during his induction into the Cardinals Hall of Fame

The season after his retirement as player, McGee was honored with a special ceremony at Busch Memorial Stadium. There has been some support among fans for a formal retirement of McGee's number 51 uniform number by the Cardinals.

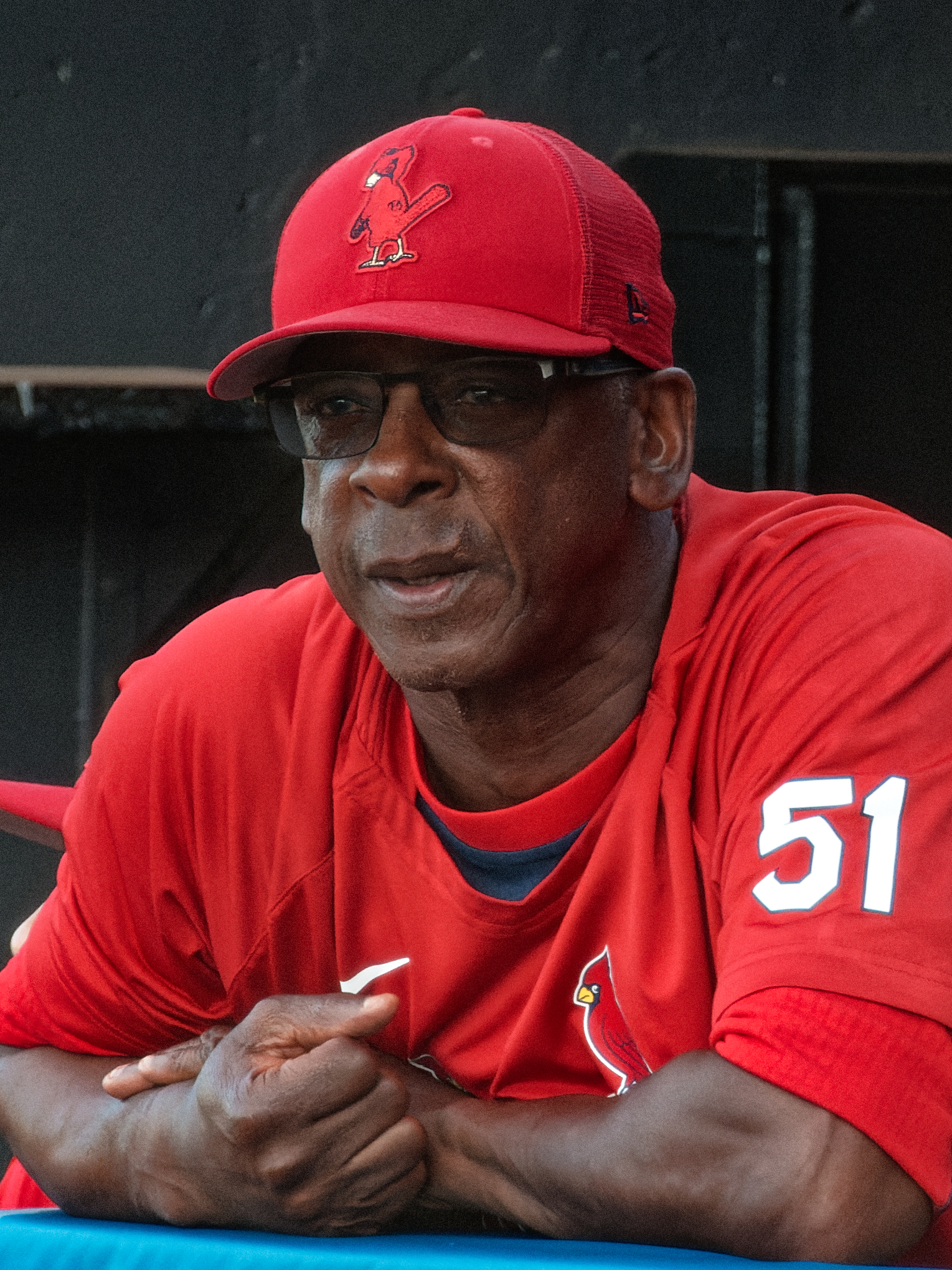
McGee with the Cardinals in 2023

On March 6, 2013, the St. Louis Cardinals announced they had hired McGee as a special assistant to General Manager John Mozeliak. McGee's role as special assistant included working with outfielders in the Cardinals' minor league system as well as monitoring the organization's minor league players.

McGee was inducted into the St. Louis Cardinals Hall of Fame on August 16, 2014.

On October 23, 2017, the Cardinals added McGee to their major league coaching staff. As of December 2017, McGee was listed on the Cardinals' roster as an assistant coach, with 51 as his uniform number.

On August 14, 2020, McGee announced he would be sitting out the remainder of the 2020 season due to the COVID-19 pandemic. By 2021, he had resumed his role as an assistant coach. On October 21, 2024, McGee stepped down from the major league staff and moved to an advisory role with the front office.

== See also ==
- List of Major League Baseball career hits leaders
- List of Major League Baseball career runs scored leaders
- List of Major League Baseball batting champions
- List of Major League Baseball annual triples leaders
- List of Major League Baseball players to hit for the cycle

Awards and achievements
Preceded by Carlton Fisk	Hitting for the cycle June 23, 1984	Succeeded by Dwight Evans
Preceded by Keith Hernandez	National League Player of the Month; August 1985	Succeeded by Gary Carter
