= Willie Smith (1990s pitcher) =

American baseball player (born 1967)

- Pitcher
- Born: August 27, 1967 (age 59); Savannah, Georgia, U.S.
- Batted: Right Threw: Right

Professional debut
- MLB: April 25, 1994, for the St. Louis Cardinals
- CPBL: September 19, 1998, for the Uni-President Lions

Last appearance
- MLB: May 10, 1994, for the St. Louis Cardinals
- CPBL: September 19, 1998, for the Uni-President Lions

MLB statistics
- Win–loss record: 1–1
- Earned run average: 9.00
- Strikeouts: 7

CPBL statistics
- Win–loss record: 0–0
- Earned run average: 0.00
- Strikeouts: 0
- Stats at Baseball Reference

Teams
- St. Louis Cardinals (1994); Uni-President Lions (1998)

Willie Everett Smith (born August 27, 1967) is an American former professional baseball pitcher. He appeared in eight games for the St. Louis Cardinals in 1994, playing his final game on May 10, 1994.

Smith missed the entire 1993 minor-league season after having elbow surgery but was not released by the Texas Rangers until January 1994. He was signed by the Cardinals that month after a tryout in his native Savannah, Georgia. After pitching only an inning with the Cardinals in spring training in 1994 due to an illness and personal reasons, he started the season in Triple-A. He was called up to St. Louis in April, however, following an injury to Mike Pérez.
