= Craig Wilson (baseball, born 1964) =

American baseball player (born 1964)

- Utility player
- Born: November 28, 1964 (age 61); Annapolis, Maryland, U.S.
- Batted: Right Threw: Right

MLB debut
- September 6, 1989, for the St. Louis Cardinals

Last MLB appearance
- September 29, 1993, for the Kansas City Royals

MLB statistics
- Batting average: .251
- Home runs: 1
- Runs batted in: 37
- Stats at Baseball Reference

Teams
- St. Louis Cardinals (1989–1992); Kansas City Royals (1993)

Craig Wilson (born November 28, 1964) is an American former professional baseball player. He played all or parts of five seasons in Major League Baseball from 1989 through 1993, primarily as a third baseman but also playing at second base and in the outfield.

Wilson was born in Annapolis, Maryland to his mother, Bernice, and father, Calvin. He played high school football and baseball at Annapolis High School. He turned down a scholarship offer to play college football at Howard University in order to play college baseball at Anne Arundel Community College.

He was selected in the 20th round of the 1984 Major League Baseball draft by the St. Louis Cardinals. He played in the Cardinals' organization through 1992, including 1989 through 1992 at the Major League level. During the 1992-93 offseason, Wilson was traded along with Félix José to the Kansas City Royals in exchange for Gregg Jeffries and a minor league player. Wilson played one season for the Royals, then became a free agent. He played two more seasons in the minor leagues before retiring after the 1995 season.

Shortly after his retirement, he served as an assistant baseball coach at Annapolis High School and a head coach at The Key School.

He made a brief comeback in the Mexican League for the Guerreros de Oaxaca in 2003, but retired again after 14 games.
