= Mark Grater =

American baseball player (born 1964)

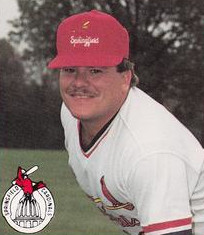
- Grater in 1988
- Pitcher / Coach
- Born: January 19, 1964 (age 61); Rochester, Pennsylvania, U.S.
- Batted: Right Threw: Right

MLB debut
- June 12, 1991, for the St. Louis Cardinals

Last MLB appearance
- May 21, 1993, for the Detroit Tigers

MLB statistics
- Win–loss record: 0–0
- Earned run average: 3.38
- Strikeouts: 4
- Stats at Baseball Reference

Teams
- St. Louis Cardinals (1991); Detroit Tigers (1993)

Mark Anthony Grater (born January 19, 1964) is an American former professional baseball pitcher. Grater played in nine games over parts of two seasons in Major League Baseball (MLB) for the St. Louis Cardinals and the Detroit Tigers. He batted and threw right-handed.

== Career ==
=== Amateur career ===
Grater attended Monaca High School in Monaca, Pennsylvania and began his college baseball career at the Community College of Beaver County.

=== Coaching career ===
As of 2011, Grater was in his eighteenth year as a pitching coach and was working for the Washington Nationals as their pitching rehabilitation coordinator. Prior to the 2021 season, he was named the Nationals' rehabilitation and Dominican Republic pitching coordinator.

On January 9, 2025, Grater was hired to serve as a coach for the CTBC Brothers of the Chinese Professional Baseball League.
