= Gary Buckels =

American baseball player (born 1965)

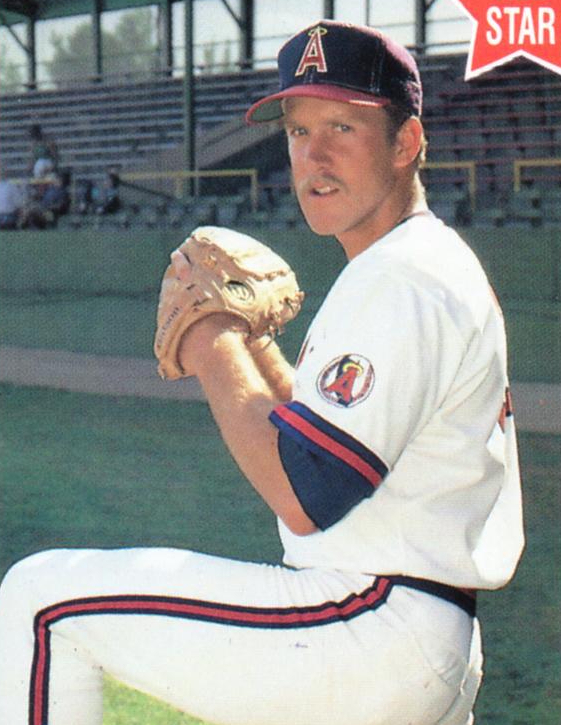
- Buckels with the Quad City Angels c. 1988
- Pitcher
- Born: July 22, 1965 (age 60); La Mirada, California, U.S.
- Batted: Right Threw: Right

MLB debut
- July 23, 1994, for the St. Louis Cardinals

Last MLB appearance
- August 10, 1994, for the St. Louis Cardinals

MLB statistics
- Win–loss record: 0–1
- Earned run average: 2.25
- Strikeouts: 9
- Stats at Baseball Reference

Teams
- St. Louis Cardinals (1994)

Gary Scott Buckels (born July 22, 1965) is an American former professional baseball pitcher. He played during one season in Major League Baseball (MLB) for the St. Louis Cardinals.

== Career ==
He was signed by the California Angels as an amateur free agent in 1987. Buckles played his first professional season with their Class A (Short Season) Salem Angels in 1987, and his last season with the Detroit Tigers' Triple-A club, the Toledo Mud Hens, in 1995. Now he is a catching and pitching coach in Huntington Beach, California.
