= Arizona Complex League Athletics =

- Founded in 1988; Mesa, Arizona; previously in Scottsdale, Arizona (1988–1995)

Team logo	Cap insignia

Minor league affiliations
- Class: Rookie
- League: Arizona Complex League
- Division: East
- Previous leagues: Arizona League (1988–2020)

Major league affiliations
- Team: Athletics

Minor league titles
- League titles (7): 1988; 1991; 1992; 1993; 1995; 1999; 2001
- Division titles (1): 2012
- Second-half titles (2): 2001; 2004

Team data
- Name: ACL Athletics
- Previous names: AZL Athletics Green & Gold (2019); AZL Athletics (1988–2018)
- Colors: hunter green, gold, white
- Ballpark: Fitch Park (2015–present)
- Previous parks: Papago Park Baseball Complex (1996–2014); Scottsdale Stadium (1988–1995)
- Owner/ Operator: Athletics
- Manager: Adam Rosales

The Arizona Complex League Athletics are a Minor League Baseball team based in Mesa, Arizona, which plays as a Rookie-level team in the Arizona Complex League and has served as a farm team for the Athletics organization since 1988. They play their home games at Fitch Park, the minor league spring training camp of the Athletics. The team is composed mainly of players who are in their first year of professional baseball either as draftees or non-drafted free agents from the United States, Canada, Dominican Republic, Venezuela, and other countries.

== History ==
The team first competed in the Arizona League (AZL) in 1988, and has been a member of the league continuously since then. During the 2019 season, the team fielded two squads in the league, differentiated by Green and Gold suffixes. Prior to the 2021 season, the Arizona League was renamed as the Arizona Complex League (ACL).

== Rosters ==
Arizona Complex League Athletics roster
Players	Coaches/Other
Pitchers: -- Jamie Arnold; -- Alex Barr; -- Corey Braun; -- Kade Brown; 78 Paul Chacon; 88 Dairon De Jesus; -- Blake Hammond; -- Jackson Holmes; 90 Francis Marte; 82 Josnier Parra; 73 Manuel Perez; -- Jackson Phipps; 25 Robert Puason; -- Grant Richardson; 36 Josiah Romeo; -- Itsuki Takemoto; 48 Roberto Urdaneta; Catchers: -- Owen Carapellotti; 37 Ramon Landaeta; -- Diego Rosa; -- Logan Sauve; Infielders: -- Daniel Bucciero; 20 Bjay Cooke; -- Jared Davis; 81 Kevin Dume; 76 Jesus Fernandez; 23 Shotaro Morii; -- Judah Morris; -- Myles Naylor; Outfielders: 13 Reynaldo De La Paz; 68 Darling Fernandez; -- Luis Freitez	Manager: -- Gunner Buhner; Coaches: 7 Mike Benjamin (hitting); 28 Craig Conklin (coach); -- Ruben Escalera (hitting); -- John Foster (pitching); 47 Rick Rodriguez (pitching); -- Adam Rosales (coach); 60-day injured list: -- Bryson McArn; 7-day injured list; * On Athletics 40-man roster; ~ Development list; # Rehab assignment; ∞ Reserve list; ‡ Restricted list; § Suspended list; † Temporarily inactive list; Roster updated March 27, 2026; Transactions; → More rosters: MiLB • Arizona Complex League; → Athletics minor league players
