= Ray Stephens (baseball) =

American baseball player (born 1962)

- Catcher
- Born: September 22, 1962 (age 63); Houston, Texas, U.S.
- Batted: Right Threw: Right

MLB debut
- September 20, 1990, for the St. Louis Cardinals

Last MLB appearance
- October 3, 1992, for the Texas Rangers

MLB statistics
- Batting average: .171
- Home runs: 1
- RBI: 1
- Stats at Baseball Reference

Teams
- St. Louis Cardinals (1990–1991); Texas Rangers (1992)

Carl Ray Stephens Jr. (born September 22, 1962) is an American former professional baseball catcher. He played in Major League Baseball (MLB) for the St. Louis Cardinals and Texas Rangers between 1990 and 1992.

Born in Houston, Texas, Stephens attended Bradley Central High School in Cleveland, Tennessee. He attended Troy State University and Middle Georgia College. He threw and batted right-handed, was 6 ft 0 in (1.83 m) and weighed 190 pounds.

Stephens was drafted by the Cardinals in the 6th round of the 1985 amateur draft. He had a career minor league average of .238. In 1988 with the Triple-A Louisville Redbirds, he batted only .189 in 115 games.

Stephens made his Major League debut at the age of 27 against the Philadelphia Phillies on September 20, 1990, going 1 for 3 with his first MLB hit being a home run off of Terry Mulholland. He went 2 for 15 (.133) in five games during his rookie year, his second of two hits that season being a double. He made six more appearances for the Cardinals in 1991, going 2 for 7 (.286) at the plate.

Stephens played in eight more games for the Texas Rangers during the 1992 season, going 2 for 13 (.154), and spent the 1993 season with the Triple-A Oklahoma City 89ers. His career Major League batting average ended up being .171, and he made zero errors on the field for a 1.000 fielding percentage.

== Other information ==
- He earned $100,000 in 1990 and $179,000 in 1992.
- In 1990 and 1991, he wore the number 54. In 1992, he wore 24.
- He currently resides in Charleston, Tennessee.

He currently volunteers as a coach for his alma mater, Bradley Central High School
