= Tim Sherrill =

American baseball player (born 1965)

- Relief pitcher
- Born: September 10, 1965 (age 60); Harrison, Arkansas, U.S.
- Batted: Left Threw: Left

MLB debut
- August 14, 1990, for the St. Louis Cardinals

Last MLB appearance
- June 16, 1991, for the St. Louis Cardinals

MLB statistics
- Games pitched: 18
- Win–loss record: 0–0
- Earned run average: 7.71
- Stats at Baseball Reference

Teams
- St. Louis Cardinals (1990–1991)

Timothy Shawn Sherrill (born September 10, 1965) is an American former Major League Baseball (MLB) left-handed relief pitcher who played in 18 games for the St. Louis Cardinals during the 1990 and 1991 seasons.
