= Stan Royer =

American baseball player (born 1967)

- Third baseman/First baseman
- Born: August 31, 1967 (age 58); Olney, Illinois, U.S.
- Batted: Right Threw: Right

MLB debut
- September 11, 1991, for the St. Louis Cardinals

Last MLB appearance
- July 22, 1994, for the Boston Red Sox

MLB statistics
- Batting average: .250
- Home runs: 4
- Runs batted in: 21
- Stats at Baseball Reference

Teams
- St. Louis Cardinals (1991–1994); Boston Red Sox (1994)

Stanley Dean Royer (born August 31, 1967) is an American former third baseman/first baseman in Major League Baseball who played from 1991 through 1994 for the St. Louis Cardinals (1991–1994) and Boston Red Sox (1994). Listed at 6' 3", 195 lb., he batted and threw right-handed.

Drafted out of Charleston High School in Charleston, Illinois by the Atlanta Braves, Royer decided to not sign and attended college instead. Royer was selected by the Oakland Athletics in the 1988 draft out of Eastern Illinois University, from where he had earned an economics degree. Before the 1991 season, he was sent by Oakland along with Félix José and a minor leaguer to the Cardinals in the same transaction that brought Willie McGee to the Athletics.

In a four-season career, Royer was a .250 hitter (41-for-164) with 21 RBI in 89 games, including four home runs, 10 doubles, and 14 runs scored. He also played in the Oakland, St. Louis and Boston minor league systems from 1988 to 1994, hitting .270 with 72 home runs and 417 RBI in 707 games.

Royer is President of Claris Advisors, an investment advising and wealth management firm based in St. Louis.
