= Tom Brunansky =

American baseball player (born 1960)

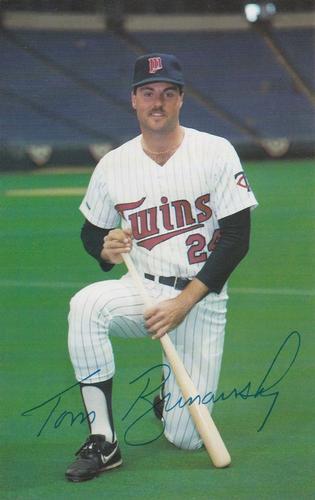
- Brunansky in 1987
- Right fielder
- Born: August 20, 1960 (age 65); Covina, California, U.S.
- Batted: Right Threw: Right

MLB debut
- April 9, 1981, for the California Angels

Last MLB appearance
- August 10, 1994, for the Boston Red Sox

MLB statistics
- Batting average: .245
- Home runs: 271
- Runs batted in: 919
- Stats at Baseball Reference

Teams
- California Angels (1981); Minnesota Twins (1982–1988); St. Louis Cardinals (1988–1990); Boston Red Sox (1990–1992); Milwaukee Brewers (1993–1994); Boston Red Sox (1994)

Career highlights and awards
- All-Star (1985); World Series champion (1987)

Thomas Andrew Brunansky (born August 20, 1960), nicknamed "Bruno", is an American former right fielder in Major League Baseball who played from 1981 to 1994 for the California Angels, Minnesota Twins, St. Louis Cardinals, Boston Red Sox, and Milwaukee Brewers.

In a 14-season career, he batted .245 with 271 home runs and 919 RBIs in 1800 games. Brunansky averaged 24 home runs per 162 games. He finished his career with 1543 hits in 6289 at bats, 69 stolen bases, and 306 doubles.

== Professional career ==
After being drafted in the first round (14th pick) of the 1978 amateur draft by the California Angels' organization after his senior year at West Covina High School in California, Brunansky spent the next four years working his way up the Angels' minor league system before appearing in 11 games in 1981 after making his major league debut on April 19. On May 11, 1982, he was traded by the Angels, along with pitcher Mike Walters, to the Minnesota Twins for pitcher Doug Corbett and infielder Rob Wilfong. The 21-year-old Brunansky was then inserted into the Twins' lineup, where he saw time at all three outfield positions and slugged his way to the first of his eight consecutive seasons in which he hit at least 20 home runs.

Following the 1982 season, Brunansky became a fixture in right field for the Twins, starting there through the 1987 season. In 1982, Brunansky became the only Twin in franchise history to hit a grand slam, inside-the-park home run. He accomplished this in a July 19 home game at the Hubert H. Humphrey Metrodome in the third inning off the Brewers' Jerry Augustine. Ironically, all four runs were considered unearned because of two Brewers' fielding errors earlier in the inning. Only 40 major league players have hit a grand slam, inside-the-park home run since 1950.

Brunansky was the Twins' sole All-Star representative in 1985 and was a starter for the World Champion 1987 Minnesota Twins during what was arguably his best overall season (hitting .259, with 32 HR, 85 RBI and 83 Runs). Brunansky helped the Twins upset the Detroit Tigers in the American League Championship Series by hitting .412 with 2 home runs and 9 RBI in the five-game series. He then had a somewhat invisible World Series, only hitting .200 with one RBI. Just months after playing each other in the World Series, the Twins shocked both their fans and Brunansky by trading him on April 22, 1988, to the St. Louis Cardinals for second baseman Tom Herr. Although the move was meant to strengthen the top of the order, Herr spent one lackluster season with the Twins, during which he complained about being in Minnesota, while Brunansky continued his home run hitting ways for six more seasons.

On May 4, 1990, he was traded by the Cardinals to the Red Sox for closer Lee Smith. Brunansky played three seasons for the Red Sox, and is best remembered by Boston fans for his diving catch of an Ozzie Guillén line drive in the ninth inning of the season ending game that preserved the Red Sox victory, sending them to the 1990 ALCS. However, Brunansky hit .083, and the team as a whole hit a pitiful .183, as the Oakland A's swept the Sox in four games (before being swept themselves by the Cincinnati Reds in the 1990 World Series).

At the end of the 1992 season, he became a free agent and signed with the Milwaukee Brewers on January 28, 1993. Brunansky struggled with the Brewers, batting just .183 with six home runs over 80 games that season. He played only 16 games the following season before being traded back to the Red Sox on June 16, 1994, for Dave Valle. He put up decent power numbers in Boston, hitting 10 doubles and 10 home runs in 48 games, but the strike-shortened 1994 season would be his last in the majors.

== Retirement ==
Following retirement, Brunansky was hired in 2004 as the coach for the Poway High School baseball team in Poway, California. In July 2010 after finishing his sixth season at Poway, Brunansky accepted a job as the hitting coach for the Twins' Rookie League team, the Gulf Coast League Twins. At the end of the season, he was promoted to be the hitting coach for the Twins' AA League team, the New Britain Rock Cats. On November 1, 2011, Brunansky was again promoted to become the hitting coach for the Rochester Red Wings where he would help the team to their best season since 2008, finishing 72-72. On October 22, 2012, Brunansky was promoted to be the Twins' hitting coach. He was fired after the 2016 season.

On May 9, 2012, the Boston Red Sox honored Brunansky for his diving catch that helped the Red Sox clinch the AL East in 1990.

Since 2017, Brunansky has been the hitting coach at the University of Saint Katherine in California.

== See also ==
- List of Major League Baseball career home run leaders
