= Mike Pérez (baseball) =

Puerto Rican baseball player (born 1964)

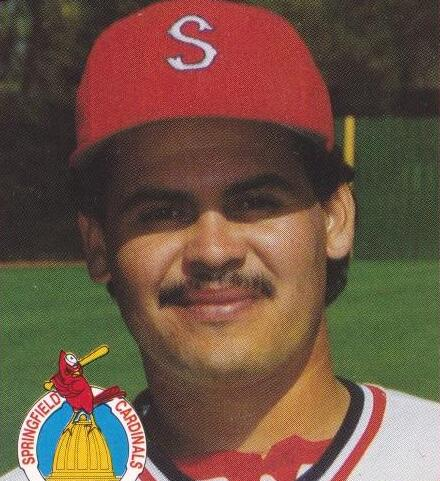
- Pérez with the Springfield Cardinals c. 1987
- Pitcher
- Born: October 19, 1964 (age 61); Yauco, Puerto Rico
- Batted: Right Threw: Right

MLB debut
- September 5, 1990, for the St. Louis Cardinals

Last MLB appearance
- August 17, 1997, for the Kansas City Royals

MLB statistics
- Win–loss record: 24–16
- Earned run average: 3.56
- Strikeouts: 224
- Stats at Baseball Reference

Teams
- St. Louis Cardinals (1990–1994); Chicago Cubs (1995–1996); Kansas City Royals (1997)

Michael Irvin Pérez Ortega (born October 19, 1964) is a Puerto Rican who played professional baseball as a pitcher in the Major Leagues for eight seasons in the 1990s. Perez played college baseball for the University of Florida and Troy State University, and thereafter, he played professionally for the St. Louis Cardinals, Chicago Cubs and Kansas City Royals.

== Career ==
Perez was born in Yauco, Puerto Rico.

Perez received an athletic scholarship to attend the University of Florida, where he played for coach Joe Arnold's Florida Gators baseball team in 1985. He also attended Troy University in Troy, Alabama, and played for the Troy Trojans baseball team. Perez was selected by the St. Louis Cardinals in the twelfth round of the 1986 MLB draft.

Perez made his late-season major league debut for the St. Louis Cardinals on September 5, 1990, and played for the Cardinals for five seasons from 1990 to 1994. He also played for the Chicago Cubs from 1995 to 1996, and the Kansas City Royals in 1997. Perez appeared in 313 games as a relief pitcher, finished 100 of them, and posted twenty-two saves. He retired after the 1997 season, and finished his major league career with a win–loss record of 24–16, 224 strikeouts, and an earned run average (ERA) of 3.56.
