= Arizona League Cardinals =

- 1989–1994; Chandler, Arizona

Minor league affiliations
- Previous classes: Rookie
- League: Arizona Rookie League

Major league affiliations
- Previous teams: St. Louis Cardinals

Minor league titles
- League titles: 1994

The Arizona League Cardinals were the rookie level farm club of the St. Louis Cardinals in the Arizona League from 1989 to 1994. They were based in Peoria, Arizona from 1990 to 1992 and in Chandler, Arizona from 1993 to 1994.
