= Félix José =

Dominican baseball player (born 1965)

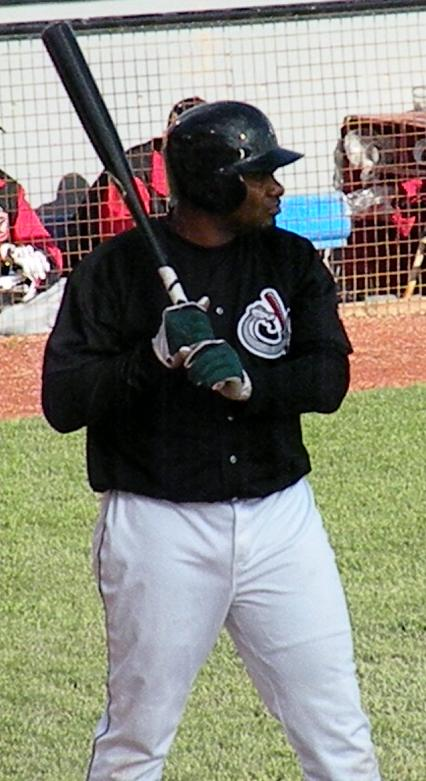
- Right fielder
- Born: May 2, 1965 (age 60); Santo Domingo, Dominican Republic
- Batted: Switch Threw: Right

MLB debut
- September 2, 1988, for the Oakland Athletics

Last MLB appearance
- September 28, 2003, for the Arizona Diamondbacks

MLB statistics
- Batting average: .280
- Home runs: 54
- Runs batted in: 324

KBO statistics
- Batting average: .309
- Home runs: 95
- Runs batted in: 314
- Stats at Baseball Reference

Teams
- Oakland Athletics (1988–1990); St. Louis Cardinals (1990–1992); Kansas City Royals (1993–1995); Lotte Giants (1999); New York Yankees (2000); Lotte Giants (2001); Arizona Diamondbacks (2002–2003); Lotte Giants (2006–2007)

Career highlights and awards
- All-Star (1991)

Domingo Félix Andújar José (born May 2, 1965) is a Dominican former professional baseball outfielder. He played in Major League Baseball (MLB) for the Oakland Athletics, St. Louis Cardinals, Kansas City Royals, New York Yankees and Arizona Diamondbacks between 1988 and 2003. He also played in the KBO League for the Lotte Giants in 1999, 2001, and 2006–2007. In an 11–season Major League career, José posted a .280 batting average with 54 home runs and 324 RBI in 747 games played. In four seasons in the KBO League, José posted a .309 batting average with 95 homers and 314 RBI in 394 games.

== Playing career ==
During his time in Oakland, the Athletics appeared in three straight World Series; while he was not on the postseason roster in any of those years, José was awarded a World Series ring for the team's 1989 series win.

José was selected to the National League All-Star team in 1991 with the Cardinals. He was the National League Player of the Month in April 1991 and May 1992.

José played in the Dominican Professional Baseball League with Tigres del Licey until the 1997–98 season, having debuted in the 1986–87 season and hitting 14 home runs before being transferred to Estrellas Orientales, and with this club he set a league record on November 19, 2005, when he hit his 60th home run.

José last played in 2009 for the Schaumburg Flyers of the Northern League, and was leading the league in batting average in June.

== Post-playing career ==
José was inducted into the Dominican Republic Hall of Fame in 2015.

In January 2017 José was selected as the "Star" coach of America's Next Top Baseball Players, a reality television series focusing on finding undiscovered raw talent in the Dominican Republic.

Preceded by Kal Daniels; Barry Bonds	National League Player of the Month; April 1991; May 1992	Succeeded by David Justice; Cory Snyder
