= Arizona Complex League Mariners =

Minor League Baseball team (founded in 1988)

- Founded in 1988; Peoria, Arizona

Minor league affiliations
- Class: Rookie
- League: Arizona Complex League
- Division: West
- Previous leagues: Arizona League (1988–2020)

Major league affiliations
- Team: Seattle Mariners (1988–present)
- Previous teams: Boston Red Sox (1988)

Minor league titles
- League titles (4): 2000; 2007; 2009; 2016
- Division titles (4): 2009; 2014; 2016; 2021

Team data
- Name: ACL Mariners
- Previous names: AZL Mariners (1989–2020); AZL Red Sox/Mariners (1988)
- Ballpark: Peoria Sports Complex
- Owner/ Operator: Seattle Mariners
- Manager: Hecmart Nieves

The Arizona Complex League Mariners are a Rookie-level affiliate of the Seattle Mariners, competing in the Arizona Complex League of Minor League Baseball. The team plays its home games at Peoria Sports Complex in Peoria, Arizona. The team is composed mainly of players who are in their first year of professional baseball either as draftees or non-drafted free agents.

== History ==
The team first competed in the Arizona League (AZL) in 1988, as a cooperative between the Seattle Mariners and the Boston Red Sox known as the Arizona League Red Sox/Mariners. In 1989, the team became an affiliate solely of the Mariners, and was renamed as such. The team has operated continuously in Arizona since then. Ahead of the 2021 season, the Arizona League was renamed as the Arizona Complex League (ACL).

== Season-by-season record ==
Season	Finish	Wins	Losses	Win%	Manager	Postseason
1989	3rd	26	26	.500	Dave Myers	
1990	2nd	32	21	.604	Dave Myers	
1991	3rd	33	27	.550	Myron Pines	
1992	2nd	32	24	.571	Carlos Lezcano	
1993	8th	18	36	.333	Marty Martínez	
1994	8th	21	35	.375	Marty Martínez	
1995	5th	24	32	.429	Tom LeVasseur	
1996	3rd	29	27	.509	Tom LeVasseur	
1997	2nd	30	26	.536	Darrin Garner	
1998	2nd	31	24	.564	Darrin Garner	
1999	2nd	32	24	.571	Gary Thurman	
2000	1st	39	16	.709	Omer Munoz	Champions
2001	2nd	34	22	.607	Omer Munoz	Playoff
2002	7th	19	36	.345	Darrin Garner	
2003	3rd	29	19	.604	Scott Steinmann	
2004	4th	31	25	.554	Scott Steinmann	
2005	5th	27	29	.482	Dana Williams	
2006	5th	25	30	.455	Dana Williams	
2007	1st	37	19	.661	Jose Moreno	Defeated Giants in championship
2008	8th	21	35	.375	Andy Bottin	
2009	1st	33	22	.600	Andy Bottin	Defeated Giants in championship
2010	4th	20	36	.357	Jesus Azuaje	
2011	2nd	25	31	.446	Jesus Azuaje	
2012	2nd	31	25	.554	Mike Kinkade	
2013	3rd	22	32	.407	Darrin Garner	
2014	1st	31	22	.585	Darrin Garner	Defeated Dodgers in quarter-final Lost to Giants in semi-final
2015	2nd	31	25	.554	Darrin Garner	Defeated Angels in quarter-final Defeated Cubs in semi-final Lost to White Sox in Championship series
2016	1st	31	25	.554	Zac Livingston	Defeated Cubs in quarter-final Defeated Reds in semi-final Defeated Angels in Championship series
2017	1st	31	24	.564	Zac Livingston	Lost Rangers in quarter-final
2018	6th	16	38	.296	Zac Livingston	
2019	7th	22	34	.396	Zac Livingston	
2020	Season canceled due to the COVID-19 pandemic					
2021	1st	40	8	.690	Austin Knight	
2022	4th	26	29	.473	Luis Caballero	
2023	2nd	31	25	.554	Luis Caballero	
2024	2nd	28	32	.467	Luis Caballero	
2025	4th	31	29	.517	Rico Reyes	
2026					Hecmart Nieves	

== Statistics ==
Mariners team statistics, and top hitter and pitcher statistics, by season

Team				Individual						
Year	BA	ERA	Fld	Hitter	AB	Hits	Avr	Pitcher	W–L	ERA
1992	.275	3.30	.934	Jim Furtado	134	42	.313	Greg Theron	4–1	1.26
1993	.246	4.78	.945	Jason Cook	160	51	.319	John Daniels	3–4	3.40
1994	.239	2.89	.954	Wilson Delgado	149	56	.376	Derek Bieniasz	3–3	1.39
1995	.260	4.30	.945	Duan Johnson	174	61	.351	Russell Jacob	6–2	2.89
1996	.246	3.68	.948	Brian Smith	223	66	.296	Shawn Chacón	1–2	1.60
1997	.278	4.61	.949	Jose Moreno	190	69	.363	Julio Mateo	3–1	3.30
1998	.255	3.57	.949	Alex Fernandez	151	50	.331	Enmanuel Ulloa	4–0	0.88
1999	.285	4.60	.957	Oscar Ramirez	159	52	.327	Roy Wells	3–0	2.68
2000	.316	4.10	.952	Pedro Liriano	170	68	.400	Derrick Van Dusen	6–0	2.63
2001	.300	4.59	.946	Christopher Collins	161	55	.342	Tanner Watson	8–2	4.42
2002	.252	4.94	.947	Joshua Ellison	149	49	.329	Luis Espinal	5–5	3.46
2003	.289	4.87	.953	Casey Craig	142	47	.331	Eric O'Flaherty	3–0	1.93
2004	.288	4.55	.952	Luis Soto	148	49	.331	Stephen Grasley	4–0	3.21
2005	.292	4.88	.951	Juan Guzman	153	49	.320	John Sullivan	3–0	2.88
2006	.274	4.19	NA	Alex Liddi	182	57	.313	Doug Salinas	4–0	2.82
2007	.267	3.39	.964	Daniel Carroll	201	65	.323	Fabian Williamson	6–2	3.41
2008	.260	5.09		Jharmidy De Jesus	127	43	.339	Richard Ortiz	4–2	2.92

== Roster ==
Arizona Complex League Mariners roster
Players	Coaches/Other
Pitchers: 54 Cristian Aray; 46 Gregori Arrieche; 91 Alan Carpinteiro; 96 Juan Cazarez; 38 Cole Cheatham; 28 Angel Chicuate; 99 Anderson Guevara; 90 Anthony Karoly; 83 Po-Chun Lin; 82 Kendal Meza; 82 Francisco Pazos; 81 Roberto Perez; 67 Ruben Ramirez; 28 Maximo Rodriguez; 36 Wuilliams Rodriguez; 96 Eduardo Uscanga; 33 Jack White #; 85 Dylan Wilson; Catchers: 30 Manuel Almeida; 31 Carlos Gonzalez; Infielders: 5 Nick Becker; 10 Deuri Castillo; 33 Diego Contreras; 15 Joshua Francis; 10 Martin Gonzalez; 9 Bryant Mendez; 3 Jo Oyama; 8 Leandro Romero; Outfielders: 7 Kelvin Alcantara; 21 Yorger Bautista; 20 Brayden Corn; 12 Konni Durschlag; 93 Spencer Packard	Manager: -- Hecmart Nieves; Coaches: -- George Bell (hitting); -- Tanner Gordon (pitching); -- Sergio Plasencia (coach); -- Chase Wullenweber (bench); 60-day injured list: -- Griffin Hugus (full season); -- Juan Jiminez; -- Ryan Loutos (full season); -- Ruddy Navarro; -- Juan Pinto; 15 Eduardo Ponce; 7-day injured list; * On Seattle Mariners 40-man roster; ~ Development list; # Rehab assignment; ∞ Reserve list; ‡ Restricted list; § Suspended list; † Temporarily inactive list; Roster updated May 25, 2026; Transactions; → More rosters: MiLB • Arizona Complex League; → Seattle Mariners minor league players
