= American Deutsch Bag =

EP by Teenage Bottlerocket
- Released: November 26, 2013
- Studio: The Blasting Room (Fort Collins)
- Genre: Punk rock
- Length: 3:54
- Label: Fat Wreck Chords

Teenage Bottlerocket chronology
Freak Out! (2012)	American Deutsch Bag (2013)	Tales from Wyoming (2015)

American Deutsch Bag is an EP by Teenage Bottlerocket. It was released on November 26, 2013 on Fat Wreck Chords. It was recorded at The Blasting Room with Andrew Berlin. The EP features one original song and two covers. One of the covers is a pop punk version of the German song "Ich bin Auslander und Spreche Nicht Gut Deutsch". The other, "Via Munich" is originally by Tony Sly and was recorded for The Songs of Tony Sly: A Tribute.

== Track listing ==
No.	Title	Writer(s)	Length
1.	"Ich bin Ausländer und spreche nicht gut Deutsch"		1:18
2.	"I’m the One Smoking Marijuana Motherfucker"		1:00
3.	"Via Munich"	Tony Sly	1:36
Total length:			3:54

== Personnel ==
- Kody Templeman – guitar, vocals
- Ray Carlisle – guitar, vocals
- Miguel Chen – bass
- Brandon Carlisle – drums
- Andrew Berlin – engineer, mixer
