= Chicago Cubs minor league players =

Below is a partial list of minor league baseball players in the Chicago Cubs system:

== Players ==
=== Owen Ayers ===
Owen Ayers

Chicago Cubs
- Catcher
- Born: June 7, 2001 (age 25); Sarasota, Florida, U.S.
- Bats: Switch Throws: Right

Owen Jeffrey Ayers (born June 7, 2001) is an American professional baseball catcher in the Chicago Cubs organization.

Ayers attended Sarasota High School in Sarasota, Florida and played college baseball at State College of Florida, Manatee–Sarasota and Marshall University. He was selected by the Chicago Cubs in the 19th round of the 2024 Major League Baseball draft.

Ayers made his professional debut with thee Myrtle Beach Pelicans and played 2025 with them. After the season, he played in the Arizona Fall League. Ayers started 2026 with the South Bend Cubs before being promoted to the Tennessee Smokies.

- Career statistics from Baseball Reference (Minors)

=== Brandon Birdsell ===
Brandon Birdsell

Chicago Cubs
- Pitcher
- Born: March 23, 2000 (age 26); Conroe, Texas, U.S.
- Bats: Right Throws: Right

Brandon Lee Birdsell (born March 23, 2000) is an American professional baseball pitcher in the Chicago Cubs organization.

Birdsell initially attended Conroe High School in Conroe, Texas. He underwent Tommy John surgery as a sophomore in 2016 and did not pitch as a junior while recovering. He transferred to Willis High School in Willis, Texas for his senior year in 2018. He was selected by the Houston Astros in the 39th round of the 2018 Major League Baseball draft but did not sign. Birdsell then played college baseball at Texas A&M University in 2019, San Jacinto College in 2020, and Texas Tech in 2021 and 2022. He appeared in seven games for Texas Tech in 2021 before he underwent rotator cuff surgery, ending his season. He was selected by the Minnesota Twins in the 11th round of the 2021 Major League Baseball draft but did not sign. In 2022, he started 15 games for Texas Tech and went 9–3 with a 2.75 ERA over 85 innings. After the season, he was selected by the Chicago Cubs in the fifth round of the 2022 Major League Baseball draft. He signed for $385,000.

Birdsell made his professional debut in 2023 with the High-A South Bend Cubs and was promoted to the Double-A Tennessee Smokies in August. Over 24 starts between the two teams, he went 4–8 with a 2.77 ERA and 97 strikeouts over 107 1/3 innings. He opened the 2024 season with Tennessee and was promoted to the Triple-A Iowa Cubs in July. Over 27 games (26 starts) between the two teams, Birdsell went 8–9 with a 3.91 ERA and 134 strikeouts and was named Cubs Minor League Pitcher of the Year.

Birdsell opened the 2025 season on the injured list with a lat strain. He went on to make eight starts split between the rookie-level Arizona Complex League Cubs, South Bend, and Iowa, accumulating a 2–2 record and 2.94 ERA with 33 strikeouts. On August 27, 2025, it was announced that Birdsell would require surgery on his right elbow. In April 2026, it was reported he would miss the entire 2026 season.

- Career statistics from Baseball Reference (Minors)
- Texas Tech Red Raiders bio

=== Brooks Caple ===
Brooks Caple

Chicago Cubs
- Pitcher
- Born: August 23, 2002 (age 24); Austin, Texas, U.S.
- Bats: Left Throws: Right

Brooks Mitchell Caple (born August 23, 2002) is an American professional baseball pitcher in the Chicago Cubs organization.

Caple attended Gunter High School in Gunter, Texas and played college baseball at Stephen F. Austin State University and Lamar University. He was selected by the Chicago Cubs in the ninth round of the 2024 Major League Baseball draft.

Sanders spent his first professional season in 2025 with the Myrtle Beach Pelicans and South Bend Cubs. He started 2026 with South Bend before being promoted to the Tennessee Smokies.

- Career statistics from Baseball Reference (Minors)

=== Josiah Hartshorn ===
Josiah Hartshorn
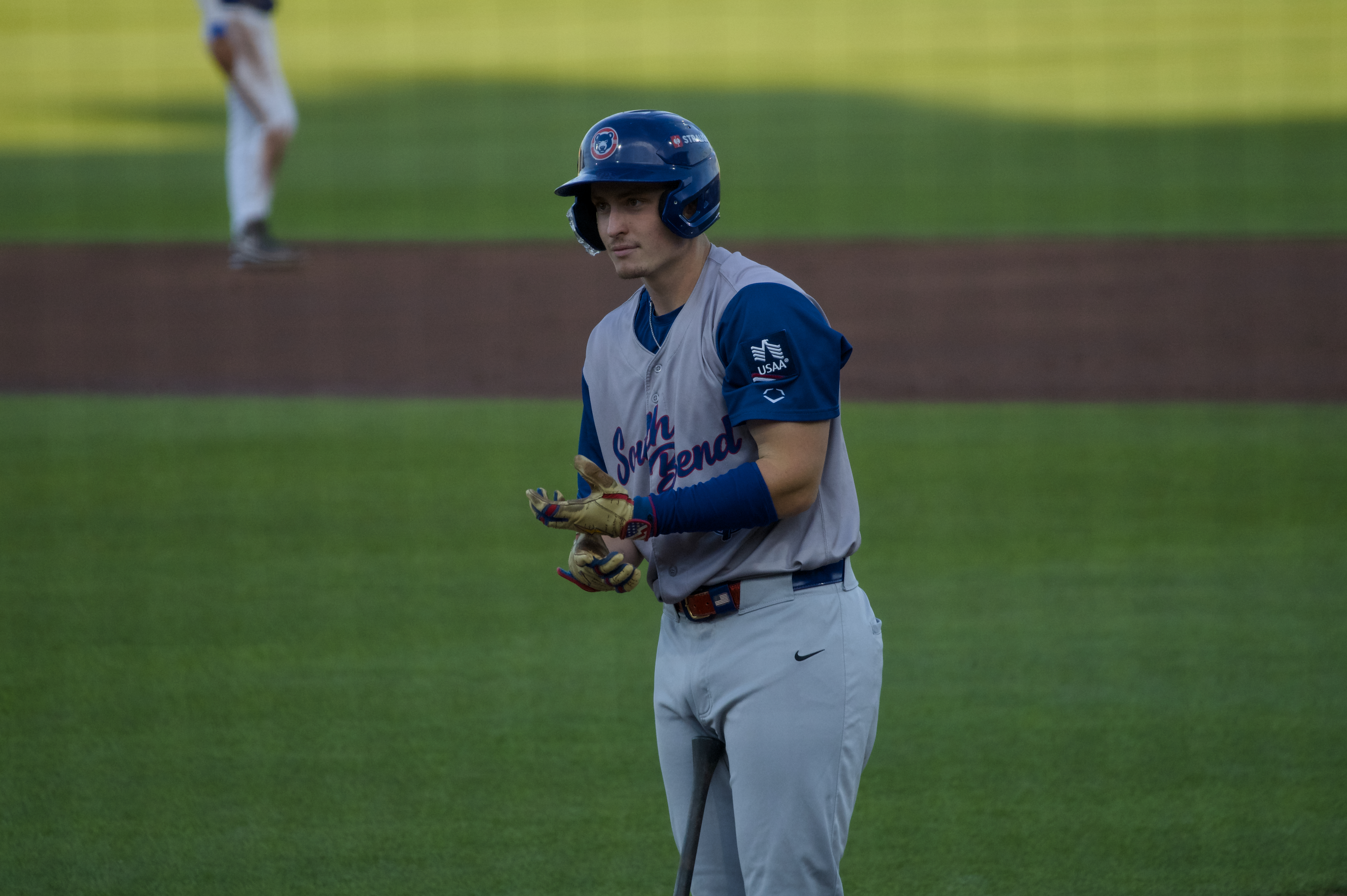
- Hartshorn with the South Bend Cubs in 2026

Chicago Cubs
- Outfielder
- Born: February 2, 2007 (age 19); New York City, U.S.
- Bats: Switch Throws: Left

Josiah Christopher Hartshorn (born February 2, 2007) is an American professional baseball outfielder in the Chicago Cubs organization.

Hartshorn attended Orange Lutheran High School in Orange, California. In 2024, he competed in the All-Star High School Home Run Derby at Globe Life Field. He was selected by the Chicago Cubs in the sixth round of the 2025 Major League Baseball draft.

Hartsorn made his professional debut in 2026 with the Myrtle Beach Pelicans.

- Career statistics from Baseball Reference (Minors)

=== Kane Kepley ===
Kane Kepley

Chicago Cubs
- Outfielder
- Born: February 14, 2004 (age 22); Salisbury, North Carolina, U.S.
- Bats: Left Throws: Left

Kane Charles Kepley (born February 14, 2004) is an American professional baseball outfielder in the Chicago Cubs organization.

Kepley attended South Rowan High School in China Grove, North Carolina. He played his first two years of college baseball at Liberty University before transferring to the University of North Carolina at Chapel Hill for one year. In 2024, he played collegiate summer baseball with the Hyannis Harbor Hawks of the Cape Cod Baseball League, and was named a league all-star. Kepley was selected by the Chicago Cubs in the second round of the 2025 Major League Baseball draft.

Kepley made his professional debut with the Myrtle Beach Pelicans.

- Career statistics from Baseball Reference (Minors)

=== Brody McCullough ===
Brody McCollough

Chicago Cubs
- Pitcher
- Born: June 30, 2000 (age 26); Lexington, North Carolina, U.S.
- Bats: Right Throws: Right

Brody Shane McCullough (born June 30, 2000) is an American professional baseball pitcher in the Chicago Cubs organization.

McCullough played college baseball at Wingate University. He was selected by the Chicago Cubs in the 10th round of the 2022 Major League Baseball draft. The Cubs added him to their 40-man roster after the 2026 season.

- Career statistics from Baseball Reference (Minors)

=== Connor Noland ===
Connor Noland

Chicago Cubs
- Pitcher
- Born: July 20, 1999 (age 27); Greenwood, Arkansas, U.S.
- Bats: Right Throws: Right

Connor Julian Noland (born July 20, 1999) is an American professional baseball pitcher in the Chicago Cubs organization.

Noland was born in Greenwood, Arkansas and lived there until his family moved to Tampa, Florida when he was five. His family moved again to Reno, Nevada when he was 12. Noland initially attended Bishop Manogue High School and was the starting quarterback on the football team as a freshman. After one semester, he moved back to Greenwood and lived with his grandmother and enrolled at Greenwood High School.

Noland played college baseball and college football at Arkansas. He made one start at quarterback against Tulsa during his freshman season. In baseball, Nolan went 3–5 with a 4.02 ERA over 19 starts. After his freshman year he decided to focus solely on baseball. In 2021, Noland made nine pitching appearances, all in relief, and had a 6.91 ERA. As a senior, he made 19 starts and went 8–6 with a 3.65 ERA and 113 strikeouts.

Noland was selected in the 9th round by the Chicago Cubs in the 2022 Major League Baseball draft. He signed with the team on July 23, 2022, and received a $140,000 signing bonus. Noland was assigned to the South Bend Cubs of the High-A Midwest League at the beginning of the 2023 season.

- Career statistics from MLB · Baseball Reference (Minors)
- Arkansas Razorbacks baseball bio
- Arkansas Razorbacks football bio

=== Reginald Preciado ===
Reginald Preciado

Chicago Cubs
- Shortstop
- Born: May 16, 2003 (age 23); Boquerón, Panama
- Bats: Right Throws: Right
Medals
Men's baseball
Representing Panama
U-15 Baseball World Cup
Silver medal – second place	2018 Panama	Team

Reginald Jamel Preciado (born May 16, 2003) is a Panamanian professional baseball shortstop in the Chicago Cubs organization.

Preciado signed with the San Diego Padres as an international free agent in 2019 for a $1.3 million signing bonus. He was then traded to the Cubs along with Zach Davies, Owen Caissie, Ismael Mena, and Yeison Santana for Yu Darvish and Victor Caratini on December 30, 2020.

Preciado was promoted to the Arizona Complex League in the 2021 season, posting a .333/.383/.511/.894 slash line with 3 home runs in 34 games.

- Career statistics from Baseball Reference (Minors)

=== Erian Rodríguez ===
Erian Rodríguez

Chicago Cubs
- Pitcher
- Born: November 23, 2001 (age 24); Panama City, Panama
- Bats: Right Throws: Right

Erian Rodríguez (born November 23, 2001) is a Panamanian professional baseball pitcher in the Chicago Cubs organization. He played for the Panama national baseball team in the 2026 World Baseball Classic.

Rodríguez was born in Panama, but attended Georgia Premier Academy in an effort to move to a junior college. However, after a growth spirt and velocity increase at the prep school, he was drafted by the Cubs in the 13th round of the 2021 MLB draft. He made his professional debut in the Arizona Complex League in the 2022 season.

Rodríguez was promoted to the A-level Myrtle Beach Pelicans in 2023. He would be promoted to the high-A South Bend Cubs in 2024, and the double-A Knoxville Smokies in 2025. In 18 starts across multiple levels in 2025, Rodríguez was 8-6 with a 3.19 ERA.

- Career statistics from Baseball Reference (Minors)

=== Will Sanders ===
Will Sanders

Chicago Cubs
- Pitcher
- Born: March 30, 2002 (age 24); Atlanta, Georgia, U.S.
- Bats: Left Throws: Right

William McKeown Sanders (born March 30, 2002) is an American professional baseball pitcher in the Chicago Cubs organization.

Sanders attended Woodward Academy in College Park, Georgia and played college baseball at the University of South Carolina. He was selected by the Chicago Cubs in the fourth round of the 2023 Major League Baseball draft.

Sanders spent his first professional season in 2024 with the South Bend Cubs Tennessee Smokies. He started 2025 with Tennessee before being promoted to the Iowa Cubs.

- Career statistics from Baseball Reference (Minors)

=== Tyler Schlaffer ===
Tyler Schlaffer

Chicago Cubs
- Pitcher
- Born: May 24, 2001 (age 25); Homewood, Illinois, U.S.
- Bats: Right Throws: Right

Tyler Robert Schlaffer (born May 24, 2001) is an American professional baseball pitcher in the Chicago Cubs organization.

Schlaffer attended Homewood-Flossmoor High School in Flossmoor, Illinois where he played baseball. As a senior in 2019, he went 7-2 with a 1.81 ERA. He was selected by the Chicago Cubs in the ninth round of the 2019 Major League Baseball draft. He signed with the team, forgoing his commitment to play college baseball at the University of Illinois Chicago.

Schlaffer made his professional debut after signing with the Arizona Complex League Cubs, appearing in three games. After not playing a professional game in 2020 due to the cancellation of the season caused by the COVID-19 pandemic, he made 12 starts in 2021 between the Arizona Complex League and the Myrtle Beach Pelicans, going 4–6 with a 4.58 ERA over 55 innings. In 2022, he made 18 starts for Myrtle Beach and went 4–3 with a 3.82 ERA and 84 strikeouts over 75 1/3 innings, and he also made one start for the South Bend Cubs. Schlaffer did not play in 2023 due to injury. He returned to play in 2024 with South Bend and Myrtle Beach and went 3–3 with a 5.29 ERA over 78 1/3 innings. He opened the 2025 season with South Bend, with whom he was named Midwest League Pitcher of the Week, and was promoted to the Knoxville Smokies in July. Over 21 starts between the two teams, Schlaffer went 7–3 with a 3.53 ERA and 102 strikeouts over 104 2/3 innings. He returned to Knoxville for the 2026 season and appeared in 31 games in which he had a 1–7 record, a 4.20 ERA, and 101 strikeouts over 85 2/3 innings.

- Career statistics from Baseball Reference (Minors)

=== Kaleb Wing ===
Kaleb Wing

Chicago Cubs
- Pitcher
- Born: January 12, 2007 (age 19); San Diego, California, U.S.
- Bats: Right Throws: Right

Kaleb Christopher Wing (born January 12, 2007) is an American professional baseball pitcher in the Chicago Cubs organization.

Wing attended Scotts Valley High School in Scotts Valley, California. As a senior in 2025, he had a 1.23 earned run average (ERA) with 79 strikeouts. He committed to play college baseball at Loyola Marymount University as an infielder. Wing was selected by the Chicago Cubs in the fourth round of the 2025 Major League Baseball draft. He signed with the Cubs for $1.5 million.

Wing made his professional debut in 2026 with the rookie-level Arizona Complex League Cubs and was promoted to the Single-A Myrtle Beach Pelicans in May. Across nine starts between the two teams, he had a 0–4 record, a 4.45 ERA, and 42 strikeouts over 28 1/3 innings.

- Career statistics from Baseball Reference (Minors)

== Full Triple-A to Rookie League rosters ==
=== Triple-A ===
Iowa Cubs roster
Players		Coaches/Other
Pitchers: -- Brandon Birdsell; 27 Antoine Kelly *; 29 Grant Kipp; 36 Gabe Klobosits; -- Zac Leigh; 37 Jack Neely; 40 Doug Nikhazy; 38 Connor Noland; -- Will Sanders; 51 Evan Taylor	Catchers: 4 Owen Ayers; 1 Daniel Campos; Infielders: 4 Ben Cowles; Outfielders	Manager: 29 Marty Pevey; Coaches: 52 Tony Cougoule (pitching); 17 Taylor Fortney (hitting); 18 Nick Lovullo (bench); 44 Damon Minor (hitting); 50 Jamie Vermilyea (pitching); 7-day injured list; * On Chicago Cubs 40-man roster; ~ Development list; # Rehab assignment; ∞ Reserve list; ‡ Restricted list; § Suspended list; † Temporarily inactive list; Roster updated November 17, 2026; Transactions; → More rosters: MiLB • International League; → Chicago Cubs minor league players

=== Double-A ===
Knoxville Smokies roster
Players		Coaches/Other
Pitchers: 9 Jackson Brockett; 19 Brooks Caple; 33 Nick Dean; 39 Ethan Flanagan; 44 Jake Knapp; 16 Luis Martinez-Gomez; -- Zane Mills; 33 Grayson Moore; 34 Dawson Netz; 38 Kenyi Perez; 21 Tyler Ras; 4 Vince Reilly; 41 Erian Rodríguez ‡; 16 Yenrri Rojas; 45 Luis Rujano; 43 Marino Santy; 20 Tyler Schlaffer; 40 Connor Schultz; 24 Kevin Valdez; 45 Jacob Wallace	Catchers: 7 Ariel Armas; 3 Colin Hynek; 6 Miguel Useche; Infielders: 25 Edgar Alvarez; 12 Drew Bowser; 3 Angel Cepeda; 8 Josiah Hartshorn; 32 Dom Krupinski; 5 Alex Madera; 1 Karson Simas; 29 Carter Trice; Outfielders: 22 Andy Garriola; 39 Michael Gupton; 2 Kane Kepley; 13 Alex Ramírez	Manager: 28 Lance Rymel; Coaches: 36 Joe Curci (development); 4 Derron Davis (bench); 27 Joe Dillon (hitting); 24 George Thanopoulos (pitching); 37 José Zapata (pitching); 7-day injured list; * On Chicago Cubs 40-man roster; ~ Development list; # Rehab assignment; ∞ Reserve list; ‡ Restricted list; § Suspended list; † Temporarily inactive list; Roster updated November 17, 2026; Transactions; → More rosters: MiLB • Southern League; → Chicago Cubs minor league players

=== High-A ===
South Bend Cubs roster
Players		Coaches/Other
Pitchers: 50 Luke Alwood; 28 Ethan Bell; 30 Pierce Coppola; 44 Noah Edders; 29 Jostin Florentino; 32 Anhuar Garcia; 22 Yoendris Gonzalez; 3 Drew Gray; 32 Eli Jerzembeck; 45 Jackson Kirkpatrick; 34 Edwardo Melendez; 46 Chase Meyer; 8 Nazier Mulé; 40 Braylon Myers; 16 Dominick Reid; 37 Cole Reynolds; -- Brayden Risedorph; 38 Brayden Spears; -- Connor Spencer; 33 JP Wheat; 39 Nate Williams	Catchers: 15 Brennan Hudson; 21 Logan Poteet; 11 Justin Stransky; Infielders: 17 Jose Escobar; 4 Leonel Espinoza; 24 Matt Halbach; 6 Michael Hallquist; 19 Geuri Lubo; 2 Reginald Preciado; Outfielders: 18 Ethan Conrad; 20 Alexey Lumpuy; 5 Christian Olivo; 18 Caden Sorrell; 15 Kade Snell	Manager: 3 Daniel Wasinger; Coaches: 16 Max Anastasio (performance); 36 JC Bonilla (pitching); 18 Henry Haack (pitching); 27 Chris Pieters (hitting); 44 Nate Spears (hitting); 7-day injured list; * On Chicago Cubs 40-man roster; ~ Development list; # Rehab assignment; ∞ Reserve list; ‡ Restricted list; § Suspended list; † Temporarily inactive list; Roster updated November 17, 2026; Transactions; → More rosters: MiLB • Midwest League; → Chicago Cubs minor league players

=== Single-A ===
Myrtle Beach Pelicans roster
Players		Coaches/Other
Pitchers: 27 John Alkire II; 25 Cristopher Aranguren; 55 Daniel Avitia; 3 David Bracho; 3 Jhon Cabral; 12 Kevin Camacho; 49 Jordan Henriquez; 19 Riely Hunsaker; 33 Fenuel James; 17 Connor Knox; -- Thomas Mangus; 44 Luis Mata; 48 Sam Mettert; 35 Ashton Pocol; 44 Emilio Ramos; 54 Freddy Rodriguez; 52 Jubrayker Salaya; 22 Julio Valdez; 30 Geovanny Vasquez; 55 Ariston Veasey; 27 Kaleb Wing; 1 Victor Zarraga	Catchers: 5 Ivan Cespedes; 41 Jhoander Irigoyen; Infielders: 7 Juan Cabada; 11 Fernando Cruz; 33 Darlyn De Leon; 1 Ludwing Espinoza; 51 Alexis Hernandez; 11 Juan Tomas; 53 Corey Nunez; 34 Jose Silva; 32 Derniche Valdez; Outfielders: 13 Derik Alcantara; 4 Eli Lovich; 8 Jan Luis Reyes	Manager: 15 Yovanny Cuevas; Coaches: -- Andrew Betcher (pitching); -- Luis Hernandez (pitching); 45 D'Angelo Jiménez (bench); 6 Kyle Sutherland (development); 28 Roberto Vaz (hitting); 7-day injured list; * On Chicago Cubs 40-man roster; ~ Development list; # Rehab assignment; ∞ Reserve list; ‡ Restricted list; § Suspended list; † Temporarily inactive list; Roster updated November 17, 2026; Transactions; → More rosters: MiLB • Carolina League; → Chicago Cubs minor league players

=== Rookie ===
Arizona Complex League Cubs roster
Players		Coaches/Other
Pitchers: -- Brandon Arvidson; -- Dylan Blomker; -- Colton Book; 82 Kaemyn Franklin; 79 Luis Ghisays; -- Luke Guth; -- Carson Jasa; -- Kippei Makawa; 65 Yander Maria; -- Dylan Marionneaux; -- Ryan Marton; -- Luke McGrath; 81 Lazaro Mena; -- Isaac Morton; -- Griffin Naess; 84 Chaily Ramirez; 37 Eriandys Ramon; 83 Ariel Ramos; 96 Darian Rivero; -- Cade Townsend; -- Cole Tryba; -- Lance Williams	Catchers: 6 Henniel Alcala; -- Emanuel Hernandez; -- Colin Hynek; -- Jhoander Irigoyen; Infielders: -- Myles Bailey; -- Blake Bevis; -- Caden Dulin; 16 Yahil Melendez; -- Corey Nunez; 32 Ezequiel Pena; 13 Leonel Vivas; Outfielders: 16 Freiker Betencourt; -- Harrison Feinberg; -- Grant Gray; 28 Cesar Lugo; 39 Robin Ortiz; 21 Jeury Ramirez; 27 Kotaru Tsunematsu	Manager: 49 Dixon Machado; Coaches: 38 Pablo Arevalo (pitching); 15 Cody Dennis (development); 16 Mario Fernandez (pitching); 27 Marco Romero (hitting); 7 Demetrius Sims (development); 52 Grant Zawadzki (hitting); 7-day injured list; * On Chicago Cubs 40-man roster; ~ Development list; # Rehab assignment; ∞ Reserve list; ‡ Restricted list; § Suspended list; † Temporarily inactive list; Roster updated November 2, 2026; Transactions; → More rosters: MiLB • Arizona Complex League; → Chicago Cubs minor league players

=== Foreign Rookie ===
Dominican Summer League Cubs Blue roster
Players		Coaches/Other
Pitchers: 73 Salvador Burgos; 86 Jider Corpas; 9 Alvin De Leon; 50 Yusef Hanania; -- Erick Hernandez; -- Maykoll Jaspe; 87 Santiago Lopez; 84 Dylan Lozada; 64 Jhosued Marcano; 58 Luis Martinez; 57 Wilfran Ortega; 54 Yamel Pinto; 49 Carlos Rangel; 75 Amilkar Romero; 56 Jose Serva; 78 Johasael Solano; 67 Fleury Soriano; 71 Geovanny Villarroel; -- Luis Zapata	Catchers: 32 Daniel Bastardo; 7 Sergio Patino; Infielders: 11 Bryant Ciriaco; 43 Eduardo Gonzalez; 12 Dylan Guzman; 21 Jaims Martinez; -- Yadier Munoz; 27 Luis Palencia; 8 Luis Santos; 41 Luis Thomas; Outfielders: 25 Juan De Jesus; 44 Emill Olivo; 13 Enrique Oropeza	Manager: -- Enrique Wilson; Coaches: -- Andrws Cruz (coach); -- Raymond Pena (bench); -- Joel Rivera (hitting); -- Jordal Williams (pitching); 7-day injured list; * On Chicago Cubs 40-man roster; ~ Development list; # Rehab assignment; ∞ Reserve list; ‡ Restricted list; § Suspended list; † Temporarily inactive list; Roster updated November 18, 2026; Transactions; → More rosters: MiLB • Dominican Summer League; → Chicago Cubs minor league players

Dominican Summer League Cubs Red roster
Players		Coaches/Other
Pitchers: 67 Jose Avendano; 51 Carlos Barrientos; 80 Josnel Bazardo; 52 Yadier Concepcion; 60 Luis Diaz; 59 Anthony Feliz; 61 Tadeo Gamez; -- Angel Gonzalez; 53 Jose Gonzalez; 55 Esmerbin Guerrero; 48 Oswal Hernandez; -- Rafael Merchan; 62 Luciano Prince; 65 Anderson Ramos; 70 Anderson Rivera; 79 Felix Teran; 82 Ruben Torres	Catchers: 3 Victor Garcia; 36 Johan Gomez; Infielders: -- Luis Abreu; 1 Julio Acosta; 30 Franyel Almanzar; 24 D'Alessandro Barile; 5 Xavier Cadiz; 6 Johan Geraldo; 20 Elerick Gomez; 19 Luis German; 15 Diego Hernandez; 45 Marcos Mateo; 4 Giancarlos Mendoza; -- Rodelvis Santiesteban; 47 Esau Taveras; Outfielders: 17 Albert Moreno; 2 Yanfri Serrano	Manager: Jovanny Rosario; Coaches: -- Jhonny Bethencourt (bench); -- Armando Gabino (pitching); -- Ernesto Irizarry (hitting); 7-day injured list; * On Chicago Cubs 40-man roster; ~ Development list; # Rehab assignment; ∞ Reserve list; ‡ Restricted list; § Suspended list; † Temporarily inactive list; Roster updated November 17, 2026; Transactions; → More rosters: MiLB • Dominican Summer League; → Chicago Cubs minor league players
