= List of Arizona Complex League team rosters =

Below are the full rosters and coaching staff of the 17 teams of Minor League Baseball's Arizona Complex League.

== Arizona Complex League Angels ==
Arizona Complex League Angels roster
Players		Coaches/Other
Pitchers: 95 Adrian Acosta; 53 Milleran Cedano; 83 Andres Cova; 74 Dioris De La Rosa; 55 Brandon Dufault; 68 José Fermín ^{#}*; 12 Will Gervase; 97 Yendy Gomez; 60 Trey Gregory-Alford; 66 Jan Hechavarria; 59 Dylan Jordan; 14 Brett Kerry ^{#}; 48 Davidxon Lara; 57 Garrett McDaniels ^{#}*; 86 Haminton Mendez; 64 Caleb Pendleton; 51 Roman Phansalkar ^{#}; 39 Yokelvin Reyes; 88 Enderjer Sifontes; 90 Ubaldo Soto; 76 Marco Vega; 91 Brayan Vergara	Catchers: 9 Kaden Hopson; 80 Marlon Quintero; 81 Eliezer Rivero; 72 Yeremi Villahermosa; Infielders: 71 Athanael Duarte; 57 Joswa Lugo; 87 Anyelo Marquez; 35 Bryan Martinez; 79 Felix Morrobel; 7 Oswaldo Patino; 99 Victor Rodriguez; Outfielders: 52 Hayden Alvarez; 92 Balian Caraballo; -- Oscar Colás; 67 Samil Dishmey; 94 Lucas Ramirez	Manager: -- Hainley Statia; Coaches: -- Derek Florko (coach); -- Gil Heredia (pitching); -- Ever Magallanes (coach); -- Eddie Menchaca (hitting); -- Ron Villone (pitching); 7-day injured list * On Los Angeles Angels 40-man roster ~ Development list # Rehab assignment ∞ Reserve list ‡ Restricted list § Suspended list † Temporarily inactive list Roster updated June 3, 2025; Transactions → More rosters: MiLB • Arizona Complex League → Los Angeles Angels minor league players

== Arizona Complex League Athletics ==
Arizona Complex League Athletics roster
Players		Coaches/Other
Pitchers: 62 Wilfred Alvarado; 64 Blake Beers #; 78 Paul Chacon; 57 Drew Conover; 93 Derek Corro; 88 Dairon De Jesus; 50 Eliazar De Los Santos; 60 Richard Fernandez; 80 Adriel Gonzalez; 58 Camilo Hernandez; 67 Cole Miller; 85 Alvin Nova; 82 Josnier Parra; 73 Manuel Perez; 51 Jose Pinto; 25 Robert Puason; 92 Pedro Santos #; 36 Josiah Romeo; 71 Yeferson Silva; 48 Roberto Urdaneta	Catchers: 17 Dylan Fien; 11 Cesar Gonzalez; 37 Ramon Landaeta; 26 Luis Marinez; 15 Javier Pariguan; Infielders: 29 Bryan Andrade; 31 Nelson Beltran; 14 Ali Camarillo #; 20 Bjay Cooke; 81 Kevin Dume; 1 Max Durrington; 41 Anderson Machado; 23 Shotaro Morii; 98 Jesus Superlano; Outfielders: 13 Reynaldo De La Paz; 68 Darling Fernandez; 95 Cesar Franco; 6 Pedro Pineda #	Manager: 10 Tim Esmay; Coaches: 7 Mike Benjamin (hitting); 28 Craig Conklin (coach); 30 Gabriel Ozuna (pitching); 47 Rick Rodriguez (pitching); 12 Adam Rosales (hitting); 60-day injured list: 90 Francis Marte; 7-day injured list * On Athletics 40-man roster ~ Development list # Rehab assignment ∞ Reserve list ‡ Restricted list § Suspended list † Temporarily inactive list Roster updated June 2, 2025; Transactions → More rosters: MiLB • Arizona Complex League → Athletics minor league players

== Arizona Complex League Brewers ==
Arizona Complex League Brewers roster
Players		Coaches/Other
Pitchers: 70 Argenis Aparicio; 26 Carlos Carra; 53 Ethan Dorchies; 61 Jayden Dubanewicz; 25 Cesar Espinal; 11 Wenderlyn King; 62 Jose Meneses; 23 Enderson Mercado; 51 Miqueas Mercedes; 28 Daurys Mora; 46 Jose Nova; 66 Joshua Quezada; 67 Tyler Renz; 29 Hayden Robinson; 52 Russell Smith; 64 Griffin Tobias; 21 Ismael Yanez	Catchers: 68 Luis Corobo; 65 Kevin Garcia; 31 Jeferson Quero * #; 13 Freider Rojas; Infielders: 41 Tyler Black * #; 2 Kevin Ereu; 22 Jadyn Fielder; 10 Roderick Flores; 38 Gery Holguin; 6 Pedro Ibarguen; 20 Frederi Montero; 7 Juan Ortuno; 33 Jorge Quintana; Outfielders: 9 Handelfry Encarnacion; 15 Engel Paulino	Manager: 12 Rafael Neda; Coaches: -- Tyson Cooper (development); 53 Luisa Gauci (hitting); 52 Jesús Hernández (pitching); -- Patrick McGuff (pitching); -- Fidel Pena (bench); 60-day injured list: -- Joey Broughton; -- Alexander Vallecillo; 7-day injured list * On Milwaukee Brewers 40-man roster ~ Development list # Rehab assignment ∞ Reserve list ‡ Restricted list § Suspended list † Temporarily inactive list Roster updated June 2, 2025; Transactions → More rosters: MiLB • Arizona Complex League → Milwaukee Brewers minor league players

== Arizona Complex League Cubs ==
Arizona Complex League Cubs roster
Players		Coaches/Other
Pitchers: 87 Rowell Arroyo; 58 Kevin Camacho; 43 Chris Clarke ^{#}; 80 Miguel Cruz; 54 Wilson Cunningham; 76 Fred Fajardo; 49 Ethan Flanagan ^{#}; 79 Jostin Florentino; 86 Anhuar Garcia; 63 Ben Johnson; 37 Ronny Lopez; 47 Thomas Mangus; 44 Yander Maria; 46 Brody McCullough ^{#}; 65 Edwardo Melendez; 64 Wilme Mora; 59 Dawson Netz; 40 Mathew Peters; 75 Luis A. Reyes; 96 Darian Rivero; 71 Jhon Rosario; 84 Geovanny Vasquez; 62 Victor Zarraga	Catchers: 72 Henniel Alcala; 7 Jairo Diaz; 6 Adan Sanchez; Infielders: 82 Fernando Cruz; 2 Ronny Cruz; 19 Edgardo De Leon; 11 Ludwing Espinoza; 13 Albert Gutierrez; 15 Alexis Hernandez; 29 Christopher Paciolla; 30 Derniche Valdez; Outfielders: 20 Derik Alcantara; 61 Joan Delgado; 27 Eli Lovich; 28 Cesar Lugo; 25 Jan Luis Reyes; 22 Felix Stevens ^{#}	Manager: 3 Corey Ray; Coaches: 44 Joe Curci (development); 33 Armando Gabino (pitching); 39 Luis Hernandez (assistant pitching); 11 Chris Pieters (hitting); 60-day injured list: -- Daniel Avitia (full season); -- David Bracho; -- Eduardo Castillo; -- Ben Heller (full season); -- Geuri Lubo (full season); -- Joel Sierra; -- Edward Vargas (full season); 7-day injured list * On Chicago Cubs 40-man roster ~ Development list # Rehab assignment ∞ Reserve list ‡ Restricted list § Suspended list † Temporarily inactive list Roster updated June 5, 2025; Transactions → More rosters: MiLB • Arizona Complex League → Chicago Cubs minor league players

== Arizona Complex League Diamondbacks ==
Arizona Complex League Diamondbacks roster
Players		Coaches/Other
Pitchers: 50 Ryan Bruno ^{#}; 37 Jeison Calvo; 36 Anderson Cardenas; 31 Junior Ciprian; 45 Yilber Díaz *; 28 Jesus Escobar; 35 Jeury Espinal; 15 Abel Fuerte; 43 Travis Garnett; 14 Alvin Guzman; 25 Chung-Hsiang Huang; 34 Onias Jimenez; 33 Walvin Mena; 52 Logan Mercado; 22 Augie Mojica; 57 Eduardo Rodríguez ^{#}*; 10 Kelvin Rosario; 53 Andrew Saalfrank *; 39 Dawel Serda; 29 Josdanner Suarez; 23 Daury Vasquez	Catchers: 9 Moises Alcala; 18 Adrian Del Castillo ^{#}*; 16 Ivan Luciano; 26 René Pinto ^{#}; 1 Alejandro Rios; 2 Carlos Virahonda; Infielders: 4 Eliesbert Alejos; 32 Alexander Benua; 11 Titus Cissell; 24 JD Dix; 5 Jefferson Pena; 8 Enyervert Perez; Outfielders: 17 Pedro Blanco; 21 Pedro Catuy; 27 Bo Walker; 13 Gian Zapata	Manager: -- Juan Francia; Coaches: -- Brad Arnsberg (coach); -- Ronnie Gajownik (coach); 3 Chuy Mendoza (pitching); -- Dylan Olsonawski (pitching); 55 John Pachot (coach); 60-day injured list: 17 Jeffrey Amparo; -- Kyle Ayers; 26 Victor Brea; -- Jairon Digon; -- Vitico Valdez (full season); 7-day injured list * On Arizona Diamondbacks 40-man roster ~ Development list # Rehab assignment ∞ Reserve list ‡ Restricted list § Suspended list † Temporarily inactive list Roster updated June 5, 2025; Transactions → More rosters: MiLB • Arizona Complex League → Arizona Diamondbacks minor league players

== Arizona Complex League Dodgers ==
Arizona Complex League Dodgers roster
Players		Coaches/Other
Pitchers: 46 Isaac Ayon; 66 Javier Bartolozzi; 59 Peter Bonilla; 35 Maddux Bruns #; 55 Jose Cabrera; 52 Luis Carlas; 44 Justin Chambers; 49 Dilan Figueredo #; 22 Tim Fischer; -- Will Gagnon; 22 Wuillians Herrera; 45 Edgar Leon; 43 Jecsua Liborius; 51 William Maynard; 57 Ricardo Montero; 38 Accimias Morales; -- Roiger Mujica; 61 Marlon Nieves; 33 Christian Oliveira; -- Kinn Omosako; 37 Luciano Romero; 80 Emmet Sheehan #; 63 Yori Simarra; 16 Brady Smith; 48 Jesus Tillero; 50 Jose Vasquez	Catchers: 28 Carlos Avila; 8 Angel Diaz; 30 Francisco Espinoza; 23 Abel Lorenzo; Infielders: 7 Moises Bolivar; 62 Bryan Gonzalez; 5 Chase Harlan; 65 Javier Herrera; 17 Elias Medina; 11 Emil Morales; 40 Oswaldo Osorio #; -- Easton Shelton; 27 Kendall Simmons #; Outfielders: 29 Ching-Hsien Ko; 26 Kyle Nevin #; 3 Brendan Tuniak	Manager: 44 Juan Apodaca; Coaches: -- Richard De Los Santos (Pitching); -- Juan Diaz (Hitting); 17 Danny Dorn (Hitting); 13 Johan Garcia (Bench); -- Jose Gutierrez (Performance); -- K.J. Hallgren (Bullpen catcher); -- Kevin Lachance (Hitting); -- Walter Lindo (Performance); -- Umar Male (Bullpen catcher); -- Zach Reks (Hitting); 66 Andres Urbina (Pitching); 7-day injured list * On Los Angeles Dodgers 40-man roster ~ Development list # Rehab assignment ∞ Reserve list ‡ Restricted list § Suspended list † Temporarily inactive list Roster updated June 3, 2025 → More rosters: MiLB • Arizona Complex League → Los Angeles Dodgers minor league players

== Arizona Complex League Giants ==
Arizona Complex League Giants roster
Players		Coaches/Other
Pitchers: 48 Jose Bello; 58 Jan Caraballo; 35 Argenis Cayama; 47 Samir Chires; 23 Luis De La Torre; 21 Ricardo Estrada; 31 Mauricio Estrella; 50 Marlon Franco; 43 Alexander Fuentes; 49 Alix Hernandez; -- Chen-Hsun Lee; 46 Keyner Martinez; 39 Melvin Pineda; 38 Jose Rengel; 40 Johan Rodriguez; -- Nien-Hsi Yang	Catchers: 19 Jesus Alexander; 18 Santiago Camacho; 14 Nomar Diaz; Infielders: 8 Dayson Croes; 6 Javier Francisco; 1 Jhonny Level; 2 Ryan Reckley; 9 Dario Reynoso; Outfielders: 33 Rayner Arias; 5 Angel Guzman; 26 Donovan McIntyre; 17 Andy Polanco; 13 Oliver Tejada	Manager: 35 Jacob Heyward; Coaches: 26 Dalton Hurd (hitting); 39 Joel Johnson (fundamentals); 12 Braxton Lee (hitting); 91 Luis Pino (pitching); 7-day injured list * On San Francisco Giants 40-man roster ~ Development list # Rehab assignment ∞ Reserve list ‡ Restricted list § Suspended list † Temporarily inactive list Roster updated May 22, 2025; Transactions → More rosters: MiLB • Arizona Complex League → San Francisco Giants minor league players

== Arizona Complex League Guardians ==
Arizona Complex League Guardians roster
Players		Coaches/Other
Pitchers: 57 Shane Bieber *#; 58 Yatner Crisostomo; 41 Miguel Flores; 52 Ezequiel Jimenez; 64 Diovel Mariano; 24 Triston McKenzie; 35 Chase Mobley; 12 Tyler Naquin; 57 Joey Oakie; 40 Manuel Osorio; 39 Santiago Peraza; 48 Angel Perez; 47 Erigaldi Perez; 65 Joelvis Perez; 37 José Ramirez; 45 Renil Ramos; 30 Jacob Remily; 50 Raudy Rivera; 62 Erik Sabrowski *#; 54 Cam Schuelke #; 49 Tyler Thornton #; 55 Javi Torres; 71 Kendeglys Virguez #; 60 Julio Zapata #; 36 Keegan Zinn	Catchers: 16 Pedro Dalmagro; 32 Reiner Herrera; 8 Victor Izturis; 29 David Leon; Infielders: 11 Jhorvic Abreus; 23 Luis De La Cruz; 27 Dauri Fernandez; 46 Ángel Genao #; 7 Jonathan Martinez; 6 Gabriel Rodriguez; 1 Johan Rodriguez; Outfielders: 12 Robert Arias; 53 Mason Bolivar; 10 Juneiker Caceres; 15 Yeiferth Castillo; 54 Jaison Chourio #; 17 Yerlin Luis; 28 Heribert Silva; 13 George Valera #	Manager: 9 Juan De La Cruz; Coaches: 22 Cam Hill (pitching); 33 Il Hur (hitting); 44 Anderson Polanco (pitching); 4 Jason Rose (hitting); 2 Chaz Verduzco (bench); 60-day injured list: -- Justin Campbell; -- José Contreras; -- Cameron Sullivan; 7-day injured list * On Cleveland Guardians 40-man roster ~ Development list # Rehab assignment ∞ Reserve list ‡ Restricted list § Suspended list † Temporarily inactive list Roster updated May 30, 2025; Transactions → More rosters: MiLB • Arizona Complex League → Cleveland Guardians minor league players

== Arizona Complex League Mariners ==
Arizona Complex League Mariners roster
Players		Coaches/Other
Pitchers: -- Gage Boehm; 43 Aiden Butler; 21 Juan Cazarez; 33 Hunter Cranton #; 47 Jacob Denner; 18 Gleiner Diaz; 13 Taylor Dollard #; 26 Anderson Guevara; 31 Leon Hunter Jr. #; 27 Noah Manning; 20 Teddy McGraw #; 53 Kendal Meza; 16 Francisco Pazos; 19 Roberto Perez; 44 Ruben Ramirez; 36 Wuilliams Rodriguez; 32 Jose Romero; 29 Steven Sanchez; 40 Chia-shi Shen; 54 Roiber Talavera; 9 Dylan Wilson	Catchers: 8 Sebastian De Andrade; 14 Carlos Gonzalez; 15 Eduardo Ponce; 46 Andruw Salcedo; Infielders: 17 Dustin Crenshaw; 22 Martin Gonzalez; 5 Nik McClaughry; 7 Bryant Mendez; 2 Nathan Rose; Outfielders: 6 Kelvin Alcantara; 4 Juan Cruz; 3 George Feliz	Manager: -- Luis Matias; -- Rico Reyes; Coaches: 7 Chase Miller (hitting); 22 Bryan Pall (pitching); -- Sergio Plasencia (coach); -- Chase Wullenweber (bench); 60-day injured list: -- Gregori Arrieche; -- Thomas Higgins Jr.; -- Juan Jiminez; -- Po-Chun Lin; -- Ruddy Navarro (full season); -- Daniel Ouderkirk; -- Cole Phillips; -- Juan Pinto (full season); -- Connor Prins; -- Eduardo Uscanga; 7-day injured list * On Seattle Mariners 40-man roster ~ Development list # Rehab assignment ∞ Reserve list ‡ Restricted list § Suspended list † Temporarily inactive list Roster updated June 1, 2025; Transactions → More rosters: MiLB • Arizona Complex League → Seattle Mariners minor league players

== Arizona Complex League Padres ==
Arizona Complex League Padres roster
Players		Coaches/Other
Pitchers: 99 Erick Batista; 85 Roberto Burgos; 53 Langston Burkett; 91 Winyer Chourio; 16 Humberto Cruz; 58 Manuel Davila; 73 Ruben Galindo #; 17 Kannon Kemp; 50 Jesus Lopez; 59 Alejandro Lugo; 89 Luis Maracara; 38 Darlin Mendez; 34 Cole Paplham #; 93 Yovannki Pascual; 75 Dariel Polanco; 68 Elvis Reyes; 64 Jimmy Reyes; 30 Tanner Smith; 72 Jordan Valenzuela	Catchers: 8 Jesus Castro; 80 Alcides Hernandez; 71 Yoiber Ocopio; Infielders: 11 Luis De Leon; 33 Kale Fountain; 28 Kevin Hacen; 43 Ismael Javier; 5 Eguy Rosario; 67 Yimy Tovar; 78 Emil Turbi; 39 Miguel Valdez; Outfielders: 21 Jesmaylin Arias; 57 Donte Grant; 97 Gustavo Marquez	Manager: 24 LJhonaldo Pozo; Coaches: 15 Brian Betancourth (bench); 72 Daniel Camarena (pitching); 8 Nolan Earley (hitting); 3 Ruddy Giron (hitting); 17 Yoel Monzon (rehab pitching); 23 Jed Morris (bench); 47 Leo Rosales (pitching); 60-day injured list: 46 Adler Cecil (full season); -- Javier Chacon; 76 Dane Lais; 34 Matthew Watson; 7-day injured list * On San Diego Padres 40-man roster ~ Development list # Rehab assignment ∞ Reserve list ‡ Restricted list § Suspended list † Temporarily inactive list Roster updated June 1, 2025; Transactions → More rosters: MiLB • Arizona Complex League → San Diego Padres minor league players

== Arizona Complex League Rangers ==
Arizona Complex League Rangers roster
Players		Coaches/Other
Pitchers: 56 Angel Anazco; 12 Aidan Anderson #; 50 Jordy Arias; 40 Yeimison Arias; 48 Alejandro Chiquillo; 98 Marc Church #*; 49 Aidan Deakins; 39 Jesus Delgado; 19 David Hagaman; 32 Garrett Horn; 18 Jesus Lafalaise; 20 Enyel Lopez; 30 Frank Martinez; 47 Moises Morales; 44 Jormy Nivar; 52 German Nunez; 41 Maicol Reyes; 35 Adrian Rodriguez #; 38 Geury Rodriguez	Catchers: 15 Sebastian Baquera; 21 Javier Sanchez; 13 Josh Springer; 36 Jhocsuanth Vargas; Infielders: 6 Angel Arredondo; 27 Jax Biggers #; 17 Yolfran Castillo; 3 Devin Fitz-Gerald; 28 Daniel Flames; 33 Jaiker Garcia; 5 Michael Guzman; 16 Trevor Hauver #; 22 Kleimir Lemos; 51 Luis Marquez #; 14 Williams Wong; Outfielders: 25 Andry Batista; 31 Braylin Morel; 1 Rashawn Pinder; 4 Paulino Santana; 8 Deward Tovar	Manager: 45 Nick Janssen; Coaches: 58 Alvaro Castillo (pitching); 43 Matt Chamberlain (development); 23 Mason Milkey (pitching); -- Eli Orana (hitting); -- Daniel Padilla (hitting); 60 Guilder Rodríguez (development); 37 Kevin Torres (development); 60-day injured list: -- Daniel Keaney (full season); 2 Curley Martha; -- Angel Medina; -- Luimy Munoz; 7-day injured list * On Texas Rangers 40-man roster ~ Development list # Rehab assignment ∞ Reserve list ‡ Restricted list § Suspended list † Temporarily inactive list Roster updated May 29, 2025 → More rosters: MiLB • Arizona Complex League → Texas Rangers minor league players

== Arizona Complex League Reds ==
Arizona Complex League Reds roster
Players		Coaches/Other
Pitchers: 39 Jesus Colina; 40 Mauricio Colmenares; 69 Reynardo Cruz; 20 Abraham Gaitan; -- Adrian Herrera; 26 Lisnerkin Lantigua; 76 Christian Lopez; 38 Josue Lopez; 77 Luis Morellis; 71 Nelfri Payano; 72 Ayendy Pena; 70 Samuel Perez; 68 Luis Pimentel; 28 Bryan Salgado; 50 Dominic Scheffler; 46 Tristan Smith; 73 Mendry Solano; 35 Stharlin Torres; 37 Deivi Villafana	Catchers: 9 Yanuel Casiano; 22 Gabriel Gomes; 99 Brandon Jaime; 51 Angelo Mora; Infielders: 12 Alfredo Alcantara; 15 Anielson Buten; 30 Ichiro Cano; 31 Jalen Hairston; 32 Tyson Lewis; 58 Sheng-En Lin; 48 Yael Romero; 21 Rafhlmil Torres; 41 Anthuan Valencia; Outfielders: 49 Drew Davies; 43 Arnaldo Lantigua; 36 Yeycol Soriano	Manager: 44 Gustavo Molina; Coaches: 23 Sebastian Almonte (coach); 34 Fred Corral (pitching); 45 Rayner Oliveros (pitching); 6 Peterson Plaz (hitting); 25 Eric Richardson (hitting); 60-day injured list: -- Joneiker Arellano; 66 Edwin Cervantes (full season); -- Khristian Guevara (full season); -- Jordan Little (full season); 7-day injured list * On Cincinnati Reds 40-man roster ~ Development list # Rehab assignment ∞ Reserve list ‡ Restricted list § Suspended list † Temporarily inactive list Roster updated May 29, 2025; Transactions → More rosters: MiLB • Arizona Complex League → Cincinnati Reds minor league players

== Arizona Complex League Rockies ==
Arizona Complex League Rockies roster
Players		Coaches/Other
Pitchers: 48 Biembenido Brito; 88 Reiver Camacho; 89 Efrain Cubilla; 63 Sam Gerth; 22 Brendan Hardy; 20 Angel Jimenez; 79 Jhon Medina; 84 Moizes Meza; 83 Manuel Olivares; 90 Sandy Ozuna; 49 Wilmis Paulino; 86 Bryan Perez; 87 Engel Silvestre; 92 Gant Starling; 67 Luis Tejeda; 94 Alison Zacarias	Catchers: 25 Cruzmel Arias; 3 Daniel Cope; 5 Jesus Freitez; Infielders: 51 Ashly Andujar; 41 Roldy Brito; 75 Jeremy Ciriaco; 46 Wilder Dalis; 0 Bairon Ledesma; 19 Daniel McElveny; 7 Luis Mendez; Outfielders: 16 Tayler Aguilar; 1 Alessander De La Cruz; 11 Clayton Gray; 6 Aldalay Kolokie; 91 David Lee; 8 Carlos Renzullo; 4 Zac Veen *	Manager: Fred Ocasio; Coaches: -- Julio Campos (hitting); -- Greg Jones (hitting); -- Ryan Kibler (pitching); -- Helmis Rodriguez (pitching); -- Tony Wolters (bench); 60-day injured list: -- Jarrod Cande; 68 Luichi Casilla; 73 Redinson Gomez (full season); -- Doilin Perez; 7-day injured list * On Colorado Rockies 40-man roster ~ Development list # Rehab assignment ∞ Reserve list ‡ Restricted list § Suspended list † Temporarily inactive list Roster updated May 28, 2025; Transactions → More rosters: MiLB • Arizona Complex League → Colorado Rockies minor league players

== Arizona Complex League Royals ==
Arizona Complex League Royals roster
Players		Coaches/Other
Pitchers: 75 Andy Basora; 74 Jezler Baules; 81 Adrian Belen; 65 Sthiven Benitez; 53 Marwys Cabrera; 32 Kyle DeGroat; 37 Weskendry Espinoza; 70 Jose Gutierrez; 38 Brandon Herbold; 67 Jorge Herrera; 59 Rich Hill; 64 Ryan McDonagh; 68 Augusto Mendieta; 79 Jesus Oliveira; 41 Victor Pena; 56 Emmanuel Reyes; 73 Jhon Reyes; 61 Darwin Rodriguez; 77 Edinson Salgado; 49 Yenfri Sosa; 35 Gijs Van Den Brink	Catchers: 24 Ricson Gonzalez; 26 John Lopez; 18 Aldrin Lucas; 2 Jhosmmel Zue; Infielders: 6 Jose Cerice; 0 Darison Garcia; 12 Manuel German; 11 Yandel Ricardo; 1 Ivan Sosa; 9 Jhonayker Ugarte; Outfielders: 21 Noah Barber; 27 Roni Cabrera; -- Darnel Collins ‡; 17 Daniel Jose Lopez; 16 Raimel Medina	Manager: 33 Larry Sutton; Coaches: -- Jesus Atencio (coach); -- Wilson Betemit (hitting); 60 Jesús Delgado (pitching); 62 Ken Knutson (rehab pitching); -- Christopher Marte (pitching); -- Chris Nelson (hitting); 22 Joel Rivera (assistant hitting); 60-day injured list: -- Corey Cousin; -- Isaiah Jackson (full season); 72 Carlos Mateo; -- Coleman Picard; 71 Luis Valdez; 7-day injured list * On Kansas City Royals 40-man roster ~ Development list # Rehab assignment ∞ Reserve list ‡ Restricted list § Suspended list † Temporarily inactive list Roster updated May 21, 2025; Transactions → More rosters: MiLB • Arizona Complex League → Kansas City Royals minor league players

== Arizona Complex League White Sox ==
Arizona Complex League White Sox roster
Players		Coaches/Other
Pitchers: 43 Marco Barrios; 58 Angel Bello; 32 Jordany Chirinos; 54 Bryce Collins #; 75 Jake Curtis; 28 Reudis Diaz; 33 Jeremy Gonzalez; 39 Jommy Hernandez; 36 Connor Housley; 45 Madison Jeffrey; 31 Mathias LaCombe; 29 Denny Lima; 53 Gil Luna; 46 Maximo Martinez; 41 Connor McCullough #; -- Jose S. Mendoza; 59 Yohemy Nolasco #; 77 Tommy Sheehan; 49 Gray Thomas; 40 Garrett Wright #; 30 Fabian Ysalla	Catchers: 21 Stiven Flores; 20 Angelo Hernandez; 24 Alvaro Rios; Infielders: 7 Alexander Albertus #; 85 Sam Antonacci #; 38 Mason Dinesen; 1 Bryce Eblin; 22 Adrian Gil; 10 Jurdrick Profar; 23 Grant Smith; 5 D'Angelo Tejada; Outfielders: 18 Marcelo Alcala; 12 Leandro Alsinois; 6 Albertson Asigen; 60 Nick McLain #	Manager: -- Danny Gonzalez; Coaches: Donovan Clark (performance); Tyler Coolbaugh (performance); -- Mike Gellinger (bench); -- Rob Hardy (pitching); -- Gerardo Olivares (hitting); 60-day injured list: -- Juan Carela; 51 Ethan Hammerberg; -- Blake Larson; -- Colton McIntosh; 25 Joe Perez; 37 Marcelo Valladares; 7-day injured list * On Chicago White Sox 40-man roster ~ Development list # Rehab assignment ∞ Reserve list ‡ Restricted list § Suspended list † Temporarily inactive list Roster updated June 5, 2025; Transactions → More rosters: MiLB • Arizona Complex League → Chicago White Sox minor league players

== See also ==
- Florida Complex League rosters
