= Done with Love =

Done with Love may refer to:

- "Done with Love", song by Teenage Bottlerocket from Freak Out! (Teenage Bottlerocket album)
- "Done with Love", song by Karl Wolf from Stereotype (Karl Wolf album)
- "Done with Love", song by Zedd from True Colors (Zedd album)
