= Stay Rad! =

Studio album by Teenage Bottlerocket
- Released: March 15, 2019
- Studio: The Blasting Room (Fort Collins)
- Genres: Punk rock, pop-punk
- Length: 33:10
- Label: Fat Wreck Chords
- Producer: Andrew Berlin

Teenage Bottlerocket chronology
Stealing The Covers (2017)	Stay Rad! (2019)	Sick Sesh! (2021)

Professional ratings
Review scores
Source	Rating
BeatRoute	(favourable)
Festival Info	3/5 stars
metal1.info	7/10 stars
New Noise	3.5/5 stars

Stay Rad! is the eighth studio album by the punk band Teenage Bottlerocket. The album was released by Fat Wreck Chords on March 15, 2019, on CD and LP. Stay Rad! is the first album consisting of original material since the death of drummer Brandon Carlisle, who died in late 2015.

== Background ==
Stay Rad! is the first album by Teenage Bottlerocket consisting of original material since Tales from Wyoming (2015). In 2017 Stealing The Covers was released, an album exclusively consisting of cover songs. The title of the album, Stay Rad!, is inspired by a former roadie of the band, who would wear a hat saying "stay rad".

On January 18 it was announced by Fat Wreck Chords that Teenage Bottlerocket would put out a new studio album on March 15 that year called Stay Rad!. A new song, "I Wanna be a Dog", was made available for streaming.

On February 20 the song "Everything to Me" was made available for streaming. An accompanying music video was released as well.

On March 14, a day before the official release, the entire album was made available for streaming via Alternative Press.

A video for "I Wanna Be a Dog" was released on August 21, 2019.

== Track listing ==
Stay Rad!! track listing
No.	Title	Length
1.	"You Don't Get the Joke"	2:10
2.	"Death Kart"	2:37
3.	"Everything to Me"	2:57
4.	"I Wanna Be a Dog"	1:48
5.	"Night of the Knuckleheads"	1:54
6.	"Creature from the Black Metal Lagoon"	2:44
7.	"Anti-Social Media"	2:06
8.	"Wild Hair (Across My Ass)"	1:57
9.	"The First Time That I Did Acid Was the Last Time That I Did Acid"	2:35
10.	"I Want to Kill Clint Carlin"	2:01
11.	"I'll Kill You Tomorrow"	2:53
12.	"Stupid Song"	2:39
13.	"Little Kid"	2:04
14.	"I Never Knew"	2:45
Total length:		33:10

== Personnel ==
=== Performers ===
- Kody Templeman – guitar, vocals
- Ray Carlisle – guitar, vocals
- Miguel Chen – bass
- Darren Chewka – drums

=== Production ===
- Andrew Berlin – mixing, engineering, producing
- Sergie Loobkoff – layout
- Jason Livermore – mastering
- Jamy Cabre – photography

== Charts ==
Chart (2019)	Peak position
US Independent Albums (Billboard)	31
US Heatseekers Albums (Billboard)	15
