= Fischer Paper Products =

- Type: Private
- Founded: Antioch, Illinois; United States (1972)
- Headquarters: Antioch, Illinois, U.S.
- Area served: Nationwide
- Key people: Josh Fischer, President
- Products: Foodservice paper products
- Revenue: $ 25 million
- Website: www.fppi.net

Fischer Paper Products is a family-owned company that produces stock bags and flexible packaging for the foodservice industry. To date, the number of pinch-bottom bags it has produced is in the billions as it currently makes over 1.5 billion per year.

== History ==
The company was founded in Antioch, Illinois by William A. Fischer in 1972. Initially, the customer base was local to Chicago and the Midwest, but into the 1980s, it began to expand.

A now-closed facility was opened in Tampa to facilitate expansion. In 2011, the company opened another facility in Waukegan, Illinois. The company now serves customers throughout the United States.

== See also ==
- Continental Packaging Solutions
