= South Bend Cubs =

American Minor League baseball team

- Founded in 1988; South Bend, Indiana
Team logo
Cap insignia

Minor league affiliations
- Class: High-A (2021–present)
- Previous classes: Class A (1988–2020)
- League: Midwest League (1988–present)
- Division: West Division

Major league affiliations
- Team: Chicago Cubs (2015–present)
- Previous teams: Arizona Diamondbacks (1998–2014); Chicago White Sox (1988–1997)

Minor league titles
- League titles (5): 1989; 1993; 2005; 2019; 2022
- Division titles (8): 1989; 1990; 1993; 2001; 2005; 2008; 2019; 2022
- First-half titles (6): 1989; 2004; 2005; 2013; 2016; 2026
- Second-half titles (7): 1990; 1993; 2003; 2005; 2008; 2014; 2022

Team data
- Name: South Bend Cubs (2015–present)
- Previous names: South Bend Silver Hawks (1994–2014); South Bend White Sox (1988–1993)
- Colors: Royal blue, red, white
- Mascots: Stu D. Baker & Ivy
- Ballpark: Four Winds Field at Coveleski Stadium (1988–present)
- Owner/ Operator: Andrew T. Berlin
- General manager: Nick Brown
- Manager: Daniel Wasinger
- Website: milb.com/south-bend

The South Bend Cubs are a Minor League Baseball team of the Midwest League and the High-A affiliate of the Chicago Cubs. They are located in South Bend, Indiana, and play their home games at Four Winds Field at Coveleski Stadium.

The team was originally known as the South Bend White Sox from 1988 to 1993 during their affiliation with the Chicago White Sox, a partnership that lasted until 1997. They were called the South Bend Silver Hawks from 1994 to 2014. From 1998 to 2014, they were affiliates of the Arizona Diamondbacks. They then became an affiliate of the Chicago Cubs and became the South Bend Cubs in 2015.

== History ==
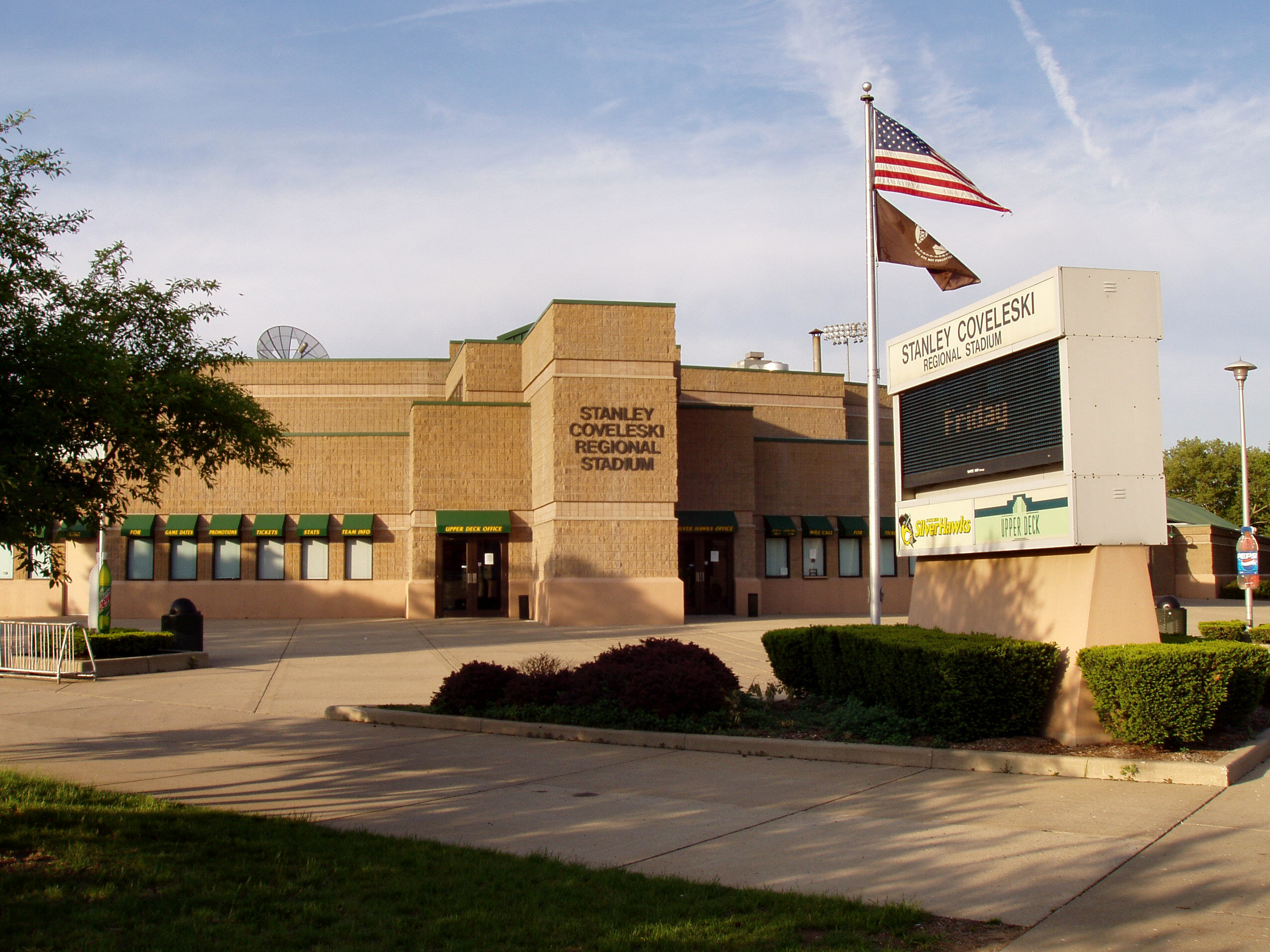
Four Winds Field in South Bend

South Bend, Indiana, was awarded a Midwest League franchise in 1988. Originally affiliated with the Chicago White Sox and bearing the name of the parent club, the team was renamed in 1994. The name "Silver Hawks" was chosen as an homage to the once popular Studebaker Silver Hawk automobile, which was manufactured in South Bend.

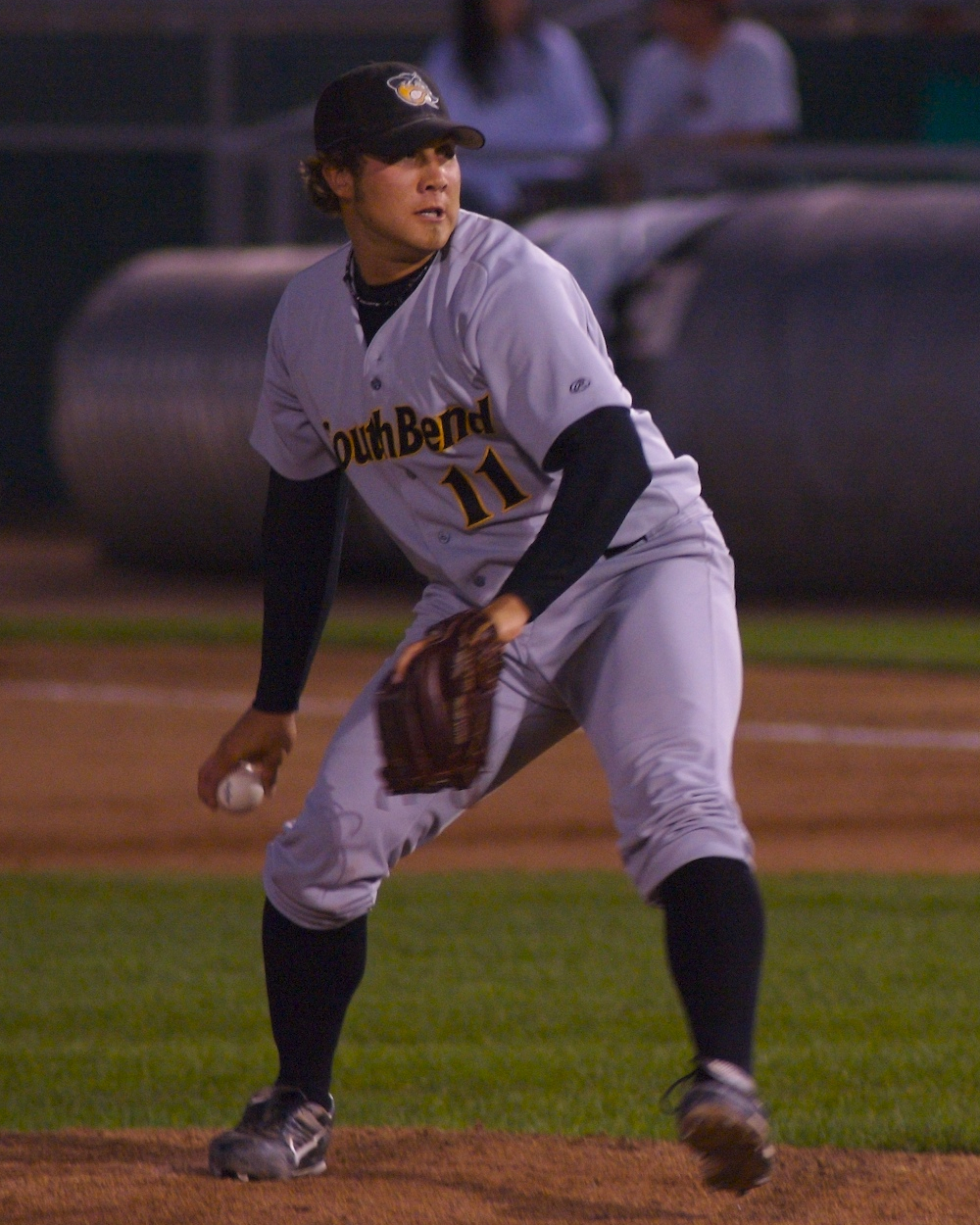
Reid Mahon with the Silver Hawks in 2007

Notable former players include Brandon Webb, and Justin Upton, the number 1 overall draft pick in 2005.

The team's home park is Four Winds Field at Coveleski Stadium. The stadium was built in 1987 and named for Stanley Coveleski, the Hall of Fame pitcher who retired to South Bend after a career in major league baseball that included pitching three complete games to help the Cleveland Indians win the 1920 World Series. On September 5, 2013, the South Bend Silver Hawks announced an agreement with the Pokagon Band of Potawatomi Indians, owners of Four Winds Casinos, for naming rights to the field. The field is now known as Four Winds Field. As part of the agreement, a permanent bronze memorial bearing the name and likeness of Stanley Coveleski is located at the main entrance in his honor.

Despite playing through rumors of sale and relocation in the near future to Marion, Illinois, the Silver Hawks managed a championship season in 2005, beating the Wisconsin Timber Rattlers and winning the 2005 Midwest League Championship. The team also won league titles in 1989 and 1993.

Former Indiana Governor (and former South Bend Mayor) Joe Kernan formed an investment group to purchase the Silver Hawks in 2005. At the time, Kernan made it clear that a principal objective of the group was to keep the team from leaving South Bend.

=== New ownership ===
In November 2011, Andrew T. Berlin of Chicago, a limited partner of the Chicago Cubs and Chairman/CEO of Chicago-based Berlin Packaging and the new owner of the team, ensured his commitment to the city of South Bend by signing a 20-year cumulative lease agreement for the use of Coveleski Stadium. He then added a public commitment to the citizens of the region that he would invest $2.5 million of his own money to make upgrades to the city-owned stadium. This investment resulted in the construction of The Ivy at Berlin Place, a $22 million apartment complex consisting of 121 apartments overlooking the stadium's left field, which opened in 2019.

=== Chicago Cubs ===
On September 18, 2014, the Silver Hawks and Chicago Cubs signed a four-year player-development contract through 2018. Team Owner Andrew Berlin said in a statement, "Today is a turning point. I made a promise to the local community and government officials who welcomed me with open arms three years ago. I promised that I would return the team to its former glory days. And I promised that I'd do everything I could to bring people back to South Bend and prove that this is a wonderful place to invest in." As a result of the name change and new affiliation with the Cubs, team merchandise sales increased by upwards of 700% of their previous totals.

With the launch of the Marquee Sports Network, Marquee indicated that a package of the team's games would be carried on the channel while seeking carriage in the South Bend area.

In conjunction with Major League Baseball's restructuring of Minor League Baseball in 2021, the Cubs were organized into the High-A Central and remained a Chicago affiliate. In 2022, the High-A Central became known as the Midwest League, the name historically used by the regional circuit prior to the 2021 reorganization. The Cubs won their second Midwest League championship in three seasons (the 2020 season was not played due to the COVID-19 pandemic) over the Lake County Captains by winning back-to-back road games after losing the first game of the best-of-three series at home.

== Awards ==
After setting attendance records during the 2015 season, the South Bend Cubs won the 42nd John H. Johnson President's Award as the minor league's "most complete franchise". The president of the team, Joe Hart, said, "To be selected for this prestigious award over some of the best franchises across the nation is extremely humbling."

== Mascot ==
The team has two mascots. One is Stu the Cub, who was selected following an online fan vote prior to Opening Day. The other is Swoop the Silver Hawk, who was the mascot when the team was known as the Silver Hawks, and was kept after the name change. Like the former Silver Hawks team name, Stu's name derives from Studebaker, the defunct automobile manufacturer once based in South Bend.

On February 22, 2024, the Cubs announced that Swoop would be retired at the conclusion of the 2024 season, leaving Stu as the sole mascot. Though, at the end of the 2024 season, the Cubs would introduce a second, female bear mascot named Ivy, named after the famous Ivy at Wrigley Field

== Roster ==
South Bend Cubs roster
Players	Coaches/Other
Pitchers: 50 Luke Alwood; 28 Ethan Bell; 30 Pierce Coppola; 44 Noah Edders; 29 Jostin Florentino; 32 Anhuar Garcia; 22 Yoendris Gonzalez; 32 Eli Jerzembeck; 45 Jackson Kirkpatrick; 34 Edwardo Melendez; 46 Chase Meyer; 8 Nazier Mulé; 40 Braylon Myers; 16 Dominick Reid; 37 Cole Reynolds; 41 Alfredo Romero; 38 Brayden Spears; 25 Adam Stone; 33 JP Wheat; 39 Nate Williams; Catchers: 15 Brennan Hudson; 21 Logan Poteet; 11 Justin Stransky; Infielders: 17 Jose Escobar; 4 Leonel Espinoza; 24 Matt Halbach; 6 Michael Hallquist; 19 Geuri Lubo; 2 Reginald Preciado; Outfielders: 18 Ethan Conrad; 20 Alexey Lumpuy; 18 Caden Sorrell; 15 Kade Snell	Manager: 3 Daniel Wasinger; Coaches: 16 Max Anastasio (performance); 36 JC Bonilla (pitching); 18 Henry Haack (pitching); 27 Chris Pieters (hitting); 44 Nate Spears (hitting); 60-day injured list: -- Evan Aschenbeck; 3 Drew Gray; 5 Christian Olivo; -- Brayden Risedorph; -- Connor Spencer; 7-day injured list; * On Chicago Cubs 40-man roster; ~ Development list; # Rehab assignment; ∞ Reserve list; ‡ Restricted list; § Suspended list; † Temporarily inactive list; Roster updated September 16, 2026; Transactions; → More rosters: MiLB • Midwest League; → Chicago Cubs minor league players

== Playoffs ==
Season	Quarterfinals	Semifinals	Finals
1989	-	W, 2–0, Rockford	W, 3–0, Springfield
1990	-	W, 2–0, Madison	L, 3–1, Quad City
1993	-	W, 2–0, Rockford	W, 3–1, Clinton
2001	W, 2–0, Michigan	W, 2–0, Dayton	L, 1–0, Kane County
2003	L, 2–0, Lansing	-	-
2004	W, 2–0, Fort Wayne	L, 2–0, West Michigan	-
2005	W, 2–0, Southwest Michigan	W, 2–0, West Michigan	W, 3–2, Wisconsin
2006	L, 2–0, Lansing	-	-
2007	W, 2–1, Dayton	L, 2–0, West Michigan	-
2008	W, 2–1, West Michigan	W, 2–0, Dayton	L, 2–0, Burlington
2009	L, 2–1, Fort Wayne	-	-
2013	W, 2–0, Great Lakes	W, 2–1, Fort Wayne	L, 3–0, Quad Cities
2016	L, 2–1, West Michigan	-	-
2019	W, 2–0, Bowling Green	W, 2–0, Great Lakes	W, 3–0, Clinton
2022	-	W, 2–1, Cedar Rapids	W, 2–1, Lake County
2026	L, 2–0, Quad Cities	-	-

== Notable alumni ==
Hall of Fame alumni

- Carlton Fisk (1992) Inducted, 2000

Notable alumni

- James Baldwin (1992) MLB All-Star
- George Bell (1993) 3 x MLB All-Star; 1988 AL Most Valuable Player
- Jason Bere (1991) MLB All-Star
- David Bote (2015)
- Archie Bradley (2012)
- Chris Capuano (2000)
- Mike Cameron (1992) MLB All-Star
- Dylan Cease (2017)
- Ryan Cook (2009) MLB All-Star
- Joey Cora (1990, 1994) MLB All-Star
- Pete Crow-Armstrong (2022) MLB All-Star
- David Delucci (2000)
- Brandon Drury (2013)
- Scott Effross (2016)
- Scott Eyre (1994)
- Terry Francona (1992, MGR) 2 x AL Manager of the Year (2013, 2016); Manager: 2 x World Series Champion - Boston Red Sox (2004, 2007)
- Carlos Gonzalez (2004–2005) 3 x MLB All-Star; 2010 NL Batting Title
- Ian Happ (2015)
- Scott Hairston (2002)
- Roberto Hernandez (1989) 2 x MLB All-Star
- Ender Inciarte (2012) MLB All-Star
- Eloy Jiménez (2016)
- Al Levine (1992)
- Wade Miley (2009) MLB All-Star
- Miguel Montero (2004) 2 x MLB All-Star
- Lyle Overbay (2000)
- Gerardo Parra (2006)
- Brad Penny (1997) 2 x MLB All-Star
- A.J. Pollock (2009) MLB All-Star
- Scott Radinsky (1989, 1995)
- Mark Reynolds (2004–2005)
- Gleyber Torres (2015) 2 x MLB All-Star
- Dan Uggla (2002) 3 x MLB All-Star
- Justin Upton (2006) 4 x MLB All-Star
- Jose Valverde (1999–2000) 3 x MLB All-Star
- Brandon Webb (2000) 3 x MLB All-Star; 2006 NL Cy Young Award
- Bob Wickman (1990) 2 x MLB All-Star

== In popular culture ==
B-Roll footage of a game between the West Michigan Whitecaps and the then South Bend Silver Hawks at Fifth Third Ballpark, was aired in Champ's Whammy! home runs scene in Anchorman 2: The Legend Continues. Officials with the West Michigan Whitecaps were unaware they would be featured in the movie and only found out after the movie was released in December 2013.
