= Mutilate Me =

Mutliate Me

EP by Teenage Bottlerocket
- Released: April 12, 2011
- Recorded: August 30, 2010 and January 2, 2011
- Studio: The Blasting Room (Fort Collins)
- Genre: Pop punk, skate punk
- Length: 5:22
- Label: Fat Wreck Chords
- Producer: Andrew Berlin and Teenage Bottlerocket

Teenage Bottlerocket chronology
They Came from the Shadows (2009)	Mutliate Me (2011)	Freak Out! (2012)

Mutliate Me is an EP by Teenage Bottlerocket. It was released on April 12, 2011 on Fat Wreck Chords and recorded at The Blasting Room with Andrew Berlin. "Henchman", a Bad Religion cover, was recorded on August 30, 2010 with the intent of appearing on Germs of Perfection, a Bad Religion tribute put together by Spin Magazine, but it was not included on that compilation. The other two songs, "Mutilate Me" and "Punk House of Horror", were recorded on January 2, 2011 and were re-released on the band's next album Freak Out!.

It was released on vinyl in three versions: black and red vinyl, each with red lettering on the cover, and blue vinyl with blue lettering. It was also released to digital music stores.

== Track listing ==
Side A
No.	Title	Writer(s)	Length
1.	"Mutilate Me"	Ray Carlisle	2:40

Side B
No.	Title	Writer(s)	Length
1.	"Punk House of Horror"	Kody Templeman	1:37
2.	"Henchman" (Bad Religion cover)	Greg Graffin	1:05

== Personnel ==
- Kody Templeman – guitar, vocals
- Ray Carlisle – guitar, vocals
- Miguel Chen – bass
- Brandon Carlisle – drums
- Andrew Berlin – engineer, mixer
