= Total (Teenage Bottlerocket album) =

Studio album by Teenage Bottlerocket
- Released: 12 April 2005
- Recorded: October 2004–January 2005
- Studio: The Blasting Room (Fort Collins)
- Genre: Punk rock
- Length: 29:43
- Label: Red Scare

Teenage Bottlerocket chronology
Another Way (2003)	Total (2005)	Warning Device (2008)

Total is the second album by the American pop punk band Teenage Bottlerocket. It was released on April 12, 2005, on Red Scare Records. The album was recorded at The Blasting Room by Andrew Berlin and Bill Stevenson. "Radio" and "Blood Bath at Burger King", which were previously released on a split 7-inch with Prototipes, were recorded October 29 and 30, 2004. The rest of the songs were recorded December 18–23, 2004 and January 3–6, 2005.

Three songs that originally appeared on Another Way, the band's previous album, were re-recorded during the Total sessions: "Rebound", which appears on the album, "Be Stag", which only appears on the vinyl version of the album, and "Pull the Plug", which was released on the Take Action! Vol. 5 compilation. Additionally, "Go Away" was also re-recorded for this album, originally appearing on a split 7-inch with Bill the Welder.

== Reception ==
Professional ratings
Review scores
Source	Rating
Allmusic	4/5 stars
Punknews.org	4.5/5 stars

Corey Apar for AllMusic says, "Total is right up at the top with the best pop-punk out there...", comparing the band's sound to that of the Ramones. Punknews.org ranked the album at number 18 on their list of the year's 20 best releases.

== Track listing ==
=== CD ===
1. "Radio" – 2:23
2. "So Cool" – 2:36
3. "Stupid Games" – 2:27
4. "Fall for Me" – 3:02
5. "Crashing" – 1:23
6. "Lost in Space" – 2:02
7. "Go Away" – 2:14
8. "Rebound" – 2:18
9. "Blood Bath at Burger King" – 2:27
10. "Veronica " – 1:15
11. "Repeat Offender" – 2:20
12. "A Bomb" – 1:38
13. "So Far Away" – 3:38

=== Vinyl ===
Side A

1. "Radio" – 2:23
2. "So Cool" – 2:36
3. "Stupid Games" – 2:27
4. "Fall for Me" – 3:02
5. "Crashing" – 1:23
6. "Lost in Space" – 2:02
7. "Be Stag" – 2:02
  - Vinyl exclusive track

Side B

1. "Go Away" – 2:14
2. "Rebound" – 2:18
3. "Blood Bath at Burger King" – 2:27
4. "Veronica " – 1:15
5. "Repeat Offender" – 2:20
6. "A Bomb" – 1:38
7. "So Far Away" – 3:38

== Personnel ==
- Ray Carlisle – bass, vocals
- Kody Templeman – guitar, vocals
- Joel Pattinson – guitar, back ups
- Brandon Carlisle – drums

== In popular culture ==
- The song Crashing was featured in the 2009 video game, Skate 2.
