= Omer Muñoz =

Venezuelan baseball player and coach

Omer Enrique (Molleda) Muñoz (born June 3, 1966 in Maracaibo, Venezuela) served as the interim first base coach for the Chicago White Sox in 2010 while Harold Baines recovered from right knee replacement surgery. He has also played, coached and managed in the minor leagues.

== Playing career ==
Muñoz played from 1985 to 1996 consecutively, save for the 1986 season. In 741 minor league games, the middle infielder hit .264 with 12 home runs.

== Managing career ==
Muñoz managed the AZL Mariners from 2000 to 2001, the Everett Aqua Sox in 2002 (replacing manager Robert Hansen partway through the season), the Bakersfield Blaze in 2003 and Kannapolis Intimidators in 2006.
