= Berlin Packaging =

American packaging corporation

- Type: Privately held company
- Industry: Packaging
- Predecessor: Alco Packaging, Riekes Container
- Founded: 1988; 38 years ago
- Founder: Andrew T. Berlin
- Headquarters: Chicago, Illinois, United States
- Area served: United States, Canada, Italy, France, Spain, Germany, the Netherlands, Greece, Denmark, UK, South Africa, and China
- Key people: William J. Hayes, Global CEO & President
- Products: Packaging, warehousing, containers
- Owner: Oak Hill Capital Partners (from 2014)
- Website: www.berlinpackaging.com

Berlin Packaging is a supplier of packaging products and services. The global corporate headquarters is located in Chicago, Illinois. Its customers include companies in the beverage, food, personal care, beauty, pharmaceutical, household care, industrial, and coatings sectors.

As of 2026, the firm had 130+ sales offices and warehouses across the world with locations in the United States, Canada, Mexico, Italy, France, Spain, Germany, the Netherlands, Greece, Denmark, UK, Ireland, Albania, Bulgaria, Romania, Switzerland, Poland, South Africa, China, Japan, and South Korea.

== History ==
=== Foundation ===
Berlin Packaging was formed in 1988 when lawyer Andrew T. Berlin joined his father in purchasing Alco Packaging, a longtime Chicago-based container company, which was renamed Berlin Packaging. Alco Packaging earned $69 million in annual sales at the time, and its roots trace back to 1898, when Riekes Container was founded, a firm purchased by Alco Packaging in 1975.

=== Acquisitions and growth ===
In 2000, Berlin Packaging acquired Knap-Pac Containers, a wholesale provider of industrial and personal care packaging.

In 2003, it purchased Freund Container, a packaging, closure and industrial-supplies distributor, maintaining it as an operating division.

In 2010, the firm acquired two companies: All-Pak Inc. of Bridgeville, Pennsylvania, a supplier of rigid packaging products and services, and Continental Packaging Solutions, a multinational supplier of glass and plastic containers and closures headquartered in Chicago. Both companies were merged into Berlin Packaging's larger packaging business.

In 2012, Berlin Packaging acquired two more companies: Lerman Container, a Connecticut-based packaging supplier, and United States Container Corporation, a California-based packaging distributor focused on industrial applications. Again, both companies were merged into Berlin Packaging's overall enterprise.

In 2015, the company made another two acquisitions: Vivid Packaging, a Cleveland-based packaging supplier, and Diablo Valley Packaging, a $125 million supplier with an emphasis on glass packaging.

In 2016, Berlin Packaging acquired Bruni Glass, a manufacturer of premium and specialty glass packaging for the spirits, wine, food, and gourmet markets. At the time, Bruni had sales of $150 million across 7,000 customers and 100 countries. This acquisition expanded Berlin Packaging's presence in Europe as well as added locations in Canada, the United States and China.

In 2018, Berlin Packaging extended its European presence with the acquisition of England-based H. Erben Ltd, a supplier of closures, packaging, and packaging equipment to the food and drink sectors. H. Erben Ltd. also brought locations in South Africa and California. The company was re-branded as Bruni Erben, a Berlin Packaging Company.

In April 2019, Berlin Packaging continued to extend its European presence with the acquisition of Verrerie Calvet, a packaging supplier strategically located in Aimargues, France, the heart of Southern France’s food region. Verrerie Calvet brought experience in packaging for wine, spirits, olive oil, and gourmet seasonings, marinades and sauces.

In September 2019, Berlin Packaging acquired Vincap B.V. and Adolfse Packaging B.V. (jointly, Vincap & Adolfse), an important packaging supplier strategically located in Utrecht, Netherlands. In September 2019, Berlin Packaging also announced the acquisition of Vetroservice Srl, a packaging supplier strategically located in the heart of central Italy's food and olive oil region. In October 2019, Berlin Packaging announced the acquisition of Vidrimon, a premier supplier of olive oil bottles and innovative glass packaging for Southern Europe. In October 2019, Berlin Packaging also acquired Netherlands based Novio Packaging Group B.V. This strategic transaction significantly strengthened Berlin Packaging’s European plastic offering, enhanced its expertise in personal care, pharmaceutical, food, and sports nutrition verticals, and expanded its northern European footprint.

In October 2020, Berlin Packaging announced the acquisition of Vinkova B.V., a Netherlands-based glass packaging supplier with expertise in food and beverage verticals. This strategic transaction, which marked Berlin’s eighth acquisition in Europe since 2016, strengthens the company’s glass offering in northern Europe. That same year in November, Berlin Packaging announced the acquisition of Consolidated Bottle Corporation, a packaging supplier in Canada. The transaction expanded Berlin Packaging’s footprint in Canada. In December 2020, Berlin Packaging announced the purchase of Repli and Penta Packaging, two companies in plastic packaging. Repli, based in Barcelona, Spain, and Penta Packaging, based in Bergamo, Italy, expanded Berlin Packaging's product portfolio to several key end markets, including industrial, specialty chemicals, food and beverage, food care. household, cosmetic and pharmaceutical. In December 2020, Berlin Packaging also announced the acquisition of Newpack, a glass packaging company based in Savona, Italy. Newpack was Berlin Packaging's tenth European acquisition since 2016.

In February 2021, Berlin Packaging announced the acquisitions of Sodis-Uhart and Audoubert, two historic companies operating in the glass and metal packaging markets in the South of France. In March 2021, Berlin Packaging announced the acquisition of Roma International, a historical company based in England, which provided better geographic coverage in the Cosmetics and Personal Care segment. By joining Berlin Packaging, Roma International further expanded Berlin's capacity to cover the cosmetics and personal care market in Northern Europe in addition to the Group's global presence. In March 2021, Berlin Packaging also announced the acquisition of Glass Line, a Savona, Italy based supplier of glass and metal packaging specializing in the food and beverage end-markets. In April 2021, Berlin Packaging announced the acquisition of Raepak. The addition of Raepak strengthened Berlin's operations in the cosmetics and personal care markets in the United Kingdom. In June 2021, Berlin Packaging announced the acquisition of Elias Valavanis S.A. to the Berlin Packaging Family, the company's 15th acquisition in Europe. The addition of Elias Valavanis expanded Berlin's global footprint to include the Balkans and strengthened existing business in the Mediterranean. In June 2021, Berlin Packaging also announced the acquisition of Cannasupplies. This acquisition added significant expertise in the Canadian cannabis end-market and allows Berlin to better serve customers by expanding cannabis packaging product offering.

In August 2021, Berlin Packaging announced the acquisition of Juvasa Group. The addition of Juvasa Group expanded Berlin's global footprint in Iberia and the Canary Islands and brought new design and e-commerce capabilities. In December 2021, the Berlin Packaging acquired the French wine bottle manufacturer Gerfran SAS.

In January 2022, Berlin Packaging announced the acquisition of Le Parfait, a French company known for their iconic glass jars. The acquisition strengthened Berlin Packaging’s position as a supplier of high-quality glass containers in the business-to-business (B2B) market while simultaneously gaining share in the business-to-consumer (B2C) market. In January 2022, Berlin Packaging announced the acquisition of Premi S.p.A., a Milan-based company specializing in the supply of packaging products for the beauty and cosmetic industry.

In March 2022, Berlin Packaging announced the acquisition of United Bottles & Packaging, a Canadian-based distributor of high-quality glass bottles and closures for the food and beverage end markets.

In April 2022, Berlin Packaging announced the acquisition of Panvetri, a family-owned supplier of glass and metal packaging for the wine and olive oil industries.

In June 2022, Berlin Packaging announced the acquisition of Verrerie du Comtat, a supplier of glass packaging for the French wine and olive oil end markets. It also announced the acquisition of Andler Packaging, a plastic, glass, and metal packaging product distributor. In June 2022, Berlin Packaging also announced the acquisition of Vidrierías Pérez Campos SL, a family-owned Spanish distributor of glass packaging for the olive oil, home fragrance, and spirits markets. This was Berlin Packaging's 5th global acquisition of 2022. In July that year, it acquired Jansy, a provider of turnkey packaging for the health and beauty industry.

In September 2022, it acquired StyleGlass, a Thessaloniki-based company specializing in decoration of glass packaging for the food, beverage, beauty, and pharmaceutical markets. In October, it acquired DiscoGlass, a supplier based in Merpins, France, serving the high-end spirits and wine markets, particularly the cognac sector. The company also completed the acquisition of Bark Packaging Group, a Northern European supplier of industrial, flexible, and UN-certified packaging.

In 2023, Berlin Packaging expanded in Greece and South Korea. In July, it acquired Coropoulis Packaging SA, an Athens-based supplier of closures, corks, glass containers, bottling and capping machinery, and technical support for wine, spirits, food, beverage, pharmaceutical, and cosmetics markets. In November, the company acquired Nest-Filler PKG Co., Ltd., a South Korea-based packaging supplier focused on skincare and color cosmetics, including plastic and glass packaging products and sustainable packaging solutions.

In 2024, Berlin Packaging expanded in Ireland and Japan. In January, it acquired Alpack Limited, a Dublin-based family-owned supplier of food packaging products including glass bottles and jars, twist-off caps, cardboard boxes, and eco-friendly containers. In September, the company acquired Nissho Jitsugyo Co Ltd, a Japanese packaging supplier founded in Osaka in 1965 that serves food and beverage, beauty, personal care, and healthcare markets across Japan.

In 2025, Berlin Packaging completed several acquisitions in Europe. In January, it acquired Rixius AG, a Germany-based supplier of rigid packaging for the chemical, pharmaceutical, cosmetics, and food and beverage markets across the DACH and Benelux regions. In June, the company completed the acquisition of Sarom Packaging and Romgallia, Romanian packaging suppliers serving food, beverage, pharmaceutical, and cosmetics customers in Romania and Eastern Europe. In July, it acquired Cosmei, an Italian beauty and cosmetics packaging company headquartered in Bagnolo Cremasco, Italy, with an additional sourcing office in Guangzhou, China. In November, Berlin Packaging acquired Jurcal, a Spanish distributor specializing in packaging for the pharmaceutical and veterinary industries, expanding its presence in Spain.

In 2026, Berlin Packaging continued its global expansion through acquisitions in North America and Europe. In June, the company acquired O.Berk Company, a family-owned supplier of plastic, glass, and metal containers, closures, and value-added packaging solutions headquartered in New Jersey. The acquisition expanded Berlin Packaging's presence in the pharmaceutical, nutraceutical, beauty, and personal care markets in North America.

Also in June 2026, Berlin Packaging acquired BlueSky, a United Kingdom-based supplier of plastic, metal, and glass packaging solutions serving the pharmaceutical, nutraceutical, beauty, personal care, home care, and beverage sectors. The acquisition strengthened Berlin Packaging's position in the UK market and expanded its presence across the Europe, Middle East, and Africa (EMEA) region.

=== Milestones ===
In 1989, the firm established its Global Packaging Group, followed a year later by the formation of E3, a consulting subsidiary. The company announced its Berlin Financial Services subsidiary in 1991 and opened its Studio One Eleven package design and innovation studio in 1999. In 2014, the firm's Quality Division began offering consulting services.

In 2007, Investcorp, a global asset management firm, acquired a majority ownership interest in Berlin Packaging. In 2014, Investcorp sold the corporation to Oak Hill Capital Partners, which acquired a majority stake. The transaction valued Berlin Packaging at $1.43 billion.

== Structure ==
=== Product Lines ===
Berlin Packaging designs, sources, and distributes stock and custom rigid packaging products, including containers, closures, and dispensing systems. Its product portfolio includes plastic, glass, and metal containers such as bottles, jars, cans, pails, and drums, as well as closures and dispensing solutions such as pumps, sprayers, and caps. The company also provides related services including labeling, decoration, and packaging design.

The company serves a range of end markets, including food and beverage, wine and spirits, pharmaceutical, personal care, beauty, home care, and industrial sectors.

== Ownership ==
In October 2014, investment manager Investcorp completed the sale of Berlin Packaging to Oak Hill Capital Partners for $1.43 billion. Oak Hill Capital Partners is the majority owner with a significant minority stake held by Andrew T. Berlin. The executive management team also has ownership in the company.

In November 2021, Oak Hill Capital Partners and CPP Investments led a recapitalization of Berlin Packaging. As part of the transaction, CPP Investments joined as an investor alongside Oak Hill Capital Partners, and the company’s management team made an additional investment.
