= Another Way (album) =

Studio album by Teenage Bottlerocket
- Released: October 31, 2003
- Recorded: June–July 2003
- Studio: Motaland Studios (Denver, Colorado)
- Genre: Punk rock
- Length: 22:15; 33:42
- Label: One Legged Pup

Teenage Bottlerocket chronology
A-Bomb (2002)	Another Way (2003)	Total (2005)

Another Way is the debut studio album by American punk rock/pop punk band Teenage Bottlerocket, released on October 31, 2003. It was released by independent record labels One Legged Pup Records, on 12-inch vinyl format, and Red Scare Industries, on 7-inch and CD format. Later, in 2008, the album was released digitally. In March 2011, a "deluxe edition" of the album, containing tracks from the band's 2002 EP A-bomb and the band's tracks from a split 7-inch with Bill the Welder, was released by Red Scare Industries. Danish rock band Volbeat covered the song "Rebound" on their 2016 album Seal The Deal & Let's Boogie.

== Track listing ==
1. "Be Stag" – 2:12
2. "Patrick" – 0:50
3. "Go-Go" – 1:46
4. "She Can't Think" – 1:28
5. "Senior Prom" – 2:01
6. "Mini Skirt" – 1:48
7. "Pull the Plug" – 2:02
8. "Rebound" – 2:23
9. "Opportunity" – 2:48
10. "Rathead" – 1:33
11. "Another Way" – 3:24

=== Deluxe edition bonus tracks ===
12. "A-Bomb"
13. "Teenwolf"
14. "Going Slow"
15. "Job on Me"
16. "Go Away"
17. "Why I Let You Go"

== Personnel ==
- Ray Carlisle – bass, vocals 1–17
- Joel Pattinson – guitar, backing vocals 1–11, 16–17
- Zach Doe – guitar 12–15
- Brandon Carlisle – drums 1–17
