= Freak Out! (Teenage Bottlerocket album) =

Album

Studio album by Teenage Bottlerocket
- Released: July 3, 2012
- Recorded: February – April 2012
- Studio: The Blasting Room (Fort Collins)
- Genre: Punk rock, pop punk, skate punk
- Length: 29:05
- Label: Fat Wreck Chords
- Producer: Andrew Berlin, Teenage Bottlerocket

Teenage Bottlerocket chronology
Mutilate Me EP (2011)	Freak Out! (2012)	American Deutsch Bag EP (2013)

Freak Out! is the fifth album by Teenage Bottlerocket. It was released on July 3, 2012 on Fat Wreck Chords. The band began work on the album in February 2012 at The Blasting Room with engineer Andrew Berlin, who also co-produced the album with the band, and finished in April.

Two of the songs, "Mutilate Me" and "Punk House of Horror", were previously released on the 2011 "'Mutilate Me" EP. Another song, "Headbanger", was previously recorded by Sack, a band which featured TBR members Kody Templeman, Ray Carlisle and Brandon Carlisle. The band shot a music video for "Headbanger".

== Track listing ==
No.	Title	Length
1.	"Freak Out!"	0:38
2.	"Headbanger"	1:59
3.	"Cruising for Chicks"	2:09
4.	"Necrocomicon"	1:42
5.	"Maverick"	2:19
6.	"Done with Love"	2:53
7.	"Punk House of Horror"	1:36
8.	"Never Gonna Tell You"	2:04
9.	"In the Pit"	2:00
10.	"Mutilate Me"	2:37
11.	"Who Killed Sensei?"	1:38
12.	"Radical"	2:20
13.	"Summertime"	2:34
14.	"Go with the Flow"	2:42

== Credits ==
Teenage Bottlerocket

- Ray Carlisle – Vocals/Guitar
- Kody Templeman – Vocals/Guitar
- Miguel Chen – Bass guitar
- Brandon Carlisle – Drums

Artwork

- Dawn Wilson – Photography

Production

- Andrew Berlin – Producer, engineer, Mastering, mixing
