= Warning Device =

Studio album by Teenage Bottlerocket
- Released: January 8, 2008
- Studio: The Blasting Room (Fort Collins)
- Genre: Punk rock
- Length: 27:51
- Label: Red Scare

Teenage Bottlerocket chronology
Total (2005)	Warning Device (2008)	They Came from the Shadows (2009)

Warning Device is the third studio album by the American pop punk band Teenage Bottlerocket.

== Release ==
It was released on January 8, 2008 on Red Scare Records, their last release for the label. A music video was released for "In the Basement" on February 4, 2008. The following month, the band embarked on a West Coast US tour with Dead to Me, the Femurs and Broadway Calls, which led into an East Coast tour with the Copyrights. In August 2008, the band embarked on a headlining tour of Canada with support from Riptides and the Sidekicks, followed by a handful of US shows. In October 2008, they then appeared at Riot Fest, before going on a short US tour.

== Reception ==
Professional ratings
Review scores
Source	Rating
AllMusic	3.5/5 stars
Punknews.org	7/10

Stewart Mason, in his review for AllMusic, says, "Warning Device is an album strictly for pop-punk purists", calling it "old-school pop-punk done up right, with equal emphasis on the pop side of the hyphen..." Punknews.org ranked the album at number nine on their list of the year's 20 best releases.

== Track listing ==
1. "Bottlerocket" – 0:51
2. "In the Basement" – 1:56
3. "Gave You My Heart" – 2:21
4. "She's Not the One" – 2:08
5. "Pacemaker" – 2:29
6. "Social Life" – 1:58
7. "Welcome to the Nuthouse" – 1:46
8. "Anna's Song" – 2:06
9. "On My Own" – 2:40
10. "Totally Stupid" – 2:18
11. "Crawling Back to You" – 2:26
12. "Warning Device" – 2:29
13. "Wasting Time" – 2:23

=== Vinyl/digital bonus track ===
14. "I Know You Know" – 2:28

== Personnel ==
- Ray Carlisle – guitar, vocals
- Kody Templeman – guitar, vocals
- Miguel Chen – bass
- Brandon Carlisle – drums
