= They Came from the Shadows =

Studio album by Teenage Bottlerocket
- Released: September 15, 2009
- Recorded: May 11–23, 2009
- Studio: The Blasting Room (Fort Collins)
- Genre: Punk rock, pop punk
- Length: 31:34
- Label: Fat Wreck Chords

Teenage Bottlerocket chronology
Warning Device (2008)	They Came from the Shadows (2009)	Mutilate Me (2011)

Professional ratings
Review scores
Source	Rating
PopMatters	(4/10)
ScenePointBlank	(6.5/10)

They Came from the Shadows is the fourth studio album by the American punk rock band Teenage Bottlerocket. It was released on September 15, 2009, on Fat Wreck Chords, their first release for the label. The album was recorded at Blasting Room in May through July 2009. Music videos were made for 'Skate or Die" and "Bigger than KISS."

== Background ==
In February 2009, the band announced that they had signed to Fat Wreck Chords, and were aiming to release a new studio album later in the year. In May 2009, the band recorded their next album at The Blasting Room.

== Release ==
On July 21, 2009, They Came from the Shadows was announced for release in two months' time. Alongside this, the album's track listing and artwork were posted online. On August 5, 2009, "Skate or Die" was posted online, followed by "Don't Want to Go" on September 4, 2009. They Came from the Shadows was made available for streaming on September 6, 2009 through the band's Myspace profile, before being released on September 15, 2009. The following day, a music video was released for "Skate or Die". In October and November 2009, the band went on tour with Cobra Skulls; both bands continued on the West Coast with the Lawrence Arms. On January 18, 2010, a music video was released for "Bigger Than Kiss". In April and May 2010, the band went on a US tour with NOFX and No Use for a Name frontman Tony Sly, and performed at the Punk Rock Bowling Tournament festival. Following appearances at Insubordination Fest and Interpunk American Skate Fest, they went on a West Coast tour with Banner Pilot in July 2010. In August 2010, the band went on an East Coast and Midwest tour with the Mighty Mighty Bosstones and the Flatliners. They supported labelmates Me First and the Gimme Gimmes on their short East Coast tour in October 2010.

== Track listing ==
No.	Title	Length
1.	"Skate or Die"	1:50
2.	"Don’t Want to Go"	1:51
3.	"Bigger than Kiss"	2:02
4.	"Do What?"	2:27
5.	"Not OK"	3:17
6.	"Forbidden Planet"	2:20
7.	"Call in Sick"	2:13
8.	"Fatso Goes Nutzoid"	1:39
9.	"Without You"	2:11
10.	"Tonguebiter"	2:05
11.	"Be with You"	1:43
12.	"The Jerk"	2:10
13.	"They Came from the Shadows"	2:17
14.	"Todayo"	3:29

== Personnel ==
- Ray Carlisle – guitar, vocals
- Kody Templeman – guitar, vocals
- Miguel Chen – bass
- Brandon Carlisle – drums
