= Stealing The Covers =

Studio album by Teenage Bottlerocket
- Released: July 14, 2017
- Recorded: March 5–13, 2017
- Studio: The Blasting Room (Fort Collins)
- Genre: Punk rock, pop-punk
- Length: 26:19
- Label: Fat Wreck Chords

Teenage Bottlerocket chronology
Tales from Wyoming (2015)	Stealing The Covers (2017)	Stay Rad! (2019)

Professional ratings
Review scores
Source	Rating
Punknews.org	3.5/5 stars
Ramzine	3/5 stars

Stealing The Covers is the seventh studio album by the punk band Teenage Bottlerocket. The album consists of cover versions of songs originally recorded by small, not very well known and often short-lived bands. Stealing The Covers was released by Fat Wreck Chords on CD and LP on July 14, 2017.

== Track listing ==
No.	Title	Length
1.	"The Way I Know" (Varsity Weirdos)	1:51
2.	"Back And Forth" (Hollywood Blondes)	3:01
3.	"College Town" (Jüke)	2:16
4.	"Don't Go" (The Scutches)	2:30
5.	"Robocop Is A Halfbreed Sellout" (Sprocket Nova)	2:33
6.	"No Hugging No Learning" (Head)	1:09
7.	"Shit Fuck God Damn" (Artimus Maximus)	0:35
8.	"Gay Parade" (The Gullibles)	2:03
9.	"It Came From The Radio" (The Blendours)	2:00
10.	"Alien Motion Technology" (The Mugwumps)	1:42
11.	"Hat Nerd" (The Four Eyes)	1:59
12.	"My Very Best" (The 20Belows)	1:52
13.	"I Kill Butterflies" (Onion Flavored Rings)	1:18
14.	"Why The Big Pause" (The Punchlines)	1:30

== Performers ==
- Miguel Chen – bass
- Darren Chewka – drums
- Ray Carlisle – guitar, vocals
- Kody Templeman – guitar, vocals
