= Continental Packaging Solutions =

American packaging company

- Company type: Private
- Industry: Packaging
- Founded: 1936
- Headquarters: Chicago, Illinois, US
- Products: Plastic and metal containers, Packaging
- Website: www.berlinpackaging.com

Continental Packaging Solutions was an American packaging company. It was founded in 1936 and headquartered in Chicago, Illinois, until Berlin Packaging purchased the company in 2010. The company was a member of the National Association of Container Distributors (NACD).

== History ==
In 1936, Nathan Rosenstone, along with William Blitzstein, Harold Fishbein, and Morris Allentuck founded Continental Glass Company, which began operations with office space and a warehouse at 524 W. Erie Street in Chicago. In 1937 the company moved to 841 W. Cermak Road, and in 2005 to 230 W. Monroe Street.

== Clients ==
The core of the business was supplying glass bottles to the beverage industry from Glenshaw Glass to companies such as Pepsi-Cola, 7-Up, Dr Pepper, and a group of small beverage manufacturers. At that time there were also a number of small rectifiers in Chicago. A major customer from this group was the Jim Beam Distillery Company. Another major customer at that time was The Real Lemon Co. These companies, along with the beverage manufacturers, represented the core of Continental’s business.

Continental soon found footholds not only in the beverage and liquor industry, but in other areas such as health and beauty, including industry pioneer Helene Curtis. Customers included Abbott Laboratories, Kraft Foods, Baxter Laboratories, and Steffen Vinegar. Continental’s influence grew after it was awarded the exclusive distributorship of Owens-Illinois products for its region.

== Acquisition ==
In 2010, Continental Packaging Solutions was acquired and integrated into Berlin Packaging, a North American supplier of packaging.
