= Teenage Bottlerocket =

American pop punk band

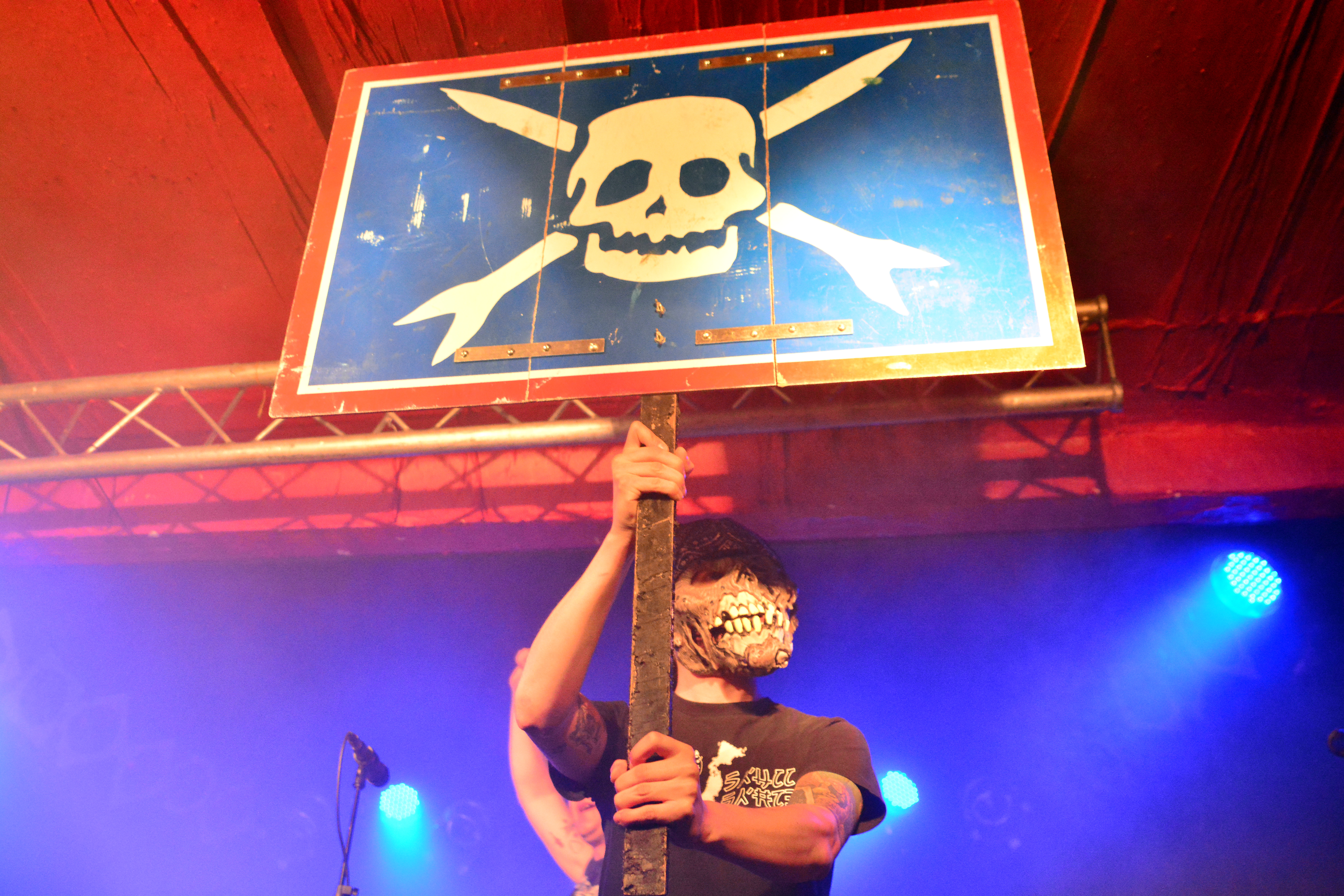
- Teenage Bottlerocket at the Pirate Satellite Festival 2015 in the Hamburg market hall

Background information
- Origin: Laramie, Wyoming, United States
- Genres: Punk rock; skate punk; pop punk
- Years active: 2000–present
- Labels: Pirates Press, Rise, Fat Wreck Chords, Red Scare, One Legged Pup, Adeline
- Members: Ray Carlisle; Kody Templeman; Miguel Chen; Darren Chewka
- Past members: Brandon Carlisle; Zach Doe; Joel Pattinson
- Website: teenagebottlerocket.com

Teenage Bottlerocket is an American rock band formed in Laramie, Wyoming in 2000. The rock band was formed by twin brothers Ray and Brandon Carlisle, following the dissolution of their previous band, Homeless Wonders. The band's music is heavily influenced by guitarist and co-vocalist Kody Templeman's other band, The Lillingtons, and punk rock acts such as Ramones, Screeching Weasel, Green Day, The Bouncing Souls, and Misfits; Their music has been referred to as "Ramones-core", "Weasel-core" and "leather jacket punk".

In a 2006 interview with the band, Punknews described Teenage Bottlerocket as "the last decent band around playing Ramones-y pop punk", stating that Teenage Bottlerocket "certainly owe[s] nothing to the trends" and naming the band "the best punk band from the Cowboy State since The Lillingtons".

On November 3, 2015, Brandon Carlisle was found unresponsive in his Fort Collins home by his roommate. On November 7, the remaining band members confirmed via Twitter that Carlisle had died in his sleep the night before, after being taken off life support.

== History ==
=== Formation and early releases (2000–2004) ===
Originally consisting of Ray Carlisle (on vocals and bass guitar), Brandon Carlisle (on drums), and Zach Doe (on guitar), the band released its debut EP, A Bomb (sometimes spelled A-Bomb), on a Laramie communal label, One Legged Pup, and distributed through Lost Cat Records, in 2002. Soon after, Doe left and went back to Chicago, Illinois, leaving the twins without a guitarist until they found University of Wyoming Music Major Joel Pattinson. In 2003, the band members wrote and recorded their first full-length LP Another Way, also released on One Legged Pup. The release was vinyl only (the first 500 on pink vinyl), released on Halloween night 2003. The band continued to play and promote numerous local shows, even landing some opening spots in Laramie with All and The Ataris. The band was to embark on a short summer tour of the midwest in 2004. When Pattinson could not make the trip due to his obligations to the University Orchestra, the Carlisles called up their old friend Kody Templeman (lead singer in The Lillingtons) to play guitar on the tour. The tour went well, and the band ended up playing some of the new songs that Kody had written. By the end of the tour, he was a permanent member of the band, although he has continued living in his hometown of Newcastle, 246 miles away from the rest of the band.

=== Total, touring, and Warning Device (2004–2007) ===
In late 2004 and early 2005, the band recorded its Red Scare debut full length, Total, which contains dual vocals from Ray and Kody. It was released on April 12, 2005. After Total was released, the Groovie Ghoulies took notice of the band, and offered the group a spot on the Space Station stage at the Vans Warped Tour. Soon after, the Ghoulies decided to drop Warped Tour, and embark with Bottlerocket, and The Teenage Harlets on the Teen Kicks Tour 2005. The band would go on to play shows with The Methadones, Chixdiggit, and The Mr. T Experience. In late 2005 and early 2006 the group embarked on its European Vacation Tour. In mid-2006, Bottlerocket embarked on another nationwide tour, this time with Fat Wreck Chords new wave act, the Epoxies. Also in 2006, Ray moved over to second guitar when Miguel Chen joined on as bassist.

On December 28, 2007, the band filmed its first music video, for the song "In the Basement" from the new album Warning Device. The album released on January 8, 2008, by Red Scare Industries.

=== They Came From The Shadows, Another Way, Mutilate Me, and Freak Out! (2008–2013) ===
On February 10, 2009, Teenage Bottlerocket was signed to Fat Wreck Chords. The group's first album for the label, titled They Came from the Shadows, was released on September 15, 2009. The group followed up the release with tours with NOFX, the Mighty Mighty Bosstones, and Me First and the Gimme Gimmes.

Two releases came in 2011. In March, Red Scare released the band's first album, Another Way, on CD for the first time in a deluxe edition with other previous vinyl-only tracks. In April, Fat Wreck Chords released an EP, Mutilate Me, the group's second release on Fat Wreck which includes a Bad Religion cover. In 2012, the band released its fifth studio album, Freak Out!, again on Fat Wreck Chords. and in 2013 after a long euro tour with Danish metal band Volbeat, and Florida band Iced Earth, the band released a German themed EP named 'American Deutsch Bag'. Volbeat covered the band's song "Rebound" on their album Seal the Deal & Let's Boogie (2016).

In June 2014, the band members announced that the group had signed with Rise Records. In 2015, the band released Tales From Wyoming on Rise Records with two singles including "Haunted House" and "They Call Me Steve".

=== Brandon Carlisle's death, Stealing the Covers, Goin' Back to Wyo, Stay Rad!, and Sick Sesh! (2015–2021) ===
On November 3, 2015, drummer Brandon Carlisle was found unresponsive in his Fort Collins home by his roommate. On November 7, the band's Twitter page confirmed he had died in his sleep the night before after being taken off life support.

On January 18, 2016, it was announced that Darren Chewka, of Canadian band The Old Wives, would become Teenage Bottlerocket's new drummer. The band returned to Fat Wreck Chords in 2017, releasing Stealing the Covers, a full-length album consisting entirely of cover songs by obscure bands. A 7-inch single, Goin' Back to Wyo', was released in conjunction with the album, and consisted of two new original songs. It was released on July 14, 2017.

In early 2019 the band announced the release of their first new studio album since Brandon's death, Stay Rad!, which released on Fat Wreck Chords on March 15, 2019. Two singles were released for the album along with accompanying music videos; "I Wanna Be a Dog" on Aug 22, 2019 and "Everything to Me" on Feb 21, 2019.

On June 14, 2021, the band announced a music video for their new song "Ghost Story" which was released on June 17. On the release date of the video they also announced their new upcoming album Sick Sesh! to be released on August 27, 2021, on Fat Wreck Chords. Another single, "Never Sing Along", was released on July 26, 2021. In support of the album, the band went on tour from June to November that year with The Last Gang and Broadway Calls.

=== Pirates Press Records and Ready to Roll (2025-present) ===
On April 18, 2025, the band announced their official signing to Pirates Press Records, and their tenth studio album, Ready to Roll, released on September 12 on the same year. 2025 also saw the release of a 4-track EP, Mission to Shred. The band's newest material is the EP The Invisible Man, released 06 March 2026.

== Band members ==
Current members

- Ray Carlisle – vocals, guitar (2006–present); lead vocals, bass (2000–2006)
- Kody Templeman – guitar, vocals (2004–present)
- Miguel Chen – bass, backing vocals (2006–present)
- Darren Chewka – drums, backing vocals (2016–present)

Former members

- Brandon Carlisle – drums, backing vocals (2000–2015; died 2015)
- Zach Doe – guitar (2000–2002)
- Joel Pattinson – guitar, backing vocals (2002–2006)

Timeline

== Discography ==
=== Studio albums ===
- Another Way (2003)
- Total (2005)
- Warning Device (2008)
- They Came from the Shadows (2009)
- Freak Out! (2012)
- Tales from Wyoming (2015)
- Stealing the Covers (2017)
- Stay Rad! (2019)
- Sick Sesh! (2021)
- Ready to Roll (2025)

== Music videos ==
- "In the Basement" (2007)
- "Skate or Die" (2009)
- "Bigger Than Kiss" (2009)
- "She's Not The One" (2011)
- "Headbanger" (2012)
- "Cruising for Chicks" (2012)
- "Freak Out" (2013)
- "Haunted House" (2015)
- "They Call Me Steve" (2015)
- "Dead Saturday" (2015)
- "Why the Big Pause" (2017)
- "Everything to Me" (2019)
- "I Wanna Be a Dog" (2019)
- "Ghost Story" (2021)
- "You're Never Going Out of Style" (2021)
- "Strung Out on Stress" (2021)
- "Never Sing Along" (2021)
- "Semi Truck" (2021)
