= Derrick Van Dusen =

- Pitcher
- Born: June 6, 1981; Fontana, California, U.S.
- Bats: Left Throws: Left
- Stats at Baseball Reference

Derrick Curtis Van Dusen (born June 6, 1981) is an American former professional baseball pitcher.

== Professional career ==
Van Dusen was selected by the Seattle Mariners in the 5th round of the 2000 Major League Baseball draft out of Riverside Community College. Van Dusen played eight seasons of professional baseball in the Seattle Mariners, Texas Rangers, Cleveland Indians, and Pittsburgh Pirates organizations, as well as stints in the Puerto Rico Baseball League, CPBL, and American Association. Van Dusen is now a scout with the Pittsburgh Pirates.
