= Tales from Wyoming =

Tales From Wyoming

Studio album by Teenage Bottlerocket
- Released: March 31, 2015
- Recorded: December 2014 – January 2015
- Studio: The Blasting Room (Fort Collins)
- Genre: Punk rock, pop-punk
- Length: 35:28
- Label: Rise Records
- Producer: Bill Stevenson, Jason Livermore

Teenage Bottlerocket chronology
| American Deutsch Bag (2013) | Tales From Wyoming (2015) | Stealing The Covers (2017) |

Professional ratings
Review scores
| Source | Rating |
|---|---|
| Punknews.org | 4/5 stars |
| Exclaim! | 6/10 stars |

Tales From Wyoming is the sixth studio album by American punk rock band Teenage Bottlerocket, released on March 31, 2015 through Rise Records. The album was recorded, mixed, and mastered at The Blasting Room, a studio the band frequently works with.

Tales from Wyoming is the final album with drummer Brandon Carlisle, as he died on November 7, 2015.

== Track listing ==
All tracks are written by Teenage Bottlerocket.

| No. | Title | Length |
|---|---|---|
| 1. | "In My Head" | 1:34 |
| 2. | "I Found The One" | 2:17 |
| 3. | "Nothing Else Matters (When I'm With You)" | 3:19 |
| 4. | "They Call Me Steve" | 2:20 |
| 5. | "Dead Saturday" | 2:35 |
| 6. | "Cockroach Strikes Again" | 3:58 |
| 7. | "Been Too Long" | 3:12 |
| 8. | "Too much La Collina" | 2:08 |
| 9. | "Can't Quit You" | 2:22 |
| 10. | "Haunted House" | 2:32 |
| 11. | "Bullshit" | 1:31 |
| 12. | "I Wanna Die" | 1:55 |
| 13. | "TV Set" | 2:09 |
| 14. | "First Time" | 3:36 |

== Personnel ==
=== Teenage Bottlerocket ===
- Ray Carlisle – lead vocals, guitar
- Kody Templeman – guitar, lead vocals
- Miguel Chen – bass, backing vocals
- Brandon Carlisle – drums, backing vocals

=== Additional musicians ===
- Sarah Swiatek – cello on "First Time"

=== Production ===
- Jason Livermore – mixing, mastering, production, engineering
- Bill Stevenson – production, engineering
- Chris Beeble – engineering
- Andrew Berlin – engineering

=== Artwork ===
- Dawn Wilson – photography
- Sergie Loobkoff – album cover
- Chris Shary – artwork
