= Bruni Glass =

Berlin Packaging | Bruni Glass
- Company type: Private
- Industry: Glass
- Founded: 1974
- Headquarters: Milan, Italy
- Website: berlinpackaging.eu

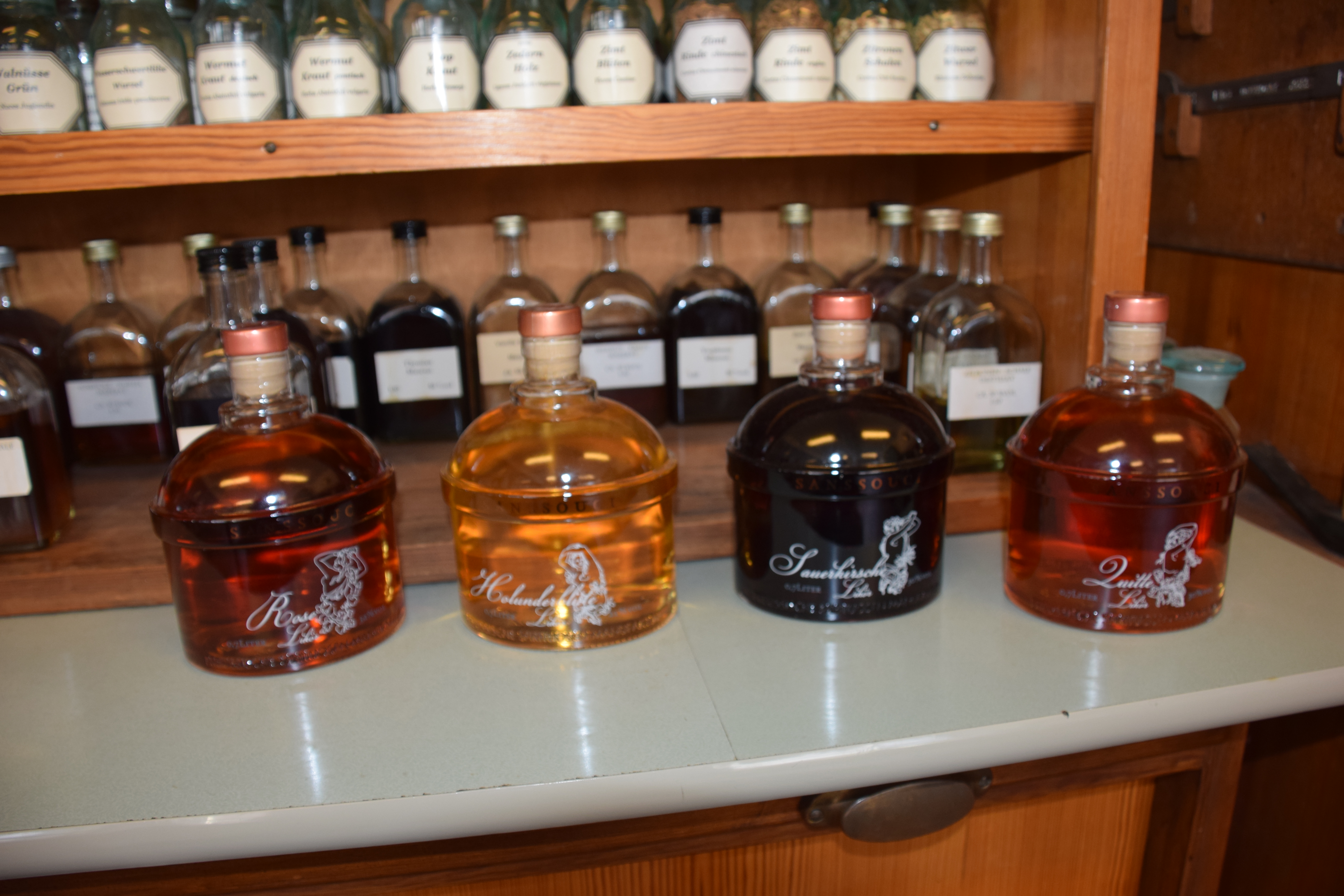
Sanssouci-Liköre in Bruni Glass bottles

Bruni Glass is a private commercial brand under the umbrella of Berlin Packaging, which provides specialty glass packaging for wine, spirit, food and gourmet markets.

Founded in Milan, Italy in 1974 as Vetrerie Bruni S.r.l., Bruni Glass is active in the distribution of glass containers for more than 100 countries. Bruni Glass was acquired by Berlin Packaging in 2016.
