= Armando Gabino =

Dominican baseball player (born 1983)

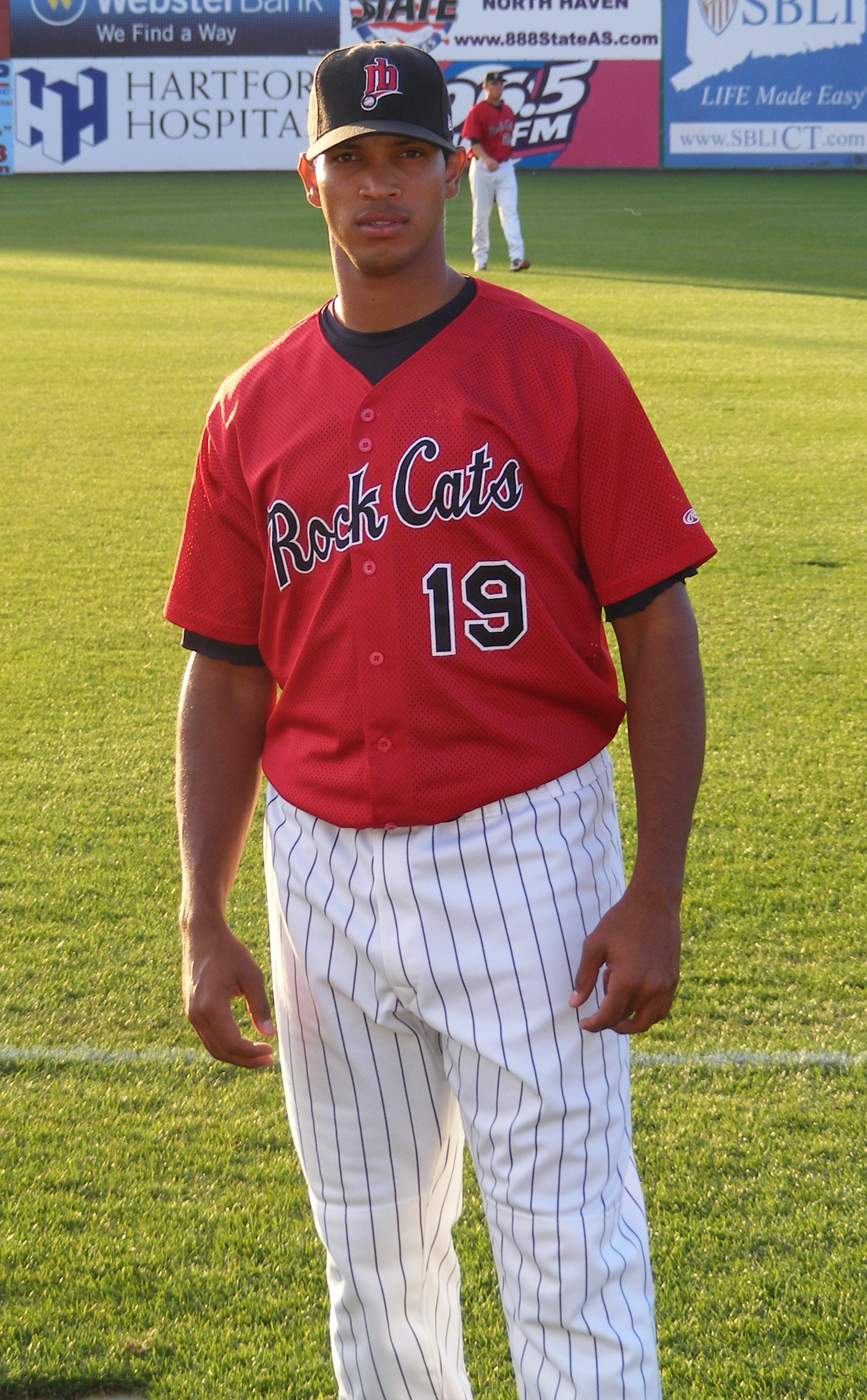
- Gabino with the New Britain Rock Cats in 2008
- Pitcher
- Born: August 31, 1983 (age 42); Santiago, Dominican Republic
- Batted: Right Threw: Right

MLB debut
- August 25, 2009, for the Minnesota Twins

Last MLB appearance
- August 26, 2010, for the Baltimore Orioles

MLB statistics
- Win–loss record: 0–0
- Earned run average: 15.12
- Strikeouts: 4
- Stats at Baseball Reference

Teams
- Minnesota Twins (2009); Baltimore Orioles (2010)

Armando Leisdeker Gabino (born August 31, 1983) is a Dominican former professional baseball pitcher who played in Major League Baseball (MLB) for the Minnesota Twins and Baltimore Orioles. He is the current pitching coach for the Dominican Summer League Cubs.

== Playing career ==
=== Cleveland Indians ===
Gabino was originally signed by the Cleveland Indians on April 19, 2001. He started his career as a third baseman, but the Indians converted him into a pitcher in 2004.

=== Minnesota Twins ===
After the 2004 season, the Minnesota Twins drafted him in the 2004 Rule 5 draft.

Gabino got off to a dreadful start with the Twins, posting an 8.10 ERA with the rookie league Elizabethton Twins. Next year, however, he improved and move up to Single-A. After continued success in the minors, the Twins called up Gabino on August 21, 2009. However, he did not pitch well and was subsequently returned to the minors.

=== Baltimore Orioles ===
The Baltimore Orioles claimed him on waivers after the season. Shortly after signing with the Orioles, on February 9, 2010, he was designated for assignment. He cleared waivers and was sent to the Norfolk Tides, the Orioles triple-A affiliate. However, after stellar pitching in Norfolk, the Orioles called him up on August 5 to replace the injured David Hernandez. Once again, however, he failed to pitch well, and he was sent down on August 28 as the Orioles activated pitcher Jim Johnson from the disabled list. On November 24, Gabino was removed from the 40-man roster and sent outright to Triple-A Norfolk.

== Coaching career ==
Gabino was named as the pitching coach for the Eugene Emeralds of the Chicago Cubs organization for the 2019 season. On February 18, 2026, Gabino was announced as a pitching coach for the Dominican Summer League Cubs.

== See also ==
- Rule 5 draft results
