= Lin Po-chun =

Taiwanese baseball player (born 2006)

Seattle Mariners
- Relief pitcher
- Born: 21 July 2006 (age 19); Taipei, Taiwan
- Bats: Left Throws: Right
- Stats at Baseball Reference
Medals
Representing Chinese Taipei
Men's baseball
U-18 Baseball World Cup
Silver medal – second place	2022 United States	Team
Silver medal – second place	2023 Taiwan	Team
U-18 Asian Baseball Championship
Gold medal – first place	2024 Taiwan	Team

Lin Po-chun
- Chinese: 林鉑濬
Transcriptions
Standard Mandarin
- Wade–Giles: Lin^{2} Po^{2}-Chun^{4}

Lin Po-chun (Chinese: 林鉑濬; born 21 July 2006) is a Taiwanese professional baseball pitcher in the Seattle Mariners organization.

== Early life ==
Lin attended Yingge Vocational High School in New Taipei and graduated in 2024. According to the Yingge head coach, Lin's primary position was catcher, but as his fastball reached 150 kilometers per hour (93.2 miles per hour), he became primarily a pitcher his senior year. Lin played a game as the starting catcher in the 2023 Black Panther Banner high school tournament.

For three years in a row, Lin was selected to play for the Chinese Taipei national under-18 team. He pitched in the 2022 U-18 Baseball World Cup in Florida, 2023 U-18 Baseball World Cup in Taiwan, and 2024 U-18 Asian Baseball Championship.

In 2024, Lin threw a 154 km/h (95.7 mph) fastball against South Korea at the U-18 Asian championship. He earned the final win when the Taiwanese team defeated Japan in the final. Lin pitched 8 innings in the tournament without giving up any runs, including 4 1/3 innings in the championship game. He was named the tournament MVP.

== Professional career ==
In May 2024, it was reported that an American League West team of Major League Baseball was interested in Lin. Hen was ranked No. 94 on Baseball America's top 100 international prospects list in January 2025. Later that month, that publication said the Seattle Mariners were planning to sign Lin. In February, Lin's contract was valued at $550,000. Lin did not pitch professionally in 2025.

== Pitching style ==
Lin throws a fastball into the mid-90s and pairs it with a split-finger fastball.
