= Andrew T. Berlin =

American businessman, attorney, and philanthropist

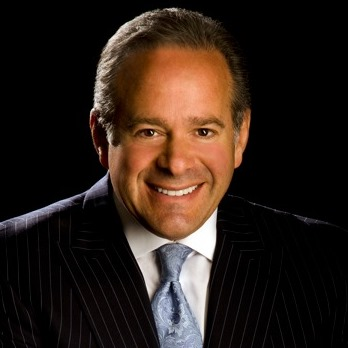
- Born: June 30, 1960 (age 66); Chicago, Illinois, U.S.
- Occupation: Businessman
- Known for: Chairman of Berlin Packaging; Part-owner of the Chicago Cubs

Andrew T. Berlin (born June 30, 1960) is an American businessman, attorney, and philanthropist living in Chicago, Illinois.

Berlin was the chairman and chief executive officer of Berlin Packaging, a global supplier of plastic, glass and metal containers and closures with 2017 sales in excess of $1.3 billion and a valuation of $2.6 billion. In October 2014, the company was valued at $1.4 billion. His management of Berlin Packaging has been used as a case study in The Human Equation by Jeffrey Pfeffer.

He is a partner and shareholder of the Chicago Cubs Major League Baseball team and chairman and owner of the South Bend Cubs, a Minor League Baseball team affiliated with the Chicago Cubs.

In June 2021, Berlin joined Shield.AI as Executive Chairman.

== Personal background ==
Berlin was born in Chicago, Illinois. He attended New Trier High School and graduated from Lake Forest Academy. Berlin earned his Bachelor of Arts degree in political science from Syracuse University, followed by a J.D. degree from Loyola University Chicago School of Law in 1986. At Loyola, Berlin served as managing editor of the Law Review.

== Professional background ==
In 1988, Berlin resigned from his job at Chicago-based law firm Katten Muchin & Zavis and joined his father in a business venture to purchase Alco Packaging, later renamed Berlin Packaging, an international packaging supplier of plastic, glass, metal containers and closures. At the time, the company had $69 million in annual sales.

In November 2011, Berlin announced he had reached an agreement to purchase the South Bend Silver Hawks. He signed a 20-year cumulative lease agreement with the city of South Bend for the use of Stanley Coveleski Regional Stadium. The sale was approved by the Midwest League, Minor League and Major League Baseball and the Office of the Commissioner of Major League Baseball in early January 2012. On January 12, 2012, the financial and legal transactions were completed, and Berlin became the sole owner of the South Bend Silver Hawks.

In September 2014, the team ended a 17-year affiliation with the Arizona Diamondbacks and signed a four-year player development agreement with the Chicago Cubs. The team changed its name to the South Bend Cubs. The player-development agreement was subsequently extended through the 2020 season.

In 2015, the South Bend Cubs won the John H. Johnson President's Award, which is the highest honor a franchise can receive in Minor League Baseball. Ballpark Digest named the South Bend Cubs its Team of the Year in 2015. Each season under Berlin's ownership has seen a new attendance record set.

In June 2021, Berlin joined Shield.AI as Executive Chairman where he ensures the company meets a series of ambitious short-term and longer-term business goals and objectives including the advancement of overall company growth.

Berlin is a significant investor in the Chicago Cubs.

Berlin has served on boards of directors, including Hawk Corporation, Channel Products, and Image Skincare.

== Philanthropy & Community ==
Berlin serves on the board of trustees at Syracuse University. He serves on the advisory board of the Maxwell School of Citizenship and Public Affairs at Syracuse University.

In 2017, Berlin was appointed by Illinois Governor Bruce Rauner to the Illinois State Police Merit Board, which is responsible for selecting, promoting, and disciplining Illinois State Police troopers.

In 2010, Berlin helped finance the ongoing teaching and research of issues relating to national security at the Institute for National Security and Counterterrorism (INSCT) at Syracuse University's Maxwell School of Citizenship and Public Affairs. The endowment gift was made by the Andrew Berlin Family National Security Research Fund.

Berlin is one of three commissioners on the Glencoe, Illinois, Public Safety Commission, a body which recruits, promotes, and disciplines, along with the director of public safety, all of Glencoe's police, fire and EMT professionals.

Berlin started the Glencoe School Safety Project with the goal to add school resource officers to enhance safety at Glencoe, Illinois, schools. The Glencoe School Board also created a Safety and Security Committee at Berlin's request.

Berlin was involved in raising money for the Illinois State Police Memorial. As part of this, he funded a film to honor Illinois state troopers who died in the line of duty since 1922. The film won a 2015 Emmy Award for Outstanding Achievement in Public Affairs/Current Affairs Programming.

Berlin has served on the boards of directors for several nonprofit organizations, including the American Cancer Society, Starlight Children's Foundation Midwest and A Silver Lining Foundation.

Berlin donates to many organizations, including the NorthShore University HealthSystem Foundation, the Maxwell School of Syracuse University, and the National Baseball Hall of Fame and Museum.
