= 1973 in baseball =

The following are the baseball events of the year 1973 throughout the world.

== Champions ==
=== Major League Baseball ===
- World Series: Oakland Athletics over New York Mets (4–3); Reggie Jackson, MVP

League Championship Series (ALCS, NLCS)
East | Baltimore | 2
West | Oakland | 3
East | NY Mets | 3
West | Cincinnati | 2

World Series
AL | Oakland | 4
NL | NY Mets | 3

- All-Star Game, July 24 at Royals Stadium: National League, 7–1; Bobby Bonds, MVP

=== Other champions ===
- College World Series: USC
- Japan Series: Yomiuri Giants over Nankai Hawks (4–1)
- Big League World Series: Lincolnwood, Illinois
- Little League World Series: Tainan City, Taiwan
- Senior League World Series: Taipei, Taiwan

Winter Leagues

- 1973 Caribbean Series: Tigres del Licey
- Dominican Republic League: Tigres del Licey
- Mexican Pacific League: Yaquis de Obregón
- Puerto Rican League: Cangrejeros de Santurce
- Venezuelan League: Leones del Caracas

== Awards and honors ==
- Baseball Hall of Fame
  - Roberto Clemente
  - Monte Irvin
  - George Kelly
  - Warren Spahn
  - Mickey Welch
  - Billy Evans (umpire)

Baseball Writers' Association of America Awards
| BBWAA Award | National League | American League |
|---|---|---|
| Rookie of the Year | Gary Matthews (SF) | Al Bumbry (BAL) |
| Cy Young Award | Tom Seaver (NYM) | Jim Palmer (BAL) |
| Most Valuable Player | Pete Rose (CIN) | Reggie Jackson (OAK) |
| Babe Ruth Award (World Series MVP) | — | Bert Campaneris (OAK) |
Gold Glove Awards
| Position | National League | American League |
| Pitcher | Bob Gibson (STL) | Jim Kaat (CWS/MIN) |
| Catcher | Johnny Bench (CIN) | Thurman Munson (NYY) |
| 1st Base | Mike Jorgensen (MON) | George Scott (MIL) |
| 2nd Base | Joe Morgan (CIN) | Bobby Grich (BAL) |
| 3rd Base | Doug Rader (HOU) | Brooks Robinson (BAL) |
| Shortstop | Roger Metzger (HOU) | Mark Belanger (BAL) |
| Outfield | Bobby Bonds (SF) | Paul Blair (BAL) |
| Outfield | César Cedeño (HOU) | Amos Otis (KC) |
| Outfield | Willie Davis (LAD) | Mickey Stanley (DET) |

== Statistical leaders ==
| | American League | | National League | |
| Stat | Player | Total | Player | Total |
|---|---|---|---|---|
| AVG | Rod Carew (MIN) | .350 | Pete Rose (CIN) | .338 |
| HR | Reggie Jackson (OAK) | 32 | Willie Stargell (PIT) | 44 |
| RBI | Reggie Jackson (OAK) | 117 | Willie Stargell (PIT) | 119 |
| W | Wilbur Wood (CWS) | 24 | Ron Bryant (SF) | 24 |
| ERA | Jim Palmer (BAL) | 2.40 | Tom Seaver (NYM) | 2.08 |
| K | Nolan Ryan^{1} (CAL) | 383 | Tom Seaver (NYM) | 251 |

^{1} Modern (1901–present) single-season strikeout record

== Major league baseball final standings ==
=== American League final standings ===
AL East
| Team | W | L | Pct. | GB | Home | Road |
|---|---|---|---|---|---|---|
| ^{(1)} Baltimore Orioles | 97 | 65 | .599 | — | 50‍–‍31 | 47‍–‍34 |
| Boston Red Sox | 89 | 73 | .549 | 8 | 48‍–‍33 | 41‍–‍40 |
| Detroit Tigers | 85 | 77 | .525 | 12 | 47‍–‍34 | 38‍–‍43 |
| New York Yankees | 80 | 82 | .494 | 17 | 50‍–‍31 | 30‍–‍51 |
| Milwaukee Brewers | 74 | 88 | .457 | 23 | 40‍–‍41 | 34‍–‍47 |
| Cleveland Indians | 71 | 91 | .438 | 26 | 34‍–‍47 | 37‍–‍44 |

AL West
| Team | W | L | Pct. | GB | Home | Road |
|---|---|---|---|---|---|---|
| ^{(2)} Oakland Athletics | 94 | 68 | .580 | — | 50‍–‍31 | 44‍–‍37 |
| Kansas City Royals | 88 | 74 | .543 | 6 | 48‍–‍33 | 40‍–‍41 |
| Minnesota Twins | 81 | 81 | .500 | 13 | 37‍–‍44 | 44‍–‍37 |
| California Angels | 79 | 83 | .488 | 15 | 43‍–‍38 | 36‍–‍45 |
| Chicago White Sox | 77 | 85 | .475 | 17 | 40‍–‍41 | 37‍–‍44 |
| Texas Rangers | 57 | 105 | .352 | 37 | 35‍–‍46 | 22‍–‍59 |

Locations of teams for the 1973 American League season
West East

=== National League final standings ===
NL East
| Team | W | L | Pct. | GB | Home | Road |
|---|---|---|---|---|---|---|
| ^{(2)} New York Mets | 82 | 79 | .509 | — | 43‍–‍38 | 39‍–‍41 |
| St. Louis Cardinals | 81 | 81 | .500 | 1½ | 43‍–‍38 | 38‍–‍43 |
| Pittsburgh Pirates | 80 | 82 | .494 | 2½ | 41‍–‍40 | 39‍–‍42 |
| Montreal Expos | 79 | 83 | .488 | 3½ | 43‍–‍38 | 36‍–‍45 |
| Chicago Cubs | 77 | 84 | .478 | 5 | 41‍–‍39 | 36‍–‍45 |
| Philadelphia Phillies | 71 | 91 | .438 | 11½ | 38‍–‍43 | 33‍–‍48 |

NL West
| Team | W | L | Pct. | GB | Home | Road |
|---|---|---|---|---|---|---|
| ^{(1)} Cincinnati Reds | 99 | 63 | .611 | — | 50‍–‍31 | 49‍–‍32 |
| Los Angeles Dodgers | 95 | 66 | .590 | 3½ | 50‍–‍31 | 45‍–‍35 |
| San Francisco Giants | 88 | 74 | .543 | 11 | 47‍–‍34 | 41‍–‍40 |
| Houston Astros | 82 | 80 | .506 | 17 | 41‍–‍40 | 41‍–‍40 |
| Atlanta Braves | 76 | 85 | .472 | 22½ | 40‍–‍40 | 36‍–‍45 |
| San Diego Padres | 60 | 102 | .370 | 39 | 31‍–‍50 | 29‍–‍52 |

Locations of teams for the 1971–1976 National League seasons
West East

== Nippon Professional Baseball final standings ==
=== Central League final standings ===
Central League
| Pos | Team | G | W | L | T | Pct. | GB |
|---|---|---|---|---|---|---|---|
| 1 | Yomiuri Giants | 130 | 66 | 60 | 4 | .524 | — |
| 2 | Hanshin Tigers | 130 | 64 | 59 | 7 | .520 | 0.5 |
| 3 | Chunichi Dragons | 130 | 64 | 61 | 5 | .512 | 1.5 |
| 4 | Yakult Atoms | 130 | 62 | 65 | 3 | .488 | 4.5 |
| 5 | Taiyo Whales | 130 | 60 | 64 | 6 | .484 | 5.0 |
| 6 | Hiroshima Toyo Carp | 130 | 60 | 67 | 3 | .472 | 6.5 |

=== Pacific League final standings ===
Pacific League
| Pos | Team | G | W | L | T | Pct. | 1st half rank | 2nd half rank |
|---|---|---|---|---|---|---|---|---|
| 1st half winner | Nankai Hawks | 130 | 68 | 58 | 4 | .540 | 1 | 3 |
| 2nd half winner | Hankyu Braves | 130 | 77 | 48 | 5 | .616 | 3 | 1 |
| 3 | Lotte Orions | 130 | 70 | 49 | 11 | .588 | 2 | 2 |
| 4 | Taiheiyo Club Lions | 130 | 59 | 64 | 7 | .480 | 4 | 5 |
| 5 | Nittaku Home Flyers | 130 | 55 | 69 | 6 | .444 | 5 | 3 |
| 6 | Kintetsu Buffaloes | 130 | 42 | 83 | 5 | .336 | 6 | 6 |

== Events ==
=== January ===
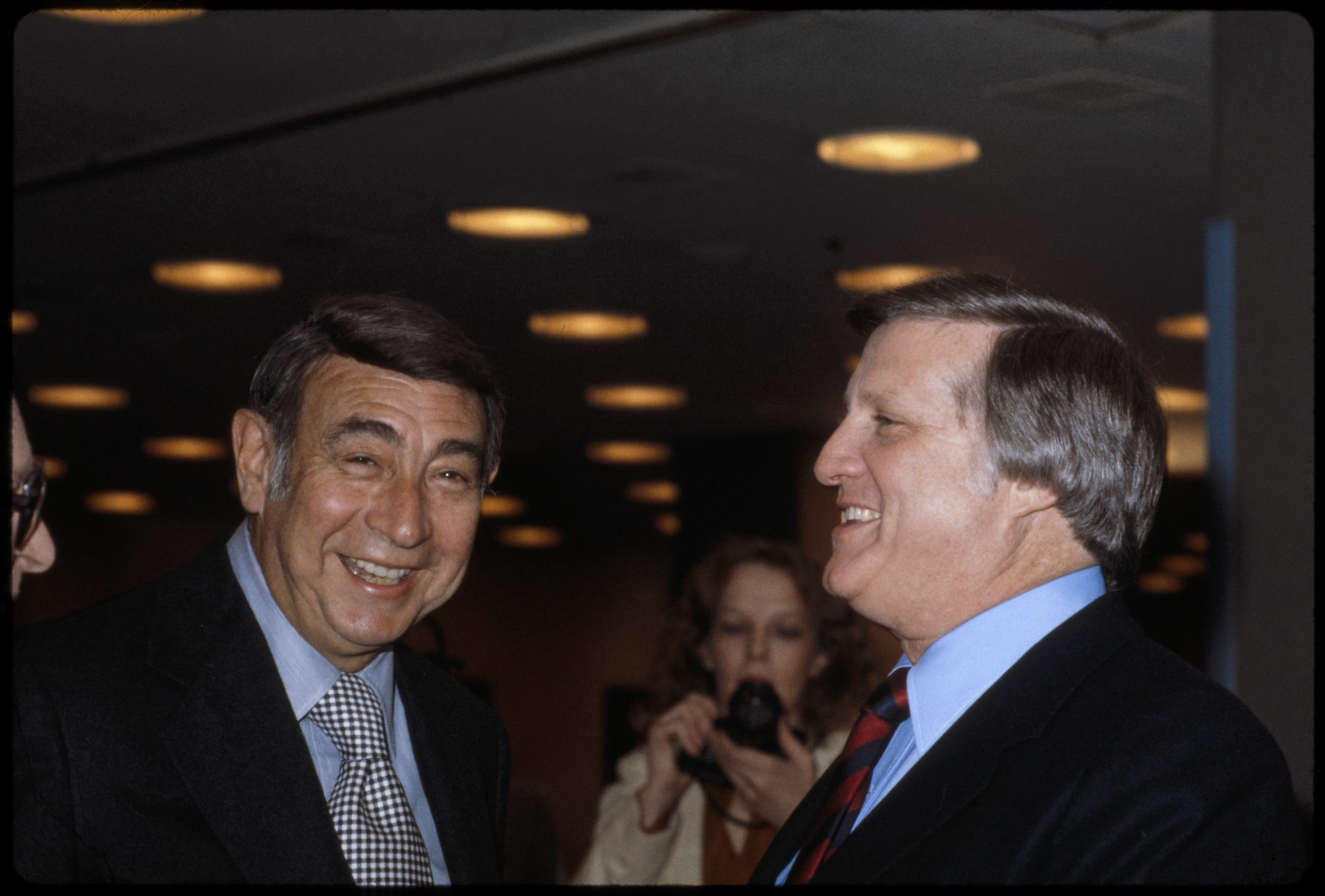
George Steinbrenner (R) with Howard Cosell (1980 photo)

- January 1 – Puerto Rico's governor declares three days of official mourning in memory of Roberto Clemente, 38, who perished in a plane crash yesterday while on a humanitarian mission to deliver food, clothing and emergency supplies to earthquake-ravaged Nicaragua. The Pittsburgh Pirates' superstar, 1966 National League Most Valuable Player and 1971 World Series MVP is grieved throughout Latin America and across the baseball world.
- January 3 – A group of investors headed by 42-year-old Cleveland shipping and ship-building magnate George M. Steinbrenner III purchases the New York Yankees from CBS. The entire deal is valued at $10 million and includes parking lots near Yankee Stadium, but when CBS buys those properties back from the Yankees, the purchase price for the team falls to $8.8 million. By the time of Steinbrenner's death 37 years later, the Yankees are valued at $1.6 billion.
- January 10 – The January edition of the 1973 amateur draft yields multiple future big-leaguers, including shortstop Alan Bannister (first overall selection), pitchers Donnie Moore, Mike Norris and Dick Ruthven, and catcher Jim Sundberg.
- January 11:
  - American League owners vote 8–4 to adopt the designated hitter position for a three-year trial period, after which (in 1975) it will be accorded permanent status. The DH, which future Commissioner of Baseball Bud Selig will call "the biggest rule change in the history of baseball to that point," is rejected by National League magnates and will not be adopted by the Senior Circuit until 2023.
  - The New York Yankees reveal that veteran MLB executive Gabe Paul has resigned as president and general manager of the Cleveland Indians and joined the 15-member ownership syndicate headed by George Steinbrenner that purchased the Bombers eight days earlier. Paul will occupy a senior executive post on the Yankee organization chart, but insists he will not displace incumbent president Michael Burke (also a minority owner) or general manager Lee MacPhail.
  - The Indians promote Paul's assistant, Phil Seghi, 63, to succeed his former boss as general manager.
  - Procter & Gamble heir Louis Nippert acquires majority control of the Cincinnati Reds. He has been a member of the Cincinnati-based ownership syndicate, originally led by Francis L. Dale, since it purchased the Reds in December 1966.
- January 18 – Free agent and longtime first baseman Orlando Cepeda, 35, signs with the Boston Red Sox, making the future Baseball Hall of Famer the first player signed to serve expressly as a designated hitter.
- January 24 – Left-handed pitcher Warren Spahn, with 363 triumphs the winningest southpaw of all time, is elected to the Hall of Fame in his first try on the Baseball Writers' Association of America ballot, receiving 316 of 380 votes.
- January 28 – The Hall of Fame's Special Veterans Committee selects 19th-century pitcher Mickey Welch and Giants first baseman George Kelly, plus umpire Billy Evans, for enshrinement.

=== February ===
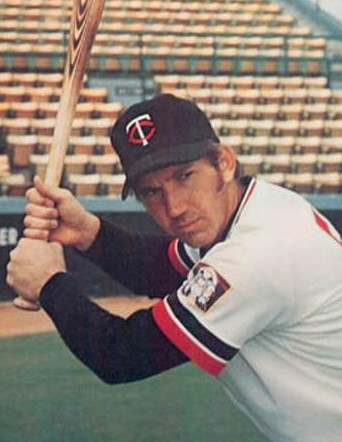
Danny Thompson in 1974

- February 1 – Commissioner Bowie Kuhn announces the selection of Monte Irvin for the Hall of Fame by the Special Committee on the Negro Leagues.
- February 8 – MLB owners announce they will not open their spring training camps while negotiations with the players over a new collective bargaining agreement are in progress. MLBPA executive director Marvin Miller responds by charging that the owners' action constitutes an illegal lockout. Spring training is slated to open by March 1.
- February 14 – A column in the Minneapolis Tribune reveals that Minnesota Twins shortstop Danny Thompson, 26, has been diagnosed with leukemia. He will be able to play four more full MLB seasons, enduring aggressive anti-cancer therapies, before the disease claims his life ten weeks after appearing in his final game on October 2, 1976.
- February 25 – Major-league owners and the players' union agree on a three-year CBA that ensures that all 24 spring training camps can open on time. The deal hinges on a major breakthrough: the owners concede binding salary arbitration for eligible players, as long as there are no modifications to the reserve clause system.
- February 27 – Chicago White Sox slugger and reigning American League Most Valuable Player Dick Allen signs a three-year contract for an estimated $250,000 per year, making him the highest-paid player in major league history.
- February 28 – The Montreal Expos send hurler Carl Morton to the Atlanta Braves for veteran righty Pat Jarvis. Morton, 29, was the 1970 National League Rookie of the Year after winning 18 games for the second-year expansion team, but is only 17–31 for Montreal since; he'll post double-digit victory seasons with the Braves from 1973 through 1975.

=== March ===
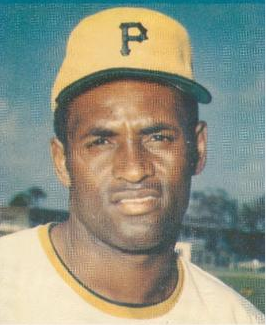
Roberto Clemente (1972)

- March 5 – New York Yankees teammates and fellow left-handed pitchers Fritz Peterson and Mike Kekich arrive at spring training and announce that they have swapped their wives and families. Even the family dogs are traded.
- March 8 – After only one season with the Cleveland Indians, former American League batting champion Alex Johnson is traded to the Texas Rangers for pitchers Vince Colbert and Rich Hinton. The Rangers become the sixth team Johnson has played for in his decade in the major leagues.
- March 20 – In a special election held by the Baseball Writers' Association of America, the late Roberto Clemente receives 393 of 424 votes to earn entry into the Hall of Fame. The Hall's board of directors had earlier waived the five-year-wait rule for Clemente.
- March 24 – The Cleveland Indians trade catcher Ray Fosse and infielder Jack Heidemann to the Oakland Athletics for catcher Dave Duncan and outfielder George Hendrick.
- March 26 – Denny McLain, who won 31 games for the Detroit Tigers in 1968, becoming the last MLB pitcher to win 30 games, is released by the Atlanta Braves. His career tarnished by his 1970 suspension for association with known gamblers, McLain never pitches in the major leagues again.
- March 29 – Orange baseballs, the brainchild of Oakland Athletics owner Charlie Finley, are used in the Athletics' 11–5 exhibition loss to the Cleveland Indians.

=== April ===
- April 6:
  - At Three Rivers Stadium, 51,695 fans watch as the jersey #21 of the late Roberto Clemente is retired. The Pittsburgh Pirates then beat the St. Louis Cardinals 7–5, with a ninth-inning rally.
  - At Fenway Park, Ron Blomberg of the New York Yankees becomes the first designated hitter in major league history. He is walked by Boston Red Sox pitcher Luis Tiant in his first plate appearance. Boston wins 15–5, however, powered by two home runs and six runs batted in from sophomore catcher Carlton Fisk.
  - At Oakland–Alameda County Coliseum, Tony Oliva of the Minnesota Twins becomes the first designated hitter to homer, with a first-inning shot off Catfish Hunter.
- April 10 – The Kansas City Royals open their new park, Royals Stadium, with a 12–1 rout of the Texas Rangers. The game is attended by 39,464 fans braving 39-degree weather.
- April 17:
  - Philadelphia Phillies pitcher Dick Ruthven, the first player selected in the secondary phase of the January 1973 amateur draft out of Fresno State, makes his major league debut without playing in the minors. He starts against the Montreal Expos, allowing four runs in less than two innings, but does not figure in the decision as the Phillies win 9–6.
  - The San Francisco Giants sell the contract of former starting third baseman Jim Ray Hart, 31, to the New York Yankees. Hart will assume the role of the Bombers' primary designated hitter with Ron Blomberg gaining playing time at first base.
- April 27 – In 50-degree weather, Kansas City Royals rookie Steve Busby no-hits the host Detroit Tigers 3–0. For the Royals, who began play in 1969, it's the first no-hitter in franchise history, and the first in Tiger Stadium since Virgil Trucks' in 1952. With the designated hitter rule in effect, Busby becomes the first pitcher of a no-hitter to not come to bat.
- April 28 – The San Francisco Giants' Jim Willoughby tosses a four-hit, complete game shutout and Bobby Bonds provides the only run he needs with a first-inning homer off Reggie Cleveland, as the Giants defeat the St. Louis Cardinals 1–0 at Busch Memorial Stadium. The loss gives the Cardinals an abysmal 2–15 record for 1973—but they will battle back to reach .500 in late June and take the National League East's divisional lead July 22, before ultimately placing second by the end of the campaign.
- April 29 – Michael Burke, president of the New York Yankees since 1966, resigns amid rumors of disagreements with general partner George Steinbrenner. Burke remains a limited partner in the Yanks' ownership group, which took control of the club on January 3.
- April 30 – All 24 teams are off. It will be the last time all teams would receive a day off during the regular season (except for All-Star breaks and labor stoppages) until June 29, 1998.

=== May ===
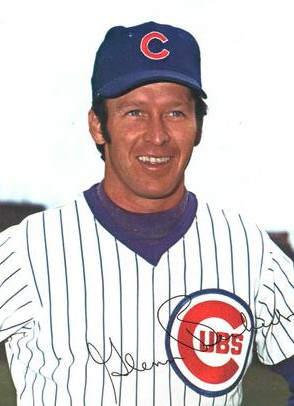
Glenn Beckert

- May 4 – José Pagán's sacrifice fly in the bottom of the 20th inning gives the Philadelphia Phillies a 5–4 victory over the Atlanta Braves. Both managers are ejected during the marathon contest: the Phillies' Danny Ozark during the 17th inning, and the Braves' Eddie Mathews in the 20th, when he argues the decisive "safe" call at home plate.
- May 8:
  - For the second time in his career, Willie Stargell of the Pittsburgh Pirates hits a home run out of Dodger Stadium. His blast off Andy Messersmith hits the right field pavilion roof 470 feet away. His first home run, a 506-foot shot, came off Alan Foster on August 5, 1969. The Los Angeles Dodgers win, 7–4.
  - In a 9–7 losing effort against the San Francisco Giants, St. Louis Cardinals ace Bob Gibson makes his 242nd consecutive start. It is a new 20th-century record, passing that of Red Ruffing, who never pitched in relief the last ten years of his career.
  - Whitey Lockman, manager of the Chicago Cubs, is ejected by Shag Crawford in the 11th inning of a road game against the San Diego Padres. Coach Ernie Banks takes over, unofficially becoming the first black manager in major league baseball. With Banks at the helm, the Cubs push across the winning run in the 12th on a pinch-hit double by Joe Pepitone.
- May 9 – Johnny Bench of the Cincinnati Reds belts three home runs off fellow future Hall-of-Famer Steve Carlton for the second time in his career, in a 9–7 victory over the Philadelphia Phillies. Bench knocks in seven runs.
- May 10 – The Oakland Athletics bang out 23 hits, most by any MLB club in a game in 1973, and thrash the Texas Rangers 17–2 at Arlington Stadium.
- May 11 – Manager Leo Durocher returns to the Houston Astros' dugout after being sidelined since April 20 by diverticulitis. In his absence, the Astros have gone 14–3 under coach Preston Gómez and climbed to second place in the National League West.
- May 15:
  - Nolan Ryan of the California Angels pitches the first of his seven career no-hitters, defeating the Kansas City Royals, 3–0 at Royals Stadium. Ryan fans 12 and issues three bases on balls.
  - At County Stadium, Dave May's 17th-inning walk-off home run enables his Milwaukee Brewers to edge the Cleveland Indians, 2–1. The 15–15 Brewers are the only team in the American League East with a .500-or-above record.
- May 17 – California Angels centerfielder Bobby Valentine, 23, suffers a career-altering compound leg fracture when he catches his spikes in the outfield fence at Anaheim Stadium trying to flag down a home run by the Oakland Athletics' Dick Green. Valentine, considered a potential "five-tool" talent and a centerpiece of the Angels' massive trade with the Los Angeles Dodgers the previous winter, will miss the rest of the season and his MLB playing career will be limited by the serious injury.
- May 19:
  - Glenn Beckert of the Chicago Cubs is held hitless by the Pittsburgh Pirates' Ken Brett, halting this season's longest MLB hitting streak at 26 games. During the skein, which began April 18, Beckert batted .355 (38-for-107) with nine extra-base hits. Brett shuts down the whole Chicago lineup today on three hits, winning 3–0.
  - The Atlanta Braves trade Andre Thornton to the Cubs in exchange for Joe Pepitone.
- May 20 – The 12–23 Texas Rangers make a five-player deal with a division rival, sending pitcher Rich Hand, catcher Rick Stelmaszek and first baseman Mike Epstein to the 21–14 California Angels for pitcher Lloyd Allen and first baseman Jim Spencer.
- May 24:
  - Willie Davis of the Los Angeles Dodgers gets six hits, all singles, in a 19-inning, 7–3 loss to the New York Mets at Dodger Stadium. The record will still stand, as of 2017, for most hits in a game by a Dodger.
  - Bert Blyleven of the Minnesota Twins one-hits the Kansas City Royals, 2–0 at Metropolitan Stadium. The lone Kansas City safety is a fifth-inning bunt single by Ed Kirkpatrick.
- May 27 – Beset by financial troubles, C. Arnholt Smith, majority owner of the five-year-old San Diego Padres, announces he is selling the team to Joseph Danzansky and two partners for $12 million. Danzansky's group plans to move the franchise to Washington, D.C. The city attorney for San Diego reacts by filing an $84 million suit for damages against Smith, Danzansky and the National League seeking payment for the team's stadium lease, which has 15 years to run, and other anticipated lost revenues.
- May 28 – Dick Allen blasts a three-run home in the home half of the 22nd inning to give the Chicago White Sox a 6–3 victory over the Cleveland Indians in a game that was suspended May 26 in the 17th inning. Later on this day, in the regularly scheduled game, knuckleball artist Wilbur Wood improves to 13–3 by tossing a four-hit shutout. Their 4–0 triumph gives the 26–14 ChiSox a 3½-game lead in the American League West.
- May 31:
  - At Wrigley Field, the Chicago Cubs score ten first-inning runs against the Houston Astros and cruise to a 16–8 win.
  - Ken Holtzman and Rollie Fingers combine for a one-hitter in a 6–0 Oakland Athletics triumph over the New York Yankees in The Bronx. The Yanks' Matty Alou touches Holtzman for a seventh-inning single for his team's only safety.

=== June ===
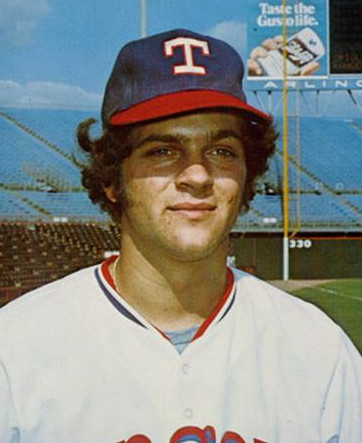
David Clyde

- June 5 – Left-handed hurler David Clyde, a Houston high-school phenom, is chosen by his home-state Texas Rangers as the #1 selection in the June 1973 Major League Baseball draft. After the Philadelphia Phillies take catcher John Stearns with the second pick and the Milwaukee Brewers use the third overall pick to select shortstop Robin Yount, outfielder Dave Winfield of the University of Minnesota is selected fourth by the San Diego Padres. Both Clyde and Winfield will go straight to the major leagues; Yount will need only one year of minor-league seasoning, but he and Winfield will end up the Baseball Hall of Fame.
- June 7 – The 28–25 New York Yankees, enmeshed in another tight American League East divisional race, strengthen their mound staff by acquiring Pat Dobson from the Atlanta Braves and "Sudden" Sam McDowell from the San Francisco Giants. Dobson goes 9–8 for the 1973 Yankees, then wins 19 games in 1974 with a 3.07 ERA and 12 complete games. McDowell is less effective, posting a 6–14 (4.20 ERA) record over the same span.
- June 9 – After the Old Timers' Game at Shea Stadium, Willie Mays puts on his own show with a home run and a circus catch, and the New York Mets top the Los Angeles Dodgers 4–2. For Mays, older than a half dozen of the old Mets, it is the 655th homer of his career. Rusty Staub drives in two runs to back Jon Matlack. In the Old Timers' Game, the Brooklyn Dodgers/New York Yankees team loses to the Mets 1–0 in two innings.
- June 12:
  - The Cincinnati Reds add a 5 ft 8 in (1.73 m) left-handed pitcher who will be a big contributor to their division, pennant and World Series winners from this season through 1979, obtaining Fred Norman from the San Diego Padres for pitcher Mike Johnson, outfielder Gene Locklear and cash.
  - The New York Yankees trade left-hander Mike Kekich to the Cleveland Indians for righty Lowell Palmer. Fritz Peterson, the Yankees' southpaw with whom Kekich exchanged wives, children, and dogs (see March 5, 1973), remains in The Bronx.
- June 13 – At Riverfront Stadium, St. Louis Cardinals pitcher Rick Wise loses a no-hitter when the Cincinnati Reds' Joe Morgan singles with one out in the ninth inning. It will be the only hit Wise allows in an 8–0 shutout win. Wise, who no-hit the Reds at Riverfront in 1971, was bidding to join Addie Joss as the only pitchers to throw two no–hitters against the same team.
- June 19:
  - In the Los Angeles Dodgers' 4–0 victory over the Cincinnati Reds, Pete Rose (single) and Willie Davis (HR) each collect their 2,000th career hit.
  - Dave Winfield debuts in the San Diego Padres' 7–3 loss to the Houston Astros. Winfield—who was also drafted by the Minnesota Vikings of the NFL and basketball's Atlanta Hawks (NBA) and Utah Stars (ABA)—goes one for four in his debut, and he will never spend a day in the minor leagues. After a 22-year career, he is voted into the Baseball Hall of Fame in 2001.
- June 20:
  - Cy Acosta of the Chicago White Sox becomes the first American League pitcher to bat since the DH rule went into effect earlier this season. Acosta strikes out in the eighth inning, but is credited with an 8–3 victory over the California Angels.
  - Bobby Bonds leads off with a home run, but the San Francisco Giants lose 7–5 to Cincinnati. It is Bonds' 22nd leadoff home run, breaking Lou Brock's National League record.
- June 23 – Pitcher Ken Brett of the Philadelphia Phillies tops the Montreal Expos 7–2, and hits a home run for his fourth consecutive game, setting a major league record for a hurler. Previously, Brett hit home runs on June 9, 13, and 18. One of the best-hitting pitchers of the 1970s, Brett will slug ten home runs and bat .262 lifetime in 347 career at bats.
- June 27:
  - Before a packed house of 35,698 at Arlington Stadium, 18-year-old southpaw starting pitcher David Clyde, the first player selected in the 1973 Major League Baseball draft, makes his professional debut for the Texas Rangers by getting credit for a 4–3 win over the Minnesota Twins. The recent graduate of Houston's Westchester High School goes five innings and allows only one hit and two runs, striking out seven but walking eight hitters. He'll enjoy four more impressive outings in 1973, but the combination of being rushed to the big leagues and a shoulder injury will contribute to a mediocre MLB career: 18 wins, 33 losses, and a 4.63 career ERA in 84 games and 4161/3 innings pitched.
  - Joe Torre of the St. Louis Cardinals hits for the cycle in a 15–4 romp over the Pittsburgh Pirates at Three Rivers Stadium—the only "cycle" in the majors in 1973.
- June 28:
  - Willie Stargell hits his 300th career home run, helping his Pirates defeat the Cardinals 6–0.
  - Bob Bailey's RBI single delivers an 18-inning, 5–4 victory to the Montreal Expos over the Chicago Cubs in the completion of a game suspended due to darkness the previous evening at Wrigley Field, the only MLB stadium without arc lights. The contest began on June 27 as the second game of a doubleheader and had to be suspended in the 13th frame before it's resumed today. Then, in the regularly schedule game, the Cubs win 4–2 behind Milt Pappas.

=== July ===
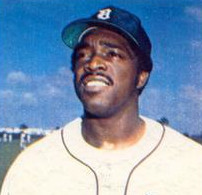
Ron LeFlore

- July 1:
  - Three Hall of Famers play major roles in today's 2–1 Minnesota Twins victory over the California Angels at Anaheim Stadium. The Angels' Frank Robinson spoils what would otherwise have been a perfect game thrown by Twins' southpaw Jim Kaat with his second-inning home run, with Rod Carew driving in both Minnesota tallies with his third-inning single. The game is played in a crisp one hour, 40 minutes.
  - Luis Aparicio, another future Hall of Famer, of the Boston Red Sox steals the 500th base of his career in a 9–5 loss to the Milwaukee Brewers. It is the highest total in the American League since Eddie Collins (741 career steals) retired in 1930.
- July 2 – The Detroit Tigers sign undrafted free agent Ron LeFlore. An outfielder and 25-year-old Detroit native, LeFlore is also an ex-convict who served over three years in Jackson State Prison for armed robbery and first played baseball seriously during his time as an inmate. He goes on to a nine-year career for the Tigers, Montreal Expos and Chicago White Sox in which he becomes the first player to lead each of the major leagues in stolen bases, and is selected to the 1976 American League All-Star team. He never returns to prison.
- July 3 – At Cleveland Stadium, brothers and starting pitchers Gaylord Perry (Indians) and Jim Perry (Tigers) hurl against each other for the only time in their careers. Neither finishes the game, but Gaylord is charged with the 5–4 loss. Two Norm Cash home runs help the Tigers.
- July 4:
  - The Minnesota Twins bring their first-round June draft pick, pitcher Eddie Bane, straight to the major leagues, in an attempt to boost interest and attendance (the brainchild of owner Calvin Griffith). Bane brings a 40–4 record with him from Arizona State University, and goes seven innings in his debut, a no-decision start. A crowd of 45,890 is on hand at Metropolitan Stadium.
  - The division leaders at the MLB season's traditional halfway point are the 48–34 Chicago Cubs in the National League East, 5½ games ahead of the St. Louis Cardinals; the 51–31 Los Angeles Dodgers in the NL West, 3½ lengths up on the San Francisco Giants; the 46–36 New York Yankees in the AL East, two games in front of the Baltimore Orioles; and the 45–37 Oakland Athletics, only one game ahead of the Minnesota Twins in the AL West. Only Oakland will make the postseason. Their eventual World Series foes, the New York Mets, are last in the NL East with 33–43 mark, 12 games behind the Cubs.
- July 9 – In a record-setting walkathon between the Cincinnati Reds and Montreal Expos, 25 bases on balls are handed out as Montreal strolls to an 11–6 win. Well off the American League's two-team mark of 30, this tops the National League record of 23, last reached on July 6, 1911 in a game between the Philadelphia Phillies and St. Louis Cardinals. Six Montreal pitchers walk 16, one short of the record for an NL team, while two Reds pitchers walk nine. Hal King pinch hits a grand slam for the Reds in the 6th inning, his second pinch homer in nine days.
- July 11:
  - Jim Northrup, batting leadoff for the Detroit Tigers, drives in eight runs in a 14–2 win over Texas.
  - In San Diego, the Pittsburgh Pirates drub the Padres 10–2. Willie Stargell contributes the 302nd home run of his career to pass Ralph Kiner as the all-time Pirate home run leader.
  - The New York Mets sell the contract of third baseman Jim Fregosi to the Texas Rangers. The Mets had obtained Fregosi, a six-time All-Star, from the California Angels in December 1971 for Nolan Ryan and three other players. This transaction closes the book on his Mets career: 146 games played, 108 hits, five home runs, 43 runs batted in, and a .233 batting average.
- July 15:
  - Willie McCovey hits his 400th career home run, helping the San Francisco Giants beat the Pittsburgh Pirates, 12–0.
  - Nolan Ryan pitches his second no-hitter of the season (and the second of seven for his career). He strikes out 17 Detroit Tigers as the visiting California Angels win, 6–0.
- July 20 – Wilbur Wood of the Chicago White Sox starts and loses both games of a doubleheader against the New York Yankees, 12–2 and 7–0. After starting the season 13–3, Wood's won–lost mark is now 18–14.
- July 21 – Hank Aaron of the Atlanta Braves hits a Ken Brett fastball into the left-center field stands of Atlanta–Fulton County Stadium during an 8–4 loss to the Philadelphia Phillies. It is career home run #700 for Aaron, only the second player to reach that milestone. Only Babe Ruth, with 714, has more.
- July 24 – The National League wins the All-Star Game at Kansas City, 7–1. A record 54 players are used, including Willie Mays, who strikes out in his final All-Star appearance, and Catfish Hunter, who sustains a fractured thumb that will sideline him for four weeks. Hunter has a 15–3 record at the time. Johnny Bench, Bobby Bonds and Willie Davis all hit home runs for the NL and Bonds edges out Davis for the game MVP by one vote.
- July 26 – Pat Dobson of the New York Yankees throws 11 shutout innings against the Milwaukee Brewers until he's relieved by Sparky Lyle in the top of the 12th. In the bottom of the frame, Thurman Munson's RBI single gives the first-place Yankees (and Lyle) a 1–0 victory.
- July 30 – At the Oakland–Alameda County Coliseum, Jim Bibby of the Texas Rangers no-hits the Oakland Athletics 6–0. The no-hitter is the first in the history of the 13-year-old Washington Senators/Texas Rangers franchise.
- July 31 – The Athletics sign free-agent veteran second baseman Mike Andrews, released 15 days earlier by the Chicago White Sox. They also acquire veteran outfielders Jesús Alou and Vic Davalillo. All will play significant roles in the postseason to come.

=== August ===
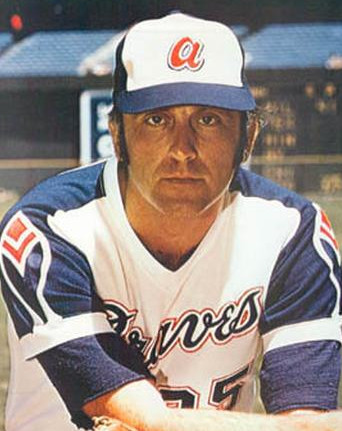
Phil Niekro

- August 1 – With the score tied at 2–2 in the top of the ninth at Fenway Park, in an incident that typifies both the Red Sox–Yankees rivalry and the feud between the two catchers involved, Thurman Munson of the New York Yankees barrels into Carlton Fisk of the Boston Red Sox while trying to score on Gene Michael's missed squeeze attempt. The incident triggers a 10-minute bench-clearing brawl in which both catchers are ejected. The Red Sox win 3–2 in the bottom of the ninth, with Mario Guerrero's two-out single scoring Bob Montgomery (who had replaced the ejected Fisk) for the winning run.
- August 2 – Future Hall-of-Famer George Brett, in his third pro season, makes his MLB debut by going one-for-four for the Kansas City Royals against the Chicago White Sox and Stan Bahnsen at Comiskey Park. The first of his 3,154 career hits is a fourth-inning single to left field.
- August 5 – Atlanta Braves knuckleballer Phil Niekro no-hits the San Diego Padres 9–0. He walks three and strikes out four in recording the first no-hitter by the franchise since it moved to Atlanta.
- August 6 – An exhibition game between the Milwaukee Brewers and the Atlanta Braves at Milwaukee draws 33,337. The Brewers win, 7–5, in the fourth and last exhibition between the two teams. But the big thrill is provided by Hank Aaron, a Milwaukee Brave from 1954 until the franchise moved after the 1965 season, who hits a home run.
- August 7 – Two days after Phil Niekro's no-hitter, the Braves purchase Joe Niekro, Phil's pitching brother, from the Detroit Tigers.
- August 11 – Chicago White Sox rookie Brian Downing cracks his first major league hit, a home run off Detroit's Mickey Lolich. Downing's debut dinger is a first in the majors since at least 1945 – an inside-the-park homer. It'll be matched in two years by the Giants Johnnie LeMaster, who will do it in his first at-bat.
- August 15:
  - At Three Rivers Stadium, Cincinnati Reds ace Jack Billingham beats the host Pittsburgh Pirates 1–0, notching his seventh shutout of the season. This ties the club record set by Hod Eller back in 1919.
  - Future Hall-of-Fame left-hander Jim Kaat is claimed off waivers by the Chicago White Sox, ending his 15-season-long tenure with the Washington Senators/Minnesota Twins franchise, for whom he won 190 games.
- August 17 – The New York Mets' Willie Mays hits the 660th (and last) home run of his career off Don Gullett of Cincinnati, but the Reds win 2–1 in 10 innings at Shea Stadium, after pinch hitter Hal King hits a walk-off home run, his third pinch homer of the year.
- August 21 – Against the Indians at Cleveland Stadium, Stan Bahnsen of the Chicago White Sox has a no-hitter broken up with two out in the ninth on a single by ex-teammate Walt Williams. The hit is the only one Bahnsen allows as the White Sox defeat the Indians 4–0.
- August 26 – In the second inning at Memorial Stadium, Paul Blair hits an inside-the-park grand slam against the Kansas City Royals. Outfielders Amos Otis and Steve Hovley collide when both attempt to catch Blair's deep fly. Baltimore goes on to defeat Kansas City, 10–1.
- August 30 – Detroit Tigers manager Billy Martin is fired with one year left on a reported $65,000 annual contract. Detroit, defending American League East champion, is 71–63 in 1973, in third place and 7½ games behind the front-running Baltimore Orioles. Third-base coach Joe Schultz is named acting manager and he will serve out the regular season.

=== September ===
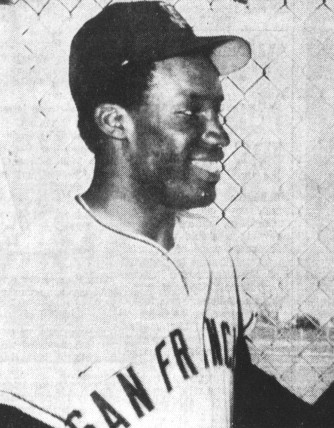
Bobby Bonds

- September 1 – As the final full month of the 1973 season begins, the Baltimore Orioles and defending World Series champion Oakland Athletics sit atop their American League divisions by margins of six and 5½ games, respectively. In the National League West, the Los Angeles Dodgers hold a three-game advantage over the Cincinnati Reds with each team having 26 contests to play. However, an unusual divisional race is unfolding in the National League East. All six teams, even the last-place Philadelphia Phillies, are tightly bunched and only six games separate them. The first-place St. Louis Cardinals are the lone team over .500, at 68–66, and they hold a one-game lead over runner-up Pittsburgh (65–65).
- September 2 – Joe Burke resigns as general manager of the Texas Rangers. Although GM only since 1972, Burke has held senior posts in the franchise's front office since its founding as the expansion Washington Senators in 1961. He is succeeded by Dan O'Brien, a Rangers' vice president and former minor-league front-office executive.
- September 3 – The San Francisco Giants overcome a 7–1 deficit to beat the Dodgers 11–8 at Candlestick Park during a nationally televised Monday Night Baseball game on NBC. Bobby Bonds hits a walk-off grand slam into the right field seats to win the game for the Giants.
- September 4 – In the midst of a scorching, month-long streak that sees them win 22 of 28 games between August 25 and September 25, the Cincinnati Reds plate five runs in the top of the tenth inning to defeat Houston at the Astrodome, 12–7. The victory enables the Reds to move into undisputed possession of first place in the NL West, one game ahead of the Los Angeles Dodgers.
- September 6:
  - After dropping three of four games to the St. Louis Cardinals at their home field, the 67–69 Pittsburgh Pirates unexpectedly fire second-year manager Bill Virdon, and ask former pilot Danny Murtaugh to return to uniform and take over for the rest of the season and 1974. Murtaugh, 55, will begin his fourth and final term (since August 1957) as the Pirates' manager; he previously led them to World Series championships in 1960 and 1971. He had moved into the Pittsburgh front office in November 1971 because of ongoing health issues.
  - Brothers Felipe Alou and Matty Alou are claimed on waivers from the New York Yankees by NL East divisional contenders. Felipe's contract is sold to the Montreal Expos and Matty goes to the St. Louis Cardinals.
- September 7 – Future Hall of Fame pilot Whitey Herzog is fired from his first MLB managerial assignment by the Texas Rangers with the club in the AL West cellar at 47–91. Del Wilber serves as interim manager for one game before owner Bob Short names Billy Martin, fired by the Tigers only days earlier, as Herzog's permanent replacement.
- September 17 – The five-year-old Montreal Expos achieve something they have never done before—reaching first place in the NL East this late in a season. It happens after the opening game of a doubleheader, when they beat the St. Louis Cardinals 5–4 on a two-run, ninth-inning rally. But their time on the throne is short-lived: a 12-inning loss in game two of the twin-bill drops the Expos into the division's runner-up position.
- September 19 – The Pittsburgh Pirates lose the first game of a crucial three-game series at Shea Stadium for first place 7–3 to the New York Mets when Cleon Jones registers just the second two home run performance of his 11-season career (the first time was on April 6, in the season opener against the Philadelphia Phillies).
- September 20 – At Shea Stadium, in the top of the 13th inning, with Richie Zisk on first, the Pittsburgh Pirates' Dave Augustine belts what appears to be a home run over the left field wall. New York Mets left fielder Cleon Jones turns to play the ball off the wall and the ball hits the top of the wall and bounces right into Jones' glove on the fly. Jones turns and throws to relay man Wayne Garrett, who throws home to catcher Ron Hodges to nail Zisk at the plate. Following the "Ball on the Wall" play, the Mets win the game in the bottom half of the inning to move within half a game of the first place Pirates. The Mets are now 14–6 during the month of September.

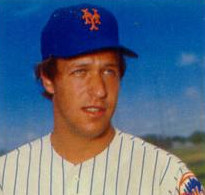
Jon Matlack

- September 22:
  - At Milwaukee County Stadium, the Baltimore Orioles' Doyle Alexander scatters seven hits and defeats the Brewers 7–1, enabling the Os to clinch their fourth American League East division title in five years.
  - The New York Mets gain sole possession of first place in the NL East, as Jon Matlack defeats the visiting St. Louis Cardinals 2–0. Wayne Garrett's two-run homer in the third inning provides all the run support that Matlack needs.
- September 23 – With Vida Blue winning his 20th game, the Oakland Athletics capture their third consecutive AL West title with a 10–5 victory over the Chicago White Sox at Comiskey Park. The Sox' Wilbur Wood, already a 24-game-winner, sustains his 20th defeat of 1973, making him the first hurler since Baseball Hall of Famer Walter Johnson (25–20 in 1916) to both win and lose 20 or more games in the same season.
- September 24 – The defending National League champion Cincinnati Reds clinch their third NL West crown in four seasons with a 2–1 victory over the San Diego Padres behind journeyman right-hander Dick Baney at Riverfront Stadium.
- September 27:
  - Capping a memorable season, Nolan Ryan strikes out 16 Minnesota Twins en route to a 5–4, 11-inning win for the California Angels. Rich Reese is Ryan's final strikeout, his 383rd of the season, which breaks Sandy Koufax's season record.
  - Reggie Cleveland of the St. Louis Cardinals fires the 16th and last one-hitter of 1973, defeating the Chicago Cubs 2–0 at Busch Memorial Stadium. The Canadian righty faces the minimum of 27 batters: Ken Rudolph's sixth-inning single is the only blemish on what would have been a perfect game, and Rudolph is promptly erased on a double play. It's Cleveland's final appearance in a St. Louis uniform; he'll be traded in December.
- September 29 – In his penultimate game of 1973, 39-year-old Hank Aaron hammers his 713th career regular-season home run in a 7–0 victory over the Houston Astros at Atlanta–Fulton County Stadium. The victim is southpaw Jerry Reuss. The homer is Aaron's 40th of the season, and leaves him one shy of Babe Ruth's all-time record, which he will continue to pursue in 1974.
- September 30:
  - At the close of the last day of the regular season, the National League East race still isn't resolved. Three teams remain mathematically eligible, even though only one has an above-.500 record. The "survivors" are the New York Mets (81–79), St. Louis Cardinals (81–81) and Pittsburgh Pirates (80–81). To settle matters, games that had been rained out during 1973 must be played on Monday, October 1: the Mets are scheduled for a doubleheader at Wrigley Field to make up games washed out Friday and Saturday, and the Pirates must make up a July 21 rainout against the San Diego Padres at Three Rivers Stadium. An unprecedented three-way tie looms if the Mets are swept in their doubleheader and the Pirates defeat San Diego.
  - The New York Yankees play their final game in the original Yankee Stadium, losing to the Detroit Tigers 8–5. "The House That Ruth Built" will remain closed, and the Yanks will share Shea Stadium with the Mets, until 1976 while The Bronx' landmark undergoes major renovations. After 11 years at the helm (944–806, .539, three pennants, two World Series titles), Ralph Houk resigns as the Bombers' manager. His resignation also ends Houk's 35-year career in the Yankee organization.
  - The second-place Boston Red Sox relieve fourth-year manager Eddie Kasko (345–295, .539) of his duties. They will immediately name former MLB catcher Darrell Johnson their skipper for 1974. Johnson has just directed the Triple-A Pawtucket Red Sox to the Governors' Cup and Junior World Series titles.

=== October ===
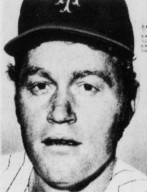
Rusty Staub

- October 1:
  - With the National League West champion Cincinnati Reds and potential NL East co-leader St. Louis Cardinals awaiting the outcome, the East Division race is decided by two make-up, regular-season contests. The San Diego Padres, losers of 102 games and last-place finishers in the West, fly to Pittsburgh, where they eliminate the Pirates, 4–3. And in Chicago, the New York Mets ride the pitching of Tom Seaver and Tug McGraw to a 6–4 victory over the Cubs to sew up the NL East pennant at 82–79. With the division finally decided, a potential second game of a Mets–Cubs doubleheader is cancelled. The Mets, in fifth place on September 1, go 19–8 over the next 30 days to grab the division flag.
  - The controversial—but ultimately Hall-of-Fame-worthy—managerial career of Leo Durocher comes to an end when he resigns from the Houston Astros. Now 68, the hyper-competitive and abrasive "Leo the Lip" began that career as the 33-year-old shortstop–manager of the 1939 Brooklyn Dodgers, who he immediately led into the first division and then, two years later, to the 1941 National League pennant. Moving to the New York Giants in July 1948, he oversaw a turnaround on the field, then coaxed them to an NL pennant in 1951 and the 1954 World Series championship. However, Durocher's career was tarnished when he was suspended by Commissioner of Baseball Happy Chandler for the entire 1947 season for "conduct detrimental to baseball" and, after quitting the Giants in 1955, he was rejected by at least three MLB teams for open managerial jobs. Late in his career, he skippered the 1966–1972 Chicago Cubs and 1972–1973 Astros. His final managers' ledger is 2,008–1,709 (.540), three NL pennants and one World Series title over 24 seasons. Preston Gómez, a Houston coach who went 16–5 as the Astros' acting manager during Durocher's two absences for ill health in 1973, is immediately named Leo's successor.
- October 8 – In Game 3 of the 1973 National League Championship Series, the New York Mets' Rusty Staub homers in the first and second innings as the Mets crush the Cincinnati Reds 9–2 at New York's Shea Stadium to take a two-games-to-one series lead. The game features a fifth-inning, bench-clearing brawl triggered by Pete Rose's hard slide into Mets' shortstop Bud Harrelson as he attempts to break up a double play. Punches are thrown but neither man is ejected. Rose and Harrelson will later be teammates on the 1979 Philadelphia Phillies.
- October 10 – As in 1969, when no one thought the New York Mets would win the National League pennant, they "amazingly" repeat history as Tom Seaver pitches them into the 1973 World Series with a 7–2 victory over the favored Cincinnati Reds in Game 5 of the 1973 National League Championship Series. New York has 13 hits in the contest.
- October 11:
  - Catfish Hunter tosses a five-hitter and Joe Rudi, Vic Davalillo and Jesús Alou deliver RBIs, enabling the Oakland Athletics to down the Baltimore Orioles, 3–0, in the decisive Game 5 of the 1973 American League Championship Series. Oakland wins its second consecutive American League championship and will face the Mets in the World Series.
  - The Detroit Tigers sign former New York Yankees' skipper Ralph Houk, 54, to a three-year contract as their manager. The Houk-to-Detroit rumor has been circulating since "The Major" quit the Bombers on September 29. On October 25, the Yankees will ask outgoing American League president Joe Cronin to investigate alleged tampering with Houk while he was under contract.
- October 13 – The Oakland Athletics score two unearned runs in the third inning of Game 1 of the 1973 World Series when the usually sure-handed Félix Millán allows a ground ball to go through his legs. They are the only runs New York Mets starter Jon Matlack allows, but they're enough to give Oakland the 2–1 victory.
- October 14 – In one of the more bizarre incidents in World Series history, the Mets defeat the Athletics 10–7 in extra innings in Game 2 by scoring four runs in the top of the 12th; three of those runs result from two errors by Oakland second baseman Mike Andrews. After the game, Athletics owner Charlie O. Finley forces Andrews to sign a false affidavit stating he was disabled, which would render him ineligible for the remainder of the series. Oakland manager Dick Williams rallies to Andrews' defense and Commissioner of Baseball Bowie Kuhn nullifies the affidavit. Nevertheless, Finley orders Williams to bench Andrews. In defiance, Williams sends Andrews to the plate as a pinch hitter in Game 4 in New York three nights later, and the Mets' home crowd gives him a standing ovation.
- October 18 – The Philadelphia Phillies acquire starting second baseman Dave Cash, 25, a future three-time All-Star, from the Pittsburgh Pirates for lefthanded pitcher Ken Brett.

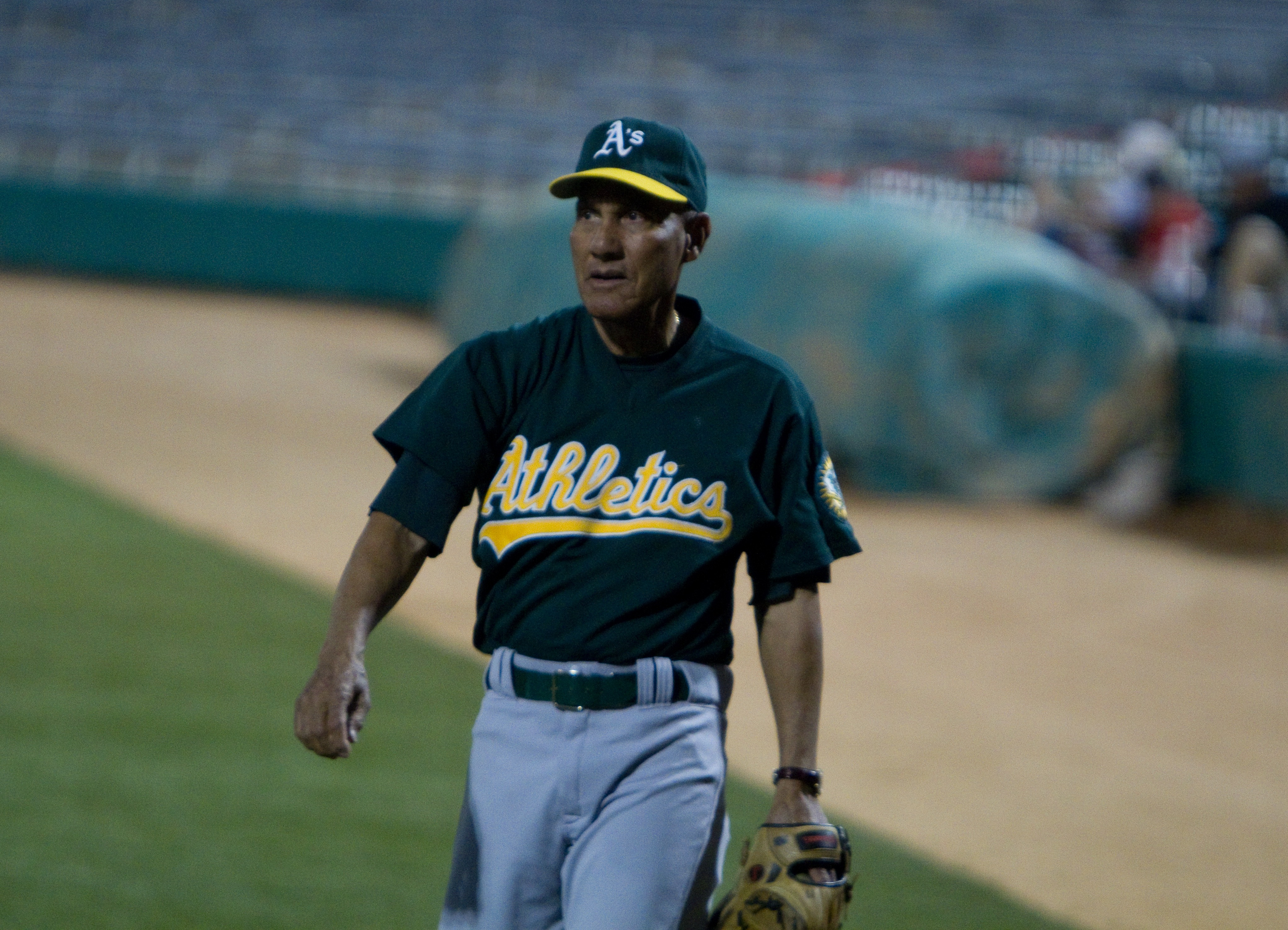
Bert Campaneris in 2010

- October 21:
  - Bert Campaneris and Reggie Jackson hit two-run home runs in the third inning as the Oakland Athletics defeat the New York Mets, 5–2, in Game 7 of the World Series for their second straight world championship. Jackson is selected the Series MVP.
  - Immediately after the game, Oakland manager Dick Williams announces his resignation for "personal reasons." Rumors immediately surface that he will join George Steinbrenner's New York Yankees, who still seek a manager after Ralph Houk's September 29 resignation. His consecutive World Series championships in 1972–1973 will be a deciding factor that enables Williams to claim a berth in the Baseball Hall of Fame in 2008.
- October 22 – The California Angels and Milwaukee Brewers pull off a nine-player transaction in which the Angels send southpaw pitchers Steve Barber and Clyde Wright, catcher Art Kusnyer, outfielder Ken Berry and cash to the Brewers for pitchers Skip Lockwood and Gary Ryerson, catcher Ellie Rodríguez, and outfielders Ollie Brown and Joe Lahoud.
- October 23:
  - Athletics owner Charlie Finley reveals that he will not release manager Dick Williams from his contract unless he receives adequate compensation from the team that signs him. Williams had resigned following the World Series victory two days earlier.
  - The Detroit Tigers begin their rebuild by trading 34-year-old stalwart second baseman Dick McAuliffe to the Boston Red Sox for young reserve outfielder Ben Oglivie.
- October 24 – The Red Sox continue what will be an extremely active off-season for them by exchanging right-handed pitchers with the Kansas City Royals, sending Marty Pattin to the Royals for Dick Drago.
- October 25:
  - The Chicago Cubs trade future Hall-of-Fame pitcher, 30-year-old Ferguson Jenkins, at this point a six-time 20-game winner, three-time All-Star and the 1971 National League Cy Young Award recipient, to the American League's Texas Rangers for two young infielders, Bill Madlock, 22, and Vic Harris, 23.
  - Another future Cooperstown enshrinee changes address when the San Francisco Giants send 35-year-old slugging first baseman Willie McCovey, a 6x All-Star, 1969 NL Most Valuable Player and 3x NL home run champ, to the San Diego Padres, along with outfielder Bernie Williams, for left-hander Mike Caldwell.
- October 26 – The Boston Red Sox pull off their third significant trade in four days, dealing two-time All-Star outfielder Reggie Smith and relief pitcher Ken Tatum to the St. Louis Cardinals for starting pitcher Rick Wise and outfielder Bernie Carbo.
- October 31 – The Pittsburgh Pirates acquire southpaw starting pitcher Jerry Reuss from the Houston Astros for young catcher Milt May.

=== November ===
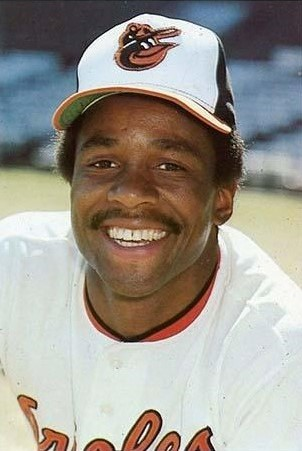
Al Bumbry

- November 1:
  - The New York Yankees revamp their front office after former general manager Lee MacPhail becomes president-elect of the American League. Limited partner Gabe Paul, 63, a longtime baseball executive, becomes club president and de facto GM. Paul recruits Tal Smith, 40, to serve directly under him as executive vice president of baseball operations. Smith is a former GM of the Houston Astros and began his MLB career working under Paul with the Cincinnati Reds.
  - The Oakland Athletics release Mike Andrews, ending the second baseman's eight-year MLB career.
- November 3 – Two trades will see four relief pitchers change teams: the Houston Astros send Cecil Upshaw, 31, to the Cleveland Indians for Jerry Johnson, 29; and the Chicago Cubs deal Bob Locker, 35, to the Oakland Athletics for Horacio Piña, 28.
- November 7:
  - The Chicago Cubs break up their longtime double-play combo by sending veteran second baseman Glenn Beckert, along with infielder Bobby Fenwick, to the San Diego Padres for outfielder Jerry Morales. Beckert, 33, is a four-time National League All-Star and 1968 Gold Glove Award-winner who has teamed up with shortstop Don Kessinger for nine MLB seasons.
  - The Philadelphia Phillies and Milwaukee Brewers swap relief pitchers, with the Phils acquiring veteran Frank Linzy, 33, for Bill Wilson, 31.
- November 9 – Still poised for a sale and transfer to Washington, D.C., the Padres continue to acquire veteran position players, trading pitcher Clay Kirby to the Cincinnati Reds for centerfielder Bobby Tolan and left-handed relief pitcher Dave Tomlin.
- November 27 – San Francisco Giants left fielder Gary Matthews, who hit .300 with 12 home runs and 58 RBI in 145 games, outpolls eight others receiving 11 of 24 nominations for the National League Rookie of the Year Award. The runners-up are Steve Rogers (P), Bob Boone (C), Dan Driessen (3B), Elías Sosa (P), Ron Cey (3B), Johnny Grubb (CF), Davey Lopes (2B) and Richie Zisk (RF).
- November 28 – Al Bumbry, centerfielder of the Baltimore Orioles, wins the 1973 American League Rookie of the Year Award, receiving 13.5 of 24 possible votes. Milwaukee Brewers second baseman Pedro García is the runner-up with three votes. Bumbry, 26, is a combat veteran of the Vietnam War and was awarded a Bronze Star.

=== December ===
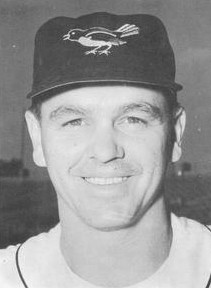
Hall-of-Fame manager Dick Williams, during his playing career

- December 4:
  - The Baltimore Orioles acquire southpaw starting pitcher Ross Grimsley from the Cincinnati Reds along with minor-league catcher Wallace Williams for infielder Junior Kennedy, outfielder Merv Rettenmund and minor-league catcher William Wood. Grimsley will win 18 games for the 1974 Orioles.
  - The Kansas City Royals send three players—including infielder Kurt Bevacqua and outfielder Ed Kirkpatrick—to the Pittsburgh Pirates for veteran right-hander Nelson Briles and infielder Fernando González. Starting pitcher Briles is the key player in the deal, but he suffers through two injury-riddled seasons in Kansas City.
- December 5:
  - The Montreal Expos and Los Angeles Dodgers pull off a major one-for-one trade when the Expos send record-setting relief pitcher Mike Marshall to Los Angeles for longtime Dodger centerfielder Willie Davis, a two-time NL All-Star and Gold Glove Award winner. In 1974, Marshall will shatter his own record for games pitched with 106 appearances, win 15 games, save 21 others (leading the Senior Circuit for the second straight year), capture the NL Cy Young Award (the first reliever to do so), and help the Dodgers win the pennant. Exactly one year from this day, Davis will be traded to the Texas Rangers despite a solid 1974 season with Montreal.
  - National League owners unanimously approve the transfer of the San Diego Padres to Washington, D.C., for the 1974 season under new ownership headed by Joseph Danzansky. However, "contingencies" involving the transaction—which center on the liability posed by the pending $84 million lawsuit brought by the city of San Diego—must be legally resolved by January 5, 1974, and the possibility exists that the league itself may temporarily take over the Padres, threatening the relocation plans.
- December 6:
  - The Houston Astros trade centerfielder Jimmy Wynn to the Los Angeles Dodgers in exchange for veteran southpaw pitcher Claude Osteen and minor league pitcher David Culpepper. Known as the "Toy Cannon," Wynn, 31, has slugged 223 homers over 11 seasons with Houston. Osteen, 34, is a two-time 20-game winner who compiled 147 victories in nine seasons for the Dodgers, won a 1965 World Series ring, and made three NL All-Star teams.
  - The Chicago Cubs continue to remake their roster, sending veteran catcher Randy Hundley, a former All-Star and Gold Glover, to the Minnesota Twins for fellow backstop George Mitterwald.
- December 7:
  - After parting with Willie McCovey six weeks earlier, the San Francisco Giants jettison another Baseball Hall of Famer, selling the contract of "the Dominican Dandy," Juan Marichal, to the Boston Red Sox. Ten-time All-Star Marichal, 35, has gone 238–140 (2.84 ERA) in 14 seasons with the Giants and won 20+ games six times. The Giants will retire his #27 uniform.
  - The New York Yankees acquire outfielder Lou Piniella, along with pitcher Ken Wright, from the Kansas City Royals in exchange for 38-year-old veteran hurler Lindy McDaniel. Piniella, 30, will remain with the Yankees for the next 16 seasons as player, manager and general manager, and win two World Series rings.
  - The Boston Red Sox and St. Louis Cardinals complete their second multi-player trade this postseason. Boston sends pitchers John Curtis, Mike Garman and Lynn McGlothen to the Cardinals for pitchers Reggie Cleveland and Diego Segui and third baseman Terry Hughes.
- December 11 – The Chicago Cubs, who have already traded Hall of Famer Ferguson Jenkins and former All-Stars Glenn Beckert and Randy Hundley, drop a bombshell on both the North and South sides of their city by dealing future Hall-of-Fame third baseman Ron Santo to the White Sox for pitchers Ken Frailing, Jim Kremmel (as a "PTBNL") and Steve Stone, and catcher Steve Swisher. Santo, 33, is a 14-year Cub mainstay, nine-time Senior Circuit All-Star and 5× winner of his league's Gold Glove Award. He smashed 337 homers in a Cub uniform.
- December 13 – The New York Yankees defy Oakland Athletics' owner Charles O. Finley's promise to block any team from hiring Dick Williams as its 1974 manager by signing the two-time World Series-winning pilot to a three-year contract. The matter will go before American League president Joe Cronin at a December 19 hearing in Boston. Williams resigned from the Athletics immediately after the club's Series-clinching victory on October 21 with two years left on his contract.
- December 20 – With only 11 days remaining before he retires as president of the American League, and only a day after he has conducted hearings on two hiring disputes, Joe Cronin issues rulings against the New York Yankees on two fronts:
  - He sides with Oakland Athletics owner Charles O. Finley in the finding that two-time World Series champion Dick Williams still has a valid contract with Oakland, and that Williams cannot sign to manage another American League team without Finley receiving compensation. The Yankees had named Williams their skipper seven days earlier, signing him to a lucrative three-year pact. Cronin's decision means that the Bombers' managerial chair is still vacant.
  - In addition, Cronin finds in favor of the Detroit Tigers in a grievance filed by the Yankees that contended that the Tigers had tampered with Ralph Houk, the Yanks' former manager who announced his resignation on September 29, then signed a three-year contract, upheld today by Cronin, to take over the Detroit squad on October 11.
- December 28 – The fate of the San Diego Padres remains in limbo. Embattled, financially strapped owner C. Arnholt Smith announces that his earlier agreement to sell the five-year-old franchise to a Washington, D.C., ownership syndicate has collapsed. As a result, the team will not move to the U.S. capital in 1974, as had been expected. Instead, Smith has accepted an offer from a Los Angeles-based group headed by Marje Lindheimer Everett, owner of the Hollywood Park Racetrack. Everett and her partners affirm they intend to keep the Padres in San Diego pending National League owners' approval of the purchase. However, it's reported that some NL owners are firmly opposed to Everett's bid because of her involvement, as an unindicted co-conspirator, in a 1969 attempt to bribe Illinois governor Otto Kerner Jr.

== Movies ==
- Bang the Drum Slowly

== Births ==
=== January ===
- January 2 – Mike Metcalfe
- January 3 – Da Rond Stovall
- January 5:
  - Fred Rath Jr.
  - Ramón Tatís
- January 8 – Mike Cameron
- January 9 – Aaron Holbert
- January 10 – Gary Rath
- January 14:
  - Troy Brohawn
- Rod Myers
- January 15:
  - Chris Cumberland
  - Wayne Gomes
- January 18 – Joe Kehoskie
- January 19 – Chris Stynes
- January 20 – Julio Santana
- January 23 – Nelson Paulino
- January 24 – Mike Glavine
- January 25 – Terrell Wade
- January 28 – Jacob Cruz
- January 29:
  - Brian Edmondson
  - Jason Schmidt
- January 30 – Bob Henley

=== February ===
- February 3 – Ryan Long
- February 4 – Chris Coste
- February 8 – Keith McDonald
- February 14 – Daniel Garibay
- February 18 – Shawn Estes
- February 22:
  - Rick Heiserman
  - Russ Johnson
- February 23 – Jason Boyd
- February 24 – Stubby Clapp

=== March ===
- March 4:
  - Brian Barber
  - Rick Eckstein
- March 5:
  - Felipe Crespo
  - Ryan Franklin
- March 6:
  - Terry Adams
  - Roberto Durán
- March 8:
  - Mark Lukasiewicz
  - Justin Thompson
- March 9:
  - Aaron Boone
  - C. J. Nitkowski
- March 12 – David Lee
- March 13 – Darío Veras
- March 14 – Robert Dodd
- March 17 – Vance Wilson
- March 18 – Raúl Chávez
- March 23 – Ramón Ortiz
- March 28 – Paul Wilson
- March 30 – Jason Dickson

=== April ===
- April 2 – Marc Kroon
- April 7 – Brett Tomko
- April 8 – Alex S. Gonzalez
- April 12 – Antonio Osuna
- April 17 – Andy Barkett
- April 18 – Brady Clark
- April 19:
  - Heath Murray
  - Willis Otáñez
- April 20:
  - Todd Hollandsworth
  - Scott Winchester
- April 21 – Kevin Brown
- April 26 – Geoff Blum

=== May ===
- May 1 – Rich Butler
- May 6:
  - Izzy Alcántara
  - Mike Kinkade
- May 14:
  - Brad Rigby
  - Anthony Shumaker
- May 21 – Tommy Davis
- May 22 – Julián Tavárez
- May 23 – Ramón Ortiz
- May 24 – Bartolo Colón
- May 25:
  - Mel Rosario
  - Todd Walker
- May 26 – Chris Latham
- May 29 – Trever Miller
- May 31 – Marty Janzen

=== June ===
- June 1 – Derek Lowe
- June 2 – Neifi Pérez
- June 3 – Robert Machado
- June 4 – David Lundquist
- June 10:
  - Julio Mañón
  - Pokey Reese
- June 19 – Yasuhiko Yabuta
- June 20 – Rickey Cradle
- June 24:
  - Kevin Hodges
  - Ryan Nye
  - Rob Ryan
- June 28:
  - Jose Flores
  - Corey Koskie
- June 29:
  - Jason Rakers
  - Pedro Valdés
- June 30 – Chan Ho Park

=== July ===
- July 4 – Jay Canizaro
- July 7:
  - José Jiménez
  - Matt Mantei
- July 18 – Antone Williamson
- July 19 – Alex Pacheco
- July 21 – Brian Buchanan
- July 22:
  - Mike Sweeney
  - Mike Thurman
- July 23 – Nomar Garciaparra
- July 24:
  - Stephen Larkin
  - Norihiro Nakamura
- July 25 – Guillermo Mota
- July 27 – Enrique Wilson

=== August ===
- August 2 – Mike Venafro
- August 3 – Blake Stein
- August 4:
  - Bob Howry
  - Eric Weaver
- August 7 – Danny Graves
- August 9 – Juan Alvarez
- August 12 – Gene Stechschulte
- August 16 – Damian Jackson
- August 17 – Adam Butler
- August 19 – Britt Reames
- August 20:
  - Todd Helton
  - José Paniagua
- August 21:
  - Mike Bovee
  - Lou Collier
  - Ismael Valdéz
- August 22 – Dusty Wathan
- August 23:
  - Casey Blake
  - Anthony Iapoce
- August 24 – Arquimedez Pozo
- August 25 – Dante Powell
- August 26 – Mark Budzinski
- August 27 – Rick Gorecki
- August 28 – Kit Pellow

=== September ===
- September 4:
  - Joe DePastino
  - Aaron Fultz
  - Brian Simmons
- September 5 – Justin Atchley
- September 7:
  - David Newhan
  - Jarrod Patterson
- September 8 – Bob Wolcott
- September 9 – Kazuhisa Ishii
- September 10 – Mike Saipe
- September 11 – Tom Davey
- September 14 – Joe Winkelsas
- September 16 – Desi Relaford
- September 18 – Mitch Meluskey
- September 24:
  - Jesse Garcia
  - Carlton Loewer

=== October ===
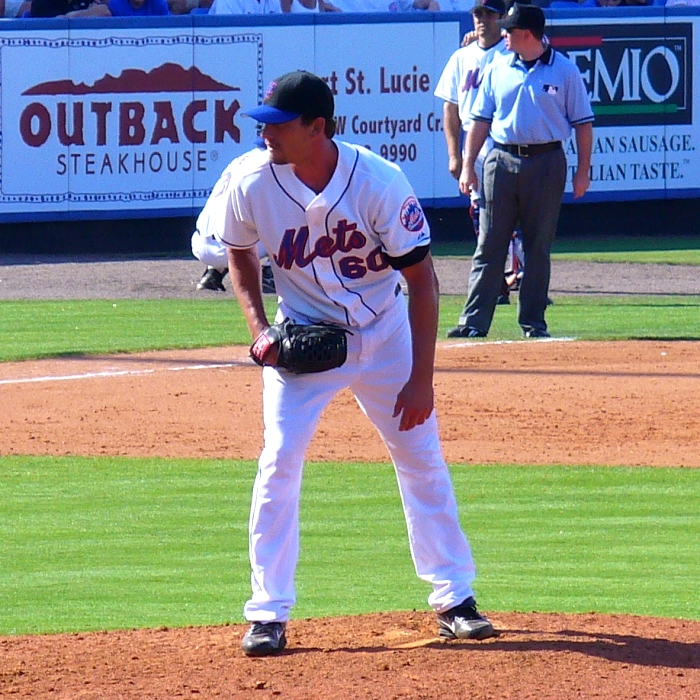
Scott Schoeneweis

- October 1 – John Thomson
- October 2 – Scott Schoeneweis
- October 3:
  - Brandon Hyde
  - Kerry Robinson
- October 5:
  - Brett Laxton
  - Luis Lopez
- October 9 – Bill Pulsipher
- October 10 – Brian Powell
- October 11 – Dmitri Young
- October 12 – Lesli Brea
- October 15:
  - David Cortés
  - Mendy López
  - Tim Young
- October 21 – Bryan Corey
- October 22 – Ichiro Suzuki
- October 24 – Mike Matthews
- October 25 – Michihiro Ogasawara
- October 27 – Jason Johnson
- October 31:
  - Tim Byrdak
  - David Dellucci

=== November ===
- November 5 – Johnny Damon
- November 6:
  - Carlos Almanzar
  - Justin Speier
- November 7 – Sean DePaula
- November 8 – Edgardo Alfonzo
- November 12 – J. D. Smart
- November 13 – Jason Simontacchi
- November 14 – Rubén Rivera
- November 15:
  - Brian Dallimore
  - Kevin Gryboski
- November 17:
  - Mickey Lopez
  - Eli Marrero
- November 20 – Brandon Kolb
- November 21:
  - Todd Erdos
  - Dan Murray
- November 22 – Ricky Ledée
- November 25 – Octavio Dotel
- November 27 – Jason Beverlin

=== December ===
- December 3 – Robert Ramsay
- December 5 – Hanley Frías
- December 7 – Brian Schmack
- December 8 – Jeff DaVanon
- December 9:
  - Tony Batista
  - Chris Truby
- December 11 – Andy Tracy
- December 19 – José Silva
- December 25 – Tarrik Brock
- December 26 – Nobuhiko Matsunaka
- December 27 – Raúl González
- December 29:
  - Theo Epstein
  - Tomás Pérez
- December 30 – Ralph Milliard

== Deaths ==
=== January ===
- January 3 – Donald Reeves, 61, All-Star outfielder and 1938 Negro American League batting champion (.384) whose pro baseball career extended from 1937 to 1941; became a teacher after retiring from the game.
- January 9:
  - Al Cypert, 83, third baseman who played one game for the Cleveland Naps on June 27, 1914; later a lawyer and politician in his native Arkansas.
  - Lyn Lary, 66, shortstop for seven MLB teams from 1929 to 1940 who led the American League in steals in 1936; member of 1932 World Series champion New York Yankees.
- January 11 – Rivington Bisland, 82, shortstop who appeared in 31 games over three seasons (1912–1914) for the Pittsburgh Pirates, St. Louis Browns and Cleveland Naps.
- January 22 – Al Halt, 82, third baseman/shortstop who played in 257 games for the 1914–1915 Brooklyn Tip-Tops of the Federal League (then labeled an "outlaw" circuit) and 1917 Cleveland Indians.
- January 23 – Ray Callahan, 81, left-hander who pitched in three games for the Cincinnati Reds in September 1915.
- January 28 – Thad Christopher, 60, who played seven seasons spanning 1936 to 1945 in the Negro leagues, primarily as an outfielder.
- January 29 – Bob Madison, 61, outfielder who played for the Kansas City Monarchs during their "barnstorming" era (1935–1936), then the 1937–1938 Memphis Red Sox and 1942 Birmingham Black Barons of the Negro American League.
- January 30 – Scotty Alcock, 87, third baseman in 54 games for the 1914 Chicago White Sox.

=== February ===
- February 8 – Roy Spencer, 72, catcher in 636 games, the bulk of them as a member of the Washington Senators (1929–1932), over a dozen seasons between 1925 and 1938.
- February 14 – Paul Johnson, 76, outfielder/pinch hitter who played in 66 games for the 1920–1921 Philadelphia Athletics.
- February 21 – Gilly Campbell, 65, lefty-swinging catcher who appeared in 295 games over five seasons for the Chicago Cubs, Cincinnati Reds and Brooklyn Dodgers between 1933 and 1938.
- February 28 – Syl Simon, 75, infielder and pinch hitter for the 1923–1924 St. Louis Browns who played in the minor leagues after losing much of his left hand in an accident.

=== March ===
- March 1 – Ray Battle, 54, third baseman for the 1944–1945 Homestead Grays of the Negro National League.
- March 11 – Ralph Shropshire, 62, catcher who played ten games for the 1937 St. Louis Stars of the Negro American League.
- March 12:
  - Jesse Altenburg, 80, outfielder who appeared in 19 games for the 1916–1917 Pittsburgh Pirates.
  - Frankie Frisch, 74, Hall of Fame second baseman for the New York Giants (1919–1926) and St. Louis Cardinals (1927–1937) who scored 100 runs seven times, led the NL in steals three times, and was the 1931 MVP; a lifetime .316 hitter, he twice batted .400 in the World Series; managed the "Gas House Gang" Cardinals to the 1934 World Series title and overall a four-time world champion as player and playing manager; helmed the Cardinals (July 25, 1933 to September 11, 1938), Pirates (1940–1946) and Chicago Cubs (June 14, 1949 to July 21, 1951); in broadcasting, he was a radio play-by-play man in Boston for the Bees and Red Sox (1939) and New York for the Giants (1947–1948), a member of the Giants' TV team in the mid-1950s, and a color man on the CBS-TV Game of the Week from 1959 to 1961.
- March 19 – Walt Leverenz, 84, pitcher for the St. Louis Browns from 1913 to 1915.
- March 22 – Bill McCorry, 85, pitcher who worked in only two games for 1909 Browns, but went on to a long baseball career, spending almost 30 years in the minors as a player and player-manager, then serving as longtime traveling secretary of the New York Yankees.
- March 26 – George Sisler, 80, Hall of Fame first baseman for the St. Louis Browns (1915–1922, 1924–1927) who was widely recognized as the best defensive player ever at that position, twice batted over .400, and hit .340 lifetime; the American League's 1922 MVP, he had a record 257 hits in 1920 and also led the league in steals four times; managed Browns from 1924 to 1926, and later served as trusted assistant to general manager Branch Rickey in Brooklyn and Pittsburgh; sons Dick and Dave had noteworthy major-league careers.
- March 28 – Cap Tyson, 70, catcher who played for the Birmingham Black Barons of the Negro American League between 1938 and 1941.

=== April ===
- April 5 – Tex Jeanes, 72, outfielder who played in 53 games during five brief MLB trials with the 1921–1922 Cleveland Indians, 1925–1926 Washington Senators and 1927 New York Giants; nephew of Tris Speaker.
- April 6 – Ernie Smith, 73, New Jersey native known as the "Kansas City Kid" for his minor-league exploits; shortstop in 24 games for 1930 Chicago White Sox.
- April 11 – George Minor, 53, outfielder who played for the Chicago American Giants and Cleveland Buckeyes of the Negro American League between 1944 and 1948.
- April 13:
  - Clarence Blethen, 79, pitcher for the Boston Red Sox and Brooklyn Dodgers between 1923 and 1929.
  - Al Hirshberg, 63, Boston-based baseball writer since 1930 and co-author, with Jimmy Piersall, of Piersall's 1955 memoir, Fear Strikes Out.
- April 17 – Vic Aldridge, 79, pitcher for the Chicago Cubs (1917–1918, 1922–1924), Pittsburgh Pirates (1925–1927) and New York Giants (1928); helped Pittsburgh win two pennants in three years; his two complete-game wins over Washington were crucial to Pirates' 1925 World Series title; two years later, absorbed a 6–2 defeat at the hands of the "Murderer's Row" New York Yankees in Game 2 of Yanks' 1927 four-game sweep.
- April 30 – Bill McColgan, 47, play-by-play announcer who, while best known for describing NFL action, was a member of the Cleveland Indians' broadcast team from 1958 to 1960.

=== May ===
- May 1 – Bobby Reis, 64, pitcher, outfielder and pinch hitter who got into 175 career games (69 as a pitcher) for the Brooklyn Dodgers and Boston Bees between 1935 and 1938; led National League in games finished in 1936.
- May 3 – Ray Perry, 53, minor-league third baseman who, despite smaller stature—5 feet 7 inches (1.70 m), 175 pounds (79 kg)—slugged at least 348 homers in his 18-year career; later a minor league manager and MLB scout.
- May 5 – Bert Griffith, 77, outfielder in 191 career games for 1921–1923 Brooklyn Robins and 1924 Washington Senators.
- May 7 – Ralph Miller, 100, pitcher who posted a 5–17 (5.15 ERA) record in 29 games for Brooklyn and Baltimore of the National League in 1898 and 1899; first centenarian among MLB players.
- May 18 – Herb Kelly, 80, southpaw who pitched in ten games for the 1914–1915 Pittsburgh Pirates.
- May 19 – Jim Moore, 69, pitcher who played from 1928 to 1932 for the Cleveland Indians and Chicago White Sox.
- May 21 – Herm Wehmeier, 46, pitcher who won 92 games in 13 seasons from 1945 to 1958, primarily spent with the Cincinnati Reds.
- May 23 – Neil Mahoney, 66, former Northeastern University catcher and Bowdoin College head baseball coach who became chief East Coast scout and then director of player procurement and development of the Boston Red Sox from 1946 until his death.
- May 26 – Nelson "Chicken" Hawks, 77, first baseman/outfielder who played in 146 career games for 1921 New York Yankees and 1925 Philadelphia Phillies.
- May 30 – Jim Breton, 81, third baseman who appeared in 109 games for the 1913–1915 Chicago White Sox.

=== June ===
- June 1 – Fred Heimach, 72, southpaw hurler who appeared in 296 career games for 1920–1926 Philadelphia Athletics, 1926 Boston Red Sox, 1928–1929 New York Yankees, and 1930–1933 Brooklyn Robins/Dodgers; member of 1928 world-champion Yankees.
- June 2 – King Bader, 85, pitcher for the 1912 New York Giants and 1917–1918 Boston Red Sox.
- June 3 – Jack Mills, 83, Harvard-educated third baseman and pinch runner who played in 13 games for the 1911 Cleveland Naps.
- June 11:
  - Bill Burwell, 78, pitcher for the St. Louis Browns in 1920–1921 and Pittsburgh Pirates in 1928; longtime minor-league manager and scout; served two terms as a Pittsburgh coach, including as pitching tutor for 1960 World Series champions.
  - Tom Padden, 64, catcher in 399 games for three MLB clubs, almost exclusively the 1932–1937 Pirates, over all or part of seven seasons.
  - Kemp Wicker, 66, left-handed pitcher for 1936–1938 New York Yankees and 1941 Brooklyn Dodgers; minor-league manager and longtime scout; member of 1937 World Series champions.
- June 12:
  - Irv Bartling, 58, infielder who played 14 games for the 1938 Philadelphia Athletics.
  - Clint Blume, 74, pitcher who appeared in 13 games during trials with the 1922 and 1923 New York Giants.
- June 14 – Fred Johnson, 79, pitcher whose 21-year professional baseball career (1921–1941) included 27 MLB games pitched for the 1922–1923 New York Giants, then, at the ages of 44 and 45, the 1938–1939 St. Louis Browns.
- June 17 – Fritz Scheeren, 81, outfielder who appeared in 15 games during two trials with the Pittsburgh Pirates (1914–1915).
- June 18 – Gerves Fagan, 57, infielder for five Negro leagues teams during 1942 and 1943.
- June 23 – Cliff Aberson, 51, two-sport athlete who was a left fielder for the Chicago Cubs from 1947 to 1949, and a halfback with Green Bay Packers in 1945.
- June 30:
  - Doc Cook, 87, New York Yankees' outfielder who appeared in 288 games from 1913 to 1916.
  - Bunny Downs, 79, infielder (1914–1929) for ten Black baseball and Negro leagues clubs; later, manager of the 1943 Cincinnati Clowns of the Negro American League.

=== July ===
- July 2:
  - Chick Hafey, 70, Hall of Fame left fielder for the St. Louis Cardinals and Cincinnati Reds, a career .316 hitter who made the first hit in All-Star history and was the first batting champion to wear eyeglasses.
  - George McBride, 92, shortstop who played primarily for the Washington Senators (1908–1920) and known for his defense; managed Senators in 1921.
- July 4 – Walter Schmidt, 86, catcher who played in 766 games over ten seasons for the Pittsburgh Pirates (1916–1924) and St. Louis Cardinals (1925).
- July 6:
  - Joe E. Brown, 81, comedian, actor (Some Like It Hot, the baseball-themed films Alibi Ike and Fireman, Save My Child, and dozens of others) and passionate fan who spent the 1953 season on the Yankees' play-by-play broadcast team; his son Joe L. was the general manager of the Pittsburgh Pirates (1955–1976, 1985).
  - Wickey McAvoy, 78, catcher who played in 235 games for the Philadelphia Athletics (1913–1915, 1917–1919).
- July 7 – Paul Musser, 84, pitcher for the Washington Senators (1912) and Boston Red Sox (1919).
- July 11 – George Edmondson, 77, pitcher who worked in a total of eight games for 1922–1924 Cleveland Indians.
- July 12 – Billy Urbanski, 70, shortstop for the Boston Braves from 1931 to 1936.
- July 17 – Evar Swanson, 70, outfielder for the Cincinnati Reds (1929–1930) and Chicago White Sox (1932–1934); swiped 33 bases in 1929—but caught stealing 20 times, which led the National League.

=== August ===
- August 7 – Wilbur Cooper, 81, first left-handed pitcher in National League history to win over 200 games (with 216 career triumphs); won 202 games for the Pittsburgh Pirates between 1912 and 1924.
- August 13:
  - Alva Jo Fischer, 46, All-American Girls Professional Baseball League pitcher and shortstop who earned inductions into several baseball halls of fame.
  - Ernest Smith, 73, outfielder/catcher who played in the Negro leagues between 1937 and 1942.
- August 14 – Claude Willoughby, 74, pitcher who spent all but nine games of his 219-game MLB career as a member of terrible Philadelphia Phillies teams (1925–1930).
- August 21 – Ira Hutchinson, 62, pitcher who appeared in 209 games for four MLB clubs, principally the Boston Bees/Braves, between 1933 and 1945; longtime minor-league manager.
- August 22 – George Cutshaw, 86, shortstop for the Brooklyn Dodgers/Superbas/Robins (1912–1917), Pittsburgh Pirates (1918–1921) and Detroit Tigers (1922–1923) who excelled on defense.
- August 27 – Herman Layne, 72, outfielder and pinch runner who appeared in 11 games for the 1927 Pirates

=== September ===
- September 5:
  - Chick Davies, 81, pitcher in 46 MLB career games for 1914–1915 Philadelphia Athletics and 1925–1926 New York Giants.
  - Jack Fournier, 83, first baseman who played 1,530 games for five teams—principally the Chicago White Sox, Brooklyn Robins and St. Louis Cardinals—in 15 seasons spanning 1912 to 1927; hit .313 lifetime and led NL in homers (with 27) in 1924; later a scout.
- September 10 – Roy Johnson, 70, outfielder of one-quarter Cherokee descent who played 1,155 Major League Baseball games for the Detroit Tigers, Boston Red Sox, New York Yankees and Boston Bees in a span of ten seasons from 1929 to 1938; led the American League in at-bats (640) and doubles (45) in a rookie season when he amassed 201 hits; later led AL with 19 triples in 1931; compiled at least a .314 batting average in four seasons and 100 or more runs three times, and earned a World Series ring with the Yankees in 1936; elder brother of Bob Johnson.
- September 11 – Del Baker, 81, catcher (1914–1916), coach (1933–1938) and manager (1938–1942) of the Detroit Tigers, who led them to the 1940 AL pennant and an overall 416–354 (.540) record as skipper; later coached for Cleveland Indians and Boston Red Sox, and served as interim manager of 1960 Red Sox.
- September 12 – Bernie Boland, 81, pitcher for the 1915–1920 Tigers and the 1921 St. Louis Browns; reached double figures in games won from 1915 to 1919.
- September 13:
  - Vince Barton, 65, Canadian outfielder who appeared in 102 games for the Chicago Cubs during the 1931 and 1932 seasons.
  - John MacLean, 52, play-by-play announcer and member of the Washington Senators' broadcast team from 1961 to 1968, then briefly #2 announcer on Boston Red Sox' radio network in 1972.
  - Johnny McCarthy, 63, first baseman who played 542 career games for Brooklyn Dodgers (1934–1935), New York Giants (1936–1941 and 1948) and Boston Braves (1943 and 1946).
- September 14:
  - René Monteagudo, 57, Cuban pitcher–outfielder for the Washington Senators (1938, 1940, 1944) and Philadelphia Phillies (1945).
  - Sloppy Thurston, 74, pitcher who won 89 games over nine seasons between 1923 and 1933 for St. Louis, Chicago and Washington of the American League, and Brooklyn of the National League.
- September 15 – Felton Wilson, 65, catcher who played for the Negro leagues' Cleveland Stars, Akron Grays and Detroit Stars during the 1930s.
- September 16 – Tom Long, 75, southpaw hurler who appeared in one MLB game, on April 26, 1924, for the Brooklyn Robins.
- September 18:
  - Dave Harris, 73, outfielder (primarily a reserve) who appeared in 542 career games over seven seasons with the Boston Braves, Chicago White Sox and Washington Senators between 1925 and 1934.
  - Doug Smith, 81, pitcher for the 1912 Boston Red Sox.
- September 20 – Jim Bishop, 75, pitcher who went 0–4 (6.39) in 22 games for 1923–1924 Philadelphia Phillies.
- September 23 – Jesse Fowler, 73, left-handed hurler who appeared in 13 games for the 1924 St. Louis Cardinals; elder brother, by over 23 years, of Art Fowler.
- September 24:
  - Tommy Nelson, 56, third baseman who played 40 games for 1945 Boston Braves.
  - Bruce Sloan, 58, backup outfielder who appeared in 59 games for 1944 New York Giants.
- September 30 – Reb Russell, 84, southpaw pitcher for the 1913–1919 Chicago White Sox who won 22 games as a rookie and 18 more in 1916; member of 1917 World Series champions but released due to a sore arm in June 1919; became an outfielder and returned to the majors for the 1922–1923 Pittsburgh Pirates, batting .323 with 165 hits in 154 games spanning those two seasons.

=== October ===
- October 8 – Raymond Haley, 82, caught from 1915 through 1917 for the Boston Red Sox and Philadelphia Athletics.
- October 12 – Jim Mattox, 76, left-handed-hitting catcher and pinch hitter who appeared in 51 games for the 1922–1923 Pittsburgh Pirates.
- October 13 – Icehouse Wilson, 61, college football star (Saint Mary's of California) whose one season of pro baseball (1934) included one game and one at bat as a pinch hitter for the Detroit Tigers on May 31.
- October 22 – Ben Van Dyke, 85, pitcher for the Philadelphia Phillies (1909) and Boston Red Sox (1912).
- October 24 – Al Brazle, 60, pitcher who won 97 games for the St. Louis Cardinals (1943 and 1946–1954), also leading the NL in saves twice; 1946 World Series champion.
- October 27:
  - Bennie Tate, 71, lefty-swinging platoon catcher for the Washington Senators, Chicago White Sox, Boston Red Sox and Chicago Cubs who played in 566 games between 1924 and 1934; member of Washington's 1924 World Series champions.
  - Eddie Yount, 57, outfielder and pinch hitter who got into nine total games in brief MLB trials with the 1937 Philadelphia Athletics and 1939 Pittsburgh Pirates.

=== November ===
- November 2 – Greasy Neale, 81, outfielder who played 768 games for the Cincinnati Reds and Philadelphia Phillies between 1916 and 1924; batted .357 in 1919 World Series to help Reds win world title; gained fame as a football coach, leading the Philadelphia Eagles to two NFL championships during the 1940s to crown a career he began to fill time between baseball seasons.
- November 3 – Harry Kenyon, 79, outfielder, pitcher and manager in the Negro leagues between 1921 and 1929.
- November 8 – Bob Chipman, 55, pitcher who spent all or part of 12 years in the National League (1941–1952) with Brooklyn, Chicago and Boston, appearing in 293 games.
- November 10 – Denver Grigsby, 72, outfielder who played 199 games for 1923–1925 Chicago Cubs.
- November 14 – Gene Bailey, 79, outfielder in 213 games for four big-league clubs, principally the Brooklyn Robins, over five seasons between 1917 and 1924.
- November 15 – Phil Todt, 72, fine defensive first baseman who played from 1924 to 1931 for the Boston Red Sox and Philadelphia Athletics.
- November 22 – T. J. Brown, 58, All-Star shortstop in the Negro leagues who played from 1939 to 1950, principally for the Memphis Red Sox.
- November 23 – Willie Mitchell, 83, southpaw hurler who pitched in 276 games for the Cleveland Naps/Indians and Detroit Tigers from 1901 to 1919.
- November 27:
  - Ed Holly, 94, shortstop who appeared in 276 games for the 1906–1907 St. Louis Cardinals and 1914–1915 Pittsburgh Rebels (Federal League).
  - Nate Moreland, 59, pitcher/outfielder for the Baltimore Elite Giants of the Negro National League during the 1940s.
- November 29 – Tom Hamilton, 48, outfielder who played in 67 games for the 1952–1953 Philadelphia Athletics; later a minor league manager and college baseball coach.
- November 30 – Alex Metzler, 70, outfielder who hit .285 with a .374 OBP in 560 games for the Philadelphia Athletics, Chicago Cubs, Chicago White Sox, and St. Louis Browns from 1925 to 1930.

=== December ===
- December 1 – Kyle "Skinny" Graham, 74, pitcher who appeared in 67 career games for the 1924–1926 Boston Braves and 1929 Detroit Tigers.
- December 3:
  - Bill Holland, 72, pitcher/outfielder who appeared in 15 seasons in the Negro leagues between 1920 and 1941.
  - James Mulvey, 74, motion picture industry executive and co-owner (with his wife, Dearie, until her 1968 death) of the Brooklyn/Los Angeles Dodgers from 1938 until his death.
- December 4 – Frank Duncan, 72, topflight defensive catcher whose playing career in the Negro leagues encompassed 22 seasons spanning 1920 to 1945.
- December 5 – Spencer Pumpelly, 80, Yale graduate who appeared in one inning as a Washington Senators' relief pitcher in his only MLB appearance on July 11, 1925.
- December 10 – Joe Riggert, 86, outfielder for four seasons in the major leagues; holds the record for career minor league triples.
