= Hideki Irabu =

Japanese baseball player (1969–2011)

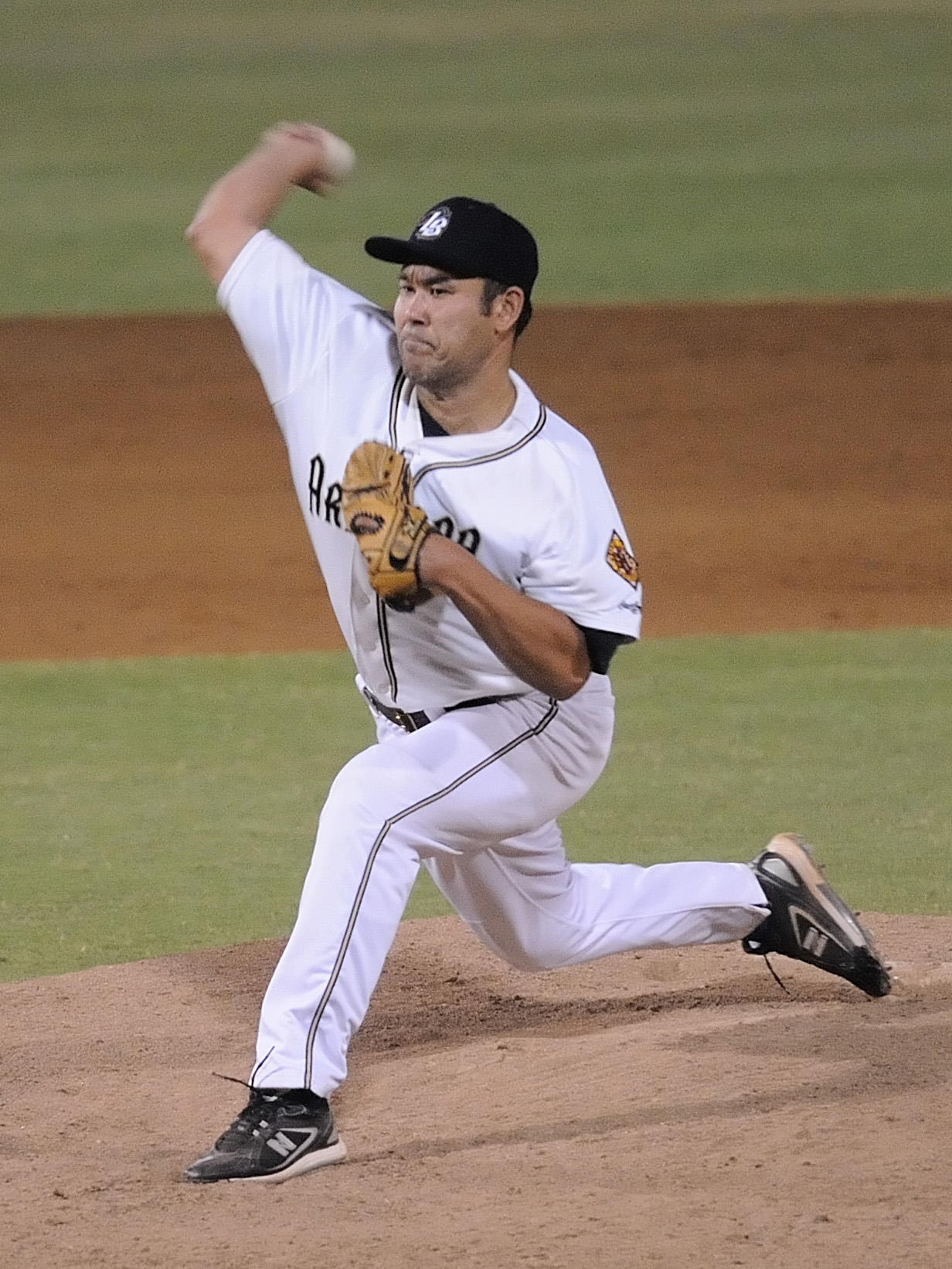
- Irabu pitching for the Long Beach Armada
- Pitcher
- Born: 5 May 1969; Hirara, Okinawa, Japan
- Died: 27 July 2011 (aged 42); Rancho Palos Verdes, California, U.S.
- Batted: Right Threw: Right

Professional debut
- NPB: 7 May, 1988, for the Lotte Orions
- MLB: 10 July, 1997, for the New York Yankees

Last appearance
- MLB: 12 July, 2002, for the Texas Rangers
- NPB: 11 June, 2004, for the Hanshin Tigers

NPB statistics
- Win–loss record: 72–69
- Earned run average: 3.55
- Strikeouts: 1,282

MLB statistics
- Win–loss record: 34–35
- Earned run average: 5.15
- Strikeouts: 405
- Stats at Baseball Reference

Teams
- Lotte Orions / Chiba Lotte Marines (1988–1996); New York Yankees (1997–1999); Montreal Expos (2000–2001); Texas Rangers (2002); Hanshin Tigers (2003–2004)

Career highlights and awards
- 2× World Series champion (1998, 1999)

Hideki Irabu (伊良部 秀輝, Irabu Hideki; 5 May 1969 – 27 July 2011) was a Japanese professional baseball player. He played professionally in both Japan and North America. Irabu played for the Lotte Orions / Chiba Lotte Marines and Hanshin Tigers of Nippon Professional Baseball (NPB) and for the New York Yankees, Montreal Expos, and Texas Rangers of Major League Baseball (MLB).

Irabu debuted in NPB in 1988 and played for the Marines through the 1996 season. Desiring to play in MLB, the Marines sold Irabu's contract to the San Diego Padres, with whom they had a working arrangement, despite Irabu's desire to play for the Yankees. When Irabu refused to play for San Diego, they traded him to the Yankees, and the aftermath of the deal led to the development of the posting system. Irabu was a member of the Yankees' World Series-winning teams in 1998 and 1999, becoming the first Japanese-born player to win a World Series.

Irabu pitched in the major leagues through 2002 and returned to Japan with the Tigers in 2003 and retired after the 2004 season. Irabu died by suicide in 2011.

== Early life ==
Irabu was born on 5 May 1969, in Hirara (present: Miyakojima), Okinawa, Japan (then administered by the government of the United States). His father was a U.S. Air Force meteorologist named Steve Thompson, married to a woman in the United States at the time. Thompson, who had been redeployed to Vietnam before his son's birth, briefly visited young Hideki and his mother a year later, but they would not again meet until after Irabu reached the U.S. major leagues. Hideki's mother, Kazue, a native of Miyako, later married a restaurateur, Ichiro Irabu, from Osaka. Irabu raised Hideki as his son in Amagasaki, Hyōgo Prefecture.

== Career ==
=== Lotte Orions / Chiba Lotte Marines ===
Irabu pitched for the Lotte Orions, who later became the Chiba Lotte Marines, of the Pacific League from 1988–1996. He was known as a high-speed pitcher and in 1993, he threw a 158 km/h (98 mph) fastball against Kazuhiro Kiyohara of the Seibu Lions. This was the fastest clocked pitch in all of Japanese Professional Baseball (NPB) until 2005, when the record was broken by Marc Kroon of the Yokohama BayStars.

Irabu led the Pacific League in wins in 1994 (15) and in ERA in 1995 and 1996 (2.53 & 2.40, respectively). He also led the Pacific League in strikeouts in 1994 and 1995 (239 & 167, respectively).

=== New York Yankees ===
In 1997, the San Diego Padres purchased Irabu's contract from the Chiba Lotte Marines. The criticisms of this sale from other MLB teams, who wished to bid on Irabu, led to the creation of the posting system currently used by Japanese and MLB teams. Irabu, however, refused to sign with the Padres, saying he would only play with the Yankees. For the negotiating rights to Irabu, the Yankees offered the Padres a choice of one from a list of players including Brian Boehringer, David Weathers, Chris Cumberland, Andy Fox and Matt Luke. The Padres eventually included him as a player-to-be-named-later in a trade that involved Homer Bush and Irabu going to the New York Yankees in exchange for Rafael Medina, Rubén Rivera, and $3 million in cash. The Yankees signed Irabu to a $12.8 million, four-year contract, and after only eight minor league appearances, the Yankees put him in their rotation.

Irabu made his highly publicized debut on 10 July 1997, drawing almost twice as many fans that night as they averaged for weeknight games. He played with the Yankees from 1997 through 1999, winning two World Series rings (1998, 1999) despite only pitching in one postseason game and having no postseason decisions. George Steinbrenner publicly expressed disgust at his weight, at one point calling him a "fat pussy toad" after he failed to cover first base on a ground ball during a spring training game in Fort Lauderdale. It was the second inning in a row that Irabu had shown a lack of hustle. Steinbrenner was so upset that refused to let Irabu accompany the team to Los Angeles, but apologized two days later and allowed Irabu to join the team.

1998 was Irabu's best season in MLB, featuring career bests in games started (28), complete games (2), innings pitched (173), wins (13), and ERA (4.06). He was referenced in the Seinfeld series finale, which aired on May 14. While inconsistent, Irabu was twice named the American League's Pitcher of the Month: in May 1998 (4–1, 1.44 ERA) and July 1999 (4–0, 2.64 ERA).

=== Montreal Expos ===
After the 1999 season, he was traded to the Montreal Expos for Ted Lilly, Christian Parker, and Jake Westbrook. He started only 14 games for the Expos in 2000 and 2001, pitching 71 1/3 innings with a 6.69 ERA and only two wins against seven losses.

=== Texas Rangers ===
In 2002, he signed as a free agent to pitch for the Texas Rangers as a closer. At the end of the year, he was released.

=== Hanshin Tigers ===
At the end of the 2002 season, Irabu moved back to Japan to pitch in the Hanshin Tigers' starting rotation for the 2003 season, helping the team win the Central League pennant for the first time since 1985.

Before the 2004 season, he pitched in the 2004 MLB Japan Opening Series exhibition games against the Tampa Bay Devil Rays.

Over the course of six MLB seasons, Irabu's career totals are 126 games, 514 innings, 34 wins, 35 losses, 16 saves, 405 strikeouts, and a 5.15 ERA. His Japanese totals for eleven seasons are 273 games, 1,286 1/3 innings, 72 wins, 69 losses, 11 saves, 1,282 strikeouts, and a 3.55 ERA.

=== Later career ===
In April 2009, Irabu came out of retirement to sign with Long Beach Armada of the independent Golden Baseball League. He posted a 5–3 record in 10 starts, with an ERA of 3.58. In 65 innings, Irabu struck out 66 batters while walking just 19. In August, he announced his intention to return to the Japanese professional leagues, and began playing for the semi-professional Kōchi Fighting Dogs.

== Later life ==
On 20 August 2008, Irabu was arrested for assaulting the manager of a bar in Umeda, Osaka after his credit card was declined.

Irabu was arrested for driving under the influence of alcohol on 17 May 2010 in Redondo Beach, California. The press release of his arrest stated he resided in the Los Angeles suburb of Rancho Palos Verdes at the time.

Irabu was found dead in his Rancho Palos Verdes home on 27 July 2011. He was reported to have hanged himself. He left behind his wife and two children. Irabu's autopsy showed he was inebriated at the time of his death, with both alcohol and Ativan in his system. He was reportedly despondent because his wife had taken their two daughters and left him.
