= Robert Madison =

Robert Madison may refer to:

- Bob Madison (baseball) (1911–1973), African-American pitcher
- Robert P. Madison (born 1923), African-American architect
- Robert B. Madison (born 1965), founder of the Kingdom of Talossa
