= 1973 Senior League World Series =

American youth baseball tournament

Tournament information
- Location: Gary, Indiana
- Dates: August 11–18, 1973

Final positions
- Champions: Taipei, Taiwan
- Runner-up: Oxon Hill, Maryland

The 1973 Senior League World Series is a baseball competition that took place from August 11–18 in Gary, Indiana, United States. Taipei, Taiwan defeated Oxon Hill, Maryland in the championship game. It was Taiwan's second straight championship.

== Teams ==
| United States | International |
|---|---|
| (Indiana) East Gary, Indiana; District 1 Host | Windsor, Ontario Canada |
| (Maryland) Oxon Hill, Maryland East | (West Germany) Wiesbaden, West Germany Europe |
| (Illinois) Clear Ridge, Illinois North | (Taiwan) Taipei, Taiwan Far East |
| (Texas) Brenham, Texas South | Saltillo, Mexico Mexico |
| (California) San Jose, California West | Río Piedras, Puerto Rico Puerto Rico |

== Results ==
Opening round

| — |
| — | Taiwan | 16 |
| — | Indiana | 1 |

| — |
| — | Puerto Rico | 3 |
| — | Mexico | 2 |

Winner's bracket

—
1–0 | Taiwan | 3
— | Maryland | 0
— | Canada | 2
— | West Germany | 1
1–0 | Puerto Rico | 2
— | California | 9
— | Texas | 4
— | Illinois | 3

—
2–0 | Taiwan | 1
1–0 | Canada | 0
1–0 | California | 1
1–0 | Texas | 4

Bracket final
3–0 | Taiwan | 11
2–0 | Texas | 0

Loser's bracket

—
0–1 | Mexico | 6
0–1 | West Germany | 4

—
0–1 | Indiana | 2
0–1 | Illinois | 7
1–1 | Puerto Rico | 14
1–1 | Mexico | 2

—
0–1 | Maryland | 8
1–1 | Illinois | 2
1–1 | California | 1
2–1 | Puerto Rico | 5

—
1–1 | Canada | 1
1–1 | Maryland | 2
2–1 | Texas | 6
3–1 | Puerto Rico | 5

Bracket Semifinal
2–1 | Maryland | 2
3–1 | Texas | 1

Elimination round

Semifinals
3–0 | Taiwan | 11
2–0 | Texas | 0
3–1 | Texas | 1
2–1 | Maryland | 2

Championship
4–0 | Taiwan | 4
3–1 | Maryland | 0

1973 Senior League World Series Champions
Taipei, Taiwan
