= Rafael Medina (baseball) =

Panamanian baseball player (born 1975)

- Pitcher
- Born: February 15, 1975 (age 51); Panama City, Panama
- Batted: Right Threw: Right

MLB debut
- April 2, 1998, for the Florida Marlins

Last MLB appearance
- September 26, 1999, for the Florida Marlins

MLB statistics
- Win–loss record: 3–7
- Earned run average: 5.96
- Strikeouts: 65
- Stats at Baseball Reference

Teams
- Florida Marlins (1998–1999)

Rafael Eduardo Medina (born February 15, 1975) is a Panamanian former professional baseball pitcher. He played for the Florida Marlins of Major League Baseball (MLB) from 1998 to 1999. He also played for the Panama national baseball team. He is the brother of former minor league pitcher Ricardo Medina.

== Career ==
Medina was originally signed by the New York Yankees as an amateur free agent in 1992. He began his professional career the following year with the Yankees' rookie team, then spent 1994 with the Oneonta Yankees, where he had a win–loss record of 3-7 and a 4.66 earned run average (ERA) in 14 games. He split 1995 with the Greensboro Bats and Tampa Yankees. With Tampa, he had a 2.37 ERA in six games. Medina was promoted to the Norwich Navigators, and had a 5-8 record, a 3.06 ERA, and 112 strikeouts in 19 games. After the 1996 season ended, he was traded to the San Diego Padres with Rubén Rivera for Hideki Irabu and Homer Bush.

Medina spent 1997 with the Las Vegas Stars, the Padres' AAA affiliate. He had a 7.56 ERA in 13 games, and scouts no longer considered him a top prospect unlike the previous season, due to the poor stats and a lack of confidence. After a season with the Padres, they traded him to the Florida Marlins with Steve Hoff and Derrek Lee for Kevin Brown. With the Marlins, he made the opening day roster, and pitched in 12 games for the team in 1998, going 2-6 with a 6.01 ERA. The Marlins then tried using Medina as a relief pitcher, and he split 1999 with Florida and the Calgary Cannons. With the major league squad he had a 5.79 ERA in 20 games.

After the season, Medina was picked up by the Atlanta Braves. He spent the next two seasons with the Syracuse SkyChiefs and the Memphis Redbirds, then spent 2002 with the Algodoneros de Torreón of the Mexican League. He spent two more seasons playing professional baseball, then joined the Panama national baseball team. He was part of the team during the 2009 World Baseball Classic, and pitched a third of an inning in one game.
