= Arizona Complex League Cubs =

- Founded in 1997; Mesa, Arizona

Team logo	Cap insignia

Minor league affiliations
- Class: Rookie
- League: Arizona Complex League
- Division: East
- Previous leagues: Arizona League (1997–2020)

Major league affiliations
- Team: Chicago Cubs

Minor league titles
- League titles (1): 1997, 2017
- Division titles (1): 2002
- First-half titles (1): 2016

Team data
- Name: ACL Cubs
- Previous names: AZL Cubs 1 & 2 (2018–2019); AZL Cubs (1997–2017)
- Ballpark: Sloan Park (2014–present)
- Previous parks: Fitch Park (1997–2013)
- Owner/ Operator: Chicago Cubs
- Manager: Dixon Machado

The Arizona Complex League Cubs are a Rookie-level affiliate of the Chicago Cubs, competing in the Arizona Complex League of Minor League Baseball. The team plays its home games at Sloan Park in Mesa, Arizona. The team is composed mainly of players who are in their first year of professional baseball either as draftees or non-drafted free agents from the United States, Canada, Dominican Republic, Venezuela, and other countries.

== History ==
The team first competed in the Arizona League (AZL) in 1997, and has been a member of the league continuously since then. During the 2018 and 2019 seasons, the team fielded two squads in the league, differentiated by suffixes (1 and 2, although some sources list them as Blue and Red). Prior to the 2021 season, the Arizona League was renamed as the Arizona Complex League (ACL).

== Year-by-year record ==
Year	Record	Finish	Manager	Playoffs
1997	34–20	1st	Terry Kennedy	League Champs
1998	29–26	3rd	Nate Oliver	
1999	18–37	8th	Carmelo Martínez	
2000	32–24	3rd	Carmelo Martínez	
2001	26–30	5th	Carmelo Martínez	
2002	35–21	1st	Carmelo Martínez	Won Playoff
2003	25–24	6th	Carmelo Martínez	
2004	27–29	6th	Trey Forkerway	
2005	19–37	9th	Steve McFarland	
2006	21–34	8th	Carmelo Martínez	
2007	27–29	6th	Ricardo Medina	
2008	31–24	5th	Franklin Font	
2009	29–27	4th	Juan Cabreja	
2010	26–29	8th	Juan Cabreja	
2011	28–28	6th (tie)	Juan Cabreja	
2012	37–19	2nd	Bobby Mitchell	
2013	27–28	8th	Bobby Mitchell	
2014	22–34	12th	Jimmy Gonzalez	
2015	31–22	2nd	Carmelo Martínez	
2016	28–28	9th	Carmelo Martínez	
2017	25–31	11th (tie)	Carmelo Martínez	
2018				
2019				
2020	Season canceled			

== Top player stats ==
Cubs Team and top Hitter and Pitcher statistics

Team				Individual						
Year	BA	ERA	Fld	Hitter	AB	Hits	Avr	Pitcher	W–L	ERA
1997	.262	3.43	.941	Brad Ramsey	200	63	.315	Todd Noel	5–1	1.98
1998	.262	4.59	.947	Jason Clarke	140	48	.343	Yonder Linares	7–2	2.89
1999	.261	5.52	.946	Adam Morrissey	169	50	.296	Dan Wiggens	3–0	2.91
2000	.296	4.93	.945	Syketo Anderson	150	58	.387	Andrew Earley	2–0	4.00
2001	.268	4.51	.946	Ronny Cedeño	206	72	.350	Félix Sánchez	2–5	3.98
2002	.279	3.69	.958	Matt Creighton	169	61	.361	Justin Jones	3–1	1.80
2003	.276	4.73	.949	Ryan Fitzgerald	202	77	.381	Ronald Bay	7–1	2.48
2004	.263	4.11	.956	Carlos Quinones	216	68	.315	Jose F. Ortiz	4–1	4.15
2005	.275	4.50	.953	D.J. Lewis	174	56	.322	Jose Pena	3–5	4.75
2006	.240	4.56	NA	Clifford Anderson	157	39	.248	Taylor Parker	2–2	2.33
2007	.275	4.15	.951	Jovan Rosa	144	49	.340	Michael Bunton	4–3	2.79

== Roster ==
Arizona Complex League Cubs roster
Players	Coaches/Other
Pitchers: 98 Cristopher Aranguren; -- Aaron Bummer; 82 Kaemyn Franklin; -- Anhuar Garcia ‡; 79 Luis Ghisays; 98 Yoendris Gonzalez #; 55 Ryan Jensen; 59 Zac Leigh; 65 Yander Maria; 90 Luis Mata; 46 Brody McCullough #; 81 Lazaro Mena; 84 Chaily Ramirez; 37 Eriandys Ramon; 83 Ariel Ramos; 75 Luis A. Reyes; 51 Freddy Rodriguez; 52 Jose Romero #; 50 Luis Rujano; 73 Jubrayker Salaya; 76 Julio Valdez; 58 Geovanny Vasquez; 40 Jaxon Wiggins #; 62 Victor Zarraga; Catchers: 7 Daniel Campos; 5 Ivan Cespedes; Infielders: 15 Juan Cabada; 11 Fernando Cruz; 70 Jose Silva; 18 Juan Tomas; 13 Leonel Vivas; Outfielders: 20 Derik Alcantara; 16 Freiker Betencourt; 24 Ethan Conrad; 29 Joan Delgado; 28 Cesar Lugo; 39 Robin Ortiz; 21 Jeury Ramirez; 25 Jan Luis Reyes; 27 Kotaru Tsunematsu	Manager: 49 Dixon Machado; Coaches: 38 Pablo Arevalo (pitching); 15 Cody Dennis (development); 16 Mario Fernandez (pitching); 27 Marco Romero (hitting); 7 Demetrius Sims (development); 52 Grant Zawadzki (hitting); 60-day injured list: -- Colton Book; 96 Darian Rivero; 7-day injured list; * On Chicago Cubs 40-man roster; ~ Development list; # Rehab assignment; ∞ Reserve list; ‡ Restricted list; § Suspended list; † Temporarily inactive list; Roster updated June 17, 2026; Transactions; → More rosters: MiLB • Arizona Complex League; → Chicago Cubs minor league players
