= Homer Bush =

American baseball player (born 1972)

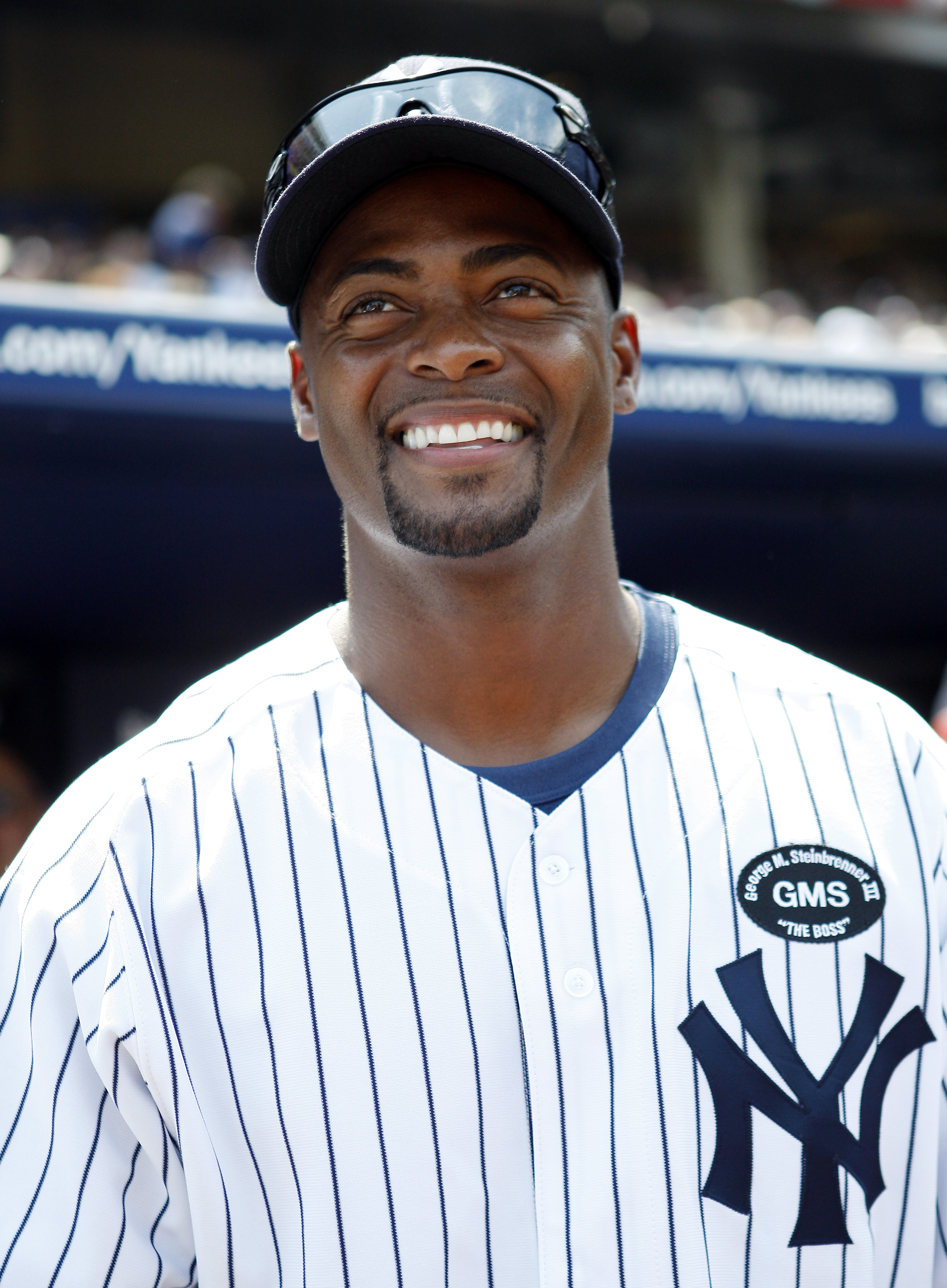
- Bush at Old-Timer's Day in 2010
- Second baseman / Manager
- Born: November 12, 1972 (age 53); East St. Louis, Illinois, U.S.
- Batted: Right Threw: Right

MLB debut
- August 16, 1997, for the New York Yankees

Last MLB appearance
- June 8, 2004, for the New York Yankees

MLB statistics
- Batting average: .285
- Home runs: 11
- Runs batted in: 115
- Stats at Baseball Reference

Teams
- New York Yankees (1997–1998); Toronto Blue Jays (1999–2002); Florida Marlins (2002); New York Yankees (2004)

Career highlights and awards
- World Series champion (1998)

Homer Giles Bush (born November 12, 1972) is an American former professional baseball second baseman. He played for the New York Yankees, Toronto Blue Jays and Florida Marlins of Major League Baseball from 1997 to 2002 and in 2004. He was a part of the Yankees' 1998 World Series championship over the San Diego Padres.

== High school football star ==
Bush attended East St. Louis High School in East St. Louis, Illinois, and was a standout wide receiver. He is mentioned periodically in a book titled The Right Kind Of Heroes, written by Kevin Horrigan. The book details Coach Bob Shannon and the remarkable success of the East St. Louis Flyers football program in 1989 and 1990. Throughout the book, Bush is referenced as the team's "go to" player, as well as a likeable person.

Bush still holds the Illinois State High School football records for most touchdowns scored in a single season and most receiving yards in a single season. He was also named to the All-Century team for Illinois High School Football.

Bush was recruited by the University of Missouri to play receiver following his high school football career, but opted to pursue baseball as a career.

== Early baseball years ==
The San Diego Padres selected Bush in the seventh round of the 1991 Major League Baseball draft. His first year in the minor leagues he batted .323 with the Arizona Padres of the Rookie-level Arizona League. After batting only .234 in 1992 for the Charleston Rainbows of the Class A South Atlantic League, he batted .322 with 39 stolen bases in 1993 for the Waterloo Diamonds of the Class A Midwest League winning Minor League Player of the Year for the Padres organization. In winter baseball, he played in Australia, hitting .364 and winning the batting title and being named the league MVP. In 1994, Bush split his time between the Rancho Cucamonga Quakes of the Class A-Advanced California League, where he hit .335, and the Wichita Wranglers of the Class AA Texas League, where he hit .298. He then spent that off-season in the Australian Baseball League with the Brisbane Bandits. In 1995, Bush hit .280 with 34 stolen bases for the Memphis Chicks of the Class AA Southern League, the Padres' new Class AA affiliate. Bush was promoted to the Las Vegas Stars of the Class AAA Pacific Coast League in 1996, hitting .362 before suffering a broken leg that ended his season.

In 1997, the Padres traded Bush along with pitcher Hideki Irabu to the New York Yankees for outfielder Rubén Rivera and pitcher Rafael Medina. Bush split time between the Columbus Clippers of the Class AAA International League and the New York Yankees. Bush hit .364 in 11 at-bats with the big league club.

== Major league years ==
Bush made the major league roster with the New York Yankees in 1998, and was part of the team's 1998 World Series championship. During the regular season, he batted .380 and stole six bases in only 45 games. After the 1998 season, Bush was traded to the Toronto Blue Jays, along with pitchers Graeme Lloyd and David Wells, for pitcher Roger Clemens.

Bush played in Toronto from 1999 until 2002. His standout season was in 1999, when he batted .320 and stole 32 bases. Bush was limited by hip injuries in 2000 and batted only .215. He rebounded in 2001, hitting .306. Overall, Bush averaged .283 in his years in Toronto. After being released early in 2002 by the Blue Jays, he was signed by the Florida Marlins, where he finished the season. Bush did not play in 2003 because of hip injuries. In 2004, the New York Yankees signed a now-healthy Bush, but he saw limited playing time. The Yankees invited him to their spring training in 2005. Due to his recurring hip injuries, however, Bush voluntarily left spring training and retired.

== Post-playing career ==
After he retired, Bush became a financial analyst for Merrill Lynch. He left the field after the Great Recession. In 2014, he became the hitting coach for the Eugene Emeralds. In 2016, the Texas Rangers hired Bush to be their director of youth baseball programs.

In 2022, Bush was named as the manager of the Mahoning Valley Scrappers of the MLB Draft League. In 2023, he became the new manager for the Staten Island FerryHawks of the Atlantic League of Professional Baseball.

== Personal life ==
Bush and his wife, Monica, have two children, Jailyn and Homer Jr., and live in Southlake, Texas. Homer Jr. was the Padres' 4th round pick in 2023.

== Writings ==
- Hitting Low in the Zone: A New Baseball Paradigm TN, Paige1Publishing 2015 ISBN 978-1-937250-77-5
