= Ricardo Medina =

Panamanian baseball player and manager

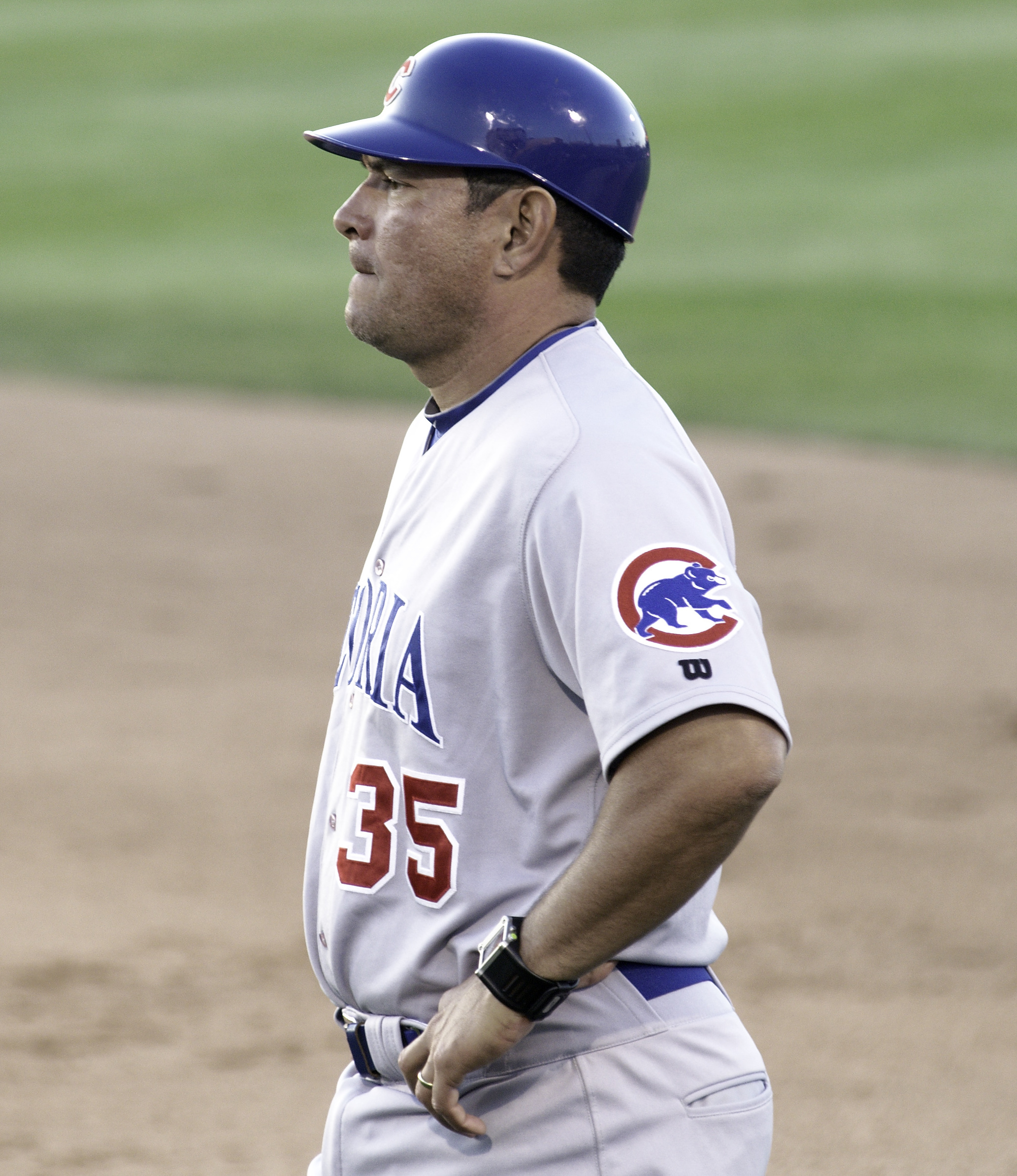
- Medina with the Peoria Chiefs in 2011
- First baseman / Coach
- Born: November 4, 1971 (age 54); Panama City, Panama
- Bats: Right Throws: Right
- Stats at Baseball Reference

Ricardo Medina DeLeon (born November 4, 1971) is a Panamanian former minor league baseball player and manager. He has also coached for Panama in multiple international events, including the 2009 World Baseball Classic. He is the brother of former Major League Baseball pitcher Rafael Medina.

== Playing career ==
Medina was a corner infielder who played in the Chicago Cubs organization from 1989 to 1994. He began his professional career with the Wytheville Cubs in 1989, playing in 51 games and hitting .264 in 163 at-bats. In 1990, he played 41 games for the Geneva Cubs, hitting .222 in 90 at-bats. He split the 1991 season between Geneva and the Peoria Chiefs, hitting a combined .292 in 73 games.

He spent both 1992 and 1993 with Peoria. In the former season, he hit .263 with five home runs and five stolen bases in 457 at-bats. He also had 60 walks and only 58 strikeouts. In the latter season, he hit .254 with no stolen bases, although he attempted to steal five times. That year, he had 40 walks and only 37 strikeouts. He played his final season in 1994 with the Daytona Cubs, hitting .226 in 54 games.

Overall, Medina hit .261 in his six year minor league career. In 432 games, he had 17 home runs and 71 doubles.

== Coaching career ==
In 2006, Medina was hired as manager of the Caimanes de Barranquilla in the Colombian Professional Baseball League. The following year, he Medina managed the Arizona League Cubs to a 27-29 record, which placed them sixth in the league. After a stint as the assistant coach of the Tennessee Smokies, Medina became hitting coach of the South Bend Cubs in early 2018.

Medina coached for the Pericos de Puebla of the Mexican League during the 2025 season. On October 30, 2025, Medina was fired by the Pericos.

== International competition coaching ==
Medina coached for Panama in the 2007 Baseball World Cup and in the 2009 World Baseball Classic.
