= Carmelo Martínez =

Puerto Rican baseball player (born 1960)

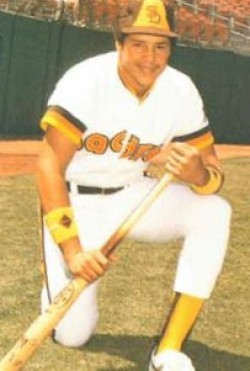
- Left fielder / First baseman / Coach
- Born: July 28, 1960 (age 66); Dorado, Puerto Rico
- Batted: Right Threw: Right

Professional debut
- MLB: August 22, 1983, for the Chicago Cubs
- NPB: 1992, for the Orix BlueWave

Last appearance
- MLB: October 2, 1991, for the Cincinnati Reds
- NPB: 1992, for the Orix BlueWave

MLB statistics
- Batting average: .245
- Home runs: 108
- Runs batted in: 424

NPB statistics
- Batting average: .227
- Home runs: 6
- Runs batted in: 23
- Stats at Baseball Reference

Teams
- Chicago Cubs (1983); San Diego Padres (1984–1989); Philadelphia Phillies (1990); Pittsburgh Pirates (1990–1991); Kansas City Royals (1991); Cincinnati Reds (1991); Orix BlueWave (1992)

Member of the Caribbean

Baseball Hall of Fame
- Induction: 2004

Carmelo Martínez Salgado (born July 28, 1960) is a Puerto Rican former professional baseball left fielder, first baseman, and coach. He played all or part of nine seasons in Major League Baseball (MLB), primarily as a first baseman and outfielder, from 1983 to 1991. He also played one season in Nippon Professional Baseball (NPB) for the Orix BlueWave in 1992. He is the cousin of Edgar Martínez.

== Playing career ==
On August 22, 1983, Martínez hit a home run in his very first major league at-bat for the Cubs. The homer came off Cincinnati's Frank Pastore in the 5th inning at Wrigley Field.

On December 7, 1983, Martínez was traded by the Cubs along with Craig Lefferts and Fritzie Connally to the San Diego Padres in exchange for pitcher Scott Sanderson. He and Kevin McReynolds were dubbed the M&M Boys on the 1984 San Diego Padres team that reached the first World Series in franchise history. Martínez had 66 RBI, while McReynolds shared the team lead with 20 home runs.

== Coaching career ==
=== Chicago Cubs ===
On July 25, 2008, Martínez was involved in a minor league brawl while serving as interim manager of the Chicago Cubs' Single-A affiliate, the Peoria Chiefs. He approached Donnie Scott, manager of the Dayton Dragons, and engaged in a heated discussion before shoving him, resulting in emptied benches.

Martínez later served as the manager of the rookie-level Arizona League Cubs.

Prior to the 2019 Caribbean Series, Martínez was named manager of the Cangrejeros de Santurce after his predecessor Ramón Vázquez quit minutes after winning the LBPRC title.

=== Algodoneros de Unión Laguna ===
On July 20, 2025, Martínez was named as the interim manager for the Algodoneros de Unión Laguna of the Mexican League, replacing José Molina. The next day, he reverted to the team's coaching staff after José Offerman was named manager. On October 7, Martínez was fired by the Algodoneros.

== See also ==
- List of Major League Baseball players from Puerto Rico
