= Felton Wilson =

American baseball player (1908-1973)

- Catcher
- Born: April 24, 1908; Talladega County, Alabama, U.S.
- Died: September 15, 1973 (aged 65); Detroit, Michigan, U.S.
- Batted: Unknown Threw: Right

Negro league baseball debut
- 1932, for the Cleveland Stars

Last appearance
- 1937, for the Detroit Stars

East–West League, Negro National League II & Negro American League statistics
- Batting average: .250
- Home runs: 1
- Runs batted in: 6

Teams
- Cleveland Stars (1932); Akron Grays (1933); Detroit Stars (1937)

Felton Wilson (April 24, 1908 – September 15, 1973) was an American professional baseball catcher in the Negro leagues in the 1930s.

A native of Talladega County, Alabama, Wilson made his Negro league debut with the Cleveland Stars in 1932. He played for the Akron Grays the following season, and finished his career in 1937 with the Detroit Stars. Wilson died in Detroit, Michigan in 1973 at age 65.
