= Chris Cumberland =

- Pitcher
- Born: January 15, 1973 (age 53); Clearwater, Florida, U.S.
- Bats: Right Throws: Left
- Stats at Baseball Reference

Teams
- Hiroshima Toyo Carp (2000)

Christopher Mark Cumberland (born January 15, 1973) is an American former professional baseball pitcher who played professionally from 1993 to 2004.

Cumberland was drafted by the New York Yankees in the 48th round of the 1992 Major League Baseball draft. He played in the Yankees' minor league system from 1993 until 1997. He played for several organizations after leaving the Yankees including the Minnesota Twins, Boston Red Sox, San Francisco Giants, Atlanta Braves, Toronto Blue Jays. San Diego Padres, and Kansas City Royals. He also played in Japan for the Hiroshima Toyo Carp in the Central League in 2000 and the Long Island Ducks of the Atlantic League in 2002.
