= Bob Madison (baseball) =

American baseball player

- Pitcher
- Born: March 8, 1911; Lillie, Louisiana, U.S.
- Died: January 29, 1973 (aged 61); San Diego, California, U.S.

Negro league baseball debut
- 1935, for the Kansas City Monarchs

Last appearance
- 1942, for the Birmingham Black Barons

Teams
- Kansas City Monarchs (1935–1936); Memphis Red Sox (1937–1938); Birmingham Black Barons (1942)

Robert Lee Madison (March 8, 1911 – January 29, 1973) was an American Negro league pitcher between 1935 and 1942.

A native of Lillie, Louisiana, Madison made his Negro leagues debut in 1935 for the Kansas City Monarchs. He went on to play for the Memphis Red Sox and Birmingham Black Barons. Madison died in San Diego, California in 1973 at age 61.
