= List of Midwest League team rosters =

Each of the 12 teams of Minor League Baseball's Midwest League carry a 30-man active roster. Only these players are eligible to play.

Teams may have any number of inactive players on their rosters at a given time who do not count toward active roster limits. Injured players may be placed on the injured list (7-day or 60-day). The temporary inactive list and bereavement list are for players attending to personal matters. Major league players may be placed on rosters for injury rehabilitation for a maximum of 20 days for non-pitchers and 30 days for pitchers.

Players who are ineligible to play due to failure to adhere to the Minor League Drug Prevention and Treatment Program, violations of their contract, who are receiving team disciplinary action, or who are unable to join the team due to visa problems may be placed on the restricted or suspended lists. These players count against a team's active roster limit.

Each team usually has a three-man coaching staff including a manager, hitting coach, and pitching coach. Depending on each Major League Baseball organization's development approach, some teams may have additional coaches.

== East Division ==
=== Dayton Dragons ===
Dayton Dragons roster
Players	Coaches/Other
Pitchers: 29 Cody Adcock; 35 Beau Blanchard; 31 Reynardo Cruz; 24 Victor Diaz; 33 Jacob Edwards; 8 Luke Hayden; 21 Trent Hodgdon; 22 Jonah Hurney; 26 Brody Jessee; 17 Nestor Lorant; 11 JeanPierre Ortiz; 28 Graham Osman; 34 Drew Pestka; 40 Ovis Portes; 18 Stephen Quigley; 20 Jimmy Romano; 27 Cole Schoenwetter; 32 Dylan Simmons; Catchers: 16 Alfredo Duno; 12 John Michael Faile; Infielders: 38 Victor Acosta; 2 Alfredo Alcantara; 5 Johnny Ascanio; 15 Carter Graham; 23 Jack Moss; 7 Carlos Sanchez; 10 Peyton Stovall; Outfielders: 14 Ariel Almonte; 9 Yerlin Confidan; 13 Esmith Pineda; 3 Kien Vu	Manager: 4 Julio Morillo; Coaches: 19 Willie Blair (pitching); 32 Troy Gingrich (hitting); 44 Gustavo Molina (coach); 25 Eric Richardson (coach); 60-day injured list: -- Ricky Cabrera; -- Anthony Stephan (Full Season); -- Logan Tanner; 7-day injured list; * On Cincinnati Reds 40-man roster; ~ Development list; # Rehab assignment; ∞ Reserve list; ‡ Restricted list; § Suspended list; † Temporarily inactive list; Roster updated May 7, 2026; Transactions; → More rosters: MiLB • Midwest League; → Cincinnati Reds minor league players

=== Fort Wayne TinCaps ===
Fort Wayne TinCaps roster
Players	Coaches/Other
Pitchers: 27 Clark Candiotti; 11 Javier Chacon; -- Jaxon Dalena; 16 Clay Edmondson; 32 Luis Germán; 41 Igor Gil; 22 Jamie Hitt; 10 Isaiah Lowe; 20 Kash Mayfield; 36 Maikel Miralles; 44 Carson Montgomery; 17 Kleiber Olmedo; 26 Abraham Parra; 28 Braian Salazar; 40 Will Varmette; 18 Jeferson Villabona; 36 Matthew Watson; 21 C.J. Widger; Catchers: 24 Lamar King Jr.; 3 Oswaldo Linares; 7 Carlos Rodriguez; Infielders: 8 Jack Costello; 14 Zach Evans; 4 Dylan Grego; 15 Jonathan Vastine; 1 Rosman Verdugo; Outfielders: 43 Jake Cunningham; 45 Alex McCoy; 25 Kavares Tears; 9 Kasen Wells	Manager: 5 Jon Mathews; Coaches: 29 Yorman Bazardo (pitching); 50 Jerry Downs (hitting); 2 Luis Mendez (bench); 60-day injured list: 22 Kannon Kemp; -- Tyler Morgan; 7-day injured list; * On San Diego Padres 40-man roster; ~ Development list; # Rehab assignment; ∞ Reserve list; ‡ Restricted list; § Suspended list; † Temporarily inactive list; Roster updated May 5, 2026; Transactions; → More rosters: MiLB • Midwest League; → San Diego Padres minor league players

=== Great Lakes Loons ===
Great Lakes Loons roster
Players	Coaches/Other
Pitchers: 34 Brooks Auger; 41 Justin Chambers; 20 Davis Chastain; 8 Nicolas Cruz; 11 Dilan Figueredo; 30 Aidan Foeller; 45 Jacob Frost; 1 Joseilyn Gonzalez; 19 Matt Lanzendorfer; 5 Alex Makarewich; 27 Accimias Morales; 25 Cody Morse; 9 Sterling Patick; 33 Zach Root; 35 Logan Tabling; 14 Jakob Wright; 15 Reynaldo Yean; 7 Christian Zazueta; Catchers: 36 Gio Cueto; 44 Jesus Galiz; 51 Victor Rodrigues; Infielders: 16 Cameron Decker; 13 Eduardo Guerrero; 36 Jose D. Hernandez; 3 Jose Izarra; -- Sam Mongelli; 22 Samuel Munoz; 21 Nico Perez; 12 Jordan Thompson; 23 Logan Wagner; Outfielders: 6 Charles Davalan; 20 Jose Meza; 46 Eduardo Quintero; 17 Mike Sirota	Manager: 18 Jair Fernandez; Coaches: 19 Brandon Bailey (pitching); 10 Jose Capellan (bullpen catcher); 31 Richard De Los Santos (pitching); 26 Kupono Decker (development); 37 Marco Hernandez (bench); 24 Kevin Lachance (hitting); -- Walter Lindo (performance); 60-day injured list: -- Ryan Brown; -- Noah Ruen; 7-day injured list; * On Los Angeles Dodgers 40-man roster; ~ Development list; # Rehab assignment; ∞ Reserve list; ‡ Restricted list; § Suspended list; † Temporarily inactive list; Roster updated May 13, 2026; Transactions; → More rosters: MiLB • Midwest League; → Los Angeles Dodgers minor league players

=== Lake County Captains ===
Lake County Captains roster
Players	Coaches/Other
Pitchers: 38 Braylon Doughty; 32 Luis Flores; 30 Jogly Garcia; 41 Franklin Gómez; 44 Melkis Hernández; 33 Jackson Humphries; 31 Michael Kennedy; 12 Izaak Martinez; 40 Xavier Martinez; 36 Logun McGuire; 22 Rafe Schlesinger; 39 Cam Schuelke; 46 Kendeglys Virguez; 47 Cameron Walty; 34 Donovan Zsak; Catchers: 15 Logun Clark; 16 Bennett Thompson; Infielders: 11 Dean Curley; 23 Luke Hill; 10 Garrett Howe; 0 Jeffrey Mercedes; 2 Kevin Rivas; 24 Nolan Schubart; Outfielders: 27 Ryan Cesarini; 9 Esteban González; 6 Tommy Hawke; 17 Jace LaViolette; 26 Aaron Walton	Manager: 29 Omir Santos; Coaches: -- Bryce Ball (hitting); 4 Ian Forster (hitting); 13 Jonathan Lopez (development); 37 Shane McCarthy (pitching); 8 Eric Stamets (bench); 60-day injured list: -- Josh Harlow; -- Kyle Scott; -- Anthony Silva; -- Conner Whittaker; 7-day injured list; * On Cleveland Guardians 40-man roster; ~ Development list; # Rehab assignment; ∞ Reserve list; ‡ Restricted list; § Suspended list; † Temporarily inactive list; Roster updated May 12, 2026; Transactions; → More rosters: MiLB • Midwest League; → Cleveland Guardians minor league players

=== Lansing Lugnuts ===
Lansing Lugnuts roster
Players	Coaches/Other
Pitchers: 21 Ryan Brown; 43 Luis Carrasco; 16 Nathan Dettmer; 13 Jose Dicochea; 17 Samuel Dutton; 23 Steven Echavarria; 45 Jake Garland; 18 Riley Huge; 32 Ryan Magdic; 34 Jack Mahoney; 30 Jorge Marcheco; 25 Abel Mercedes; 29 Tucker Novotny; 28 Darlin Pinales; 26 Kyle Robinson; 20 Gerlin Rosario; 10 Tzu-Chen Sha; 33 Zane Taylor; Catchers: 2 Dylan Fien; 27 Carlos Franco; Infielders: 11 Ali Camarillo; 8 Gunner Gouldsmith; 9 Myles Naylor; 7 C.J. Pittaro; 1 Justin Riemer; 5 Casey Yamauchi; Outfielders: 24 Rodney Green Jr.; 14 Nate Nankil; 6 Pedro Pineda; 4 Devin Taylor	Manager: 19 Javier Goddard; Coaches: 12 Luis Baez (hitting); 15 Levi Kelly (pitching); 40 Ron Witmeyer (hitting); 7-day injured list; * On Athletics 40-man roster; ~ Development list; # Rehab assignment; ∞ Reserve list; ‡ Restricted list; § Suspended list; † Temporarily inactive list; Roster updated May 12, 2026; Transactions; → More rosters: MiLB • Midwest League; → Athletics minor league players

=== West Michigan Whitecaps ===
West Michigan Whitecaps roster
Players	Coaches/Other
Pitchers: 17 Max Alba #; 29 Logan Berrier; 39 Thomas Bruss; 31 Rayner Castillo; 45 Seth Chavez; 20 Lucas Elissalt; 32 Jalen Evans; 19 Ryan Harvey; 18 Duque Hebbert; 5 Ben Jacobs; 36 Carlos Lequerica; 16 Carlos Marcano; 27 Hayden Minton; 21 Inohan Paniagua; 37 Gabriel Reyes; 28 Ethan Sloan; 40 Luke Stofel; 35 CJ Weins; Catchers: 25 Clayton Campbell; 24 Ricardo Hurtado; 7 Luke Shliger; Infielders: 1 Samuel Gil; 6 Woody Hadeen; 14 Juan Hernandez; 33 Garrett Pennington; 2 Bryce Rainer; 8 Cristian Santana; 4 Junior Tilien; Outfielders: 11 Roberto Campos; -- Nick Dumesnil; 12 Patrick Lee; 9 Nolan McCarthy; 23 Caleb Shpur; 26 Andrew Sojka; 13 Jackson Strong	Manager: 44 René Rivera; Coaches: 30 Matt Malott (hitting); 43 Daniel Ricabal (pitching); 10 Cole Roberts (bench); 60-day injured list: -- Antonio Florido; 15 Stephen Hrustich; 7-day injured list; * On Detroit Tigers 40-man roster; ~ Development list; # Rehab assignment; ∞ Reserve list; ‡ Restricted list; § Suspended list; † Temporarily inactive list; Roster updated May 12, 2026; Transactions; → More rosters: MiLB • Midwest League; → Detroit Tigers minor league players

== West Division ==
=== Beloit Sky Carp ===
Beloit Sky Carp roster
Players	Coaches/Other
Pitchers: 22 Cade Austin; 27 Nick Brink; 17 Hayden Cuthbertson; 38 Juan De La Cruz; 36 Eliazar Dishmey; 11 Peyton Fosher; 23 Holt Jones; 10 Carson Laws; 28 Liomar Martinez; 24 Aiden May; 19 Brayan Mendoza; 29 Noble Meyer; 31 Nate Payne; 39 Michael Perez; 26 Cannon Pickell; 15 Juan Reynoso; 30 Justin Storm; 39 Mason Vinyard; 37 Joey Volini; Catchers: 35 Connor Caskanette; 20 Nestor Rios; 18 Wilson Weber; Infielders: 34 Aiva Arquette; 6 Starlyn Caba; 12 Cam Clayton; 22 Drew Faurot; 14 Jesus Hernandez; 5 Chase Jaworsky; 7 Wilfredo Lara; 9 Juan Matheus; 4 Jake McCutcheon; 8 Cody Schrier; Outfielders: 4 Cam Cannarella; 25 Brandon Compton; 3 Dillon Head; 33 Jacob Jenkins-Cowart; 32 Colby Shade	Manager: 1 Angel Espada; Coaches: -- Bobby Dorta (assistant); 41 Jason Erickson (pitching); 43 Josh Glenn (defensive); -- Michael Ryan (hitting); 60-day injured list: 39 Xavier Cardenas III; 39 Luke Lashutka; 18 Nick Maldonado (full season); 13 Micah McDowell; 38 Emmett Olson; -- Franklin Sanchez; 7-day injured list; * On Miami Marlins 40-man roster; ~ Development list; # Rehab assignment; ∞ Reserve list; ‡ Restricted list; § Suspended list; † Temporarily inactive list; Roster updated May 12, 2026; Transactions; → More rosters: MiLB • Midwest League; → Miami Marlins minor league players

=== Cedar Rapids Kernels ===
Cedar Rapids Kernels roster
Players	Coaches/Other
Pitchers: 43 Christian Becerra; 30 Miguelangel Boadas; 30 Adrian Bohorquez; -- Michael Carpenter; 44 Jason Doktorczyk; 32 Adam Falinski; 2 Dasan Hill; -- Garrett Horn; 41 Paulshawn Pasqualotto; 25 Cole Peschl; 51 Riley Quick; 50 Sam Rochard; 19 Ivran Romero; 31 Michael Ross; 38 Yehizon Sanchez; 26 Nolan Santos; -- Charlee Soto; 21 Eston Stull; 45 Nick Trabacchi; Catchers: 4 Khadim Diaw; 23 Luis Hernandez; 27 Eduardo Tait; Infielders: 1 Miguel Briceno; 8 Danny De Andrade; 24 Rayne Doncon; 12 Marek Houston; 33 Andy Lugo; 11 Jay Thomason; Outfielders: 13 Jaime Ferrer; 5 Caden Kendle; 15 Jacob McCombs; 17 Yasser Mercedes; 9 Brandon Winokur	Manager: 16 Brian Meyer; Coaches: 22 Erick Julio (pitching); 49 Danny Marcuzzo (hitting); 20 Yeison Perez (hitting); 18 Hunter Townsend (pitching); 60-day injured list: 30 Ross Dunn; 23 Tanner Hall (full season); 7-day injured list; * On Minnesota Twins 40-man roster; ~ Development list; # Rehab assignment; ∞ Reserve list; ‡ Restricted list; § Suspended list; † Temporarily inactive list; Roster updated May 12, 2026; Transactions; → More rosters: MiLB • Midwest League; → Minnesota Twins minor league players

=== Peoria Chiefs ===
Peoria Chiefs roster
Players	Coaches/Other
Pitchers: 33 Blake Aita; 52 Sam Broderson; 22 D.J. Carpenter; -- José Davila; 13 Nate Dohm; 35 Yhoiker Fajardo; 21 Tanner Franklin; 27 Dominic Freeberger; 15 Patrick Galle; 26 Aaron Holiday; 53 Rubén Menes; 50 Bobby Olsen; 28 Jawilme Ramírez; 49 Gerardo Salas; 16 Jason Savacool; 36 Leonel Sequera; 54 Nolan Sparks; -- Zeke Wood ‡; 19 Christian Worley; Catchers: 12 Sammy Hernandez; 41 Josh Kross; Infielders: 5 Jesús Báez; 51 Anyelo Encarnación; 29 Jalin Flores; 34 Jack Gurevitch; 11 Christian Martin; 30 Cade McGee; 4 Tre Richardson III; Outfielders: 3 Won-Bin Cho; 8 Jose Cordoba; 7 Tai Peete; 25 Ian Petrutz; -- Luis Pino; 37 José Suárez	Manager: 18 Roberto Espinoza; Coaches: 55 Jason Eary (bench); 46 Mike Habas (hitting); 47 Michael Oh (pitching); 43 Wade Stauss (assistant); 60-day injured list: -- Frank Elissalt; -- Joseph King; -- Bruno López; 7-day injured list; * On St. Louis Cardinals 40-man roster; ~ Development list; # Rehab assignment; ∞ Reserve list; ‡ Restricted list; § Suspended list; † Temporarily inactive list; Roster updated May 13, 2026; Transactions; → More rosters: MiLB • Midwest League; → St. Louis Cardinals minor league players

=== Quad Cities River Bandits ===
Quad Cities River Bandits roster
Players	Coaches/Other
Pitchers: 34 Hunter Alberini; 49 Nick Conte; 52 Kamden Edge; 19 Josh Hansell; 27 Aiden Jimenez; 17 Tanner Jones; 57 L.P. Langevin; 22 Mason Miller; 14 Coleman Picard; 55 Yimi Presinal; 40 Emmanuel Reyes; 32 Cory Ronan; 12 David Shields; 23 Ryan Ure; 18 Blake Wolters; Catchers: 48 Angel Acosta; 3 Blake Mitchell; 6 Ramon Ramirez; Infielders: 16 Chris Brito; 41 Jose Cerice; 9 Austin Charles; 8 Derlin Figueroa; 25 Diego Guzman; 2 Tyriq Kemp; Outfielders: -- Carter Frederick; 7 Asbel Gonzalez; 47 Luke Pelzer; 1 Nolan Sailors; 4 Erick Torres; 28 Trevor Werner	Manager: 24 Jesus Azuaje; Coaches: -- Emmanuel Burriss (hitting); 43 Derrick Lewis (pitching); 37 Luke Lowery (coach); -- Clayton Mortensen (assistant pitching); 60-day injured list: -- Bryson Dudley (full season); -- Chase Isbell; -- Sam Ruta (military leave); 7-day injured list; * On Kansas City Royals 40-man roster; ~ Development list; # Rehab assignment; ∞ Reserve list; ‡ Restricted list; § Suspended list; † Temporarily inactive list; Roster updated May 12, 2026; Transactions; → More rosters: MiLB • Midwest League; → Kansas City Royals minor league players

=== South Bend Cubs ===
South Bend Cubs roster
Players	Coaches/Other
Pitchers: 28 Ethan Bell; 40 Jackson Brockett; 19 Kenten Egbert; 34 Ethan Flanagan; 29 Jostin Florentino; 32 Eli Jerzembeck; 45 Ben Johnson; 50 Grayson Moore; 6 Koen Moreno; 8 Nazier Mulé; 30 Kenyi Perez; 37 Cole Reynolds; 41 Alfredo Romero; -- Jose Romero; 38 Brayden Spears; 25 Adam Stone; 21 Kevin Valdez; 33 JP Wheat; 39 Nate Williams; Catchers: 22 Dilan Granadillo; 11 Justin Stransky; 20 Miguel Useche; Infielders: 9 Drew Bowser; 17 Angel Cepeda; 4 Leonel Espinoza; 24 Matt Halbach; 17 Alex Madera; 21 Cole Mathis; 5 Christian Olivo; 7 Reginald Preciado; 35 Cameron Sisneros; 7 Ty Southisene; Outfielders: 2 Kane Kepley; 15 Kade Snell	Manager: 3 Daniel Wasinger; Coaches: 16 Max Anastasio (performance); 36 JC Bonilla (pitching); 18 Henry Haack (pitching); 27 Chris Pieters (hitting); 44 Nate Spears (hitting); 60-day injured list: -- Evan Aschenbeck; 3 Drew Gray; -- Brayden Risedorph; -- Connor Spencer; 7-day injured list; * On Chicago Cubs 40-man roster; ~ Development list; # Rehab assignment; ∞ Reserve list; ‡ Restricted list; § Suspended list; † Temporarily inactive list; Roster updated May 12, 2026; Transactions; → More rosters: MiLB • Midwest League; → Chicago Cubs minor league players

=== Wisconsin Timber Rattlers ===
Wisconsin Timber Rattlers roster
Players	Coaches/Other
Pitchers: 35 Ethan Dorchies; 25 Jesus Flores; 27 Michael Fowler; 28 Yorman Galindez; 31 Bjorn Johnson; 18 Bryce Meccage; 39 Jose Nova; 29 Braylon Owens; 19 Bryan Rivera; 30 Yerlin Rodriguez; 20 Jack Seppings; 33 Travis Smith; 37 Wande Torres; 23 Chandler Welch; 26 Jason Woodward; Catchers: 15 Blayberg Diaz; 5 Marco Dinges; 17 David García; 21 Tayden Hall; Infielders: 9 Josh Adamczewski; 1 Luiyin Alastre; 2 Juan Baez; 24 Eric Bitonti; 3 Daniel Dickinson; 11 Andrew Fischer; 10 Daniel Guilarte; 32 Quinton Low; 13 Luis Peña; Outfielders: 16 Luis Castillo; 6 Braylon Payne; 4 Josiah Ragsdale	Manager: 7 Nick Stanley; Coaches: -- Evan Berliner (hitting); -- Patrick McGuff (pitching); -- Liu Rodríguez (coach); 60-day injured list: -- Daniel Corniel; -- Will Rudy; 7-day injured list; * On Milwaukee Brewers 40-man roster; ~ Development list; # Rehab assignment; ∞ Reserve list; ‡ Restricted list; § Suspended list; † Temporarily inactive list; Roster updated May 7, 2026; Transactions; → More rosters: MiLB • Midwest League; → Milwaukee Brewers minor league players

== See also ==
- List of Northwest League team rosters
- List of South Atlantic League team rosters
