= Lake Elsinore Storm =

- Founded in 1994; Lake Elsinore, California
Team logo
Cap insignia

Minor league affiliations
- Class: Single-A (2021–present)
- Previous classes: Class A-Advanced (1994–2020)
- League: California League (1994–present)
- Division: South Division

Major league affiliations
- Team: San Diego Padres (2001–present)
- Previous teams: Los Angeles Angels (1994–2000)

Minor league titles
- League titles (5): 1996; 2001; 2011; 2022; 2026
- Division titles (9): 1996; 2001; 2005; 2007; 2011; 2019; 2022; 2024; 2026
- First-half titles (3): 2022; 2024; 2026
- Second-half titles (1): 2024

Team data
- Name: Lake Elsinore Storm (1994–present)
- Colors: Black, red, white
- Mascots: Thunder, Mini Thunder, and Jackpot
- Ballpark: Lake Elsinore Diamond (1994–present)
- Owner(s)/ Operator(s): Gary E. Jacobs & Len Simon
- General manager: Shaun Brock (CEO); Christine Kavic (CFO)
- Manager: Brallan Perez
- Website: mlb.com/milb/lake-elsinore

The Lake Elsinore Storm are a Minor League Baseball team based in Lake Elsinore, California. The Storm compete in the California League as the Single-A affiliate of the San Diego Padres. They play their home games at Lake Elsinore Diamond, which opened in 1994; the park seats 7,866 people.

The Storm were established in 1994 after the Palm Springs Angels relocated to Lake Elsinore following the 1993 season. They served as the Class A-Advanced affiliate of the Los Angeles Angels through 2000. They have been affiliated with the San Diego Padres since 2001. In conjunction with Major League Baseball's reorganization of the minors in 2021, the California League was reclassified as a Single-A circuit, and the Storm continued their affiliation with San Diego at this level.

Lake Elsinore has won the California League championship five times—once as a farm club for the Los Angeles Angels and four times with the San Diego Padres.

== History ==
The Storm began playing in 1994 after the Palm Springs Angels relocated to Lake Elsinore, California. The California League franchise continued as the Los Angeles Angels's Class A-Advanced affiliate through 2000. In 2001, the San Diego Padres switched their High-A affiliation to Lake Elsinore from the Rancho Cucamonga Quakes, who became the Angels' High-A club.

On May 18, 2007, the Storm set a league record for most lopsided victory, beating the Lancaster JetHawks by a 30–0 score.

Since the 2004 opening of Petco Park, the home stadium of the Padres, the Storm have played one home game there toward the end of each season, as the second half of a doubleheader following a Padres daytime home game. Usually, its opponent has been the California League farm team of the Padres' same-day opponents.

In 2011, Nate Freiman played for the Storm setting single-season club records with 22 home runs and 111 RBI.

On September 7, 2019, the Storm defeated the Rancho Cucamonga Quakes, 11–2, to win the California League South Division finals and advance to their sixth California League championship series. They faced the Visalia Rawhide, the champions of the North Division, losing the series, 3–1.

In conjunction with Major League Baseball's restructuring of Minor League Baseball in 2021, the Storm were organized into the Low-A West at the Low-A classification. In 2022, the Low-A West became known as the California League, the name historically used by the regional circuit prior to the 2021 reorganization, and was reclassified as a Single-A circuit.

== Roster ==
Lake Elsinore Storm roster
Players	Coaches/Other
Pitchers: 50 Yoesmerli Beltre; 43 Coleman Borthwick; 30 Jesus A. Castro; 29 Adler Cecil; -- Humberto Cruz ‡; 38 Rob Evans; 19 Sean Fitzpatrick; 41 James Guyette; 16 Landry Jurecka; 32 Rordy Mejia; 48 Joe Musgrove * #; 43 Cameron Nohos; 37 Jack Pineau; 33 Tyler Pitzer; 17 Ryan Reed; 39 Albert Roblez; 20 Michael Salina; 36 Tyler Schmitt; 52 Kruz Schoolcraft; 23 Benjamin Stubbs; 18 Lan-Hong Su; 46 Jordan Valenzuela; 26 Andrew Wright; Catchers: 33 Jake Bold ~; 21 Ty Harvey; 28 Augie Lopez; 27 Truitt Madonna; Infielders: 12 Nu'u Contrades; 15 Elliot Lascelles; 16 Chris McHugh; 5 Jorge Quintana; 8 Joe Tiroly; 2 Jose Verdugo; 25 Dawson Willis; Outfielders: 10 Jesmaylin Arias; 47 Alex Conover; 45 Qrey Lott	Manager: 11 Brallan Perez; Coaches: 9 Travis Craven (pitching); 4 Ruddy Giron (hitting); 44 Greg Starbuck (bench); 60-day injured list: 45 Kale Fountain (full season); -- Matt LaChappa (full season); 25 Ethan Long (full season); -- Mario Zabala; 7-day injured list; * On San Diego Padres 40-man roster; ~ Development list; # Rehab assignment; ∞ Reserve list; ‡ Restricted list; § Suspended list; † Temporarily inactive list; Roster updated September 13, 2026; Transactions; → More rosters: MiLB • California League; → San Diego Padres minor league players

== Notable alumni ==
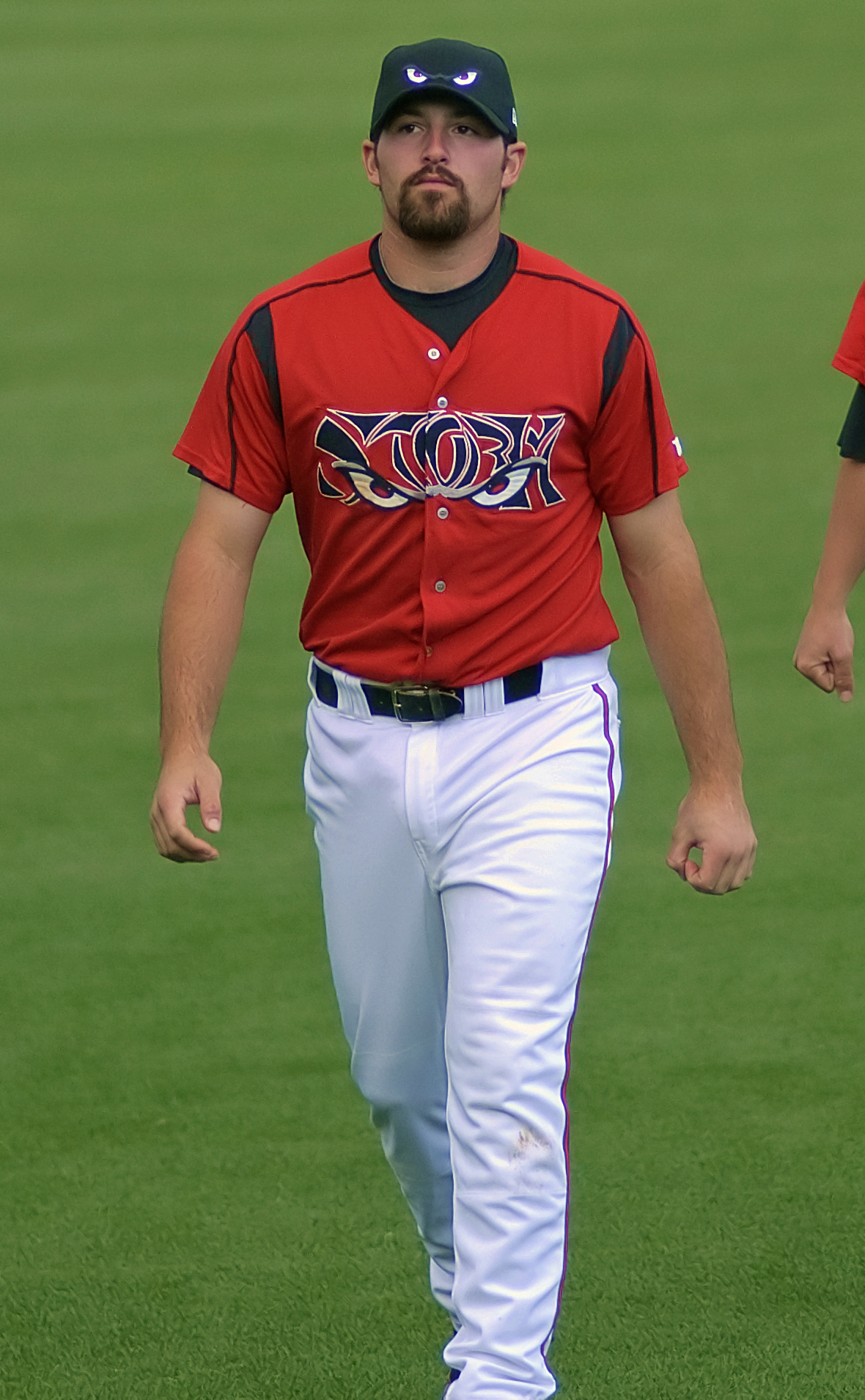
Cody Decker with the Storm in 2010

- Dylan Axelrod
- Josh Barfield
- Kyle Blanks
- Cody Decker
- Steve Delabar
- Darin Erstad
- David Freese
- Nate Freiman
- Ernesto Frieri
- Khalil Greene
- Jedd Gyorko
- Dirk Hayhurst
- Chase Headley
- Nick Hundley
- Ben Johnson
- Corey Kluber
- John Lackey
- Rymer Liriano
- Xavier Nady
- Wande Olabisi
- Jake Peavy
- Óliver Pérez
- Robb Quinlan
- Francisco Rodríguez
- Tim Stauffer
