= List of California League team rosters =

Each of the eight teams of Minor League Baseball's California League carry a 30-man active roster. Only these players are eligible to play.

Teams may have any number of inactive players on their rosters at a given time who do not count toward active roster limits. Injured players may be placed on the injured list (7-day or 60-day). The temporary inactive list and bereavement list are for players attending to personal matters. Major league players may be placed on rosters for injury rehabilitation for a maximum of 20 days for non-pitchers and 30 days for pitchers.

Players who are ineligible to play due to failure to adhere to the Minor League Drug Prevention and Treatment Program, violations of their contract, who are receiving team disciplinary action, or who are unable to join the team due to visa problems may be placed on the restricted or suspended lists. These players count against a team's active roster limit.

Each team usually has a three-man coaching staff including a manager, hitting coach, and pitching coach. Depending on each Major League Baseball organization's development approach, some teams may have additional coaches.

== North Division ==
=== Fresno Grizzlies ===
Fresno Grizzlies roster
Players	Coaches/Other
Pitchers: 16 Nathan Blasick; 11 Brody Brecht; 20 Seth Clausen; 27 Jackson Cox; 21 Austin Emener; 36 Tyler Hampu; 22 Zach Harris; 40 Marcos Herrera; 47 Fisher Jameson; 28 Angel Jimenez; 21 Justin Loer; 23 Ismael Luciano; 31 Zack Morris; 15 Manuel Olivares; 49 Wilmis Paulino; Catchers: 13 Juan Castillo; 45 Alan Espinal; 32 Jesus Freitez; 29 Matt Klein; Infielders: 2 Derek Bernard; 1 Roldy Brito; 4 Wilder Dalis; 25 Kevin Fitzer; 5 Roynier Hernandez; 7 Kelvin Hidalgo; 29 Jacob Hinderleider; 18 Ethan Holliday; 30 Tanner Thach; Outfielders: 8 Robert Calaz; 9 Jacob Humphrey; 3 Yeiker Reyes; 20 Felix Tena	Manager: 6 Cesar Galvez; Coaches: -- Geoff Brown (pitching); 12 Greg Jones (hitting); 28 Dave Keller (bench); -- Jeremiah Stewart (performance); 60-day injured list: -- Luke Jewett; 7-day injured list; * On Colorado Rockies 40-man roster; ~ Development list; # Rehab assignment; ∞ Reserve list; ‡ Restricted list; § Suspended list; † Temporarily inactive list; Roster updated March 17, 2026; Transactions; → More rosters: MiLB • California League; → Colorado Rockies minor league players

=== San Jose Giants ===
San Jose Giants roster
Players	Coaches/Other
Pitchers: -- Sam Bower; 33 Jacob Bresnahan; 31 Dylan Carter; 34 Argenis Cayama; 49 Luis De La Torre; 15 Hunter Dryden; 46 Ricardo Estrada; 18 Mauricio Estrella; 54 Evan Gray; 43 Cole Hillier; 39 Cale Lansville; 55 Gerelmi Maldonado; 51 Yunior Marte; 37 Keyner Martinez; 13 Niko Mazza; 28 Jose T. Perez; 32 Melvin Pineda; 16 Ryan Slater; 40 Fernando Vasquez; 19 Cade Vernon; Catchers: 17 Diego Cartaya; 12 Fernando Gonzalez; -- Ty Hanchey; 48 Juan Perez; 39 Daniel Rogers; Infielders: 41 Jeremiah Jenkins; 29 Robert Hipwell; 1 Gavin Kilen; 12 Jhonny Level; 9 Walker Martin; 35 Lorenzo Meola; 5 Ryan Reckley; 6 Dario Reynoso; Outfielders: 23 Trevor Cohen; 10 Lisbel Diaz; 23 Carlos Gutierrez; 2 Dakota Jordan; 5 Cameron Maldonado	Manager: 21 Ydwin Villegas; Coaches: -- Mike Marjama (hitting); -- Drew Martinez (fundamentals); 50 Dan Runzler (pitching); 60-day injured list: 18 Drake George; 8 Jose Ortiz; 7-day injured list; * On San Francisco Giants 40-man roster; ~ Development list; # Rehab assignment; ∞ Reserve list; ‡ Restricted list; § Suspended list; † Temporarily inactive list; Roster updated March 18, 2026; Transactions; → More rosters: MiLB • California League; → San Francisco Giants minor league players

=== Stockton Ports ===
Stockton Ports roster
Players	Coaches/Other
Pitchers: 21 Wilfred Alvarado; -- Ryan Brown; 22 Felix Castro; 34 Nathan Dettmer; 23 Jose Dicochea; 26 Jay Dill; 46 Samuel Dutton; 38 Richard Fernandez; -- Jackson Finley; 16 Camilo Hernandez; 18 Riley Huge; 17 Jefferson Jean; 12 Griffin Kirn; 15 Alejandro Manzano; 44 Cole Miller; 33 Tucker Novotny; 40 Brayan Restituyo; 27 Sam Stuhr; 46 Donny Troconis; Catchers: 8 Bryan Andrade; 2 Bryan Arendt; 14 Cesar Gonzalez; 10 Thomas Takayoshi; Infielders: 9 Bobby Boser; 6 Michael Brooks; 37 Max Durrington; 9 Jared Sprague-Lott; 3 Jesus Superlano; Outfielders: 14 Bobby Blandford; 4 Rodney Green Jr.; 7 Devin Taylor; 11 Gavin Turley	Manager: -- Darryl Kennedy; Coaches: -- Cooper Goldby (hitting); 35 Jim Gott (pitching); -- Jose Ortiz (hitting); 7-day injured list; * On Athletics 40-man roster; ~ Development list; # Rehab assignment; ∞ Reserve list; ‡ Restricted list; § Suspended list; † Temporarily inactive list; Roster updated November 6, 2025; Transactions; → More rosters: MiLB • California League; → Athletics minor league players

=== Visalia Rawhide ===
Visalia Rawhide roster
Players	Coaches/Other
Pitchers: -- Rio Britton; 8 Ryan Bruno; 3 Junior Ciprian; 36 Mervin Fell; 21 Jake Fitzgibbons; 12 Connor Foley; 16 Alex Galvan; -- Caden Grice; 39 Sawyer Hawks; 35 Chung-Hsiang Huang; 37 Jaitoine Kelly; 15 Alexis Liebano; 24 Taylor Montiel; 16 Gregori Ramirez; 30 Erick Reynoso; 12 Sandro Satana; 31 Josdanner Suarez; 20 Daury Vasquez; Catchers: 6 Alberto Barriga; -- Juan Centeno; 21 Ivan Luciano; 34 Carlos Virahonda; Infielders: 23 Alexander Benua; 7 Diosfran Cabeza; 11 Wallace Clark; 13 Kayson Cunningham; 4 Abdias De La Cruz; 26 JD Dix; 9 Yerald Nin; 18 Enyervert Perez; 5 Yassel Soler; Outfielders: 22 Jose Alpuria; 1 Jakey Josepha; 32 Trent Youngblood	Manager: 2 Dee Garner; Coaches: -- Jancarlos Cintron (hitting); -- Rolando Garza (pitching); -- Mickey Jiang (bench); 60-day injured list: 39 Deyer Zapata (full season); 7-day injured list; * On Arizona Diamondbacks 40-man roster; ~ Development list; # Rehab assignment; ∞ Reserve list; ‡ Restricted list; § Suspended list; † Temporarily inactive list; Roster updated March 17, 2026; Transactions; → More rosters: MiLB • California League; → Arizona Diamondbacks minor league players

== South Division ==
=== Inland Empire 66ers ===
Inland Empire 66ers roster
Players	Coaches/Other
Pitchers: 9 Yensy Bello; 35 Gage Boehm; 13 Aiden Butler; 22 Gleiner Diaz; 23 Reid Easterly; -- German Fajardo; 19 Walter Ford; 38 Trevor Long; 37 Aneury Lora; 25 Reese Lumpkin; 36 Daniel Ouderkirk; -- Will Riley; 20 Colton Shaw; -- Jack White; 31 Jose Zerpa; Catchers: 33 Luke Stevenson; Infielders: 14 Starlin Aguilar; -- Nick Becker; 30 Ricardo Cova; 16 Dustin Crenshaw; 7 Austin St. Laurent; 6 Dervy Ventura; Outfielders: 3 Korbyn Dickerson; 43 George Feliz; 18 Carlos Jimenez; 17 Ryan Picollo; 4 Cesar Quintas; 10 Aidan Taurek	Manager: 12 Luis Caballero; Coaches: 21 Josh Morgan (bench); -- Sam Delaplane (pitching); 60-day injured list: 48 Dalton Davis; 23 Harrison Kreiling; -- Anyelo Ovando (full season); 36 Adrian Quintana; 27 Chia-shi Shen; 15 Matt Tiberia; 7-day injured list; * On Seattle Mariners 40-man roster; ~ Development list; # Rehab assignment; ∞ Reserve list; ‡ Restricted list; § Suspended list; † Temporarily inactive list; Roster updated March 17, 2026; Transactions; → More rosters: MiLB • California League; → Seattle Mariners minor league players

=== Lake Elsinore Storm ===
Lake Elsinore Storm roster
Players	Coaches/Other
Pitchers: 18 Bryan Balzer; 46 Winyer Chourio; 29 Humberto Cruz ‡; 47 Jaxon Dalena; 15 Vicarte Domingo; -- Clay Edmondson; 9 Igor Gil; 34 Bernard Jose; 29 Landry Jurecka; 17 Kannon Kemp; 16 Will Koger; 44 Kash Mayfield; -- Carson Montgomery; 52 Cameron Nohos; -- Kleiber Olmedo; 38 Abraham Parra; -- Zack Qin; 26 Ryan Reed; 31 Kruz Schoolcraft; 32 Carson Swilling; 43 Jordan Valenzuela; 48 Charlie Walker; Catchers: 33 Ty Harvey; 27 Truitt Madonna; 8 Yoiber Ocopio; 23 Carlos Rodriguez; Infielders: 25 Kerrington Cross; 25 Justin DeCriscio; 45 Kale Fountain; 4 Bradley Frye; 5 Dylan Grego; 6 Jorge Quintana; Outfielders: 1 George Bilecki; 37 Alex McCoy; 21 Kavares Tears; 2 Cardell Thibodeaux; 10 Ryan Wideman	Manager: -- Brallan Perez; Coaches: -- Travis Craven (pitching); -- Ruddy Giron (hitting); 21 Greg Starbuck (bench); 60-day injured list: -- Matt LaChappa (full season); -- Mario Zabala; 7-day injured list; * On San Diego Padres 40-man roster; ~ Development list; # Rehab assignment; ∞ Reserve list; ‡ Restricted list; § Suspended list; † Temporarily inactive list; Roster updated March 20, 2026; Transactions; → More rosters: MiLB • California League; → San Diego Padres minor league players

=== Ontario Tower Buzzers ===
Ontario Tower Buzzers roster
Players	Coaches/Other
Pitchers: 31 Dailoui Abad; 23 Isaac Ayon; -- Alvaro Benua; 45 Luis Carias; 18 Justin Chambers; 56 Davis Chastain; 30 Marco Corcho; 34 Dilan Figueredo; 43 Domingo Geronimo; 37 Connor Godwin; -- Tyler Gough; -- Spencer Green; 21 Jholbran Herder; 29 Hyun-seok Jang; 15 Jhonny Jimenez; 25 Cody Morse; 6 Marlon Nieves; 11 Shawndrick Oduber; -- Samuel Sanchez; 33 Brady Smith; 51 Dylan Tate; 36 Jesus Tillero; 3 Jakob Wright; Catchers: 17 Victor Rodrigues; Infielders: 54 Chase Harlan; -- Kellon Lindsey; 9 Mairoshendrick Martinus; 7 Emil Morales; 35 Oswaldo Osorio; 10 Niko Perez; -- Joendry Vargas; Outfielders: 44 Charles Davalan; 41 Jaron Elkins; 46 Ching-Hsien Ko; 27 Jose Meza; 13 Brendan Tunink; 5 Landyn Vidourek	Manager: 12 John Shoemaker; Coaches: -- Michael Charters (development); 40 Johermyn Chavez (hitting); -- Sean Coyne (pitching); -- Jeremy Gaines (outfield & baserunning); -- Jose Gutierrez (performance); -- Ezra Lacina (bullpen catcher); -- Luis Vasquez (pitching); 48 Dunior Zerpa (bench); 7-day injured list; * On Los Angeles Dodgers 40-man roster; ~ Development list; # Rehab assignment; ∞ Reserve list; ‡ Restricted list; § Suspended list; † Temporarily inactive list; Roster updated March 25, 2026; Transactions; → More rosters: MiLB • California League; → Los Angeles Dodgers minor league players

=== Rancho Cucamonga Quakes ===
Rancho Cucamonga Quakes roster
Players	Coaches/Other
Pitchers: 15 Derek Clark; 18 Alton Davis II; 43 Leonard Garcia; 23 Victor Garcia; 46 Will Gervase; 47 Trey Gregory-Alford; 28 Stone Hewlett; 36 Dylan Jordan; 10 Barrett Kent; 27 Fulton Lockhart; -- Jesus Martinez; 33 Peyton Olejnik; 29 Zachary Redner; 16 Yokelvin Reyes; 19 Ubaldo Soto; 14 Benny Thompson; 17 Najer Victor; 31 Jaren Warwick; Catchers: 44 Caleb Bartolero; 7 Kevin Bruggeman; -- Kaden Hopson; 13 Jonathan Linares; 6 Marlon Quintero; 24 Alberto Rios; 34 Eliezer Rivero; Infielders: 21 Slate Alford; 8 Harold Coll; 15 Caleb Ketchup; 4 Johan Macias; 25 Jake Munroe; 2 Nick Rodriguez; 5 John Wimmer; Outfielders: 30 Hayden Alvarez; 6 Kevyn Castillo; 9 Raudi Rodriguez; 3 Jorge Ruiz	Manager: 22 Dave Stapleton; Coaches: 45 Elmer Dessens (pitching); -- Raywilly Gomez (hitting); 35 Steven Hernandez (coach); -- Dioner Navarro (coach); 7-day injured list; * On Los Angeles Angels 40-man roster; ~ Development list; # Rehab assignment; ∞ Reserve list; ‡ Restricted list; § Suspended list; † Temporarily inactive list; Roster updated March 20, 2025; Transactions; → More rosters: MiLB • California League; → Los Angeles Angels minor league players

== See also ==
- List of Carolina League team rosters
- List of Florida State League team rosters
