= Lakeland Flying Tigers =

- Founded in 1960; Lakeland, Florida
Team logo
Cap insignia

Minor league affiliations
- Class: Single-A (2021–present)
- Previous classes: Class A-Advanced (1990–2020); Class A (1962–1989); Class D (1960)
- League: Florida State League (1960–present)
- Division: West Division

Major league affiliations
- Team: Detroit Tigers (1963–present)
- Previous teams: San Francisco Giants (1962); Cleveland Indians (1960)

Minor league titles
- League titles (5): 1976; 1977; 1992; 2012; 2025
- Division titles (2): 2024; 2025
- First-half titles (1): 2025
- Second-half titles (3): 2023; 2024; 2025

Team data
- Name: Lakeland Flying Tigers (2007–present)
- Previous names: Lakeland Tigers (1963–2006); Lakeland Giants (1962); Lakeland Indians (1960)
- Ballpark: Publix Field at Joker Marchant Stadium (1966–2001, 2003–2015, 2017–present)
- Previous parks: Henley Field (1960, 1962–1965, 2002, 2016)
- Owner/ Operator: Detroit Tigers
- General manager: Zach Burek
- Manager: Salvador Paniagua
- Website: milb.com/lakeland

The Lakeland Flying Tigers are a Minor League Baseball team of the Florida State League and the Single-A affiliate of the Detroit Tigers. They are located in Lakeland, Florida, and play their home games at Publix Field at Joker Marchant Stadium.

== History ==
The team was established in 1960 as the Lakeland Indians, an affiliate of the Cleveland Indians. After a one-year hiatus, the team was restarted in 1962 as the Lakeland Giants, an affiliate of the San Francisco Giants.

The franchise affiliated with the Detroit Tigers' farm system in 1963 and became known as the Lakeland Tigers before becoming the Flying Tigers in 2007. The relationship with Detroit is one of the two longest unbroken affiliate relationships currently existing.

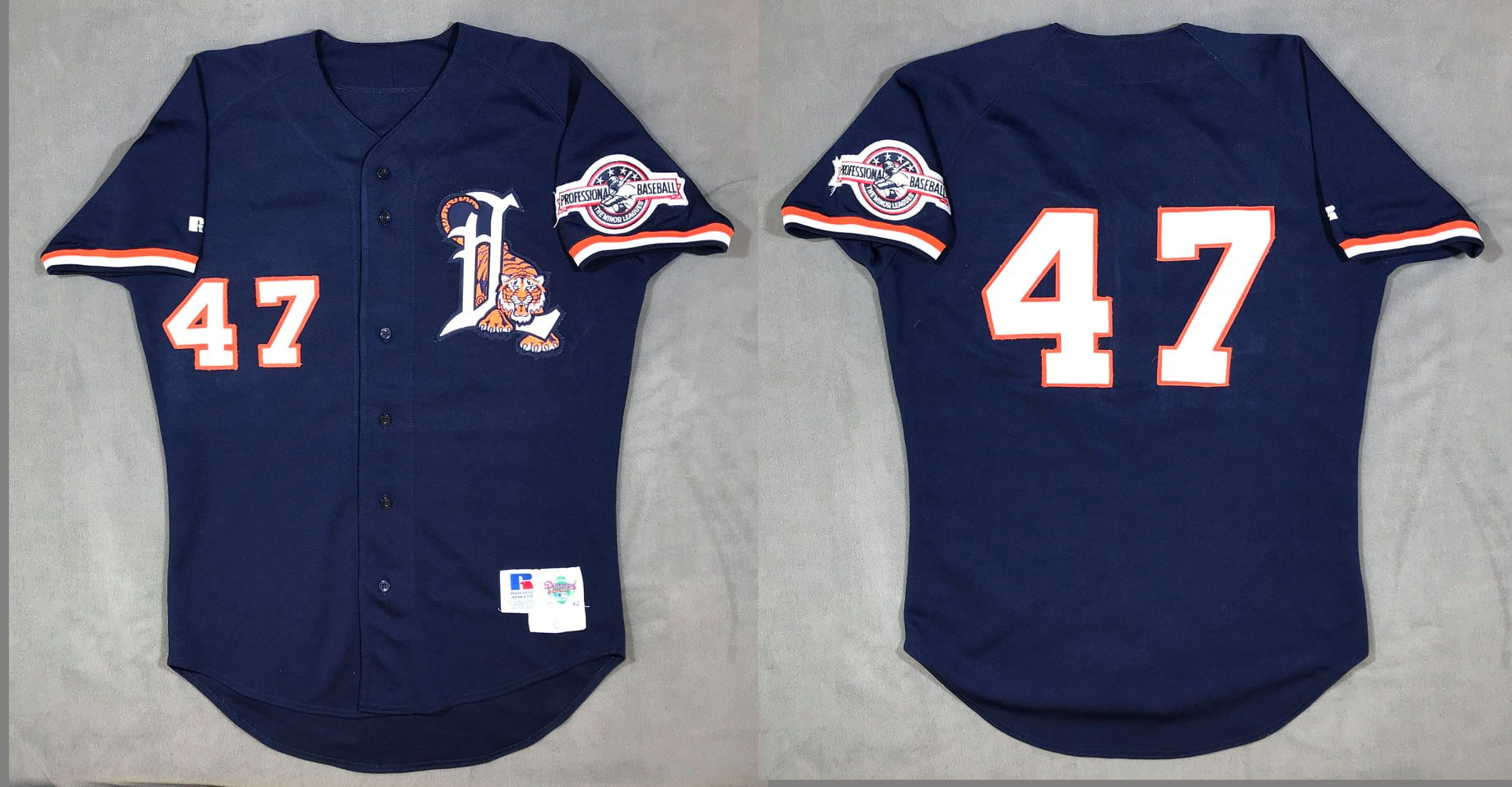
1996 Lakeland Tigers #47 game worn road jersey

In 1997, playing with the Tigers, Gabe Kapler led the Florida State League in doubles and total bases, and tied for first in extra base hits.

In 2012, the Flying Tigers won their first FSL title in 20 years by defeating the Jupiter Hammerheads, three games to two. It was the fourth league title in club history.

In 2006, the team introduced a new name and colors to pay homage to the Lakeland School of Aeronautics, later the Lodwick School of Aeronautics. The school trained over 8,000 pilots between 1940 and 1945, some of whom later flew with the Flying Tigers in China during World War II, and was actually located at the current site of Publix Field at Joker Marchant Stadium.

In conjunction with Major League Baseball's restructuring of Minor League Baseball in 2021, the Flying Tigers were organized into the Low-A Southeast at the Low-A classification. In 2022, the Low-A Southeast became known as the Florida State League, the name historically used by the regional circuit prior to the 2021 reorganization, and was reclassified as a Single-A circuit.

== Roster ==
Lakeland Flying Tigers roster
Players	Coaches/Other
Pitchers: 36 Jan Caraballo; 44 Donye Evans; 21 Antonio Florido; 46 Pedro Garcia; 41 Yendy Gomez; 26 Grayson Grinsell; 45 Xiomer Guacache; 9 Jose Guzman; 17 Owen Hall; 28 Duque Hebbert; 38 Luke Hoskins; 39 Marco Jiminez #; 32 Cash Kuiper; 15 Caleb Leys; 40 Maddox Long; 52 Troy Melton * #; 50 Andrew Pogue; 60 Kelvis Salcedo; 34 Win Scott; 9 Cale Wetwiska; 46 Paul Wilson; 35 Malachi Witherspoon; Catchers: 27 Hunter Dobbins; 24 Edian Espinal; 43 Thayron Liranzo * #; 25 Sergio Tapia ~; Infielders: 20 Beau Ankeney; 33 Jack Goodman; -- Tyson LeBlanc; 5 Javier Osorio; 18 Carson Rucker; 4 Jude Warwick; 19 Jordan Yost; Outfielders: 48 Roberto Campos #; 14 Nick Dumesnil; 37 Jesus Pinto; 29 Anibal Salas	Manager: 67 Salvador Paniagua; Coaches: 31 Tyler Anderson (pitching); 12 Chris Gutierrez (bench); 51 Fred Landers (hitting); 60-day injured list: -- River Hamilton (full season); -- Michael Massey; -- Wuilberth Mendez (full season); 7 Franyerber Montilla (full season); -- Michael Oliveto; 57 Jorger Petri (full season); 39 Joe Ruzicka (full season); 17 Alistair Tanner (full season); -- Shay Timmer; 7-day injured list; * On Detroit Tigers 40-man roster; ~ Development list; # Rehab assignment; ∞ Reserve list; ‡ Restricted list; § Suspended list; † Temporarily inactive list; Roster updated July 27, 2026; Transactions; → More rosters: MiLB • Florida State League; → Detroit Tigers minor league players

== Notable alumni ==
Baseball Hall of Fame alumni

- Jack Morris (1989) Inducted 2018
- John Smoltz (1986) Inducted, 2015
- Jim Leyland (1964, 1969, 1976-1978-MGR) 3 x MLB Manager of the Year; Manager: 1997 World Series Champion - Florida Marlins; Inducted, 2024

Notable former ballplayers

- Tony Clark (1993) MLB All-Star
- Francisco Cordero (1998) 3 x MLB All-Star
- Juan Encarnacion (1994, 1996)
- Mark Fidrych (1975, 1978) 2 x MLB All-Star; 1976 AL ERA Leader; 1976 AL Rookie of the Year
- Tito Fuentes (1962)
- Kirk Gibson (1978) 1986 NL Most Valuable Player; 2011 NL Manager of the Year
- Curtis Granderson, 3 x MLB All-Star; Member of the 20-20-20-20 Club
- Jerry Grote (1985-MGR) 2 x MLB All-Star
- Carlos Guillén (2011) 3 x MLB All-Star
- Bill Gullickson (1993) 1991 AL Wins Leader
- Omar Infante (2000) MLB All-Star
- Howard Johnson (1979-1980) 2 x MLB All-Star
- Gabe Kapler (1997), Outfielder and manager
- Ron Leflore (1974) MLB All-Star; 2 x AL Stolen Base Leader
- Rick Leach (1979)
- Jose Lima (1991-1992, 1995) MLB All-Star
- Torey Lovullo (1987), MLB manager
- Sam McDowell (1960) 6 x MLB All-Star; 1965 AL ERA Leader
- Elliott Maddox (1968)
- Jerry Manuel (1973) 2000 AL Manager of the Year
- Andrew Miller (2007) 2 x MLB All-Star
- Phil Nevin (1997) MLB All-Star
- Lance Parrish (1975) 8 x MLB All-Star
- Dan Petry (1977, 1986) MLB All-Star
- Rick Porcello (2008) 2016 AL Cy Young Award
- Fernando Rodney (1999, 2001) 3 x MLB All-Star
- Cody Ross
- Vern Ruhle (1973)
- Chuck Scrivener
- Gary Sheffield (2008) 9 x MLB All-Star; 1992 NL Batting Title
- Drew Smyly
- Walt Terrell (1988)
- Rob Thomson (1987), MLB manager
- Pat Underwood
- Ugueth Urbina (2004) 2 x MLB All-Star
- Justin Verlander (2005) 6 x MLB All-Star; 2006 AL Rookie of the Year; 2011 AL Cy Young Award; 2011 AL Most Valuable Player; etc.
- David Wells (1994) 3 x MLB All-Star; 1998-Pitched Perfect Game
- Lou Whitaker (1976) 5 x MLB All-Star; 1978 AL Rookie of the Year
- Dontrelle Willis (2009) 2 x MLB All-Star; 2003 NL Rookie of the Year
- John Wockenfuss (1987)
- Dmitri Young (2006) 2 x MLB All-Star

== Playoffs ==
- 2025: Defeated Clearwater 2–0 in semifinals; defeated Daytona 2–0 to win championship.
- 2024: Lost Palm Beach 2–1 in championship.
- 2023: Lost Clearwater 2–1 in semifinals.
- 2012: Defeated Dunedin 2–0 in semifinals; defeated Jupiter 3–2 to win championship.
- 2005: Defeated Dunedin 2–0 in semifinals; lost to Palm Beach 3–2 in finals.
- 2002: Defeated Jupiter 2–0 in semifinals; lost to Charlotte 3–2 in finals.
- 1997: Lost to St. Petersburg 2–0 in semifinals.
- 1993: Lost to St. Lucie 2–1 in semifinals.
- 1992: Defeated West Palm Beach 2–0 in quarterfinals; defeated Clearwater 2–0 in semifinals; defeated Baseball City 2–0 to win championship.
- 1991: Lost to West Palm Beach 2–0 in semifinals.
- 1990: Lost to West Palm Beach 2–1 in semifinals.
- 1989: Lost to St. Petersburg 2–1 in semifinals.
- 1988: Lost to St. Lucie 2–1 in quarterfinals.
- 1987: Lost to Fort Lauderdale 2–0 in semifinals.
- 1978: Defeated St. Petersburg 1–0 in semifinals; lost to Miami 2–1 in finals.
- 1977: Defeated Miami 2–0 in semifinals; defeated St. Petersburg 3–1 to win championship.
- 1976: Defeated Miami 2–0 in semifinals; defeated Tampa 2–0 to win championship.
- 1974: Lost to Fort Lauderdale 2–0 in semifinals.
- 1973: Lost to West Palm Beach 2–1 in semifinals.
- 1970: Lost to Miami 2–0 in semifinals.
