= San Diego Padres minor league players =

The San Diego Padres are an American professional baseball team based in San Diego. The Padres compete in Major League Baseball (MLB) as a member club of the National League (NL) West Division. Below are select minor league players of the Padres organization and the rosters of their minor league affiliates:

== Players ==
=== Clay Edmondson ===
Clay Edmondson

San Diego Padres
- Pitcher
- Born: June 24, 2003 (age 23); Greensboro, North Carolina, U.S.
- Bats: Right Throws: Right

Clayton Matthew Edmondson (born June 24, 2003) is an American professional baseball pitcher in the San Diego Padres organization.

Edmondson attended Southern Guilford High School and played college baseball at Guilford Technical Community College for one season before he transferred to the University of North Carolina at Asheville. As a redshirt junior for UNC Asheville in 2025, he started 13 games and went 5–2 with a 2.20 ERA and 87 strikeouts over 81 2/3 innings and was named the Big South Conference Pitcher of the Year. After the season, he entered the transfer portal and committed to the University of Tennessee.

Edmondson was selected by the San Diego Padres in the 14th round of the 2025 Major League Baseball draft. He signed with the Padres and made his professional debut after signing with the Single-A Lake Elsinore Storm with whom he made six relief appearances, and he also played in one game for the Triple-A El Paso Chihuahuas. Edmondson opened the 2026 season with the High-A Fort Wayne TinCaps and was promoted to the Double-A San Antonio Missions in June. Across 41 relief appearances between the two teams, he had a 2–4 record, a 5.36 ERA and 54 strikeouts across 45 1/3 innings.

- Career statistics from Baseball Reference (Minors)
- UNC Asheville Bulldogs bio

=== Luis Gutierrez ===
Luis Gutierrez

San Diego Padres
- Pitcher
- Born: July 31, 2003 (age 23); Cabimas, Venezuela
- Bats: Left Throws: Left

Luis Alejandro Gutierrez (born August 24, 1998) is a Venezuelan professional baseball pitcher in the San Diego Padres organization.

Gutierrez was added to the team's 40-man roster on November 2, 2026.

- Career statistics from Baseball Reference (Minors)

=== Ian Koenig ===
Ian Koenig

San Diego Padres
- Pitcher
- Born: April 9, 2001 (age 25); San Jose, California, U.S.
- Bats: Left Throws: Right

Ian Gregory Koenig (born April 9, 2001) is an American professional baseball pitcher in the San Diego Padres organization.

Koenig played college baseball at Cabrillo College. He signed with the San Diego Padres as an undrafted free agent in 2022. The Padres added him to their 40-man roster after the 2026 season.

- Career statistics from Baseball Reference (Minors)

=== Isaiah Lowe ===
Isaiah Lowe

San Diego Padres
- Pitcher
- Born: May 7, 2003 (age 23); Shelby, North Carolina, U.S.
- Bats: Right Throws: Right

Isaiah Daniel Lowe (born May 7, 2003) is an American professional baseball pitcher in the San Diego Padres organization.

Lowe attended Combine Academy in Lincolnton, North Carolina, where he played baseball as a pitcher and third baseman. He committed to play college baseball at Wake Forest University. Lowe was selected by the San Diego Padres in the 11th round of the 2022 Major League Baseball draft, and signed with the team for $400,000.

Lowe made his professional debut in 2023 with the Arizona Complex League Padres and Lake Elsinore Storm, but appeared in only four games before undergoing season-ending shoulder surgery. He returned to Lake Elsinore to open the 2024 season and was promoted to the Fort Wayne TinCaps in late July. Over 24 games (twenty starts) between the two teams, Lowe went 7–6 with a 3.33 ERA and 111 strikeouts over 105 1/3 innings. Lowe returned to Fort Wayne for the 2025 season. Over 22 starts, he pitched to a 3–12 record, a 5.69 ERA and 70 strikeouts over 91 2/3 innings. Lowe was assigned to play in the Arizona Fall League with the Peoria Javelinas after the season. In 2026, he pitched in 35 games with both Lake Elsinore and Fort Wayne and went 3–7 with a 7.03 ERA and 67 strikeouts over 73 innings.

- Career statistics from Baseball Reference (Minors)

=== Tucker Musgrove ===
Tucker Musgrove

San Diego Padres
- Pitcher
- Born: February 1, 2002 (age 24); Chunchula, Alabama, U.S.
- Bats: Right Throws: Right

Tucker Noah Musgrove (born February 1, 2002) is an American professional baseball pitcher in the San Diego Padres organization.

Musgrove attended Mary G. Montgomery High School in Semmes, Alabama. He had a 3-0 win–loss record with a 1.40 earned run average (ERA) during a COVID-19 pandemic shortened season as a senior in 2020. After graduating, he enrolled at the University of Mobile where he played three years of college baseball. As a junior at Mobile in 2023, he had a 3.00 ERA across 18 appearances alongside eight home runs and a .397 batting average.

Musgrove was selected by the San Diego Padres in the seventh round of the 2023 Major League Baseball draft as a two-way player. He signed with the Padres for $175,000. Musgrove underwent Tommy John surgery shortly after signing with the Padres, and did not appear in a game in 2023 or 2024. He made his professional debut in 2025 with the Single-A Lake Elsinore Storm and pitched to a 2–0 record, a 5.40 ERA and 26 strikeouts across 20 innings. After the season, he played in the Arizona Fall League with the Peoria Javelinas. He was assigned to the High-A Fort Wayne TinCaps to start the 2026 season. He made 19 relief appearances for Fort Wayne and posted a 2–0 record, a 3.79 ERA, and 40 strikeouts over 19 innings and was subsequently promoted to the Double-A San Antonio Missions in June. Across 15 relief appearances with San Antonio, Musgrove went 0–2 with a 2.93 ERA, 28 strikeouts, and 12 walks across 15 1/3 innings. After the season, the Padres added him to their 40-man roster to protect him from the Rule 5 draft.

- Career statistics from MLB · ESPN · Fangraphs · Baseball Reference (Minors)

=== Kruz Schoolcraft ===
Kruz Schoolcraft

San Diego Padres
- Pitcher
- Born: April 18, 2007 (age 19); Albuquerque, New Mexico, U.S.
- Bats: Left Throws: Left

Kruz Schoolcraft (born April 18, 2007) is an American professional baseball pitcher and first baseman in the San Diego Padres organization.

Schoolcraft attended Sunset High School in Beaverton, Oregon. He played as a pitcher and also played first base in high school. As a junior in 2024, he went 10–1 with a 0.39 earned run average (ERA), and 146 strikeouts over 71 2/3 innings as a pitcher and hit .506 with seven home runs and 30 runs batted in (RBI).

Schoolcraft entered his senior year in 2025 as a top prospect for the 2025 Major League Baseball draft. He was committed to play college baseball at the University of Tennessee. Schoolcraft was selected with the 25th overall pick in the first round of the 2025 Major League Baseball draft by the San Diego Padres. Schoolcraft signed with the Padres for a $3,606,600 signing bonus on July 24, 2025.

- Career statistics from MLB · Fangraphs · Baseball Reference (Minors)

=== Ryan Wideman ===
Ryan Wideman

San Diego Padres
- Outfielder
- Born: November 4, 2003 (age 23); Gijon, Spain
- Bats: Right Throws: Right

Ryan Wideman (born November 4, 2003) is an American professional baseball outfielder in the San Diego Padres organization.

Wideman was born in Spain, while his father, Tom Wideman, was playing professional basketball there. He attended Walton High School in Marietta, Georgia and played college baseball at Georgia Highlands College and Western Kentucky University.

Wideman was selected by the San Diego Padres in the third round of the 2025 Major League Baseball draft. He had committed to transfer to Clemson University to continue playing college baseball but signed with the Padres. He made his professional debut that season with the Lake Elsinore Storm and started 2026 with them.

- Career statistics from Baseball Reference (Minors)

== Full Triple-A to Rookie League rosters ==
=== Triple-A ===
El Paso Chihuahuas roster
Players		Coaches/Other
Pitchers: 9 Abraham Parra; -- Roel Ramirez; 55 Ethan Routzahn; 36 Eli Villalobos	Catchers: 11 Oswaldo Linares; 33 Anthony Vilar; Infielders: 5 Marcos Castañon; 29 José Miranda; 20 Rosman Verdugo; Outfielders: 30 Braedon Karpathios; 33 Kai Murphy; -- Cal Stevenson	Manager: 3 Pete Zamora; Coaches: 16 Morgan Burkhart (bench); 13 Miguel Del Castillo (bench); 45 Jimmy Jones (assistant pitching); 12 Scott Mitchell (pitching); 53 Ben Rosenthal (hitting); 7-day injured list; * On San Diego Padres 40-man roster; ~ Development list; # Rehab assignment; ∞ Reserve list; ‡ Restricted list; § Suspended list; † Temporarily inactive list; Roster updated November 18, 2026; Transactions; → More rosters: MiLB • Pacific Coast League; → San Diego Padres minor league players

=== Double-A ===
San Antonio Missions roster
Players		Coaches/Other
Pitchers: 14 Manuel Castro; 29 Omar Cruz; 34 Clay Edmondson; 9 Sadrac Franco; 29 Igor Gil; 33 Lucas Giolito; 18 Harry Gustin; 7 Jamie Hitt; 31 Bernard Jose; 30 Victor Lizarraga; 23 Josh Mallitz; 20 Carlos Medina; 25 Carson Montgomery; 6 Johan Moreno; 29 Ryan Och; -- Cole Paplham; 19 Francis Peña; 9 Enmanuel Pinales; 21 Fernando Sanchez; -- Jackson Smeltz; 7 Will Varmette; 11 Eric Yost	Catchers: 28 Brendan Durfee; 66 Andy Thomas ‡; Infielders: 16 Jack Costello; 1 Justin DeCriscio; 10 Wyatt Hoffman; 13 Ryan Jackson; 33 Romeo Sanabria; Outfielders: 14 Jake Cunningham; 40 Alex McCoy; 24 Kai Roberts	Manager: 26 Chris Tremie; Coaches: 17 Erick Abreu (pitching); 39 Brian Burres (bench); 44 Eric Del Prado (hitting); 7-day injured list; * On San Diego Padres 40-man roster; ~ Development list; # Rehab assignment; ∞ Reserve list; ‡ Restricted list; § Suspended list; † Temporarily inactive list; Roster updated November 17, 2026; Transactions; → More rosters: MiLB • Texas League; → San Diego Padres minor league players

=== High-A ===
Fort Wayne TinCaps roster
Players		Coaches/Other
Pitchers: 22 Miguel Alvarez; 16 Bryan Balzer; 11 Javier Chacon; 13 Winyer Chourio; -- Jaxon Dalena; 32 Nick Falter; 22 Kannon Kemp; 43 Will Koger; 33 Brandon Langley; 18 Isaiah Lowe; -- Tyler Morgan; 28 Braian Salazar; -- Diego Serna; 4 Florangel Vasquez; 20 Jeferson Villabona; 36 Matthew Watson	Catchers: 24 Lamar King Jr.; 30 Robbie Lavey; 41 Yoiber Ocopio; Infielders: 23 Luke Cantwell; -- Raimundo De Los Santos; 3 Bradley Frye; 25 Dylan Grego; 21 Yimy Tovar; 15 Jonathan Vastine; Outfielders: 14 Sean Barnett (two way); 26 Ryan Gerety; 25 Kavares Tears; 9 Kasen Wells; 8 Conner Westenburg; 17 Ryan Wideman	Manager: 5 Jon Mathews; Coaches: 29 Yorman Bazardo (pitching); 50 Jerry Downs (hitting); 2 Luis Mendez (bench); 7-day injured list; * On San Diego Padres 40-man roster; ~ Development list; # Rehab assignment; ∞ Reserve list; ‡ Restricted list; § Suspended list; † Temporarily inactive list; Roster updated November 13, 2026; Transactions; → More rosters: MiLB • Midwest League; → San Diego Padres minor league players

=== Single-A ===
Lake Elsinore Storm roster
Players		Coaches/Other
Pitchers: 50 Yoesmerli Beltre; 43 Coleman Borthwick; 30 Jesus A. Castro; 29 Adler Cecil; -- Humberto Cruz ‡; 38 Rob Evans; 19 Sean Fitzpatrick; 41 James Guyette; 16 Landry Jurecka; -- Matt LaChappa; 25 Ethan Long; 32 Rordy Mejia; 43 Cameron Nohos; 37 Jack Pineau; 33 Tyler Pitzer; 17 Ryan Reed; 39 Albert Roblez; 20 Michael Salina; 36 Tyler Schmitt; 52 Kruz Schoolcraft; 23 Benjamin Stubbs; 18 Lan-Hong Su; 46 Jordan Valenzuela; 26 Andrew Wright; -- Mario Zabala	Catchers: 33 Jake Bold; 21 Ty Harvey; 28 Augie Lopez; 27 Truitt Madonna; Infielders: 12 Nu'u Contrades; 45 Kale Fountain; 15 Elliot Lascelles; 16 Chris McHugh; 5 Jorge Quintana; 8 Joe Tiroly; 2 Jose Verdugo; 25 Dawson Willis; Outfielders: 10 Jesmaylin Arias; 47 Alex Conover; 45 Qrey Lott	Manager: 11 Brallan Perez; Coaches: 9 Travis Craven (pitching); 4 Ruddy Giron (hitting); 44 Greg Starbuck (bench); 7-day injured list; * On San Diego Padres 40-man roster; ~ Development list; # Rehab assignment; ∞ Reserve list; ‡ Restricted list; § Suspended list; † Temporarily inactive list; Roster updated November 2, 2026; Transactions; → More rosters: MiLB • California League; → San Diego Padres minor league players

=== Rookie ===
Arizona Complex League Padres roster
Players		Coaches/Other
Pitchers: 99 Erick Batista; -- Ty Brachbill; -- Griffin Canning *; -- Aidan Cochrane; 61 Julio Dilone; -- Chris Downs; 56 Marco Eluscat; -- Angel Hernandez; -- Joseph Herrera; 76 Dane Lais; -- Ryan Lynch; -- Luis Maracara; -- Maikel Miralles; -- Daichi Moriki; 91 Dalvi Nunez; 44 Kleiber Olmedo; 60 Jose Ortega; 65 Jeronimo Palmeros; -- Zack Qin; -- AJ Rogers; -- Logan Satter	Catchers: -- Deivid Coronil; 98 Jhojan Downer; -- Alcides Hernandez; 23 Jack Mathey; 78 Isaac Ponce; -- Mark Quatrani; Infielders: 25 Abraham Bastidas; 37 Jhoan De La Cruz; 11 Luis De Leon; -- Ryan Kucherak; -- Gabriel Ollarves; 27 Santiago Vargas; Outfielders: -- Drew Detlefsen; 4 Eddson Martinez; -- Mac Moyer; -- Josh Skowronski; -- Michael Smith Jr.; 45 Moises Valdez	Manager: 24 Jhonaldo Pozo; Coaches: 15 Brian Betancourth (bench); 8 Nolan Earley (hitting); 39 Ernesto Frieri (pitching); 32 Yunir Garcia (hitting); 17 Yoel Monzon (rehab pitching); 23 Jed Morris (hitting); 47 Leo Rosales (pitching); 44 Scott Stroud (bench); 7-day injured list; * On San Diego Padres 40-man roster; ~ Development list; # Rehab assignment; ∞ Reserve list; ‡ Restricted list; § Suspended list; † Temporarily inactive list; Roster updated November 13, 2026; Transactions; → More rosters: MiLB • Arizona Complex League; → San Diego Padres minor league players

=== Foreign Rookie ===
Dominican Summer League Padres Brown roster
Players		Coaches/Other
Pitchers: 20 Diego Alfonzo; 28 Gensy Aquino; 29 Jose Blanco; 14 Edward Bonifacio; 36 Daniel Burciaga; -- Jordany Del Orde; 53 Ariel Dilone; 40 Jesus Heredia; 32 Heiver Hernandez; 55 Kelvin Marte; 25 Jhoiner Mayora; 44 Luis Morales; 54 Rickelby Ramos; 29 Daniel Rodriguez; 3 Diego Roldan; 17 Diosaride Sarit; 30 Aneury Sosa; 25 Randy Soto; 26 Rafael Torres; -- Deon Tusent	Catchers: 47 Sebastion Maldonado; 27 Pedro Silva; Infielders: 12 Ronnier Heras; 5 Yonaiker Hernandez; -- Chrystian Herrero; 18 Osmy Osorio; -- Yomar Maduro; Outfielders: 41 Jhostin Fuentes; 4 Rafael Moran; 9 Berman Moreno; -- Lenyert Rios; 7 Luis Rodriguez; 34 Luis Sanchez	Manager: -- Wilfri De La Cruz; Coaches: -- Duanel Jones (hitting); -- Luis Lugo (pitching); -- Jackson Quezada (pitching); -- Juan Rojas (bench); 7-day injured list; * On San Diego Padres 40-man roster; ~ Development list; # Rehab assignment; ∞ Reserve list; ‡ Restricted list; § Suspended list; † Temporarily inactive list; Roster updated November 13, 2026; Transactions; → More rosters: MiLB • Dominican Summer League; → San Diego Padres minor league players

Dominican Summer League Padres Gold roster
Players		Coaches/Other
Pitchers: 34 Carlos Alvarez; 43 Raymel Belliard; 54 Michel Cervantes; 44 Joel Duarte; 46 Josias Figuereo; 26 Edwyn Hernandez; 37 Angel Gamarra; -- Joel Gonzalez; 8 Jeferson Ogando; 32 Wilfred Paca; 52 Jederson Paez; 38 Albert Perez; 15 Jordan Perez; 27 Jose Perez; 17 Raudi Perez; 53 Valentin Perez; 20 Yojansy Perez; 8 Albieris Polanco; 52 Emmanuel Polo; 36 Guillermo Romero; 30 Yunny Tovar; 21 Yoandres Valdiviezo; 15 Jackson Vasquez	Catchers: 45 Dayquer Alfonzo; 4 Jeanfranco Fernandez; 14 Johanneiker Leon; 16 Angel Mejia; 39 Gabriel Teran; 25 Joseph Uzeta; Infielders: 2 Darian Castillo; 9 Dawry Guerrero; 9 Joniel Hernandez; 22 Timothy Mogen; 1 Yorvin Morla; 7 Sebastian Nadales; 33 Eliander Primera; 26 Endy Rios; Outfielders: 13 Cristian Benavides; 24 Ricardo De La Paz; 11 Sebastian Pena	Manager: -- Diego Cedena; Coaches: -- Rogelio De Campo (bench); -- Josue Matos (pitching); -- Felipe Morillo (bench); -- Edinson Rincon (hitting); 7-day injured list; * On San Diego Padres 40-man roster; ~ Development list; # Rehab assignment; ∞ Reserve list; ‡ Restricted list; § Suspended list; † Temporarily inactive list; Roster updated November 2, 2026; Transactions; → More rosters: MiLB • Dominican Summer League; → San Diego Padres minor league players
