= Ryan Mitchell =

Ryan Mitchell may refer to:

- Ryan Mitchell (swimmer)
- Ryan Mitchell (Power Rangers)
- Ryan Mitchell (baseball)
