= List of Florida State League team rosters =

Each of the 10 teams of Minor League Baseball's Florida State League carry a 30-man active roster. Only these players are eligible to play.

Teams may have any number of inactive players on their rosters at a given time who do not count toward active roster limits. Injured players may be placed on the injured list (7-day or 60-day). The temporary inactive list and bereavement list are for players attending to personal matters. Major league players may be placed on rosters for injury rehabilitation for a maximum of 20 days for non-pitchers and 30 days for pitchers.

Players who are ineligible to play due to failure to adhere to the Minor League Drug Prevention and Treatment Program, violations of their contract, who are receiving team disciplinary action, or who are unable to join the team due to visa problems may be placed on the restricted or suspended lists. These players count against a team's active roster limit.

Each team usually has a three-man coaching staff including a manager, hitting coach, and pitching coach. Depending on each Major League Baseball organization's development approach, some teams may have additional coaches.

== East Division ==
=== Daytona Tortugas ===
Daytona Tortugas roster
Players	Coaches/Other
Pitchers: 33 Brady Afthim; 8 Bryce Archie; 38 Jake Brink; 28 Ben Brutti; 7 Edgar Colon; -- Ty Floyd; 14 Abraham Gaitan; 16 Lisnerkin Lantigua; -- Anyer Laureano; 24 Sheng-En Lin; 11 Kyle McCoy; 21 Mason Morris; 20 Nelfri Payano; 17 Ovis Portes; 27 Dominic Scheffler; 48 Andrew Shaffner; 31 Tristan Smith; 37 Stharlin Torres; 40 Deivi Villafana; 32 Mike Villani; Catchers: 3 Jacob Friend; 10 Henry Hunter; 28 Dylan King; Infielders: 13 Ichiro Cano; 4 Tyson Lewis; 1 Bernard Moon; 2 Rafhlmil Torres; 25 Anthuan Valencia; Outfielders: 5 Drew Davies; 6 Kyle Henley; 44 Arnaldo Lantigua; 34 Mason Neville	Manager: 11 Willie Harris; Coaches: 2 Karavin Dew (performance); 30 Lenny Harris (bench); 50 Jason Immekus (pitching); 18 Jose Leon (hitting); 60-day injured list: -- Hunter Hollan; -- Luke Holman; -- Gabe Starks (full season); -- Logan Van Treeck; 7-day injured list; * On Cincinnati Reds 40-man roster; ~ Development list; # Rehab assignment; ∞ Reserve list; ‡ Restricted list; § Suspended list; † Temporarily inactive list; Roster updated April 23, 2026; Transactions; → More rosters: MiLB • Florida State League; → Cincinnati Reds minor league players

=== Jupiter Hammerheads ===
Jupiter Hammerheads roster
Players	Coaches/Other
Pitchers: 32 Keyner Benitez; 22 Samuel Carpio; 43 Walin Castillo; 21 Jake Clemente; 28 Juan De La Cruz; 13 Luis De La Cruz; 37 Jake Faherty; 30 Manuel Genao; 29 Julio Mendez; 52 Franklyn Moreta; 55 Elier Morillo; 6 Nate Payne; 33 Michael Perez; 34 Braulio Salas; 17 Ramon Sanchez; 36 Jadon Williamson; Catchers: 15 Jeremy Almonte; 20 Victor Ortega; 18 Carlos Sanchez; Infielders: 9 Emilio Barreras; 27 Josh Hogue; 4 Carter Johnson; 1 Abrahan Ramirez; 3 Andrew Salas; 14 Yoffry Solano; 24 Echedry Vargas; Outfielders: 25 Julio Henriquez; 58 Jose Monserrate; 8 PJ Morlando; 12 Esmil Valencia; 10 Andres Valor	Manager: 11 Kyle Stahlberg; Coaches: -- Wilfri Castro (assistant); 5 Gabe Ortiz (assistant); -- Tommy Phelps (pitching); -- Easton Waterman (hitting); 60-day injured list: 23 Chris Arroyo; 55 Jessada Brown; 50 Darwin Rodriguez (full season); -- Grant Shepardson; 35 RJ Shunck; 20 Max Williams; 7-day injured list; * On Miami Marlins 40-man roster; ~ Development list; # Rehab assignment; ∞ Reserve list; ‡ Restricted list; § Suspended list; † Temporarily inactive list; Roster updated April 24, 2026; Transactions; → More rosters: MiLB • Florida State League; → Miami Marlins minor league players

=== Palm Beach Cardinals ===
Palm Beach Cardinals roster
Players	Coaches/Other
Pitchers: 39 Yadiel Batista; 30 Liam Best; 33 Alex Breckheimer; 29 Cade Crossland; 32 Antoni Cuello; 34 Dylan Driessen; 26 Kaden Echeman; 39 Patrick Galle; 31 Jovi Gálvez; 28 Yordy Herrera; 35 Robbie Knowles; 47 Jack Martinez; 46 Rubén Menes; 50 Jacob Odle; 36 Jake Shelagowski; 51 Tyler Van Dyke; -- Anthony Watts; 48 Ethan Young; Catchers: 4 Alex Birge; 41 Heriberto Caraballo; 49 Chase Heath; Infielders: 11 Michael Dattalo; 37 Jack Gurevitch; 8 Trevor Haskins; 3 Christian Martin; 13 Jonathan Mejía; -- Yairo Padilla; 5 Johnfrank Salazar; 40 Brayden Smith; 16 Ryan Weingartner; Outfielders: 19 Ryan Mitchell; -- Matthew Miura; 15 Cameron Nickens; 25 Yordalin Peña; 22 Luis Pino	Manager: 44 Rich Benjamin; Coaches: 7 Yucary De La Cruz (bench); 27 Evan Johnson (pitching); 21 Rodrigo Vigil (assistant); 60-day injured list: -- Andrew Dutkanych IV; 7-day injured list; * On St. Louis Cardinals 40-man roster; ~ Development list; # Rehab assignment; ∞ Reserve list; ‡ Restricted list; § Suspended list; † Temporarily inactive list; Roster updated April 15, 2026; Transactions; → More rosters: MiLB • Florida State League; → St. Louis Cardinals minor league players

=== St. Lucie Mets ===
St. Lucie Mets roster
Players	Coaches/Other
Pitchers: 29 Luis Alvarez; 21 Frank Camarillo; 66 Nicolas Carreno; 48 Jose Chirinos; 60 Jorge De Leon; 52 Ryan Dollar; 54 Joey Gerber # *; 53 R.J. Gordon #; -- Daviel Hurtado; 77 Luke Jackson; 58 Joel Lara; 64 Nate Lavender #; 67 José Marte #; 19 Tyler McLoughlin; 57 Miguel Mejias; 55 Ernesto Mercedes; 39 Elwis Mijares; 50 Emilio Obispo; 32 Christian Rodriguez; 68 Dylan Ross * #; 26 Joe Scarborough; 45 Cam Tilly; 22 Conner Ware; 25 Caden Wooster; Catchers: 27 Chase Meggers; 59 Francisco Toledo; 13 Julio Zayas; Infielders: 10 Branny De Oleo; 56 Vladi Gomez; 11 Randy Guzman; 34 Eddinson Paulino; 3 Elian Pena; 4 Sam Robertson; -- Jeremy Rodriguez; Outfielders: 12 JT Benson; 49 Sam Biller; 2 Simon Juan; 1 AJ Salgado	Manager: 9 Luis Rivera; Coaches: 30 Jonathan Cramman (bench); 51 David Mervis (pitching); 23 Bryan Muniz (hitting); 40 Jimmy Nelson (assistant pitching); 60-day injured list: -- Candido Cuevas; -- Jace Hampson; -- Ethan Lanthier; -- Wilson Lopez; -- Edgar Moreta; -- Trey Snyder; 7-day injured list; * On New York Mets 40-man roster; ~ Development list; # Rehab assignment; ∞ Reserve list; ‡ Restricted list; § Suspended list; † Temporarily inactive list; Roster updated April 26, 2026; Transactions; → More rosters: MiLB • Florida State League; → New York Mets minor league players

== West Division ==
=== Bradenton Marauders ===
Bradenton Marauders roster
Players	Coaches/Other
Pitchers: 24 Gavin Adams; 16 Jack Anker; 17 Brandon Cain; -- Jaiker Garcia; 31 Seth Hernandez; 12 Jeter Martinez; 22 David Matoma; 34 Greiber Mendez; 13 Zander Mueth; 39 Noah Murdock; 50 Reinold Navarro; 36 Adolfo Oviedo; 55 Treyson Peters; 47 Roilan Portuondo; 30 Pitterson Rosa; 35 Levi Sterling; 15 Noah Takacs; 25 Clevari Tejada; -- Jesus Travieso; 26 Draven Zeigler; Catchers: 48 Samuel Escudero; 19 Edgleen Perez; -- Richard Ramirez; 27 Luke Scherrer; Infielders: 3 Carlos Caro; 45 Murf Gray; 10 Brent Iredale; 2 Dylan Palmer; 32 Antonio Pimentel; 6 Eddie Rynders; Outfielders: 54 Edward Florentino #; 43 Cristian Jauregui; 28 Eddie King Jr.; 5 Canon Reeder; 38 Estuar Suero; 7 Josh Tate	Manager: 18 Gera Alvarez; Coaches: 5 Quentin Brown (hitting); 41 Matt Ford (pithing); 14 Jose Mendez (bench); 44 Gustavo Omana (catching); 23 Ryan Powers (hitting); 52 Jonathan Prieto (hitting); 60-day injured list: -- Dylan Mathiesen; -- Isaias Uribe; 7-day injured list; * On Pittsburgh Pirates 40-man roster; ~ Development list; # Rehab assignment; ∞ Reserve list; ‡ Restricted list; § Suspended list; † Temporarily inactive list; Roster updated April 21, 2026; Transactions; → More rosters: MiLB • Florida State League; → Pittsburgh Pirates minor league players

=== Clearwater Threshers ===
Clearwater Threshers roster
Players	Coaches/Other
Pitchers: 38 Keegan Batka; 28 Tyler Bowen; 21 Cody Bowker; 45 Richie Cortese; 17 Gabe Craig; 44 Marty Gair; 54 Cole Gilley; 40 Orlando Gonzalez; 29 Tanner Gresham; 9 Peyton Havard; 18 Camron Hill; 16 Christian McGowan #; 47 MT Morrissey; -- Cade Obermueller; 51 Brad Pacheco; 39 Wen-Hui Pan #; 35 Jacob Pruitt; -- James Tallon; 27 Brian Walters; 19 Gage Wood; 55 Sean Youngerman; 13 Zuher Yousuf; Catchers: 7 Alirio Ferrebus; 49 Angel Mata; 10 Will Vierling; Infielders: 52 Nolan Beltran; 3 Matthew Ferrara; 5 Tyler Pettorini; 6 Robert Phelps; 2 Juan Villavicenio; Outfielders: 24 Griffin Burkholder; 25 Jaeden Calderon; 4 Jonathan Hogart; 23 Nathan Humphreys; 31 Manolfi Jimenez; -- TJayy Walton	Manager: 30 Aaron Barrett; Coaches: 48 Alex Concepcion (assistant pitching); 33 Matt Ellmyer (pitching); 41 Chris Heintz (hitting); 8 Desmond Jennings (assistant hitting); 22 Shawn Williams (bench); 60-day injured list: -- Kleyderve Andrade; -- Kyler Carmack; -- Yhoan Escalona; -- Jonathan Gonzalez; -- Naoel Mejia; -- Cesar Mujica; -- Zack Tukis; 7-day injured list; * On Philadelphia Phillies 40-man roster; ~ Development list; # Rehab assignment; ∞ Reserve list; ‡ Restricted list; § Suspended list; † Temporarily inactive list; Roster updated April 25, 2026; Transactions; → More rosters: MiLB • Florida State League; → Philadelphia Phillies minor league players

=== Dunedin Blue Jays ===
Dunedin Blue Jays roster
Players	Coaches/Other
Pitchers: 11 Brandon Barriera; 46 José Berríos #; 36 Mason Davenport; 17 Diego Dominguez; 21 Jack Eshleman; 44 Troy Guthrie; 40 Brayden Heidel; 24 Karson Ligon; 10 Carson Myers; 38 Noah Palmese; 39 Dayne Pengelly; 35 Nolan Perry; 31 Lluveres Severino; 45 Franly Urena; 43 Luis Victorino; 25 Dylan Watts; 34 Reece Wissinger; Catchers: 15 Will Cresswell; 16 Juan Rosas; 13 Charlie Saum; -- Brock Tibbetts; 20 Jaxson West; Infielders: 41 Raimundo De Los Santos; 30 Aldo Gaxiola; 12 JoJo Parker; 47 Adrian Pinto #; 7 Dariel Ramon; 8 Juan Sanchez; 1 Eric Snow; Outfielders: 46 Victor Arias #; 27 David Beckles; 22 Enmanuel Bonilla; 23 Blaine Bullard; 29 Yorman Licourt; 5 Austin Smith	Manager: -- Ryan Casteel; Coaches: -- Antonio Caceres (assistant pitching); -- Andy Fermin (coach); -- Brett Kennedy (pitching); -- Nash Knight (hitting); -- Ashley Stephenson (bench); 60-day injured list: -- Jean Joseph; 7-day injured list; * On Toronto Blue Jays 40-man roster; ~ Development list; # Rehab assignment; ∞ Reserve list; ‡ Restricted list; § Suspended list; † Temporarily inactive list; Roster updated April 26, 2026; Transactions; → More rosters: MiLB • Florida State League; → Toronto Blue Jays minor league players

=== Fort Myers Mighty Mussels ===
Fort Myers Mighty Mussels roster
Players	Coaches/Other
Pitchers: 17 Travis Adams #; 12 Matthew Dalquist; 45 Matthew DesMarets; 44 Adam Falinski; 1 Joel Garcia; 40 Eric Hammond; 15 Michael Hilker; 43 Merit Jones; 37 Xavier Kolhosser; 97 Cory Lewis #; 16 Mike McKenna; -- Justin Mitrovich; 20 Reed Moring; 41 Mitch Mueller; 38 Jake Murray; -- Dylan Questad; 32 Riley Quick; -- Jason Reitz; 30 Kolten Smith; 22 Jonathan Stevens; 17 Ramiro Villanueva; 27 Brian Zelden; Catchers: 33 Ian Dougherty; -- Enrique Jiminez; 46 Irvin Nunez; Infielders: 11 Bryan Acuna; -- Bruin Agbayani; 5 Ramiro Dominguez; 8 Harry Genth; 4 Yilber Herrera; 25 Jorel Ortega #; 50 Dameury Pena; 35 JP Smith II; 48 Ryan Sprock; 23 Quentin Young; Outfielders: 21 Jayson Bass; 24 Eduardo Beltre; 9 Byron Chourio; 13 Yasser Mercedes	Manager: 39 Jordan Smith; Coaches: 18 Dylan Hawley (pitching); 19 Carlos Lara (hitting); 26 Richard Salazar (pitching); 60-day injured list: -- Matt Barr; -- Jack Dougherty (full season); 31 James Ellwanger; -- Callan Fang; -- Jace Kaminska; -- Cesar Lares; -- Cleiber Maldonado; -- Billy Oldham; 8 Shai Robinson (full season); 7-day injured list; * On Minnesota Twins 40-man roster; ~ Development list; # Rehab assignment; ∞ Reserve list; ‡ Restricted list; § Suspended list; † Temporarily inactive list; Roster updated April 25, 2026; Transactions; → More rosters: MiLB • Florida State League; → Minnesota Twins minor league players

=== Lakeland Flying Tigers ===
Lakeland Flying Tigers roster
Players	Coaches/Other
Pitchers: 36 Jan Caraballo; 28 Charlie Christensen; 45 Jatnk Diaz; 44 Donye Evans; 21 Pedro Garcia; 41 Yendy Gomez; 26 Grayson Grinsell; 9 Jose Guzman; 30 Bailey Horn #*; 38 Luke Hoskins; 14 Ben Jacobs; -- Cash Kuiper; 15 Caleb Leys; 40 Eliseo Mota; 50 Andrew Pogue; -- Kelvis Salcedo; 17 Alistair Tanner; 39 Yoan Valdez; 9 Cale Wetwiska; -- Joey Wimpelberg; 35 Malachi Witherspoon; Catchers: 24 Edian Espinal; 48 Thayron Liranzo #*; 7 Newremberg Rondon; 25 Sergio Tapia; Infielders: 20 Beau Ankeney; 33 Jack Goodman; -- Franyerber Montilla; 5 Javier Osorio; 18 Carson Rucker; 4 Jude Warwick; 19 Jordan Yost; Outfielders: 13 Zach MacDonald; 37 Jesus Pinto; 29 Anibal Salas; 27 Caleb Shpur	Manager: 67 Salvador Paniagua; Coaches: 31 Tyler Anderson (pitching); 12 Chris Gutierrez (bench); 51 Fred Landers (hitting); 60-day injured list: -- River Hamilton (full season); -- Michael Massey; -- Wuilberth Mendez (full season); -- Michael Oliveto; 57 Jorger Petri (full season); -- Shay Timmer; -- Paul Wilson; 7-day injured list; * On Detroit Tigers 40-man roster; ~ Development list; # Rehab assignment; ∞ Reserve list; ‡ Restricted list; § Suspended list; † Temporarily inactive list; Roster updated April 22, 2026; Transactions; → More rosters: MiLB • Florida State League; → Detroit Tigers minor league players

=== Tampa Tarpons ===
Tampa Tarpons roster
Players	Coaches/Other
Pitchers: 13 Brian Arias; 14 Thomas Balboni Jr.; 11 Tyler Boudreau; 35 Greysen Carter; 39 J.T. Etheridge; 19 Allen Facundo; 48 Danny Flatt; 32 Blake Gillespie; 46 Henry Lalane; 17 Jose Ledesma; 41 Jose Martinez; 40 Jordarlin Mendoza; 20 Jose M. Rodriguez; 47 Pedro Rodriguez; 45 Yerry Rodríguez #; 6 Parker Seay; 24 Josh Tiedemann; 30 Matthew Tippie; 25 Justin West; Catchers: 28 Gregory Bozzo; 15 Ediel Rivera; 29 Engelth Urena; Infielders: 21 Santiago Gomez; 2 Austin Green; -- Dax Kilby; 18 Jackson Lovich; 7 Bryce Martin-Grudzielanek; 10 Hans Montero; 5 Enmanuel Tejeda; 22 Kevin Verde; Outfielders: 11 JoJo Jackson; 3 Logan Maxwell; 12 Brando Mayea; 27 Willy Montero	Manager: 24 Zak Wasserman; Coaches: 53 Gerardo Casadiego (pitching); 50 Carlos Mendez (hitting); 19 Ben Somorjai (hitting); 4 Josciel Veras (defensive); 60-day injured list: -- Richie Bonomolo Jr.; -- Antonio Gomez; -- Edinzo Marquez; -- David McCann; -- Wyatt Parliament; 7-day injured list; * On New York Yankees 40-man roster; ~ Development list; # Rehab assignment; ∞ Reserve list; ‡ Restricted list; § Suspended list; † Temporarily inactive list; Roster updated April 17, 2026; Transactions; → More rosters: MiLB • Florida State League; → New York Yankees minor league players

== See also ==
- List of California League team rosters
- List of Carolina League team rosters
