= Wande Olabisi =

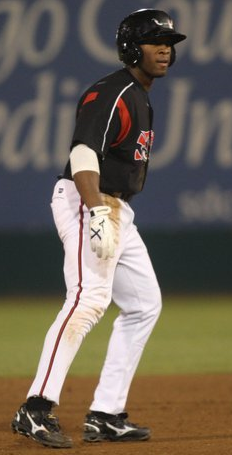
- Olabisi playing for the Lake Elsinore Storm in 2011
- Outfielder
- Born: March 18, 1988 (age 38); Lagos, Nigeria
- Bats: Right Throws: Right

Babawande Onaolapo Olabisi (born March 18, 1988) is a former professional baseball player. He played professionally in the San Diego Padres organization. He played college baseball at Stanford University. Olabisi is the first Nigerian-born player to be selected in the MLB First-Year Player Draft and the first to play affiliated baseball.

== Early life ==
Olabisi was born in Lagos, Nigeria to Olagoke Olabisi and Juliet Olabisi. At the age of 5, the Olabisi Family moved to the ARAMCO compound in Dhahran, Saudi Arabia. In 2000, Olabisi represented the country in the Little League World Series where he was selected for the All-Star game and Home Run Derby. Olabisi attended St. Stephen's Episcopal School in Austin, Texas where he was a four-sport athlete (baseball, football, soccer, and track). After high school, Olabisi attended Stanford University where he was called "probably the greatest athlete I've ever had" by Stanford Cardinal baseball head coach, Mark Marquess. As a sophomore in 2008, Olabisi was a member of the Cardinal team that rose to No. 3 in the national rankings and competed in the 2008 College World Series.

Olabisi graduated with an undergraduate degree in Biomechanical Engineering and a graduate degree in Management Science and Engineering.

== Professional baseball ==
Olabisi was selected by the San Diego Padres in the 2009 First-year player draft. The Padres recognized Olabisi as one of the top athletes in the draft. After his rookie season with the AZL Padres, Olabisi was regarded as a top prospect by MLB Prospect Guide. Olabisi's final two seasons were played with the Fort Wayne TinCaps and the Lake Elsinore Storm. During his professional baseball career, Olabisi's off-season activities included the design and development of low-cost high-efficiency medical devices for use in developing countries.

== Subsequent career ==
Since retiring from professional baseball, Olabisi has attended and graduated from Harvard Business School. He has commenced a career in the business management and investing sectors, working at the consulting firm McKinsey & Company and subsequently joined Altamont Capital Partners as an Investment Professional.
