= Henry Godbout =

American baseball player (born 2003)

Boston Red Sox – No. 18
- Second baseman / Shortstop
- Born: November 6, 2003 (age 22); New York City, New York, U.S.
- Bats: Right Throws: Right

Henry Bachner Godbout (born November 6, 2003) is an American professional baseball second baseman and shortstop in the Boston Red Sox organization. He was selected by the Red Sox as a compensatory pick between the second and third rounds of the 2025 MLB draft, and previously played college baseball for the Virginia Cavaliers.

== Amateur career ==
Godbout attended Baylor School in Chattanooga, Tennessee, and in 2022 was named Mr. Baseball for the state of Tennessee, prep baseball player of the year for Tennessee, and American Baseball Coaches Association (ABCA) Region 4 All-Region First Team. That summer, he played second base and shortstop for the Vermont Lake Monsters of the Futures Collegiate Baseball League, hitting .438/.486/.469 with four runs, 14 hits, and 10 runs batted in (RBI) in 32 at bats. On June 9, Godbout went 3-for-3 including hitting a two run single to propel Vermont to a 10th straight win.

As a freshman at the University of Virginia in 2023, Godbout posted a slash line of .286/.376/.413 over 56 games played, with three home runs, 38 RBIs, and nine stolen bases without being caught, across 222 plate appearances. He went on to play collegiate summer baseball for the Kalamazoo Growlers of the Northwoods League, with whom he batted .338/.404/.525 in 80 at bats,

In 2024, Godbout played 51 games for the Virginia Cavaliers, slashing .372(6th in the ACC)/.472(6th)/.645 with 9 home runs and 47 RBI over 217 plate appearances, while walking 29 times and striking out only 20 times. He was named to the All-ACC Third Team at the end of the regular season and earned Charlottesville Regional All-Tournament honors. This was followed by a summer playing for the Harwich Mariners of the Cape Cod Baseball League, who went on to win the league championship with a 2–1 series victory over the Bourne Braves, and for whom he batted 306/306/.472 in 36 at bats.In his standout 2024 sophomore season at Virginia, Godbout lead the Cavaliers in average while earning Baseball America Second Team All-America recognition .

In 2025, Godbout was a consensus 2025 Preseason First Team All-American. He slashed .309/.397/.497 with 8 home runs and 37 RBIs across 50 games played and 226 plate appearances, as well as 26 walks but only 19 strikeouts, and was a top 100 prospect ahead of the 2025 MLB draft, ranked at number 72. He was named to the 2025 All-ACC Second Team. But he entered the transfer portal after Cavaliers coach Brian O'Connor departed for Mississippi State and declined to announce his transfer commitment prior to the draft.

== Professional career ==
On July 13, 2025, Godbout was selected in the draft by the Boston Red Sox as a Compensatory round pick—between the second and third rounds—as the 75th draft pick overall. The Red Sox agreed to terms with Godbout on July 22, with a bonus of $1.09 million.

Godbout was assigned to Greenville Drive on August 6 and made his debut for the team the same day in their game against the Atlanta Braves-affiliated Rome Emperors, playing second base. He reached base five times, going 2 for 3 with two singles and three walks including a game-tying walk in the bottom of the ninth inning. Greenville went on to win the game in a 9–8 walkoff victory. By the end of his first week, Godbout went 4 for 12 with two doubles, and recorded four scored runs, two runs batted in, six walks and two strikeouts. By August, Godbout was ranked by MLB at number 19 in the Red Sox' top 30 prospects. In 2025 for Greenville, he batted .341/.473/.477 in 44 at bats.

On March 19, 2026, Godbout was announced to the roster for the Red Sox' "Spring Breakout" game against the Baltimore Orioles' farm system. An exhibition game between each teams' top prospects, Godbout was assigned to play second base in the game scheduled for March 20.

== Personal life ==
Godbout's father is David Godbout. His father is from New England area, and Godbout grew up a fan of the Boston Red Sox.
