= Chase Shores =

American baseball player (born 2004)

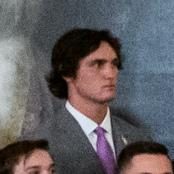
- Shores in 2025

Los Angeles Angels
- Pitcher
- Born: May 21, 2004 (age 22); Clovis, New Mexico, U.S.
- Bats: Right Throws: Right

Robert Chase Shores (born May 21, 2004) is an American professional baseball pitcher in the Los Angeles Angels organization. He played college baseball for the LSU Tigers. The Angels drafted Shores in the second round of the 2025 MLB draft.

== College career ==
Shores attended Lee High School in Midland, Texas. Shores posted an 18–2 career high school record with 211 strikeouts in 142 innings, while in his senior season worked 72 innings, recording an 8–2 mark and 123 strikeouts. Shores was the No. 1 ranked right-handed pitcher in Texas, number two overall in Texas for Class of 2022 by Perfect Game Baseball; played in Perfect Game All-American Classic while being ranked nationally as the No. 23 overall prospect and the No. 5 right-handed pitcher by Perfect Game Baseball. He committed to Louisiana State University (LSU) to play college baseball.

Shores missed his entire sophomore season in 2024 after undergoing Tommy John surgery. In 2025, he went 5–3 with a 5.51 ERA but he was a crucial reliever down the stretch in the Tigers’ run to the national title. He pitched the final innings in LSU's Game 2 National Championship win over Coastal Carolina, allowing only one hit and striking out four.

== Professional career ==
The Los Angeles Angels drafted Shores in the second round (47th overall) of the 2025 Major League Baseball draft. He signed with the organization on July 17 for the slot value of the 47th pick, listed at $2.08 million.

On April 7, 2026, Shores made his professional debut with the High-A affiliate Tri-City Dust Devils. He made 16 appearances as a starting pitcher, posting a 4.83 ERA with 67 strikeouts and 31 walks in 63.1 innings pitched.
