= Eli Willits =

American baseball player (born 2007)

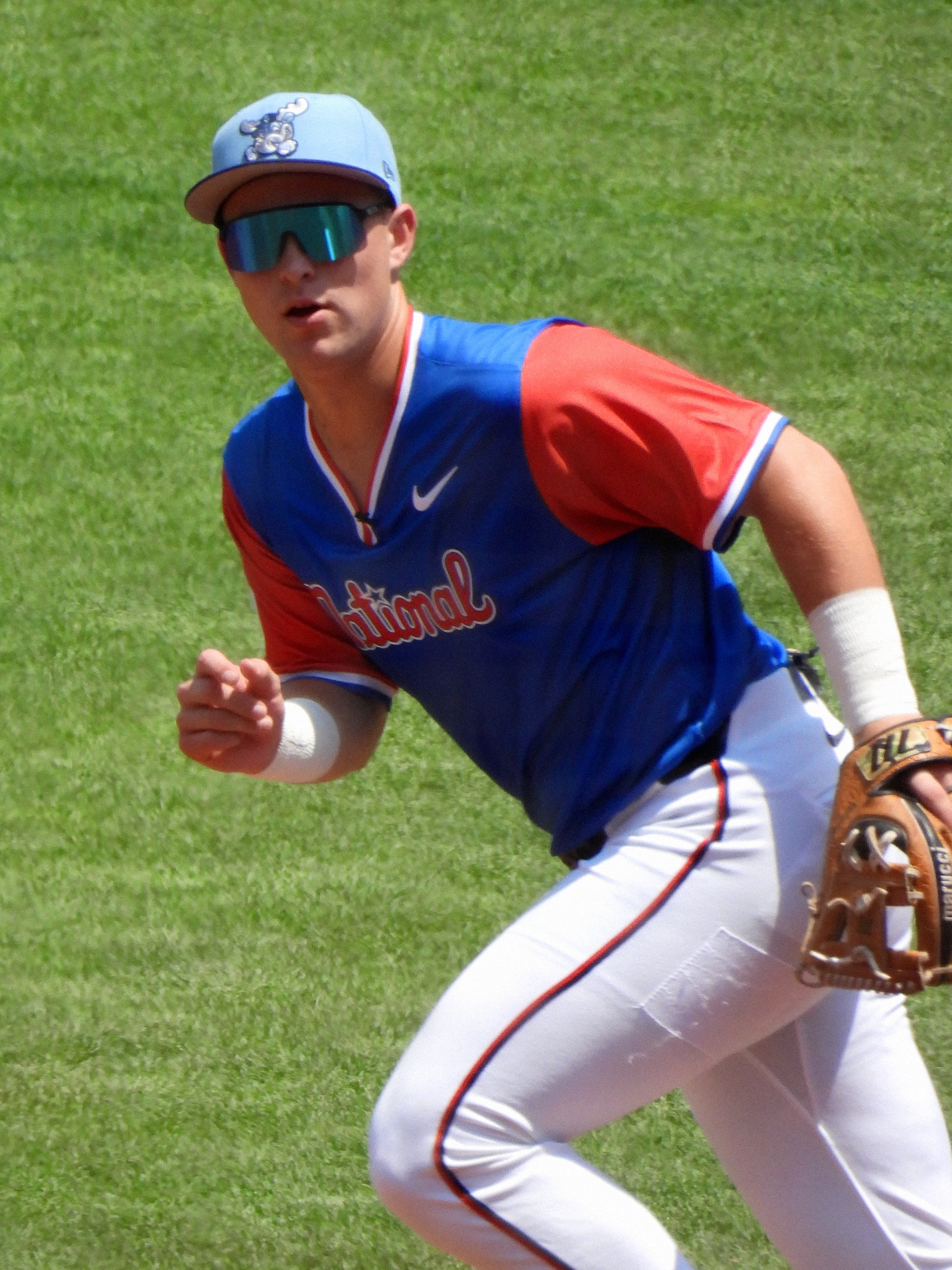
- Willits playing in the All-Star Futures Game in 2026

Washington Nationals
- Shortstop
- Born: December 9, 2007 (age 18); Lawton, Oklahoma, U.S.
- Bats: Switch Throws: Right
- Stats at Baseball Reference

Eli Willits (born December 9, 2007) is an American professional baseball shortstop in the Washington Nationals organization. He was drafted first overall by the Nationals in the 2025 MLB draft.

== Amateur career ==
Willits attended Fort Cobb-Broxton High School in Fort Cobb, Oklahoma. In the summer of 2024, he played for the USA Baseball 18U team. As a senior in 2025, he was The Oklahoman’s 2025 All-State Player of the Year after hitting .516 with nine home runs, 33 runs batted in (RBI) and 48 stolen bases.

Willits reclassified from the 2026 to 2025 class. He was a top prospect for the 2025 Major League Baseball draft. He committed to play college baseball at the University of Oklahoma.

== Professional career ==
In the 2025 MLB draft, Willits was selected first overall by the Washington Nationals, becoming the third-youngest player in MLB draft history to be selected first overall. He signed with Washington for a below-slot $8.2 million signing bonus on July 19, 2025.

Willits made his professional debut with the Single-A Fredericksburg Nationals and hit .300 with five RBI across 15 games. He debuted in the MLB Pipeline Top 100 Prospects List at number 18. He returned to Fredericksburg to open the 2026 season. In the June 2026 MLB Pipeline List update, Willits moved up to number 3 in the rankings. He was announced to play in the 2026 MLB All-Star Futures Game in Philadelphia.

== Personal life ==
Willits is the son of Amber Klugh and Reggie Willits, who played in Major League Baseball (MLB).
