= Miguel Sime Jr. =

American baseball player (born 2007)

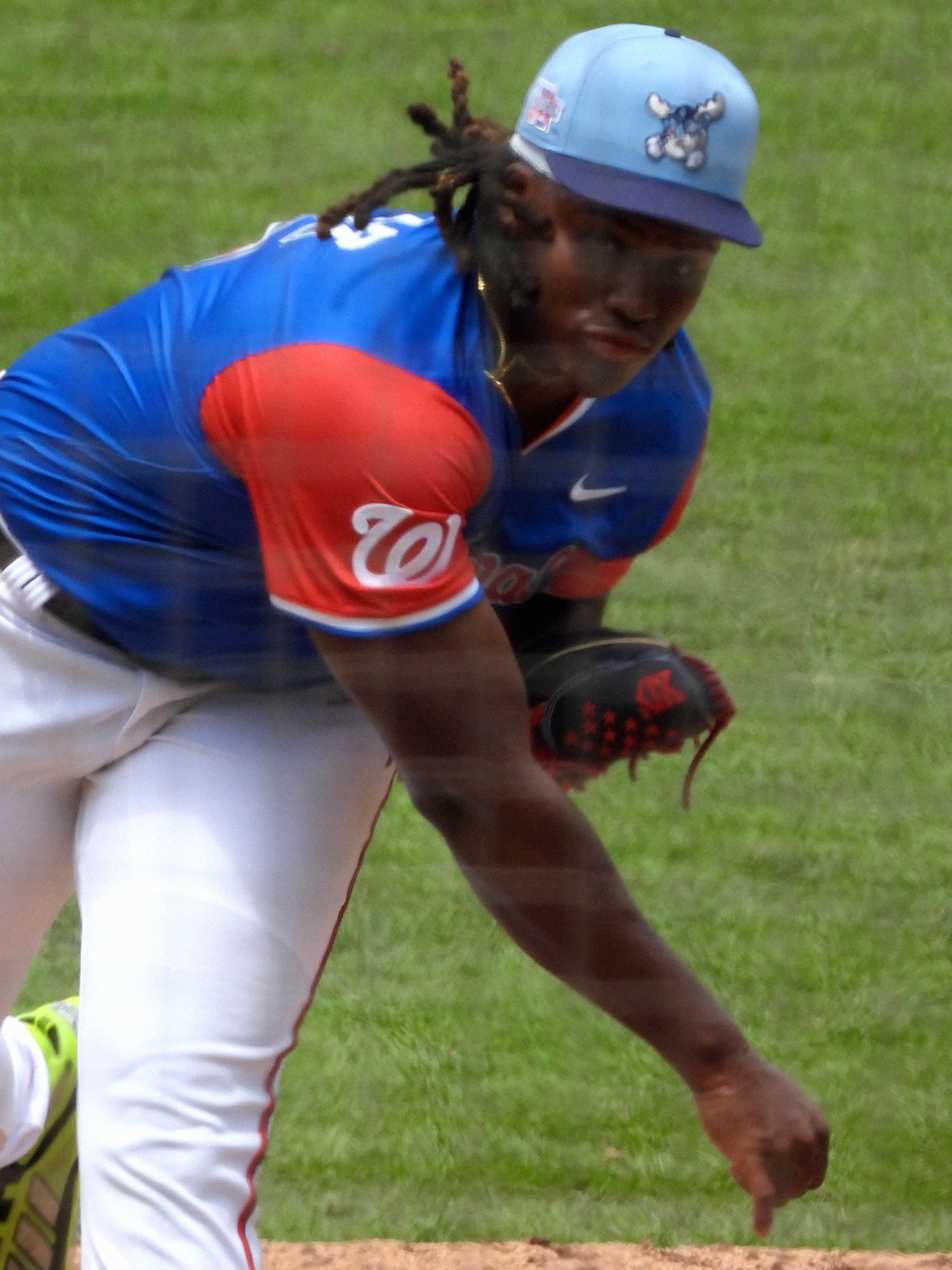
- Sime Jr. pitching for the National League Futures in 2026

Washington Nationals
- Pitcher
- Born: May 8, 2007 (age 19); Cambridge, Massachusetts
- Bats: Right Throws: Right

Miguel Angel Sime Jr. (born May 8, 2007) is an American professional baseball pitcher in the Washington Nationals organization. He was selected with the 111th pick in the fourth round by the Nationals in the 2025 MLB draft.

== Amateur career ==
Sime Jr. attended Poly Prep Country Day School in Brooklyn, New York. Sime averaged over 95 mph with his fastball throughout the summer and routinely reached up to 100 mph, reaching those velocities in his junior and senior seasons. Sime Jr. was a top prospect for the 2025 Major League Baseball draft. He committed to play college baseball at Louisiana State University.

== Professional career ==
Sime Jr. was selected by the Washington Nationals in the fourth round of the 2025 MLB draft. He signed with the team for $2 million.

On 5 April 2026, Sime Jr made his professional debut with the Fredericksburg Nationals. On 1 June, he was promoted to High-A Wilmington. He was announced to play in the 2026 MLB All-Star Futures Game in Philadelphia.
