= Ethan Conrad =

American baseball player (born 2004)

Chicago Cubs
- Outfielder
- Born: July 5, 2004 (age 22); Saugerties, New York, U.S.
- Bats: Left Throws: Left

Ethan William Conrad (born July 5, 2004) is an American professional baseball outfielder in the Chicago Cubs organization. He was selected by the Cubs in the first round of the 2025 MLB draft.

== Career ==
Conrad graduated from Saugerties High School and started his college baseball career at Marist College. In 2024, he led the Metro Atlantic Athletic Conference (MAAC) in extra base hits and was named First Team All-MAAC. That summer, he played collegiate summer baseball with the Bourne Braves of the Cape Cod Baseball League. He transferred to Wake Forest University prior to his junior season in 2025.

Conrad played only 21 games his junior season at Wake Forest in 2025, due to injury. He was drafted by the Chicago Cubs in the first round, with the 17th overall selection, of the 2025 Major League Baseball draft. On July 18, 2025, Conrad signed with the Cubs for a $3.5 million signing bonus.
