= 2025 Major League Baseball draft =

General information
- Sport: Baseball
- Date: July 13–14, 2025
- Location: Coca-Cola Roxy; Cumberland, Georgia
- Networks: MLB Network (first three rounds); ESPN (first round); MLB.com

Overview
- 615 total selections in 20 rounds
- League: Major League Baseball
- First selection: Eli Willits; Washington Nationals
- First round selections: 43

The 2025 Major League Baseball draft took place on July 13–14, 2025, in Cumberland, Georgia. The draft assigns amateur baseball players from the United States, Canada, and Puerto Rico to Major League Baseball teams.

The first six selections were set via a lottery, with first round picks belonging to the remaining lottery participants set in reverse order of regular season winning percentage. To complete the first round, playoff teams selected in an order that combined postseason finish, revenue sharing status, and reverse order of winning percentage. Reverse order of regular season winning percentage and postseason finish were used to set the draft order for rounds two through 20.

The Washington Nationals won the draft lottery and the first overall selection. The Kansas City Royals were awarded a Prospect Promotion Incentive Pick after Bobby Witt Jr. finished in the top three of American League Most Valuable Player voting.

== Draft lottery ==
The 2025 MLB Draft Lottery took place on December 10, 2024, in Dallas, Texas, during the Winter Meetings. The Chicago White Sox and Athletics were ineligible to participate in the lottery, as per a rule in the collective bargaining agreement between Major League Baseball (MLB) and MLB Players Association that limits teams in larger markets from winning draft lottery picks in consecutive seasons, as well as limits teams in smaller markets from winning draft lottery picks 3 seasons in a row. The following table lists the percentage chances for each seed to receive lottery picks as a result of the draft lottery.

Denotes lottery winner
Denotes team that did not win lottery
Ineligible to receive lottery pick

Seed	Team	1st	2nd	3rd	4th	5th	6th
1	Colorado Rockies	22.4%	21.1%	19.4%	17.4%	15.0%	12.2%
2	Miami Marlins	22.4%	21.1%	19.4%	17.4%	15.0%	12.2%
3	Los Angeles Angels	18.0%	17.7%	17.2%	16.3%	15.1%	13.4%
4	Washington Nationals	10.2%	10.8%	11.3%	12.0%	12.7%	13.1%
5	Toronto Blue Jays	7.5%	8.1%	8.7%	9.5%	10.3%	11.5%
6	Pittsburgh Pirates	5.3%	5.8%	6.4%	7.1%	8.0%	9.2%
7	Cincinnati Reds	3.7%	4.0%	4.5%	5.1%	6.0%	6.9%
8	Texas Rangers	2.4%	2.7%	3.1%	3.6%	4.1%	4.9%
9	San Francisco Giants	1.9%	2.2%	2.4%	2.8%	3.2%	3.9%
N/A	Chicago White Sox	∅					
N/A	Athletics	∅					
10	Tampa Bay Rays	1.5%	1.6%	1.9%	2.2%	2.6%	3.2%
11	Boston Red Sox	1.2%	1.3%	1.6%	1.8%	2.2%	2.5%
12	Minnesota Twins	1.1%	1.2%	1.3%	1.6%	1.8%	2.1%
13	St. Louis Cardinals	0.8%	0.9%	1.1%	1.3%	1.6%	1.8%
14	Chicago Cubs	0.7%	0.7%	0.8%	0.9%	1.2%	1.4%
15	Seattle Mariners	0.5%	0.5%	0.7%	0.8%	0.9%	1.0%
16	Arizona Diamondbacks	0.3%	0.4%	0.4%	0.5%	0.5%	0.6%

== Draft selections ==
The Dodgers, Mets, and Yankees exceeded the surcharge tax threshold in 2024, meaning that each had their first-round draft pick moved back ten slots.

Key
	All-Star
*	Player did not sign

=== First round ===
Pick	Player	Team	Position	School
1	Eli Willits	Washington Nationals	Shortstop	Fort Cobb-Broxton HS (OK)
2	Tyler Bremner	Los Angeles Angels	Pitcher	UC Santa Barbara
3	Kade Anderson	Seattle Mariners	Pitcher	LSU
4	Ethan Holliday	Colorado Rockies	Shortstop	Stillwater HS (OK)
5	Liam Doyle	St. Louis Cardinals	Pitcher	Tennessee
6	Seth Hernandez	Pittsburgh Pirates	Pitcher	Corona HS (CA)
7	Aiva Arquette	Miami Marlins	Shortstop	Oregon State
8	JoJo Parker	Toronto Blue Jays	Shortstop	Purvis HS (MS)
9	Steele Hall	Cincinnati Reds	Shortstop	Hewitt-Trussville HS (AL)
10	Billy Carlson	Chicago White Sox	Shortstop	Corona HS (CA)
11	Jamie Arnold	Athletics	Pitcher	Florida State
12	Gavin Fien	Texas Rangers	Third baseman	Great Oak HS (CA)
13	Gavin Kilen	San Francisco Giants	Shortstop	Tennessee
14	Daniel Pierce	Tampa Bay Rays	Shortstop	Mill Creek HS (GA)
15	Kyson Witherspoon	Boston Red Sox	Pitcher	Oklahoma
16	Marek Houston	Minnesota Twins	Shortstop	Wake Forest
17	Ethan Conrad	Chicago Cubs	Outfielder	Wake Forest
18	Kayson Cunningham	Arizona Diamondbacks	Shortstop	Johnson HS (TX)
19	Ike Irish	Baltimore Orioles	Catcher	Auburn
20	Andrew Fischer	Milwaukee Brewers	Third baseman	Tennessee
21	Xavier Neyens	Houston Astros	Shortstop	Mount Vernon HS (WA)
22	Tate Southisene	Atlanta Braves	Shortstop	Basic HS (NV)
23	Sean Gamble	Kansas City Royals	Outfielder	IMG Academy (FL)
24	Jordan Yost	Detroit Tigers	Shortstop	Sickles HS (FL)
25	Kruz Schoolcraft	San Diego Padres	Pitcher	Sunset HS (OR)
26	Gage Wood	Philadelphia Phillies	Pitcher	Arkansas
27	Jace LaViolette	Cleveland Guardians	Outfielder	Texas A&M

=== Prospect promotion incentive picks ===
Pick	Player	Team	Position	School
28	Josh Hammond	Kansas City Royals (Note: Received for Bobby Witt Jr. finishing in top 3 of American League Most Valuable Player voting)	Shortstop	Wesleyan Christian Academy (NC)

=== Compensatory round ===
Pick	Player	Team	Position	School
29	Patrick Forbes	Arizona Diamondbacks (Note: Compensation pick for the Houston Astros signing Christian Walker)	Pitcher	Louisville
30	Caden Bodine	Baltimore Orioles (Note: Compensation pick for the Arizona Diamondbacks signing Corbin Burnes)	Catcher	Coastal Carolina
31	Wehiwa Aloy	Baltimore Orioles (Note: Compensation pick for the Toronto Blue Jays signing Anthony Santander)	Shortstop	Arkansas
32	Brady Ebel	Milwaukee Brewers (Note: Compensation pick for the San Francisco Giants signing Willy Adames)	Shortstop	Corona HS (CA)

=== Competitive balance round A ===
Pick	Player	Team	Position	School
33	Marcus Phillips	Boston Red Sox (Note: The Red Sox acquired a Competitive Balance Round A pick from the Brewers as part of the April 7 trade that sent pitcher Quinn Priester to the Brewers. In addition to the draft pick, the Red Sox received minor-league outfielder Yophery Rodriguez and a player to be named later, later confirmed to be John Holobetz.)	Pitcher	Tennessee
34	Michael Oliveto	Detroit Tigers	Catcher	Hauppauge HS (NY)
35	Luke Stevenson	Seattle Mariners	Catcher	North Carolina
36	Riley Quick	Minnesota Twins	Pitcher	Alabama
37	Slater de Brun	Baltimore Orioles (Note: The Orioles acquired a Competitive Balance Round A pick from the Rays as part of the July 10 trade that sent reliever Bryan Baker to the Rays.)	Outfielder	Summit HS (OR)
38	Mitch Voit	New York Mets	Infielder	Michigan
39	Dax Kilby	New York Yankees	Shortstop	Newnan HS (GA)
40	Zach Root	Los Angeles Dodgers	Pitcher	Arkansas
41	Charles Davalan	Los Angeles Dodgers (Note: The Dodgers acquired a Competitive Balance Round A pick and Minor League outfielder Mike Sirota from the Reds for Gavin Lux.)	Outfielder	Arkansas
42	Brendan Summerhill	Tampa Bay Rays (Note: The Rays acquired a Competitive Balance Round A pick, Joe Boyle, Will Simpson, and Jacob Watters from the Athletics for Jeffrey Springs and Jacob Lopez.)	Outfielder	Arizona
43	Cam Cannarella	Miami Marlins	Outfielder	Clemson

=== Second round ===
Pick	Player	Team	Position	School
44	Jaden Fauske	Chicago White Sox	Outfielder	Nazareth Academy (IL)
45	JB Middleton	Colorado Rockies	Pitcher	Southern Mississippi
46	Brandon Compton	Miami Marlins	Outfielder	Arizona State
47	Chase Shores	Los Angeles Angels	Pitcher	LSU
48	Devin Taylor	Athletics	Outfielder	Indiana
49	Ethan Petry	Washington Nationals	Outfielder	South Carolina
50	Angel Cervantes*	Pittsburgh Pirates	Pitcher	Warren HS (CA)
51	Aaron Watson	Cincinnati Reds	Pitcher	Trinity Christian Academy (FL)
52	AJ Russell	Texas Rangers	Pitcher	Tennessee
53	Cooper Flemming	Tampa Bay Rays	Shortstop	Ganesha HS (CA)
54	Quentin Young	Minnesota Twins	Shortstop	Oaks Christian HS (CA)
55	Ryan Mitchell	St. Louis Cardinals	Outfielder	Houston HS (TN)
56	Kane Kepley	Chicago Cubs	Outfielder	North Carolina
57	Nick Becker	Seattle Mariners	Shortstop	Don Bosco Prep HS (NJ)
58	Joseph Dzierwa	Baltimore Orioles	Pitcher	Michigan State
59	J.D. Thompson	Milwaukee Brewers	Pitcher	Vanderbilt
60	Alex Lodise	Atlanta Braves	Shortstop	Florida State
61	Michael Lombardi	Kansas City Royals	Pitcher	Tulane
62	Malachi Witherspoon	Detroit Tigers	Pitcher	Oklahoma
63	Cade Obermueller	Philadelphia Phillies	Pitcher	Iowa
64	Dean Curley	Cleveland Guardians	Shortstop	Tennessee
65	Cam Leiter	Los Angeles Dodgers	Pitcher	Florida State

=== Competitive balance round B ===
Pick	Player	Team	Position	School
66	Aaron Walton	Cleveland Guardians	Outfielder	Arizona
67	Dean Moss	Tampa Bay Rays	Outfielder	IMG Academy (FL)
68	Frank Cairone	Milwaukee Brewers	Pitcher	Delsea Reg HS (NJ)
69	JT Quinn	Baltimore Orioles	Pitcher	Georgia
70	Will Hynes	Cleveland Guardians (Note: The Guardians acquired a Competitive Balance Round B pick and pitcher Slade Cecconi from the Diamondbacks for Josh Naylor.)	Pitcher	Lorne Park SS (Canada)
71	Justin Lamkin	Kansas City Royals	Pitcher	Texas A&M
72	Tanner Franklin	St. Louis Cardinals	Pitcher	Tennessee
73	Murf Gray	Pittsburgh Pirates	Third baseman	Fresno State
74	Max Belyeu	Colorado Rockies	Outfielder	Texas

=== Compensatory round ===
Pick	Player	Team	Position	School
75	Henry Godbout	Boston Red Sox (Note: The Red Sox received a Compensatory round pick for the Padres signing Nick Pivetta.)	Shortstop	Virginia

=== Other notable selections ===
Round	Pick	Player	Team	Position	School
3	76	Kyle Lodise	Chicago White Sox	Shortstop	Georgia Tech
3	79	Johnny Slawinski	Los Angeles Angels	Pitcher	Lyndon B. Johnson High School (TX)
3	80	Landon Harmon	Washington Nationals	Pitcher	East Union High School (MS)
3	81	Jake Cook	Toronto Blue Jays	Outfielder	Southern Mississippi
3	82	Easton Carmichael	Pittsburgh Pirates	Catcher	Oklahoma
3	85	Trevor Cohen	San Francisco Giants	Outfielder	Rutgers
3	86	Taitn Gray	Tampa Bay Rays	Catcher	Dallas Center–Grimes High School (IA)
3	87	Anthony Eyanson	Boston Red Sox	Pitcher	LSU
3	89	Jack Gurevitch	St. Louis Cardinals	First baseman	San Diego
3	94	Jacob Morrison	Milwaukee Brewers	Pitcher	Coastal Carolina
3	95	Ethan Frey	Houston Astros	Outfielder	LSU
3	98	Ben Jacobs	Detroit Tigers	Pitcher	Arizona State
3	101	Nolan Schubart	Cleveland Guardians	Outfielder	Oklahoma State
3	103	Kaeden Kent	New York Yankees	Shortstop	Texas A&M
3	105	Nate Snead	Los Angeles Angels	Pitcher	Tennessee
4	109	Jake Munroe	Los Angeles Angels	Third baseman	Louisville
4	110	Gavin Turley	Athletics	Outfielder	Oregon State
4	111	Miguel Sime Jr.	Washington Nationals	Pitcher	Poly Prep Country Day School (NY)
4	112	Micah Bucknam	Toronto Blue Jays	Pitcher	Dallas Baptist University
4	114	Mason Neville	Cincinnati Reds	Outfielder	Oregon
4	118	Mason White	Boston Red Sox	Shortstop	Arizona
4	121	Kaleb Wing	Chicago Cubs	Pitcher	Scotts Valley High School (CA)
4	122	Mason Peters	Seattle Mariners	Pitcher	Dallas Baptist
4	127	Briggs McKenzie	Atlanta Braves	Pitcher	Corinth Holders High School (NC)
4	132	Luke Hill	Cleveland Guardians	Third baseman	Ole Miss
5	140	C. J. Gray	Los Angeles Angels	Pitcher	A.L. Brown High School (NC)
5	147	James Quinn-Irons	Tampa Bay Rays	Outfielder	George Mason
5	152	Korbyn Dickerson	Seattle Mariners	Outfielder	Indiana
5	154	Jaiden Lo Re	Baltimore Orioles	Shortstop	Corona Del Sol High School (AZ)
5	157	Conor Essenburg	Atlanta Braves	Outfielder	Lincoln-Way West High School (IL)
5	164	Core Jackson	New York Yankees	Shortstop	Utah
6	166	Colby Shelton	Chicago White Sox	Shortstop	Florida
6	171	Boston Smith	Washington Nationals	Catcher	Wright State
6	179	Bruin Agbayani	Minnesota Twins	Shortstop	Saint Louis School (HI)
6	181	Josiah Hartshorn	Chicago Cubs	Outfielder	Orange Lutheran High School (CA)
6	184	Caden Hunter	Baltimore Orioles	Pitcher	USC
6	185	Daniel Dickinson	Milwaukee Brewers	Second baseman	LSU
6	194	Rory Fox	New York Yankees	Pitcher	Notre Dame
7	196	Anthony DePino	Chicago White Sox	Third baseman	Rhode Island
7	199	Lucas Mahlstedt	Los Angeles Angels	Pitcher	Clemson
7	215	Josiah Ragsdale	Milwaukee Brewers	Outfielder	Boston College
7	225	Mason Estrada	Los Angeles Dodgers	Pitcher	MIT
8	241	Jake Knapp	Chicago Cubs	Pitcher	North Carolina
9	282	Ryan Prager	Cleveland Guardians	Pitcher	Texas A&M
10	289	Nick Rodriguez	Los Angeles Angels	Second baseman	Missouri State
10	302	Isaac Lyon	Seattle Mariners	Pitcher	Grand Canyon
11	344	Ben Grable	New York Yankees	Pitcher	Indiana
12	349	Talon Haley	Los Angeles Angels	Pitcher	Lewisburg High School (MS)
13	379	Xavier Mitchell	Los Angeles Angels	Pitcher	Prestonwood Christian Academy (TX)
14	414	Bryce Archie	Cincinnati Reds	Pitcher	South Florida
14	430	Clay Edmondson	San Diego Padres	Pitcher	UNC Asheville
15	464	Jack Cebert	New York Yankees	Pitcher	Texas Tech
17	525	Sam Horn	Los Angeles Dodgers	Pitcher	Missouri

== Notes ==
Incentive picks

Compensation picks

Trades
