= Korbyn Dickerson =

American baseball player (born 2003)

Seattle Mariners
- Outfielder
- Born: October 30, 2003 (age 23); Louisville, Kentucky, U.S.
- Bats: Right Throws: Right

Korbyn Alfonso Dickerson (born October 30, 2003) is an American professional baseball outfielder in the Seattle Mariners organization.

== Amateur career ==
Dickerson attended Trinity High School in Louisville, Kentucky, where he played baseball. As a junior in 2021, he hit .412 with 12 home runs and 59 RBI. As a senior in 2022, he batted .481 with 11 home runs and 57 RBI. Dickerson was selected by the Minnesota Twins in the 20th round of the 2022 Major League Baseball draft, but did not sign and instead honored his commitment to play college baseball at the University of Louisville for the Louisville Cardinals.

Dickerson did not make an appearance for Louisville as a freshman in 2023, and redshirted the season. As a redshirt freshman in 2024, he appeared in 21 games and hit .235 with no home runs and three RBI. After the season, he transferred to Indiana University to play college baseball for the Indiana Hoosiers. He was named to the midseason Golden Spikes Award watch list. Over 56 games for the Hoosiers in 2025, Dickerson hit .314 with 19 home runs and 77 RBI.

== Professional career ==
Dickerson was selected with the 152nd pick in the fifth round of the 2025 Major League Baseball draft by the Seattle Mariners. He signed with the team for $461,000.

After signing with the Mariners, Dickerson made his professional debut with the Single-A Modesto Nuts with whom he played in two games and hit .429. He was assigned to the Single-A Inland Empire 66ers to start the 2026 season and was promoted to the High-A Everett AquaSox in July. For July, he was also named the Mariners Minor League Baserunner of the Month after going 9 of 11 on stolen base attempts between Inland Empire and Everett. Across 107 games between the two teams, Dickerson hit .274 with 15 home runs, 53 RBI, and 35 stolen bases.
