= Zachary Root =

American baseball player (born 2004)

Los Angeles Dodgers
- Pitcher
- Born: February 6, 2004 (age 22); Fort Myers, Florida, U.S.
- Bats: Left Throws: Left

Zachary Bishop Root (born February 6, 2004) is an American professional baseball pitcher in the Los Angeles Dodgers organization. He played college baseball for the East Carolina Pirates and Arkansas Razorbacks.

== Career ==
=== Amateur career ===
Root attended Fort Myers High School in Fort Myers, Florida. As a senior in 2022, he went 6-2 with a 1.50 ERA alongside hitting .346. He participated in the 2022 MLB Draft Combine, but went unselected in the 2022 Major League Baseball draft. He enrolled at East Carolina University to play college baseball.

As a freshman at East Carolina in 2023, Root appeared in twenty games (making 13 starts) in which he went 3-3 with a 5.53 ERA over 53 2/3 innings. That summer, he played in the Valley Baseball League for the Charlottesville Tom Sox. As a sophomore in 2024, Root started 12 games and pitched to a 6-2 record, a 3.56 ERA, and 76 strikeouts over 68 1/3 innings. After the season, he transferred to the University of Arkansas to play for the Razorbacks. Root made 19 starts for Arkansas in 2025 and went 9-6 with a 3.62 ERA and 126 strikeouts over 99 1/3 innings.

=== Los Angeles Dodgers ===
Root was selected by the Los Angeles Dodgers with the 40th overall pick in the 2025 Major League Baseball draft. Root signed with the Dodgers on July 24, 2025, for a $2.2 million signing bonus. The Dodgers assigned him to the Great Lakes Loons of the Midwest League to make his professional debut in 2026. He earned league all-star honors with a 3–3 record, 2.40 ERA and 79 strikeouts in 15 starts. He was promoted to the Double-A Tulsa Drillers of the Texas League at the end of the season, and made four starts, allowing 14 runs in 16 1/3 innings for a 7.71 ERA.
