= Nick Becker (baseball) =

American baseball player (born 2006)

Seattle Mariners
- Shortstop
- Born: December 4, 2006 (age 19); Suffern, New York, U.S.
- Bats: Right Throws: Right

Nicholas Becker (born December 4, 2006) is an American professional baseball shortstop in the Seattle Mariners organization. He was drafted 57th overall by the Mariners in the 2025 MLB draft.

== Career ==
Becker batted .386 with 12 doubles, three triples, five home runs, 24 walks, and 27 stolen bases in 35 games at Don Bosco Prep. He had a .558 OBP, slugging .761 for a 1.319 OPS in his 2025 senior season. In 95 career high school games, Becker hit .407 with 31 doubles, six triples, seven home runs, 79 RBI, 65 walks, 67 stolen bases, and a 1.251 OPS across three years, winning 2025 Gatorade New Jersey Baseball Player of the Year. Becker helped lead the Don Bosco Prep Ironmen to a 77–10 overall record in his high school career.

Becker was ranked the 59th best player in the country by Perfect Game Baseball, while also being the third best player and best shortstop in New York for the Class of 2025. Becker was a top prospect for the 2025 MLB draft, as shown by MLB ranking him the 51st best prospect in the draft. He was committed to play college baseball at the University of Virginia.

Becker was drafted in the second round, with the 57th overall selection, by the Seattle Mariners in the 2025 Major League Baseball draft. On July 19, 2025, Becker signed with the Mariners for a $2.75 million signing bonus.

== Personal ==
Nick's brother, Eric, is an infielder in the Cincinnati Reds organization.
