= Jordan Yost =

American baseball player (born 2006)

Detroit Tigers
- Shortstop
- Born: December 21, 2006 (age 19); Tampa, Florida, U.S.
- Bats: Left Throws: Right

Jordan Lee Yost (born December 21, 2006) is an American professional baseball shortstop in the Detroit Tigers organization. He was selected by the Tigers in the first round of the 2025 MLB draft.

== Amateur career ==
Yost attended Sickles High School in Citrus Park, Florida. As a senior in 2025, he batted .420 with four home runs and 26 RBI. After the season, he participated in the MLB Draft Combine at Chase Field. He committed to play college baseball at the University of Florida. The day of the draft, Perfect Game Baseball ranked him the 65th best player in the country, while being third best player and best shortstop in Florida.

== Professional career ==
Yost was selected by the Detroit Tigers in the first round with the 24th overall selection in the 2025 Major League Baseball draft. On July 18, 2025, Yost signed with the Tigers for a signing bonus of $3.2 million.

Yost made his professional debut in 2026 with the Single-A Lakeland Flying Tigers. He played the entirety of the season with Lakeland and batted .252 with four home runs, 31 RBI, and 18 stolen bases across 83 games.

== Personal life ==
Yost's brother, Hayden, is an outfielder in the Seattle Mariners organization.
