= Kayson Cunningham =

American baseball player (born 2006)

Arizona Diamondbacks
- Shortstop
- Born: June 25, 2006 (age 20); Tucson, Arizona, U.S.
- Bats: Left Throws: Right
- Stats at Baseball Reference

Kayson Cunningham (born June 25, 2006) is an American professional baseball shortstop in the Arizona Diamondbacks organization.

== Amateur career ==
Cunningham attended Lady Bird Johnson High School in San Antonio, Texas. As a junior in 2024, he was named the San Antonio Express-News Player of the Year after hitting .437 with 36 stolen bases. He was also named the 2024 USA Baseball Player of the Year. During the summer of 2024, he played for the United States national under-18 baseball team. He was named the MVP of the World Cup Americas Qualifier after hitting .417 with 12 RBI. In August 2024, Cunningham played in the High School All-American Game at Petco Park. He committed to play college baseball at the University of Texas.

Entering his senior year in 2025, Cunningham was considered a top prospect for the upcoming MLB draft. As a senior in 2025, he hit .509 with 23 extra-base hits and 21 stolen bases and was named the Gatorade Texas Baseball Player of the Year.

== Professional career ==
Cunningham was drafted by the Arizona Diamondbacks with the 18th overall selection of the 2025 Major League Baseball draft. He signed with Arizona for a $4.58 million bonus on July 20, 2025. After signing, Cunningham made his professional debut with the Single-A Visalia Rawhide on August 19.
