= Arizona Complex League Padres =

- (1988–2000, 2004–present); Peoria, Arizona; previously in Scottsdale, Arizona (1988–1992)

Minor league affiliations
- Class: Rookie
- League: Arizona Complex League
- Division: West
- Previous leagues: Arizona League (1988–2000, 2004–2020)

Major league affiliations
- Team: San Diego Padres

Minor league titles
- League titles (2): 1996; 2006

Team data
- Name: ACL Padres
- Previous names: AZL Padres 1 & 2 (2017–2019); AZL Padres (1988–2000, 2004–2016)
- Ballpark: Peoria Sports Complex (1993–2000, 2004–present)
- Previous parks: Scottsdale Stadium (1988–1992)
- Owner/ Operator: San Diego Padres
- Manager: Miguel Del Castillo

The Arizona Complex League Padres or ACL Padres are a Minor League Baseball team based in Peoria, Arizona. The Padres compete in the Arizona Complex League as a rookie-level affiliate of the San Diego Padres. The team plays its home games at Peoria Sports Complex, which is also the spring training home of the major-league Padres. The team is composed mainly of players who are in their first year of professional baseball either as draftees or non-drafted free agents.

== History ==
The team first competed in the Arizona League (AZL) from 1988 to 2000. For the 1988–1992 seasons, the team played its home games at Scottsdale Stadium in Scottsdale. The team moved to Peoria and the Peoria Sports Complex in 1993.

After being absent from the league from 2001 through 2003, the team resumed operation in 2004 and has competed since then. In 2006, the team won the first-half title and went on to win the league championship by defeating the AZL Angels, 5–2. For the 2017–2019 seasons, the team fielded two squads in the league, differentiated by numerical suffixes (1 and 2). Prior to the 2021 season, the Arizona League was renamed as the Arizona Complex League (ACL).

== Rosters ==
Arizona Complex League Padres roster
Players	Coaches/Other
Pitchers: 99 Erick Batista; 46 Adler Cecil; -- Javier Chacon; -- Tyler Dietz; -- Nick Falter; 82 Joseph Herrera; -- Jamie Hitt; 76 Dane Lais; -- Brandon Langley; 89 Luis Maracara; 49 Rordy Mejia; -- Daichi Moriki; 60 Jose Ortega; 75 Dariel Polanco; -- Cal Riehl; -- Michael Salina; -- Tyler Schmitt; 34 Matthew Watson; Catchers: -- Jake Bold; 8 Jesus Castro; 80 Alcides Hernandez; 23 Jack Mathey; Infielders: -- Luis De Leon; 11 Ethan Long; 67 Yimy Tovar; -- Dawson Willis; Outfielders: 21 Jesmaylin Arias; -- Qrey Lott; -- Conner Westenburg	Manager: 24 Jhonaldo Pozo; Coaches: 15 Brian Betancourth (bench); 8 Nolan Earley (hitting); -- Ernesto Frieri (pitching); -- Yunir Garcia (hitting); 17 Yoel Monzon (rehab pitching); -- Jed Morris (hitting); 47 Leo Rosales (pitching); -- Scott Stroud (bench); 7-day injured list; * On San Diego Padres 40-man roster; ~ Development list; # Rehab assignment; ∞ Reserve list; ‡ Restricted list; § Suspended list; † Temporarily inactive list; Roster updated March 26, 2026; Transactions; → More rosters: MiLB • Arizona Complex League; → San Diego Padres minor league players

== Notable players ==
Notable players for the team include:

- Dylan Axelrod
- Cody Decker
- Max Fried
- Mat Latos
- Derrek Lee
- Jake Peavy
- Fernando Tatis Jr.
- Will Venable
