= Nolan Schubart =

American baseball player (born 2004)

Cleveland Guardians
- First baseman
- Born: May 10, 2004 (age 22); Detroit, Michigan U.S.
- Bats: Left Throws: Right
- Stats at Baseball Reference

Nolan Michael Schubart (born May 10, 2004) is an American professional baseball first baseman in the Cleveland Guardians organization.

== Amateur career ==
Schubart attended St. Mary's Preparatory in Orchard Lake Village, Michigan, where he played baseball. He originally committed to play college baseball for the Michigan Wolverines but later switched his commitment to the Oklahoma State Cowboys after a coaching change. As a senior at St. Mary's in 2022, he had a .354 batting average with 13 home runs and 42 runs batted in (RBI). He went unselected in the 2022 Major League Baseball draft and enrolled at Oklahoma State.

As a freshman at Oklahoma State in 2023, Schubart appeared in 61 games as the team's starting left fielder and batted .338 with 17 home runs and 74 RBI. In a game against East Tennessee State University, Schubart hit three home runs, including two grand slams, and had ten RBI. That summer, he played in the Cape Cod Baseball League for the Chatham Anglers and was named an All-Star. Schubart missed time at the beginning of the 2024 season due to a groin injury but later returned. In a game versus Wichita State University, Schubart hit four home runs in the game, setting the Oklahoma State single-game record. He finished the season with a .370 batting average, 23 home runs, and 68 RBI. He briefly played in the Cape Cod Baseball League for the Brewster Whitecaps. As a junior in 2025, Schubart played in 55 games and batted .300 with 19 home runs and 57 RBI.

== Professional career ==
Schubart was selected by the Cleveland Guardians in the third round with the 101st overall selection of the 2025 Major League Baseball draft. He signed with the team for $730,000. Schubart made his professional debut after signing with the Single-A Lynchburg Hillcats with whom he hit .255 with three home runs across 15 games.

Schubart was a non-roster invitee to 2026 spring training and was named to Cleveland's Spring Breakout roster. He was assigned to the High-A Lake County Captains to open the 2026 season and was named Midwest League Player of the Week in July. Schubart played in 75 games for Lake County and hit .243 with 20 home runs and 69 RBI before he was promoted to the Double-A Akron RubberDucks. Across 44 games with Akron, he batted .247 with 15 home runs and 40 RBI.
