= Daniel Dickinson (baseball) =

American baseball player (born 2003)

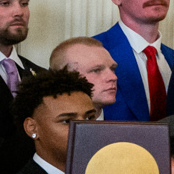
- Dickinson in 2025

Milwaukee Brewers
- Second baseman / Shortstop
- Born: December 5, 2003 (age 22); Bremerton, Washington, U.S.
- Bats: Right Throws: Right

Career highlights and awards
- College World Series champion (2025)

Daniel Cooper Dickinson (born December 5, 2003) is an American professional baseball second baseman in the Milwaukee Brewers organization.

== Amateur career ==
Dickinson attended Kennewick High School in his hometown of Kennewick, Washington. He didn't make his high school's varsity baseball team until his junior year. Dickinson still hit .529 with seven home runs during his senior year, being 2x all-conference shortstop and Mid-Columbia Conference Player of the Year.

Dickinson went to Utah Valley University as a walk-on to play college baseball.

In his freshman year, he played in 54 games and was All-WAC First Team selection, hitting .376 and breaking many program records in the process. His second season with Utah Valley was not different. He was a first-team All-WAC selection in 2024, batting .363 with 14 doubles, 18 homers, 53 RBIs, and 32 stolen bases in 59 games. He ended the season as a Dick Howser Trophy Award semifinalist. He posted a .369 career batting average in two seasons at Utah Valley with 27 home runs, 95 RBI and a .457 on-base percentage. He was the first Utah Valley player ever to make the US collegiate national team.

In the 2025 season, Dickinson was ranked No. 2 in Baseball America’s Preseason Top 100 College Transfers for the 2025 season. With LSU, he batted .315 with 14 doubles, 12 home runs, 49 RBI and 67 runs. During LSU's ultimate win in the College World Series, he hit .353 while in the finals collecting three hits and scoring one run in the two games of the College World Series. In the final month leading up to the World Series, Dickinson played through a broken hamate bone on his left wrist.

== Professional career ==
Dickinson was selected with the 185th overall pick in the 2025 Major League Baseball draft by the Milwaukee Brewers. He signed with the Brewers for an under-slot signing bonus of $325 thousand.
