= Ryan Mitchell (baseball) =

American baseball player (born 2007)

St. Louis Cardinals
- Outfielder
- Born: January 21, 2007 (age 19); Germantown, Tennessee, U.S.
- Bats: Left Throws: Right

Ryan Mitchell (born January 21, 2007) is an American professional baseball outfielder in the St. Louis Cardinals organization. He was drafted by the Cardinals in the second round of the 2025 MLB draft.

== Amateur career ==
Mitchell attended Houston High School in Germantown, Tennessee. As a senior in 2025, Mitchell led his high school in hitting .462 with an OBP of .615, and an OPS of 1.547, while driving in 55 runs, walking 49 times, and stealing 39 bases while hitting 12 home runs and 13 doubles. He won the Commercial Appeal's Baseball Player of the Year at the end of the season. Mitchell was considered a top prospect in the 2025 MLB draft. The day of the draft, Perfect Game Baseball ranked him the 24th best player in the country, while being the best player in his state of Tennessee. He committed to play college baseball at Georgia Tech.

== Professional career ==
Mitchell was drafted by the St. Louis Cardinals in the second round, with the 55th overall selection, in the 2025 Major League Baseball draft. He signed with the Cardinals on July 19, 2025, for a $2.25 million signing bonus.
