= Matt LaChappa =

American baseball player

San Diego Padres
- Pitcher
- Born: June 29, 1975 (age 51); San Diego, California, U.S.
- Bats: Left Throws: Left

MiLB debut
- 1993, for the Arizona League Padres

MiLB statistics
- Win–loss record: 18–19
- Earned run average: 4.80
- Strikeouts: 277
- WHIP: 1.489
- Stats at Baseball Reference

Teams
- Arizona League Padres (1993); Springfield Sultans (1994); Rancho Cucamonga Quakes (1995)

Matthew John "Matt" LaChappa (born June 29, 1975) is an American baseball pitcher who pitched in the San Diego Padres minor league system. LaChappa is known for being a "Padre for life", having signed a minor league contract with the team for nearly thirty years since suffering a heart attack during a Rancho Cucamonga Quakes game on April 6, 1996. LaChappa currently resides with his family at the Barona Indian Reservation.

== Baseball career ==
LaChappa was a second-round draft choice during the 1993 Major League Baseball draft from El Capitan High School. He began his minor league career with the Arizona League Padres in 1993, moving to Class A Springfield Sultans in 1994, and finally Class A-Advanced Rancho Cucamonga Quakes the following year. He won 11 games for the Quakes.

== "Padre for life" ==
In 1996, while warming up in the bullpen to enter what would have been the first game of his season as a relief pitcher, LaChappa collapsed and suffered a heart attack. The Quakes athletic trainer performed cardiopulmonary resuscitation on LaChappa for 20 minutes until he was taken to a local hospital. At the hospital, he suffered a second heart attack. LaChappa survived, but suffered brain damage from the lack of oxygen and has difficulty moving and speaking; he uses a wheelchair. Since the incident, the Padres organization has signed him yearly to a basic minor league contract so that he can maintain his health insurance. The Padres have also named a Little League field after him in Lakeside, California. The Matt LaChappa Athletic Scholarship Foundation was also established to assist high school students to pay for their college education.
