= Duque Hebbert =

Free agent
- Pitcher
- Born: October 29, 2001 (age 24); Puerto Cabezas, Nicaragua
- Bats: Right Throws: Right
- Stats at Baseball Reference

Duque Ossami Hebbert (born October 29, 2001) is a Nicaraguan professional baseball pitcher who is a free agent.

== Career ==
He represented the Nicaragua national baseball team in the 2023 World Baseball Classic. On March 13, 2023, Hebbert pitched one inning in Nicaragua's game against the Dominican Republic, striking out Juan Soto, Julio Rodríguez, and Rafael Devers. After the game, he agreed to sign with the Detroit Tigers.

He again represented Nicaragua at the 2026 World Baseball Classic.

He was released by the Tigers on August 1, 2026.
