= Minor League Baseball rosters =

Index of rosters of minor league baseball teams in North America

Listed below are each of the active sports leagues in Minor League Baseball, with linked articles containing rosters for each active team in the league.

As with nearly all North American professional team sports, there are limits to the roster sizes of minor-league teams, which vary by classification level. Major League Baseball-affiliated teams are limited in how many players they may place on their active rosters, except for some "rookie" leagues. At lower classification levels, there are restrictions on how much prior professional experience players on the roster may have.

While a team's active roster consists of players eligible to compete for the team in games, a team's reserve roster consists of players on the injured list, those who are restricted or suspended, or who are otherwise temporarily inactive. Major league players on rehabilitation assignments do not count against active roster limits.

As of the 2021 season, the following limits are used:

Level	Active roster size	Player restrictions
Triple-A	28 players	no restrictions
Double-A	28 players	no restrictions
High-A	30 players	No more than 2 players and 1 player-coach with 6 or more years of minor-league experience
Single-A	30 players	No more than 2 players with 5 or more years of minor-league experience
US-based; Rookie	no limit	No more than 3 players with 4 or more years of minor-league experience
International; Rookie	35 players	No players with 4 or more years of minor-league experience

== Triple-A ==
=== International League ===
- International League rosters

=== Pacific Coast League ===
- Pacific Coast League rosters

== Double-A ==
=== Eastern League ===
- Eastern League rosters

=== Southern League ===
- Southern League rosters

=== Texas League ===
- Texas League rosters

== High-A ==
=== Midwest League ===
- Midwest League rosters

=== Northwest League ===
- Northwest League rosters

=== South Atlantic League ===
- South Atlantic League rosters

== Single-A ==
=== California League ===
- California League rosters

=== Carolina League ===
- Carolina League rosters

=== Florida State League ===
- Florida State League rosters

== Rookie ==
=== Arizona Complex League ===
- Arizona Complex League rosters

=== Dominican Summer League ===
- Dominican Summer League rosters

=== Florida Complex League ===
- Florida Complex League rosters

== Offseason leagues ==
=== Arizona Fall League ===
- Arizona Fall League rosters

== See also ==
- Major League Baseball rosters
- Major League Baseball transactions
