= Kansas City Royals minor league players =

American baseball player (born 2003)

Below is a partial list of minor league baseball players in the Kansas City Royals system.

== Players ==
=== Angel Bastardo ===
Angel Bastardo

Kansas City Royals
- Pitcher
- Born: June 18, 2002 (age 24); Morón, Venezuela
- Bats: Right Throws: Right

Angel Jose Bastardo (born June 18, 2002) is a Venezuelan professional baseball pitcher for the Kansas City Royals of Major League Baseball (MLB).

On July 2, 2018, Bastardo signed with the Boston Red Sox as an international free agent when he was 16 years old for a $35,000 signing bonus. He made his professional debut in 2019 with the Dominican Summer League Red Sox. Bastardo did not play in a game in 2020 due to the cancellation of the minor league season because of the COVID-19 pandemic.

Bastardo returned to action in 2021 with the rookie-level Florida Complex League Red Sox. In 10 games (6 starts), he struggled to a 1–3 record and 6.67 ERA with 33 strikeouts across 29 2/3 innings pitched. Bastardo made 22 starts for the Single-A Salem Red Sox in 2022, logging a 3–4 record and 4.50 ERA with 85 strikeouts over 82 innings of work. He split the 2023 campaign between the Single-A Greenville Drive and Double-A Portland Sea Dogs. In 24 starts for the two affiliates, Bastardo compiled a 2–8 record and 4.68 ERA with 149 strikeouts across 119 1/3 innings pitched.

Bastardo made 10 starts for Double-A Portland in 2024, registering an 0–5 record and 5.36 ERA with 53 strikeouts across 45 1/3 innings pitched. On June 19, 2024, it was announced that Bastardo would require Tommy John surgery, ending his season.

On December 11, 2024, the Toronto Blue Jays selected Bastardo from the Red Sox in the Rule 5 draft. He missed the entirety of the 2025 season in recovery from surgery.

On March 25, 2026, Bastardo was designated for assignment by the Blue Jays after failing to make the team's Opening Day roster. On April 1, Bastardo was returned to the Red Sox organization. In 40 appearances for the Triple–A Worcester Red Sox, he logged a 6–1 record and 4.64 ERA with 73 strikeouts and three saves spanning 54 1/3 innings of relief. On October 29, Bastardo re-signed with Boston on a new minor league contract.

On November 17, 2026, Bastardo was traded to the Kansas City Royals in exchange for Jack Pineda; he was subsequently added to Kansas City's 40–man roster to prevent him from being selected in the Rule 5 draft.

- Career statistics from Baseball Reference (Minors)

=== Lucas Braun ===
Lucas Braun

Kansas City Royals
- Pitcher
- Born: August 26, 2001 (age 25); Santa Monica, California, U.S.
- Bats: Right Throws: Right

Lucas Braun (born August 26, 2001) is an American professional baseball pitcher in the Kansas City Royals organization.

Braun attended Palisades Charter High School in Los Angeles and played college baseball at the University of California, San Diego and California State University, Northridge. He was selected by the Atlanta Braves in the sixth round of the 2023 Major League Baseball draft.

Braun signed with the Braves for $347,500, and made his professional debut with the Augusta GreenJackets. In 2023, he pitched for Augusta and the Rome Braves. He began the 2024 season with Rome before being promoted to the Mississippi Braves.

On August 1, 2026, the Braves traded Braun to the Kansas City Royals, along with Carter Holton, in exchange for Lane Thomas and Bailey Falter.

- Career statistics from MLB · Fangraphs · Baseball Reference (Minors)
- San Diego Toreros bio
- Cal State Northridge Matadors bio

=== Kendry Chourio ===
Kendry Chourio

Kansas City Royals
- Pitcher
- Born: October 1, 2007 (age 19); Maracaibo, Venezuela
- Bats: Right Throws: Right

Kendry Manuel Chourio (born October 1, 2007) is a Venezuelan professional baseball pitcher in the Kansas City Royals organization.

Chourio signed with the Kansas City Royals as an international free agent in January 2025. He made his professional debut that year with the Dominican Summer League Royals.

After five games he was promoted to the Arizona Complex League Royals. After three games he was promoted again, this time to the Columbia Fireflies.

- Career statistics from Baseball Reference (Minors)

=== Dennis Colleran ===
Dennis Colleran

Kansas City Royals
- Pitcher
- Born: August 20, 2003 (age 23); North Attleborough, Massachusetts, U.S.
- Bats: Right Throws: Right

Dennis Patrick Colleran Jr. (born August 20, 2003) is an American baseball pitcher in the Kansas City Royals organization.

Colleran attended North Attleborough High School in North Attleborough, Massachusetts. He played college baseball at Northeastern University for the Huskies.

As a freshman for the Huskies in 2022, Colleran appeared in 15 games and pitched to a 0–1 record and 4.50 ERA with 24 strikeouts over 22 innings before undergoing Tommy John surgery, forcing him to miss the entirety of the 2023 season. He returned to the mound during the summer of 2023, and played collegiate summer baseball with both the Hyannis Harbor Hawks of the Cape Cod Baseball League and the Worcester Bravehearts of the Futures Collegiate Baseball League. In 2024, he appeared in twenty games for the Huskies and went 1–2 with a 7.97 ERA and 46 strikeouts over 40 2/3 innings. After the season, he participated in the MLB Draft Combine at Chase Field.

Colleran was selected by the Kansas City Royals in the seventh round of the 2024 Major League Baseball draft. He made his professional debut in 2025 with the Columbia Fireflies and was promoted to the Quad Cities River Bandits and Northwest Arkansas Naturals during the season. Over 44 relief appearances between the three teams, Colleran went 9–0 with a 2.85 ERA and 72 strikeouts over 66 1/3 innings. He was assigned to play in the Arizona Fall League with the Surprise Saguaros after the season. Colleran returned to Northwest Arkansas for the 2026 season and had a 3–1 record, a 7.52 ERA, 51 strikeouts and 48 walks over 52 2/3 innings.

- Career statistics from Baseball Reference (Minors)
- Northeastern Huskies bio

=== Angeibel Gómez ===
Angeibel Gómez

Kansas City Royals
- Outfielder
- Born: December 12, 2008 (age 17); Maracay, Venezuela
- Bats: Right Throws: Right

Angeibel Alejandro Gómez (born December 12, 2008) is a Venezuelan professional baseball outfielder in the Kansas City Royals organization.

Gómez was rated as one of the top prospects in the 2026 international class. He signed with the Kansas City Royals in January 2026 for $2.9 million.

Gómez made his professional debut in 2026 with the Dominican Summer League Royals.

- Career statistics from Baseball Reference (Minors)

=== Omar Hernández ===
Omar Hernández

Kansas City Royals
- Catcher
- Born: December 10, 2001 (age 24); Havana, Cuba
- Bats: Switch Throws: Right

Omar Hernández (born December 10, 2001) is a Cuban professional baseball catcher for the Kansas City Royals of Major League Baseball (MLB). Hernandez played for the Spain national baseball team for the 2023 World Baseball Classic qualifiers. He was named to the Cuba national baseball team for the 2026 World Baseball Classic.

Hernández moved to Spain when he was 12. Despite originally playing soccer, Hernández played baseball in Spain. At 16, he played for the CB Viladecans in Spain's División de Honor de Béisbol where he hit .434/.500/.528 with 25 runs in 26 games.

Hernández signed with the Kansas City Royals as an international free agent in August 2018. He was promoted to Double-A Northwest Arkansas Naturals mid-way through the 2025 season. In 41 games for Northwest Arkansas in 2025, Hernández slashed .243/.279/.552.

- Career statistics from Baseball Reference (Minors)

=== Ben Kudrna ===
Ben Kudrna

Kansas City Royals – No. 59
- Pitcher
- Born: January 30, 2003 (age 23); Shawnee Mission, Kansas, U.S.
- Bats: Right Throws: Right

Benjamin Michael Kudrna (born January 30, 2003) is an American professional baseball pitcher for the Kansas City Royals of Major League Baseball (MLB).

Kudrna grew up in Overland Park, Kansas and attended Blue Valley Southwest High School. As a senior, Kudrna was named the Gatorade Kansas Baseball Player of the Year and the Class 5A Pitcher of the Year after he went 9–1 on the mound with a 0.99 ERA and 100 strikeouts and 11 walks in 57 1/3 innings pitched. Kudrna committed to play college baseball at Louisiana State prior to signing with the Royals.

Kudrna was selected in the second round (43rd overall) of the 2021 MLB draft by the Kansas City Royals. He signed with the team on July 19, 2021, and received a $3 million signing bonus. Kudrna began the 2022 season in extended spring training before being assigned to the Columbia Fireflies of the Single-A Carolina League.

In 2025, Kudrna made 24 appearances (22 starts) for the Double-A Northwest Arkansas Naturals and Triple-A Omaha Storm Chasers, for whom he accumulated a 2–8 record and 5.30 ERA with 106 strikeouts across 105 1/3 innings pitched. On November 18, 2025, the Royals added Kudrna to their 40-man roster to protect him from the Rule 5 draft.

Kudrna was optioned to Triple-A Omaha to begin the 2026 season. He made one start for Omaha, allowing two earned runs with two strikeouts over two innings pitched. On April 29, 2026, it was announced that Kudrna had undergone surgery to repair an olecranon stress fracture.

- Career statistics from Baseball Reference (Minors)

=== Justin Lamkin ===
Justin Lamkin

Kansas City Royals
- Pitcher
- Born: June 1, 2004 (age 22); Corpus Christi, Texas, U.S.
- Bats: Right Throws: Left

Justin Neil Lamkin (born June 1, 2004) is an American baseball pitcher in the Kansas City Royals organization.

Lamkin attended Calallen High School in Corpus Christi, Texas and played college baseball at Texas A&M University for the Aggies. As a sophomore for Texas A&M in 2024, he had a 5.21 ERA across 19 games. As a junior in 2025, Lamkin had a 5–7 record and 3.42 ERA over 15 starts alongside 98 strikeouts across 84 1/3 innings.

Lamkin was selected by the Kansas City Royals with the 71st overall pick in the 2025 Major League Baseball draft. He signed with the team for $1.16 million.

Lamkin was a non-roster invitee to 2026 spring training and was named to Kansas City's Spring Breakout roster. He made his professional debut with High-A Quad Cities River Bandits. After six starts in which he had a 2–0 record, a 1.27 ERA, and 38 strikeouts over 28 1/3 innings, he was promoted to the Double-A Northwest Arkansas Naturals. Lamkin made two starts with the Naturals and pitched to a 3.97 ERA before he was placed on the 7-day injured list with a back strain. He was later transferred to the 60-day injured list, and did not make another appearance during the season. After the season, Lamkin was assigned to play in the Arizona Fall League with the Surprise Saguaros. He was named to the Fall Stars Game.

- Career statistics from Baseball Reference (Minors)
- Texas A&M Aggies bio

=== Michael Lombardi ===
Michael Lombardi

Kansas City Royals
- Pitcher
- Born: September 20, 2003 (age 23); Norwalk, Connecticut, U.S.
- Bats: Right Throws: Right

Michael Lawrence Lombardi (born September 20, 2003) is an American professional baseball pitcher in the Kansas City Royals organization.

Lombardi attended Fox Lane High School in Bedford, New York. He committed to Tulane to play college baseball.

As a freshman at Tulane in 2023, Lombardi played in 42 games and started 16. At the plate, he had a .152 batting average and slugging percentage with 10 runs scored, four RBI, and a .350 on-base percentage. After his freshman season, Lombardi played summer baseball for the Santa Barbara Foresters of the California Collegiate League. In his second season at Tulane in 2024, Lombardi played in 43 games, starting 41 of them. He hit .277 with 25 runs, seven doubles, two home runs, and 26 RBI, a .380 on-base percentage, and .369 slugging percentage. Lombardi additionally went 4–3 with a 3.89 ERA in 41 2/3 innings.

In his final season with Tulane as a closer in 2025, Lombardi hit .273 with 34 runs scored, 38 hits, nine doubles, two triples, four home runs, 29 RBI, 63 total bases, five stolen bases, and 22 walks with 17 strikeouts in 42 games (36 starts). As a pitcher, Lombardi had a career record of 8–6 with 16 saves and an 3.82 ERA in 113 innings with the Green Wave.

Lombardi was a top prospect for the 2025 MLB draft, and the Kansas City Royals selected him in the second round with the 61st overall pick. He signed with Kansas City on July 21 for $1,297,500. He did not pitch professionally in 2025.

- Career statistics from Baseball Reference (Minors)
- Tulane Bio

=== Hunter Owen ===
Hunter Owen

Kansas City Royals
- Pitcher
- Born: January 30, 2002 (age 24); Portland, Maine, U.S.
- Bats: Right Throws: Left

Hunter Scot Owen (born January 30, 2002) is an American baseball pitcher in the Kansas City Royals organization.

Owen attended South Portland High School in South Portland, Maine. In 2019, he was named the Maine Gatorade Baseball Player of the Year.

After graduating in 2020, Owen enrolled at Vanderbilt University to play college baseball for the Commodores. In 2021 and 2022, he played collegiate summer baseball with the Brewster Whitecaps of Cape Cod Baseball League. As a junior in 2023, he started 12 games and went 4–0 with a 3.52 ERA and 76 strikeouts over 64 innings while missing time due to fatigue and shoulder soreness. After the season, he participated in the 2023 MLB Draft combine. Owen was selected by the Kansas City Royals in the fourth round of the 2023 Major League Baseball draft. He signed with the team for $631,700.

Owen made his professional debut in 2024 with the Quad Cities River Bandits, starting 22 games and going 6–7 with a 4.24 ERA and eighty strikeouts over 102 innings. He was assigned to the Northwest Arkansas Naturals for the 2025 season. Over 22 games (19 starts), Owen went 5–5 with a 3.80 ERA and 107 strikeouts over 94 2/3 innings. He was assigned to play in the Arizona Fall League with the Surprise Saguaros after the season. Owen returned to Northwest Arkansas to begin the 2026 season and was promoted to the Omaha Storm Chasers in September. Across 26 games between both teams, he had a 3–7 record, a 5.97 ERA, and 113 strikeouts over 98 innings.

- Career statistics from Baseball Reference (Minors)
- Vanderbilt Commodores bio

=== Shane Panzini ===
Shane Panzini
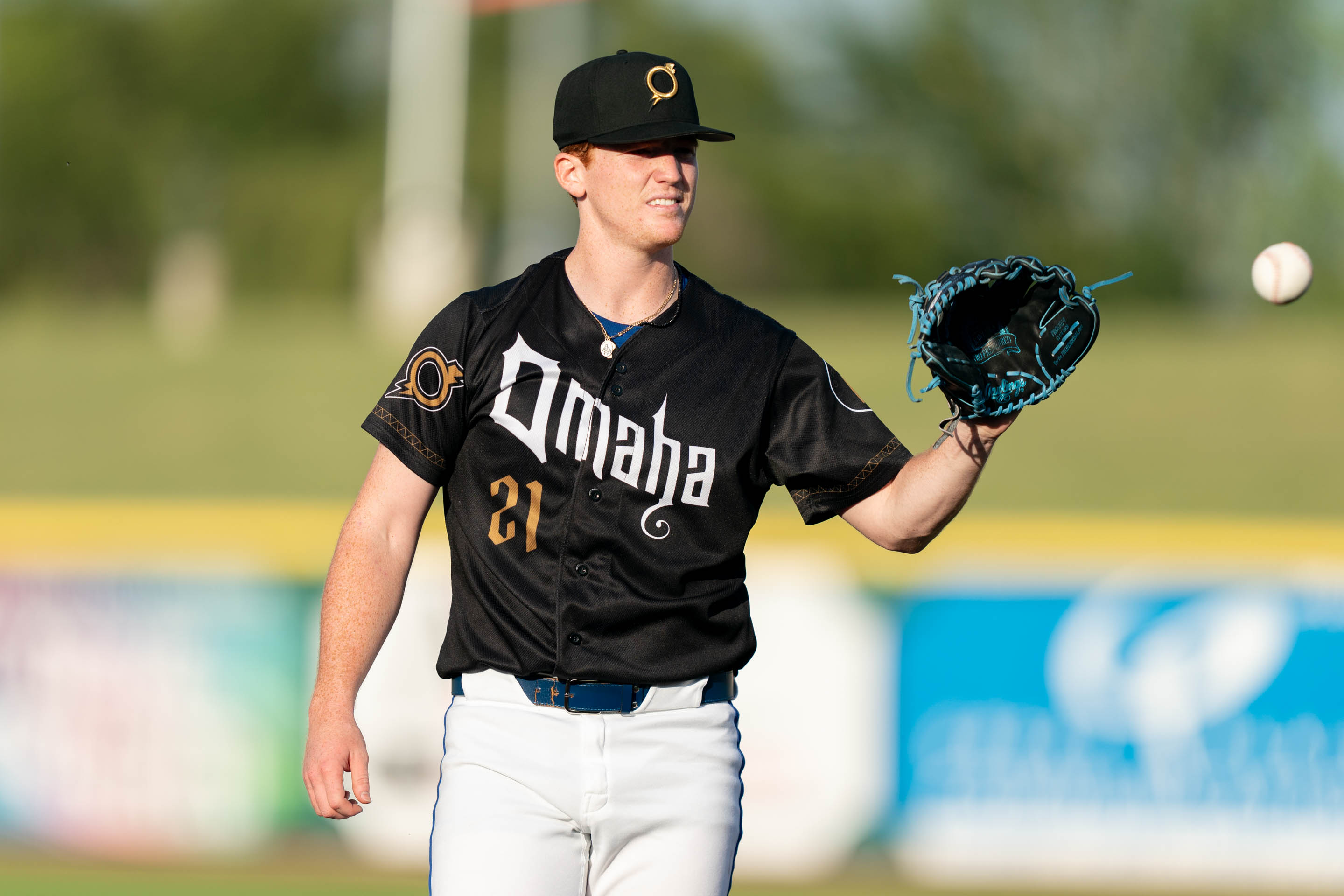
- Panzini with the Omaha Storm Chasers in 2025

Kansas City Royals
- Pitcher
- Born: October 30, 2001 (age 25); Spring Lake, New Jersey, U.S.
- Bats: Right Throws: Right

Shane Jude Panzini (born October 30, 2001) is an American professional baseball pitcher in the Kansas City Royals organization.

Panzini attended Red Bank Catholic High School in Red Bank, New Jersey. As a senior in 2021, he pitched to a 0.91 ERA and 115 strikeouts. Panzini was selected by the Kansas City Royals in the fourth round of the 2021 Major League Baseball draft. He signed with the team for $1 million, forgoing his commitment to play college baseball at the University of Virginia.

After signing, Panzini spent time at Kansas City's facility in Arizona training and participating in instructional league games. He made his professional debut in 2022 with the Columbia Fireflies, starting 17 games and going 0–4 with a 5.00 ERA across 63 innings pitched. In 2023, he returned to play with Columbia and also pitched in two games with the Quad Cities River Bandits. Over 22 starts between both clubs, Panzini went 3–11 with a 5.29 ERA and 105 strikeouts over 97 innings. Panzini returned to Quad Cities for the 2024 season and appeared in 16 games (seven starts), going 3–3 with a 5.29 ERA across 51 innings. After the season, he played in the Arizona Fall League with the Surprise Saguaros. In 2025, Panzini made 26 appearances (17 starts) between Quad Cities, the Northwest Arkansas Naturals, and the Omaha Storm Chasers, pitching to an 8–3 record, a 3.39 ERA and 114 strikeouts over 109 innings. Panzini returned to Omaha to begin the 2026 season and also played with Northwest Arkansas while missing time in May, June, July and August due to injury. Across 20 games between both teams, he had a 2–4 record, a 9.99 ERA, 34 strikeouts, and 30 walks over 33 1/3 innings.

- Career statistics from Baseball Reference (Minors)

=== Ramón Ramírez ===
Ramón Ramírez

Kansas City Royals
- Catcher
- Born: June 15, 2005 (age 21); Porlamar, Venezuela
- Bats: Right Throws: Right

Ramón Israel Ramírez (born June 15, 2005) is a Venezuelan professional baseball catcher in the Kansas City Royals organization.

Ramírez signed with the Kansas City Royals as an international free agent in January 2023. He made his professional debut that year with the Dominican Summer League Royals.

Ramírez played 2024 with the Arizona Complex League Royals and started the 2025 season with them before being promoted to the Columbia Fireflies. He started 2026 with the Quad Cities River Bandits.

- Career statistics from Baseball Reference (Minors)

=== David Shields ===
David Shields

Kansas City Royals
- Pitcher
- Born: September 9, 2006 (age 20); Pittsburgh, Pennsylvania, U.S.
- Bats: Switch Throws: Left

David John Shields (born September 9, 2006) is an American professional baseball pitcher in the Kansas City Royals organization.

Shields attended Mt. Lebanon High School in Mt. Lebanon, Pennsylvania, where he played on the school's baseball team as a pitcher and football team as a quarterback. Originally set to graduate in 2025, he reclassified to the class of 2024. In 2024, he went 5–1 with a 0.51 ERA and 63 strikeouts over 35 innings and was named the Gatorade Pennsylvania Baseball Player of the Year. For his high school career, he compiled an 11–3 record, a 1.26 ERA, and 211 strikeouts. Shields was selected by the Kansas City Royals in the second round with the 41st overall pick of the 2024 Major League Baseball draft. He signed with the team for $2.3 million, forgoing his commitment to play college baseball at the University of Miami.

Shields was assigned to Kansas City's Spring Breakout roster during 2025 spring training. He made his professional debut that year with the Arizona Complex League Royals. After one start, he was promoted to the Columbia Fireflies. Shields made 18 starts for the Firelies and went 3–1 with a 2.01 ERA and 81 strikeouts over 71 2/3 innings and was named the Carolina League Pitcher of the Year.

Shields was assigned to the Quad Cities River Bandits for the 2026 season. He made 25 starts and had an 11–6 record, a 4.01 ERA, and 139 strikeouts over 116 2/3 innings.

- Career statistics from Baseball Reference (Minors)

=== Jack Slightom ===
Jack Slightom

Kansas City Royals
- Pitcher
- Born: April 3, 2008 (age 18); Hinsdale, Illinois, U.S.
- Bats: Right Throws: Right

Jack Matthew Slightom (born September 9, 2006) is an American professional baseball pitcher in the Kansas City Royals organization.

Slightom attended Lyons Township High School where he became the ace pitcher of the school. In his senior year, Slightom recorded a 0.73 ERA and 73 strikeouts in 37 innings and a 7–0 record. He is also known to throw fastballs around 90 miles per hour. At the end of the season, Slightom was the winner for the Charles "Chuck" Bennett Award. He committed to play college baseball at the University of Cincinnati.

Slightom was taken 56th overall in the 2026 Major League Baseball draft by the Kansas City Royals and later signed a $2.9 million signing bonus with the team.

- Career statistics from Baseball Reference (Minors)

=== Luca Tresh ===
Luca Tresh

Kansas City Royals
- Catcher
- Born: January 11, 2000 (age 26); Clearwater, Florida, U.S.
- Bats: Right Throws: Right

Luca Tresh (born January 11, 2000) is an American professional baseball catcher in the Kansas City Royals organization.

Tresh attended Clearwater Central Catholic High School in Clearwater, Florida and played college baseball at NC State University. He was drafted by the Kansas City Royals in the 17th round of the 2021 Major League Baseball draft.

Tresh played his first professional season in 2021 with the Arizona Complex League Royals and Columbia Fireflies. After the season, he played in the Arizona Fall League. He started 2022 with the Quad Cities River Bandits before his promotion to the Northwest Arkansas Naturals.

- Career statistics from Baseball Reference (Minors)

=== Javier Vaz ===
Javier Vaz
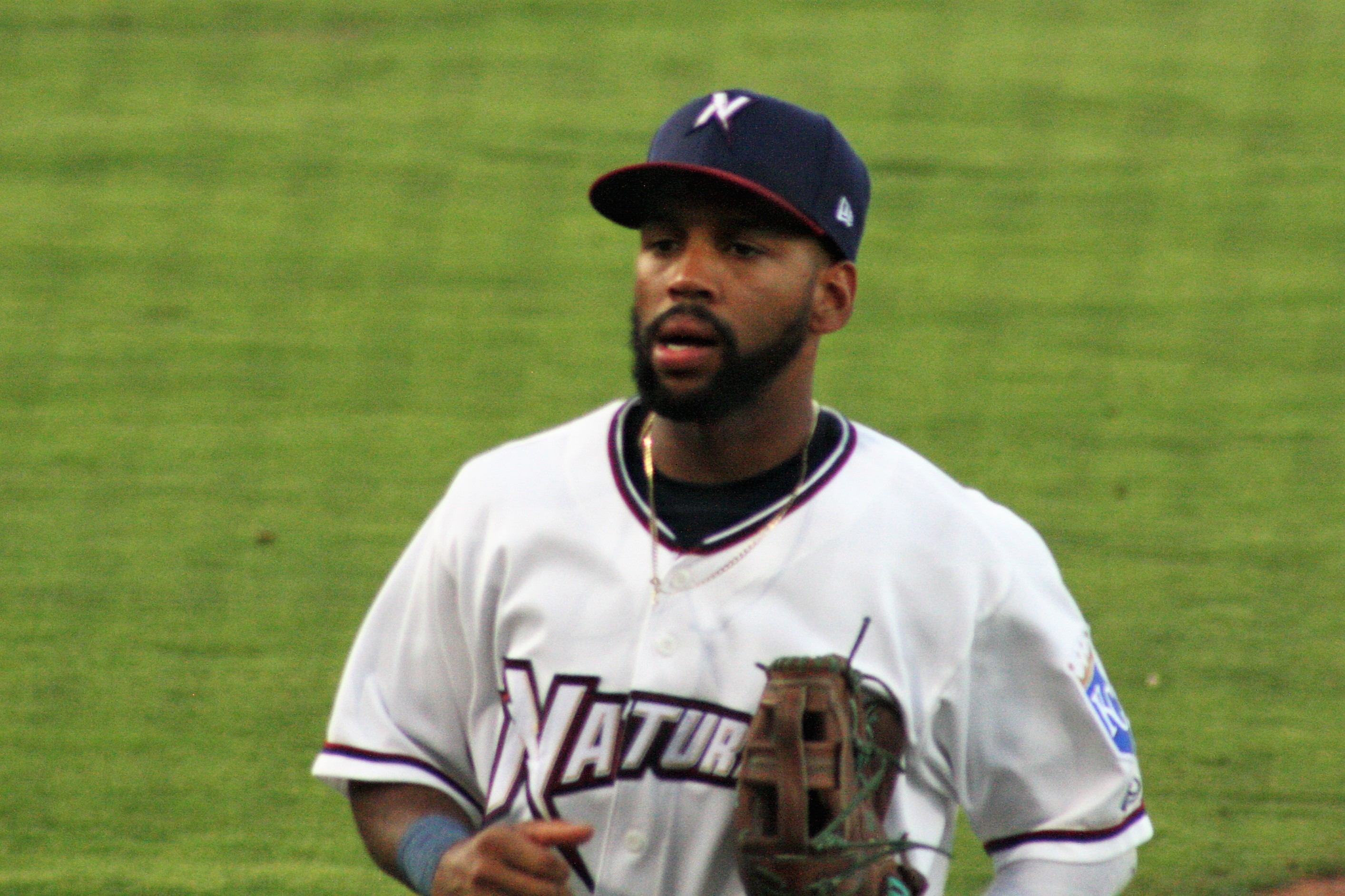

Kansas City Royals
- Outfielder / Second baseman
- Born: September 22, 2000 (age 26); Huntsville, Alabama, U.S.
- Bats: Left Throws: Right

Javier Rafael Vaz (born September 22, 2000) is an American professional baseball outfielder and second baseman in the Kansas City Royals organization.

Vaz attended Huntsville High School in Huntsville, Alabama and played college baseball at Louisiana State University at Eunice before transferring to Vanderbilt University. In 2022, he played collegiate summer baseball with the Brewster Whitecaps of the Cape Cod Baseball League. Vaz was drafted by the Kansas City Royals in the 15th round of the 2022 Major League Baseball draft.

Vaz spent his first professional season with the Arizona Complex League Royals and Columbia Fireflies. He started 2023 with the Quad Cities River Bandits before his promotion to the Northwest Arkansas Naturals.

- Career statistics from Baseball Reference (Minors)

=== Henry Williams ===
Henry Williams

Kansas City Royals
- Pitcher
- Born: September 18, 2001 (age 25); Darien, Connecticut, U.S.
- Bats: Right Throws: Right

Henry Alexander Williams (born September 18, 2001) is an American baseball pitcher in the Kansas City Royals organization.

Williams grew up in Darien, Connecticut and attended Darien High School, where he played baseball and basketball.

Williams played college baseball for the Duke Blue Devils. As a sophomore he went 3–3 with a 3.65 ERA 45 strikeouts over 37 innings pitched before suffering a torn ulnar collateral ligament in his pitching elbow. Williams underwent Tommy John surgery and missed both the rest of the season and all of his junior season.

Williams was selected in the third round of the 2022 Major League Baseball draft by the San Diego Padres. He signed with the team on July 27, 2022, for an over-slot signing bonus of $800,000. Williams was assigned to the Single-A Lake Elsinore Storm in May 2023 to begin his professional career.

Williams was traded along with Jesus Rios to the Kansas City Royals in exchange for Scott Barlow on August 2, 2023. The Royals assigned him to the Columbia Fireflies of the Single-A Carolina League.

- Career statistics from Baseball Reference (Minors)
- Duke Blue Devils bio

=== Peyton Wilson ===
Peyton Wilson
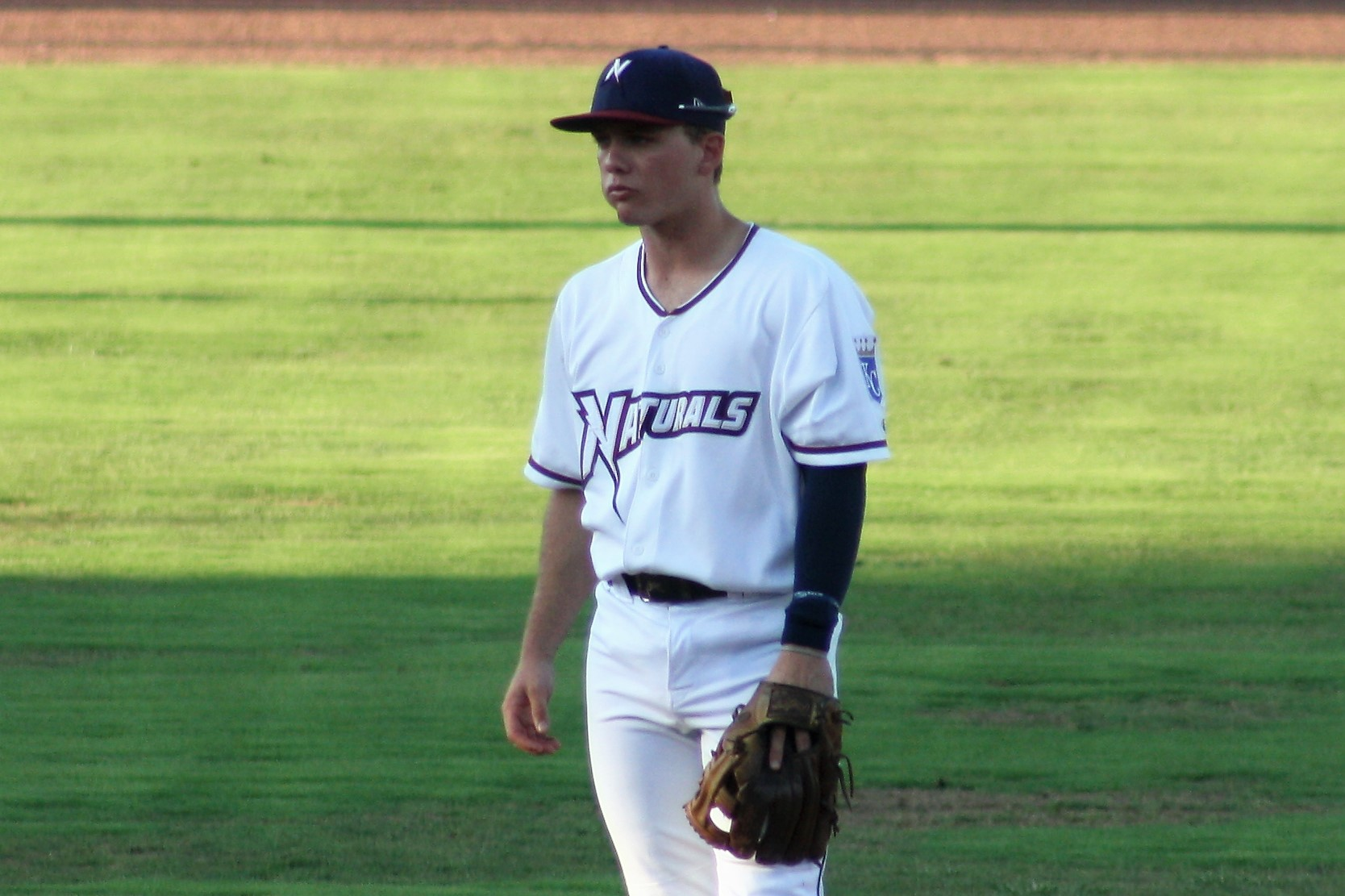

Kansas City Royals
- Second baseman
- Born: November 1, 1999 (age 27); Hoover, Alabama, U.S.
- Bats: Switch Throws: Right

Peyton Thomas Wilson (born November 1, 1999) is an American baseball second baseman in the Kansas City Royals organization. He played college baseball for the Alabama Crimson Tide.

Wilson grew up in Hoover, Alabama and attended Hoover High School. He committed to play college baseball at Alabama after his sophomore year. Wilson also played football at Hoover until giving up the sport as a junior to focus on baseball.

Wilson played both catcher and center field as a true freshman for the Alabama Crimson Tide and batted .333 over ten games before the season was cut short due to the COVID-19 pandemic. He moved to second base as a sophomore and was named second team All-Southeastern Conference after batting .290 while leading the Crimson Tide with 72 hits and 46 runs scored while also hitting 13 doubles, a triple and nine home runs with 31 RBIs.

Wilson was selected in the second round with the 66th overall pick in the 2021 Major League Baseball draft by the Kansas City Royals. He signed with the team on July 24, 2021, and received a $1,003,300 signing bonus. Wilson began his professional career with the Arizona Complex League Royals before being promoted to the Columbia Fireflies. Wilson began the 2022 season on the injured list before being assigned to the High-A Quad Cities River Bandits.

Wilson's older brother, John Parker Wilson, played quarterback for Alabama and in the National Football League. Another brother, Ross, played baseball at Alabama and in the Chicago White Sox, Miami Marlins, and Atlanta Braves organizations.

- Career statistics from Baseball Reference (Minors)
- Alabama Crimson Tide bio

=== Blake Wolters ===
Blake Wolters

Kansas City Royals
- Pitcher
- Born: October 25, 2004 (age 22); Urbana, Illinois, U.S.
- Bats: Right Throws: Right

Blake Wolters (born October 25, 2004) is an American professional baseball pitcher in the Kansas City Royals organization.

Wolters attended Mahomet-Seymour High School in Mahomet, Illinois, where he played baseball as well as basketball up until his senior year. As a senior in 2023, he had a 7–1 record, a 0.43 ERA, and 106 strikeouts and was named the Gatorade Illinois Baseball Player of the Year. Wolters was selected by the Kansas City Royals in the second round of the 2023 Major League Baseball draft. He signed for $2.8 million, forgoing his commitment to play college baseball at the University of Arizona.

Wolters made his professional debut in 2024 with the Single-A Columbia Fireflies and made 14 starts in which he had a 2–3 record and a 4.20 ERA across 55 2/3 innings. He returned to Columbia for the 2025 season, but missed two months due to injury; in total, he made 12 starts and went 2–2 with a 3.99 ERA and 40 strikeouts over 47 1/3 innings. Wolters returned to Columbia to open the 2026 season and was promoted to the High-A Quad Cities River Bandits in May. Across 25 games (24 starts) between the two teams, he went 5–9 with a 7.08 ERA and 114 strikeouts over 103 innings.

- Career statistics from Baseball Reference (Minors)

=== Steven Zobac ===
Steven Zobac

Kansas City Royals – No. 63
- Pitcher
- Born: October 14, 2000 (age 26); San Jose, California, U.S.
- Bats: Left Throws: Right

Steven Reed Zobac (born October 14, 2000) is an American professional baseball pitcher for the Kansas City Royals of Major League Baseball (MLB).

Zobac attended Valley Christian High School in San Jose, California and played college baseball at the University of California, Berkeley, where he was a pitcher and outfielder.

The Kansas City Royals selected Zobac in the fourth round of the 2022 Major League Baseball draft. He spent his first professional season in 2023 with the Columbia Fireflies and Quad Cities River Bandits. He started 2024 with Quad Cities and was promoted to the Double-A Northwest Arkansas Naturals during the season. The Royals named him their Paul Splittorff Pitcher of the Year.

Zobac made 11 starts for Northwest Arkansas in 2025, but struggled to an 0–3 record and 7.68 ERA with 37 strikeouts across 36 1/3 innings pitched. On November 18, 2025, the Royals added Zobac to their 40-man roster to protect him from the Rule 5 draft.

Zobac was optioned to Double-A Northwest Arkansas to begin the 2026 season.

- Career statistics from MLB · Baseball Reference (Minors)

== Full Triple-A to Rookie League rosters ==
=== Triple-A (Omaha) ===
Omaha Storm Chasers roster
Players		Coaches/Other
Pitchers: 34 Spencer Bivens *; -- Mason Black; -- Ethan Bosacker; 28 Lucas Braun; -- Hobie Harris; -- Chazz Martinez; 47 John Means; 56 Hunter Owen; 36 Hunter Patteson; 53 Ryan Ramsey; 52 Ben Sears; 59 Henry Williams	Catchers: 18 Omar Hernández; 11 Luca Tresh; Infielders: 35 Colton Becker; 16 Jacob Berry; 30 Connor Kaiser; 3 Jack Pineda; 22 Brett Squires; 1 Peyton Wilson; Outfielders: 9 Gavin Cross; 6 Carson Roccaforte; 2 Javier Vaz	Manager: 13 Patrick Osborn; Coaches: -- Dane Johnson (pitching); 7 Tripp Keister (assistant); -- David Lundquist (assistant pitching); 14 Bijan Rademacher (hitting); 7-day injured list; * On Kansas City Royals 40-man roster; ~ Development list; # Rehab assignment; ∞ Reserve list; ‡ Restricted list; § Suspended list; † Temporarily inactive list; Roster updated November 7, 2026; Transactions; → More rosters: MiLB • International League; → Kansas City Royals minor league players

=== Double-A (Northwest Arkansas) ===
Northwest Arkansas Naturals roster
Players		Coaches/Other
Pitchers: 32 Felix Arronde; 11 Drew Beam; 23 Zachary Cawyer; 29 Christian Chamberlain; 40 Dennis Colleran; 26 Tyson Guerrero; 46 Chase Jessee; 61 Brandon Johnson; 25 Justin Lamkin; 57 Augusto Mendieta; 51 Tommy Molsky; 31 Caden Monke; 47 Andrew Morones; 17 Frank Mozzicato; 41 Shane Panzini; 12 Coleman Picard; 49 Oscar Rayo; 44 Anthony Simonelli	Catchers: 7 Angel Acosta; 27 Canyon Brown; 18 Ricson Gonzalez; 47 Hyungchan Um; Infielders: 3 Justin Johnson; 8 Sam Kulasingam; 2 Connor Rasmussen; 9 Daniel Vazquez; Outfielders: 13 Spencer Nivens; 6 Luke Pelzer	Manager: 22 Brooks Conrad; Coaches: 34 Larry Carter (pitching); 52 Chris Corbett (assistant hitting & coach); 15 Andy LaRoche (hitting); 43 Anthony Silkwood (assistant pitching); 7-day injured list; * On Kansas City Royals 40-man roster; ~ Development list; # Rehab assignment; ∞ Reserve list; ‡ Restricted list; § Suspended list; † Temporarily inactive list; Roster updated November 2, 2026; Transactions; → More rosters: MiLB • Texas League; → Kansas City Royals minor league players

=== High-A (Quad Cities) ===
Quad Cities River Bandits roster
Players		Coaches/Other
Pitchers: 34 Ricson Gonzalez; 56 Kendry Chourio; 51 Jackson Cleveland; 49 Nick Conte; -- Bryson Dudley; 52 Kamden Edge; 19 Josh Hansell; 30 Rob Hensey; 27 Aiden Jimenez; 17 Tanner Jones; 57 L.P. Langevin; 15 Ethan McElvain; 22 Mason Miller; 23 Jesus Oliveira; 55 Yimi Presinal; 40 Emmanuel Reyes; 12 David Shields; 18 Blake Wolters; 33 Jordan Woods	Catchers: 3 Blake Mitchell; 6 Ramón Ramírez; 19 Stone Russell; Infielders: 16 Chris Brito; 41 Jose Cerice; 9 Austin Charles; 8 Derlin Figueroa; 29 Camden Johnson; 2 Tyriq Kemp; 32 Ben North; 28 Trevor Werner; Outfielders: -- Carter Frederick; 7 Asbel Gonzalez; 47 Henry Ramos; 25 Zion Rose; 1 Nolan Sailors; 4 Erick Torres	Manager: 24 Jesus Azuaje; Coaches: -- Emmanuel Burriss (hitting); 43 Derrick Lewis (pitching); 37 Luke Lowery (coach); -- Clayton Mortensen (assistant pitching); 60-day injured list: -- Sam Ruta (military leave); 7-day injured list; * On Kansas City Royals 40-man roster; ~ Development list; # Rehab assignment; ∞ Reserve list; ‡ Restricted list; § Suspended list; † Temporarily inactive list; Roster updated November 2, 2026; Transactions; → More rosters: MiLB • Midwest League; → Kansas City Royals minor league players

=== Single-A (Columbia) ===
Columbia Fireflies roster
Players		Coaches/Other
Pitchers: 13 Moises Amezquita; 37 Andy Basora; 21 Adrian Belen; 24 Michael Braswell III; 38 Grant Fontenot; 16 Jose Gutierrez; 27 Brandon Herbold; 35 Dalton Hill; 36 Carter Holton; 37 Justin LeGuernic; 22 Michael Lombardi; 23 Jesus Oliveira; 40 Yeri Perez; 28 Randy Ramnarace; 33 Jhon Reyes; 51 Darwin Rodriguez; 36 Alberto Toribio; 32 Shane Van Dam; 45 Hiro Wyatt	Catchers: 9 Brooks Bryan; 29 Gabriel Silva; 8 Jhosmmel Zue; Infielders: 1 Josh Hammond; 47 Tyson Moran; 11 Yandel Ricardo; 15 Ivan Sosa; 7 Jhonayker Ugarte; 4 JC Vanek; Outfielders: 0 Roni Cabrera; 3 Sean Gamble; 4 Daniel Lopez	Manager: 17 David Noworyta; Coaches: 18 Taylor Bloye (pitching); 27 Ramón Castro (hitting); 44 Chris Nelson (hitting); 51 Julio Pimentel (pitching); 7-day injured list; * On Kansas City Royals 40-man roster; ~ Development list; # Rehab assignment; ∞ Reserve list; ‡ Restricted list; § Suspended list; † Temporarily inactive list; Roster updated September 28, 2026; Transactions; → More rosters: MiLB • Carolina League; → Kansas City Royals minor league players

=== Rookie (Arizona) ===
Arizona Complex League Royals roster
Players		Coaches/Other
Pitchers: -- Dylan Alonso; -- Sthiven Benitez; 52 Grayson Boles; 44 Marwys Cabrera; 82 Keisther Castillo; -- Madden Clement; -- Cooper Corkrean; 35 Carlos De La Rosa; 32 Kyle DeGroat; 56 Diego Figueroa; 73 Julio Gutierrez; -- Lance Hartley; 63 Ryan McDonagh; -- Riley McDonald; 40 Cameron Millar; 76 Max Poirier; -- Hunter Possehl; -- Taylor Rabe; 48 David Rodriguez; 72 Oswal Rodriguez; -- Richie Roman; 70 Edinson Salgado; -- Jack Slightom; -- Gijs Van Den Brink; -- Dylan Vigue; -- Maxx Yehl	Catchers: 29 Jorge Hernandez; 1 Moises Marchán; 7 Jesus Morales; -- Banks Wickersham; Infielders: 4 Darison Garcia; 8 Manuel German; 6 Ramcell Medina; -- Jimmy Nati; 2 Omar Reyes; -- Pedro Roque; Outfielders: 17 Noah Barber; -- Dominic Battista; 16 Corey Cousin; 12 Lewis German; -- Tanner Griffith; 23 Sandy Luciano; 6 Raimel Medina; -- Angel Ramirez	Manager: 33 Larry Sutton; Coaches: -- Jesus Atencio (coach); -- Wilson Betemit (hitting); 60 Jesús Delgado (pitching); -- Rosell Herrera (assistant hitting); 62 Ken Knutson (rehab pitching); -- Christopher Marte (pitching); -- Alan Zinter (hitting); 7-day injured list; * On Kansas City Royals 40-man roster; ~ Development list; # Rehab assignment; ∞ Reserve list; ‡ Restricted list; § Suspended list; † Temporarily inactive list; Roster updated November 2, 2026; Transactions; → More rosters: MiLB • Arizona Complex League; → Kansas City Royals minor league players

=== Foreign Rookie (Dominican) ===
Dominican Summer League Royals Fortuna roster
Players		Coaches/Other
Pitchers: 73 Carlos Beras; 37 Samuel Carmona; 33 Oliver Del Rosario; 55 Luis Garces; 45 Jordin Jhonni; 59 Luis Lora; 61 Carlos Luces; 38 Delvin Medina; 52 Yolber Mendez; 57 Ricardo Montilla; 65 Cesar Mora; 47 Garvell Pinales; 48 Juan Rivera; 44 Melvin Robles; 50 Javier Rojas; 54 Danny Sanchez; 68 Andruw Solarte; 18 Neftali Taveras	Catchers: 82 Marcos Hernandez; 39 Richer Mata; 19 Jose Montilla; Infielders: 8 Leandro Briceno; 62 Angelmis De La Cruz; 63 Franniel De Los Santos; 74 Anderson Garcia; 23 Jesus Ortega; 7 Roy Rivero; 9 Jaider Suarez; 41 Renso Tenas; Outfielders: 28 Robinson Chacon; 4 Joshua Fermin; 29 Luis Ramon King; 37 Daury Martinez; -- Enmanuel Santos ‡	Manager: -- Ramon Martinez; Coaches: -- Irving Falu (bench); -- Jordan Norberto (pitching); -- Ariel Venegas (first base); -- Jose Veras (pitching); 7-day injured list; * On Kansas City Royals 40-man roster; ~ Development list; # Rehab assignment; ∞ Reserve list; ‡ Restricted list; § Suspended list; † Temporarily inactive list; Roster updated September 24, 2026; Transactions; → More rosters: MiLB • Dominican Summer League; → Kansas City Royals minor league players

Dominican Summer League Royals Ventura roster
Players		Coaches/Other
Pitchers: 78 Alejandro Beltran; -- Diony Brujan; 6 Alving Campusano; 67 Juan Cordero; 58 Argenis Done; 79 Angel Garcia; 66 Jesus Garcia; 75 Carlos Gonzalez; 56 Janiel Hernandez; 49 Jerlin Madera; 26 Frankeurys Marte; 35 Ernesto Mejia; 53 Kenyer Penaloza; 77 Reynell Ramos; 51 Hancer Regalado; 46 Olyver Rosas; 77 Adrian Rumardo; -- Andy Sanchez; 43 Rafi Santo; 76 Junior Suarez	Catchers: 31 Alberto Aguilar; 32 Anthony Longo; 16 Adrián Lunar; 25 Emmanuel Martinez; 2 Reynaldo Sanchez; Infielders: 72 Alan Angulo; 36 Juan Batista; 0 Warren Calcaño; 62 Angelmis De La Cruz; 11 Luis Gutierrez; 12 Luis Steven King; 13 Daniel Liriano; 3 Omar Mejia; 3 Rafi Santo; 1 Marwin Rivero; Outfielders: 24 Max De La Cruz; 15 Angeibel Gómez; 22 Alejandro Guerrero; 27 Maicoll Rondon	Manager: -- Sergio De Luna; Coaches: -- Onil Joseph (first base); -- Fernando Martinez (hitting); -- Leonel Santiago (pitching); -- Quilvio Veras (bench); 7-day injured list; * On Kansas City Royals 40-man roster; ~ Development list; # Rehab assignment; ∞ Reserve list; ‡ Restricted list; § Suspended list; † Temporarily inactive list; Roster updated November 2, 2026; Transactions; → More rosters: MiLB • Dominican Summer League; → Kansas City Royals minor league players
