= List of Carolina League team rosters =

Each of the 12 teams of Minor League Baseball's Carolina League carry a 30-man active roster. Only these players are eligible to play.

Teams may have any number of inactive players on their rosters at a given time who do not count toward active roster limits. Injured players may be placed on the injured list (7-day or 60-day). The temporary inactive list and bereavement list are for players attending to personal matters. Major league players may be placed on rosters for injury rehabilitation for a maximum of 20 days for non-pitchers and 30 days for pitchers.

Players who are ineligible to play due to failure to adhere to the Minor League Drug Prevention and Treatment Program, violations of their contract, who are receiving team disciplinary action, or who are unable to join the team due to visa problems may be placed on the restricted or suspended lists. These players count against a team's active roster limit.

Each team usually has a three-man coaching staff including a manager, hitting coach, and pitching coach. Depending on each Major League Baseball organization's development approach, some teams may have additional coaches.

== North Division ==
=== Delmarva Shorebirds ===
Delmarva Shorebirds roster
Players	Coaches/Other
Pitchers: 35 Luis Beltrán; 38 Denton Biller; 19 Deivy Cruz; 29 Adrián Delgado; 30 Sayer Diederich; 6 Carson Dorsey; 32 Brandon Downer; 45 Andy Fabian; 39 Javier González; -- Kailen Hamson; 37 Adrian Heredia; 31 Todd Kniebbe; 16 Kenny Leiner; 17 Kiefer Lord; 22 Esteban Mejía; -- Miguel Mesa; 18 Keeler Morfe; -- Trey Nordmann; -- Brayan Orrantia; 33 Twine Palmer; -- Alex Ramos; -- Christian Rodriguez; -- Juan Rojas; -- Isaac Silva; -- Braeden Sloan; Catchers: 27 Ike Irish; -- Adriander Mejía; 21 Andrés Nolaya; -- Juan Ortega; -- Miguel Rodríguez; 20 Andrew Tess; Infielders: 7 Luis Almeyda; 1 Wehiwa Aloy; -- Edwin Amparo; -- Félix Amparo; -- Junior Aybar; -- Maikol Hernández; 2 Cobb Hightower; -- DJ Layton; 26 Joshua Liranzo; 14 Brayden Smith; 23 Colin Yeaman; Outfielders: 3 RJ Austin; 4 Stiven Martinez; 9 Raylin Ramos; 28 Jordan Sanchez; 10 Braylin Tavera; -- Braylon Whitaker	Manager: -- Adonis Smith; Coaches: 36 Casey Buckley (development); -- Aritz Garcia (fundamentals); -- Collin McBride (hitting); -- Bailey Vuylsteke (pitching); 7-day injured list; * On Baltimore Orioles 40-man roster; ~ Development list; # Rehab assignment; ∞ Reserve list; ‡ Restricted list; § Suspended list; † Temporarily inactive list; Roster updated March 25, 2026; Transactions; → More rosters: MiLB • Carolina League; → Baltimore Orioles minor league players

=== Fayetteville Woodpeckers ===
Fayetteville Woodpeckers roster
Players	Coaches/Other
Pitchers: 11 Luis Aguilar; 48 Jhoster Baez; 1 Jesus Carrera; 15 Francisco Frias; 18 Rafael Gonzalez; 45 Cole Hertzler; 23 Eurys Martich; -- Ryan Mathiesen; -- Sandy Mejia; -- Juan Nunez; 16 Joan Ogando; 36 Raimy Rodriguez; 43 Leomar Rosario; 47 Parker Smith; -- Danny Trehey; 17 Ryan Verdugo; Catchers: 14 Carlos Cauro; 99 Arturo Flores; 4 Yosweld Vasquez; Infielders: 26 Zach Daudet; -- Camilo Diaz; 9 Brandon Forrester; 13 Curtis Hebert; 10 Alberto Hernandez; 13 Waner Luciano; 6 Nick Monistere; 0 German Ramirez; 8 Kyle Walker; Outfielders: 44 Chase Call; 30 Ethan Frey; 23 Cesar Hernandez; 14 Anthony Huezo; 99 Nehomar Ochua Jr.; 35 Justin Thomas	Manager: 18 Carlos Lugo; Coaches: -- Steve Serratore (hitting); 12 James Wiseman (pitching); 60-day injured list: 26 Grant Burleson; -- Julio Marte; 7-day injured list; * On Houston Astros 40-man roster; ~ Development list; # Rehab assignment; ∞ Reserve list; ‡ Restricted list; § Suspended list; † Temporarily inactive list; Roster updated March 23, 2026; Transactions; → More rosters: MiLB • Carolina League; → Houston Astros minor league players

=== Fredericksburg Nationals ===
Fredericksburg Nationals roster
Players	Coaches/Other
Pitchers: -- Juan Abreu; 17 Merrick Baldo; 26 Merritt Beeker; 28 Tucker Biven; -- Gavin Bruni; 35 Victor Farias; 41 Carson Fischer; 21 Luke Johnson; 32 Andy Luis; -- Isaac Lyon; 39 Riley Maddox; 27 Ryan Minckler; 34 Ben Moore; 11 Bryant Olson; 24 Bryan Polanco; 37 Owen Puk; 23 R.J. Sales; -- Camilo Sanchez; 36 Liam Sullivan; Catchers: 4 Kevin Bazzell; 7 Christian Fagnant; 12 Nick Hollifield; Infielders: 5 Everett Cooper III; 20 Randal Diaz; 10 Luke Dickerson; 15 Angel Feliz; -- Gavin Fien; -- Devin Fitz-Gerald; 29 Jorgelys Mota; 2 Rafael Ramirez Jr.; 38 Jacob Walsh; 13 Eli Willits; Outfielders: -- Yeremy Cabrera; 1 Brenner Cox; 19 Elijah Green; 25 Nick Peoples; 31 Ethan Petry; 22 Cristhian Vaquero	Manager: -- Chris O'Neill; Coaches: -- Luke Dziados (pitching); -- Isaac Kim (coach); -- Anthony Ray (defensive); -- Jake Scheiner (hitting); -- Luis Villanueva (assistant pitching); 60-day injured list: 14 Brayan Romero; 7-day injured list; * On Washington Nationals 40-man roster; ~ Development list; # Rehab assignment; ∞ Reserve list; ‡ Restricted list; § Suspended list; † Temporarily inactive list; Roster updated March 17, 2026; Transactions; → More rosters: MiLB • Carolina League; → Washington Nationals minor league players

=== Lynchburg Hillcats ===
Hill City Howlers roster
Players	Coaches/Other
Pitchers: 40 Eudry Alcantara; 30 Jervis Alfaro; -- Jake Berry; 27 Braylon Doughty; 38 Luke Fernandez; 43 Sean Heppner; -- Evelio Hernandez; 44 Melkis Hernandez; -- Aidan Major; 22 Will McCausland; 29 Logan McGuire; 49 Chase Mobley; 23 Joey Oakie; 47 Angel Perez; 41 Zane Petty; 27 Ryan Prager; 45 Raudy Rivera; 32 Cam Schuelke; -- Kendeglys Virguez; 33 Cam Walty; 46 Julio Zapata; 31 Jacob Zibin; 25 Keegan Zinn; 36 Donovan Zsak; Catchers: 34 Logun Clark; 8 Tyler Howard; 7 Cannon Peebles; Infielders: 15 Dean Curley; 1 Dauri Fernandez; 1 Welbyn Francisca; 5 Luke Hill; 48 Anthony Martinez; 11 Luis Merejo; 17 Yaikel Mijares; 6 Riley Nelson; 4 Anthony Silva; Outfielders: 2 Juneiker Caceres; 13 Yerlin Luis; 12 José Pirela; 16 Nolan Schubart; 9 Aaron Walton	Manager: 10 Erlin Cerda; Coaches: -- Chase Barbary (bench); -- Kevin Erminio (pitching); -- Il Hur (hitting); -- Amanda Kamekona (hitting); 7-day injured list; * On Cleveland Guardians 40-man roster; ~ Development list; # Rehab assignment; ∞ Reserve list; ‡ Restricted list; § Suspended list; † Temporarily inactive list; Roster updated March 27, 2026; Transactions; → More rosters: MiLB • Carolina League; → Cleveland Guardians minor league players

=== Salem RidgeYaks ===
Salem RidgeYaks roster
Players	Coaches/Other
Pitchers: 8 Adam Bates; 21 Jose Bello; 34 Calvin Bickerstaff; 29 Alex Bouchard; 27 Steven Brooks; 31 Nicolas De La Cruz; 6 Patrick Galle; 4 Joey Gartrell; 24 Ben Hansen; 18 Griffin Kilander; -- Brandon Neely; 33 Wuilliams Rodriguez; -- Cole Tolbert; Catchers: -- Adonys Guzman; -- Ronny Henderson; 15 Frederik Jimenez; 48 Andruw Musett; 20 Gerardo Rodriguez; 2 Kleyver Salazar; Infielders: 13 Yoeilin Cespedes; 27 Anderson Fermin; 38 Starlyn Nunez; 41 D'Angelo Ortiz; 12 Jack Winnay; Outfielders: 25 Enddy Azocar; -- Isaiah Jackson; 17 Skylar King; -- Stanley Tucker; 22 Natanael Yuten	Manager: 9 Ozzie Chavez; Coaches: 37 Brendan Argomaniz (assistant pitching); 35 Nelson Paulino (hitting coach); -- Ivan Quackenburg (assistant hitting); 36 Alex Reynolds (pitching); 26 Kyle Schmidt (coach); 60-day injured list: -- Matt Duffy; 28 Nicholas Judice; 34 Trennor O'Donnell; 7-day injured list; * On Boston Red Sox 40-man roster; ~ Development list; # Rehab assignment; ∞ Reserve list; ‡ Restricted list; § Suspended list; † Temporarily inactive list; Roster updated March 25, 2026; Transactions; → More rosters: MiLB • Carolina League; → Boston Red Sox minor league players

=== Wilson Warbirds ===
Wilson Warbirds roster
Players	Coaches/Other
Pitchers: 49 Carlos Carra; -- Enniel Cortez; 29 Ethan Dorchies; 32 Jayden Dubanewicz; 34 Jesús Flores; 18 Michael Fowler; -- Yorman Galindez; 48 Melvin Hernandez; 46 Garrett Hodges; -- Jack Hostetler; 17 Bjorn Johnson; -- Josh Knoth; 11 Bryce Meccage; 25 Enderson Mercado; 26 Miqueas Mercedes; -- Caleb Nieman; 39 Jose Nova; -- Eric Prado; 24 Joshua Quezada; 34 Tyler Renz; 44 Anfernny Reyes; 37 Bryan Rivera; 20 Wande Torres; 19 Chandler Welch; -- Jason Woodward; Catchers: 36 Kevin Garcia; 3 Edgardo Ordonez; 38 Yannic Walther; Infielders: 10 Eric Bitonti; 4 Filippo Di Turi; 12 Brady Ebel; 23 Luis Lameda; -- Quinton Low; 6 Juan Ortuno; 28 Tyler Rodriguez; Outfielders: 3 José Anderson; 13 Handelfry Encarnacion; 9 Braylon Payne; 22 Josiah Ragsdale	Manager: -- Eddy Morgan; Coaches: -- Ricky Carvajal; -- José García (hitting); -- Jesús Hernández (pitching); 27 Paul Moeller (pitching); 60-day injured list: -- Josh Timmerman; 49 Griffin Tobias; 7-day injured list; * On Milwaukee Brewers 40-man roster; ~ Development list; # Rehab assignment; ∞ Reserve list; ‡ Restricted list; § Suspended list; † Temporarily inactive list; Roster updated March 17, 2026; Transactions; → More rosters: MiLB • Carolina League; → Milwaukee Brewers minor league players

== South Division ==
=== Augusta GreenJackets ===
Augusta GreenJackets roster
Players	Coaches/Other
Pitchers: 28 Rayven Antonio; 22 Ethan Bagwell; 32 Landon Beidelschies; 59 Cam Caminiti; 33 Drew Christo; 70 Jackson Dannelley; 57 Logan Forsythe; 20 Owen Hackman; -- Carter Holton; 58 Carter Lovasz; 50 Jaylen Paden; -- Davis Polo; 34 Jeremy Reyes; 16 Kendy Richard; 14 Jacob Shafer; 2 Lewis Sifontes; 54 Kade Woods; Catchers: 18 Colin Burgess; 11 Nick Montgomery; Infielders: 36 Juan Mateo; 26 Joe Olsavsky; 4 Tate Southisene; 9 Dixon Williams; Outfielders: 24 Owen Carey; 46 John Estevez; 15 Hayden Friese; 49 Douglas Glod; 1 Luis Guanipa; 17 Eric Hartman; 46 Dallas Macias	Manager: -- Brad Stoll; Coaches: -- Rob Leary (coach); 27 Elvin Nina (pitching); -- Jefferson Romero (coach); -- Adam Wood (hitting); 60-day injured list: 55 Juan Sanchez; 7-day injured list; * On Atlanta Braves 40-man roster; ~ Development list; # Rehab assignment; ∞ Reserve list; ‡ Restricted list; § Suspended list; † Temporarily inactive list; Roster updated March 23, 2026; Transactions; → More rosters: MiLB • Carolina League; → Atlanta Braves minor league players

=== Charleston RiverDogs ===
Charleston RiverDogs roster
Players	Coaches/Other
Pitchers: 15 Ryan Andrade; 2 Alexander Campos; 37 Kaleb Corbett; 34 Andres Galan; 38 Jacob Hartlaub; -- Danny Hilario; -- Brayden Jones; 32 Jacob Kmatz; 13 Dylan Lesko; 33 Mason Nichols; 28 Dominic Niman; 27 Trendon Parish; -- Jeremy Pilon; 21 Trey Pooser; 16 Andy Rodriguez; 17 Bryce Shaffer; -- Jayden Voelker; Catchers: 18 Caden Bodine; 38 Brody Donay; 11 Yirer Garcia; 71 J.D. Gonzalez; Infielders: 25 Felix Cotes; 8 Ricardo Gonzalez; -- Brady Marget; 9 Larry Martinez; -- Ryan McCoy; 1 Jose Monzon; 10 Jose Perez; Outfielders: 31 Derek Datil; -- Theo Gillen; 12 Brailer Guerrero; 2 Connor Hujsak; 5 Tom Poole; -- James Quinn-Irons; -- Brendan Summerhill; 43 Marshall Toole	Manager: -- Danny Mendick; Coaches: -- Héctor Giménez (coach); -- Tyler Higgins (pitching); 3 Francisco Leandro (bench); -- Paul Rozelle (hitting); 7-day injured list; * On Tampa Bay Rays 40-man roster; ~ Development list; # Rehab assignment; ∞ Reserve list; ‡ Restricted list; § Suspended list; † Temporarily inactive list; Roster updated March 27, 2026; Transactions; → More rosters: MiLB • Carolina League; → Tampa Bay Rays minor league players

=== Columbia Fireflies ===
Columbia Fireflies roster
Players	Coaches/Other
Pitchers: 36 Dash Albus; -- Mack Anglin; 21 Kendry Chourio; 32 Nick Conte; 37 Kyle DeGroat; 24 Bryson Dudley; 16 Kamden Edge; 31 Jose Gutierrez; -- Tanner Jones; 25 Henson Leal; 18 Augusto Mendieta; 33 Fraynel Nova; 40 Yeri Perez; 34 Yimi Presinal; 21 Darwin Rodriguez; 35 David Shields; 11 Yenfri Sosa; 37 Blake Wolters; 23 Jordan Woods; 41 Hiro Wyatt; Catchers: 9 Angel Acosta; 28 Ramon Ramirez; 7 Stone Russell; -- Gabriel Silva; 6 Hyungchan Um; Infielders: 0 Jose Cerice; 45 Tyriq Kemp; 3 Brennon McNair; 4 Josi Novas; 29 Connor Rasmussen; 8 Yandel Ricardo; 2 JC Vanek; Outfielders: 19 Asbel Gonzalez; 26 Luke Pelzer; 1 Henry Ramos; 12 Milo Rushford	Manager: 17 David Noworyta; Coaches: 51 Taylor Bloye (pitching); 27 Ramón Castro (hitting); -- Chris Nelson (hitting); 43 Julio Pimentel (pitching); 7-day injured list; * On Kansas City Royals 40-man roster; ~ Development list; # Rehab assignment; ∞ Reserve list; ‡ Restricted list; § Suspended list; † Temporarily inactive list; Roster updated March 27, 2026; Transactions; → More rosters: MiLB • Carolina League; → Kansas City Royals minor league players

=== Hickory Crawdads ===
Hickory Crawdads roster
Players	Coaches/Other
Pitchers: 39 Aidan Deakins; -- J'Briell Easley; 13 Jake Jekielek; 18 Jesus Lafalaise; 38 Frank Martinez; 40 Aneudis Mejia; 24 Jormy Nivar; 30 Kamdyn Perry; 28 Owen Proksch; 4 Maicol Reyes; 41 Geury Rodriguez; -- Josh Sanders; 16 Luke Savage; 31 Enrique Segura; 25 Evan Siary; 21 Michael Trausch; 36 Wily Villar; Catchers: 19 Jack Collins; 8 Josh Springer; 14 Juan Sulbaran; Infielders: 3 Yolfran Castillo; -- Daniel Flames; 1 Luis Marquez; 9 Esteban Mejia; 2 Josh Owens; Outfielders: -- Marco Argudin; 27 Pablo Guerrero; 32 Braylin Morel; 37 Hector Osorio; 23 Paulino Santana; 11 Marcos Torres; 44 Deward Tovar	Manager: -- Nick Janssen; Coaches: -- Elevys Gonzalez (development); -- Herbert Iser (development); -- Carlisle Koestler (pitching); -- Daniel Padilla (hitting); 60-day injured list: -- Alberto Mota; 17 William Privette; 7-day injured list; * On Texas Rangers 40-man roster; ~ Development list; # Rehab assignment; ∞ Reserve list; ‡ Restricted list; § Suspended list; † Temporarily inactive list; Roster updated March 18, 2026; Transactions; → More rosters: MiLB • Carolina League; → Texas Rangers minor league players

=== Kannapolis Cannon Ballers ===
Kannapolis Cannon Ballers roster
Players	Coaches/Other
Pitchers: 23 Marco Barrios; 14 Jake Curtis; 33 Pierce George; 18 Madison Jeffrey; 17 Seth Keener; 26 Mathias LaCombe; 31 Jesus Mendez; 22 Mason Moore; 39 Liam Paddack; -- Truman Pauley; 35 Jake Peppers; 13 Nick Pinto; 10 Gabriel Rodriguez; 25 Blake Shepardson; 27 Justin Sinibaldi; 14 Garrett Wright; 13 Fabian Ysalla; Catchers: 16 Rylan Galvan; -- Steven Lancia; 31 James Taussig; Infielders: 22 Anthony DePino; 1 Bryce Eblin; 2 Adrian Gil; 20 Arxy Hernandez; 1 Javier Mogollon; 9 Colby Shelton; Outfielders: 11 Leandro Alsinois; 4 Nathan Archer; 5 Ely Brown; 5 Nick McLain; 22 Abraham Nunez; 24 George Wolkow	Manager: -- Jayson Nix; Coaches: -- Rodain Delus (performance); -- Xavier Fernández (bench); -- Rob Hardy (pitching); 19 Charlie Romero (hitting); 60-day injured list: 12 Luis Reyes; 8 Casey Saucke; 7-day injured list; * On Chicago White Sox 40-man roster; ~ Development list; # Rehab assignment; ∞ Reserve list; ‡ Restricted list; § Suspended list; † Temporarily inactive list; Roster updated March 20, 2026; Transactions; → More rosters: MiLB • Carolina League; → Chicago White Sox minor league players

=== Myrtle Beach Pelicans ===
Myrtle Beach Pelicans roster
Players	Coaches/Other
Pitchers: 11 Ethan Bell; 3 David Bracho; 38 Kevin Camacho; 50 Pierce Coppola; 32 Noah Edders; 33 Ethan Flanagan; 7 Jostin Florentino; -- Hayden Frank; 34 Christian Gordon; 13 Ronny Lopez; -- Mason McGwire; 20 Edwardo Melendez; 35 Luis A. Reyes; 41 Alfredo Romero; 44 Joel Sierra; 55 Brayden Spears; -- JP Wheat; 16 Victor Zarraga; Catchers: -- Owen Ayers; 19 Michael Carico; 5 Jairo Diaz; 24 Dilan Granadillo; 51 Justin Stransky; Infielders: 8 Angel Cepeda; 9 Jose Escobar; 22 Matt Halbach; 17 Cole Mathis; 53 Yahil Melendez; -- Eriandys Ramon; 39 Ty Southisene; Outfielders: 40 Derik Alcantara; 52 Kane Kepley; 54 Eli Lovich; 25 Alexey Lumpuy	Manager: 15 Yovanny Cuevas; Coaches: -- Andrew Betcher (pitching); -- Luis Hernandez (pitching); 45 D'Angelo Jiménez (bench); 6 Kyle Sutherland (development); 28 Roberto Vaz (hitting); 60-day injured list: 27 Yoendris Gonzalez; 30 Thomas Mangus; 7-day injured list; * On Chicago Cubs 40-man roster; ~ Development list; # Rehab assignment; ∞ Reserve list; ‡ Restricted list; § Suspended list; † Temporarily inactive list; Roster updated March 26, 2026; Transactions; → More rosters: MiLB • Carolina League; → Chicago Cubs minor league players

== See also ==
- List of California League team rosters
- List of Florida State League team rosters
