= Carter Jensen =

American baseball player (born 2003)

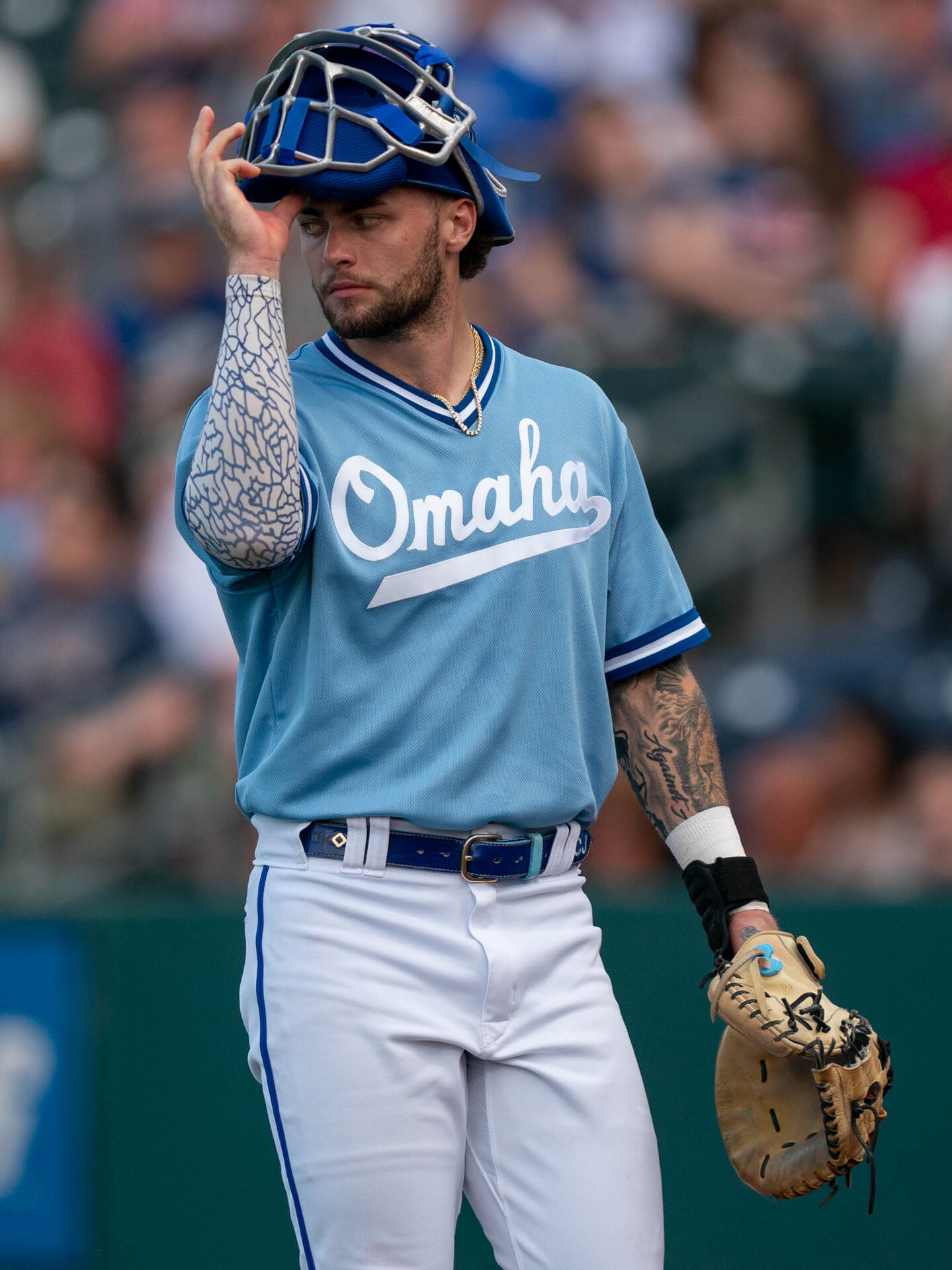
- Jensen with the Omaha Storm Chasers in 2025

Kansas City Royals – No. 22
- Catcher / Designated hitter
- Born: July 3, 2003 (age 23); Kansas City, Missouri, U.S.
- Bats: Left Throws: Right

MLB debut
- September 2, 2025, for the Kansas City Royals

MLB statistics (through 2026 season)
- Batting average: .245
- Home runs: 30
- Runs batted in: 94
- Stats at Baseball Reference

Teams
- Kansas City Royals (2025–present)

Carter James Jensen (born July 3, 2003) is an American professional baseball catcher and designated hitter for the Kansas City Royals of Major League Baseball (MLB). He made his MLB debut in 2025.

== Amateur career ==
Jensen attended Park Hill High School in Kansas City, Missouri, where he played baseball. As a senior in 2021, he hit .387 with one home run and 25 RBI. He committed to play college baseball at Louisiana State University.

== Professional career ==
=== Minor leagues ===
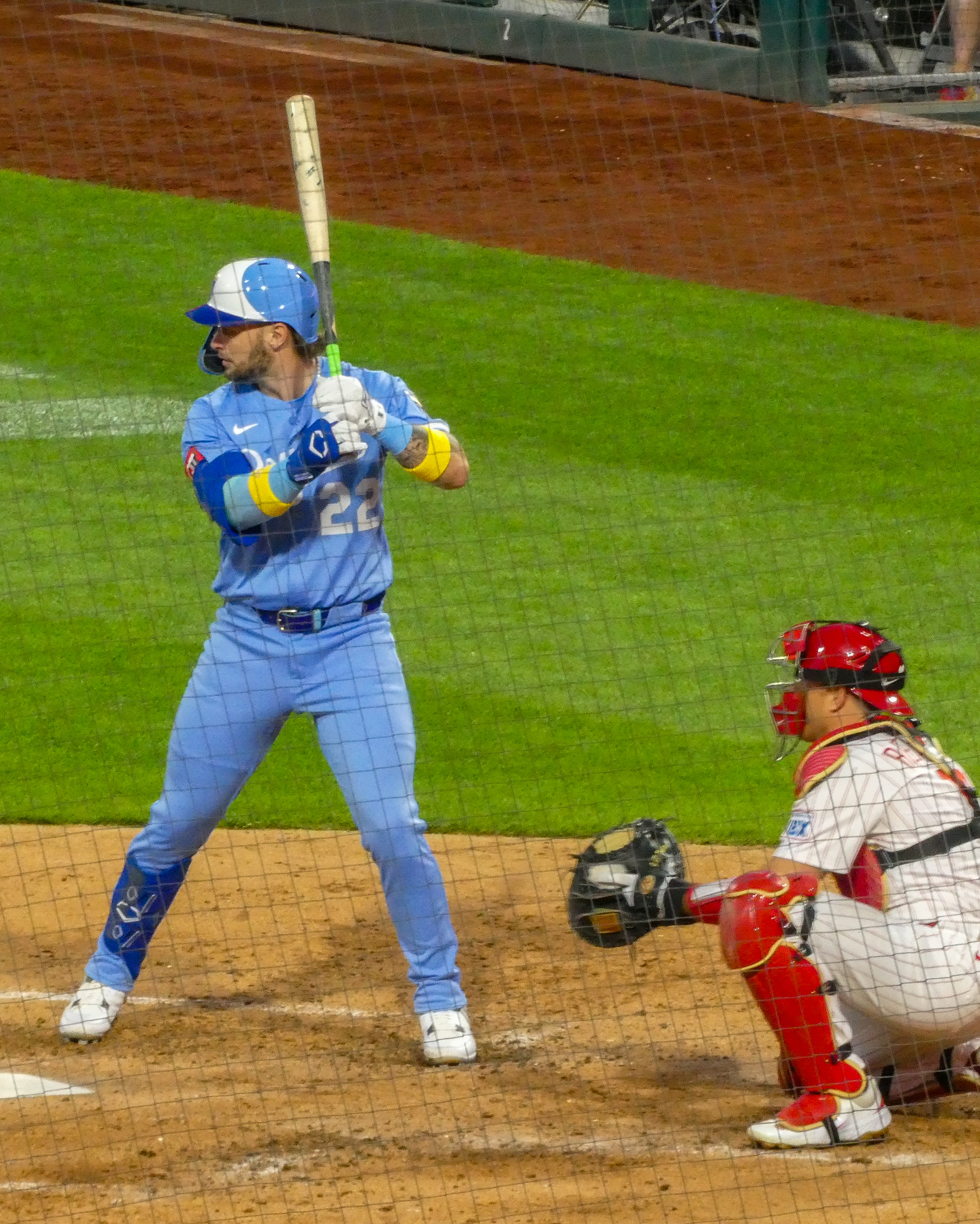
Jensen at bat for the Kansas City Royals against the Philadelphia Phillies in September 2025

The Kansas City Royals selected Jensen in the third round, with the 78th overall pick, of the 2021 Major League Baseball draft. He signed with the Royals and made his professional debut with the Arizona Complex League Royals, hitting .281 over 19 games. He played the 2022 season with the Single-A Columbia Fireflies with whom he batted .226 with 11 home runs and 50 RBI over 113 games, earning All-Star honors.

Jensen spent the 2023 season with the High-A Quad Cities River Bandits. Over 116 games, he hit .211 with 11 home runs and 45 RBI. Jensen was assigned back to Quad Cities to open the 2024 season. In mid-July, he was promoted to the Double-A Northwest Arkansas Naturals. Over 125 games between both teams, Jensen compiled a .259/.359/.450 slash line with 18 home runs, 67 RBI, and 17 stolen bases. Jensen was assigned to Northwest Arkansas to open the 2025 season and was promoted to the Triple-A Omaha Storm Chasers in June. He was selected (alongside Frank Mozzicato) to represent the Royals at the 2025 All-Star Futures Game at Truist Park. Jensen appeared in 111 games between Northwest Arkansas and Omaha, hitting .290 with 20 home runs and 76 RBI.

=== Major leagues ===
==== 2025 ====
On September 1, 2025, the Royals promoted Jensen to the major leagues for the first time. He made his MLB debut the next night at Kauffman Stadium versus the Los Angeles Angels, striking out against Kenley Jansen as a pinch hitter. He recorded his first MLB hit on September 6 off of Thomas Hatch of the Minnesota Twins, an RBI double. On September 16, against the Seattle Mariners, Jensen would hit his first two MLB home runs off of Logan Gilbert and Carlos Vargas, going 3-for-4 with two home runs and three RBI in the 12–5 loss. On September 19, 2025, Jensen was the lead-off batter in the Royals lopsided 20–1 win over the Blue Jays. He went 3–7 with two doubles and two runs batted in. All three of his doubles came within the first three innings, including two in the opening inning, both off Max Scherzer. He returned to living in his childhood home after getting his MLB callup.

Over 60 at-bats for the Royals during his rookie campaign, Jensen hit .300 with three home runs and 13 RBI.

==== 2026 ====
Jensen started the year on the Royals' major league roster as Salvador Perez's backup. Prior to the Royals' fifth game of the season–a day game at home against the Minnesota Twins–Jensen was scratched from the lineup on the account of oversleeping and not getting to the stadium in time for gameday preparations. He was replaced at catcher by Perez, who had been preparing to be the designated hitter for the game and resulted in a shuffle of the rest of the gameday roster. He entered the game in the ninth inning to finish catching for Perez in a 5–1 loss to the Minnesota Twins. He apologized to teammates and the media in the clubhouse after the game.

On July 17, Jensen recorded his first walk-off hit, a single in the tenth inning to score two runs and to secure a 7-6 win over the San Diego Padres. In September, he batted .338 with eight home runs, and was named American League Player of the Month. Jensen appeared in a total of 149 games for the Royals in 2026 and batted .239 with 27 home runs, 81 RBI, and 35 doubles. He placed fifth in American League Rookie of the Year voting.

== Personal life ==
Jensen grew up a Royals fan and attended the 2014 World Series at Kauffman Stadium.

Achievements
Preceded by Tristan Peters	American League Rookie of the Month; September 2026	Most recent
Preceded by Jac Caglianone	American League Player of the Month; September 2026	Most recent
