= Jac Caglianone =

American baseball player (born 2003)

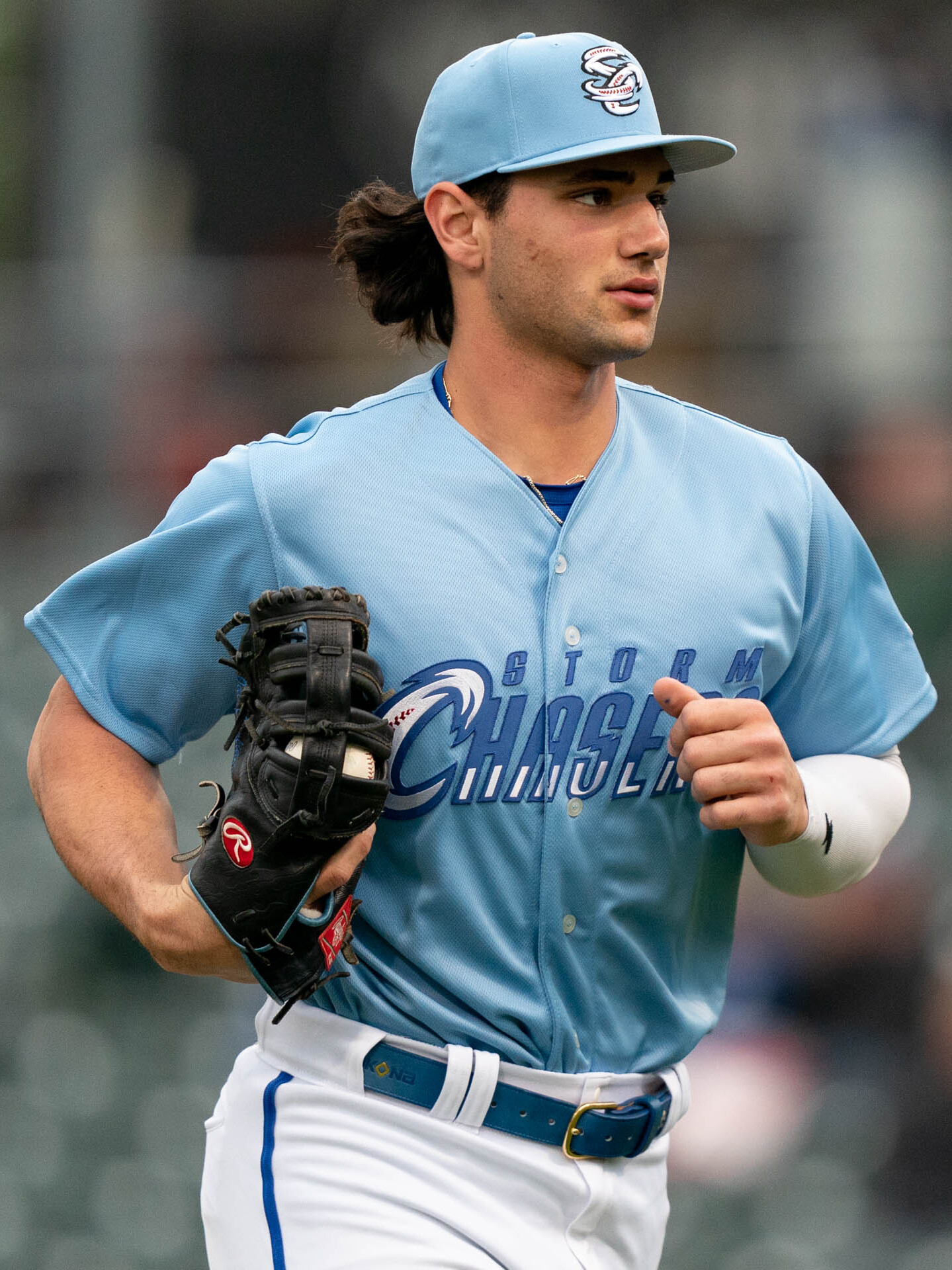
- Caglianone with the Omaha Storm Chasers in 2025

Kansas City Royals – No. 14
- Right fielder / First baseman
- Born: February 9, 2003 (age 23); Tampa, Florida, U.S.
- Bats: Left Throws: Left

MLB debut
- June 3, 2025, for the Kansas City Royals

MLB statistics (through 2026 season)
- Batting average: .251
- Home runs: 30
- Runs batted in: 93
- Stats at Baseball Reference

Teams
- Kansas City Royals (2025–present)

Jeffrey Alan "Jac" Caglianone (/ˈkæɡliːoʊn/ KAG-lee-ohn; born February 9, 2003) is an American professional baseball right fielder and first baseman for the Kansas City Royals of Major League Baseball (MLB) who competes for Italy at the international level. Caglianone played college baseball for the Florida Gators as a first baseman and pitcher. He was selected by the Royals with the sixth overall pick in the 2024 MLB draft and made his MLB debut in 2025.

== Amateur career ==
=== High school career ===
Caglianone grew up in Tampa, Florida, and attended Henry B. Plant High School. As a junior in 2020, he played in Perfect Game's All-American Classic in Oklahoma City, Oklahoma and was named a Florida Athletic Coaches Association All-American and the MLB Network/SiriusXM Two-Way Player of the Year. As a senior, he batted .371 with three home runs and posted a 2.44 ERA with two saves and 65 strikeouts over 37 1/3 innings pitched. Caglianone tore the ulnar collateral ligament in his left elbow while playing in a postseason All-Star game after his senior season, subsequently undergoing Tommy John surgery.

In high school, Caglianone was a two-pitch pitcher who featured a mid-90s fastball projected to average 94 miles per hour (151 km/h) and measured at up to 97–98 miles per hour (156–158 km/h), as well as a slurve-like curveball, while his throws as a first baseman were projected to be 90 miles per hour (140 km/h).

=== College career ===
Caglianone initially planned on redshirting his freshman season at Florida while recovering from his elbow operation, but ultimately played as a designated hitter. He batted .288 with seven home runs during his freshman season. Caglianone returned to pitching during Florida's fall practices in 2022. He entered his sophomore season as both a starting pitcher and as the Gators' starting first baseman. Caglianone was named the NCBWA Player of the Month for February after collecting 15 hits in 35 at-bats with seven home runs and striking out 15 batters over 11 1/3 innings pitched. He broke Florida's single-season home run record after hitting his 27th of the year and finished with 33.

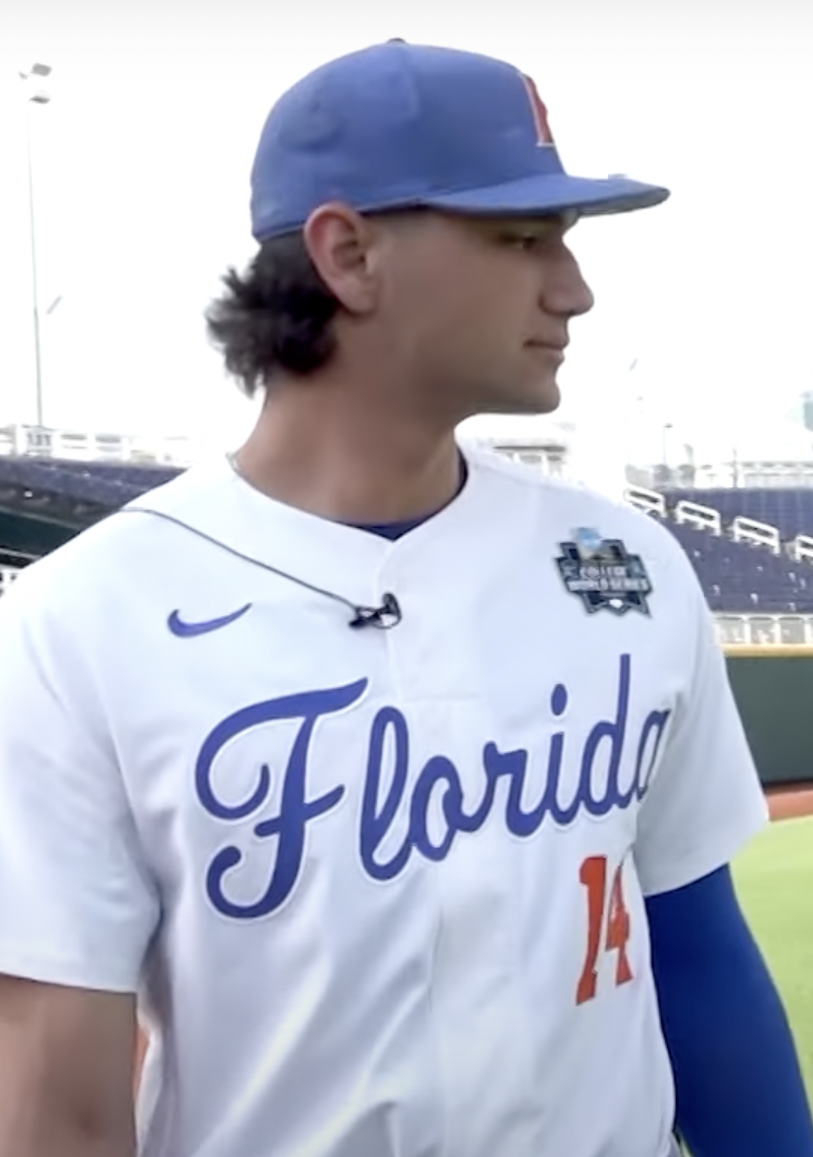
Caglianone with the Florida Gators in 2024

In his junior year in 2024, he hit home runs in nine straight games, including one against Jacksonville that traveled an estimated 516 feet (157 m). This also tied the record for most home runs hit in consecutive games at the NCAA level. Caglianone also surpassed Matt LaPorta for the most career home runs by a Florida player, with 75. As a result of his power at the plate, during the College World Series in Omaha, Nebraska, his opponents would often utilize a defensive shift during his plate appearances, with the third baseman positioned as a fourth outfielder.

== Professional career ==
=== Minor leagues ===
Caglianone was drafted by the Kansas City Royals with the sixth overall pick in the 2024 MLB draft. He signed with the Royals on July 23 and received a $7.21 million signing bonus. Caglianone was assigned to the Quad Cities River Bandits of the High-A Midwest League to begin his professional career.

For the 2025 season, Caglianone was promoted to the Northwest Arkansas Naturals of the Double-A Texas League. He still has yet to pitch at the professional level, instead opting to focus on his development as a position player. On April 10, he recorded a single that at the time was the 12th-hardest-hit ball ever recorded during the Statcast era. On April 25, he played in right field, his first outfield appearance in college or the minor leagues.

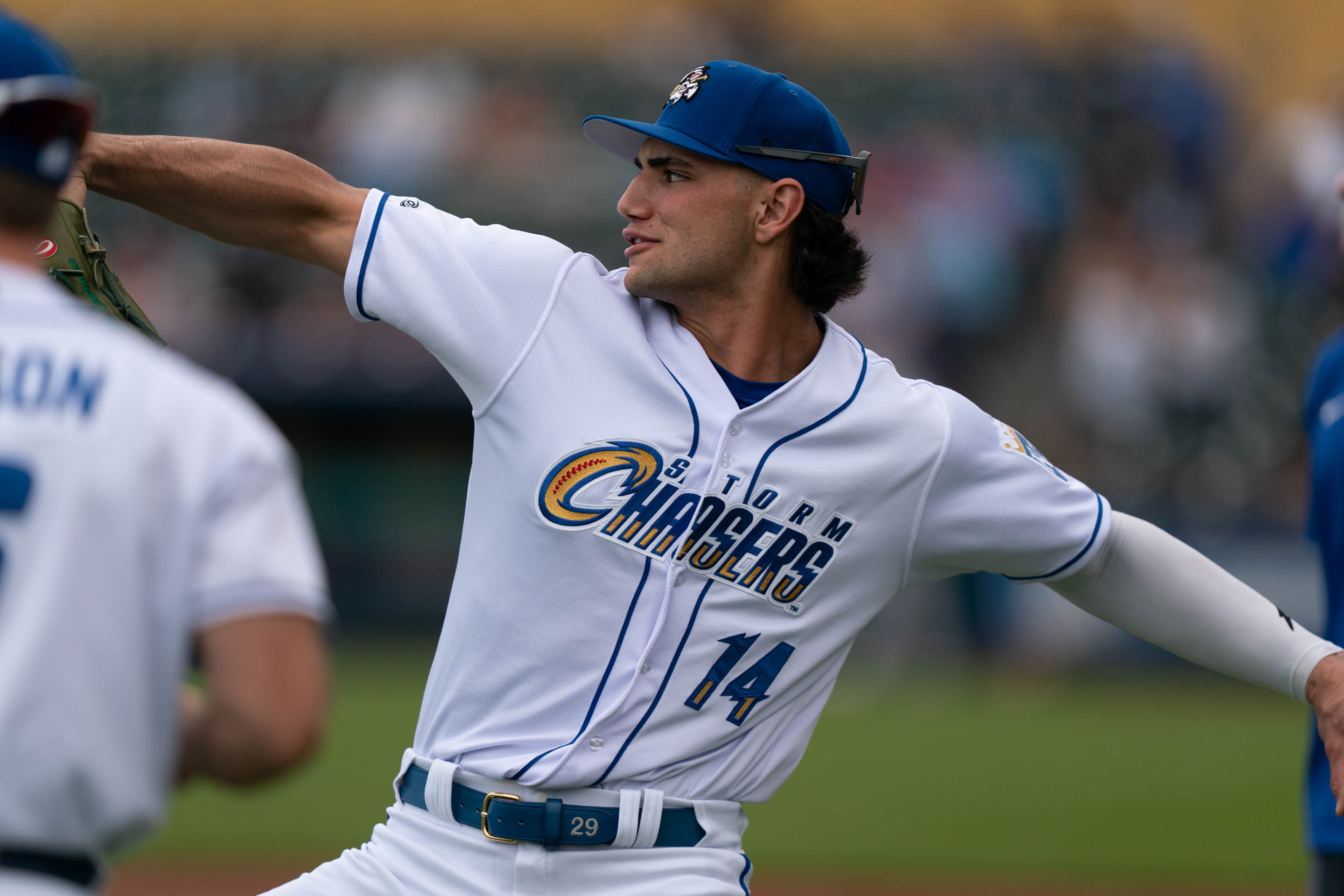
Caglianone with Omaha in 2025

On May 18, Caglianone was promoted to the Omaha Storm Chasers of the Triple-A International League, as the Royals organization felt he was ready to be challenged with a higher level of competition, especially as a hitter; in 38 games with Northwest Arkansas, he hit .322/.394/.553, with eight doubles, nine home runs, and 43 runs batted in, drawing 19 walks and striking out 37 times in 175 plate appearances. In his initial stint with Omaha, he batted .319 with 6 home runs in 12 games, hitting home runs in four consecutive games.

=== Major leagues ===
==== 2025 ====
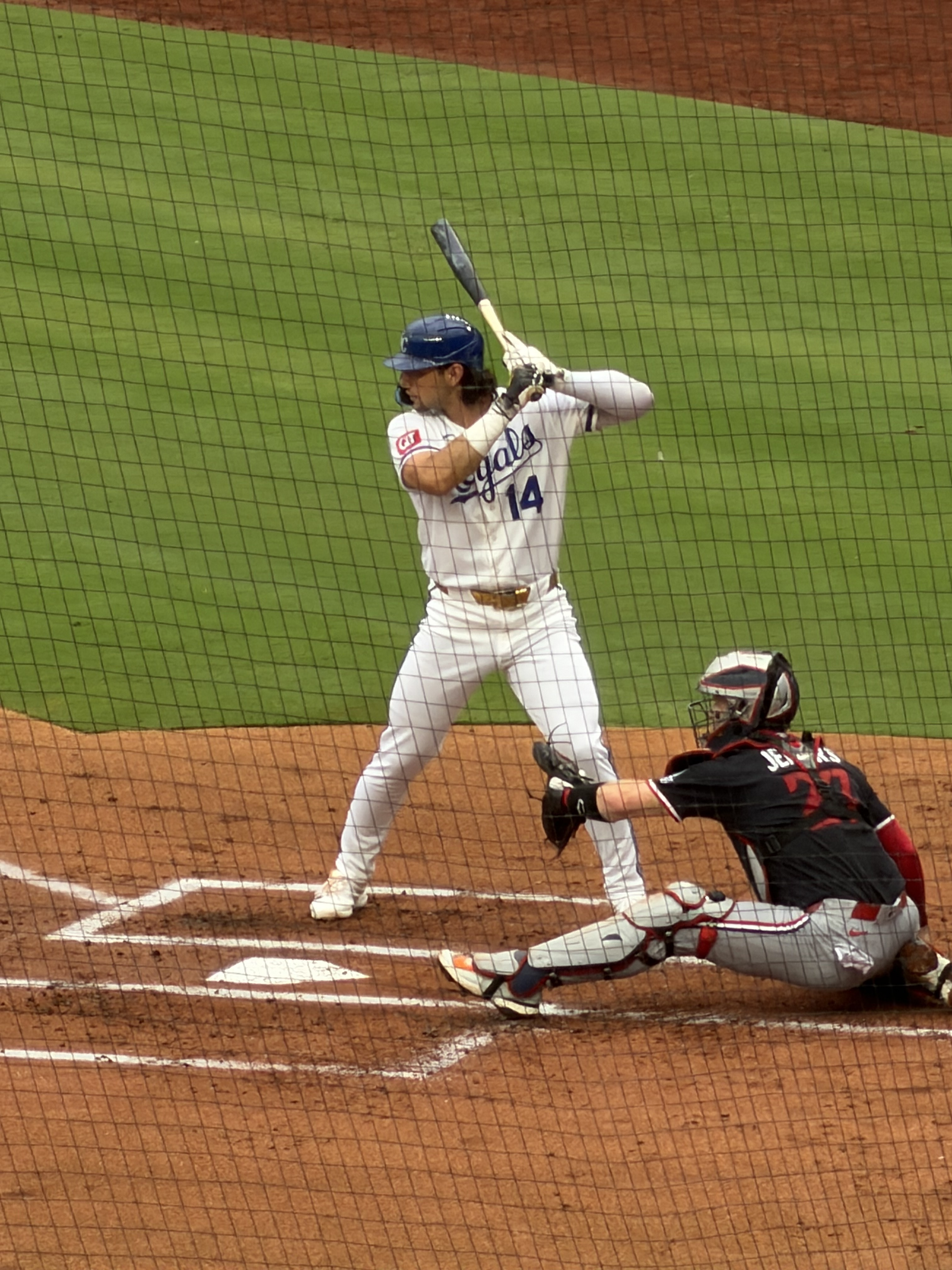
Caglianone batting in August 2026

On June 2, 2025, Caglianone was promoted to the majors. He made his debut on June 3 against the St. Louis Cardinals. He went 0-for-5 in his major league debut. He got his first hit with a double that drove in a run in the top of the fourth inning on June 5 in the first game of a doubleheader, also against the Cardinals. On June 8, Caglianone recorded his first multi-hit game and four-hit game against the Chicago White Sox, going 4-for-4 with 3 singles and a double in a Royals 7–5 victory. He became the seventh MLB rookie with a 4-hit game in 2025. Caglianone hit his first major league home run on June 19, against the Texas Rangers at Globe Life Field. Another home run a few innings later resulted in his first multi-HR game. He injured his left hamstring muscle in late July, sending him to the injured list. Before the injury, he was batting .148 with five home runs. For the season, Caglianone slashed .157/.237/.295 with 7 home runs, 18 RBIs and 1 stolen base in 62 games. He appeared in right field 52 times (51 starts), at first base 10 times (1 start), and at designated hitter 7 times (7 starts). Caglianone had the 6th-worst wins above replacement (WAR) mark in the American League in 2025 according to Baseball Reference, with -1.3 WAR.

==== 2026 ====
On August 8, 2026, Caglianone became the sixth player in Royals history to record four extra–base hits in one game during a 6–3 victory over the Chicago Cubs. He recorded five hits and six RBI in a 13–2 victory over the Toronto Blue Jays on August 27.

== International career ==
Caglianone played for the Italy national baseball team in the 2026 World Baseball Classic.

== Personal life ==
Caglianone is of Italian descent through his father and Puerto Rican descent through his mother. In April 2025, he was named the official ambassador of the Italian American Baseball Foundation. He is engaged to marry professional volleyball player Elli McKissock. Caglianone is a Christian.

Awards and achievements
Preceded by Yordan Alvarez	American League Player of the Month; August 2026	Succeeded by Carter Jensen
