= Alberto Rodríguez (baseball) =

Dominican baseball player (born 2000)

Free agent
- Outfielder
- Born: October 6, 2000 (age 26); Cotuí, Dominican Republic
- Bats: Left Throws: Left

Alberto Rodríguez (born October 6, 2000) is a Dominican Republic professional baseball outfielder who is a free agent.

== Career ==
=== Toronto Blue Jays ===
On July 2, 2017, Rodríguez signed with the Toronto Blue Jays as an international free agent. He made his professional debut the following year with the Dominican Summer League Blue Jays, hitting .254 with five home runs, 34 RBI, and 21 stolen bases across 61 appearances. In 2019, Rodríguez played in 47 games for the rookie-level Gulf Coast League Blue Jays, slashing .301/.364/.422 with two home runs, 29 RBI, and 13 stolen bases. He did not play in a game in 2020 due to the cancellation of the minor league season because of the COVID-19 pandemic.

=== Seattle Mariners ===
On September 1, 2020, the Blue Jays traded Rodríguez to the Seattle Mariners as the player to be named later for a previous trade that saw Toronto acquire Taijuan Walker. He played the 2021 campaign with the Single-A Modesto Nuts and High-A Everett AquaSox, posting a cumulative .289/.379/.470 batting line with 10 home runs, 65 RBI, and 15 stolen bases over 100 games.

On November 18, 2021, the Mariners added Rodríguez to their 40-man roster to protect him from the Rule 5 draft. In 2022, Rodríguez appeared in 119 games for the High-A Everett AquaSox, slashing .261/.336/.396 with 10 home runs and 46 RBI.

On January 17, 2023, Rodríguez was designated for assignment by Seattle following the acquisition of J. B. Bukauskas. On January 24, Rodríguez cleared waivers and was sent outright to High-A Everett. In 118 contests split between Everett and the Double-A Arkansas Travelers, he batted a combined .300/.381/.504 with career-highs in home runs (14) and RBI (85).

Rodríguez returned to Arkansas in 2024, playing in 93 games and batting .241/.287/.329 with three home runs, 47 RBI, and 10 stolen bases. He elected free agency following the season on November 4, 2024.

=== Rieleros de Aguascalientes ===
On April 17, 2025, Rodríguez signed with the Rieleros de Aguascalientes of the Mexican League. In 78 appearances for Aguascalientes, Rodríguez batted .315/.397/.497 with nine home runs, 45 RBI, and nine stolen bases.

=== Kansas City Royals ===
On November 19, 2025, the Kansas City Royals signed Rodríguez to a minor league contract. He made 56 appearance split between the Double–A Northwest Arkansas Naturals and rookie–level Arizona Complex League Royals, batting a cumulative .208/.302/.284 with three home runs, 26 RBI, and one stolen base. Rodríguez was released by the Royals organization on September 15, 2026.
