= Mike Carter Field =

Stadium in Tyler, Texas, US

Coordinates: 32.34244°N 95.32169°W

Mike Carter Field is a stadium in Tyler, Texas. It is primarily used for baseball and was the home of Tyler Wildcatters. The ballpark has a capacity of 4,000 people and opened in 1941. The field is the home of the Tyler Junior College Apaches baseball team.
