= Tyler Wildcatters =

Tyler WildCatters
- Logo

Information
- League: Texas–Louisiana League
- Location: Tyler, Texas
- Ballpark: Mike Carter Field
- Founded: 1994
- Folded: 1997
- Colors: Teal Black
- Mascot: Rigger WildCatter
- General manager: Lee Smith (1994); Joe Scrivner (1995-96); Mark O’Brien (1996–97)
- Manager: Bill Stein (1994); Wayne Krenchicki (1995); Dave Hilton (1996); Darrell Evans (1997)

The Tyler WildCatters were a minor league baseball team located in Tyler, Texas. The team, which existed from 1994 to 1997, played in the independent Texas–Louisiana League, and was un-affiliated with any major league baseball team. Their home stadium was historic Mike Carter Field, which has been home to various professional, semi-professional, and collegiate Baseball teams dating back to 1941. Their founding in 1994 marked the first time Tyler had a baseball team in 39 years.

== Notable WildCatters ==
- Greg Brummett – Played for the WildCatters in 1996; made a brief appearance in 1993 with the Minnesota Twins and San Francisco Giants.
- Larry Carter – Played for the WildCatters in 1994; The only WildCatter to throw a no-hitter (a 4-0 Tyler victory on June 21, 1994, against the Beaumont Bullfrogs); served as WildCatters' pitching coach for all four seasons of the team's existence; played for the San Francisco Giants in 1992.
- Sean Collins – Played for the WildCatters from 1995 to 1997; the WildCatters' all-time leader in runs (176), triples (12) and stolen bases (82); played seven seasons of professional Baseball (1989–1990, 1994–1998) -- peaking at the Double-A level with the Tulsa Drillers in 1998; appeared in the 1991 movie Talent for the Game, starring Edward James Olmos and Lorraine Bracco.
- Darrell Evans – Managed the WildCatters in 1997; played a 19-year major league career from 1969 to 1988 with the Atlanta Braves, San Francisco Giants, and Detroit Tigers.
- Dave Hilton – Managed the WildCatters in 1996; played a four-year major league career with the San Diego Padres beginning in 1972.
- Jessie Hollins – Played for the WildCatters in 1997; appeared with the Chicago Cubs in 1992.
- Billy Johnson – Played for the WildCatters in 1994 and 1996; the WildCatters' all-time pitching leader in victories (17), strikeouts (182) and innings pitched (234.2); played six seasons of professional Baseball (1989–1992, 1994, 1996) -- peaking at the Class A level with the Charleston Wheelers (1990–1991) and the Waterloo Diamonds in 1992.
- Wayne Krenchicki – Managed the WildCatters in 1995; played in the majors from 1979 to 1986 with the Baltimore Orioles, Cincinnati Reds, Detroit Tigers, and Montreal Expos.
- Ken Patterson – Played for the WildCatters in 1996; played a six-year major league career from 1988 to 1994 with the Chicago White Sox, Chicago Cubs and California Angels.
- Todd Rizzo – Played for the WildCatters in 1994; played for the Chicago White Sox from 1998 to 1999.
- Ken Shamburg – Played for the WildCatters from 1994 to 1996; the WildCatters' all-time leader in games played (286), at-bats (1,061), hits (317), doubles (82), home runs (45), runs batted in (192) and walks (134); played eleven seasons of professional Baseball (1989–1999) -- peaking at the Triple-A level with the Rochester Red Wings for portions of the 1990–1992 seasons and with the Denver Zephyrs in 1992.
- Bill Stein – Managed the WildCatters in 1994; played a 13-year career beginning in 1972 with the St. Louis Cardinals, Chicago White Sox, Seattle Mariners, and Texas Rangers.

== Yearly Records ==
Season	W	L	Win %	Place First/Second Half	Attendance
1994	42	46	.477	T-2nd/3rd	55,914
1995	48	52	.480	3rd/4th	55,251
1996	36	63	.364	6th/5th	58,572
1997	48	40	.545	2nd/3rd	71,435

== All-Time WildCatters Player Register ==
- James Baldridge, RHP (1994)
- Rob Batchler, RHP (1995–1996)
- Michael Benavidez, RHP (1997)
- Joe Bertucci, UTL (1995)
- Britton Bonneau, 2B-SS (1994)
- Luther Bowen, RHP (1997)
- John Bowles, 1B-3B (1996)
- Jeff Brown, LHP (1994)
- Greg Brummett, RHP (1996)
- Ron Caridad, RHP (1997)
- Larry Carter, RHP (1994)
- Tommy Carter, LHP (1996)
- Chris Cassels, 1B-3B-DH (1997)
- Ramon Cedeno, OF (1997)
- Matt Cesare, SS (1994)
- John Codrington, RHP (1997)
- Billy Coleman, RHP (1997)
- Sean Collins, OF-2B (1995–1997)
- Troy Conkle, SS-RHP (1994–1996)
- Jim Cooney, C-1B (1996)
- James Craver, OF (1994)
- Derek Dana, C (1994–1995)
- Ray Davis, RHP (1997)
- Danny DiPace, OF-3B (1997)
- Sean Doran, RHP (1994)
- Steve Emmons, 1B (1997)
- Cody Farr, LHP (1994–1995)
- Jason Farrow, RHP (1997)
- Rich Faulks, LHP (1994)
- Eric Ford, 2B-3B (1995)
- Gary Frank, 2B (1997)
- Cory Gafford, C (1997)
- Javier Gomez, RHP (1997)
- Clay Gould, OF (1994–1995)
- Rafael Guerrero, OF-1B (1997)
- Lincoln Gumbs, UTL (1997)
- Chris Hancock, LHP (1995–1996)
- Richie Hare, OF (1996)
- James Harris, 3B (1994–1995)
- Kelly Hartman, LHP (1997)
- Tim Haugh, LHP (1994–1995)
- Derek Henderson, 3B (1996–1997)
- Erin Higgins, LHP (1996)
- Jessie Hollins, RHP (1997)
- Rod Huffman, RHP (1994)
- Todd Ingram, RHP (1996)
- Ray Jackson, OF (1994)
- Billy Johnson, RHP (1994, 1996)
- Jack Johnson, C (1997)
- Brett Jones, RHP (1994–1995)
- Rich Kelley, LHP (1995)
- Ron Kitchen, RHP (1996–1997)
- Josef Klam, C (1996)
- Kerry Knox, LHP (1995, 1997)
- Tom Koerick, C (1996)
- Damian Leyva, LHP (1994)
- Steve Long, RHP (1996)
- Steve Maddock, RHP (1997)
- Aaron Martin, LHP (1997)
- Jerry Martin, RHP (1997)
- Paul Meador, LHP (1995–1996)
- Mark Mesewicz, LHP (1996)
- Troy Mooney, RHP (1994)
- Jeff Motes, 2B-SS (1996)
- Jason Motley, 1B (1996)
- Billy Norcross, 1B (1994–1995)
- Joe Norris, RHP (1997)
- Clemente Núñez, RHP (1997)
- Steve Ortiz, LHP (1997)
- Ken Patterson, LHP-DH (1996)
- Steve Peck, RHP (1995)
- Carlos Perez, 1B-OF (1996–1997)
- Sandy Pichardo, 2B-SS (1997)
- Dan Popple, RHP (1995)
- Joe Porcelli, LHP (1994)
- Dan Rambo, RHP (1995)
- Zach Randle, 2B-SS (1995)
- Ronnie Rantz, LHP (1995)
- O.J. Rhone, OF (1995)
- Tony Rich, 2B (1996)
- Elvin Rivera, RHP (1995)
- Todd Rizzo, LHP (1994)
- Chris Rusciano, RHP (1996)
- Fabian Salmon, RHP (1995)
- Todd Samples, OF (1995)
- Tom Schneider, LHP (1995)
- Ken Shamburg, OF-1B (1994–1996)
- John Simmons, LHP (1996)
- Alex Slattery, RHP (1996)
- Jason Smiga, SS (1996–1997)
- Joel Smith, C (1994)
- Karl Stanley, RHP (1994)
- Earl Steinmetz, RHP (1997)
- Terry Tewell, C (1995)
- Matt Torres, C (1994)
- John Turner, 2B-3B (1994–1995)
- Rocky Turner, OF (1996)
- Mark Tuttle, RHP (1995)
- Colby Weaver, C (1996)
- Brian Williams, RHP (1996)
- Lanny Williams, UTL (1994–1996)
- Doug Wollenburg, 2B (1996)
- Pat Woodruff, OF (1994–1995)
