= Clemente Núñez =

Dominican Republic baseball player (born 1975)

Clemente Núñez Beltre (born February 10, 1975, in Bonao, Dominican Republic) is a former professional baseball pitcher who was the first player ever signed by the Florida Marlins. He was signed at the age of 16 out of the Dominican Republic on December 16, 1991.

Sporting an 88-mile-an-hour fastball when he was first signed, Núñez got as far as AA before calling his baseball career quits in 1996. This right-hander, standing at 5'11" and weighing 165 pounds, never quite lived up to what he was supposed to be - in his final season, for example, he went 2–7 with a 5.47 ERA, giving up 119 hits in 97 innings of work with the Portland Sea Dogs. Perhaps the highlight of his career was a no-hitter he threw on May 28, 1995, against the West Palm Beach Expos. After pitching for the independent Tyler Wildcatters in 1997, he was out of professional baseball.
