= Larry Sutton =

American baseball player (born 1970)

- Outfielder / First baseman
- Born: May 14, 1970 (age 56); West Covina, California, U.S.
- Batted: Left Threw: Left

Professional debut
- MLB: August 17, 1997, for the Kansas City Royals
- KBO: April 2, 2005, for the Hyundai Unicorns

Last appearance
- MLB: June 1, 2004, for the Florida Marlins
- KBO: May 19, 2007, for the Kia Tigers

MLB statistics
- Batting average: .236
- Home runs: 12
- Runs batted in: 78

KBO statistics
- Batting average: .280
- Home runs: 56
- Runs batted in: 173
- Stats at Baseball Reference

Teams
- As player: Kansas City Royals (1997–1999); St. Louis Cardinals (2000–2001); Oakland Athletics (2002); Florida Marlins (2004); Hyundai Unicorns (2005–2006); Kia Tigers (2007); As manager: Lotte Giants (2021–2023)

Larry James Sutton (born May 14, 1970) is an American former professional baseball outfielder and first baseman. He played in Major League Baseball (MLB) for the Kansas City Royals, Oakland Athletics, St. Louis Cardinals, and Florida Marlins. He also played in the KBO League for the Hyundai Unicorns and Kia Tigers.

== Career ==
Sutton attended Mater Dei High School and the University of Illinois. He was a 21st round draft pick by the Kansas City Royals in 1992. In 1994, Sutton was the Most Valuable Player of the Class-A Carolina League, and his team, the Wilmington Blue Rocks won the Carolina League championship. The team featured future major leaguers Johnny Damon and Sal Fasano. In 2000, he hit two home runs in the Triple-A World Series for Memphis against Indianapolis.

In 572 career Major League at-bats, Sutton compiled a .236 batting average.

Sutton played professional baseball in Korea for three seasons, from 2005 to 2007. His best year was 2005, when he hit .292 with 35 home runs and 102 RBI for the Hyundai Unicorns. His home run and RBI totals, as well as his OPS (1.003), led all hitters in the KBO League that year, and he earned a KBO League Golden Glove Award for 2005.

In 2012, Sutton managed the DSL Pirates2.

In October 2019, South Korean baseball club Lotte Giants hired Sutton as their new minor league manager.

In 2024, Sutton was named as the manager for the ACL Royals the rookie-level affiliate of the Kansas City Royals.

Preceded by Heo Moon-hoi	Lotte Giants Manager; 2021-2023	Succeeded by Kim Tae-hyoung
