= Hyungchan Um =

South Korean baseball player (born 2004)

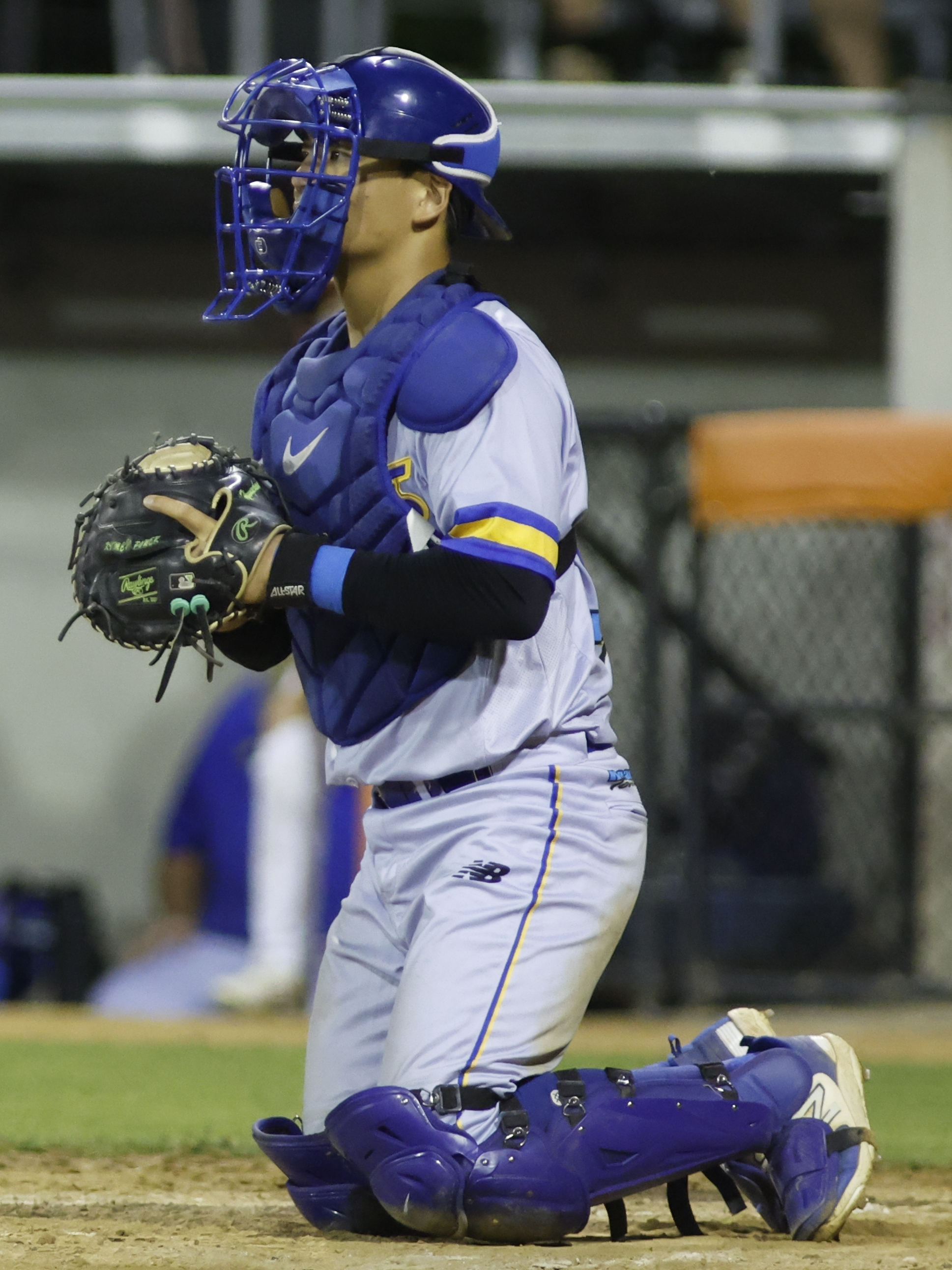
- Um with the Brisbane Bandits in 2024

Kansas City Royals
- Catcher
- Born: April 24, 2004 (age 22); Seoul, South Korea
- Bats: Right Throws: Right

- Hyungchan Um
- Hangul: 엄형찬
- Hanja: 嚴炯贊
- RR: Eom Hyeongchan
- MR: Ŏm Hyŏngch'an

Hyungchan Um (Korean: 엄형찬; born April 24, 2004) is a South Korean professional baseball catcher in the Kansas City Royals organization.

== Amateur career ==
Um grew up in Seoul, South Korea and attended Gyeonggi Commercial High School. As a senior, he batted .390 with three home runs and 30 RBIs in 21 official games. He also caught 101.2 innings while throwing out 70 percent of would-be base-stealers. For his performance on the year, he was presented the Lee Man-soo Award as the best catcher in South Korean high school baseball.

== Professional career ==
=== Minor Leagues ===
Um signed with the Kansas City Royals as an international free agent in July 2022. He made his professional debut in 2023 with the Arizona Complex League Royals. In June 2024, he was promoted to the Columbia Fireflies of the Single A Carolina League for the final two months of the 2024 season after batting .310 and slugging .500 with four home runs in the Arizona Complex League. During that time, Um entered the organizational prospect rankings by MLB Pipeline, Baseball America, and FanGraphs.

=== Australian Baseball League ===
After the 2023 Minor League regular season, Um played in the Australian Baseball League with the Brisbane Bandits. He batted .248 with four home runs, and was named one of the finalists for the 2023-24 ABL Catcher-of-the-Year Award after handling the Bandits pitching staff for a full season. Um returned for a second stint with the Bandits for the 2024-25 season. He led the league in total bases (78), finished second in home runs (10), while ranking in the top five in RBI, slugging percentage, on-base plus slugging, base hits, and extra-base hits. The Bandits named him the organization's Offensive Player of the Year. Um and his teammate Brennon McNair became the first duo to hit double-digits in home runs since the 2018-19 season.
