= Larry Carter =

American baseball player & coach (born 1965)

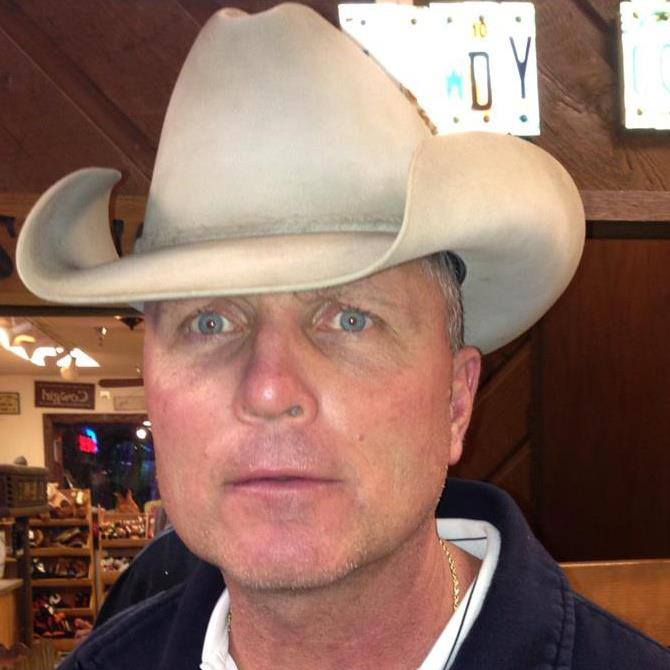
- Pitcher / Coach
- Born: May 22, 1965 (age 61); Charleston, West Virginia, U.S.
- Batted: Right Threw: Right

MLB debut
- September 6, 1992, for the San Francisco Giants

Last MLB appearance
- October 3, 1992, for the San Francisco Giants

MLB statistics
- Win–loss record: 1–5
- Earned run average: 4.64
- Strikeouts: 21
- Stats at Baseball Reference

Teams
- As player: San Francisco Giants (1992); As coach: Kansas City Royals (2020–2022)

Larry Gene Carter (born May 22, 1965) is an American professional baseball pitcher and coach. He is formerly the bullpen coach for the Kansas City Royals of Major League Baseball (MLB). He played in the San Francisco Giants organization for six years and made his major league debut in 1992.

== Career ==
Carter attended Ravenswood High School in West Virginia. After earning all-state honors at Ravenswood, he played at Alderson–Broaddus College for two years before transferring to West Virginia State. Most sources from the time of the draft agree that he did not play at West Virginia State before being drafted but he has also been reported to have played one or as many as two years at State. He was originally drafted in the tenth round of the 1986 Major League Baseball draft by the St. Louis Cardinals but, after an arm injury, was released. He did not play at all during the 1987 season. He was signed by the San Francisco Giants after a tryout in 1988. He was named Texas League Pitcher of the year in 1991 while playing for the Shreveport Captains.

In 1994, he became the first player signed by the Tyler Wildcatters of the independent Texas–Louisiana League. He served as a player-coach.

After his playing career was completed, Carter began work as a pitching coach within the Kansas City Royals minor league system. 2015 will be Carter's 18th season in the Royals organization including 11 years at the Double-A level, with Wichita (2002–07) and Northwest Arkansas (2008–12).

He was a member of three recent Championship teams, with the Triple-A Omaha Storm Chasers in 2014 and 2013, and with the Double-A Northwest Arkansas Naturals in 2010. He is credited with assisting in the tutelage of several of the Royals current pitchers, including Danny Duffy, Yordano Ventura, Kelvin Herrera, and Greg Holland. Larry was also the recipient of the "Mike Coolbaugh Texas League Coach of the Year" in the 2008 season. He also was named the Royals' 2014 Dick Howser Player Development Person of the Year.

He served as the Royals' minor league pitching coordinator from 2015 through 2019. He was promoted to bullpen coach of the Royals prior to the 2020 season.

In 2023, he was named as pitching coach for the Northwest Arkansas Naturals the Double-A affiliate of the Kansas City Royals.

== Personal ==
Carter was born in Charleston, West Virginia and grew up in Rand. Today, he lives with his wife Jennifer, sons Matthew and Andrew, and their two Weimaraners in suburban Dallas. In his spare time, he enjoys rooting for the Pittsburgh Steelers and West Virginia Mountaineers.
