= Ramón Castro (third baseman) =

Venezuelan baseball player (born 1979)

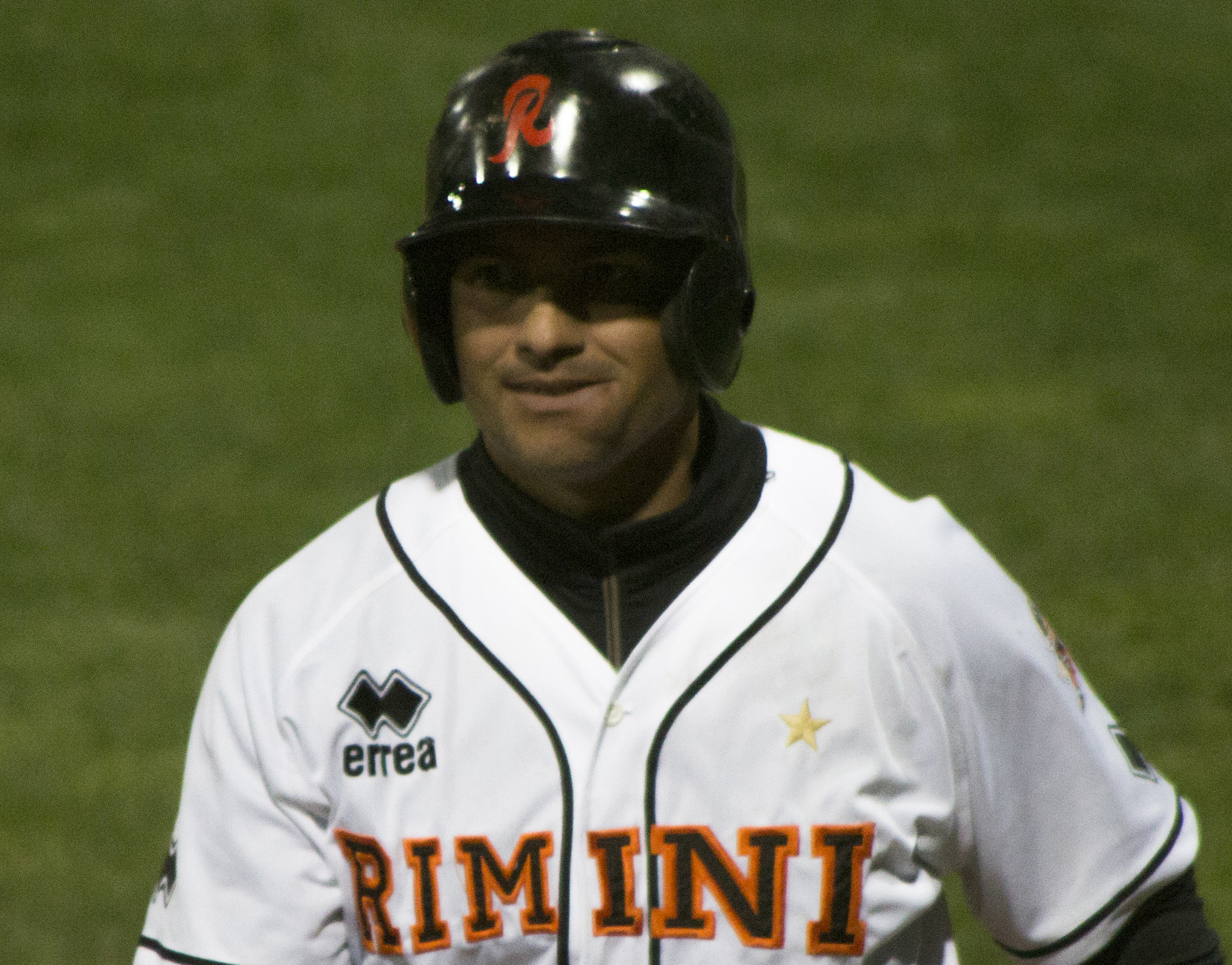
- Castro with Rimini Baseball Club
- Infielder
- Born: October 23, 1979 (age 46); Valencia, Carabobo, Venezuela
- Batted: Right Threw: Right

MLB debut
- June 21, 2004, for the Oakland Athletics

Last MLB appearance
- July 26, 2004, for the Oakland Athletics

MLB statistics
- Batting average: .133
- Home runs: 0
- Runs batted in: 3
- Stats at Baseball Reference

Teams
- Oakland Athletics (2004)
Medals
Men's baseball
Representing Venezuela
Central American and Caribbean Games
Bronze medal – third place	2006 Cartagena	Team

Ramón Alfredo Castro Muñoz (born October 23, 1979) is a Venezuelan former infielder. He has played in Major League Baseball (MLB) for the Oakland Athletics.

== Baseball career ==
=== Atlanta Braves ===
Castro was originally signed as a free agent with the Atlanta Braves in 1996. After six years in their minor league system, he was granted free agency.

=== Oakland Athletics ===
Castro signed with the Oakland Athletics in 2003. He was called up from the Triple-A Sacramento River Cats and made his MLB debut on June 22, 2004, as a Pinch Hitter for Bobby Crosby. He played in his final game as a Defensive Replacement at Shortstop for Bobby Crosby for the Athletics a month later on July 26, 2004. He Wore #47 & played in nine games for the Athletics. With Sacramento, Castro batted .319 (37-for-116) with 7 home run, 22 RBI, 21 runs, 12 doubles, 3 triples and one stolen base. With the Athletics, he hit .333 (5-for-15) with three RBI, two run, and two double in nine games.

=== Washington Nationals ===
In 2005, Castro played in the Washington Nationals organization, but was suspended 105 games in July and fined an undisclosed amount for violating the steroids policy.

=== Newark Bears ===
He previously played for the Newark Bears from 2007 to 2008, being named the Most Valuable Player of the 2008 Atlantic League All-Star Game after hitting two home runs. In 2008, he hit .352 with 23 home runs and 84 RBI.

=== San Francisco Giants ===
On June 26, 2009, Castro signed a minor league contract with the San Francisco Giants.

=== Guerreros de Oaxaca ===
He played in five games with the Guerreros de Oaxaca in 2010.

=== York Revolution ===
Castro set Revolution season records in 2010 with a .339 batting average, 37 doubles and a .437 on-base percentage, ranking second in the Atlantic League in all three categories. His performance earned him First Team Atlantic League All-Star honors for the third time in his career. The Valencia, Venezuela native also had a 68-game errorless streak from May 15, 2010, through July 29, 2010. Then, he went on to bat .375 in the 2010 postseason. His final highlight was driving in the championship-clinching run on a tenth-inning sacrifice fly during Game 3 of the Atlantic League Championship Series at Bridgeport Bluefish.

=== Rimini Baseball Club ===
Castro batted .328 (397-for-1396) in 1,396 Atlantic League games before joining the Rimini Baseball Club of the Italian Baseball League in 2013.

=== Bridgeport Bluefish ===
Castro signed with the Bridgeport Bluefish for the 2014 season. Castro played in 127 games for the Bluefish.

=== Kansas City Royals ===
On March 24, 2015, Castro signed a minor league deal with the Kansas City Royals. He did not make an appearance for the organization and elected free agency following the season on November 6.

== Coaching Career ==
In 2015, he was named as a coach for the Idaho Falls Chukars the Low-A affiliate of the Kansas City Royals he remained in that role through 2016. In 2017, he was named as the Chukars bench coach.

In 2018, he was reassigned to be the hitting coach of the AZL Royals the Royals rookie-level affiliate. He remained as a hitting coach for their rookie affiliates through the 2024 season.

In 2025, he was named as the hitting coach for the Columbia Fireflies the Royals Single-A affiliate.

== See also ==
- List of Major League Baseball players from Venezuela
