= Frank Mozzicato =

American baseball player (born 2003)

Kansas City Royals
- Pitcher
- Born: June 19, 2003 (age 23); Hartford, Connecticut, U.S.
- Bats: Left Throws: Left

Frank Mozzicato (born June 19, 2003) is an American professional baseball pitcher in the Kansas City Royals organization.

== Amateur career ==
Mozzicato attended East Catholic High School in Manchester, Connecticut, and pitched for the school's baseball team. He committed to attend the University of Connecticut on a college baseball scholarship with the Connecticut Huskies baseball team. In his senior year of high school, Mozzicato's draft stock rose significantly after he threw four consecutive no-hitters. That year, he led his team to a 25–0 season and the Connecticut Class M State Championship; in the championship game, he struck out 17 batters and only allowed one hit. He also was on the only team in Connecticut history to go 25–0. As a senior, Mozzicato recorded a 0.16 earned run average with 135 strikeouts over 55 2/3 innings pitched.

== Professional career ==
The Kansas City Royals selected Mozzicato in the first round, with the seventh overall selection, of the 2021 Major League Baseball draft. He signed with the Royals on July 17, 2021, receiving a $3.55 million signing bonus.

Mozzicato opened the 2022 season in extended spring training. In mid-May, he was assigned to the Columbia Fireflies of the Single-A Carolina League to make his professional debut. Over 19 starts for Columbia, he went 2–6 with a 4.30 ERA and 89 strikeouts over 69 innings.

Mozzicato returned to Columbia in 2023. In July, he was promoted to the Quad Cities River Bandits of the High-A Midwest League. Over 21 starts between the two teams, Mozzicato pitched to a 2–9 record, a 4.65 ERA, and 130 strikeouts over 93 innings. He returned to Quad Cities for the 2024 season, going 5–10 with a 3.45 ERA over 22 starts, also being awarded a Gold Glove award. Mozzicato was assigned back to Quad Cities to open the 2025 season, with whom he went 1-0 with a 1.24 ERA across seven starts, and was promoted to the Northwest Arkansas Naturals of the Double-A Texas League in May. He was selected to represent the Royals (alongside Carter Jensen) at the All-Star Futures Game at Truist Park. Mozzicato appeared in 17 games (13 starts) for Northwest Arkansas and posted a 2-5 record, a 7.46 ERA, 48 strikeouts, and 53 walks across 56 2/3 innings.

== Personal life ==
Mozzicato's brother, Anthony, also pitched for East Catholic High School's baseball team. Anthony pitches for the Central Connecticut Blue Devils baseball team.

His family owns Mozzicato's Bakery which has several locations in and around Hartford, Connecticut.
