= Josh Hammond (baseball) =

American baseball player (born 2006)

Kansas City Royals
- Shortstop
- Born: September 21, 2006 (age 19); High Point, North Carolina, U.S.
- Bats: Right Throws: Right

Joshua Matthew Hammond (born September 21, 2006) is an American professional baseball Shortstop in the Kansas City Royals organization.

== Career ==
Hammond attended Wesleyan Christian Academy in High Point, North Carolina. He played shortstop and was a pitcher in high school. In 2023, he was named the MVP of the Prep Baseball Report All-American Game at American Family Field. In Summer 2024, he played with the USA Baseball's 18U National Team.

Hammond was drafted 28th overall by the Kansas City Royals in the 2025 Major League Baseball draft. Despite being committed to play college baseball at Wake Forest University, Hammond signed with the Royals for a $3.19 million bonus on July 21, 2025.
