= Northwest Arkansas Naturals =

- Founded in 2008; Springdale, Arkansas
Team logo
Cap insignia

Minor league affiliations
- Class: Double-A (2008–present)
- League: Texas League (2008–present)
- Division: North Division

Major league affiliations
- Team: Kansas City Royals (2008–present)

Minor league titles
- League titles (2): 2010; 2021
- Division titles (4): 2009; 2010; 2015; 2016
- First-half titles (3): 2010; 2015; 2017
- Second-half titles (5): 2008; 2009; 2010; 2011; 2016

Team data
- Name: Northwest Arkansas Naturals (2008–present)
- Colors: Red, yellow, dark blue, light blue, and white
- Ballpark: Arvest Ballpark (2008–present)
- Owner/ Operator: Rich Products Corporation
- General manager: Justin Cole
- Manager: Brooks Conrad
- Website: milb.com/northwest-arkansas

The Northwest Arkansas Naturals are a Minor League Baseball team based in Springdale, Arkansas. The team is a member of the Texas League, and serves as the Double-A affiliate of the Kansas City Royals. The Naturals play at Arvest Ballpark, which opened in 2008 and is located at the intersection of Gene George Boulevard and Watkins Avenue. The team relocated from Wichita, Kansas, in 2008, where it was known as the Wichita Wranglers.

== Origin ==
The Wichita Wranglers had struggled with low attendance numbers and an aging Lawrence–Dumont Stadium throughout Bob Rich Jr.'s 18-year ownership of the team. In 2006, he sought a move to Springdale, contingent on a citizen vote to approve financing for a new stadium.

The movement to bring a professional baseball team to Springdale had counted on the support of Ronnie Floyd, influential pastor of local megachurch First Baptist Church of Springdale. However, Floyd pulled his support in June 2006 after it was discovered the team would serve alcohol at games, making professional baseball a contentious and evenly split issue in northwest Arkansas. The July vote on a measure to extend a one-cent sales tax to help raise $50 million for the stadium passed by only fifteen votes.

== Team name ==
The team's nickname plays off the state's nickname as the "Natural State," as well as the Robert Redford film, The Natural. The Rich Family owes much of its baseball success to the film. In 1983, Bob Rich Jr. bought the Double-A Buffalo Bisons, who had suffered low attendance the previous season, for $100,000. That year, Hollywood producers approached Rich about filming scenes for The Natural at Buffalo's War Memorial Stadium. Following the release of the film, local interest in the team rose and attendance at the Bisons' games nearly tripled. Rich was then able to finance the Bisons' move to the Triple-A American Association. In something of a coincidence, the Triple-A Bisons were formerly the Wichita Aeros, meaning Rich has purchased two teams that had played previously in Wichita, Kansas.

The "Naturals" name was chosen after receiving 33 percent of the votes in an online fan poll, beating the second-place choice, "Thunder Chickens," by six percent. The "Thunder Chickens" moniker was a nod to Springdale-based Tyson Foods, which is the nation's largest supplier of poultry products, and to the region's poultry industry. Every season, the team embraces the Thunder Chickens brand for a single game with matching uniforms and merchandise.

== Play as the Naturals ==
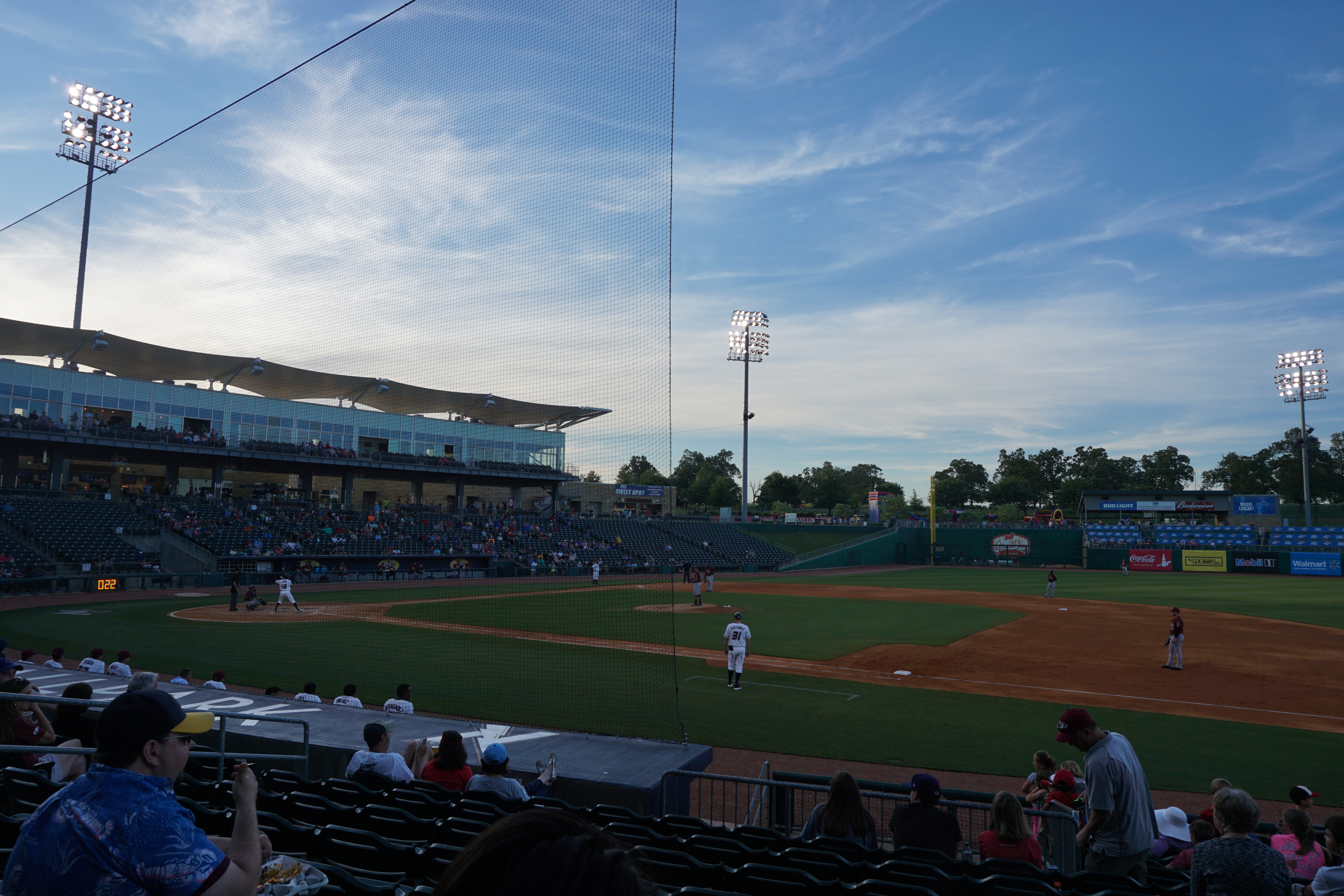
Northwest Arkansas playing against the Frisco RoughRiders in May 2017

The Naturals had early success, advancing to the playoffs in 2009 and 2010. In 2009, the Naturals won the North Division title, but lost in the Texas League championship series to the Midland RockHounds. In 2010, the Naturals swept the first and second-half titles, won the North Division title for a second straight year, and avenged their loss to Midland in 2009, winning the Texas League title in a 3–1 series victory over the RockHounds.

On June 8, 2008, pitcher Jeff Fulchino became the first former Natural to play in Major League Baseball, throwing a scoreless inning in relief during a 6–3 Royals loss to the New York Yankees at Yankee Stadium.

In conjunction with Major League Baseball's restructuring of Minor League Baseball in 2021, the Naturals were organized into the Double-A Central. Though finishing the 2021 season in second place in the Northern Division at 64–55, the two teams with the highest winning percentages in the regular season competed in a best-of-five series to determine the league champion. With the circuit's second-best record, the Naturals faced and defeated the Wichita Wind Surge, three games to zero, to win the Double-A Central championship. MJ Melendez won the league Most Valuable Player Award, and Bobby Witt Jr. was selected as its Top MLB Prospect. In 2022, the Double-A Central became known as the Texas League, the name historically used by the regional circuit prior to the 2021 reorganization.

== Stadium ==
Arvest Ballpark was designed by Populous out of its Kansas City, Missouri, office. It cost $33 million to build, while the rest of the $50 million approved by Springdale voters went toward road and infrastructure improvements. The stadium seats 6,500, but additional berm areas allow a maximum capacity of about 7,800.

== Roster ==
Northwest Arkansas Naturals roster
Players	Coaches/Other
Pitchers: 32 Felix Arronde; 11 Drew Beam; 23 Zachary Cawyer; 40 Dennis Colleran; 28 Grant Gambrell; -- Tyson Guerrero; 46 Chase Jessee; 61 Brandon Johnson; 25 Justin Lamkin; 57 Augusto Mendieta; 51 Tommy Molsky; 31 Caden Monke; 47 Andrew Morones; 17 Frank Mozzicato; 33 Hunter Owen; 53 Hunter Patteson; 44 Anthony Simonelli; 63 Steven Zobac *; Catchers: 38 Jorge Alfaro; 27 Canyon Brown; 12 Omar Hernández; Infielders: 14 Colton Becker; 3 Justin Johnson; 8 Sam Kulasingam; 2 Jack Pineda; 9 Daniel Vazquez; Outfielders: 13 Spencer Nivens; 1 Carson Roccaforte; 24 Alberto Rodríguez; 19 Connor Scott	Manager: 22 Brooks Conrad; Coaches: 34 Larry Carter (pitching); 52 Chris Corbett (assistant hitting & coach); 15 Andy LaRoche (hitting); 43 Anthony Silkwood (assistant pitching); 60-day injured list: -- Nate Ackenhausen; 29 Christian Chamberlain; -- Javi Vaz; 7-day injured list; * On Kansas City Royals 40-man roster; ~ Development list; # Rehab assignment; ∞ Reserve list; ‡ Restricted list; § Suspended list; † Temporarily inactive list; Roster updated July 13, 2026; Transactions; → More rosters: MiLB • Texas League; → Kansas City Royals minor league players
