= Arizona Complex League Royals =

- (2003–2013, 2015–present); Surprise, Arizona

Minor league affiliations
- Class: Rookie
- League: Arizona Complex League
- Division: West
- Previous leagues: Arizona League (2003–2013, 2015–2020)

Major league affiliations
- Team: Kansas City Royals

Minor league titles
- League titles (1): 2003
- Division titles (1): 2016 (first-half)

Team data
- Name: ACL Royals Blue & Gold
- Previous names: AZL Royals (2004–2013, 2015–2020); AZL Royals 1 & 2 (2003)
- Ballpark: Surprise Stadium
- Manager: Blue: Omar Ramirez; Gold: Andre David

The Arizona Complex League Royals are a Rookie-level affiliate of the Kansas City Royals, competing in the Arizona Complex League of Minor League Baseball. The team plays its home games at Surprise Stadium in Surprise, Arizona. The team is composed mainly of players who are in their first year of professional baseball either as draftees or non-drafted free agents.

== History ==
The team first competed in the Arizona League (AZL) in 2003, succeeding the Kansas City Royals' Florida-based rookie team, the Gulf Coast League Royals. That season, the team fielded two squads in the league, differentiated by numerical suffixes (1 and 2). The Royals 1 squad won the league championship, defeating the AZL Rangers in the title game.

Starting in 2004, the team fielded a single squad in the league, except for the 2014 season when the team did not compete. The team returned to the league in 2015.

Prior to the 2021 season, the Arizona League was renamed as the Arizona Complex League (ACL). For the 2021 season, the team again fielded two squads, differentiated by color suffixes (Blue and Gold).

== Roster ==
Arizona Complex League Royals roster
Players	Coaches/Other
Pitchers: 75 Andy Basora; 81 Adrian Belen; 65 Sthiven Benitez; -- Grayson Boles; 53 Marwys Cabrera; 38 Brandon Herbold; -- Isaiah Jackson; -- Justin Lamkin; -- Michael Lombardi; 64 Ryan McDonagh; -- Cameron Millar; 79 Jesus Oliveira; -- Coleman Picard; -- Max Poirier; -- Randy Ramnarace; 73 Jhon Reyes; 72 David Rodriguez; 77 Edinson Salgado; -- Ryan Ure; 57 Luis Valdez; -- Shane Van Dam; 35 Gijs Van Den Brink; Catchers: -- Brooks Bryan; 24 Ricson Gonzalez; 29 Jorge Hernandez; 8 Jhosmmel Zue; Infielders: -- Michael Braswell III; 7 Luis Chevalier; 0 Darison Garcia; 12 Manuel German; -- Josh Hammond; -- Tyson Moran; 1 Ivan Sosa; 9 Jhonayker Ugarte; Outfielders: 21 Noah Barber; 27 Roni Cabrera; -- Darnel Collins ‡; -- Corey Cousin; -- Sean Gamble; 17 Daniel Lopez; -- Angel Ramirez	Manager: 33 Larry Sutton; Coaches: -- Jesus Atencio (coach); -- Wilson Betemit (hitting); 60 Jesús Delgado (pitching); -- Rosell Herrera (assistant hitting); 62 Ken Knutson (rehab pitching); -- Christopher Marte (pitching); -- Alan Zinter (hitting); 60-day injured list: 16 Raimel Medina; 7-day injured list; * On Kansas City Royals 40-man roster; ~ Development list; # Rehab assignment; ∞ Reserve list; ‡ Restricted list; § Suspended list; † Temporarily inactive list; Roster updated March 28, 2026; Transactions; → More rosters: MiLB • Arizona Complex League; → Kansas City Royals minor league players
