= List of Milwaukee Brewers first-round draft picks =

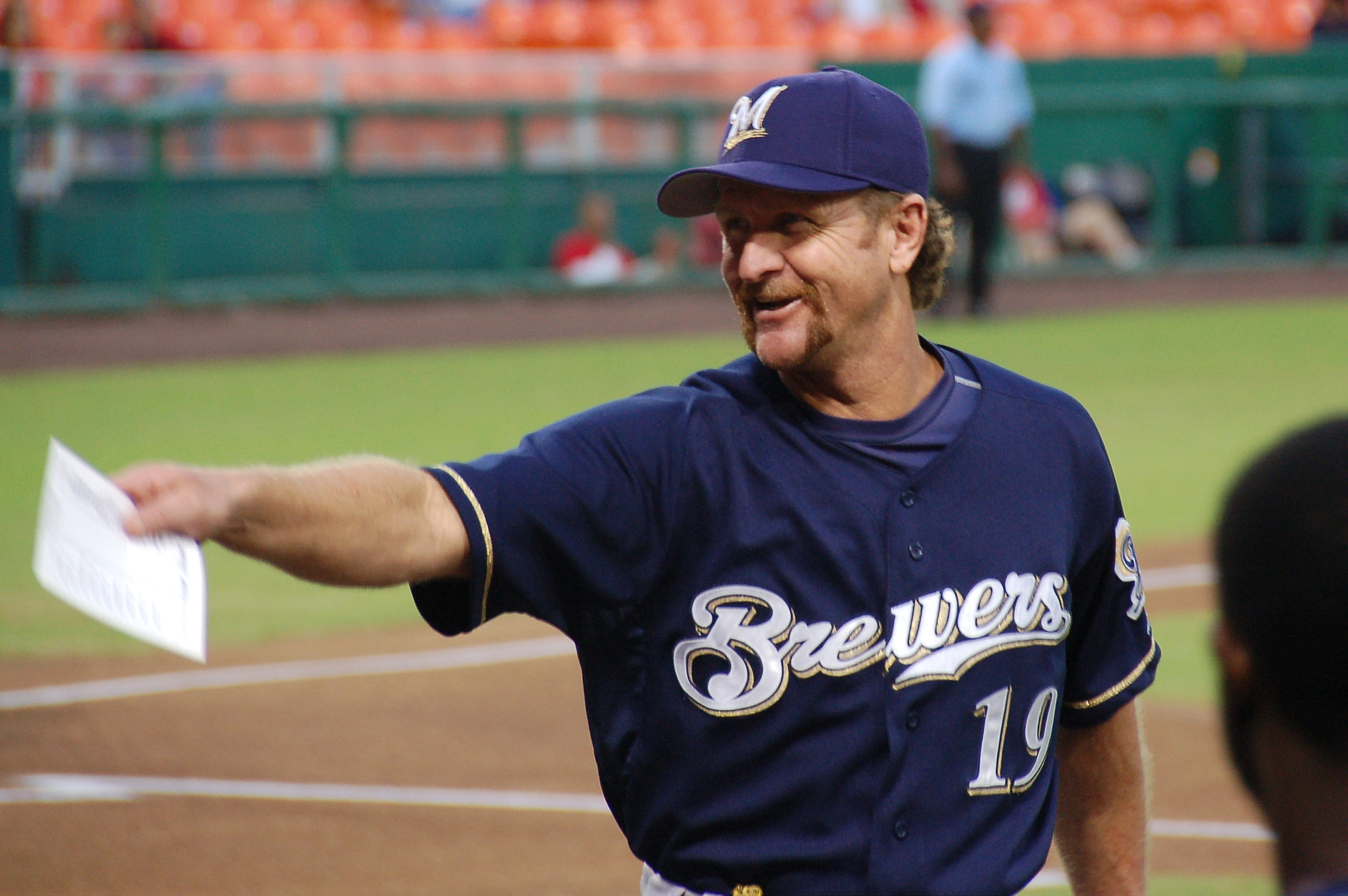
Robin Yount (1973) is one of two Brewers first-round picks to be inducted in the National Baseball Hall of Fame.

The Milwaukee Brewers are a Major League Baseball (MLB) franchise based in Milwaukee, Wisconsin. They play in the National League Central division. Established in Seattle, Washington, as the Seattle Pilots in 1969, the team became the Milwaukee Brewers after relocating to Milwaukee in 1970. The franchise played in the American League until 1998, when it moved to the National League in conjunction with a major league realignment. Since the institution of MLB's Rule 4 draft, the Brewers have selected 74 players in the first round. Officially known as the "First-Year Player Draft", the Rule 4 draft is MLB's primary mechanism for assigning players from high schools, colleges, and other amateur clubs to its franchises. The draft order is determined based on the previous season's standings, with the team possessing the worst record receiving the first pick. In addition, teams which lost free agents in the previous off-season may be awarded compensatory or supplementary picks.

Of the 74 players picked in the first round by Milwaukee, 28 have been pitchers, the most of any position; 18 of these were right-handed, while 10 were left-handed. Fifteen shortstops and outfielders, 6 third basemen, 4 first basemen, 3 catchers, and 3 second basemen were also taken. Seventeen of the players came from high schools or universities in the state of California, and Florida follows with ten players.

Two Brewers first-round picks have been elected to the Baseball Hall of Fame: Robin Yount (1973) was inducted in 1999 and Paul Molitor (1977) in 2004. The Brewers have retired Yount's jersey number 19 and Molitor's jersey number 4. Yount was named the American League Most Valuable Player in 1982 and 1989. Ryan Braun (2005) won the National League Rookie of the Year Award in 2007.

The Brewers have made 19 supplemental selections and have made one first overall selection in the draft. Four of these have been compensatory picks. These additional selections are provided when a team loses a particularly valuable free agent in the prior off-season, (Note: Through the 2012 draft, free agents were evaluated by the Elias Sports Bureau and rated "Type A", "Type B", or not compensation-eligible. If a team offered arbitration to a player but that player refused and subsequently signed with another team, the original team was able to receive additional draft picks. If a "Type A" free agent left in this way, his previous team received a supplemental pick and a compensatory pick from the team with which he signed. If a "Type B" free agent left in this way, his previous team received only a supplemental pick. Since the 2013 draft, free agents are no longer classified by type; instead, compensatory picks are only awarded if the team offered its free agent a contract worth at least the average of the 125 current richest MLB contracts. However, if the free agent's last team acquired the player in a trade during the last year of his contract, it is ineligible to receive compensatory picks for that player.) or, more recently, if a team fails to sign a draft pick from the previous year. They have made six Competitive Balance picks. Since 2013, these selections have been granted to the 10 lowest-revenue clubs and the clubs from the 10 smallest markets and are made between the first and second rounds. The Brewers have failed to sign four of their first-round picks: Bill Bordley (1976), Alex Fernandez (1988), Kenny Henderson (1991), and Dylan Covey (2010).

== Key ==
Year	Each year links to an article about that year's Major League Baseball draft.
Position	Indicates the secondary/collegiate position at which the player was drafted, rather than the professional position the player may have gone on to play
Pick	Indicates the number of the pick
†	Member of the National Baseball Hall of Fame
*	Player did not sign with the Brewers
§	Indicates a supplemental pick

== Picks ==
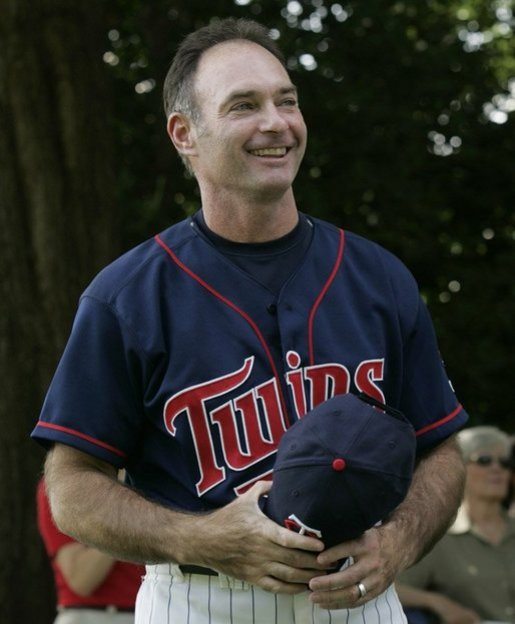
Paul Molitor (1977) is one of two Brewers first-round picks to be elected to the National Baseball Hall of Fame.

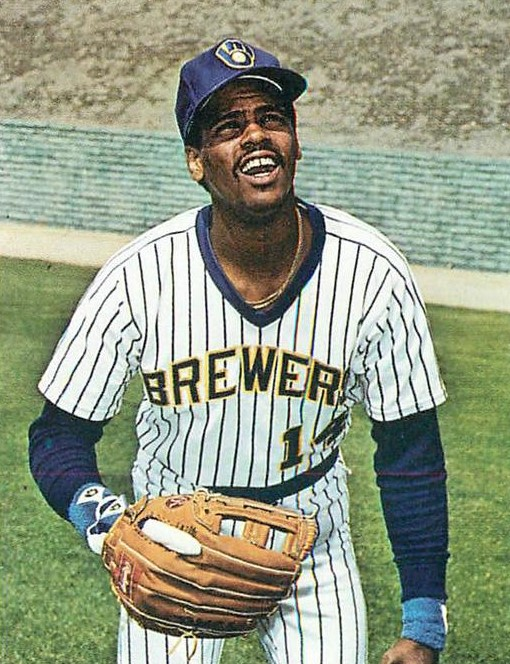
Dion James was the Brewers' first-round pick in 1980.

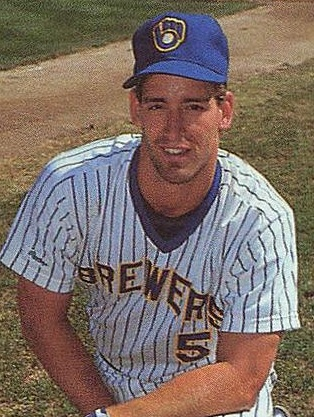
B. J. Surhoff (1985) was the Brewers' first ever first-overall pick.

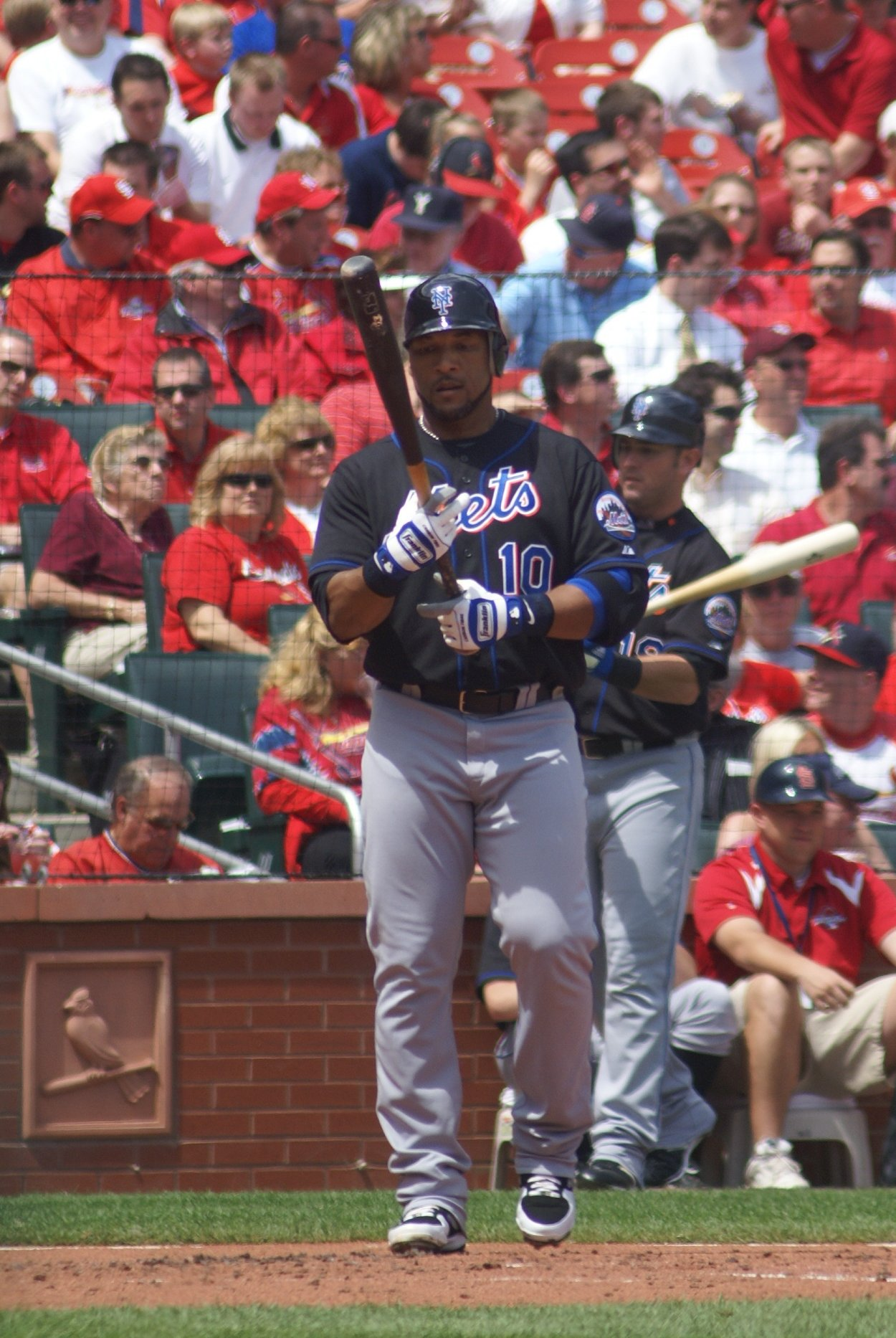
Gary Sheffield (1986) is one of ten Brewers first-round picks to come from high schools or universities in Florida.

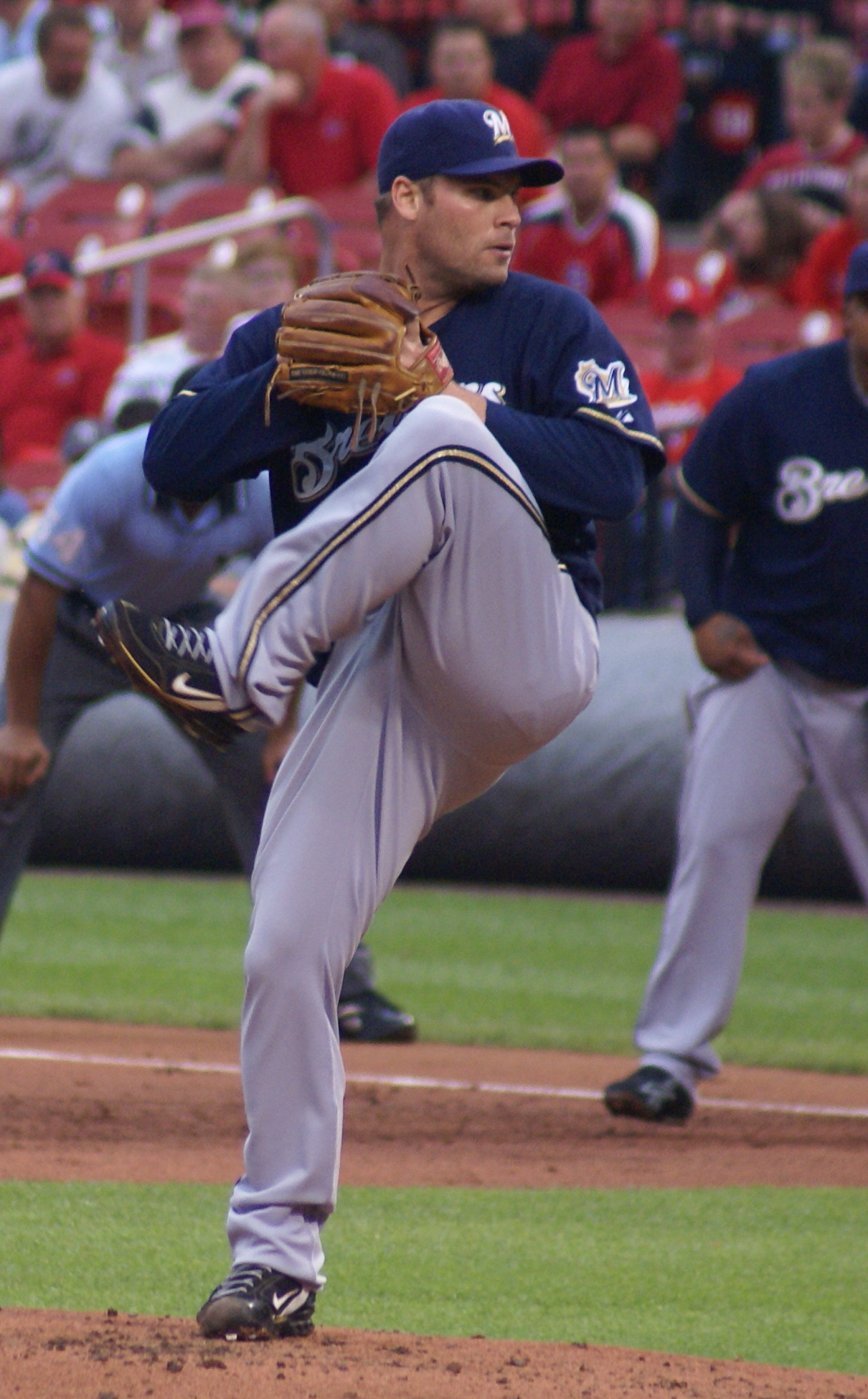
Ben Sheets (1999) is 1 of 17 right-handed pitchers selected by the Brewers in the first round.

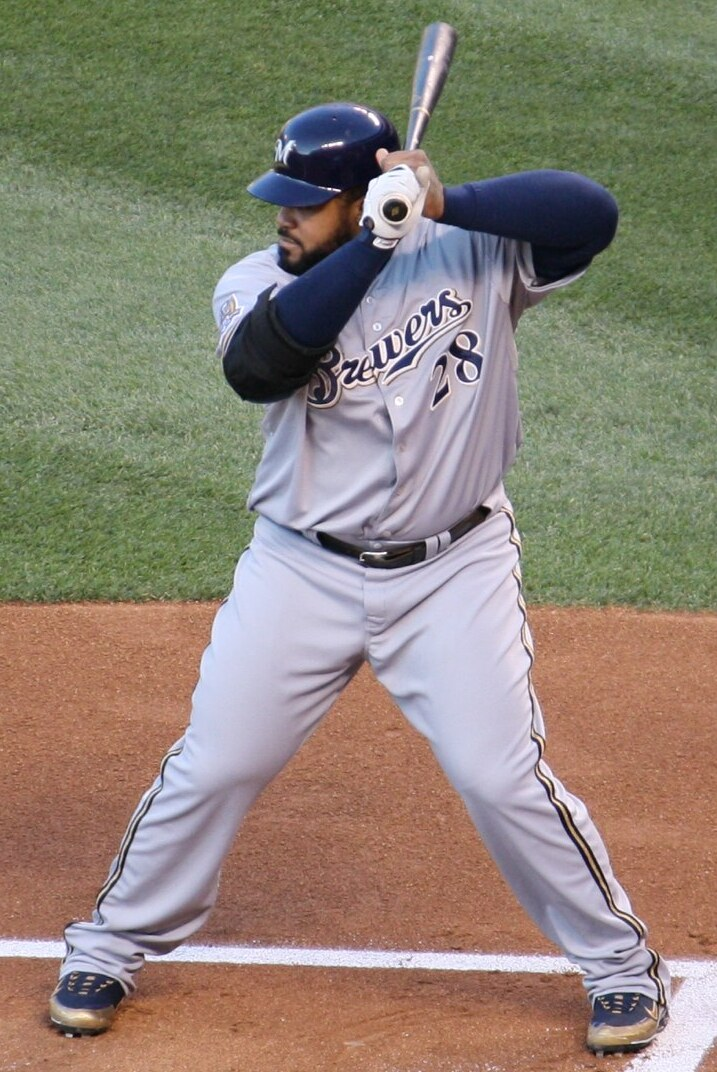
Prince Fielder (2002) led the National League with 50 home runs in 2007.

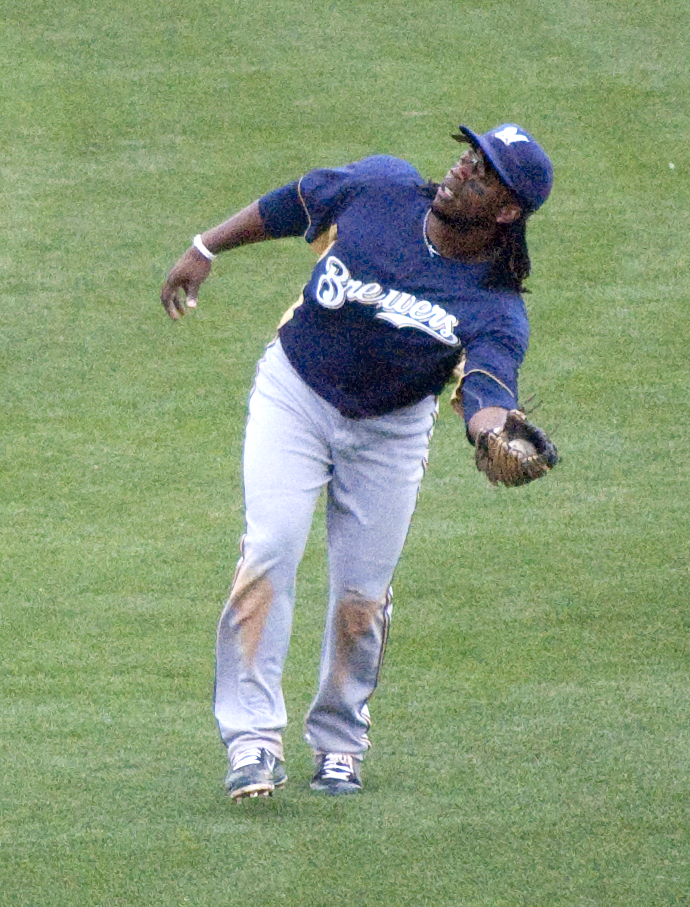
Rickie Weeks (2003) was the first second baseman selected by the Brewers in the first round.

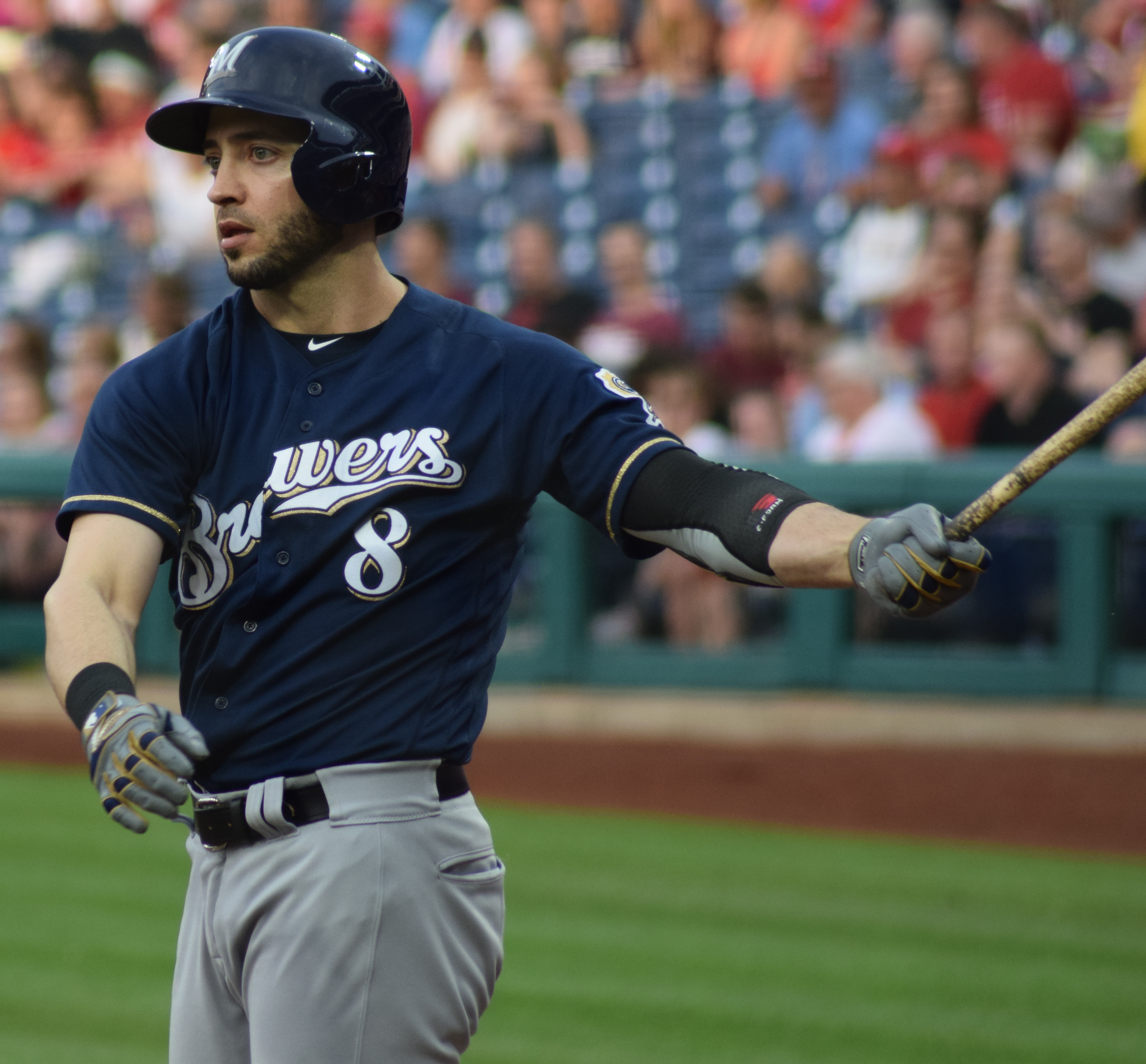
Ryan Braun (2005) is the only Brewers first-round pick to win the Rookie of the Year Award.

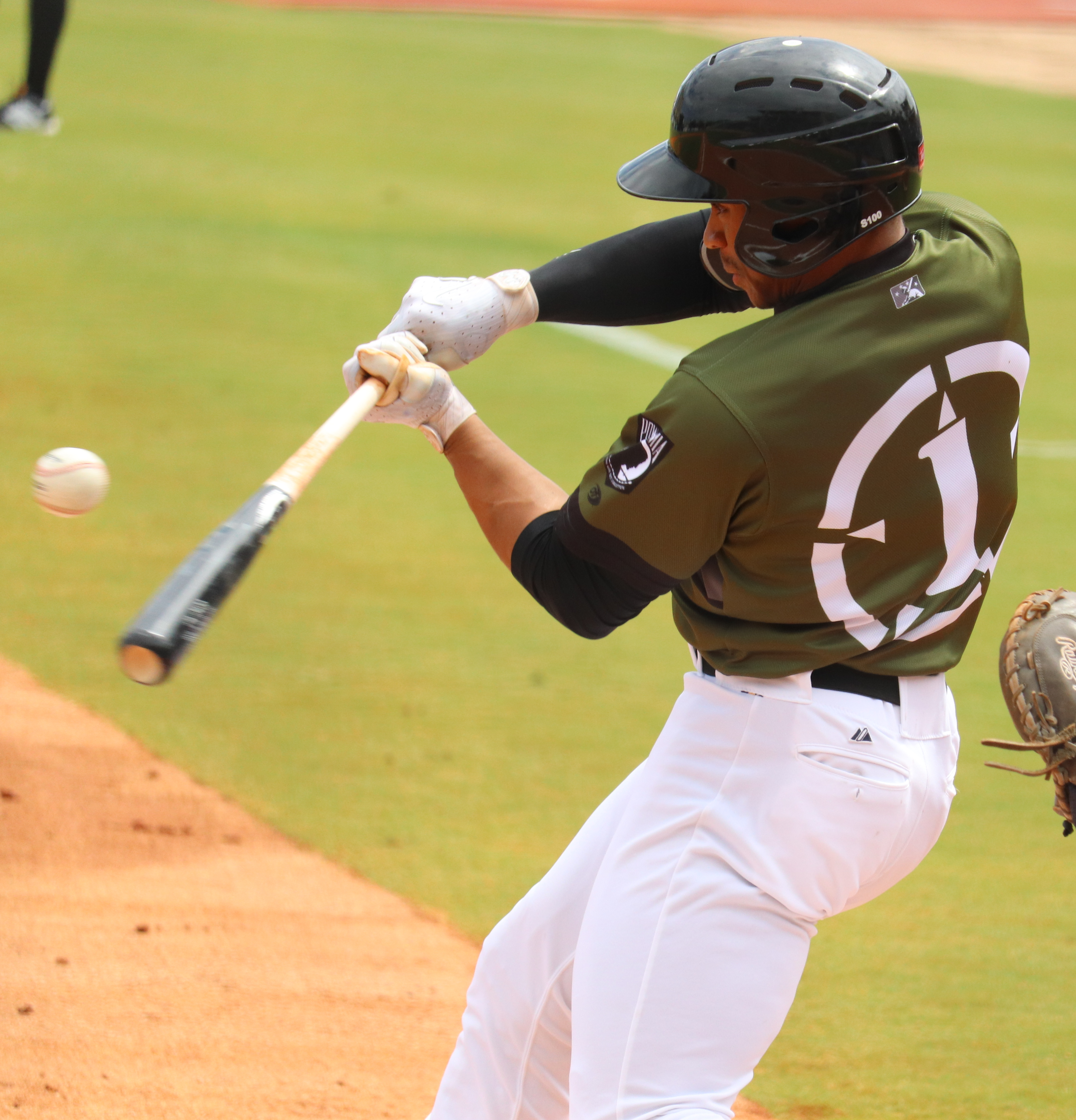
Corey Ray (2016) played only one game in the major leagues.

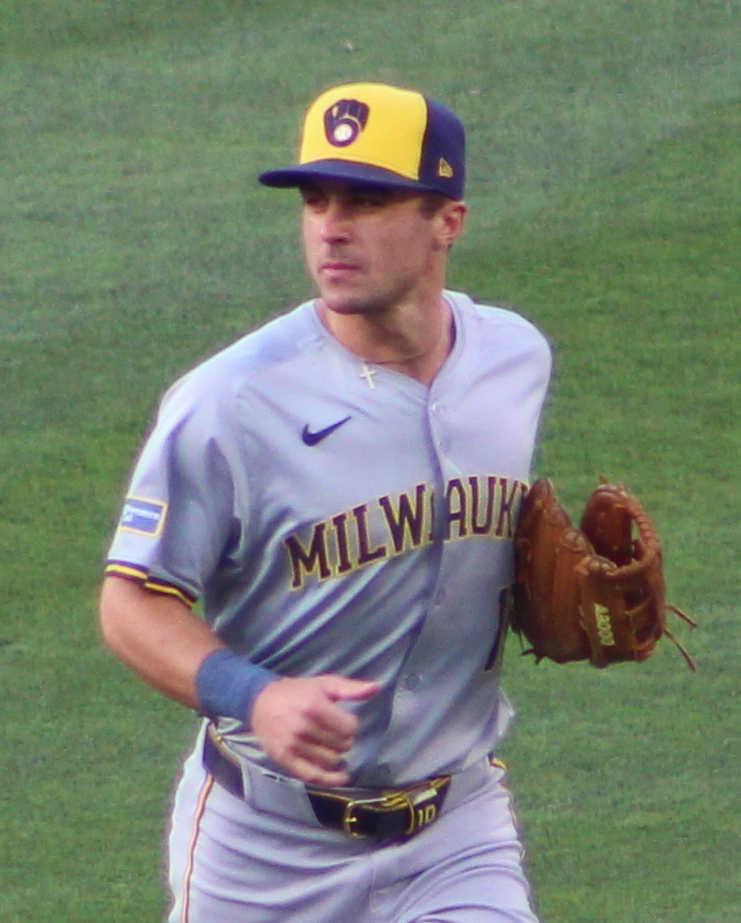
Sal Frelick was the Brewers' first-round pick in 2021.

Year	Name	Position	School (location)	Pick	Ref.
1968	No first-round pick (Note: The Pilots and other expansion teams (Montreal Expos, Kansas City Royals, and San Diego Padres) did not receive first-round picks in 1968. They began the selection process at the end of the fourth round of the regular phase.)				
1969	Gorman Thomas	Shortstop	James Island High School (Charleston, South Carolina)	21	
1970	Darrell Porter	Catcher	Southeast High School (Oklahoma City, Oklahoma)	4	
1971	Tommy Bianco	Shortstop	Sewanhaka High School (Elmont, New York)	3	
1972	Dan Thomas	First baseman	Southern Illinois University Carbondale (Carbondale, Illinois)	6	
1973	Robin Yount^{†}	Shortstop	William Howard Taft High School (Woodland Hills, California)	3	
1974	Butch Edge	Right-handed pitcher	El Camino Fundamental High School (Sacramento, California)	6	
1975	Richard O'Keefe	Left-handed pitcher	Yorktown High School (Yorktown Heights, New York)	5	
1976	Bill Bordley*	Left-handed pitcher	Bishop Montgomery High School (Hermosa Beach, California)	4	
1977	Paul Molitor^{†}	Shortstop	University of Minnesota (Minneapolis, Minnesota)	3	
1978	Nick Hernandez	Catcher	Hialeah High School (Hialeah, Florida)	8	
1979	No first-round pick (Note: The Brewers lost their first-round pick in 1979 to the Detroit Tigers as compensation for signing free agent Jim Slaton.)				
1980	Dion James	Outfielder	C. K. McClatchy High School (Sacramento, California)	25	
1981	No first-round pick (Note: The Brewers lost their first-round pick in 1981 to the Toronto Blue Jays as compensation for signing free agent Roy Howell.)				
1982	Dale Sveum	Shortstop	Pinole Valley High School (Pinole, California)	25	
1983	Dan Plesac	Left-handed pitcher	North Carolina State University (Raleigh, North Carolina)	26	
1984	Isaiah Clark	Shortstop	Crockett High School (Crockett, Texas)	18	
1985	B. J. Surhoff	Shortstop	University of North Carolina at Chapel Hill (Chapel Hill, North Carolina)	1	
1986	Gary Sheffield	Shortstop	Hillsborough High School (Tampa, Florida)	6	
1987	Bill Spiers	Shortstop	Clemson University (Clemson, South Carolina)	13	
1988	Alex Fernandez*	Right-handed pitcher	Monsignor Edward Pace High School (Opa-locka, Florida)	24	
1989	Cal Eldred	Right-handed pitcher	University of Iowa (Iowa City, Iowa)	17	
1989	Gordon Powell	Third baseman	Hughes Center High School (Cincinnati, Ohio)	30^{§} (Note: The Brewers gained a supplemental pick in 1989 for failing to sign 1988 first-round draft pick Alex Fernandez.)	
1990	No first-round pick (Note: The Brewers lost their first-round pick in 1990 to the Oakland Athletics as compensation for signing free agent Dave Parker.)				
1991	Kenny Henderson*	Right-handed pitcher	Ringgold High School (Ringgold, Georgia)	5	
1991	Tyrone Hill	Left-handed pitcher	Yucaipa High School (Yucaipa, California)	15^{§} (Note: The Brewers gained a compensatory first-round pick in 1991 from the Detroit Tigers for losing free agent Rob Deer.)	
1992	Kenny Felder	Outfielder	Florida State University (Tallahassee, Florida)	12	
1992	Gabby Martinez	Shortstop	Luchetti High School (Santurce, Puerto Rico)	38^{§} (Note: The Brewers gained a supplemental pick in 1992 for failing to sign 1991 first-round draft pick Kenny Henderson.)	
1993	Jeff D'Amico	Right-handed pitcher	Northeast High School (St. Petersburg, Florida)	23	
1993	Kelly Wunsch	Left-handed pitcher	Texas A&M University (College Station, Texas)	26^{§} (Note: The Brewers gained a compensatory first-round pick in 1993 from the Toronto Blue Jays for losing free agent Paul Molitor.)	
1993	Todd Dunn	Outfielder	University of North Florida (Jacksonville, Florida)	35^{§} (Note: The Brewers gained a supplemental pick in 1993 for losing free agent Chris Bosio.)	
1993	Joe Wagner	Right-handed pitcher	University of Central Florida (Orlando, Florida)	39^{§} (Note: The Brewers gained a supplemental pick in 1993 for losing free agent Paul Molitor.)	
1994	Anthony Williamson	Third baseman	Arizona State University (Tempe, Arizona)	4	
1995	Geoff Jenkins	Outfielder	University of Southern California (Los Angeles, California)	9	
1996	Chad Green	Outfielder	University of Kentucky (Lexington, Kentucky)	8	
1997	Kyle Peterson	Right-handed pitcher	Stanford University (Stanford, California)	13	
1998	J. M. Gold	Right-handed pitcher	Toms River High School North (Toms River, New Jersey)	13	
1999	Ben Sheets	Right-handed pitcher	Northeast Louisiana University (Monroe, Louisiana)	10	
2000	Dave Krynzel	Outfielder	Green Valley High School (Henderson, Nevada)	11	
2001	Mike Jones	Right-handed pitcher	Thunderbird High School (Phoenix, Arizona)	12	
2002	Prince Fielder	First baseman	Eau Gallie High School (Melbourne, Florida)	7	
2003	Rickie Weeks	Second baseman	Southern University (Baton Rouge, Louisiana)	2	
2004	Mark Rogers	Right-handed pitcher	Mt. Ararat High School (Topsham, Maine)	5	
2005	Ryan Braun	Third baseman	University of Miami (Coral Gables, Florida)	5	
2006	Jeremy Jeffress	Right-handed pitcher	Halifax County High School (South Boston, Virginia)	16	
2007	Matt LaPorta	First baseman	University of Florida (Gainesville, Florida)	7	
2008	Brett Lawrie	Third baseman	Brookswood Secondary School (Langley, British Columbia)	16	
2008	Jake Odorizzi	Right-handed pitcher	Highland High School (New Douglas, Illinois)	32^{§} (Note: The Brewers gained a supplemental pick in 2008 for losing free agent Francisco Cordero.)	
2008	Evan Frederickson	Left-handed pitcher	University of San Francisco (San Francisco, California)	35^{§} (Note: The Brewers gained a supplemental pick in 2008 for losing free agent Scott Linebrink.)	
2009	Eric Arnett	Right-handed pitcher	Indiana University Bloomington (Bloomington, Indiana)	26	
2009	Kentrail Davis	Outfielder	University of Tennessee (Knoxville, Tennessee)	39^{§} (Note: The Brewers gained a supplemental pick in 2009 for losing free agent CC Sabathia.)	
2009	Kyle Heckathorn	Right-handed pitcher	Kennesaw State University (Kennesaw, Georgia)	47^{§} (Note: The Brewers gained a supplemental pick in 2009 for losing free agent Brian Shouse.)	
2010	Dylan Covey*	Right-handed pitcher	Maranatha High School (Pasadena, California)	14	
2011	Taylor Jungmann	Right-handed pitcher	University of Texas at Austin (Austin, Texas)	12	
2011	Jed Bradley	Left-handed pitcher	Georgia Institute of Technology (Atlanta, Georgia)	15^{§} (Note: The Brewers gained a supplemental pick in 2011 for failing to sign 2010 first-round draft pick Dylan Covey.)	
2012	Clint Coulter	Catcher	Union High School (Camas, Washington)	27 (Note: The Brewers gained a compensatory pick in 2012 from the Detroit Tigers for losing free agent Prince Fielder.)	
2012	Victor Roache	Outfielder	Georgia Southern University (Statesboro, Georgia)	28	
2012	Mitch Haniger	Outfielder	California Polytechnic State University (San Luis Obispo, California)	38^{§} (Note: The Brewers gained a supplemental pick in 2012 for losing free agent Prince Fielder.)	
2013	No first-round pick (Note: The Brewers lost their first round pick in 2013 to the St. Louis Cardinals as compensation for signing free agent Kyle Lohse.)				
2014	Kodi Medeiros	Left-handed pitcher	Waiakea High School (Hilo, Hawaii)	12	
2014	Jake Gatewood	Shortstop	Clovis High School (Clovis, California)	41^{§} (Note: Competitive Balance pick)	
2015	Trent Clark	Outfielder	Richland High School (North Richland Hills, Texas)	15	
2015	Nathan Kirby	Left-handed pitcher	University of Virginia (Charlottesville, Virginia)	40^{§} (Note: Competitive Balance pick)	
2016	Corey Ray	Outfielder	University of Louisville (Louisville, Kentucky)	5	
2017	Keston Hiura	Second baseman	UC Irvine (Valencia, California)	9	
2017	Tristen Lutz	Outfielder	Martin High School (Arlington, Texas)	34^{§} (Note: Competitive Balance pick)	
2018	Brice Turang	Shortstop	Santiago High School (Corona, California)	21	
2019	Ethan Small	Left-handed pitcher	Mississippi State University (Starkville, Mississippi)	28	
2020	Garrett Mitchell	Outfielder	University of California, Los Angeles (Los Angeles, California)	20	
2021	Sal Frelick	Outfielder	Boston College (Chestnut Hill, Massachusetts)	15	
2021	Tyler Black	Second baseman	Wright State University (Dayton, Ohio)	33^{§} (Note: Competitive Balance pick)	
2022	Eric Brown	Shortstop	Coastal Carolina University (Conway, South Carolina)	27	
2023	Brock Wilken	Third baseman	Wake Forest University (Wake Forest, North Carolina)	18	
2023	Josh Knoth	Pitcher	Patchogue-Medford High School (Medford, New York)	33^{§} (Note: Competitive Balance pick)	
2024	Braylon Payne	Outfielder	Elkins High School (Missouri City, Texas)	17	
2024	Blake Burke	First baseman	University of Tennessee (Knoxville, Tennessee)	34^{§} (Note: Competitive Balance pick)	
2025	Andrew Fischer	Third baseman	University of Tennessee (Knoxville, Tennessee)	20	
2025	Brady Ebel	Shortstop	Corona High School (Corona, California)	32^{§} (Note: The Brewers gained a compensatory pick in 2025 from the San Francisco Giants for losing free agent Willy Adames.)	
2026	Trey Ebel	Shortstop	Corona High School (Corona, California)	25	

== See also ==
- Milwaukee Brewers minor league players
