= Milwaukee Brewers minor league players =

Below is a partial list of minor league baseball players in the Milwaukee Brewers system.

== Players ==
=== Josh Adamczewski ===
Josh Adamczewski

Milwaukee Brewers
- Second baseman
- Born: May 10, 2005 (age 21); Munster, Indiana, U.S.
- Bats: Left Throws: Right

Joshua Ryan Adamczewski (born May 10, 2005) is an American professional baseball second baseman in the Milwaukee Brewers organization.

Adamczewski attended Lake Central High School in St. John, Indiana. He was selected by the Milwaukee Brewers in the 15th round of the 2023 Major League Baseball draft. He signed with the Brewers and made his professional debut with the Arizona Complex League Brewers.

Adamczewski played 2024 with the ACL Brewers and Carolina Mudcats and Wisconsin Timber Rattlers. He started 2025 with the ACL Brewers rehabbing from injury and was moved up to Carolina after nine games.

- Career statistics from Baseball Reference (Minors)

=== Luke Adams ===
Luke Adams

Milwaukee Brewers
- Third baseman
- Born: April 24, 2004 (age 22); Hinsdale, Illinois, U.S.
- Bats: Right Throws: Right

Jon Luke Adams (born April 24, 2004) is an American professional baseball third baseman in the Milwaukee Brewers organization.

Adams attended Hinsdale Central High School in Hinsdale, Illinois. He was selected by the Milwaukee Brewers in the 12th round of the 2022 Major League Baseball draft. He signed with the Brewers and made his professional debut with the Arizona Complex League Brewers.

Adams played 2023 with the Carolina Mudcats and 2024 with the Wisconsin Timber Rattlers.

- Career statistics from Baseball Reference (Minors)

=== Eric Bitonti ===
Eric Bitonti

Milwaukee Brewers
- Third baseman
- Born: November 17, 2005 (age 21); Hesperia, California, U.S.
- Bats: Left Throws: Right

Eric Eugene Bitonti (born November 17, 2005) is an American professional baseball third baseman in the Milwaukee Brewers organization.

Bitonti attended Aquinas High School in San Bernardino, California. He was selected by the Milwaukee Brewers in the third round of the 2023 Major League Baseball draft.

Bitonti made his professional debut with the Arizona Complex League Brewers. He played 2024 with the ACL Brewers and Carolina Mudcats.

- Career statistics from Baseball Reference (Minors)

=== Mike Boeve ===
Mike Boeve

Milwaukee Brewers
- Third baseman
- Born: May 5, 2002 (age 24); Hastings, Nebraska, U.S.
- Bats: Left Throws: Right

Michael James Boeve (born May 5, 2002) is an American professional baseball third baseman in the Milwaukee Brewers organization.

Boeve attended Hastings High School and played college baseball for the University of Nebraska Omaha Mavericks. In his career, he was named to the all-Summit League team three times, in 2021, 2022, and 2023. Boeve's best season came in 2022 where he had a .393 batting average with a .496 on base percentage, while hitting 21 doubles and eight home runs en route to being named the Summit League Player of the Year. Boeve also had a stellar 2023 season where he batted .401 with a .512 on base percentage while also hitting four home runs with 32 RBI, alongside stealing six bases. In 2022, he played collegiate summer baseball with the Yarmouth–Dennis Red Sox of the Cape Cod Baseball League.

Boeve was selected by the Milwaukee Brewers in the second round with the 54th pick in the 2023 Major League Baseball draft. He signed with the Brewers on July 19, 2023, for $1,250,000.

Boeve made his professional debut after signing with the Rookie-level Arizona Complex League Brewers and also played with the High-A Wisconsin Timber Rattlers, hitting .324 with five home runs and thirty RBIs over 28 games. He opened the 2024 season with Wisconsin and was promoted to the Double–A Biloxi Shuckers in April. Over 79 games between the two teams, he hit .338 with six home runs and 36 RBI. He missed time due to injury a shoulder injury. Boeve returned to Biloxi to open the 2025 season. He was placed on the injured list in April and rehabbed with the ACL Brewers.

- Career statistics from MLB · ESPN · Baseball Reference (Minors)
- Omaha Mavericks bio

=== Marco Dinges ===
Marco Dinges

Milwaukee Brewers
- Catcher
- Born: September 5, 2003 (age 23); Poughkeepsie, New York, U.S.
- Bats: Right Throws: Right

Marco Antonio Dinges (born September 5, 2003) is an American professional baseball catcher in the Milwaukee Brewers organization.

Dinges attended East Lake High School in Tarpon Springs, Florida. He played college baseball at Tallahassee State College and Florida State University. As a freshman at Tallahassee State, he hit .345 with seven home runs, and 40 RBI. During the middle of his freshman season, Dinges dealt with Hemophagocytic Lymphohistiocytosis. As a sophomore at Florida State, Dinges slashed .323/.415/.583 with 15 home runs. He was drafted by the Milwaukee Brewers in the fourth round of the 2024 Major League Baseball draft.

Dinges made his professional debut with the Carolina Mudcats. He began the 2025 season with Carolina and was promoted to the High-A Wisconsin Timber Rattlers in mid-May.

- Career statistics from Baseball Reference (Minors)

=== Brady Ebel ===
Brady Ebel

Milwaukee Brewers
- Shortstop
- Born: July 25, 2007 (age 19); Las Vegas, Nevada, U.S.
- Bats: Left Throws: Right

Brady Alex Ebel (born July 25, 2007) is an American professional baseball shortstop for the Milwaukee Brewers organization.

Ebel attended Etiwanda High School in Rancho Cucamonga, California, for two years before he transferred to Corona High School in Corona, California. In Corona High School, he was teammates with Seth Hernandez and Billy Carlson, who were both selected in the first round of the 2025 MLB draft. He committed to attend Louisiana State University (LSU).

The Milwaukee Brewers selected Ebel with the 32nd overall selection of the 2025 Major League Baseball draft and he signed with the team rather than follow through on the commitment to LSU. Ebel made his professional debut with the Single-A Carolina Mudcats and hit .241 across 16 games. He was assigned to the Single-A Wilson Warbirds to open the 2026 season.

Ebel is the son of Dino Ebel and brother of Trey Ebel.

- Career statistics from Baseball Reference (Minors)

=== Tyson Hardin ===
Tyson Hardin

Milwaukee Brewers
- Pitcher
- Born: November 19, 2001 (age 25); Tampa, Florida, U.S.
- Bats: Right Throws: Right

Tyson Cade Hardin (born November 19, 2001) is an American professional baseball pitcher in Milwaukee Brewers organization.

Hardin attended Strawberry Crest High School in Dover, Florida. He played college baseball at Daytona State College and Mississippi State University as a relief pitcher. He was selected by the Milwaukee Brewers in the 12th round of the 2024 Major League Baseball draft.

The Brewers converted him into a starting pitcher and he made his professional debut with the Carolina Mudcats. He started 2025 with the Wisconsin Timber Rattlers.

- Career statistics from Baseball Reference (Minors)

=== Josh Knoth ===
Josh Knoth

Milwaukee Brewers
- Pitcher
- Born: August 10, 2005 (age 21); Brookhaven, New York, U.S.
- Bats: Right Throws: Right

Joshua Joseph Knoth is an American professional baseball pitcher for the Milwaukee Brewers organization.

Knoth attended Patchogue-Medford High School in Medford, New York. He committed to attend Ole Miss.

The Milwaukee Brewers selected Knoth with the 33rd overall selection of the 2023 Major League Baseball draft. He made his professional debut in 2024 with the Carolina Mudcats. Knoth underwent Tommy John surgery in January 2025 and missed the entire 2025 season.

- Career statistics from Baseball Reference (Minors)

=== Tate Kuehner ===
Tate Kuehner

Milwaukee Brewers
- Pitcher
- Born: February 7, 2001 (age 25); McHenry, Illinois, U.S.
- Bats: Left Throws: Left

Tate Patterson Kuehner (born February 7, 2001) is an American professional baseball pitcher in the Milwaukee Brewers organization.

Kuehner attended Marshalltown High School in Marshalltown, Iowa, and played college baseball at the University of Louisville. In his final collegiate season in 2023, he appeared in 19 games with a 3.99 ERA, 54 strikeouts and five saves. After the season, he was selected by the Milwaukee Brewers in the seventh round of the 2023 Major League Baseball draft. He signed for $72,500.

Kuehner made his professional debut with the Arizona Complex League Brewers, pitching a total of three innings for the season. He opened the 2024 season with the Wisconsin Timber Rattlers. In late July, he was promoted to the Biloxi Shuckers. Over 23 games (19 starts) between the two teams, Kuehner went 8–3 with a 3.19 ERA and 115 strikeouts over 104 1/3 innings. He was assigned to Biloxi to open the 2025 season. In August, he was promoted to the Nashville Sounds. Kuehner made 23 starts for the season and posted a 7–6 record, a 2.77 ERA, and 117 strikeouts over 110 1/3 innings.

Kuehner returned to play with Nashville in 2026. During the season, he was placed on the injured list with left shoulder soreness and missed close to three months. On August 23, Kuehner pitched the last four innings of a no-hitter against the Norfolk Tides as part of a seven-inning doubleheader. Coming on in relief of Brandon Sproat, he struck out four batters to secure the 2–0 Nashville win. Kuehner appeared in 15 games (12 starts) for Nashville in 2026 and had a 2–2 record with a 4.86 ERA and 63 strikeouts over 63 innings. After the season, the Brewers added him to their 40-man roster to protect him from the Rule 5 draft.

- Career statistics from Baseball Reference (Minors)

=== Bishop Letson ===
Bishop Letson

Milwaukee Brewers
- Pitcher
- Born: September 15, 2004 (age 22); Louisville, Kentucky, U.S.
- Bats: Right Throws: Right

Bishop Joel Letson (born September 15, 2004) is an American professional baseball pitcher in the Milwaukee Brewers organization.

Letson attended Floyd Central High School in Floyds Knobs, Indiana. He was selected by the Milwaukee Brewers in the 11th round of the 2023 Major League Baseball draft.

Letson signed with the Brewers and made his first professional debut in 2024 with the Carolina Mudcats. He started 2025 with the Wisconsin Timber Rattlers.

- Career statistics from Baseball Reference (Minors)

=== Dylan O'Rae ===
Dylan O'Rae

Milwaukee Brewers
- Second baseman
- Born: February 14, 2004 (age 22); Sarnia, Ontario, Canada
- Bats: Left Throws: Right

Dylan O'Rae (born February 14, 2004) is a Canadian professional baseball second baseman in the Milwaukee Brewers organization.

O'Rae attended Northern Collegiate Institute and Vocational School in Sarnia, Ontario, Canada. He played for the Canadian Junior National Team in 2022. He committed to play college baseball at the University of Illinois.

O'Rae was selected by the Milwaukee Brewers in the third round of the 2022 Major League Baseball draft. He signed for $575,500. He made his professional debut after signing with the Arizona Complex League Brewers and hit .308 across eight games played. In 2023, O'Rae played with both the Complex League and the Carolina Mudcats and batted .349 with 23 RBI and 44 stolen bases over 60 games. O'Rae was assigned to the Wisconsin Timber Rattlers to begin 2024 and was promoted to the Biloxi Shuckers during the season. Across 126 games played, he hit .217 with one home run, 31 RBI, and 62 stolen bases. He missed the entire 2025 season due to a wrist injury, but did play in the Arizona Fall League with the Surprise Saguaros and was named to the Fall Stars Game. He returned healthy to begin the 2026 season and was assigned to Biloxi. Across 106 games, O'Rae hit .273 with three home runs, 28 RBI, and 63 stolen bases. After the season, the Brewers added him to their 40-man roster to protect him from the Rule 5 draft.

- Career statistics from Baseball Reference (Minors)

=== Braylon Owens ===
Braylon Owens

Milwaukee Brewers
- Pitcher
- Born: December 11, 2002 (age 23); Elgin, Texas
- Bats: Right Throws: Right

Braylon Owens (born December 11, 2002) is an American professional baseball pitcher in the Milwaukee Brewers organization.

Owens attended Elgin High School in Elgin, Texas, where he played baseball and football. He had a 2.04 ERA over ten games as a senior in 2021. Owens played four years of college baseball at the University of Texas at San Antonio for the UTSA Roadrunners. As a senior at UTSA in 2025, he appeared in 21 games and had a 7–2 record, a 4.47 ERA, and 100 strikeouts over 90 2/3 innings. Owens also played collegiate summer baseball with the Victoria Generals of the Texas Collegiate League from 2022 to 2025.

Owens was selected by the Milwaukee Brewers in the 10th round of the 2025 Major League Baseball draft. He made his professional debut in 2026 with the High-A Wisconsin Timber Rattlers and was promoted to the Double-A Biloxi Shuckers during the season. The Brewers named Owens their Minor League Pitcher of the Month for May. Across 21 games (14 starts) between both teams, he went 4–1 with a 4.04 ERA and 118 strikeouts across 93 2/3 innings.

- Career statistics from Baseball Reference (Minors)
- UTSA Roadrunnerss bio

=== Luis Peña ===
Luis Peña

Milwaukee Brewers
- Shortstop
- Born: November 13, 2006 (age 20); El Limón, Dominican Republic
- Bats: Right Throws: Right

Luis Mario Peña (born November 13, 2006) is a Dominican professional baseball shortstop in the Milwaukee Brewers organization.

Peña signed with the Milwaukee Brewers as an international free agent in January 2024. He made his professional debut that season with the Dominican Summer League Brewers, hitting .393/.457/.583 with one home run, 36 runs batted in (RBI) and 39 stolen bases over 44 games. Peña started the 2025 season with the Carolina Mudcats and finished with the Wisconsin Timber Rattlers.

Peña returned to the Midwest League in 2026, playing 51 games with the Timber Rattlers before a late-season promotion to Double–A with the Biloxi Shuckers of the Southern League. He made 16 appearances for Biloxi, batting .268/.328/.339 with one home run, three RBI, and six stolen bases. On September 25, 2026, Peña underwent surgery for a fractured left fibula, ending his season.

- Career statistics from Baseball Reference (Minors)

=== Cole Phillips ===
Cole Phillips

Milwaukee Brewers
- Pitcher
- Born: May 26, 2003 (age 23); San Diego, California, U.S.
- Bats: Right Throws: Right

Cole William Phillips (born May 26, 2003) is an American professional baseball pitcher for the Milwaukee Brewers organization.

Phillips attended Boerne High School in Boerne, Texas. In his senior season in 2022, his fastball velocity increased to 98 miles per hour. However, he had Tommy John surgery in April. Despite his injury, the Atlanta Braves selected Phillips in the second round of the 2022 MLB draft. He received a $1.5 million signing bonus. He did not throw a pitch in a game while in the Braves organization.

On December 3, 2023, the Braves traded Phillips and Jackson Kowar to the Seattle Mariners for Jarred Kelenic, Marco Gonzales, and Evan White. However, prior to the 2024 season, Phillips underwent a second Tommy John surgery, again keeping him from pitching competitively.

On December 10, 2025, Phillips was selected in the Rule 5 draft by the Milwaukee Brewers.

- Career statistics from Baseball Reference (Minors)

=== Jack Seppings ===
Jack Seppings

Milwaukee Brewers
- Pitcher
- Born: July 3, 2002 (age 24); Stillwater, Minnesota, U.S.
- Bats: Right Throws: Right

Jack Stanley Seppings (born July 3, 2002) is an American professional baseball pitcher in the Milwaukee Brewers organization.

Seppings played college baseball for Brown from 2022 to 2024. In 2024, he played collegiate summer baseball with the Falmouth Commodores of the Cape Cod Baseball League.

On July 31, 2024, Seppings signed with the Milwaukee Brewers as an undrafted free agent.

Seppings represented the Great Britain national team at the 2026 World Baseball Classic.

Seppings's father was born in England, and he holds dual American and British citizenship.

- Career statistics from Baseball Reference (Minors)

=== J.D. Thompson ===
J.D. Thompson

Milwaukee Brewers
- Pitcher
- Born: September 28, 2003 (age 23); Tyler, Texas
- Bats: Right Throws: Left

James Douglas Thompson (born September 28, 2003) is an American professional baseball pitcher in the Milwaukee Brewers organization.

Thompson attended Rusk High School in Rusk, Texas. As a senior in 2022, he went 6–0 with a 0.27 ERA, and 93 strikeouts. Thompson played three years of college baseball at Vanderbilt University. In 2024, he played collegiate summer baseball in the Cape Cod Baseball League with the Bourne Braves. As a junior at Vanderbilt in 2025, Thompson started 16 games and pitched to a 6–5 record, a 4.00 ERA, and 122 strikeouts over 90 innings.

Thompson was selected by the Milwaukee Brewers in the second round with the 59th overall pick in the 2025 Major League Baseball draft. He signed with the Brewers for a $1.6 million signing bonus. Thompson made his professional debut in 2026 with the High-A Wisconsin Timber Rattlers and was promoted to the Double-A Biloxi Shuckers during the season. He also made two rehab appearances with the Rookie-level Arizona Complex League Brewers. Across 17 starts between the three teams, Thompson had a 1–5 record, a 3.98 ERA, and 80 strikeouts across 61 innings.

- Career statistics from Baseball Reference (Minors)

=== Cameron Wagoner ===
Cameron Wagoner

Milwaukee Brewers
- Pitcher
- Born: June 21, 2001 (age 25); Ypsilanti, Michigan, U.S.
- Bats: Right Throws: Right

Cameron Richard Wagoner (born June 21, 2001) is an American professional baseball pitcher in Milwaukee Brewers organization.

Wagoner attended Tecumseh High School in Tecumseh, Michigan. He was selected by the Texas Rangers in the 22nd round of the 2019 Major League Baseball draft, but did not sign and played college baseball at Eastern Michigan University.

After three years at Eastern Michigan, Wagoner was selected by the Milwaukee Brewers in the 11th round of the 2022 Major League Baseball draft. He spent his first professional season with the Arizona Complex League Brewers and Carolina Mudcats. After the season, he played in the Australian Baseball League for the Brisbane Bandits. He pitched 2023 with the Wisconsin Timber Rattlers.

Wagoner missed the 2024 and 2025 season after undergoing Tommy John Surgery. He returned from the injury in 2026 and started the season with the Biloxi Shuckers before being promoted to the Nashville Sounds.

- Career statistics from Baseball Reference (Minors)

=== Brett Wichrowski ===
Brett Wichrowski

Milwaukee Brewers
- Pitcher
- Born: August 15, 2002 (age 24); Voorhees, New Jersey, U.S.
- Bats: Left Throws: Right

Brett Francis Wichrowski (born August 15, 2002) is an American professional baseball pitcher in the Milwaukee Brewers organization.

Wichrowski attended Williamstown High School in Williamstown, New Jersey and played college baseball at Bryant University. In 2021, he played collegiate summer baseball with the Orleans Firebirds of the Cape Cod Baseball League, and returned to the league in 2023 with the Wareham Gatemen. He was selected by the Milwaukee Brewers in the 13th round of the 2023 Major League Baseball draft.

Wichrowski signed with the Brewers and made his professional debut in 2024 with the Wisconsin Timber Rattlers was promoted to the Biloxi Shuckers after four starts.

- Career statistics from MLB · ESPN · Baseball Reference (Minors)
- Bryant Bulldogs bio

=== Matt Wood ===
Matt Wood

Milwaukee Brewers
- Catcher
- Born: March 2, 2001 (age 25); Naperville, Illinois, U.S.
- Bats: Left Throws: Right

Matthew George Wood (born March 2, 2001) is an American professional baseball catcher in the Milwaukee Brewers organization.

Wood attended Pine-Richland High School in Gibsonia, Pennsylvania and played college baseball at Penn State. He was selected by the Milwaukee Brewers in the fourth round of the 2022 Major League Baseball draft.

The Brewers added Wood to their 40-man roster after the 2026 season.

- Career statistics from Baseball Reference (Minors)

== Full Triple-A to Rookie League rosters ==
=== Triple-A ===
Nashville Sounds roster
Players		Coaches/Other
Pitchers: 15 Kaleb Bowman; -- Will Childers; -- Stiven Cruz; 34 Tyson Hardin; 49 Edwin Jiminez; 47 Jared Koenig; -- Ben Moore; 40 Carlos Rodríguez; 38 Brett Wichrowski	Catchers Infielders: 45 Blake Burke; 5 Daniel Guilarte; 1 Ethan Murray; 10 Jonathan Ornelas; 25 Brock Wilken; Outfielders: 29 Eric Brown Jr.	Manager: 16 Rick Sweet; Coaches: 59 Eric Bunnell; -- Tim Doherty (hitting); -- Zachary Jones (hitting); -- Bryan Leslie (pitching); -- Tyler Thornburg (pitching); 24 David Tufo (bench); 7-day injured list; * On Milwaukee Brewers 40-man roster; ~ Development list; # Rehab assignment; ∞ Reserve list; ‡ Restricted list; § Suspended list; † Temporarily inactive list; Roster updated November 20, 2026; Transactions; → More rosters: MiLB • International League; → Milwaukee Brewers minor league players

=== Double-A ===
Biloxi Shuckers roster
Players		Coaches/Other
Pitchers: 53 Ryan Birchard; 16 Jesús Broca; 66 Tyler Bryant; -- Chase Costello; 30 Jaron DeBerry; 17 Anthony Flores; 21 Yorman Galindez; 22 Sam Garcia; -- Tanner Gillis; 36 Garrett Hodges; 22 Josh Knoth; 31 Bishop Letson; 54 Nick Merkel; 27 Peyton Niksch; 38 Braylon Owens; 20 Joshua Quezada; 28 Manuel Rodriguez; 19 Jack Seppings; 26 Travis Smith; 15 J.D. Thompson; 33 Wande Torres	Catchers Infielders: 39 Eric Bitonti; 9 Daniel Dickinson; 25 Andrew Fischer; 12 Jesús Made; 1 Luis Peña; -- Jheremy Vargas; Outfielders: 6 Josh Adamczewski; 3 Mike Boeve; 18 Mark Coley II; 5 Damon Keith; 2 Braylon Payne; Designated hitters: 1 Marco Dinges	Manager: 13 Mike Guerrero; Coaches: 8 Matt Lipka; 7 Kevin Martir (hitting); 37 Josh Spence (pitching); 23 Tyson Cooper (associate); 7-day injured list; * On Milwaukee Brewers 40-man roster; ~ Development list; # Rehab assignment; ∞ Reserve list; ‡ Restricted list; § Suspended list; † Temporarily inactive list; Roster updated November 20, 2026; Transactions; → More rosters: MiLB • Southern League; → Milwaukee Brewers minor league players

=== High-A ===
Wisconsin Timber Rattlers roster
Players		Coaches/Other
Pitchers: 33 Jarrette Bonet; 10 Thomas Conrad; 18 Daniel Corniel; 35 Ethan Dorchies; 19 Jayden Dubanewicz; -- Jesus Flores; 27 Michael Fowler; 20 Andrew Healy; 31 Bjorn Johnson; 32 Quinton Low; -- Bryce Meccage; 29 Jose Meneses; 37 Miqueas Mercedes; 34 Jacob Morrison; 28 Tanner Perry; -- Bryan Rivera; -- Will Rudy; 23 Chandler Welch; -- Jason Woodward	Catchers: 5 Edgardo Ordonez; 17 Yannic Walther; Infielders: 1 Luiyin Alastre; 2 Juan Baez; 14 Brady Ebel; 22 Tayden Hall; 6 Juan Ortuno; Outfielders: 16 Luis Castillo; 4 Tyler Rodriguez; 12 Sawyer Strosnider	Manager: 7 Nick Stanley; Coaches: -- Evan Berliner (hitting); -- Patrick McGuff (pitching); 8 Liu Rodríguez (coach); 7-day injured list; * On Milwaukee Brewers 40-man roster; ~ Development list; # Rehab assignment; ∞ Reserve list; ‡ Restricted list; § Suspended list; † Temporarily inactive list; Roster updated November 2, 2026; Transactions; → More rosters: MiLB • Midwest League; → Milwaukee Brewers minor league players

=== Single-A ===
Wilson Warbirds roster
Players		Coaches/Other
Pitchers: 35 Joey Broughton; 17 Frank Cairone; 18 Carlos Carra; 30 Enniel Cortez; 23 Cesar Espinal; 43 Andrew Gaines; 30 Ma'Kale Holden; -- Jack Hostetler; 16 Dariel Jaquez; 10 Wenderlyn King; 28 Diustin Mayorquin; 25 Enderson Mercado; 29 Joan Pena; 19 Eric Prado; 14 Tyler Renz; -- Anfernny Reyes; 21 Hayden Robinson; 38 Luke Roupe; -- Griffin Tobias; 31 Ismael Yanez	Catchers: 34 Kevin Garcia; 9 Eric Martinez; 7 Rylan Mills; Infielders: 4 Filippo Di Turi; 22 Trey Ebel; 11 Frederi Montero; 12 Moises Polanco; 44 Carsten Sabathia III; Outfielders: 15 José Anderson; 5 Brailyn Antunez; 20 Handelfry Encarnacion; 2 Pedro Ibarguen; 3 Kyle Jones	Manager: 27 Eddy Morgan; Coaches: 46 Ricky Carvajal (coach); 37 José García (hitting); 40 Jesús Hernández (pitching); 50 Paul Moeller (pitching); 7-day injured list; * On Milwaukee Brewers 40-man roster; ~ Development list; # Rehab assignment; ∞ Reserve list; ‡ Restricted list; § Suspended list; † Temporarily inactive list; Roster updated November 2, 2026; Transactions; → More rosters: MiLB • Carolina League; → Milwaukee Brewers minor league players

=== Rookie ===
Arizona Complex League Brewers roster
Players		Coaches/Other
Pitchers: 49 Chase Bentley; -- Sean Episcope; -- Joshua Flores; -- Julian Garcia; -- Sam George; -- Grant Hill; -- Marcus Kruzan; -- Keaton Maiorana; -- Chase Mora; -- Ryan Oshinskie; -- Cole Phillips; -- Johandry Ramirez; 47 Bryan Regalado; -- Brady Smith; -- Chang Tzu-Chun Lin; 46 Hayden Vucinovich	Catchers: 27 Luis Corobo; -- Kendall Hagedorn; 13 Freider Rojas; Infielders: 68 Cristopher Acosta; 5 CJ Hughes; -- Luis Lameda; 23 Yu-Lin Liao; 35 Jonathan Rangel; 6 Leonard Rijo; -- Chance Ruby; -- Kellan Tom; Outfielders: 22 Kenny Fenelon; 3 Malachai Halterman; -- Carson Hart; 37 Gerlyn Payano	Manager: 12 Rafael Neda; Coaches: 43 Jairo Cueves (pitching); 53 Luisa Gauci (hitting); 31 Dillon Leveille (coach); 48 Jared Matheson (coach); 2 Fidel Pena (bench); 7-day injured list; * On Milwaukee Brewers 40-man roster; ~ Development list; # Rehab assignment; ∞ Reserve list; ‡ Restricted list; § Suspended list; † Temporarily inactive list; Roster updated November 2, 2026; Transactions; → More rosters: MiLB • Arizona Complex League; → Milwaukee Brewers minor league players

=== Foreign Rookie ===
Dominican Summer League Brewers Blue roster
Players		Coaches/Other
Pitchers: 59 Brailin Aguirrez; 72 Fausto Barreras; 58 Jordy Brache; 57 Alejandro Bustamante; 40 Manuel Davila; 55 Wilmer Duarte; 54 Steven Duran; -- Jefrey Etiene; 53 Carlos Galindo; 51 Deivy Gonzalez; 52 Lukas Gonzalez; 49 Alexander Mercedes; 47 Daniel Munoz; -- Orlando Nuguero; 46 Jean Rodriguez; 45 Jesus Vasquez; 39 Yancarlos Vasquez	Catchers: 16 Sebastian Franeites; 18 Yoneiker Lugo; 20 Roniel Paulino; 21 Johanderson Tarazona; Infielders: 2 Diego Frontado; 9 Cristian Montilla; 6 José Rodríguez; Outfielders: 12 Manny De Los Santos; 11 Angel Gonzalez; -- Josue Jean; 13 Enrique Lovera; 5 Jesus Mancera	Manager: -- Victor Rey; Coaches: -- Jacob Banister (coach); -- Conor Baxter (hitting); -- Carlos Pimentel (pitching); -- Ludwin Tejada (bullpen); 7-day injured list; * On Milwaukee Brewers 40-man roster; ~ Development list; # Rehab assignment; ∞ Reserve list; ‡ Restricted list; § Suspended list; † Temporarily inactive list; Roster updated November 4, 2026; Transactions; → More rosters: MiLB • Dominican Summer League; → Milwaukee Brewers minor league players

→

Dominican Summer League Brewers Gold roster
Players		Coaches/Other
Pitchers: 54 Luis Aguayo; 60 Miguel Andrade; 59 Jose Arias; 57 Adrian Bello; 56 Dalvin Bodre; 55 Wandy Cabrera; 40 Noel Cepeda; 53 Daniel Garcia; 52 Derlin Garcia; 51 Gustavo Garcia; 50 Joan Gonzalez; 49 Paul Hoff; 32 Justin Lugo; 48 Santiago Martinez; 38 Manuel Moreno; 46 Jean Rivero; 36 Ruben Saldana; 45 Raymond Sarmiento; -- Diego Trillo; 41 Marcos Veras	Catchers: 18 Francisco De Marchena; 20 Moises Salazar; Infielders: 12 Angeni Fernandez; 7 Santiago Garcia; 9 Leanders Matos; 2 Ricki Moneys; 6 Matthew Moses; 5 Osiris Ramirez; 14 Ruben Revost; 3 Josue Rodriguez; Outfielders: 11 Carlos Done; 10 Frandy Lafond; 14 Jefer Lista; -- Heeju Shin; 16 Francis Sosa	Manager: -- Natanael Mejia; Coaches: -- Joan Abreu (hitting); -- Robinzon Díaz (catching); -- Gerry Salisbury (pitching); 7-day injured list; * On Milwaukee Brewers 40-man roster; ~ Development list; # Rehab assignment; ∞ Reserve list; ‡ Restricted list; § Suspended list; † Temporarily inactive list; Roster updated November 2, 2026; Transactions; → More rosters: MiLB • Dominican Summer League; → Milwaukee Brewers minor league players
