= Seth Hernandez =

American baseball player (born 2006)

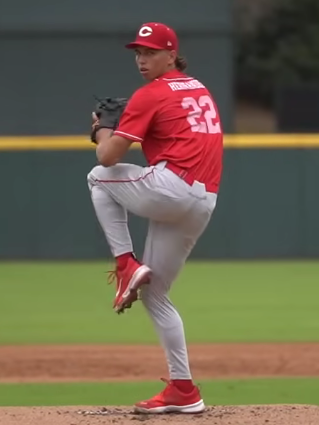
- Hernandez with Corona High School in 2024

Pittsburgh Pirates
- Pitcher
- Born: June 28, 2006 (age 20); Pomona, California, U.S.
- Bats: Right Throws: Right
- Stats at Baseball Reference

Seth Ryan Hernandez (born June 28, 2006) is an American professional baseball pitcher in the Pittsburgh Pirates organization. He was selected by the Pirates with the sixth overall pick in the 2025 MLB draft.

== Amateur career ==
Hernandez was homeschooled his freshman and sophomore years of high school. He started attending Corona High School in Corona, California his junior year. As a junior in 2024, Hernandez went 9–0 with a 0.62 earned run average (ERA) and 73 strikeouts as a pitcher and hit .352 with eight home runs and 34 runs batted in (RBI). He was named the California Gatorade Baseball Player of the Year and was also named the Los Angeles Times Player of the Year and The Press-Enterprise Varsity Player of the Year. Hernandez entered his senior year in 2025 as a top prospect for the upcoming draft. As a senior, he posted a 0.39 ERA and 105 strikeouts and was named the Gatorade National Baseball Player of the Year. At Corona, he was teammates with Billy Carlson and Brady Ebel. Hernandez committed to play college baseball at Vanderbilt University.

== Professional career ==
Hernandez was selected with the sixth overall pick in the 2025 Major League Baseball draft by the Pittsburgh Pirates. He signed with Pittsburgh for a $7.25 million bonus on July 26, setting a record for the highest bonus ever given to a high school pitcher.

Hernandez made his professional debut in 2026 with the Single-A Bradenton Marauders. He had a 0.96 ERA with 50 strikeouts across 28 innings with Bradenton. In May, Hernandez was promoted to the High-A Greensboro Grasshoppers. He was placed on the injured list in July with a left oblique strain.
