= Dino Ebel =

American baseball coach (born 1966)

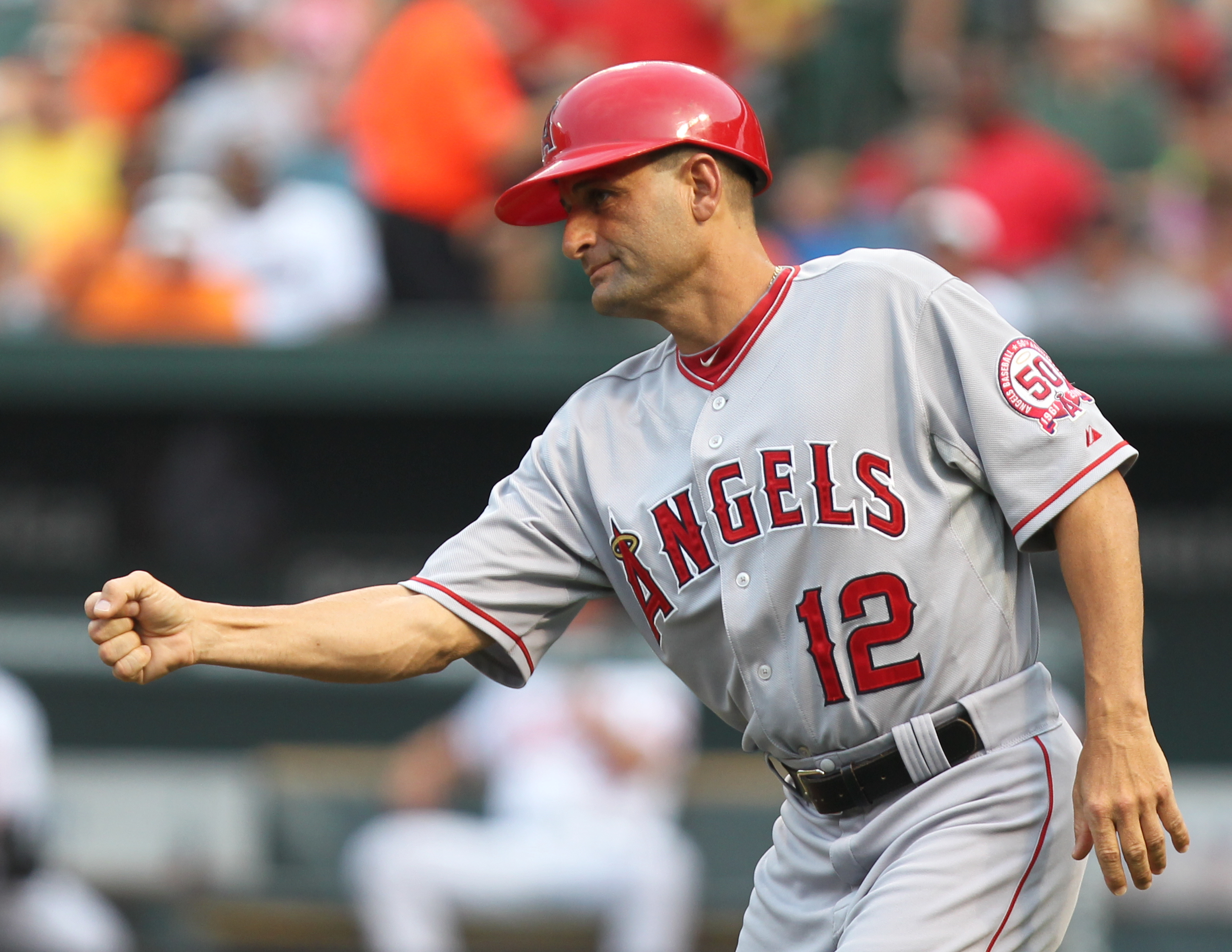
- Ebel as third base coach for the Los Angeles Angels in 2011

Los Angeles Dodgers – No. 91
- Third base coach
- Born: March 20, 1966 (age 60); Barstow, California, U.S.
- Bats: Right Throws: Right
- Stats at Baseball Reference

Teams
- As coach: Los Angeles Angels of Anaheim / Los Angeles Angels (2006–2018); Los Angeles Dodgers (2019–present)

Career highlights and awards
- 3× World Series champion (2020, 2024, 2025)

Dino Alex Ebel (born March 20, 1966) is an American former professional baseball player and current coach. He is currently the third base coach for the Los Angeles Dodgers of Major League Baseball (MLB). He previously served as the baseball manager for various teams in the Los Angeles Angels system for 9 years.

== Playing career ==
=== Amateur career ===
Ebel attended San Bernardino Valley College. He was drafted in the 27th round (365th overall) of the 1986 amateur draft by the Philadelphia Phillies, but elected to attend Florida Southern College, where he was a member of the 1988 NCAA Division II championship squad.

=== Professional career ===
==== Minor leagues ====
Ebel signed with the Los Angeles Dodgers organization as a free agent, and was named the Rookie-level Gulf Coast League (GCL) Player of the Year in his 1988 season with the rookie-level GCL Dodgers. He was promoted to the Vero Beach Dodgers of the Class A-Advanced Florida State League (FSL) in 1989, and was a member of the 1990 FSL champions. In 1991, Ebel was promoted to the Albuquerque Dukes of the Class AAA Pacific Coast League (PCL), where he served as a utility player. During the 1989, 1990 and 1991 off seasons, Ebel also played in the Australian Baseball League with the Dodgers Australian affiliate the Adelaide Giants.

In 1991 he served as a player–coach for the Bakersfield Dodgers of the Class A-Advanced California League, a position he held until 1994. He served as a player–coach for the high-A San Bernardino Spirit, also of the California League, in 1995, before coaching full-time with the San Antonio Missions of the Class AA Texas League in 1996. He began his managing career in 1997 with San Bernardino, taking the reins of the club late in the season. He managed the Great Falls Dodgers of the Rookie-level Pioneer League in 1998, compiling a 40–35 record. In 1999, he managed the Yakima Bears of the Class A-Short Season Northwest League. He returned to San Bernardino in 2000, and led the club to the California League title. He moved to the Wilmington Waves of the Class A South Atlantic League the following year, where he posted a 75–63 record. In 2002, he led the Jacksonville Suns to the Class AA Southern League East Division Championship and served as the club's manager until 2004.

== Coaching career ==
=== Los Angeles Angels of Anaheim / Los Angeles Angels ===
After serving for seventeen years in the Dodgers organization, Ebel joined the Los Angeles Angels organization in 2005 as the coach of the Salt Lake Stingers of the PCL, which posted a 79–65 record under his guidance. After long-time bench coach Joe Maddon left the Angels organization to manage the Tampa Bay Rays, Ebel was appointed to the major league team's coaching staff as Mike Scioscia's third base coach. While Ebel was the third base coach, Scioscia and he advocated a more aggressive style of baserunning.

On October 8, 2013, Ebel succeeded Rob Picciolo, who was fired by the Angels, as the bench coach in 2014. Ebel is known for his loud whistle, which he uses to relay defensive alignments, such as shifts, during games.

Ebel has compiled a career managing record of 531–496 in eight seasons.

For the 2018 season, Ebel returned to the third base coach role after Ron Roenicke was hired as the bench coach for the Boston Red Sox and Josh Paul was named the Angels bench coach.

=== Los Angeles Dodgers ===
On November 28, 2018, he was named to be the new third base coach for the Los Angeles Dodgers.

=== World Baseball Classic Team USA ===
Dino has been named the Team USA World Baseball Classic third base coach two times, one time in 2023 and most recently for the 2026 WBC.

== Personal life ==
Ebel's sons, Brady, and Trey were both drafted by the Milwaukee Brewers.

Sporting positions
Preceded by Ron Roenicke; Ron Roenicke	Los Angeles Angels third base coach 2006–2013; 2018	Succeeded by Gary DiSarcina; Mike Gallego
Preceded by Rob Picciolo	Los Angeles Angels bench coach 2014–2017	Succeeded by Josh Paul
Preceded by Chris Woodward	Los Angeles Dodgers third base coach 2019–present	Succeeded by Incumbent
