= Rob Picciolo =

American baseball player (1953–2018)

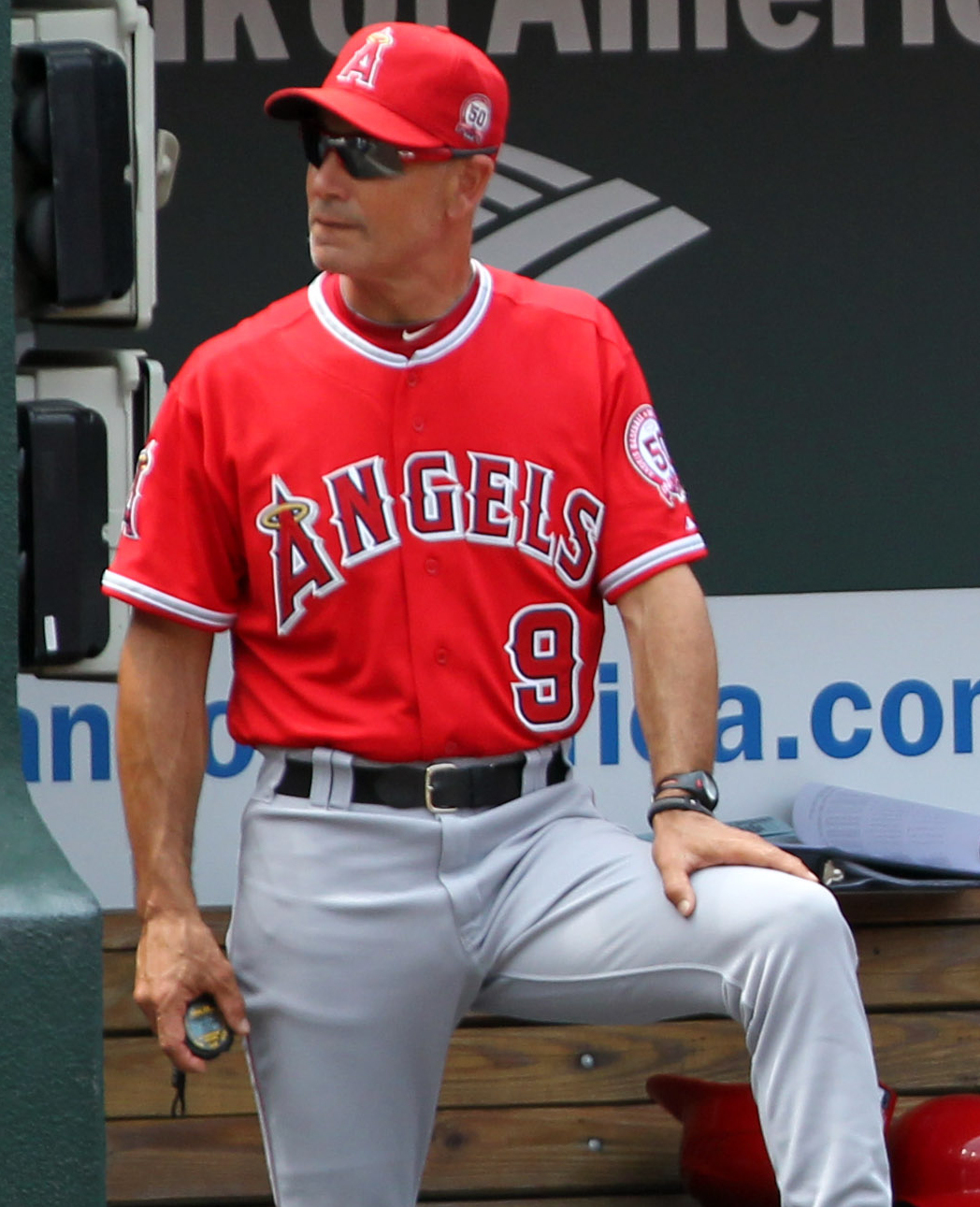
- Picciolo with the Los Angeles Angels of Anaheim in 2011
- Shortstop / Coach
- Born: February 4, 1953; Santa Monica, California, U.S.
- Died: January 3, 2018 (aged 64); Los Angeles, California, U.S.
- Batted: Right Threw: Right

MLB debut
- April 9, 1977, for the Oakland Athletics

Last MLB appearance
- October 6, 1985, for the Oakland Athletics

MLB statistics
- Batting average: .234
- Home runs: 17
- Runs batted in: 109
- Stats at Baseball Reference

Teams
- As player: Oakland Athletics (1977–1982); Milwaukee Brewers (1982–1983); California Angels (1984); Oakland Athletics (1985); As coach: San Diego Padres (1990–2005); Los Angeles Angels of Anaheim (2006–2013)

Robert Michael Picciolo (February 4, 1953 – January 3, 2018) was an American professional baseball player and coach in Major League Baseball (MLB).

== Playing career ==
Picciolo played nine seasons in the major leagues, from 1977–85, for the Oakland Athletics, Milwaukee Brewers, and California Angels, where he was primarily a shortstop; he also played third base and second base.

In 1,628 major league at bats, he walked only 25 times. Picciolo spent 20 years in the San Diego Padres organization after a nine-year big league career playing for the Athletics, Brewers, and Angels.

== Post-playing career ==
He was a minor league manager with the Class-A Short Season Spokane Indians in the Northwest League in 1986 and 1987, winning the League and Division titles in his second season there, then was a roving infield instructor the following two years before being promoted to the Padres big league coaching staff midway through the 1990 season.

There, he served under Padres managers Greg Riddoch, Jim Riggleman and Bruce Bochy as a first base coach (mid-1990-92), a bench coach (1993–2002) and third base coach (2003–05).

Picciolo was the longest-tenured coach in San Diego Padres history, serving 16 consecutive years between 1990 and 2005.

From 2006 to 2010, he served as the Angels' roving infield instructor. He was then named the Angels' bench coach for manager Mike Scioscia on November 10, 2010.

He was fired by the Angels on October 8, 2013.

== Personal life ==
Picciolo graduated from Westchester High School in 1971, earned a bachelor's degree in journalism and played one season of baseball in Pepperdine University. He earned All-District honors and helped Pepperdine to first place in the WCC and a spot in the NCAA District Playoffs. Picciolo died on January 3, 2018, aged 64, from a heart attack.

He was survived by his wife Debbie and two sons, Breton and Dustin, who both attended Pepperdine University in Malibu, California. Breton was a former staffer in the Padres communications department.

Preceded by Ron Roenicke	Los Angeles Angels of Anaheim Bench Coach; 2011–2013	Succeeded by Dino Ebel
