= Billy Carlson (baseball) =

American baseball player (born 2006)

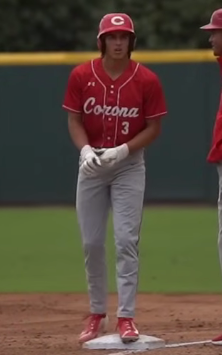
- Carlson with Corona High School in 2024

Chicago White Sox
- Shortstop
- Born: July 29, 2006 (age 20); Mission Viejo, California, U.S.
- Bats: Right Throws: Right
- Stats at Baseball Reference

William Henry Carlson (born July 29, 2006) is an American professional baseball shortstop in the Chicago White Sox organization. He was the 10th overall pick in the 2025 MLB draft.

== Amateur career ==
Carlson attended Corona High School in Corona, California. He played as shortstop and was also a pitcher. At Corona, he was teammates with Seth Hernandez and Brady Ebel. As a junior in 2024, he hit .367 with four home runs and 21 runs batted in (RBI) and had a 0.60 earned run average (ERA) and five saves serving as the team's closer. Entering the 2025 season, Carlson was considered a top prospect for the upcoming MLB draft. As a senior in 2025, he batted .365 with six home runs and 34 RBI. Carlson originally committed to play college baseball at Vanderbilt University before flipping to University of Tennessee.

== Professional career ==
Carlson was selected by the Chicago White Sox with the tenth overall selection of the 2025 Major League Baseball draft. He signed with Chicago for a $6.2 million bonus on July 22, 2025.

Carlson made his professional debut in 2026 with the Single-A Kannapolis Cannon Ballers.
