= Compadre Stadium =

Stadium in Chandler, Arizona

- Interactive map of Compadre Stadium
- Location: 1425 W Ocotillo Road, Chandler, Arizona
- Coordinates: 33°14′40″N 111°51′51″W
- Capacity: 4,900 seated, approx. 10,000 with outfield berm seating
- Surface: Grass
- Field size: Left Field - ft Center Field - ft Right Field - ft

Construction
- Built: 1985
- Opened: 1986
- Closed: 1997
- Demolished: 2014
- Cost: $1.6 million

Tenants
- Milwaukee Brewers (AL) (spring training) (1986–1997); Chandler Diamondbacks (AFL) (1992–1994); Arizona League Brewers (AZL) (1988–1995) (complex); Arizona League Cardinals (AZL) (1993–1994) (complex)

Compadre Stadium was a stadium located in Chandler, Arizona. It was the spring training home of the Milwaukee Brewers from 1986 to 1997 and the home field of the Chandler Diamondbacks of the Arizona Fall League from 1992 to 1994. The ballpark was privately financed by local developers and built at a cost of $1.6 million in 1985. It closed in 1997 and sat abandoned for a number of years, with the outfield being used for grazing, before finally being demolished in 2014.

The stadium was named after the local non-profit Chandler Compadres, who were allowed to keep the parking fees as a fundraiser. The organization later offered to purchase the stadium from Maricopa County after the Brewers moved out in 1997 for $1.6 million.

== History ==
In 1982, Chandler mayor Jim Patterson first approached the Brewers about moving their spring training facility from Sun City to Chandler. Patterson was aware that the owners of the Brewers' spring training ballpark, Sun City Stadium, had sold the facility to private developers and the Brewers would soon need a new spring home. After leaving office, Patterson built a 2,700-acre (11 km^{2}) development he named Ocotillo, in which he placed the ballpark.

In April 1985, the Brewers agreed to move their spring training camp from Sun City to Chandler where local authorities planned to build a 20-acre (81,000 m^{2}) complex in exchange for the Brewers signing a 10-year lease. The Brewers moved into Compadre Stadium for the 1986 Cactus League spring training. The facility was the first Cactus League stadium with grass seating in the outfield. It also featured an artificial lake. The Compadre Stadium complex also offered the Brewers a number of state-of-the art features at the time, including an infield diamond, several batting cages, and on-site practice fields.

The stadium faced problems immediately upon opening. A gas explosion inside the Brewers' locker room at Compadre Stadium during the 1986 spring training seriously burned several of the Brewer coaches, including third base coach Tony Muser. Muser was in line to become the Brewers' manager, but did not because of his injuries. The facility had only been open four days. The Chandler fire department downplayed speculation hasty construction on the stadium had led to the explosion.

Parking was far away from the entrance and the stadium was also on the outskirts of Phoenix; the proximity to nearby farms led a local paper to comment the stadium "smells like hell." The players had to go through the stadium to reach the locker room, and each dugout had only a portable toilet.

The Brewers drew 51,800 fans to Compadre in 1986 and 69,158 in 1987, but after two seasons the stadium did not break even on spring training alone, and the stadium began to look for other events to fill its schedule after sitting idle for most of 1986 to help the Bermuda grass field grow. The stadium then hosted a number of concerts during the spring training offseason.

The then-record Cactus League attendance of 9,812 fans was set on March 26, 1988 at Compadre for a game against the Chicago Cubs.

The stadium was not built with lights and the Brewers negotiated with Chandler about their installation in 1989. Additional practice fields were built on the complex grounds in 1990.

Maricopa County bought the stadium from Patterson's group in 1993.

The stadium became quickly outdated as other Cactus League stadiums were completed or renovated. While state-of-the-art when it opened, the facility quickly fell behind other facilities – for instance, Compadre was the only Cactus League stadium where players had to walk through the bleachers to get from the clubhouse to the dugout. After newer stadiums such as the Peoria Sports Complex or Scottsdale Stadium were completed for other Cactus League teams in the early 1990s, the Brewers requested $12 to $14 million from the city of Chandler to improve the stadium. However, the city of Chandler was only prepared for $9 million in renovations, half of which would have been paid for by Maricopa County. After a $5 million bond election failed in 1996 the Brewers decided to move out. The Brewers departed Compadre after the 1997 season and began Cactus League play the following year at the newly built Maryvale Baseball Park on the west side of the city of Phoenix, where the team holds spring training to this day.

== Abandonment and demolition ==
The stadium structure and field went unused and fell into a state of disrepair after only being used for twelve seasons. After the Brewers departed, some of the minor league practice fields on the site were taken over by the city of Chandler to create a local park, the Snedigar Recreation Center. The seats were removed from the grandstand and animals were allowed to graze in the outfield area, but otherwise the facility was left intact. The facility's concourse was used as office space by the Chandler Compadres, a local non-profit.

In January 2014, Standard Pacific Homes (now CalAtlantic Homes) purchased the property and three months later submitted a proposal to tear down the ballpark and redevelop the lot as a new residential community. Demolition of the remaining complex began in late July 2014.
