= American Family Fields of Phoenix =

Baseball park in Phoenix, Arizona

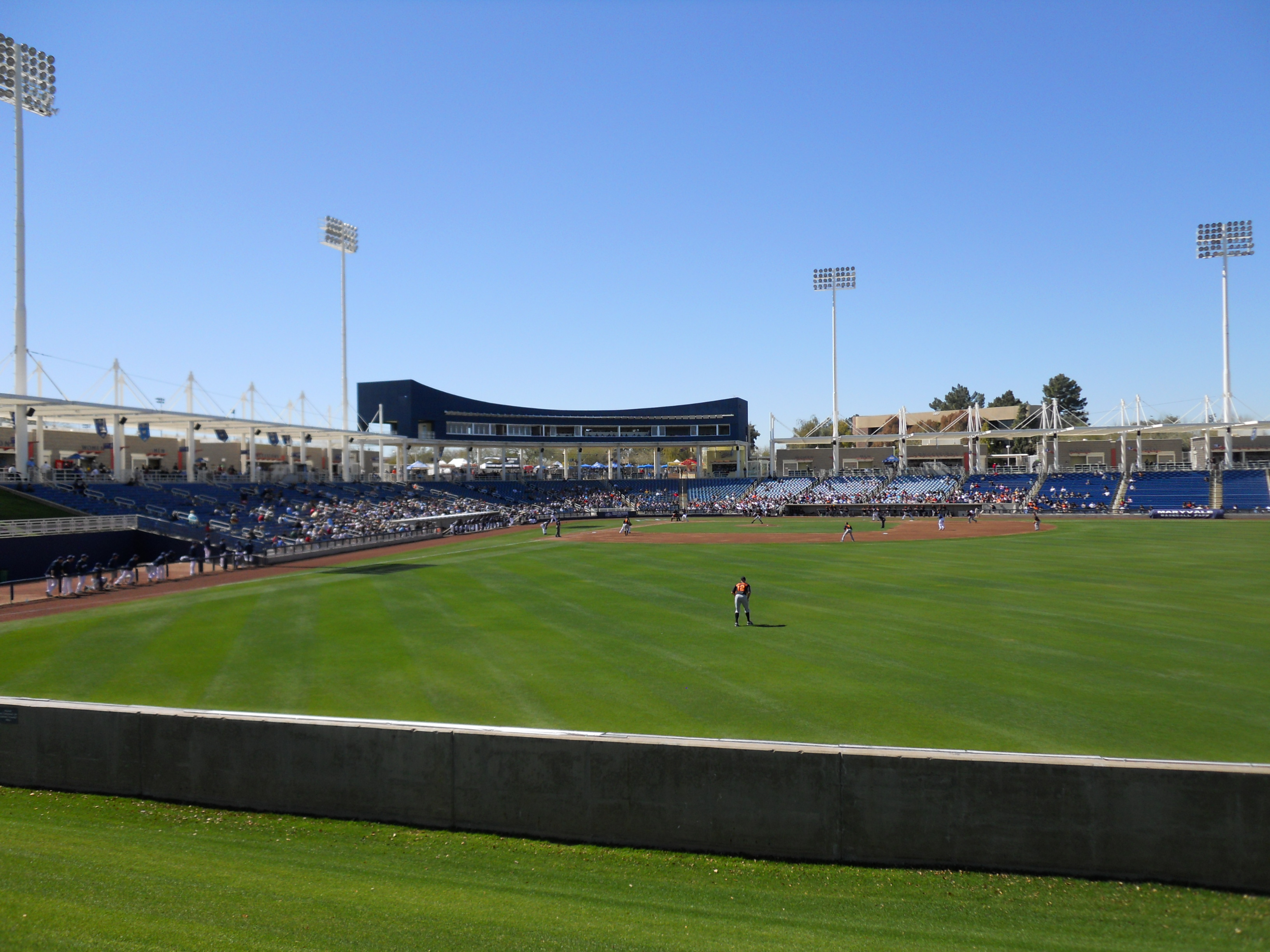
- Interactive map of American Family Fields of Phoenix
- Address: 3805 N. 53rd Avenue; Phoenix, Arizona; United States
- Coordinates: 33°29′32″N 112°10′23″W
- Owner: Phoenix Parks and Recreation Dept.
- Operator: Phoenix Parks and Recreation Dept.
- Capacity: 10,000
- Surface: grass
- Field size: Left field: 350 feet (110 m); Center field: 400 feet (120 m); Right field: 340 feet (100 m)

Construction
- Opened: February 22, 1998
- Renovated: March 2018

Tenants
- Milwaukee Brewers (MLB) (spring training; 1998–present); ACL Brewers (ACL) (1998–present); Maryvale Saguaros (AFL) 1998–2002

Website
- www.mlb.com/brewers/spring-training/ballpark

American Family Fields of Phoenix, formerly known as Maryvale Baseball Park and briefly as Brewers Fields of Phoenix, is a baseball park located in the Maryvale community of Phoenix, Arizona.

The facility is owned and operated by the city's Parks and Recreation department, and holds 10,000 people. It is the spring training home of the Milwaukee Brewers and their minor league affiliates (replacing Compadre Stadium in southeast suburban Chandler). It is also the home stadium to both of the Arizona Complex League Brewers Minor League Baseball teams of the Arizona Complex League. American Family Insurance has naming rights for the Fields. In addition to the main stadium, the facility includes 5 full practice fields, 2 practice infields, a 2-story clubhouse building, and a 2,000-space parking facility.

== Renovations ==
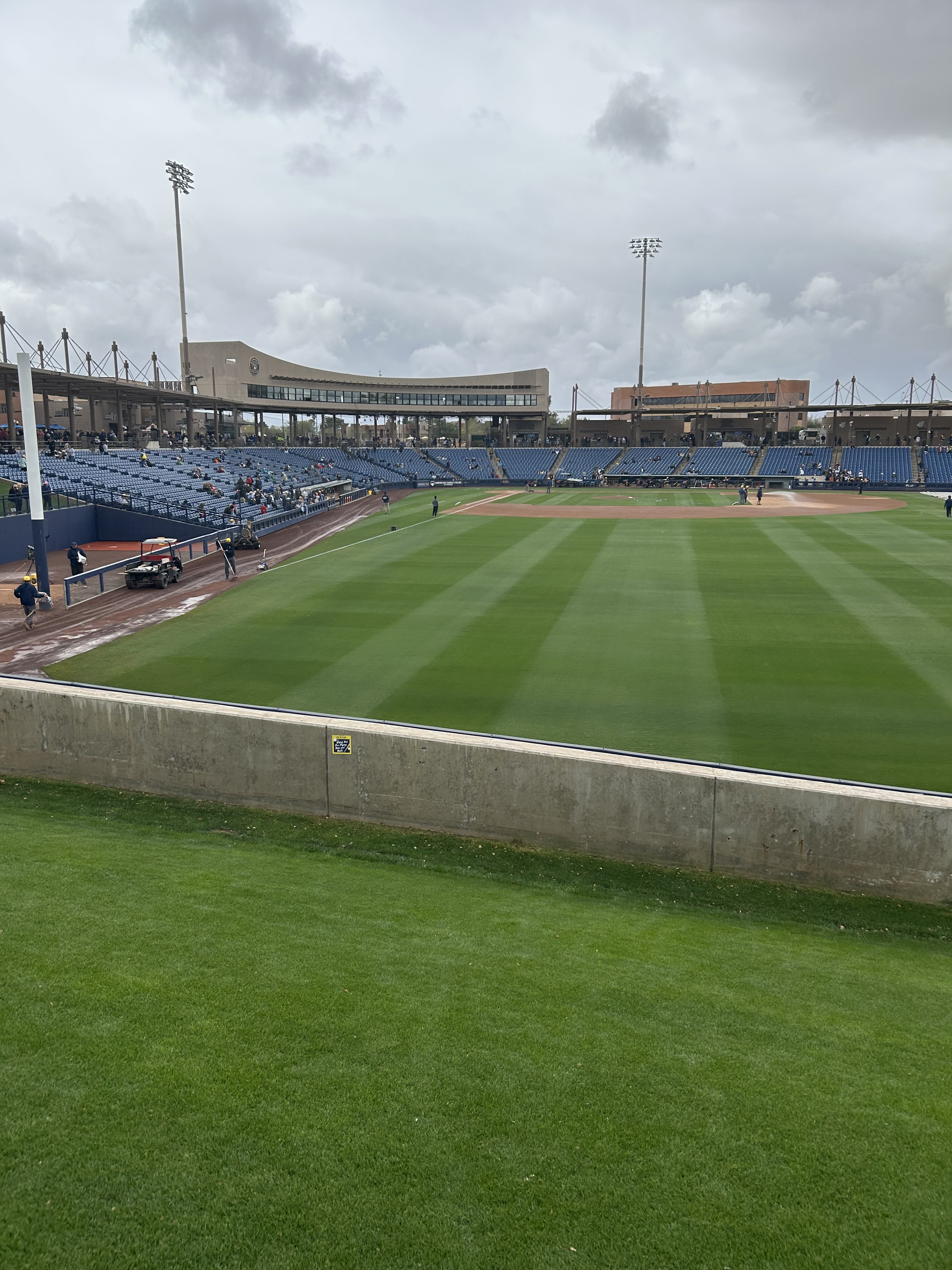
The field in during a Brewers Spring Training game in 2025.

In February 2018, the Brewers announced plans for a major renovation of the facility. The renovation included a new clubhouse building, renovation of the existing Brewers clubhouse, a newly constructed agility field, a new major league practice field, new batting tunnels, covered practice mounds, a new entry plaza, and new & refurbished parking lots. Costs were shared by the Brewers ($56–60 million), the city of Phoenix ($2 million/year over 5 years), and the Arizona Sports and Tourism Authority (approximately $5.7 million). It was completed in time for the 2019 spring training season.
