= Corona High School =

Public high school in California, United States

Coordinates: 33°52′22″N 117°35′10″W

Corona Senior High School
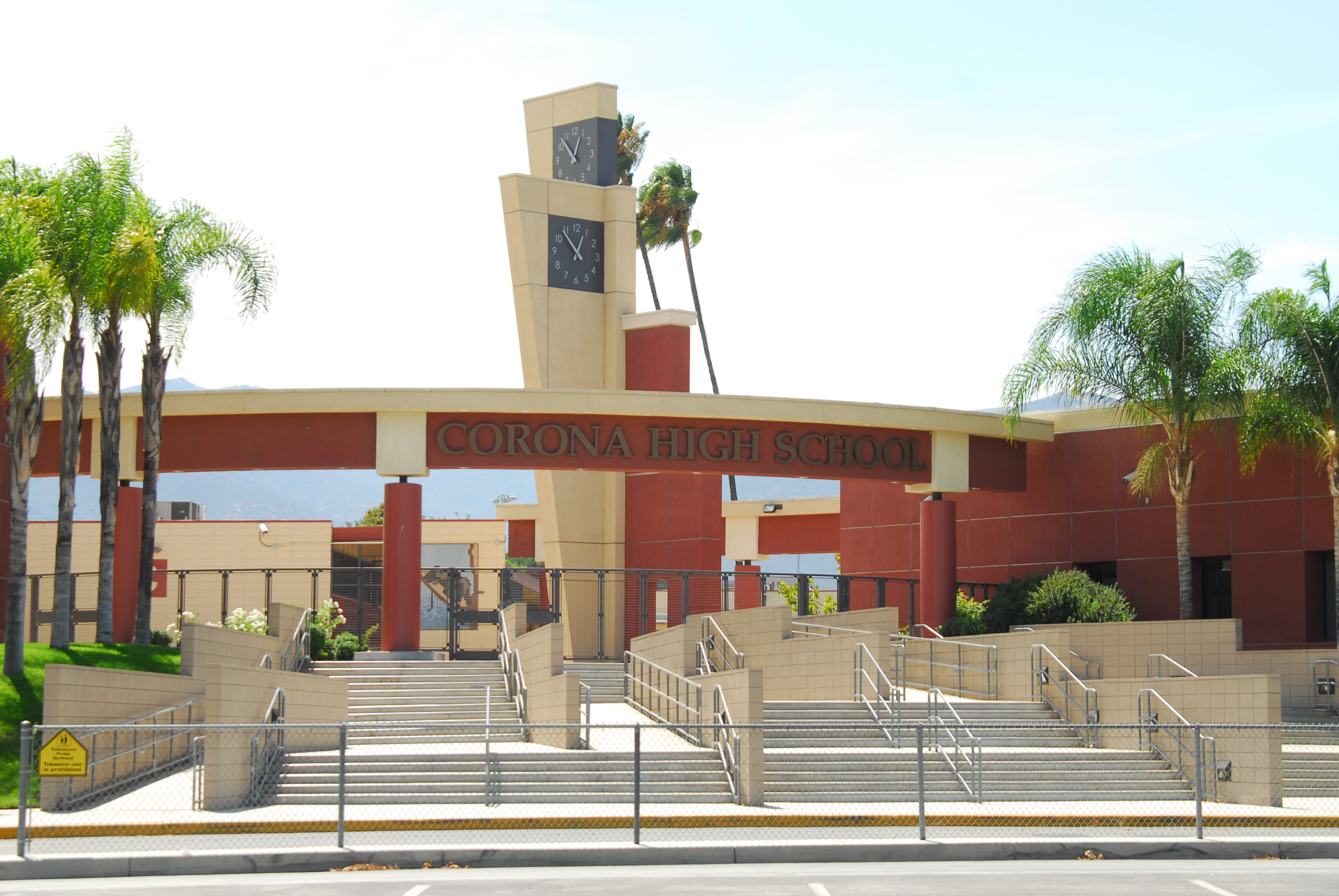
- 1150 West Tenth Street; Corona, California; 92882; United States

Information
- Type: Public high school
- Motto: A Tradition of Excellence
- Established: 1896; 130 years ago
- School district: Corona-Norco Unified School District
- Principal: Ben Sanchez
- Teaching staff: 98.85 (FTE)
- Enrollment: 2,244 (2023-2024)
- Student to teacher ratio: 22.70
- Colors: Red; Gold
- Team name: Panthers
- Website: coronahs.cnusd.k12.ca.us
- Corona High School
- U.S. National Register of Historic Places
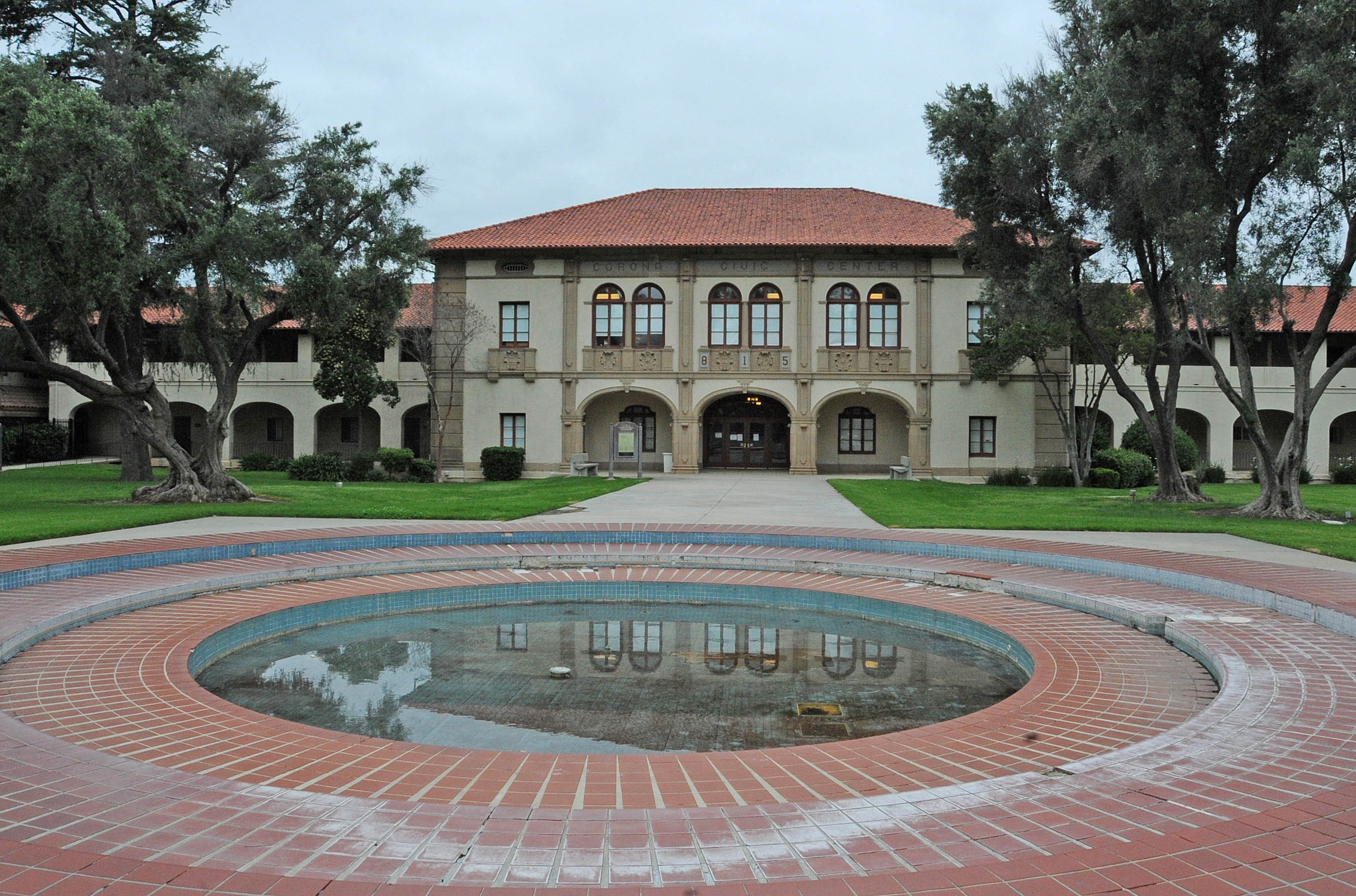
- The historic high school building

- Location within California Location within the United States
- Location: 815 W. 6th St., Corona, California
- Built: 1923
- Architects: G. Stanley Wilson (architect), Richard Sias (landscape architect)
- Architectural style: Mission/Spanish Revival
- NRHP reference No.: 05000772
- Added to NRHP: August 3, 2005

Corona Senior High School (CHS) is a California Distinguished School high school in the city of Corona, California, United States, a growing city in the Inland Empire of Southern California. CHS is one of eight high schools in the Corona-Norco Unified School District.

== History ==
CHS was the first high school in the area, established in 1894 when high school students met in the upper floor of the Corona Grammar school located in what now is called Victoria Park. The second Corona High School was built at 1230 S. Main Street, the current location of Corona Fundamental Intermediate School. This location opened as Corona High School in 1907. By the early twenties, the town outgrew this campus and a third Corona High School location was needed. It opened in 1923 and was constructed, in the Mediterranean Revival style, at 815 West Sixth Street. This campus was designed by G. Stanley Wilson, an architect from Riverside, California, who had also designed parts of the Mission Inn. This campus remained in use as a high school until December 1960, when once again, the number of students exceeded its capacity After the high school moved from its third campus, the campus became Corona's Civic Center and City Hall. This third high school building is now listed on the National Register of Historic Places.

The high school was relocated to 1150 West Tenth Street during the 1960–61 school year to accommodate a rapidly growing number of students wishing to attend. There were no graduates in 1897.

In October 2026, two 15-year old students, one from Corona High School, the other from Norco High School, were arrested for planning a school shooting at Corona High School.

== Students ==
In the 2025-2026 school year, Corona High School had a student population of 2,294. The student body was 79.3% Hispanic or Latino, 10.8% White, 3.5% Asian, 2.4% African American, and 4% in another category. 1,961, or 85.5% of students were eligible for free or reduced lunch. 258, or 11.2% of students were non-fluent English learners, with the vast majority being native Spanish speakers.

== Academics ==
Classes offered include career/technical classes, honors and Advanced Placement, a four-year AVID program, English acquisition, sheltered classes in core subjects, visual and performing arts, and special education.

Students have the opportunity to enroll in advanced placement (AP) courses at Corona High School. Students who successfully pass an optional end-of-course exam generally receive college credit. Of the 302 Advanced Placement Exams taken in Music Theory, English Literature, French and Spanish Languages, Calculus, Sciences (such as Biology and Physics), and Social Sciences (such as European History and Psychology), 61% passed. The school district passing rate was 48.2%. The Riverside County, California state and national passing rates were 45.6%, 57.1%, and 59.6% respectively.

== Notable alumni ==
- Andy Avalos - Former linebacker and head coach at Boise State and current defensive coordinator at TCU.
- Brendan Beck - professional baseball player, San Francisco Giants organization
- Tristan Beck - professional baseball player, San Francisco Giants organization
- Erica Blasberg - golfer who played on the LPGA Tour
- Scott Bloomquist - Hall of Fame dirt racer
- Ken Calvert - Congressman, House of Representatives: 41st congressional district
- Billy Carlson - Chicago White Sox Shortstop
- Darrin Chiaverini - Former NFL receiver and current college coach
- Ryan Chiaverini - Television personality
- Mike Darr - Former Major League Baseball player, San Diego Padres
- Brady Ebel - Milwaukee Brewers Shortstop
- Trey Ebel - Shortstop in the Milwaukee Brewers organization
- Heath Farwell - Former NFL linebacker Super Bowl champion (Seattle Seahawks) and Pro Bowler
- Seth Hernandez - Pittsburgh Pirates Pitcher
- Brian Hildebrand - Former Division I quarterback, Oregon State Beavers
- Jess Hill - Former Major League Baseball player (1935–37), USC football coach (1951–56), USC athletic director (1957–72)
- George Ingalls - Congressional Medal of Honor recipient
- Joe Kelly - Former Major League Baseball player, 2x World Series champion Los Angeles Dodgers/Boston Red Sox
- Mr. Mixx (David P. Hobbs) - Hip hop DJ, producer, co-founder of 2 Live Crew
- Jennifer Ruiz - Professional soccer player
- Matt Spanos - Former USC lineman
- Daiveun Curry-Chapman - Northern Arizona University Wide Receiver (2007-2010) and Arizona Cardinals Wide Receiver (2011)
- Chidera Uzo-Diribe - American football player and coach
- Demetrius Wright - USC Trojans free safety
