= Brock Wilken =

American baseball player (born 2002)

Milwaukee Brewers
- Third baseman
- Born: June 17, 2002 (age 23); Albuquerque, New Mexico, U.S.
- Bats: Right Throws: Right
- Stats at Baseball Reference

Brock Caleb Wilken (born June 17, 2002) is an American professional baseball third baseman in the Milwaukee Brewers organization.

== Amateur career ==
Wilken attended Bloomingdale High School located in Valrico, Florida. As a junior in 2019, he batted .468 with 12 home runs and 26 RBIs over 25 games. His senior season in 2020 was cut short due to the COVID-19 pandemic, but he still hit four home runs over eight games.

After not being selected in the 2020 Major League Baseball draft, Wilken enrolled at Wake Forest University and instantly became their starting third baseman as a freshman in 2021. Over 47 starts, he slashed .279/.365/.617 with 17 home runs, a team-high 44 RBIs, and 41 runs scored. His 17 home runs were most by a Wake Forest freshman ever. After the season, he played collegiate summer baseball with the Harwich Mariners of the Cape Cod Baseball League, and was named the league's Most Valuable Player after batting .302 with six home runs and 26 RBIs over 38 games. As a sophomore in 2022, Wilken appeared in sixty games and batted .272 with 23 home runs and 77 RBIs. He returned to play for Harwich that summer, and was named a league all-star. He was chosen to try out for the USA Baseball National Collegiate Team, but was not selected. As a junior in 2023, Wilken played in 66 games and hit .345 with 82 RBIs and 31 home runs, setting a Wake Forest and Atlantic Coast Conference single-season record. His ACC record was broken in 2026 by Tague Davis. His 71 career home runs are also an ACC record.

== Professional career ==
The Milwaukee Brewers selected Wilken in the first round, with the 18th overall pick, in the 2023 Major League Baseball draft. He signed with the Brewers on July 17, 2023 for $3,150,000. Wilken played for the rookie–level Arizona Complex League Brewers, High–A Wisconsin Timber Rattlers, and Double–A Biloxi Shuckers, accumulating a .285/.414/.473 batting line with five home runs, 29 RBI, and four stolen bases across 47 total games.

Wilken began the 2024 season back with Biloxi. On April 11, 2024, Wilken suffered multiple facial fractures after he was hit in the face by a pitch from Mississippi Braves reliever Domingo Gonzalez. He spent one month on the injured list before returning to play. Over 108 games played with Biloxi, Wilken hit .199 with 17 home runs and 51 RBIs. Wilken returned to Biloxi for the 2025 season, but missed two months due to a patella injury. He batted .226 with 18 home runs and 46 RBIs over 79 games.
