= Arizona Complex League Brewers =

Minor League Baseball team in Phoenix, Arizona

- (1988–1995, 2001–present); Phoenix, Arizona

Minor league affiliations
- Class: Rookie
- League: Arizona Complex League (2021–present)
- Division: Central Division
- Previous leagues: Arizona League (1988–1995, 2001–2020)

Major league affiliations
- Team: Milwaukee Brewers

Minor league titles
- League titles (5): 1988; 1989; 1990; 2010; 2023
- Division titles (2): 2010; 2023
- First-half titles (1): 2017

Team data
- Name: ACL Brewers (2023–present)
- Previous names: ACL Brewers Blue (2021–2022); ACL Brewers Gold (2021–2022); AZL Brewers Blue (2019–2020); AZL Brewers Gold (2019–2020); AZL Brewers (1988–1995, 2001–2018)
- Colors: Navy blue, yellow
- Ballpark: American Family Fields of Phoenix (2001–present)
- Previous parks: Compadre Stadium (1988–1995)
- Owner/ Operator: Milwaukee Brewers
- Manager: Rafael Neda

The Arizona Complex League Brewers are a Minor League Baseball team of the Arizona Complex League (ACL) and a Rookie-level affiliate of the Milwaukee Brewers. They are located in Phoenix, Arizona, and play their home games at American Family Fields of Phoenix.

Established as members of the Arizona League (AZL) in its inaugural 1988 season, the Arizona League Brewers played at Compadre Stadium until 1995. Milwaukee did not operate a team in the league from 1996 through 2000, but it returned to play in 2001 at American Family Fields of Phoenix, then known as Maryvale Baseball Park. With the reorganization of Minor League Baseball in 2021, the AZL Brewers became the ACL Brewers after their league was renamed. Milwaukee fielded two squads from 2019 to 2022: the AZL/ACL Brewers Blue and AZL/ACL Brewers Gold. The Brewers have won five ACL championships, including three consecutive titles in their first three seasons and most recently in 2023.

== History ==
The Arizona League Brewers were one of four teams to compete in the inaugural Arizona League (AZL) season of 1988. The short-season Rookie classification league was created to serve as a developmental league, similar to extended spring training, specifically for recently drafted high school and Latin American players. The Brewers played their home games at Compadre Stadium in Chandler, Arizona. This was the spring training site of the Milwaukee Brewers, who operated the team.

The AZL Brewers' first game was a 13–11 victory over the AZL Mariners/Red Sox on June 23, 1988. Managed by Alex Taveras, the Brewers won the first Arizona League championship with a league-best 40–18 record. Jeff Nate led the Brewers to a second AZL title in 1989, topping the league with a 40–15 mark. They won a third consecutive AZL championship in 1990 with a league-best 36–17 record under the returning Taveras. The Brewers posted winning records in each of their next five seasons, but did not finish atop the league standings.

Following the 1995 season, Milwaukee moved their Rookie affiliation from Chandler to the Ogden Raptors of the Pioneer League in Ogden, Utah, to escape Arizona's summer heat and provide their players with better working conditions. They returned to operations in the Arizona League in 2001. From this point, they played their home games at Maryvale Baseball Park (now called American Family Fields of Phoenix), Milwaukee's spring training site since 1998.

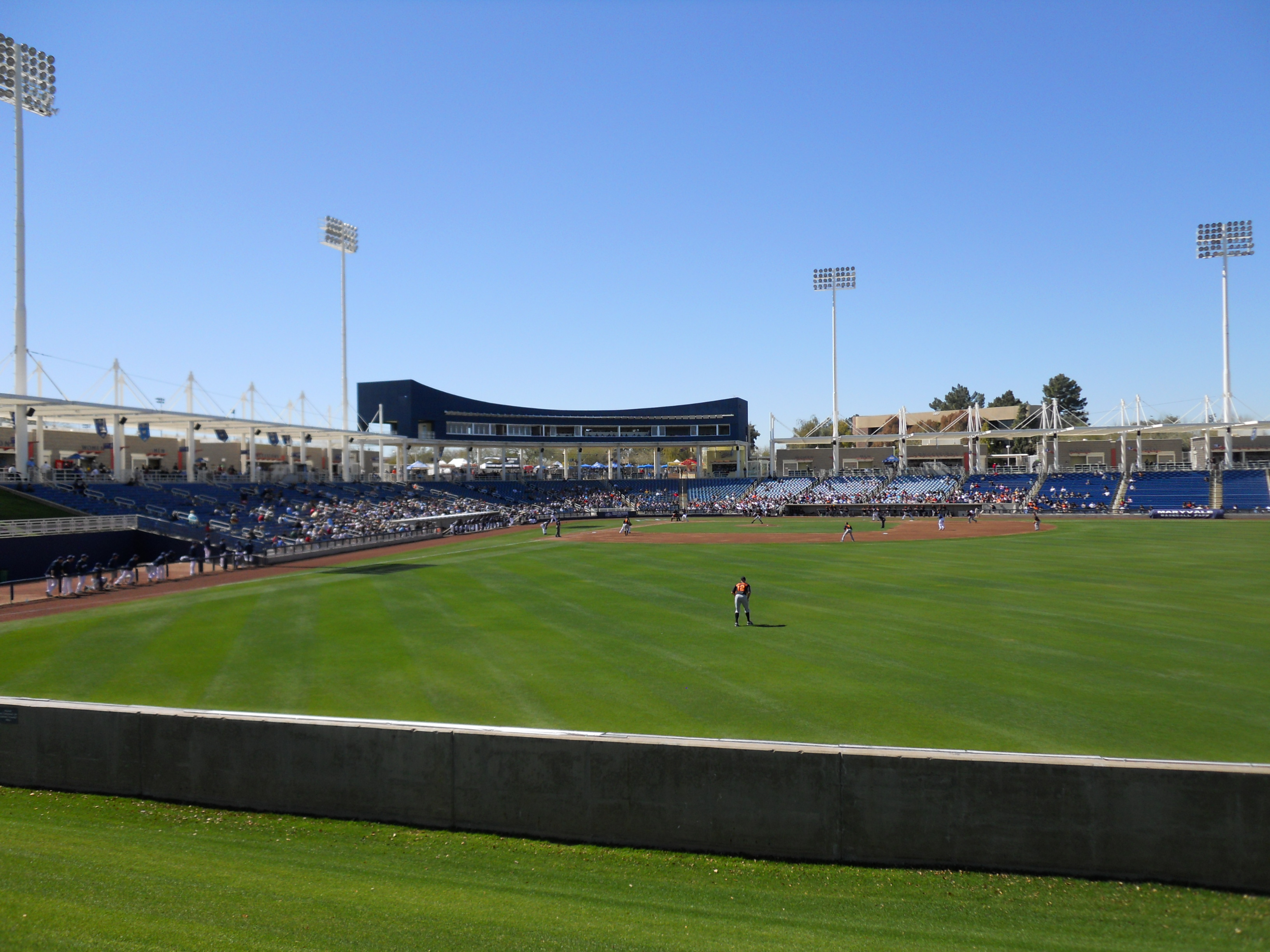
The Brewers have played at American Family Fields of Phoenix since 2001.

Unlike AZL Brewers teams from the initial 1988 to 1995 run, those in the second stretch starting in 2001 posted losing records through 2009. Despite the team's results, two Brewers were selected for the Arizona League Most Valuable Player Award during this period: Hernán Iribarren in 2004 and Lorenzo Cain in 2005.

In the 2010 season, manager Tony Diggs led the team to win the Central Division title and a berth in the AZL's limited playoffs. The Brewers defeated the AZL Rangers in a single semifinal game before winning the championship game versus the AZL Reds to earn their fourth league crown. Diggs won the league's Manager of the Year Award.

After this success in 2010, the Brewers returned to posting losing records each season from 2011 to 2016. Rafael Neda's 2017 Brewers qualified for the playoffs by winning the First Half Central Division title, but they were eliminated by the AZL Cubs in the quarterfinal match.

In 2019, Milwaukee began fielding two Arizona League squads. AZL Brewers Blue and AZL Brewers Gold, named for their major league team's colors, were created to allow ample playing time for the Brewers' large number of recent high school draftees and international signings. Prior to the 2021 season, the Arizona League was renamed the Arizona Complex League (ACL). In 2022, Brewers Blue outfielder Jace Avina was chosen for the ACL Most Valuable Player Award.

Milwaukee consolidated its Blue and Gold squads into a single team in 2023. They qualified for the playoffs that season for the first time since 2017 by winning the Central Division, 31–25. They defeated the ACL Rockies in a single game, 3–2, to advance to the best-of-three finals. The Brewers won their fifth ACL championship over the ACL Diamondbacks Red, 2–1. Reliever Gerson Calzadilla was chosen for the ACL Pitcher of the Year Award.

== Season-by-season records ==
Key
| League | The team's final position in the league standings |
| Division | The team's final position in the divisional standings |
| GB | Games behind the team that finished in first place in the division that season |
| † | League champions (1988–present) |
| * | Division champions (2009–present) |
| ^ | Postseason berth (2001–present) |

Season-by-season records
| Season | Regular-season | | | | | Postseason | | | Ref. |
| Season | Record | Win % | League | Division | GB | Record | Win % | Result | Ref. |
|---|---|---|---|---|---|---|---|---|---|
| 1988 † | 40–18 | .690 | 1st | — | — | — | — | Result | Won AZL championship |
| 1989 † | 41–15 | .732 | 1st | — | — | — | — | Won AZL championship | |
| 1990 † | 36–17 | .679 | 1st | — | — | — | — | Won AZL championship | |
| 1991 | 34–26 | .567 | 2nd | — | 5 | — | — | — | |
| 1992 | 31–25 | .554 | 4th | — | 3 | — | — | — | |
| 1993 | 29–27 | .518 | 5th | — | 6 1/2 | — | — | — | |
| 1994 | 32–24 | .571 | 2nd (tie) | — | 2 | — | — | — | |
| 1995 | 34–22 | .607 | 3rd | — | 3 | — | — | — | |
| 2001 | 27–29 | .482 | 4th | — | 8 | — | — | — | |
| 2002 | 26–30 | .464 | 6th | — | 9 | — | — | — | |
| 2003 | 18–37 | .327 | 9th | — | 19 1/2 | — | — | — | |
| 2004 | 24–32 | .429 | 8th | — | 13 | — | — | — | |
| 2005 | 22–34 | .393 | 8th | — | 17 | — | — | — | |
| 2006 | 21–35 | .375 | 8th | — | 15 1/2 | — | — | — | |
| 2007 | 19–37 | .339 | 9th | — | 18 | — | — | — | |
| 2008 | 13–42 | .236 | 9th | — | 25 1/2 | — | — | — | |
| 2009 | 25–31 | .446 | 7th | 4th | 14 | — | — | — | |
| 2010 * † | 34–22 | .607 | 2nd | 1st | — | 2–0 | 1.000 | Won Central Division title Won semifinals vs. AZL Rangers, 1–0; Won AZL championship vs. AZL Reds, 1–0 | |
| 2011 | 17–39 | .304 | 13th | 4th | 17 | — | — | — | |
| 2012 | 19–37 | .339 | 11th | 3rd | 15 1/2 | — | — | — | |
| 2013 | 23–33 | .411 | 10th | 3rd | 11 | — | — | — | |
| 2014 | 24–31 | .436 | 10th | 3rd | 14 | — | — | — | |
| 2015 | 23–33 | .411 | 12th (tie) | 4th (tie) | 7 1/2 | — | — | — | |
| 2016 | 24–29 | .453 | 12th | 4th | 8 | — | — | — | |
| 2017^ | 33–23 | .589 | 3rd | 2nd | 4 | 0–1 | .000 | Won First Half Central Division title Lost quarterfinals vs. AZL Cubs, 1–0 | |
| 2018 | 22–33 | .400 | 15th | 5th | 14 1/2 | — | — | — | |
| 2019^{Blue} | 23–33 | .411 | 16th | 6th | 10 | — | — | — | |
| 2019^{Gold} | 16–40 | .286 | 21st | 6th | 23 | — | — | — | |
| 2020^{Blue} | Season cancelled (COVID-19 pandemic) | | | | | | | | |
| 2020^{Gold} | Season cancelled (COVID-19 pandemic) | | | | | | | | |
| 2021^{Blue} | 21–33 | .389 | 15th | 6th | 11 1/2 | — | — | — | |
| 2021^{Gold} | 26–23 | .531 | 8th | 2nd | 9 | — | — | — | |
| 2022^{Blue} | 19–34 | .538 | 17th | 6th | 14 | — | — | — | |
| 2022^{Gold} | 32–21 | .604 | 5th | 2nd | 1 | — | — | — | |
| 2023 * † | 31–25 | .554 | 5th (tie) | 1st | — | 3–1 | .750 | Won Central Division title Won semifinals vs. ACL Rockies, 1–0; Won ACL championship vs. ACL Diamondbacks Red, 2–1 | |
| 2024 | 28–32 | .467 | 9th (tie) | 4th | 12 | — | — | — | |
| 2025 | 30–30 | .500 | 10th | 3rd | 8 | — | — | — | |
| 2026 | 26–34 | .433 | 11th | 4th | 9 1/2 | — | — | — | |
| Totals | 943–1,066 | .469 | — | — | — | 5–2 | .714 | — | — |

== Roster ==
Arizona Complex League Brewers roster
| Players | Coaches/Other |
|---|---|
| Pitchers: 70 Argenis Aparicio; 49 Chase Bentley; 67 Frank Cairone; -- Andrew Gaines; -- Julian Garcia; -- Sam George; -- Grant Hill; 41 Ma'Kale Holden; 24 Dariel Jaquez; 11 Wenderlyn King; 47 Jared Koenig *; -- Marcus Kruzan; -- Keaton Maiorana; -- Chase Mora; 57 Caleb Nieman; 65 Jhosep Ospino; 33 Joan Pena; -- Gavin Perry; 47 Bryan Regalado; 53 Luke Roupe; -- Brady Smith; 46 Hayden Vucinovich; Catchers: -- Kendall Hagedorn; 13 Freider Rojas; Infielders: 68 Cristopher Acosta; -- Trey Ebel; 10 Roderick Flores; 5 CJ Hughes; 23 Yu-Lin Liao; 2 Moises Polanco; 35 Jonathan Rangel; 6 Leonard Rijo; -- Chance Ruby; -- Carsten Sabathia III; -- Kellan Tom; Outfielders: 22 Kenny Fenelon; 3 Malachai Halterman; -- Kyle Jones; 15 Engel Paulino; 37 Gerlyn Payano; -- Sawyer Strosnider | Manager: 12 Rafael Neda; Coaches: 43 Jairo Cueves (pitching); 53 Luisa Gauci (hitting); 31 Dillon Leveille (coach); 48 Jared Matheson (coach); 2 Fidel Pena (bench); 60-day injured list: 27 Luis Corobo; -- Sean Episcope; -- Joshua Flores (full season); -- Chang Tzu-Chun Lin (full season); -- Ryan Oshinskie (full season); -- Cole Phillips; -- Johandry Ramirez; -- Russell Smith; 7-day injured list; * On Milwaukee Brewers 40-man roster; ~ Development list; # Rehab assignment; ∞ Reserve list; ‡ Restricted list; § Suspended list; † Temporarily inactive list; Roster updated August 2, 2026; Transactions; → More rosters: MiLB • Arizona Complex League; → Milwaukee Brewers minor league players |
