= Eric Brown (baseball) =

American baseball player (born 2000)

Milwaukee Brewers
- Shortstop
- Born: December 19, 2000 (age 25); Tucson, Arizona, U.S.
- Bats: Right Throws: Right

Eric Murice Brown Jr. (born December 19, 2000) is an American professional baseball shortstop in the Milwaukee Brewers organization.

== Amateur career ==
Brown attended Parkway High School in Bossier City, Louisiana where he played on their baseball team. In 2018, his junior season, he hit .340 with three home runs and 29 RBIs. As a senior in 2019, he batted .523 with six home runs, 36 RBIs, and six triples. Unselected in the 2019 Major League Baseball draft, he enrolled at Coastal Carolina University to play college baseball.

During Brown's freshman year at Coastal Carolina in 2020, he started 16 games and hit .259 before the season was cancelled due to the COVID-19 pandemic. As a sophomore in 2021, he started fifty games in which he batted .294 with nine home runs, 38 RBIs, and 11 stolen bases. That summer, he played in the Cape Cod Baseball League for the Cotuit Kettleers and was named to the All-Star team. He opened the 2022 season as the Sun Belt Conference Preseason Player of the Year. For the season, he played in 57 games and slashed .330/.460/.544 with seven home runs and forty RBIs. Following the season's end, he traveled to San Diego where he participated in the Draft Combine.

== Professional career ==
Brown was selected by the Milwaukee Brewers in the first round with the 27th overall selection of the 2022 Major League Baseball draft. He signed with the team for $2.05 million.

Brown made his professional debut with the Arizona Complex League Brewers and was promoted to the Carolina Mudcats after four games. Over 27 games between the two teams, Brown batted .268 with three home runs, eight RBIs, and 19 stolen bases. He opened the 2023 season with the Wisconsin Timber Rattlers. He was promoted to the Biloxi Shuckers near the season's end. He missed time during the season due to a sore thumb and a hairline fracture in his left scapula. Over 72 games for the season, he hit .255 with six home runs, 27 RBIs, and 39 stolen bases. He was selected to play in the Arizona Fall League with the Surprise Saguaros.

Brown was assigned to Biloxi for the 2024 season. Over 105 games, he batted .185 with four home runs, 38 RBIs, and twenty stolen bases. Brown returned to Biloxi to open the 2025 season. He missed time due to injury and appeared in only 28 games in which he hit .157 with one home run. To begin the 2026 season, Brown was assigned back to Biloxi for the third straight year and was promoted to the Nashville Sounds in July. He played in 70 games across both teams and batted .228 with six home runs and 28 RBIs.
