= Braylon Payne =

American baseball player (born 2006)

Milwaukee Brewers
- Outfielder
- Born: August 14, 2006 (age 20); Houston, Texas, U.S.
- Bats: Left Throws: Left
- Stats at Baseball Reference

Braylon Isaiah-Todd Payne (born August 14, 2006) is an American professional baseball outfielder in the Milwaukee Brewers organization.

== Amateur career ==
Payne attended Elkins High School in Missouri City, Texas. He stole 46 bases as a junior. He batted .531 with three home runs and 32 stolen bases, and broke the school's all-time hit record as a senior. He committed to play college baseball at the University of Houston.

== Professional career ==
Payne was selected by the Milwaukee Brewers with the 17th overall pick in the 2024 Major League Baseball draft. On July 23, 2024, Payne signed with the Brewers on a contract worth $3.44 million.

Payne made his professional debut after signing with the Single-A Carolina Mudcats, hitting .438 over four games. He returned to Carolina for the 2025 season. Over 77 games, he hit .240 with eight home runs, 30 RBI, and 31 stolen bases. Payne was assigned to the High-A Wisconsin Timber Rattlers to open the 2026 season. In August, he was promoted to the Double-A Biloxi Shuckers. Over 102 games, Payne batted .277 with 28 home runs, 67 RBI, and 25 stolen bases. After the season, he was assigned to play in the Arizona Fall League with the Scottsdale Scorpions.
