= Trey Ebel =

American baseball player (born 2008)

Milwaukee Brewers
- Shortstop
- Born: September 29, 2008 (age 17); Las Vegas, Nevada, U.S.
- Bats: Right Throws: Right

Trey Michael Ebel (born September 29, 2008) is an American professional baseball shortstop in the Milwaukee Brewers organization. He was selected by the Brewers in the first round (25th overall) of the 2026 Major League Baseball draft.

== Early life ==
Ebel was born on September 29, 2008, in Las Vegas, Nevada. He is the son of minor league baseball player and coach Dino Ebel. He and his older brother, Brady, grew up playing baseball, and both of them first attended Etiwanda High School in Rancho Cucamonga, California. For his sophomore year, Ebel and his brother transferred to Corona High School. As a junior at Corona, he helped the team to a record of 28–3 with an appearance in the CIF Southern Section Division I championship, batting .314 while posting two home runs and 22 runs batted in (RBIs). After his junior year, Ebel was selected for the Perfect Game All-American Classic. He then batted .417 as a senior with nine home runs and 47 RBI.

Ebel committed to play college baseball for the Texas A&M Aggies.

== Professional career ==
Ebel was selected by the Milwaukee Brewers in the first round (25th overall) of the 2026 Major League Baseball draft. On July 17, Ebel signed with the Brewers for a signing bonus of $2.8 million.

== Personal life ==
His father, Dino Ebel, is the current third base coach for the Los Angeles Dodgers. His brother, Brady, had been selected by the Brewers in the first round of the 2025 Major League Baseball draft.
