= Adley Rutschman =

American baseball player (born 1998)

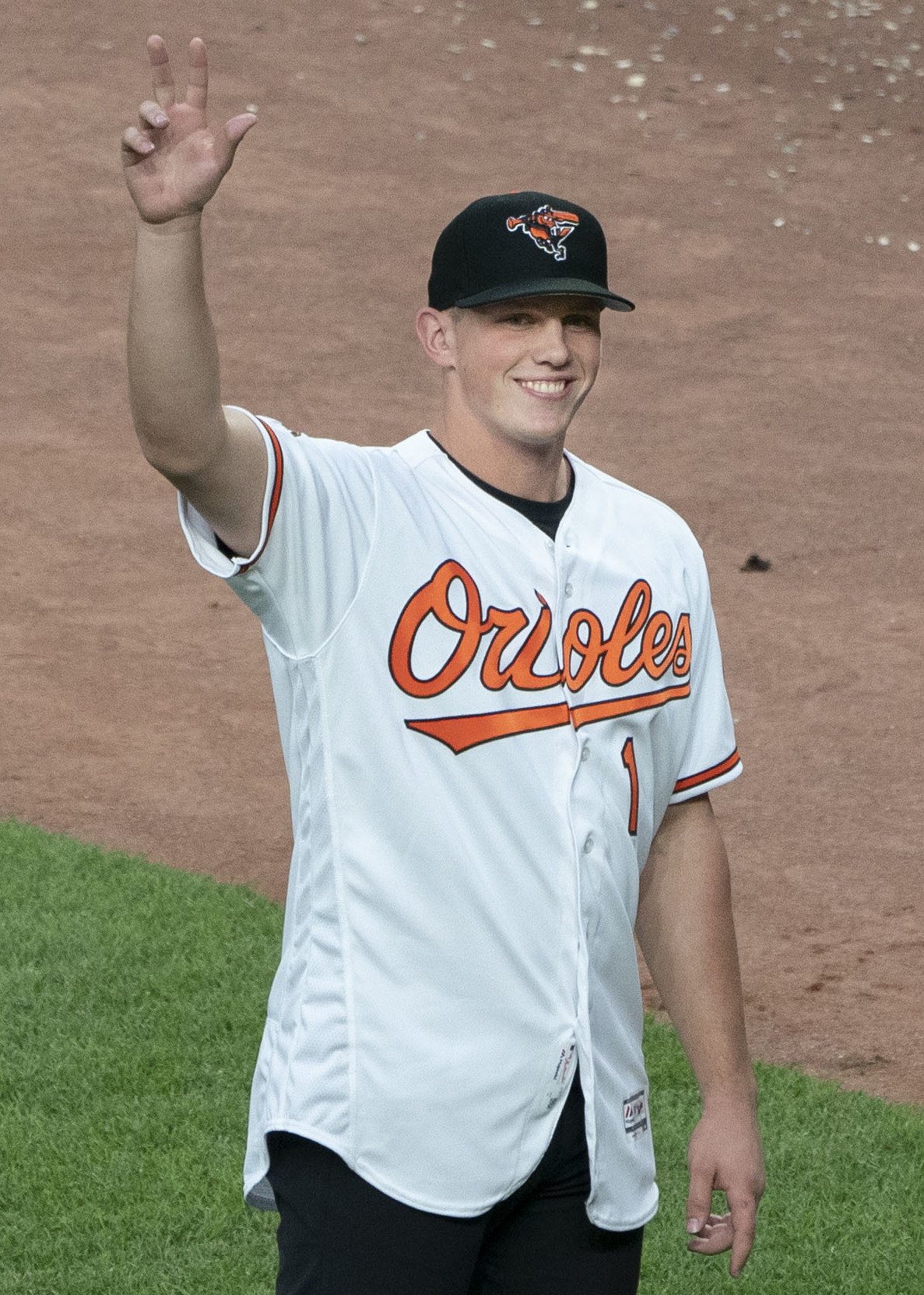
- Rutschman at Camden Yards in 2019

Boston Red Sox – No. 31
- Catcher
- Born: February 6, 1998 (age 28); Portland, Oregon, U.S.
- Bats: Switch Throws: Right

MLB debut
- May 21, 2022, for the Baltimore Orioles

MLB statistics (through 2026 season)
- Batting average: .252
- Home runs: 74
- Runs batted in: 290
- Stats at Baseball Reference

Teams
- Baltimore Orioles (2022–2026); Boston Red Sox (2026–present)

Career highlights and awards
- 3× All-Star (2023, 2024, 2026); All-MLB First Team (2023); Silver Slugger Award (2023); Golden Spikes Award (2019); Dick Howser Trophy (2019)

Adley Stan Rutschman (born February 6, 1998) is an American professional baseball catcher for the Boston Red Sox of Major League Baseball (MLB). He has previously played in MLB for the Baltimore Orioles. Rutschman played college baseball for the Oregon State Beavers, where he won the Golden Spikes Award and Dick Howser Trophy. He was selected by the Orioles with the first overall pick in the 2019 MLB draft, and made his MLB debut in 2022. Rutschman is a three-time All-Star and won a Silver Slugger Award while playing for Baltimore.

== Early life and college ==
Rutschman attended Sherwood High School in Sherwood, Oregon, and was drafted by the Seattle Mariners in the 40th round of the 2016 Major League Baseball draft. He did not sign with the Mariners and attended Oregon State University, where he played college baseball for the Beavers.

Rutschman played college football for the Beavers as a placekicker his freshman year. In baseball, his freshman year, he played in 61 games, hitting .234/.322/.306 with two home runs and 33 runs batted in (RBI). After the 2017 season, he played collegiate summer baseball with the Falmouth Commodores of the Cape Cod Baseball League. As a sophomore in 2018, he batted .408/.505/.628 with nine home runs and 83 RBIs and helped lead Oregon State to win the 2018 College World Series, their 3rd NCAA Division I Baseball National Championship. Rutschman had 17 hits, a College World Series record, and 13 RBIs in the series, for which he was named College World Series Most Outstanding Player.

In 2019, his junior season, he batted .411/.575/.751 with 17 home runs and 58 RBIs. That year, Rutschman was named the 2019 Collegiate Baseball Player of the Year by Collegiate Baseball Newspaper and was the Pac-12 Conference Player of the Year.. In late June, Rutschman was named the 2019 recipient of the Buster Posey Award, which is given to the nation's top collegiate catcher. Rutschman also won ABCA/Rawlings Gold Glove Award at catcher position in NCAA Div. I in same year.

== Professional career ==
=== Draft and minor leagues ===
The Baltimore Orioles chose Rutschman with the first overall selection in the 2019 Major League Baseball draft. He signed for $8.1 million, the highest signing bonus at the time. He made his professional debut with the rookie–level Gulf Coast League Orioles, and, after five games, was promoted to the Low–A Aberdeen IronBirds. After three weeks with the IronBirds, Rutschman was promoted to the Single–A Delmarva Shorebirds of the South Atlantic League. Over 37 games between the three clubs, he slashed .254/.351/.423 with four home runs and 26 RBIs.

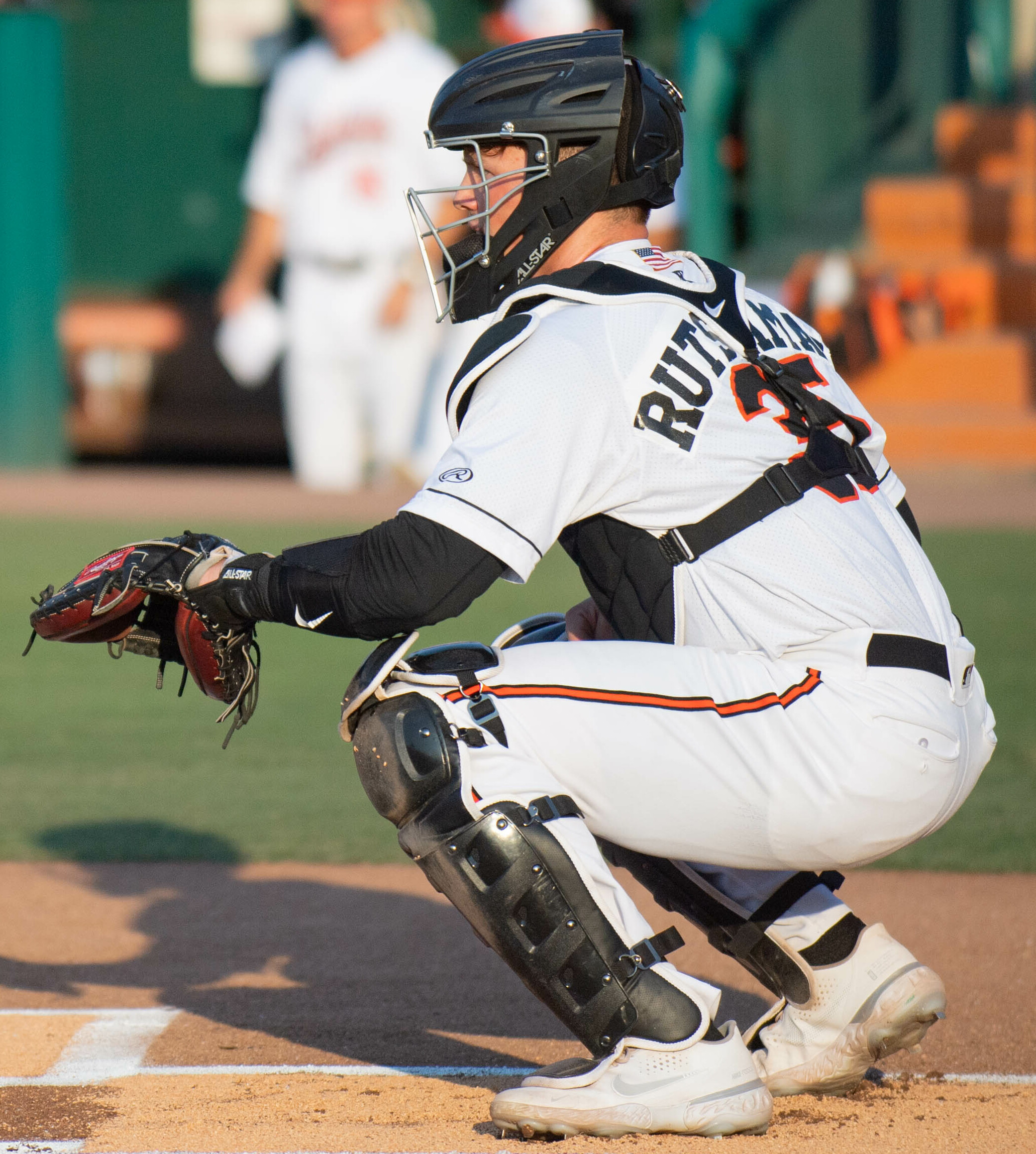
Rutschman with the Bowie Baysox in 2021

After the canceled 2020 minor league season, Rutschman was assigned to the Double-A Bowie Baysox to start the 2021 season. In June 2021, Rutschman was selected to play in the All-Star Futures Game. On August 9, 2021, Rutschman was promoted to Triple-A Norfolk Tides, after slashing .271/.392/.508 with 18 home runs and 55 RBIs in 80 games with Bowie. He batted .312/.405/.490 with 5 home runs and 20 RBIs in 43 games with Norfolk. In November 2021, Rutschman was awarded the Rawlings MiLB Gold Glove Award as the best defensive catcher in the minor leagues.

=== Baltimore Orioles (2022–2026) ===
==== 2022 ====
Rutschman competed for a spot on the Orioles 2022 Opening Day roster, but he missed the start of the season due to a strained triceps muscle. He began a rehabilitation assignment with Aberdeen on April 26. On May 21, 2022, Rutschman was promoted to the major leagues for the first time. During his first game, that same day, he got the start playing catcher and batting 6th in the lineup. His first major league at-bat resulted in a strikeout, but two at-bats later, he got his first hit, a triple. On June 15, Rutschman hit his first major league home run off Toronto Blue Jays starter José Berríos. Rutschman finished the season hitting .254/.362/.445 with 35 doubles, 13 home runs and 42 RBIs in 113 games with Baltimore. He was voted the winner of the 2022 Louis M. Hatter Most Valuable Oriole Award by members of the local media. Rutschman also finished second in voting for American League (AL) Rookie of the Year to Mariners outfielder Julio Rodríguez, receiving one first-place vote.

==== 2023 ====
On Opening Day in the 2023 season, Rutschman batted 5-for-5 with a home run, becoming the first MLB player to do so on Opening Day since 1937. He was selected to his first All-Star Game in 2023 after putting up a .273/.376/.423 slash line with 12 home runs in the first half of the season. Rutschman was also selected to participate in the 2023 Major League Baseball Home Run Derby, where he hit 27 home runs in the first round but was eliminated by Chicago White Sox slugger Luis Robert Jr.'s 28 home runs. Rutschman, a switch hitter, notably hit 20 home runs left-handed and 7 home runs right-handed in his derby appearance. On August 10, 2023, Rutschman became the first Oriole to homer over the extended left field wall while batting left handed, launching a leadoff homer off of Houston Astros starter Hunter Brown. Rutschman won the AL Silver Slugger Award among catchers. Rutschman was a finalist at catcher for the Gold Glove Award, losing to Jonah Heim of the Texas Rangers.

==== 2024 ====
On Opening Day 2024, Rutschman became the first player to reach base safely in at least each of his first eight career plate appearances on Opening Day since Joe Lahoud, who also reached safely in eight consecutive plate appearances from 1968 to 1972. He went 2–4 with a walk, three runs scored and two RBI to open the season in Baltimore's 11–3 victory over the Angels. On April 19, 2024, he hit his first career grand slam off Kansas City Royals reliever Will Smith. He homered from both sides of the plate for the first time in his MLB career in a 6–5 away loss to the Blue Jays on June 6. The first was a one-out solo homer off Yusei Kikuchi in the sixth inning, the second a two-out two-run shot off Zach Pop in the eighth. He achieved a career-high six RBI in a 9–2 away win over the Tampa Bay Rays three days later on June 9. Four of the runs he drove in came on his second career grand slam off Phil Maton with two outs in the eighth.

He was elected as the AL's starting catcher in the 2024 MLB All-Star Game. With 16 home runs and a .780 OPS in 90 games prior to the Midsummer Classic, he hit .207 with three homers and a .585 OPS in 234 plate appearances over his final 58 regular-season games and was 1-for-8 in the Orioles' AL Wild Card Series loss to the Royals.

==== 2025 ====
Rutschman in 2025

Rutschman's 2025 campaign was limited to 90 games due to a pair of oblique strains that sent him to the injured list (IL) for the first two times in his MLB career. He batted .227 with nine doubles, one triple, eight home runs, 20 RBI and a .691 OPS in 68 games before a left oblique strain sidelined him on 21 June. He hit .340 (17-for-50) with two doubles, three homers, five RBIs and a .964 OPS during a 13-game stretch in the three weeks just prior to the injury. He was placed on the IL again due to a right oblique strain on 21 August. He hit .227 with seven doubles, one homer, nine RBI and a .657 OPS in 17 matches between both IL stints. He finished the season batting .220 with a .673 OPS.

==== 2026 ====
On April 30, 2026, Rutschman hit a grand slam off of Steven Okert of the Houston Astros, helping fuel the Orioles to a 10–3 victory. He was placed on the 7–day concussion IL on June 18, after being struck in the head by an errant throw from Seattle Mariners shortstop Colt Emerson. In July, Rutschman was elected to his third All-Star game. On July 20, Rutschman was placed on the injured list with left wrist inflammation, his third trip to the injured list in 2026. Rutschman appeared in 67 games with the Orioles, batting .251 with a .764 OPS.

=== Boston Red Sox (2026–present) ===
On August 3, 2026, the Orioles traded Rutschman, Jake Rogers, and cash considerations to the Boston Red Sox in exchange for Enddy Azócar, Anthony Eyanson, Carlos Narváez, Kyson Witherspoon, and Harold Rivas. On August 11, Rutschman was activated from the injured list for his team debut. On September 3, he faced his former team, the Orioles, and hit a home run in his first at–bat against them. He was also the first player in MLB history to record a multi–home run game for both sides of the same season matchup. In 32 games with the Red Sox, he batted .222 with a .688 OPS. In the Red Sox AL Wild Card Series, he went 1-8 as the Red Sox got eliminated by the New York Yankees.

== Personal life ==
His grandfather, Ad Rutschman, was a football and baseball coach at Linfield College and is a member of the National Football Foundation College Hall of Fame.

Rutschman's nickname "Rooster" came from his inspiration to grow a mustache like the fictional character Lt. Bradley "Rooster" Bradshaw from the film Top Gun: Maverick.

In an interview in 2020, Rutschman stated that growing up, he was initially a fan of the New York Yankees, noting that "fellow Oregon native" Scott Brosius, played for them. He later supported the St. Louis Cardinals for a short time. He later became a fan of the Seattle Mariners, citing them as the closest thing to a local team.
