= Butch Davis (outfielder, born 1958) =

American baseball player & coach (born 1958)

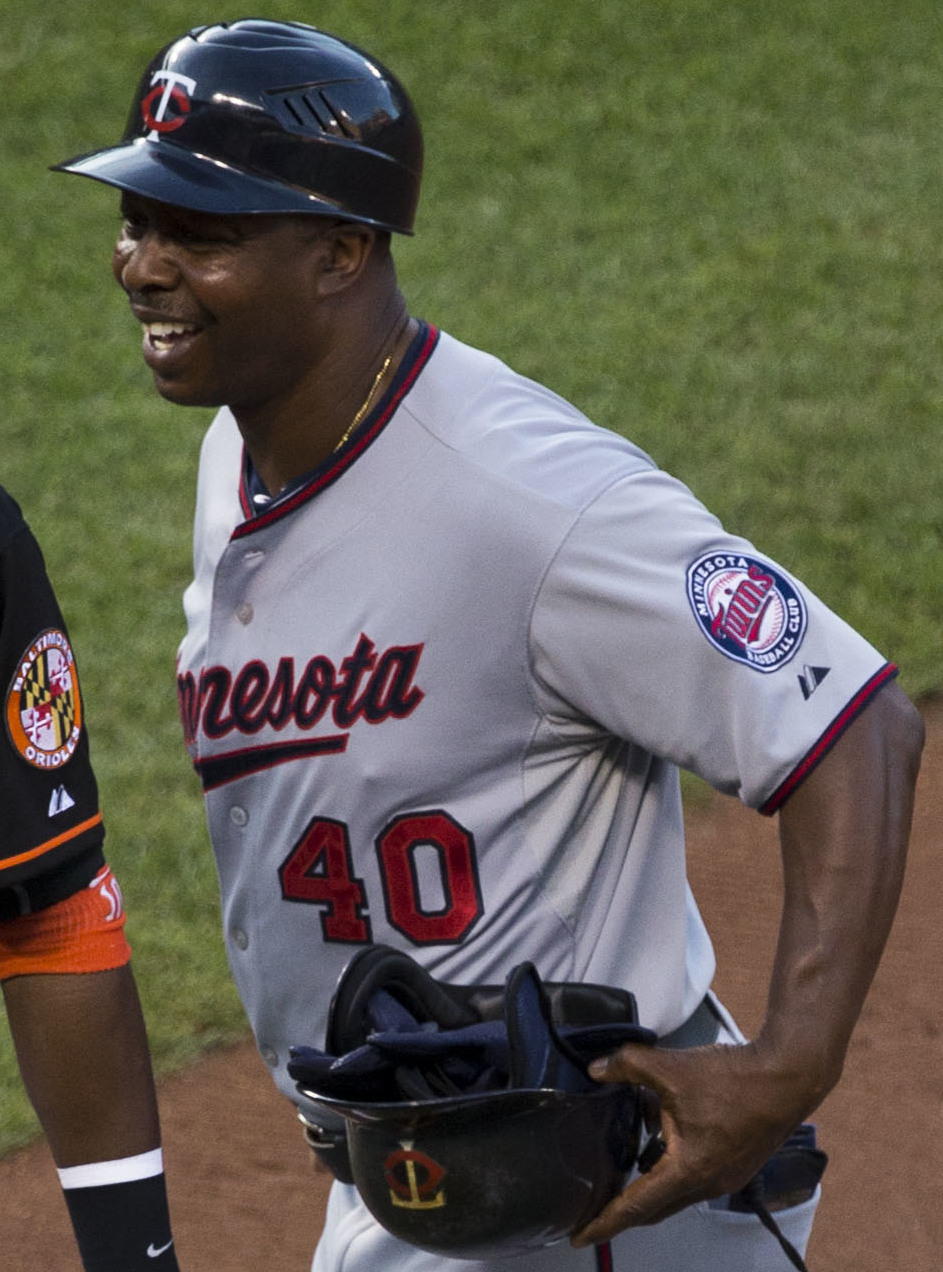
- Davis with the Minnesota Twins in 2015
- Outfielder
- Born: June 19, 1958 (age 67); Williamston, North Carolina, U.S.
- Batted: Right Threw: Right

MLB debut
- August 23, 1983, for the Kansas City Royals

Last MLB appearance
- July 31, 1994, for the Texas Rangers

MLB statistics
- Batting average: .243
- Home runs: 7
- Runs batted in: 50
- Stats at Baseball Reference

Teams
- Kansas City Royals (1983–1984); Pittsburgh Pirates (1987); Baltimore Orioles (1988–1989); Los Angeles Dodgers (1991); Texas Rangers (1993–1994)

Wallace McArthur "Butch" Davis (born June 19, 1958) is an American former professional baseball outfielder and current coach. He played in Major League Baseball (MLB) from 1983 through 1994.

== Playing career ==
During his active career, Davis played for five different teams in parts of eight seasons spanning 1983–1994. Listed at 6 feet (1.8 m) tall and 185 pounds (84 kg), Davis batted and threw right-handed. He was born in Martin County, North Carolina.

Davis was selected by the Kansas City Royals in the 12th round of the 1980 MLB draft out of East Carolina University in Greenville, North Carolina.

He started his majors career with the Royals in 1983, playing for them through 1984 before joining the Pittsburgh Pirates (1987), Baltimore Orioles (1988–1989), Los Angeles Dodgers (1991) and Texas Rangers (1993–1994).

Davis had a promising debut, hitting a .344/.359/.508 slash line (BA/OBP/SLG) with 62 total bases in 33 games, but never again came close to matching those numbers in his next seven seasons.

Davis also played 13 seasons in the Minor Leagues, batting a combined .297/.346/.456 line with 291 stolen bases in 1440 games.

In between, Davis played winter ball with the Leones del Caracas club of the Venezuelan League during the 1991–1992 season.

== Coaching career ==
Following his playing career, Davis has been a long-time hitting coach in the Orioles minors system, mainly at Double-A Bowie Baysox (2000; 2003–2005; 2013–2014), as well as a roving outfield and bunting instructor in the farm system (2007–2012). Additionally, he managed the Gulf Coast League Orioles (1997–1998) and Class-A Delmarva Shorebirds (1999).

On December 1, 2014, Davis was named first base coach of the Minnesota Twins on the staff of 2015 Twins' manager Paul Molitor. He was fired after the 2016 season.

Davis was hired to be the hitting coach for the Orioles AAA affiliate Norfolk Tides for the 2018 season. He was named the fundamentals coach for the Bowie Baysox prior to the 2020 season.

== Personal ==
Davis is married with two children and currently lives in Garner, North Carolina.

He made a brief cameo appearance in the 1988 baseball film Bull Durham, starring Kevin Costner, Tim Robbins and Susan Sarandon.

Preceded by Scott Ullger	Minnesota Twins first base coach 2015–2016	Succeeded by Jeff Davis
