= Baltimore Orioles minor league players =

Below are select minor league players and the rosters of the minor league affiliates of the Baltimore Orioles:

== Players ==
=== Ethan Anderson ===
Ethan Anderson

Baltimore Orioles
- Catcher / First baseman
- Born: September 21, 2003 (age 23); Honolulu, Hawaii, U.S.
- Bats: Switch Throws: Right

Ethan Frederick Anderson (born September 21, 2003) is an American professional baseball catcher and first baseman in the Baltimore Orioles organization.

Anderson attended Frank W. Cox High School in Virginia Beach, Virginia and played college baseball at the University of Virginia for the Virginia Cavaliers. In 2023, he played collegiate summer baseball with the Harwich Mariners of the Cape Cod Baseball League. He was selected by the Baltimore Orioles in the second round of the 2024 Major League Baseball draft.

Anderson spent his first professional season with the Delmarva Shorebirds and Aberdeen IronBirds. He played 2025 with Aberdeen and the Chesapeake Baysox and after the season played in the Arizona Fall League. Anderson started 2026 with Chesapeake.

- Career statistics from Baseball Reference (Minors)

=== Micah Ashman ===
Micah Ashman

Baltimore Orioles
- Pitcher
- Born: August 22, 2002 (age 24); Salt Lake City, Utah, U.S.
- Bats: Left Throws: Left

Micah John Ashman (born August 22, 2002) is an American professional baseball pitcher in the Baltimore Orioles organization. He was named to the Canada national baseball team for the 2026 World Baseball Classic.

Ashman attended Jordan High School in Sandy, Utah, and played college baseball at the University of Utah for the Utes. He is Utah's leader in career saves with twenty. As a junior for Utah in 2024, he made 24 relief appearances and went 1–4 with a 3.08 ERA and 11 saves. He briefly played in the Cape Cod Baseball League with the Chatham Anglers after the season.

Ashman was selected by the Detroit Tigers in the 11th round of the 2024 Major League Baseball draft. He signed with the team and made his professional debut with the Lakeland Flying Tigers, making five relief appearances. Ashman was selected to Detroit's Spring Breakout roster during 2025 spring training. He opened the 2025 season with the West Michigan Whitecaps and was promoted to the Erie SeaWolves in July.

On July 31, 2025, Ashman was traded to the Baltimore Orioles in exchange for Charlie Morton. He was assigned to the Chesapeake Baysox. Over 43 relief appearances between West Michigan, Erie and Chesapeake, Ashman went 4–4 with a 2.35 ERA and 73 strikeouts over 57 1/3 innings. He returned to Chesapeake for the 2026 season and had a 2–2 record, a 1.79 ERA, and 81 strikeouts across 50 1/3 innings. He also made one rehab appearance for the Frederick Keys.

- Career statistics from Baseball Reference (Minors)
- Utah Utes bio

=== Enddy Azócar ===
Enddy Azócar

Baltimore Orioles
- Outfielder
- Born: February 24, 2007 (age 19); Puerto La Cruz, Venezuela
- Bats: Right Throws: Right

Enddy Alexander Azócar (born February 24, 2007) is a Venezuelan professional baseball outfielder in the Baltimore Orioles organization.

Azócar signed with the Boston Red Sox as an international free agent in January 2024. He made his professional debut that year with the Dominican Summer League Red Sox.

Azócar played 2025 with the Florida Complex League Red Sox and Salem Red Sox and started 2026 with Salem before being promoted to the Greenville Drive.

On August 3, 2026, the Red Sox traded Azócar, Carlos Narváez, Anthony Eyanson, Kyson Witherspoon, and Harold Rivas to the Baltimore Orioles in exchange for Adley Rutschman, Jake Rogers, and cash considerations.

- Career statistics from Baseball Reference (Minors)

=== Boston Bateman ===
Boston Bateman

Baltimore Orioles
- Pitcher
- Born: September 20, 2005 (age 21); Henderson, Nevada, U.S.
- Bats: Right Throws: Left

Boston Johansen Bateman (born September 20, 2005) is an American professional baseball pitcher in the Baltimore Orioles organization.

Bateman attended Adolfo Camarillo High School in Camarillo, California, where he played baseball. As a senior in 2024, he went 11–1 with a 0.54 ERA and 130 strikeouts alongside batting .341 with seven home runs. After the season, Bateman was selected by the San Diego Padres in the second round with the 52nd overall pick in the 2024 Major League Baseball draft. He signed with the team for $2.5 million, forgoing his commitment to play college baseball at LSU.

Bateman made his professional debut in 2025 with the Single-A Lake Elsinore Storm.

On July 31, 2025, Bateman (alongside Tyson Neighbors, Tanner Smith, Brandon Butterworth, Victor Figueroa and Cobb Hightower) was traded to the Baltimore Orioles in exchange for Ramón Laureano and Ryan O'Hearn. He was assigned to the Single-A Delmarva Shorebirds and was promoted to the High-A Aberdeen IronBirds after two starts. Bateman started a total of 20 games for the 2025 season and went 5–5 with a 4.14 ERA and 94 strikeouts over 87 innings. He was assigned to the High-A Frederick Keys for the 2026 season. Bateman was named the Orioles Minor League Pitcher of the Month for May after he pitched to a 0.89 ERA across 20 1/3 innings during the month. For the season, he pitched in 24 games (making 21 starts) with Frederick and had a 4–3 record, a 3.65 ERA, and 117 strikeouts over 86 1/3 innings.

- Career statistics from Baseball Reference (Minors)

=== Braxton Bragg ===
Braxton Bragg

Baltimore Orioles
- Pitcher
- Born: October 28, 2000 (age 26); Kansas City, Missouri, U.S.
- Bats: Right Throws: Right

Braxton Kirk Bragg (born October 28, 2000) is an American professional baseball pitcher in the Baltimore Orioles organization.

Bragg attended Liberty High School in Liberty, Missouri and played three years of college baseball at the University of Nebraska–Lincoln, and one year at Dallas Baptist University. In his lone year at Dallas Baptist in 2023, Bragg started 16 games and went 9–2 with a 4.19 ERA over 86 innings. After the season, he was selected by the Baltimore Orioles in the eighth round of the 2023 Major League Baseball draft. He signed for $100,000.

After signing with the Orioles, Bragg made his professional debut with the Delmarva Shorebirds, pitching 6 2/3 innings. He returned to Delmarva for the 2024 season, going 5–6 with a 3.36 ERA and 122 strikeouts over 96 1/3 innings. To open the 2025 season, Bragg was assigned to the Aberdeen Ironbirds. After three starts in which he did not allow an earned run, he was promoted to the Chesapeake Baysox in late April. Bragg was placed on the injured list twice during the season with a forearm injury. On July 30, 2025, he underwent Tommy John surgery, effectively ending his season. Over 12 games (11 starts) for the 2025 season, Bragg went 4–2 with a 1.68 ERA and 77 strikeouts over 59 innings. He was named the Orioles' 12th-best prospect at the end of 2025.

Bragg did not make an appearance in 2026 while recovering from surgery. He was assigned to play in the Arizona Fall League with the Peoria Javelinas following the end of the minor league season and was named to the Fall Stars Game. On November 17, 2026, the Orioles added Bragg to the 40-man roster to protect him from the Rule 5 draft.

- Career statistics from Baseball Reference (Minors)
- Nebraska Cornhuskers bio
- Dallas Baptist Patriots bio

=== Trace Bright ===
Trace Bright

Baltimore Orioles
- Pitcher
- Born: October 26, 2000 (age 26); Montgomery, Alabama, U.S.
- Bats: Right Throws: Right

Bob Ike Bright (born October 26, 2000) is an American professional baseball pitcher in the Baltimore Orioles organization.

Bright attended Trinity Presbyterian School in Montgomery, Alabama and played college baseball at Auburn University. He was drafted by the Baltimore Orioles in the fifth round of the 2022 Major League Baseball draft.

Bright signed with the Orioles and spent his first professional season with the Florida Complex League Orioles and Delmarva Shorebirds. He pitched 2023 with the Aberdeen IronBirds and Bowie Baysox.

- Career statistics from Baseball Reference (Minors)
- Auburn Tigers bio

=== Joseph Dzierwa ===
Joseph Dzierwa

Baltimore Orioles
- Pitcher
- Born: April 21, 2004 (age 22); Toledo, Ohio, U.S.
- Bats: Right Throws: Left

Joseph Wesley Dzierwa (/ˈdʒɜːrwə/ JUR-wə; born April 21, 2004) is an American professional baseball pitcher in the Baltimore Orioles organization.

Dzierwa attended Otsego High School in Tontogany, Ohio, and played college baseball at Michigan State University for the Spartans. In 2024, he played collegiate summer baseball with the Hyannis Harbor Hawks of the Cape Cod Baseball League. After his sophomore year at Michigan State in 2024, he entered the transfer portal and committed to Vanderbilt University, but later rescinded his commitment and returned to the Spartans for his junior year. As a junior at Michigan State in 2025, Dzierwa started 15 games and went 8–3 with a 2.36 ERA and 104 strikeouts. After the season, he was selected by the Baltimore Orioles in the second round of the 2025 Major League Baseball draft. He signed with the team for $1.5 million.

Dzierwa was named to Baltimore's Spring Breakout roster during 2026 spring training and was named to the MLB All-Spring Breakout team. He made his professional debut in 2026 with the High-A Frederick Keys. Over eight starts with Frederick, Dzierwa had a 5–1 record with a 2.21 ERA before he was promoted to the Double-A Chesapeake Baysox in mid-May. He was selected to represent the Orioles at the 2026 All-Star Futures Game alongside Ike Irish. Dzierwa pitched in 18 games for Chesapeake and had a 4–1 record, a 2.29 ERA, and 99 strikeouts over 90 1/3 innings. His totals for the season with both Frederick and Chesapeake included a 9–2 record, a 2.27 ERA, and 149 strikeouts across 131 innings and 26 games. His 2.27 ERA was second lowest in the minor leagues, and his walks plus hits per inning pitched (WHIP) of 0.90 was first. He was named the Orioles’ Minor League Pitcher of the Year for 2026.

- Career statistics from Baseball Reference (Minors)
- Michigan State Spartans bio

=== Payton Eeles ===
Payton Eeles

Baltimore Orioles
- Infielder
- Born: November 16, 1999 (age 27); Scottsdale, Arizona, U.S.
- Bats: Left Throws: Right

Payton Lee Eeles (born November 16, 1999) is an American professional baseball infielder in the Baltimore Orioles organization.

Eeles attended Allatoona High School in Acworth, Georgia, and played college baseball at Cedarville University and Coastal Carolina University. After going undrafted in 2023, he signed with the Chicago Dogs of the American Association of Professional Baseball. In 2024, he played in six games for the Southern Maryland Blue Crabs of the Atlantic League of Professional Baseball (ALPB) before having his contract purchased by the Minnesota Twins.

Eeles started his Twins career with the Fort Myers Mighty Mussels before being promoted to the Cedar Rapids Kernels and St. Paul Saints.

In 2025, Eeles made 99 appearances split between St. Paul, Cedar Rapids, and Fort Myers, slashing a combined .261/.382/.332 with four home runs, 34 RBIs, and 27 stolen bases.

On November 21, 2025, Eeles was traded to the Baltimore Orioles in exchange for Alex Jackson.

- Career statistics from Baseball Reference (Minors)
- Cedarville Yellow Jackets bio
- Coastal Carolina Chanticleers bio

=== Aron Estrada ===
Aron Estrada

Baltimore Orioles
- Second baseman / Outfielder
- Born: January 13, 2005 (age 21); Caja Seca, Venezuela
- Bats: Switch Throws: Right

Aron De Jesus Estrada (born January 13, 2005) is a Venezuelan professional baseball second baseman and outfielder for the Baltimore Orioles of Major League Baseball (MLB).

Estrada signed with the Baltimore Orioles as an international free agent in January 2022. He made his professional debut that season with the Dominican Summer League Orioles. He played 2023 with the Florida Complex League Orioles and 2024 with the Delmarva Shorebirds and Aberdeen IronBirds.

Estrada played 2025 with Aberdeen and the Chesapeake Baysox. The Orioles invited him to spring training in 2026.

On November 17, 2026, He had his contract selected to the 40-man roster to protect him from the Rule 5 draft.

- Career statistics from Baseball Reference (Minors)

=== Victor Figueroa ===
Victor Figueroa

Baltimore Orioles
- First baseman
- Born: December 31, 2003 (age 22); New Port Richey, Florida, U.S.
- Bats: Left Throws: Right

Victor Enrique Figueroa (born December 31, 2003) is an American professional first baseman in the Baltimore Orioles organization.

Figueroa attended River Ridge High School in New Port Richey, Florida and played college baseball at Mississippi Valley State University and Florida SouthWestern State College. He was selected by the San Diego Padres in the 18th round of the 2024 Major League Baseball draft. He made his professional debut that year with the Arizona Complex League Padres and was later promoted to the Lake Elsinore Storm.

On July 31, 2025, the Padres traded Figueroa, Boston Bateman, Tyson Neighbors, Tanner Smith, Brandon Butterworth, and Cobb Hightower to the Baltimore Orioles for Ramón Laureano and Ryan O'Hearn. He started his Orioles career with the Aberdeen IronBirds. He started 2026 with the Frederick Keys.

- Career statistics from Baseball Reference (Minors)

=== Michael Forret ===
Michael Forret

Baltimore Orioles
- Pitcher
- Born: April 6, 2004 (age 22); Matthews, North Carolina, U.S.
- Bats: Left Throws: Right

Michael Steven Forret (born April 6, 2004) is an American professional baseball pitcher for the Baltimore Orioles of Major League Baseball (MLB).

Forret attended Providence High School in Charlotte, North Carolina and played college baseball at State College of Florida, Manatee–Sarasota. In 2023, he played collegiate summer baseball with the Falmouth Commodores of the Cape Cod Baseball League. He was selected by the Baltimore Orioles in the 14th round of the 2023 Major League Baseball draft.

Forret spent his first professional season in 2024 with the Delmarva Shorebirds and Aberdeen IronBirds, accumulating a 6–8 record and 3.88 ERA with 124 strikeouts in 99 2/3 innings pitched across 26 appearances (17 starts).

On December 19, 2025, the Orioles traded Forret (alongside Austin Overn, Slater de Brun, and Caden Bodine) to the Tampa Bay Rays in exchange for Shane Baz. Forret was assigned to the Montgomery Biscuits to begin the 2026 season and was promoted to the Durham Bulls in June.

On August 3, 2026, the Rays traded Forret back to the Baltimore Orioles in exchange for Tyler Wells. On November 17, 2026, He had his contract selected to the 40-man roster to protect him from the Rule 5 draft.

- Career statistics from Baseball Reference (Minors)
- SCF Manatees bio

=== Zach Fruit ===
Zach Fruit

Baltimore Orioles
- Pitcher
- Born: April 12, 2000 (age 26); Ypsilanti, Michigan, U.S.
- Bats: Right Throws: Right

Zachary Tyler Fruit (born April 12, 2000) is an American professional baseball pitcher in the Baltimore Orioles organization.

Fruit attended Dundee High School in Dundee, Michigan and played college baseball at Lansing Community College, Eastern Michigan University and Troy University. In 2021, he played collegiate summer baseball with the Cotuit Kettleers of the Cape Cod Baseball League. He was selected by the Baltimore Orioles in the ninth round of the 2023 Major League Baseball draft.

Fruit made his professional debut in 2024 with the Aberdeen IronBirds. He started 2025 with the Chesapeake Baysox.

- Career statistics from Baseball Reference (Minors)
- Lansing CC Stars bio
- Eastern Michigan Eagles bio
- Troy Trojans bio

=== Nate George ===
Nate George

Baltimore Orioles
- Outfielder
- Born: June 4, 2006 (age 20); Joliet, Illinois, U.S.
- Bats: Right Throws: Right

Nathan Justin George (born June 4, 2006) is an American professional baseball outfielder in the Baltimore Orioles organization.

George attended Minooka High School in Minooka, Illinois, where he played baseball and competed in track and field. As a senior in 2024, he hit .404 with nine home runs and 22 stolen bases. After his senior year, he was selected by the Baltimore Orioles in the 16th round of the 2024 Major League Baseball draft. He signed with the team for $455,000, forgoing his commitment to play college baseball at Northwest Florida State College.

George made his professional debut in 2025 with the Rookie-level Florida Complex League Orioles, where he hit .383 with three home runs and 13 stolen bases over 23 games. In June, he was promoted to the Single-A Delmarva Shorebirds, with whom he batted .337 with one home run, 21 RBIs, and 25 stolen bases over 43 games. He was promoted once again to the High-A Aberdeen IronBirds in August. Over 21 games with Aberdeen to end his first professional season, George hit .291 with one home run, seven RBIs, and 12 stolen bases. In total for the 2025 season, George played 87 games and slashed .337/.413/.483 with five home runs, 42 RBIs, and 50 stolen bases. The Orioles named George their Minor League Player of the Year. Following the 2025 season, George was considered a top prospect and ranked #78 on The Athletic's Top 100 prospects list.

George was assigned to the High-A Frederick Keys to open the 2026 season. On May 7, he was placed on the injured list with an undisclosed medical issue and missed the remainder of the season. Across 20 games with Frederick for the year, he hit .293 with one home run, eight RBI, and 15 stolen bases.

- Career statistics from Baseball Reference (Minors)

=== Nestor German ===
Nestor German

Baltimore Orioles
- Pitcher
- Born: February 26, 2002 (age 24); Seattle, Washington, U.S.
- Bats: Right Throws: Right

Nestor German (born February 26, 2002) is an American professional baseball pitcher for the Baltimore Orioles of Major League Baseball (MLB).

German attended Chief Sealth International High School in Seattle, Washington and played college baseball at Seattle University. He was selected by the Baltimore Orioles in the 11th round of the 2023 Major League Baseball draft.

German spent his first professional season in 2024 with the Delmarva Shorebirds and Aberdeen IronBirds. He pitched 2025 with Aberdeen, Chesapeake Baysox and Norfolk Tides. He opened the 2026 season with Norfolk.

On November 17, 2026, He had his contract selected to the 40-man roster to protect him from the Rule 5 draft.

- Career statistics from Baseball Reference (Minors)

=== Caden Hunter ===
Caden Hunter

Baltimore Orioles
- Pitcher
- Born: October 16, 2003 (age 23); Sacramento, California, U.S.
- Bats: Right Throws: Left

Caden Marc Hunter (born October 16, 2003) is an American professional baseball pitcher in the Baltimore Orioles organization.

Hunter attended Granite Bay High School in Granite Bay, California and played the 2023 and 2024 college baseball seasons at Sierra College. He then transferred to the University of Southern California where he played the 2025 season for the USC Trojans. He appeared in 16 games (making 14 starts) for USC in 2025 and went 6–6 with a 5.50 ERA and 79 strikeouts across 70 1/3 innings.

Hunter was selected by the Baltimore Orioles in the sixth round of the 2025 Major League Baseball draft. Hunter made his professional debut in 2026 with the Single-A Delmarva Shorebirds and was promoted to the High-A Frederick Keys in May. In July, he was promoted to the Double-A Chesapeake Baysox. Hunter pitched in 23 games (making 21 starts) between the three teams and went 5–3 with a 2.01 ERA and 151 strikeouts over 103 innings.

- Career statistics from Baseball Reference (Minors)
- USC Trojans bio

=== Jaiden Lo Re ===
Jaiden Lo Re

Baltimore Orioles
- Infielder
- Born: February 10, 2007 (age 19); Scottsdale, Arizona, U.S.
- Bats: Right Throws: Right

Jaiden Lo Re (born February 10, 2007) is an American professional baseball infielder in the Baltimore Orioles organization.

Lo Re attended Corona del Sol High School in Tempe, Arizona. He was selected by the Baltimore Orioles in the fifth round of the 2025 Major League Baseball draft.

Lo Re made his professional debut in 2026 with the Florida Complex League Orioles and was promoted to the Delmarva Shorebirds during the season.

- Career statistics from Baseball Reference (Minors)

=== Esteban Mejía ===
Esteban Mejía

Baltimore Orioles
- Pitcher
- Born: March 7, 2007 (age 19); Villa Altagracia, Dominican Republic
- Bats: Right Throws: Right

Esteban Mejía (born March 7, 2007) is a Dominican professional baseball pitcher in the Baltimore Orioles organization.

Mejía signed with the Baltimore Orioles as an international free agent on January 15, 2024. He made his professional debut that season with the Dominican Summer League Orioles.

Mejía started the 2025 season with the rookie-level Florida Complex League Orioles and was promoted to the Single-A Delmarva Shorebirds during the season.

- Career statistics from Baseball Reference (Minors)

=== Brock Moore ===
Brock Moore

Baltimore Orioles
- Pitcher
- Born: May 17, 2000 (age 26); Indianapolis, Indiana, U.S.
- Bats: Right Throws: Right

Brock Nicholas Moore (born May 17, 2000) is an American professional baseball pitcher in the Baltimore Orioles organization.

Moore attended University High School of Indiana in Carmel, Indiana and played college baseball at Danville Area Community College, Menlo College and the University of Oregon. He was selected by the Seattle Mariners in the seventh round of the 2024 Major League Baseball draft. He made his professional debut that year with the Modesto Nuts.

Moore pitched 2025 with the Everett AquaSox and started 2026 with Everett before being promoted to the Arkansas Travelers. On August 3, 2026, the Mariners traded Moore, Harrison Kreiling, and Alex Hoppe to the Baltimore Orioles in exchange for outfielder Taylor Ward.

- Career statistics from Baseball Reference (Minors)

=== Tyson Neighbors ===
Tyson Neighbors

Baltimore Orioles
- Pitcher
- Born: October 9, 2002 (age 24); Sulphur Springs, Texas, U.S.
- Bats: Right Throws: Right

Tyson Neighbors (born October 9, 2002) is an American professional baseball pitcher in the Baltimore Orioles organization.

Neighbors attended Royse City High School in Royse City, Texas, where he played baseball. As a senior in 2021, he batted .500 with 11 home runs alongside striking out 52 batters over 21 innings. Unselected in the 2021 Major League Baseball draft, Neighbors enrolled at Kansas State University where he played college baseball for the Wildcats.

As a freshman at Kansas State in 2022, Neighbors appeared in nine games and had a 5.40 earned run average (ERA) and 13 strikeouts across 8 1/3 innings. After the season, he played collegiate summer baseball with the Mankato MoonDogs of the Northwoods League. In 2023 for Kansas State, he appeared in 25 games and pitched to a 5–1 record, a 1.85 ERA, 86 strikeouts, and 11 saves. That summer, he was named to the United States national baseball team alongside Wildcat teammate Kaelen Culpepper. As a junior for Kansas State in 2024, Neighbors made 22 relief appearances and went 1–2 with a 3.96 ERA, 61 strikeouts, and nine saves over 38 2/3 innings. After the season, he was selected by the San Diego Padres in the fourth round of the 2024 Major League Baseball draft. He signed for $600,000.

Neighbors made his professional debut with the Single-A Lake Elsinore Storm, posting a 3.86 ERA with nine strikeouts over four appearances. He was assigned to the High-A Fort Wayne TinCaps to open the 2025 season. In June, Neighbors was promoted to the Double-A San Antonio Missions.

On July 31, 2025, Neighbors (alongside Boston Bateman, Tanner Smith, Brandon Butterworth, Victor Figueroa and Cobb Hightower) was traded to the Baltimore Orioles in exchange for Ramón Laureano and Ryan O'Hearn. He was assigned to the Double-A Chesapeake Baysox. Over 44 relief appearances between Fort Wayne, San Antonio, and Chesapeake, Neighbors went 5–0 with a 1.53 ERA, 83 strikeouts, and 22 walks over 59 innings. Neighbors returned to Chesapeake to start the 2026 season and also played with the High-A Frederick Keys. Across 33 appearances between both teams, he had a 1–5 record, an 8.82 ERA, 57 strikeouts, and 35 walks over 33 2/3 innings.

- Career statistics from MLB · Baseball Reference (Minors)
- Kansas State Wildcats bio

=== Braden Nett ===
Braden Nett

Baltimore Orioles
- Pitcher
- Born: June 18, 2002 (age 24); Troy, Missouri, U.S.
- Bats: Right Throws: Right

Braden Nett (born June 18, 2002) is an American professional baseball pitcher for the Baltimore Orioles of Major League Baseball (MLB).

Nett attended Troy Buchanan High School in Troy, Missouri and played college baseball at St. Charles Community College. He signed with the San Diego Padres as an undrafted agent in 2022. He made his professional debut that season with the rookie-level Arizona Complex League Padres.

Nett spent 2023 with the ACL Padres and Lake Elsinore Storm and after the season pitched for the Peoria Javelinas in the Arizona Fall League. He pitched 2024 with the Fort Wayne TinCaps and San Antonio Missions.

On July 31, 2025, the Padres traded Nett, Eduarniel Núñez, Leo De Vries, and Henry Báez to the Athletics in exchange for Mason Miller and JP Sears. He made seven starts down the stretch for the Double-A Midland RockHounds, logging a 1-3 record and 4.60 ERA with 30 strikeouts across 31 1/3 innings pitched. On November 18, the Athletics added Nett to their 40-man roster to protect him from the Rule 5 draft.

Nett was optioned to the Triple-A Las Vegas Aviators to begin the 2026 season.

On November 19, Nett was claimed off waivers by the Baltimore Orioles.

- Career statistics from Baseball Reference (Minors)

=== Alex Pham ===
Alex Pham

Baltimore Orioles
- Pitcher
- Born: October 9, 1999 (age 27); Union City, California, U.S.
- Bats: Right Throws: Right

Alexander Jianjiang Pham (born October 9, 1999) is an American professional baseball pitcher in the Baltimore Orioles organization.

Pham attended Moreau Catholic High School in Hayward, California, and played college baseball at the University of San Francisco. He was drafted by the Baltimore Orioles in the 19th round of the 2021 Major League Baseball draft.

Pham spent his first professional season with the Florida Complex League Orioles and Delmarva Shorebirds. He pitched 2022 with the Florida Complex Orioles, Delmarva and the Aberdeen IronBirds. He started 2023 with Aberdeen before being promoted to the Bowie Baysox.

- Career statistics from Baseball Reference (Minors)
- San Francisco Dons bio

=== JT Quinn ===
JT Quinn

Baltimore Orioles
- Pitcher
- Born: April 22, 2004 (age 22); Tampa, Florida, U.S.
- Bats: Right Throws: Right

Jonathan Thomas Quinn (born April 22, 2004) is an American professional baseball pitcher in the Baltimore Orioles organization.

Quinn attended Berkeley Preparatory School in Tampa, Florida and played college baseball at the University of Mississippi and the University of Georgia. As a sophomore at Ole Miss, he totaled an 8.84 ERA in 11 appearances, before transferring to Georgia. During his junior year in 2025, Quinn made 17 appearances and accumulated a 2.75 ERA and 49 strikeouts over 36 innings pitched. That summer, he briefly played in the Cape Cod Baseball League with the Chatham Anglers. Quinn was selected by the Baltimore Orioles in the second round of the 2025 Major League Baseball draft. He signed with Baltimore for a $1.15 million bonus.

- Career statistics from MLB · Baseball Reference (Minors)
- Georgia Bulldogs bio

=== Patrick Reilly ===
Patrick Reilly

Baltimore Orioles
- Pitcher
- Born: October 7, 2001 (age 25); Long Branch, New Jersey, U.S.
- Bats: Right Throws: Right

Patrick Michael Reilly (born October 7, 2001) is an American professional baseball pitcher for the Baltimore Orioles of Major League Baseball (MLB).

Reilly attended Christian Brothers Academy in Lincroft, New Jersey and played college baseball at Vanderbilt University. In 2021 and 2022, he played collegiate summer baseball with the Orleans Firebirds of the Cape Cod Baseball League, and returned to the league in 2023 with the Bourne Braves.

Reilly was drafted by the Pittsburgh Pirates in the fifth round, with the 140th overall selection, of the 2023 Major League Baseball draft. He made his professional debut with the Single-A Bradenton Marauders. He began 2024 with the High-A Greensboro Grasshoppers, posting a 5–4 record and 3.38 ERA with 108 strikeouts in 88 innings pitched across 19 starts.

On July 30, 2024, the Pirates traded Reilly to the Baltimore Orioles in exchange for Billy Cook. He spent the remainder of the year with the Double-A Bowie Baysox, logging a 1–1 record and 3.73 ERA with 38 strikeouts in 31 1/3 innings pitched across 8 games (6 starts).

Reilly began the 2025 season with the Double-A Chesapeake Baysox, and posted a 1.86 ERA with eight strikeouts over three starts. On May 15, 2025, Reilly was ruled out for the remainder of the season after undergoing UCL surgery.

On November 17, 2026, He had his contract selected to the 40-man roster to protect him from the Rule 5 draft.

Reilly is a power right-hander with a fastball that routinely sits in the mid-to-upper 90s and can touch 98 mph. His secondary offerings include a tight, high-spin slider and an improving changeup, giving him the potential for a solid three-pitch mix. His strikeout numbers have remained strong throughout college and into pro ball, although inconsistent command has occasionally limited his effectiveness. Evaluators project him as a potential high-leverage reliever or back-end starter, depending on how his command develops post-injury.

- Career statistics from MLB · Baseball Reference (Minors)
- Vanderbilt Commodores bio

=== Reed Trimble ===
Reed Trimble

Baltimore Orioles – No. 62
- Outfielder
- Born: June 6, 2000 (age 26); Tupelo, Mississippi, U.S.
- Bats: Switch Throws: Right

William Reed Trimble (born June 6, 2000) is an American professional baseball outfielder for the Baltimore Orioles of Major League Baseball (MLB).

Trimble was born and grew up in Brandon, Mississippi, and attended Northwest Rankin High School. He played college baseball for the Southern Miss Golden Eagles. As a true freshman in 2020, he batted .275 with 12 RBI before the season was cut short due to the coronavirus pandemic. As a redshirt freshman in 2021, Trimble hit .345 with 17 home runs and tied for the most RBI in NCAA Division I with 72.

Trimble was selected in the Competitive Balance Round B round with the 65th overall pick in the 2021 Major League Baseball draft by the Baltimore Orioles. He signed with the team on July 24, 2021, and received an $800,000 signing bonus. Trimble split his first professional season between the Rookie-level Florida Complex League Orioles and the Low-A East Delmarva Shorebirds, batting .200 over 22 games between the two affiliates. He underwent surgery on his left shoulder following the season's end.

Trimble split the 2025 campaign between the FCL Orioles, High-A Aberdeen IronBirds, Double-A Chesapeake Baysox, and Triple-A Norfolk Tides; in 90 appearances for the four affiliates, he batted a cumulative .259/.342/.486 with 17 home runs, 49 RBI, and 21 stolen bases. On November 18, 2025, the Orioles added Trimble to their 40-man roster to protect him from the Rule 5 draft.

Trimble was optioned to Triple-A Norfolk to begin the 2026 season.

- Southern Miss Golden Eagles bio
- Career statistics from Baseball Reference (Minors)

=== Levi Wells ===
Levi Wells

Baltimore Orioles
- Pitcher
- Born: September 21, 2001 (age 25); Houston, Texas, U.S.
- Bats: Right Throws: Right

Levi Richard Wells (born September 21, 2001) is an American professional baseball pitcher for the Baltimore Orioles of Major League Baseball (MLB).

Wells attended La Porte High School in La Porte, Texas and played college baseball at Texas Tech University and Texas State University. In 2022, he played collegiate summer baseball with the Falmouth Commodores of the Cape Cod Baseball League. He was selected by the Baltimore Orioles in the fourth round of the 2023 Major League Baseball draft.

Wells made his professional debut in 2024 with the Aberdeen IronBirds and started 2025 with the Chesapeake Baysox.

On November 17, 2026, He had his contract selected to the 40-man roster to protect him from the Rule 5 draft.

- Career statistics from Baseball Reference (Minors)

=== Creed Willems ===
Creed Willems

Baltimore Orioles
- Catcher / First baseman
- Born: June 4, 2003 (age 23); Odessa, Texas, U.S.
- Bats: Left Throws: Right

Creed Willems (born June 4, 2003) is an American professional baseball catcher and first baseman in the Baltimore Orioles organization.

Willems attended Aledo High School in Aledo, Texas. He was selected by the Baltimore Orioles in the eighth round of the 2021 Major League Baseball draft. He made his professional debut that year with the Florida Complex League Orioles.

Willems played 2022 with the Delmarva Shorebirds and 2023 with Delmarva and the Aberdeen IronBirds. He played 2024 with Aberdeen and the Bowie Baysox. After the season he played in the Arizona Fall League for the Surprise Saguaros.

- Career statistics from Baseball Reference (Minors)

== Full Triple-A to Rookie League rosters ==
=== Triple-A ===
Norfolk Tides roster
Players		Coaches/Other
Pitchers: -- Carter Baumler; 29 Trace Bright; -- Alex Carrillo; -- Connor Cooke; 43 Jake Dykhoff; 66 Christian Herberholz; 25 Ryan Long; -- Robinson Martínez; 47 Gerald Ogando; -- Elvis Peguero; 26 Alex Pham; -- Jackson Rees; 51 Jayvien Sandridge; 10 Juaron Watts-Brown	Catchers: 28 Ethan Anderson; 4 Silas Ardoin; -- Zach Morgan; 12 Creed Willems; Infielders: -- Jose Barrero; 31 Brandon Butterworth; 5 Payton Eeles; Outfielders: 3 Jud Fabian; 13 Tavian Josenberger; 17 Fernando Peguero; -- Junior Pérez	Manager: 19 Tim Federowicz; Coaches: 22 Felipe Alou Jr. (fundamentals); 46 Billy Facteau (development); 10 Rick Strickland (hitting); 52 Jeff Ware (pitching); 7-day injured list; * On Baltimore Orioles 40-man roster; ~ Development list; # Rehab assignment; ∞ Reserve list; ‡ Restricted list; § Suspended list; † Temporarily inactive list; Roster updated November 19, 2026; Transactions; → More rosters: MiLB • International League; → Baltimore Orioles minor league players

=== Double-A ===
Chesapeake Baysox roster
Players		Coaches/Other
Pitchers: 53 Micah Ashman; 11 Bradley Brehmer; 40 Brandon Downer; 32 Joseph Dzierwa; 18 Anthony Eyanson; -- Zach Fruit; 29 Keagan Gillies; 24 Sebastian Gongora; 26 Andrew Herbert; 14 Caden Hunter; -- Blake Money; 54 Brock Moore; 16 Tyson Neighbors; 33 JT Quinn	Catchers: 27 Dom Keegan; 31 Colin Tuft; Infielders: 1 Wehiwa Aloy; 35 Edwin Amparo; 7 Anderson De Los Santos; 41 Victor Figueroa; 23 Griff O'Ferrall; Outfielders: 2 Vance Honeycutt; 17 Thomas Sosa	Manager: 21 Roberto Mercado; Coaches: 58 Josh Bunselmeyer (hitting); 45 Calvin Christiansen (development); 52 Ryan Goll (fundamentals); 36 Jeremy Hileman (pitching); 7-day injured list; * On Baltimore Orioles 40-man roster; ~ Development list; # Rehab assignment; ∞ Reserve list; ‡ Restricted list; § Suspended list; † Temporarily inactive list; Roster updated November 17, 2026; Transactions; → More rosters: MiLB • Eastern League; → Baltimore Orioles minor league players

=== High-A ===
Frederick Keys roster
Players		Coaches/Other
Pitchers: 26 Cohen Achen; -- Chase Allsup; 50 Boston Bateman; -- Yeiber Cartaya; 54 Jack Crowder; 18 Carson Dorsey; 40 Raimon Gomez; 65 Todd Kniebbe; 47 Harrison Kreiling; 60 Zac Lampton; 19 Kiefer Lord; 44 Chandler Marsh; 13 Twine Palmer; 34 Brendan Parks; 27 Christian Rodriguez; 48 Teddy Sharkey; 51 Isaac Silva; 32 Braeden Sloan; -- Tanner Smith; 31 Stephen Still; 43 Trent Turzenski; 30 Kyson Witherspoon; 53 Ben Vespi; 14 Evan Yates	Catchers: 23 Yasmil Bucce; 64 Andrés Nolaya; 10 Ryan Stafford; Infielders: 38 Leandro Arias; 15 Randal Diaz; 28 DJ Layton; 1 Jaiden Lo Re; 16 Colin Yeaman; Outfielders: 58 Félix Amparo; -- RJ Austin; 35 Enddy Azócar; 46 Elis Cuevas; -- Nate George; 7 Ty Head; -- Ike Irish; 11 Jordan Sanchez; 39 Braylin Tavera; 45 Braylon Whitaker	Manager: 21 Collin Woody; Coaches: 36 Jordie Henry (pitching); 17 Teegan Leader (development); -- Jake Ratz (hitting); 26 Chase Sebby (fundamentals); 7-day injured list; * On Baltimore Orioles 40-man roster; ~ Development list; # Rehab assignment; ∞ Reserve list; ‡ Restricted list; § Suspended list; † Temporarily inactive list; Roster updated November 17, 2026; Transactions; → More rosters: MiLB • South Atlantic League; → Baltimore Orioles minor league players

=== Single-A ===
Delmarva Shorebirds roster
Players		Coaches/Other
Pitchers: -- Hunter Allen; -- Denton Biller; 34 KK Clark; 16 Holden deJong; 1 Connor Gehr; 28 Javier González; 30 Diego Gutierrez; 11 Kailen Hamson; -- J. D. Hennen; 37 Adrian Heredia; 32 Collin McKinney; 22 Esteban Mejía; -- Miguel Mesa; 27 Francisco Morao; -- Keeler Morfe; 17 Dalton Neuschwander; 12 Brayan Orrantia; -- Josiah Romeo; 2 Iziah Salinas; 23 Braden Smith	Catchers: 20 Adriander Mejía; 40 Juan Ortega; 18 Miguel Rodríguez; -- Andrew Tess; Infielders: 21 Luis Almeyda; 6 Jimmy Anderson; 9 Hector Campusano; 19 Elvin Garcia; -- Cobb Hightower; 26 Joshua Liranzo; 7 Jemone Nuel; 38 Carlos Sanchez; Outfielders: 24 Eric Booth Jr.; 4 Stiven Martinez; -- Raylin Ramos; 29 Jhomnardo Reyes	Manager: -- Adonis Smith; Coaches: 36 Casey Buckley (development); -- Aritz Garcia (fundamentals); -- Collin McBride (hitting); -- Bailey Vuylsteke (pitching); 7-day injured list; * On Baltimore Orioles 40-man roster; ~ Development list; # Rehab assignment; ∞ Reserve list; ‡ Restricted list; § Suspended list; † Temporarily inactive list; Roster updated November 17, 2026; Transactions; → More rosters: MiLB • Carolina League; → Baltimore Orioles minor league players

=== Rookie ===
Florida Complex League Orioles roster
Players		Coaches/Other
Pitchers: -- Zane Adams; 26 Salvador Casado; -- Noah Chapman; 35 Luis Espinoza; 55 Andy Fabian; -- Gunnar Garrison; -- Regan Hall; -- Miguel Hugas; -- David Lally Jr.; 45 Esteban Luna; 23 Edwin Marte; -- Harlin Naut; -- Ross Norman; 17 Luis Perdomo; -- Ryan Piech; -- Colton Sampson; 24 Victor Santos; -- Garrison Sumner; 68 Kevin Velasco; -- Dominic Voegele; -- Camden Wicker	Catchers: 13 Christian Astudillo; -- Julio Herrera ‡; -- Leo Marrero; 66 Josnaider Orellana; 9 Omar Urbina; Infielders: -- Junior Aybar; 63 Wilfri De La Cruz; -- Brayden Fry; 32 Saul Gomez; -- Joephillip Guzman; -- José Peña; -- Will Plunkett; 48 Emilio Sanchez; Outfielders: 25 Angel Garcia; 50 Cam Lee; 47 Starlin Mieses; -- Harold Rivas; -- Kevin Roberts Jr.; 37 Lisandro Sanchez	Manager: 12 Christian Frias; Coaches: 98 Zach Cole (hitting); 34 Tanner Cooper (pitching); 19 George Cutler (coach); 46 Andrew Downer (development); 44 Quentin Holmes (development); 30 Jamie Johnson (coach); 99 Alan Kolb (pitching); 16 Ramon Sambo (fundamentals); 97 Jake Welch (hitting); 7-day injured list; * On Baltimore Orioles 40-man roster; ~ Development list; # Rehab assignment; ∞ Reserve list; ‡ Restricted list; § Suspended list; † Temporarily inactive list; Roster updated November 2, 2026; → More rosters: MiLB • Florida Complex League; → Baltimore Orioles minor league players

=== Foreign Rookie ===
Dominican Summer League Orioles Black roster
Players		Coaches/Other
Pitchers: 66 Alberto Arias; 60 Alexander Diaz; 35 Gabriel Fuentes; 85 Enyel Garcia; 67 Roniel Joseph; 88 Maicol Lauriano; -- Victor Padilla; 94 Axel Perez; 23 Deimer Rodriguez; 87 Enmanuel Rodriguez; 93 Christian Rojas; 76 Roldanny Sena; 15 Laurens Sosa; 60 Jonnathan Torres; 48 Pedro Tovar; -- Darling Valencio; 92 Benjamin Vasquez; 19 Darling Villalona; 53 Yunior Villavicencio; 32 Kelvin Zapata	Catchers: 1 Yeison Acosta; 9 Luis Dias; 17 Victor Saez; Infielders: 2 Meykel Baro; 3 Jhostin Berroa; 38 Jesus Gomez; 13 Frandy Guillen; 37 Ruben Hernandez; 43 Railin Tea; 18 Ronald Terrero; Outfielders: 7 Johanse Gomez; 34 Pedro Gomez; 31 Carlos Rubecindo	Manager: -- Elvis Morel; Coaches: -- Devin Fujioka (hitting); -- Miguel Jabalera (fundamentals); -- Dionis Pascual (pitching); -- Noelberth Romero (fundamentals); 7-day injured list; * On Baltimore Orioles 40-man roster; ~ Development list; # Rehab assignment; ∞ Reserve list; ‡ Restricted list; § Suspended list; † Temporarily inactive list; Roster updated November 2, 2026; → More rosters: MiLB • Dominican Summer League; → Baltimore Orioles minor league players

Dominican Summer League Orioles Orange roster
Players		Coaches/Other
Pitchers: -- Xavier Alvero ‡; 71 Asael Arias; 36 Kelvin Cadet; -- Roynel Confidente; 86 Angel De Jesus; 55 Esteban Dicent; -- Dalfy Emmanuel; 83 Roberto Geraldo; 90 Andri Hidalgo; 70 Jainer Marmolejos; 95 David Medina; 99 Junior Medina; 97 Joseph Moschetto; 98 Julio Ozoria; 45 Emmanuel Pena; 73 Henry Ramirez; 69 Anderson Reyes; 91 Marcos Reynoso; 78 Eduin Rodriguez; 74 Scarling Sterling	Catchers: 61 Ricardo Chirinos; 14 Ray Faria; 12 Jose Flores; 6 Manuel Vasquez; Infielders: 29 Jose Luis Acevedo; 41 Jarol Capellan; 21 Maicor Degollado; 16 Jorge Drullard; 10 Roberto Gabot; 39 Yorvis Salazar; Outfielders: 27 Joshddy Castillo; 24 Fabian Cordero; 30 Rayner Herrera; 28 Ariel Roque; 26 Gabriel Rosario	Manager: -- Chris Madera; Coaches: -- Jerry Chavarria (fundamentals); -- John Nowak (pitching); -- Elio Prado (hitting); 7-day injured list; * On Baltimore Orioles 40-man roster; ~ Development list; # Rehab assignment; ∞ Reserve list; ‡ Restricted list; § Suspended list; † Temporarily inactive list; Roster updated November 10, 2026; → More rosters: MiLB • Dominican Summer League; → Baltimore Orioles minor league players

== Player Development Staff ==
The Orioles' Player Development staff consists of:

- Director, Player Development: Anthony Villa
- Upper-Level Instruction: Mike Shildt
- Lower-Level Instruction: Samuel Vega
- Field: Jeff Kunkel
- Infield: Tim DeJohn
- Upper-Level Hitting: Mike Montville
- Lower-Level Hitting: Brink Ambler
- Director, Pitching: Forrest Herrmann
- Pitching: Adam Schuck
- Upper-Level Pitching: Thomas Eshelman
- Manager, Player Development Complexes: Jackson McDonnell
- Complex Pitching Development & Rehab: Cory Popham
- Latin America Field: Chris Madera
- Latin America Pitching: Anderson Tavarez
- Assistant Latin America Pitching: Andres Rodriguez
- Player Development, Hitting Analyst: Richard Cosgrove
- Technology: David Latlip
