= Keagan Gillies =

American baseball player (born 1998)

Baltimore Orioles
- Pitcher
- Born: January 27, 1998 (age 28); Metairie, Louisiana, U.S.
- Bats: Right Throws: Right
- Stats at Baseball Reference

Keagan Michael Gillies (born January 27, 1998) is an American professional baseball pitcher in the Baltimore Orioles organization.

== Amateur career ==
Gillies played college baseball at Tulane University from 2017 to 2021, accumulating a 10 wins and 187 strikeouts in 215 1/3 innings pitched across 79 games (30 starts). In 2018, he played collegiate summer baseball with the Cotuit Kettleers of the Cape Cod Baseball League. Gillies was drafted by the Baltimore Orioles in the 15th round, with the 437th overall selection, of the 2021 Major League Baseball draft.

== Professional career ==
Gillies made his professional debut with the rookie-level Florida Complex League Orioles. Gillies made nine appearances (five starts) split between the FCL Orioles and Single-A Delmarva Shorebirds in 2022, registering a 1-2 record and 4.87 ERA with 22 strikeouts across 20 1/3 innings pitched.

Gillies split the 2023 campaign between the High-A Aberdeen IronBirds and the Double-A Bowie Baysox. In 33 appearances for the two affiliates, he compiled an aggregate 5-1 record and 2.43 ERA with 61 strikeouts and four saves across 40 2/3 innings pitched. Gillies made 42 appearances out of the bullpen for Bowie in 2024, posting a 1-3 record and 4.94 ERA with 54 strikeouts and seven saves across 47 1/3 innings pitched.

Gillies began the 2025 season with the Double-A Chesapeake Baysox, posting a 4-1 record and 1.15 ERA with 34 strikeouts and eight saves across 31 1/3 innings pitched. He was selected to represent the Orioles organization at the 2025 All-Star Futures Game. On July 2, 2025, Gillies was promoted to the Triple-A Norfolk Tides.
