= Jake Rogers (baseball) =

American baseball player (born 1995)

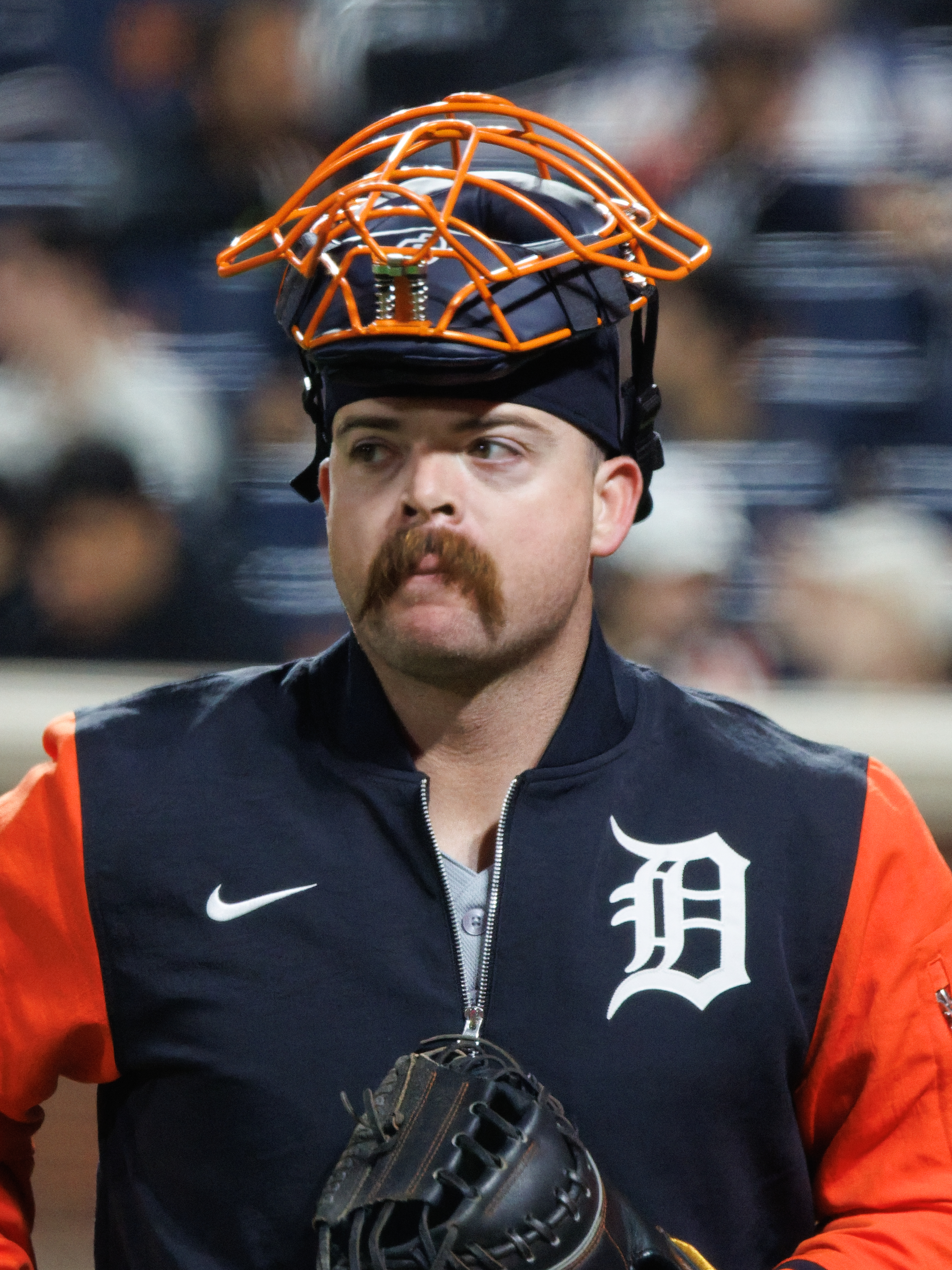
- Rogers with the Tigers in 2026

Free agent
- Catcher
- Born: April 18, 1995 (age 31); Canyon, Texas, U.S.
- Bats: Right Throws: Right

MLB debut
- July 30, 2019, for the Detroit Tigers

MLB statistics (through 2026 season)
- Batting average: .195
- Home runs: 48
- Runs batted in: 143
- Stats at Baseball Reference

Teams
- Detroit Tigers (2019, 2021, 2023–2026); Baltimore Orioles (2026); Boston Red Sox (2026); Chicago White Sox (2026)

Jacob Ray Rogers (born April 18, 1995) is an American professional baseball catcher who is a free agent. He has played in Major League Baseball (MLB) for the Detroit Tigers, Baltimore Orioles, Boston Red Sox, and Chicago White Sox.

== Amateur career ==
Rogers attended Canyon High School in Canyon, Texas, and played for the school's baseball team. In 2013, as a senior, he batted .492 with six home runs and 48 runs batted in (RBI). Undrafted out of high school in the 2013 MLB draft, he enrolled at Tulane University where he played college baseball for the Tulane Green Wave. In 2015, he played collegiate summer baseball with the Hyannis Harbor Hawks of the Cape Cod Baseball League, and was named a league all-star. In 2016, as a junior at Tulane, he hit .261 with seven home runs and 28 RBI over 61 appearances.

== Professional career ==
=== Houston Astros ===
The Houston Astros selected Rogers in the third round (97th overall) of the 2016 Major League Baseball draft. He signed and made his professional debut with the Low-A Tri-City ValleyCats and after batting .253 with two home runs and 12 RBI in 25 games, was later promoted to the Single-A Quad Cities River Bandits where he finished the season, batting .208 in 21 games.

Rogers started the 2017 season with Quad Cities where he posted a .255 batting average with six home runs and 15 RBI and was promoted to the High-A Buies Creek Astros where he greatly improved, posting a .265 average with a career-high 12 home runs and 55 RBI in 83 games.

=== Detroit Tigers ===
On August 31, 2017, the Astros traded Rogers to the Detroit Tigers, along with Franklin Pérez and Daz Cameron, in exchange for Justin Verlander. Detroit then assigned him to the Lakeland Flying Tigers where he played in two games. Rogers spent 2018 with the Erie SeaWolves, hitting .219 with 17 home runs and 56 RBI across 99 games. He returned to Erie to begin 2019 before being promoted to the Toledo Mud Hens. Rogers was named to the 2019 All-Star Futures Game.

On July 30, 2019, the Tigers selected Rogers' contract and promoted him to the major leagues for the first time. He had been hitting .250 split between Double-A Erie and Triple-A Toledo with 14 home runs and 52 RBI, while throwing out 25 of 48 base stealers (52.1%). Rogers played that night and got his first major league hit in the 7th inning, an RBI single off Taylor Cole of the Los Angeles Angels. In the next game on July 31, Rogers hit his first major league home run off the Angels' José Suárez. In 35 games for Detroit, Rogers hit .125 with four home runs. Rogers did not make an appearance for the Tigers in 2020.

Rogers was optioned to the Tigers' alternate training site in Toledo to start the 2021 season. He was recalled to the major league club on May 7. On July 19, Rogers was placed on the 10-day injured list with a forearm strain. On August 18, the Tigers transferred Rogers to the 60-day injured list after the strain did not respond to treatment. On September 8, the Tigers announced Rogers had undergone Tommy John surgery and would miss at least a year. On April 6, 2022, Rogers was placed on the Tigers' 60-day injured list after which he missed the entirety of the 2022 season.

Rogers returned to action in the 2023 season, during which he platooned at catcher with Eric Haase. He appeared in 107 total games, batting .221 with 21 home runs. In the 2024 season, Rogers struggled at the plate, hitting .197 with 10 home runs in 102 games.

On January 9, 2025, Rogers and the Tigers agreed to a one-year, $2.64 million contract, avoiding arbitration. On April 8, Rogers was placed on the 10-day injured list with left oblique tightness. When he returned in late May, he had lost his starting job to Dillon Dingler. In 46 appearances for the Tigers, Rogers hit .187 with three home runs and 19 RBI.

Rogers entered the 2026 season as the backup catcher to Dingler; in 34 games for Detroit, he posted a slash line of .161/.266/.301 with three home runs, nine RBI, and one stolen base. On July 28, 2026, Rogers was designated for assignment by the Tigers, and Eduardo Valencia assumed his role as backup.

=== Baltimore Orioles ===
On July 30, 2026, Rogers was traded to the Baltimore Orioles in exchange for Zane Barnhart. Rogers made three appearances for the Orioles, going 1–for–5 (.200) with a walk.

=== Boston Red Sox ===
On August 3, 2026, Rogers was traded to the Boston Red Sox along with Adley Rutschman and cash considerations in exchange for Enddy Azócar, Anthony Eyanson, Carlos Narváez, Kyson Witherspoon, and Harold Rivas. He made three appearances for Boston, going 3–for-6 (.500) with two RBI and two walks. Rogers was designated for assignment by the Red Sox on August 11.

=== Chicago White Sox ===
On August 14, 2026, Rogers was claimed off waivers by the Chicago White Sox. His first game with the White Sox was against the Tigers, his first major-league team, at Comerica Park. Upon debuting for Chicago, Rogers set a major-league record for the shortest time period to appear for four different teams (21 days); the previous record was set in 1904 by Frank Huelsman (42 days).

== Personal life ==
Rogers married his wife Riley in 2025.
