= Franklin Pérez =

Venezuelan baseball pitcher (born 1997)

- Pitcher
- Born: December 6, 1997 (age 28); Valencia, Venezuela
- Bats: Right Throws: Right
- Stats at Baseball Reference

Franklin Eduardo Pérez Montoya (born December 6, 1997) is a Venezuelan former professional baseball pitcher.

== Career ==
=== Houston Astros ===
Pérez signed with the Houston Astros as an international free agent in July 2014. He made his professional debut in 2015 with the Dominican Summer League Astros and was promoted to the Gulf Coast Astros later that season. He posted a combined 1–4 record and 4.50 ERA in 50 innings pitched between both teams. He pitched 2016 with the Quad Cities River Bandits where he went 3–3 with a 2.84 ERA in 66.2 innings. He began 2017 with the Buies Creek Astros and after pitching to a 4–2 record and 2.98 ERA was promoted to the Corpus Christi Hooks in July where he posted a 3.09 ERA in 32 innings.

=== Detroit Tigers ===
On August 31, 2017, the Astros traded Pérez to the Detroit Tigers, along with Jake Rogers and Daz Cameron, for Justin Verlander. The Tigers assigned him to the Erie SeaWolves but he did not play for them in 2017.

Prior to the 2018 season, he was rated as the Tigers top prospect and one of the top prospects in the minors overall. Due to a recurrence of a lat injury he suffered in 2017, Perez played in just seven games between the Gulf Coast Tigers and the Lakeland Flying Tigers in 2018. In those seven games, he went 0–2 with a 6.52 ERA in 19 innings. The Tigers added him to their 40-man roster after the 2018 season. Perez appeared in just two games for Lakeland in 2019 due to chronic shoulder injuries.

Pérez did not play in a game in 2020 due to the cancellation of the minor league season because of the COVID-19 pandemic. Pérez was added to the Tigers’ 60-man player pool for the 2020 season but did not play in a major league game, instead playing the season at the alternate training site.

On May 11, 2021, it was announced that Pérez would undergo surgery on his pitching shoulder, putting him out for “awhile”. The next day, Pérez was placed on waivers by Detroit. On May 14, Pérez re-signed with the Tigers organization on a minor league contract.

In 2022, he returned to action, making 10 starts for the rookie–level Florida Complex League Tigers, and struggling to a 9.59 ERA with 18 strikeouts in 25 1/3 innings pitched. In 2023, he made 10 appearances split between the FCL Tigers and Lakeland, posting a cumulative 6.89 ERA with 7 strikeouts in 15 2/3 innings of work. On August 4, 2023, Pérez was released by the Tigers organization.

=== Gary SouthShore RailCats ===
On February 9, 2024, Pérez signed with the Gary SouthShore RailCats of the American Association of Professional Baseball. In 15 games (4 starts) for Gary, he struggled to an 0–4 record and 9.45 ERA with more walks (24) than strikeouts (15) across 33 1/3 innings pitched. He became a free agent following the season.
