= Daz Cameron =

American baseball player (born 1997)

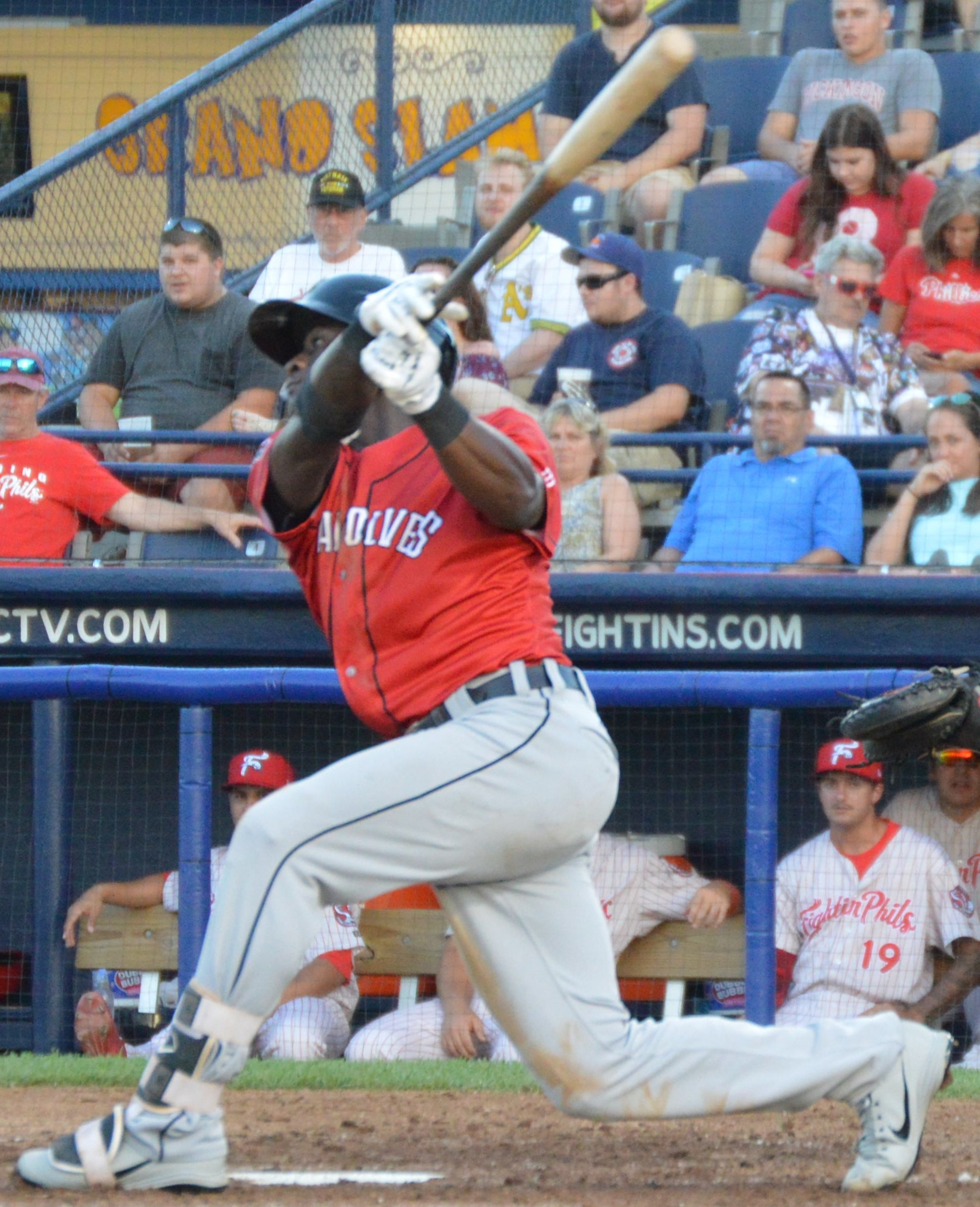
- Cameron with the Erie SeaWolves in 2018

Free agent
- Outfielder
- Born: January 15, 1997 (age 29); LaGrange, Georgia, U.S.
- Bats: Right Throws: Right

Professional debut
- MLB: September 9, 2020, for the Detroit Tigers
- KBO: March 29, 2026, for the Doosan Baers

MLB statistics (through 2026 season)
- Batting average: .200
- Home runs: 12
- Runs batted in: 45

KBO statistics (through 2026 season)
- Batting average: .298
- Home runs: 9
- Runs batted in: 41
- Stats at Baseball Reference

Teams
- Detroit Tigers (2020–2022); Oakland Athletics (2024); Milwaukee Brewers (2025); Doosan Bears (2026); Toronto Blue Jays (2026)

Dazmon Jaroid Cameron (born January 15, 1997) is an American professional baseball outfielder who is a free agent. He has previously played in Major League Baseball (MLB) for the Detroit Tigers, Oakland Athletics, Milwaukee Brewers, and Toronto Blue Jays. He has also played in the KBO League for the Doosan Bears.

Cameron attended Eagle's Landing Christian Academy in McDonough, Georgia, and was selected by the Houston Astros in the 2015 MLB draft. The Astros traded Cameron to the Tigers in 2017 and he made his MLB debut with them in 2020. Cameron played for the Tigers through the 2022 season and signed with the Athletics for the 2024 season. His father is former All-Star outfielder Mike Cameron.

== Early life and amateur career ==
Cameron is the oldest of four children born to JaBreka and Mike Cameron. Mike played in Major League Baseball (MLB) for eight teams over seventeen seasons. His father began to instruct him on how to play baseball when he was 13 years old.

Cameron attended Eagle's Landing Christian Academy in McDonough, Georgia, where he played for the school's baseball team. As a freshman, he had a .392 batting average. He improved his power in his sophomore year, finishing the season with a .434 batting average, a .764 slugging percentage, seven home runs, and 28 runs batted in (RBIs) in 106 at bats. He committed to enrolling at Florida State University on a college baseball scholarship, to play for the Florida State Seminoles.

In the summer of 2014, Cameron was a member of the USA Baseball's 18-and-under national team, competing against other nations from the Pan American Baseball Confederation. He also appeared in the 2013 and 2014 Under Armour All-America Baseball Game. As a senior in 2015, Cameron had a .455 average with eight home runs and 32 RBIs, and was chosen as Georgia's Gatorade Player of the Year.

== Professional career ==
Cameron was considered a potential first overall draft pick in the 2015 MLB draft; however, he fell into the competitive lottery pick round because of rumored high contract demands.

=== Houston Astros ===
The Houston Astros selected Cameron at 37th overall; as the team with the largest draft spending pool, they were thought to have the best chance to sign him. Cameron signed with the Astros for a reported $4 million signing bonus. After signing, Cameron reported to the Rookie League Gulf Coast League Astros. After batting only .222 with six RBI in 21 games, he was reassigned to the Greeneville Astros of the Appalachian League where he improved, batting .272 with 11 RBI and a .721 OPS in 30 games.

Cameron began the 2016 season with the Quad Cities River Bandits of the Single–A Midwest League. He struggled with Quad Cities, batting .143 in 21 games, and was reassigned to the Tri-City ValleyCats of the Low–A New York–Penn League. After playing in 19 games, in which he batted .278, Cameron broke his finger when he was hit by a pitch in July, ending his season. Cameron returned to Quad Cities for the start of the 2017 season.

=== Detroit Tigers ===
On August 31, 2017, the Astros traded Cameron, Franklin Pérez, and Jake Rogers to the Detroit Tigers in exchange for Justin Verlander. Detroit assigned him to the West Michigan Whitecaps of the Midwest League. In 123 total games between Quad Cities and West Michigan, Cameron batted .271 with 14 home runs and 74 RBI along with 32 stolen bases. Cameron began the 2018 season with the Lakeland Flying Tigers of the High–A Florida State League, and he batted .259 with three home runs and 20 RBI in 58 games played. On June 18, the Tigers promoted Cameron to the Erie SeaWolves of the Double–A Eastern League. After he batted .285 with five home runs and 35 RBI in 53 games, the Tigers promoted him to the Toledo Mud Hens of the Triple–A International League on August 17. In 15 games for Toledo, he hit .211 with six RBI. After the regular season, Cameron played for the Mesa Solar Sox of the Arizona Fall League. Cameron returned to Toledo for the 2019 season, hitting .214/.330/.377 with 13 home runs and 43 RBI.

Cameron was added to the Tigers' 40-man roster following the 2019 season, protecting him from being selected in the Rule 5 draft. On September 9, 2020, the Tigers promoted him to the major leagues and he made his major league debut that day. On September 11, Cameron recorded his first major league hit, an RBI single, off Chicago White Sox starter Lucas Giolito. Overall with the 2020 Detroit Tigers, Cameron batted .193 with no home runs and three RBI in 17 games.

Cameron made his debut with the 2021 Detroit Tigers on June 10, and the following night recorded his first major league home run, a two-run hit off Chicago White Sox closer Liam Hendriks in the bottom of the 9th inning, tying the game and extending it to extra innings. On June 23, in a game against the St. Louis Cardinals, Cameron stole a base against Yadier Molina, making him and his father Mike the first father-son duo to steal bases against Molina. They optioned him to Toledo in August.

Cameron began the 2022 season with Toledo, batting 1-for-5 for the Tigers in April before he was recalled again in May. On June 10, 2022, Cameron was placed on the injured list by the Tigers. He had only 64 at-bats with the major league club in 2022, hitting .219 with one home run.

=== Baltimore Orioles ===
Cameron was claimed off waivers by the Baltimore Orioles on November 9, 2022. On December 2, he was removed from the 40-man roster and sent outright to the Triple-A Norfolk Tides. In 110 games for Norfolk in 2023, Cameron batted .268/.346/.452 with 16 home runs, 67 RBI, and 23 stolen bases. Cameron elected free agency following the season on November 6.

=== Oakland Athletics ===
On November 17, 2023, Cameron signed a minor league contract with the Oakland Athletics. In 41 games for the Triple–A Las Vegas Aviators, he hit .307/.424/.577 with six home runs, 27 RBI, and eight stolen bases. On May 23, 2024, the Athletics selected Cameron's contract, adding him to their active roster. In 66 games for Oakland, he slashed .200/.258/.329 with career–highs in home runs (5) and RBI (15), as well as 5 stolen bases.

=== Baltimore Orioles (second stint) ===
On October 31, 2024, the Athletics traded Cameron to the Baltimore Orioles in exchange for cash considerations. He was designated for assignment by Baltimore on February 7, 2025. On February 13, Cameron cleared waivers and accepted an outright assignment to the Triple-A Norfolk Tides. In 5 appearances for Norfolk, he went 4-for-18 (.222) with 3 RBI.

=== Milwaukee Brewers ===
On April 7, 2025, Cameron and cash considerations were traded to the Milwaukee Brewers in exchange for Grant Wolfram. On April 26, the Brewers selected Cameron's contract, adding him to their active roster. In 21 appearances for Milwaukee, he batted .195/.214/.293 with one home run, three RBI, and one stolen base. Cameron was designated for assignment following the promotion of Anthony Seigler on July 1. He cleared waivers and was sent outright to Triple-A Nashville on July 5. Cameron elected free agency following the season on November 6.

=== Doosan Bears ===
On November 25, 2025, Cameron signed with the Doosan Bears of the KBO League. In 75 games, he batted .287/.360/.473 with nine home runs and 43 RBI. On June 29, 2026, Cameron was released by Doosan.

=== Toronto Blue Jays ===
On July 8, 2026, Cameron signed a minor league contract with the Toronto Blue Jays. He made 23 appearances for the Triple–A Buffalo Bisons, batting .367/.462/.582 with three home runs, 15 RBI, and 10 stolen bases. On August 15, the Blue Jays selected Cameron's contract, adding him to their active roster. In eight appearances for the team, he batted .208/.200/.375 with one home run and three RBI. Cameron was designated for assignment by Toronto on September 1. He cleared waivers and was sent outright to Buffalo on September 4. He elected free agency on November 2.

== See also ==
- List of second-generation Major League Baseball players
