= Anthony Eyanson =

American baseball player (born 2004)

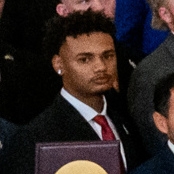
- Eyanson in 2025

Baltimore Orioles
- Pitcher
- Born: October 9, 2004 (age 21); Long Beach, California, U.S.
- Bats: Right Throws: Right
- Stats at Baseball Reference

Anthony Scott Eyanson (born October 9, 2004) is an American professional baseball pitcher in the Baltimore Orioles organization. He played college baseball for the LSU Tigers and UC San Diego Tritons and was selected by the Boston Red Sox in the third round of the 2025 MLB draft.

== Amateur career ==
Eyanson attended Lakewood High School in Lakewood, California, where he played baseball. As a senior in 2022, he had a .472 batting average alongside pitching to a 0.50 earned run average (ERA) with 110 strikeouts and was named the Press-Telegram Player of the Year. He went unselected in the 2022 Major League Baseball draft and enrolled at UC San Diego to play college baseball.

As a freshman at UC San Diego in 2023, Eyanson appeared in eight games and had a 2–1 win–loss record with a 4.34 ERA over 29 innings pitched. As a sophomore, he appeared in 14 games (making nine starts) and pitched to a 6–2 record, a 3.07 ERA, and 85 strikeouts over 82 innings. That summer, he played in the Cape Cod Baseball League with the Cotuit Kettleers alongside being named to the USA Baseball Collegiate National Team. He also announced that he would be transferring to Louisiana State University (LSU) for the 2025 season. Eyanson was slotted second into LSU's starting rotation. Over 20 games (18 starts) for the Tigers, he went 12–2 with a 3.00 ERA and 152 strikeouts over 108 innings, helping the Tigers win the 2025 Men's College World Series. He was named to the 2025 College Baseball All-America Team by Baseball America.

== Professional career ==
=== Boston Red Sox ===
Eyanson was selected by the Boston Red Sox in the third round of the 2025 Major League Baseball draft with the 87th overall pick. On July 20, 2025, Eyanson signed with the Red Sox for $1,750,000, above slot value.

Eyanson made his professional debut in 2026 with the High-A Greenville Drive. He made five starts and pitched 20 1/3 innings in which he had a 0.44 ERA, 34 strikeouts, and three walks before he was promoted to the Double-A Portland Sea Dogs. Across 11 games (ten starts) with Portland, Eyanson had a 4–0 record, a 1.69 ERA, and 60 strikeouts across 48 innings. He was selected to represent the Red Sox at the 2026 All-Star Futures Game alongside Franklin Arias.

=== Baltimore Orioles ===
On August 3, 2026, the Red Sox traded Eyanson along with Enddy Azócar, Carlos Narváez, Kyson Witherspoon and Harold Rivas to the Baltimore Orioles in exchange for Adley Rutschman, Jake Rogers, and cash considerations. The Orioles assigned him to the Double-A Chesapeake Baysox. Eyanson made six starts for Chesapeake and had a 2–1 record, a 2.03 ERA, and 47 strikeouts over 31 innings. He was awarded the Eastern League Pitcher of the Year Award for his performances with Portland and Chesapeake.

== See also ==
- All-Star Futures Game all-time roster
