= Kyson Witherspoon =

American baseball player (born 2004)

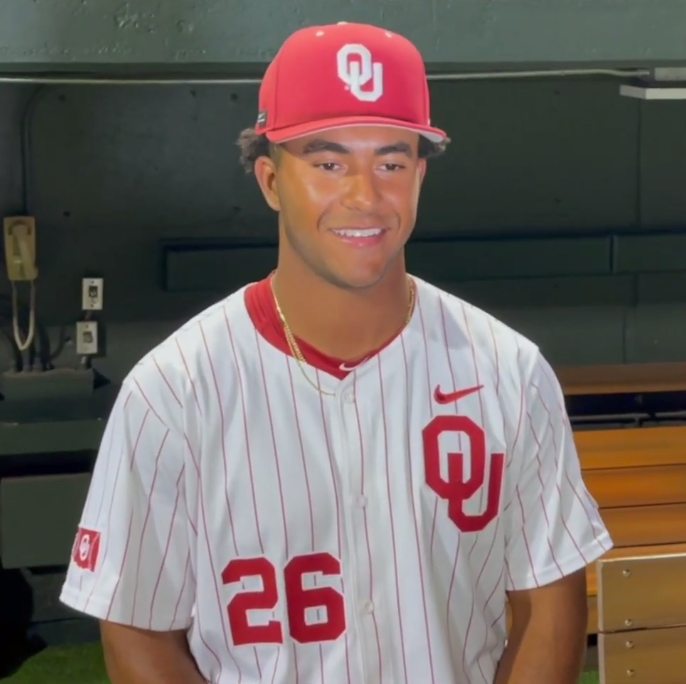
- Witherspoon with Oklahoma in 2025

Baltimore Orioles
- Pitcher
- Born: August 12, 2004 (age 22); Kansas City, Missouri, U.S.
- Bats: Right Throws: Right
- Stats at Baseball Reference

Kyson Jacob Witherspoon (born August 12, 2004) is an American professional baseball pitcher in the Baltimore Orioles organization. He was selected by the Boston Red Sox in the first round of the 2025 MLB draft, and previously played college baseball as a pitcher for the Oklahoma Sooners.

== Amateur career ==
Witherspoon attended Duncan U. Fletcher High School in Neptune Beach, Florida. He started his college career at Northwest Florida State College in 2023. In 17 games he had a 3.10 earned run average (ERA) with 72 strikeouts.

After one season at Northwest Florida State, Witherspoon transferred to the University of Oklahoma. In his first year with the Sooners in 2024, he pitched in 17 games with 11 starts and posted an 8–3 win–loss record with a 3.71 ERA with 90 strikeouts over 80 innings pitched. After the season, he played for the Chatham Anglers in the Cape Cod League. Witherspoon returned to Oklahoma as the team's number one starter in 2025. He was a consensus selection to the 2025 College Baseball All-America Team, being named by Baseball America, D1Baseball.com, the National Collegiate Baseball Writers Association, and Perfect Game.

== Professional career ==
=== Boston Red Sox ===
On July 13, 2025, Witherspoon was selected in the first round of the 2025 Major League Baseball draft by the Boston Red Sox with the 15th overall selection. The Red Sox agreed to terms with Witherspoon on July 20 for $5 million.

=== Baltimore Orioles ===
On August 3, 2026, the Red Sox traded Witherspoon, Carlos Narváez, Enddy Azócar, Anthony Eyanson, and Harold Rivas to the Baltimore Orioles in exchange for Adley Rutschman, Jake Rogers, and cash considerations.

== Personal life ==
His twin brother, Malachi Witherspoon, also plays baseball at Oklahoma and was drafted by the Detroit Tigers.
