= Carlos Narváez =

Venezuelan baseball player (born 1998)

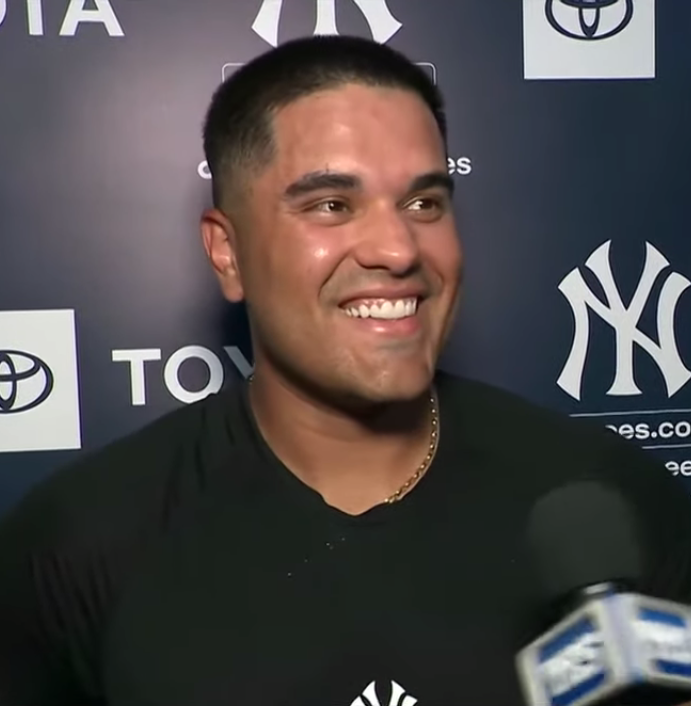
- Narváez on the day of his Major League debut

Baltimore Orioles – No. 75
- Catcher
- Born: November 26, 1998 (age 27); Maracay, Venezuela
- Bats: Right Throws: Right

MLB debut
- July 20, 2024, for the New York Yankees

MLB statistics (through 2026 season)
- Batting average: .211
- Home runs: 18
- Runs batted in: 60
- Stats at Baseball Reference

Teams
- New York Yankees (2024); Boston Red Sox (2025–2026); Baltimore Orioles (2026–present)

Carlos Luis Narváez (born November 26, 1998) is a Venezuelan professional baseball catcher for the Baltimore Orioles of Major League Baseball (MLB). He has previously played in MLB for the New York Yankees and Boston Red Sox. He made his MLB debut in 2024.

== Career ==
=== New York Yankees ===
Narváez signed with the New York Yankees as an international free agent on July 2, 2015. He made his professional debut in 2016 with the Dominican Summer League Yankees. Narváez spent 2017 with the rookie–level Gulf Coast League Yankees, hitting .255/.355/.293 with one home run and 11 RBI over 32 games.

Narváez played 2018 with the rookie–level Pulaski Yankees and Low–A Staten Island Yankees, posting a cumulative .259/.390/.310 batting line with one home run and nine RBI across 35 contests. He returned to Staten Island in 2019, playing in 43 games and hitting .265/.349/.327 with one home run and 13 RBI. Narváez did not play in a game in 2020 due to the cancellation of the minor league season because of the COVID-19 pandemic.

Narváez returned to action in 2021 with the Single–A Tampa Tarpons and High–A Hudson Valley Renegades. In 77 games split between the two affiliates, he slashed .253/.373/.391 with nine home runs and 43 RBI. Narváez spent the 2022 season with Hudson Valley, batting .194/.327/.383 with 11 home runs and 35 RBI. He split the 2023 campaign between the Double–A Somerset Patriots and Triple–A Scranton/Wilkes-Barre RailRiders. In 100 games for the two affiliates, Narváez slashed .239/.370/.397 with career–highs in home runs (12) and RBI (44).

On November 6, 2023, the Yankees added Narváez to their 40-man roster to protect him from the Rule 5 draft. He was optioned to Triple–A Scranton/Wilkes-Barre to begin the 2024 season. On April 29, 2024, the Yankees promoted Narváez to the major leagues for the first time. However, he did not make an appearance before being sent down to Triple–A on May 2, becoming a phantom ballplayer. Narvaez was promoted again on July 13, after Jose Trevino suffered an injury. He made his major league debut on July 20, recording his first MLB hit.

=== Boston Red Sox ===
On December 11, 2024, the Yankees traded Narváez to the Boston Red Sox in exchange for minor league pitcher Elmer Rodríguez and international signing bonus pool money. He made 118 appearances for Boston during the regular season, batting .241/.306/.419 with 15 home runs and 50 RBI. On October 9, 2025, Narváez underwent a "cleanup" surgery on the meniscus in his left knee.

=== Baltimore Orioles ===
On August 3, 2026, the Red Sox traded Narváez, Enddy Azócar, Anthony Eyanson, Kyson Witherspoon, and Harold Rivas to the Baltimore Orioles in exchange for Adley Rutschman, Jake Rogers, and cash considerations. He made his Orioles debut the following night as the starting catcher in a 3–1 home win over the Los Angeles Angels.

== Personal life ==
Narváez's cousin, Omar, is also an MLB player.
