= Chesapeake Baysox =

- Founded in 1987; Based in Bowie, Maryland since 1993
Team logo
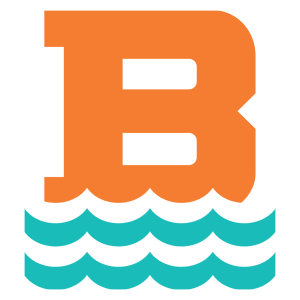
Cap insignia

Minor league affiliations
- Class: Double-A (1993–present)
- League: Eastern League (1993–present)
- Division: Southwest Division

Major league affiliations
- Team: Baltimore Orioles (1989–present)
- Previous teams: Cleveland Indians (1987–1988)

Minor league titles
- League titles (1): 2015
- Division titles (3): 2008; 2015; 2019

Team data
- Previous names: Bowie Baysox (1993–2024); Hagerstown Suns (1989–1992); Williamsport Bills (1987–1988)
- Colors: Black, orange, turquoise, white
- Mascots: Clawrence, Louie and Rocko
- Ballpark: Prince George's Stadium (1994–present)
- Previous parks: Baltimore Memorial Stadium (1993); Hagerstown Municipal Stadium (1989–1992); Williamsport Bowman Field (1987–1988)
- Owner/ Operator: Attain Sports and Entertainment
- General manager: Brian Shallcross
- Manager: Roberto Mercado
- Website: milb.com/chesapeake

The Chesapeake Baysox are a Minor League Baseball team located in Bowie, Maryland. They are the Double-A affiliate of the Baltimore Orioles, and play in the Eastern League. Their home ballpark is Prince George's Stadium. From 1993 to 2024, the team was known as the Bowie Baysox.

== History ==
From 1989 to 1992, the Orioles' Double-A affiliate was located in Hagerstown, Maryland and called the Suns. When Major League Baseball added two teams in 1993, bids were offered for two new Triple-A franchises, and the Maryland Baseball Limited Partnership (which owned the Suns and also the Advanced-A Frederick Keys) got into the running to put one of the new franchises in central Maryland. Although their bid fell short, the idea of having a team in Bowie was so well-received that the MBLP decided to move the Double-A team across the state from Hagerstown. The Suns, meanwhile, were dropped to Low-A status.

A contest was held among the community to choose a new name for the team, and over 3,500 suggestions poured in. "Baysox" was chosen over the other finalists, which were "BayBirds" and "Nationals" (the latter was chosen for the nearby Washington major-league team when it moved to the area in 2005). The "Bay" references are to the Chesapeake Bay, which lies less than 20 miles to the east of Bowie.

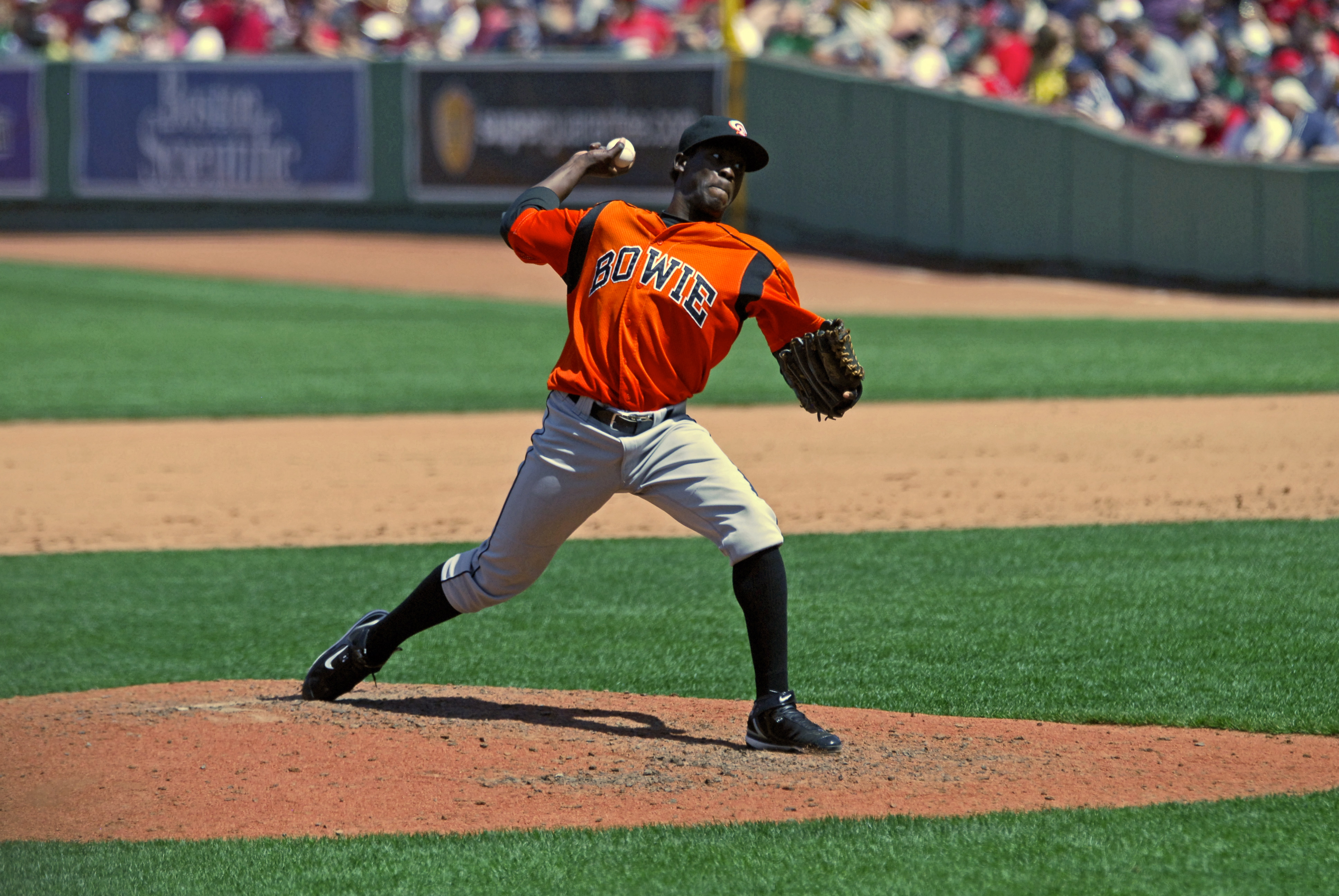
Luis Lebron pitching for the Baysox in 2009

A complex land deal hindered completion of the stadium, and in their inaugural season in 1993, the Baysox were forced to find an alternate site to play their home games. Eventually, a deal was reached that gave them Memorial Stadium in Baltimore, which had been vacated a year earlier when the Orioles moved into Camden Yards. A harsh winter prevented the new stadium from being completed in time for the beginning of the 1994 season, and the Baysox played 31 games that year at four other ballparks, including the University of Maryland and the Naval Academy. Finally, the Baysox moved into their permanent home on June 16, 1994.

After two losing seasons, the Baysox made it back to the playoffs in 1997, and were also named the top double-A franchise in America, in part because of their tremendous attendance figures despite their proximity to the Baltimore major-league market. Also in 1997 (June 28), the team introduced "Louie", its green furry mascot with pink hair and long snout, but unknown species. It is believed his design is modeled off of Chessie due to the team's name referencing the Chesapeake Bay. He continues to serve as mayor of "Louieville, Maryland", a play on the real city of Louisville, Kentucky, and also a rhyme to the team's home of Bowie.

The Baysox hosted the Double-A All-Star Game on July 12, 2000, bringing players from not only the Eastern League, but also the Southern and Texas leagues to Bowie. During that season, the Baysox also got a new owner, as the Maryland Baseball Partnership sold the team (along with the Frederick Keys and Delmarva Shorebirds) to the Comcast cable network.

The Baysox were again sold in October 2006 by Comcast Spectacor to Maryland Baseball Holding, LLC. A group headed by Ken Young, who is president of Ovations Food Service and also the owner of the Norfolk Tides, the Triple-A affiliate of the Baltimore Orioles and the Albuquerque Isotopes, the Triple-A affiliate of the Colorado Rockies.

The Baysox went six straight seasons (1998–2003) without posting a winning record. In 2005, the team was in contention for the last playoff spot at the end of the season, but lost four straight games to Altoona on the final weekend to just miss the postseason once again. They won their first regular-season division championship in 2008, but lost to the Akron Aeros 3-1 in the Division Series.

The Baysox captured its first Eastern League Championship in 2015 with a 3–2 series victory over the Reading Fightin Phils. Its 79–63 regular season finish earned the ballclub its second-ever division title by five games over Altoona. The 3–1 Divisional Series win over the Curve sent Bowie to its first championship series in six attempts. One of the team's stars was Trey Mancini, who hit .359 for the season but fell 29 plate appearances short of the 384 needed to qualify for the league batting title due to his having been promoted to the team in June.

After a 19–35 start, the 2019 Baysox won 11 of 14 matches to conclude the first half in fourth place at 30–38. The momentum propelled them to a 46–26 record and the EL Western Division second-half title. Buck Britton was rewarded for the turnaround by being named EL Manager of the Year. The Baysox won the Western Division over the Harrisburg Senators but lost the Championship Series to the Trenton Thunder, with both postseason series finishing 3–1.

In conjunction with Major League Baseball's restructuring of Minor League Baseball in 2021, the Baysox were organized into the Double-A Northeast.

In 2021, The Baysox finished second in the Double-A Northeast League with a 73–47 record. This qualified them for the Double-A Northeast finals against the Akron RubberDucks. It was the third time Bowie has qualified for the playoffs in their history, and the third time since 2015. They lost the best-of-five series versus Akron, 3–0. Grayson Rodriguez was selected as the 2021 Double-A Northeast Pitcher of the Year and Adley Rutschman as the league's Top MLB Prospect.

The Baysox were purchased from Maryland Baseball Holding, LLC by Attain Sports and Entertainment in January 2022. In 2022, the Double-A Northeast became known as the Eastern League, the name historically used by the regional circuit prior to the 2021 reorganization.

On November 22, 2024, the Baysox changed their name from the Bowie Baysox to the Chesapeake Baysox to reflect the area of the team's fan base.

On June 21, 2026, the Baysox officially named their new blue crab mascot Clawrence to join alongside Louie. The winning moniker was chosen by fans out of a write-in and fan vote via an Instagram page, drawing over 800 responses.

== Media ==
As of 2021, Baysox games are streamed audio only on their Facebook, Twitter, and YouTube accounts. Adam Pohl and Paul Fritschner share broadcasting duties. Pohl has been with the team since 2014, while Fritschner joined in 2021.

Previously, Baysox games were carried live by radio station WNAV. In 2019, 40 games were broadcast live on the radio, and all games were streamed live on the station's website.

== Promotions ==
On "Office Space night", fans, for a $1 fee, are able to live out the famous Office Space moment by destroying office equipment with a baseball bat.

On July 9, 2010, the fourth annual Autism Awareness Night took place at Prince George's Stadium. Fans that bought the Autism Awareness ticket had $3 of their ticket price donated to an autism charity of their choosing. Fans also took part in "Bowie's Largest Pillow Fight", which took place on the field following the game.

In 2016, the Baysox had a David Bowie night where the team temporarily renamed itself from the Bowie (booh-ie) Baysox to the Bowie (bowh-wy) Baysox. The jerseys were designed to look like similar outfits that he wore with his Ziggy Stardust persona. The team also played his songs during the game. They have events many nights, including fireworks.

One of the most popular promotions is Star Wars night. Characters such as Chewbacca and R2-D2 are available to meet and take pictures with, and a fireworks show set to music from the series follows the game.

The Baysox also hosts an annual Navy Night, with the plebes from the United States Naval Academy attending the game. After the game, a postgame fireworks show takes place set to patriotic music.

== Roster ==
Chesapeake Baysox roster
Players	Coaches/Other
Pitchers: 53 Micah Ashman; 11 Bradley Brehmer; 38 Jeisson Cabrera; 40 Brandon Downer; 32 Joseph Dzierwa; 18 Anthony Eyanson; 29 Keagan Gillies; 24 Sebastian Gongora; 20 Richard Guasch; 26 Andrew Herbert; 14 Caden Hunter; 54 Brock Moore; 16 Tyson Neighbors; 51 Alex Pham; 33 JT Quinn; 34 Patrick Reilly; -- Carlos Tavera; Catchers: 22 Ethan Anderson; 27 Dom Keegan; 31 Colin Tuft; Infielders: 1 Wehiwa Aloy; 35 Edwin Amparo; 7 Anderson De Los Santos; 10 Aron Estrada; 41 Victor Figueroa; 23 Griff O'Ferrall; Outfielders: 15 Frederick Bencosme; 2 Vance Honeycutt; 17 Thomas Sosa	Manager: 21 Roberto Mercado; Coaches: 58 Josh Bunselmeyer (hitting); 45 Calvin Christiansen (development); 52 Ryan Goll (fundamentals); 36 Jeremy Hileman (pitching); 60-day injured list: -- Braxton Bragg; -- Zach Fruit; -- Daniel Lloyd; -- Blake Money (full season); -- Edgar Portes (full season); 7-day injured list; * On Baltimore Orioles 40-man roster; ~ Development list; # Rehab assignment; ∞ Reserve list; ‡ Restricted list; § Suspended list; † Temporarily inactive list; Roster updated September 11, 2026; Transactions; → More rosters: MiLB • Eastern League; → Baltimore Orioles minor league players

== Season records ==
Year	Record	Percentage	Game Behind	Finish	Division	Postseason	Manager(s)
1993	72–68	.514	-23.0	3rd		Lost to Canton-Akron in Semifinals (2–3)	Don Buford
1994	84–58	.592	-5.5	2nd	Southern	Lost to Harrisburg in Semifinals (2–3)	Pete Mackanin
1995	68–74	.479	-5.0	3rd	Southern		Bob Miscik
1996	54–88	.380	-32.0	5th (last)	Southern		Bob Miscik/Tim Blackwell
1997	75–67	.528	-11.0	2nd	Southern	Lost to Harrisburg in Semifinals (2–3)	Joe Ferguson
1998	71–71	.500	-10.5	4th	Southern		Joe Ferguson
1999	70–71	.496	-10.5	4th	Southern		Joe Ferguson
2000	65–77	.458	-20.0	5th	Southern		Andy Etchebarren
2001	59–82	.418	-24.5	6th (last)	Southern		Dave Machemer
2002	55–85	.393	-37.5	5th	Southern		Dave Cash/Dave Stockstill
2003	69–72	.489	-19.0	4th	Southern		Dave Trembley
2004	73–69	.514	-12.5	3rd	Southern		Dave Trembley
2005	74–68	.521	-10.0	3rd	Southern		Don Werner
2006	67–74	.475	-19.5	4th	Southern		Don Werner
2007	72–68	.514	-9.0	4th	Southern		Bien Figueroa
2008	84–58	.592		1st	Southern	Lost to Akron in Semifinals (1–3)	Brad Komminsk
2009	73–69	.514	-16.0	3rd	Southern		Brad Komminsk
2010	75–67	.528	-7.0	3rd	Western		Brad Komminsk
2011	75–66	.532	-4.5	3rd	Western		Gary Kendall
2012	78–64	.549	-4.5	2nd	Western	Lost to Akron in Semifinals (2–3)	Gary Kendall
2013	71–71	.500	-6.0	3rd	Western		Gary Kendall
2014	72–70	.507	-7.0	3rd	Western		Gary Kendall
2015	79–63	.556		1st	Western	Defeated Altoona in Semifinals (3–1) and Reading in Finals (3–2)	Gary Kendall
2016	56–86	.394	-21.5	6th (last)	Western		Gary Kendall
2017	72–68	.514	-2.0	2nd	Western	Lost to Altoona in Semifinals (0–3)	Gary Kendall
2018	67–71	.486	-11.0	4th	Western		Gary Kendall
2019	76–64	.543	-2.0	3rd	Western	Defeated Harrisburg in Semifinals (3–1), Lost to Trenton in Finals (1–3)	Buck Britton
2020	Season canceled due to Covid-19						
2021	73–47	.608	-0.5	2nd	Southwest	Lost to Akron in Finals (0–3)	Buck Britton
2022	68–70	.493	-12.0	4th	Southwest		Kyle Moore
2023	67–70	.489	-8.0	4th	Southwest		Kyle Moore
2024	62–75	.453	-17.5	5th	Southwest		Roberto Mercado
2025	59–77	.434	-24.0	5th	Southwest		Roberto Mercado
2026	67–68	.496	-11.0	5th	Southwest		Roberto Mercado

== See also ==
- Sports in Washington, D.C.
