= Florida Complex League Orioles =

- (1991–2003, 2007–present); Sarasota, Florida

Minor league affiliations
- Class: Rookie
- League: Florida Complex League
- Division: South Division
- Previous leagues: Gulf Coast League (1991–2003, 2007–2020)

Major league affiliations
- Team: Baltimore Orioles

Minor league titles
- League titles (0): None
- Division titles (2): 1991; 2011

Team data
- Name: FCL Orioles
- Previous names: GCL Orioles (1991–2003, 2007–2020)
- Ballpark: Ed Smith Stadium
- Owner/ Operator: Baltimore Orioles
- Manager: Christian Frias

The Florida Complex League Orioles are a Rookie-level affiliate of the Baltimore Orioles, competing in the Florida Complex League of Minor League Baseball. Before 2021, the team was known as the Gulf Coast League Orioles. The team plays its home games in Sarasota, Florida at Ed Smith Stadium.

== History ==
The team first competed from 1991 to 2003 in the Gulf Coast League. After not fielding a team for three seasons, the team returned in 2007 and has competed continuously since then. The team has qualified for the postseason twice, in 1991 and 2011, and has yet to capture a league title.

Before the 2021 season, the league was renamed as the Florida Complex League. For the 2021 season, the Orioles are fielding two squads in the league, differentiated as "Black" and "Orange" in reference to the team's colors.

== Season by season ==
Year	Record	Finish	Manager	Playoffs
GCL Orioles (1991–2003)
1991	35-24	1st	Ed Napoleon	Lost League Finals vs. GCL Expos (2 games to 1)
1992	29-29	9th	Phillip Wellman	Missed
1993	30-28	8th	Oneri Fleita	Missed
1994	23-36	12th	Oneri Fleita	Missed
1995	34-25	7th	Julio Garcia	Missed
1996	36-24	4th	Tommy Shields	Missed
1997	27-33	10th	Butch Davis	Missed
1998	28-32	8th (t)	Butch Davis	Missed
1999	31-28	6th	Jesus Alfaro	Missed
2000	25-31	9th	Jesus Alfaro	Missed
2001	22-34	11th (t)	Jesus Alfaro	Missed
2002	24-36	12th	Jesus Alfaro	Missed
2003	32-28	4th	Jesus Alfaro	Missed
GCL Orioles (2007–present)
2007	32-24	2nd East	Orlando Gomez	Missed
2008	14-41	16th	Jesus Alfaro	Missed
2009	30-26	5th	Ramon Sambo	Missed
2010	25-34	13th	Ramon Sambo	Missed
2011	38-22	2nd	Ramon Sambo	Lost in 1st round vs. GCL Yankees (1 game to 0)
2012	25-35	12th	Ramon Sambo	Missed
2013	30-30	6th (t)	Orlando Gomez	Missed
2014	29-31	10th	Orlando Gomez	Missed
2015	34-25	5th (t)	Matt Merullo	Missed
2016	27-32	11th (t)	Orlando Gomez	Missed
2017	28-32	12th (t)	Carlos Tosca	Missed
2018	13-42	18th	Carlos Tosca	Missed
2019	38-15	1st	Alan Mills	Playoffs cancelled due to Hurricane Dorian

== Roster ==
Florida Complex League Orioles roster
Players	Coaches/Other
Pitchers: -- Hunter Allen; -- Harol Arias; -- KK Clark; -- Joseph Dzierwa; -- Connor Gehr; -- Kailen Hamson; -- J. D. Hennen; -- Caden Hunter; 10 Fermin Magallanes; 15 Francisco Morao; 47 Harlin Naut; -- Dalton Neuschwander; -- Brayan Orrantia; 43 Jesús Palacios; -- JT Quinn; -- Christian Rodriguez; 53 Iziah Salinas; -- Isaac Silva; -- Braeden Sloan; 17 Kevin Velasco; Catchers: -- Julio Herrera ‡; 40 Juan Ortega; 19 Omar Urbina; Infielders: 34 Félix Amparo; 21 Junior Aybar; 30 Elvin Garcia; 18 Luis Guevara; -- Joephillip Guzman; 6 DJ Layton; -- Jaiden Lo Re; Outfielders: 35 Enmanuel Corniel; -- Cam Lee; 50 Braylon Whitaker	Manager: 12 Christian Frias; Coaches: -- Zach Cole (hitting); -- Tanner Cooper (pitching); -- Andrew Downer (development); 44 Quentin Holmes (development); 13 Jamie Johnson (fundamentals); -- Alan Kolb (pitching); 16 Ramon Sambo (fundamentals); -- Jake Welch (hitting); 7-day injured list; * On Baltimore Orioles 40-man roster; ~ Development list; # Rehab assignment; ∞ Reserve list; ‡ Restricted list; § Suspended list; † Temporarily inactive list; Roster updated December 19, 2025; → More rosters: MiLB • Florida Complex League; → Baltimore Orioles minor league players
