= List of Huntsville Stars seasons =

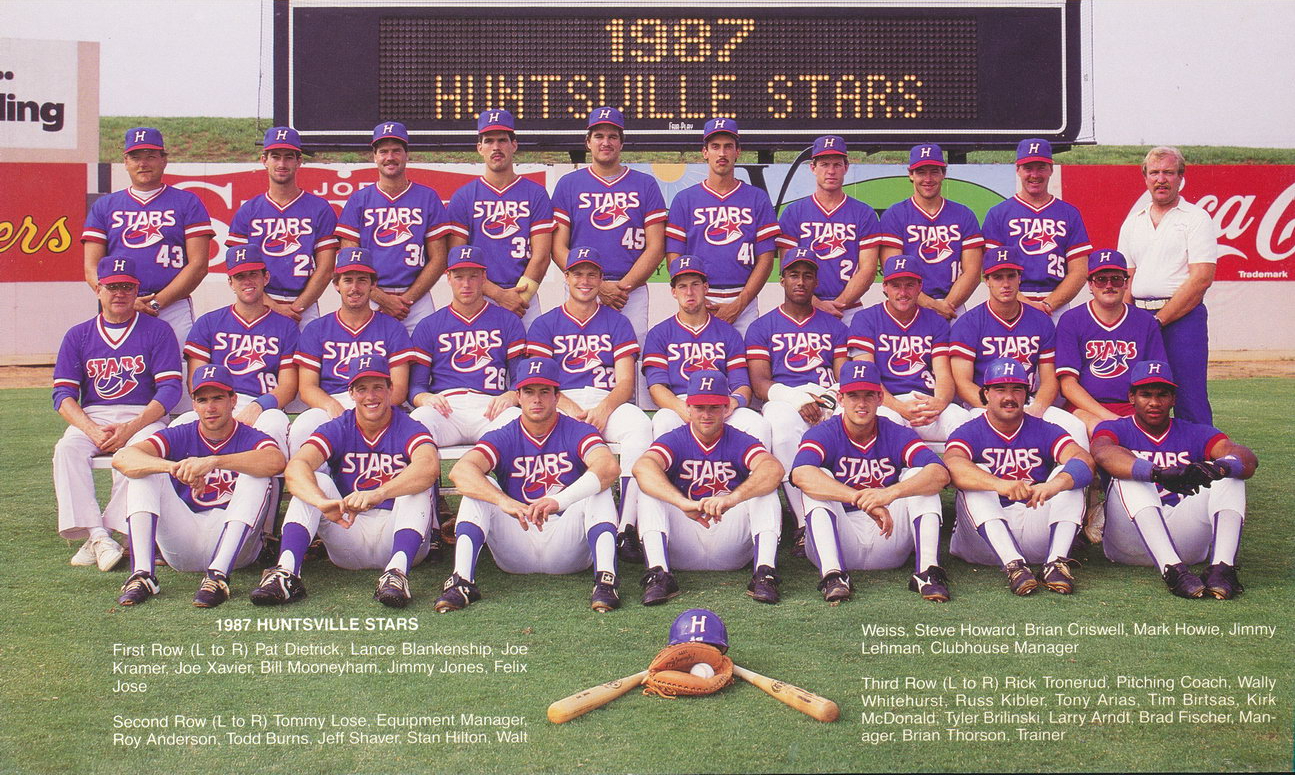
The 1987 Stars finished with a 74–70 (.514) record playing as the Double-A affiliate of the Oakland Athletics in the Southern League.

The Huntsville Stars were a Minor League Baseball team that played in Huntsville, Alabama, in the Southern League (SL) for 30 seasons from 1985 to 2014, at the Double-A level. Huntsville was affiliated with Major League Baseball's Oakland Athletics (1985–1998) and Milwaukee Brewers (1999–2014). The club played 4,211 regular-season games and compiled a win–loss record of 2,112–2,099 (.502). They appeared in the postseason on 14 occasions in which they had a record of 44–45 (.494) in 89 games. Combining all 4,300 regular-season and postseason games, Huntsville had an all-time record of 2,156–2,144 (.501).

The Stars began play in 1985 after the Nashville Sounds' Southern League franchise was relocated from Nashville, Tennessee, to Huntsville in 1985. The team remained in the league until relocating to Biloxi, Mississippi, after the 2014 campaign and becoming the Biloxi Shuckers.

The Stars' best regular-season record occurred in 1994 when they finished 81–57 (.587). Their lowest season record was 59–85 (.410), which they recorded in 1988. Of the two Major League Baseball teams with which Huntsville was affiliated, they experienced a better record as the Double-A farm club of the Athletics from 1985 to 1998. In the 14-year affiliation, the Stars compiled a win–loss record of 1,029–961 (.517). They reached the postseason eight times, going 24–24 (.500) and winning two Southern League championships (1985 and 1994). Conversely, Huntsville incurred a 1,083–1,138 (.488) record over 16 seasons with the Brewers. They made six playoff appearances and won one SL championship (2001) while going 20–21 (.488). Over their complete 30-year run, the Stars won eight division titles (1985, 1986, 1994, 1997, 2001, 2003, 2006, and 2007) and three Southern League championships (1985, 1994, and 2001).

== History ==
=== Oakland Athletics (1985–1998) ===
The Huntsville Stars began play in 1985 in the Southern League as the Double-A affiliate of the Oakland Athletics. The league used a split-season schedule wherein the division winners from each half qualified for the postseason championship playoffs. The Southern League introduced a wild card format in 1982. If the same team won both halves, the wild card would be awarded to the team with the next-best overall record, allowing them to qualify for the playoffs despite not winning a half outright. The 1985 team defeated the Knoxville Blue Jays to win the First-Half title, as well as the Western Division title, after overcoming a 2–0 deficit, before winning their first Southern League championship against the Charlotte O's. The 1986 Stars repeated with another First-Half title and won the Western Division against Knoxville. However, they were defeated in the finals by the Columbus Astros. In 1987, they reached the postseason for the third consecutive season by winning the second-half but fell to the Birmingham Barons in the division series. This was followed by a 59–85 (.410) record in 1988, the lowest in franchise history. The 1989 Stars returned to the playoffs having won the second-half, but were again defeated by Birmingham in the division finals. After failing to reach the postseason for two seasons, Huntsville qualified via a wild card berth in 1992, but they were defeated by the Chattanooga Lookouts, winners of both halves of the season, in the division series.

The Stars returned to the playoffs in 1994 with a First-Half win, and then bested Chattanooga for the Western Division title. Huntsville won its second Southern League championship versus the Carolina Mudcats. The 1994 club set a franchise record with their 81–57 (.587) season. The Stars did not return to the postseason until 1997. They won the second-half before beating the Mobile BayBears for the division before ultimately losing the championship to the Greenville Braves. The 1998 team qualified for the playoffs with a wild card berth but was swept by the BayBears in the Western Division finals. After the 1998 season, the Huntsville Stars terminated their affiliation with the Oakland Athletics. Through 14 years with the Athletics, the Stars had amassed a record of 1,053–985 (.517).

=== Milwaukee Brewers (1999–2014) ===
Huntsville became the Double-A affiliate of the Milwaukee Brewers in 1999. After posting losing records in each of the first two seasons of the new affiliation, the Stars returned to the playoffs in 2001 with the First-Half Western Division title. They won the division against Birmingham, but the September 11 attacks prompted the cancellation of the championship series before it could begin. Huntsville and the Eastern Division champion Jacksonville Suns were declared co-champions. In 2003, the First-Half champion Stars won the Western Division versus Birmingham, but lost in the Southern League championship series to Carolina. Missing the playoffs in 2004 and 2005, they made another championship attempt in 2006, winning the second-half, defeating Chattanooga for the Northern Division title, but losing the league crown to the Montgomery Biscuits. The 2007 team returned to the playoffs after winning both halves of the season. They proceeded to capture the division title over the Tennessee Smokies. Once again, they were defeated by Montgomery in the finals. The Stars won the 2009 First-Half title but lost the Northern Division to Tennessee. Sub-.500 teams from 2010 to 2013 failed to reach the playoffs, the longest postseason drought in team history.

Prior to the 2014 season, an ownership group based in Biloxi, Mississippi, purchased the team with the intent of relocating the club. The Stars played the 2014 season in Huntsville while a new ballpark was built in Biloxi. In their 30th and final season, the Stars won the First-Half title, but lost in the Northern Division series to Chattanooga. Over 16 years as a Brewers affiliate, Huntsville compiled a record of 1,103–1,159 (.488). The franchise's composite record over their entire 30-year run was 2,156–2,144 (.501).

== Season-by-season records ==
Key
League	The team's final position in the league standings
Division	The team's final position in the divisional standings
GB	Games behind the team that finished in first place in the division that season
Apps.	Postseason appearances: number of seasons the team qualified for the postseason
‡	League champions
†	Division champions
*	Postseason berth

Season-by-season results
Season	Regular-season					Postseason			MLB affiliate	Ref.
Season	Record	Win %	League	Division	GB	Record	Win %	Result	MLB affiliate	Ref.
1985 * † ‡	78–66	.542	4th	2nd	1 1/2	6–3	.667	Won First-Half Western Division title Won Western Division title vs. Knoxville Blue Jays, 3–1; Won SL championship vs. Charlotte O's, 3–2	Oakland Athletics	
1986 * †	78–63	.553	1st	1st	—	5–3	.625	Won First-Half Western Division title Won Western Division title vs. Knoxville Blue Jays, 3–1; Lost SL championship vs. Columbus Astros, 3–1	Oakland Athletics	
1987 *	74–70	.514	3rd	1st	—	0–3	.000	Won Second-Half Western Division title Lost Western Division title vs. Birmingham Barons, 3–0	Oakland Athletics	
1988	59–85	.410	10th	5th	22 1/2	—	—	—	Oakland Athletics	
1989 *	82–61	.573	2nd	2nd	6	1–3	.250	Won Second-Half Western Division title Lost Western Division title vs. Birmingham Barons, 3–1	Oakland Athletics	
1990	79–65	.549	3rd	1st	—	—	—	—	Oakland Athletics	
1991	61–83	.424	9th (tie)	4th (tie)	16 1/2	—	—	—	Oakland Athletics	
1992^	81–63	.563	3rd	2nd	9 1/2	1–3	.250	Lost Western Division title vs. Chattanooga Lookouts, 3–1	Oakland Athletics	
1993	71–70	.504	6th (tie)	4th	6 1/2	—	—	—	Oakland Athletics	
1994 * † ‡	81–57	.587	1st	1st	—	6–1	.857	Won First-Half Western Division title Won Western Division title vs. Chattanooga Lookouts, 3–0; Won SL championship vs. Carolina Mudcats, 3–1	Oakland Athletics	
1995	70–74	.486	6th	3rd	13 1/2	—	—	—	Oakland Athletics	
1996	66–74	.471	7th	5th	15 1/2	—	—	—	Oakland Athletics	
1997 † *	77–62	.554	1st	1st	—	5–5	.500	Won Second-Half Western Division title Won Western Division title vs. Mobile BayBears, 3–2; Lost SL championship vs. Greenville Braves, 3–2	Oakland Athletics	
1998 *	72–68	.514	3rd	2nd	14	0–3	.000	Lost Western Division title vs. Mobile Bay Bears, 3–0	Oakland Athletics	
1999	64–77	.454	8th	5th	20	—	—	—	Milwaukee Brewers	
2000	64–75	.460	9th (tie)	5th	16 1/2	—	—	—	Milwaukee Brewers	
2001 * † ‡	75–63	.543	4th	3rd	4	3–2	.600	Won First-Half Western Division title Won Western Division title vs. Birmingham Barons, 3–2; SL championship vs. Jacksonville Suns (Note: The series was canceled due to the September 11 attacks. Both teams were declared co-champions by the league.)	Milwaukee Brewers	
2002	70–69	.504	5th	4th	8 1/2	—	—	—	Milwaukee Brewers	
2003 * †	75–63	.543	2nd	1st	—	5–5	.500	Won First-Half Western Division title Won Western Division title vs. Birmingham Barons, 3–2; Lost SL championship vs. Carolina Mudcats, 3–2	Milwaukee Brewers	
2004	65–75	.464	8th	4th	8 1/2	—	—	—	Milwaukee Brewers	
2005	60–79	.432	8th	4th	23	—	—	—	Milwaukee Brewers	
2006 * †	67–71	.486	6th	4th	13	4–3	.571	Won Second-Half Northern Division title Won Northern Division title vs. Chattanooga Lookouts, 3–0; Lost SL championship vs. Montgomery Biscuits, 3–1	Milwaukee Brewers	
2007 * †	75–62	.547	3rd	1st	—	5–5	.500	Won First and Second-Half Northern Division titles Won Northern Division title vs. Tennessee Smokies, 3–2; Lost SL championship vs. Montgomery Biscuits, 3–2	Milwaukee Brewers	
2008	73–67	.521	4th	2nd	7	—	—	—	Milwaukee Brewers	
2009 *	63–75	.457	9th	4th	7	1–3	.250	Won First-Half Northern Division title Lost Northern Division title vs. Tennessee Smokies, 3–1	Milwaukee Brewers	
2010	67–73	.479	6th	3rd	19 1/2	—	—	—	Milwaukee Brewers	
2011	64–73	.467	8th	4th	17 1/2	—	—	—	Milwaukee Brewers	
2012	65–74	.468	8th	4th	13 1/2	—	—	—	Milwaukee Brewers	
2013	59–79	.428	8th (tie)	4th	17	—	—	—	Milwaukee Brewers	
2014 *	77–63	.550	4th	1st	—	2–3	.400	Won First-Half Northern Division title Lost Northern Division title vs. Chattanooga Lookouts, 3–2	Milwaukee Brewers	
Totals	2,112–2,099	.502	—	—	—	44–45	.494	—	—	—

== Franchise totals ==
=== By affiliation ===
Franchise totals by affiliation
Affiliation	Regular-season		Postseason			Composite	
Affiliation	Record	Win %	Apps.	Record	Win %	Record	Win %
Oakland Athletics (1985–1998)	1,029–961	.517	8	24–24	.500	1,053–985	.517
Milwaukee Brewers (1999–2014)	1,083–1,138	.488	6	20–21	.488	1,103–1,159	.488
Totals	2,112–2,099	.502	14	44–45	.494	2,156–2,144	.501
