= 2005 Southern League season =

- League: Southern League
- Sport: Baseball
- Duration: April 7 – September 5
- Number of games: 140
- Number of teams: 10

Regular season
- League champions: West Tenn Diamond Jaxx
- Season MVP: Delmon Young, Montgomery Biscuits

Playoffs
- League champions: Jacksonville Suns
- Runners-up: West Tenn Diamond Jaxx

SL seasons
- ← 2004 2006 →

The 2005 Southern League was a Class AA baseball season played between April 7 and September 5. Ten teams played a 140-game schedule, with the top team in each division in each half of the season qualifying for the post-season.

The Jacksonville Suns won the Southern League championship, defeating the West Tenn Diamond Jaxx in the playoffs.

== League changes ==
- The divisional format is changed from East Division and West Division to North Division and South Division.
- The Carolina Mudcats, Chattanooga Lookouts, Huntsville Stars, Tennessee Smokies and West Tenn Diamond Jaxx join the North Division.
- The Birmingham Barons, Jacksonville Suns, Mississippi Braves, Mobile BayBears and Montgomery Biscuits join the South Division.

== Team changes ==
- The Greenville Braves relocated to Jackson, Mississippi and were renamed to the Mississippi Braves. The club joined the newly established South Division.
- The Tennessee Smokies ended their affiliation with the St. Louis Cardinals and began a new affiliation with the Arizona Diamondbacks.

== Teams ==
2005 Southern League
Division	Team	City	MLB Affiliate	Stadium
North	Carolina Mudcats	Zebulon, North Carolina	Florida Marlins	Five County Stadium
North	Chattanooga Lookouts	Chattanooga, Tennessee	Cincinnati Reds	Bellsouth Park
North	Huntsville Stars	Huntsville, Alabama	Milwaukee Brewers	Joe W. Davis Stadium
North	Tennessee Smokies	Sevierville, Tennessee	Arizona Diamondbacks	Smokies Park
North	West Tenn Diamond Jaxx	Jackson, Tennessee	Chicago Cubs	Pringles Park
South	Birmingham Barons	Birmingham, Alabama	Chicago White Sox	Hoover Metropolitan Stadium
South	Jacksonville Suns	Jacksonville, Florida	Los Angeles Dodgers	Baseball Grounds of Jacksonville
South	Mississippi Braves	Jackson, Mississippi	Atlanta Braves	Trustmark Park
South	Mobile BayBears	Mobile, Alabama	San Diego Padres	Hank Aaron Stadium
South	Montgomery Biscuits	Montgomery, Alabama	Tampa Bay Devil Rays	Montgomery Riverwalk Stadium

== Map of teams ==
North Division South Division

== Regular season ==
=== Summary ===
- The West Tenn Diamond Jaxx finished the season with the best record in the league for the first time since 2000.

=== Standings ===
North Division
Team	Win	Loss	%	GB
West Tenn Diamond Jaxx	83	56	.597	–
Carolina Mudcats	77	57	.575	3.5
Tennessee Smokies	64	76	.457	19.5
Huntsville Stars	60	79	.432	23
Chattanooga Lookouts	53	83	.390	28.5
South Division
Birmingham Barons	82	57	.590	–
Jacksonville Suns	79	61	.564	3.5
Montgomery Biscuits	67	70	.489	14
Mississippi Braves	64	68	.485	14.5
Mobile BayBears	58	80	.420	23.5

== League Leaders ==
=== Batting leaders ===
Stat	Player	Total
AVG	Matt Murton, West Tenn Diamond Jaxx	.342
H	Jerry Owens, Birmingham Barons	173
R	Chris Young, Birmingham Barons	100
2B	Chris Young, Birmingham Barons	41
3B	Gregor Blanco, Mississippi Braves	12
HR	Brandon Sing, West Tenn Diamond Jaxx; Chris Young, Birmingham Barons	26
RBI	Darren Blakely, Birmingham Barons	89
SB	Todd Donovan, Jacksonville Suns	62

=== Pitching leaders ===
Stat	Player	Total
W	Ricky Nolasco, West Tenn Diamond Jaxx; Sean Tracey, Birmingham Barons	14
ERA	Daniel Haigwood, Birmingham Barons	1.74
CG	Charlie Haeger, Birmingham Barons; Jason Hammel, Montgomery Biscuits; Dustin Nippert, Tennessee Smokies	3
SHO	Enrique González, Tennessee Smokies; Charlie Haeger, Birmingham Barons; Dustin Nippert, Tennessee Smokies	2
SV	Dale Thayer, Mobile BayBears	27
IP	Jae Kuk Ryu, West Tenn Diamond Jaxx	169.2
SO	Ricky Nolasco, West Tenn Diamond Jaxx	173

== Playoffs ==
- The Jacksonville Suns won their third Southern League championship, defeating the West Tenn Diamond Jaxx in four games.

=== Playoff bracket ===
Division finals
N1	West Tenn	3
N2	Carolina	0
S1	Birmingham	0
S2	Jacksonville	3

Finals
N1	West Tenn	1
S2	Jacksonville	3

== Awards ==
Southern League awards
Award name	Recipient
Most Valuable Player	Delmon Young, Montgomery Biscuits
Pitcher of the Year	Ricky Nolasco, West Tenn Diamond Jaxx
Manager of the Year	Razor Shines, Birmingham Barons

== See also ==
- 2005 Major League Baseball season
