= 2006 Southern League season =

- League: Southern League
- Sport: Baseball
- Duration: April 6 – September 4
- Number of games: 140
- Number of teams: 10

Regular season
- League champions: Jacksonville Suns
- Season MVP: Joey Votto, Chattanooga Lookouts

Playoffs
- League champions: Montgomery Biscuits
- Runners-up: Huntsville Stars

SL seasons
- ← 2005 2007 →

The 2006 Southern League was a Class AA baseball season played between April 6 and September 4. Ten teams played a 140-game schedule, with the top team in each division in each half of the season qualifying for the post-season.

The Montgomery Biscuits won the Southern League championship, defeating the Huntsville Stars in the playoffs.

== Teams ==
2006 Southern League
Division	Team	City	MLB Affiliate	Stadium
North	Carolina Mudcats	Zebulon, North Carolina	Florida Marlins	Five County Stadium
North	Chattanooga Lookouts	Chattanooga, Tennessee	Cincinnati Reds	BellSouth Park
North	Huntsville Stars	Huntsville, Alabama	Milwaukee Brewers	Joe W. Davis Stadium
North	Tennessee Smokies	Sevierville, Tennessee	Arizona Diamondbacks	Smokies Park
North	West Tenn Diamond Jaxx	Jackson, Tennessee	Chicago Cubs	Pringles Park
South	Birmingham Barons	Birmingham, Alabama	Chicago White Sox	Hoover Metropolitan Stadium
South	Jacksonville Suns	Jacksonville, Florida	Los Angeles Dodgers	Baseball Grounds of Jacksonville
South	Mississippi Braves	Jackson, Mississippi	Atlanta Braves	Trustmark Park
South	Mobile BayBears	Mobile, Alabama	San Diego Padres	Hank Aaron Stadium
South	Montgomery Biscuits	Montgomery, Alabama	Tampa Bay Devil Rays	Montgomery Riverwalk Stadium

== Map of teams ==
North Division South Division

== Regular season ==
=== Summary ===
- The Jacksonville Suns finished the season with the best record in the league for the first time since 2001.

=== Standings ===
North Division
Team	Win	Loss	%	GB
Chattanooga Lookouts	81	59	.579	–
West Tenn Diamond Jaxx	75	65	.536	6
Tennessee Smokies	70	69	.504	10.5
Huntsville Stars	67	71	.486	13
Carolina Mudcats	61	79	.436	20
South Division
Jacksonville Suns	86	54	.614	–
Montgomery Biscuits	77	62	.554	8.5
Mobile BayBears	62	76	.449	23
Birmingham Barons	59	81	.421	27
Mississippi Braves	58	80	.420	27

== League Leaders ==
=== Batting leaders ===
Stat	Player	Total
AVG	Joey Votto, Chattanooga Lookouts	.319
H	Joey Votto, Chattanooga Lookouts	162
R	Joey Votto, Chattanooga Lookouts	85
2B	Joey Votto, Chattanooga Lookouts	46
3B	Chris Walker, West Tenn Diamond Jaxx	11
HR	Jerry Gil, Tennessee Smokies	26
RBI	Craig Brazell, Jacksonville Suns	91
SB	Chris Walker, West Tenn Diamond Jaxx	50

=== Pitching leaders ===
Stat	Player	Total
W	Spike Lundberg, Jacksonville Suns; Andy Sonnanstine, Montgomery Biscuits	15
ERA	Spike Lundberg, Jacksonville Suns	2.27
CG	Ross Ohlendorf, Tennessee Smokies; Andy Sonnanstine, Montgomery Biscuits	4
SHO	Andy Sonnanstine, Montgomery Biscuits	4
SV	Dale Thayer, Mobile BayBears	27
IP	Andy Sonnanstine, Montgomery Biscuits	185.2
SO	T.J. Nall, Jacksonville Suns	155

== Playoffs ==
- The Montgomery Biscuits won their fourth Southern League championship, defeating the Huntsville Stars in four games.

=== Playoff bracket ===
Division finals
N1	Chattanooga	0
N2	Huntsville	3
S1	Jacksonville	0
S2	Montgomery	3

Finals
N2	Huntsville	1
S2	Montgomery	3

== Awards ==
Southern League awards
Award name	Recipient
Most Valuable Player	Joey Votto, Chattanooga Lookouts
Pitcher of the Year	Spike Lundberg, Jacksonville Suns
Manager of the Year	John Shoemaker, Jacksonville Suns

== See also ==
- 2006 Major League Baseball season
