= 2012 Southern League season =

- League: Southern League
- Sport: Baseball
- Duration: April 5 – September 3
- Number of games: 140
- Number of teams: 10

Regular season
- League champions: Jackson Generals
- Season MVP: Hunter Morris, Huntsville Stars

Playoffs
- League champions: Mobile BayBears
- Runners-up: Jackson Generals

SL seasons
- ← 2011 2013 →

The 2012 Southern League was a Class AA baseball season played between April 5 and September 3. Ten teams played a 140-game schedule, with the top team in each division in each half of the season qualifying for the post-season.

The Mobile BayBears won the Southern League championship, defeating the Jackson Generals in the playoffs.

== Team changes ==
- The Carolina Mudcats relocated to Pensacola, Florida and are renamed to the Pensacola Blue Wahoos. The club moves from the North Division to the South Division and remains affiliated with the Cincinnati Reds.
- The Birmingham Barons move from the South Division to the North Division.

== Teams ==
2012 Southern League
Division	Team	City	MLB Affiliate	Stadium
North	Birmingham Barons	Birmingham, Alabama	Chicago White Sox	Regions Park
North	Chattanooga Lookouts	Chattanooga, Tennessee	Los Angeles Dodgers	AT&T Field
North	Huntsville Stars	Huntsville, Alabama	Milwaukee Brewers	Joe W. Davis Stadium
North	Jackson Generals	Jackson, Tennessee	Seattle Mariners	Pringles Park
North	Tennessee Smokies	Sevierville, Tennessee	Chicago Cubs	Smokies Park
South	Jacksonville Suns	Jacksonville, Florida	Miami Marlins	Baseball Grounds of Jacksonville
South	Mississippi Braves	Jackson, Mississippi	Atlanta Braves	Trustmark Park
South	Mobile BayBears	Mobile, Alabama	Arizona Diamondbacks	Hank Aaron Stadium
South	Montgomery Biscuits	Montgomery, Alabama	Tampa Bay Rays	Montgomery Riverwalk Stadium
South	Pensacola Blue Wahoos	Pensacola, Florida	Cincinnati Reds	Blue Wahoos Stadium

== Map of teams ==
North Division South Division

== Regular season ==
=== Summary ===
- The Jackson Generals finished the season with the best record in the league for the first time since 2005.

=== Standings ===
North Division
Team	Win	Loss	%	GB
Jackson Generals	79	61	.564	–
Chattanooga Lookouts	73	65	.529	5
Tennessee Smokies	72	68	.514	7
Huntsville Stars	65	74	.468	13.5
Birmingham Barons	63	76	.453	15.5
South Division
Montgomery Biscuits	74	63	.540	–
Jacksonville Suns	70	70	.500	5.5
Mobile BayBears	69	71	.493	6.5
Pensacola Blue Wahoos	68	70	.493	6.5
Mississippi Braves	62	77	.446	13

== League Leaders ==
=== Batting leaders ===
Stat	Player	Total
AVG	Omar Luna, Montgomery Biscuits	.315
H	Hunter Morris, Huntsville Stars	158
R	Logan Watkins, Tennessee Smokies	93
2B	J. T. Wise, Chattanooga Lookouts	41
3B	Jared Mitchell, Birmingham Barons	12
HR	Hunter Morris, Huntsville Stars	28
RBI	Hunter Morris, Huntsville Stars	113
SB	Billy Hamilton, Pensacola Blue Wahoos	51

=== Pitching leaders ===
Stat	Player	Total
W	Nick Struck, Tennessee Smokies	14
ERA	Chase Anderson, Mobile BayBears	2.86
CG	José Álvarez, Jacksonville Suns; Sean Gilmartin, Mississippi Braves	3
SHO	José Álvarez, Jacksonville Suns; Evan Anundsen, Huntsville Stars; Anthony Fernandez, Jackson Generals; Graham Taylor, Jacksonville Suns	1
SV	Frank Batista, Tennessee Smokies	24
IP	Zeke Spruill, Mississippi Braves	161.2
SO	Matt Magill, Chattanooga Lookouts	168

== Playoffs ==
- The Mobile BayBears won their second consecutive, and fourth overall Southern League championship, defeating the Jackson Generals in four games.

=== Playoff bracket ===
Division finals
N1	Jackson	3
N2	Chattanooga	1
S1	Montgomery	1
S2	Mobile	3

Finals
N1	Jackson	1
S2	Mobile	3

== Awards ==
Southern League awards
Award name	Recipient
Most Valuable Player	Hunter Morris, Huntsville Stars
Pitcher of the Year	Brandon Maurer, Jackson Generals
Manager of the Year	Billy Gardner Jr., Montgomery Biscuits

== See also ==
- 2012 Major League Baseball season
