= 2008 Southern League season =

- League: Southern League
- Sport: Baseball
- Duration: April 3 – September 1
- Number of games: 140
- Number of teams: 10

Regular season
- League champions: Carolina Mudcats
- Season MVP: Gaby Sánchez, Carolina Mudcats

Playoffs
- League champions: Mississippi Braves
- Runners-up: Carolina Mudcats

SL seasons
- ← 2007 2009 →

The 2008 Southern League was a Class AA baseball season played between April 3 and September 1. Ten teams played a 140-game schedule, with the top team in each division in each half of the season qualifying for the post-season.

The Mississippi Braves won the Southern League championship, defeating the Carolina Mudcats in the playoffs.

== Teams ==
2008 Southern League
Division	Team	City	MLB Affiliate	Stadium
North	Carolina Mudcats	Zebulon, North Carolina	Florida Marlins	Five County Stadium
North	Chattanooga Lookouts	Chattanooga, Tennessee	Cincinnati Reds	AT&T Field
North	Huntsville Stars	Huntsville, Alabama	Milwaukee Brewers	Joe W. Davis Stadium
North	Tennessee Smokies	Sevierville, Tennessee	Chicago Cubs	Smokies Park
North	West Tenn Diamond Jaxx	Jackson, Tennessee	Seattle Mariners	Pringles Park
South	Birmingham Barons	Birmingham, Alabama	Chicago White Sox	Regions Park
South	Jacksonville Suns	Jacksonville, Florida	Los Angeles Dodgers	Baseball Grounds of Jacksonville
South	Mississippi Braves	Jackson, Mississippi	Atlanta Braves	Trustmark Park
South	Mobile BayBears	Mobile, Alabama	Arizona Diamondbacks	Hank Aaron Stadium
South	Montgomery Biscuits	Montgomery, Alabama	Tampa Bay Rays	Montgomery Riverwalk Stadium

== Map of teams ==
North Division South Division

== Regular season ==
=== Summary ===
- The Carolina Mudcats finished the season with the best record in the league for the first time since 2003.

=== Standings ===
North Division
Team	Win	Loss	%	GB
Carolina Mudcats	80	60	.571	–
Huntsville Stars	73	67	.521	7
West Tenn Diamond Jaxx	70	68	.507	9
Chattanooga Lookouts	67	72	.482	12.5
Tennessee Smokies	62	77	.446	17.5
South Division
Birmingham Barons	74	63	.540	–
Mississippi Braves	73	66	.525	2
Montgomery Biscuits	69	70	.496	6
Jacksonville Suns	68	72	.486	7.5
Mobile BayBears	58	79	.423	16

== League Leaders ==
=== Batting leaders ===
Stat	Player	Total
AVG	Ángel Salomé, Huntsville Stars	.360
H	Alcides Escobar, Huntsville Stars	179
R	John Raynor, Carolina Mudcats	104
2B	Gaby Sánchez, Carolina Mudcats	42
3B	Tyler Colvin, Tennessee Smokies; Matt Young, Mississippi Braves	11
HR	Mike Wilson, West Tenn Diamond Jaxx	27
RBI	Mat Gamel, Huntsville Stars	96
SB	John Raynor, Carolina Mudcats	48

=== Pitching leaders ===
Stat	Player	Total
W	Todd Redmond, Mississippi Braves	13
ERA	Justin Cassel, Birmingham Barons	3.11
CG	Héctor Ambriz, Mobile BayBears; Rich Dorman, West Tenn Diamond Jaxx; Donovan Hand, Huntsville Stars; Sam Narron, Huntsville Stars	2
SHO	Tommy Hanson, Mississippi Braves; Clayton Richard, Birmingham Barons; Justin Thomas, West Tenn Diamond Jaxx; David Welch, Huntsville Stars; Joe Woerman, West Tenn Diamond Jaxx	1
SV	Jon Link, Birmingham Barons	35
IP	Brae Wright, Huntsville Stars	170.2
SO	Tony Barnette, Mobile BayBears; Todd Redmond, Mississippi Braves	133

== Playoffs ==
- The Mississippi Braves won their first Southern League championship, defeating the Carolina Mudcats in five games.

=== Playoff bracket ===
Division finals
N1	Carolina	3
N2	West Tenn	2
S1	Birmingham	2
S2	Mississippi	3

Finals
N1	Carolina	2
S2	Mississippi	3

== Awards ==
Southern League awards
Award name	Recipient
Most Valuable Player	Gaby Sánchez, Carolina Mudcats
Pitcher of the Year	Todd Redmond, Mississippi Braves
Manager of the Year	Phillip Wellman, Mississippi Braves

== See also ==
- 2008 Major League Baseball season
