= 2009 Southern League season =

- League: Southern League
- Sport: Baseball
- Duration: April 9 – September 7
- Number of games: 140
- Number of teams: 10

Regular season
- League champions: Birmingham Barons
- Season MVP: Desmond Jennings, Montgomery Biscuits

Playoffs
- League champions: Jacksonville Suns
- Runners-up: Tennessee Smokies

SL seasons
- ← 2008 2010 →

The 2009 Southern League was a Class AA baseball season played between April 9 and September 7. Ten teams played a 140-game schedule, with the top team in each division in each half of the season qualifying for the post-season.

The Jacksonville Suns won the Southern League championship, defeating the Tennessee Smokies in the playoffs.

== Team changes ==
- The Carolina Mudcats ended their affiliation with the Florida Marlins and began a new affiliation with the Cincinnati Reds.
- The Chattanooga Lookouts ended their affiliation with the Cincinnati Reds and began a new affiliation with the Los Angeles Dodgers.
- The Jacksonville Suns ended their affiliation with the Los Angeles Dodgers and began a new affiliation with the Florida Marlins.

== Teams ==
2009 Southern League
| Division | Team | City | MLB Affiliate | Stadium |
| North | Carolina Mudcats | Zebulon, North Carolina | Cincinnati Reds | Five County Stadium |
| North | Chattanooga Lookouts | Chattanooga, Tennessee | Los Angeles Dodgers | AT&T Field |
| North | Huntsville Stars | Huntsville, Alabama | Milwaukee Brewers | Joe W. Davis Stadium |
| North | Tennessee Smokies | Sevierville, Tennessee | Chicago Cubs | Smokies Park |
| North | West Tenn Diamond Jaxx | Jackson, Tennessee | Seattle Mariners | Pringles Park |
| South | Birmingham Barons | Birmingham, Alabama | Chicago White Sox | Regions Park |
| South | Jacksonville Suns | Jacksonville, Florida | Florida Marlins | Baseball Grounds of Jacksonville |
| South | Mississippi Braves | Jackson, Mississippi | Atlanta Braves | Trustmark Park |
| South | Mobile BayBears | Mobile, Alabama | Arizona Diamondbacks | Hank Aaron Stadium |
| South | Montgomery Biscuits | Montgomery, Alabama | Tampa Bay Rays | Montgomery Riverwalk Stadium |

== Map of teams ==
North Division South Division

== Regular season ==
=== Summary ===
- The Birmingham Barons finished the season with the best record in the league for the first time since 2002.

=== Standings ===
North Division
| Team | Win | Loss | % | GB |
|---|---|---|---|---|
| Tennessee Smokies | 71 | 69 | .507 | – |
| Carolina Mudcats | 65 | 74 | .468 | 5.5 |
| Chattanooga Lookouts | 65 | 74 | .468 | 5.5 |
| Huntsville Stars | 63 | 75 | .457 | 7 |
| West Tenn Diamond Jaxx | 62 | 78 | .443 | 9 |
South Division
| Birmingham Barons | 92 | 47 | .662 | – |
| Jacksonville Suns | 82 | 58 | .586 | 10.5 |
| Mobile BayBears | 66 | 74 | .471 | 26.5 |
| Mississippi Braves | 65 | 73 | .471 | 26.5 |
| Montgomery Biscuits | 65 | 74 | .468 | 27 |

== League Leaders ==
=== Batting leaders ===
| Stat | Player | Total |
|---|---|---|
| AVG | Ezequiel Carrera, West Tenn Diamond Jaxx | .337 |
| H | C.J. Retherford, Birmingham Barons | 142 |
| R | David Cook, Birmingham Barons | 87 |
| 2B | C.J. Retherford, Birmingham Barons | 46 |
| 3B | Scott Cousins, Jacksonville Suns | 11 |
| HR | David Cook, Birmingham Barons; Greg Halman, West Tenn Diamond Jaxx | 25 |
| RBI | David Cook, Birmingham Barons | 84 |
| SB | Matt Young, Mississippi Braves | 42 |

=== Pitching leaders ===
| Stat | Player | Total |
|---|---|---|
| W | Casey Coleman, Tennessee Smokies; John Ely, Birmingham Barons | 14 |
| ERA | Travis Wood, Carolina Mudcats | 1.21 |
| CG | Matt Torra, Mobile BayBears | 4 |
| SHO | Steve Bray, West Tenn Diamond Jaxx; Matt Torra, Mobile BayBears | 2 |
| SV | Matt Peterson, Jacksonville Suns | 37 |
| IP | Matt Torra, Mobile BayBears | 180.0 |
| SO | John Ely, Birmingham Barons | 125 |

== Playoffs ==
- The Jacksonville Suns won their fourth Southern League championship, defeating the Tennessee Smokies in four games.

=== Playoff bracket ===
Division finals
N1 | Tennessee | 3
N2 | Huntsville | 1
S1 | Birmingham | 0
S2 | Jacksonville | 3

Finals
N1 | Tennessee | 1
S2 | Jacksonville | 3

== Awards ==
Southern League awards
| Award name | Recipient |
|---|---|
| Most Valuable Player | Desmond Jennings, Montgomery Biscuits |
| Pitcher of the Year | Travis Wood, Carolina Mudcats |
| Manager of the Year | Ever Magallanes, Birmingham Barons |

== See also ==
- 2009 Major League Baseball season
