= 1999 Southern League season =

- League: Southern League
- Sport: Baseball
- Duration: April 8 – September 6
- Number of games: 144
- Number of teams: 10

Regular season
- League champions: West Tenn Diamond Jaxx
- Season MVP: Brady Clark, Chattanooga Lookouts

Playoffs
- League champions: Orlando Rays
- Runners-up: West Tenn Diamond Jaxx

SL seasons
- ← 1998 2000 →

The 1999 Southern League was a Class AA baseball season played between April 8 and September 6. Ten teams played a 144-game schedule, with the top team in each division in each half of the season qualifying for the post-season.

The Orlando Rays won the Southern League championship, as they defeated the West Tenn Diamond Jaxx in the playoffs.

== Team changes ==
- The Carolina Mudcats ended their affiliation with the Pittsburgh Pirates and began a new affiliation with the Colorado Rockies.
- The Huntsville Stars ended their affiliation with the Oakland Athletics and began a new affiliation with the Milwaukee Brewers.
- The Orlando Rays ended their affiliation with the Seattle Mariners and began a new affiliation with the Tampa Bay Devil Rays.

== Teams ==
1999 Southern League
Division	Team	City	MLB Affiliate	Stadium
East	Carolina Mudcats	Zebulon, North Carolina	Colorado Rockies	Five County Stadium
East	Greenville Braves	Greenville, South Carolina	Atlanta Braves	Greenville Municipal Stadium
East	Jacksonville Suns	Jacksonville, Florida	Detroit Tigers	Wolfson Park
East	Knoxville Smokies	Knoxville, Tennessee	Toronto Blue Jays	Bill Meyer Stadium
East	Orlando Rays	Orlando, Florida	Tampa Bay Devil Rays	Tinker Field
West	Birmingham Barons	Birmingham, Alabama	Chicago White Sox	Hoover Metropolitan Stadium
West	Chattanooga Lookouts	Chattanooga, Tennessee	Cincinnati Reds	Engel Stadium
West	Huntsville Stars	Huntsville, Alabama	Milwaukee Brewers	Joe W. Davis Stadium
West	Mobile BayBears	Mobile, Alabama	San Diego Padres	Hank Aaron Stadium
West	West Tenn Diamond Jaxx	Jackson, Tennessee	Chicago Cubs	Pringles Park

== Map of teams ==
East Division West Division

== Regular season ==
=== Summary ===
- The West Tenn Diamond Jaxx finished the season with the best record in the league for the first time in team history.
- Despite finishing the regular season with the best record in the East Division, the Jacksonville Suns failed to qualify for the playoffs as they did not finish either half of the season in first place.

=== Standings ===
East Division
Team	Win	Loss	%	GB
Jacksonville Suns	75	66	.532	–
Knoxville Smokies	71	69	.507	3.5
Orlando Rays	70	68	.507	3.5
Carolina Mudcats	60	80	.429	14.5
Greenville Braves	58	80	.420	15.5
West Division
West Tenn Diamond Jaxx	84	57	.596	–
Chattanooga Lookouts	78	62	.557	5.5
Birmingham Barons	73	67	.521	10.5
Mobile BayBears	66	73	.475	17
Huntsville Stars	64	77	.454	20

== League Leaders ==
=== Batting leaders ===
Stat	Player	Total
AVG	Brady Clark, Chattanooga Lookouts	.326
H	Brent Abernathy, Knoxville Smokies	168
R	Brent Abernathy, Knoxville Smokies	108
2B	Scott Vieira, West Tenn Diamond Jaxx	44
3B	Ethan Faggett, Mobile BayBears	11
HR	Javier Cardona, Jacksonville Suns	26
RBI	Tim Giles, Knoxville Smokies	114
SB	Ethan Faggett, Mobile BayBears	64

=== Pitching leaders ===
Stat	Player	Total
W	Dave Darwin, Jacksonville Suns	14
ERA	Jeff Yoder, West Tenn Diamond Jaxx	3.08
CG	David Manning, West Tenn Diamond Jaxx	6
SHO	Junior Herndon, Mobile BayBears; David Manning, West Tenn Diamond Jaxx; Derek Lee, Huntsville Stars	2
SV	Francisco Cordero, Jacksonville Suns	27
IP	Dave Darwin, Jacksonville Suns	187.1
SO	Víctor Santos, Jacksonville Suns	146

== Playoffs ==
- The Orlando Rays won their third Southern League championship, defeating the West Tenn Diamond Jaxx in four games.

=== Playoff bracket ===
Division finals
E1	Knoxville	1
E2	Orlando	3
W1	West Tenn	3
W2	Chattanooga	1

Finals
E2	Orlando	3
W1	West Tenn	1

== Awards ==
Southern League awards
Award name	Recipient
Most Valuable Player	Brady Clark, Chattanooga Lookouts
Pitcher of the Year	Francisco Cordero, Jacksonville Suns
Manager of the Year	Dave Trembley, West Tenn Diamond Jaxx

== See also ==
- 1999 Major League Baseball season
