= 2000 Southern League season =

- League: Southern League
- Sport: Baseball
- Duration: April 6 – September 4
- Number of games: 140
- Number of teams: 10

Regular season
- League champions: West Tenn Diamond Jaxx
- Season MVP: Joe Crede, Birmingham Barons

Playoffs
- League champions: West Tenn Diamond Jaxx
- Runners-up: Jacksonville Suns

SL seasons
- ← 1999 2001 →

The 2000 Southern League was a Class AA baseball season played between April 8 and September 6. Ten teams played a 140-game schedule, with the top team in each division in each half of the season qualifying for the post-season.

The West Tenn Diamond Jaxx won the Southern League championship, as they defeated the Jacksonville Suns in the playoffs.

== Team changes ==
- The Knoxville Smokies opened a new stadium in Sevierville, Tennessee and are renamed to the Tennessee Smokies. The club remained affiliated with the Toronto Blue Jays.

== Teams ==
2000 Southern League
Division	Team	City	MLB Affiliate	Stadium
East	Carolina Mudcats	Zebulon, North Carolina	Colorado Rockies	Five County Stadium
East	Greenville Braves	Greenville, South Carolina	Atlanta Braves	Greenville Municipal Stadium
East	Jacksonville Suns	Jacksonville, Florida	Detroit Tigers	Wolfson Park
East	Orlando Rays	Kissimmee, Florida	Tampa Bay Devil Rays	Cracker Jack Stadium
East	Tennessee Smokies	Sevierville, Tennessee	Toronto Blue Jays	Smokies Park
West	Birmingham Barons	Birmingham, Alabama	Chicago White Sox	Hoover Metropolitan Stadium
West	Chattanooga Lookouts	Chattanooga, Tennessee	Cincinnati Reds	Bellsouth Park
West	Huntsville Stars	Huntsville, Alabama	Milwaukee Brewers	Joe W. Davis Stadium
West	Mobile BayBears	Mobile, Alabama	San Diego Padres	Hank Aaron Stadium
West	West Tenn Diamond Jaxx	Jackson, Tennessee	Chicago Cubs	Pringles Park

== Map of teams ==
East Division West Division

== Regular season ==
=== Summary ===
- The West Tenn Diamond Jaxx finished the season with the best record in the league for the second consecutive season.
- Despite finishing the regular season with the best record in the East Division, the Tennessee Smokies failed to qualify for the playoffs as they did not finish either half of the season in first place.

=== Standings ===
East Division
Team	Win	Loss	%	GB
Tennessee Smokies	71	69	.507	–
Jacksonville Suns	69	71	.493	2
Greenville Braves	68	71	.489	2.5
Orlando Rays	65	71	.478	4
Carolina Mudcats	64	75	.460	6.5
West Division
West Tenn Diamond Jaxx	80	58	.580	–
Birmingham Barons	77	63	.550	4
Chattanooga Lookouts	70	68	.507	10
Mobile BayBears	66	73	.475	14.5
Huntsville Stars	64	75	.460	16.5

== League Leaders ==
=== Batting leaders ===
Stat	Player	Total
AVG	Juan Pierre, Carolina Mudcats	.326
H	Joe Crede, Birmingham Barons	163
R	Elvis Peña, Carolina Mudcats	92
2B	Stoney Briggs, Jacksonville Suns	39
3B	Eric Hinske, West Tenn Diamond Jaxx	9
HR	Alejandro Freire, Jacksonville Suns	25
RBI	Aaron Rowand, Birmingham Barons	98
SB	Elvis Peña, Carolina Mudcats	48

=== Pitching leaders ===
Stat	Player	Total
W	Robert Averette, Chattanooga / Carolina	13
ERA	Lance Davis, Chattanooga Lookouts	2.18
CG	Robert Averette, Chattanooga / Carolina	5
SHO	Shawn Chacón, Carolina Mudcats	3
SV	Kris Keller, Jacksonville Suns	26
IP	Josh Fogg, Birmingham Barons	192.1
SO	Shawn Chacón, Carolina Mudcats	172

== Playoffs ==
- The West Tenn Diamond Jaxx won their first Southern League championship, defeating the Jacksonville Suns in five games.

=== Playoff bracket ===
Division finals
E1	Jacksonville	3
E2	Greenville	2
W1	West Tenn	3
W2	Birmingham	2

Finals
E1	Jacksonville	2
W1	West Tenn	3

== Awards ==
Southern League awards
Award name	Recipient
Most Valuable Player	Joe Crede, Birmingham Barons
Pitcher of the Year	Mark Buehrle, Birmingham Barons
Manager of the Year	Dave Bialas, West Tenn Diamond Jaxx

== See also ==
- 2000 Major League Baseball season
