= 2001 Southern League season =

- League: Southern League
- Sport: Baseball
- Duration: April 5 – September 3
- Number of games: 140
- Number of teams: 10

Regular season
- League champions: Jacksonville Suns
- Season MVP: Josh Phelps, Tennessee Smokies

Playoffs
- League champions: Huntsville Stars; Jacksonville Suns

SL seasons
- ← 2000 2002 →

The 2001 Southern League was a Class AA baseball season played between April 5 and September 3. Ten teams played a 140-game schedule, with the top team in each division in each half of the season qualifying for the post-season.

The Huntsville Stars and Jacksonville Suns were co-champions of the Southern League championship.

== Team changes ==
- The Chattanooga Lookouts moved from the West Division to the East Division.
- The Tennessee Smokies moved from the East Division to the West Division.
- The Jacksonville Suns ended their affiliation with the Detroit Tigers and began a new affiliation with the Los Angeles Dodgers.

== Teams ==
2001 Southern League
Division	Team	City	MLB Affiliate	Stadium
East	Carolina Mudcats	Zebulon, North Carolina	Colorado Rockies	Five County Stadium
East	Chattanooga Lookouts	Chattanooga, Tennessee	Cincinnati Reds	Bellsouth Park
East	Greenville Braves	Greenville, South Carolina	Atlanta Braves	Greenville Municipal Stadium
East	Jacksonville Suns	Jacksonville, Florida	Los Angeles Dodgers	Wolfson Park
East	Orlando Rays	Kissimmee, Florida	Tampa Bay Devil Rays	Cracker Jack Stadium
West	Birmingham Barons	Birmingham, Alabama	Chicago White Sox	Hoover Metropolitan Stadium
West	Huntsville Stars	Huntsville, Alabama	Milwaukee Brewers	Joe W. Davis Stadium
West	Mobile BayBears	Mobile, Alabama	San Diego Padres	Hank Aaron Stadium
West	Tennessee Smokies	Sevierville, Tennessee	Toronto Blue Jays	Smokies Park
West	West Tenn Diamond Jaxx	Jackson, Tennessee	Chicago Cubs	Pringles Park

== Map of teams ==
East Division West Division

== Regular season ==
=== Summary ===
- The Jacksonville Suns finished the season with the best record in the league for the first time since 1998.

=== Standings ===
East Division
Team	Win	Loss	%	GB
Jacksonville Suns	83	56	.597	–
Chattanooga Lookouts	72	67	.518	11
Carolina Mudcats	62	76	.449	20.5
Greenville Braves	60	79	.432	23
Orlando Rays	59	81	.421	24.5
West Division
Birmingham Barons	80	60	.571	–
Tennessee Smokies	80	60	.571	–
Huntsville Stars	75	63	.543	4
Mobile BayBears	65	73	.471	14
West Tenn Diamond Jaxx	59	80	.424	20.5

== League Leaders ==
=== Batting leaders ===
Stat	Player	Total
AVG	Ben Broussard, Chattanooga Lookouts	.320
H	Reed Johnson, Tennessee Smokies	174
R	Reed Johnson, Tennessee Smokies	104
2B	Josh Phelps, Tennessee Smokies	36
3B	Glenn Davis, Jacksonville Suns; Orlando Hudson, Tennessee Smokies	8
HR	Josh Phelps, Tennessee Smokies	31
RBI	Joe Borchard, Birmingham Barons	98
SB	Jorge Nuñez, Jacksonville Suns	44

=== Pitching leaders ===
Stat	Player	Total
W	Chris Baker, Tennessee Smokies; Mitch Wylie, Birmingham Barons	15
ERA	Steve Smyth, West Tenn Diamond Jaxx	2.54
CG	Chris Baker, Tennessee Smokies; Scott Cassidy, Tennessee Smokies	4
SHO	Scott Cassidy, Tennessee Smokies	3
SV	Edwin Almonte, Birmingham Barons	36
IP	Jim Magrane, Orlando Rays	182.0
SO	Nick Neugebauer, Huntsville Stars	149

== Playoffs ==
- Due to the September 11 attacks, the final round of the playoffs was canceled. The Huntsville Stars and Jacksonville Suns were declared co-champions.
- The Huntsville Stars won their third Southern League championship.
- The Jacksonville Suns won their second Southern League championship.

=== Playoff bracket ===
Division finals
E1	Jacksonville	3
E2	Chattanooga	2
W1	Birmingham	2
W2	Huntsville	3

Finals
E1	Jacksonville
W2	Huntsville

== Awards ==
Southern League awards
Award name	Recipient
Most Valuable Player	Josh Phelps, Tennessee Smokies
Pitcher of the Year	Chris Baker, Tennessee Smokies
Manager of the Year	John Shoemaker, Jacksonville Suns

== See also ==
- 2001 Major League Baseball season
