= 2002 Southern League season =

- League: Southern League
- Sport: Baseball
- Duration: April 4 – September 2
- Number of games: 140
- Number of teams: 10

Regular season
- League champions: Birmingham Barons
- Season MVP: Aaron Miles, Birmingham Barons

Playoffs
- League champions: Birmingham Barons
- Runners-up: Jacksonville Suns

SL seasons
- ← 2001 2003 →

The 2002 Southern League was a Class AA baseball season played between April 4 and September 2. Ten teams played a 140-game schedule, with the top team in each division in each half of the season qualifying for the post-season.

The Birmingham Barons won the Southern League championship, defeating the Jacksonville Suns in the playoffs.

== Team changes ==
- The Chattanooga Lookouts moved from the East Division to the West Division.
- The Tennessee Smokies moved from the West Division to the East Division.

== Teams ==
2002 Southern League
Division	Team	City	MLB Affiliate	Stadium
East	Carolina Mudcats	Zebulon, North Carolina	Colorado Rockies	Five County Stadium
East	Greenville Braves	Greenville, South Carolina	Atlanta Braves	Greenville Municipal Stadium
East	Jacksonville Suns	Jacksonville, Florida	Los Angeles Dodgers	Wolfson Park
East	Orlando Rays	Kissimmee, Florida	Tampa Bay Devil Rays	Cracker Jack Stadium
East	Tennessee Smokies	Sevierville, Tennessee	Toronto Blue Jays	Smokies Park
West	Birmingham Barons	Birmingham, Alabama	Chicago White Sox	Hoover Metropolitan Stadium
West	Chattanooga Lookouts	Chattanooga, Tennessee	Cincinnati Reds	Bellsouth Park
West	Huntsville Stars	Huntsville, Alabama	Milwaukee Brewers	Joe W. Davis Stadium
West	Mobile BayBears	Mobile, Alabama	San Diego Padres	Hank Aaron Stadium
West	West Tenn Diamond Jaxx	Jackson, Tennessee	Chicago Cubs	Pringles Park

== Map of teams ==
East Division West Division

== Regular season ==
=== Summary ===
- The Birmingham Barons finished the season with the best record in the league for the first time since 1993.

=== Standings ===
East Division
Team	Win	Loss	%	GB
Jacksonville Suns	77	62	.554	–
Tennessee Smokies	69	71	.493	8.5
Greenville Braves	65	69	.485	9.5
Carolina Mudcats	65	71	.478	10.5
Orlando Rays	58	79	.423	18
West Division
Birmingham Barons	79	61	.564	–
Mobile BayBears	76	63	.547	2.5
West Tenn Diamond Jaxx	73	67	.521	6
Huntsville Stars	70	69	.504	8.5
Chattanooga Lookouts	60	80	.429	19

== League Leaders ==
=== Batting leaders ===
Stat	Player	Total
AVG	Bobby Darula, Chattanooga Lookouts	.325
H	Aaron Miles, Birmingham Barons	171
R	Rich Thompson, Tennessee Smokies	109
2B	Aaron Miles, Birmingham Barons	39
3B	Miguel Olivo, Birmingham Barons	10
HR	David Kelton, West Tenn Diamond Jaxx; Pete Laforest, Orlando Rays	20
RBI	David Kelton, West Tenn Diamond Jaxx	79
SB	Bernie Castro, Mobile BayBears	53

=== Pitching leaders ===
Stat	Player	Total
W	Vinnie Chulk, Tennessee Smokies; Diego Markwell, Tennessee Smokies	13
ERA	Vinnie Chulk, Tennessee Smokies	2.96
CG	Brandon Backe, Orlando Rays; Peter Bauer, Tennessee Smokies	3
SHO	Aaron Cook, Carolina Mudcats	2
SV	Joe Valentine, Birmingham Barons	36
IP	Peter Bauer, Tennessee Smokies	177.0
SO	Matt Bruback, West Tenn Diamond Jaxx	158

== Playoffs ==
- The Birmingham Barons won their sixth Southern League championship, defeating the Jacksonville Suns in three games.

=== Playoff bracket ===
Division finals
E1	Jacksonville	3
E2	Carolina	2
W1	Birmingham	3
W2	West Tenn	2

Finals
E1	Jacksonville	0
W1	Birmingham	3

== Awards ==
Southern League awards
Award name	Recipient
Most Valuable Player	Aaron Miles, Birmingham Barons
Pitcher of the Year	Vinnie Chulk, Tennessee Smokies
Manager of the Year	Wally Backman, Birmingham Barons

== See also ==
- 2002 Major League Baseball season
