= 2004 Southern League season =

- League: Southern League
- Sport: Baseball
- Duration: April 8 – September 6
- Number of games: 140
- Number of teams: 10

Regular season
- League champions: Chattanooga Lookouts
- Season MVP: Richard Lewis, West Tenn Diamond Jaxx

Playoffs
- League champions: Mobile BayBears; Tennessee Smokies

SL seasons
- ← 2003 2005 →

The 2004 Southern League was a Class AA baseball season played between April 8 and September 6. Ten teams played a 140-game schedule, with the top team in each division in each half of the season qualifying for the post-season.

The Mobile BayBears and Tennessee Smokies were co-champions of the Southern League championship.

== Team changes ==
- The Orlando Rays relocated to Montgomery, Alabama and were renamed to the Montgomery Biscuits. The club moved from the East Division to the West Division. They remained affiliated with the Tampa Bay Devil Rays.
- The Chattanooga Lookouts moved from the West Division to the East Division.

== Teams ==
2004 Southern League
Division	Team	City	MLB Affiliate	Stadium
East	Carolina Mudcats	Zebulon, North Carolina	Florida Marlins	Five County Stadium
East	Chattanooga Lookouts	Chattanooga, Tennessee	Cincinnati Reds	Bellsouth Park
East	Greenville Braves	Greenville, South Carolina	Atlanta Braves	Greenville Municipal Stadium
East	Jacksonville Suns	Jacksonville, Florida	Los Angeles Dodgers	Baseball Grounds of Jacksonville
East	Tennessee Smokies	Sevierville, Tennessee	St. Louis Cardinals	Smokies Park
West	Birmingham Barons	Birmingham, Alabama	Chicago White Sox	Hoover Metropolitan Stadium
West	Huntsville Stars	Huntsville, Alabama	Milwaukee Brewers	Joe W. Davis Stadium
West	Mobile BayBears	Mobile, Alabama	San Diego Padres	Hank Aaron Stadium
West	Montgomery Biscuits	Montgomery, Alabama	Tampa Bay Devil Rays	Montgomery Riverwalk Stadium
West	West Tenn Diamond Jaxx	Jackson, Tennessee	Chicago Cubs	Pringles Park

== Map of teams ==
East Division West Division

== Regular season ==
=== Summary ===
- The Chattanooga Lookouts finished the season with the best record in the league for the first time in franchise history.

=== Standings ===
East Division
Team	Win	Loss	%	GB
Chattanooga Lookouts	87	53	.621	–
Carolina Mudcats	73	66	.525	13.5
Tennessee Smokies	69	71	.493	18
Jacksonville Suns	66	71	.482	19.5
Greenville Braves	63	76	.453	23.5
West Division
Birmingham Barons	73	66	.525	–
Mobile BayBears	73	67	.521	0.5
West Tenn Diamond Jaxx	70	68	.507	2.5
Huntsville Stars	65	75	.464	8.5
Montgomery Biscuits	57	83	.407	16.5

== League Leaders ==
=== Batting leaders ===
Stat	Player	Total
AVG	Napoleon Calzado, Greenville Braves	.359
H	Skip Schumaker, Tennessee Smokies	163
R	Michael Spidale, Birmingham Barons	87
2B	Edwin Encarnación, Chattanooga Lookouts; Kelly Johnson, Greenville Braves; Rickie Weeks Jr., Huntsville Stars	35
3B	Dwaine Bacon, West Tenn Diamond Jaxx	11
HR	Greg Sain, Mobile BayBears	28
RBI	Josh Barfield, Mobile BayBears	90
SB	Dwaine Bacon, West Tenn Diamond Jaxx	60

=== Pitching leaders ===
Stat	Player	Total
W	Steve Kelly, Chattanooga Lookouts; Heath Phillips, Birmingham Barons	12
ERA	Renyel Pinto, West Tenn Diamond Jaxx	2.92
CG	Bobby Brownlie, West Tenn Diamond Jaxx; Jason Cromer, Montgomery Biscuits; Jeremy Cummings, Tennessee Smokies; Clay Hensley, Mobile BayBears; Brad Thompson, Tennessee Smokies	2
SHO	Brad Thompson, Tennessee Smokies	2
SV	Brad Baker, Mobile BayBears	30
IP	Steve Kelly, Chattanooga Lookouts; Nic Ungs, Carolina Mudcats	161.1
SO	Renyel Pinto, West Tenn Diamond Jaxx	179

== Playoffs ==
- Due to Hurricane Ivan, the final round of the playoffs was canceled. The Mobile BayBears and Tennessee Smokies were declared co-champions.
- The Mobile BayBears won their second Southern League championship.
- The Tennessee Smokies won their third Southern League championship.

=== Playoff bracket ===
Division finals
E1	Chattanooga	1
E2	Tennessee	3
W1	Birmingham	1
W2	Mobile	3

Finals
E2	Tennessee
W2	Mobile

== Awards ==
Southern League awards
Award name	Recipient
Most Valuable Player	Richard Lewis, West Tenn Diamond Jaxx
Pitcher of the Year	Brad Baker, Mobile BayBears
Manager of the Year	Jayhawk Owens, Chattanooga Lookouts

== See also ==
- 2004 Major League Baseball season
