= 1998 Southern League season =

- League: Southern League
- Sport: Baseball
- Duration: April 2 – September 7
- Number of games: 140
- Number of teams: 10

Regular season
- League champions: Jacksonville Suns; Mobile BayBears
- Season MVP: Gabe Kapler, Jacksonville Suns

Playoffs
- League champions: Mobile BayBears
- Runners-up: Jacksonville Suns

SL seasons
- ← 1997 1999 →

The 1998 Southern League was a Class AA baseball season played between April 2 and September 7. Ten teams played a 140-game schedule, with the top team in each division in each half of the season qualifying for the post-season.

The Mobile BayBears won the Southern League championship, as they defeated the Jacksonville Suns in the playoffs.

== Team changes ==
- The Southern League relocated to Jackson, Tennessee and were renamed to the West Tenn Diamond Jaxx. The club ended their affiliation with the Seattle Mariners and began a new affiliation with the Chicago Cubs.
- The Orlando Rays ended their affiliation with the Chicago Cubs and began a new affiliation with the Seattle Mariners.

== Teams ==
1998 Southern League
Division	Team	City	MLB Affiliate	Stadium
East	Carolina Mudcats	Zebulon, North Carolina	Pittsburgh Pirates	Five County Stadium
East	Greenville Braves	Greenville, South Carolina	Atlanta Braves	Greenville Municipal Stadium
East	Jacksonville Suns	Jacksonville, Florida	Detroit Tigers	Wolfson Park
East	Knoxville Smokies	Knoxville, Tennessee	Toronto Blue Jays	Bill Meyer Stadium
East	Orlando Rays	Orlando, Florida	Seattle Mariners	Tinker Field
West	Birmingham Barons	Birmingham, Alabama	Chicago White Sox	Hoover Metropolitan Stadium
West	Chattanooga Lookouts	Chattanooga, Tennessee	Cincinnati Reds	Engel Stadium
West	Huntsville Stars	Huntsville, Alabama	Oakland Athletics	Joe W. Davis Stadium
West	Mobile BayBears	Mobile, Alabama	San Diego Padres	Hank Aaron Stadium
West	West Tenn Diamond Jaxx	Jackson, Tennessee	Chicago Cubs	Pringles Park

== Map of teams ==
East Division West Division

== Regular season ==
=== Summary ===
- The Jacksonville Suns and Mobile BayBears finished the season with the best record in the league. This was the first time for the Suns since 1987 and the first time for the BayBears in team history.

=== Standings ===
East Division
Team	Win	Loss	%	GB
Jacksonville Suns	86	54	.614	–
Knoxville Smokies	71	69	.507	15
Orlando Rays	67	71	.486	18
Greenville Braves	67	72	.482	18.5
Carolina Mudcats	59	80	.424	26.5
West Division
Mobile BayBears	86	54	.614	–
Huntsville Stars	72	68	.514	14
West Tenn Diamond Jaxx	66	74	.471	20
Chattanooga Lookouts	65	73	.471	20
Birmingham Barons	58	82	.414	28

== League Leaders ==
=== Batting leaders ===
Stat	Player	Total
AVG	Jason LaRue, Chattanooga Lookouts	.365
H	Gabe Kapler, Jacksonville Suns	176
R	Gabe Kapler, Jacksonville Suns	113
2B	Robert Fick, Jacksonville Suns; Gabe Kapler, Jacksonville Suns	47
3B	Bo Porter, West Tenn Diamond Jaxx	11
HR	Gabe Kapler, Jacksonville Suns	28
RBI	Gabe Kapler, Jacksonville Suns	146
SB	Bo Porter, West Tenn Diamond Jaxx	50

=== Pitching leaders ===
Stat	Player	Total
W	Dave Borkowski, Jacksonville Suns	16
ERA	Bryan Wolff, Mobile BayBears	2.29
CG	Brian McNichol, West Tenn Diamond Jaxx; Jason Olsen, Birmingham Barons	4
SHO	Tim Harikkala, Orlando Rays; Bryan Wolff, Mobile BayBears	2
SV	Sean Spencer, Orlando Rays	18
IP	Buddy Carlyle, Mobile / Chattanooga	188.2
SO	Brian McNichol, West Tenn Diamond Jaxx	168

== Playoffs ==
- The Mobile BayBears won their first Southern League championship, defeating the Jacksonville Suns in four games.

=== Playoff bracket ===
Division finals
E1	Jacksonville	3
E2	Knoxville	0
W1	Mobile	3
W2	Huntsville	0

Finals
E1	Jacksonville	1
W1	Mobile	3

== Awards ==
Southern League awards
Award name	Recipient
Most Valuable Player	Gabe Kapler, Jacksonville Suns
Pitcher of the Year	Bruce Chen, Greenville Braves
Manager of the Year	Mike Ramsey, Mobile BayBears

== See also ==
- 1998 Major League Baseball season
