= 2003 Southern League season =

- League: Southern League
- Sport: Baseball
- Duration: April 3 – September 1
- Number of games: 140
- Number of teams: 10

Regular season
- League champions: Carolina Mudcats
- Season MVP: Corey Hart, Huntsville Stars

Playoffs
- League champions: Carolina Mudcats
- Runners-up: Huntsville Stars

SL seasons
- ← 2002 2004 →

The 2003 Southern League was a Class AA baseball season played between April 3 and September 1. Ten teams played a 140-game schedule, with the top team in each division in each half of the season qualifying for the post-season.

The Carolina Mudcats won the Southern League championship, defeating the Huntsville Stars in the playoffs.

== Team changes ==
- The Carolina Mudcats ended their affiliation with the Colorado Rockies and began a new affiliation with the Florida Marlins.
- The Tennessee Smokies ended their affiliation with the Toronto Blue Jays and began a new affiliation with the St. Louis Cardinals.

== Teams ==
2003 Southern League
Division	Team	City	MLB Affiliate	Stadium
East	Carolina Mudcats	Zebulon, North Carolina	Florida Marlins	Five County Stadium
East	Greenville Braves	Greenville, South Carolina	Atlanta Braves	Greenville Municipal Stadium
East	Jacksonville Suns	Jacksonville, Florida	Los Angeles Dodgers	Baseball Grounds of Jacksonville
East	Orlando Rays	Kissimmee, Florida	Tampa Bay Devil Rays	Cracker Jack Stadium
East	Tennessee Smokies	Sevierville, Tennessee	St. Louis Cardinals	Smokies Park
West	Birmingham Barons	Birmingham, Alabama	Chicago White Sox	Hoover Metropolitan Stadium
West	Chattanooga Lookouts	Chattanooga, Tennessee	Cincinnati Reds	Bellsouth Park
West	Huntsville Stars	Huntsville, Alabama	Milwaukee Brewers	Joe W. Davis Stadium
West	Mobile BayBears	Mobile, Alabama	San Diego Padres	Hank Aaron Stadium
West	West Tenn Diamond Jaxx	Jackson, Tennessee	Chicago Cubs	Pringles Park

== Map of teams ==
East Division West Division

== Regular season ==
=== Summary ===
- The Carolina Mudcats finished the season with the best record in the league for the first time since 1995.

=== Standings ===
East Division
Team	Win	Loss	%	GB
Carolina Mudcats	80	58	.580	–
Tennessee Smokies	72	67	.518	8.5
Greenville Braves	68	70	.493	12
Jacksonville Suns	66	73	.475	14.5
Orlando Rays	65	72	.474	14.5
West Division
Huntsville Stars	75	63	.543	–
Birmingham Barons	73	64	.533	1.5
Chattanooga Lookouts	66	74	.471	10
West Tenn Diamond Jaxx	65	73	.471	10
Mobile BayBears	61	77	.442	14

== League Leaders ==
=== Batting leaders ===
Stat	Player	Total
AVG	Chris Aguila, Carolina Mudcats	.321
H	Corey Hart, Huntsville Stars	149
R	Bucky Jacobsen, Tennessee Smokies	84
2B	Corey Hart, Huntsville Stars	40
3B	Dave Krynzel, Huntsville Stars	11
HR	Bucky Jacobsen, Tennessee Smokies	31
RBI	Corey Hart, Huntsville Stars	94
SB	Billy Hall, Carolina Mudcats	45

=== Pitching leaders ===
Stat	Player	Total
W	Enemencio Pacheo, Birmingham Barons; Cory Stewart, Mobile BayBears	12
ERA	Neal Cotts, Birmingham Barons	2.16
CG	Scott Autrey, Orlando Rays; Dan Curtis, Greenville Braves; Josh Hall, Chattanooga Lookouts; Jon Switzer, Orlando Rays; Heath Totten, Jacksonville Suns	2
SHO	Donnie Bridges, Carolina Mudcats; Dan Curtis, Greenville Braves; Chad Gaudin, Orlando Rays; Jon Leicester, West Tenn Diamond Jaxx; Jason Shelley, Huntsville Stars; Heath Totten, Jacksonville Suns; José Veras, Orlando Rays	1
SV	Mike Lyons, Tennessee Smokies	31
IP	Heath Totten, Jacksonville Suns	181.1
SO	Mike Nannini, West Tenn Diamond Jaxx	158

== Playoffs ==
- The Carolina Mudcats won their second Southern League championship, defeating the Huntsville Stars in three games.

=== Playoff bracket ===
Division finals
E1	Carolina	3
E2	Tennessee	1
W1	Huntsville	3
W2	Birmingham	2

Finals
E1	Carolina	3
W1	Huntsville	0

== Awards ==
Southern League awards
Award name	Recipient
Most Valuable Player	Corey Hart, Huntsville Stars
Pitcher of the Year	Joel Hanrahan, Jacksonville Suns
Manager of the Year	Frank Kremblas, Huntsville Stars

== See also ==
- 2003 Major League Baseball season
