= 1987 Southern League season =

- League: Southern League
- Sport: Baseball
- Duration: April 8 – September 1
- Number of games: 144
- Number of teams: 10

Regular season
- League champions: Jacksonville Expos
- Season MVP: Tom Dodd, Charlotte Orioles

Playoffs
- League champions: Birmingham Barons
- Runners-up: Charlotte Orioles

SL seasons
- ← 1986 1988 →

The 1987 Southern League was a Class AA baseball season played between April 8 and September 1. Ten teams played a 144-game schedule, with the top team in each division in each half of the season qualifying for the post-season.

The Birmingham Barons won the Southern League championship, as they defeated the Charlotte Orioles in the playoffs.

== Teams ==
1987 Southern League
Division	Team	City	MLB Affiliate	Stadium
East	Charlotte Orioles	Charlotte, North Carolina	Baltimore Orioles	Jim Crockett Memorial Park
East	Columbus Astros	Columbus, Georgia	Houston Astros	Golden Park
East	Greenville Braves	Greenville, South Carolina	Atlanta Braves	Greenville Municipal Stadium
East	Jacksonville Expos	Jacksonville, Florida	Montreal Expos	Wolfson Park
East	Orlando Twins	Orlando, Florida	Minnesota Twins	Tinker Field
West	Birmingham Barons	Birmingham, Alabama	Chicago White Sox	Rickwood Field
West	Chattanooga Lookouts	Chattanooga, Tennessee	Seattle Mariners	Engel Stadium
West	Huntsville Stars	Huntsville, Alabama	Oakland Athletics	Joe W. Davis Stadium
West	Knoxville Blue Jays	Knoxville, Tennessee	Toronto Blue Jays	Bill Meyer Stadium
West	Memphis Chicks	Memphis, Tennessee	Kansas City Royals	Tim McCarver Stadium

== Map of teams ==
East Division West Division

== Regular season ==
=== Summary ===
- The Jacksonville Expos finished the season with the best record in the league for the first time since 1982.

=== Standings ===
East Division
Team	Win	Loss	%	GB
Jacksonville Expos	85	59	.590	–
Charlotte Orioles	85	60	.586	0.5
Greenville Braves	70	74	.486	15
Columbus Astros	67	76	.469	17.5
Orlando Twins	61	82	.427	23.5
West Division
Huntsville Stars	74	70	.514	–
Memphis Chicks	72	71	.503	1.5
Birmingham Barons	68	75	.476	5.5
Chattanooga Lookouts	68	75	.476	5.5
Knoxville Blue Jays	68	76	.472	6

== League Leaders ==
=== Batting leaders ===
Stat	Player	Total
AVG	Dave Myers, Chattanooga Lookouts	.328
H	Dave Myers, Chattanooga Lookouts	160
R	Bernie Tatis, Knoxville Blue Jays	101
2B	Joe Xavier, Huntsville Stars	37
3B	Jim Eisenreich, Memphis Chicks; Eric Fox, Chattanooga Lookouts	10
HR	Rondal Rollin, Birmingham Barons	39
RBI	Tom Dodd, Charlotte Orioles	127
SB	Bernie Tatis, Knoxville Blue Jays	55

=== Pitching leaders ===
Stat	Player	Total
W	John Trautwein, Jacksonville Expos	15
ERA	Brian Holman, Jacksonville Expos	2.50
CG	Brian Holman, Jacksonville Expos	6
SHO	Jeff Bumgarner, Orlando Twins; Wally Whitehurst, Huntsville Stars	3
SV	Kevin Price, Jacksonville Expos	19
IP	José Mesa, Knoxville Blue Jays	193.1
SO	Randy Johnson, Jacksonville Expos	163

== Playoffs ==
- The Birmingham Barons won their third Southern League championship, defeating the Charlotte Orioles in four games.

=== Playoff bracket ===
Division finals
E1	Jacksonville	2
E2	Charlotte	3
W1	Huntsville	0
W2	Birmingham	3

Finals
E2	Charlotte	1
W2	Birmingham	3

== Awards ==
Southern League awards
Award name	Recipient
Most Valuable Player	Tom Dodd, Charlotte Orioles
Pitcher of the Year	Brian Holman, Jacksonville Expos
Manager of the Year	Tommy Thompson, Jacksonville Expos

== See also ==
- 1987 Major League Baseball season
