= Dave Myers (baseball) =

American baseball player and scout (born 1959)

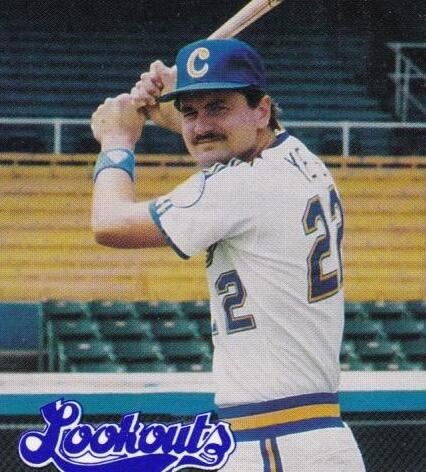
- Myers with the Chattanooga Lookouts c. 1987
- Infielder / Coach
- Born: August 8, 1959 (age 67); York, Pennsylvania
- Bats: Right Throws: Right
- Stats at Baseball Reference

Teams
- as Coach: Seattle Mariners (2001–2004)

David K. Myers (born August 8, 1959) is an American professional baseball scout. He is also a former minor league infielder, minor league manager, and a coach with the Seattle Mariners of Major League Baseball (MLB).

== Playing career ==
Myers graduated from William Penn Senior High School in York, Pennsylvania, where he was a two-sport standout in baseball and basketball. He then attended Temple University, where he played for Temple Owls. He was teammates with future MLB pitcher Pete Filson. The New York Yankees selected Myers in the 27th round of the 1980 MLB draft, but he did not sign with the team. Myers was named the East Coast Conference most valuable player in 1981.

The Seattle Mariners selected Myers in the 13th round with the 312th overall selection in the 1981 MLB draft. He played eight seasons of Minor League Baseball in the Seattle system, including four years in Double-A. As a minor leaguer, Myers appeared in 795 games, compiling a .272 batting average with 26 home runs and 348 RBIs. Defensively, he played mostly as a shortstop, while appearing at all other infield positions as well as in the outfield and at catcher. He also pitched a total of 7 1/3 innings in five games.

== Managing and coaching career ==
Myers began his coaching career in the Mariners' minor league system with the Double-A Vermont Mariners in 1988. He then managed farm clubs for 12 seasons, from 1989 to 2000, the last five with the Triple-A Tacoma Rainiers. He then joined the major league staff of Lou Piniella for the 2001 Mariners. In his first season as the Mariners' third-base coach, Seattle won an American League-record 116 games. Myers coached Seattle through the 2004 season, also instructing the team's infielders. In 2006, he managed a final season in the minor leagues with the Everett AquaSox, Seattle's Class A Short Season affiliate. During his 13 seasons as a minor league manager, his teams hadd a 762–699 record, for a .522 winning percentage.

Myers coached in the Cleveland Indians' organization after leaving the Mariners. He spent 2010–2015 as a coach for the Durham Bulls, the Triple-A International League affiliate of the Tampa Bay Rays. He then became a professional scout for the Rays, based in Seattle.

== Personal life ==
Myers is married and has two children.

Preceded by Franchise established	Port City Roosters manager 1995	Succeeded by Orlando Gómez
Preceded by Steve Smith	Tacoma Rainiers manager 1996–2000	Succeeded by Dan Rohn
Preceded by Larry Bowa	Seattle Mariners third base coach 2001–2004	Succeeded by Jeff Newman
