= David Kelton =

American baseball player (born 1979)

- Left fielder
- Born: December 17, 1979 (age 45); Dothan, Alabama, U.S.
- Batted: Right Threw: Right

MLB debut
- June 8, 2003, for the Chicago Cubs

Last MLB appearance
- June 10, 2004, for the Chicago Cubs

MLB statistics
- Batting average: .136
- Home runs: 0
- Runs batted in: 1

Teams
- Chicago Cubs (2003–2004)

David Wayne Kelton (born December 17, 1979) is a former Major League Baseball player for the Chicago Cubs. He batted and threw right-handed.

== Career ==
Kelton was raised in LaGrange, Georgia and graduated from Troup County High School in 1998 and was drafted by the Chicago Cubs in the 2nd round. It is likely he fell out of the 1st round because of shoulder surgery. He spent 8 years with the Cubs organization. The last 3 of those years were in Triple-A Iowa. While in the Cubs organization, Kelton spent 3 months in the big leagues. He got his first call up when Sammy Sosa was suspended for the corked bat incident. Then again when Sosa had a back spasm because of a sneeze. Kelton was a third baseman for the first 5 years of his minor league career, but due to shoulder problems played first and outfield for the remainder of his career.

He received a big league invitation to spring training with the Atlanta Braves and played in Triple-A Richmond for the 2006 season. He retired after the 2006 season.

Kelton is currently coaching baseball at Lagrange College in Georgia.
