= David Manning (baseball) =

American baseball player (born 1972)

- Pitcher
- Born: August 14, 1972 (age 53); Buffalo, New York, U.S.
- Batted: Right Threw: Right

MLB debut
- August 2, 2003, for the Milwaukee Brewers

Last MLB appearance
- August 9, 2003, for the Milwaukee Brewers

MLB statistics
- Win–loss record: 0–2
- Earned run average: 16.20
- Strikeouts: 2

CPBL statistics
- Win–loss record: 0–0
- Earned run average: 5.87
- Strikeouts: 5
- Stats at Baseball Reference

Teams
- Milwaukee Brewers (2003); La New Bears (2004); Brother Elephants (2007)

David Anthony Manning (born August 14, 1972) is an American former starting pitcher in Major League Baseball who played for the Milwaukee Brewers in 2003.

== Career ==
Manning was selected by the Texas Rangers in the third round of the 1992 MLB draft out of the Palm Beach State College, where he pitched for the Panthers school team.

Manning spent 15 years in Minor, independent and foreign leagues which included stints with 24 different teams in 17 leagues, four countries and five Major League organizations.
