= Dave Bialas =

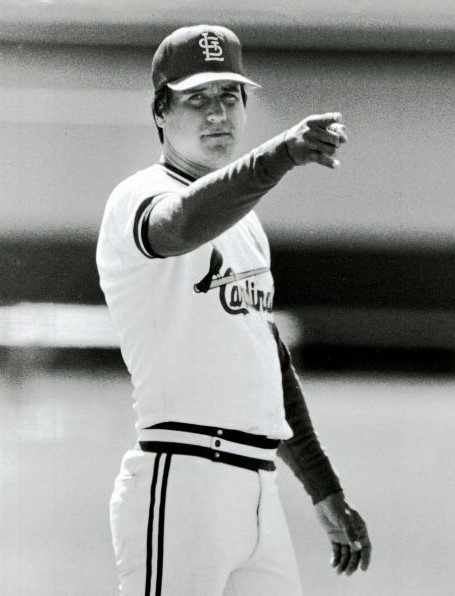
- Bialas in 1985
- Coach
- Born: February 6, 1954 (age 72); Houston, Texas, U.S.
- Bats: Right Throws: Right
- Stats at Baseball Reference

Teams
- Chicago Cubs (1995–1999, 2002)

David Bruce Bialas (born February 6, 1954) is an American former minor league baseball player and is currently the manager of the New York Yankees Class A Minor League Short Season team in Staten Island, New York and Major League Baseball coach. He served as a coach for the Chicago Cubs from 1995 through 1999 and in 2002. As a minor league outfielder and first baseman in the St. Louis Cardinals system, Bialas played 1021 games from 1973 through 1982, batting .274 in 3448 at bats, with 36 home runs, 214 RBIs and 263 runs scored. As a minor league manager in the Cardinals' and Cubs' systems, he managed 1373 games, winning 711 and losing 662 for a winning percentage of .518. On November 1, 2012, the Atlanta Braves announced Bialas as their next minor league fielding coordinator, replacing Dave Trembley.

Bialas was born in Houston, Texas and is a graduate of Bellaire High School in nearby Bellaire, Texas.
