= Jackson Generals =

- 1998–2020; Jackson, Tennessee
Team logo
Cap insignia

Minor league affiliations
- Class: Double-A (1998–2020)
- League: Southern League (1998–2020)

Major league affiliations
- Team: Arizona Diamondbacks (2017–2020); Seattle Mariners (2007–2016); Chicago Cubs (1998–2006)

Minor league titles
- League titles (4): 2000; 2016; 2018; 2019
- Division titles (7): 1999; 2000; 2005; 2012; 2016; 2018; 2019
- First-half titles (6): 1999; 2005; 2008; 2012; 2016; 2018
- Second-half titles (4): 1999; 2000; 2002; 2005

Team data
- Name: Jackson Generals (2011–2020); West Tenn Diamond Jaxx (1998–2010)
- Colors: Green, black, white, tan
- Mascot: Sarge the Bulldog
- Ballpark: The Ballpark at Jackson (1998–2020)

The Jackson Generals were a professional baseball team located in Jackson, Tennessee. From 1998 to 2020, they were a part of Minor League Baseball's Southern League (SL) as the Double-A affiliate of the Chicago Cubs (1998–2006), Seattle Mariners (2007–2016), and Arizona Diamondbacks (2017–2020). Known as the West Tenn Diamond Jaxx from 1998 to 2010, the team borrowed its Generals moniker from the original Jackson Generals in 2011. They played their home games at The Ballpark at Jackson, which opened in 1998.

Jackson served as a farm club for three Major League Baseball franchises. Over 22 years of competition, the Generals have played in 3,053 regular season games and compiled a 1,553–1,500 win–loss record. They have qualified for the postseason on 10 occasions, winning 7 division titles and 4 Southern League championships. The team's first came in 2000 as the Double-A affiliate of the Chicago Cubs. They won a second in 2016 while affiliated with the Seattle Mariners. Their two most-recent titles were won back-to-back in 2018 and 2019 with the Arizona Diamondbacks. Jackson has a postseason record of 39–31. Combining all 3,123 regular season and postseason games, the Generals have an all-time record of 1,592–1,531.

== History ==
=== Prior professional baseball in Jackson ===
Professional baseball was first played in Jackson, Tennessee, in 1903 by the Jackson Railroaders of the Kentucky–Illinois–Tennessee League. They were followed in the KITTY League by the Jackson Climbers in 1911 and the Jackson Blue Jays in 1924. The Blue Jays moved to the Tri-State League in 1925 as the Jackson Giants and became the Jackson Jays in 1926. The original Jackson Generals played in the KITTY League from 1935 to 1942 and 1950 to 1954. Jackson went without a team for the next 42 years.

=== Chicago Cubs (1998–2006) ===
The West Tenn Diamond Jaxx' logo (2002–2010)

Following the 1997 season, the Southern League's Memphis Chicks relocated from nearby Memphis, to Jackson as the West Tenn Diamond Jaxx. The team's nickname was selected from over 1,500 suggestions submitted to The Jackson Sun in a name-the-team contest. The winning entry, "Diamond Jacks", was inspired by a diamond shape on the contest entry blank. This was modified to "Diamond Jaxx" and paired with "West Tenn", short for "West Tennessee" in which Jackson is located. The Diamond Jaxx became the Double-A affiliate of the Chicago Cubs. The team would play their home games at the newly constructed 6,000-seat Pringles Park, which cost approximately US$8 million.

The West Tenn Diamond Jaxx opened their inaugural season on the road against the Jacksonville Suns on April 2, 1998, at Wolfson Park in Jacksonville, Florida, winning 6–4. They played their home opener on April 16 before a sellout crowd of 6,054 people at Pringles Park. Tied 4–4 in the bottom of the ninth inning with the bases loaded, Jackson's Terry Joseph was hit by a pitch forcing in the winning run in the 5–4 victory. Managed by Dave Trembley, the Diamond Jaxx ended their first season in fourth place in the Western Division with a 66–74 record.

Jackson hosted the 1999 Southern League All-Star Game on June 23. In the midsummer contest, the Western Division All-Stars defeated the Eastern Division, 5–2, with 4,169 in attendance. On July 22, David Manning pitched a no-hitter against Jacksonville at Pringles Park, a 1–0 win. The Diamond Jaxx won both the First and Second Half Western Division titles that season, with a league-leading 84–57 record, qualifying for the postseason playoffs. They won the division title by defeating the Chattanooga Lookouts, 3–1, in a best-of-five series. They were, however, defeated in finals by the Orlando Rays, 3–1. Trembley was selected for the Southern League Manager of the Year Award.

The Diamond Jaxx returned to the postseason in 2000 under the leadership of Manager of the Year Dave Bialas after winning the second half and posting a league-best 80–58 mark. They won the Western Division title versus the Birmingham Barons, 3–2, then won their first Southern League championship by defeating Jacksonville, 3–2.

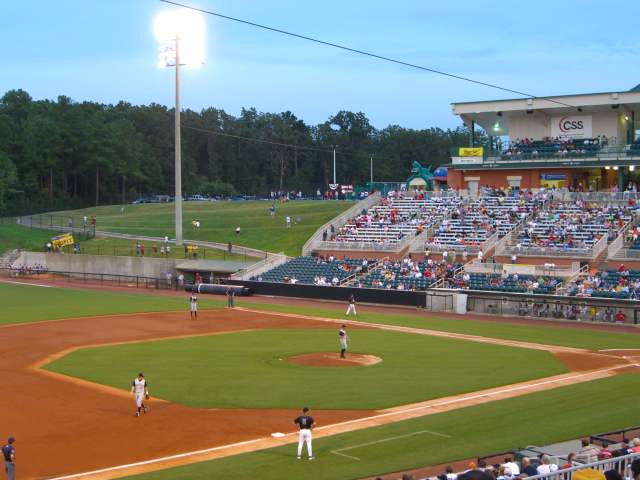
A Diamond Jaxx game at Pringles Park in 2005

They won another second half title in 2002, but were eliminated in the Western Division series by Birmingham, 3–2. Jackson missed the playoffs for the next two seasons, including the 2004 campaign in which second baseman Richard Lewis won the Southern League Most Valuable Player Award. They won both halves of the 2005 season and won the Northern Division title versus the Carolina Mudcats, 3–0, but lost the championship to Jacksonville, 3–1. Jackson led the league with an 83–56 record. Ricky Nolasco was selected for the 2005 Southern League Most Outstanding Pitcher Award.

At the 2006 Southern League All-Star Game, Jackson third baseman Scott Moore was selected as the game's MVP. Following the 2006 season, the Chicago Cubs ended their nine-year affiliation with the Diamond Jaxx, citing poor attendance and a desire for their Double-A players to compete before larger audiences. Jackson had a composite record of 655–598 through nine seasons with the Cubs.

=== Seattle Mariners (2007–2016) ===
The Diamond Jaxx entered into an affiliation with the Seattle Mariners in 2007. The finished that season with a 60–79 record. In October 2007, team owners Lozinak Baseball Properties entered into an agreement to sell the Diamond Jaxx to a group of Middle Tennessee-based investors headed by Reese Smith III and David Freeman. The new owners planned to keep the team in Jackson and sought to improve attendance. The sale was approved at the Winter Meetings that December.

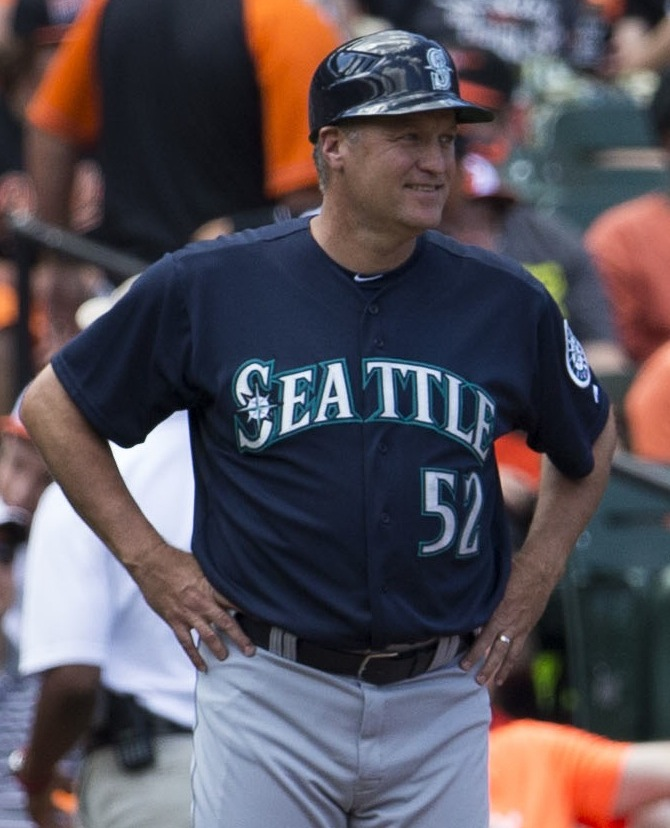
Daren Brown led the Generals to win the 2016 Southern League championship.

Jackson won the First Half Northern Division title in 2008, but lost the division series to Carolina, 3–0. The 2010 team, lost the Northern Division title to the Tennessee Smokies, winners of both halves, 3–1.

During the 2010 playoffs, the team announced plans to rebrand for the 2011 season by becoming the Jackson Generals. The moniker was previously used by the original Jackson Generals, who represented the city in the Kentucky–Illinois–Tennessee League from 1935 to 1942 and 1950 to 1954. The Generals hosted their second Southern League All-Star Game on June 21, 2011. The North Division All-Stars defeated the South Division, 6–3, before a crowd of 5,516 at Pringles Park.

After missing the playoffs in 2011, the 2012 Generals won the First Half Northern Division title and posted a league-leading 79–61 record. They then defeated the Chattanooga Lookouts, 3–1, to advance to their first league championship series since 2005. They lost the finals to the Mobile BayBears, 3–1. Brandon Maurer was selected as the season's Most Outstanding Pitcher. Losing campaigns from 2013 to 2015, including a franchise-low 53–84 (.387) record in 2015, kept the Generals from the playoffs for three consecutive years, the longest postseason drought in franchise history.

The 2016 Generals, managed by Daren Brown, led the league with a franchise-best 84–55 (.604) mark, winning the first half title. They won the Northern Division title against the Montgomery Biscuits, 3–1, before winning their second Southern League crown over the Mississippi Braves, 3–0. Jackson swept the Southern League awards with outfielder Tyler O'Neill winning the MVP Award, Ryan Yarbrough as the Most Outstanding Pitcher, and Brown winning the Manager of the Year Award.

The Generals ended their affiliation with the Seattle Mariners after the playoffs, intending to partner with a new major league team. Over 10 years as a Mariners affiliate, the Diamond Jaxx/Generals accumulated a record of 674–712. Over all 19 years in Jackson, the team had an all-time record of 1,329–1,310.

=== Arizona Diamondbacks (2017–2020) ===
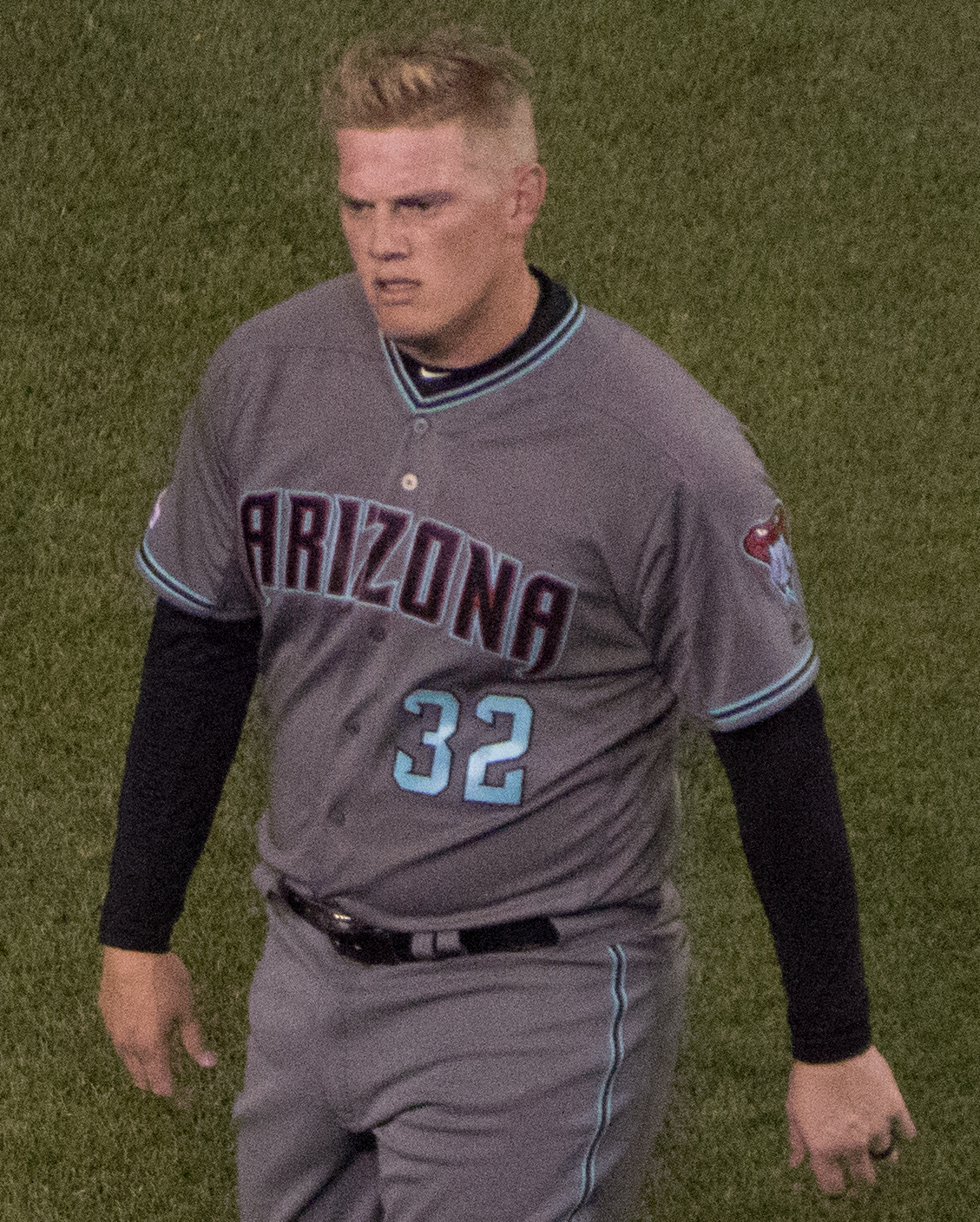
Kevin Cron won the 2017 Southern League MVP Award.

The Generals next affiliated with the Arizona Diamondbacks in a player development contract that began with the 2017 season. They missed the playoffs in their first season with Arizona, but first baseman Kevin Cron won the league's Most Valuable Player Award. On June 14, 2018, five Generals combined to pitch a no-hitter against Jacksonville on the road. Justin Donatella (3 innings pitched), Daniel Gibson (2 IP), Kirby Bellow (1 IP), Kevin Ginkel (2 IP), and Brad Goldberg (1 IP) held the Suns hitless for nine innings in the 6–0 win. The team went on to win back-to-back Southern League championships in 2018 and 2019. Jackson won the 2018 first half, defeated Montgomery, 3–2, for the Northern Division title, then won the franchise's third league title with a 3–1 series win over the Biloxi Shuckers.

The 2019 team did not win either half of the season, but received a postseason berth with the Northern Division's second-best overall record. Similar to the previous year, the Generals bested the Biscuits, 3–1 in the division series, then won their fourth Southern League championship versus the Shuckers, 3–2.

The start of the 2020 season was postponed due to the COVID-19 pandemic before ultimately being cancelled on June 30. Jackson was scheduled to host the 2020 Southern League All-Star Game at The Ballpark at Jackson, but it was cancelled earlier on May 19.

Through three years of affiliation with Arizona, the Generals' record was 224–190. Over all 22 years of competition, they had an all-time record of 1,553–1,500.

In conjunction with Major League Baseball's reorganization of the minor leagues after the 2020 season, the Generals were not invited to serve as any team's affiliate, effectively ending their affiliation with the Diamondbacks and their run in affiliated baseball. The future of the team is uncertain. While Major League Baseball has stated its intentions to assist cities like Jackson in joining independent baseball leagues, the team's lease requires them to maintain a Class A, Double-A, or Triple-A affiliation to remain at their ballpark.

With no team lined up for 2021, the Generals agreed to operate The Ballpark at Jackson as a temporary home for the Winnipeg Goldeyes, an independent American Association team based in Winnipeg, Manitoba, Canada, which was displaced due to COVID-19 travel restrictions. However, Jackson Mayor Scott Conger notified the teams that the Generals lost their authority to manage the city-owned ballpark when they lost their affiliation with Minor League Baseball and that they were issued an eviction notice to leave the stadium after May 30, nine days after the Goldeyes' May 21 home opener. On June 1, the Goldeyes entered into a new license agreement with the city to continue use of the facility. Meanwhile, the Generals and the City of Jackson went to an arbiter to decide which party had legal control of the stadium. The arbiter ruled in favor of the city, determining the Generals' lease to be invalid after the loss of its affiliation and requiring the team to vacate the ballpark. The city plans to host a team of the collegiate summer Prospect League in 2023. The team will be called the Jackson Rockabillys.

== Season-by-season results ==
Jackson's best season record occurred in 2016, when they finished 84–55 (.604) as an affiliate of the Seattle Mariners. Their lowest season record has been 53–84 (.387) in 2015, also as a Mariners affiliate. Of the three Major League Baseball teams with which Jackson has been affiliated, they have experienced their best record with the Arizona Diamondbacks from 2017 to 2020. The team has a composite regular season record of 224–190 (.541). They have reached the postseason on two occasions, winning two division titles and two Southern League championships. Their postseason record has been 12–6 (.667). Conversely, the team's lowest record has been with the Mariners from 2007 to 2016. They compiled a 674–712 (.486) record and reached the postseason on four occasions, winning two division titles and one league championship. Their postseason record was 11–11 (.500).

Table key
League	The team's final position in the league standings
Division	The team's final position in the divisional standings
GB	Games behind the team that finished in first place in the division that season
‡	League champions
†	Division champions
*	Postseason berth

Season-by-season results
Season	Regular season					Postseason			MLB affiliate	Ref.
Season	Record	Win %	League	Division	GB	Record	Win %	Result	MLB affiliate	Ref.
1998	66–74	.471	7th (tie)	4th (tie)	20	—	—	Result	—	Chicago Cubs
1999 † *	84–57	.596	1st	1st	—	4–4	.500	Won First and Second Half Western Division titles Won Western Division title vs. Chattanooga Lookouts, 3–1; Lost SL championship vs. Orlando Rays, 3–1	Chicago Cubs	
2000 ‡ † *	80–58	.580	1st	1st	—	6–4	.600	Won Second Half Western Division title Won Western Division title vs. Birmingham Barons, 3–2; Won SL championship vs. Jacksonville Suns, 3–2	Chicago Cubs	
2001	59–80	.424	9th	5th	20 1/2	—	—	—	Chicago Cubs	
2002 *	73–67	.521	4th	3rd	6	2–3	.400	Won Second Half Western Division title Lost Western Division title vs. Birmingham Barons, 3–2	Chicago Cubs	
2003	65–63	.471	8th (tie)	3rd (tie)	10	—	—	—	Chicago Cubs	
2004	70–68	.507	5th	3rd	2 1/2	—	—	—	Chicago Cubs	
2005 † *	83–56	.597	1st	1st	—	4–3	.571	Won First and Second Half Northern Division titles Won Northern Division title vs. Carolina Mudcats, 3–0; Lost SL championship vs. Jacksonville Suns, 3–1	Chicago Cubs	
2006	75–65	.536	4th	2nd	6	—	—	—	Chicago Cubs	
2007	60–79	.432	9th	4th	16	—	—	—	Seattle Mariners	
2008 *	70–68	.507	5th	3rd	9	0–3	.000	Won First Half Northern Division title Lost Northern Division title vs. Carolina Mudcats, 3–0	Seattle Mariners	
2009	62–78	.443	5th	10th	9	—	—	—	Seattle Mariners	
2010 *	72–66	.525	4th	2nd	13	1–3	.250	Lost Northern Division title vs. Tennessee Smokies, 3–1	Seattle Mariners	
2011	68–72	.486	6th	3rd	15	—	—	—	Seattle Mariners	
2012 † *	79–61	.564	1st	1st	—	4–4	.500	Won First Half Northern Division title Won Northern Division title vs. Chattanooga Lookouts, 3–1; Lost SL championship vs. Mobile BayBears, 3–1	Seattle Mariners	
2013	62–73	.459	7th	3rd	12 1/2	—	—	—	Seattle Mariners	
2014	63–76	.453	7th	3rd	13 1/2	—	—	—	Seattle Mariners	
2015	53–84	.387	10th	5th	23 1/2	—	—	—	Seattle Mariners	
2016 ‡ † *	84–55	.604	1st	1st	—	6–1	.857	Won First Half Northern Division title Won Northern Division title vs. Montgomery Biscuits, 3–1; Won SL championship vs. Mississippi Braves, 3–0	Seattle Mariners	
2017	71–69	.507	5th	3rd	20	—	—	—	Arizona Diamondbacks	
2018 ‡ † *	75–64	.540	3rd	2nd	3 1/2	6–3	.667	Won First Half Northern Division title Won Northern Division title vs. Montgomery Biscuits, 3–2; Won SL championship vs. Biloxi Shuckers, 3–1	Arizona Diamondbacks	
2019 ‡ † *	78–57	.578	3rd	2nd	8 1/2	6–3	.667	Won Northern Division title vs. Montgomery Biscuits, 3–1; Won SL championship vs. Biloxi Shuckers, 3–2	Arizona Diamondbacks	
2020	Season cancelled (COVID-19 pandemic)								Arizona Diamondbacks	
Totals	1,553–1,500	.509	—	—	—	39–31	.557	—	—	—

Franchise totals by affiliation
Affiliation	Regular season		Postseason		
Affiliation	Record	Win %	Appearances	Record	Win %
Chicago Cubs (1998–2006)	655–598	.523	4	16–14	.533
Seattle Mariners (2007–2016)	674–712	.486	4	11–11	.500
Arizona Diamondbacks (2017–2020)	224–190	.541	2	12–6	.667
Totals	1,553–1,500	.509	10	39–31	.557

== Television and radio ==
All Jackson Generals games were shown on MiLB.TV. All games were also broadcast on radio by Radio Willie 94.1 FM and 1390 AM with sportscaster Tyler Springs handling the play-by-play since 2017.

== Awards ==
Six Generals players won Southern League awards in recognition for their performance with Jackson. Three won Most Valuable Player Awards, while three won the Most Outstanding Pitcher Award. Three managers won the Manager of the Year Award. The team also won one Executive of the Year Award. Altogether, the Generals won 10 Southern League awards.

Southern League Award Winners
Award	Recipient	Season	Ref.
Most Valuable Player Award	Richard Lewis	2004	Ref.
Most Valuable Player Award	Tyler O'Neill	2016	
Most Valuable Player Award	Kevin Cron	2017	
Most Outstanding Pitcher Award	Ricky Nolasco	2005	
Most Outstanding Pitcher Award	Brandon Maurer	2012	
Most Outstanding Pitcher Award	Ryan Yarbrough	2016	
Manager of the Year Award	Dave Trembley	1999	
Manager of the Year Award	Dave Bialas	2000	
Manager of the Year Award	Daren Brown	2016	
Executive of the Year Award	David Hersh	1999	
