= Smokies Stadium =

Baseball venue in Kodak, Tennessee

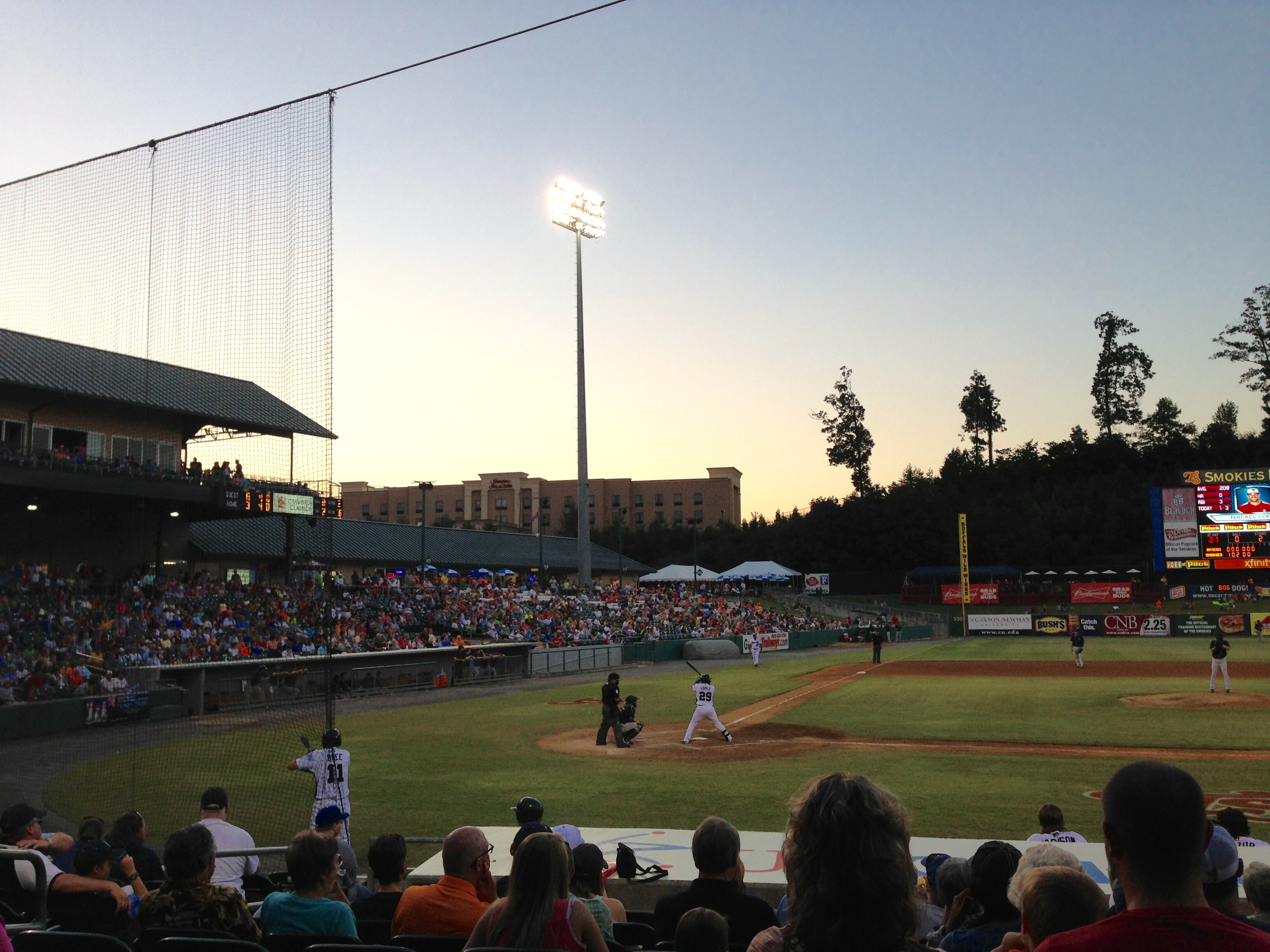
- Interactive map of Smokies Stadium
- Former names: Sevierville/Sevier County Multi-Use Stadium (planning name); Smokies Park
- Location: 3540 Line Drive; Kodak, Tennessee, United States
- Coordinates: 35°59′20″N 83°36′16″W
- Owner: Sevier County and the City of Sevierville
- Operator: SPBC, LLC
- Capacity: 6,412
- Surface: Bermuda Grass
- Record attendance: 8,193 (April 12, 2022; Tennessee Volunteers vs. Tennessee Tech Golden Eagles)
- Field size: Left Field: 330 feet (100 m); Center Field: 400 feet (120 m); Right Field: 320 feet (98 m)

Construction
- Groundbreaking: April 23, 1999
- Opened: April 20, 2000
- Cost: $19.4 million ($36.3 million in 2025 dollars)
- Architects: HNTB; BarberMcMurry
- General contractor: Denark–Smith

Tenant
- Tennessee Smokies (SL) (2000–2024)

Smokies Stadium (formerly known as Smokies Park) is a baseball stadium located in Kodak, Tennessee, inside Sevierville city limits and east of Knoxville, adjacent to the tourist centers of Pigeon Forge and Gatlinburg. The park, which opened in 2000, has a capacity of 6,412. It is the former home of the Tennessee Smokies of the Southern League. Smokies Park was constructed as a replacement facility for the since shuttered Bill Meyer Stadium in Knoxville.

== Features ==
Just like the playing field, the grandstand is symmetrical and it extends well down the outfield lines, where stadium-style seats give way to bleachers with backs. All chair back seats contain cup holders and are painted dark green.

The park has 18 suites located above the seating bowl. Each 300-square-foot suite holds 20 people and has a balcony with a dozen stadium-style seats. Suite dimensions are 20 feet deep by 13 feet wide.

Party porches bookend the suites. Copper Cellar Clubhouse (first base) and Davey Crockett Porch (third base), each porch measures 33 feet deep by 28 feet wide (about 900 square feet) and has stadium seating for 26 people with 11 elevated patio chairs placed directly behind the two rows of regular seats. The porches are open-air but covered by the stadium's roof. Another porch, Calhoun's at the Yard completed in 2014, is located in left field. Pioneer Porch, added in 2015, is a smaller porch in right field suitable for group outings.

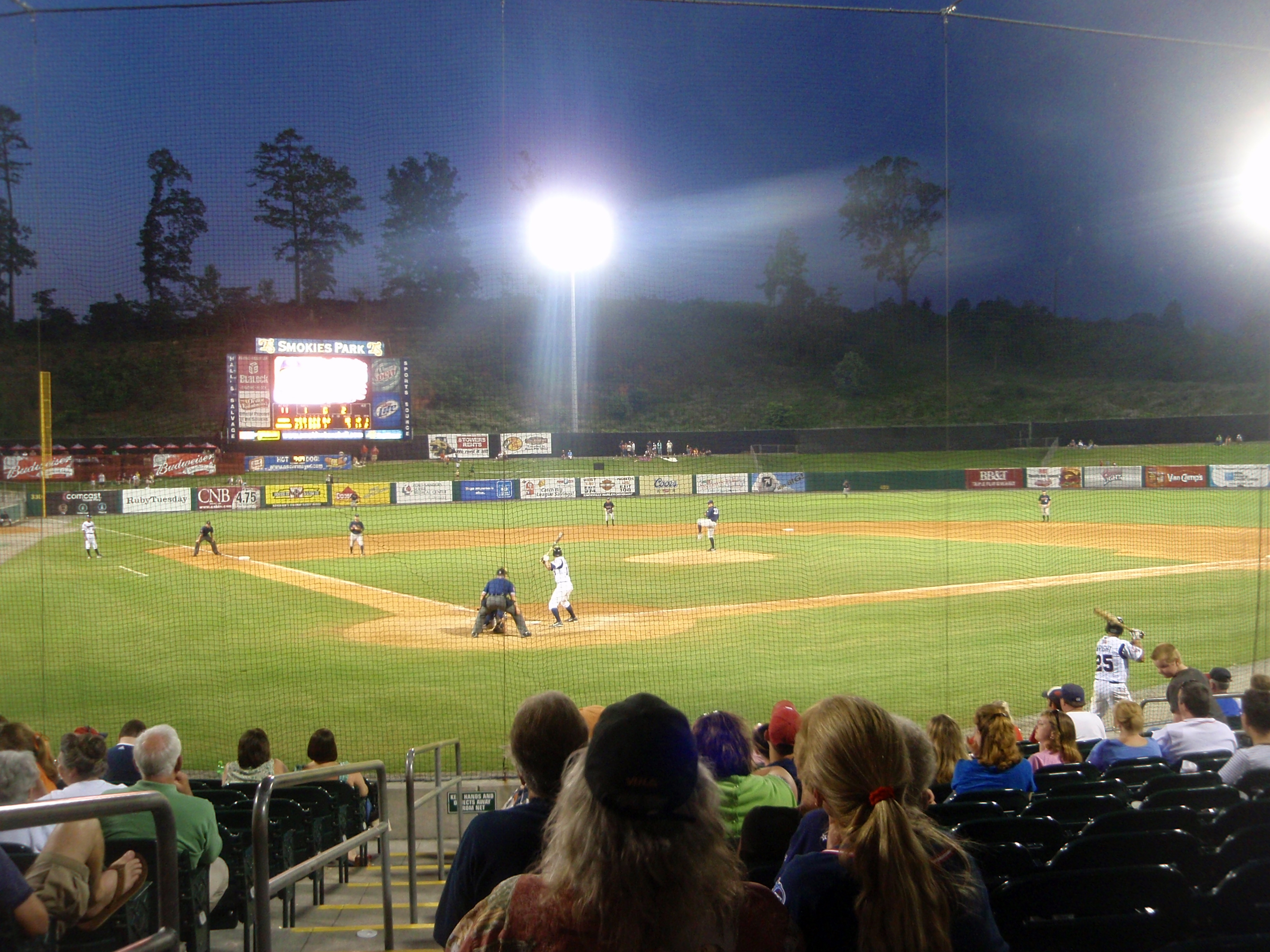
A game at Smokies Park in 2009

The park's scoreboard, stationed behind the left field berm, features a large high-definition video board. The 36-foot wide by 17-foot high HD-X LED video display was installed in 2008 and displays crisp player pictures and real-time stats. Beneath it is a 36-foot by 9-foot board which displays the line score.

In the right field corner of the ballpark is "Homer's Playland", named after the Smokies' newest mascot, Homer the Hound. The area consists of a slide, obstacle course, 2 moon bounces (big and small), a Home Run Challenge, Speed Pitch, and a prize wheel. Parents can purchase a single ticket for one attraction or buy a wristband and get unlimited slide, both moon bounces, and obstacle course until the top of the eighth inning when the Playland closes.

Three flag poles are erected behind the waterfall portion of the nature scene. Depending on the day, a white flag with a blue "W" may fly alongside the prerequisite state and American flags. Since 2007, the Smokies have been a Cubs affiliate and the "win" flag is one of many traditions that make Chicago's "Friendly Confines" the baseball shrine that it is. Just like at Wrigley Field, the Smokies copycat version flaps following victories by the home team.

== Attendance records ==
The ballpark's single-game attendance record was set on April 12, 2022, when 8,183 people watched the Tennessee Volunteers playe Tennessee Tech. Tennessee Tech beat Tennessee 3-2.

The Tennessee Smokies beat the Chattanooga Lookouts 10–7 on April 20, 2000, in front of 7,318 fans in the first game at the ballpark. On May 24, 2008, John Smoltz, then of the Atlanta Braves, made a rehab appearance with their Double-A affiliate Mississippi Braves. News of his appearance drew a crowd of 7,381 to the ballpark as the Smokies won 3–2. Smokies Park experienced a then record breaking crowd of 7,655 on July 3, 2009, against the Huntsville Stars. The Smokies won the intense game, 5–3, which included Hall of Fame manager Ryne Sandberg being ejected. On May 13, 2017, 7,958 people watched the Smokies play the Montgomery Biscuits on Star Wars night.
