= Southern League Pitcher of the Year Award =

- Sport: Baseball
- League: Southern League
- Awarded for: Best regular-season pitcher in the Southern League
- Country: United States
- Presented by: Southern League

History
- First award: Bill Campbell (1972)
- Most recent: Eliazar Dishmey (2026)

The Southern League Pitcher of the Year Award is an annual award given to the best pitcher in Minor League Baseball's Southern League based on their regular-season performance as voted on by league managers. League broadcasters, Minor League Baseball executives, and members of the media have previously voted as well. Though the league was established in 1964, the Most Outstanding Pitcher Award, as it was originally known, was not created until 1972. After the cancellation of the 2020 season, the league was known as the Double-A South in 2021 before reverting to the Southern League name in 2022. The award became known as the Pitcher of the Year Award in 2021.

Eight players from the Jacksonville Suns have been selected for the Pitcher of the Year Award, more than any other team in the league, followed by the Birmingham Barons (6); the Nashville Sounds (5); the Biloxi Shuckers (4); the Charlotte Knights, Columbus Astros, Greenville Braves, Knoxville Smokies, Orlando Twins, and Jackson Generals (3); the Chattanooga Lookouts, Mobile BayBears, Montgomery Biscuits, and Pensacola Blue Wahoos (2); and the Carolina Mudcats, Charlotte Hornets, Huntsville Stars, Mississippi Braves, Nashville Xpress, and Rocket City Trash Pandas (1).

Five players from the Chicago White Sox, Cincinnati Reds, Milwaukee Brewers, and Minnesota Twins Major League Baseball (MLB) organizations have each won the award, more than any others, followed by the Atlanta Braves and Miami Marlins organizations (4); the Houston Astros, New York Yankees, Seattle Mariners, and Toronto Blue Jays organizations (3); the Baltimore Orioles, Chicago Cubs, Detroit Tigers, Los Angeles Dodgers, Tampa Bay Rays, and Washington Nationals organizations (2); and the Arizona Diamondbacks, Los Angeles Angels, San Diego Padres organizations (1).

== Winners ==
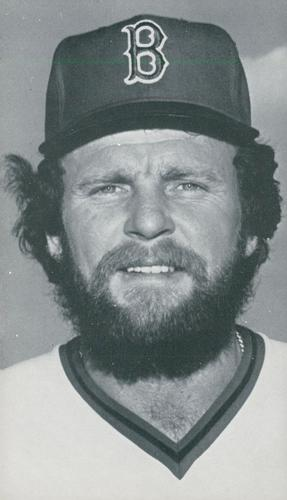
Bill Campbell won the first Most Outstanding Pitcher Award in 1972 and won two American League Rolaids Relief Man Awards.

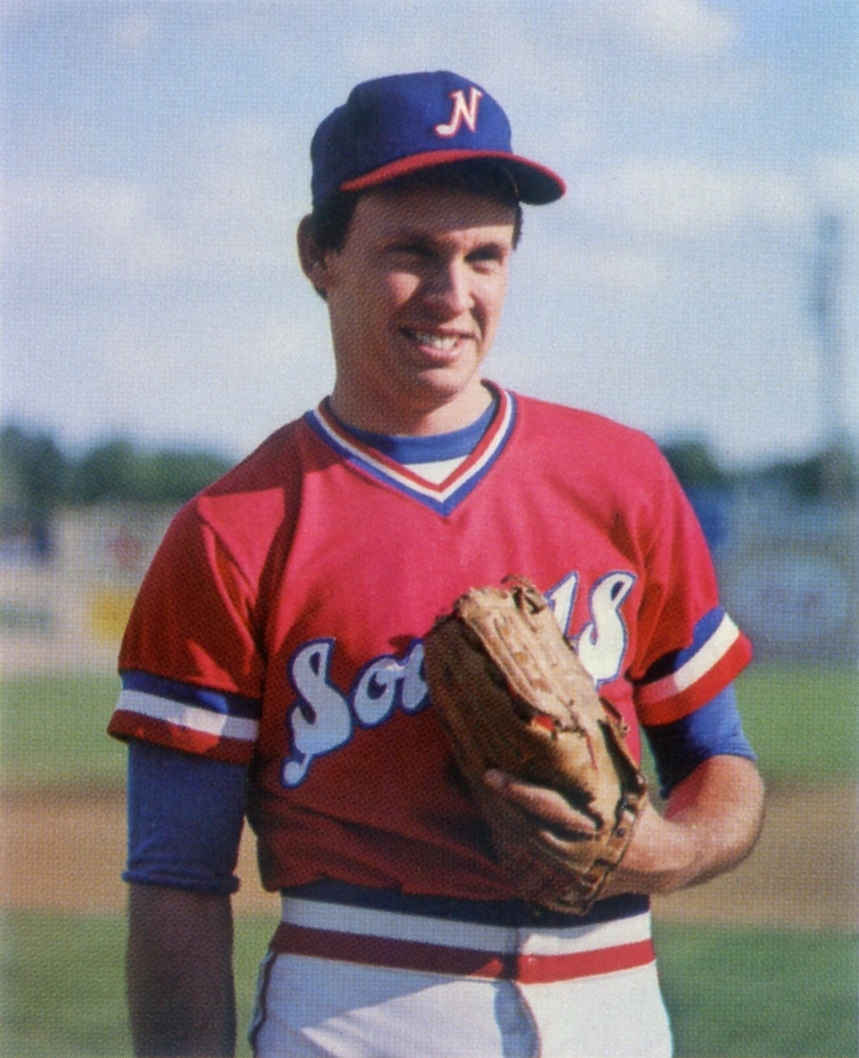
Geoff Combe, the 1979 winner, was one of five Nashville Sounds pitchers to win the award over a five-year period (1978–1982).

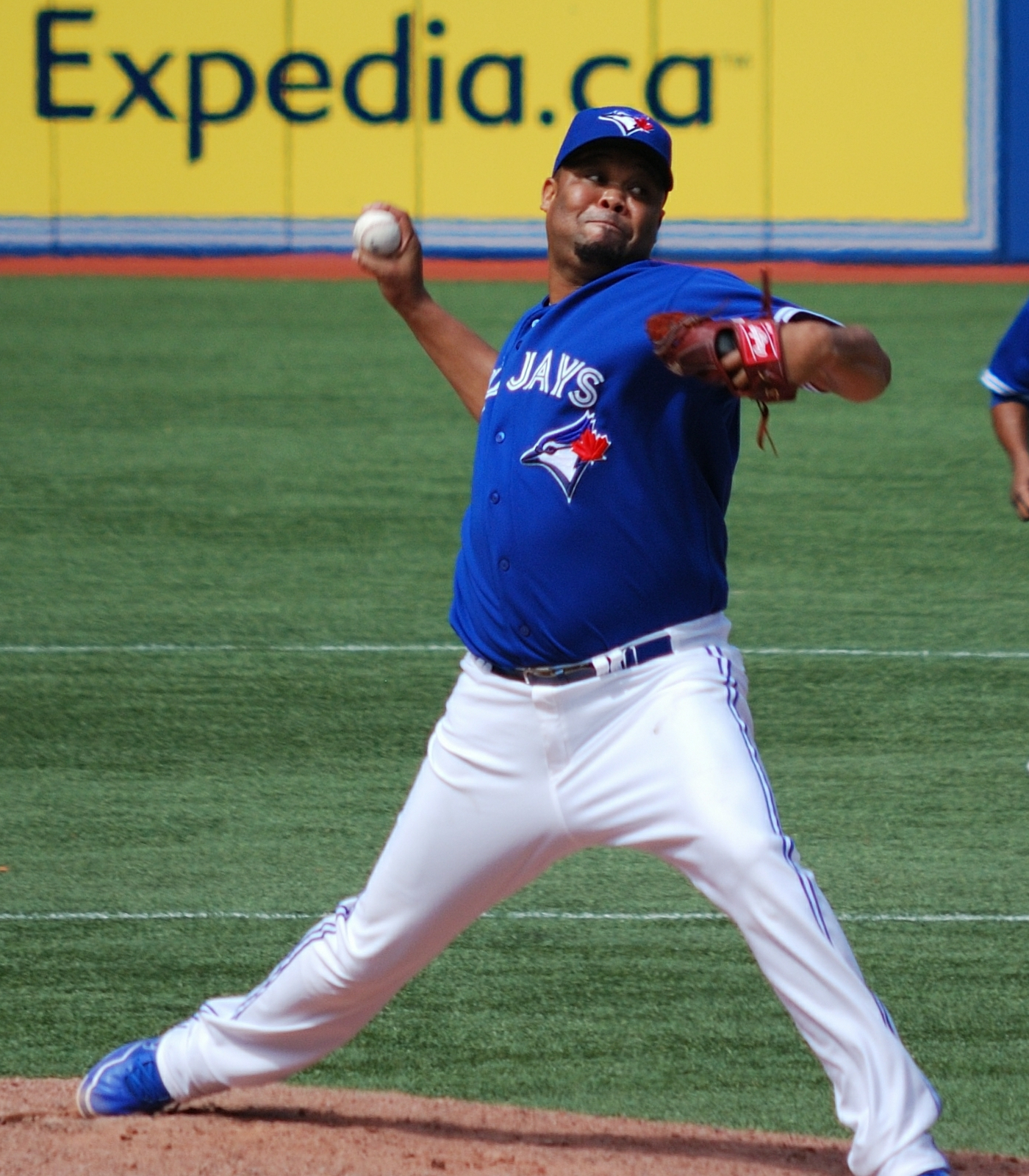
Francisco Cordero, who won in 1999, was selected to play in three MLB All-Star Games.

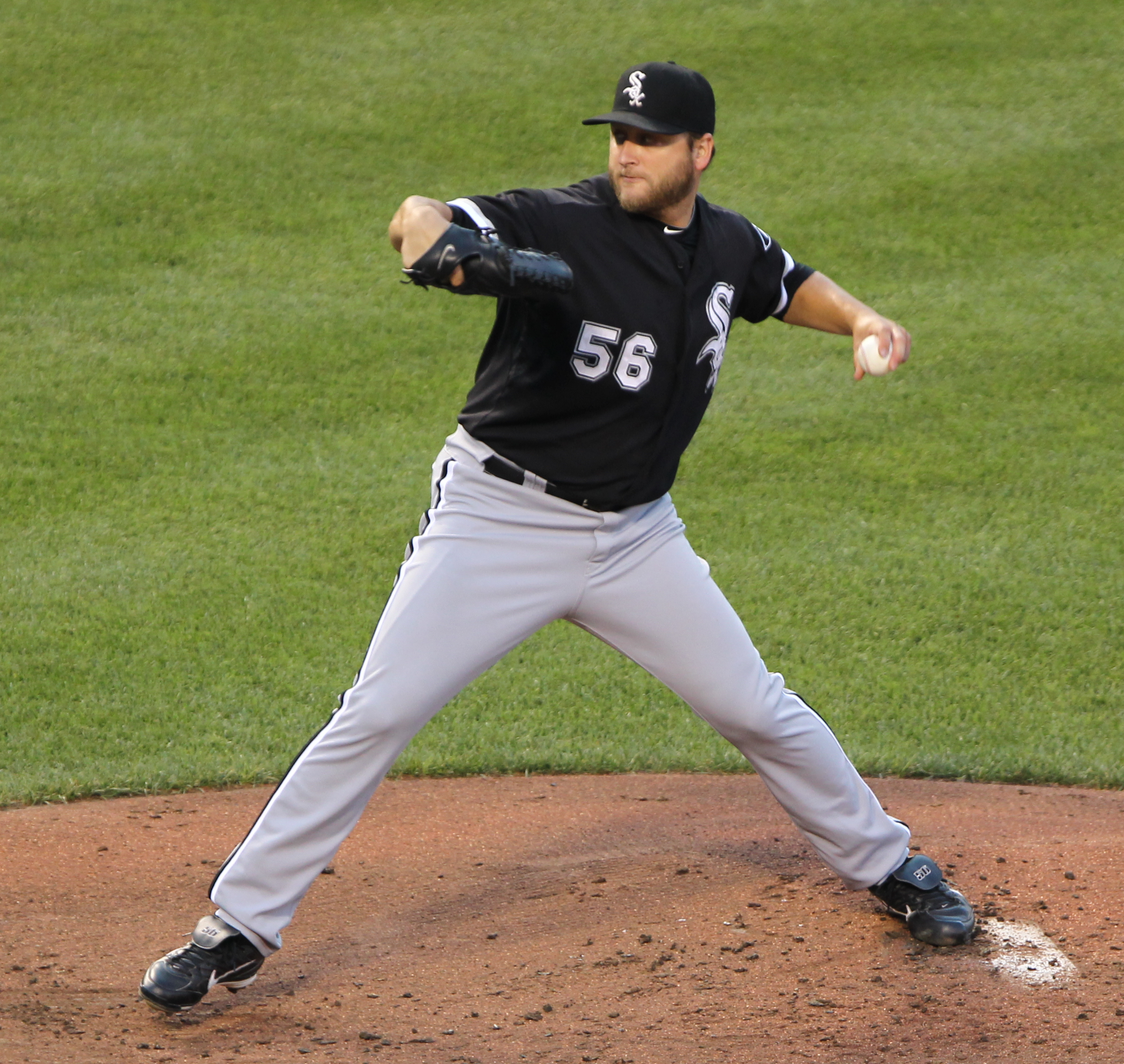
Mark Buehrle, the 2000 winner, became a five-time MLB All-Star and pitched a perfect game.

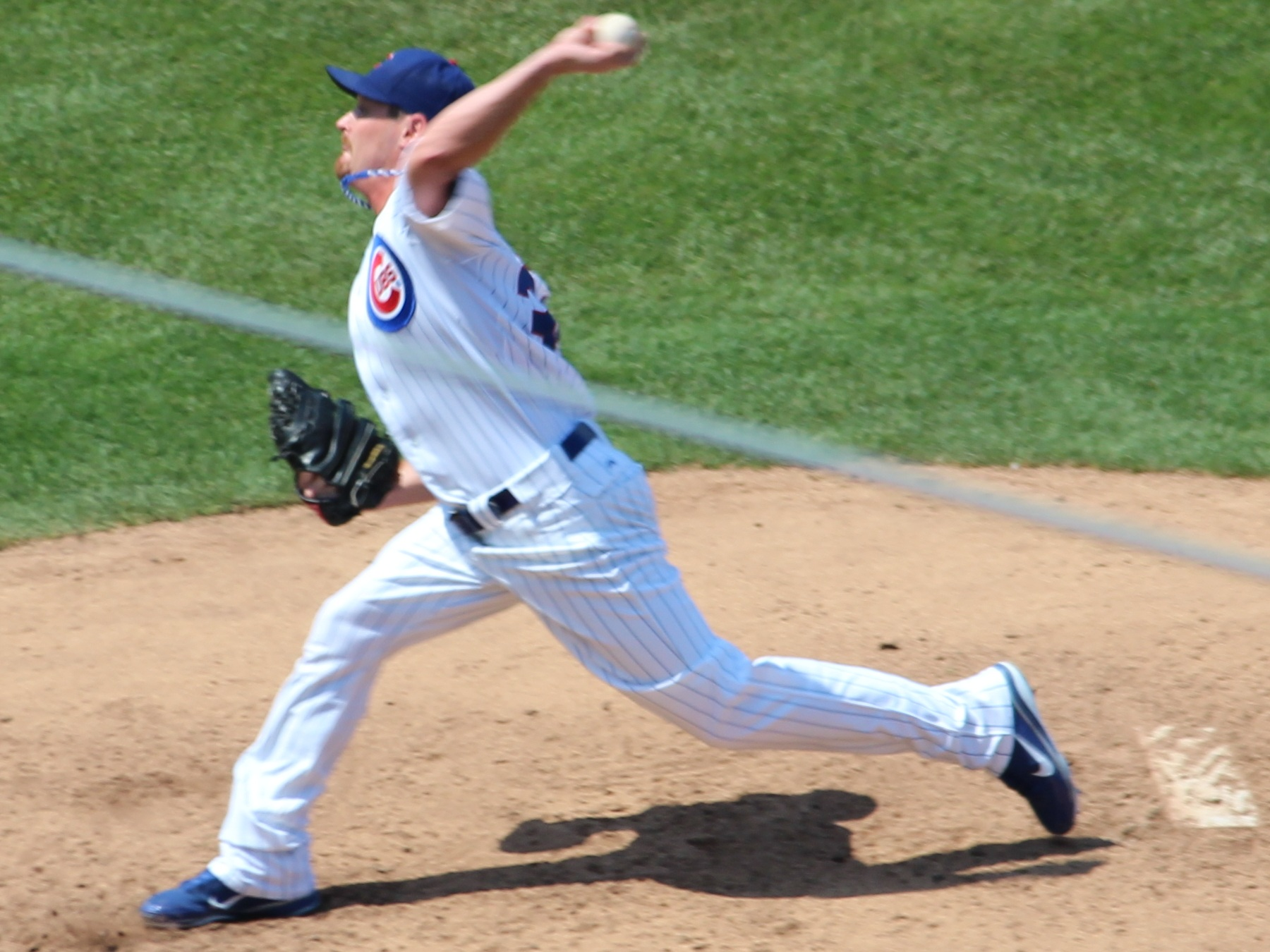
Travis Wood, winner in 2009, is one of five pitchers in the Cincinnati Reds system to win the Most Outstanding Pitcher Award.

Key
Record	The pitcher's win–loss record during the regular season
Saves	The number of saves earned by the pitcher, if any, during the regular season
ERA	The pitcher's earned run average (ERA) during the regular season
SO	The number of strikeouts recorded by the pitcher during the regular season
^	Indicates multiple award winners in the same year

Winners
Year	Winner	Team	Organization	Record	Saves	ERA	SO	Ref(s).
1972	Bill Campbell	Charlotte Hornets	Minnesota Twins	13–10	0	2.42	204	
1973	Doug Konieczny	Columbus Astros	Houston Astros	12–12	0	2.66	222	
1974	Paul Siebert	Columbus Astros	Houston Astros	15–7	0	2.56	120	
1975	Bob Maneely	Orlando Twins	Minnesota Twins	14–8	0	2.78	91	
1976	Dave Ford	Charlotte O's	Baltimore Orioles	17–7	0	2.50	121	
1977	Greg Field	Orlando Twins	Minnesota Twins	14–7	0	2.78	103	
1978	Bruce Berenyi	Nashville Sounds	Cincinnati Reds	10–5	0	2.47	103	
1979	Geoff Combe	Nashville Sounds	Cincinnati Reds	5–5	27	2.07	84	
1980	Andy McGaffigan	Nashville Sounds	New York Yankees	15–5	0	2.38	125	
1981	Jamie Werly	Nashville Sounds	New York Yankees	13–11	0	2.59	193	
1982	Stefan Wever	Nashville Sounds	New York Yankees	16–6	0	2.78	191	
1983	Don Heinkel	Birmingham Barons	Detroit Tigers	19–6	0	3.39	113	
1984	Ken Dixon	Charlotte O's	Baltimore Orioles	16–8	1	2.85	211	
1985	Steve Davis	Knoxville Blue Jays	Toronto Blue Jays	17–6	1	2.45	107	
1986	Anthony Kelley	Columbus Astros	Houston Astros	14–4	0	3.63	126	
1987	Brian Holman	Jacksonville Expos	Montreal Expos	14–5	0	2.50	115	
1988	Germán González	Orlando Twins	Minnesota Twins	2–1	31	1.02	69	
1989	Laddie Renfroe	Charlotte Knights	Chicago Cubs	19–7	15	3.14	85	
1990	Brian Barnes	Jacksonville Expos	Montreal Expos	13–7	0	2.77	213	
1991	Mark Wohlers	Greenville Braves	Atlanta Braves	0–0	21	0.57	44	
1992^	Jim Converse	Jacksonville Suns	Seattle Mariners	12–7	0	2.66	157	
1992^	Jerry Spradlin	Chattanooga Lookouts	Cincinnati Reds	3–3	34	1.38	35	
1993	Oscar Múñoz	Nashville Xpress	Minnesota Twins	11–4	0	3.08	139	
1994	Brad Clontz	Greenville Braves	Atlanta Braves	1–2	27	1.20	49	
1995	Luis Andújar	Birmingham Barons	Chicago White Sox	14–8	0	2.85	146	
1996	Curt Lyons	Chattanooga Lookouts	Cincinnati Reds	13–4	0	2.41	176	
1997	Scott Eyre	Birmingham Barons	Chicago White Sox	13–5	0	3.84	127	
1998	Bruce Chen	Greenville Braves	Atlanta Braves	13–7	0	3.29	164	
1999	Francisco Cordero	Jacksonville Suns	Detroit Tigers	4–1	27	1.38	58	
2000	Mark Buehrle	Birmingham Barons	Chicago White Sox	8–4	0	2.28	68	
2001	Chris Baker	Tennessee Smokies	Toronto Blue Jays	15–6	1	3.37	121	
2002	Vinnie Chulk	Tennessee Smokies	Toronto Blue Jays	13–5	1	2.96	108	
2003	Joel Hanrahan	Jacksonville Suns	Los Angeles Dodgers	10–4	0	2.43	130	
2004	Brad Baker	Mobile BayBears	San Diego Padres	2–1	30	1.57	68	
2005	Ricky Nolasco	West Tenn Diamond Jaxx	Chicago Cubs	14–3	0	2.89	173	
2006	Spike Lundberg	Jacksonville Suns	Los Angeles Dodgers	15–2	0	2.27	110	
2007	Chris Mason	Montgomery Biscuits	Tampa Bay Devil Rays	15–4	0	2.57	136	
2008	Todd Redmond	Mississippi Braves	Atlanta Braves	13–5	0	3.52	133	
2009	Travis Wood	Carolina Mudcats	Cincinnati Reds	9–3	0	1.21	103	
2010	Tom Koehler	Jacksonville Suns	Florida Marlins	16–2	0	2.61	145	
2011	Wily Peralta	Huntsville Stars	Milwaukee Brewers	9–7	0	3.46	117	
2012	Brandon Maurer	Jackson Generals	Seattle Mariners	9–2	0	3.20	117	
2013	Archie Bradley	Mobile BayBears	Arizona Diamondbacks	12–5	0	1.97	119	
2014	Justin Nicolino	Jacksonville Suns	Miami Marlins	14–4	0	2.85	81	
2015	Jorge López	Biloxi Shuckers	Milwaukee Brewers	12–5	0	2.26	137	
2016	Ryan Yarbrough	Jackson Generals	Seattle Mariners	12–4	0	2.95	99	
2017	Michael Kopech	Birmingham Barons	Chicago White Sox	8–7	0	2.87	155	
2018	Zack Brown	Biloxi Shuckers	Milwaukee Brewers	9–1	0	2.44	116	
2019	Trey Supak	Biloxi Shuckers	Milwaukee Brewers	11–4	0	2.20	91	
2020	None selected (season cancelled due to COVID-19 pandemic)							
2021	Max Meyer	Pensacola Blue Wahoos	Miami Marlins	6–3	0	2.41	113	
2022	Chase Silseth	Rocket City Trash Pandas	Los Angeles Angels	7–0	0	2.28	110	
2023	Carlos Rodríguez	Biloxi Shuckers	Milwaukee Brewers	9–6	0	2.77	152	
2024	Noah Schultz	Birmingham Barons	Chicago White Sox	0–3	0	1.48	73	
2025	Ty Johnson	Montgomery Biscuits	Tampa Bay Rays	7–6	0	2.61	149	
2026	Eliazar Dishmey	Pensacola Blue Wahoos	Miami Marlins	4–1	0	3.30	92	

== Wins by team ==
Active Southern League teams appear in bold.

Team	Award(s)	Year(s)
Jacksonville Suns (Jacksonville Expos)	8	1987, 1990, 1992, 1999, 2003, 2006, 2010, 2014
**Birmingham Barons**	6	1983, 1995, 1997, 2000, 2017, 2024
Nashville Sounds	5	1978, 1979, 1980, 1981, 1982
**Biloxi Shuckers**	4	2015, 2018, 2019, 2023
Charlotte Knights (Charlotte O's)	3	1976, 1984, 1989
Columbus Astros	3	1973, 1974, 1986
Greenville Braves	3	1991, 1994, 1998
**Knoxville Smokies** (Knoxville Blue Jays/Tennessee Smokies)	3	1985, 2001, 2002
Orlando Twins	3	1975, 1977, 1988
Jackson Generals (West Tenn Diamond Jaxx)	3	2005, 2012, 2016
**Chattanooga Lookouts**	2	1992, 1996
Mobile BayBears	2	2004, 2013
**Montgomery Biscuits**	2	2007, 2025
**Pensacola Blue Wahoos**	2	2021, 2026
Carolina Mudcats	1	2009
Charlotte Hornets	1	1972
Huntsville Stars	1	2011
Mississippi Braves	1	2008
Nashville Xpress	1	1993
**Rocket City Trash Pandas**	1	2022

== Wins by organization ==
Active Southern League–Major League Baseball affiliations appear in bold.

Organization	Award(s)	Year(s)
**Chicago White Sox**	5	1995, 1997, 2000, 2017, 2024
**Cincinnati Reds**	5	1978, 1979, 1992, 1996, 2009
**Milwaukee Brewers**	5	2011, 2015, 2018, 2019, 2023
Minnesota Twins	5	1972, 1975, 1977, 1988, 1993
**Atlanta Braves**	4	1991, 1994, 1998, 2008
**Miami Marlins** (Florida Marlins)	4	2010, 2014, 2021, 2026
Houston Astros	3	1973, 1974, 1986
New York Yankees	3	1980, 1981, 1982
Seattle Mariners	3	1992, 2012, 2016
Toronto Blue Jays	3	1985, 2001, 2002
Baltimore Orioles	2	1976, 1984
**Chicago Cubs**	2	1989, 2005
Detroit Tigers	2	1983, 1999
Los Angeles Dodgers	2	2003, 2006
**Tampa Bay Rays** (Tampa Bay Devil Rays)	2	2007, 2025
Washington Nationals (Montreal Expos)	2	1987, 1990
Arizona Diamondbacks	1	2013
**Los Angeles Angels**	1	2022
San Diego Padres	1	2004
