= Hank Aaron Stadium =

Baseball park in Mobile, Alabama

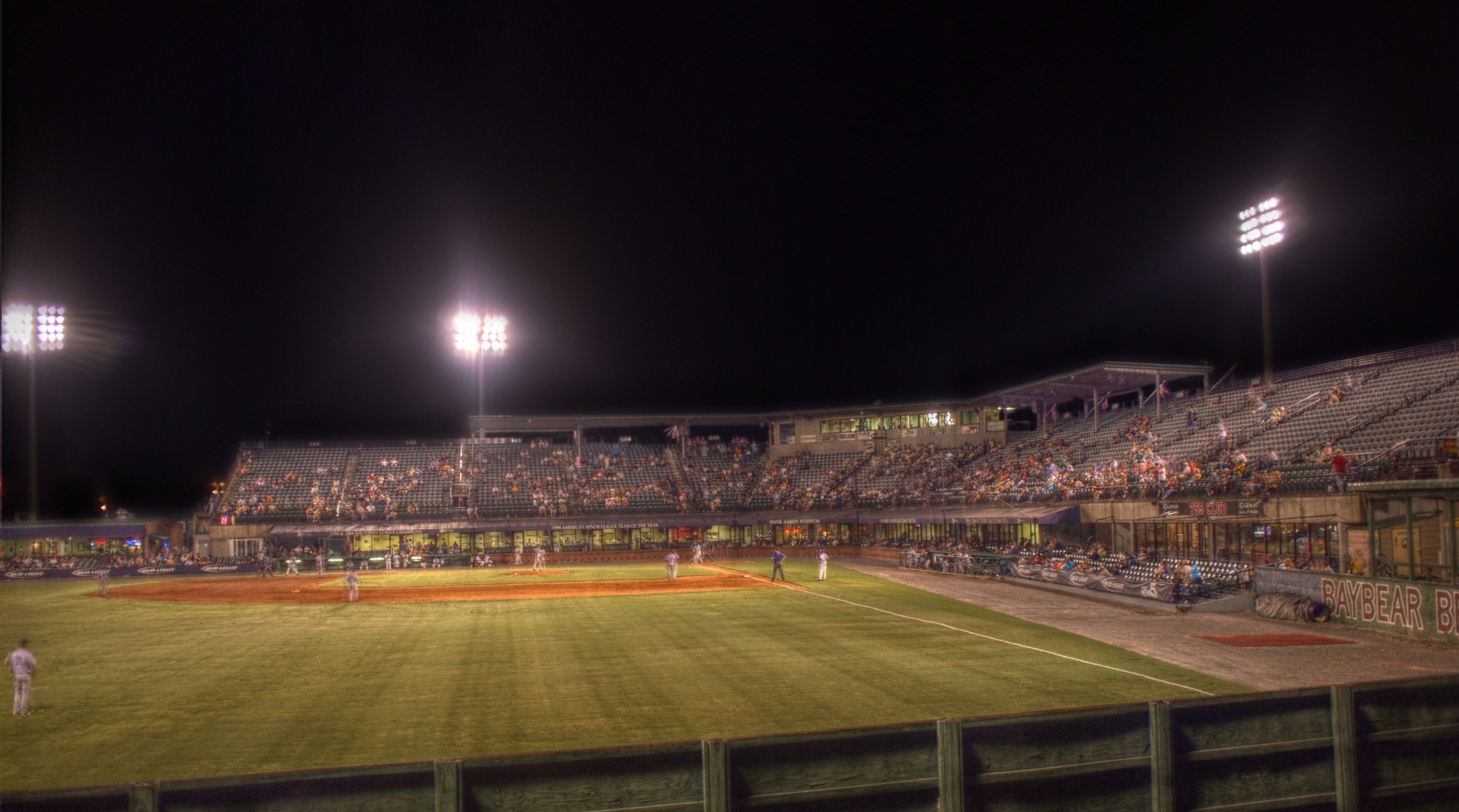
- Hank Aaron Stadium from the outfield in 2009
- Interactive map of Hank Aaron Stadium
- Location: 755 Bolling Brothers Boulevard; Mobile, AL 36606
- Coordinates: 30.64574°N 88.11687°W
- Owner: City of Mobile
- Operator: Unknown
- Capacity: 6,000
- Surface: Grass
- Field size: Left Field: 325 ft (99 m); Left-Center: 396 ft (121 m); Center Field: 400 ft (120 m); Right-center: 387 ft (118 m); Right Field: 310 ft (94 m)

Construction
- Groundbreaking: December 12, 1996
- Opened: April 17, 1997
- Closed: March 27, 2021
- Cost: $8 million ($16 million in 2025 dollars)
- Architect: Brisbin Brook Beynon Architects
- Project managers: National Sports Services, Inc.
- Services engineer: Volkert and Associates, Inc.
- General contractors: White-Spunner Construction, Inc.

Tenant
- Mobile BayBears (SL) 1997–2019

Hank Aaron Stadium is a baseball park in Mobile, Alabama. From 1997 to 2019, it hosted the Mobile BayBears, a minor-league professional team in the Southern League. The stadium opened in 1997 and has a capacity of 6,000. The ballpark was named after Major League Baseball's home run king (1974–2007) and Mobile native Hank Aaron. It also features a commemorative plaque outside the stadium to honor each Mobilian enshrined at the Hall of Fame in Cooperstown, New York. Hank Aaron Stadium is unique in that the luxury suites are at field level. Thus, infield seating for the general public is elevated from the field by approximately 20 feet.

The BayBears played their final game on September 2, 2019, before a relocation to Madison, Alabama, in 2020. Mobile Sports and Entertainment Group (MSEG) was tabbed as operator of the stadium on December 11, 2019. In 2022, the property owner took back control of the land and has permanently closed the stadium. In 2023, the childhood home of Hank Aaron, which was a museum on the stadium property, was moved to another site in Mobile.

== History ==
In November 1995, Mobile's city council voted to allocate $4 million to a new ballpark in Mobile and name it Hank Aaron Stadium. The city committed to pay for half the cost of construction and match the contribution of new franchise owner Eric Margenau. Architectural plans for the ballpark were unveiled in May 1996. Mobile city council member Vivian Davis Figures had suggested that the new ballpark be named after Aaron. The ballpark opened on April 17, 1997. Aaron's number 44 was retired by the BayBears and he threw out the first pitch with his parents, siblings, and extended family in attendance.

On July 14, 1999, the ballpark hosted the Double-A All-Star Game in which a team of National League-affiliated All-Stars defeated a team of American League-affiliated All-Stars, 3–0, before 6,174 people in attendance.

In the stadium's final BayBears game, Mobile was defeated by the Tennessee Smokies, 5–4, before a crowd of 1,554 people.

On March 26 and 27, 2021, the Savannah Bananas played the Savannah Party Animals. This was the final sporting event at Hank Aaron Stadium, as the owners seized control of the stadium in 2022.

== See also ==
- List of people from Mobile, Alabama
