= Mobile BayBears =

- 1997–2019; Mobile, Alabama

Team logo	Cap insignia

Minor league affiliations
- Class: Double-A (1997–2019)
- League: Southern League (1997–2019)

Major league affiliations
- Team: Los Angeles Angels (2017–2019); Arizona Diamondbacks (2007–2016); San Diego Padres (1997–2006)

Minor league titles
- League titles (4): 1998; 2004*; 2011; 2012
- Division titles (3): 1998; 2004; 2011; *Co-champions

Team data
- Colors: Navy, light blue, ecru, white
- Mascot: Teddy (2001–2019); Bay B. Bear (1997–2019); BayBear (1997–2004); Kookie (2001–2019)
- Ballpark: Hank Aaron Stadium (1997–2019)

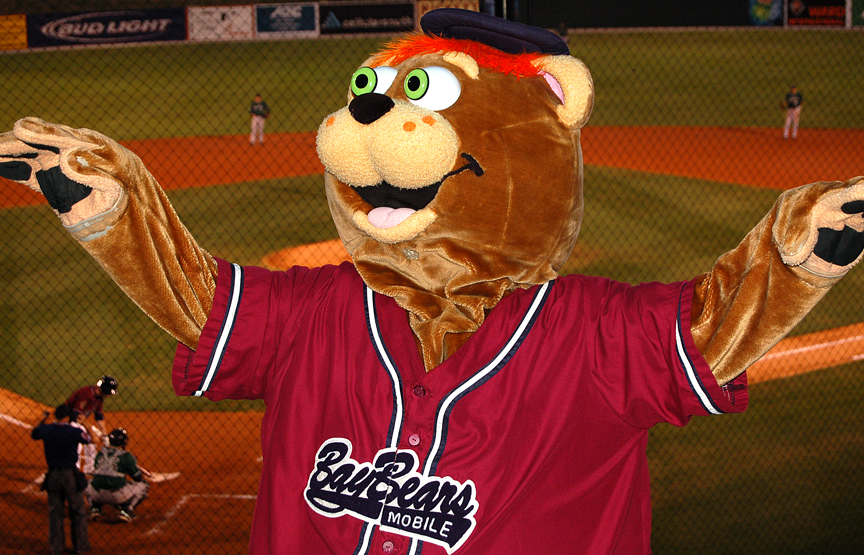
"Teddy", mascot of the BayBears

The Mobile BayBears were a Minor League Baseball team based in Mobile, Alabama, United States. The team, which played in the Southern League, served as the Double-A affiliate of the San Diego Padres (1997–2006), Arizona Diamondbacks (2007–2016), and Los Angeles Angels (2017–2019). The BayBears played in Hank Aaron Stadium, which opened in 1997 and is named after baseball's former all-time home run record holder and Mobile native Hank Aaron.

In 2020, the BayBears relocated to Madison, Alabama, where they are now called the Rocket City Trash Pandas.

== History ==
The BayBears franchise originated in 1976 in Charlotte, North Carolina, first as the Charlotte Orioles and then as the first incarnation of the Charlotte Knights. When Charlotte moved up to become a Triple-A franchise in 1993, the team found a temporary home in Nashville, Tennessee, as the Nashville Xpress from 1993 to 1994. It existed as the Port City Roosters in Wilmington, North Carolina, from 1995 to 1996. The franchise landed in Mobile in 1997.

The team's name was announced in July 1996, having been selected in a name-the-team contest. Mobile mayor Mike Dow announced the name at that year's Mobile Fourth of July fireworks display. In September 1996, the BayBears signed an affiliation agreement with the San Diego Padres.

In November 2017, BayBears owners Michael Savit and HWS Group, closed on the sale of the team to BallCorps LLC. The team continued to play in Mobile through the 2019 season, but relocated to Madison, Alabama, in 2020, where they were planned to play in a newly-built ballpark. Upon relocation, the team was renamed the Rocket City Trash Pandas. The name is a reference to both the area's association with the space industry and the determination and ingenuity of raccoons.

The BayBears played their final game on September 2, 2019. They were defeated by the Tennessee Smokies, 5–4, before a crowd of 1,554 people.

== BayBears Hall of Fame ==
- Dusty Allen
- Ben Davis
- Buddy Carlyle
- Matt Clement
- Kevin Nicholson
- Brian Tollberg
- Wiki González
- Jake Peavy

== Other notable alumni ==
- Emilio Bonifacio
- Craig Breslow
- Max Scherzer
- Justin Upton
- Paul Goldschmidt
- Mark Reynolds
- Trevor Bauer
- Tyler Skaggs
