= List of Memphis Chicks (Southern League) seasons =

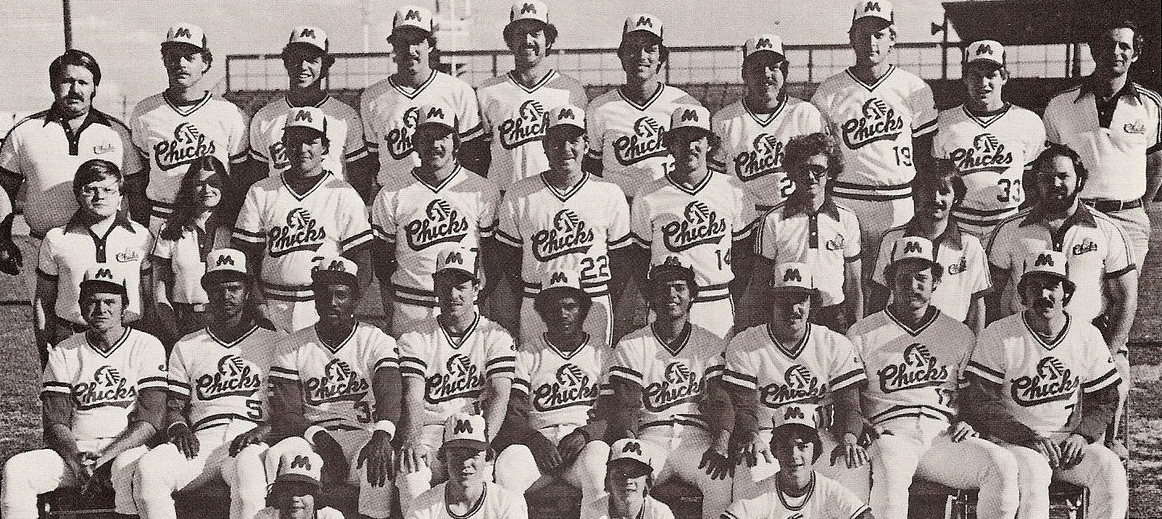
The 1979 Chicks finished with an 82–62 (.569) record playing as the Double-A affiliate of the Montreal Expos in the Southern League.

The Memphis Chicks were a Minor League Baseball team based in Memphis, Tennessee, that played in the Southern League (SL), at the Double-A level, from 1978 to 1997. Memphis was affiliated with Major League Baseball's Montreal Expos (1978–1983), Kansas City Royals (1984–1994), San Diego Padres (1995–1996), and Seattle Mariners (1997). The club played 2,858 regular-season games and compiled a win–loss record of 1,418–1,439 (.496). They appeared in the postseason on seven occasions in which they had a record of 15–21 (.417) in 36 games. Combining all 2,894 regular-season and postseason games, Memphis had an all-time record of 1,433–1,460 (.495).

Created as an expansion team of the Double-A Southern League in 1978, the Chicks played in this league through their final 1997 season. With the arrival of the Memphis Redbirds, a Triple-A expansion team of the Pacific Coast League, the Southern League Chicks franchise relocated to Jackson, Tennessee, after the season to become the West Tenn Diamond Jaxx.

The Chicks' best regular-season record occurred in 1996 when they finished 81–58 (.583). Their lowest season record was 59–84 (.413), which they recorded in 1989. Of the four Major League Baseball teams with which Memphis was affiliated, they experienced their best record as the Double-A farm club of the Padres from 1995 to 1996. In the two-year affiliation, the Chicks compiled a win–loss record of 149–132 (.530). They reached the postseason in both years, going 3–6 (.333), but failed to win a Southern League championship during that stretch. Conversely, Memphis incurred a 67–72 (.482) record over a single season with the Mariners in 1997 and did not reach the postseason. Over their complete 20-year run, the Chicks won two division titles (1980 and 1990) and one Southern League championship (1990).

== Season-by-season records ==
Key
League	The team's final position in the league standings
Division	The team's final position in the divisional standings
GB	Games behind the team that finished in first place in the division that season
‡	League champions
†	Division champions
*	Postseason berth

Season-by-season results
Season	Regular-season					Postseason			MLB affiliate	Ref.
Season	Record	Win %	League	Division	GB	Record	Win %	Result	MLB affiliate	Ref.
1978	71–73	.493	5th	2nd	17	—	—	—	Montreal Expos	
1979 *	82–62	.569	4th	2nd	1	1–2	.333	Won First-Half Western Division title (Note: The Chicks finished the 1979 first half tied for first place with the Montgomery Rebels. The Chicks defeated the Rebels in a one-game playoff, 2–1, to win the first-half title.); Lost Western Division title vs. Nashville Sounds, 2–1	Montreal Expos	
1980 * †	83–61	.576	2nd	2nd	14 1/2	4–4	.500	Won First-Half Western Division title Won Western Division title vs. Nashville Sounds, 3–1; Lost SL championship vs. Charlotte O's, 3–1	Montreal Expos	
1981 *	77–66	.538	3rd	2nd	4	0–3	.000	Won First-Half Western Division title Lost Western Division title vs. Nashville Sounds, 3–0	Montreal Expos	
1982	70–74	.486	6th (tie)	3rd (tie)	7	—	—	—	Montreal Expos	
1983	61–85	.418	10th	5th	30 1/2	—	—	—	Montreal Expos	
1984	71–75	.486	7th	2nd	2 1/2	—	—	—	Kansas City Royals	
1985	65–79	.451	9th	4th	14 1/2	—	—	—	Kansas City Royals	
1986	69–75	.479	9th	4th	10 1/2	—	—	—	Kansas City Royals	
1987	72–71	.503	4th	2nd	1 1/2	—	—	—	Kansas City Royals	
1988 *	79–64	.552	3rd	2nd	2	1–3	.250	Won Second-Half Western Division title Lost Western Division title vs. Chattanooga Lookouts, 3–1	Kansas City Royals	
1989	59–84	.413	10th	5th	29	—	—	—	Kansas City Royals	
1990 * † ‡	73–71	.507	5th	3rd	6	6–3	.667	Won First-Half Western Division title Won Western Division title vs. Birmingham Barons, 3–1; Won SL championship vs. Orlando SunRays, 3–2	Kansas City Royals	
1991	61–83	.424	9th (tie)	4th (tie)	16 1/2	—	—	—	Kansas City Royals	
1992	71–73	.493	4th	3rd	19 1/2	—	—	—	Kansas City Royals	
1993	63–77	.450	9th	5th	14	—	—	—	Kansas City Royals	
1994	75–62	.547	2nd	2nd	5 1/2	—	—	—	Kansas City Royals	
1995 *	68–74	.479	7th	4th	14 1/2	2–3	.400	Won First-Half Western Division title Lost Western Division title vs. Chattanooga Lookouts, 3–2	San Diego Padres	
1996 *	81–58	.583	1st	1st	—	1–3	.250	Won First-Half Western Division title Lost Western Division title vs. Chattanooga Lookouts, 3–1	San Diego Padres	
1997	67–72	.482	7th	5th	10	—	—	—	Seattle Mariners	
Totals	1,419–1,439	.497	—	—	—	15–21	.417	—	—	—

== Franchise totals ==
=== By affiliation ===
Franchise totals by affiliation
Affiliation	Regular-season		Postseason		
Affiliation	Record	Win %	Appearances	Record	Win %
Montreal Expos (1978–1983)	444–421	.513	3	5–9	.357
Kansas City Royals (1984–1994)	758–814	.482	2	7–6	.538
San Diego Padres (1995–1996)	149–132	.530	2	3–6	.333
Seattle Mariners (1997)	67–72	.482	—	—	—
Totals	1,418–1,439	.496	7	15–21	.417
