= 1991 Southern League season =

- League: Southern League
- Sport: Baseball
- Duration: April 11 – September 4
- Number of games: 144
- Number of teams: 10

Regular season
- League champions: Greenville Braves
- Season MVP: Ryan Klesko, Greenville Braves

Playoffs
- League champions: Orlando Sun Rays
- Runners-up: Birmingham Barons

SL seasons
- ← 1990 1992 →

The 1991 Southern League was a Class AA baseball season played between April 11 and September 4. Ten teams played a 144-game schedule, with the top team in each division in each half of the season qualifying for the post-season.

The Orlando Sun Rays won the Southern League championship, as they defeated the Birmingham Barons in the playoffs.

== Team changes ==
- The Columbus Mudcats relocated to Zebulon, North Carolina and are renamed to the Carolina Mudcats. The club ended their affiliation with the Houston Astros and began a new affiliation with the Pittsburgh Pirates.
- The Jacksonville Expos ended their affiliation with the Montreal Expos and began a new affiliation with the Seattle Mariners. The club was renamed to the Jacksonville Suns.

== Teams ==
1991 Southern League
Division	Team	City	MLB Affiliate	Stadium
East	Carolina Mudcats	Wilson, North Carolina; Zebulon, North Carolina	Pittsburgh Pirates	Fleming Stadium; Five County Stadium
East	Charlotte Knights	Charlotte, North Carolina	Chicago Cubs	Knights Stadium
East	Greenville Braves	Greenville, South Carolina	Atlanta Braves	Greenville Municipal Stadium
East	Jacksonville Suns	Jacksonville, Florida	Seattle Mariners	Wolfson Park
East	Orlando Sun Rays	Orlando, Florida	Minnesota Twins	Tinker Field
West	Birmingham Barons	Birmingham, Alabama	Chicago White Sox	Hoover Metropolitan Stadium
West	Chattanooga Lookouts	Chattanooga, Tennessee	Cincinnati Reds	Engel Stadium
West	Huntsville Stars	Huntsville, Alabama	Oakland Athletics	Joe W. Davis Stadium
West	Knoxville Blue Jays	Knoxville, Tennessee	Toronto Blue Jays	Bill Meyer Stadium
West	Memphis Chicks	Memphis, Tennessee	Kansas City Royals	Tim McCarver Stadium

== Map of teams ==
East Division West Division

== Regular season ==
=== Summary ===
- The Greenville Braves finished the season with the best record in the league for the first time since 1988.

=== Standings ===
East Division
Team	Win	Loss	%	GB
Greenville Braves	88	56	.611	–
Orlando Sun Rays	77	67	.535	11
Jacksonville Suns	74	69	.517	13.5
Charlotte Knights	74	70	.514	14
Carolina Mudcats	66	76	.465	21
West Division
Birmingham Barons	77	66	.538	–
Chattanooga Lookouts	73	71	.507	4.5
Knoxville Blue Jays	67	77	.465	10.5
Huntsville Stars	61	83	.424	16.5
Memphis Chicks	61	83	.424	16.5

== League Leaders ==
=== Batting leaders ===
Stat	Player	Total
AVG	Jim Bowie, Jacksonville Suns	.310
H	Fernando Ramsey, Charlotte Knights	151
R	Ron Coomer, Birmingham Barons	81
2B	Jeff Kent, Knoxville Blue Jays	34
3B	Benny Colvard, Chattanooga Lookouts; Kinnis Pledger, Birmingham Barons; Reggie Sanders, Chattanooga Lookouts	8
HR	Elvin Paulino, Charlotte Knights	24
RBI	Elvin Paulino, Charlotte Knights	81
SB	Shawn Gilbert, Orlando Sun Rays	43

=== Pitching leaders ===
Stat	Player	Total
W	Nap Robinson, Greenville Braves	16
ERA	Pat Mahomes, Orlando Sun Rays	1.78
CG	Jim Bullinger, Charlotte Knights; Tim Wakefield, Carolina Mudcats	8
SHO	Mike Anderson, Chattanooga Lookouts; Jimmy Rogers, Knoxville Blue Jays; José Ventura, Birmingham Barons	3
SV	Tim Peek, Huntsville Stars	26
IP	Mike Trombley, Orlando Sun Rays	191.0
SO	Mike Trombley, Orlando Sun Rays	175

== Playoffs ==
- The Orlando Sun Rays won their second Southern League championship, defeating the Birmingham Barons in four games.

=== Playoff bracket ===
Division finals
E1	Greenville	0
E2	Orlando	3
W1	Birmingham	3
W2	Knoxville	1

Finals
E2	Orlando	3
W1	Birmingham	1

== Awards ==
Southern League awards
Award name	Recipient
Most Valuable Player	Ryan Klesko, Greenville Braves
Pitcher of the Year	Mark Wohlers, Greenville Braves
Manager of the Year	Chris Chambliss, Greenville Braves

== See also ==
- 1991 Major League Baseball season
