= 1997 Southern League season =

- League: Southern League
- Sport: Baseball
- Duration: April 3 – September 1
- Number of games: 140
- Number of teams: 10

Regular season
- League champions: Huntsville Stars
- Season MVP: Ben Grieve, Huntsville Stars

Playoffs
- League champions: Greenville Braves
- Runners-up: Huntsville Stars

SL seasons
- ← 1996 1998 →

The 1997 Southern League was a Class AA baseball season played between April 3 and September 1. Ten teams played a 140-game schedule, with the top team in each division in each half of the season qualifying for the post-season.

The Greenville Braves won the Southern League championship, as they defeated the Huntsville Stars in the playoffs.

== Team changes ==
- The Port City Roosters relocated to Mobile, Alabama and were renamed to the Mobile BayBears. The team moved from the East Division to the West Division. The club ended their affiliation with the Seattle Mariners and began a new affiliation with the San Diego Padres.
- The Knoxville Smokies moved from the West Division to the East Division.
- The Memphis Chicks ended their affiliation with the San Diego Padres and began a new affiliation with the Seattle Mariners.
- The Orlando Cubs are renamed to the Orlando Rays. The club remained affiliated with the Chicago Cubs.

== Teams ==
1997 Southern League
Division	Team	City	MLB Affiliate	Stadium
East	Carolina Mudcats	Zebulon, North Carolina	Pittsburgh Pirates	Five County Stadium
East	Greenville Braves	Greenville, South Carolina	Atlanta Braves	Greenville Municipal Stadium
East	Jacksonville Suns	Jacksonville, Florida	Detroit Tigers	Wolfson Park
East	Knoxville Smokies	Knoxville, Tennessee	Toronto Blue Jays	Bill Meyer Stadium
East	Orlando Rays	Orlando, Florida	Chicago Cubs	Tinker Field
West	Birmingham Barons	Birmingham, Alabama	Chicago White Sox	Hoover Metropolitan Stadium
West	Chattanooga Lookouts	Chattanooga, Tennessee	Cincinnati Reds	Engel Stadium
West	Huntsville Stars	Huntsville, Alabama	Oakland Athletics	Joe W. Davis Stadium
West	Memphis Chicks	Memphis, Tennessee	Seattle Mariners	Tim McCarver Stadium
West	Mobile BayBears	Mobile, Alabama	San Diego Padres	Hank Aaron Stadium

== Map of teams ==
East Division West Division

== Regular season ==
=== Summary ===
- The Huntsville Stars finished the season with the best record in the league for the first time since 1994.

=== Standings ===
East Division
Team	Win	Loss	%	GB
Knoxville Smokies	75	63	.543	–
Greenville Braves	74	66	.529	2
Jacksonville Suns	66	73	.475	9.5
Orlando Rays	63	75	.457	12
Carolina Mudcats	55	82	.401	19.5
West Division
Huntsville Stars	77	62	.554	–
Birmingham Barons	76	62	.551	0.5
Chattanooga Lookouts	70	69	.504	7
Mobile BayBears	69	68	.504	7
Memphis Chicks	67	72	.482	10

== League Leaders ==
=== Batting leaders ===
Stat	Player	Total
AVG	Mike Neill, Huntsville Stars	.340
H	D. T. Cromer, Huntsville Stars	176
R	Mike Neill, Huntsville Stars	129
2B	D. T. Cromer, Huntsville Stars	40
3B	Brian Simmons, Birmingham Barons	12
HR	Mike Coolbaugh, Huntsville Stars; Luis Raven, Birminghan Barons; Kevin Witt, Knoxville Smokies	30
RBI	Mike Coolbaugh, Huntsville Stars	132
SB	Earl Johnson, Mobile / Jacksonville	42

=== Pitching leaders ===
Stat	Player	Total
W	Scott Eyre, Birmingham Barons; Russ Herbert, Birmingham Barons	13
ERA	Russ Herbert, Birmingham Barons	3.63
CG	Brett Hinchliffe, Memphis Chicks	5
SHO	Ken Cloude, Memphis Chicks; Ryan Franklin, Memphis Chicks; Jason Stevenson, Knoxville Smokies	2
SV	Todd Williams, Chattanooga Lookouts	31
IP	Bill King, Huntsville Stars; Brandon Reed	176.0
SO	Earl Byrne, Orlando Rays	128

== Playoffs ==
- The Greenville Braves won their second Southern League championship, defeating the Huntsville Stars in five games.

=== Playoff bracket ===
Division finals
E1	Knoxville	1
E2	Greenville	3
W1	Huntsville	3
W2	Mobile	2

Finals
E2	Greenville	3
W1	Huntsville	2

== Awards ==
Southern League awards
Award name	Recipient
Most Valuable Player	Ben Grieve, Huntsville Stars
Pitcher of the Year	Scott Eyre, Birmingham Barons
Manager of the Year	Randy Ingle, Greenville Braves

== See also ==
- 1997 Major League Baseball season
