= 1993 Southern League season =

- League: Southern League
- Sport: Baseball
- Duration: April 8 – September 5
- Number of games: 144
- Number of teams: 10

Regular season
- League champions: Birmingham Barons
- Season MVP: Carlos Delgado, Knoxville Blue Jays

Playoffs
- League champions: Birmingham Barons
- Runners-up: Knoxville Blue Jays

SL seasons
- ← 1992 1994 →

The 1993 Southern League was a Class AA baseball season played between April 8 and September 5. Ten teams played a 144-game schedule, with the top team in each division in each half of the season qualifying for the post-season.

The Birmingham Barons won the Southern League championship, as they defeated the Knoxville Blue Jays in the playoffs.

== Team changes ==
- The Charlotte Knights leave the league and join the International League.
- The Nashville Xpress join the league as an expansion team and join the West Division. The team begins an affiliation with the Minnesota Twins.
- The Knoxville Blue Jays move from the West Division to the East Division.
- The Orlando Sun Rays ended their affiliation with the Minnesota Twins and began a new affiliation with the Chicago Cubs. The club is renamed to the Orlando Cubs.

== Teams ==
1993 Southern League
Division	Team	City	MLB Affiliate	Stadium
East	Carolina Mudcats	Zebulon, North Carolina	Pittsburgh Pirates	Five County Stadium
East	Greenville Braves	Greenville, South Carolina	Atlanta Braves	Greenville Municipal Stadium
East	Jacksonville Suns	Jacksonville, Florida	Seattle Mariners	Wolfson Park
East	Knoxville Blue Jays	Knoxville, Tennessee	Toronto Blue Jays	Bill Meyer Stadium
East	Orlando Cubs	Orlando, Florida	Chicago Cubs	Tinker Field
West	Birmingham Barons	Birmingham, Alabama	Chicago White Sox	Hoover Metropolitan Stadium
West	Chattanooga Lookouts	Chattanooga, Tennessee	Cincinnati Reds	Engel Stadium
West	Huntsville Stars	Huntsville, Alabama	Oakland Athletics	Joe W. Davis Stadium
West	Memphis Chicks	Memphis, Tennessee	Kansas City Royals	Tim McCarver Stadium
West	Nashville Xpress	Nashville, Tennessee	Minnesota Twins	Herschel Greer Stadium

== Map of teams ==
East Division West Division

== Regular season ==
=== Summary ===
- The Birmingham Barons finished the season with the best record in the league for the first time since 1989.

=== Standings ===
East Division
Team	Win	Loss	%	GB
Greenville Braves	75	67	.528	–
Carolina Mudcats	74	67	.525	0.5
Orlando Cubs	71	70	.504	3.5
Knoxville Blue Jays	70	70	.500	4
Jacksonville Suns	59	81	.421	15
West Division
Birmingham Barons	78	64	.549	–
Chattanooga Lookouts	72	69	.511	5.5
Nashville Xpress	72	70	.507	6
Huntsville Stars	71	70	.504	6.5
Memphis Chicks	63	77	.450	14

== League Leaders ==
=== Batting leaders ===
Stat	Player	Total
AVG	Jim Bowie, Huntsville Stars	.333
H	Jim Bowie, Huntsville Stars	167
R	Rich Becker, Nashville Xpress; Alex Gonzalez, Knoxville Blue Jays	93
2B	Jerry Wolak, Birmingham Barons	35
3B	Ray Durham, Birmingham Barons	10
HR	Carlos Delgado, Knoxville Blue Jays	25
RBI	Carlos Delgado, Knoxville Blue Jays	102
SB	Brandon Wilson, Birmingham Barons	43

=== Pitching leaders ===
Stat	Player	Total
W	Mike Ferry, Chattanooga Lookouts; Huck Flener, Knoxville Blue Jays	13
ERA	James Baldwin, Birmingham Barons	2.25
CG	James Baldwin, Birmingham Barons; Mike Ferry, Chattanooga Lookouts; Jeff Mansur, Nashville Xpress	4
SHO	Scott Ruffcorn, Birmingham Barons	3
SV	Chris Bushing, Chattanooga Lookouts	29
IP	Mike Ferry, Chattanooga Lookouts	186.2
SO	Scott Ruffcorn, Birmingham Barons	141

== Playoffs ==
- The Birmingham Barons won their fifth Southern League championship, defeating the Knoxville Blue Jays in four games.

=== Playoff bracket ===
Division finals
E1	Greenville	2
E2	Knoxville	3
W1	Birmingham	3
W2	Nashville	0

Finals
E2	Knoxville	1
W1	Birmingham	3

== Awards ==
Southern League awards
Award name	Recipient
Most Valuable Player	Carlos Delgado, Knoxville Blue Jays
Pitcher of the Year	Oscar Munoz, Nashville Xpress
Manager of the Year	Terry Francona, Birmingham Barons

== See also ==
- 1993 Major League Baseball season
