= 1992 Southern League season =

- League: Southern League
- Sport: Baseball
- Duration: April 9 – September 5
- Number of games: 144
- Number of teams: 10

Regular season
- League champions: Greenville Braves
- Season MVP: Javy López, Greenville Braves

Playoffs
- League champions: Greenville Braves
- Runners-up: Chattanooga Lookouts

SL seasons
- ← 1991 1993 →

The 1992 Southern League was a Class AA baseball season played between April 9 and September 5. Ten teams played a 144-game schedule, with the top team in each division in each half of the season qualifying for the post-season.

The Greenville Braves won the Southern League championship, as they defeated the Chattanooga Lookouts in the playoffs.

== Teams ==
1992 Southern League
Division	Team	City	MLB Affiliate	Stadium
East	Carolina Mudcats	Zebulon, North Carolina	Pittsburgh Pirates	Five County Stadium
East	Charlotte Knights	Charlotte, North Carolina	Chicago Cubs	Knights Stadium
East	Greenville Braves	Greenville, South Carolina	Atlanta Braves	Greenville Municipal Stadium
East	Jacksonville Suns	Jacksonville, Florida	Seattle Mariners	Wolfson Park
East	Orlando Sun Rays	Orlando, Florida	Minnesota Twins	Tinker Field
West	Birmingham Barons	Birmingham, Alabama	Chicago White Sox	Hoover Metropolitan Stadium
West	Chattanooga Lookouts	Chattanooga, Tennessee	Cincinnati Reds	Engel Stadium
West	Huntsville Stars	Huntsville, Alabama	Oakland Athletics	Joe W. Davis Stadium
West	Knoxville Blue Jays	Knoxville, Tennessee	Toronto Blue Jays	Bill Meyer Stadium
West	Memphis Chicks	Memphis, Tennessee	Kansas City Royals	Tim McCarver Stadium

== Map of teams ==
East Division West Division

== Regular season ==
=== Summary ===
- The Greenville Braves finished the season with the best record in the league for the second consecutive season.

=== Standings ===
East Division
Team	Win	Loss	%	GB
Greenville Braves	100	43	.699	–
Charlotte Knights	70	73	.490	30
Jacksonville Suns	68	75	.476	32
Orlando Sun Rays	60	82	.423	39.5
Carolina Mudcats	52	92	.361	48.5
West Division
Chattanooga Lookouts	90	53	.629	–
Huntsville Stars	81	63	.563	9.5
Memphis Chicks	71	73	.493	19.5
Birmingham Barons	68	74	.479	21.5
Knoxville Blue Jays	56	88	.389	34.5

== League Leaders ==
=== Batting leaders ===
Stat	Player	Total
AVG	Scott Pose, Chattanooga Lookouts	.342
H	Scott Pose, Chattanooga Lookouts	180
R	Scott Pose, Chattanooga Lookouts	87
2B	Rex De La Nuez, Orlando Sun Rays; Nigel Wilson, Knoxville Blue Jays	34
3B	Juan De La Rosa; Knoxville Blue Jays	12
HR	Tim Costo, Chattanooga Lookouts	28
RBI	Scott Cepicky, Birmingham Barons	87
SB	Tow Maynard, Jacksonville Suns	38

=== Pitching leaders ===
Stat	Player	Total
W	Mike Anderson, Chattanooga Lookouts; Nate Minchey, Greenville Braves; Bronswell Patrick, Huntsville Stars; Steve Trachsel, Charlotte Knights	13
ERA	Larry Thomas, Birmingham Barons	1.94
CG	José Ventura, Birmingham / Memphis	9
SHO	Mike Anderson, Chattanooga Lookouts; Nate Minchey, Greenville Braves; José Ventura, Birmingham / Memphis	4
SV	Jerry Spradlin, Chattanooga Lookouts	34
IP	Steve Trachsel, Charlotte Knights	191.0
SO	Jim Converse, Jacksonville Suns	157

== Playoffs ==
- The Greenville Braves won their first Southern League championship, defeating the Chattanooga Lookouts in five games.

=== Playoff bracket ===
Division finals
E1	Greenville	3
E2	Charlotte	0
W1	Chattanooga	3
W2	Huntsville	1

Finals
E1	Greenville	3
W1	Chattanooga	2

== Awards ==
Southern League awards
Award name	Recipient
Most Valuable Player	Javy López, Greenville Braves
Pitcher of the Year	Jim Converse, Jacksonville Suns; Jerry Spradlin, Chattanooga Lookouts
Manager of the Year	Grady Little, Greenville Braves

== See also ==
- 1992 Major League Baseball season
