= 1996 Southern League season =

- League: Southern League
- Sport: Baseball
- Duration: April 4 – September 2
- Number of games: 140
- Number of teams: 10

Regular season
- League champions: Memphis Chicks
- Season MVP: Derrek Lee, Memphis Chicks

Playoffs
- League champions: Jacksonville Suns
- Runners-up: Chattanooga Lookouts

SL seasons
- ← 1995 1997 →

The 1996 Southern League was a Class AA baseball season played between April 4 and September 2. Ten teams played a 140-game schedule, with the top team in each division in each half of the season qualifying for the post-season.

The Jacksonville Suns won the Southern League championship, as they defeated the Chattanooga Lookouts in the playoffs.

== Teams ==
1996 Southern League
Division	Team	City	MLB Affiliate	Stadium
East	Carolina Mudcats	Zebulon, North Carolina	Pittsburgh Pirates	Five County Stadium
East	Greenville Braves	Greenville, South Carolina	Atlanta Braves	Greenville Municipal Stadium
East	Jacksonville Suns	Jacksonville, Florida	Detroit Tigers	Wolfson Park
East	Orlando Cubs	Orlando, Florida	Chicago Cubs	Tinker Field
East	Port City Roosters	Wilmington, North Carolina	Seattle Mariners	Brooks Field
West	Birmingham Barons	Birmingham, Alabama	Chicago White Sox	Hoover Metropolitan Stadium
West	Chattanooga Lookouts	Chattanooga, Tennessee	Cincinnati Reds	Engel Stadium
West	Huntsville Stars	Huntsville, Alabama	Oakland Athletics	Joe W. Davis Stadium
West	Knoxville Smokies	Knoxville, Tennessee	Toronto Blue Jays	Bill Meyer Stadium
West	Memphis Chicks	Memphis, Tennessee	San Diego Padres	Tim McCarver Stadium

== Map of teams ==
East Division West Division

== Regular season ==
=== Summary ===
- The Memphis Chicks finished the season with the best record in the league for the first time in franchise history.

=== Standings ===
East Division
Team	Win	Loss	%	GB
Jacksonville Suns	75	63	.543	–
Carolina Mudcats	70	69	.504	5.5
Orlando Cubs	61	78	.439	14.5
Greenville Braves	58	82	.414	18
Port City Roosters	56	84	.400	20
West Division
Memphis Chicks	81	58	.583	–
Chattanooga Lookouts	81	59	.579	0.5
Knoxville Smokies	75	65	.536	6.5
Birmingham Barons	74	65	.532	7
Huntsville Stars	66	74	.471	15.5

== League Leaders ==
=== Batting leaders ===
Stat	Player	Total
AVG	Dan Rohrmeier, Memphis Chicks	.344
H	Dan Rohrmeier, Memphis Chicks	162
R	Mike Cameron, Birmingham Barons	120
2B	Aaron Boone, Chattanooga Lookouts	44
3B	Demond Smith, Huntsville Stars	14
HR	Derrek Lee, Memphis Chicks	34
RBI	Derrek Lee, Memphis Chicks	104
SB	Mike Cameron, Birmingham Barons	39

=== Pitching leaders ===
Stat	Player	Total
W	Brian Moehler, Jacksonville Suns	15
ERA	Shane Dennis, Memphis Chicks	2.27
CG	Rich Pratt, Birmingham Barons	5
SHO	Stacy Hollins, Huntsville Stars; Rich Pratt, Birmingham Barons	2
SV	Domingo Jean, Chattanooga Lookouts	31
IP	Wade Walker, Orlando Cubs	187.2
SO	Curt Lyons, Chattanooga Lookouts	176

== Playoffs ==
- The Jacksonville Suns won their first Southern League championship, defeating the Chattanooga Lookouts in four games.

=== Playoff bracket ===
Division finals
E1	Jacksonville	3
E2	Carolina	2
W1	Memphis	2
W2	Chattanooga	3

Finals
E1	Jacksonville	3
W2	Chattanooga	1

== Awards ==
Southern League awards
Award name	Recipient
Most Valuable Player	Derrek Lee, Memphis Chicks
Pitcher of the Year	Curt Lyons, Chattanooga Lookouts
Manager of the Year	Mark Berry, Chattanooga Lookouts

== See also ==
- 1996 Major League Baseball season
