= 1995 Southern League season =

- League: Southern League
- Sport: Baseball
- Duration: April 6 – September 4
- Number of games: 144
- Number of teams: 10

Regular season
- League champions: Carolina Mudcats
- Season MVP: Jason Kendall, Carolina Mudcats

Playoffs
- League champions: Carolina Mudcats
- Runners-up: Chattanooga Lookouts

SL seasons
- ← 1994 1996 →

The 1995 Southern League was a Class AA baseball season played between April 6 and September 4. Ten teams played a 144-game schedule, with the top team in each division in each half of the season qualifying for the post-season.

The Carolina Mudcats won the Southern League championship, as they defeated the Chattanooga Lookouts in the playoffs.

== Team changes ==
- The Nashville Xpress relocated to Wilmington, North Carolina and were renamed to the Port City Roosters. The team moved from the West Division to the East Division. The club ended their affiliation with the Minnesota Twins and began a new affiliation with the Seattle Mariners.
- The Jacksonville Suns ended their affiliation with the Seattle Mariners and began a new affiliation with the Detroit Tigers.
- The Knoxville Smokies moved from the East Division to the West Division.
- The Memphis Chicks ended their affiliation with the Kansas City Royals and began a new affiliation with the San Diego Padres.

== Teams ==
1995 Southern League
Division	Team	City	MLB Affiliate	Stadium
East	Carolina Mudcats	Zebulon, North Carolina	Pittsburgh Pirates	Five County Stadium
East	Greenville Braves	Greenville, South Carolina	Atlanta Braves	Greenville Municipal Stadium
East	Jacksonville Suns	Jacksonville, Florida	Detroit Tigers	Wolfson Park
East	Orlando Cubs	Orlando, Florida	Chicago Cubs	Tinker Field
East	Port City Roosters	Wilmington, North Carolina	Seattle Mariners	Brooks Field
West	Birmingham Barons	Birmingham, Alabama	Chicago White Sox	Hoover Metropolitan Stadium
West	Chattanooga Lookouts	Chattanooga, Tennessee	Cincinnati Reds	Engel Stadium
West	Huntsville Stars	Huntsville, Alabama	Oakland Athletics	Joe W. Davis Stadium
West	Knoxville Smokies	Knoxville, Tennessee	Toronto Blue Jays	Bill Meyer Stadium
West	Memphis Chicks	Memphis, Tennessee	San Diego Padres	Tim McCarver Stadium

== Map of teams ==
East Division West Division

== Regular season ==
=== Summary ===
- The Carolina Mudcats finished the season with the best record in the league for the first time in franchise history.

=== Standings ===
East Division
Team	Win	Loss	%	GB
Carolina Mudcats	89	55	.618	–
Orlando Cubs	76	67	.531	12.5
Jacksonville Suns	75	69	.521	14
Port City Roosters	62	80	.437	26
Greenville Braves	59	83	.415	29
West Division
Chattanooga Lookouts	83	60	.580	–
Birmingham Barons	80	64	.556	3.5
Huntsville Stars	70	74	.486	13.5
Memphis Chicks	68	74	.479	14.5
Knoxville Smokies	54	90	.375	29.5

== League Leaders ==
=== Batting leaders ===
Stat	Player	Total
AVG	Jason Kendall, Carolina Mudcats	.326
H	Ruben Santana, Chattanooga Lookouts	163
R	Essex Burton, Birmingham Barons	95
2B	Jim Bonnici, Port City Roosters	36
3B	Lorenzo De La Cruz, Knoxville Smokies	12
HR	Iván Cruz, Jacksonville Suns	31
RBI	George Canale, Carolina Mudcats	102
SB	Essex Burton, Birmingham Barons	60

=== Pitching leaders ===
Stat	Player	Total
W	Elmer Dessens, Carolina Mudcats	15
ERA	Elmer Dessens, Carolina Mudcats	2.49
CG	Rob Mattson, Memphis Chicks	11
SHO	Rob Mattson, Memphis Chicks; Matt Ruebel, Carolina Mudcats; Clint Sodowsky, Jacksonville Suns	3
SV	John Kelly, Jacksonville Suns; Rusty Kilgo, Chattanooga Lookouts	29
IP	Rob Mattson, Memphis Chicks	202.1
SO	Osvaldo Fernández, Port City Roosters	162

== Playoffs ==
- The Carolina Mudcats won their first Southern League championship, defeating the Chattanooga Lookouts in five games.

=== Playoff bracket ===
Division finals
E1	Carolina	3
E2	Orlando	2
W1	Chattanooga	3
W2	Memphis	2

Finals
E1	Carolina	3
W1	Chattanooga	2

== Awards ==
Southern League awards
Award name	Recipient
Most Valuable Player	Jason Kendall, Carolina Mudcats
Pitcher of the Year	Luis Andújar, Birmingham Barons
Manager of the Year	Bruce Kimm, Orlando Cubs

== See also ==
- 1995 Major League Baseball season
