= 1985 Southern League season =

- League: Southern League
- Sport: Baseball
- Duration: April 11 – September 2
- Number of games: 144
- Number of teams: 10

Regular season
- League champions: Knoxville Blue Jays
- Season MVP: Jose Canseco, Huntsville Stars

Playoffs
- League champions: Huntsville Stars
- Runners-up: Charlotte Orioles

SL seasons
- ← 1984 1986 →

The 1985 Southern League was a Class AA baseball season played between April 11 and September 2. Ten teams played a 144-game schedule, with the top team in each division in each half of the season qualifying for the post-season.

The Huntsville Stars won the Southern League championship, as they defeated the Charlotte Orioles in the playoffs.

== Team changes ==
- The Nashville Sounds leave the league and join the American Association.
- The Huntsville Stars join the league as an expansion team. The club begins an affiliation with the Oakland Athletics.
- The Jacksonville Suns are renamed to the Jacksonville Expos. The club remained affiliated with the Montreal Expos.

== Teams ==
1985 Southern League
Division	Team	City	MLB Affiliate	Stadium
East	Charlotte Orioles	Charlotte, North Carolina	Baltimore Orioles	Jim Crockett Memorial Park
East	Columbus Astros	Columbus, Georgia	Houston Astros	Golden Park
East	Greenville Braves	Greenville, South Carolina	Atlanta Braves	Greenville Municipal Stadium
East	Jacksonville Expos	Jacksonville, Florida	Montreal Expos	Wolfson Park
East	Orlando Twins	Orlando, Florida	Minnesota Twins	Tinker Field
West	Birmingham Barons	Birmingham, Alabama	Detroit Tigers	Rickwood Field
West	Chattanooga Lookouts	Chattanooga, Tennessee	Seattle Mariners	Engel Stadium
West	Huntsville Stars	Huntsville, Alabama	Oakland Athletics	Joe W. Davis Stadium
West	Knoxville Blue Jays	Knoxville, Tennessee	Toronto Blue Jays	Bill Meyer Stadium
West	Memphis Chicks	Memphis, Tennessee	Kansas City Royals	Tim McCarver Stadium

== Map of teams ==
East Division West Division

== Regular season ==
=== Summary ===
- The Knoxville Blue Jays finished the season with the best record in the league for the first time since 1978.

=== Standings ===
East Division
Team	Win	Loss	%	GB
Columbus Astros	79	65	.549	–
Charlotte Orioles	78	65	.545	0.5
Jacksonville Expos	73	70	.510	5.5
Orlando Twins	72	71	.503	6.5
Greenville Braves	70	74	.486	9
West Division
Knoxville Blue Jays	79	64	.552	–
Huntsville Stars	78	66	.542	1.5
Chattanooga Lookouts	66	77	.462	13
Memphis Chicks	65	79	.451	14.5
Birmingham Barons	57	86	.399	22

== League Leaders ==
=== Batting leaders ===
Stat	Player	Total
AVG	Bruce Fields, Birmingham Barons	.323
H	Alex Marte, Orlando Twins	171
R	Alex Marte, Orlando Twins	117
2B	Jim Sherman, Columbus Astros; Kelvin Torve, Charlotte Orioles	34
3B	Luis Polonia, Huntsville Stars	18
HR	Mark Funderburk, Orlando Twins	34
RBI	Mark Funderburk, Orlando Twins	116
SB	Alex Marte, Orlando Twins	64

=== Pitching leaders ===
Stat	Player	Total
W	Steve Davis, Knoxville Blue Jays	17
ERA	Steve Davis, Knoxville Blue Jays	2.45
CG	Les Straker, Orlando Twins	12
SHO	Steve Davis, Knoxville Blue Jays; Les Straker, Orlando Twins	3
SV	Luis Aquino, Knoxville Blue Jays	20
IP	Les Straker, Orlando Twins	193.0
SO	Scott Bankhead, Memphis Chicks; John Hoover, Charlotte Orioles	128

== Playoffs ==
- The Huntsville Stars won their first Southern League championship, defeating the Charlotte Orioles in five games.

=== Playoff bracket ===
Division finals
E1	Columbus	1
E2	Charlotte	3
W1	Knoxville	1
W2	Huntsville	3

Finals
E2	Charlotte	2
W2	Huntsville	3

== Awards ==
Southern League awards
Award name	Recipient
Most Valuable Player	Jose Canseco, Huntsville Stars
Pitcher of the Year	Steve Davis, Knoxville Blue Jays
Manager of the Year	Carlos Alfonso, Columbus Astros; John McLaren, Knoxville Blue Jays

== See also ==
- 1985 Major League Baseball season
