= 1990 Southern League season =

- League: Southern League
- Sport: Baseball
- Duration: April 6 – September 1
- Number of games: 144
- Number of teams: 10

Regular season
- League champions: Orlando Sun Rays
- Season MVP: Jeff Conine, Memphis Chicks

Playoffs
- League champions: Memphis Chicks
- Runners-up: Orlando Sun Rays

SL seasons
- ← 1989 1991 →

The 1990 Southern League was a Class AA baseball season played between April 6 and September 1. Ten teams played a 144-game schedule, with the top team in each division in each half of the season qualifying for the post-season.

The Memphis Chicks won the Southern League championship, as they defeated the Orlando Sun Rays in the playoffs.

== Team changes ==
- The Orlando Twins are renamed to the Orlando Sun Rays. The club remained affiliated with the Minnesota Twins.

== Teams ==
1990 Southern League
| Division | Team | City | MLB Affiliate | Stadium |
| East | Charlotte Knights | Charlotte, North Carolina | Chicago Cubs | Knights Stadium |
| East | Columbus Mudcats | Columbus, Georgia | Houston Astros | Golden Park |
| East | Greenville Braves | Greenville, South Carolina | Atlanta Braves | Greenville Municipal Stadium |
| East | Jacksonville Expos | Jacksonville, Florida | Montreal Expos | Wolfson Park |
| East | Orlando Sun Rays | Orlando, Florida | Minnesota Twins | Tinker Field |
| West | Birmingham Barons | Birmingham, Alabama | Chicago White Sox | Hoover Metropolitan Stadium |
| West | Chattanooga Lookouts | Chattanooga, Tennessee | Cincinnati Reds | Engel Stadium |
| West | Huntsville Stars | Huntsville, Alabama | Oakland Athletics | Joe W. Davis Stadium |
| West | Knoxville Blue Jays | Knoxville, Tennessee | Toronto Blue Jays | Bill Meyer Stadium |
| West | Memphis Chicks | Memphis, Tennessee | Kansas City Royals | Tim McCarver Stadium |

== Map of teams ==
East Division West Division

== Regular season ==
=== Summary ===
- The Orlando Sun Rays finished the season with the best record in the league for the first time since 1975.
- Despite finishing with the best overall record in the West Division, the Huntsville Stars failed to qualify for the post-season, as they did not have the best record in either half of the season.

=== Standings ===
East Division
| Team | Win | Loss | % | GB |
|---|---|---|---|---|
| Orlando Sun Rays | 85 | 59 | .590 | – |
| Jacksonville Expos | 84 | 60 | .583 | 1 |
| Columbus Mudcats | 67 | 77 | .465 | 18 |
| Charlotte Knights | 65 | 79 | .451 | 20 |
| Greenville Braves | 57 | 87 | .396 | 28 |
West Division
| Huntsville Stars | 79 | 65 | .549 | – |
| Birmingham Barons | 77 | 67 | .535 | 2 |
| Memphis Chicks | 73 | 71 | .507 | 6 |
| Knoxville Blue Jays | 67 | 77 | .465 | 12 |
| Chattanooga Lookouts | 66 | 78 | .458 | 13 |

== League Leaders ==
=== Batting leaders ===
| Stat | Player | Total |
|---|---|---|
| AVG | Adam Casillas, Chattanooga Lookouts | .336 |
| H | Scott Brosius, Huntsville Stars | 162 |
| R | Jarvis Brown, Orlando Sun Rays | 104 |
| 2B | Scott Brosius, Huntsville Stars | 39 |
| 3B | Andújar Cedeño, Columbus Mudcats | 11 |
| HR | Luis Gonzalez, Columbus Mudcats; Terrel Hansen, Jacksonville Expos | 24 |
| RBI | Matt Stark, Birmingham Barons | 109 |
| SB | Paul Rodgers, Knoxville Blue Jays | 41 |

=== Pitching leaders ===
| Stat | Player | Total |
|---|---|---|
| W | Doug Simons, Orlando Sun Rays | 15 |
| ERA | Jeff Carter, Jacksonville Expos | 1.84 |
| CG | Richie Leblanc, Memphis Chicks; Ross Powell, Chattanooga Lookouts | 6 |
| SHO | Pete Blohm, Knoxville Blue Jays; Blaise Ilsley, Columbus Mudcats | 3 |
| SV | Steve Chitren, Huntsville Stars | 27 |
| IP | Brian Barnes, Jacksonville Expos | 201.1 |
| SO | Brian Barnes, Jacksonville Expos | 213 |

== Playoffs ==
- The Memphis Chicks won their first Southern League championship, defeating the Orlando Sun Rays in five games.

=== Playoff bracket ===
Division finals
E1 | Orlando | 3
E2 | Jacksonville | 1
W1 | Birmingham | 1
W2 | Memphis | 3

Finals
E1 | Orlando | 2
W1 | Memphis | 3

== Awards ==
Southern League awards
| Award name | Recipient |
|---|---|
| Most Valuable Player | Jeff Conine, Memphis Chicks |
| Pitcher of the Year | Brian Barnes, Jacksonville Expos |
| Manager of the Year | Ron Gardenhire, Orlando Sun Rays; Jerry Manuel, Jacksonville Expos |

== See also ==
- 1990 Major League Baseball season
