= 1994 Southern League season =

- League: Southern League
- Sport: Baseball
- Duration: April 7 – September 3
- Number of games: 140
- Number of teams: 10

Regular season
- League champions: Huntsville Stars
- Season MVP: Mark Johnson, Carolina Mudcats

Playoffs
- League champions: Huntsville Stars
- Runners-up: Carolina Mudcats

SL seasons
- ← 1993 1995 →

The 1994 Southern League was a Class AA baseball season played between April 7 and September 3. Ten teams played a 140-game schedule, with the top team in each division in each half of the season qualifying for the post-season.

The Huntsville Stars won the Southern League championship, as they defeated the Carolina Mudcats in the playoffs.

== Team changes ==
- The Knoxville Blue Jays are renamed to the Knoxville Smokies. The club remained affiliated with the Toronto Blue Jays.

== Teams ==
1994 Southern League
Division	Team	City	MLB Affiliate	Stadium
East	Carolina Mudcats	Zebulon, North Carolina	Pittsburgh Pirates	Five County Stadium
East	Greenville Braves	Greenville, South Carolina	Atlanta Braves	Greenville Municipal Stadium
East	Jacksonville Suns	Jacksonville, Florida	Seattle Mariners	Wolfson Park
East	Knoxville Smokies	Knoxville, Tennessee	Toronto Blue Jays	Bill Meyer Stadium
East	Orlando Cubs	Orlando, Florida	Chicago Cubs	Tinker Field
West	Birmingham Barons	Birmingham, Alabama	Chicago White Sox	Hoover Metropolitan Stadium
West	Chattanooga Lookouts	Chattanooga, Tennessee	Cincinnati Reds	Engel Stadium
West	Huntsville Stars	Huntsville, Alabama	Oakland Athletics	Joe W. Davis Stadium
West	Memphis Chicks	Memphis, Tennessee	Kansas City Royals	Tim McCarver Stadium
West	Nashville Xpress	Nashville, Tennessee	Minnesota Twins	Herschel Greer Stadium

== Map of teams ==
East Division West Division

== Regular season ==
=== Summary ===
- The Huntsville Stars finished the season with the best record in the league for the first time since 1986.

=== Standings ===
East Division
Team	Win	Loss	%	GB
Greenville Braves	73	63	.537	–
Carolina Mudcats	74	66	.529	0.5
Knoxville Smokies	64	76	.457	10.5
Jacksonville Suns	60	77	.438	13.5
Orlando Cubs	59	78	.431	14.5
West Division
Huntsville Stars	81	57	.587	–
Memphis Chicks	75	62	.547	5.5
Nashville Xpress	74	66	.529	8
Chattanooga Lookouts	67	73	.479	15
Birmingham Barons	65	74	.468	16.5

== League Leaders ==
=== Batting leaders ===
Stat	Player	Total
AVG	Trey Beamon, Carolina Mudcats	.323
H	Chris Stynes, Knoxville Smokies	173
R	Kerwin Moore, Huntsville Stars	97
2B	Dan Rohrmeier, Memphis / Chattanooga	41
3B	Brent Bowers, Knoxville Smokies	11
HR	Mark Johnson, Carolina Mudcats	23
RBI	Chris Weinke, Knoxville Smokies	87
SB	Kerwin Moore, Huntsville Stars	54

=== Pitching leaders ===
Stat	Player	Total
W	Blaine Beatty, Chattanooga Lookouts	14
ERA	Blaine Beatty, Chattanooga Lookouts	2.39
CG	Gary Wilson, Carolina Mudcats	7
SHO	Blaine Beatty, Chattanooga Lookouts	4
SV	Brad Clontz, Greenville Braves	27
IP	Blaine Beatty, Chattanooga Lookouts	196.1
SO	Blaine Beatty, Chattanooga Lookouts	162

== Playoffs ==
- The Huntsville Stars won their second Southern League championship, defeating the Carolina Mudcats in four games.

=== Playoff bracket ===
Division finals
E1	Greenville	2
E2	Carolina	3
W1	Huntsville	3
W2	Chattanooga	0

Finals
E2	Carolina	1
W1	Huntsville	3

== Awards ==
Southern League awards
Award name	Recipient
Most Valuable Player	Mark Johnson, Carolina Mudcats
Pitcher of the Year	Brad Clontz, Greenville Braves
Manager of the Year	Gary Jones, Huntsville Stars

== See also ==
- 1994 Major League Baseball season
