= 1986 Southern League season =

- League: Southern League
- Sport: Baseball
- Duration: April 11 – September 1
- Number of games: 144
- Number of teams: 10

Regular season
- League champions: Huntsville Stars
- Season MVP: Terry Steinbach, Huntsville Stars

Playoffs
- League champions: Columbus Astros
- Runners-up: Huntsville Stars

SL seasons
- ← 1985 1987 →

The 1986 Southern League was a Class AA baseball season played between April 11 and September 1. Ten teams played a 144-game schedule, with the top team in each division in each half of the season qualifying for the post-season.

The Huntsville Stars won the Southern League championship, as they defeated the Charlotte Orioles in the playoffs.

== Team changes ==
- The Birmingham Barons ended their affiliation with the Detroit Tigers and began a new affiliation with the Chicago White Sox.

== Teams ==
1986 Southern League
Division	Team	City	MLB Affiliate	Stadium
East	Charlotte Orioles	Charlotte, North Carolina	Baltimore Orioles	Jim Crockett Memorial Park
East	Columbus Astros	Columbus, Georgia	Houston Astros	Golden Park
East	Greenville Braves	Greenville, South Carolina	Atlanta Braves	Greenville Municipal Stadium
East	Jacksonville Expos	Jacksonville, Florida	Montreal Expos	Wolfson Park
East	Orlando Twins	Orlando, Florida	Minnesota Twins	Tinker Field
West	Birmingham Barons	Birmingham, Alabama	Chicago White Sox	Rickwood Field
West	Chattanooga Lookouts	Chattanooga, Tennessee	Seattle Mariners	Engel Stadium
West	Huntsville Stars	Huntsville, Alabama	Oakland Athletics	Joe W. Davis Stadium
West	Knoxville Blue Jays	Knoxville, Tennessee	Toronto Blue Jays	Bill Meyer Stadium
West	Memphis Chicks	Memphis, Tennessee	Kansas City Royals	Tim McCarver Stadium

== Map of teams ==
East Division West Division

== Regular season ==
=== Summary ===
- The Huntsville Stars finished the season with the best record in the league for the first time in team history.

=== Standings ===
East Division
Team	Win	Loss	%	GB
Jacksonville Expos	75	68	.524	–
Greenville Braves	73	71	.507	2.5
Columbus Astros	70	70	.500	3.5
Charlotte Orioles	71	73	.493	4.5
Orlando Twins	70	73	.490	5
West Division
Huntsville Stars	78	63	.553	–
Knoxville Blue Jays	74	70	.514	5.5
Birmingham Barons	70	73	.490	9
Memphis Chicks	69	75	.479	10.5
Chattanooga Lookouts	64	78	.451	14.5

== League Leaders ==
=== Batting leaders ===
Stat	Player	Total
AVG	Brick Smith, Chattanooga Lookouts	.344
H	Gene Larkin, Orlando Twins; José Tolentino, Huntsville Stars	170
R	Gary Jones, Huntsville Stars	116
2B	Brick Smith, Chattanooga Lookouts	38
3B	Nelson Liriano, Knoxville Blue Jays	15
HR	Glenallen Hill, Knoxville Blue Jays	31
RBI	Terry Steinbach, Huntsville Stars	132
SB	Gerald Young, Columbus Astros	54

=== Pitching leaders ===
Stat	Player	Total
W	Anthony Kelley, Columbus Astros	14
ERA	Eric Bell, Charlotte Orioles	3.05
CG	Anthony Kelley, Columbus Astros	8
SHO	Todd Burns, Huntsville Stars; Mark Clemons, Orlando Twins; Anthony Kelley, Columbus Astros	3
SV	Paul Schneider, Chattanooga Lookouts	24
IP	Cliff Young, Knoxville Blue Jays	203.2
SO	Terry Taylor, Chattanooga Lookouts	164

== Playoffs ==
- The Columbus Astros won their first Southern League championship, defeating the Huntsville Stars in four games.

=== Playoff bracket ===
Division finals
E1	Jacksonville	1
E2	Columbus	3
W1	Huntsville	3
W2	Knoxville	1

Finals
E2	Columbus	3
W1	Huntsville	1

== Awards ==
Southern League awards
Award name	Recipient
Most Valuable Player	Terry Steinbach, Huntsville Stars
Pitcher of the Year	Anthony Kelley, Columbus Astros
Manager of the Year	Gary Tuck, Columbus Astros

== See also ==
- 1986 Major League Baseball season
