= 1989 Southern League season =

- League: Southern League
- Sport: Baseball
- Duration: April 7 – August 31
- Number of games: 144
- Number of teams: 10

Regular season
- League champions: Birmingham Barons
- Season MVP: Eric Anthony, Columbus Mudcats

Playoffs
- League champions: Birmingham Barons
- Runners-up: Greenville Braves

SL seasons
- ← 1988 1990 →

The 1989 Southern League was a Class AA baseball season played between April 7 and August 31. Ten teams played a 144-game schedule, with the top team in each division in each half of the season qualifying for the post-season.

The Birmingham Barons won the Southern League championship, as they defeated the Greenville Braves in the playoffs.

== Team changes ==
- The Columbus Astros are renamed to the Columbus Mudcats. The club remained affiliated with the Houston Astros.
- The Charlotte Knights ended their affiliation with the Baltimore Orioles and began a new affiliation with the Chicago Cubs.

== Teams ==
1989 Southern League
Division	Team	City	MLB Affiliate	Stadium
East	Charlotte Knights	Charlotte, North Carolina	Chicago Cubs	Knights Castle
East	Columbus Mudcats	Columbus, Georgia	Houston Astros	Golden Park
East	Greenville Braves	Greenville, South Carolina	Atlanta Braves	Greenville Municipal Stadium
East	Jacksonville Expos	Jacksonville, Florida	Montreal Expos	Wolfson Park
East	Orlando Twins	Orlando, Florida	Minnesota Twins	Tinker Field
West	Birmingham Barons	Birmingham, Alabama	Chicago White Sox	Hoover Metropolitan Stadium
West	Chattanooga Lookouts	Chattanooga, Tennessee	Cincinnati Reds	Engel Stadium
West	Huntsville Stars	Huntsville, Alabama	Oakland Athletics	Joe W. Davis Stadium
West	Knoxville Blue Jays	Knoxville, Tennessee	Toronto Blue Jays	Bill Meyer Stadium
West	Memphis Chicks	Memphis, Tennessee	Kansas City Royals	Tim McCarver Stadium

== Map of teams ==
East Division West Division

== Regular season ==
=== Summary ===
- The Birmingham Barons finished the season with the best record in the league for the first time since 1983.

=== Standings ===
East Division
Team	Win	Loss	%	GB
Orlando Twins	79	65	.549	–
Greenville Braves	70	69	.504	6.5
Columbus Mudcats	71	72	.497	7.5
Charlotte Knights	70	73	.490	8.5
Jacksonville Expos	68	76	.472	11
West Division
Birmingham Barons	88	55	.615	–
Huntsville Stars	82	61	.573	6
Knoxville Blue Jays	67	76	.469	21
Chattanooga Lookouts	58	81	.417	28
Memphis Chicks	59	84	.413	29

== League Leaders ==
=== Batting leaders ===
Stat	Player	Total
AVG	Scott Leius, Orlando Twins	.303
H	Craig Grebeck, Birmingham Barons	153
R	Rich Amaral, Birmingham Barons	90
2B	Paul Sorrento, Orlando Twins	35
3B	Jerome Nelson, Chattanooga Lookouts	13
HR	Eric Anthony, Columbus Mudcats	28
RBI	Paul Sorrento, Orlando Twins	112
SB	C. L. Penigar, Birmingham Barons	64

=== Pitching leaders ===
Stat	Player	Total
W	Laddie Renfroe, Charlotte Knights	19
ERA	Pete Delkus, Orlando Twins	1.87
CG	Grady Hall, Birmingham Barons	9
SHO	Howard Farmer, Jacksonville Expos; Greg Kallevig, Charlotte Knights; Darryl Kile, Columbus Mudcats; Doug Linton, Knoxville Blue Jays; Dale Polley, Greenville Braves; Woody Williams, Knoxville Blue Jays; Ray Young, Huntsville Stars	2
SV	Joe Klink, Huntsville Stars	26
IP	Grady Hall, Birmingham Barons	190.2
SO	Shawn Boskie, Charlotte Knights	164

== Playoffs ==
- The Birmingham Barons won their fourth Southern League championship, defeating the Greenville Braves in three games.

=== Playoff bracket ===
Division finals
E1	Orlando	1
E2	Greenville	'3
W1	Birmingham	3
W2	Huntsville	1

Finals
E2	Greenville	0
W1	Birmingham	3

== Awards ==
Southern League awards
Award name	Recipient
Most Valuable Player	Eric Anthony, Columbus Mudcats
Pitcher of the Year	Laddie Renfroe, Charlotte Knights
Manager of the Year	Jeff Newman, Huntsville Stars

== See also ==
- 1989 Major League Baseball season
