= 1988 Southern League season =

- League: Southern League
- Sport: Baseball
- Duration: April 8 – August 31
- Number of games: 144
- Number of teams: 10

Regular season
- League champions: Greenville Braves
- Season MVP: Matt Winters, Memphis Chicks

Playoffs
- League champions: Chattanooga Lookouts
- Runners-up: Greenville Braves

SL seasons
- ← 1987 1989 →

The 1988 Southern League was a Class AA baseball season played between April 8 and August 31. Ten teams played a 144-game schedule, with the top team in each division in each half of the season qualifying for the post-season.

The Chattanooga Lookouts won the Southern League championship, as they defeated the Greenville Braves in the playoffs.

== Team changes ==
- The Charlotte Orioles are renamed to the Charlotte Knights. The club remained affiliated with the Baltimore Orioles.
- The Chattanooga Lookouts ended their affiliation with the Seattle Mariners and began a new affiliation with the Cincinnati Reds.

== Teams ==
1988 Southern League
Division	Team	City	MLB Affiliate	Stadium
East	Charlotte Knights	Charlotte, North Carolina	Baltimore Orioles	Knights Park
East	Columbus Astros	Columbus, Georgia	Houston Astros	Golden Park
East	Greenville Braves	Greenville, South Carolina	Atlanta Braves	Greenville Municipal Stadium
East	Jacksonville Expos	Jacksonville, Florida	Montreal Expos	Wolfson Park
East	Orlando Twins	Orlando, Florida	Minnesota Twins	Tinker Field
West	Birmingham Barons	Birmingham, Alabama	Chicago White Sox	Hoover Metropolitan Stadium
West	Chattanooga Lookouts	Chattanooga, Tennessee	Cincinnati Reds	Engel Stadium
West	Huntsville Stars	Huntsville, Alabama	Oakland Athletics	Joe W. Davis Stadium
West	Knoxville Blue Jays	Knoxville, Tennessee	Toronto Blue Jays	Bill Meyer Stadium
West	Memphis Chicks	Memphis, Tennessee	Kansas City Royals	Tim McCarver Stadium

== Map of teams ==
East Division West Division

== Regular season ==
=== Summary ===
- The Greenville Braves finished the season with the best record in the league for the first time since 1984.

=== Standings ===
East Division
Team	Win	Loss	%	GB
Greenville Braves	87	57	.604	–
Jacksonville Expos	69	73	.486	17
Columbus Astros	69	74	.483	17.5
Charlotte Knights	69	75	.479	18
Orlando Twins	66	75	.468	19.5
West Division
Chattanooga Lookouts	81	62	.566	–
Memphis Chicks	79	64	.552	2
Knoxville Blue Jays	75	69	.521	6.5
Birmingham Barons	62	82	.431	19.5
Huntsville Stars	59	85	.410	22.5

== League Leaders ==
=== Batting leaders ===
Stat	Player	Total
AVG	Butch Davis, Charlotte Knights	.301
H	Mark Lemke, Greenville Braves	153
R	Rafael Skeete, Charlotte Knights	89
2B	Kevin Burrell, Memphis Chicks	32
3B	Carlo Colombio, Columbus Astros; Jerry Holtz, Charlotte Knights; Barry Jones, Greenville Braves; Dennis Hood, Greenville Braves	8
HR	Matt Winters, Memphis Chicks	25
RBI	Matt Winters, Memphis Chicks	91
SB	Jeff Huson, Jacksonville Expos	56

=== Pitching leaders ===
Stat	Player	Total
W	Chris Hammond, Chattanooga Lookouts	16
ERA	Mark Gardner, Jacksonville Expos	1.60
CG	Gene Harris, Jacksonville Expos	7
SHO	Mark Clemons, Jacksonville Expos	3
SV	Germán González, Orlando Twins	31
IP	Steve Cummings, Knoxville Blue Jays	212.2
SO	Alex Sanchez, Knoxville Blue Jays	166

== Playoffs ==
- The Chattanooga Lookouts won their first Southern League championship, defeating the Greenville Braves in four games.

=== Playoff bracket ===
Division finals
E1	Greenville	3
E2	Jacksonville	2
W1	Chattanooga	3
W2	Memphis	1

Finals
E1	Greenville	1
W1	Chattanooga	3

== Awards ==
Southern League awards
Award name	Recipient
Most Valuable Player	Matt Winters, Memphis Chicks
Pitcher of the Year	Germán González, Orlando Twins
Manager of the Year	Buddy Bailey, Greenville Braves

== See also ==
- 1988 Major League Baseball season
