= Larry Luebbers =

American baseball player (born 1969)

- Pitcher
- Born: October 11, 1969 (age 55); Cincinnati, Ohio, U.S.
- Batted: Right Threw: Right

MLB debut
- July 3, 1993, for the Cincinnati Reds

Last MLB appearance
- September 26, 2000, for the Cincinnati Reds

MLB statistics
- Win–loss record: 5–10
- Earned run average: 4.96
- Strikeouts: 63
- Stats at Baseball Reference

Teams
- Cincinnati Reds (1993); St. Louis Cardinals (1999); Cincinnati Reds (2000)

Larry Christopher Luebbers (born October 11, 1969) is a former Major League Baseball player who played with the Cincinnati Reds and the St. Louis Cardinals. He made his major league debut on July 3, 1993, against the Pittsburgh Pirates and gave up 3 earned runs in 5 2/3 innings. After the 1993 season he was traded by the Reds with Mike Anderson and Darron Cox to the Chicago Cubs for Chuck McElroy. From there Luebbers bounced around minor league organizations until 1999 when he reemerged in the majors for the Cardinals. The next year he pitched his last games in the majors for the Reds.
