= Jim Bowie (baseball) =

American baseball player (born 1965)

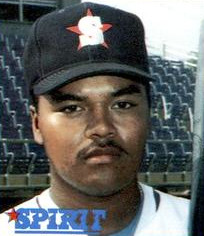
- Bowie in 1988
- First baseman
- Born: February 17, 1965 (age 61); Tokyo, Japan
- Batted: Left Threw: Left

MLB debut
- August 3, 1994, for the Oakland Athletics

Last MLB appearance
- August 11, 1994, for the Oakland Athletics

MLB statistics
- Batting average: .214
- Home runs: 0
- Runs batted in: 0
- Stats at Baseball Reference

Teams
- Oakland Athletics (1994)

James R. Bowie (born February 17, 1965) is a Japanese-American former professional baseball first baseman. He played for the Oakland Athletics during the 1994 season.

Bowie was born in Tokyo to Willard and Taiko Bowie. His father married his mother, a Japanese native, while serving in Japan in the United States Air Force.

Bowie attended Armijo High School in Fairfield, California before playing college baseball at Sacramento City College and for the LSU Tigers. In 2012, he became the first athlete to have his uniform number retired by Armijo High.
