= Mike Anderson (pitcher) =

American baseball player (born 1966)

- Pitcher
- Born: July 30, 1966 (age 60); Austin, Texas, U.S.
- Batted: Right Threw: Right

MLB debut
- September 7, 1993, for the Cincinnati Reds

Last MLB appearance
- September 17, 1993, for the Cincinnati Reds

MLB statistics
- Win–loss record: 0–0
- Earned run average: 18.56
- Strikeouts: 4

KBO statistics
- Win–loss record: 6–16
- Earned run average: 5.33
- Strikeouts: 61
- Stats at Baseball Reference

Teams
- Cincinnati Reds (1993); LG Twins (1998); Ssangbangwool Raiders (1999)

Michael James Anderson (born July 30, 1966) is an American former Major League Baseball player who pitched for the Cincinnati Reds in 1993. He made his major league debut on September 7 against the St. Louis Cardinals. He pitched 1 2/3 of an inning, allowed 6 hits, 7 earned runs, and gave up 2 of 4 home runs in a single game hit by Mark Whiten. He only appeared in two more games after that. On December 10, 1993, he was traded with Darron Cox and Larry Luebbers to the Chicago Cubs for Chuck McElroy but he never made it to the majors with the Cubs. He continued to pitch in the minors until 1997, when he headed to Korea. In 1998, Anderson recorded a save in Game 3 of the 1998 Korean Series for the LG Twins, becoming the first American-born hurler to accomplish this feat.

After serving as a pitching coach in the Chicago Cubs' farm system from 2000 to 2006, he became a scout at the pro level for the Texas Rangers. His younger brother is current Milwaukee Brewers TV play-by-play announcer Brian Anderson.
