= Port City Roosters =

- 1995–1996; Wilmington, North Carolina

Minor league affiliations
- Class: Double-A (1995–1996)
- League: Southern League (1995–1996)

Major league affiliations
- Team: Seattle Mariners (1995–1996)

Team data
- Name: Port City Roosters (1995–1996)
- Colors: Purple, green, red, white
- Ballpark: Brooks Field (1995–1996)

The Port City Roosters were a Minor League Baseball team of the Southern League and the Double-A affiliate of the Seattle Mariners from 1995 to 1996. They were located in Wilmington, North Carolina, and played their home games at Brooks Field on the campus of the University of North Carolina Wilmington. The team's moniker came from the combination of the city's tradition of being called the Port City, owing to it being the state's largest seaport, and for the team's arrival being heralded as an awaking to professional baseball as well as for the uniqueness of the name—no other team was known as the Roosters.

== History ==
The Roosters were designed to play in Wilmington only on an interim basis for two seasons. After the 1992 baseball season, Charlotte, North Carolina, home of the Southern League's Charlotte Knights, acquired a Triple-A expansion team in the International League, leaving the Southern League franchise in need of a new home. The team temporarily moved to Nashville, Tennessee for the 1993 and 1994 seasons, becoming the Nashville Xpress. The Xpress played at Herschel Greer Stadium, home of the Nashville Sounds, for two seasons while the team sought a permanent location. In order to accommodate a second team at Greer Stadium, the Xpress' home games were scheduled during the Sounds' road trips and vice versa.

In January 1995, the team's owner, Dennis Bastien, arrived at terms to move the franchise to Springfield, Missouri, where they would play in a new stadium scheduled to open in 1997. In the intervening two seasons, the franchise would play in Wilmington. The Roosters were operated by Steve Bryant, owner of the Carolina Mudcats.

The team never made it to Springfield after the city was unable to secure federal funding for a ballpark. Bastien made an attempt to place the team in the Springfield suburb of Ozark, but residents voted down a sales tax increase to pay for a stadium. He subsequently sold the forlorn franchise to sports investor Eric Margenau, who moved the team to Mobile, Alabama, where they began play at Hank Aaron Stadium as the Mobile BayBears in 1997.

== 1995 season ==
In 1995, the Roosters finished with an overall record of 62–80, finishing fourth in the five-team East Division. During their first season, 110,233 people attended Roosters games.

== 1996 season ==
The 1996 squad finished with an overall record of 56–84, finishing last in their division. During their second and final season, the Roosters drew 68,463 fans.

== Radio ==
The Roosters' games were broadcast locally on WAAV 980. David Kelly and Mike Ferreri did the play-by-play.

== Players ==
Among the better-known future major leaguers who wore the Roosters' uniform were catcher Jason Varitek, pitchers Derek Lowe and Ryan Franklin, shortstop Desi Relaford, and outfielders José Cruz Jr. and Raúl Ibañez.
