= Huntsville Stars =

- 1985–2014; Huntsville, Alabama
Team logo
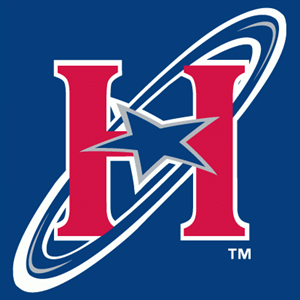
Cap insignia

Minor league affiliations
- Class: Double-A
- League: Southern League

Major league affiliations
- Team: Milwaukee Brewers (1999–2014); Oakland Athletics (1985–1998)

Minor league titles
- League titles (3): 1985; 1994; 2001
- Division titles (8): 1985; 1986; 1994; 1997; 2001; 2003; 2006; 2007
- First-half titles (8): 1985; 1986; 1994; 2001; 2003; 2007; 2009; 2014
- Second-half titles (5): 1987; 1989; 1997; 2006; 2007

Team data
- Name: Huntsville Stars
- Colors: Blue, red, gray, white
- Mascot: Homer the Polecat (1995–2014)
- Ballpark: Joe W. Davis Stadium

The Huntsville Stars were a Minor League Baseball team that played in Huntsville, Alabama, from 1985 to 2014. They competed in the Southern League as the Double-A affiliate of Major League Baseball's Oakland Athletics from 1985 to 1998 and Milwaukee Brewers from 1999 to 2014. The Stars played their home games at Joe W. Davis Stadium and were named for the space industry with which Huntsville is economically tied (NASA conducts operations at the nearby Marshall Space Flight Center).

The team began play in 1985 after a Southern League franchise operating in Nashville, Tennessee, as the Nashville Sounds, was transferred to Huntsville. They remained in the city for 30 years before being relocated to Biloxi, Mississippi, where they became known as the Biloxi Shuckers, after the 2014 season.

Over the course of playing in 4,211 regular season games and compiling a win–loss record of 2,112–2,099, Huntsville reached the postseason on 14 occasions, winning 13 half-season titles, 10 division titles, and 3 Southern League championships. They won their first league championship in their inaugural 1985 season as an affiliate of the Oakland Athletics. They won a second with Oakland in 1994 and a third in 2001 with the Milwaukee Brewers.

== History ==
=== Coming to Huntsville ===
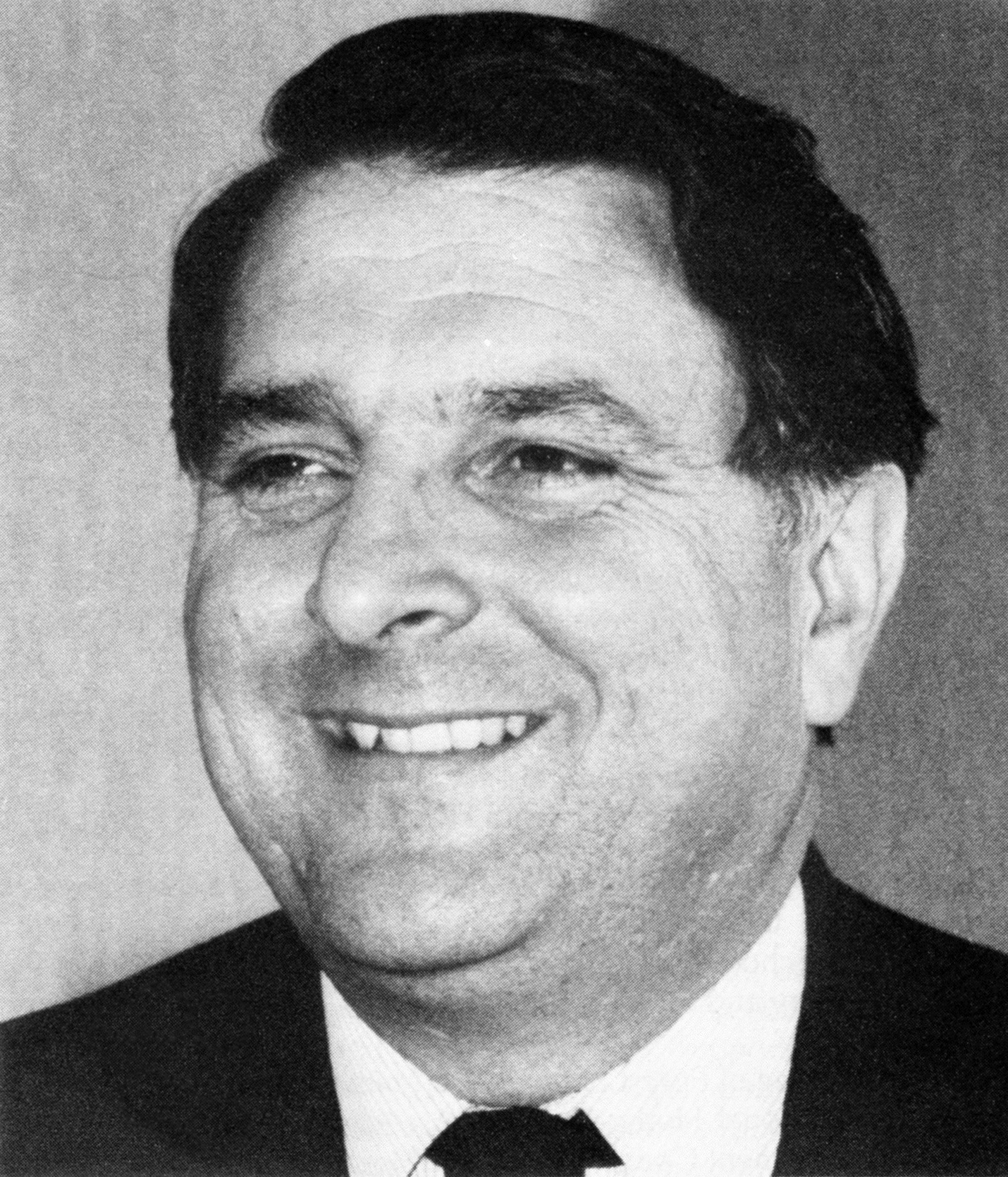
Larry Schmittou moved his Southern League franchise from Nashville to Huntsville, becoming the Stars in 1985.

In July 1984, Larry Schmittou, president of the Nashville Sounds of the Double-A Southern League, and other members of the team's ownership group purchased the Evansville Triplets of the Triple-A American Association with plans to move the franchise from Evansville, Indiana, to Nashville for the 1985 season. The Southern League wanted Schmittou to surrender his franchise to the league, but he had plans to relocate the team instead. He wanted to send Nashville's existing Southern League franchise to Evansville to continue as the Triplets at Double-A. However, a combination of the league's disapproval of the move and the City of Evansville being unwilling to upgrade Bosse Field resulted in a move to Huntsville, Alabama. The city, led by Mayor Joe W. Davis, agreed to build a brand new 10,000-seat multipurpose stadium which lured the franchise to town where it began play in 1985 as the Huntsville Stars. The Triple-A Sounds carried on the history of the Double-A team that preceded it, while the Stars were established as an entirely new franchise. Schmittou and several other Sounds shareholders owned the Stars, while Don Mincher, a Huntsville native and 12-year veteran of the major leagues, operated the team as its General Manager.

=== Oakland Athletics (1985–1998) ===
The Huntsville Stars became the Double-A affiliate of the Oakland Athletics. Manager Brad Fischer guided the franchise to win the First Half Western Division title in their inaugural season. They then defeated the Knoxville Blue Jays, 3–1, in the Western Division finals on the way to winning their first Southern League championship in their first season by defeating the Charlotte O's, 3–2. Outfielder Jose Canseco was selected as the Southern League Most Valuable Player (MVP).

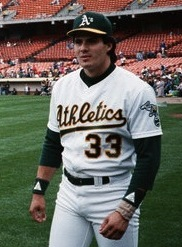
Outfielder Jose Canseco won the 1985 Southern League MVP Award.

In 1986, the Stars hosted the Southern League All-Star Game at Joe W. Davis Stadium on July 23. A team of Southern League All-Stars was defeated by the Nashville Sounds, 4–2. Huntsville catcher Terry Steinbach won the game's MVP Award. The 1986 Stars repeated with another first half title and won the Western Division against the Knoxville Blue Jays, 3–1. They were defeated in the finals, however, by the Columbus Astros, 3–1. Steinbach won the league's MVP Award. In 1987, they reached the postseason for the third consecutive season by winning the second half of the season, but fell to the Birmingham Barons, 3–0, in the Western Division finals. The 1988 club finished with a 59–85 (.410) record, the lowest in franchise history.

The 1989 Stars returned to the playoffs having won the second half, but were again defeated by Birmingham in the division finals, 3–1. Manager Jeff Newman was selected for the Southern League Manager of the Year Award. The team missed the postseason in both 1990 and 1991. In 1991, Huntsville hosted the first Double-A All-Star Game on July 10. A team of American League-affiliated All-Stars defeated a team of National League-affiliated All-Stars, 8–2. On August 3, 1992, pitchers Dana Allison, Roger Smithberg, and Todd Revering combined to pitch a 10-inning, 1–0 no-hitter against Birmingham. The Chattanooga Lookouts won both halves of the 1992 season, but Huntsville qualified for the postseason with the second-best overall record in the Western Division. They were defeated by the Lookouts, 3–1, in the division series. First baseman Marcos Armas was the MVP of 1992's Double-A All-Star Game. On June 13, 1993, Tanyon Sturtze no-hit Chattanooga, 5–0.

Following the 1993 season, Larry Schmittou sold the Stars to Don Mincher and a group of Huntsville investors for an asking price between US$3.5 million and $4 million. After missing the playoffs in 1993, the Stars won the 1994 first half and then defeated Chattanooga for the Western Division title, 3–1. Huntsville won its second Southern League championship, 3–1, against the Carolina Mudcats. Manager of the Year Gary Jones' 1994 club set a franchise record with their 81–57 (.587) season.

The Stars did not return to the postseason until 1997. They won the second half before beating the Mobile BayBears, 3–2, to win the Western Division before ultimately losing the championship to the Greenville Braves, 3–2. Right fielder Ben Grieve was the league MVP, and shortstop Mike Coolbaugh won MVP honors at that summer's Double-A All-Star Game. The 1998 team qualified for the playoffs with the second-best record behind Mobile, which had won both halves, but was swept, 3–0, by the BayBears in the Western Division finals.

After the 1998 season, the Huntsville Stars terminated their affiliation with the Oakland Athletics. Through 14 years with the Athletics, the Stars had amassed a record of 1,029–961 (.517).

=== Milwaukee Brewers (1999–2014) ===
After the Stars and Athletics parted ways, Huntsville became the Double-A affiliate of the Milwaukee Brewers. The Stars struggled in their first two seasons of the new affiliation, failing to win any half of the seasons.

In 2000, Mincher became Interim President of the Southern League when President Arnold Fielkow left for the National Football League. At the conclusion of the 2000 season, Mincher and his group put the Stars up for sale once again. He resigned from his position as President of the Stars, and the Southern League removed the "interim" tag to make him league president for 2001. Pulling double duty until the team was sold, Mincher desired to keep the Stars in Huntsville. The group waded through countless offers to buy the Stars looking to find the right investors who would commit to keeping the team in the Tennessee Valley. Early in 2001, Mincher found his man in New York attorney Miles Prentice who also owned the Midland RockHounds, served as a Director for the Texas League, and was the Chairman of the Board of Trustees for Minor League Baseball. Prentice promised to keep the team in Huntsville despite several offers for new stadiums in various locales.

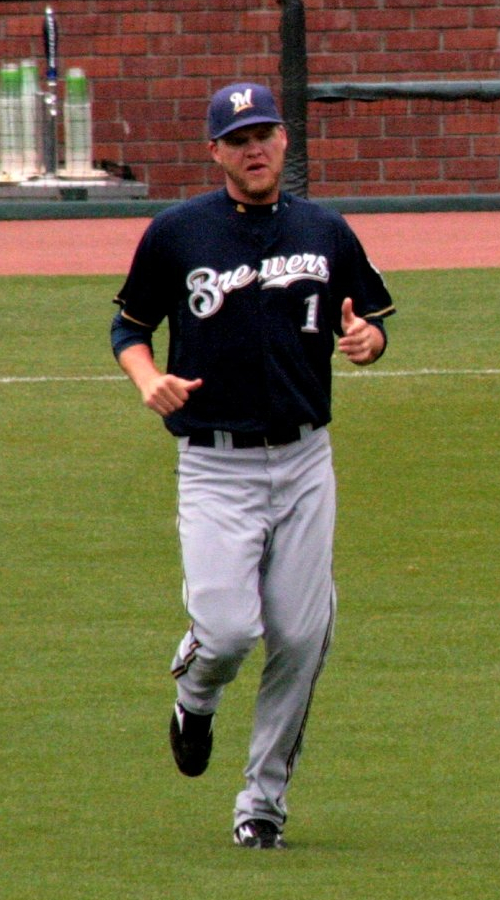
Third baseman Corey Hart won the 2003 Southern League MVP Award.

The Stars returned to the playoffs in 2001. Winning the First Half Western Division title, the team went on to win the division against Birmingham, 3–2. The September 11 attacks prompted the cancellation of the championship series before it could begin. Both Huntsville and the Eastern Division champion Jacksonville Suns were declared co-champions. Third baseman Dave Gibralter won the MVP Award for that summer's Double-A All-Star Game.

In 2003, the first-half champion Stars won the Western Division versus Birmingham, 3–2, but lost in the Southern League championship series to Carolina, 3–2. Third baseman Corey Hart won the Southern League MVP Award, and manager Frank Kremblas was the league's Manager of the Year. Missing the playoffs in 2004 and 2005, they made another championship attempt in 2006, winning the second half, defeating Chattanooga, 3–0, for the Northern Division title, but losing the league crown to the Montgomery Biscuits, 3–1. In 2007, Stars manager Don Money was named the Southern League's Manager of the Year. Also in 2007, the team captured the division title, beating the Tennessee Smokies, 3–2, but were again defeated by Montgomery in the finals, 3–2.

To start the 2008 season, the Stars set a new team record for best start, by sweeping their first series with the Mississippi Braves, 5–0. On April 26, 2008, the Stars turned their second triple play in franchise history, the last coming in 2002. David Welch pitched a 7-inning no-hitter against Chattanooga on June 2, 2008. The Stars won the 2009 first half title but lost the Northern Division to Tennessee, 3–1. Sub-.500 teams from 2010 to 2013 failed to reach the playoffs, the longest postseason drought in team history. During this stretch, however, Wily Peralta won the 2011 Southern League Most Outstanding Pitcher Award and first baseman Hunter Morris won the 2012 MVP Award. On August 2, 2012, Jimmy Nelson, Dan Merklinger, R. J. Seidel, Darren Byrd, and Brandon Kintzler pitched a combined no-hitter against Chattanooga, a 3–1 win. Merklinger walked four batters in the fifth inning for the only Lookouts run of the game.

Prior to the 2014 season, an ownership group based in Biloxi, Mississippi, led by Ken Young purchased the team with the intention of relocating the club. The Stars played the 2014 season in Huntsville, while a new ballpark was built in Biloxi. In their 30th and final season in Huntsville, the Stars won the first half title, but lost in the Northern Division series to Chattanooga, 3–2. Over 16 years as a Brewers affiliate, Huntsville compiled a record of 1,083–1,138 (.488). The franchise's composite record over their entire 30-year run stood at 2,112–2,099 (.502).

Because of delays in the construction of Biloxi's MGM Park, the Biloxi Shuckers, as the team was named, played their first 54 games on the road, including 15 at Joe Davis Stadium in April and May 2015 before their June 6 home opener in Biloxi.

== Season-by-season results ==
Huntsville Stars' top 10 seasons by winning percentage
Season	Regular-season					Postseason			MLB affiliate	Ref.
Season	Record	Win %	League	Division	GB	Record	Win %	Result	MLB affiliate	Ref.
1994	81–57	.587	1st	1st	—	6–1	.857	Won First-Half Western Division title Won Western Division title vs. Chattanooga Lookouts, 3–0; Won SL championship vs. Carolina Mudcats, 3–1	Oakland Athletics	
1989	82–61	.573	2nd	2nd	6	1–3	.250	Won Second-Half Western Division title Lost Western Division title vs. Birmingham Barons, 3–1	Oakland Athletics	
1992	81–63	.563	3rd	2nd	9 1/2	1–3	.250	Lost Western Division title vs. Chattanooga Lookouts, 3–1	Oakland Athletics	
1997	77–62	.554	1st	1st	—	5–5	.500	Won Second-Half Western Division title Won Western Division title vs. Mobile BayBears, 3–2; Lost SL championship vs. Greenville Braves, 3–2	Oakland Athletics	
1986	78–63	.553	1st	1st	—	5–3	.625	Won First-Half Western Division title Won Western Division title vs. Knoxville Blue Jays, 3–1; Lost SL championship vs. Columbus Astros, 3–1	Oakland Athletics	
2014	77–63	.550	4th	1st	—	2–3	.400	Won First-Half Northern Division title Lost Northern Division title vs. Chattanooga Lookouts, 3–2	Milwaukee Brewers	
1990	79–65	.549	3rd	1st	—	—	—	—	Oakland Athletics	
2007	75–62	.547	3rd	1st	—	5–5	.500	Won First and Second-Half Northern Division titles Won Northern Division title vs. Tennessee Smokies, 3–2; Lost SL championship vs. Montgomery Biscuits, 3–2	Milwaukee Brewers	
2001	75–63	.543	4th	3rd	4	3–2	.600	Won First-Half Western Division title Won Western Division title vs. Birmingham Barons, 3–2; Won SL co-championship vs. Jacksonville Suns	Milwaukee Brewers	
2003	75–63	.543	2nd	1st	—	5–5	.500	Won First-Half Western Division title Won Western Division title vs. Birmingham Barons, 3–2; Lost SL championship vs. Carolina Mudcats, 3–2	Milwaukee Brewers	

== Ballpark ==
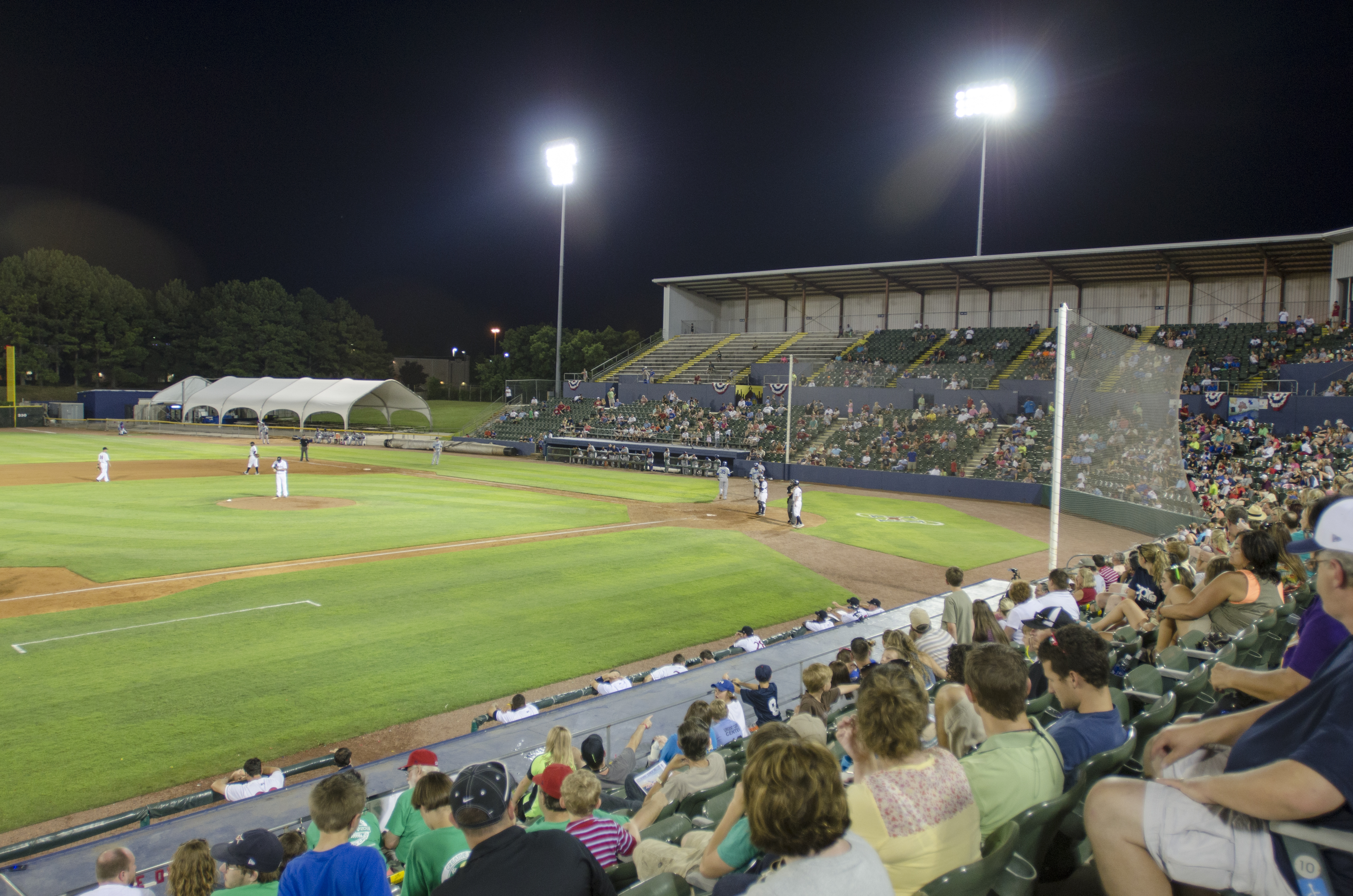
Joe W. Davis Stadium in 2013

For the entirety of their 30-year history in Huntsville, the Stars played at Joe W. Davis Stadium. The ballpark, which opened in 1985, had a seating capacity of 10,200 in 2010 and 13 skyboxes.

Following its final baseball games in 2015, the ballpark sat vacant and abandoned until it was converted into a soccer-specific stadium for Huntsville City FC in 2023.

== Achievements ==
=== Retired numbers ===
The Stars honored one individual by retiring their uniform number. This ensured that the number would be associated with one person of particular importance to the team. Don Mincher, Huntsville's general manager from 1985 to 2001 and part owner from 1994 to 2001, had the number 5, which he wore during his major league playing career, retired on June 6, 2008. An additional number, 42, was retired throughout professional baseball in 1997 to honor Jackie Robinson, the first African American to play in Major League Baseball in the modern era.

Retired numbers
The number "5" within a blue and red circle	The number "42" within a blue and red circle
Don Mincher	Jackie Robinson
GM / Owner; 1985–2001 / 1994–2001; Retired June 6, 2008	Retired throughout professional baseball on April 15, 1997

=== Hall of Famers ===
Five people associated with the Stars have been inducted in the Southern League Hall of Fame. Don Mincher, general manager from 1985 to 2001 and part owner from 1994 to 2001, and Rosemary Hovatter, administrative assistant and box office employee from 1985 to 2014, were inducted in the inaugural Hall of Fame Class in 2014. Second baseman/shortstop Scott Brosius, inducted in 2015, played for the Stars in 1989 and 1990, and led the Southern League in his second season with 162 hits, 274 total bases, and 39 doubles, earning him a spot on the 1990 postseason all-star team. He went on to an 11-year MLB career, winning three World Series and the 1998 World Series MVP Award with the New York Yankees. Larry Schmittou, who helped bring baseball to Huntsville in 1985 and was part owner of the Stars from 1985 to 1993, was inducted in 2016. Broadcaster Curt Bloom, the team's Director of Broadcasting in 1991, was inducted in 2018.

== Notable former players ==
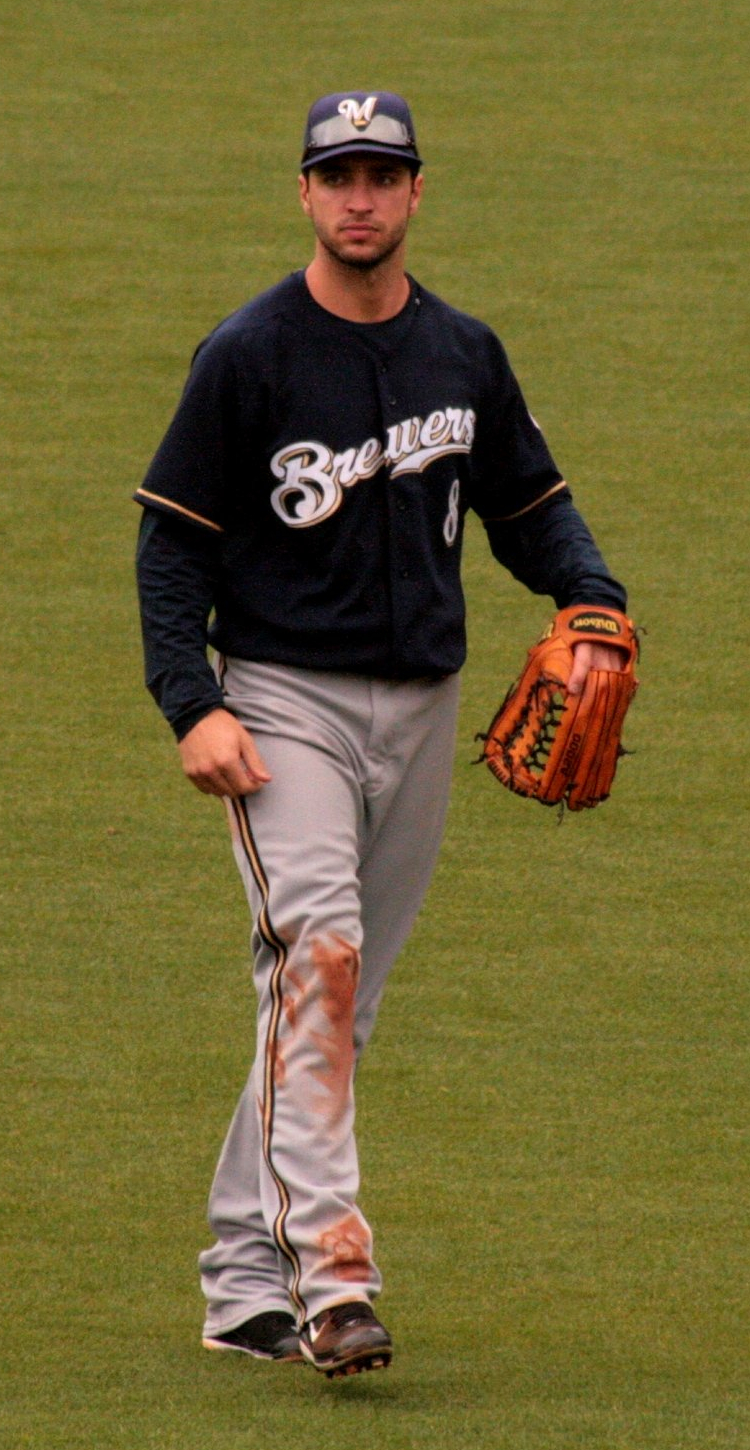
Ryan Braun

- John Axford
- Tim Belcher
- Mike Bordick
- Michael Brantley
- Ryan Braun
- Scott Brosius
- Greg Cadaret
- Lorenzo Cain
- José Canseco
- Ozzie Canseco
- Eric Chavez
- Nelson Cruz
- Alcides Escobar
- Prince Fielder
- Yovani Gallardo
- Jason Giambi
- Ben Grieve
- Tony Gwynn Jr.
- Bill Hall
- Mitch Haniger
- J. J. Hardy
- Corey Hart
- Ramón Hernández
- Tim Hudson
- Stan Javier
- Darren Lewis
- Jonathan Lucroy
- Mark McGwire
- Brad Nelson
- Charlie O'Brien
- Manny Parra
- Wily Peralta
- Luis Polonia
- Jean Segura
- Ben Sheets
- Terry Steinbach
- Adam Stern
- Miguel Tejada
- Todd Van Poppel
- Carlos Villanueva
- Rickie Weeks
- Walt Weiss
- Wally Whitehurst
- Steve Woodard
