= Engel Stadium =

Stadium in Chattanooga, Tennessee, US

- The Joe
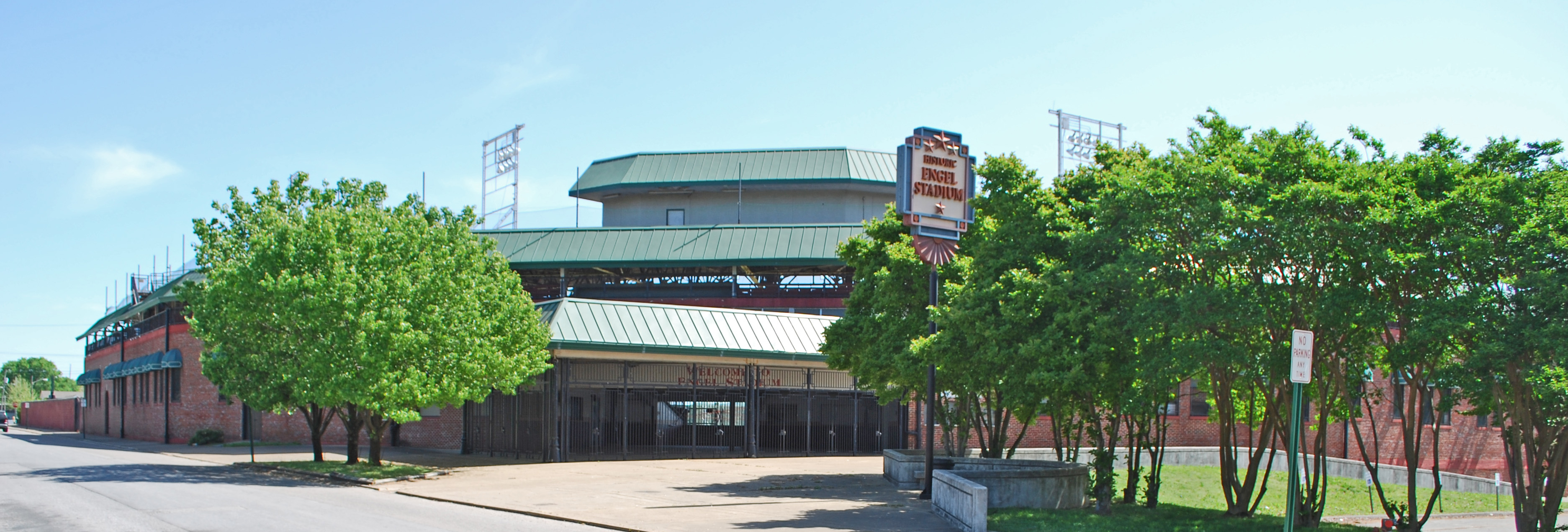
- Interactive map of Engel Stadium
- Location: 1130 East Third Street; Chattanooga, Tennessee; 37403
- Coordinates: 35.04544°N 85.28628°W
- Owner: University of Tennessee at Chattanooga
- Operator: The Engel Foundation
- Capacity: 12,000 (1930); 7,500 (1989); 5,997 (2000)
- Surface: Natural Grass
- Field size: Left Field – 325 feet (99 m); Center Field – 471 feet (144 m); Right Field – 318 feet (97 m)

Construction
- Groundbreaking: 1929
- Opened: 1930
- Renovated: 1988
- Cost: $150,000
- Architect: James G. Gauntt
- Main contractors: Rogers & Leventhal

Tenants
- Chattanooga Lookouts, SL/SAL/SA (1930–1965, 1976–1999); Chattanooga Choo-Choos, NSL (1945–1946); Tennessee Temple University, NAIA (2000–2010); Howard High School, TSSAA (2010)
- Engel Stadium
- U.S. National Register of Historic Places
- Coordinates: 35.04544°N 85.28628°W
- Area: 6 acres (2 ha)
- Built: 1930
- NRHP reference No.: 09000954
- Added to NRHP: November 19, 2009

Engel Stadium is a stadium in Chattanooga, Tennessee. The stadium was built in 1930 and holds 12,000 people. It was the home of the Chattanooga Lookouts until 1999 when they moved to their next stadium, AT&T Field. The former Tennessee Temple University held its home games at Engel after the Lookouts left. Engel Stadium was named for longtime President of the Chattanooga Lookouts, Joe Engel.

The ballpark is located at 1130 E. 3rd Street, adjacent to the historic Fort Wood neighborhood, Norfolk Southern's DeButts Yard, and Erlanger Hospital. 3rd Street runs behind left field. The other boundaries are O'Neal Street (west, third base); East 5th Street / Engel Drive (south, first base); and railroad tracks (east, right field)

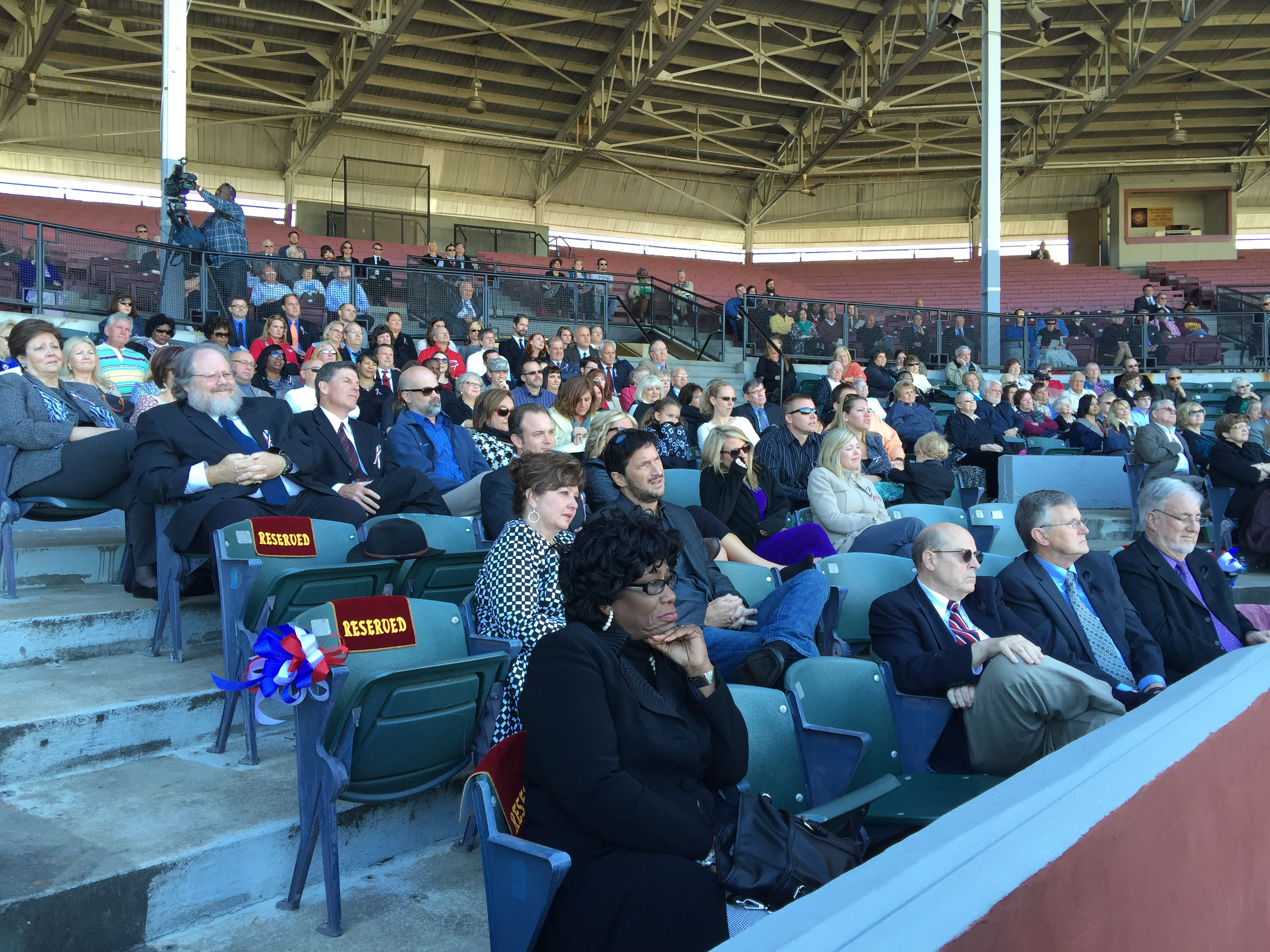
People attend an event at Engel Stadium in Chattanooga in 2014

== History ==
In 1929, Clark Griffith, owner of the Washington Senators sent a young scout by the name of Joe Engel to the South to find a home for the club's first minor league affiliate. First, Engel went to Atlanta with cash in hand to buy the Atlanta Crackers, but for reasons unknown he backed out and came north to Chattanooga, Tennessee. Engel not only bought the Chattanooga Lookouts from Sammy Strang, but also replaced their ballpark, Andrews Field with a state-of-the-art stadium at a cost of $150,000.

Andrews Field had been the team's home since 1910. (In 1909, they played their games at Chamberlain Field.) The field opened on April 18, 1910. It was named for Oliver Burnside Andrews (1882–1937), a local businessman who was president and founder of the ball club. Andrews Field was on the same block as Engel Stadium, with home plate at the northwest corner. The original stands utilized the upslope to 3rd Street as support. Engel relocated home plate to the southwest corner and built a new, permanent grandstand. The rebuilding effort was sufficiently completed to allow the new facility to open for exhibition play on March 23, 1930. The regular season opener was April 15, 1930.

The old grandstand was initially retained, with some remodeling to make it more suitable as a bleacher section. It was used for knothole gangs and also for segregated seating. In the off-season of 1935-1936, a large scoreboard was built in left-center, and much of the original grandstand was removed. This resulted in a spacious outfield, especially the far corner to the left of straightaway center field, which was posted as 471 feet (144 m). The gradual rise to Third Street along the left field wall, where the original stands had been, was then exposed, and became a "terrace" or hill which made up the difference in grade between the field and the street. The terrace contained the word "LOOKOUTS" in large letters. Harmon Killebrew is said to be the only man to hit a ball over the deepest part of the outfield.

In that same off-season, lights were installed at the ballpark. The first night game there was played on April 21, 1936. Knoxville spoiled the occasion by defeating Chattanooga 3-2.

The ballpark had a near-miss with disaster on May 13, 1942, when a fire broke out overnight, somewhere around the left field corner. The remaining wooden bleachers and part of the fence were destroyed before the fire was put out. Some of the lights were also damaged in the blaze. Repairs were made and the season continued.

Many of Joe Engel's famous antics also took place at Engel Stadium, gaining him the nickname, "The Barnum of Baseball." In 1931, the New York Yankees played an exhibition game at Engel Stadium against the Lookouts. During the game, a 17-year-old girl named Jackie Mitchell pitched for the Lookouts, striking out Major League greats Lou Gehrig and Babe Ruth. In 1936, a record crowd of 24,624 fans crammed into the park that only held 12,000 seats for the chance of winning a house in the middle of the Great Depression. The winning ticket was not at the game. On Opening Day in 1938, Joe Engel debuted his popular "Wild Elephant Hunt" prior to the game. It was such a success, he took it to ballparks throughout the South.

Many notables have played on the field, including Babe Ruth, Lou Gehrig, Hank Aaron, Satchel Paige, Willie Mays, Harmon Killebrew, Ferguson Jenkins, Kiki Cuyler, and Rogers Hornsby.

When the Lookouts could not find an affiliate from 1966 to 1975, the Stadium began to deteriorate. Despite amateur games being played at Engel day and night all summer long, it was not being properly maintained. In 1972, Chattanooga News Free Press columnist Allan Morris wrote that "paint is peeling off the walls, the floor is filthy, the roof is falling down, and it looks like a tornado hit the place." When Woody Reid bought the club in 1976 and gained a Major League affiliate in the Oakland Athletics, he hosted "Sparkle Days" at the stadium, where fans volunteered their time to fixing up Engel.

In the winter of 1988, Engel Stadium underwent its first major renovation. The $2 million project called for a new look to the exterior of the stadium, a two-story front office building built down the first base line, a new press box on top of the roof, a restaurant in the concourse with a view of the field, and a resurfaced field. "We were trying to do things in a real haphazard way", said Lookouts General Manager Bill Lee. The renovation resulted in a half-million dollar lawsuit by the Lookouts against the city and county for installing a field that did not drain properly.

In the winter of 1994, Frank Burke bought the Lookouts. Years later he would say, "Finding Engel Stadium was a bit like falling in love: initially, you don't see some of the downsides." The downside was that Engel Stadium was becoming so costly to keep up that he could not turn a profit. By 1998, the situation got so severe that Burke agreed to fund a new ballpark on top of Hawk Hill, so long as he could sell 1,800 season tickets and 10 luxury boxes for his new park by February 4, 1999. Burke met his goal a week early and the Lookouts played their last game at Engel Stadium on September 10, 1999.

In 2000, Hamilton County and the city of Chattanooga assumed joint ownership of Engel Stadium. It was subsequently leased to Tennessee Temple University for use as their baseball team's home field. The field was modified, with a fence running across the left and center fields to reduce the dimensions of the playing field. The terrace still exists, beyond the inner fence, and covered with grass, the "LOOKOUTS" having been removed.

In 2008, UT Chattanooga acquired the property. The University will build a state-of-the-art track and field complex in the current parking lot and partner with the Engel Foundation in the restoration of the Stadium. On April 5, 2011 the City of Chattanooga passed an interim agreement allowing UTC to take control of the Stadium, pending final approval of the state government. Vice Chancellor Richard Brown announced plans to work with The Engel Foundation to restore the Stadium, which was damaged during a tornado in April 2011.

In 2012, Engel Stadium was used as the movie set for the motion picture 42, the life story of Jackie Robinson. Much of the entire film's baseball action was shot at Engel Stadium, which also doubled for Brooklyn's Ebbetts Field. On July 18, 2012 crews began demolition to restore the ballpark back to its historical accuracy after construction was done for the movie that altered the ballpark, including moving the location of the ball fields.

In October 2025, Brent Goldberg, vice chancellor for finance and administration at UTC announced that the historic ballpark will be torn down, to be replaced by a women's athletic complex. In an interview, he said, "The stadium, we've looked at it, it's not salvageable to renovate it." UTC announced a seven-figure contribution from the Steiner family in March to go toward a women's sports complex. A monument will be built to memorialize Engel Stadium.

== The Engel Foundation ==
In April 2009, The Engel Foundation was formed to restore, preserve, promote, and revitalize Engel Stadium. "It is just kind of sitting there", said Foundation director Janna Jahn. "It is not getting the maintenance it needs. It is not being promoted." In its short existence, the Foundation has hosted a Great Spaces Open House at the Stadium that was attended by over a hundred people, two Legends Baseball Camps led by former major leaguers Steve Trout, Rick Honeycutt, Willie Wilson, and Jay Johnstone, and on December 14, 2009, Engel Stadium was approved as a site on the National Register of Historic Places.

The Engel Foundation plans to raise $150,000 in needed repairs. Once that is accomplished, the Foundation wants to promote Engel as a destination for events from Little League Baseball, to middle/ high school baseball to adult league baseball. The venue could also serve as a museum to Chattanooga baseball, a site for concerts, and other community events.

In May 2013 the Foundation announced that the stadium would be renovated and ready to hold baseball games by the 2014 season. The foundation released a statement claiming that $200,000 will be necessary to complete the renovations.

== Gallery ==
Andrews Field in 1910

Artist's conception of Engels Stadium in 1930
