= Tinker Field =

Baseball stadium in Orlando, Florida, U.S.

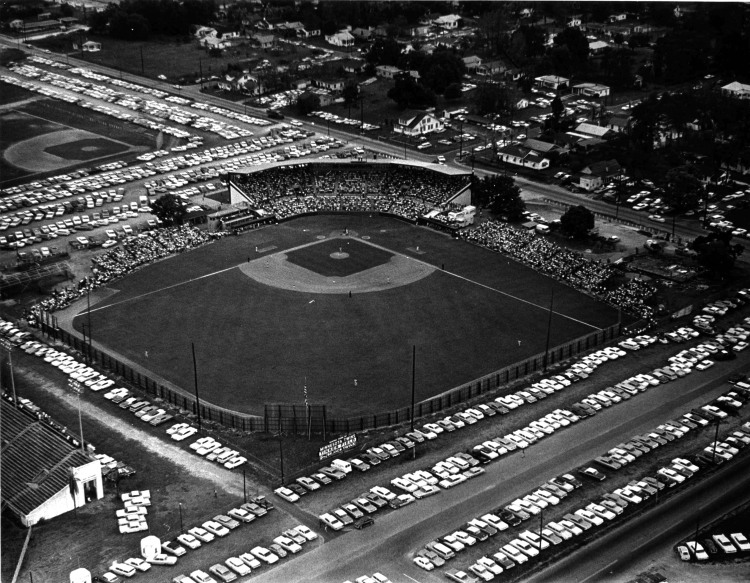
- Tinker Field in 1964
- Interactive map of Tinker Field
- Location: 287 South Tampa Ave, Orlando, Florida
- Coordinates: 28°32′19″N 81°24′17.2″W
- Owner: City of Orlando
- Operator: City of Orlando
- Capacity: 5,014 (1965–2015); 4,000 (1933–1964); 1,500 (1923–1932)
- Surface: Grass
- Field size: Left Field - 340 ft (104 m); Center Field - 412 ft (126 m); Right Field - 320 ft (98 m)

Construction
- Groundbreaking: 1914
- Built: 1914
- Opened: 1923
- Demolished: June 2015

Tenants
- Cincinnati Reds (MLB) (spring training) 1923–1933; Brooklyn Dodgers (MLB) (spring training) 1934–1935; Washington Senators/Minnesota Twins (MLB) (spring training) 1936–1990; Orlando Rays (SAL/SL) 1963–1999; Orlando Suns (FCSL) 2008
- Tinker Field
- U.S. National Register of Historic Places
- Location within Florida Location within the United States
- Location: 1610 W. Church St., Orlando, Florida
- Area: 7 acres (2.8 ha)
- Built: 1922
- NRHP reference No.: 04000456
- Added to NRHP: May 14, 2004

Tinker Field was an outdoor baseball stadium in Orlando, Florida, United States. Named after Baseball Hall of Fame inductee Joe Tinker, it was located in the West Lakes neighborhoods of Downtown Orlando. In April 2015, the City of Orlando tore down the grandstands and removed all other extant buildings, due to its proximity to renovation work on the Orlando Citrus Bowl football stadium (later renamed as Camping World Stadium). The ballpark is now memorialized by Tinker Field History Plaza.

Constructed in 1914, Tinker Field was the spring training home of the Brooklyn Dodgers, Cincinnati Reds, Washington Senators, and Minnesota Twins. It was also the home park of the Orlando Rays minor league baseball team before they moved to Cracker Jack Stadium in 2000. It was located directly adjacent to the western side of the aforementioned football stadium and boasted a capacity of 5,100 before the grandstands were removed in 2015.

== History ==
The field first saw use for baseball in 1914; the first known stadium built on the site was in 1923. It was all-wood construction and seated 1,500. For the next 10 years, the Cincinnati Reds called Tinker Field their spring training home until 1933. The Brooklyn Dodgers trained there in 1934 and 1935. In 1936, Clark Griffith moved spring training of the Washington Senators to Orlando, where the Senators (who later relocated as the Minnesota Twins) trained until after the 1990 season. The stadium was rebuilt again in 1963, and when Griffith Stadium in Washington, D.C., was demolished, nearly 1,000 of the stadium's seats were moved to Tinker Field. The remaining seats were sold by the City of Orlando in 2015. The old press box next to the home side dugout was the original press box and can be seen in photographs as early as the 1920s.

Some college football games were played at the stadium, one example being the 1937 edition of the Orange Blossom Classic.

Tinker Field was added to the United States National Register of Historic Places in 2004. One of the most historical non-baseball events to take place at Tinker Field was a visit from Dr. Martin Luther King Jr. on March 6, 1964. He spoke before thousands of people from the pitcher's mound in his only public speech in the city.

On January 28, 2014, during the groundbreaking of the Orlando Citrus Bowl stadium reconstruction, it was announced that the grandstands and all other extant buildings surrounding Tinker Field would be torn down. The reasons cited were that the expansion of the Orlando Citrus Bowl stadium would shorten right field of Tinker Field so much that it would make it unusable even if it the entire building complex was renovated. On March 9, 2015, Orlando City Council approved an ordinance to demolish the grandstands and buildings, and allocated money to re-create the area surrounding the field.

In September, 2015, the City of Orlando held a public input meeting and unveiled preliminary plans to memorialize Tinker Field. Tinker Field History Plaza opened in May 2018, memorializing civil rights and baseball in Orlando.

== Present ==
Each November, Tinker Field hosts the Electric Daisy Carnival—a three-day festival that features electronic dance music with celebrity DJs, visual effects, rides, and art.

On September 6, 2015, Tinker Field was the site of West Lakes Family Fun Day—an event held by members of the neighborhoods surrounding the field prior to the MEAC/SWAC Challenge.

Each June or July, Tinker Field hosted the Orlando Vans Warped Tour—a one-day festival that features rock music with popular bands from around the world.

== Gallery ==
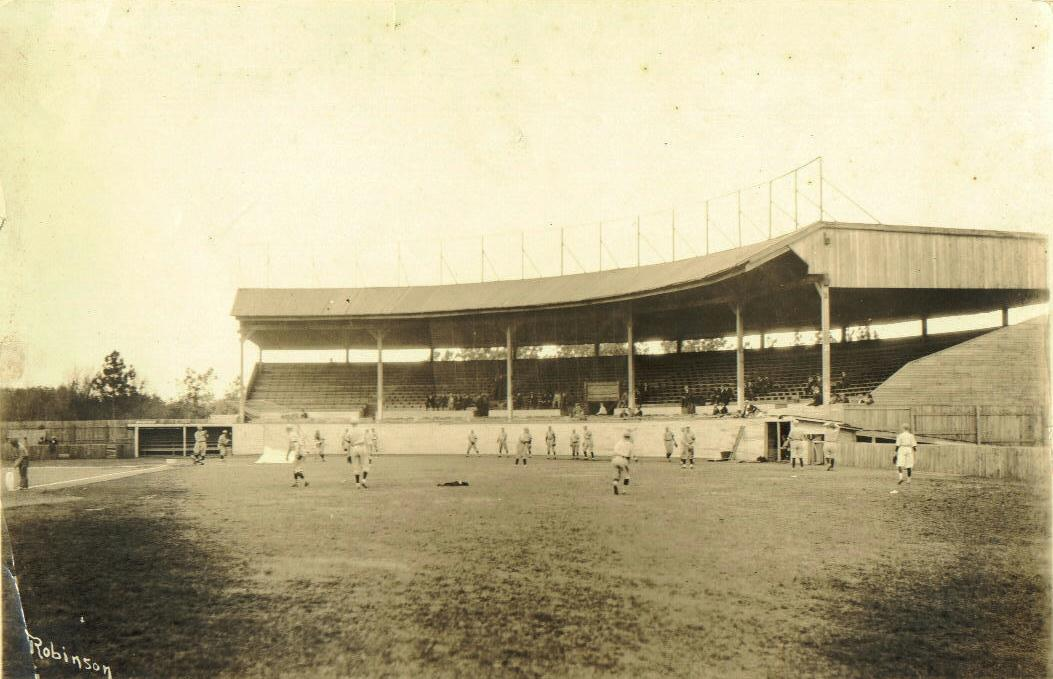
Interior of the original Tinker Field

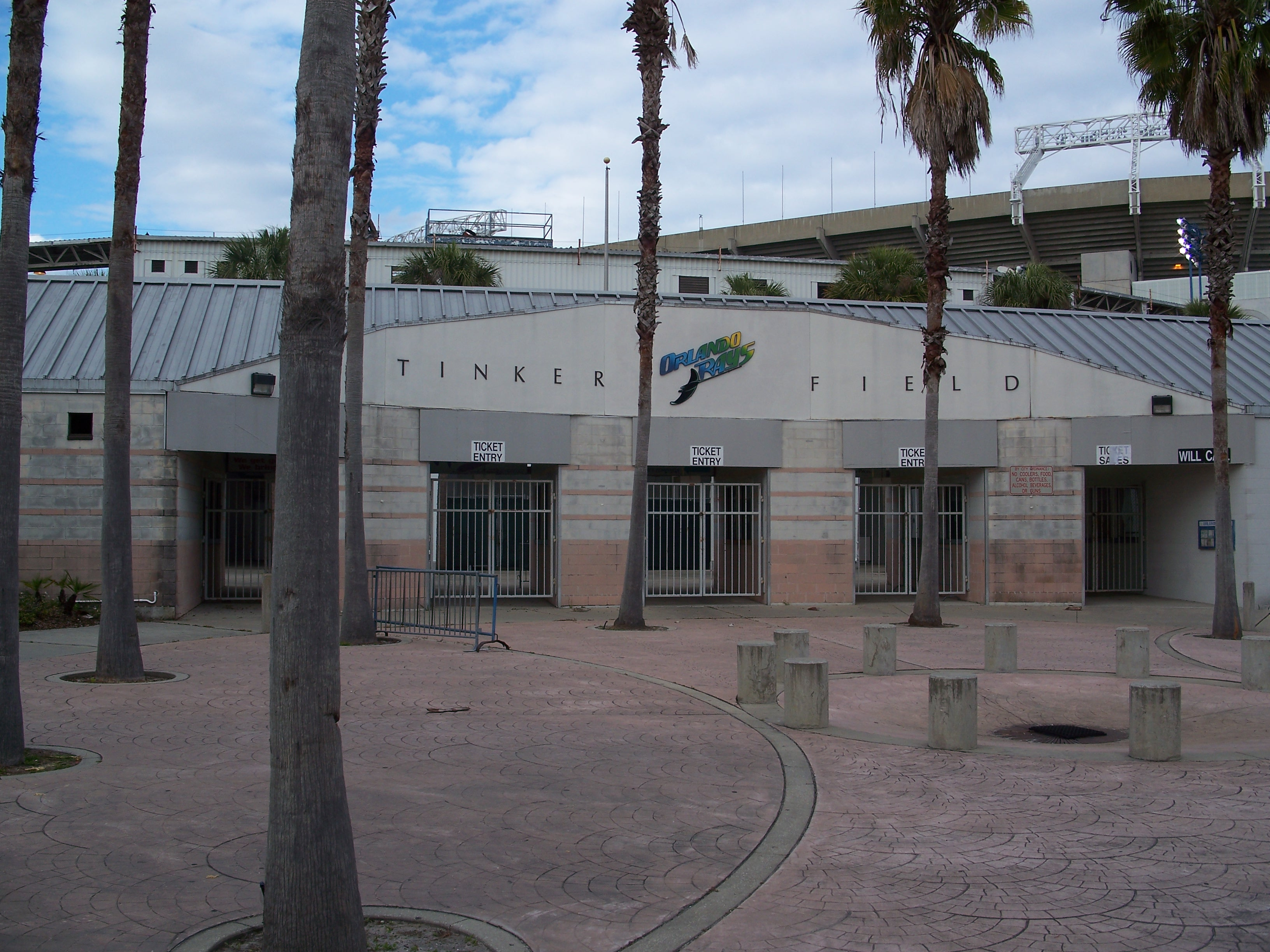
Updated Entry that was added in 1990.

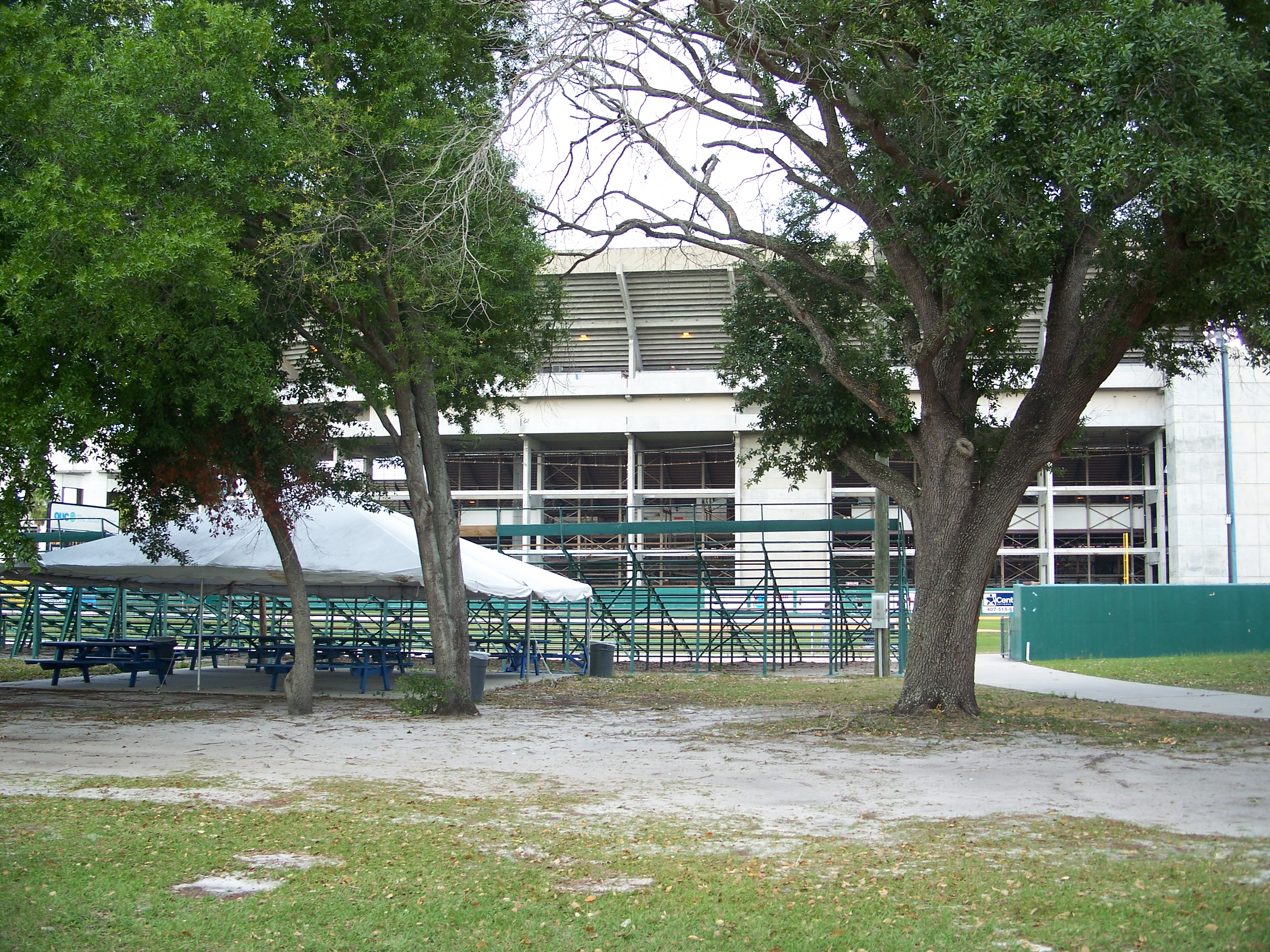
View from Tampa Ave along the Left Field line.

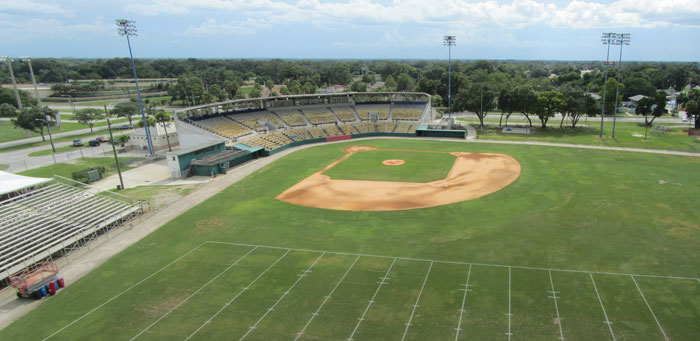
Looking down on Tinker field from The Florida Citrus Bowl.
