= Joe W. Davis Stadium =

Soccer stadium in Huntsville, Alabama, US

Joe Davis Stadium
- "The Joe"
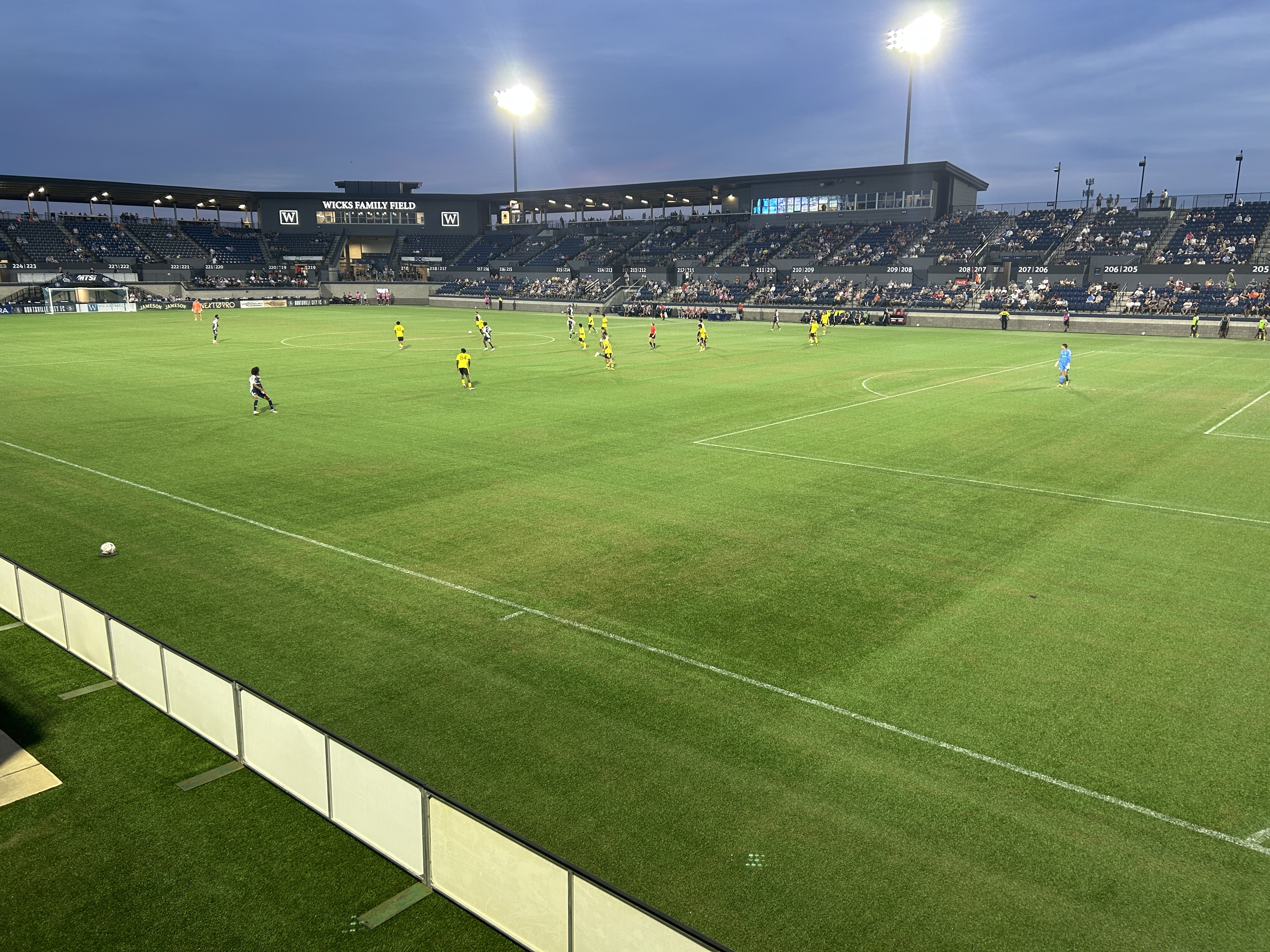
- Interactive map of Joe Davis Stadium
- Full name: Wicks Family Field at Joe Davis Stadium
- Address: 3125 Don Mincher Dr SW; Huntsville, Alabama; United States 35801
- Coordinates: 34°41′58.49″N 86°35′18.59″W
- Owner: City of Huntsville
- Capacity: 6,000
- Surface: Bermudagrass (Tifway 419)
- Scoreboard: 36' x 48'
- Field size: Left Field: 345 feet (105 m); Center Field: 405 feet (123 m); Right Field: 330 feet (100 m)

Construction
- Groundbreaking: September 21, 1984
- Built: 1984–1985
- Opened: April 19, 1985 (baseball); May 19, 2023 (soccer)
- Renovated: 2004–2007; 2023
- Cost: $7.6 million ($22.8 million in 2025)
- Architect: Goodrum Knowles Inc.

Tenants
- Huntsville Stars (SL) (1985–2014); UAH Chargers (NCAA baseball) (1996–2010); Biloxi Shuckers (SL) (2015); Huntsville City FC (MLSNP) (2023–present); Huntsville Astros (IFA) (2025)

Website
- https://www.mlsnextpro.com/huntsvillecityfc/stadium

Wicks Family Field at Joe Davis Stadium (also known locally as Joe Davis Stadium, and simply, "The Joe") is a soccer stadium in Huntsville, Alabama, United States, and was formerly a minor league baseball stadium. Joe Davis Stadium hosted the Huntsville Stars of the Southern League from 1985 until 2014, and then served as a temporary home for the Stars' successor (the Biloxi Shuckers) in 2015. It currently serves as the home to Huntsville City FC, the MLS Next Pro team owned and operated by Nashville SC.

Built in 1985, the stadium is located on the grounds of Huntsville's former airport, adjacent to Huntsville's main north–south thoroughfare, U.S. Highway 231 (S. Memorial Parkway). The multi-purpose stadium seated 10,488 with 15 air-conditioned skyboxes, with seating capacity reduced to 6,000 following renovations completed in 2023. Ticket offices and the general office are located on the second floor of the stadium. Closed-circuit television above the main concourse allows for viewing of the game while grabbing a bite at the concession stands. In addition to baseball and soccer, Joe W. Davis Stadium has been used for high school football, monster truck rallies, and concerts.

Nicknamed "The Crown Jewel of the Southern League" upon its construction, the stadium was the oldest venue in the league during its final year of operation. This was not due to planned obsolescence, but to the fact that all the League's other teams had built new parks since 1985, especially in the 1990s, during a craze prompted by the critically-acclaimed Oriole Park at Camden Yards, occupied by the Baltimore Orioles.

== History ==
=== Baseball ===
The stadium is named for the longtime mayor of Huntsville, Joe W. Davis, who was instrumental in the city's efforts to construct the stadium. Construction came about in 1984 after Nashville Sounds owner Larry Schmittou purchased the Evansville Triplets with the intent of moving the team in 1985 to Nashville, Tennessee, to effectively elevate his Double-A Sounds to the Triple-A level. As a result of this move, the existing Double-A franchise would need a new home. Schmittou considered a swap that would have sent the Double-A team to Evansville, Indiana to replace the Triplets. Evansville city leaders, though, balked at the requested stadium upgrades, leading Schmittou to seek alternate arrangements, which resulted in him moving the franchise to Huntsville, only some 100 miles away from Nashville. The team became known as the Huntsville Stars, and Schmittou continued to own the franchise until selling it to a local ownership group in 1994.

The first game was held on April 19, 1985. The Stars defeated the Birmingham Barons 10–0 in a game that included a grand slam from future major-leaguer Jose Canseco.

On July 10, 1991, the ballpark hosted the first Double-A All-Star Game. A team of American League-affiliated All-Stars defeated a team of National League–affiliated All-Stars 8–2 in front of a crowd of 4,022.

In the mid-2000s, with the stadium approaching two decades in service, renovations began on the stadium, including the replacement of all the stadium's box seats. In 2004, Joe Davis Stadium's current scoreboard, a 36-by-48-foot scoreboard complete with LED numbering and a 12-by-18-foot videoboard, was installed.

In 2014, the Stars were sold to an ownership group with the intent of relocating the franchise to Biloxi, Mississippi, at the end of the season. The sale followed years of failed attempts to secure a new ballpark for the team in Huntsville. However, due to construction delays preventing the new Biloxi stadium from being completed in time for the Southern League's 2015 opening day, and because the franchise was still operating under a lease to use Joe Davis Stadium, the newly christened Biloxi Shuckers were forced to play 15 of its first 25 scheduled home games in Huntsville, with sparse attendance. (The remaining ten home games were played with Biloxi acting as the home team and batting second on its opponents' home fields.)

On May 25, 2015, the final baseball game at Joe Davis Stadium was played, a 7–2 rain-shortened win for the Shuckers over the Barons, marking an end to 31 seasons of minor league baseball in Huntsville. Soon after, the Huntsville city administrator said that the stadium would be razed later in 2015, but its fate was still being debated in May 2018.

In November 2019, the City of Huntsville began implementing plans to renovate the stadium into a multi-use facility, awarding an architectural contract for the design and construction documents needed to put the project out for bid.

Southern League baseball eventually would return to the Huntsville market in the form of the Rocket City Trash Pandas, which began play at the newly-constructed Toyota Field in Madison, Alabama in 2021.

=== Soccer ===
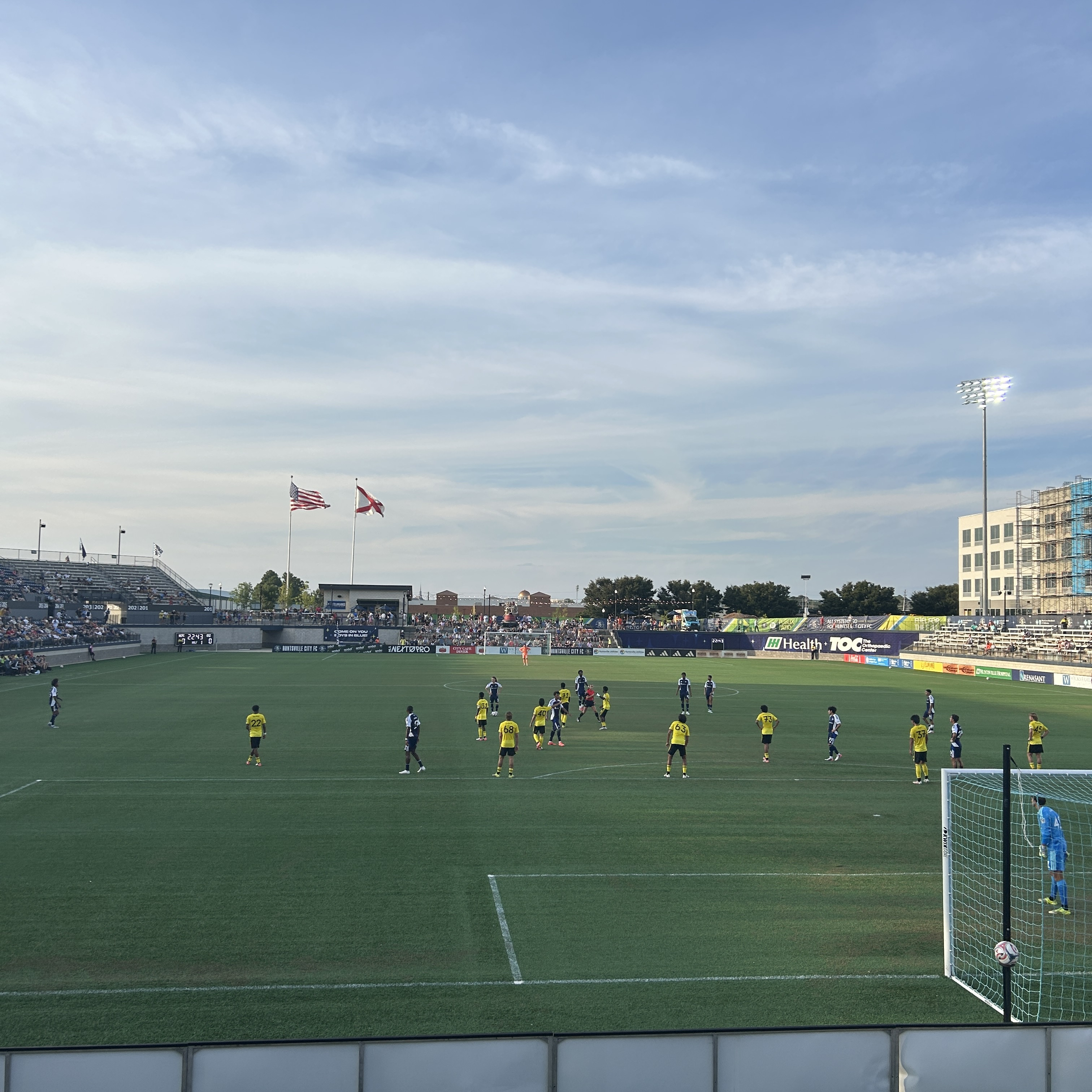
A Huntsville City FC match in 2026

Renovations to Joe Davis Stadium were completed in early 2023. The project reduced the stadium's capacity from over 10,000 to 6,000, mostly through removing seats closest to the playing field. Additional bleacher seating was added in what was formerly the outfield, giving the stadium a more conventional rectangular configuration for soccer and football. Total costs of the stadium's renovation were reported as being $29 million.

Upon the completion of renovations to turn the ballpark into a soccer field, it became the home of Huntsville City FC, the MLS Next Pro affiliate of Major League Soccer's Nashville SC. The stadium was renamed to Wicks Family Field at Joe Davis Stadium.

On May 19, 2023, the stadium hosted its first soccer game, in which Huntsville City FC beat Crown Legacy FC 2–1. A sellout crowd of 5,605 spectators was also the largest attendance of the league's season to that point. The match was also Huntsville City FC's first-ever regulation win, as all their prior victories had been after penalty shootouts.

The stadium hosted its first college soccer game on August 18, 2024, as the North Alabama Lions women's soccer team took on the Jacksonville State Gamecocks in a neutral site matchup. The Gamecocks defeated the Lions, 5–0.

On September 4, 2024, Huntsville City FC played an exhibition match at the stadium against their parent club, Nashville SC. It was the first time a major league team has played in Huntsville since the Milwaukee Brewers played against the Huntsville Stars in 1999.

=== Football ===
In February 2025, it was announced that St. John Paul II Catholic High School's football team would play their home games at Joe Davis Stadium beginning in 2025. Additionally, the Huntsville Astros of the International Football Alliance played here during their 2025 season before the league's collapse.
