= Bill Meyer Stadium =

Baseball field in Knoxville, Tennessee, US

- Interactive map of Bill Meyer Stadium
- Former names: Knoxville Municipal Stadium
- Location: Knoxville, Tennessee
- Coordinates: 35.980446°N 83.913837°W
- Capacity: 6,400

Construction
- Opened: 1953
- Closed: 1999
- Demolished: 2003

Tenant
- Knoxville Smokies (SAL/SL) (1957–1967, 1972–1999)

Bill Meyer Stadium was a baseball field located in Knoxville, Tennessee. Originally known as Knoxville Municipal Stadium when it opened in 1953, it was later renamed after Billy Meyer (1892–1957), a Knoxville native who was a catcher and manager in Major League Baseball and a longtime minor league skipper.

== Baseball usage ==
It was used by minor league baseball teams, most recently the Knoxville Smokies, an AA Minor League Baseball team. It had a capacity of 6,400 people. The stadium was closed in 1999 after the team moved to a new stadium near Sevierville. The stands were demolished, and bleachers with capacity for about 100 people were installed. The stadium is now called Neal Ridley/Todd Helton Field and is used as a venue for amateur baseball games.

== Football usage ==
In the early part of the 1970s, Bill Meyer Stadium was converted into a Pop Warner recreational football league facility. The 100 yard field was striped from the third base side of the diamond, extending out to the right field warning track area. A great majority of the football plays were snapped from the dirt area of the infield. It became the home field for the Fraternal Order of Police (FOP) midget (11- to 12-year-old) football team which held daily practices throughout the fall in the dirt parking area outside the stadium.
