= Greenville Braves =

- 1984–2004; Greenville, South Carolina
Team logo
Cap insignia

Minor league affiliations
- Class: Double-A (1984–2004)
- League: Southern League (1984–2004)

Major league affiliations
- Team: Atlanta Braves (1984–2004)

Team data
- Name: Greenville Braves (1984–2004)
- Colors: Blue, red, white
- Mascot: Tommy Hawk (1997-2004); Dingbat (2000-2004)
- Ballpark: Greenville Municipal Stadium (1984–2004)

The Greenville Braves were a Minor League Baseball team based in Greenville, South Carolina that served as the Double-A farm team of the Atlanta Braves between 1984 and 2004. The Braves played in Greenville Municipal Stadium for all 21 years of their existence.

The team began play in 1984 when the Savannah Braves relocated from Savannah, Georgia. After the 2004 season, the Greenville Braves moved to Pearl, Mississippi, where they were known as the Mississippi Braves.

== History ==
After the 1983 season, the Savannah Braves moved to Greenville, South Carolina, and became known as the Greenville Braves. The team had much success and many famous future Atlanta players such as Tom Glavine, Chipper Jones, Javy López, Jason Marquis, Eddie Pérez, Andruw Jones, and John Rocker played there. They won multiple Southern League championships, and the 1992 edition, managed by Grady Little and featuring Chipper Jones and López, won 100 out of 143 games (.699) during the regular season to take the pennant, then captured the SL playoff title. The 1992 Braves were recognized as one of the 100 greatest minor league teams of all time. After the 2004 season, the parent club in Atlanta transferred the G-Braves to Pearl, Mississippi, where the team was known as the Mississippi Braves. After the 2024 season, the team relocated again to Columbus, Georgia, where they became known as the Columbus Clingstones.

The Braves cited an outdated stadium that did not meet current standards and the City of Greenville's unwillingness to create a sufficient financial package to build a new stadium as the cause of the move. With the Greenville Braves out, the Greenville Bombers (formerly the Capital City Bombers), Class A South Atlantic League affiliate of the Boston Red Sox, moved into the old Braves stadium in 2005. In 2006, a brand new stadium located in Downtown Greenville, Fluor Field at the West End, opened and the Bombers changed their name to the Greenville Drive.

== Greenville Braves (WCL, 1963–64) ==
Greenville also hosted a team in the low Class A Western Carolinas League—the former identity (1960–79) of the South Atlantic League—called the Braves as an affiliate of the Milwaukee Braves in 1963 and 1964. This two-year affiliation was brief, but produced the 1963 playoff champions of the WCL. When the New York Mets replaced the Braves as the team's parent in 1965, the nickname was changed.

== Hall of Fame Alumni ==
- Tom Glavine, All Star starting pitcher and Baseball Hall of Fame inductee in 2014
- Chipper Jones, All Star third baseman and Baseball Hall of Fame inductee in 2018

== Notable former players ==
- Jim Acker, pitcher with the Toronto Blue Jays and Atlanta Braves
- Tommy Greene, All Star pitcher, threw a no hitter for the Philadelphia Phillies.
- Andruw Jones, All Star outfielder, won 10 consecutive Rawlings Gold Glove Awards 1998-2007
- Chipper Jones, Hall of Fame Third Baseman. 1999 MVP. 2008 batting champion.
- David Justice, All Star outfielder. 1990 National League Rookie of the Year.
- Javy Lopez, All Star catcher, NLCS MVP
- Jason Marquis, All Star starting pitcher, Silver Slugger Award
- Kent Mercker, starting pitcher
- Adam Wainwright, All Star starting pitcher
- Turk Wendell, the most superstitious athlete of all time by Men's Journal.
- Mark Wohlers, All Star reliever, threw a combined no-hitter in 1991

== Season-by-season records ==
The following is a list of the Greenville Braves season-by-season record.

Year	Team name	Wins	Losses	Pct.	Manager
1963	Greenville Braves	59	65	0.476	Jim Fanning and Paul Snyder
1964	Greenville Braves	63	63	0.500	Bill Steinecke and Jimmy Brown
1984	Greenville Braves	80	67	0.567	Bobby Dews and Leo Mazzone
1985	Greenville Braves	70	74	0.486	Jim Beauchamp
1986	Greenville Braves	73	71	0.486	Jim Beauchamp
1987	Greenville Braves	70	74	0.786	Jim Beauchamp
1988	Greenville Braves	87	57	0.604	Buddy Bailey and Russ Nixon
1989	Greenville Braves	70	69	0.504	Buddy Bailey
1990	Greenville Braves	57	87	0.396	Buddy Bailey
1991	Greenville Braves	88	56	0.611	Chris Chambliss
1992	Greenville Braves	100	43	0.699	Grady Little
1993	Greenville Braves	70	67	0.511	Bruce Kimm
1994	Greenville Braves	73	63	0.537	Bruce Benedict
1995	Greenville Braves	59	83	0.415	Bruce Benedict
1996	Greenville Braves	58	82	0.414	Jeff Cox
1997	Greenville Braves	74	66	0.529	Randy Ingle
1998	Greenville Braves	67	72	0.482	Randy Ingle
1999	Greenville Braves	58	80	0.420	Paul Runge
2000	Greenville Braves	68	71	0.489	Paul Runge
2001	Greenville Braves	60	79	0.432	Paul Runge
2002	Greenville Braves	65	63	0.485	Brian Snitker
2003	Greenville Braves	68	70	0.493	Brian Snitker
2004	Greenville Braves	63	76	0.453	Brian Snitker
