= Orlando Rays =

- 1973–2003; Orlando, Florida
Team logo
Cap insignia

Minor league affiliations
- Class: Class AA (1973–2003)
- League: Southern League (1973–2003)

Major league affiliations
- Team: Tampa Bay Devil Rays (1999–2003); Seattle Mariners (1998); Chicago Cubs (1993–1997); Minnesota Twins (1973–1992)

Minor league titles
- League titles (3): 1981; 1991; 1999

Team data
- Name: Orlando Rays (1997–2003); Orlando Cubs (1993–1996); Orlando Sun Rays (1990–1992); Orlando Twins (1973–1989)
- Colors: Black, green, blue, white
- Ballpark: Tinker Field (1973–1999); Champion Stadium (2000–2003)

The Orlando Rays were a Minor League baseball team that played in the Southern League from 1973–2003. They were located in Orlando, Florida, and played their home games at Tinker Field for most of their existence. They served as a farm club for four Major League Baseball teams: the Minnesota Twins (1973–1992), Chicago Cubs (1993–1997), Seattle Mariners (1998), and Tampa Bay Devil Rays (1999–2003).

They were known as the Orlando Twins from 1973–1989, the Orlando Sun Rays from 1990–1992, the Orlando Cubs from 1993–1996, and the Orlando Rays from 1997–2003.

After the 2003 season, the franchise moved to Montgomery, Alabama and became the Montgomery Biscuits.

== History ==
After the 1972 season, the Minnesota Twins moved their Southern League affiliate, the Charlotte Hornets, to Orlando, calling them the Orlando Twins. The Twins played at Tinker Field in downtown Orlando, near the Florida Citrus Bowl Stadium. In 1990, the team was renamed the Orlando Sun Rays. In 1993, the Chicago Cubs became the team's new major-league affiliate, and the team was renamed the Orlando Cubs. While still a Chicago Cubs affiliate, the team renamed itself once again in 1997 and became the Orlando Rays. The following year, for one season only, the Seattle Mariners were the Rays' major-league affiliate. The Tampa Bay Rays (then the Devil Rays), an American League expansion team in 1998, assumed the Orlando Rays' major-league affiliation the following year.

The Orlando Rays' last season at Tinker Field was 1999. From 2000 to 2003, the Orlando Rays played in Kissimmee, Florida, in Champion Stadium at Walt Disney World Resort. Despite the fact that the team played in a state-of-the-art stadium that was built in 1997 and used during spring training by the Atlanta Braves, attendance did not meet expectations; after trailing the Southern League in attendance in multiple years, the Rays' owners announced the team would move to Montgomery, Alabama in 2004 (terminating their 10-year lease with Disney after four seasons). The team is now known as the Montgomery Biscuits.

== Post franchise events ==
On June 17, 2016 as part of a charity appeal following the Orlando nightclub shooting, the Tampa Bay Rays wore Orlando Rays caps during their game against the San Francisco Giants. The team also wore Orlando Rays caps in a spring training game on February 28, 2023, while playing home games at the Disney World's ESPN Wide World of Sports.

== Notable Orlando alumni ==
- Ryne Sandberg (1993) Inducted Baseball Hall of Fame, 2005
- Paul Abbott (1989)
- Lyman Bostock (1973) Died: Age 27
- Randy Bush (1979–1981)
- John Castino (1977–1978) 1979 Al Rookie of the Year
- Carl Crawford (2001) 4x MLB All-Star
- Trevor Enders (2000)
- Gary Gaetti 2 x MLB All-Star
- Greg Gagne (1982)
- Ron Gardenhire (1989–1990, MGR) 2010 AL Manager of the Year
- Jonny Gomes (2003)
- Mark Guthrie (1989)
- Josh Hamilton (2001) 5 x MLB All-Star; 2010 AL Most Valuable Player
- Jose Hernandez (1993) MLB All-Star
- Aubrey Huff (1999)
- Tom Kelly (1982, MGR) 1991 AL Manager of the Year; Manager: 2 x World Series Champion - Minnesota Twins (1987, 1991)
- Chuck Knoblauch (1990) 4x MLB All-Star; 1991 AL Rookie of the Year
- Tim Laudner (1979–1980) MLB All-Star
- Charlie Manuel (1964–1965)(1984–1985, MGR) Manager: 2008 World Series Champion - Philadelphia Phillies
- Jim Morris (1999) Subject: Movie, The Rookie
- Mike Morgan (1995) MLB All-Star
- Denny Neagle (1990) 2x MLB All-Star
- Joel Piniero (1998)
- Mark Portugal (1984)
- Phil Roof (1983,1992, MGR)
- Paul Sorrento (1989)
- Tim Teufel (1980–1982)
- B.J. Upton (2003)
- Frank Viola (1981) 3x MLB All-Star; 1987 World Series Most Valuable Player; 1988 AL Cy Young Award
- Gary Ward (1976) 2 x MLB All-Star
- Rob Wilfong (1974–1975)
- Kerry Wood (1997) 2x MLB All-Star; 1998 NL Rookie of the Year
