= 1972 Southern League season =

- League: Southern League
- Sport: Baseball
- Duration: April 11 – August 31
- Games: 140
- Teams: 8

Regular season
- League champions: Asheville Orioles
- Season MVP: Mike Reinbach, Asheville Orioles

Playoffs
- League champions: Montgomery Rebels
- Runners-up: Asheville Orioles

SL seasons
- ← 1971 1973 →

The 1972 Southern League was a Class AA baseball season played between April 11 and August 31. Eight teams played a 140-game schedule, with the top team in each division qualifying for the championship round.

The Montgomery Rebels won the Southern League championship, as they defeated the Asheville Orioles in the playoffs.

== League changes ==
- In 1971, the Dixie Association was an interleague partnership between the Southern League and the Texas League as the two leagues played an interlocking schedule. The partnership was dissolved after the season.
- The league introduced two four-team divisions: the East Division and the West Division.

== Team changes ==
- The Asheville Tourists returned to the Southern League from the Dixie Association. The club ended their affiliation with the Chicago White Sox and began a new affiliation with the Baltimore Orioles. The team was renamed to the Asheville Orioles.
- The Birmingham Athletics returned to the Southern League from the Dixie Association.
- The Charlotte Hornets returned to the Southern League from the Dixie Association.
- The Columbus Astros returned to the Southern League from the Dixie Association.
- The Jacksonville Suns returned to the Southern League from the Dixie Association. The club ended their affiliation with the Cleveland Indians and began a new affiliation with the Kansas City Royals.
- The Montgomery Rebels returned to the Southern League from the Dixie Association.
- The Savannah Braves returned to the Southern League from the Dixie Association.
- The Knoxville Smokies returned to the Southern League following a hiatus since the 1967 season. The club began an affiliation with the Chicago White Sox and were renamed to the Knoxville Sox.

== Teams ==
1972 Southern League
Division	Team	City	MLB Affiliate	Stadium
East	Asheville Orioles	Asheville, North Carolina	Baltimore Orioles	McCormick Field
East	Charlotte Hornets	Charlotte, North Carolina	Minnesota Twins	Clark Griffith Park
East	Jacksonville Suns	Jacksonville, Florida	Kansas City Royals	Wolfson Park
East	Savannah Braves	Savannah, Georgia	Atlanta Braves	Grayson Stadium
West	Birmingham Athletics	Birmingham, Alabama	Oakland Athletics	Rickwood Field
West	Columbus Astros	Columbus, Georgia	Houston Astros	Golden Park
West	Knoxville Sox	Knoxville, Tennessee	Chicago White Sox	Bill Meyer Stadium
West	Montgomery Rebels	Montgomery, Alabama	Detroit Tigers	Paterson Field

== Map of teams ==
East Division West Division

== Regular season ==
=== Summary ===
- The Asheville Orioles finished the season with the best record in the league for the first time.

=== Standings ===
East Division
Team	Win	Loss	%	GB
Asheville Orioles	81	58	.583	–
Savannah Braves	80	59	.576	1
Charlotte Hornets	70	70	.500	11.5
Jacksonville Suns	64	75	.460	17
West Division
Montgomery Rebels	78	61	.561	–
Knoxville Sox	76	64	.543	2.5
Columbus Astros	59	80	.424	19
Birmingham Athletics	49	90	.353	29

== League Leaders ==
=== Batting leaders ===
Stat	Player	Total
AVG	Mike Reinbach, Asheville Orioles	.346
H	Mike Reinbach, Asheville Orioles	169
R	Mike Reinbach, Asheville Orioles	123
2B	Mike Reinbach, Asheville Orioles	32
3B	Jerry Hairston Sr., Knoxville Sox; Jim Hoppe, Charlotte Hornets; Keith Lieppman, Birmingham Athletics	9
HR	Mike Reinbach, Asheville Orioles	30
RBI	Mike Reinbach, Asheville Orioles	109
SB	Rod Gilbreath, Savannah Braves	45

=== Pitching leaders ===
Stat	Player	Total
W	Paul Mitchell, Asheville Orioles	16
ERA	Larry Maxie, Savannah Braves	1.54
CG	Bill Campbell, Charlotte Hornets	14
SHO	Herb Hutson, Asheville Orioles	5
SV	Dutch Weems, Asheville Orioles	22
IP	Danny Fife, Montgomery Rebels	221.0
SO	Bill Campbell, Charlotte Hornets	204

== Playoffs ==
- The league finals is a best-of-five series.
- The Montgomery Rebels won their first Southern League championship, defeating the Asheville Orioles in three games.

=== Playoff bracket ===
Finals
E1	Asheville	0
W1	Montgomery	3

== Awards ==
Southern League awards
Award name	Recipient
Most Valuable Player	Mike Reinbach, Asheville Orioles
Pitcher of the Year	Bill Campbell, Charlotte Hornets
Manager of the Year	Joe Sparks, Knoxville Sox

== See also ==
- 1972 Major League Baseball season
