= 1975 Southern League season =

- League: Southern League
- Sport: Baseball
- Duration: April 15 – September 5
- Number of games: 140
- Number of teams: 8

Regular season
- League champions: Orlando Twins
- Season MVP: Mike Squires, Knoxville Sox

Playoffs
- League champions: Montgomery Rebels
- Runners-up: Orlando Twins

SL seasons
- ← 1974 1976 →

The 1975 Southern League was a Class AA baseball season played between April 15 and September 5. Eight teams played a 140-game schedule, with the top team in each division qualifying for the championship round.

The Montgomery Rebels won the Southern League championship, as they defeated the Orlando Twins in the playoffs.

== Teams ==
1975 Southern League
Division	Team	City	MLB Affiliate	Stadium
East	Columbus Astros	Columbus, Georgia	Houston Astros	Golden Park
East	Jacksonville Suns	Jacksonville, Florida	Kansas City Royals	Wolfson Park
East	Orlando Twins	Orlando, Florida	Minnesota Twins	Tinker Field
East	Savannah Braves	Savannah, Georgia	Atlanta Braves	Grayson Stadium
West	Asheville Orioles	Asheville, North Carolina	Baltimore Orioles	McCormick Field
West	Birmingham Athletics	Birmingham, Alabama	Oakland Athletics	Rickwood Field
West	Knoxville Sox	Knoxville, Tennessee	Chicago White Sox	Bill Meyer Stadium
West	Montgomery Rebels	Montgomery, Alabama	Detroit Tigers	Paterson Field

== Map of teams ==
East Division West Division

== Regular season ==
=== Summary ===
- The Orlando Twins finished the season with the best record in the league for the first time in team history.

=== Standings ===
East Division
Team	Win	Loss	%	GB
Orlando Twins	81	57	.587	–
Columbus Astros	70	64	.522	9
Savannah Braves	70	64	.522	9
Jacksonville Suns	59	79	.428	22
West Division
Montgomery Rebels	73	61	.545	–
Birmingham Athletics	65	69	.485	8
Asheville Orioles	63	75	.457	12
Knoxville Sox	63	75	.457	12

== League Leaders ==
=== Batting leaders ===
Stat	Player	Total
AVG	Charles Heil, Asheville Orioles	.322
H	Derek Bryant, Birmingham Athletics	147
R	Calvin Portley, Columbus Astros	82
2B	Cleo Kilpatrick, Knoxville Sox	30
3B	Dan Gonzales, Montgomery Rebels	11
HR	Jim Obradovich, Orlando Twins	27
RBI	Jim Obradovich, Orlando Twins	74
SB	Sheldon Mallory, Jacksonville Suns	42

=== Pitching leaders ===
Stat	Player	Total
W	Ken Kravec, Knoxville Sox; Bob Maneely, Orlando Twins; Bob Sykes, Montgomery Rebels	14
ERA	Dan Larson, Columbus Astros	2.18
CG	Mike Parrott, Asheville Orioles	14
SHO	Chris Batton, Birmingham Athletics; Dave Hasbach, Jacksonville Suns; Bob Maneely, Orlando Twins	4
SV	Lew Lerner, Orlando Twins	9
IP	Joe Sambito, Columbus Astros	209.0
SO	Joe Sambito, Columbus Astros	140

== Playoffs ==
- The Montgomery Rebels won their third Southern League championship, defeating the Orlando Twins in three games.

=== Playoff bracket ===
Finals
E1	Orlando	0
W1	Montgomery	3

== Awards ==
Southern League awards
Award name	Recipient
Most Valuable Player	Mike Squires, Knoxville Sox
Pitcher of the Year	Bob Maneely, Orlando Twins
Manager of the Year	Dick Phillips, Orlando Twins

== See also ==
- 1975 Major League Baseball season
