= 1982 Southern League season =

- League: Southern League
- Sport: Baseball
- Duration: April 9 – August 31
- Number of games: 144
- Number of teams: 10

Regular season
- League champions: Jacksonville Suns
- Season MVP: Brian Dayett, Nashville Sounds

Playoffs
- League champions: Nashville Sounds
- Runners-up: Jacksonville Suns

SL seasons
- ← 1981 1983 →

The 1982 Southern League was a Class AA baseball season played between April 9 and August 31. Ten teams played a 144-game schedule, with the top team in each division in each half of the season qualifying for the post-season.

The Nashville Sounds won the Southern League championship, as they defeated the Jacksonville Suns in the playoffs.

== Teams ==
1982 Southern League
Division	Team	City	MLB Affiliate	Stadium
East	Charlotte Orioles	Charlotte, North Carolina	Baltimore Orioles	Jim Crockett Memorial Park
East	Columbus Astros	Columbus, Georgia	Houston Astros	Golden Park
East	Jacksonville Suns	Jacksonville, Florida	Kansas City Royals	Wolfson Park
East	Orlando Twins	Orlando, Florida	Minnesota Twins	Tinker Field
East	Savannah Braves	Savannah, Georgia	Atlanta Braves	Grayson Stadium
West	Birmingham Barons	Birmingham, Alabama	Detroit Tigers	Rickwood Field
West	Chattanooga Lookouts	Chattanooga, Tennessee	Cleveland Indians	Engel Stadium
West	Knoxville Blue Jays	Knoxville, Tennessee	Toronto Blue Jays	Bill Meyer Stadium
West	Memphis Chicks	Memphis, Tennessee	Montreal Expos	Tim McCarver Stadium
West	Nashville Sounds	Nashville, Tennessee	New York Yankees	Herschel Greer Stadium

== Map of teams ==
East Division West Division

== Regular season ==
=== Summary ===
- The Jacksonville Suns finished the season with the best record in the league for the first time since 1974.
- The Jacksonville Suns won the East Division in both halves of the season. The Columbus Astros took the second playoff berth in the division as they had the second best overall record in the division.

=== Standings ===
East Division
Team	Win	Loss	%	GB
Jacksonville Suns	83	61	.576	–
Columbus Astros	74	69	.517	8.5
Orlando Twins	74	70	.514	9
Savannah Braves	69	75	.479	14
Charlotte Orioles	66	77	.462	16.5
West Division
Nashville Sounds	77	67	.535	–
Knoxville Blue Jays	73	71	.507	4
Memphis Chicks	70	74	.486	7
Birmingham Barons	69	74	.483	7.5
Chattanooga Lookouts	63	80	.441	13.5

== League Leaders ==
=== Batting leaders ===
Stat	Player	Total
AVG	Kenny Baker, Birmingham Barons	.342
H	Buck Showalter, Nashville Sounds	152
R	Mike Fuentes, Memphis Chicks	104
2B	Dave Hoeksema, Memphis Chicks	33
3B	John Denman, Charlotte Orioles	10
HR	Mike Fuentes, Memphis Chicks	37
RBI	Mike Fuentes, Memphis Chicks	115
SB	Milt Thompson, Savannah Braves	68

=== Pitching leaders ===
Stat	Player	Total
W	Clay Christiansen, Nashville Sounds; Stefan Wever, Nashville Sounds	16
ERA	Stefan Wever, Nashville Sounds	2.78
CG	Robin Fuson, Chattanooga Lookouts	15
SHO	Glenn Ray, Jacksonville Suns	4
SV	Tom Lukish, Knoxville Blue Jays	20
IP	Robin Fuson, Chattanooga Lookouts	222.1
SO	Stefan Wever, Nashville Sounds	191

== Playoffs ==
- The Nashville Sounds won their second Southern League championship, defeating the Jacksonville Suns in four games.

=== Playoff bracket ===
Division finals
E1	Jacksonville	3
E2	Columbus	1
W1	Nashville	3
W2	Knoxville	1

Finals
E1	Jacksonville	1
W1	Nashville	3

== Awards ==
Southern League awards
Award name	Recipient
Most Valuable Player	Brian Dayett, Nashville Sounds
Pitcher of the Year	Stefan Wever, Nashville Sounds
Manager of the Year	Gene Lamont, Jacksonville Suns

== See also ==
- 1982 Major League Baseball season
