= 1974 Southern League season =

- League: Southern League
- Sport: Baseball
- Duration: April 16 – September 5
- Number of games: 140
- Number of teams: 8

Regular season
- League champions: Jacksonville Suns
- Season MVP: Nyls Nyman, Knoxville Sox

Playoffs
- League champions: Knoxville Sox
- Runners-up: Jacksonville Suns

SL seasons
- ← 1973 1975 →

The 1974 Southern League was a Class AA baseball season played between April 16 and September 5. Eight teams played a 140-game schedule, with the top team in each division qualifying for the championship round.

The Knoxville Sox won the Southern League championship, as they defeated the Jacksonville Suns in the playoffs.

== Teams ==
1974 Southern League
Division	Team	City	MLB Affiliate	Stadium
East	Columbus Astros	Columbus, Georgia	Houston Astros	Golden Park
East	Jacksonville Suns	Jacksonville, Florida	Kansas City Royals	Wolfson Park
East	Orlando Twins	Orlando, Florida	Minnesota Twins	Tinker Field
East	Savannah Braves	Savannah, Georgia	Atlanta Braves	Grayson Stadium
West	Asheville Orioles	Asheville, North Carolina	Baltimore Orioles	McCormick Field
West	Birmingham Athletics	Birmingham, Alabama	Oakland Athletics	Rickwood Field
West	Knoxville Sox	Knoxville, Tennessee	Chicago White Sox	Bill Meyer Stadium
West	Montgomery Rebels	Montgomery, Alabama	Detroit Tigers	Paterson Field

== Map of teams ==
East Division West Division

== Regular season ==
=== Summary ===
- The Jacksonville Suns finished the season with the best record in the league for the first time in team history.

=== Standings ===
East Division
Team	Win	Loss	%	GB
Jacksonville Suns	78	60	.565	–
Orlando Twins	73	61	.545	3
Savannah Braves	73	65	.529	5
Columbus Astros	65	73	.471	13
West Division
Knoxville Sox	72	63	.533	–
Asheville Orioles	70	67	.511	3
Montgomery Rebels	61	76	.445	12
Birmingham Athletics	54	81	.400	18

== League Leaders ==
=== Batting leaders ===
Stat	Player	Total
AVG	Nyls Nyman, Knoxville Sox	.326
H	Nyls Nyman, Knoxville Sox	166
R	Nyls Nyman, Knoxville Sox	87
2B	Jesús de la Rosa, Columbus Astros	34
3B	Nyls Nyman, Knoxville Sox	9
HR	Bob Gorinski, Orlando Twins; Mike Poepping, Orlando Twins	23
RBI	Bob Gorinski, Orlando Twins	100
SB	Kenzie Davis, Jacksonville Suns	38

=== Pitching leaders ===
Stat	Player	Total
W	Domingo Figueroa, Savannah Braves; Paul Siebert, Columbus Astros	15
ERA	Mike Beard, Savannah Braves	2.40
CG	Paul Siebert, Columbus Astros	18
SHO	Randy Benson, Asheville Orioles; Mike Flanagan, Asheville Orioles; Greg Thayer, Orlando Twins; Paul Siebert, Columbus Astros; Douglas Wessel, Asheville Orioles	3
SV	Charles Sprinkle, Knoxville Sox	14
IP	Paul Siebert, Columbus Astros	211.0
SO	Mike Stanton, Columbus Astros	146

== Playoffs ==
- The Knoxville Sox won their first Southern League championship, defeating the Jacksonville Suns in five games.

=== Playoff bracket ===
Finals
E1	Jacksonville	2
W1	Knoxville	3

== Awards ==
Southern League awards
Award name	Recipient
Most Valuable Player	Nyls Nyman, Knoxville Sox
Pitcher of the Year	Paul Siebert, Columbus Astros
Manager of the Year	Jim Napier, Knoxville Sox

== See also ==
- 1974 Major League Baseball season
