= 1980 Southern League season =

- League: Southern League
- Sport: Baseball
- Duration: April 11 – September 1
- Number of games: 144
- Number of teams: 10

Regular season
- League champions: Nashville Sounds
- Season MVP: Steve Balboni, Nashville Sounds

Playoffs
- League champions: Charlotte Orioles
- Runners-up: Memphis Chicks

SL seasons
- ← 1979 1981 →

The 1980 Southern League was a Class AA baseball season played between April 11 and September 1. Ten teams played a 144-game schedule, with the top team in each division in each half of the season qualifying for the post-season.

The Charlotte Orioles won the Southern League championship, as they defeated the Memphis Chicks in the playoffs.

== Team changes ==
- The Knoxville Sox ended their affiliation with the Chicago White Sox and began a new affiliation with the Toronto Blue Jays. The club was renamed to the Knoxville Blue Jays.
- The Nashville Sounds ended their affiliation with the Cincinnati Reds and began a new affiliation with the New York Yankees.

== Teams ==
1980 Southern League
Division	Team	City	MLB Affiliate	Stadium
East	Charlotte Orioles	Charlotte, North Carolina	Baltimore Orioles	Jim Crockett Memorial Park
East	Columbus Astros	Columbus, Georgia	Houston Astros	Golden Park
East	Jacksonville Suns	Jacksonville, Florida	Kansas City Royals	Wolfson Park
East	Orlando Twins	Orlando, Florida	Minnesota Twins	Tinker Field
East	Savannah Braves	Savannah, Georgia	Atlanta Braves	Grayson Stadium
West	Chattanooga Lookouts	Chattanooga, Tennessee	Cleveland Indians	Engel Stadium
West	Knoxville Blue Jays	Knoxville, Tennessee	Toronto Blue Jays	Bill Meyer Stadium
West	Memphis Chicks	Memphis, Tennessee	Montreal Expos	Tim McCarver Stadium
West	Montgomery Rebels	Montgomery, Alabama	Detroit Tigers	Paterson Field
West	Nashville Sounds	Nashville, Tennessee	New York Yankees	Herschel Greer Stadium

== Map of teams ==
East Division West Division

== Regular season ==
=== Summary ===
- The Nashville Sounds finished the season with the best record in the league for the first time in team history.

=== Standings ===
East Division
Team	Win	Loss	%	GB
Savannah Braves	77	67	.535	–
Columbus Astros	76	68	.528	1
Charlotte Orioles	72	72	.500	5
Orlando Twins	65	78	.455	11.5
Jacksonville Suns	63	81	.438	14
West Division
Nashville Sounds	97	46	.678	–
Memphis Chicks	83	61	.576	14.5
Montgomery Rebels	68	76	.472	29.5
Chattanooga Lookouts	61	83	.424	36.5
Knoxville Blue Jays	57	87	.396	40.5

== League Leaders ==
=== Batting leaders ===
Stat	Player	Total
AVG	Chris Bando, Chattanooga Lookouts	.349
H	Buck Showalter, Nashville Sounds	178
R	Steve Balboni, Nashville Sounds	101
2B	Ron Johnson, Jacksonville Suns	40
3B	Ted Wilborn, Nashville Sounds	14
HR	Steve Balboni, Nashville Sounds	34
RBI	Steve Balboni, Nashville Sounds	122
SB	Tony Johnson, Memphis Chicks	60

=== Pitching leaders ===
Stat	Player	Total
W	Jim MacDonald, Columbus Astros	17
ERA	Andy McGaffigan, Nashville Sounds	2.38
CG	George Cappuzzello, Montgomery Rebels; Larry Pashnick, Montgomery Rebels; Bryn Smith, Memphis Chicks; Don Welchel, Charlotte Orioles	12
SHO	George Cappuzzello, Montgomery Rebels	6
SV	Stuart Livingstone, Savannah Braves	17
IP	Steve Bedrosian, Savannah Braves	203.0
SO	Steve Bedrosian, Savannah Braves	161

== Playoffs ==
- The Charlotte Orioles won their first Southern League championship, defeating the Memphis Chicks in four games.

=== Playoff bracket ===
Division finals
E1	Savannah	0
E2	Charlotte	3
W1	Nashville	1
W2	Memphis	3

Finals
E2	Charlotte	3
W2	Memphis	1

== Awards ==
Southern League awards
Award name	Recipient
Most Valuable Player	Steve Balboni, Nashville Sounds
Pitcher of the Year	Andy McGaffigan, Nashville Sounds
Manager of the Year	Stump Merrill, Nashville Sounds

== See also ==
- 1980 Major League Baseball season
