= 1973 Southern League season =

- League: Southern League
- Sport: Baseball
- Duration: April 13 – September 1
- Number of games: 140
- Number of teams: 8

Regular season
- League champions: Montgomery Rebels
- Season MVP: Jerry Moxey, Columbus Astros

Playoffs
- League champions: Montgomery Rebels
- Runners-up: Jacksonville Suns

SL seasons
- ← 1972 1974 →

The 1973 Southern League was a Class AA baseball season played between April 13 and September 1. Eight teams played a 140-game schedule, with the top team in each division qualifying for the championship round.

The Montgomery Rebels won the Southern League championship, as they defeated the Jacksonville Suns in the playoffs.

== Team changes ==
- The Charlotte Hornets disbanded.
- The Orlando Twins join the league from the Florida State League and will play in the East Division. The club is affiliated with the Minnesota Twins.
- The Asheville Orioles move to the West Division.
- The Columbus Astros move to the East Division.

== Teams ==
1973 Southern League
Division	Team	City	MLB Affiliate	Stadium
East	Columbus Astros	Columbus, Georgia	Houston Astros	Golden Park
East	Jacksonville Suns	Jacksonville, Florida	Kansas City Royals	Wolfson Park
East	Orlando Twins	Orlando, Florida	Minnesota Twins	Tinker Field
East	Savannah Braves	Savannah, Georgia	Atlanta Braves	Grayson Stadium
West	Asheville Orioles	Asheville, North Carolina	Baltimore Orioles	McCormick Field
West	Birmingham Athletics	Birmingham, Alabama	Oakland Athletics	Rickwood Field
West	Knoxville Sox	Knoxville, Tennessee	Chicago White Sox	Bill Meyer Stadium
West	Montgomery Rebels	Montgomery, Alabama	Detroit Tigers	Paterson Field

== Map of teams ==
East Division West Division

== Regular season ==
=== Summary ===
- The Montgomery Rebels finished the season with the best record in the league for the first time in team history.

=== Standings ===
East Division
Team	Win	Loss	%	GB
Jacksonville Suns	76	60	.559	–
Savannah Braves	71	68	.511	6.5
Columbus Astros	69	70	.496	8.5
Orlando Twins	65	70	.481	10.5
West Division
Montgomery Rebels	80	58	.580	–
Asheville Orioles	71	69	.507	10
Knoxville Sox	70	69	.504	10.5
Birmingham Athletics	50	88	.362	30

== League Leaders ==
=== Batting leaders ===
Stat	Player	Total
AVG	Rob Andrews, Asheville Orioles	.309
H	Rob Andrews, Asheville Orioles	167
R	Rob Andrews, Asheville Orioles	98
2B	Taylor Duncan, Asheville Orioles; Leon Roberts, Montgomery Rebels	30
3B	Jerry Moxey, Columbus Astros	13
HR	Terry Clapp, Asheville Orioles	35
RBI	Terry Clapp, Asheville Orioles	98
SB	Alberto Leaver, Columbus Astros	54

=== Pitching leaders ===
Stat	Player	Total
W	Joe Henderson, Knoxville Sox	17
ERA	Ross Rothermel, Columbus Astros	1.81
CG	Doug Konieczny, Columbus Astros	17
SHO	Charles Swanson, Montgomery Rebels	6
SV	Jerome Donahue, Montgomery Rebels	11
IP	Doug Konieczny, Columbus Astros	213.0
SO	Doug Konieczny, Columbus Astros	222

== Playoffs ==
- The Montgomery Rebels won their second consecutive Southern League championship, defeating the Jacksonville Suns in four games.

=== Playoff bracket ===
Finals
E1	Jacksonville	1
W1	Montgomery	3

== Awards ==
Southern League awards
Award name	Recipient
Most Valuable Player	Jerry Moxey, Columbus Astros
Pitcher of the Year	Doug Konieczny, Columbus Astros
Manager of the Year	Billy Gardner, Jacksonville Suns

== See also ==
- 1973 Major League Baseball season
