= 1981 Southern League season =

- League: Southern League
- Sport: Baseball
- Duration: April 9 – September 1
- Number of games: 144
- Number of teams: 10

Regular season
- League champions: Nashville Sounds
- Season MVP: Tim Laudner, Orlando Twins

Playoffs
- League champions: Orlando Twins
- Runners-up: Nashville Sounds

SL seasons
- ← 1980 1982 →

The 1981 Southern League was a Class AA baseball season played between April 9 and September 1. Ten teams played a 144-game schedule, with the top team in each division in each half of the season qualifying for the post-season.

The Orlando Twins won the Southern League championship, as they defeated the Nashville Sounds in the playoffs.

== Team changes ==
- The Montgomery Rebels relocated to Birmingham, Alabama and were renamed to the Birmingham Barons. The club remained affiliated with the Detroit Tigers.

== Teams ==
1981 Southern League
| Division | Team | City | MLB Affiliate | Stadium |
| East | Charlotte Orioles | Charlotte, North Carolina | Baltimore Orioles | Jim Crockett Memorial Park |
| East | Columbus Astros | Columbus, Georgia | Houston Astros | Golden Park |
| East | Jacksonville Suns | Jacksonville, Florida | Kansas City Royals | Wolfson Park |
| East | Orlando Twins | Orlando, Florida | Minnesota Twins | Tinker Field |
| East | Savannah Braves | Savannah, Georgia | Atlanta Braves | Grayson Stadium |
| West | Birmingham Barons | Birmingham, Alabama | Detroit Tigers | Rickwood Field |
| West | Chattanooga Lookouts | Chattanooga, Tennessee | Cleveland Indians | Engel Stadium |
| West | Knoxville Blue Jays | Knoxville, Tennessee | Toronto Blue Jays | Bill Meyer Stadium |
| West | Memphis Chicks | Memphis, Tennessee | Montreal Expos | Tim McCarver Stadium |
| West | Nashville Sounds | Nashville, Tennessee | New York Yankees | Herschel Greer Stadium |

== Map of teams ==
East Division West Division

== Regular season ==
=== Summary ===
- The Nashville Sounds finished the season with the best record in the league for the second consecutive season.

=== Standings ===
East Division
| Team | Win | Loss | % | GB |
|---|---|---|---|---|
| Orlando Twins | 79 | 63 | .556 | – |
| Charlotte Orioles | 74 | 69 | .517 | 5.5 |
| Savannah Braves | 70 | 70 | .500 | 8 |
| Jacksonville Suns | 65 | 77 | .458 | 14 |
| Columbus Astros | 63 | 78 | .447 | 15.5 |
West Division
| Nashville Sounds | 81 | 62 | .566 | – |
| Memphis Chicks | 77 | 66 | .538 | 4 |
| Birmingham Barons | 71 | 70 | .504 | 9 |
| Chattanooga Lookouts | 67 | 75 | .472 | 13.5 |
| Knoxville Blue Jays | 63 | 80 | .441 | 18 |

== League Leaders ==
=== Batting leaders ===
| Stat | Player | Total |
|---|---|---|
| AVG | Kevin Rhomberg, Chattanooga Lookouts | .366 |
| H | Kevin Rhomberg, Chattanooga Lookouts | 187 |
| R | Ted Wilborn, Nashville Sounds | 106 |
| 2B | Don Mattingly, Nashville Sounds | 35 |
| 3B | Kevin Rhomberg, Chattanooga Lookouts | 14 |
| HR | Tim Laudner, Orlando Twins | 42 |
| RBI | Larry Ray, Columbus Astros | 107 |
| SB | Kevin Rhomberg, Chattanooga Lookouts | 74 |

=== Pitching leaders ===
| Stat | Player | Total |
|---|---|---|
| W | Craig McMurtry, Savannah Braves | 15 |
| ERA | Jamie Werly, Nashville Sounds | 2.59 |
| CG | Jamie Werly, Nashville Sounds | 18 |
| SHO | Keith Creel, Jacksonville Suns | 4 |
| SV | Tom Gorman, Memphis Chicks; Mark Ross, Columbus Astros | 22 |
| IP | Jamie Werly, Nashville Sounds | 222.0 |
| SO | Jamie Werly, Nashville Sounds | 193 |

== Playoffs ==
- The Orlando Twins won their first Southern League championship, defeating the Nashville Sounds in four games.

=== Playoff bracket ===
Division finals
E1 | Orlando | 3
E2 | Savannah | 1
W1 | Nashville | 3
W2 | Memphis | 0

Finals
E1 | Orlando | 3
W1 | Nashville | 1

== Awards ==
Southern League awards
| Award name | Recipient |
|---|---|
| Most Valuable Player | Tim Laudner, Orlando Twins |
| Pitcher of the Year | Jamie Werly, Nashville Sounds |
| Manager of the Year | Tom Kelly, Orlando Twins |

== See also ==
- 1981 Major League Baseball season
