= Dixie Association =

1971 Dixie Association season
- League: Southern League; Texas League
- Sport: Baseball
- Duration: April 13 – September 6
- Games: 142
- Teams: 14

Regular season
- League champions: Charlotte Hornets

Playoffs
- League champions: Charlotte Hornets
- Runners-up: Arkansas Travelers

The 1971 Dixie Association was a Class AA baseball season played between April 13 and September 6. Fourteen teams played a 142-game schedule, with four teams qualifying for the post-season.

The Charlotte Hornets won the Dixie Association championship, defeating the Arkansas Travelers in the final round of the playoffs.

== League changes ==
The Dixie Association was an interleague partnership between the Texas League (TL) and the Southern League (SL) Double-A leagues of Minor League Baseball in 1971. The two leagues played an interlocking schedule. The partnership was dissolved after the season.

Each league consisted of seven teams who were divided among the association's three divisions. The West Division was composed of four TL teams. The Central Division had three TL teams and one SL team. The East Division consisted of six SL teams. At the end of the season, the two top teams from the SL competed for the Southern League championship—the Charlotte Hornets defeated the Asheville Tourists, 2–1. The TL winners of the Central and West Divisions met for the Texas League championship—the Arkansas Travelers defeated the Amarillo Giants, 2–0. The individual league champions then competed for the Dixie Association championship—Charlotte defeated Arkansas, 3–0.

== Team changes ==
=== Southern League teams ===
- The Asheville Tourists join the league from the Southern League. The club ended their affiliation with the Cincinnati Reds and began a new affiliation with the Chicago White Sox. The club will play in the East Division.
- The Birmingham Athletics join the league from the Southern League. The club will play in the Central Division.
- The Charlotte Hornets join the league from the Southern League. The club will play in the East Division.
- The Columbus Astros join the league from the Southern League. The club will play in the East Division.
- The Jacksonville Suns join the league from the Southern League. The club ended their affiliations with the Milwaukee Brewers and Montreal Expos and began a new affiliation with the Cleveland Indians. The club will play in the East Division.
- The Mobile White Sox fold.
- The Montgomery Rebels join the league from the Southern League. The club will play in the East Division.
- The Savannah Indians join the league from the Southern League. The club ended their affiliation with the Cleveland Indians and began a new affiliation with the Atlanta Braves. The team was renamed to the Savannah Braves. The club will play in the East Division.

=== Texas League teams ===
- The Arkansas Travelers join the league from the Texas League. The club will play in the East Division.
- The Amarillo Giants join the league from the Texas League. The club will play in the West Division.
- The Albuquerque Dodgers join the league from the Texas League. The club will play in the West Division.
- The Dallas-Fort Worth Spurs join the league from the Texas League. The club will play in the West Division.
- The El Paso Sun Kings took a leave of absence in 1971.
- The Memphis Blues join the league from the Texas League. The club will play in the East Division.
- The San Antonio Missions join the league from the Texas League. The club will play in the West Division.
- The Shreveport Captains join the league from the Texas League. The club will play in the East Division. The club ended their affiliation with the Atlanta Braves and began a new affiliation with the California Angels.

== Teams ==
1971 Dixie Association
Division	Team	City	MLB Affiliate	Stadium
East	Asheville Tourists	Asheville, North Carolina	Chicago White Sox	McCormick Field
East	Charlotte Hornets	Charlotte, North Carolina	Minnesota Twins	Clark Griffith Park
East	Columbus Astros	Columbus, Georgia	Houston Astros	Golden Park
East	Jacksonville Suns	Jacksonville, Florida	Cleveland Indians	Wolfson Park
East	Montgomery Rebels	Montgomery, Alabama	Detroit Tigers	Paterson Field
East	Savannah Braves	Savannah, Georgia	Atlanta Braves	Grayson Stadium
Central	Arkansas Travelers	Little Rock, Arkansas	St. Louis Cardinals	Ray Winder Field
Central	Birmingham Athletics	Birmingham, Alabama	Oakland Athletics	Rickwood Field
Central	Memphis Blues	Memphis, Tennessee	New York Mets	Blues Stadium
Central	Shreveport Captains	Shreveport, Louisiana	California Angels	SPAR Stadium
West	Albuquerque Dodgers	Albuquerque, New Mexico	Los Angeles Dodgers	Albuquerque Sports Stadium
West	Amarillo Giants	Amarillo, Texas	San Francisco Giants	Potter County Memorial Stadium
West	Dallas-Fort Worth Spurs	Arlington, Texas	Baltimore Orioles	Turnpike Stadium
West	San Antonio Missions	San Antonio, Texas	Chicago Cubs	V. J. Keefe Memorial Stadium

== Map of teams ==
East Division Central Division West Division

== Regular season ==
=== Summary ===
- The Charlotte Hornets finished the season with the best record in the league.

=== Standings ===
East Division
Team	Win	Loss	%	GB
Charlotte Hornets	92	50	.648	–
Asheville Tourists	90	51	.638	1.5
Montgomery Rebels	73	69	.514	19
Jacksonville Suns	63	77	.450	28
Savannah Braves	57	84	.404	34.5
Columbus Astros	51	91	.359	41
Central Division
Arkansas Travelers	75	64	.540	–
Memphis Blues	69	70	.496	6
Shreveport Captains	69	73	.486	7.5
Birmingham Athletics	48	93	.340	28
West Division
Amarillo Giants	88	54	.620	–
Dallas-Fort Worth Spurs	82	59	.582	5.5
Albuquerque Dodgers	67	75	.472	21
San Antonio Missions	63	77	.450	24

== League Leaders ==
=== Batting leaders ===
Stat	Player	Total
AVG	Minnie Mendoza, Charlotte Hornets	.316
H	Minnie Mendoza, Charlotte Hornets	163
R	Ken Hottman, Asheville Tourists	99
2B	Gary Matthews, Amarillo Giants	37
3B	Leon Brown, Dallas-Fort Worth Spurs	10
HR	Ken Hottman, Asheville Tourists	37
RBI	Ken Hottman, Asheville Tourists	116
SB	Bill North, San Antonio Missions	47

=== Pitching leaders ===
Stat	Player	Total
W	Wayne Garland, Dallas-Fort Worth Spurs	19
ERA	Wayne Garland, Dallas-Fort Worth Spurs	1.71
CG	Wayne Garland, Dallas-Fort Worth Spurs	20
SHO	Wayne Garland, Dallas-Fort Worth Spurs; Gary Ryerson, Amarillo Giants	6
SV	Jack Whillock, Montgomery Rebels	15
IP	Wes Scott, Amarillo Giants	221.0
SO	Chris Floethe, Birmingham Athletics	225

== Playoffs ==
- The semi-finals are a best-of-three series.
- The finals are a best-of-five series.
- The Charlotte Hornets won the Dixie Association championship, defeating the Arkansas Travelers in three games.

=== Playoff bracket ===
Semi-finals
E1	Charlotte	2
E2	Asheville	1
W1	Amarillo	0
C1	Arkansas	2

Finals
E1	Charlotte	3
C1	Arkansas	0

== See also ==
- 1971 Major League Baseball season
