= List of Southern League champions =

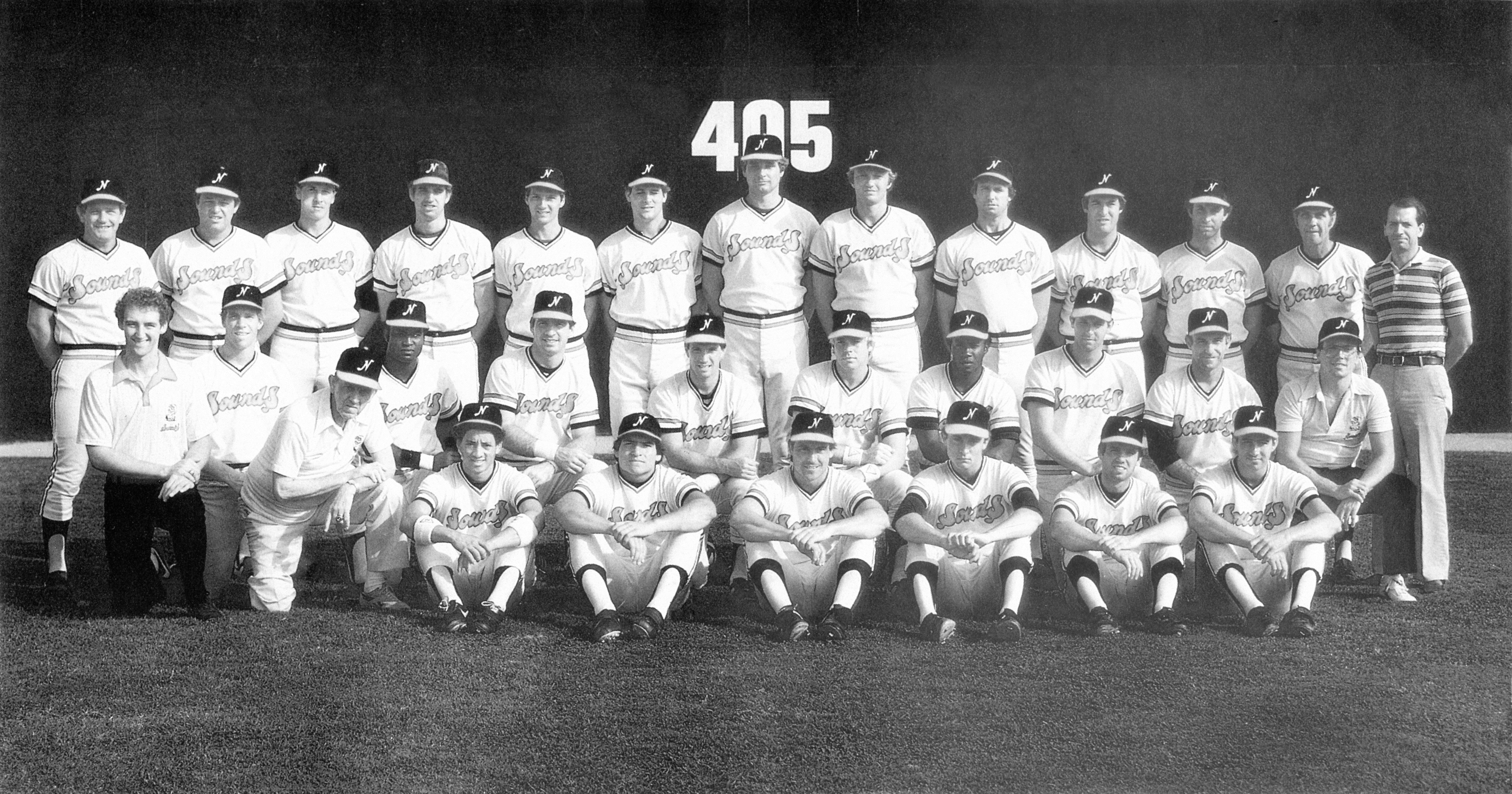
The 1982 Southern League champion Nashville Sounds

The Southern League (SL) is a Minor League Baseball league that operates in the United States at the Double-A level, which is two grades below Major League Baseball. A champion has been determined at the end of each season since the league was formed in 1964.

Through 1970, champions were the regular-season pennant winners—the team with the best win–loss record at the conclusion of the regular season. The 1971 title was decided in a postseason series between the two teams with the best records. From 1972 to 1975, the winners of each of two divisions competed in a series to determine champions. The league operated using a split season format from 1976 to 2020. Under this format, the winners of each half within each division played for the division championship, and the division winners met to play for the SL title. The 2021 winner was crowned via a series between the two teams with the best full-season records. As of 2022, the winners of each division from both the first and second halves of the season meet in a best-of-three division series, with the winners of the two division series meeting in a best-of-three championship series.

The Birmingham Barons have won nine Southern League championships, more than any other team, followed by the Jacksonville Suns (6) and Montgomery Rebels (5). Among active SL franchises, Birmingham has won nine championships, the most of all teams, followed by the Knoxville Smokies (4) and Chattanooga Lookouts (3).

== History ==
The Southern League was founded in 1964. A league champion has been determined at the end of each season. Champions from 1964 to 1970 were simply the regular-season pennant winners—the team with the best win–loss record at the conclusion of the regular championship season. The first league champions were the Lynchburg White Sox, who won by one game over the Birmingham Barons in 1964.

In 1971, the league merged with the Texas League to form the Dixie Association, an interleague partnership in which they played an interlocking schedule, and the leagues' champions met to determine a Dixie Association champion. The Southern League championship was determined via a best-of-three playoff series between the top two teams in the league, based on winning percentage. The top-seeded Charlotte Hornets defeated the Asheville Tourists, 2–1. Charlotte then won the Dixie Association title over the Texas League champion Arkansas Travelers, in three-straight games. The partnership was dissolved after the season.

The Southern League divided its teams into two divisions in 1972. From 1972 to 1975, the winners of each division met in a best-of-five series to determine a champion. In 1976, the circuit adopted a split season format while maintaining its divisional alignment. Under this arrangement, the schedule was split into two parts. The team with the best record in each division at the end of the first half won the first-half division title. Standings were then reset so that all clubs had clean records to begin the second half. Second-half division titles were decided in the same manner. Then, the first and second-half winners in each division met to determine division champions. These winners played for the Southern League championship.

The first four-team playoff, held in 1976, was won by the Western Division champion Montgomery Rebels over the Eastern Division champion Orlando Twins, 3–1. The 1976 playoffs featured a one-game semifinal divisional round and a best-of-five championship series. Both rounds were the best-of-three in 1977 and 1978. The 1979 playoffs had a best-of-three divisional round and a best-of-five final. From 1980 to 2020, both rounds were the best-of-five. Initially, if one team won both halves, they received a bye into the championship round. Beginning in 1982, the team in that division with the second-place full-season record was awarded a wild card berth and became the division champion's opponent.

The 2020 season was cancelled due to the COVID-19 pandemic. The Southern League ceased operations before the 2021 season in conjunction with Major League Baseball's (MLB) reorganization of Minor League Baseball. In place of the league, MLB created the Double-A South. Prior to the 2022 season, MLB renamed the Double-A South the Southern League, and it carried on the history of the circuit prior to reorganization. In 2021, the Double-A South held a best-of-five series between the two teams with the best records, regardless of division standings, to determine a league champion. The top-seeded Mississippi Braves bested the Montgomery Biscuits, 3–2, for the title.

In 2022, the Southern League returned to the split-season divisional format it has used for the majority of its existence. The winners of each half in a division vie for the division championship. The second-place overall team is awarded a wild card berth in the event the same team wins both halves. The division champions then compete for the Southern League championship. Both rounds are the best-of-three games.

== Champions ==
=== Pre-playoff champions (1964–1970) ===
Key
Record	Regular-season win–loss record
GA	Games ahead of the second-place team

Champions
Year	Champion	Record	GA	Runner-up	Ref.
1964	Lynchburg White Sox	81–59	1	Birmingham Barons	
1965	Columbus Confederate Yankees	79–59	— (Note: Columbus won the championship with a winning percentage of .572 (79–59) versus Asheville's .571 (80–60).)	Asheville Tourists	
1966	Mobile Athletics	88–52	9 1/2	Asheville Tourists	
1967	Birmingham A's	84–55	3 1/2	Montgomery Rebels	
1968	Asheville Tourists	86–54	4 1/2	Montgomery Rebels	
1969	Charlotte Hornets	81–59	3	Birmingham A's	
1970	Columbus Astros	78–59	— (Note: Columbus won the championship with a winning percentage of .569 (78–59) versus Montgomery's .568 (79–60).)	Montgomery Rebels	

=== Playoff champions (1971–present) ===
Key
Score	Score of the championship series
*	Co-champions
P	Regular-season pennant winner
E	East Division winner
W	West Division winner
12	Won both the first and second half of the split season
WC	Wild card qualifier

Champions
Year	Champion	Score	Runner-up	Other playoff teams	Ref.
1971	Charlotte Hornets^{P}	2–1	Asheville Tourists	—	
1972	Montgomery Rebels^{W}	3–0	Asheville Orioles^{E}	—	
1973	Montgomery Rebels^{W}	3–1	Jacksonville Suns^{E}	—	
1974	Knoxville Sox^{W}	3–2	Jacksonville Suns^{E}	—	
1975	Montgomery Rebels^{W}	3–0	Orlando Twins^{E}	—	
1976	Montgomery Rebels	3–1	Orlando Twins	Charlotte O's & Chattanooga Lookouts	
1977	Montgomery Rebels^{12}	2–0	Jacksonville Suns	Savannah Braves	
1978	Knoxville Sox^{12}	2–1	Savannah Braves	Orlando Twins	
1979	Nashville Sounds	3–1	Columbus Astros	Charlotte O's & Memphis Chicks	
1980	Charlotte O's	3–1	Memphis Chicks	Nashville Sounds & Savannah Braves	
1981	Orlando Twins	3–1	Nashville Sounds	Memphis Chicks & Savannah Braves	
1982	Nashville Sounds	3–1	Jacksonville Suns^{12}	Columbus Astros^{WC} & Knoxville Blue Jays	
1983	Birmingham Barons	3–1	Jacksonville Suns	Nashville Sounds & Savannah Braves	
1984	Charlotte O's	3–0	Knoxville Blue Jays	Greenville Braves & Nashville Sounds	
1985	Huntsville Stars	3–2	Charlotte O's	Columbus Astros & Knoxville Blue Jays	
1986	Columbus Astros	3–2	Huntsville Stars	Jacksonville Expos & Knoxville Blue Jays	
1987	Birmingham Barons	3–1	Charlotte O's	Huntsville Stars & Jacksonville Expos	
1988	Chattanooga Lookouts	3–0	Greenville Braves^{12}	Jacksonville Expos^{WC} & Memphis Chicks	
1989	Birmingham Barons	3–0	Greenville Braves	Huntsville Stars & Orlando Twins	
1990	Memphis Chicks	3–2	Orlando SunRays	Birmingham Barons & Jacksonville Expos	
1991	Orlando SunRays	3–1	Birmingham Barons	Greenville Braves & Knoxville Blue Jays	
1992	Greenville Braves^{12}	3–2	Chattanooga Lookouts^{12}	Charlotte Knights^{WC} & Huntsville Stars^{WC}	
1993	Birmingham Barons	3–1	Knoxville Smokies	Greenville Braves & Nashville Xpress	
1994	Huntsville Stars	3–1	Carolina Mudcats	Chattanooga Lookouts & Greenville Braves	
1995	Carolina Mudcats^{12}	3–2	Chattanooga Lookouts	Memphis Chicks & Orlando Cubs^{WC}	
1996	Jacksonville Suns^{12}	3–1	Chattanooga Lookouts	Carolina Mudcats^{WC} & Memphis Chicks	
1997	Greenville Braves	3–2	Huntsville Stars	Knoxville Smokies & Mobile BayBears	
1998	Mobile BayBears^{12}	3–1	Jacksonville Suns	Huntsville Stars^{WC} & Knoxville Smokies	
1999	Orlando Rays	3–1	West Tenn Diamond Jaxx^{12}	Chattanooga Lookouts^{WC} & Knoxville Smokies	
2000	West Tenn Diamond Jaxx	3–2	Jacksonville Suns	Birmingham Barons & Greenville Braves	
2001*	Huntsville Stars	— (Note: Huntsville and Jacksonville were declared co-champions after the playoffs were cancelled in the wake of the September 11 terrorist attacks.)	—	Birmingham Barons & Chattanooga Lookouts^{WC}	
2001*	Jacksonville Suns^{12}	—	—	Birmingham Barons & Chattanooga Lookouts^{WC}	
2002	Birmingham Barons	3–0	Jacksonville Suns	Carolina Mudcats & West Tenn Diamond Jaxx	
2003	Carolina Mudcats^{12}	3–2	Huntsville Stars	Birmingham Barons & Tennessee Smokies^{WC}	
2004*	Mobile BayBears	— (Note: Mobile and Tennessee were declared co-champions after the playoffs were cancelled due to the threat of Hurricane Ivan.)	—	Birmingham Barons & Chattanooga Lookouts	
2004*	Tennessee Smokies	—	—	Birmingham Barons & Chattanooga Lookouts	
2005	Jacksonville Suns	3–1	West Tenn Diamond Jaxx^{12}	Birmingham Barons & Carolina Mudcats^{WC}	
2006	Montgomery Biscuits	3–1	Huntsville Stars	Chattanooga Lookouts & Jacksonville Suns	
2007	Montgomery Biscuits	3–2	Huntsville Stars^{12}	Mississippi Braves & Tennessee Smokies^{WC}	
2008	Mississippi Braves	3–2	Carolina Mudcats	Birmingham Barons & West Tenn Diamond Jaxx	
2009	Jacksonville Suns	3–1	Tennessee Smokies	Birmingham Barons & Huntsville Stars	
2010	Jacksonville Suns^{12}	3–1	Tennessee Smokies^{12}	Mobile BayBears^{WC} & West Tenn Diamond Jaxx^{WC}	
2011	Mobile BayBears	3–1	Tennessee Smokies	Birmingham Barons & Chattanooga Lookouts	
2012	Mobile BayBears	3–1	Jackson Generals	Chattanooga Lookouts & Montgomery Biscuits	
2013	Birmingham Barons	3–2	Mobile BayBears^{12}	Mississippi Braves^{WC} & Tennessee Smokies	
2014	Jacksonville Suns	3–0	Chattanooga Lookouts	Huntsville Stars & Mobile BayBears	
2015	Chattanooga Lookouts	3–2	Biloxi Shuckers	Montgomery Biscuits & Pensacola Blue Wahoos	
2016	Jackson Generals	3–0	Mississippi Braves^{WC}	Montgomery Biscuits & Pensacola Blue Wahoos^{12}	
2017*	Chattanooga Lookouts^{12}	— (Note: Chattanooga and Pensacola were declared co-champions after the playoffs were cancelled due to the threat of Hurricane Irma.)	—	Jacksonville Jumbo Shrimp & Montgomery Biscuits^{WC}	
2017*	Pensacola Blue Wahoos	—	—	Jacksonville Jumbo Shrimp & Montgomery Biscuits^{WC}	
2018	Jackson Generals	3–1	Biloxi Shuckers^{12}	Montgomery Biscuits & Pensacola Blue Wahoos^{WC}	
2019	Jackson Generals^{WC}	3–2	Biloxi Shuckers^{12}	Montgomery Biscuits^{12} & Pensacola Blue Wahoos^{WC}	
2020	None (season cancelled due to COVID-19 pandemic)				
2021	Mississippi Braves^{P}	3–2	Montgomery Biscuits	—	
2022	Pensacola Blue Wahoos^{1}	2–1	Tennessee Smokies^{WC}	Montgomery Biscuits^{2} & Rocket City Trash Pandas^{12}	
2023	Tennessee Smokies^{2}	2–0	Pensacola Blue Wahoos^{1}	Chattanooga Lookouts^{1} & Montgomery Biscuits^{2}	
2024	Birmingham Barons^{1}	2–0	Montgomery Biscuits^{12}	Biloxi Shuckers^{WC} & Tennessee Smokies^{2}	
2025	Birmingham Barons^{2}	2–1	Montgomery Biscuits^{2}	Biloxi Shuckers^{1} & Chattanooga Lookouts^{1}	
2026	Rocket City Trash Pandas^{2}	2–1	Biloxi Shuckers^{1}	Knoxville Smokies^{1} & Pensacola Blue Wahoos^{2}	

== Wins by team ==
Active Southern League teams appear in bold.

Team	Wins	Year(s)
**Birmingham Barons** (Birmingham A's)	9	1967, 1983, 1987, 1989, 1993, 2002, 2013, 2024, 2025
Jacksonville Suns	6	1996, 2001, 2005, 2009, 2010, 2014
Montgomery Rebels	5	1972, 1973, 1975, 1976, 1977
Jackson Generals (West Tenn Diamond Jaxx)	4	2000, 2016, 2018, 2019
**Knoxville Smokies** (Knoxville Sox/Tennessee Smokies)	4	1974, 1978, 2004, 2023
Mobile BayBears	4	1998, 2004, 2011, 2012
**Chattanooga Lookouts**	3	1988, 2015, 2017
Huntsville Stars	3	1985, 1994, 2001
Orlando Rays (Orlando Twins/SunRays)	3	1981, 1991, 1999
Carolina Mudcats	2	1995, 2003
Charlotte Hornets	2	1969, 1971
Charlotte O's	2	1980, 1984
Columbus Astros	2	1970, 1986
Greenville Braves	2	1992, 1997
Mississippi Braves	2	2008, 2021
**Montgomery Biscuits**	2	2006, 2007
Nashville Sounds	2	1979, 1982
**Pensacola Blue Wahoos**	2	2017, 2022
Asheville Tourists	1	1968
Columbus Confederate Yankees	1	1965
Lynchburg White Sox	1	1964
Memphis Chicks	1	1990
Mobile Athletics	1	1966
**Rocket City Trash Pandas**	1	2026
