= Stefan Wever =

German baseball player (1958–2022)

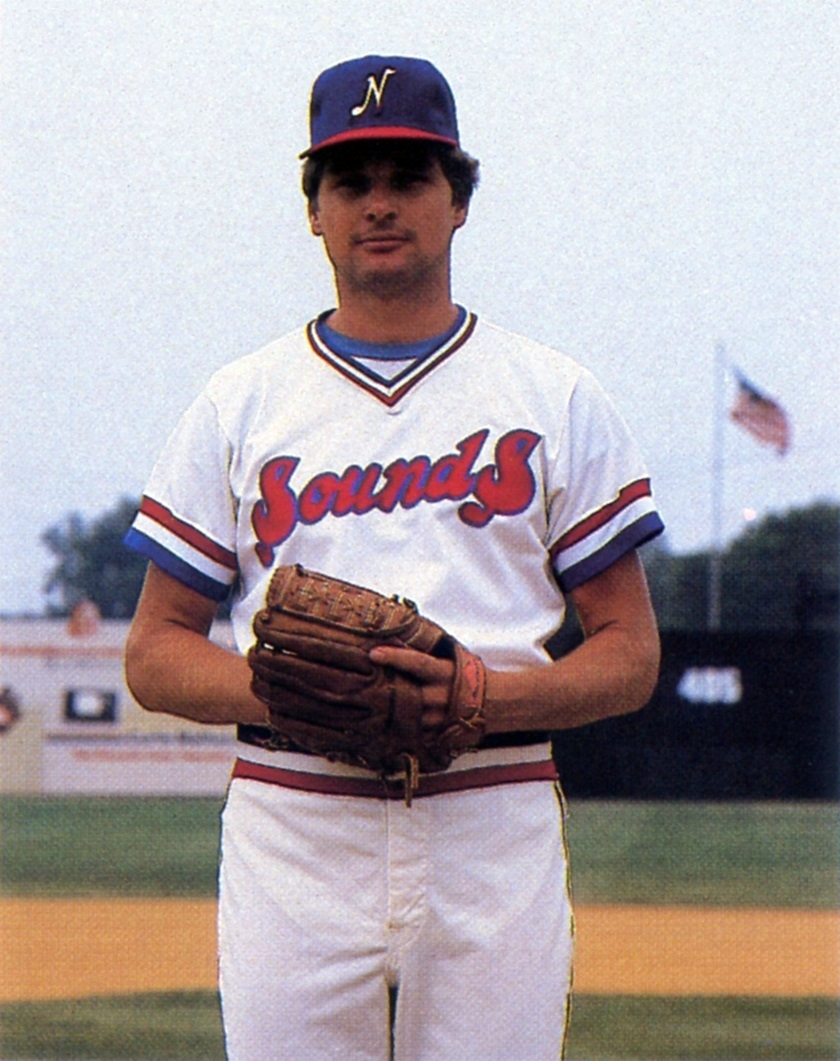
- Wever with the Nashville Sounds in 1982
- Pitcher
- Born: April 22, 1958; Marburg, Hesse, West Germany
- Died: December 27, 2022 (aged 64); Portland, Oregon, U.S.
- Batted: Right Threw: Right

MLB debut
- September 17, 1982, for the New York Yankees

Last MLB appearance
- September 17, 1982, for the New York Yankees

MLB statistics
- Win–loss record: 0–1
- Earned run average: 27.00
- Strikeouts: 2
- Stats at Baseball Reference

Teams
- New York Yankees (1982)

Stefan Matthew Wever (April 22, 1958 – December 27, 2022) was a German-born American professional baseball pitcher, who played a single Major League Baseball game with the New York Yankees in 1982, recording the loss, a 27.00 earned run average (ERA), and two strikeouts in that game.

Born in West Germany, Wever moved to the United States as a child and began playing baseball. He played in high school and the University of California, Santa Barbara, which led to him being drafted by the New York Yankees. After four seasons in the minor leagues, Wever made his major league debut on September 17, 1982. In his debut, he suffered a shoulder injury, which he tried to pitch through for two years before having surgery in 1984. He tried to come back from the injury in 1985 but retired. After retiring, he opened a bar in San Francisco, which he continued to run.

== Early life and education ==
Wever was born in Marburg, West Germany, in 1958. He immigrated to the United States with his mother and twin sister at six and lived in Boston until he was 12 when he moved to San Francisco. He attended Lowell High School, where he played on the school's baseball team. During his senior year, Wever helped lead the Lowell Cardinals to the city championship game, and he graduated in 1976.

After graduating from high school, Wever was not looked at by college recruiters due to a lack of competition he faced. As a result, he attended the University of California, Santa Barbara on an academic scholarship, and walked on to the school's baseball team. In three seasons with the Santa Barbara Gauchos, he had 18 wins, 17 losses, 199 strikeouts, and 15 complete games; the losses and complete games were at that time school records. After his junior year, Wever was drafted by the New York Yankees in the sixth round of the 1979 Major League Baseball draft. He was given a signing bonus of $16,000, and officially signed with the team shortly after the draft concluded.

== Career ==
Wever began his professional career in 1979 with the Oneonta Yankees of the New York–Penn League (NYPL). He pitched in ten games for the team, finishing the season with a 6–3 record, a 1.77 earned run average (ERA), and 70 strikeouts. In the Yankees' championship series against the Geneva Cubs, he pitched a shutout and threw nine strikeouts to win the first game and help the Yankees win the NYPL Championship. The following year, Wever was promoted to the Fort Lauderdale Yankees of the Florida State League. That year, he had a 7–3 record, a 3.64 ERA and 94 innings pitched in 15 games.

In 1981, Wever began the season remaining with Fort Lauderdale. He had a 7–3 record and a 2.00 ERA in 12 games before being promoted to the Nashville Sounds of the Southern League, the Yankees' AA affiliate. With Nashville, he had a 5–2 record and 2.05 ERA in nine appearances. Wever's pitching coach in Nashville was Hall of Famer Hoyt Wilhelm. Wilhelm felt he had the ability but not the confidence to pitch in the majors, and spent his time in Nashville working on that aspect of Wever's game. The following season, Weber was almost unanimously named to the Southern League All-Star team, thanks to 11 wins and 116 strikeouts through the end of June. He improved to a 16–6 record, a 2.78 ERA, and 191 strikeouts, won the Southern League Most Outstanding Pitcher Award, and accomplished the pitcher's Triple Crown, leading the league in wins, ERA, and strikeouts. He led Nashville to the Southern League championship, and right after doing so, the Yankees called Wever up to the major leagues.

His first and only major league appearance came against the Milwaukee Brewers on September 17, 1982. The first two batters he faced were Paul Molitor and Robin Yount, both future Hall of Famers. The fourth batter he faced was Ted Simmons, also a future Hall of Famer. Partway through the first inning, he felt a twinge in his shoulder; not wanting to leave his first game early, he pitched through it and allowed five runs in the first. Partway through the third, after three more runs allowed, Wever was taken out of the game. He pitched for 2 2/3 innings and had eight earned runs, two strikeouts, and three wild pitches. Entering the 1983 season, Wever was projected to be the fifth starter in the Yankees' starting rotation. Because of continued pain in his shoulder, he instead spent the season with the AAA Columbus Clippers, where he went 1–4 with a 9.78 ERA in seven appearances.

Wever spent 1984 with Fort Lauderdale, where he went 1–3 in seven games. After the seven games, he visited Dr. James Andrews, who diagnosed the twinge he suffered two years earlier as a torn rotator cuff and torn labrum; it explained why he had been throwing 85 mph since the injury, compared to 95 mph beforehand. He had surgery shortly afterward and spent the rest of the year rehabbing the injury. He attempted a comeback in 1985 with the Albany-Colonie Yankees and had a 4.91 ERA in five games with the team. In June, having continued to pitch through shoulder pain, Wever retired from baseball and ended his professional career.

== Post-playing career ==
After retiring from baseball, Wever returned to school, and earned a bachelor's degree in English literature from the University of California, Berkeley. He married Melinda in 1988, and three years later opened up the Horseshoe Tavern, a bar in San Francisco's Marina District, which he continues to run.

While working at his bar, Wever returned to baseball in a coaching role. He was named varsity baseball coach at Redwood High School in Larkspur, California in 2008, after having volunteered for the freshman team the year before. Wever was forced to resign in 2010 due to a diagnosis of large-cell lymphoma. He went on to continue coaching youth baseball camps and leagues and was bench coach for the San Rafael Pacifics in 2013.

== Personal life and death ==
Wever later spent three days a week feeding the homeless at SF's St. Anthony's Dining Room.

In 2019, Wever moved to Portland, Oregon, to be near his daughter. He continued to volunteer and traveled to San Francisco once a month to continue volunteering at St. Anthony's and to look after his business.

Wever died on December 27, 2022, at the age of 64.
