= Dallas–Fort Worth Spurs =

Dallas-Fort Worth Spurs
- 1965–1971; Arlington, Texas

Minor league affiliations
- Previous classes: AA
- League: Texas League

Major league affiliations
- Previous teams: Baltimore Orioles (1969–1971); Houston Astros (1968); Chicago Cubs (1965–1967)

Minor league titles
- League titles: None

Team data
- Previous names: Spurs
- Previous parks: Turnpike Stadium

The Dallas–Fort Worth Spurs were an American minor league baseball team in the Texas League from 1965–1971. The team played in Turnpike Stadium in Arlington, Texas.

The Spurs were created when the Triple-A Dallas Rangers moved to Vancouver, British Columbia, in 1965. With the opening of Turnpike Stadium, the Double-A Texas League's Fort Worth Cats, an affiliate of the Chicago Cubs, moved into the new venue and adopted the regional Dallas-Fort Worth designation and the Spurs nickname.

The Spurs were affiliated with the Cubs (1965–1967), Houston Astros (1968) and Baltimore Orioles (1969–1971).

As a Cubs' affiliate, the Spurs groomed future Major League players Don Kessinger, Chuck Hartenstein, Joe Niekro, Fred Norman and Bill Stoneman. The club's one season in the Houston organization was lean in terms of prospects, with Fred Stanley and Danny Walton enjoying the longest big-league careers. During their affiliation with Baltimore, the Spurs featured Don Baylor, Bobby Grich, Enos Cabell and Wayne Garland, along with managers Cal Ripken Sr. and Joe Altobelli and batboy Cal Ripken Jr.

The Spurs set many Texas League attendance records, especially after Turnpike Stadium expanded to a capacity of 20,500 in 1970. The Dallas-Fort Worth area was considered a prime location for an expansion team or a re-located franchise. Indeed, Turnpike Stadium had been built specifically to attract a major-league team to the Metroplex. That dream nearly came to fruition when the National League expanded in 1969. But the league instead expanded to Montreal, with the Expos.

Two years later, the struggling Washington Senators received American League permission to transfer to the area in 1972 as the Texas Rangers, who moved into Turnpike Stadium (expanded and renamed Arlington Stadium).

== Yearly record ==
Year	Record	Finish Full Season	Attendance	Manager	Postseason
1965	80–61	Second (East Division)	329,294	Whitey Lockman	DNQ
1966	59–81	Sixth	271,367	Stan Hack; Pete Reiser; Lou Klein	DNQ
1967	62–78	Sixth	246,315	Jo-Jo White	DNQ
1968	60–79	Fourth (East Division)	215,756	Hub Kittle	DNQ
1969	75–58	Second (West Division)	235,827	Joe Altobelli	DNQ
1970	63–73	Third (West Division)	182,743	Joe Altobelli	DNQ
1971	82–59	Second (West Division)	213,249	Cal Ripken Sr.	DNQ

Preceded by Fort Worth Cats	Chicago Cubs; Double-A affiliate 1965–1967	Succeeded by San Antonio Missions
Preceded by Amarillo Sonics	Houston Astros; Double-A affiliate 1968	Succeeded by Savannah Senators
Preceded by Elmira Pioneers	Baltimore Orioles; Double-A affiliate 1969–1971	Succeeded by Asheville Orioles
