= Southern League Manager of the Year Award =

- Sport: Baseball
- League: Southern League
- Awarded for: Best regular-season manager in the Southern League
- Country: United States
- Presented by: Southern League

History
- First award: Joe Sparks (1972)
- Most wins: Andy Green (2); John Shoemaker (2)
- Most recent: Nelson Prada (2025)

The Southern League Manager of the Year Award is an annual award given to the best manager in Minor League Baseball's Southern League based on their regular-season performance as voted on by league managers. Broadcasters, Minor League Baseball executives, and members of the media have previously voted as well. Though the league was established in 1964, the award was not created until 1972. After the cancellation of the 2020 season, the league was known as the Double-A South in 2021 before reverting to the Southern League name in 2022.

Two managers have won the award on multiple occasions. John Shoemaker won in 2001 and 2006, while Andy Green won back-to-back in 2013 and 2014.

Seven managers from the Jacksonville Suns have been selected for the Manager of the Year Award, more than any other team in the league, followed by the Birmingham Barons and Orlando Cubs (5); the Chattanooga Lookouts, Greenville Braves, Huntsville Stars, Knoxville Smokies, and Mobile BayBears (4); the Biloxi Shuckers, Columbus Astros, Jackson Generals, and Montgomery Biscuits (3); the Mississippi Braves and Pensacola Blue Wahoos (2); and the Montgomery Rebels, Nashville Sounds, Rocket City Trash Pandas, and Savannah Braves (1).

Seven managers from the Atlanta Braves Major League Baseball (MLB) organization have won the award, more than any other, followed by the Chicago White Sox organization (6); the Milwaukee Brewers and Minnesota Twins organizations (5); the Chicago Cubs organization (4); the Arizona Diamondbacks, Houston Astros, Oakland Athletics, Tampa Bay Rays, and Washington Nationals organizations (3); the Cincinnati Reds, Detroit Tigers, Kansas City Royals, Los Angeles Dodgers, and Miami Marlins organizations (2); and the Los Angeles Angels, New York Yankees, San Diego Padres, Seattle Mariners, and Toronto Blue Jays organizations (1).

== Winners ==
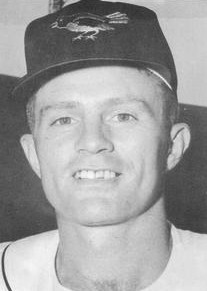
Billy Gardner was the 1973 Southern League Manager of the Year. His son, Billy Gardner Jr., won the award in 2012.

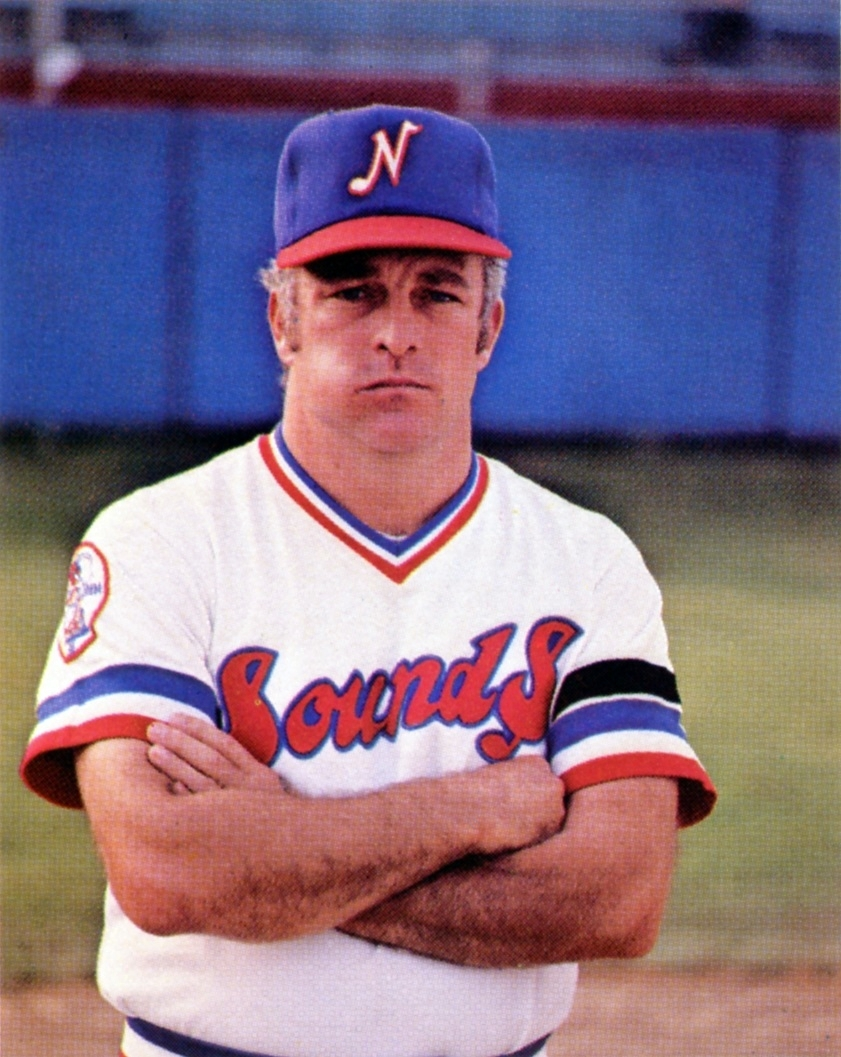
Stump Merrill's 1980 Nashville Sounds were recognized as one of the 100 greatest minor league teams of all time.

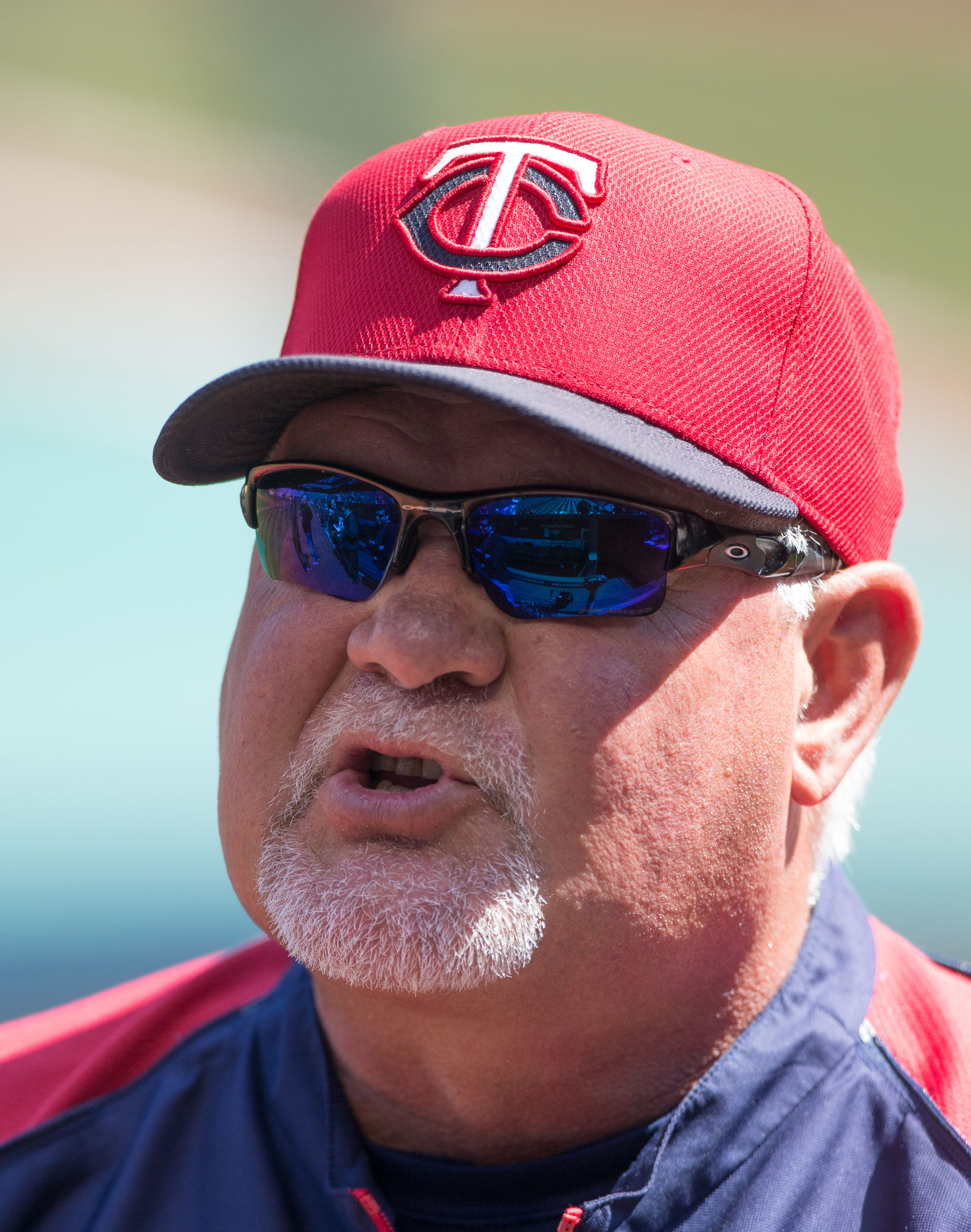
Ron Gardenhire, the 1990 recipient, won the American League Manager of the Year Award in 2010.

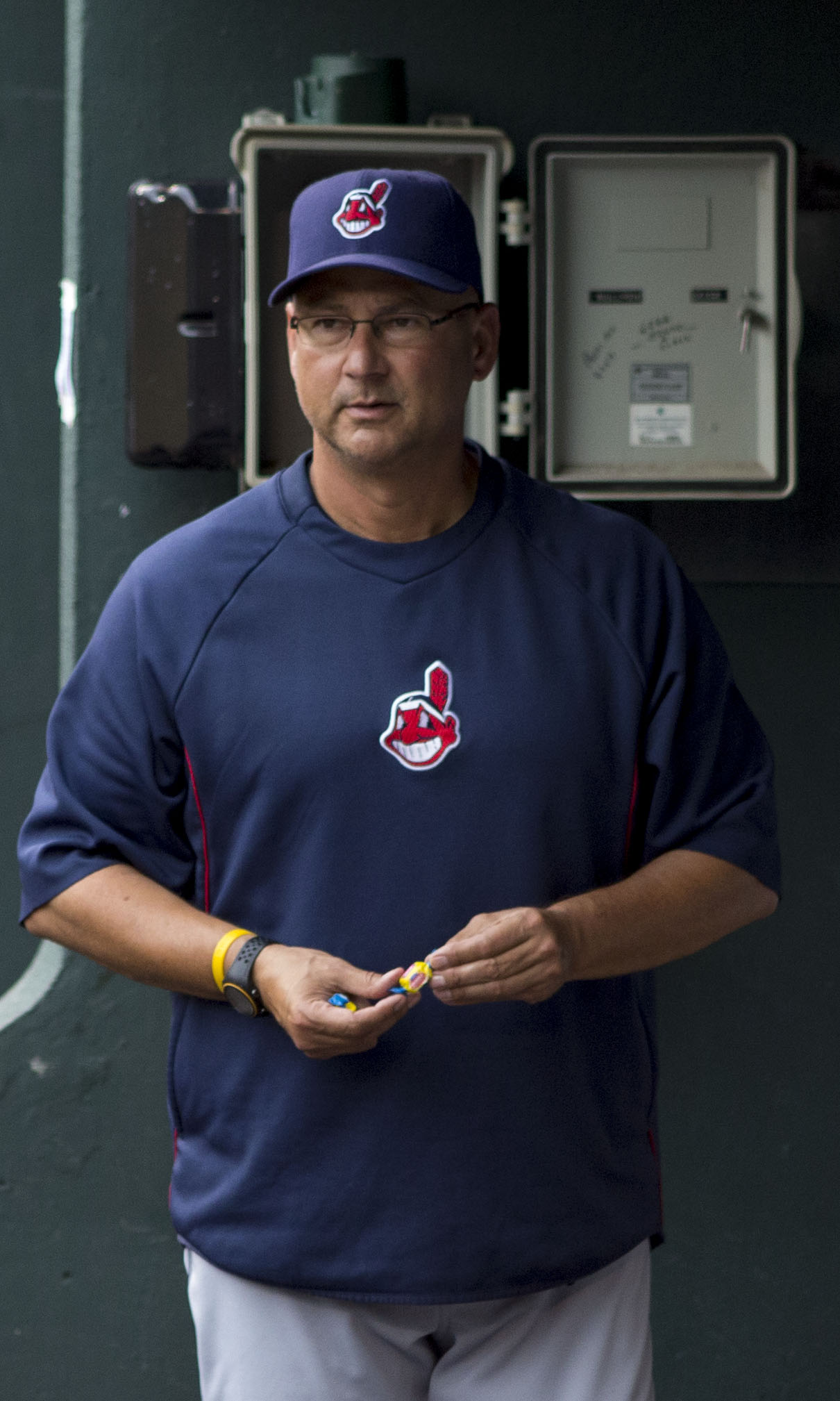
Terry Francona, the 1993 selection, won two American League Manager of the Year Awards (2013 and 2016).

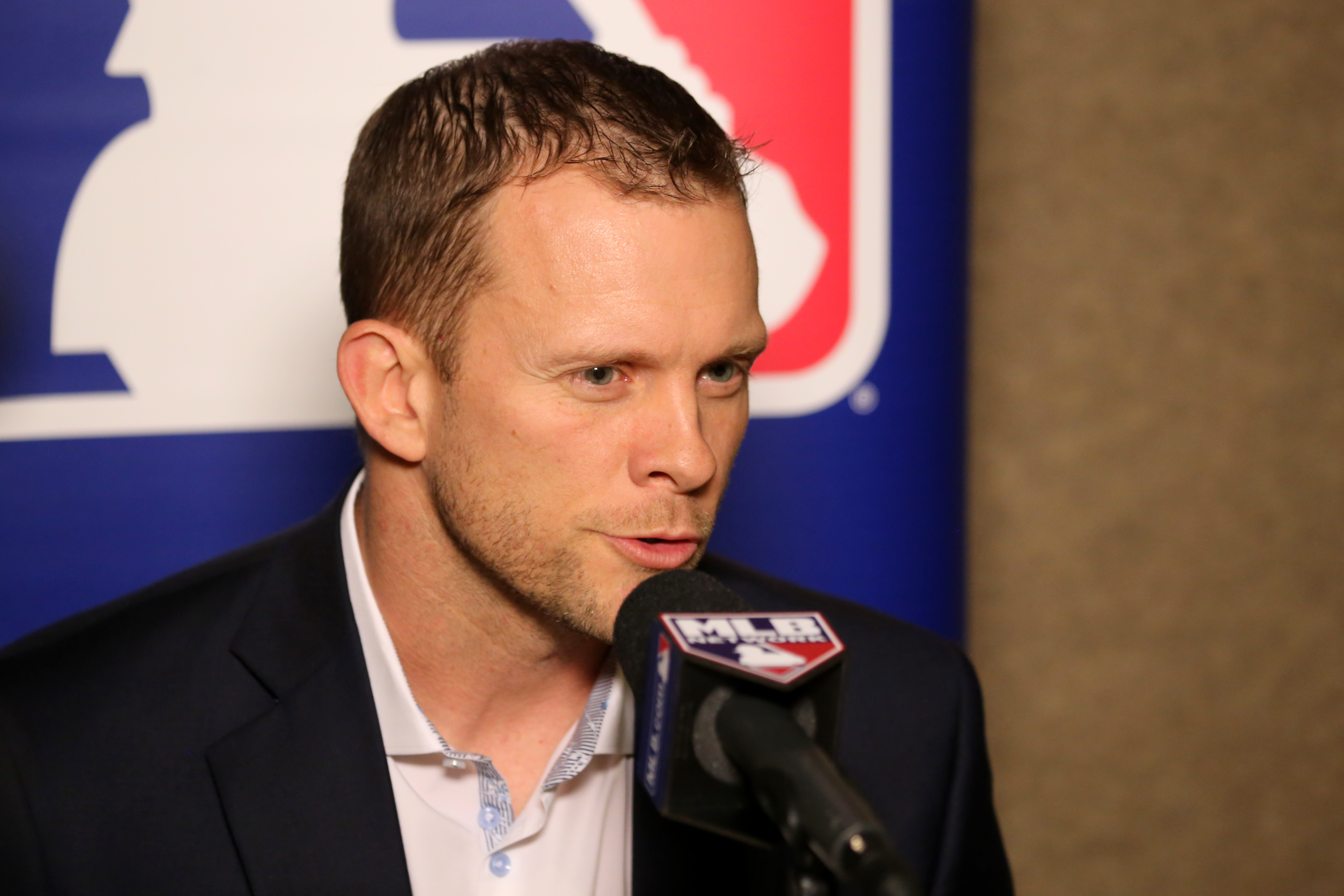
Andy Green won the Manager of the Year Award in back-to-back seasons (2013 and 2014).

Key
| League | The team's final position in the league standings |
| Division | The team's final position in the divisional standings |
| Record | The team's wins and losses during the regular season |
| (#) | Number of wins by managers who won the award multiple times |
| ^ | Indicates multiple award winners in the same year |
| * | Indicates league champions |

Winners
| Year | Winner | Team | Organization | League | Division | Record | Ref(s). |
|---|---|---|---|---|---|---|---|
| 1972 | Joe Sparks | Knoxville Sox | Chicago White Sox | 4th | 2nd | 76–64 | |
| 1973 | Billy Gardner | Jacksonville Suns | Kansas City Royals | 2nd | 1st | 76–60 | |
| 1974 | Jim Napier | Knoxville Sox* | Chicago White Sox | 3rd | 1st | 72–63 | |
| 1975 | Dick Phillips | Orlando Twins | Minnesota Twins | 1st | 1st | 81–57 | |
| 1976 | Rene Lachemann | Chattanooga Lookouts | Oakland Athletics | 4th | 2nd | 70–68 | |
| 1977 | Ed Brinkman | Montgomery Rebels* | Detroit Tigers | 1st | 1st | 86–51 | |
| 1978 | Bobby Dews | Savannah Braves | Atlanta Braves | 4th | 3rd | 72–72 | |
| 1979 | Jimmy Johnson | Columbus Astros | Houston Astros | 1st | 1st | 84–59 | |
| 1980 | Stump Merrill | Nashville Sounds | New York Yankees | 1st | 1st | 97–46 | |
| 1981 | Tom Kelly | Orlando Twins* | Minnesota Twins | 2nd | 1st | 79–63 | |
| 1982 | Gene Lamont | Jacksonville Suns | Kansas City Royals | 1st | 1st | 83–61 | |
| 1983 | Roy Majtyka | Birmingham Barons* | Detroit Tigers | 1st | 1st | 91–54 | |
| 1984^ | Charlie Manuel | Orlando Twins | Minnesota Twins | 2nd | 2nd | 79–65 | |
| 1984^ | Rick Renick | Jacksonville Suns | Montreal Expos | 3rd | 3rd | 76–69 | |
| 1985^ | Carlos Alfonso | Columbus Astros | Houston Astros | 2nd | 1st | 79–65 | |
| 1985^ | John McLaren | Knoxville Blue Jays | Toronto Blue Jays | 1st | 1st | 79–64 | |
| 1986 | Gary Tuck | Columbus Astros* | Houston Astros | 5th | 3rd | 70–70 | |
| 1987 | Tommy Thompson | Jacksonville Expos | Montreal Expos | 1st | 1st | 85–59 | |
| 1988 | Buddy Bailey | Greenville Braves | Atlanta Braves | 1st | 1st | 87–57 | |
| 1989 | Jeff Newman | Huntsville Stars | Oakland Athletics | 2nd | 2nd | 82–61 | |
| 1990^ | Ron Gardenhire | Orlando Sun Rays | Minnesota Twins | 1st | 1st | 85–59 | |
| 1990^ | Jerry Manuel | Jacksonville Expos | Montreal Expos | 2nd | 2nd | 84–60 | |
| 1991 | Chris Chambliss | Greenville Braves | Atlanta Braves | 1st | 1st | 88–56 | |
| 1992 | Grady Little | Greenville Braves* | Atlanta Braves | 1st | 1st | 100–43 | |
| 1993 | Terry Francona | Birmingham Barons* | Chicago White Sox | 1st | 1st | 78–64 | |
| 1994 | Gary Jones | Huntsville Stars* | Oakland Athletics | 1st | 1st | 81–57 | |
| 1995 | Bruce Kimm | Orlando Cubs | Chicago Cubs | 4th | 2nd | 76–67 | |
| 1996 | Mark Berry | Chattanooga Lookouts | Cincinnati Reds | 2nd | 2nd | 81–59 | |
| 1997 | Randy Ingle | Greenville Braves* | Atlanta Braves | 4th | 2nd | 74–66 | |
| 1998 | Mike Ramsey | Mobile BayBears* | San Diego Padres | 1st (tie) | 1st | 86–54 | |
| 1999 | Dave Trembley | West Tenn Diamond Jaxx | Chicago Cubs | 1st | 1st | 84–57 | |
| 2000 | Dave Bialas | West Tenn Diamond Jaxx* | Chicago Cubs | 1st | 1st | 80–58 | |
| 2001 | John Shoemaker (1) | Jacksonville Suns* (Note: Jacksonville and the Huntsville Stars were declared co-champions after the playoffs were cancelled in the wake of the September 11 terrorist attacks.) | Los Angeles Dodgers | 1st | 1st | 83–56 | |
| 2002 | Wally Backman | Birmingham Barons* | Chicago White Sox | 1st | 1st | 79–61 | |
| 2003 | Frank Kremblas | Huntsville Stars | Milwaukee Brewers | 2nd | 1st | 75–63 | |
| 2004 | Jayhawk Owens | Chattanooga Lookouts | Cincinnati Reds | 1st | 1st | 87–53 | |
| 2005 | Razor Shines | Birmingham Barons | Chicago White Sox | 2nd | 1st | 82–57 | |
| 2006 | John Shoemaker (2) | Jacksonville Suns | Los Angeles Dodgers | 1st | 1st | 86–54 | |
| 2007 | Don Money | Huntsville Stars | Milwaukee Brewers | 3rd | 1st | 75–62 | |
| 2008 | Phillip Wellman | Mississippi Braves* | Atlanta Braves | 3rd | 2nd | 73–66 | |
| 2009 | Ever Magallanes | Birmingham Barons | Chicago White Sox | 1st | 1st | 92–47 | |
| 2010 | Bill Dancy | Tennessee Smokies | Chicago Cubs | 1st | 1st | 86–53 | |
| 2011 | Turner Ward | Mobile BayBears* | Arizona Diamondbacks | 1st | 1st | 84–54 | |
| 2012 | Billy Gardner Jr. | Montgomery Biscuits | Tampa Bay Rays | 2nd | 1st | 74–63 | |
| 2013 | Andy Green (1) | Mobile BayBears | Arizona Diamondbacks | 1st | 1st | 79–60 | |
| 2014 | Andy Green (2) | Mobile BayBears | Arizona Diamondbacks | 3rd | 3rd | 79–58 | |
| 2015 | Carlos Subero | Biloxi Shuckers | Milwaukee Brewers | 1st | 1st | 78–59 | |
| 2016 | Daren Brown | Jackson Generals* | Seattle Mariners | 1st | 1st | 84–55 | |
| 2017 | Jake Mauer | Chattanooga Lookouts* (Note: Chattanooga and the Pensacola Blue Wahoos were declared co-champions after the playoffs were cancelled due to Hurricane Irma.) | Minnesota Twins | 1st | 1st | 91–49 | |
| 2018 | Mike Guerrero | Biloxi Shuckers | Milwaukee Brewers | 1st | 1st | 81–59 | |
| 2019 | Morgan Ensberg | Montgomery Biscuits | Tampa Bay Rays | 1st | 1st | 88–50 | |
| 2020 | None selected (season cancelled due to COVID-19 pandemic) | | | | | | |
| 2021 | Dan Meyer | Mississippi Braves* | Atlanta Braves | 1st | 1st | 67–44 | |
| 2022 | Andy Schatzley | Rocket City Trash Pandas | Los Angeles Angels | 1st | 1st | 81–57 | |
| 2023 | Kevin Randle | Pensacola Blue Wahoos | Miami Marlins | 1st | 1st | 79–57 | |
| 2024 | Kevin Bowles | Montgomery Biscuits* | Tampa Bay Rays | 2nd | 1st | 80–57 | |
| 2025 | Joe Ayrault | Biloxi Shuckers | Milwaukee Brewers | 4th | 2nd | 74–64 | |
| 2026 | Nelson Prada | Pensacola Blue Wahoos | Miami Marlins | 1st | 1st | 79–58 | |

== Wins by team ==
Active Southern League teams appear in bold.

| Team | Award(s) | Year(s) |
|---|---|---|
| Jacksonville Suns (Jacksonville Expos) | 7 | 1973, 1982, 1984, 1987, 1990, 2001, 2006 |
| **Birmingham Barons** | 5 | 1983, 1993, 2002, 2005, 2009 |
| Orlando Cubs (Orlando Twins/Sun Rays) | 5 | 1975, 1981, 1984, 1990, 1995 |
| **Chattanooga Lookouts** | 4 | 1976, 1996, 2004, 2017 |
| Greenville Braves | 4 | 1988, 1991, 1992, 1997 |
| Huntsville Stars | 4 | 1989, 2003, 2007, 1994 |
| **Knoxville Smokies** (Knoxville Sox/Blue Jays/Tennessee Smokies) | 4 | 1972, 1974, 1985, 2010 |
| Mobile BayBears | 4 | 1998, 2011, 2013, 2014 |
| **Biloxi Shuckers** | 3 | 2015, 2018, 2025 |
| Columbus Astros | 3 | 1979, 1985, 1986 |
| Jackson Generals (West Tenn Diamond Jaxx) | 3 | 1999, 2000, 2016 |
| **Montgomery Biscuits** | 3 | 2012, 2019, 2024 |
| Mississippi Braves | 2 | 2008, 2021 |
| **Pensacola Blue Wahoos** | 2 | 2023, 2026 |
| Montgomery Rebels | 1 | 1977 |
| Nashville Sounds | 1 | 1980 |
| **Rocket City Trash Pandas** | 1 | 2022 |
| Savannah Braves | 1 | 1978 |

== Wins by organization ==
Active Southern League–Major League Baseball affiliations appear in bold.

| Organization | Award(s) | Year(s) |
|---|---|---|
| **Atlanta Braves** | 7 | 1978, 1988, 1991, 1992, 1997, 2008, 2021 |
| **Chicago White Sox** | 6 | 1972, 1974, 1993, 2002, 2005, 2009 |
| **Milwaukee Brewers** | 5 | 2003, 2007, 2015, 2018, 2025 |
| Minnesota Twins | 5 | 1975, 1981, 1984, 1990, 2017 |
| **Chicago Cubs** | 4 | 1995, 1999, 2000, 2010 |
| Arizona Diamondbacks | 3 | 2011, 2013, 2014 |
| Houston Astros | 3 | 1979, 1985, 1986 |
| Oakland Athletics | 3 | 1976, 1989, 1994 |
| Washington Nationals (Montreal Expos) | 3 | 1984, 1987, 1990 |
| **Cincinnati Reds** | 2 | 1996, 2004 |
| Detroit Tigers | 2 | 1977, 1983 |
| Kansas City Royals | 2 | 1973, 1982 |
| Los Angeles Dodgers | 2 | 2001, 2006 |
| **Miami Marlins** | 2 | 2023, 2026 |
| **Los Angeles Angels** | 1 | 2022 |
| New York Yankees | 1 | 1980 |
| San Diego Padres | 1 | 1998 |
| Seattle Mariners | 1 | 2016 |
| Toronto Blue Jays | 1 | 1985 |
