= Ken Hottman =

American baseball player (1948–2018)

- Left fielder
- Born: May 7, 1948; Stockton, California, U.S.
- Died: April 16, 2018 (aged 69); Sacramento, California, U.S.
- Batted: Right Threw: Right

MLB debut
- September 11, 1971, for the Chicago White Sox

Last MLB appearance
- September 30, 1971, for the Chicago White Sox

MLB statistics
- Batting average: .125
- Home runs: 0
- Runs batted in: 0
- Stats at Baseball Reference

Teams
- Chicago White Sox (1971)

Kenneth Roger Hottman (May 7, 1948 – April 16, 2018) was an American professional baseball player. An outfielder, Hottman hit for power in minor league baseball, but his Major League service was limited to six games played and 17 plate appearances with the 1971 Chicago White Sox. He threw and batted right-handed, stood 5 feet 11 inches (1.80 m) tall and weighed 190 pounds (86 kg) during his active career.

== Career ==
Hottman was a high draft choice of four teams in 1967–68, when the Major League Baseball draft had January as well as June lotteries, and both primary and secondary phases. He was selected first or second by the Kansas City Athletics, San Francisco Giants and St. Louis Cardinals before signing with the fourth club to pick him, the White Sox, after being their second choice in the June 1968 secondary phase. His breakout minor league season happened in 1971, when he slugged 37 home runs, batted in 116 runs and hit .302 for the Asheville Tourists of the Double-A Southern League. Called up in September, Hottman started in five games in left field for the ChiSox, and garnered two singles in 16 at bats; his first MLB hit came off the Athletics' rookie phenom Vida Blue on September 22.

Hottman resumed his minor league career at the Triple-A level in 1972, and retired from professional ball after the 1974 season. He hit 117 homers in 653 minor league games, but batted only .251.

Hottman died April 16, 2018.
