= Mike Reinbach =

American baseball player (1949-1989)

- Outfielder / Designated hitter
- Born: August 6, 1949; San Diego, California, U.S.
- Died: May 20, 1989 (aged 39); Palm Desert, California, U.S.
- Batted: Left Threw: Right

Professional debut
- MLB: April 7, 1974, for the Baltimore Orioles
- NPB: April 7, 1976, for the Hanshin Tigers

Last appearance
- MLB: June 1, 1974, for the Baltimore Orioles
- NPB: 1980, for the Hanshin Tigers

MLB statistics
- Batting average: .250
- Home runs: 0
- Runs batted in: 2

NPB statistics
- Batting average: .296
- Home runs: 94
- Runs batted in: 324
- Stats at Baseball Reference

Teams
- Baltimore Orioles (1974); Hanshin Tigers (1976–1980)

Michael Wayne Reinbach (August 6, 1949 – May 20, 1989) was an American corner outfielder and designated hitter in Major League Baseball who played for the Baltimore Orioles in its 1974 season. Listed at 6' 2", 195 lb., Reinbach batted left handed and threw right handed. He was born in San Diego, California.

== Career and life ==
Reinbach was selected by the Orioles in the 1970 MLB draft out of University of California, Los Angeles, where he played for their UCLA Bruins baseball team.

His rise through the Orioles Minor League system was highlighted by a splendid 1972 season, hitting a .348 batting average with 31 home runs, 113 RBI, and a 1.087 OPS between AA and AAA while being named Southern League most valuable player, to become the first player to win this award in the league's history.

He appeared in 12 games in his only season at Baltimore, going 5-for-20 for a .250 average with a double, two runs and two RBI.

Reinbach opened 1975 at Triple A Rochester Red Wings, where he batted .290 with 11 home runs and 62 RBI and was selected to the International League All-Star team. He then joined the Hanshin Tigers of Nippon Professional Baseball during five seasons spanning 1976–1980, becoming immediately a Tigers fans favorite for his timely hitting and solid play at first base and right field. Overall, Reinbach hit .296 with 94 homers and 324 RBI in 545 games for Hanshin and earned Best Nine Award honors in 1979.

In six minor league seasons, Reinbach hit .284 with 68 homers and 331 RBI in 674 games. In between, he played winter ball with the Navegantes del Magallanes club of the Venezuelan League during the 1973-74 tournament.

Reinbach retired after his 1980 season at Japan and spent most of the decade as a pioneer in the burgeoning home computer industry. He was killed in an automobile accident in 1989, when his car went off a precipice in Palm Desert, California while driving to Palm Springs. He was 39 years old.
