= Arlington Stadium =

Former stadium in Arlington, Texas, US

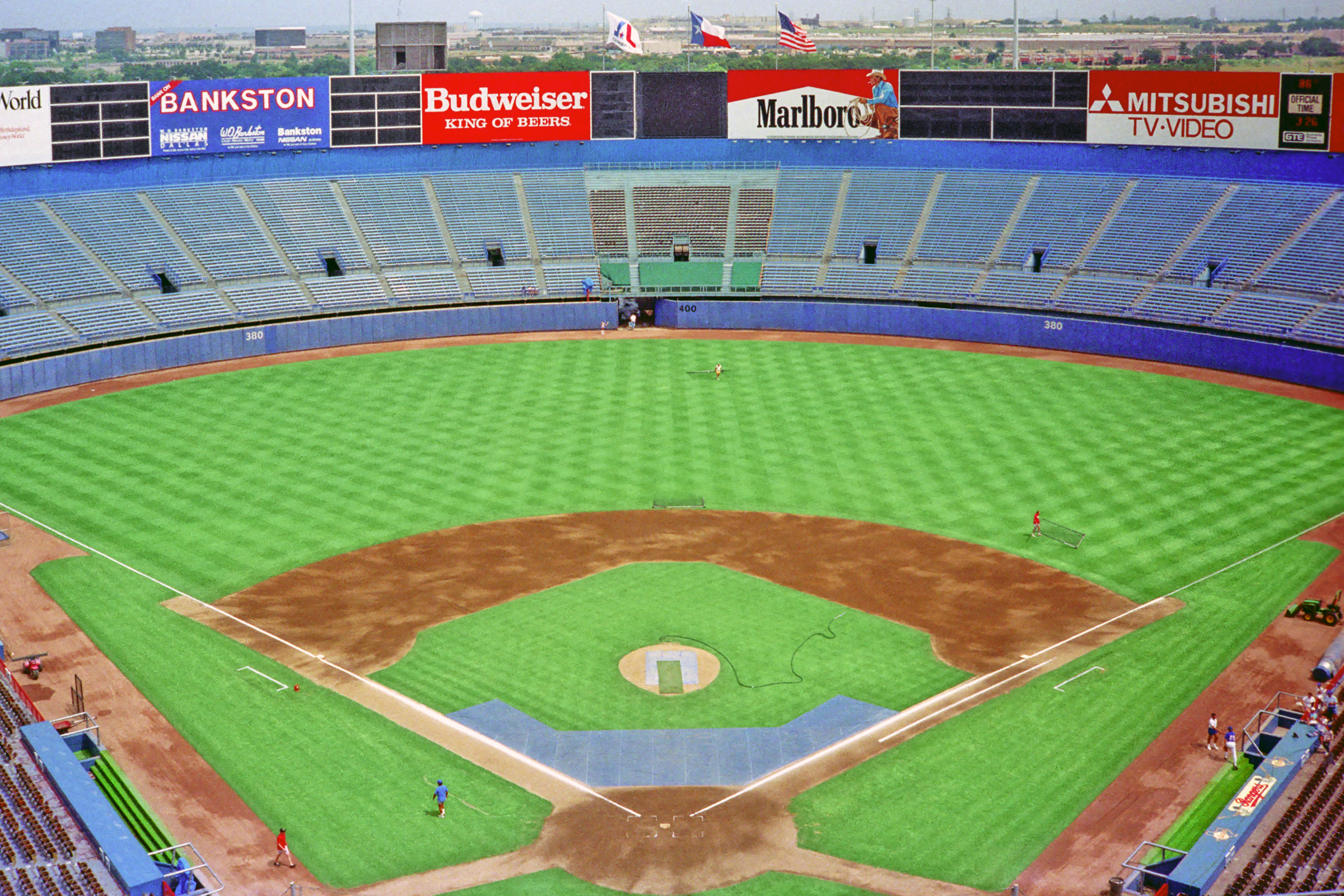
- Interactive map of Arlington Stadium
- Former names: Turnpike Stadium (1965–1971)
- Location: 1701 E Copeland Rd. Arlington, Texas 76011
- Coordinates: 32°45′23″N 97°5′5″W
- Owner: The City of Arlington
- Operator: The City of Arlington
- Capacity: 10,600 (1965–1969); 20,500 (1970–1971); 35,185 (1972); 35,698 (1973–1977); 41,097 (1978–1980); 41,284 (1981–1984); 43,508 (1985–1990); 43,521 (1991–1993)
- Surface: Grass
- Field size: Left Field – 330 ft Left-Center – 380 ft Center Field – 400 ft Right-Center – 380 ft Right Field – 330 ft Backstop – 60 ft

Construction
- Groundbreaking: April 15, 1964
- Opened: April 23, 1965
- Closed: October 3, 1993
- Demolished: 1994
- Cost: US$1.9 million
- Architect: Preston M. Geren Architects & Engineers
- General contractor: Walker Construction Co.

Tenants
- Dallas–Fort Worth Spurs (TL) (1965–1971); UT Arlington Mavericks (NCAA) (1970–1976); Texas Rangers (MLB) (1972–1993); Dallas Tornado(North American Soccer League)(1968 partial schedule)

Arlington Stadium was a baseball stadium located in Arlington, Texas, United States, located between Dallas and Fort Worth, Texas. It served as the home of the Texas Rangers of Major League Baseball (MLB) from 1972 until 1993, after which the team moved into The Ballpark in Arlington (now Choctaw Stadium).

== History ==
=== Early years as a minor league stadium ===
The stadium was built in 1965 as Turnpike Stadium, a minor league ballpark seating 10,000 people named for the nearby Dallas–Fort Worth Turnpike (now part of Interstate 30, and known as the Tom Landry Highway). The Fort Worth Cats of the Texas League moved there as the Dallas–Fort Worth Spurs, and played there for the next seven years, setting many Texas League attendance records during their tenure at the stadium, especially after it expanded to 20,500 seats in 1970.

However, the stadium's real purpose was to attract a major league team to the Metroplex. It had been built to be upgraded to Major League standards of the era, and was designed to be expandable to up to 50,000 seats (although its final actual capacity was 7,000 seats below that). Due to its location in a natural bowl, only minimal excavations (such as connecting dugouts directly to the clubhouses) would be necessary for it to be ready for a big-league team. Although it was built primarily with baseball in mind, its general shape was very similar to the major league multi-purpose stadiums that were beginning to emerge in the mid-1960s. In fact, the stadium was designed to accommodate football, but the Dallas Cowboys were never interested in playing in the stadium, and they ended up building Texas Stadium instead. The Metroplex had been mentioned as a possible expansion site since the 1950s, and Arlington Mayor Tom Vandergriff figured that Arlington, halfway between the two cities, would be the best site for a prospective major league team.

=== 1970s–1980s ===
In 1971, the struggling second incarnation of the Washington Senators announced their intentions to move to the Metroplex under the banner of the Texas Rangers. The stadium was expanded to seat over 35,700 people, and was renamed Arlington Stadium. The stadium played host to its first major league game on April 21, 1972, when the Rangers inaugurated the stadium by defeating the California Angels, 7–6; MLB's first-ever strike had disrupted the start of the 1972 season, hence the later than anticipated opening day.

Arlington Stadium had no roof, and thus virtually no protection from the oppressive Texas heat. For nearly all of its existence, it was the hottest stadium in the majors. It was not unusual for game-time temperatures to be well above 100 °F (38 °C). Combined with the Rangers' mediocre performance, this held down attendance considerably during the 1970s. Due in part to the heat, the Rangers scheduled nearly all of their games from May through September at night to get around it. Other than nearby amusement park Six Flags Over Texas, there was no neighborhood around the park. In his book Storied Stadiums, Curt Smith described it as "small, (but) not intimate".

The scoreboard in the Rangers' early days was a long, horizontal rectangle with a panel shaped like the state of Texas. It was replaced after the 1984 season with a new scoreboard and series of billboards that ran from both foul poles. "Cotton-Eyed Joe" was played during the seventh-inning stretch for fans to dance to instead of "Take Me Out to the Ballgame". Arlington Stadium was also the first major league ballpark to sell nachos (in 1974).

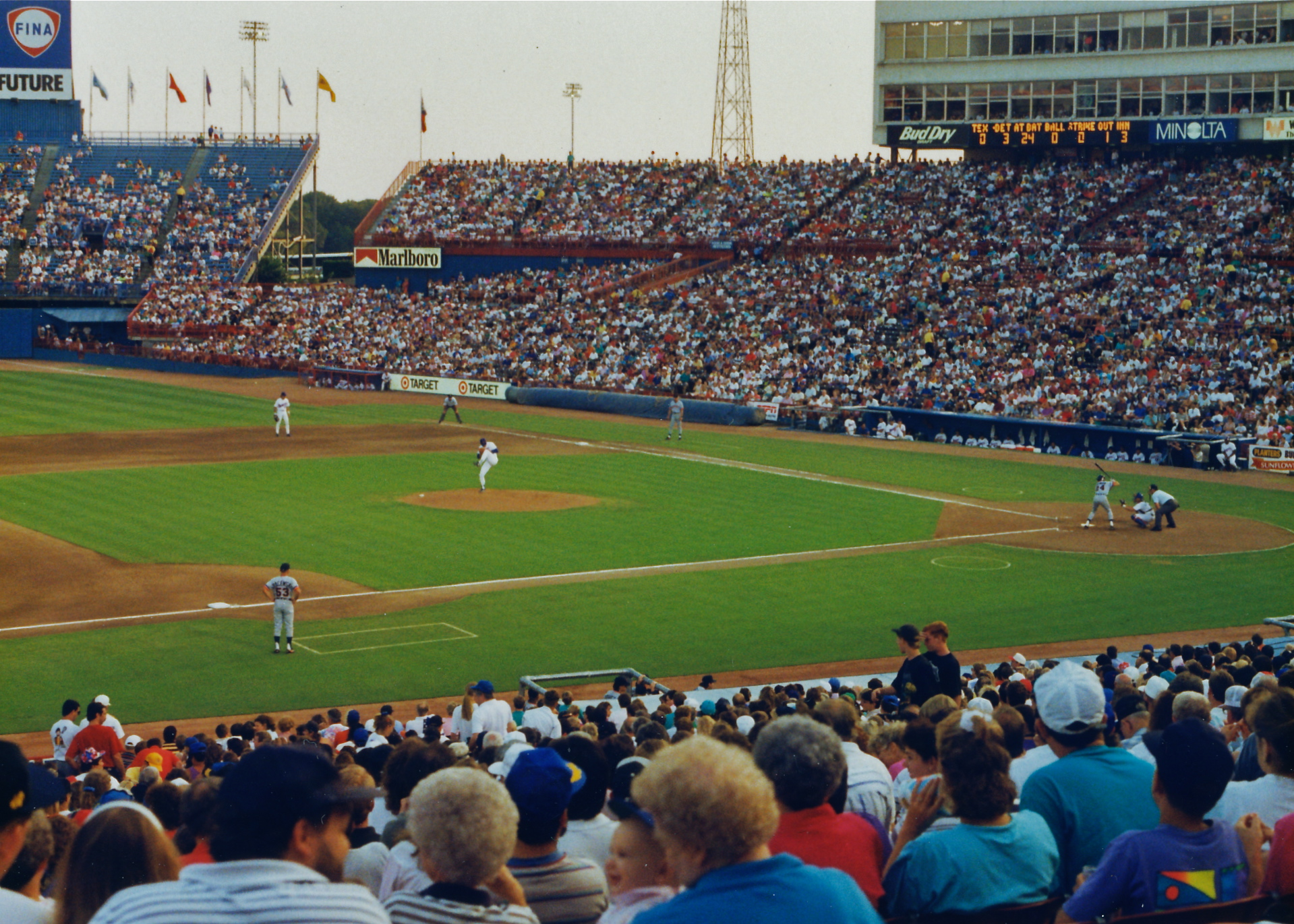
Nolan Ryan pitching at Arlington Stadium in 1992.

=== 1990s ===
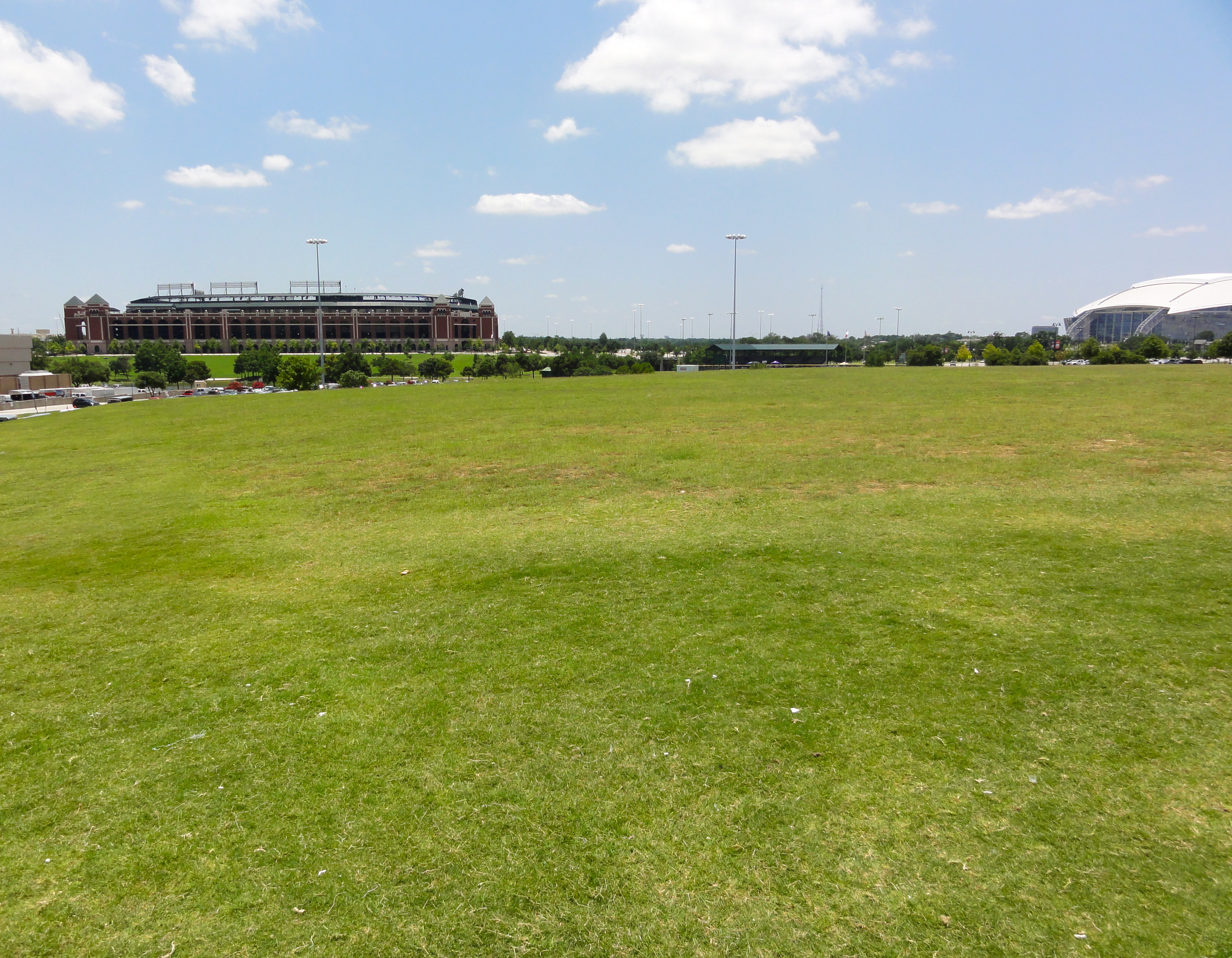
A large portion of the stadium's site is now occupied by an empty field, pictured in 2012. Choctaw Stadium and AT&T Stadium are visible in the background.

The stadium eventually began to show its age and inadequacy, and the City of Arlington approved the construction of a new stadium for the Rangers. The last game was played in Arlington Stadium on October 3, 1993, resulting in a 4–1 win by the visiting Kansas City Royals, witnessed by 41,039 fans (it was also the final game in the career of Hall-of-Famer George Brett, who recorded the last hit in the stadium with a ninth-inning single). Following the 1993 season, the Rangers moved to The Ballpark in Arlington, which was built nearby, and Arlington Stadium was demolished in 1994. The foul poles and home plate from Arlington Stadium were moved to the new ballpark, along with some of the bleachers. The bleachers were painted green, but their original blue color is occasionally visible in spots where the green paint has chipped. Home plate was inserted into place at the Ballpark in Arlington by Tom Schieffer (Texas Rangers then president), Richard Greene (then mayor of Arlington), Tom Vandergriff (former mayor responsible for bringing the team to Arlington), and George W. Bush (then team part-owner; later Governor of Texas and President of the United States).

The site of the old stadium is just west of the Arlington Convention Center and north of the youth ballpark. It was partially paved in 2001 to provide parking for the Convention Center, and Legends Way was built through the center of the site in 2007 to provide an access road to the new Cowboys Stadium. The road was renamed AT&T Way in 2013 along with the corporate renaming of Cowboys Stadium. About a quarter of the former stadium site remains unpaved and undeveloped as of 2019.

Prior to the 2016 season, the original foul poles from Arlington Stadium were replaced at then-Globe Life Park in Arlington.

As of 2022, part of the site has been redeveloped as part of the National Medal of Honor Museum.

=== Notable moments ===
Arlington Stadium never saw a playoff game or an All-Star Game, but was host to several of Nolan Ryan's greatest moments, including his 5,000th strikeout and his seventh (and final) no-hitter. Baltimore Orioles shortstop Cal Ripken Jr. and Rangers outfielder Oddibe McDowell, were the only two players to hit for the cycle in Arlington Stadium. It was also the site of the 11th perfect game in Major League Baseball history, when Mike Witt of the California Angels defeated the Rangers on September 30, 1984, 1–0.

A memorable brawl happened on August 4, 1993, when the Rangers hosted the Chicago White Sox. Ryan, the starter for that game, hit Robin Ventura with a pitch. Ventura decided to charge the mound, which emptied both benches. As Ventura reached the mound, Ryan immediately caught him in a head lock and punched him on the top of his head six times.

=== Legacy ===
Because so many Rangers home games, including Sundays, were played at night, and because, unlike local broadcast TV stations, regional cable sports networks were not allowed to air any Sunday baseball games from Arlington that would be played at night, Arlington Stadium was partly responsible for the creation of ESPN Sunday Night Baseball. Today, Truist Park in Cumberland, Georgia continues to regularly host Sunday night baseball games during the summer months, as retractable roof stadiums, including Globe Life Field have allowed MLB teams in the southern United States to play more day games on Sundays.

Preceded by RFK Stadium	Home of the Texas Rangers; 1972–1993	Succeeded by Globe Life Park in Arlington
