= Jim Napier =

American baseball player and manager (1938–2018)

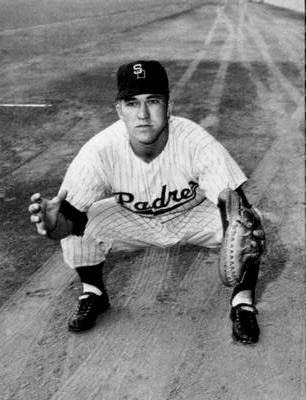
Napier, circa 1961

James Carol Napier (born August 2, 1938, at Wasco, California, USA, died February 11, 2018) was a minor league baseball catcher and manager. As a player, he stood 5 ft 11 in (180 cm) tall and weighed 200 pounds (91 kg); he batted and threw right-handed.

Napier attended Bakersfield College for two years before entering professional baseball in 1958 with the Chicago White Sox organization. He spent 19 seasons (1958–65; 1967–77) with the Chisox as a minor league player (through 1972) and manager (1973–77, inclusive). A stalwart defensive player, Napier was named a catcher on three consecutive minor league all-star teams: in the Class D Midwest League in 1958, as a member of the Dubuque Packers; in the Class C Northern League in 1959, playing for the Duluth–Superior Dukes; and in the Class A Sally League in 1960, with the Charleston White Sox. However, he struggled as a batsman. In his best overall season, his first at Dubuque, Napier hit .254 in 403 at bats, with 18 home runs and 79 runs batted in.

In 1973, Napier was named manager of Chicago's Knoxville White Sox affiliate in the Class AA Southern League. His 1974 Knoxville club won the league championship. Out of baseball in 1978, Napier joined the crosstown Chicago Cubs the following season as skipper of the Quad Cities Cubs of the Class A Midwest League, winning the 1979 MWL title. He spent two seasons at Quad Cities, one year as a roving minor league pitching instructor, then three seasons (1982–84) as pilot of the Iowa Cubs of the Class AAA American Association, making the playoffs in 1983 and 1984.

In 1985, Napier left the Cubs to become coordinator of minor league instruction for the Cleveland Indians before returning for a final season as minor league manager, with the 1986 Maine Guides of the Class AAA International League, the Indians' top farm team.

His career record as manager was 744 victories, 772 losses (.491), with two championships.

James died on the morning of February 11, 2018 in Tucson, Arizona.
