= Nyls Nyman =

American baseball player (born 1954)

- Outfielder
- Born: March 7, 1954 (age 71); Detroit, Michigan, U.S.
- Batted: Left Threw: Right

MLB debut
- September 6, 1974, for the Chicago White Sox

Last MLB appearance
- April 7, 1977, for the Chicago White Sox

MLB statistics
- Batting average: .238
- Home runs: 2
- Runs batted in: 33
- Stats at Baseball Reference

Teams
- Chicago White Sox (1974–1977)

Nyls Wallace Rex Nyman (born March 7, 1954) is an American former professional baseball outfielder. He played in Major League Baseball (MLB) from 1974 to 1977 for the Chicago White Sox.

Nyman was selected by the White Sox in the 16th round of the 1972 Major League Baseball draft. By 1974, he was already making an appearance at the major league level, going 9-for-14 in a September tryout. In 1975, Nyman split time in left field with Jerry Hairston, playing 106 games with the White Sox, batting .226. Over the next two seasons, however, Nyman saw little time in the majors, with 15 at bats in 1976 and just a single pinch-hitting appearance on opening day, 1977, in the first American League game played in Canada (vs. the Toronto Blue Jays at Exhibition Stadium). He never again played in the major leagues, his big league career over at the age of 23.

In September, 1977 he was traded to the St. Louis Cardinals as part of the deal that brought ace reliever Clay Carroll to Chicago. He played two more seasons in the minor leagues, with his final season coming in 1979 with the Indianapolis Indians.

Nyman is the brother of fellow former major leaguer Chris Nyman. He is currently an assistant baseball coach at Lassen Community College in Susanville, California.

== Sources ==
- Career statistics from Baseball Reference, or Baseball Reference (Minors)
