= Mike Squires (baseball) =

American baseball player (born 1952)

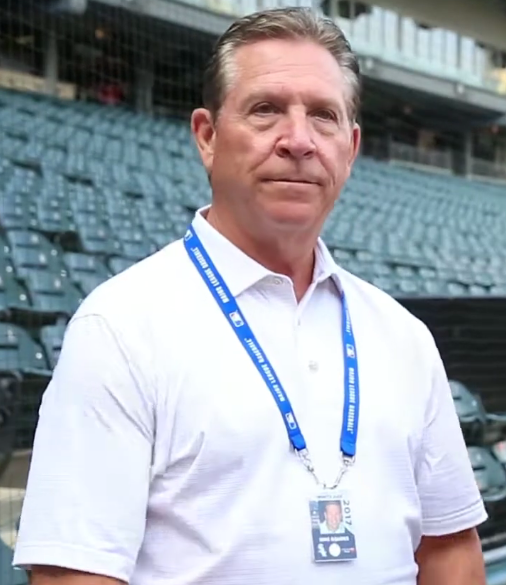
- Squires in 2017
- First baseman
- Born: March 5, 1952 (age 74); Kalamazoo, Michigan, U.S.
- Batted: Left Threw: Left

MLB debut
- September 1, 1975, for the Chicago White Sox

Last MLB appearance
- September 24, 1985, for the Chicago White Sox

MLB statistics
- Batting average: .260
- Home runs: 6
- Runs batted in: 141
- Stats at Baseball Reference

Teams
- Chicago White Sox (1975, 1977–1985)

Career highlights and awards
- Gold Glove Award (1981)

Michael Lynn Squires (born March 5, 1952) is an American former Major League Baseball player who played for the Chicago White Sox primarily as a first baseman in 1975 and from 1977 to 1985. He won the American League Gold Glove Award at first base in 1981. Squires was best known as a defensive player, often coming on in late inning situations when the White Sox had a slim lead. He did not have the typical power associated with a corner infielder, never hitting more than two home runs in a season. Nonetheless, he was a valuable member of the White Sox of the early Tony La Russa era, particularly in their 1983 AL West championship run.

On May 4, 1980, Squires became the first left-handed-throwing catcher in Major League Baseball since Dale Long in 1958 when he was shifted from first base in the ninth inning of an 11–1 loss to the Milwaukee Brewers at Comiskey Park. He would go behind home plate one more time three days later on the same homestand, coming off the bench in the ninth inning of a 12–5 defeat to the Kansas City Royals. He replaced Bruce Kimm in both instances.

He became the first left-handed-throwing third baseman in at least 50 years on August 23, 1983 when he entered the game for Vance Law in the bottom of the eighth inning in a 10–2 loss to the Royals in Kansas City. He would play thirteen more games at third base the following season, including four starts at the position.

In a 10 year, 779 game major league career, Squires compiled a .260 batting average (411-for-1580) with 6 home runs, 211 runs and 141 RBI. Defensively, he recorded a .995 fielding percentage. Between 1982 and 1984, the White Sox went 242–120 for a .669 winning percentage during games Squires played, and without Squires, the White Sox were 18–106 for a .145 winning percentage – a split of .523 points – the highest winning percentage split with or without a single player over a three season span in baseball history.

As of 2009, Squires worked as a scout for the Cincinnati Reds.

== See also ==
- List of Major League Baseball players who spent their entire career with one franchise
