= Bobby Dews =

- Coach
- Born: March 23, 1939; Clinton, Iowa, U.S.
- Died: December 26, 2015 (aged 76); Albany, Georgia, U.S.
- Batted: Right Threw: Right
- Stats at Baseball Reference

Teams
- As coach: Atlanta Braves (1979–1981, 1985, 1997–2006)

Robert Walter Dews (March 23, 1939 – December 26, 2015) was an American infielder in minor league baseball and a coach in Major League Baseball. He threw and batted right-handed and was listed as 6 feet 1 inch (1.85 m) tall and 165 pounds (75 kg).

Born in the small town of Clinton, Iowa, Bobby Dews moved to rural Edison, Georgia, to live with his grandparents at an early age and graduated from Edison High School (now Calhoun County High School).

Dews played baseball and basketball for the Georgia Tech Yellow Jackets before being signed by the St. Louis Cardinals. He then followed in the footsteps of his stepmother and other family members by obtaining his associate degree in 1963 from Andrew College in Cuthbert, Georgia, and later graduated with a bachelor's degree from West Georgia College.

Dews played and managed in the Cardinals' farm system before joining the Atlanta Braves organization in 1974. The 2008 season marked Dews' 35th consecutive season with the Braves, including 14 years spent as an MLB coach. He managed at multiple minor league levels, while serving as field coordinator of instruction in its farm system. His career as an Atlanta coach occurred during three different terms (1979–81; 1985; 1997–2006). After the 2006 season, at age 67, he retired as the Braves' bullpen coach to become a roving coach. In addition, he worked with the Braves at home games and for the minor league teams when the major league club was on the road.

In an article published in the Atlanta magazine printed in March 2003 (Vol. 42, No. 12, Page 60), Dews references his writings from as far back as 35 years prior. Of particular note is his book Legends Demons and Dreams, originally released in hardcover by Longstreet Press in 2005 and published in paperback in 2007 by Literati Press.

In 2008, Dews became a writer-in-residence at Andrew College in Cuthbert, Georgia, where he attended college for a short time. While a writer-in-residence at Andrew, Dews completed and published a second collection of stories entitled An Illusion of Victory, which were released by CreateSpace in 2009.

Dews died on December 26, 2015, in Albany, Georgia at the age of 76. The Braves wore a patch in his memory for the 2016 season, a white rectangle with a black outline and his nickname "Dewsy" in black, on the right sleeve.
