= Southern League Most Valuable Player Award =

- Sport: Baseball
- League: Southern League
- Awarded for: Regular-season most valuable player of the Southern League
- Country: United States
- Presented by: Southern League

History
- First award: Mike Reinbach (1972)
- Most recent: Blake Burke (2026)

The Southern League Most Valuable Player Award (MVP) is an annual award given to the best player in Minor League Baseball's Southern League based on their regular-season performance as voted on by league managers. League broadcasters, Minor League Baseball executives, and members of the media have previously voted as well. Though the league was established in 1964, the award was not created until 1972. After the cancellation of the 2020 season, the league was known as the Double-A South in 2021 before reverting to the Southern League name in 2022.

Twenty-one outfielders have won the MVP Award, the most of any position. First basemen, with 15 winners, have won the most among infielders, followed by third basemen (7) and second basemen and shortstops (2). Eight catchers have also won the award.

Two players who won the MVP Award also won the Southern League Top MLB Prospect Award in the same season: Junior Caminero (2023) and Sal Stewart (2025).

Six players from the Knoxville Smokies have been selected for the MVP Award, more than any other team in the league, followed by the Huntsville Stars and Montgomery Biscuits (5); the Carolina Mudcats, Chattanooga Lookouts, Columbus Mudcats, and Memphis Chicks (4); the Biloxi Shuckers, Birmingham Barons, Jackson Generals, and Jacksonville Suns (3); the Greenville Braves, Mobile BayBears, and Nashville Sounds (2); and the Asheville Orioles, Charlotte O's, Mississippi Braves, Montgomery Rebels, and Orlando Twins (1).

Six players from the Chicago White Sox Major League Baseball (MLB) organization have won the award, more than any other, followed by the Milwaukee Brewers and Tampa Bay Rays organizations (5); the Cincinnati Reds and Houston Astros organizations (4); the Arizona Diamondbacks, Atlanta Braves, Kansas City Royals, and Oakland Athletics organizations (3); the Baltimore Orioles, Chicago Cubs, Detroit Tigers, Minnesota Twins, New York Yankees, Pittsburgh Pirates, Toronto Blue Jays, and Washington Nationals organizations (2); and the Miami Marlins, San Diego Padres, and Seattle Mariners organizations (1).

== Winners ==
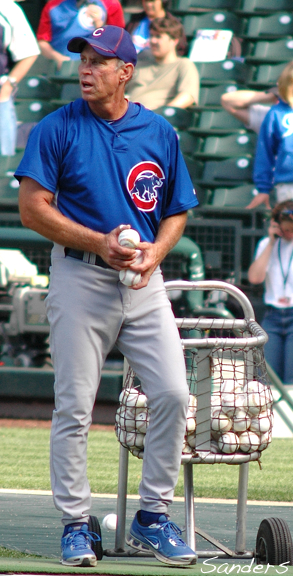
Alan Trammell, the 1977 MVP, was inducted into the Baseball Hall of Fame in 2010.

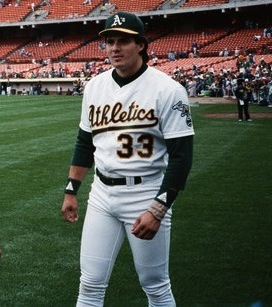
Jose Canseco, the 1985 winner, was the 1986 American League Rookie of the Year and the 1988 American League MVP.

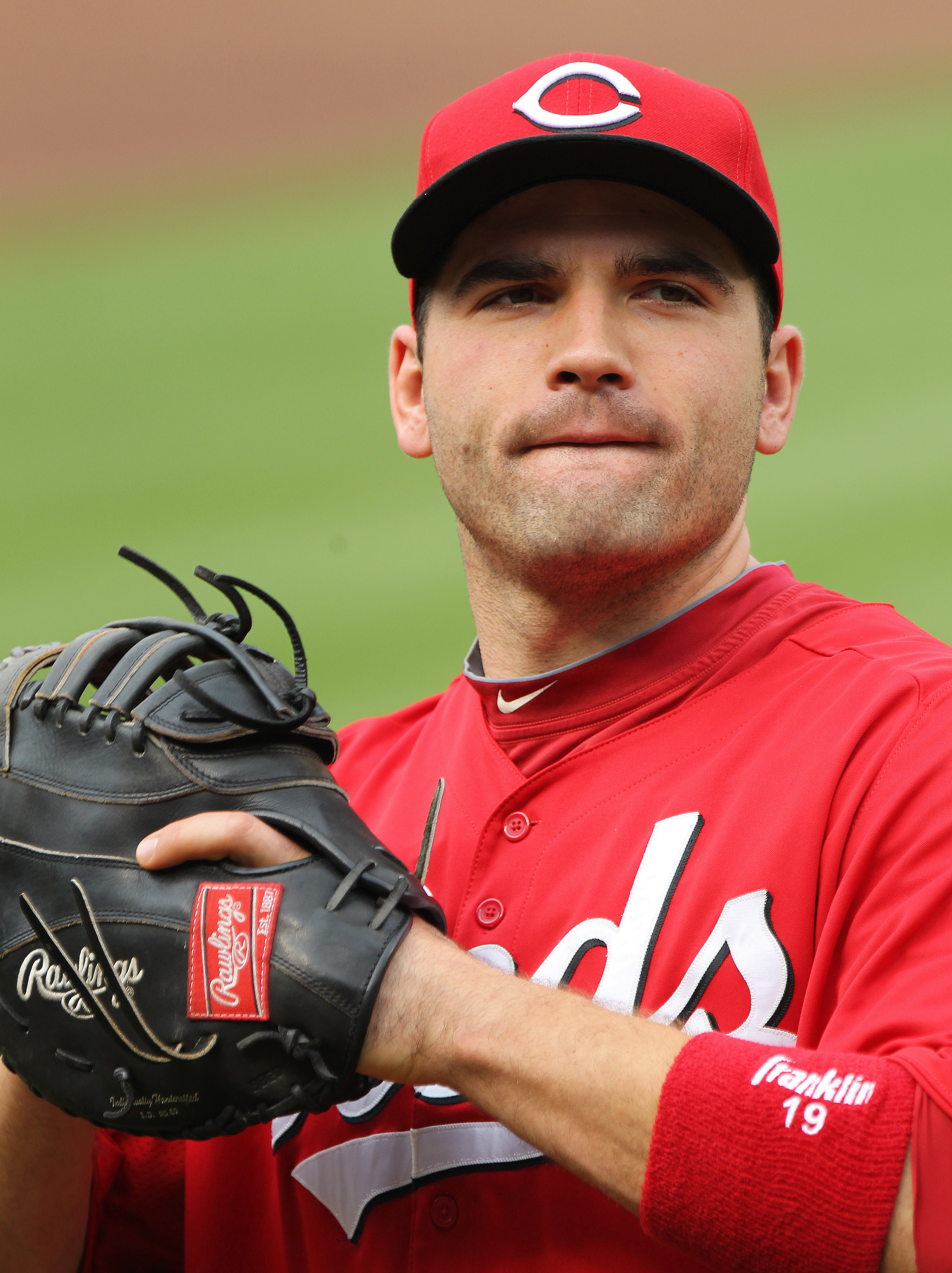
Joey Votto, the 2006 Most Valuable Player, won the National League MVP Award in 2010.

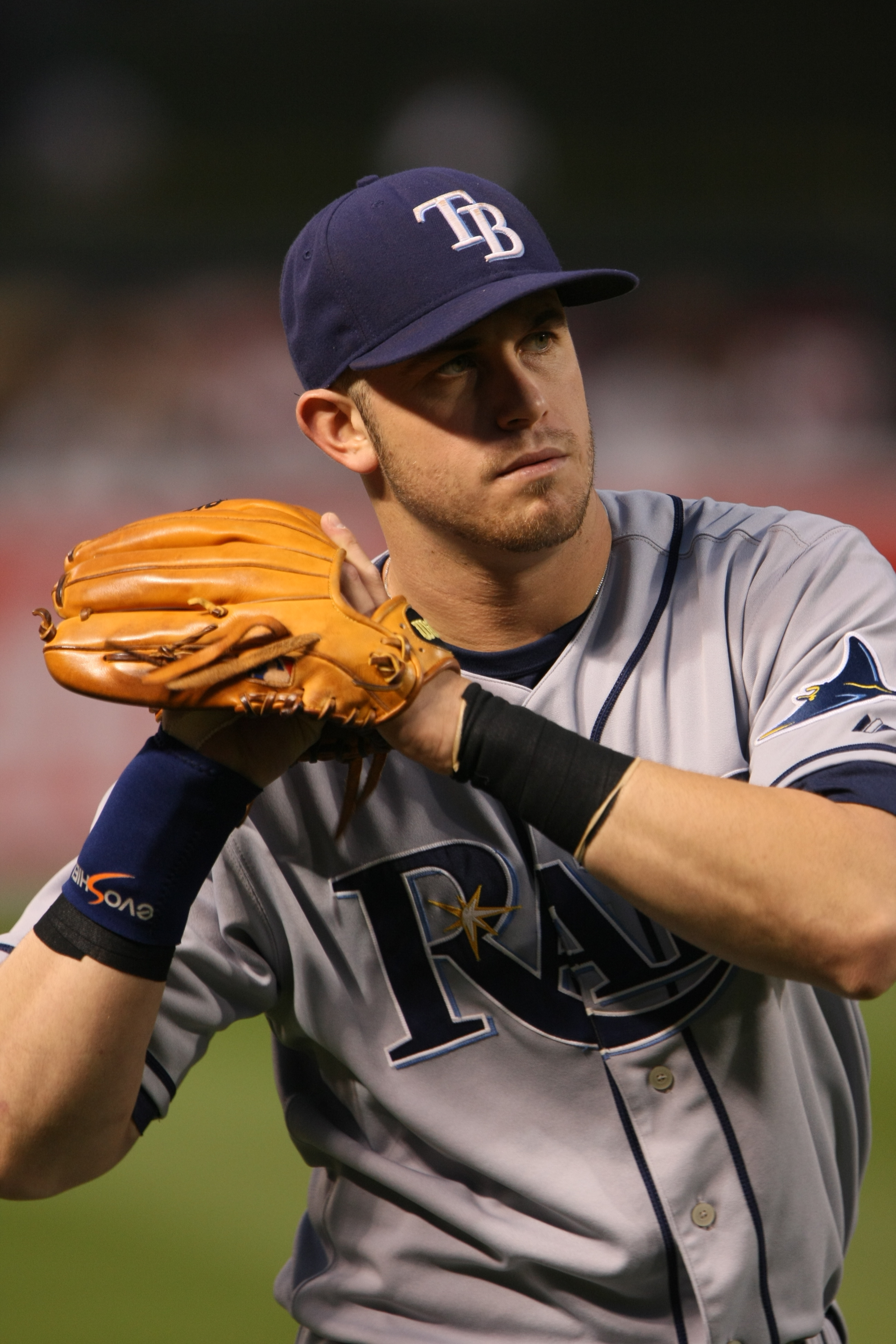
Evan Longoria, the 2007 MVP, won the American League Rookie of the Year Award in 2008.

Key
Position	Indicates the player's primary position
^	Indicates multiple award winners in the same year

Winners
Year	Winner	Team	Organization	Position	Ref(s).
1972	Mike Reinbach	Asheville Orioles	Baltimore Orioles	Outfielder	
1973	Jerry Moxey	Columbus Astros	Houston Astros	Outfielder	
1974	Nyls Nyman	Knoxville Sox	Chicago White Sox	Outfielder	
1975	Mike Squires	Knoxville Sox	Chicago White Sox	First baseman	
1976	Larry Foster	Knoxville Sox	Chicago White Sox	Outfielder	
1977	Alan Trammell	Montgomery Rebels	Detroit Tigers	Shortstop	
1978	Eddie Gates	Memphis Chicks	Montreal Expos	Outfielder	
1979^	Danny Heep	Columbus Astros	Houston Astros	Outfielder	
1979^	Alan Knicely	Columbus Astros	Houston Astros	Catcher	
1980	Steve Balboni	Nashville Sounds	New York Yankees	First baseman	
1981	Tim Laudner	Orlando Twins	Minnesota Twins	Catcher	
1982	Brian Dayett	Nashville Sounds	New York Yankees	Outfielder	
1983	John Morris	Jacksonville Suns	Kansas City Royals	Outfielder	
1984	Andrés Galarraga	Jacksonville Suns	Montreal Expos	First baseman	
1985	Jose Canseco	Huntsville Stars	Oakland Athletics	Outfielder	
1986	Terry Steinbach	Huntsville Stars	Oakland Athletics	Catcher	
1987	Tom Dodd	Charlotte O's	Baltimore Orioles	First baseman	
1988	Matt Winters	Memphis Chicks	Kansas City Royals	Outfielder	
1989	Eric Anthony	Columbus Mudcats	Houston Astros	Outfielder	
1990	Jeff Conine	Memphis Chicks	Kansas City Royals	First baseman	
1991	Ryan Klesko	Greenville Braves	Atlanta Braves	First baseman	
1992	Javy López	Greenville Braves	Atlanta Braves	Catcher	
1993	Carlos Delgado	Knoxville Smokies	Toronto Blue Jays	Catcher	
1994	Mark Johnson	Carolina Mudcats	Pittsburgh Pirates	First baseman	
1995	Jason Kendall	Carolina Mudcats	Pittsburgh Pirates	Catcher	
1996	Derrek Lee	Memphis Chicks	San Diego Padres	First baseman	
1997	Ben Grieve	Huntsville Stars	Oakland Athletics	Outfielder	
1998	Gabe Kapler	Jacksonville Suns	Detroit Tigers	Outfielder	
1999	Brady Clark	Chattanooga Lookouts	Cincinnati Reds	Outfielder	
2000	Joe Crede	Birmingham Barons	Chicago White Sox	Third baseman	
2001	Josh Phelps	Tennessee Smokies	Toronto Blue Jays	Catcher	
2002	Aaron Miles	Birmingham Barons	Chicago White Sox	Second baseman	
2003	Corey Hart	Huntsville Stars	Milwaukee Brewers	Third baseman	
2004	Richard Lewis	West Tenn Diamond Jaxx	Chicago Cubs	Second baseman	
2005	Delmon Young	Montgomery Biscuits	Tampa Bay Devil Rays	Outfielder	
2006	Joey Votto	Chattanooga Lookouts	Cincinnati Reds	First baseman	
2007	Evan Longoria	Montgomery Biscuits	Tampa Bay Devil Rays	Third baseman	
2008	Gaby Sánchez	Carolina Mudcats	Florida Marlins	First baseman	
2009	Desmond Jennings	Montgomery Biscuits	Tampa Bay Rays	Outfielder	
2010	Dave Sappelt	Carolina Mudcats	Cincinnati Reds	Outfielder	
2011	Paul Goldschmidt	Mobile BayBears	Arizona Diamondbacks	First baseman	
2012	Hunter Morris	Huntsville Stars	Milwaukee Brewers	First baseman	
2013	Marcus Semien	Birmingham Barons	Chicago White Sox	Shortstop	
2014	Jake Lamb	Mobile BayBears	Arizona Diamondbacks	Third baseman	
2015	Max Kepler	Chattanooga Lookouts	Minnesota Twins	Outfielder	
2016	Tyler O'Neill	Jackson Generals	Seattle Mariners	Outfielder	
2017	Kevin Cron	Jackson Generals	Arizona Diamondbacks	First baseman	
2018	Corey Ray	Biloxi Shuckers	Milwaukee Brewers	Outfielder	
2019	Drew Waters	Mississippi Braves	Atlanta Braves	Outfielder	
2020	None selected (season cancelled due to COVID-19 pandemic)				
2021	Jonathan Aranda	Montgomery Biscuits	Tampa Bay Rays	First baseman	
2022	Jakson Reetz	Biloxi Shuckers	Milwaukee Brewers	Catcher	
2023	Junior Caminero	Montgomery Biscuits	Tampa Bay Rays	Third baseman	
2024	Matt Shaw	Tennessee Smokies	Chicago Cubs	Third baseman	
2025	Sal Stewart	Chattanooga Lookouts	Cincinnati Reds	Third baseman	
2026	Blake Burke	Biloxi Shuckers	Milwaukee Brewers	First baseman	

== Wins by team ==
Active Southern League teams appear in bold.

Team	Award(s)	Year(s)
**Knoxville Smokies** (Knoxville Sox/Tennessee Smokies)	6	1974, 1975, 1976, 1993, 2001, 2024
Huntsville Stars	5	1985, 1986, 1997, 2003, 2012
**Montgomery Biscuits**	5	2005, 2007, 2009, 2021, 2023
Carolina Mudcats	4	1994, 1995, 2008, 2010
**Chattanooga Lookouts**	4	1999, 2006, 2015, 2025
Columbus Mudcats (Columbus Astros)	4	1973, 1979, (Note: Two players from Columbus were selected as MVPs in 1979.) 1989
Memphis Chicks	4	1978, 1988, 1990, 1996
**Biloxi Shuckers**	3	2018, 2022, 2026
**Birmingham Barons**	3	2000, 2002, 2013
Jackson Generals (West Tenn Diamond Jaxx)	3	2004, 2016, 2017
Jacksonville Suns	3	1983, 1984, 1998
Greenville Braves	2	1991, 1992
Mobile BayBears	2	2011, 2014
Nashville Sounds	2	1980, 1982
Asheville Orioles	1	1972
Charlotte O's	1	1987
Mississippi Braves	1	2019
Montgomery Rebels	1	1977
Orlando Twins	1	1981

== Wins by organization ==
Active Southern League–Major League Baseball affiliations appear in bold.

Organization	Award(s)	Year(s)
**Chicago White Sox**	6	1974, 1975, 1976, 2000, 2002, 2013
**Milwaukee Brewers**	5	2003, 2012, 2018, 2022, 2026
**Tampa Bay Rays** (Tampa Bay Devil Rays)	5	2005, 2007, 2009, 2021, 2023
**Cincinnati Reds**	4	1999, 2006, 2010, 2025
Houston Astros	4	1973, 1979, (Note: Two players from the Houston organization were selected as MVPs in 1979.) 1989
Arizona Diamondbacks	3	2011, 2014, 2017
**Atlanta Braves**	3	1991, 1992, 2019
Kansas City Royals	3	1983, 1988, 1990
Oakland Athletics	3	1985, 1986, 1997
Baltimore Orioles	2	1972, 1987
**Chicago Cubs**	2	2004, 2024
Detroit Tigers	2	1977, 1998
Minnesota Twins	2	1981, 2015
New York Yankees	2	1980, 1982
Pittsburgh Pirates	2	1994, 1995
Toronto Blue Jays	2	1993, 2001
Washington Nationals (Montreal Expos)	2	1978, 1984
**Miami Marlins** (Florida Marlins)	1	2008
San Diego Padres	1	1996
Seattle Mariners	1	2016
