= Savannah Braves =

- 1971–1983; Savannah, Georgia

Minor league affiliations
- Class: Double-A (1971–1983)
- League: Southern League (1971–1983)

Major league affiliations
- Team: Atlanta Braves (1971–1983)

Minor league titles
- League titles: None
- Division titles (1): 1978
- First-half titles (2): 1977; 1983
- Second-half titles (3): 1978; 1980; 1981

Team data
- Name: Savannah Braves (1971–1983)
- Colors: Red, white, royal blue
- Mascot: Indian Chief
- Ballpark: Grayson Stadium (1971–1983)

The Savannah Braves were a Minor League Baseball team of the Southern League and the Double-A affiliate of the Atlanta Braves from 1971 to 1983. They were located in Savannah, Georgia, and played their home games at Grayson Stadium. The franchise relocated to Greenville, South Carolina, as the Greenville Braves, after the 1983 season.

== Year-by-year record ==
Year	Record	Finish	Manager	Playoffs
1971	57-84	5th	Eddie Haas	not eligible
1972	80-59	2nd	Clint Courtney	not eligible
1973	71-68	3rd	Clint Courtney (34-23) / Tommie Aaron (37-45)	not eligible
1974	73-65	4th	Tommie Aaron	not eligible
1975	70-64	3rd (t)	Tommie Aaron	not eligible
1976	69-71	5th	Tommie Aaron	not eligible
1977	77-63	3rd	Gene Hassell	Lost in 1st round
1978	72-72	4th	Bobby Dews	Lost League Finals
1979	60-83	10th	Eddie Haas	not eligible
1980	77-67	3rd	Eddie Haas	Lost in 1st round
1981	70-70	5th	Andy Gilbert	Lost in 1st round
1982	69-75	8th	Andy Gilbert	not eligible
1983	81-64	3rd	Bobby Dews	Lost in 1st round

== Notable alumni ==
Name	Notability	References
Jim Acker	1980-1982	
Jose Alvarez		
Steve Bedrosian	1979,1980	
Jim Bouton	1978	
Joe Cowley		
Ken Dayley	1980	
Jeff Dedmon		
Brian Fisher		
Albert Hall	1981	
Terry Harper		
Glenn Hubbard	played in 1977	
Brook Jacoby		
Terry Leach		
Rufino Linares		
Craig McMurtry	1980-81	
Dale Murphy	1976	
Larry Owen	1977-78	
Gerald Perry	1981	
Rafael Ramirez		
Paul Runge		
Milt Thompson		
Tom Waddell		
Paul Zuvella		

== See also ==
- Savannah Indians
- Savannah Sand Gnats
