= Montgomery Rebels =

- 1903–1980; (1903–1914; 1916; 1926–1930; 1932; 1937–1943; 1946–1962; 1965–1980); Montgomery, Alabama

Minor league affiliations
- Previous classes: AA (1965–1980); D (1957–1962); AA (1956); A (1951–1956); B (1946–1950); A1 (1943); B (1926–1930, 1932, 1937–1942); C (1916); A (1903–1914); C (1899); B (1892–1896, 1898)
- Previous leagues: Southern League (1972–1980); Dixie Association (1971); Southern League (1965–1970); Alabama–Florida League (1957–1962); Southern Association (1956); South Atlantic League (1951–1956); Southeastern League (1946–1950); Southern Association (1943); Southeastern League (1926–1930, 1932, 1937–1942); South Atlantic League (1916); Southern Association (1903–1914); Interstate League (1903); Southern League (1892–1896, 1898–1899)

Major league affiliations
- Previous teams: Detroit Tigers (1947; 1953; 1956–1962; 1965–1980); Boston Red Sox (1955); St. Louis Cardinals (1950); Washington Senators (1943); Pittsburgh Pirates (1938); Cleveland Indians (1937)

Minor league titles
- League titles (12): 1928; 1929; 1942; 1947; 1948; 1951; 1952; 1972; 1973; 1975; 1976; 1977

Team data
- Previous names: Montgomery Rebels (1954–1962, 1965–1980); Montgomery Bombers (1937); Montgomery Capitals (1932); Montgomery Lions (1926–1930); Montgomery Rebels (1912–1914, 1916); Montgomery Billikens (1911); Montgomery Climbers (1909–1910); Montgomery Senators (1904–1908); Montgomery Black Sox (1903); Montgomery Senators (1896, 1898–1899); Montgomery Grays (1895); Montgomery Colts (1893); Montgomery Lambs (1892)
- Previous parks: Paterson Field (1950–1962; 1965–1980)

The Montgomery Rebels was the name of several American minor league baseball franchises representing Montgomery, Alabama, playing in various leagues between 1912 and 1980. Rebels was the predominant nickname of the Montgomery teams, but it was not the original moniker, and it was one of several used by the city's 20th century professional baseball teams, which began play in organized baseball in 1903. Others included the Billikens, Bombers, Capitals, Climbers, Grays, Lambs, Lions and Senators.

Before the last Rebels team moved to Birmingham, Alabama as the current Birmingham Barons in 1981, the Rebels spent 16 consecutive seasons, 1965 through 1980, as the Double-A Southern League affiliate of the Detroit Tigers. Earlier, Montgomery had been a member of the Southern Association (1903–1914, and parts of 1943 and 1956), Sally League (1916, 1951 to early 1956), Southeastern League (1926–1930; 1932; 1937–1942; 1946–1950), and the Alabama–Florida League (1957–1962).

From 1950 through 1980, Montgomery played at Paterson Field (originally Municipal Stadium). It won 12 championships between 1928 and 1977, including five Southern League titles in six years (1972–1973; 1975–1977). The Tigers served as the Rebels' primary Major League Baseball parent, sponsoring the team in the Southeastern, Sally and Alabama-Florida leagues, as well as in the SL.

The Montgomery Biscuits have represented Alabama's capital in the Southern League since the 2004 season.

== Notable alumni ==
- Dave Campbell
- Pat Dobson
- Dick Drago
- Mark Fidrych
- Pat Jarvis
- Steve Kemp
- Lerrin LaGrow
- Jim Leyland
- Mike Marshall
- Jack Morris
- Lance Parrish
- Albie Pearson
- Dan Petry
- Rich Reese
- Jim Rooker
- Vern Ruhle
- Jason Thompson
- Alan Trammell
- Earl Weaver
- Lou Whitaker
- Earl Wilson
- Glenn Wilson

Preceded by Knoxville Smokies	Detroit Tigers; Double-A affiliate 1965–1980	Succeeded by Birmingham Barons
