= Columbus Astros =

- 1969–1990; Columbus, Georgia

Minor league affiliations
- Class: Double-A (1969–1990)
- League: Southern League (1969–1990)

Major league affiliations
- Team: Houston Astros (1970–1990); Chicago White Sox (1969)

Minor league titles
- League titles (1): 1986
- Division titles (2): 1979; 1986
- First-half titles (1): 1985
- Second-half titles (2): 1979; 1986

Team data
- Name: Columbus Mudcats (1989–1990); Columbus Astros (1970–1988); Columbus White Sox (1969)
- Ballpark: Golden Park (1969–1990)

The Columbus Astros were a Minor League Baseball team that played in the Double-A Southern League from 1969 to 1990. They were located in Columbus, Georgia, and played their home games at Golden Park. Founded as the Columbus White Sox in 1969, they were named for their Major League Baseball affiliate, the Chicago White Sox. They became the Columbus Astros in 1970 upon affiliating with the Houston Astros. The Astros won their lone Southern League championship in 1986. Columbus rebranded as the Columbus Mudcats in 1989 for their final two years in Columbus, which began a trend of minor league teams rebranding to more exotic names.

The Southern League franchise was relocated to Zebulon, North Carolina, after the 1989 season where it continued as the Carolina Mudcats. Simultaneous to the move, Columbus became home to a Class A team of the South Atlantic League called the Columbus Indians.

== History ==
From 1964 to 1966, Columbus, Georgia, was home to the Columbus Confederate Yankees of the Double-A Southern League. After the 1966 season, the Southern League contracted from eight teams to six and Columbus left the circuit.

Columbus returned to the Southern League in 1969 as the Columbus White Sox in an affiliation with the Chicago White Sox. As did the Confederate Yankees, the Columbus White Sox played their home games at Golden Park.

They became known as the Columbus Astros in 1970 when their affiliation changed to the Houston Astros. The 1979 Astros qualified for the Southern League playoffs by winning the Second Half East Division title. They won the East Division title over the Charlotte O's, 2–0, but lost the Southern League championship to the Nashville Sounds, 3–1. Columbus returned to the playoffs in 1982, but they were defeated in the division series by the Jacksonville Suns, who had won both halves of the season. They won the 1985 first half title, but lost the East Division championship to second-half winners Charlotte.

The Astros returned to the playoffs in 1986 by virtue of a second half win. They took the East Division title from the Jacksonville Expos, 3–1, before winning the Southern League championship over the Huntsville Stars, 3–1.

Columbus became known as the Mudcats in 1989. The 1990 season was their final year in Columbus. Team owner Steve Byrant relocated the team to Zebulon, North Carolina, where it continued in the Southern League as the Carolina Mudcats. Columbus did not go without professional baseball—a Class A team of the South Atlantic League called the Columbus Indians began play at Golden Park in 1991.
