= 2010 in baseball =

The following are the baseball events of the year 2010 throughout the world.

== Champions ==
=== Major League Baseball ===
- Regular Season Champions

League	Eastern Division Champions	Central Division Champions	Western Division Champions	Wild Card Qualifier
American League	Tampa Bay Rays	Minnesota Twins	Texas Rangers	New York Yankees
National League	Philadelphia Phillies	Cincinnati Reds	San Francisco Giants	Atlanta Braves

- World Series Champions – San Francisco Giants
  - American League Champions – Texas Rangers
  - National League Champions – San Francisco Giants
- Postseason – October 7 to November 4

Division Series (ALDS, NLDS)
1	Tampa Bay	2
3	Texas	3
American League
2	Minnesota	0
4	NY Yankees	3
1	Philadelphia	3
3	Cincinnati	0
National League
2	San Francisco	3
4	Atlanta	1

League Championship Series (ALCS, NLCS)
3	Texas	4
4	NY Yankees	2
1	Philadelphia	2
2	San Francisco	4

World Series
AL3	Texas	1
NL2	San Francisco	4

Higher seed had home field advantage during Division Series and League Championship Series.
The National League champion has home field advantage during the World Series as a result of the NL victory in the All-Star Game.

=== Other Champions ===
- Minor League Baseball
  - AAA
    - Championship: Columbus Clippers (Cleveland)
      - International League: Columbus Clippers (Cleveland)
      - Pacific Coast League: Tacoma Rainiers (Seattle)
    - Mexican League: Saraperos de Saltillo
  - AA
    - Eastern League: Altoona Curve (Pittsburgh)
    - Southern League: Jacksonville Suns (Florida)
    - Texas League: Northwest Arkansas Naturals (Kansas City)
  - A
    - California League: San Jose Giants (San Francisco)
    - Carolina League: Potomac Nationals (Washington)
    - Florida State League: Tampa Yankees (New York, AL)
    - Midwest League: Lake County Captains (Cleveland)
    - South Atlantic League: Lakewood BlueClaws (Philadelphia)
    - New York–Penn League: Tri-City ValleyCats (Houston)
    - Northwest League: Everett AquaSox (Seattle)
  - Rookie
    - Appalachian League: Johnson City Cardinals (St. Louis)
    - Gulf Coast League: GF Phillies (Philadelphia)
    - Pioneer League: Helena Brewers (Milwaukee)
    - Arizona League: AZL Brewers (Milwaukee)
    - Dominican Summer League: DSL Giants (San Francisco)
    - Venezuelan Summer League: VSL Pirates (Pittsburgh)
  - Arizona Fall League: Scottsdale Scorpions
- Independent baseball leagues
  - American Association: Shreveport-Bossier Captains
  - Atlantic League: York Revolution
  - Canadian American Association: Québec Capitales
  - Frontier League: River City Rascals
  - Golden Baseball League: Chico Outlaws
  - Northern League: Fargo-Moorhead RedHawks
  - United League Baseball: Edinburg Roadrunners
- Amateur
  - College
    - College World Series: South Carolina
    - NCAA Division II: Southern Indiana
    - NCAA Division III: Illinois Wesleyan
    - NAIA: Cumberland
  - Japan high school
    - Spring Kōshien: Kōnan, Okinawa
    - Summer Kōshien: Kōnan, Okinawa
      - Kōnan becomes only the fifth school to sweep the country's two major high school tournaments in the same calendar year.
  - Youth
    - Big League World Series: San Juan, Puerto Rico
    - Junior League World Series: Taipei, Taiwan
    - Little League World Series: Tokyo, Japan
    - Senior League World Series: San Nicolaas, Aruba
- International
  - National teams
    - Intercontinental Cup: Cuba
    - European Baseball Championship: Italy
    - Central American and Caribbean Games: Dominican Republic
    - Asian Games: South Korea
    - South American Games: Venezuela
    - World Junior Baseball Championship: Chinese Taipei
    - Women's World Cup: Japan
  - International Club team competitions
    - Caribbean Series: Leones del Escogido (Dominican Republic)
    - European Champion Cup Final Four: Fortitudo Bologna (Italy)
    - KBO–NPB Championship: Chiba Lotte Marines (Japan)
- Central American Games: Panama
  - Domestic leagues
    - Australia – Claxton Shield: Victoria Aces
    - China Baseball League: Guangdong Leopards
    - Cuban National Series: Industriales
    - Dominican League: Leones del Escogido
    - France – Division Elite: Rouen Baseball 76
    - Holland Series: Neptunus
    - Italian Cup: Fortitudo Bologna
    - Japan Series: Chiba Lotte Marines
      - Central League: Chunichi Dragons
      - Pacific League: Chiba Lotte Marines
    - Korea Baseball Organization: SK Wyverns
    - Mexican League: Naranjeros de Hermosillo
    - Puerto Rican League: Indios de Mayagüez
    - Taiwan Series: Brother Elephants
    - Venezuelan League: Leones del Caracas

== Calendar ==
=== Major League Baseball ===
December

- December 4–7: Baseball winter meetings, Lake Buena Vista, Florida.
- December 12: Last day for teams to offer 2011 contracts to unsigned players.

Sources: Associated Press

== Awards and honors ==
- Baseball Hall of Fame honors
  - Three individuals were elected and subsequently inducted—Andre Dawson in voting by the Baseball Writers' Association of America, and umpire Doug Harvey and manager Whitey Herzog in voting by separate panels of the Veterans Committee.
  - Bill Madden received the J. G. Taylor Spink Award for excellence in writing.
  - Jon Miller received the Ford C. Frick Award for excellence in broadcasting.
- MVP Awards
  - American League – Josh Hamilton (TEX)
  - National League – Joey Votto (CIN)
- Cy Young Awards
  - American League – Félix Hernández (SEA)
  - National League – Roy Halladay (PHI)
- Rookie of the Year Awards
  - American League – Neftalí Feliz (TEX)
  - National League – Buster Posey (SF)
- Manager of the Year Awards
  - American League – Ron Gardenhire (MIN)
  - National League – Bud Black (SD)
- Silver Slugger Awards

American League			National League
Player	Team	Position	Player	Team
Vladimir Guerrero	Texas Rangers	DH / Pitcher	Yovani Gallardo	Milwaukee Brewers
Joe Mauer	Minnesota Twins	Catcher	Brian McCann	Atlanta Braves
Miguel Cabrera	Detroit Tigers	1st baseman	Albert Pujols	St. Louis Cardinals
Robinson Canó	New York Yankees	2nd baseman	Dan Uggla	Florida Marlins
Adrián Beltré	Boston Red Sox	3rd baseman	Ryan Zimmerman	Washington Nationals
Alexei Ramírez	Chicago White Sox	Shortstop	Troy Tulowitzki	Colorado Rockies
José Bautista	Toronto Blue Jays	Outfielder	Ryan Braun	Milwaukee Brewers
Carl Crawford	Tampa Bay Rays	Outfielder	Carlos González	Colorado Rockies
Josh Hamilton	Texas Rangers	Outfielder	Matt Holliday	St. Louis Cardinals

- Gold Glove Awards

American League			National League
Player	Team	Position	Player	Team
Mark Buehrle	Chicago White Sox	Pitcher	Bronson Arroyo	Cincinnati Reds
Joe Mauer	Minnesota Twins	Catcher	Yadier Molina	St. Louis Cardinals
Mark Teixeira	New York Yankees	1st baseman	Albert Pujols	St. Louis Cardinals
Robinson Canó	New York Yankees	2nd baseman	Brandon Phillips	Cincinnati Reds
Evan Longoria	Tampa Bay Rays	3rd baseman	Scott Rolen	Cincinnati Reds
Derek Jeter	New York Yankees	Shortstop	Troy Tulowitzki	Colorado Rockies
Carl Crawford	Tampa Bay Rays	Outfielder	Carlos González	Colorado Rockies
Franklin Gutiérrez	Seattle Mariners	Outfielder	Michael Bourn	Houston Astros
Ichiro Suzuki	Seattle Mariners	Outfielder	Shane Victorino	Philadelphia Phillies

=== Others ===
- Woman Executive of the Year (major or minor league): Sharon Ridley, Nashville Sounds, Pacific Coast League

Major Leagues

- Babe Ruth Award – Tim Lincecum (SF)
- Branch Rickey Award – Vernon Wells (TOR)
- DHL Delivery Man of the Year Award – Heath Bell (SD)
- Edgar Martínez Award – Vladimir Guerrero (TEX)
- Hutch Award – Tim Hudson (ATL)
- Luis Aparicio Award – Carlos González (COL)
- Roberto Clemente Award – Tim Wakefield (BOS)
- Tony Conigliaro Award – Joaquín Benoit (TB)
- Players Choice Awards
  - Player of the Year – Carlos González (COL)
  - Marvin Miller Man of the Year – Brandon Inge (DET)
  - Outstanding Players – Josh Hamilton (TEX, AL) / Carlos González (COL, NL)
  - Outstanding Pitchers – David Price (TB, AL) / Roy Halladay (PHI, NL)
  - Outstanding Rookies – Austin Jackson (DET, AL) / Buster Posey (SF, NL)
  - Comeback players of the year – Vladimir Guerrero (TEX, AL) / Tim Hudson (ATL, NL)
- Sporting News Awards
  - Player of the Year – Josh Hamilton (TEX)
  - Managers of the Year – Ron Gardenhire (MIN, AL) / Bud Black (SD, NL)
  - Pitchers of the Year – Félix Hernández (SEA, AL) / Roy Halladay (PHI, NL)
  - Rookies of the Year – Austin Jackson (DET, AL) / Jason Heyward (ATL, NL)
  - Comeback players of the year – Vladimir Guerrero (TEX, AL) / Tim Hudson (ATL, NL)
  - Relievers of the year – Rafael Soriano (TB, AL) / Heath Bell (SD, NL)
- Fielding Bible Awards

Player	Team	Position
Mark Buehrle	Chicago White Sox	Pitcher
Yadier Molina	St. Louis Cardinals	Catcher
Daric Barton	Oakland Athletics	1st baseman
Chase Utley	Philadelphia Phillies	2nd baseman
Evan Longoria	Tampa Bay Rays	3rd baseman
Troy Tulowitzki	Colorado Rockies	Shortstop
Brett Gardner	New York Yankees	Left fielder
Michael Bourn	Houston Astros	Center fielder
Ichiro Suzuki	Seattle Mariners	Right fielder

Minor Leagues

- Baseball America Minor League Player of the Year Award – Jeremy Hellickson (TB)
- USA Today Minor League Player of the Year Award – Jeremy Hellickson (TB)

== Events ==
=== January ===
- January 2 – Toronto Blue Jays third baseman Edwin Encarnación is discharged from a Miami, Florida, hospital after suffering first- and second-degree burns to his face when he gets hit by fireworks during a New Year's celebration in his native La Romana, Dominican Republic. Encarnación is treated for minor facial injuries to the front and right side of his face after he is struck by a firecracker rocket near his jaw and it explodes. He goes to a local clinic in the Dominican Republic on the 1st, but is later transported to Miami, where he sees a face specialist for his injuries.
- January 4 – The New York Mets announce the official signing of Jason Bay to a four-year, $66 million contract, which includes a fifth-year vesting option. The two sides originally agree on the deal on December 29, 2009, however, it is not official until after Bay passes his physical.

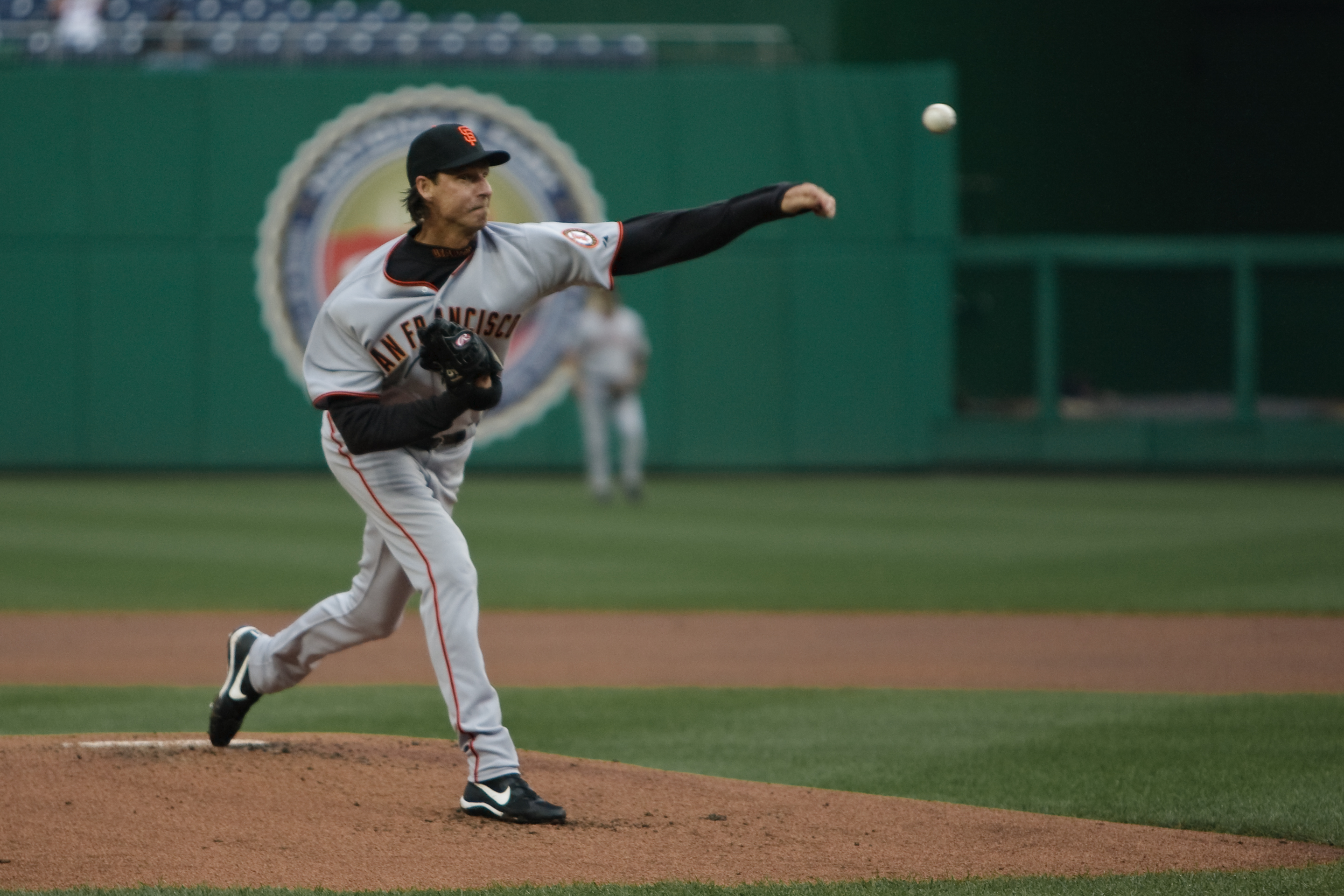
300 win club member Randy Johnson announced his retirement in January 2010.

- January 5
  - Five time Cy Young Award winner Randy Johnson announces his retirement. Johnson is 303–166 over his 22-year career, with a 3.29 earned run average. His 4,875 career strikeouts are second only to Hall of Famer Nolan Ryan.
  - The St. Louis Cardinals re-sign outfielder Matt Holliday to a seven-year deal with an option for 2017, for a guaranteed $120 million. It is the richest contract in Cardinals history.
- January 7 – The Seattle Mariners acquire first baseman Casey Kotchman from the Boston Red Sox in exchange for outfielder Bill Hall.
- January 11
  - 21-year-old Cuban defector Aroldis Chapman signs with the Cincinnati Reds.
  - In an afternoon statement to news outlets, Mark McGwire admits that he used steroids during much of his Major League career, including in 1998, when he broke Major League Baseball's single-season home run record. In the evening, he addresses the situation further in an interview with Bob Costas on MLB Network.

I wish it never came into my life. But we're sitting here talking about it. I'm so sorry that I have to. I apologize to everybody at Major League Baseball, my family, the Marises, Bud Selig... Today was the hardest day of my life.

- January 16 – The San Diego Padres acquire Scott Hairston and outfielder Aaron Cunningham from the Oakland Athletics for third baseman Kevin Kouzmanoff and Minor League infielder Eric Sogard. Two days later, the Padres reach an agreement with Jerry Hairston Jr. on a one-year deal. The Hairstons become the seventh set of brothers to play for the Padres and the fifth to play as teammates.
- January 22
  - Oakland Athletics farmhand Grant Desme retires after a 30/30 2009 season in the minors and being named Arizona Fall League MVP in order to pursue the priesthood.
  - The New York Mets acquire former All-Star outfielder Gary Matthews Jr. from the Los Angeles Angels in exchange for reliever Brian Stokes and cash considerations.
- January 23 – Nolan Ryan and Pittsburgh attorney Chuck Greenberg complete the initial step of purchasing controlling interest in the Texas Rangers from Tom Hicks and the Hicks Sports Group.
- January 28 – Minnesota Twins pitcher Francisco Liriano strikes out ten batters over five scoreless innings to lead Leones del Escogido to a 5–3 win over Gigantes del Cibao for the Dominican Republic League title in the deciding ninth game of the series. The Dominicans become the first squad to qualify for the 2010 Caribbean Series.
- January 29
  - In Puerto Rico, Boston Red Sox minor leaguer Ángel Sánchez goes 4-for-6 with two runs scored and an RBI to pace Indios de Mayagüez past the Criollos de Caguas, 8–6, in 11 innings to claim their first league championship since 2005 and a berth in the Caribbean Series tournament.
  - Leones del Caracas cruises past Navegantes del Magallanes, 7–2, in decisive Game 7 of the Venezuelan winter league championship to claim the title and earn a berth in the Caribbean Series. The Venezuelan team is led by Atlanta Braves outfielder Gregor Blanco, who hits .318 with a .538 OBP and a .652 slugging, who is named Most Valuable Player.
- January 30 – In Mexico, the Naranjeros de Hermosillo joins Winter League championship teams from Venezuela, the Dominican Republic and Puerto Rico in the double round-robin format tournament after edging the Venados de Mazatlán, 1–0, in Game 7 of the league championship series. Juan Delgadillo pitches 7 2/3 shutout innings to out duel San Diego Padres right-hander Walter Silva. The game's only run scores in the first inning on a Vinny Castilla sacrifice fly after Chris Roberson triples to lead off the game. The six-day Caribbean Series is set to begin February 2 on the Venezuelan island of Margarita.

=== February ===
- February 4 – The Detroit Tigers re-sign ace RHP Justin Verlander to an $80 million, 5-year contract extension.
- February 7 – Dominican team Leones del Escogido wins the 2010 Caribbean Series. The Dominicans finish the tournament with a 5–1 record, while Puerto Rico's Mayagüez team places second (4–2), Mexico's Hermosillo squad third (2–4), and Venezuela's Caracas club in last place (1–5). Dominican outfielder Fernando Martínez earns the series MVP award and Mako Oliveras from Puerto Rico is named the best manager.
- February 8
  - The Chicago White Sox unretire Hall of Fame shortstop Luis Aparicio's number 11, which is worn by Aparicio's friend and fellow Venezuelan Omar Vizquel.
  - The Hall of Fame holds a second annual Hall of Fame Classic at Doubleday Field on Father's Day on June 20. The Hall began a Father's Day weekend last June, with five Hall of Famers and more than 20 other former major leaguers. The game replaced the annual exhibition game between major league teams, which was discontinued because it became too difficult to fit into the regular-season schedule. This year's seven-inning exhibition game features Hall of Famers Gary Carter, Bob Feller, Rollie Fingers, Goose Gossage, Harmon Killebrew, Phil Niekro and Mike Schmidt.

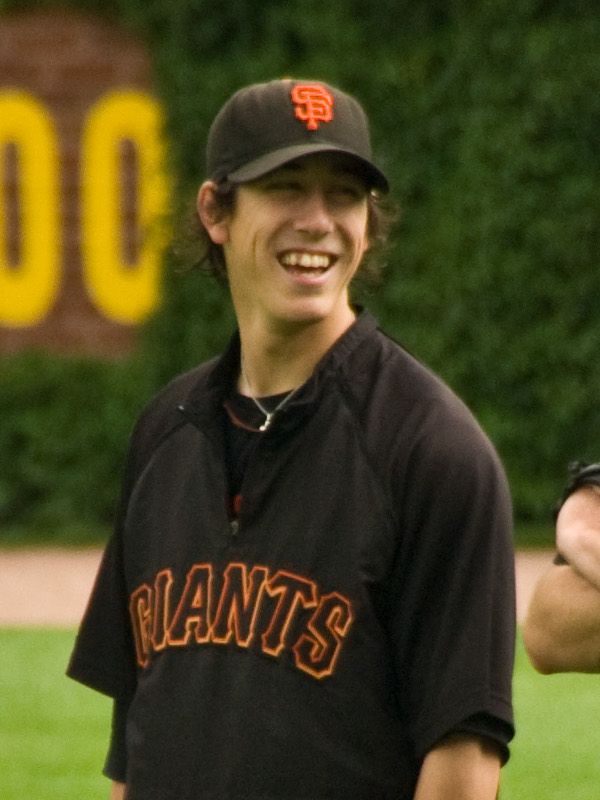
Lincecum and the Giants agree on a 2-year, $23 million deal

- February 11
  - Tom Glavine retires after 22 major league seasons and accepts a front office job with the Atlanta Braves. The 300-game winner pitched at the major league level in 2008, and became eligible for the Hall of Fame in 2014, alongside longtime Braves teammate and fellow 300-game winner Greg Maddux.
  - After sitting out the entire 2009 season, Frank Thomas announces his official retirement from baseball.
- February 12
  - Tim Lincecum and the San Francisco Giants avoid arbitration, and agree on a two-year, $23 million deal that takes him through the 2011 season.
  - Texas Rangers pitching prospects Omar Beltré, 28, and Alexi Ogando, 26, are granted visas, and allowed to attend Spring training, arriving in the U.S. on the 16th. The two players had previously confessed to involvement in a human trafficking ring in the Dominican Republic in 2004, and had been subsequently banned from entering the United States for five years, limiting them to winter ball, the Dominican Summer League and international tournaments.
- February 22
  - Johnny Damon joins the Detroit Tigers, signing a one-year, $8 million contract.
  - British rugby league player Terry Newton is the first professional athlete suspended for testing positive for human growth hormone. The blood test has been in existence since the 2004 Summer Olympics, but baseball officials say that its validity is not universally accepted by the scientific community, until now. Bud Selig introduces a plan to test minor leaguers for HGH shortly afterwards.
- February 23 – Aaron Boone announces his retirement.
- February 25 – The Texas Rangers void the contract of off-season acquisition Khalil Greene, who does not report to Spring training due to social anxiety disorder. Greene went on the disabled list twice during the 2009 season while with the St. Louis Cardinals due to his disorder.
- February 26 – Female pitcher Eri Yoshida, formerly of the Kobe 9 Cruise in the Kansai Independent Baseball League in Japan, is drafted by the Chico Outlaws of the Golden Baseball League. She is introduced as a member of the team on May 7, less than two weeks after graduating from high school and only a few hours after she lands in San Francisco following a flight from Tokyo. She becomes the first woman to play at the professional level in an American baseball league alongside men since Ila Borders and the first to play in professional baseball in two countries.

=== March ===
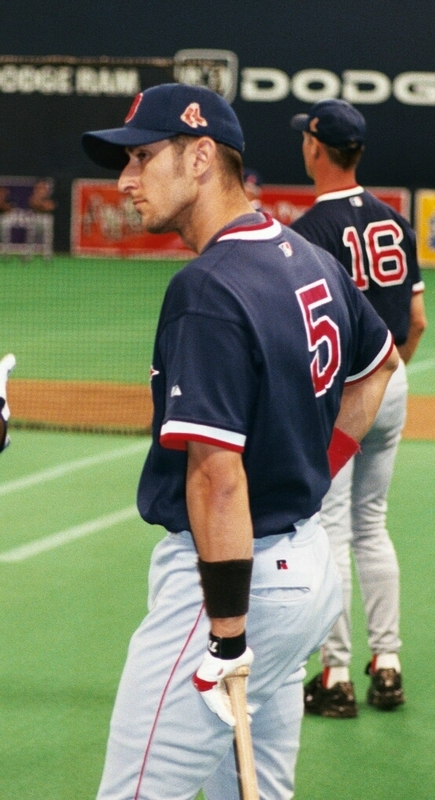
Garciaparra, with the Red Sox in 2002, retired as a member of the Red Sox during Spring training 2010

- March 2 – Major League Baseball 2K10 video game published by 2K Sports is released for Microsoft Windows, Xbox 360, PlayStation 3, PlayStation 2, PlayStation Portable, Wii and Nintendo DS. The cover features Evan Longoria of the Tampa Bay Rays.
- March 10 – Nomar Garciaparra signs a one-day contract with the Boston Red Sox, and announces his retirement from baseball as a member of his original franchise at City of Palms Park in Fort Myers, Florida, before the Sox's Spring training game against the Tampa Bay Rays. Garciaparra then threw out the ceremonial first pitch to his teammate at both Georgia Tech and with the Red Sox, Jason Varitek.
- March 11 – Outfielder Brian Giles announces his retirement a month after signing a Minor League contract with the Los Angeles Dodgers.
- March 16
  - Though John Smoltz has yet to officially retire, Turner Sports announces that Smoltz will serve as one of their guest analysts for national broadcasts and will serve the same role for the 45 Atlanta Braves games that Peachtree Television will broadcast this season. Smoltz also joined the MLB Network's on-air roster the same day.
  - Former major league infielder Chuck Knoblauch pleads guilty to misdemeanor assault on his common-law wife. Knoblauch entered his plea in exchange for deferred-adjudication probation. He was also fined $1,000.
- March 17 – Texas Rangers manager Ron Washington calls a press conference apologizing for using and testing positive for cocaine during the first half of the 2009 season. A day later, Washington admits to having smoked marijuana and taken amphetamines during his playing career.
- March 18 – Major League Baseball announces that the Florida Marlins and New York Mets' three-game set on June 28–30 has been moved from Miami to San Juan, Puerto Rico.
- March 21 – Reigning American League MVP Joe Mauer signs an eight-year, $184 million contract extension with the Minnesota Twins that will take him through the 2018 season.
- March 23
  - Dwight Gooden is charged with driving under the influence of drugs and leaving the scene of a two-vehicle accident around 9 A.M. in Franklin Lakes, New Jersey. Gooden had a child in his vehicle at the time of the crash.
  - Jose Canseco announces on Twitter that the FBI was about to visit his house and that he has been subpoenaed to appear before a grand jury investigating whether Roger Clemens lied to Congress when he denied using performance-enhancing drugs.
- March 31 – Minnesota Twins outfielder Denard Span hits his mother, Wanda Wilson, in the chest with a foul ball in the top of the first inning of an exhibition game with the New York Yankees at George M. Steinbrenner Field. Paramedics checked on Wilson, who declined to go to a local hospital.

=== April ===
- April 2 – The Minnesota Twins open their new stadium, Target Field, losing a spring training game against the St. Louis Cardinals, 8–4.
- April 4 – At Fenway Park, the Boston Red Sox and the New York Yankees open the 2010 baseball season. Boston comes back from a 5–1 deficit with a 9–7 victory.
- April 5 – Atlanta Braves rookie Jason Heyward hits a 451-foot home run in the first at-bat of his career.
- April 7 – San Francisco Giants outfielder Eugenio Vélez enters the seventh inning of the Giants' 10–4 victory over the Houston Astros at Minute Maid Park wearing a jersey with a pair of letters transposed. No one noticed his uniform read "San Francicso" until after the game had already ended.
- April 11 – 2009 Major League Baseball draft #1 pick Stephen Strasburg strikes out eight in five innings to earn the win in his professional debut with the Harrisburg Senators.
- April 12 – In the first regular season game at Target Field, the Minnesota Twins defeat the Boston Red Sox, 5–2. Carl Pavano earned the first victory and Jason Kubel hit the first home run, while Marco Scutaro of the Red Sox got the ballpark's first official hit, a single in the first inning.
- April 14 – Jorge Cantú of the Florida Marlins hits a home run, making him the first player in major league history to have at least one hit and one RBI in each of his team's first nine games, and the Marlins beat the Cincinnati Reds 5–3. Cantú entered the game tied with George Kelly of the 1921 New York Giants with at least one hit and RBI in the opening eight games, according to the Elias Sports Bureau.
- April 16 – Jorge Cantú's string of collecting at least one hit and one RBI for the Florida Marlins ends at ten games. His hitting streak, however, reaches an 11th game in Florida's 8–6 loss to the Philadelphia Phillies at Citizens Bank Park.
- April 17
  - New York Yankees third baseman Alex Rodriguez hits his 584th career home run in a Yankees' 7–3 victory over the Texas Rangers at Yankee Stadium. Rodriguez passes Mark McGwire for eighth place on the all-time home run list.
  - At Turner Field, Ubaldo Jiménez of the Colorado Rockies tosses the first no-hitter in franchise history, defeating the Atlanta Braves 4–0. Jiménez also drives in a run, a fourth-inning single that scores Brad Hawpe, to help his own cause.
  - The New York Mets and St. Louis Cardinals play eighteen innings at Busch Stadium without scoring a run. In the nineteenth inning, the Mets finally score a run on a sacrifice fly by Jeff Francoeur, only to have the Cardinals tie the game in the bottom of the inning on a double by Albert Pujols and a RBI-single by Yadier Molina. The Mets score again in the twentieth on a sacrifice fly by José Reyes to win the game, 2–1. The Mets use 24 of the 25 men on their roster. The only player not used is the previous day's starter, Óliver Pérez, while the Cardinals use 22. Mets closer Francisco Rodríguez blows the save, but is credited with the win. Mets starter Mike Pelfrey earns his first career save, and the losing pitcher is Cardinals left fielder Joe Mather.
- April 18 – At Nationals Park, the Milwaukee Brewers score ten runs in the first inning of their 11–7 victory over the Washington Nationals. It is the first time in Brewers history they accomplished such a feat. Nationals starter Jason Marquis allows seven earned runs on four hits, two hit batters and one walk and never retires a batter, making him the fifth pitcher since 1969 to allow seven earned runs at home without recording an out. The last was the Cincinnati Reds' Paul Wilson in 2005.
- April 20 – At Fenway Park, Darnell McDonald pinch-hits a two-run home run to tie the game in the eight inning and a walk-off single in the ninth to push the Boston Red Sox to a 7–6 victory over the Texas Rangers. McDonald also became the first ever member of the Red Sox to collect a game-ending RBI in his debut with the club, according to the Elias Sports Bureau.
- April 21 – The Chicago Cubs confirm reports that manager Lou Piniella is moving struggling starter Carlos Zambrano to the bullpen, in a move that may not be temporary. Zambrano is 1–2 with a 7.45 ERA in four starts, and the move makes room for Ted Lilly, who is returning to the Cubs' starting rotation after undergoing offseason shoulder surgery. Piniella announced the movement one day after a 4–0 loss to the New York Mets, in which Zambrano pitched six innings and gave up two earned runs, while the Cubs bullpen gave up two, bringing the bullpen's ERA to 6.15.

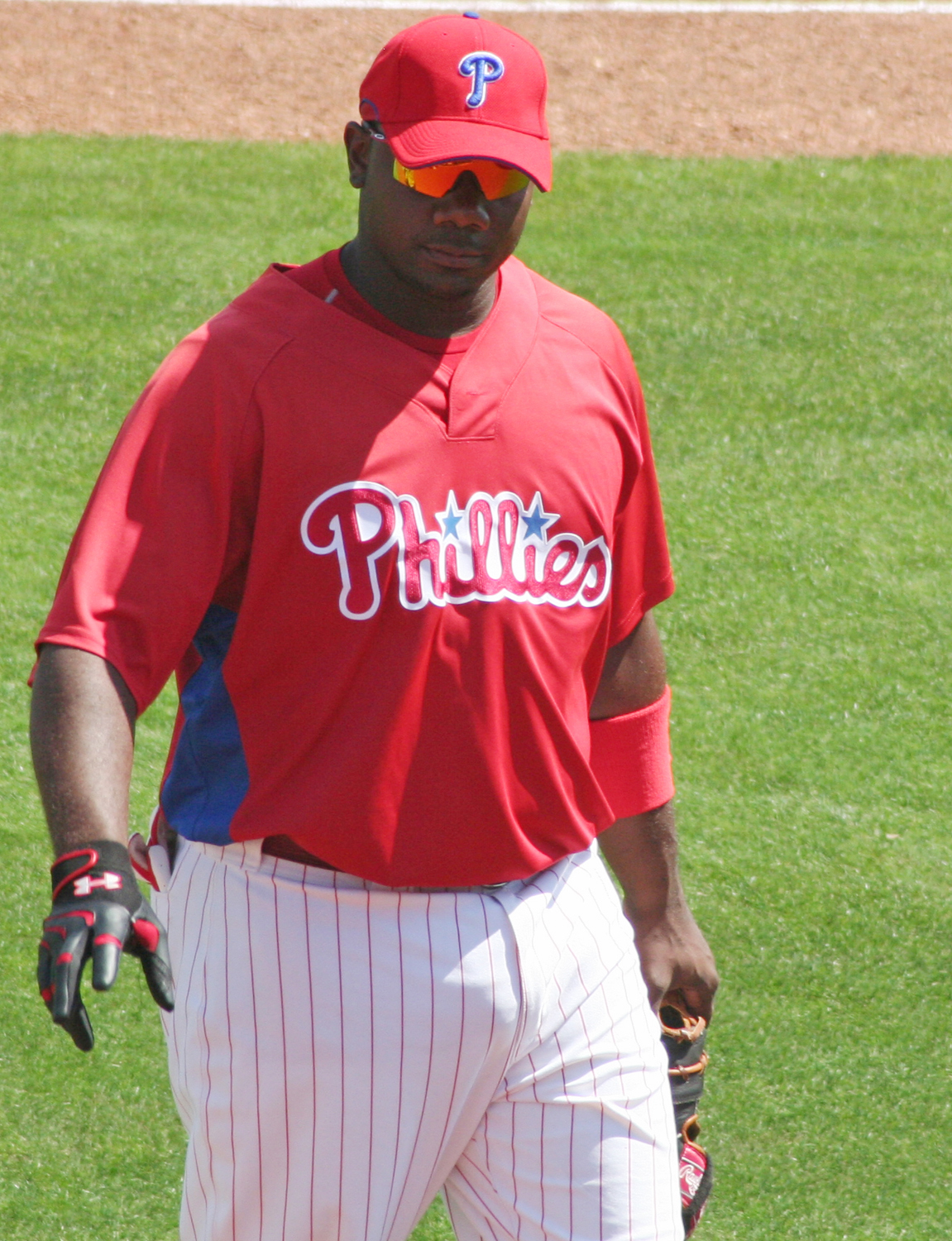
Ryan Howard signed a five-year, $125 million contract extension with the Phillies on April 26

- April 22
  - At PNC Park, the Milwaukee Brewers pound the Pittsburgh Pirates, 20–0, for the largest margin of defeat in the Pirates' 124-year history. Among the Brewers' 25 hits are home runs by Prince Fielder, Ryan Braun, George Kottaras and Jim Edmonds.
  - The New York Yankees turn the first triple play of the season, and the first one in franchise history since 1968, in a 4–2 loss to the Oakland Athletics.
- April 24 – Ted Lilly pitches six shutout innings in his season debut, Carlos Zambrano made his first appearance out of the bullpen in almost eight years, and the Chicago Cubs beat the Milwaukee Brewers, 5–1, at Miller Park. Lilly struck out four and walked two after being activated from the 15-day disabled list before the game. He was out while recovering from left shoulder surgery in November. Zambrano gave up a run in 1 1/3 innings and had a sacrifice fly in Chicago's three-run eighth.
- April 25 – David Price, the first overall pick of the 2007 MLB draft, pitches the first complete game and shutout of his career in a 6–0 Tampa Bay Rays victory win at Tropicana Field against the Toronto Blue Jays. Besides, Jays catcher José Molina guns down a team-record, four Tampa Bay baserunners trying to steal against him, but to no avail.
- April 26 – The Philadelphia Phillies sign Ryan Howard to a five-year, $125 million contract extension that will keep Howard with the Phillies through 2016. It is the largest contract in Phillies history, and the third-largestaverage annual value of a contract ($25 million per year) in baseball history.
- April 28 – Commissioner Bud Selig's special committee for on-field matters expands All-Star rosters again, with each team bringing 34 players, with 13 pitchers per team, to the July 13 game at Angel Stadium in Anaheim, California, as part of several changes. Another change is that a pitcher who starts on the final Sunday before the All-Star break will be ineligible to pitch in the ASG and will be replaced on the roster. In addition, a designated hitter will be used in the ASG every year, including in National League cities; the AL's starting DH will continue to be elected by fans, and the NL's starting DH will be chosen by the NL All-Star manager. Under a change that runs contrary to normal baseball rules, each manager may designate a position player who will be eligible for re-entry to the game if the final position player, at any position, is injured.
- April 29 – A new report shows Major League Baseball equaled its best grades for racial and gender diversity hiring, even as the percentage of African American players dropped again in 2009, from 10.2 percent to 9 percent. The sport had made a small stride since reaching a low of 8.2 percent in 2007, but the latest data indicates a steady rise in the percentage of black players might be years away.
- April 30 – Johnny Damon becomes the 68th player to score 1,500 runs. He is driven in by Magglio Ordóñez' sacrifice fly.

=== May ===
- May 2 – Minnesota Twins catcher Wilson Ramos goes 4-for-5 with a double in his major league debut, to become the only Twin besides Kirby Puckett in 1984 to collect four hits in a major league debut, as well as the only catcher in modern history since 1900 to collect four hits in his MLB debut. Ramos followed his debut by going three-for-four and driving in his first run on May 3.
- May 3
  - New York Yankees second baseman Robinson Canó and Minnesota Twins starter Francisco Liriano are named the American League Player and Pitcher of the Month for April, respectively. Canó hit a Major League-best .400 batting average, including eight home runs, 21 runs scored and 18 RBI. Liriano went 3–0 and finished as the only AL starter with a sub-1.00 ERA (0.93) in 29 innings, which included a 23-inning scoreless streak.
  - During the eighth inning of the Phillies-Cardinals game, 17-year-old Steve Consalvi is tasered after storming the field at Citizens Bank Park.
  - Arizona Diamondbacks second baseman Kelly Johnson and Colorado Rockies starter Ubaldo Jiménez are named the National League Player of the Month and Pitcher of the Month, respectively, for April. Johnson hit .313 with 17 runs scored and 18 RBI, and also led the league with nine home runs and a slugging of .750. Jiménez, who posted a 5–0 record with 31 strikeouts and a 0.79 ERA in 34 1/3 innings of work, also hurled the first no-hitter in Rockies history.
- May 6 – The Round Rock Express debut a new pitcher named Billy Ray "Rojo" Johnson, who was actor Will Ferrell in disguise.
- May 7
  - At Citizens Bank Park, Jamie Moyer becomes the first pitcher to throw a shutout in four separate decades, giving up only two hits in the Philadelphia Phillies's 7–0 victory over the Atlanta Braves. At 47 years, 170 days old, Moyer is also the oldest pitcher to throw a Major League shutout, eclipsing Phil Niekro's record by almost a year. At 46 years, 188 days old, Niekro, while pitching for the New York Yankees, tossed a four-hit shutout against the Toronto Blue Jays on October 6, 1985; the shutout was also Niekro's 300th career victory.
  - Starlin Castro of the Chicago Cubs becomes the first player born in the 1990s to play in the majors. Castro arrives in historic style, hitting a three-run home run in his first at-bat and a bases-loaded triple, sliding head-first into the record books with six runs batted in, the most ever in a modern-day debut. Chicago defeats the Cincinnati Reds, 14–7, while the 20-year-old rookie becomes the youngest shortstop in Cubs history, surpassing Marty Shay, who was 100 days older when he made it to the majors in 1916.
- May 9 – On Mother's Day, with his grandmother in attendance, Dallas Braden of the Oakland Athletics pitches a 4–0 perfect game against the Tampa Bay Rays at Oakland–Alameda County Coliseum. The perfect game is the second in Athletic history. Catfish Hunter had thrown the first, 42 years and one day earlier, on May 8, 1968, also by a 4–0 score at Oakland–Alameda County Coliseum. It is also the first no-hitter by an Athletic pitcher since Dave Stewart in 1990, and the first complete game of Braden's career. The Tampa Bay Rays had been the victim of the last perfect game in the Majors, by Chicago White Sox pitcher Mark Buehrle on July 23, 2009.
- May 11 – Due to the pending G-20 Summit to be held in Toronto, Ontario, Canada that weekend, the Philadelphia Phillies–Toronto Blue Jays series is moved from Rogers Centre to Citizens Bank Park. For statistical purposes, the Blue Jays serve as the home team and use the designated hitter rule in this interleague series. This marks the first time the Phillies have played the Blue Jays in Toronto since the 1993 World Series.
- May 13
  - Mat Latos comes extremely close to pitching a no-hitter, but has to settle for a one-hit shutout and the first complete game of his career, as the San Diego Padres beats the San Francisco Giants, 1–0. The only hit Latos allows is a ground ball by Eli Whiteside in the 6th inning that glances off him towards third baseman Chase Headley, whose throw to first base is a fraction too late to retire Whiteside. For good measure, Latos also drives in the only run of the game.
  - Zack Greinke finally earns his first win of the year, but it comes too late to save Kansas City Royals manager Trey Hillman. The Royals announce after their 6–4 win over the Cleveland Indians that Hillman has been fired and will be replaced by former Milwaukee Brewers manager Ned Yost. At the time, the Royals are 12–23 and in a familiar last place in the AL Central Division.
- May 15 – In the fourth annual Civil Rights Game, the Cincinnati Reds defeat the St. Louis Cardinals, 4–3, at Great American Ball Park in Cincinnati.
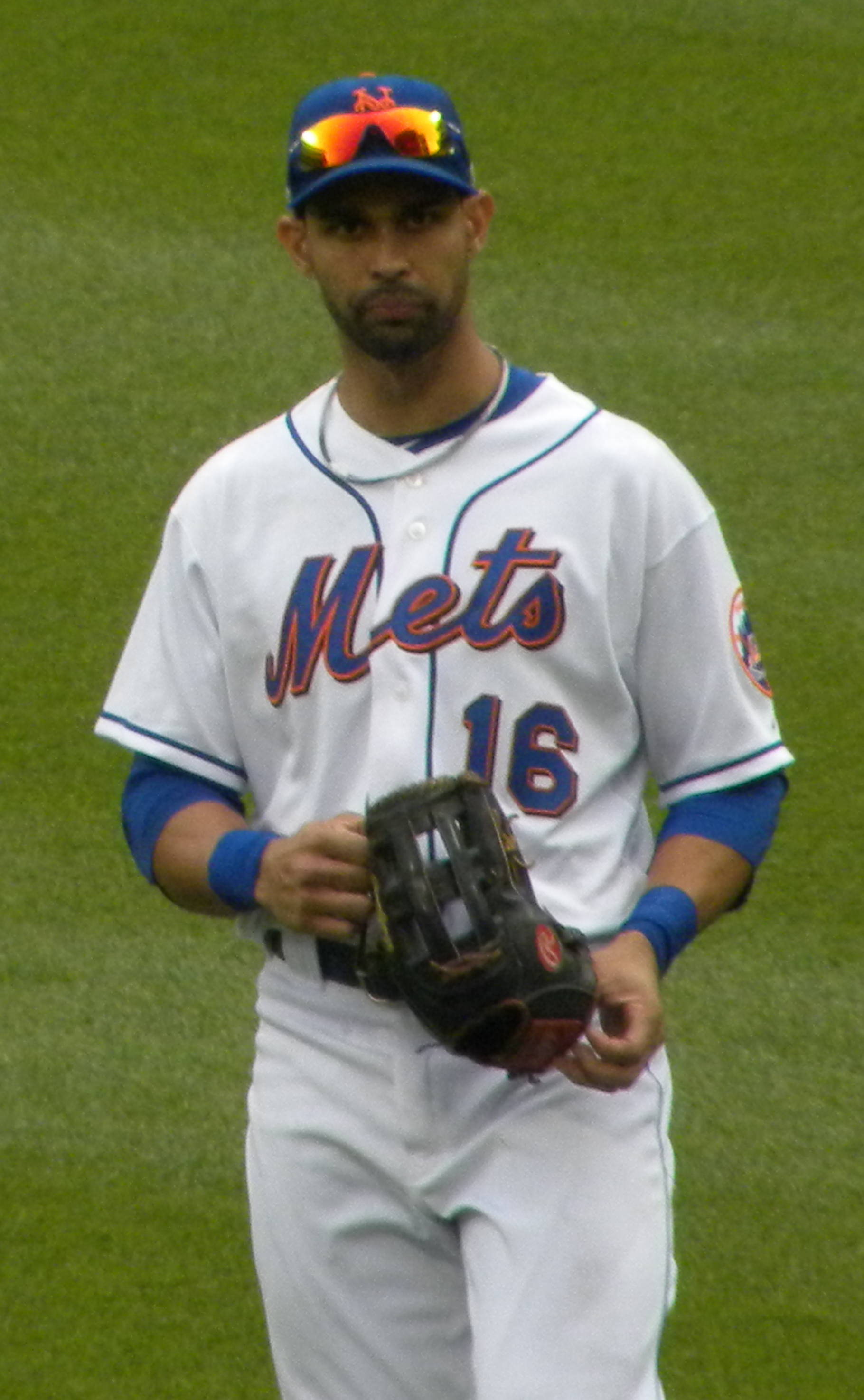
  Ángel Pagán
- May 19 – Center fielder Ángel Pagán hits an inside-the-park home run and starts a triple play, but it is not enough for the New York Mets in a 5–3 loss to the Washington Nationals. Pagán becomes the first player in 55 years to take part in both feats in the same game. Philadelphia Phillies shortstop Ted Kazanski was the last player to do both, on September 25, 1955 against the New York Giants.
- May 20 – After trailing 9–3 against the Reds, the Atlanta Braves score seven runs in the bottom of the 9th inning, all topped off by a walk-off grand slam from pinch hitter Brooks Conrad.
- May 27 – The New York Mets complete a three-game sweep of the Philadelphia Phillies in which Philadelphia is shut out all three games. The last time the Mets accomplished such a feat was September 26–28, 1969 also against the Phillies.
- May 29 – At Sun Life Stadium, Roy Halladay of the Philadelphia Phillies pitches a 1–0 perfect game against the Florida Marlins. With Oakland's Dallas Braden having pitched a perfect game on May 9, this season is the first in modern history to witness two perfect games. Halladay strikes out 11 in his masterpiece, the second perfect game in Phillies history. Jim Bunning had pitched the first, on June 21, 1964. The home plate umpire is Mike DiMuro, whose father Lou had been home plate umpire for Jim Palmer's no-hitter in 1969.
- May 30
  - Ubaldo Jiménez pitches a four-hitter to become the major's first 10-game winner this year, outpitching Tim Lincecum to lead the Colorado Rockies past the San Francisco Giants, 4–0, at Coors Field. Jiménez' record sits at 10–1 with a 0.78 ERA in eleven starts. Since the earned run statistic became official (1912 NL, 1913 AL), only other two pitchers have won at least 10 of their first 11 starts with ERAs under 1.00, Eddie Cicotte (11–0, 0.95) in 1919 and Juan Marichal (10–0, 0.80) in 1956.
  - Max Scherzer of the Detroit Tigers strikes out 14 Oakland Athletics batters in 5 2/3 innings. This is the most strikeouts for a pitcher in less than six innings of work dating back to 1920.

=== June ===
- June 1 – The Arizona Diamondbacks acquire pitcher Dontrelle Willis from the Detroit Tigers for right-handed reliever Billy Buckner.

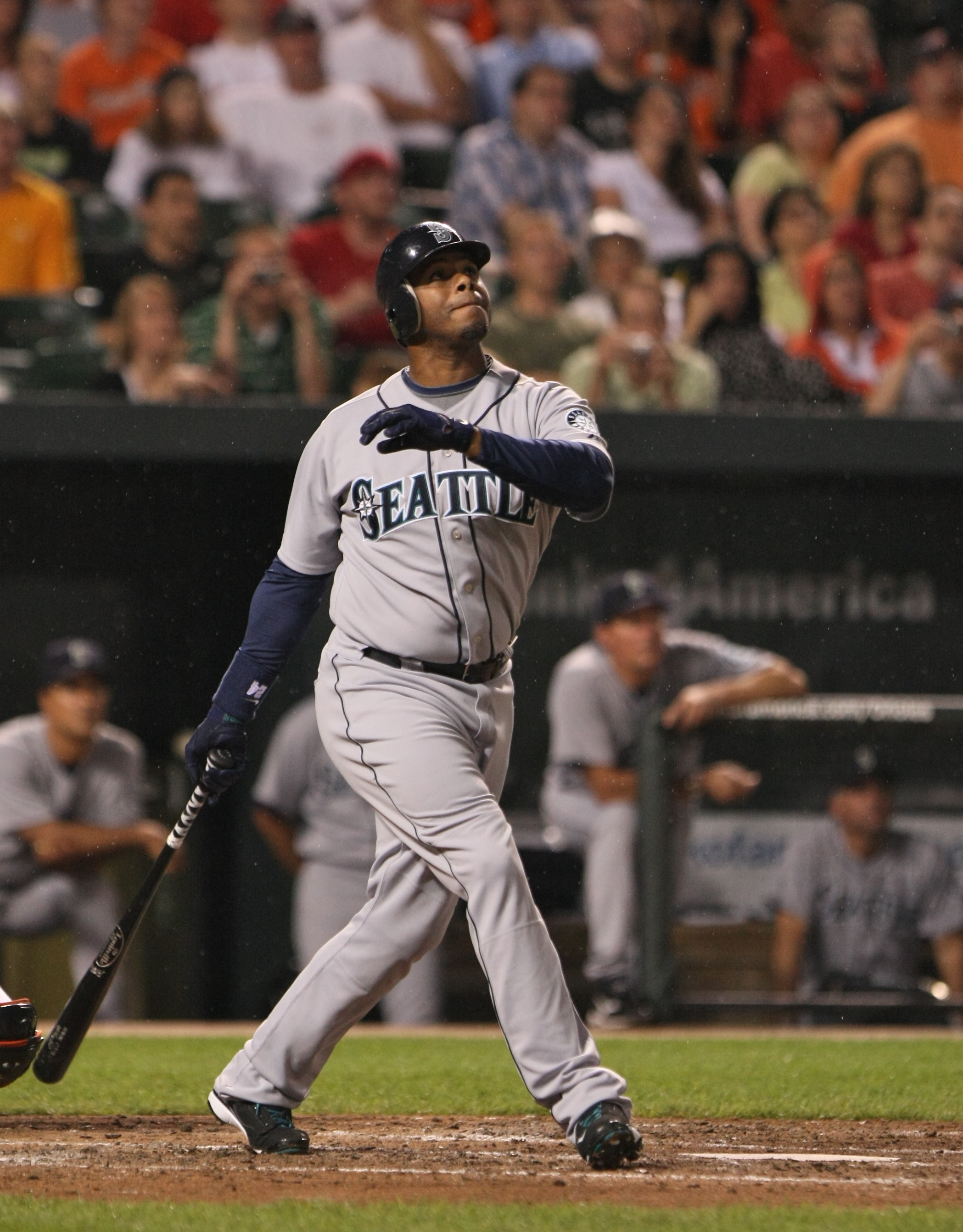
Ken Griffey Jr. announced his retirement on June 2, 2010

- June 2
  - After 22 seasons, Ken Griffey Jr. announces he is retiring, effective immediately.
  - Boston Red Sox designated hitter David Ortiz and starting pitcher Jon Lester earn American League Player and Pitcher of the Month, respectively, for May. Ortiz hit .363 (29–80) in 23 games, including four doubles, 10 home runs, 16 runs and 27 RBI. He also posted a Major League-best .788 slugging percentage and a .424 on-base percentage. Lester, who posted a perfect 5–0 record in six outings, allowed just 24 hits through 44.0 innings of work while leading the Majors with 45 strikeouts. His 1.84 ERA, was the lowest of any AL pitcher with more than 27 innings pitched, while his five wins in May boosted his career record to 48–18, and his .727 winning percentage is the best in ML history (since 1901) among pitchers with at least 50 decisions and the ninth-best winning percentage ever through a pitcher's first 100 starts. It is the fourth career Player of the Month Award for Ortiz and the third Pitcher of the Month honor for Lester. It marks the first time that the two AL monthly awards were captured by teammates in the same month since June 2006, when Joe Mauer and Johan Santana of the Minnesota Twins won the honors.
  - Atlanta Braves first baseman Troy Glaus and Colorado Rockies starting pitcher Ubaldo Jiménez are selected National League Player and Pitcher of the Month, respectively, for May. Glaus led the NL with 28 RBI, while hitting .330 (34–103) with six home runs, 17 runs and a .534 slugging percentage. The 2002 World Series Most Valuable Player finished the month riding a six-game hitting streak. Jiménez became the first pitcher in the majors to win the monthly award in April and May since Pedro Martínez of the Boston Red Sox did it in 1999. He also is the first NL pitcher to repeat the feat since John Smoltz of the Atlanta Braves did it in 1996. Jiménez ranked first in the NL in ERA (0.78) and was tied for first in victories (5) and innings pitched (46.0) for the month. On May 3 he struck out a career-high 13 batters in 7.0 innings of work against the San Diego Padres, and ended the month with 26.0 consecutive scoreless innings. This scoreless stretch marks the second time this season that Jiménez has pitched 25 or more consecutive innings of shutout ball.
  - Detroit Tigers pitcher Armando Galarraga comes within one out of throwing a perfect game. With two outs in the ninth inning, Cleveland Indians shortstop Jason Donald hits a soft ground ball to Tigers first baseman Miguel Cabrera, who tosses the ball to Galarraga covering first base. Though video replay showed that Galarraga beat Donald to the bag, first base umpire Jim Joyce calls Donald safe. Joyce is heckled by Tigers players and coaches for several minutes afterward, almost causing a brawl. The next batter, Trevor Crowe, grounds out to Brandon Inge, ending the game in a 3–0 victory for the Tigers. Later on Fox Sports Detroit's Tigers Live post-game show, Galarraga said Joyce apologized to him and gave him a hug.

I just cost that kid a perfect game, I thought he beat the throw. I was convinced he beat the throw, until I saw the replay.

- June 3 – After accumulating a league-worst 15–39 record, the Baltimore Orioles fire manager Dave Trembley. Third base coach Juan Samuel replaces him.
- June 5 – Florida International University shortstop Garrett Wittels extends his hitting streak to 56 games, the same number of Joe DiMaggio's 1941 major league record, and just two shy of Robin Ventura's NCAA record. The Golden Panthers are eliminated with a 15–9 loss to Dartmouth in the NCAA Coral Gables regional, therefore, Wittels will go into the 2011 season with the streak intact.
- June 7 – The Washington Nationals select College of Southern Nevada catcher/outfielder Bryce Harper with the first overall pick in the 2010 Major League Baseball draft. Also, Delino DeShields Jr., son of the former second baseman, is selected eighth overall by the Houston Astros. John Franco Jr. is selected by the New York Mets, the team for which his father pitched for 14 of his 20 seasons, in the 42nd round. The Los Angeles Dodgers select Andre Ethier's brother, Devon, in the 32nd round, the Detroit Tigers select Justin Verlander's brother, Benjamin, in the 46th round, and the Toronto Blue Jays select right-hander Gabriel Romero, brother of southpaw and former first-round draftee Ricky Romero in the 47th round. Reggie Golden, a product of Major League Baseball's RBI program (Reviving Baseball in Inner Cities, instituted with the hope of exposing more inner-city kids to the game), is selected in the second round by the Chicago Cubs. The New York Giants' Chad Jones and the Seattle Seahawks' Golden Tate were selected in the 50th round by the Milwaukee Brewers and San Francisco Giants, respectively.
- June 8 – Washington Nationals pitcher Stephen Strasburg makes his big league debut against the Pittsburgh Pirates, striking out fourteen, including his last seven, and not walking any over seven innings. The 2009 Major League Baseball draft #1 overall pick wins his MLB debut, 5–2.
- June 10 – At U.S. Cellular Field, Omar Vizquel of the Chicago White Sox hits a first-inning home run in a 3–0 victory over the Detroit Tigers. Vizquel joins Ted Williams, Willie McCovey, and Rickey Henderson as players who have hit home runs in four different decades.
- June 12 – At Fenway Park, Daniel Nava of the Boston Red Sox becomes the second player to hit a grand slam home run on the very first Major League pitch he sees. His shot comes off Joe Blanton in the second inning of the Red Sox' 10–2 victory over the Philadelphia Phillies. Kevin Kouzmanoff was the first player to hit a grand slam on the very first pitch he saw, which he did with the Cleveland Indians against the Texas Rangers on September 2, 2006.
- June 13
  - Jorge Posada clubs his second grand slam in two days in the New York Yankees' 9–5 victory over the Houston Astros. Posada becomes the first Major Leaguer to hit grand slams in back-to-back contests since Carlos Beltrán in 2006 and the first Yankee since Bill Dickey in 1937.
  - In an Interleague meeting between the two Chicago teams at Wrigley Field, both starting pitchers carry no-hitters into the seventh inning. The White Sox's Gavin Floyd has his bid for a no-hitter broken up with two out in the seventh by an Alfonso Soriano double. Soriano scores on Chad Tracy's single one batter later for the game's lone run. Ted Lilly's is broken up in the ninth by Ex-Cub Juan Pierre with a leadoff single. After Pierre's single, Lilly is relieved by Carlos Mármol, who loads the bases but hangs on for the save. Lilly would have been the first pitcher to throw a no-hitter at Wrigley Field since Milt Pappas in 1972.
- June 15 – The Oakland A's acquire outfielder Conor Jackson from the Arizona Diamondbacks for Minor League pitcher Sam Demel.
- June 23
  - The Florida Marlins dismiss manager Fredi González. Edwin Rodríguez, who has spent the past 1 1/2 seasons as manager of Triple-A New Orleans, takes over as manager on an interim basis. Also fired are bench coach Carlos Tosca and hitting coach Jim Presley. They are replaced on an interim basis by Brandon Hyde and John Mallee, respectively.
  - In his second game back from the DL, Jimmy Rollins of the Philadelphia Phillies hits the first ever walk-off home run of his career, beating the Cleveland Indians 7–6.
- June 25 – At Tropicana Field, Edwin Jackson of the Arizona Diamondbacks no-hits his former team, the Tampa Bay Rays, 1–0. Jackson survives a shaky start, walking seven batters in the first three innings (including walking the bases loaded in the third), and eight overall. The no-hitter is the second in Diamondbacks history, the other being Randy Johnson's perfect game on May 18, 2004. Jackson also becomes the first pitcher to no-hit a former team since Terry Mulholland of the Philadelphia Phillies no-hit the San Francisco Giants on August 15, 1990.
- June 27
  - At Citizens Bank Park, Jamie Moyer of the Philadelphia Phillies defeats the Toronto Blue Jays 11–2, but not before giving up a two-run home run to Vernon Wells in the third inning. The home run is the 506th Moyer has given up in his career, breaking the all-time record he had shared with Robin Roberts.
  - The Baltimore Orioles defeat the Washington Nationals, 4–3, becoming the first team since the 1901 Detroit Tigers to win four consecutive games after trailing by three runs or more in each game.
- June 29 – Denard Span of the Minnesota Twins collects 3 triples against the Detroit Tigers, the first player with 3 in a game since Rafael Furcal in 2002.

=== July ===
- July 1 – The Arizona Diamondbacks fire manager A. J. Hinch and general manager Josh Byrnes. Kirk Gibson takes over as interim manager and Jerry Dipoto becomes interim general manager.
- July 3 – At Target Field, Jim Thome of the Minnesota Twins hits two home runs in an 8–6 loss to the Tampa Bay Rays. The home runs give Thome 574 on his career, moving him past Harmon Killebrew into 10th place on the all-time home run list.
- July 6
  - Texas Rangers outfielder Josh Hamilton and Seattle Mariners pitcher Cliff Lee earn American League Player and Pitcher of the Month, respectively, for June. Hamilton led all Major League batters with a .454 average. That, combined with 10 doubles, nine homers a club-record 49 hits and a 23-game hitting streak, secured the honor for Hamilton. He capped his monster month by officially hitting the longest home run in the history of Rangers Ballpark, in a June 27 game against the Astros. Lee, who posted a 4–1 record with a 1.76 ERA, struck out 36 batters while walking only two. At one point, he completed a streak of 38 1/3 innings without giving up a walk.
  - New York Mets third baseman David Wright and Florida Marlins pitcher Josh Johnson are voted National League Player and Pitcher of the Month, respectively, for June. Wright led the league with a .404 average and 29 RBI, placed second in slugging (.683) and on-base percentage (.447), and was tied for third in doubles (11), while hitting six home runs and swiping four bases in 26 games. He also became the first player in Mets history to hit at least .400 with 25 or more RBI in a calendar month while recording a 29-RBI month for the second time in his career (June 2006). Johnson compiled a 3–1 record in five June starts with a 1.18 ERA, while striking out 38 in 38.0 innings and walking just six. His ERA was second-best among N.L. starters on the month while placing third in strikeouts. Johnson allowed no more than two earned runs in each of his starts this month and has not allowed more than two earned runs in nine-consecutive starts (dating back to June 13).

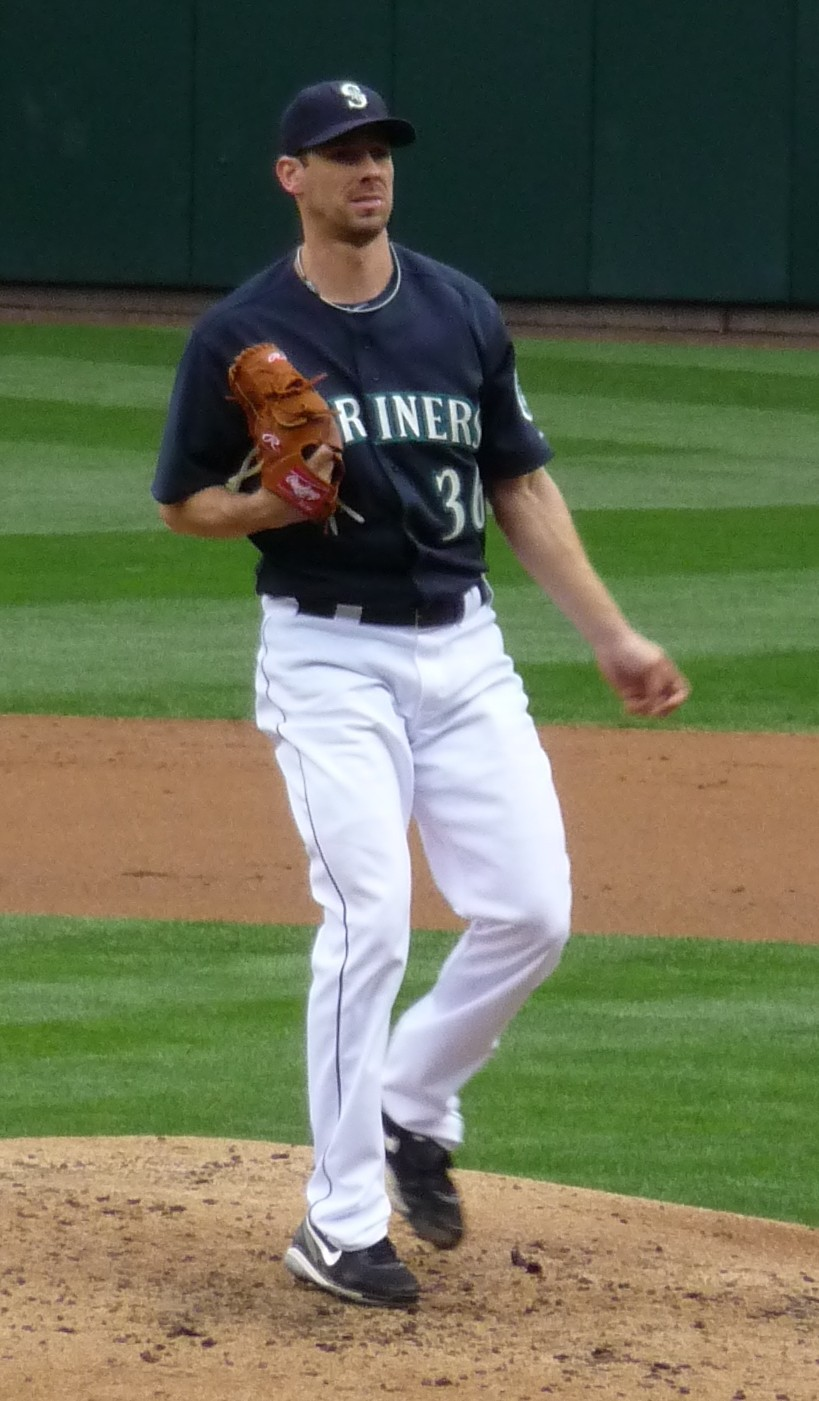
Cliff Lee & Mark Lowe go to the Texas Rangers for Justin Smoak & 3 pitching prospects

- July 9
  - The Texas Rangers acquire ace starting pitcher Cliff Lee and reliever Mark Lowe from the Seattle Mariners in exchange for first baseman Justin Smoak and three Minor League pitching prospects.
  - At Citizens Bank Park, the Philadelphia Phillies overcome a 7–1 deficit in the ninth inning to beat the Cincinnati Reds, 9–7. Cody Ransom hits a two-out, two-run homer to tie the game, and Ryan Howard wins it with a two-run walk-off homer in the 10th inning.
- July 13 – The National League wins its first All-Star Game since 1996. Atlanta Braves catcher Brian McCann wins the All Star MVP Award after driving in all 3 of the runs scored for the National League. The score was 3–1 and it was played at Angel Stadium in Anaheim. In the bottom of the first inning Yankees shortstop Derek Jeter is introduced by longtime Yankees public address announcer Bob Sheppard who died two days prior at the age of 99.
- July 16 – In the Texas Rangers' 8–4 victory over the Boston Red Sox at Fenway Park, Bengie Molina becomes the eighth player since 1900, and the first catcher, to hit a grand slam and hit for the cycle in the same game. His triple to complete the cycle comes in the eighth inning; he hits a fly ball to the deepest part of the park in center field, into the triangle, the ball glancing off center fielder Eric Patterson's glove. Molina becomes the first catcher to hit for the cycle since Chad Moeller on April 27, 2004, and the first visiting player to hit for the cycle at Fenway Park since Cleveland's Andre Thornton on April 2, 1978.
- July 20 – Los Angeles Dodgers pitcher Clayton Kershaw is accused of intentionally hitting Aaron Rowand of the San Francisco Giants and ejected from the game. Joe Torre and bench coach Bob Schaefer argue the call and are also ejected. The next day, Kershaw is suspended five games while Torre and Schaefer get one day suspensions.
- July 23 – Yankee catcher Jorge Posada records his 1,000th career RBI.
- July 26 – At Tropicana Field, Matt Garza of the Tampa Bay Rays no-hits the Detroit Tigers 5–0, the first no-hitter in Rays history. He faces the minimum 27 batters, yielding only a second-inning walk to Brennan Boesch, who is then retired on Ryan Raburn's double play ground ball. The opposing pitcher, Max Scherzer, also has a no-hitter going in the sixth inning until he walks the bases loaded and Matt Joyce hits a grand slam.
- July 30
  - At Coors Field, the Colorado Rockies set a Major League record with 11 consecutive base hits in a 17–2 pounding of the Chicago Cubs. With the Rockies leading 5–2, Clint Barmes opens up the eighth with a double and advances to third on Melvin Mora's pinch-single. After the next two batters, Dexter Fowler and Ryan Spilborghs, strike out, Carlos González singles in Barmes to begin the hit streak, which includes home runs by Chris Iannetta and Fowler. González and Troy Tulowitzki collect two hits during the streak, which ends after the latter's double scored Spilborghs and González for the Rockies' 11th and 12th runs of the inning, a franchise record. Brad Hawpe and Iannetta then walk to load the bases, and finally Ian Stewart flies out to end the inning.
  - One month after his no-hitter, the Arizona Diamondbacks trade Edwin Jackson to the Chicago White Sox for Daniel Hudson and David Holmberg. Jackson becomes the first pitcher to be traded after pitching a no-hitter earlier in the season since Cliff Chambers in 1951.
- July 31 – Carlos González hits a game-ending home run to complete the cycle, and the Colorado Rockies rally to beat the Chicago Cubs, 6–5, after blowing a three-run lead in the eighth inning. It is the fourth straight game for González with a homer, while his cycle is the sixth in Rockies history and fourth in the majors this season. Besides González, just four other players in MLB history have completed a cycle with a walk-off home run: Ken Boyer (1961), César Tovar (1972), George Brett (1979) and Dwight Evans (1984).

=== August ===
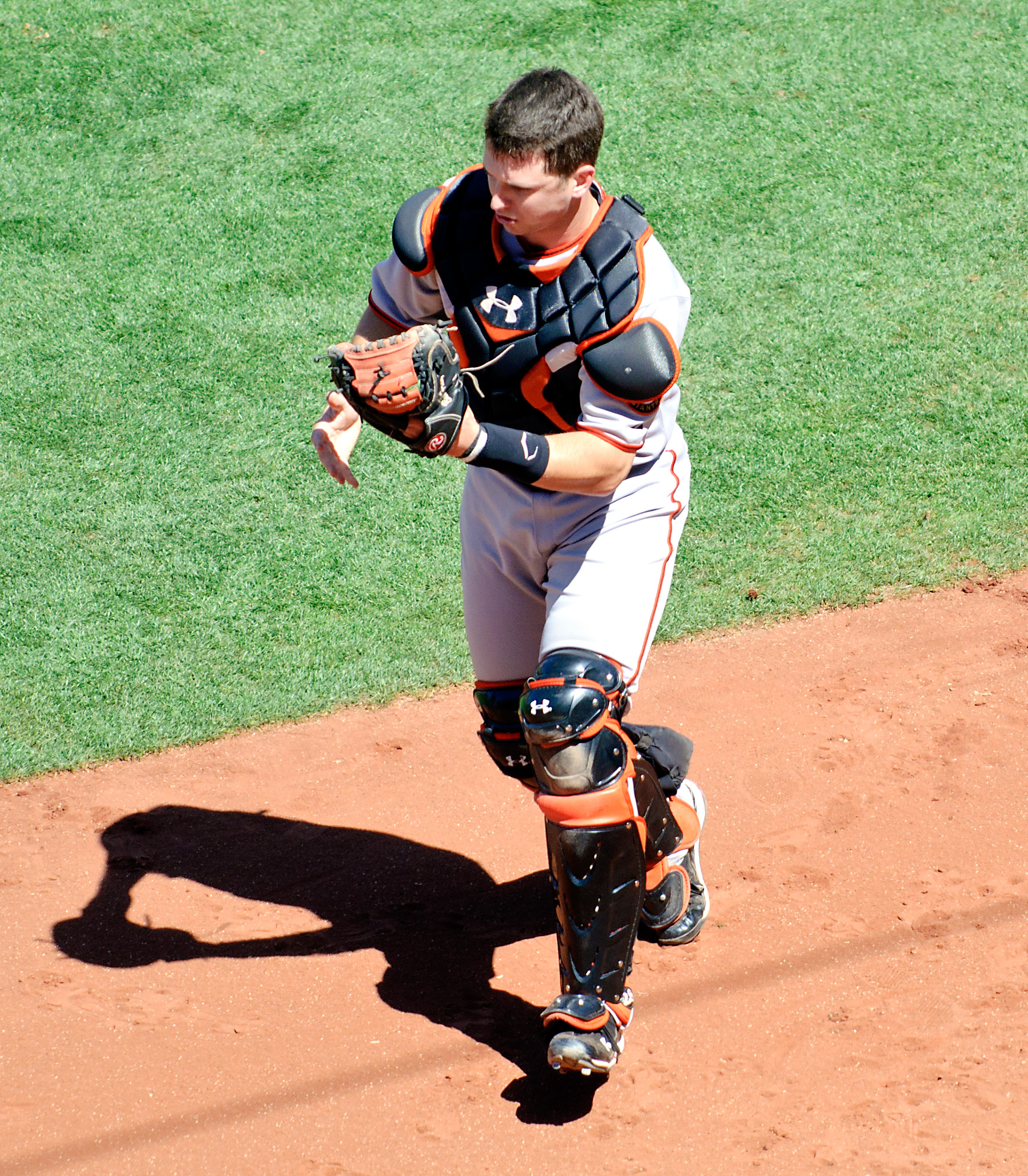
National League Player of the Month Buster Posey

- August 4:
  - At Yankee Stadium, Alex Rodriguez of the New York Yankees hits his 600th home run, becoming the seventh player in Major League history to do so, in a 5–1 victory over the Toronto Blue Jays. The shot comes in the first inning against the Jays' Shaun Marcum and three years to the day of Rodriguez' 500th home run. Rodriguez also becomes the youngest player to hit his 600th home run, at 35 years, 8 days; Babe Ruth had held the previous record at 36 years, 196 days.
  - San Francisco Giants rookie catcher Buster Posey and Philadelphia Phillies ace Roy Halladay are voted the National League Player and Pitcher of the Month, respectively, for July. Posey led the NL with 43 hits and ranked third with a .417 average (43-for-103). His 24 RBI were tied for third-best in the N.L., while his .466 on-base percentage and .699 slugging percentage ranked fourth and fifth in the league, respectively. He belted seven home runs, while his 21-game hitting streak from July 4–29 marked the longest streak in the NL this season. In five July starts, Halladay went 3–1 with a 1.54 ERA. His 39 strikeouts were good for second in the National League while his 41.0 innings pitched ranked fourth. He notched his Major League-leading eighth complete game of the season, while his 158 strikeouts and 2.17 ERA rank second in the Majors and his 13 wins are tied for fourth.
  - Toronto Blue Jays outfielder José Bautista and Minnesota Twins designated hitter Delmon Young are voted the American League Players of the Month for July, while Chicago White Sox starting pitcher Gavin Floyd has been voted the American League Pitcher of the Month for July. Bautista led the Majors with 11 home runs during July, marking the second time this season he has recorded the most home runs in a single month (12 in May). He also led the AL with a .765 slugging percentage and ranked third with 29 RBI while posting a .347 batting average with eight doubles and 20 runs scored, including a 10 multi-hit efforts during the month. Young paced the AL with 46 hits during the month, batting .434 (46-for-106), and tied for the league-lead with 12 doubles. He also finished second in the league with 30 RBI and collected six home runs with 17 runs scored while slugging .736, hitting safely in 23 of 26 games, and had multi-hit performances in 16 contests. Floyd posted a Major League-leading 0.80 ERA en route to a 3–1 mark over five starts in July. In 33.2 innings pitched, he allowed just three earned runs on 28 hits with seven walks and 25 strikeouts while holding opposing hitters to a .228 batting average. He earned victories in back-to-back home starts to begin the month, allowing just one earned run in each start. He later tossed 15 shutout innings and not allowed more than two earned runs in 11 consecutive outings. In addition, his 1.06 ERA since June 8 ranks first in the Majors ahead of San Diego Padres' Mat Latos (1.57).
- August 6 – In Detroit, the Angels' Torii Hunter gets ejected for arguing a strikeout. In a fit of rage, he throws a bag of balls on to the field. The next day, he is suspended four games.
- August 7 – The Blue Jays hit eight home runs in a 17–11 victory over the Rays. Leading the way is J. P. Arencibia with two in his Major League debut. Arencibia becomes the first player in the modern era to have four hits and two home runs in his major league debut.
- August 8 – At Rogers Centre, Brandon Morrow of the Toronto Blue Jays tosses his first shutout, first complete game with a career-high 17 strikeouts in a 1–0 victory over the Tampa Bay Rays. A two-out RBI-single by Vernon Wells in the first inning marks the difference. Morrow only allows a two-out single by Evan Longoria in the ninth inning. It marks the fifth time this season the Rays have taken one or zero hits in a single game, including a perfect game and one no-hitter. According to the Elias Sports Bureau, that is the most such games in a single season in the live ball era (since 1920). Eleven other teams have four such games in a season. Only twice in the modern era (since 1900) has a team been held to one hit or fewer in more than five games in a season. In 1910, the Chicago White Sox and St. Louis Browns both had six such games. To date, Dave Stieb has pitched the only no-hitter in Blue Jays history (September 2, 1990).
- August 9 – After accumulating an AL West-worst record (and third worst in all of baseball) of 42–70, the Seattle Mariners fire manager Don Wakamatsu, bench coach Ty Van Burkleo, pitching coach Rick Adair and performance coach Steve Hecht. They are replaced by Daren Brown, Roger Hansen, and Carl Willis, respectively.
- August 11 – The Arizona Diamondbacks tie a major league record by hitting four consecutive home runs, with Adam LaRoche, Miguel Montero, Mark Reynolds and Stephen Drew connecting in the fourth inning to beat the Milwaukee Brewers, 8–2, at Miller Park. The Diamondbacks became just the seventh team in major league history to accomplish the feat.
- August 17 – At Target Field, Jim Thome hits a two-run walk-off home run in the tenth inning to lift the Minnesota Twins over the Chicago White Sox, 7–6. It was the 12th walk-off home run of his career, tying him for first all time with Jimmie Foxx, Mickey Mantle, Stan Musial, Frank Robinson, and Babe Ruth (among others).
- August 18 – At Fenway Park, the Red Sox defeat the Angels, 7–5. By striking out the side in the ninth inning, Red Sox closer Jonathan Papelbon becomes the first pitcher to notch at least 30 saves in five consecutive major league seasons.
- August 19 – Former major league pitcher Roger Clemens is indicted by a federal grand jury on charges of lying to Congress over his use of performance-enhancing drugs.
- August 22 – Chicago Cubs manager Lou Piniella, who had previously announced that he would retire at the end of the season, announces his immediate retirement in order to care for his ailing mother.
- August 30 – The Chicago White Sox acquire slugger Manny Ramirez from the Los Angeles Dodgers off waivers.

=== September ===
- September 1 – Nyjer Morgan of the Washington Nationals charges the mound after Florida Marlins pitcher Chris Volstad throws behind him, starting a brawl. Morgan receives an eight-game suspension which he begins serving on September 17, while Volstad begins serving a six-game suspension on September 13.
- September 2
  - Toronto Blue Jays outfielder José Bautista and Boston Red Sox starting pitcher Clay Buchholz earn the American League Player and Pitcher of the Month, respectively, for August. Bautista led the league in home runs (12), runs batted in (24), slugging percentage (.724) and total bases (72), and tied for the lead in extra-base hits (18). This is the second career monthly award for Bautista, who shared last month's honor with Delmon Young of the Minnesota Twins. Buchholz went 4–0 with a 1.03 earned run average and 28 strikeouts over six August starts. He finished the month second in ERA, tied for second in wins, tied for third in innings pitched (43.2), and also led the majors with a 2.21 ERA on the season. This is the first career monthly award for Buchholz.
  - St. Louis Cardinals first baseman Albert Pujols and Atlanta Braves starter Tim Hudson are voted the National League Player and Pitcher of the Month, respectively, for August. In 26 games last month, Pujols batted .379 (39-for-103) and led the circuit with 11 home runs, a .777 slugging and 29 runs scored while driving in 23 runs. On August 26, Pujols clubbed his 400th career home run, his 34th of the season, becoming the first player to reach the 400-homer plateau in his first 10 Major League seasons. This is the fifth career monthly award for Pujols, the most recent being earned in June 2009. Hudson went 4–0 with a 1.71 earned run average in six starts and struck out 35 while walking only nine in 42 innings of work. On August 28, he notched his 1,500th career strikeout and his 600th for Atlanta in a 12–3 victory over the Florida Marlins. This is the second career monthly award for Hudson and his first since winning American League honors in September 2000 with the Oakland Athletics.
- September 4 – At Target Field, Jim Thome of the Minnesota Twins hits two home runs in the Twins' 12–4 victory over the Texas Rangers. The home runs give Thome 584 on his career, moving him past Mark McGwire for ninth place on the all-time list.
- September 6 – At Yankee Stadium, Alex Rodriguez sets a Major League record by registering 100 runs batted in for the 14th time in his career. After homering in the fourth inning of the New York Yankees' 4–3 loss to the Baltimore Orioles, Rodriguez records his 100th RBI in the sixth inning, on a sacrifice fly that scores Nick Swisher. Rodriguez breaks a four-way tie that he had shared with Babe Ruth, Lou Gehrig and Jimmie Foxx with 13 seasons of at least 100 RBIs.
- September 8 – In the Milwaukee Brewers' 4–2 victory over the St. Louis Cardinals at Miller Park, Trevor Hoffman records his 600th save.
- September 11 – At Progressive Field, Jim Thome of the Minnesota Twins hits a 12th-inning home run for the lone run of the game in the Twins' 1–0 victory over his former team, the Cleveland Indians. The home run gives Thome 587 on his career, passing Frank Robinson for eighth place on the all-time home run list.

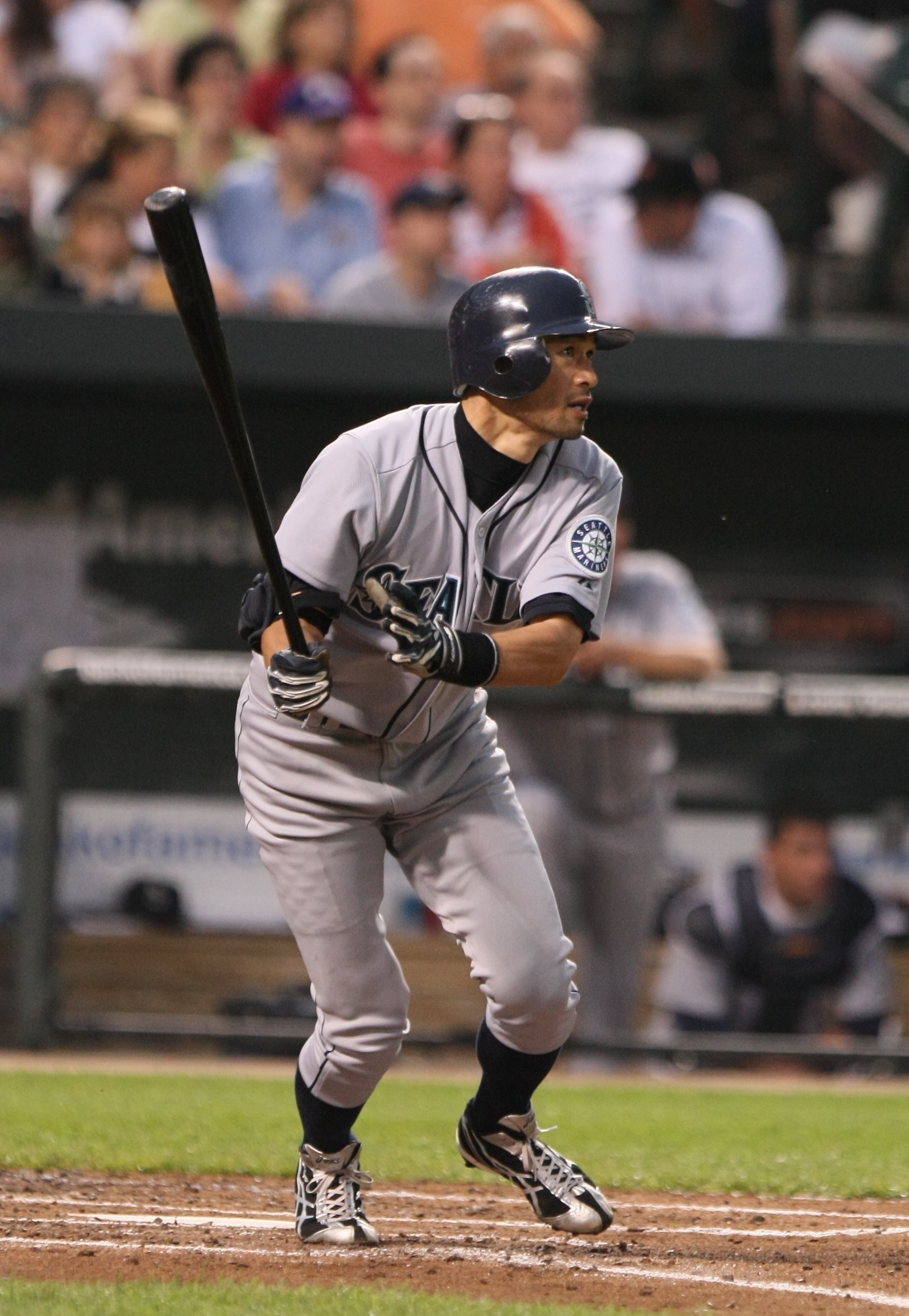
Ichiro is the first player to record 200 hits in 10 consecutive seasons

- September 19
  - Colorado Rockies shortstop Troy Tulowitzki hits two home runs in a 12–2 victory against the host Los Angeles Dodgers to tie a major league record with 14 homers in a 15-game stretch. He joins Albert Belle (1995) and Barry Bonds (2001) as the only major league players since 1900 to homer 14 times in a span of 15 games.
  - Los Angeles Angels outfielder Bobby Abreu hits two solo home runs in the Angels' 6–3 victory over the Tampa Bay Rays. Abreu now has collected nine seasons with at least 20 homers, 20 stolen bases and 30 doubles, for the third most in major league history. He is surpassed only by Barry Bonds and Bobby Bonds, who accomplished the feat 10 times.
- September 23 – At Rogers Centre, Ichiro Suzuki of the Seattle Mariners becomes the first player to record 200 hits in 10 consecutive seasons. His 200th hit, a double, comes off Toronto Blue Jays starter Shawn Hill in the third inning. Suzuki also breaks an American League record he had shared with Ty Cobb of nine seasons with 200 hits, and ties Pete Rose's record of ten 200-hit seasons. However, the Blue Jays defeat the Mariners 1–0 as José Bautista, who had already broken George Bell's single-season franchise record of 47 home runs in 1987, hits number 50 in the first inning off Félix Hernández for the game's only run.
- September 24 – Cincinnati Reds left-hander Aroldis Chapman throws the fastest pitch ever recorded in a major league game at 105 M.P.H. to the San Diego Padres' Tony Gwynn Jr.
- September 25 – Texas Rangers' rookie closer Neftalí Feliz acquires his 38th save of the season against the Oakland Athletics, setting a record for most saves by a rookie in a single season. He surpasses the previous record of 37 held by former Seattle Mariners' closer Kazuhiro Sasaki in 2000. Feliz's total for the year is at 40 saves. The win by the Texas Rangers also clinched their first AL West division title since 1999.
- September 28
  - Lotte Giants slugger Lee Dae-Ho wins the third Triple Crown in the 29 years of the Korea Baseball Organization, after hitting a .364 average with 44 home runs and 133 runs batted in. Lee also becomes the first multiple Triple Crown winner, having turned the feat in 2006.
  - The University of California announces that, due to budget cuts, it will eliminate its baseball program after the 2011 season, its 120th.
  - Cincinnati Reds outfielder Jay Bruce hits a walk-off home run off Houston Astros pitcher Tim Byrdak to clinch the team's first National League Central division title since 1995.
- September 30 – MLB players and owners agree to free agency changes. Under the deal announced on this date, players no longer have to file for free agency but automatically are set free. The exclusive period for teams to negotiate with their free agent-eligible players is cut from 15 days to five. The deadline is moved up for clubs to offer salary arbitration to their former players who became free agents, as is the deadline for teams to offer contracts for the following season to players on their 40-man rosters. In addition, teams, players and agents will be restricted in their ability to conduct free-agent negotiations in the media.

=== October ===
- October 3 – On the final day of the regular season, the San Francisco Giants and Atlanta Braves clinch playoff berths. The Giants defeat the San Diego Padres 3–0 to win the NL West, simultaneously clinching the wild-card berth for the Braves, who had beaten the Philadelphia Phillies earlier in the day.
- October 4
  - New York Yankees third baseman Alex Rodriguez and Colorado Rockies shortstop Troy Tulowitzki are selected American League and National League Players of the Month, respectively, for September. Rodriguez provided a bright spot for the Yankees down the final stretch run, leading the American League in RBIs (26) and slugging percentage (.667), while tying for second with nine home runs. He also reached safely in 18 of 22 games for his team, propelling the Yankees to their 15th postseason berth in the last 16 years. Tulowitzki provided plenty of support for Colorado, leading the Majors with 15 home runs, 40 RBIs, 30 runs scored and an .800 slugging percentage. Tulowitzki finished the season ranked first among Major League shortstops in home runs (27), RBIs (95), batting average (.315), slugging percentage (.568) and OPS (.949), to become the first player to lead all National League shortstops in both slugging percentage and fielding percentage (.984) since Jay Bell accomplished the feat in 1993 with the Pittsburgh Pirates.
  - David Price of the Tampa Bay Rays and Derek Lowe of the Atlanta Braves are voted the American League and National League Pitchers of the Month, respectively, for September. Price was instrumental in the Rays winning their second AL East Championship in club history, as he posted a 4–0 record with 33 strikeouts and a 1.67 ERA over six starts. Lowe was equally impressive for the Braves, who secured the NL Wild Card for their first trip to the playoffs since 2005, collecting a perfect 5–0 in five September starts, with a 1.17 ERA and a strikeout-to-walk ratio of 29:3. Lowe also pitched on three days' rest, winning a critical game against the Florida Marlins on September 29, and finished the regular season with a 16–12 record and a 4.00 ERA, with 136 strikeouts in 193 2/3 innings of work.
  - The New York Mets announce that both manager Jerry Manuel and general manager Omar Minaya would not return for the 2011 season.
- October 5 – In Japanese baseball, former major leaguer Matt Murton breaks Ichiro Suzuki's record for the most hits in a single season. Murton gets his 211th hit of the year with a two-run single to center in the second inning for the Hanshin Tigers against the Yakult Swallows. Suzuki set the record of 210 in 1994 for the Orix BlueWave.
- October 6 – In Game One of the NLDS at Citizens Bank Park, Roy Halladay of the Philadelphia Phillies no-hits the Cincinnati Reds 4–0. A fifth-inning walk to Jay Bruce is the only base runner against Halladay, who had already pitched a perfect game on May 29. The no-hitter is the second in postseason play, joining Don Larsen's perfect game in the 1956 World Series. Halladay also becomes the first pitcher to throw two no-hitters in one season since Nolan Ryan in 1973.
- October 9 – The New York Yankees defeat the Minnesota Twins 6–1, sweeping the ALDS in three games.
- October 10 – The Philadelphia Phillies defeat the Cincinnati Reds 2–0, completing a three-game sweep of the NLDS.
- October 11 – The San Francisco Giants defeat the Atlanta Braves 3–2 to win the NLDS 3 games to 1. All four games in the series are decided by one run.
- October 12 – The Texas Rangers defeat the Tampa Bay Rays 5–1 in Game 5 of the ALDS to win a postseason series for the first time. Each game in the series is won by the road team.
- October 22 – The Texas Rangers defeat the New York Yankees 6–1 to win the ALCS four games to two.
- October 23 – The San Francisco Giants defeat the Philadelphia Phillies 3–2 to win the NLCS four games to two.
- October 28 – The San Francisco Giants defeat the Texas Rangers 9–0 in Game 2 of the World Series. Texas reliever Derek Holland issues three consecutive walks in the eighth inning on only 13 pitches, including 11 balls in a row. The three consecutive walks tie a World Series record.
- October 29 – The New York Mets name Sandy Alderson their new general manager.
- October 31 – In Game 4 of the World Series, Madison Bumgarner and Buster Posey of the San Francisco Giants become the first all-rookie battery in a World Series game since 1947. Bumgarner combines with Brian Wilson to three-hit the Texas Rangers in a 4–0 San Francisco victory. Combined with a 9–0 loss to the Giants in Game 2, the Rangers become the first team to be shut out twice in a World Series since 1966. It is also the Giants pitching staff's fourth shutout of the postseason, tying a Major League record.

=== November ===
- November 1 – The San Francisco Giants defeat the Texas Rangers 3–1 to win the World Series four games to one. It is the franchise's first championship since 1954, and first since moving to San Francisco prior to the 1958 season. Tim Lincecum and Brian Wilson combine to three-hit the Rangers. Édgar Rentería, whose seventh-inning three-run home run against Cliff Lee broke a scoreless tie and accounted for all the Giants' runs in the game, is named series MVP.
- November 7 – The Chiba Lotte Marines defeat the Chunichi Dragons 8–7 to win the Japan Series four games to two, with one tie. It is the franchise's first championship since 2005 and fourth overall. The Marines' Toshiaki Imae is named series MVP.
- November 10 – The Kansas City Royals send David DeJesus to the Oakland Athletics for Justin Marks and Vin Mazzaro.
- November 13 – The Florida Marlins trade Cameron Maybin to the San Diego Padres for Edward Mujica and Ryan Webb.
- November 16 – The Florida Marlins trade Dan Uggla to the Atlanta Braves for Michael Dunn and Omar Infante.
- November 21 – Kansas City Royals pitcher Anthony Lerew hurls a no-hitter in the Venezuelan Winter League as the Navegantes de Magallanes blank the Leones del Caracas, 6–0. Lerew walks four and strikes out four, improving to 3–0 and a 1.11 ERA in six appearances. This is only the 16th no-hitter in the 66 years of history of the league.
- November 23 – The New York Mets name Terry Collins their new manager.
- November 25 – Free agent Kaz Matsui returns to Japan, signing with the Rakuten Eagles of the Japanese Pacific League.

=== December ===
- December 1 – Dan Shulman, Orel Hershiser and Bobby Valentine will be in the booth for ESPN's Sunday Night Baseball next season, the network announces.
- December 5 – Outfielder Jayson Werth signs as a Free Agent with the Washington Nationals for seven years and $122 million.
- December 6
  - In the first vote of a newly revamped Veterans Committee, longtime general manager Pat Gillick is the only individual elected to the National Baseball Hall of Fame. He will be formally inducted on July 24, 2011.
  - The San Diego Padres trade Adrian Gonzalez to the Boston Red Sox for Reymond Fuentes, Casey Kelly, Anthony Rizzo and a player to be named later. The Red Sox send Eric Patterson to the Padres to complete the trade on December 16.
  - The Arizona Diamondbacks send Mark Reynolds and a player to be named or cash to the Baltimore Orioles for David Hernandez and Kameron Mickolio.
- December 7
  - A lawsuit is filed against Fred Wilpon, Jeff Wilpon, Saul Katz and various entities affiliated with the New York Mets and Sterling Equities Associates to recover money for the victims of the Bernie Madoff Ponzi scheme. The civil suit, brought by court-appointed trustee Irving Picard, alleges that the partners in Sterling knew or should have known that Madoff's investment operation was a fraud.
  - The Baseball Writers' Association of America announces Bill Conlin as the 2011 recipient of the J. G. Taylor Spink Award for meritorious contributions to baseball writing. He will receive the award on July 23, 2011, as part of the Hall of Fame induction festivities.
- December 8 – The National Baseball Hall of Fame announces Dave Van Horne as the 2011 recipient of the Ford C. Frick Award for excellence in baseball broadcasting. He will receive the award alongside Conlin on July 23, 2011.
- December 11 – Outfielder Carl Crawford signs as a Free Agent with the Boston Red Sox for seven-years and $142 million.
- December 15 – Pitcher Cliff Lee returns to the Philadelphia Phillies, signing a five-year, $120 million contract with a vesting option for a sixth season in 2016, which would increase the value of the deal to $135 million.
- December 16 – The New York Yankees sign free agent catcher Russell Martin.
- December 17
  - Derek Jeter and the New York Yankees agree on a new three-year, $51 million contract that includes a player option for the 2014 season.
  - The Tampa Bay Rays trade Jason Bartlett and a player to be named to the San Diego Padres for Cole Figueroa, Brandon Gomes, Cesar Ramos and Adam Russell.
- December 19 – The Kansas City Royals trade pitcher Zack Greinke and shortstop Yuniesky Betancourt to the Milwaukee Brewers for Lorenzo Cain, Alcides Escobar, Jeremy Jeffress and Jake Odorizzi. The Royals had a deal in place that would have sent Greinke to the Washington Nationals for infielder Danny Espinosa, reliever Drew Storen and pitcher Jordan Zimmermann, however, Greinke invoked his no-trade clause to reject the deal.
- December 20 – Florida International University baseball star Garrett Wittels and four friends are arrested in the Bahamas and charged with raping two seventeen-year-old girls at the Atlantis Resort & Casino on Paradise Island. Wittels and two friends were released on $10,000 bond apiece after a court hearing on the 23rd.
- December 21
  - All-Star closer Bobby Jenks joins the Boston Red Sox, signing a two-year, $12 million deal to be the setup man for Jonathan Papelbon.
  - Pitcher Rich Harden rejoins the Oakland Athletics, signing a one-year, $1.5 million contract.
- December 23 – The Houston Astros send relief pitcher Matt Lindstrom to the Colorado Rockies for pitchers Jonnathan Aristil and Wes Musick.
- December 30 – Hall of Famer Harmon Killebrew reveals in a statement that he has recently been diagnosed with esophageal cancer, and is being treated by a team of medical professionals at the Mayo Clinic.

== Deaths ==
=== January ===
- January 3 – Bobby Wilkins, 87, shortstop for the 1944 and 1945 Philadelphia Athletics.
- January 4 – Rory Markas, 54, play-by-play announcer for the Los Angeles Angels of Anaheim and the Milwaukee Brewers.
- January 12 – Hillis Layne, 91, third baseman for the Washington Senators in the 1940s, who also led the Pacific Coast League hitters in 1947 with a .367 average.
- January 21
  - Bobby Bragan, 92, shortstop, catcher, manager and coach who spent 73 years in pro baseball; played in 597 games for Philadelphia Phillies (1940–1942) and Brooklyn Dodgers (1943–1944 and 1947–1948); manager of Pittsburgh Pirates (1956–1957), Cleveland Indians (1958) and Milwaukee/Atlanta Braves (1963–1966); successful minor league skipper who served as president of Texas League and of Minor League Baseball between 1969 and 1979; then spent three decades as a goodwill ambassador for Texas Rangers' organization.
  - Hal Manders, 92, pitcher who worked in 30 career games for the Detroit Tigers and Chicago Cubs between 1941 and 1946.
  - Curt Motton, 69, outfielder with the Baltimore Orioles when they won three consecutive American League pennants and a World Series from 1969 to 1971.
- January 26 – Ken Walters, 76, backup outfielder for the Philadelphia Phillies and Cincinnati Reds in the early 1960s.
- January 27 – Sammy Drake, 75, Negro leagues infielder and a member of the original 1962 New York Mets.
- January 28 – Frank Baker, 66, outfielder for the Cleveland Indians and a Vietnam War veteran.
- January 29 – Lenna Arnold, 89, pitcher for the Fort Wayne Daisies of the All-American Girls Professional Baseball League.

=== February ===
- February 7 – Paul LaPalme, 86, left-handed knuckleball pitcher for the Pirates, Cardinals, Redlegs and White Sox from 1951 to 1957.
- February 12 – Jerry Fahr, 85, pitcher for the 1951 Cleveland Indians.
- February 16
  - Jim Bibby, 65, Major League pitcher from 1972 to 1984; won World Series with Pirates in 1979 and pitched first no-hitter in Senators/Rangers history (1973).
  - Jim Waugh, 76, pitcher who posted a 5–11 record with a 6.43 ERA for the Pittsburgh Pirates from 1952 to 1953.
- February 17 – Lottie Beck, 81, All-American Girls Professional Baseball League catcher.
- February 18
  - Bob Chakales, 82, pitcher for the Indians, Orioles, White Sox, Senators and Red Sox.
  - John Kibler, 82, National League umpire for 27 years (1963–1989); worked in 3,630 league games, five league championship series, four All-Star games, and four World Series.
- February 19 – George Cisar, 99, outfielder for the 1937 Brooklyn Dodgers; the second-oldest former major-league player at the time of his death.
- February 21 – George Strickland, 84, shortstop for ten seasons between 1950 and 1960 with the Pittsburgh Pirates and Cleveland Indians; and a coach, interim manager (of 1964 and 1966 Indians) and scout for 11 more.

=== March ===
- March 3
  - Frank Bertaina, 65, pitcher for the Senators, Orioles and Cardinals between 1964 and 1970.
  - Hank Small, 58, first baseman who played for the 1978 Atlanta Braves.
- March 6 – Jim Roland, 67, left-handed pitcher who played from 1962 through 1972 for the Athletics, Twins, Yankees and Rangers.
- March 9
  - Willie Davis, 69, three-time Gold Glove outfielder for the Dodgers, Expos, Rangers, Cardinals, Padres and Angels, member of the Dodgers' 1963 and 1965 World Series champions.
  - Elizabeth Farrow, 83, All-American Girls Professional Baseball League player.
- March 15 – Ken Holcombe, 91, pitcher who posted an 18–22 record in six seasons with the Yankees, Reds, White Sox, Browns and Red Sox.
- March 16 – Billy Hoeft, 77, All-Star pitcher whose career spanned 15 seasons, mainly with the Detroit Tigers.
- March 17 – Van Fletcher, 85, pitcher for the 1955 Detroit Tigers.
- March 23
  - Edith Barney, 87, catcher for the Grand Rapids Chicks of the All-American Girls Professional Baseball League.
  - Jim Colzie, 89, Negro league baseball pitcher.
- March 28
  - Joe Gates, 55, former Chicago White Sox player and Gary SouthShore RailCats bench coach.
  - John Purdin, 67, relief pitcher who played for the Los Angeles Dodgers between the 1964 and 1969 seasons.

=== April ===
- April 2 – Mike Cuellar, 72, 4-time All-Star pitcher for the Cincinnati Redlegs, St. Louis Cardinals, Houston Astros, Baltimore Orioles, and California Angels between 1959 and 1977; won 1969 AL Cy Young Award and 1970 World Series; and was one of four 20-game winners on the 1971 Baltimore Orioles.
- April 3 – Jim Pagliaroni, 72, catcher for the Boston Red Sox, Pittsburgh Pirates, Oakland Athletics and Seattle Pilots for 11 seasons between 1955 and 1969; set a Pirates' all-time, season-record for catchers with 17 home runs in 1965.
- April 6 – Bob Clear, 82, coach for the California Angels from July 1976 through 1987; longtime minor-league player, manager and instructor.
- April 7 – Hermina Franks, 95, All-American Girls Professional Baseball League player.
- April 9 – Bill Moisan, 84, relief pitcher for the 1953 Chicago Cubs, who had been a prisoner of war in Germany in early 1945, earning the Silver Star, the Bronze Star and Purple Heart.
- April 15 – Takuya Kimura, 37, Japanese player for the Nippon-Ham Fighters, Toyo Carp, and Yomiuri Giants from 1992 to 2009, and a member of the 2009 Japan Series champion.
- April 20 – Keli McGregor, 48, President of the Colorado Rockies and a former tight end in the National Football League.
- April 22
  - Pete Castiglione, 89, third baseman who hit .255 in eight seasons with the Pirates and Cardinals
  - Dick Kenworthy, 69, backup infielder who hit .215 in 125 games with the Chicago White Sox from 1962 to 1968
- April 29 – Penny O'Brian, 90, Canadian outfielder who played in the All-American Girls Professional Baseball League.

=== May ===
- May 4 – Ernie Harwell, 92, Ford C. Frick Award winning broadcaster who spent 42 of his 55-year career with the Detroit Tigers, joining Mel Allen, Jack Buck and Harry Caray among the game's most famous play-by-play voices.
- May 6 – Robin Roberts, 83, Hall of Fame pitcher and a seven-time All-Star in 14 seasons with the Philadelphia Phillies, who led the National League in wins from 1952 to 1955, innings pitched from '51 to '55 and complete games from '52 to '56.
- May 8 – George Susce, 78, middle relief pitcher who posted a 22–17 record with a 4.42 ERA and three saves in 117 games for the Red Sox and Tigers from 1955 to 1959; his father was an MLB catcher and longtime coach
- May 10 – Terry Rukavina, 78, All-American Girls Professional Baseball League infielder/outffielder for three teams in parts of three seasons spanning 1950–1953.
- May 13 – Jay Schlueter, 60, left fielder for the 1971 Houston Astros.
- May 17 – Dorothy Kamenshek, 84, seven-time All-Star first basewoman and two-time champion bat in the All-American Girls Professional Baseball League.
- May 23 – José Lima, 37, All-Star Dominican pitcher who posted an 89–102 record in 13 seasons with the Tigers, Astros, Royals, Dodgers and Mets.
- May 24
  - Morrie Martin, 87, pitcher who played for seven different teams from 1949 to 1959, mainly with the Philadelphia Athletics.
  - Rogelio Martínez, 91, Cuban pitcher for the 1950 Washington Senators.
- May 27 – Louise Arnold, 87, pitcher for the AAGPBL champion South Bend Blue Sox in 1951 and 1952, who hurled a no-hitter and led the league with a .833 winning percentage in 1951.
- May 29 – Jeriome Robertson, 33, who won 15 games as a rookie pitcher with the Houston Astros in 2003.

=== June ===
- June 1 – Freddie Burdette, 73, middle reliever who posted a 1–0 record with a 3.41 ERA and one save in 68 games for the Chicago Cubs from 1962 to 1964.
- June 6 – Jerry Stephenson, 66, pitcher who posted an 8–19 record in a seven-year career, and a member of the 1967 Impossible Dream Red Sox team; became a longtime scout, notably for the Los Angeles Dodgers; son of Joe Stephenson.
- June 14 – Oscar Azócar, 45, Venezuelan outfielder for the Yankees and Padres in the early 1990s.
- June 16 – Bob Hartman, 72, left-handed pitcher who had brief stints with the Milwaukee Braves in 1959 and the Cleveland Indians in 1962.

=== July ===
- July 1 – Andrew 'Pullman' Porter, 100, Negro leagues pitcher whose 22-year career included stints for several teams all over the country and even outside its borders, in Cuba, Mexico and Venezuela, who at the time of his death was the second oldest living Negro leagues ballplayer after Emilio 'Millito' Navarro.
- July 8
  - Clint Hartung, 87, pitcher and outfielder for the New York Giants from 1947 to 1952, who became the 11th player in major league history whose first home run came as a pitcher and later homered as a position player.
  - Maje McDonnell, 89, Philadelphia Phillies coach from 1951 to 1957, and a World War II veteran who earned five battle stars and a Bronze Star.
- July 9 – Frank Verdi, 84, shortstop who played briefly for the Yankees in the 1953 season and later managed in the minor leagues.
- July 10
  - Ed Palmquist, 77, relief pitcher who played from 1960 to 1961 with the Dodgers and Twins.
  - Johnny Van Cuyk, 89, relief pitcher who played on the 1949 Brooklyn Dodgers team that won the National League pennant.
  - Janet Wiley, 76, All-American Girls Professional Baseball League infielder for the 1951 South Bend Blue Sox champion team.
- July 11 – Bob Sheppard, 99, public address announcer at Yankee Stadium from 1951 to 2007.
- July 13 – George Steinbrenner, 80, New York Yankees owner since 1973; known as "The Boss" for his imperious manner, he revived fortunes of the Yankees' franchise, which won 11 AL pennants and seven World Series (1977, 1978, 1996, 1998, 1999, 2000, 2009) during his 37 years as owner.
- July 15 – Billy Loes, 80, pitcher who posted an 80–63 record in 12 seasons with the Brooklyn Dodgers, Baltimore Orioles and San Francisco Giants.
- July 16 – Kenny Kuhn, 73, backup infielder who hit .210 in 71 games with the Cleveland Indians from 1955 to 1957.
- July 20 – Jimmy McMath, 60, backup outfielder for the 1968 Chicago Cubs.
- July 21 – Ralph Houk, 90, third-string catcher for the New York Yankees who went on to win three straight American League pennants and two World Series championships in his first three seasons (1961–1963) as their manager; general manager of the Yankees from 1964 to May 1966, then returned to managing with Bombers (through 1973), Detroit Tigers (1974–1978) and Boston Red Sox (1981–1984).
- July 22 – Larry Fritz, 61, pinch-hitter for the 1975 Philadelphia Phillies.
- July 26 – Jake Jacobs, 73, outfielder who played from 1960 to 1961 for the Washington Senators and Minnesota Twins.

=== August ===
- August 7 – Keith Drumright, 55, second baseman for the 1978 Astros and the 1981 Athletics.
- August 9 – Gene Hermanski, 90, outfielder for the Brooklyn Dodgers, Chicago Cubs and Pittsburgh Pirates from 1943 to 1953, who also was a World War II veteran.
- August 11 – Nellie King, 82, pitcher for the Pittsburgh Pirates in the 1950s and broadcaster of the last Pirates game at Three Rivers Stadium in 2000.
- August 15 – Joe L. Brown, 91, Pirates' general manager (1956–1976 and 1985) who helped build the 1960 world champions that defeated the slugging New York Yankees and the 1971 and 1979 teams that beat the Orioles twice in the World Series; son of Joe E. Brown.
- August 16 – Bobby Thomson, 86, whose Shot Heard 'Round the World in 1951 has echoed through baseball history as perhaps the game's most famous home run.
- August 21 – Satch Davidson, 74, National League umpire who worked behind the plate when Hank Aaron hit his historic 715th career home run as well as when Carlton Fisk hit his memorable homer in Game 6 of the 1975 World Series.
- August 26 – Cal McLish, 84, All-Star pitcher with a 15-season career for five teams, who set a major league record with 16 consecutive road wins over the 1958 and 1959 seasons, which stood for 36 years until Greg Maddux surpassed it over the 1994 and 1995 seasons; later a longtime pitching coach.

=== September ===
- September 1 – Don Lang, 95, infielder for the Cincinnati Reds and St. Louis Cardinals.
- September 9 – Eddie Phillips, 80, pinch-runner who scored four runs in nine games for the 1953 St. Louis Cardinals, but never batted or fielded a ball in the majors.
- September 15 – Al LaMacchia, 89, relief pitcher for the St. Louis Browns and Washington Senators from 1943 to 1946, who also is credited with having scouted players such as George Bell, Cito Gaston, Dale Murphy, Dave Stieb and David Wells.
- September 16 – Wayne Twitchell, 62, 1973 NL All-Star pitcher who posted a 48–65 record in ten seasons with the Brewers, Phillies, Expos, Mets and Mariners.
- September 18 – Ray Coleman, 88, outfielder and World War II veteran, who hit a .258 average in five seasons for the St. Louis Browns, Philadelphia Athletics and Chicago White Sox.
- September 20
  - Jack Cassini, 90, minor league infielder who six times led his league in stolen bases between 1940 and 1953; appeared in eight games as a pinch runner for 1949 Pittsburgh Pirates, scoring three runs.
  - Al Pilarcik, 80, outfielder and Korean War veteran, who hit .256 in 668 games for the Kansas City Athletics, Baltimore Orioles and Chicago White Sox.
- September 23 – Bob Shaw, 77, who spent eleven years in the majors pitching for the Tigers, White Sox, Kansas City Athletics, Milwaukee Braves, SF Giants, Mets and Cubs, and beat Sandy Koufax in 1959 World Series.

=== October ===
- October 3
  - Maury Allen, 88, sportswriter and former columnist for the New York Post.
  - Ben Mondor, 85, long time owner of Triple-A Pawtucket Red Sox.
- October 8 – Dale Roberts, 70, relief pitcher for the 1967 New York Yankees.
- October 16 – Valmy Thomas, 81, first Puerto Rican catcher to play in the majors.
- October 17
  - Joe Lis, 64, first baseman who played from 1970 through 1977 for the Phillies, Twins, Indians and Mariners.
  - Freddy Schuman (Freddy Sez), 85, Yankee Stadium staple for the last 20 years.
- October 20
  - Otey Clark, 95, pitcher who played briefly for the 1945 Boston Red Sox.
  - Bill Jennings, 85, shortstop for the 1951 St. Louis Browns.
  - Tony Roig, 82, utility infielder for the Washington Senators from 1953 to 1956.
- October 25 – Rudy Rufer, 84, shortstop for the New York Giants from 1949 to 1951, who later scouted for the Los Angeles Dodgers during 25 years.
- October 27 – Gene Fodge, 79, pitcher for the 1958 Chicago Cubs.
- October 31 – Artie Wilson, 90, Negro leagues All-Star shortstop.

=== November ===
- November 2 – Clyde King, 86, whose major league baseball career as a player, coach, manager and front-office man spanned six decades.
- November 4 – Sparky Anderson, 76, Hall of Fame manager; first manager to win the World Series in both leagues with the Cincinnati Reds (1975–1976) and Detroit Tigers (1984); in his playing days, a second baseman who played one MLB season for the 1959 Philadelphia Phillies.
- November 6 – Jay Van Noy, 82, a four-sport standout at Utah State, who later played for the 1951 Cardinals.
- November 7 – George Estock, 86, pitcher for the 1951 Boston Braves.
- November 10 – Dave Niehaus, 75, Hall of Fame broadcaster for the Seattle Mariners since their inception in 1977 to their final game of the 2010 season.
- November 13 – George Binks, 96, outfielder/first baseman who hit .253 in 351 games for the Washington Senators, Philadelphia Athletics and St. Louis Browns from 1944 to 1948. Hit .300 for the 1938 Tyler Trojans of the East Texas League.
- November 14 – Hal Bamberger, 86, outfielder for the 1948 New York Giants.
- November 15 – Ed Kirkpatrick, 66, outfielder with a 16-year major league career, seven of them for the Los Angeles Angels.
- November 20 – Danny McDevitt, 78, pitcher who posted a 21–27 record and a 4.40 ERA in six seasons, who is most remembered for starting the Dodgers' last home game in Brooklyn, hurling a 2–0 shutout victory over the Pirates.
- November 21 – Steve Kuczek, 85, pinch-hitter for the 1949 Boston Braves.
- November 22
  - Jean Cione, 82, pitcher who hurled three no-hitters and turned an unassisted triple play in the All American Girls Professional Baseball League.
  - Tom Underwood, 56, pitcher who posted an 86–87 record with a 3.89 ERA for the Phillies, Cardinals, Blue Jays, Yankees, Athletics and Orioles from 1974 to 1984.
- November 24 – A. Arthur Giddon, 101, lawyer and World War II veteran, who served as a 13-year-old batboy for the 1922 Boston Braves.
- November 27 – Bill Werle, 89, who pitched for the Pirates, Red Sox and Cardinals from 1949 to 1954.
- November 28
  - Cal Emery, 73, first baseman for the 1963 Phillies, who also played in Japan, managed in the minors, and was a major league coach.
  - Gil McDougald, 82, All-Star infielder who helped the New York Yankees win five World Series championships during the 1950s.
- November 30 – R. C. Stevens, 76, first baseman who batted .210 with eight home runs in 104 games for the Pirates and Senators from 1958 to 1961.

=== December ===
- December 2 – Ron Santo, 70, nine-time National League All-Star third baseman and one of the greatest players in Chicago Cubs history (1960–1973), then a beloved broadcaster for the team; selected posthumously to Baseball Hall of Fame in 2012.
- December 4 – Ken Lehman, 82, left-handed specialist who posted a 14–10 record and a 3.91 ERA in 134 games for the Brooklyn Dodgers, Baltimore Orioles and Philadelphia Phillies in five seasons spanning 1952 to 1961.
- December 7 – Art Mahan, 97, first baseman for the 1940 Phillies.
- December 15 – Bob Feller, 92, Cleveland Indians Hall of Fame pitcher who threw the only Opening Day no-hitter in MLB history in 1940.
- December 17 – Walt Dropo, 87, who played 13 seasons in the majors and won the 1950 American League Rookie of the Year award with the Boston Red Sox, after batting .322 with 34 home runs and a league-best 144 RBI in 136 games.
- December 18
  - Phil Cavarretta, 94, three-time All-Star first baseman for Chicago Cubs (1934–1953) who won the National League MVP in 1945 to lead the team to the World Series; as player-manager, compiled a 169–213 (.442) record from July 22, 1951 through end of 1953 campaign.
  - Ann Cindric, 88, All-American Girls Professional Baseball League pitcher.
- December 25 – Karl Olson, 80, outfielder who hit .235 with six home runs and 50 RBI in 279 games for the Red Sox, Senators and Tigers from 1951 to 1957.
- December 28 – Bill Lajoie, 76, former scouting director who became general manager of Detroit Tigers (1984–1990), playing an integral role in building 1984 World Series championship team and 1987 division champions.
- December 29 – Steve Boros, 74, third baseman, coach and manager who spent more than four decades in baseball; appeared in 422 games between 1957 and 1965 for Tigers, Cubs and Reds; managed Athletics (1983–1984) and Padres (1986).
- December 30 – Tom Vandergriff, 84, former mayor of Arlington, Texas, who helped lure the Texas Rangers to the Dallas/Fort Worth area in 1972.
