= 1976 Southern League season =

- League: Southern League
- Sport: Baseball
- Duration: April 13 – September 2
- Games: 140
- Teams: 8

Regular season
- League champions: Montgomery Rebels
- Season MVP: Larry Foster, Knoxville Sox

Playoffs
- League champions: Montgomery Rebels
- Runners-up: Orlando Twins

SL seasons
- ← 1975 1977 →

The 1976 Southern League was a Class AA baseball season played between April 13 and September 2. Eight teams played a 140-game schedule, with the top team in each division in each half of the season qualifying for the post-season.

The Montgomery Rebels won the Southern League championship, as they defeated the Orlando Twins in the playoffs.

== Team changes ==
- The Asheville Orioles relocated to Charlotte, North Carolina and were renamed the Charlotte Orioles. The team moved from the West Division to the East Division. The club remained affiliated with the Baltimore Orioles.
- The Birmingham Athletics relocated to Chattanooga, Tennessee and were renamed the Chattanooga Lookouts. The club remained affiliated with the Oakland Athletics.
- The Columbus Astros moved from the East Division to the West Division.

== Teams ==
1976 Southern League
Division	Team	City	MLB Affiliate	Stadium
East	Charlotte Orioles	Charlotte, North Carolina	Baltimore Orioles	Clark Griffith Park
East	Jacksonville Suns	Jacksonville, Florida	Kansas City Royals	Wolfson Park
East	Orlando Twins	Orlando, Florida	Minnesota Twins	Tinker Field
East	Savannah Braves	Savannah, Georgia	Atlanta Braves	Grayson Stadium
West	Chattanooga Lookouts	Chattanooga, Tennessee	Oakland Athletics	Engel Stadium
West	Columbus Astros	Columbus, Georgia	Houston Astros	Golden Park
West	Knoxville Sox	Knoxville, Tennessee	Chicago White Sox	Bill Meyer Stadium
West	Montgomery Rebels	Montgomery, Alabama	Detroit Tigers	Paterson Field

== Map of teams ==
East Division West Division

== Regular season ==
=== Summary ===
- The Montgomery Rebels finished the season with the best record in the league for the first time since 1973.

=== Standings ===
East Division
Team	Win	Loss	%	GB
Orlando Twins	75	64	.540	–
Charlotte Orioles	74	66	.529	1.5
Savannah Braves	69	71	.493	6.5
Jacksonville Suns	66	72	.478	8.5
West Division
Montgomery Rebels	81	56	.591	–
Chattanooga Lookouts	70	68	.507	11.5
Knoxville Sox	61	77	.442	20.5
Columbus Astros	58	80	.420	23.5

== League Leaders ==
=== Batting leaders ===
Stat	Player	Total
AVG	Tim Corcoran, Montgomery Rebels	.309
H	Blake Doyle, Charlotte Orioles	158
R	Jim Obradovich, Orlando Twins	84
2B	Donn Seidholz, Knoxville Sox	28
3B	Derek Bryant, Chattanooga Lookouts; Rafael Liranzo, Charlotte Orioles	10
HR	Jim Obradovich, Orlando Twins	21
RBI	Jim Obradovich, Orlando Twins	68
SB	Derek Bryant, Chattanooga Lookouts; Roger Cador, Savannah Braves	42

=== Pitching leaders ===
Stat	Player	Total
W	Dave Ford, Charlotte Orioles	17
ERA	Dave Rozema, Montgomery Rebels	1.57
CG	Dave Ford, Charlotte Orioles	19
SHO	Dave Ford, Charlotte Orioles; Greg Thayer, Orlando Twins; Davis May, Orlando Twins; Dave Rozema, Montgomery Rebels	4
SV	Randy Miller, Charlotte Orioles	19
IP	Dave Ford, Charlotte Orioles	212.0
SO	Dave Ford, Charlotte Orioles	121

== Playoffs ==
- The playoffs are expanded to include a one-game playoff for each divisional winner in each half of the season.
- The Montgomery Rebels won their second consecutive, and fourth overall Southern League championship, defeating the Orlando Twins in four games.

=== Playoff bracket ===
Division finals
E1	Orlando	1
E2	Charlotte	0
W1	Montgomery	1
W2	Chattanooga	0

Finals
E1	Orlando	1
W1	Montgomery	3

== Awards ==
Southern League awards
Award name	Recipient
Most Valuable Player	Larry Foster, Knoxville Sox
Pitcher of the Year	Dave Ford, Charlotte Orioles
Manager of the Year	Rene Lachemann, Chattanooga Lookouts

== See also ==
- 1976 Major League Baseball season
