= 1978 Southern League season =

- League: Southern League
- Sport: Baseball
- Duration: April 13 – September 3
- Number of games: 144
- Number of teams: 10

Regular season
- League champions: Knoxville Sox
- Season MVP: Eddie Gates, Memphis Chicks

Playoffs
- League champions: Knoxville Sox
- Runners-up: Savannah Braves

SL seasons
- ← 1977 1979 →

The 1978 Southern League was a Class AA baseball season played between April 13 and September 3. Ten teams played a 144-game schedule, with the top team in each division in each half of the season qualifying for the post-season.

The Knoxville Sox won the Southern League championship, as they defeated the Savannah Braves in the playoffs.

== Team changes ==
- The Memphis Chicks join the league as an expansion team and play in the West Division. The team began an affiliation with the Montreal Expos.
- The Nashville Sounds join the league as an expansion team and play in the West Division. The team began an affiliation with the Cincinnati Reds.
- The Columbus Astros move from the West Division to the East Division.
- The Chattanooga Lookouts ended their affiliation with the Oakland Athletics and began a new affiliation with the Cleveland Indians.

== Teams ==
1978 Southern League
Division	Team	City	MLB Affiliate	Stadium
East	Charlotte Orioles	Charlotte, North Carolina	Baltimore Orioles	Jim Crockett Memorial Park
East	Columbus Astros	Columbus, Georgia	Houston Astros	Golden Park
East	Jacksonville Suns	Jacksonville, Florida	Kansas City Royals	Wolfson Park
East	Orlando Twins	Orlando, Florida	Minnesota Twins	Tinker Field
East	Savannah Braves	Savannah, Georgia	Atlanta Braves	Grayson Stadium
West	Chattanooga Lookouts	Chattanooga, Tennessee	Cleveland Indians	Engel Stadium
West	Knoxville Sox	Knoxville, Tennessee	Chicago White Sox	Bill Meyer Stadium
West	Memphis Chicks	Memphis, Tennessee	Montreal Expos	Tim McCarver Stadium
West	Montgomery Rebels	Montgomery, Alabama	Detroit Tigers	Paterson Field
West	Nashville Sounds	Nashville, Tennessee	Cincinnati Reds	Herschel Greer Stadium

== Map of teams ==
East Division West Division

== Regular season ==
=== Summary ===
- The Knoxville Sox finished the season with the best record in the league for the first time in franchise history.

=== Standings ===
East Division
Team	Win	Loss	%	GB
Orlando Twins	82	61	.573	–
Jacksonville Suns	73	69	.514	8.5
Savannah Braves	72	72	.500	10.5
Columbus Astros	70	73	.490	12
Charlotte Orioles	66	78	.458	16.5
West Division
Knoxville Sox	88	56	.611	–
Memphis Chicks	71	73	.493	17
Montgomery Rebels	67	77	.465	21
Nashville Sounds	64	77	.454	22.5
Chattanooga Lookouts	63	80	.441	24.5

== League Leaders ==
=== Batting leaders ===
Stat	Player	Total
AVG	Joe Gates, Knoxville Sox	.332
H	Joe Gates, Knoxville Sox	161
R	Joe Gates, Knoxville Sox	85
2B	Sal Rende, Chattanooga Lookouts	29
3B	Gary Cooper, Savannah Braves	9
HR	Eddie Gates, Memphis Chicks	25
RBI	Sal Rende, Chattanooga Lookouts	87
SB	LaMart Harris, Memphis Chicks	45

=== Pitching leaders ===
Stat	Player	Total
W	Terry Sheehan, Orlando Twins	17
ERA	Roger Alexander, Savannah Braves	1.84
CG	Gordie Pladson, Columbus Astros	14
SHO	Roger Alexander, Savannah Braves	5
SV	Dwight Lewis, Orlando Twins; Dan Quisenberry, Jacksonville Suns	15
IP	Terry Sheehan, Orlando Twins	213.0
SO	Jay Howell, Nashville Sounds	173

== Playoffs ==
- The Knoxville Sox earned a bye in the division finals, as they won the division in both halves of the season.
- The Knoxville Sox won their second Southern League championship, defeating the Savannah Braves in three games.

=== Playoff bracket ===
Division finals
E1	Orlando	1
E2	Savannah	2
W1	Knoxville	bye

Finals
E2	Savannah	1
W1	Knoxville	2

== Awards ==
Southern League awards
Award name	Recipient
Most Valuable Player	Eddie Gates, Memphis Chicks
Pitcher of the Year	Bruce Berenyi, Nashville Sounds
Manager of the Year	Bobby Dews, Savannah Braves

== See also ==
- 1978 Major League Baseball season
