= 1977 Southern League season =

- League: Southern League
- Sport: Baseball
- Duration: April 12 – August 31
- Number of games: 140
- Number of teams: 8

Regular season
- League champions: Montgomery Rebels
- Season MVP: Alan Trammell, Montgomery Rebels

Playoffs
- League champions: Montgomery Rebels
- Runners-up: Jacksonville Suns

SL seasons
- ← 1976 1978 →

The 1977 Southern League was a Class AA baseball season played between April 12 and August 31. Eight teams played a 140-game schedule, with the top team in each division in each half of the season qualifying for the post-season.

The Montgomery Rebels won the Southern League championship, as they defeated the Jacksonville Suns in the playoffs.

== Teams ==
1977 Southern League
Division	Team	City	MLB Affiliate	Stadium
East	Charlotte Orioles	Charlotte, North Carolina	Baltimore Orioles	Jim Crockett Memorial Park
East	Jacksonville Suns	Jacksonville, Florida	Kansas City Royals	Wolfson Park
East	Orlando Twins	Orlando, Florida	Minnesota Twins	Tinker Field
East	Savannah Braves	Savannah, Georgia	Atlanta Braves	Grayson Stadium
West	Chattanooga Lookouts	Chattanooga, Tennessee	Oakland Athletics	Engel Stadium
West	Columbus Astros	Columbus, Georgia	Houston Astros	Golden Park
West	Knoxville Sox	Knoxville, Tennessee	Chicago White Sox	Bill Meyer Stadium
West	Montgomery Rebels	Montgomery, Alabama	Detroit Tigers	Paterson Field

== Map of teams ==
East Division West Division

== Regular season ==
=== Summary ===
- The Montgomery Rebels finished the season with the best record in the league for the second consecutive season.
- Despite finishing with the highest winning percentage in the East Division, the Orlando Twins failed to qualify for the post-season, as they did not win the division in either half of the season.

=== Standings ===
East Division
Team	Win	Loss	%	GB
Orlando Twins	76	61	.555	–
Savannah Braves	77	63	.550	0.5
Jacksonville Suns	72	66	.522	4.5
Charlotte Orioles	69	71	.493	8.5
West Division
Montgomery Rebels	86	51	.628	–
Chattanooga Lookouts	61	75	.449	24.5
Columbus Astros	60	77	.438	26
Knoxville Sox	50	87	.365	36

== League Leaders ==
=== Batting leaders ===
Stat	Player	Total
AVG	Mark Corey, Charlotte Orioles	.310
H	Mark Corey, Charlotte Orioles	152
R	Lou Whitaker, Montgomery Rebels	81
2B	Terrance Lynch, Montgomery Rebels	28
3B	Alan Trammell, Montgomery Rebels	19
HR	Tom Chism, Charlotte Orioles; Al Javier, Columbus Astros; Jerry Keller, Savannah Braves	17
RBI	Jerry Keller, Savannah Braves	86
SB	Jeff Cox, Chattanooga Lookouts	68

=== Pitching leaders ===
Stat	Player	Total
W	Bryn Smith, Charlotte Orioles	15
ERA	George Throop, Jacksonville Suns	2.17
CG	Sheldon Burnside, Montgomery Rebels; Bryn Smith, Charlotte Orioles	16
SHO	Greg Field, Orlando Twins; George Throop, Jacksonville Suns; Gary Wilson, Columbus Astros	4
SV	Duane Theiss, Savannah Braves	13
IP	Bryn Smith, Charlotte Orioles	206.0
SO	Matt Keough, Chattanooga Lookouts	153

== Playoffs ==
- The Montgomery Rebels earned a bye in the division finals, as they won the division in both halves of the season.
- The division finals is increased to a best-of-three series.
- The league finals is decreased to a best-of-three series.
- The Montgomery Rebels won their third consecutive, and fifth overall Southern League championship, defeating the Jacksonville Suns in two games.

=== Playoff bracket ===
Division finals
E1	Savannah	1
E2	Jacksonville	2
W1	Montgomery	bye

Finals
E2	Jacksonville	0
W1	Montgomery	2

== Awards ==
Southern League awards
Award name	Recipient
Most Valuable Player	Alan Trammell, Montgomery Rebels
Pitcher of the Year	Greg Field, Orlando Twins
Manager of the Year	Ed Brinkman, Montgomery Rebels

== See also ==
- 1977 Major League Baseball season
