= 1979 Southern League season =

- League: Southern League
- Sport: Baseball
- Duration: April 16 – September 2
- Number of games: 144
- Number of teams: 10

Regular season
- League champions: Columbus Astros
- Season MVP: Danny Heep, Columbus Astros; Alan Knicely, Columbus Astros

Playoffs
- League champions: Nashville Sounds
- Runners-up: Columbus Astros

SL seasons
- ← 1978 1980 →

The 1979 Southern League was a Class AA baseball season played between April 16 and September 2. Ten teams played a 144-game schedule, with the top team in each division in each half of the season qualifying for the post-season.

The Nashville Sounds won the Southern League championship, as they defeated the Columbus Astros in the playoffs.

== Teams ==
1979 Southern League
Division	Team	City	MLB Affiliate	Stadium
East	Charlotte Orioles	Charlotte, North Carolina	Baltimore Orioles	Jim Crockett Memorial Park
East	Columbus Astros	Columbus, Georgia	Houston Astros	Golden Park
East	Jacksonville Suns	Jacksonville, Florida	Kansas City Royals	Wolfson Park
East	Orlando Twins	Orlando, Florida	Minnesota Twins	Tinker Field
East	Savannah Braves	Savannah, Georgia	Atlanta Braves	Grayson Stadium
West	Chattanooga Lookouts	Chattanooga, Tennessee	Cleveland Indians	Engel Stadium
West	Knoxville Sox	Knoxville, Tennessee	Chicago White Sox	Bill Meyer Stadium
West	Memphis Chicks	Memphis, Tennessee	Montreal Expos	Tim McCarver Stadium
West	Montgomery Rebels	Montgomery, Alabama	Detroit Tigers	Paterson Field
West	Nashville Sounds	Nashville, Tennessee	Cincinnati Reds	Herschel Greer Stadium

== Map of teams ==
East Division West Division

== Regular season ==
=== Summary ===
- The Columbus Astros finished the season with the best record in the league for the first time since 1970.

=== Standings ===
East Division
Team	Win	Loss	%	GB
Columbus Astros	84	59	.587	–
Charlotte Orioles	73	69	.514	10.5
Jacksonville Suns	69	72	.489	14
Orlando Twins	60	81	.426	23
Savannah Braves	60	83	.420	24
West Division
Nashville Sounds	83	61	.576	–
Memphis Chicks	82	62	.569	1
Chattanooga Lookouts	75	69	.521	8
Knoxville Sox	65	76	.461	16.5
Montgomery Rebels	62	81	.434	20.5

== League Leaders ==
=== Batting leaders ===
Stat	Player	Total
AVG	Joe Charboneau, Chattanooga Lookouts	.352
H	Danny Heep, Columbus Astros	171
R	Tim Raines, Memphis Chicks	104
2B	Tom Wiedenbauer, Columbus Astros	31
3B	Duane Walker, Nashville Sounds	15
HR	Alan Knicely, Columbus Astros	33
RBI	Dave Hostetler, Memphis Chicks	114
SB	LaMart Harris, Jacksonville Suns	68

=== Pitching leaders ===
Stat	Player	Total
W	Del Leatherwood, Columbus Astros	15
ERA	Scott Brown, Nashville Sounds	2.40
CG	Billy Smith, Columbus Astros	19
SHO	Del Leatherwood, Columbus Astros	4
SV	Geoff Combe, Nashville Sounds	27
IP	Del Leatherwood, Columbus Astros	202.0
SO	Bob Veselic, Orlando Twins	151

== Playoffs ==
- The final round of the playoffs is extended to a best-of-five series.
- The Nashville Sounds won their first Southern League championship, defeating the Columbus Astros in four games.

=== Playoff bracket ===
Division finals
E1	Columbus	2
E2	Charlotte	0
W1	Nashville	2
W2	Memphis	1

Finals
E1	Columbus	1
W1	Nashville	3

== Awards ==
Southern League awards
Award name	Recipient
Most Valuable Player	Danny Heep, Columbus Astros; Alan Knicely, Columbus Astros
Pitcher of the Year	Geoff Combe, Nashville Sounds
Manager of the Year	Jimmy Johnson, Columbus Astros

== See also ==
- 1979 Major League Baseball season
