= Gene Fodge =

American baseball player (1931–2010)

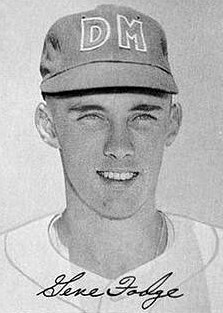
- Pitcher
- Born: July 9, 1931; South Bend, Indiana, U.S.
- Died: October 27, 2010 (aged 79); Mishawaka, Indiana, U.S.
- Batted: Right Threw: Right

MLB debut
- April 20, 1958, for the Chicago Cubs

Last MLB appearance
- July 21, 1958, for the Chicago Cubs

MLB statistics
- Win–loss record: 1–1
- Earned run average: 4.76
- Strikeouts: 15

Teams
- Chicago Cubs (1958)

Gene Arlan "Suds" Fodge (July 9, 1931 – October 27, 2010) was a pitcher in Major League Baseball who played briefly for the Chicago Cubs during the 1958 season. Listed at 6 ft 0 in (1.83 m), Weight: 175 lb., Fodge batted and threw right-handed. He was born in South Bend, Indiana.

Fodge was a 1950 graduate of South Bend Central High School, lettering in baseball, basketball and tennis. He was originally signed by the Cubs as an amateur free-agent in 1950, and was assigned to Class-D Janesville Cubs in 1951. He ended with a 12–13 record and a 3.78 earned run average in his first professional season. He then went on to serve in the U.S. Marine Corps for two years during the Korean War.

Following his discharge, Fodge returned to play in 1954 and posted a 5–4 record with a 3.99 ERA in 29 games for Class-A Des Moines Bruins.

Fodge improved markedly with Des Moines in 1955, going 16–10 with a 2.28 ERA in 36 games, including 29 starts. The next season, he finished 19–7 with a 4.31 ERA in 44 games (25 starts) for the Los Angeles Angels of the Pacific Coast League. In 1957 Fodge pitched Double-A ball with the Fort Worth Cats, Memphis Chickasaws and Portland Beavers, going to a combined 8–14 with a 4.30 ERA in 34 games (22 starts).

Fodge made his big league debut with the Cubs in 1958. Facing the St. Louis Cardinals in his first game, he appeared in relief, pitching two perfect innings and striking out two batters. He compiled a 1–1 record with a 4.76 ERA in 16 games (one start), giving up 22 runs (21 earned) on 47 hits and 11 walks while striking out 15 in 39 2/3 innings of work. His only major league victory came at the expense of the Los Angeles Dodgers, pitching a complete game in a Cubs 15–2 beating at LA Memorial Coliseum, where Dodgers pitchers Don Drysdale, Roger Craig, Ron Negray and Sandy Koufax were unable to hold the visitors in hand.

He returned to Fort Worth for the rest of 1958, finishing with an 8–3 mark and a 2.23 ERA in 14 games. In a six-season minors career, he went 68–51 with a 3.47 ERA in 190 pitching appearances. After his baseball career ended, Fodge returned to South Bend to raise his family. He died in Mishawaka, Indiana, aged 79.

== See also ==
- 1958 Chicago Cubs season
