= Dave Ford =

American baseball player (born 1956)

- Pitcher
- Born: December 29, 1956 (age 68); Cleveland, Ohio, U.S.
- Batted: Right Threw: Right

MLB debut
- September 2, 1978, for the Baltimore Orioles

Last MLB appearance
- September 9, 1981, for the Baltimore Orioles

MLB statistics
- Win–loss record: 5–6
- Earned run average: 4.02
- Strikeouts: 46
- Stats at Baseball Reference

Teams
- Baltimore Orioles (1978–1981)

David Alan Ford (born December 29, 1956) is a former Major League Baseball pitcher for the Baltimore Orioles. Born in Cleveland, Ohio, Ford attended Lincoln-West High School, and after graduating in 1975, was selected with the 23rd pick by the Orioles in the 1975 Major League Baseball draft.

Ford started his career in the minor league with Bluefield and Miami in 1975, pitching 52 and 12 innings respectively for the two clubs. In 1976, while playing for Charlotte of the Southern League, he pitched 212 innings, posted a 17–7 record, and had an ERA of 2.50 over 27 games. For his efforts, Ford was named Southern League's Pitcher of the Year. The next season, he pitched for the Rochester Red Wings of the International League, and finished the season with a 9–14 record and a 4.81 ERA. He spent the 1978 season at Rochester as well, pitching in 15 games, winning six and losing five.

Ford made his major league debut on September 2, 1978 against the Chicago White Sox. he pitched 8 1/3 innings, allowed no runs, struck out two, and received the win. He pitched in one more game during the 1978 season, again not allowing a run, and finished the season with a 1–0 record and an ERA of 0.00. Ford split time between the majors and minors again in 1979, playing in nine major league games and starting two of them. He pitched 30 innings, posted a 2–1 record and had an ERA of 2.10. He became a main part of the roster in 1980, pitching in 25 games, where he pitched nearly 70 innings and had an ERA of 4.26. He played in 15 games the following season, and played in his final major league game on September 9, 1981. He continued to play in the minor leagues for a few years, then retired from baseball in 1985, having last played for the El Paso Diablos.
