= 2010 Holland Series =

The 2010 Holland Series saw DOOR Neptunus defeat L&D Amsterdam, 4 games to 2, to win the club's 13th Dutch Championship, surpassing now-defunct Haarlem Nicols' 12, and their second in a row. The MVP of the series was Australian pitcher Dushan Ruzic of Neptunus, who won Game 2, going 4.2 innings in relief, and Game 5, going 2 innings in relief. He also earned the save in Game 3, going 2.2 innings to close the game, and over series went a total of 9 shut-out innings with 10 strikeouts and 2 walks on 2 hits. Neptunus enjoyed 3 come-from-behind victories over Amsterdam in the 6 game series.
