= Joe Gates =

American baseball player (1954–2010)

- Second baseman
- Born: October 3, 1954; Gary, Indiana, U.S.
- Died: March 28, 2010 (aged 55); Gary, Indiana, U.S.
- Batted: Left Threw: Right

MLB debut
- September 12, 1978, for the Chicago White Sox

Last MLB appearance
- June 24, 1979, for the Chicago White Sox

MLB statistics
- Batting average: .175
- Home runs: 0
- Runs batted in: 2
- Stats at Baseball Reference

Teams
- Chicago White Sox (1978–79)

Joseph Daniel Gates (October 3, 1954 – March 28, 2010) was an American professional baseball player. He played parts of two seasons in Major League Baseball (MLB) for the Chicago White Sox.

His only extra base hit was a triple on May 13, 1979, against the Kansas City Royals. He had come on as a pinch hitter for Don Kessinger and stayed in the game and played second base. The pitcher for the Royals was Eduardo Rodriguez. The hit drove in Greg Pryor in the bottom of the 9th. The final score of the game was Royals 14, White Sox 5.

After his major league career, he entered the coaching ranks. He was the bench coach of the Gary SouthShore RailCats of the Northern League at the time of his death at age 55.

== Sources ==
- Career statistics from Baseball Reference · Baseball Reference (Minors) · Retrosheet · Baseball Almanac
- Retrosheet
