= List of Dominican Summer League champions =

The Dominican Summer League (DSL) is a Minor League Baseball league that operates in the Dominican Republic at the Rookie level, which is the lowest grade below Major League Baseball. A champion has been determined at the end of each season since the league was formed in 1985.

The DSL Dodgers have won eight Dominican Summer League championships, more than any other team, followed by the DSL Giants and DSL Pirates (3) and the DSL Blue Jays, DSL Guardians, DSL Nationals, DSL Phillies, DSL Rangers, DSL Red Sox, and DSL Yankees (2).

== History ==
The league normally holds a postseason championship series between at least its top two teams. The format of the series has varied, with single-game, best-of-three, and best-of-five formats used at different times. In 1990 and 1991, a round-robin tournament was contested between three teams. In 2021, there was no postseason. From 2022 to 2024, eight teams—six division winners and two wild card teams—qualified for the playoffs seeded by winning percentage regardless of division standing. All postseason series were in best-of-three format. As of 2025, 16 teams—8 division winners and 8 wild card teams—qualify. Teams are divided into four pools of four teams each and participate in a round-robin competition called the DSL Cup. The four teams with the best record in each pool advance to the championship bracket of two rounds (semifinals and finals). All postseason series are a best-of-three format.

== Champions ==
Key
Score	Score of the championship series

Champions
Year	Champion	Score	Runner-up	Ref.
1985	Piratas del Atlantico (Note: The 1985 Piratas del Atlantico were a co-op team of the DSL Athletics, DSL Braves, and DSL Dodgers.) (DSL Athletics, DSL Braves, and DSL Dodgers)	3–2	Arroceros Del Nordeste	
1986	Co-op (Chicago, (Note: It is unclear if "Chicago" was the Chicago Cubs or Chicago White Sox.) DSL Astros, DSL Athletics, and DSL Dodgers)	2–0	Co-op (DSL Blue Jays, DSL Braves, DSL Orioles, and DSL Phillies)	
1987	Indios del Valle (Note: The 1987 Indios del Valle were a co-op team of the DSL Orioles, DSL Phillies, and DSL Pirates.) (DSL Orioles, DSL Phillies, and DSL Pirates)	3–2	Piratas del Atlantico (Note: The 1987 Piratas del Atlantico were a co-op team of the DSL Athletics, DSL Braves, and DSL Dodgers.) (DSL Athletics, DSL Braves, and DSL Dodgers)	
1988	DSL Dodgers	2–0	Co-op (DSL Expos and DSL Braves)	
1989	DSL Dodgers	2–0	DSL Athletics	
1990	DSL Pirates	3–1	DSL Giants and DSL Indians (Note: The 1990 championship was decided in a three-team round-robin tournament. The DSL Pirates won, 3–1. The other participants were the DSL Giants (2–2) and DSL Indians (1–3).)	
1991	DSL Blue Jays	6–3	DSL Dodgers and DSL Indians (Note: The 1991 championship was decided in a three-team round-robin tournament. The DSL Blue Jays won, 6–3. The other participants were the DSL Indians (4–4) and DSL Dodgers (4–5).)	
1992	DSL Dodgers 2	2–0	DSL Athletics	
1993	Co-op (DSL Angels and DSL Dodgers)	3–1	DSL Blue Jays East	
1994	DSL Mets	3–1	DSL Mariners	
1995	DSL Hiroshima Toyo Carp	2–0	DSL Indians	
1996	DSL Dodgers Romana	3–2	DSL Athletics	
1997	DSL Dodgers Romana	3–2	DSL Dodgers Santo Domingo	
1998	DSL Athletics West	3–2	DSL Dodgers Romana	
1999	DSL Phillies	3–2	DSL Mets East	
2000	DSL Dodgers	3–2	DSL Brewers	
2001	DSL Brewers	3–2	DSL Phillies	
2002	DSL Indians	3–0	DSL Blue Jays	
2003	DSL Pirates	3–1	DSL Diamondbacks	
2004	DSL Indians	3–2	DSL Yankees	
2005	DSL Yankees 1	3–0	DSL Royals	
2006	DSL Yankees 1	3–1	DSL Marlins	
2007	DSL Nationals 1	3–2	DSL Yankees 1	
2008	DSL Nationals 1	2–1	DSL Giants	
2009	DSL Giants	3–0	DSL Twins	
2010	DSL Giants	3–1	DSL Reds	
2011	DSL Angels	3–0	DSL Orioles	
2012	DSL Pirates 1	3–2	DSL Angels	
2013	DSL Rangers	3–1	DSL Tigers	
2014	DSL Rangers 1	3–1	DSL Red Sox	
2015	DSL Giants	3–0	DSL Rangers 1	
2016	DSL Red Sox 1	3–1	DSL Rangers 1	
2017	DSL Dodgers 2	1–0	DSL Dodgers 1	
2018	DSL Rays 1	3–2	DSL Rangers 1	
2019	DSL Royals 1	3–2	DSL Diamondbacks 2	
2020	None (season canceled due to COVID-19 pandemic)			
2021	DSL Blue Jays	— (Note: No playoffs were held in 2021. The DSL Blue Jays had the league's highest winning percentage (.667, 38–19), making them the de facto league champions. DSL Colorado finished in second-place at .661 (39–20).)	DSL Colorado	
2022	DSL Phillies White	2–1	DSL Rockies	
2023	DSL Dodgers Bautista	2–1	DSL Pirates Gold	
2024	DSL Red Sox Red	2–1	DSL Angels	
2025	DSL Padres Gold	2–1	DSL Athletics	

== Wins by team ==
Active Dominican Summer League teams appear in bold. Championships by co-op teams are listed as co-ops. Championships by split-squad teams (e.g. DSL Yankees 1) are listed by their main team (e.g. DSL Yankees).

Team	Wins	Year(s)
**DSL Dodgers**	8	1988, 1989, 1992, 1996, 1997, 2000, 2017, 2023
**DSL Giants**	3	2009, 2010, 2015
**DSL Pirates**	3	1990, 2003, 2012
**DSL Blue Jays**	2	1991, 2021
**DSL Guardians** (DSL Indians)	2	2002, 2004
**DSL Nationals**	2	2007, 2008
**DSL Phillies**	2	1999, 2022
**DSL Rangers**	2	2013, 2014
**DSL Red Sox**	2	2016, 2024
**DSL Yankees**	2	2005, 2006
Co-op (Chicago, DSL Astros, DSL Athletics, and DSL Dodgers)	1	1986
Co-op (DSL Angels and DSL Dodgers)	1	1993
**DSL Angels**	1	2011
**DSL Athletics**	1	1998
**DSL Brewers**	1	2001
DSL Hiroshima Toyo Carp	1	1995
**DSL Mets**	1	1994
**DSL Padres**	1	2025
**DSL Rays**	1	2018
**DSL Royals**	1	2019
Indios del Valle (DSL Orioles, DSL Phillies, and DSL Pirates)	1	1987
Piratas del Atlantico (DSL Athletics, DSL Braves, and DSL Dodgers)	1	1985
