= List of Milwaukee Brewers minor league affiliates =

Current Milwaukee Brewers domestic minor league affiliate locations

The Milwaukee Brewers farm system consists of seven Minor League Baseball affiliates across the United States and in the Dominican Republic. Four teams are owned by the major league club, while three—the Nashville Sounds, Biloxi Shuckers, and Wisconsin Timber Rattlers—are independently owned.

The Brewers have been affiliated with the High-A Wisconsin Timber Rattlers of the Midwest League since 2009, making it the longest-running active affiliation in the organization among teams not owned by the Brewers. The longest affiliation in franchise history was with the Helena Gold Sox/Brewers, who were the team's Rookie affiliate in the Pioneer League for 32 seasons from 1985 to 2000 and 2002 to 2018. The longest continuous affiliation was the 23-year partnership with the Beloit Brewers/Snappers of the Class A Midwest League from 1982 to 2004. Their newest affiliate is the Wilson Warbirds of the Carolina League, which became the Brewers' Single-A club in 2026.

A total of 31 league championships have been won by 20 different teams during their partnerships with Milwaukee. Of these, the Arizona Complex League Brewers of the Rookie Arizona Complex League (ACL) have won five titles, more than any other team. The Stockton Ports, a Class A-Advanced affiliate in the California League, won four titles, more than any other independently owned club. Additionally, two Triple-A teams each won the championship of their classification. The Denver Zephyrs of the American Association won the 1991 Triple-A Classic, and the International League's Indianapolis Indians won the 2000 Triple-A World Series.

Geographically, Milwaukee's closest domestic affiliate is the Wisconsin Timber Rattlers, which are approximately 90 miles (140 km) away. Milwaukee's furthest domestic affiliate is the ACL Brewers some 1,462 miles (2,353 km) away.

== Current affiliates ==
The Milwaukee Brewers farm system consists of seven minor league affiliates.

Current minor league affiliates
Class	Team	League	Location	Ballpark	Affiliated
Triple-A	Nashville Sounds	International League	Nashville, Tennessee	First Horizon Park	2021
Double-A	Biloxi Shuckers	Southern League	Biloxi, Mississippi	Keesler Federal Park	2015
High-A	Wisconsin Timber Rattlers	Midwest League	Grand Chute, Wisconsin	Neuroscience Group Field at Fox Cities Stadium	2009
Single-A	Wilson Warbirds	Carolina League	Wilson, North Carolina	Wilson Ballpark	2026
Rookie	ACL Brewers	Arizona Complex League	Phoenix, Arizona	American Family Fields of Phoenix	2001
Rookie	DSL Brewers Blue	Dominican Summer League	Santo Domingo Este, Santo Domingo	Dominican Republic Academy	2010
Rookie	DSL Brewers Gold	Dominican Summer League	Santo Domingo Este, Santo Domingo	Dominican Republic Academy	2021

== Past affiliates ==
=== Key ===
Key
Season	Each year is linked to an article about that particular Brewers season.
†	League champions

=== 1968–1989 ===
Prior to the 1963 season, Major League Baseball (MLB) initiated a reorganization of Minor League Baseball that resulted in a reduction from six classes to four (Triple-A, Double-A, Class A, and Rookie) in response to the general decline of the minors throughout the 1950s and early-1960s when leagues and teams folded due to shrinking attendance caused by baseball fans' preference for staying at home to watch MLB games on television. The only change made within the next 27 years was Class A being subdivided for the first time to form Class A Short Season in 1966.

Minor league affiliates (1968–1989)
Season	Triple-A	Double-A	Class A	Class A Short Season	Rookie	Ref(s).
1968	—	—	—	Newark Co-Pilots	—	
1969	Vancouver Mounties (Note: In 1969, the Pilots operated the Vancouver Mounties as a co-op with the Montreal Expos.)	—	Clinton Pilots	Newark Co-Pilots	Billings Mustangs	
1970	Portland Beavers	Jacksonville Suns (Note: In 1970, the Brewers operated the Jacksonville Suns as a co-op with the Montreal Expos.)	Clinton Pilots	Newark Co-Pilots	—	
1971	Evansville Triplets	—	Danville Warriors	Newark Co-Pilots	—	
1972	Evansville Triplets^{†} (Note: The Evansville Triplets won the 1972 American Association championship.)	San Antonio Brewers	Danville Warriors^{†} (Note: The Danville Warriors won the 1972 Midwest League championship.)	Newark Co-Pilots	—	
1973	Evansville Triplets	Shreveport Captains	Danville Warriors	Newark Co-Pilots	—	
1974	Sacramento Solons	Shreveport Captains	Danville Warriors^{†} (Note: The Danville Warriors won the 1974 Midwest League championship.)	Newark Co-Pilots	—	
1975	Sacramento Solons	Thetford Mines Miners	Burlington Bees	Newark Co-Pilots^{†} (Note: The Newark Co-Pilots won the 1975 New York–Penn League championship.)	—	
1976	Spokane Indians	Berkshire Brewers	Burlington Bees	Newark Co-Pilots	—	
1977	Spokane Indians	Holyoke Millers	Burlington Bees^{†} (Note: The Burlington Bees won the 1977 Midwest League championship.)	Newark Co-Pilots	—	
1978	Spokane Indians	Holyoke Millers	Burlington Bees	Newark Co-Pilots	—	
1979	Vancouver Canadians	Holyoke Millers	Burlington Bees	—	Butte Copper Kings	
1979	Vancouver Canadians	Holyoke Millers	Stockton Ports	—	Butte Copper Kings	
1980	Vancouver Canadians	Holyoke Millers^{†} (Note: The Holyoke Millers won the 1980 Eastern League championship.)	Burlington Bees	—	Butte Copper Kings	
1980	Vancouver Canadians	Holyoke Millers^{†}	Stockton Ports^{†} (Note: The Stockton Ports won the 1980 California League championship.)	—	Butte Copper Kings	
1981	Vancouver Canadians	El Paso Diablos	Burlington Bees	—	Butte Copper Kings^{†} (Note: The Butte Copper Kings won the 1981 Pioneer League championship.)	
1981	Vancouver Canadians	El Paso Diablos	Stockton Ports	—	Butte Copper Kings^{†}	
1982	Vancouver Canadians	El Paso Diablos	Beloit Brewers	—	Pikeville Brewers	
1982	Vancouver Canadians	El Paso Diablos	Stockton Ports	—	Pikeville Brewers	
1983	Vancouver Canadians	El Paso Diablos	Beloit Brewers	—	Paintsville Brewers^{†} (Note: The Paintsville Brewers won the 1983 Appalachian League championship.)	
1983	Vancouver Canadians	El Paso Diablos	Stockton Ports	—	Paintsville Brewers^{†}	
1984	Vancouver Canadians	El Paso Diablos	Beloit Brewers	—	Paintsville Brewers	
1984	Vancouver Canadians	El Paso Diablos	Stockton Ports	—	Paintsville Brewers	
1985	Vancouver Canadians^{†} (Note: The Vancouver Canadians won the 1985 Pacific Coast League championship.)	El Paso Diablos	Beloit Brewers	—	Helena Gold Sox	
1985	Vancouver Canadians^{†}	El Paso Diablos	Stockton Ports	—	Helena Gold Sox	
1986	Vancouver Canadians	El Paso Diablos^{†} (Note: The El Paso Diablos won the 1986 Texas League championship.)	Beloit Brewers	—	Helena Gold Sox	
1986	Vancouver Canadians	El Paso Diablos^{†}	Stockton Ports^{†} (Note: The Stockton Ports won the 1986 California League championship.)	—	Helena Gold Sox	
1987	Denver Zephyrs	El Paso Diablos	Beloit Brewers	—	Helena Brewers	
1987	Denver Zephyrs	El Paso Diablos	Stockton Ports	—	Helena Brewers	
1988	Denver Zephyrs	El Paso Diablos	Beloit Brewers	—	Helena Brewers	
1988	Denver Zephyrs	El Paso Diablos	Stockton Ports	—	AZL Brewers^{†} (Note: The AZL Brewers won the 1988 Arizona League championship.)	
1989	Denver Zephyrs	El Paso Diablos	Beloit Brewers	—	Helena Brewers	
1989	Denver Zephyrs	El Paso Diablos	Stockton Ports	—	AZL Brewers^{†} (Note: The AZL Brewers won the 1989 Arizona League championship.)	
1989	Denver Zephyrs	El Paso Diablos	Stockton Ports	—	DSL Brewers/Orioles/Red Sox (Note: In 1989, the Brewers operated a Dominican Summer League team as a co-op with the Baltimore Orioles and Boston Red Sox.)	

=== 1990–2020 ===
Minor League Baseball operated with six classes from 1990 to 2020. In 1990, the Class A level was subdivided for a second time with the creation of Class A-Advanced. The Rookie level consisted of domestic and foreign circuits. The Brewers did not field a Class A Short Season team during this period.

Minor league affiliates (1990–2020)
Season	Triple-A	Double-A	Class A-Advanced	Class A	Rookie	Foreign Rookie	Ref(s).
1990	Denver Zephyrs	El Paso Diablos	Stockton Ports^{†} (Note: The Stockton Ports won the 1990 California League championship.)	Beloit Brewers	Helena Brewers	DSL Brewers/Blue Jays (Note: In 1990, the Brewers operated a Dominican Summer League team as a co-op with the Toronto Blue Jays.)	
1990	Denver Zephyrs	El Paso Diablos	Stockton Ports^{†}	Beloit Brewers	AZL Brewers^{†} (Note: The AZL Brewers won the 1990 Arizona League championship.)	DSL Brewers/Blue Jays	
1991	Denver Zephyrs^{†} (Note: The Denver Zephyrs won the 1991 American Association championship and the Triple-A Classic.)	El Paso Diablos	Stockton Ports	Beloit Brewers	Helena Brewers	DSL Brewers	
1991	Denver Zephyrs^{†}	El Paso Diablos	Stockton Ports	Beloit Brewers	AZL Brewers	DSL Brewers	
1992	Denver Zephyrs	El Paso Diablos	Stockton Ports^{†} (Note: The Stockton Ports won the 1992 California League championship.)	Beloit Brewers	Helena Brewers	DSL Brewers	
1992	Denver Zephyrs	El Paso Diablos	Stockton Ports^{†}	Beloit Brewers	AZL Brewers	DSL Brewers	
1993	New Orleans Zephyrs	El Paso Diablos	Stockton Ports	Beloit Brewers	Helena Brewers	DSL Brewers	
1993	New Orleans Zephyrs	El Paso Diablos	Stockton Ports	Beloit Brewers	AZL Brewers	DSL Brewers	
1994	New Orleans Zephyrs	El Paso Diablos^{†} (Note: The El Paso Diablos won the 1994 Texas League championship.)	Stockton Ports	Beloit Brewers	Helena Brewers	DSL Brewers/Astros (Note: In 1994, the Brewers operated a Dominican Summer League team as a co-op with the Houston Astros.)	
1994	New Orleans Zephyrs	El Paso Diablos^{†}	Stockton Ports	Beloit Brewers	AZL Brewers	DSL Brewers/Astros	
1995	New Orleans Zephyrs	El Paso Diablos	Stockton Ports	Beloit Snappers^{†} (Note: The Beloit Snappers won the 1995 Midwest League championship.)	Helena Brewers^{†} (Note: The Helena Brewers won the 1995 Pioneer League championship.)	DSL Brewers/Astros (Note: In 1995, the Brewers operated a Dominican Summer League team as a co-op with the Houston Astros.)	
1995	New Orleans Zephyrs	El Paso Diablos	Stockton Ports	Beloit Snappers^{†}	AZL Brewers	DSL Brewers/Astros	
1996	New Orleans Zephyrs	El Paso Diablos	Stockton Ports	Beloit Snappers	Helena Brewers^{†} (Note: The Helena Brewers won the 1996 Pioneer League championship.)	DSL Brewers/White Sox (Note: In 1996, the Brewers operated a Dominican Summer League team as a co-op with the Chicago White Sox.)	
1996	New Orleans Zephyrs	El Paso Diablos	Stockton Ports	Beloit Snappers	Ogden Raptors	DSL Brewers/White Sox	
1997	Tucson Toros	El Paso Diablos	Stockton Ports	Beloit Snappers	Helena Brewers	DSL Brewers	
1997	Tucson Toros	El Paso Diablos	Stockton Ports	Beloit Snappers	Ogden Raptors	DSL Brewers	
1998	Louisville Redbirds	El Paso Diablos	Stockton Ports	Beloit Snappers	Helena Brewers	DSL Brewers	
1998	Louisville Redbirds	El Paso Diablos	Stockton Ports	Beloit Snappers	Ogden Raptors	VSL Guacara 1 (Note: In 1998, the Brewers operated a Venezuelan Summer League team as a co-op with the Florida Marlins and San Francisco Giants.)^{†} (Note: VSL Guacara 1 won the 1998 Venezuelan Summer League championship.)	
1999	Louisville RiverBats	Huntsville Stars	Stockton Ports	Beloit Snappers	Helena Brewers	DSL Brewers	
1999	Louisville RiverBats	Huntsville Stars	Stockton Ports	Beloit Snappers	Ogden Raptors	VSL La Victoria (Note: In 1999, the Brewers operated a Venezuelan Summer League team as a co-op with the Philadelphia Phillies and San Francisco Giants.)	
2000	Indianapolis Indians^{†} (Note: The Indianapolis Indians won the 2000 International League championship and the Triple-A World Series.)	Huntsville Stars	Mudville Nine	Beloit Snappers	Helena Brewers	DSL Brewers	
2000	Indianapolis Indians^{†}	Huntsville Stars	Mudville Nine	Beloit Snappers	Ogden Raptors	VSL San Joaquín (Note: In 2000, the Brewers operated a Venezuelan Summer League team as a co-op with the Boston Red Sox and Minnesota Twins.)	
2001	Indianapolis Indians	Huntsville Stars^{†} (Note: The Huntsville Stars won the 2001 Southern League championship.)	High Desert Mavericks	Beloit Snappers	Ogden Raptors	DSL Brewers^{†} (Note: The DSL Brewers won the 2001 Dominican Summer League championship.)	
2001	Indianapolis Indians	Huntsville Stars^{†}	High Desert Mavericks	Beloit Snappers	AZL Brewers	VSL San Joaquín (Note: In 2001, the Brewers operated a Venezuelan Summer League team as a co-op with the Boston Red Sox and Minnesota Twins.)	
2002	Indianapolis Indians	Huntsville Stars	High Desert Mavericks	Beloit Snappers	Ogden Raptors	DSL Brewers	
2002	Indianapolis Indians	Huntsville Stars	High Desert Mavericks	Beloit Snappers	AZL Brewers	VSL Ciudad Alianza (Note: In 2002, the Brewers operated a Venezuelan Summer League team as a co-op with the Boston Red Sox.)	
2003	Indianapolis Indians	Huntsville Stars	High Desert Mavericks	Beloit Snappers	Helena Brewers	DSL Brewers	
2003	Indianapolis Indians	Huntsville Stars	High Desert Mavericks	Beloit Snappers	AZL Brewers	VSL Cagua (Note: In 2003, the Brewers operated a Venezuelan Summer League team as a co-op with the Cincinnati Reds.)	
2004	Indianapolis Indians	Huntsville Stars	High Desert Mavericks	Beloit Snappers	Helena Brewers	—	
2004	Indianapolis Indians	Huntsville Stars	High Desert Mavericks	Beloit Snappers	AZL Brewers	—	
2005	Nashville Sounds^{†} (Note: The Nashville Sounds won the 2005 Pacific Coast League championship.)	Huntsville Stars	Brevard County Manatees	West Virginia Power	Helena Brewers	—	
2005	Nashville Sounds^{†}	Huntsville Stars	Brevard County Manatees	West Virginia Power	AZL Brewers	—	
2006	Nashville Sounds	Huntsville Stars	Brevard County Manatees	West Virginia Power	Helena Brewers	—	
2006	Nashville Sounds	Huntsville Stars	Brevard County Manatees	West Virginia Power	AZL Brewers	—	
2007	Nashville Sounds	Huntsville Stars	Brevard County Manatees	West Virginia Power	Helena Brewers	—	
2007	Nashville Sounds	Huntsville Stars	Brevard County Manatees	West Virginia Power	AZL Brewers	—	
2008	Nashville Sounds	Huntsville Stars	Brevard County Manatees	West Virginia Power	Helena Brewers	—	
2008	Nashville Sounds	Huntsville Stars	Brevard County Manatees	West Virginia Power	AZL Brewers	—	
2009	Nashville Sounds	Huntsville Stars	Brevard County Manatees	Wisconsin Timber Rattlers	Helena Brewers	DSL Brewers/Orioles (Note: In 2009, the Brewers operated a Dominican Summer League team as a co-op with the Baltimore Orioles.)	
2009	Nashville Sounds	Huntsville Stars	Brevard County Manatees	Wisconsin Timber Rattlers	AZL Brewers	DSL Brewers/Orioles	
2010	Nashville Sounds	Huntsville Stars	Brevard County Manatees	Wisconsin Timber Rattlers	Helena Brewers^{†} (Note: The Helena Brewers won the 2010 Pioneer League championship.)	DSL Brewers	
2010	Nashville Sounds	Huntsville Stars	Brevard County Manatees	Wisconsin Timber Rattlers	AZL Brewers^{†} (Note: The AZL Brewers won the 2010 Arizona League championship.)	DSL Brewers	
2011	Nashville Sounds	Huntsville Stars	Brevard County Manatees	Wisconsin Timber Rattlers	Helena Brewers	DSL Brewers	
2011	Nashville Sounds	Huntsville Stars	Brevard County Manatees	Wisconsin Timber Rattlers	AZL Brewers	DSL Brewers	
2012	Nashville Sounds	Huntsville Stars	Brevard County Manatees	Wisconsin Timber Rattlers^{†} (Note: The Wisconsin Timber Rattlers won the 2012 Midwest League championship.)	Helena Brewers	DSL Brewers	
2012	Nashville Sounds	Huntsville Stars	Brevard County Manatees	Wisconsin Timber Rattlers^{†}	AZL Brewers	DSL Brewers	
2013	Nashville Sounds	Huntsville Stars	Brevard County Manatees	Wisconsin Timber Rattlers	Helena Brewers	DSL Brewers	
2013	Nashville Sounds	Huntsville Stars	Brevard County Manatees	Wisconsin Timber Rattlers	AZL Brewers	DSL Brewers	
2014	Nashville Sounds	Huntsville Stars	Brevard County Manatees	Wisconsin Timber Rattlers	Helena Brewers	DSL Brewers	
2014	Nashville Sounds	Huntsville Stars	Brevard County Manatees	Wisconsin Timber Rattlers	AZL Brewers	DSL Brewers	
2015	Colorado Springs Sky Sox	Biloxi Shuckers	Brevard County Manatees	Wisconsin Timber Rattlers	Helena Brewers	DSL Brewers	
2015	Colorado Springs Sky Sox	Biloxi Shuckers	Brevard County Manatees	Wisconsin Timber Rattlers	AZL Brewers	DSL Brewers	
2016	Colorado Springs Sky Sox	Biloxi Shuckers	Brevard County Manatees	Wisconsin Timber Rattlers	Helena Brewers	DSL Brewers	
2016	Colorado Springs Sky Sox	Biloxi Shuckers	Brevard County Manatees	Wisconsin Timber Rattlers	AZL Brewers	DSL Brewers	
2017	Colorado Springs Sky Sox	Biloxi Shuckers	Carolina Mudcats	Wisconsin Timber Rattlers	Helena Brewers	DSL Brewers	
2017	Colorado Springs Sky Sox	Biloxi Shuckers	Carolina Mudcats	Wisconsin Timber Rattlers	AZL Brewers	DSL Brewers/Indians (Note: In 2017, the Brewers operated a Dominican Summer League team as a co-op with the Cleveland Indians.)	
2018	Colorado Springs Sky Sox	Biloxi Shuckers	Carolina Mudcats	Wisconsin Timber Rattlers	Helena Brewers	DSL Brewers	
2018	Colorado Springs Sky Sox	Biloxi Shuckers	Carolina Mudcats	Wisconsin Timber Rattlers	AZL Brewers	DSL Brewers/Indians (Note: In 2018, the Brewers operated a Dominican Summer League team as a co-op with the Cleveland Indians.)	
2019	San Antonio Missions	Biloxi Shuckers	Carolina Mudcats	Wisconsin Timber Rattlers	Rocky Mountain Vibes	DSL Brewers	
2019	San Antonio Missions	Biloxi Shuckers	Carolina Mudcats	Wisconsin Timber Rattlers	AZL Brewers Blue	DSL Brewers/Indians (Note: In 2019, the Brewers operated a Dominican Summer League team as a co-op with the Cleveland Indians.)	
2019	San Antonio Missions	Biloxi Shuckers	Carolina Mudcats	Wisconsin Timber Rattlers	AZL Brewers Gold	DSL Brewers/Indians	
2020 (Note: The 2020 Minor League Baseball season was cancelled due to the COVID-19 pandemic.)	San Antonio Missions	Biloxi Shuckers	Carolina Mudcats	Wisconsin Timber Rattlers	Rocky Mountain Vibes	DSL Brewers	
2020	San Antonio Missions	Biloxi Shuckers	Carolina Mudcats	Wisconsin Timber Rattlers	AZL Brewers Blue	DSL Brewers/Blue Jays (Note: In 2020, the Brewers planned to operate a Dominican Summer League team as a co-op with the Toronto Blue Jays.)	
2020	San Antonio Missions	Biloxi Shuckers	Carolina Mudcats	Wisconsin Timber Rattlers	AZL Brewers Gold	DSL Brewers/Blue Jays	

=== 2021–present ===
The current structure of Minor League Baseball is the result of an overall contraction of the system beginning with the 2021 season. Class A was reduced to two levels: High-A and Low-A. Low-A was reclassified as Single-A in 2022.

Minor league affiliates (2021–present)
Season	Triple-A	Double-A	High-A	Single-A	Rookie	Foreign Rookie	Ref.
2021	Nashville Sounds	Biloxi Shuckers	Wisconsin Timber Rattlers	Carolina Mudcats	ACL Brewers Blue	DSL Brewers 1	
2021	Nashville Sounds	Biloxi Shuckers	Wisconsin Timber Rattlers	Carolina Mudcats	ACL Brewers Gold	DSL Brewers 2	
2022	Nashville Sounds	Biloxi Shuckers	Wisconsin Timber Rattlers	Carolina Mudcats	ACL Brewers Blue	DSL Brewers 1	
2022	Nashville Sounds	Biloxi Shuckers	Wisconsin Timber Rattlers	Carolina Mudcats	ACL Brewers Gold	DSL Brewers 2	
2023	Nashville Sounds	Biloxi Shuckers	Wisconsin Timber Rattlers	Carolina Mudcats	ACL Brewers^{†} (Note: The ACL Brewers won the 2023 Arizona Complex League championship.)	DSL Brewers 1	
2023	Nashville Sounds	Biloxi Shuckers	Wisconsin Timber Rattlers	Carolina Mudcats	ACL Brewers^{†}	DSL Brewers 2	
2024	Nashville Sounds	Biloxi Shuckers	Wisconsin Timber Rattlers	Carolina Mudcats	ACL Brewers	DSL Brewers 1	
2024	Nashville Sounds	Biloxi Shuckers	Wisconsin Timber Rattlers	Carolina Mudcats	ACL Brewers	DSL Brewers 2	
2025	Nashville Sounds	Biloxi Shuckers	Wisconsin Timber Rattlers	Carolina Mudcats	ACL Brewers	DSL Brewers Blue	
2025	Nashville Sounds	Biloxi Shuckers	Wisconsin Timber Rattlers	Carolina Mudcats	ACL Brewers	DSL Brewers Gold	
2026	Nashville Sounds	Biloxi Shuckers	Wisconsin Timber Rattlers	Wilson Warbirds	ACL Brewers	DSL Brewers Blue	
2026	Nashville Sounds	Biloxi Shuckers	Wisconsin Timber Rattlers	Wilson Warbirds	ACL Brewers	DSL Brewers Gold	

== Affiliation totals ==
=== Affiliations by length ===
Active affiliates appear in bold.

Minor league affiliations by length
Team	Seasons	Year(s)
Helena Brewers (Helena Gold Sox)	32	1985–2000, 2003–2018
**ACL Brewers** (AZL Brewers)	30	1988–1995, 2001–2018, 2023–2026
Beloit Snappers (Beloit Brewers)	23	1982–2004
Stockton Ports (Mudville Nine)	22	1979–2000
DSL Brewers	21	1991–1993, 1997–2003, 2010–2020
El Paso Diablos	18	1981–1998
**Wisconsin Timber Rattlers**	18	2009–2026
Huntsville Stars	16	1999–2014
**Nashville Sounds**	16	2005–2014, 2021–2026
**Biloxi Shuckers**	12	2015–2026
Brevard County Manatees	12	2005–2016
Newark Co-Pilots	11	1968–1978
DSL Brewers (co-op teams)	10	1989–1990, 1994–1996, 2009, 2017–2020
Carolina Mudcats	9	2017–2025
Vancouver Canadians	8	1979–1986
Burlington Bees	7	1975–1981
Ogden Raptors	7	1996–2002
Denver Zephyrs	6	1987–1992
**DSL Brewers Blue** (DSL Brewers 1)	6	2021–2026
**DSL Brewers Gold** (DSL Brewers 2)	6	2021–2026
Indianapolis Indians	5	2000–2004
ACL Brewers Blue (AZL Brewers Blue)	4	2019–2022
ACL Brewers Gold (AZL Brewers Gold)	4	2019–2022
Colorado Springs Sky Sox	4	2015–2018
Danville Warriors	4	1971–1974
High Desert Mavericks	4	2001–2004
Holyoke Millers	4	1977–1980
New Orleans Zephyrs	4	1993–1996
West Virginia Power	4	2005–2008
Butte Copper Kings	3	1979–1981
Evansville Triplets	3	1971–1973
San Antonio Missions (San Antonio Brewers)	3	1972, 2019–2020
Spokane Indians	3	1976–1978
Clinton Pilots	2	1969–1970
Louisville RiverBats (Louisville Redbirds)	2	1998–1999
Paintsville Brewers	2	1983–1984
Rocky Mountain Vibes	2	2019–2020
Sacramento Solons	2	1974–1975
Shreveport Captains	2	1973–1974
VSL San Joaquín	2	2000–2001
Berkshire Brewers	1	1976
Billings Mustangs	1	1969
Jacksonville Suns	1	1970
Pikeville Brewers	1	1982
Portland Beavers	1	1970
Thetford Mines Miners	1	1975
Tucson Toros	1	1997
Vancouver Mounties	1	1969
VSL Cagua	1	2003
VSL Ciudad Alianza	1	2002
VSL Guacara 1	1	1998
VSL La Victoria	1	1999
**Wilson Warbirds**	1	2026

=== Affiliations by league championships ===
Active affiliates appear in bold.

Minor league affiliations by league championships
Team	Wins	Year(s)
**ACL Brewers** (AZL Brewers)	5	1988, 1989, 1990, 2010, 2023
Stockton Ports	4	1980, 1986, 1990, 1992
Helena Brewers	3	1995, 1996, 2010
Danville Warriors	2	1972, 1974
El Paso Diablos	2	1986, 1994
Beloit Snappers	1	1995
Burlington Bees	1	1977
Butte Copper Kings	1	1981
Denver Zephyrs	1	1991
DSL Brewers	1	2001
Evansville Triplets	1	1972
Holyoke Millers	1	1980
Huntsville Stars	1	2001
Indianapolis Indians	1	2000
**Nashville Sounds**	1	2005
Newark Co-Pilots	1	1975
Paintsville Brewers	1	1983
Vancouver Canadians	1	1985
VSL Guacara 1	1	1998
**Wisconsin Timber Rattlers**	1	2012

== Notes ==
General

League champions
