= Dominican Summer League Brewers =

Minor League Baseball team based in Santo Domingo Este, Santo Domingo

- Founded in 1989; (1989–2003, 2009–present); Santo Domingo Este, Santo Domingo

Minor league affiliations
- Class: Rookie (1989–2003, 2009–present)
- League: Dominican Summer League (1989–2003, 2009–present)
- Division: Northwest Division (Blue); Central Division (Gold)

Major league affiliations
- Team: Milwaukee Brewers (1991–1993, 1997–2003, 2010–present)

Minor league titles
- League titles (1): 2001
- Division titles (1): 2026
- Wild card berths (1): 2011

Team data
- Name: DSL Brewers (1991–1993, 1997–2003, 2010–present)
- Previous names: DSL Brewers/Blue Jays (2020); DSL Brewers/Indians (2017–2019); DSL Brewers/Orioles (2009); DSL Brewers/White Sox (1996); DSL Brewers/Astros (1994–1995); DSL Brewers/Blue Jays (1990); DSL Brewers/Orioles/Red Sox (1989)
- Colors: Navy blue, yellow
- Ballpark: Dominican Republic Academy (2024–present); Tower Complex (2012–2023)
- Owner/ Operator: Milwaukee Brewers
- Manager: Victor Rey (Blue); Natanael Mejia (Gold)

The Dominican Summer League Brewers are a Minor League Baseball team of the Dominican Summer League (DSL) and a Rookie affiliate of the Milwaukee Brewers. They are located in Santo Domingo Este, Santo Domingo, Dominican Republic. They play their home games at the Milwaukee Brewers Dominican Republic Academy, which opened in 2024. They previously played at the Tower Complex from 2012 to 2023.

The Milwaukee Brewers began fielding teams in the Dominican Summer League in 1989, though several teams were operated as co-ops in partnership with other Major League Baseball clubs. The DSL Brewers have played continuously since 2010 following previous stretches from 1991 to 1993 and 1997 to 2003. Milwaukee currently operates two DSL teams: the DSL Brewers Blue and DSL Brewers Gold. From 2021 to 2024, they were known the DSL Brewers 1 and DSL Brewers 2, respectively.

The Brewers won their lone DSL championship in 2001.

== History ==
The Milwaukee Brewers entered the Dominican Summer League (DSL) in 1989 as part of a co-op team shared with the Boston Red Sox and Baltimore Orioles. In 1990, they ran a co-op with the Toronto Blue Jays. The Brewers had their first solo DSL team for three seasons from 1991 to 1993. They reverted to the co-op approach after this stretch, partnering with the Houston Astros in 1994 and 1995 and the Chicago White Sox in 1996.

From 1997 to 2003, the Brewers once again operated their own team. The 2000 club reached the championship finals but lost to the DSL Dodgers, 3–2. The 2001 DSL Brewers, managed by Mike Guerrero, won the DSL championship versus the DSL Phillies, 3–2.

Milwaukee left the DSL after the 2003 campaign and did not return until 2009 in partnership with Baltimore. They fielded their own squad from 2010 to 2016. The 2011 DSL Brewers qualified for the playoffs with a wild card berth but were eliminated in the first round by the DSL Orioles, 2–1.

The DSL Brewers began operating out of the Tower Complex in Ramón Santana in 2012. Built in 2006, the facility was owned and operated by former Milwaukee closer Salomón Torres and was previously home to the Texas Rangers' Dominican operations.

From 2017 to 2019, the Brewers partnered with the Cleveland Indians to field a second team in addition to their own. They planned to have a co-op team with Toronto in 2020, but the season was cancelled due to the COVID-19 pandemic. Since 2021, Milwaukee has operated two DSL teams.

Following the 2023 season, the Brewers opened the new Dominican Republic Academy on a 30-acre (12 ha) site in Santo Domingo Este. Owned by the Brewers, the facility includes three full fields, an infield, a four-tunnel indoor batting facility, and classrooms among other amenities. In 2025, the names DSL Brewers 1 and DSL Brewers 2 were changed to DSL Brewers Blue and DSL Brewers Gold, respectively, for the team's colors.

The 2026 Brewers Gold team won the Central Division title, qualifying them for the DSL Cup to determine the league championship. Despite going 2–1 in pool play and being in a three-way tie for first place with the DSL Mariners and DSL Giants Black, only the Giants advanced as they were the highest seed in the pool—eighth overall compared to the Brewers as the ninth seed.

== Season-by-season records ==
Key
League	The team's final position in the league standings
Division	The team's final position in the divisional standings
GB	Games behind the team that finished in first place in the division that season
Season^{#}	Number indicates DSL Brewers 1 or DSL Brewers 2
Season^{color}	Color indicates DSL Brewers Blue or DSL Brewers Gold
†	League champions
*	Division champions
^	Postseason berth

DSL Brewers season-by-season records
Season	Regular-season					Postseason			Ref.
Season	Record	Win %	League	Division	GB	Record	Win %	Result	Ref.
1991	—	—	—	—	—	—	—	Result	—
1992	17–53	.243	20th	4th	51	—	—	—	
1993	—	—	—	—	—	—	—	—	
1997	—	—	—	—	—	—	—	—	
1998	—	—	—	—	—	—	—	—	
1999	—	—	—	—	—	—	—	—	
2000^	—	—	—	—	—	2–3	.400	Lost DSL championship vs. DSL Dodgers, 3–2	
2001 †	—	—	—	—	—	3–2	.600	Won DSL championship vs. DSL Phillies, 3–2	
2002	—	—	—	—	—	—	—	—	
2003	—	—	—	—	—	—	—	—	
2010	28–43	.394	27th	4th	15	—	—	—	
2011^	44–27	.620	6th	2nd	2	1–2	.333	Clinched wild card berth Lost quarterfinals vs. DSL Orioles, 2–1	
2012	26–39	.400	28th (tie)	5th	14 1/2	—	—	—	
2013	26–45	.366	30th (tie)	4th	22 1/2	—	—	—	
2014	27–43	.386	29th (tie)	4th	23 1/2	—	—	—	
2015	32–40	.444	23rd (tie)	6th (tie)	14	—	—	—	
2016	26–44	.371	37th	8th	24 1/2	—	—	—	
2017	28–43	.394	32nd (tie)	6th	22	—	—	—	
2018	40–32	.556	15th (tie)	3rd	11	—	—	—	
2019	36–36	.500	20th (tie)	4th	9 1/2	—	—	—	
2020	Season cancelled (COVID-19 pandemic)								
2021^{1}	31–28	.525	19th (tie)	3rd	6 1/2	—	—	—	
2021^{2}	29–30	.492	24th (tie)	5th	10	—	—	—	
2022^{1}	22–37	.373	41st	7th	18	—	—	—	
2022^{2}	27–32	.458	28th	6th	13	—	—	—	
2023^{1}	25–27	.481	29th (tie)	3rd (tie)	16 1/2	—	—	—	
2023^{2}	22–31	.415	37th (tie)	6th	20	—	—	—	
2024^{1}	32–23	.582	14th	2nd	5 1/2	—	—	—	
2024^{2}	30–23	.566	15th	3rd	4 1/2	—	—	—	
2025^{Blue}	29–25	.537	22nd	3rd	9	—	—	—	
2025^{Gold}	27–29	.482	28th (tie)	3rd	4	—	—	—	
2026^{Blue}	31–24	.564	20th (tie)	3rd	8 1/2	—	—	—	
2026^{Gold} *	34–20	.630	9th	1st	—	2–1	.667	Won Central Division title Eliminated in pool play, 2–1	
Totals	669–774	.464	—	—	—	8–8	.500	—	—

Co-op teams season-by-season records
Season	Regular-season					Postseason			Co-op partner(s)	Ref.
Season	Record	Win %	League	Division	GB	Record	Win %	Result	Co-op partner(s)	Ref.
1989	—	—	—	—	—	—	—	Result	—	Baltimore Orioles; Boston Red Sox
1990	—	—	—	—	—	—	—	—	Toronto Blue Jays	
1994	36–34	.514	11th	4th	4	—	—	—	Houston Astros	
1995	28–39	.418	15th	5th	28	—	—	—	Houston Astros	
1996	32–38	.457	15th	5th	15 1/2	—	—	—	Chicago White Sox	
2009	27–43	.386	28th	11th	24 1/2	—	—	—	Baltimore Orioles	
2017	26–44	.371	35th (tie)	8th	17	—	—	—	Cleveland Indians	
2018	21–49	.300	42nd	8th	26	—	—	—	Cleveland Indians	
2019	17–52	.246	45th	8th	37 1/2	—	—	—	Cleveland Indians	
2020	Season cancelled (COVID-19 pandemic)								Toronto Blue Jays	
Totals	187–299	.385	—	—	—	—	—	—	—	—

== Rosters ==
Dominican Summer League Brewers Blue roster
Players	Coaches/Other
Pitchers: 24 Brailin Aguirrez; 58 Jordy Brache; 60 Carlos Canales; 40 Manuel Davila; 55 Wilmer Duarte; 54 Steven Duran; -- Jefrey Etiene; 53 Carlos Galindo; 51 Deivy Gonzalez; 52 Lukas Gonzalez; 50 Merwin Manrique; 49 Alexander Mercedes; 48 Manuel Moreno; 47 Daniel Munoz; 46 Jean Rodriguez; 45 Jesus Vasquez; Catchers: 16 Sebastian Franeites; 18 Yoneiker Lugo; 20 Roniel Paulino; 21 Johanderson Tarazona; Infielders: 3 Romano Donato; 2 Diego Frontado; 9 Cristian Montilla; 6 José Rodríguez; Outfielders: 10 Nicolas Barrios; 12 Manny De Los Santos; 11 Angel Gonzalez; 13 Enrique Lovera; 5 Jesus Mancera; 15 Eryks Rivero	Manager: -- Victor Rey; Coaches: -- Jacob Banister (coach); -- Conor Baxter (hitting); -- Carlos Pimentel (pitching); -- Ludwin Tejada (bullpen); 60-day injured list: 72 Fausto Barreras; 57 Alejandro Bustamante; 7-day injured list; * On Milwaukee Brewers 40-man roster; ~ Development list; # Rehab assignment; ∞ Reserve list; ‡ Restricted list; § Suspended list; † Temporarily inactive list; Roster updated August 19, 2026; Transactions; → More rosters: MiLB • Dominican Summer League; → Milwaukee Brewers minor league players

Dominican Summer League Brewers Gold roster
Players	Coaches/Other
Pitchers: 54 Luis Aguayo; 59 Jose Arias; 57 Adrian Bello; 56 Dalvin Bodre; 55 Wandy Cabrera; 40 Noel Cepeda; -- Lonell Downs; -- Daniel Garcia; 52 Derlin Garcia; 51 Gustavo Garcia; 50 Joan Gonzalez; 49 Paul Hoff; 32 Justin Lugo; 48 Santiago Martinez; 47 Christopher Peralta; 46 Jean Rivero; 36 Ruben Saldana; 45 Raymond Sarmiento; Diego Trillo; 41 Marcos Veras; Catchers: 18 Francisco De Marchena; 20 Moises Salazar; 21 Kegnnalex Seijas; Infielders: 12 Angeni Fernandez; 7 Santiago Garcia; 9 Leanders Matos; 2 Ricki Moneys; 6 Matthew Moses; 5 Osiris Ramirez; 14 Ruben Revost; 3 Josue Rodriguez; Outfielders: 11 Carlos Done; 10 Frandy Lafond; 14 Jefer Lista; 16 Francis Sosa	Manager: -- Natanael Mejia; Coaches: -- Joan Abreu (hitting); -- Robinzon Díaz (catching); -- Gerry Salisbury (pitching); 60-day injured list: 60 Miguel Andrade; 7-day injured list; * On Milwaukee Brewers 40-man roster; ~ Development list; # Rehab assignment; ∞ Reserve list; ‡ Restricted list; § Suspended list; † Temporarily inactive list; Roster updated August 11, 2026; Transactions; → More rosters: MiLB • Dominican Summer League; → Milwaukee Brewers minor league players
