= Dominican Summer League Padres =

- Boca Chica

Minor league affiliations
- Class: Rookie
- League: Dominican Summer League
- Division: Boca Chica Baseball City

Major league affiliations
- Team: San Diego Padres

Minor league titles
- League titles (1): 2025

Team data
- Name: Padres
- Ballpark: San Diego Padres Complex
- Owner(s)/ Operator(s): San Diego Padres
- Manager: Miguel Del Castillo

The Dominican Summer League Padres or DSL Padres are a Minor League Baseball team based in the Dominican Republic. The Padres compete in the Dominican Summer League as a rookie-level affiliate of the San Diego Padres. As an independent affiliate, they have been in existence since 1997.

== History ==
The team came into existence in 1990, when they shared an affiliation with the Detroit Tigers and Boston Red Sox and were known as the DSL Tigers/Padres/Red Sox. For the 1991 season, they shared an affiliation with the California Angels and Los Angeles Dodgers and were called the DSL Angels/Dodgers/Padres. For 1992 and 1993, the team shared an affiliation with the New York Yankees and were known as the DSL Yankees/Padres. The next three seasons (1994–1996), the team shared an affiliation with the Chicago Cubs and were called the DSL Cubs/Padres.

They have been independently affiliated with the Padres since 1997.

The DSL Padres Gold won their first DSL championship in 2025.

== Roster ==
Dominican Summer League Padres Brown roster
Players		Coaches/Other
Pitchers: 7 Carlos Alvarez; 3 Gensy Aquino; 55 Randoll Cruz; 56 Oliver Franco; 32 Jeuris Guzman; 46 Edinson Hernandez; 29 Miguel Angel Ledesma; 55 Kelvin Marte; 30 Wilkins Matos; 39 Jose Montijo; 52 Cristian Navarro; 33 Wilfred Paca; 17 Alexis Parra; 26 Victor Pilar; 9 Enmanuel Polo; 14 Angel Sanchez	Catchers: 24 Alberto Enriche; 28 Andres Garza; 16 Angel Mejia; 22 Matthew Sosa; 11 Gabriel Teran; 5 Joseph Uzeta; Infielders: 53 Ariel Dilone; 10 Tom Guerrero; 15 Kaden Hernandez; 12 Yonaiker Hernandez; 1 Eliander Primera; 23 Endy Rios; Outfielders: 13 Jose Bericoto; 21 Juan Martinez; 18 Sebstian Pena; 4 Frederick Saguita; 25 Clay Winklaar	Manager: -- Diego Cedeno; Coaches: -- Nelson Cruz (pitching); -- Rogelio Del Campo (hitting); -- Duanel Jones (hitting); -- Jackson Quezada (pitching); -- Juan Rojas (bench); 7-day injured list * On San Diego Padres 40-man roster ~ Development list # Rehab assignment ∞ Reserve list ‡ Restricted list § Suspended list † Temporarily inactive list Roster updated August 26, 2025; Transactions → More rosters: MiLB • Dominican Summer League → San Diego Padres minor league players

Dominican Summer League Padres Gold roster
Players		Coaches/Other
Pitchers: 20 Miguel Alvarez; 43 Raymel Belliard; 53 Yoesmerli Beltre; 44 Jose Blanco §; 24 Daniel Burciaga; 17 Jesus Castro; 39 Marco Eluscat; 49 Josias Figuereo; 26 Edwyn Hernandez; 37 Johan Minaya; 40 Dalvi Nunez; 14 Jeronimo Palmeros; 38 Albert Perez; 34 Guillermo Romero; 46 Florangel Vasquez; 41 Jeferson Villabona	Catchers: 25 Antonio Alcala; 24 Dayquer Alfonzo; 7 Santiago Contreras; 9 Jhojan Downer §; 5 Isaac Ponce; Infielders: 22 Fabian Alcantara; 27 Abraham Bastidas; 10 Darian Castillo; 12 Deivid Coronil; 4 Jhoan De La Cruz; 8 Alexander Garcia; 1 Jason Hernandez; 27 Yorvin Morla; 11 Kevin Tamburini; 13 Eduarlin Tejeda; 1 Santiago Vargas; 3 Jose Verdugo; Outfielders: 15 Cristian Benavides; 33 Eddson Martinez; 2 Moises Valdez	Manager: Brallan Perez; Coaches: Wilfri De La Cruz (bench); Felipe Morillo (bench); Edinson Rincon (hitting); Craven Travis (pitching); 60-day injured list: -- Michel Cervantes; -- Yunny Tovar; 7-day injured list * On San Diego Padres 40-man roster ~ Development list # Rehab assignment ∞ Reserve list ‡ Restricted list § Suspended list † Temporarily inactive list Roster updated August 26, 2025; Transactions → More rosters: MiLB • Dominican Summer League → San Diego Padres minor league players
