= Dominican Summer League Athletics =

- Founded in 1989; Boca Chica

Team logo	Cap insignia

Minor league affiliations
- Class: Rookie
- League: Dominican Summer League
- Division: Boca Chica Northwest Division

Major league affiliations
- Team: Athletics

Minor league titles
- League titles (1): 1998*; *As Athletics West

Team data
- Name: Athletics
- Colors: Hunter green, gold, white
- Ballpark: Juan Marichal Complex
- Owner(s)/ Operator(s): Athletics
- Manager: Cooper Goldby

The Dominican Summer League Athletics or DSL Athletics are a Minor League Baseball team of the Dominican Summer League that began play in 1989 as a rookie-level affiliate of the Athletics. They are located in Boca Chica, Santo Domingo, Dominican Republic, and play their home games at the Juan Marichal Complex. Two DSL Athletics squads existed between 1997 and 2008—DSL Athletics East and West (1997–2002) and DSL Athletics 1 and 2 (2003–08).

== Roster ==
Dominican Summer League Athletics roster
Players		Coaches/Other
Pitchers: 45 Nathan Arends; 32 Paul Chacon; 30 Yohandri Contreras; 82 Eliazar De Los Santos; -- Diomar Gonzalez; 26 Freilyn Guzman; 54 Erick Matos; 58 Amilcar Medina; 41 Jose Parra; 17 Jose Pinto; 39 Luis Plicet; 46 Brayan Polanco; -- Yordan Rodriguez; 7 Yeferson Silva; 19 Oliver Sirotti; 22 Roberto Urdaneta; -- Raulin Ventura; 64 Alvin Veras ‡; 16 Franco Zabaleta	Catchers: 20 Ramon Landaeta; 99 Azaeel Pacheco; 10 Alejandro Pereira; Infielders: 14 Brayan Cota; 3 Reinaldo De La Cruz; 61 Samuel Gonzalez; -- Ayden Johnson; 15 Edgar Montero; 21 Jesus Superlano; Outfielders: 71 Kevin Dume; 25 Darling Fernandez; 77 Jeison Lopez; 1 Jose Ramos; 11 Sebastian Rojas	Manager: Cooper Goldby; Coaches: David Brito (pitching); Gunnar Buhner (hitting); Carlos Casimiro (infield); Radhame Perez (hitting); Jose Vicente (hitting); 7-day injured list * On Athletics 40-man roster ~ Development list # Rehab assignment ∞ Reserve list ‡ Restricted list § Suspended list † Temporarily inactive list Roster updated February 28, 2025; Transactions → More rosters: MiLB • Dominican Summer League → Athletics minor league players
