= Dominican Summer League Tigers =

Dominican Summer Tigers
- Founded in 1995

Minor league affiliations
- Class: Rookie
- League: Dominican Summer League

Major league affiliations
- Team: Detroit Tigers

Minor league titles
- League titles (0): None

Team data
- Name: Tigers
- Owner/ Operator: Detroit Tigers
- Manager: Marcos Yepez, Sandy Acevedo

The Dominican Summer League Tigers are a minor league baseball team in the Dominican Summer League (DSL) affiliated with the Detroit Tigers. The Tigers have two DSL teams, DSL Tigers 1 and DSL Tigers 2. Tigers 1 play in the South Division of the DSL while Tigers 2 play in the East Division.

== Roster ==
Dominican Summer League Tigers 1 roster
Players		Coaches/Other
Pitchers: -- Gregory Amarante; -- Branell Anderson; 56 Yorsua Balanta; 84 Oliver Castillo; 62 Reymer Chourio; 77 Randy Constanza; 27 Santiago De Freitas; 88 Francisco De Sala; 45 Anderson Diaz; 65 Jesus Febles; -- Yunior Feliz; 88 Yeifry Francoi; -- Abraham Gomez; 87 Jefrey Gonzalez; 72 Omar Gonzalez; 90 Breimy Gueson; 67 Yowander Mercedes; 86 Miguel Molina; 58 Andres Ortiz; 79 Alexander Padilla; 41 Deibi Rodriguez; -- Henderson Salas; 87 Raibel Santana; 39 Jose Uribe; 65 Luis Vasquez; 75 Luis Villamizar	Catchers: 35 Carlos Benavides; 38 Fabian Dorta; 31 Armando Lao; 48 Howard Reyes; Infielders: 40 Kendrick Hernandez; 52 Edwinyer Martinez; 18 Enny Rodriguez; 8 Oscar Tineo; Outfielders: -- Emilio Gotz; 37 Adrian Hoyte; 19 Douglas Olivo; 10 Jose Ramirez; 28 Randy Santana	Manager: -- Marcos Yepez; Coaches: -- Rafael Acosta (pitching); -- Ivan Contreras (infield); -- Francisco Martinez (hitting); -- Jackson Pass (catching); -- Darwyn Zambrano (pitching); 7-day injured list; * On Detroit Tigers 40-man roster; ~ Development list; # Rehab assignment; ∞ Reserve list; ‡ Restricted list; § Suspended list; † Temporarily inactive list; Roster updated November 3, 2026; Transactions; → More rosters: MiLB • Dominican Summer League; → Detroit Tigers minor league players

Dominican Summer League Tigers 2 roster
Players		Coaches/Other
Pitchers: 82 Marco Arcia; 60 Alexander Bertiz; 69 Jeremy Cano; 51 Luis Castillo; 49 Ericksson De Los Santos; 46 Rafael Gonzalez; 51 Alfry Hernandez; 86 Edgar Leon; 76 Alexis Marinez; 57 Carlos Martinez; 50 Abelardo Medrano; 21 Jesus Miranda; 70 Donal Montas; 74 Dariel Morillo; 77 Raimi Mueses; 81 Yeury Ramirez; 78 Albert Ramos; 89 Franyerson Reyes; 71 Sheroky Rodriguez; 84 Kevin Tejada; 61 Sammy Zarraga	Catchers: 64 Manuel Bolivar; 36 Omar Bustamente; 17 Yojan Coronel; 32 Jeiker Gudino; 34 Angel Rodriguez; 25 Roman Silgado; Infielders: 30 Sterling Bazil; 9 Edgar Lugo; 12 Wagnel Luna; 44 Andy Mata; 33 Eduardo Tusen; Outfielders: 15 Willian Berti; 83 Raylin Castillo; 24 Jonathan Moya; 43 Diego Orro; 22 Samuell Sanchez; 20 Santiago Ventura	Manager: Sandy Acevedo; Coaches: -- Angel Cruz (infield); -- Kelly Ramos (catching); -- Omar Rosario (hitting); Roberto Yil (pitching); 7-day injured list; * On Detroit Tigers 40-man roster; ~ Development list; # Rehab assignment; ∞ Reserve list; ‡ Restricted list; § Suspended list; † Temporarily inactive list; Roster updated November 2, 2026; Transactions; → More rosters: MiLB • Dominican Summer League; → Detroit Tigers minor league players
