= Dominican Summer League Braves =

- Boca Chica

Minor league affiliations
- Class: Rookie
- League: Dominican Summer League
- Division: San Pedro de Macorís

Major league affiliations
- Team: Atlanta Braves

Minor league titles
- League titles (0): None

Team data
- Name: Braves
- Ballpark: Atlanta Braves Complex
- Owner/ Operator: Atlanta Braves
- Manager: Maikol Gonzalez

The Dominican Summer League Braves or DSL Braves is a minor league baseball team in the Dominican Summer League. The team plays in the San Pedro de Macorís division and is affiliated with the Atlanta Braves.

== History ==
The team came into existence in 1989 and has been an independent Braves affiliate ever since, with only one exception. For the 1994 season, the team shared an affiliation with the Texas Rangers. From 2001 to 2005, the team split into two squads as DSL Braves 1 and DSL Braves 2, but became a unified team again for the 2006 season.

== Roster ==
Dominican Summer League Braves roster
| Players | Coaches/Other |
|---|---|
| Pitchers: 55 Hector Aguilar; 48 Wilmer Almonte; 19 Efrailin Caminero; 46 Josue Castro; 56 Jesus Cova; 63 Geowin Gomez; 57 Matthew Luna; 58 Luis Mantilla; 52 Yangel Martinez; 37 Charlis Medina; 38 Giovanni Medina; 62 Ernesto Meza; 40 Cesar Navarro; 43 Darren Pereira; 60 Yostin Pinales; 45 Martires Polanco; 49 Abraham Prado; 18 Lionel Prevosti; 61 Diego Ramirez; 50 Derek Torres; Catchers: 53 Jose Nelo; 34 Jorwin Pulido; 15 Mayobanex Rosa; Infielders: 28 Durban Arnedo; 12 Edelson Cabral; -- Angel Carmona ‡; 30 Luis Fortunato; 1 Jose Manon; 4 Yassel Pena; 27 Moises Semerite; Outfielders: 23 Sherrintley Da Costa Gomez; 2 Starlyn De La Cruz; 17 Elioberto Mondesir; 36 Elisandro Ramirez; 13 Elias Reyno; 51 Osmar Torrealba | Manager: -- Maikol Gonzalez; Coaches: -- Leonard Ferrini (hitting); -- Cameron Jones (coach); -- Leandro Mateo (coach); -- Tyler Smith (pitching); -- Samuel Taveras (pitching); -- Carlos Telemaco (hitting); 60-day injured list: -- Jonathan Hechavarria; 7-day injured list; * On Atlanta Braves 40-man roster; ~ Development list; # Rehab assignment; ∞ Reserve list; ‡ Restricted list; § Suspended list; † Temporarily inactive list; Roster updated June 19, 2026; Transactions; → More rosters: MiLB • Dominican Summer League; → Atlanta Braves minor league players |
