= Dominican Summer League Phillies =

Dominican Summer Phillies
- Founded in 1985; Santo Domingo

Team logo	Cap insignia

Minor league affiliations
- Class: Rookie
- League: Dominican Summer League
- Division: Boca Chica North

Major league affiliations
- Team: Philadelphia Phillies

Minor league titles
- League titles (2): 1999; 2022 (DSL Phillies White)
- Division titles (1): 2022 (DSL Phillies White)

Team data
- Name: Phillies
- Ballpark: Philadelphia Phillies Complex
- Owner/ Operator: Philadelphia Phillies
- Manager: Felix Castillo

The Dominican Summer Phillies are a minor league baseball team in the Dominican Summer League. The team plays in the Boca Chica North division and is affiliated with the Philadelphia Phillies.

== Roster ==
Dominican Summer League Phillies Red roster
Players	Coaches/Other
Pitchers: -- Ronaldson Estevez; 84 Enyel Garcia; 58 Maicol Lauriano; 72 Jorge Mitre; 44 Rainy Mota; 67 Rene Yrish; Catchers: 61 Nelson Prieto; Infielders: 17 Nieves Izaguirre; -- Juan Parra; Outfielders	Manager: 30 Felix Castillo; Coaches: -- César Cabral (pitching); 2 Manny Martínez (bench); -- Guillermo Matos (hitting); 7-day injured list; * On Philadelphia Phillies 40-man roster; ~ Development list; # Rehab assignment; ∞ Reserve list; ‡ Restricted list; § Suspended list; † Temporarily inactive list; Roster updated May 7, 2026; Transactions; → More rosters: MiLB • Dominican Summer League; → Philadelphia Phillies minor league players
