= César Cabral =

Dominican baseball player (born 1989)

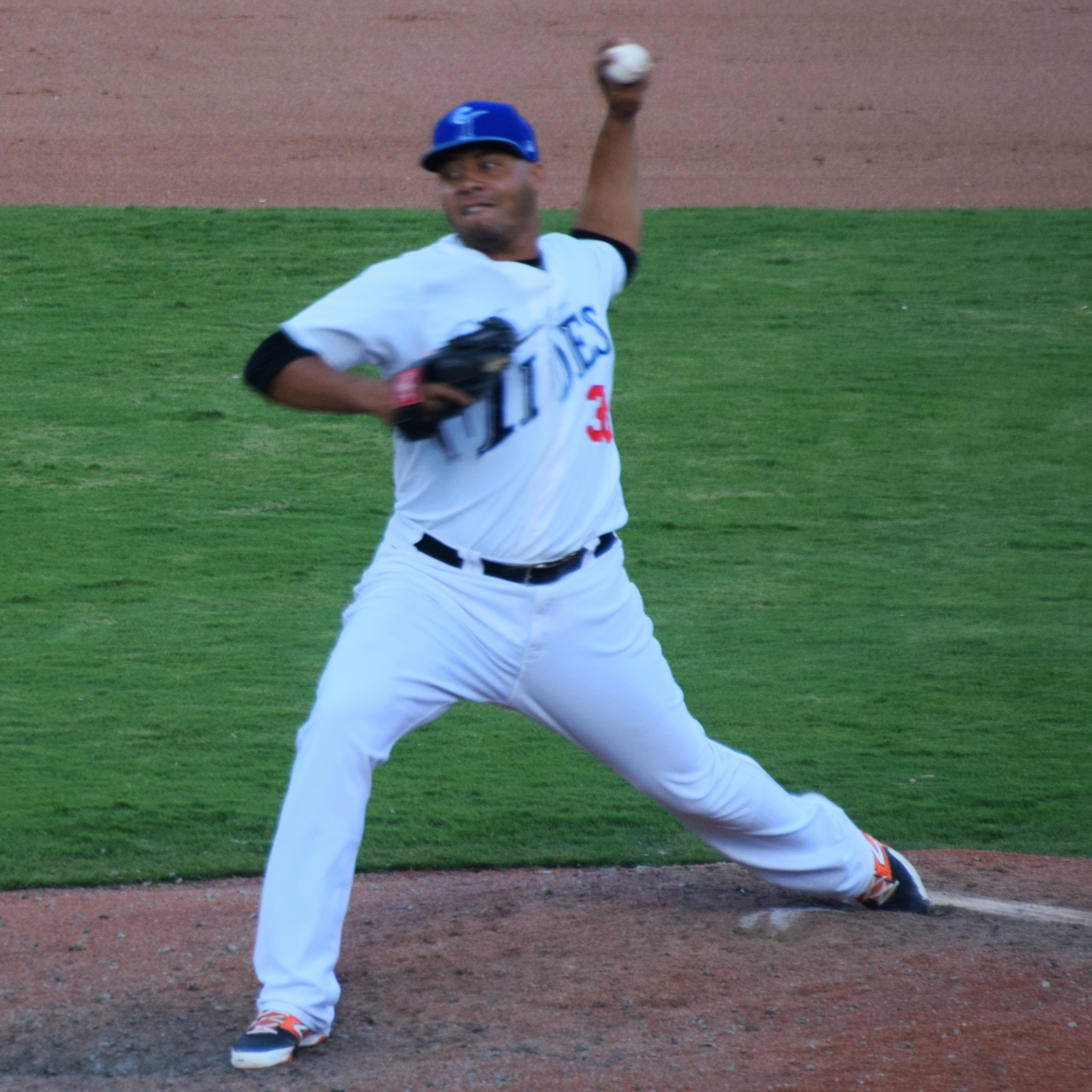
- Cabral with the Norfolk Tides in 2016
- Pitcher
- Born: February 11, 1989 (age 37); Sabana Grande de Palenque, Dominican Republic
- Batted: Left Threw: Left

MLB debut
- September 2, 2013, for the New York Yankees

Last MLB appearance
- June 7, 2015, for the Baltimore Orioles

MLB statistics
- Win–loss record: 0–0
- Earned run average: 6.35
- Strikeouts: 9
- Stats at Baseball Reference

Teams
- New York Yankees (2013–2014); Baltimore Orioles (2015)

César Augusto Cabral Dipre (born February 11, 1989) is a Dominican former professional baseball pitcher. He played in Major League Baseball (MLB) for the New York Yankees and Baltimore Orioles.

== Career ==
=== Boston Red Sox ===
Cabral was originally signed for the Boston Red Sox by scout Luis Scheker, as an international amateur free agent and played in their minor league system through 2010. His professional career began in 2006, when he went 1–4 with a 4.54 ERA and 27 strikeouts in 11 games (10 starts) with the Dominican Summer League Red Sox. In 2007, again with the DSL Red Sox, Cabral went 5–4 with a 1.76 ERA and 58 strikeouts in 14 starts. He pitched for the Gulf Coast League Red Sox in 2008, going 2–5 with a 5.59 ERA and 51 strikeouts in 11 games (9 starts), striking out 51 batters in 48 1/3 innings. In 2009, Cabral went 1–6 with a 4.03 ERA with 47 strikeouts in 15 games (9 starts) with the Low-A Lowell Spinners. He split 2010 between the Single-A Greenville Drive and High-A Salem Red Sox, posting a 4–0 record and 3.63 ERA with 9 saves in 45 relief appearances. That season, Cabral struck out 80 batters in 79 1/3 innings of work.

On December 9, 2010, Cabral was drafted by the Tampa Bay Rays in the Rule 5 Draft. He was claimed off waivers by the Toronto Blue Jays on March 12, 2011, only to be waived and re-claimed by the Rays on March 14. On March 28, Cabral was returned to Boston per Rule 5 guidelines. He split 2011 between Salem and the Double-A Portland Sea Dogs, going 3–4 with a 2.95 ERA in 36 appearances. Cabral had 70 strikeouts in 55 innings of work.

=== New York Yankees ===
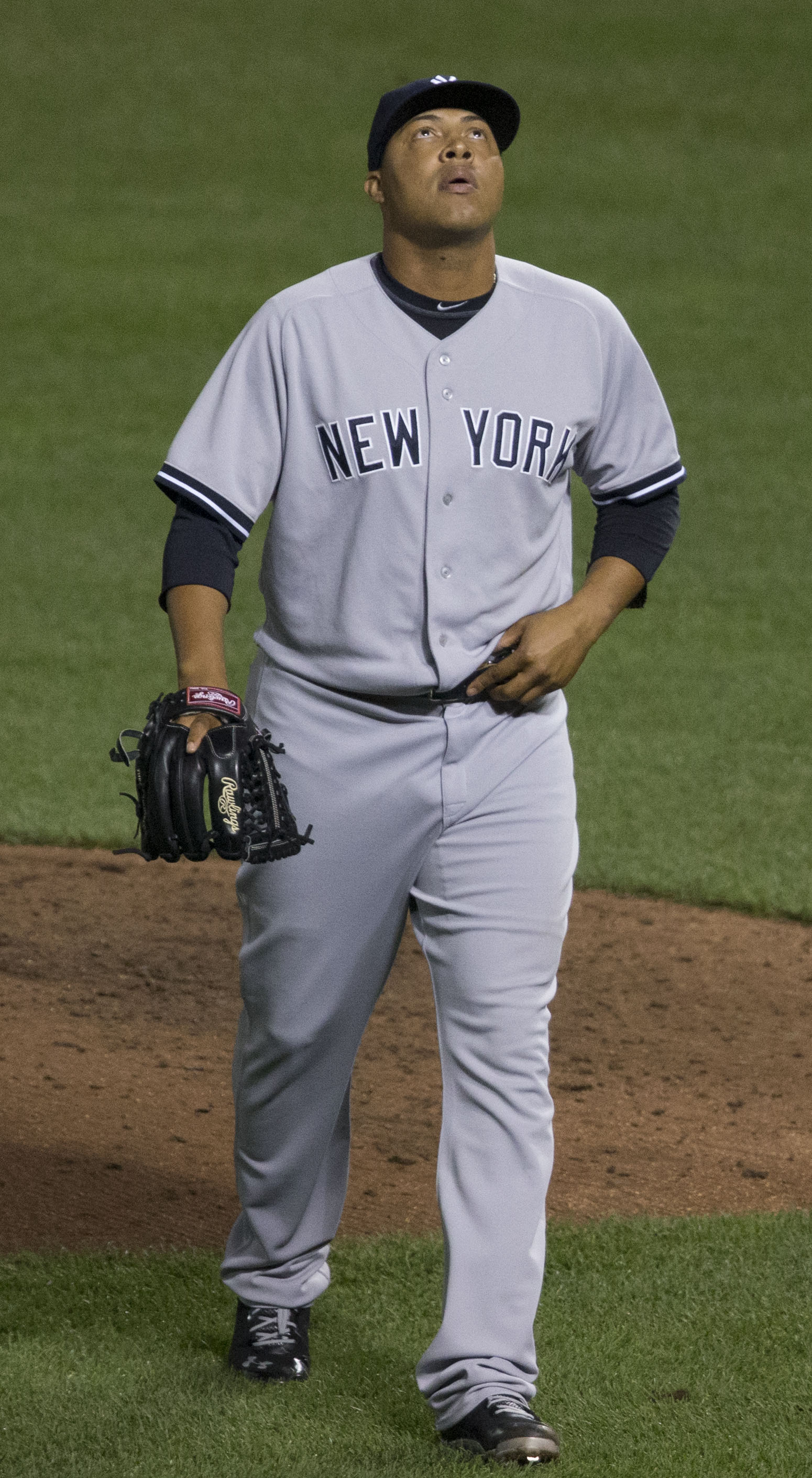
Cabral with the New York Yankees

On December 8, 2011, the Kansas City Royals selected Cabral in the Rule 5 draft, and subsequently sold him to the New York Yankees. He suffered a stress fracture in his left elbow before the 2012 season and was placed on the 60-day disabled list. On June 14, 2013, Cabral was removed from the 40-man roster and sent outright to the Triple-A Scranton/Wilkes-Barre RailRiders.

On September 1, 2013, Cabral had his contract selected to the Yankees's active roster following the roster expansion. He made his major league debut the next day against the Chicago White Sox, throwing a scoreless 8th inning while allowing a hit and striking out two.

Cabral began the 2014 season with Scranton/Wilkes-Barre. He was again called up to the Yankees on April 8, 2014, when David Robertson went on the disabled list. As a relief pitcher in a game against the Tampa Bay Rays on April 18, Cabral gave up three runs and hit three batters before being ejected from the game by the home plate umpire Joe West, despite the objections of Yankees' manager Joe Girardi. Cabral was designated for assignment on April 18, so the Yankees could promote Matt Daley. He cleared waivers and was sent outright to Scranton on April 22. On October 20, Cabral elected free agency.

=== Baltimore Orioles ===
On December 24, 2014, Cabral signed a minor league contract with the Baltimore Orioles. Through his first 16 appearances with the Double-A Bowie Baysox and Triple-A Norfolk Tides (18 innings pitched), he didn't allow an earned run. On June 5, 2015, the Orioles selected Cabral's contract, adding him to their active roster. He made two scoreless appearances for Baltimore, recording one strikeout in one inning of work. Cabral was designated for assignment on September 6, following the acquisition of Andy Wilkins. He cleared waivers and was sent outright to Norfolk the following day.

Cabral returned to Baltimore to begin the 2016 season, but struggled to a 9.72 ERA with 4 strikeouts over 8 1/3 innings of work. He was released by the Orioles organization on May 9, 2016.

=== Tokushima Indigo Socks ===
On January 18, 2017, Cabral signed a minor league contract with the Boston Red Sox. He was released prior to the start of the season in March.

On May 1, 2017, Cabral signed a contract with the Tokushima Indigo Socks of the Shikoku Island League Plus.

=== Sugar Land Skeeters ===
On April 1, 2019, Cabral was drafted by the Sugar Land Skeeters of the Atlantic League of Professional Baseball at the 2019 ALPB Player Showcase. In 12 appearances for the Skeeters, he recorded a 3.46 ERA with 6 strikeouts across 13 innings of work. Cabral was released by Sugar Land on June 28.

=== York Revolution ===
On July 5, 2019, Cabral signed with the York Revolution of the Atlantic League of Professional Baseball. In 28 appearances for York, he compiled a 2–0 record and 3.71 ERA with 20 strikeouts across 26 2/3 innings pitched. Cabral became a free agent following the season.

=== London Majors ===
On May 13, 2022, Cabral signed with the London Majors of the Intercounty Baseball League. In 5 games for London, he recorded a 1.17 ERA with 15 strikeouts across 7 2/3 innings pitched.

== Coaching Career ==
In 2026, Cabral was hired as the pitching coach of the Dominican Summer League Phillies red team the summer-league affiliate of the Philadelphia Phillies.

== See also ==
- Rule 5 draft results
