= Carlos Casimiro =

Dominican baseball player (born 1976)

- Designated hitter
- Born: November 8, 1976 (age 49); San Pedro de Macorís, Dominican Republic
- Batted: Right Threw: Right

MLB debut
- July 31, 2000, for the Baltimore Orioles

Last MLB appearance
- August 1, 2000, for the Baltimore Orioles

MLB statistics
- Games played: 2
- At bats: 8
- Hit(s): 1
- Stats at Baseball Reference

Teams
- Baltimore Orioles (2000)

Carlos Rafael Casimiro (born November 8, 1976) is a Dominican former Major League Baseball player who played with the Baltimore Orioles in 2000. In 2014, he began managing the Dominican Summer League Athletics in the Oakland Athletics system. As of 2026, he is the infield coach for the DSL Athletics.
