= Dominican Summer League Dodgers =

DSL Dodgers
- Founded in 1989; Dominican Republic

Minor league affiliations
- Class: Rookie
- League: Dominican Summer League
- Division: Boca Chica Northwest

Major league affiliations
- Team: Los Angeles Dodgers

Minor league titles
- League titles (9): 1988; 1989; 1992; 1993; 1996; 1997; 2000; 2017; 2023

Team data
- Name: DSL Dodgers
- Previous names: DSL Dodgers 1; DSL Dodgers 2; DSL Cibao Dodgers; DSL San Pedro de Macoris Dodgers
- Ballpark: Las Palmas Complex
- Owner/ Operator: Los Angeles Dodgers

The Dominican Summer Dodgers are a minor league baseball team in the Dominican Summer League. The team plays in the Boca Chica Northwest division and is affiliated with the Los Angeles Dodgers.

They have operated since 1989. Occasionally the Dodgers have fielded two teams in the DSL. In 1990, they had the DSL Cibao Dodgers and the DSL San Pedro de Macoris Dodgers and from 1992–2004 they had the DSL Dodgers 1 and DSL Dodgers 2.

== Roster ==
Dominican Summer League Dodgers Bautista roster
| Players | Coaches/Other |
|---|---|
| Pitchers: 88 David Aquino; 21 Joel Cruz; 64 Enmanuel De La Rosa; 29 Joldelanio De Los Santos; 50 Albert Feliz; 23 Luis Gamez; 6 Oliver Gonzalez; 82 Josehp Marte; 77 Michael Ramirez; 18 Shai Romero; 10 Roimer Rosas; 5 Samuel Savinon; -- Angel Tello; 60 Logan Tinkam; 56 Jose Villegas; Catchers: 44 Allen Ajoti; 75 Ezequiel Aparicio; 85 Jhon Gll; 43 Euri Rosa; Infielders: 13 Hendry Arvelo; 3 Yojackson Laya; 51 Juan Macero; 62 Daniel Mielcarek; 92 Yunior Quezada; 31 Luis Tovar; Outfielders: 78 Vicente Guaylupo; 63 Leider Padilla; 47 Jhosman Theran | Manager: Dunior Zerpa; Coaches: Antonio Bautista; Raidel Chacon (pitching); Pedro Mega (defensive); Sergio Mendez (hitting); Hector Rodriguez (pitching); 7-day injured list; * On Los Angeles Dodgers 40-man roster; ~ Development list; # Rehab assignment; ∞ Reserve list; ‡ Restricted list; § Suspended list; † Temporarily inactive list; Roster updated December 10, 2025; → More rosters: MiLB • Dominican Summer League; → Los Angeles Dodgers minor league players |

Dominican Summer League Dodgers Mega roster
| Players | Coaches/Other |
|---|---|
| Pitchers: 91 Aneudy Almonte; 35 Angel Cruz; 30 Yuliangel De La Cruz; 36 Gregg Ferrera; 48 Bryan Lara; 15 Randy Maria; 41 Franderly Morel; 33 Ivan Pacheco; 38 Axel Perez; 17 Carlos Ramirez; 45 Alexis Reyes; 37 Williams Salazar; 89 Cesar Sanchez; 84 Jose Taveras; 72 Joseph Deng Thon; Catchers: 25 Moises Rangel; 87 Jose Rivas; 40 Eduardo Rojas; Infielders: 83 Moises Acacio; 73 Harold Gonzalez; 81 Luis Luna; 90 Reyli Mariano; 61 Antoni Urena; Outfielders: 16 Agustin Acosta; 28 Jose Gonzalez; 58 Erny Orellana; 12 Rafy Peguero; 9 Jesus Villaflor | Manager: Leury Bonilla; Coaches: Roberto Giron (pitching); 60-day injured list: -- Ricardo Roman; 10 Adrian Torres; 7-day injured list; * On Los Angeles Dodgers 40-man roster; ~ Development list; # Rehab assignment; ∞ Reserve list; ‡ Restricted list; § Suspended list; † Temporarily inactive list; Roster updated November 11, 2025; → More rosters: MiLB • Dominican Summer League; → Los Angeles Dodgers minor league players |
