= Dominican Summer League =

Rookie league in Minor League Baseball

- Classification: Rookie
- Sport: Baseball
- Founded: 1985 (41 years ago)
- No. of teams: 51
- Country: Dominican Republic
- Most recent champion: DSL Padres Gold (2025)
- Most titles: DSL Dodgers (8)
- Website: www.milb.com/dominican-summer

The Dominican Summer League (DSL) is a Minor League Baseball league that operates in the Dominican Republic at the Rookie level, which is the lowest grade below Major League Baseball (MLB). The league was founded in 1985. Like the other rookie league teams, DSL teams are operated by their respective MLB franchises.

== League structure ==
The league's season usually begins in early June, with each team playing a 72-game schedule, and ends in mid-August. All 30 Major League Baseball teams have at least one team in the DSL, and many have two. Since the demise of the Venezuelan Summer League after the 2015 season, it is the only Latin America-based rookie league.

The DSL is nicknamed the "kindergarten of professional baseball", because the emphasis is on players' improvement rather than teams' win-loss record. Players are generally between the ages of 17 and 22, and many of them are recent international signings from Latin American countries. DSL players train at their teams' academies in the Dominican Republic throughout the year but only play professional games during the summer league season.

== History ==
The initial links between Major League Baseball and the Dominican Republic were informal. In 1951, the Dominican Professional Baseball League began letting MLB teams send players that they had signed or hoped to sign to play in the league, in exchange for the teams sending American coaches to the DPL. By the 1980s, more MLB players were coming from the Dominican Republic than any other country beside the United States.

In the 1980s, the Los Angeles Dodgers initiated the current academy-based structure for Dominican minor leagues in the Dominican Republic. Ralph Avila, a Dodgers staff member, noticed that many promising Dominican players failed to progress toward the major leagues because they did not have the support system in place to adapt to the demands of the professional game and the cultural differences between the U.S. and the D.R. Avila and the Dodgers designed a baseball academy to teach prospects how to be successful players on and off the field, and the other teams followed suit, leading to the modern system.

The start of the 2020 season was delayed due to the COVID-19 pandemic, with the season being cancelled entirely on 30 June. The start of the 2021 season was delayed until 12 July, with the season ultimately concluding on 2 October with no postseason. The league has since returned to its June-to-August schedule.

== Teams ==
Dominican Summer League teams (2025)
Division	Team	MLB affiliation	Stadium
Central	DSL Brewers Gold	Milwaukee Brewers	Milwaukee Brewers Baseball DR Complex, Santo Domingo
Central	DSL Cubs Blue	Chicago Cubs	Chicago Cubs Dominican Baseball Academy DR, El Toro
Central	DSL Guardians Goryl	Cleveland Guardians	Cleveland Guardians Baseball DR Complex, Santo Domingo
Central	DSL Orioles Orange	Baltimore Orioles	Baltimore Orioles DR Complex, Santo Domingo
Central	DSL Pirates Gold	Pittsburgh Pirates	Academia de Baseball de Los Piratas de Pittsburgh, El Toro
Central	DSL Rojos	Cincinnati Reds	Cincinnati Reds DR Complex, Santo Domingo
East	DSL Miami	Miami Marlins	Miami Marlins Baseball Academy DR, Boca Chica
East	DSL NYY Yankees	New York Yankees	New York Yankees DR Complex, Boca Chica
East	DSL Rangers Red	Texas Rangers	Texas Rangers Baseball Academy DR, Boca Chica
East	DSL Rockies	Colorado Rockies	Rockies of Colorado Academy DR, Boca Chica
East	DSL Tigers 2	Detroit Tigers	Detroit Tigers DR Facility, San Pedro de Macoris
East	DSL Twins	Minnesota Twins	Minnesota Twins DR Complex, Boca Chica
North	DSL Astros Orange	Houston Astros	Houston Astros DR Complex, El Toro
North	DSL Braves	Atlanta Braves	Academia de Los Bravos de Atlanta DR, San Pedro de Macoris
North	DSL Dodgers Bautista	Los Angeles Dodgers	Campo de béisbol Las Palmas de los dodgers de los Angeles DR, Santo Domingo
North	DSL Rays	Tampa Bay Rays	Academia de Baseball Tampa Bay Rays DR, Santo Domingo
North	DSL Red Sox Blue	Boston Red Sox	Boston Red Sox Baseball Academy DR, El Santo Domingo Este
North	DSL Royals Fortuna	Kansas City Royals	Kansas City Royals DR Complex, Santo Domingo
Northwest	DSL Brewers Blue	Milwaukee Brewers	Milwaukee Brewers Baseball DR Complex, Santo Domingo
Northwest	DSL Dodgers Mega	Los Angeles Dodgers	Campo de béisbol Las Palmas de los dodgers de los Angeles DR, Santo Domingo
Northwest	DSL Guardians Mendoza	Cleveland Guardians	Cleveland Guardians Baseball DR Complex, Santo Domingo
Northwest	DSL Padres Gold	San Diego Padres	Academia Padres San Diego DR, Carlos Pintos
Northwest	DSL Red Sox Red	Boston Red Sox	Boston Red Sox Baseball Academy DR, El Santo Domingo Este
Northwest	DSL Tampa Bay	Tampa Bay Rays	Academia de Baseball Tampa Bay Rays DR, Santo Domingo
South	DSL Angels	Los Angeles Angels	Los Angeles Angels of Anaheim DR Complex, Boca Chica
South	DSL Arizona Red	Arizona Diamondbacks	Arizona Diamondbacks AZPB DR, Boca Chica
South	DSL Blue Jays Red	Toronto Blue Jays	Toronto Blue Jays DR Complex, Boca Chica
South	DSL Giants Black	San Francisco Giants	San Francisco Giants DR Complex, Santo Domingo
South	DSL Mets Orange	New York Mets	New York Mets DR Complex, Boca Chica
South	DSL Nationals	Washington Nationals	Nationals Complex Dominican, Santo Domingo
South	DSL Tigers 1	Detroit Tigers	Detroit Tigers DR Facility, San Pedro de Macoris
Southeast	DSL Cardinals	St. Louis Cardinals	Academia St Louis Cardinals, Boca Chica
Southeast	DSL Colorado	Colorado Rockies	Rockies of Colorado Academy DR, Boca Chica
Southeast	DSL Marlins	Miami Marlins	Miami Marlins Baseball Academy DR, Boca Chica
Southeast	DSL Mets Blue	New York Mets	New York Mets DR Complex, Boca Chica
Southeast	DSL NYY Bombers	New York Yankees	New York Yankees DR Complex, Boca Chica
Southeast	DSL Phillies	Philadelphia Phillies	Philadelphia Phillies Baseball Academy DR, Santo Domingo
Southeast	DSL Rangers Blue	Texas Rangers	Texas Rangers Baseball DR Complex, Cayacoa
Southwest	DSL Arizona Black	Arizona Diamondbacks	Arizona Diamondbacks AZPB DR, Boca Chica
Southwest	DSL Blue Jays Blue	Toronto Blue Jays	Toronto Blue Jays DR Complex, Boca Chica
Southwest	DSL Cubs Red	Chicago Cubs	Chicago Cubs Dominican Baseball Academy DR, El Toro
Southwest	DSL Giants Orange	San Francisco Giants	Academia De Béisbol Felipe Alou, Santo Domingo
Southwest	DSL Mariners	Seattle Mariners	Academia Marinero de Seattle, Santo Domingo
Southwest	DSL Pirates Black	Pittsburgh Pirates	Academia de Baseball de Los Piratas de Pittsburgh, El Toro
Southwest	DSL White Sox	Chicago White Sox	White Sox DR Complex, Santo Domingo
West	DSL Astros Blue	Houston Astros	Houston Astros DR Complex, El Toro
West	DSL Athletics	Athletics	Academia de Béisbol de los Atléticos de Oakland, Santo Domingo
West	DSL Orioles Black	Baltimore Orioles	Baltimore Orioles DR Complex, Santo Domingo
West	DSL Padres Brown	San Diego Padres	Academia Padres San Diego DR, Carlos Pintos
West	DSL Reds	Cincinnati Reds	Cincinnati Reds DR Complex, Santo Domingo
West	DSL Royals Ventura	Kansas City Royals	Kansas City Royals DR Complex, Santo Domingo

== Champions ==
League champions have been determined by different means since the Dominican Summer League's formation in 1985. As of 2025, 16 teams—8 division winners and 8 wild card teams—qualify for the playoffs. Teams are divided into four pools of four teams each and participate in a round-robin competition called the DSL Cup. The four teams with the best record in each pool advance to the championship bracket of two rounds (semifinals and finals). All postseason series are a best-of-three format. The most recent champions (2025) are the DSL Padres Gold, one of the two DSL affiliates of the San Diego Padres.

== See also ==
- Dominican Summer League rosters
- Venezuelan Summer League
