= List of Dominican Summer League team rosters =

Below are the full rosters and coaching staff of the 51 teams of Minor League Baseball's Dominican Summer League.

== Central Division ==
Dominican Summer League Brewers Gold roster
Players	Coaches/Other
Pitchers: 45 Jose Arias; 46 Wandy Cabrera; 43 Carlos Canales; 60 Daniel Garcia; 57 Derlin Garcia; 49 Gustavo Garcia; 51 Paul Hoff; 52 Linbel Jimenez; 6 Chang Tzu-Chun Lin; 54 Christopher Peralta; 56 Ruben Saldana; 58 Raymond Sarmiento; 32 Albert Vargas; Catchers: 10 Isais Chavez; 39 Roniel Paulino; Infielders: 7 Cristopher Acosta; 12 Romano Donato; 16 Cristian Montilla; 18 Matthew Moses; -- Ruben Revost; Outfielders: 21 Nicolas Barrios; 23 Eryks Rivero; 25 Francis Sosa	Manager: -- Natanael Mejia; Coaches: -- Joan Abreu (hitting); -- Gerry Salisbury (pitching); 7-day injured list; * On Milwaukee Brewers 40-man roster; ~ Development list; # Rehab assignment; ∞ Reserve list; ‡ Restricted list; § Suspended list; † Temporarily inactive list; Roster updated April 29, 2026; Transactions; → More rosters: MiLB • Dominican Summer League; → Milwaukee Brewers minor league players

Dominican Summer League Cubs Blue roster
Players	Coaches/Other
Pitchers: 82 Jider Corpas; 66 Frankelly Desis; 50 Yusef Hanania; 61 Erick Hernandez; -- Luis Martinez; 79 Amilkar Romero; 60 Fleury Soriano; 80 Geovanny Villarroel; Catchers: 37 Victor Garcia; Infielders: 44 Julio Acosta; 34 Ronnyel Espinoza; -- Johan Geraldo; 7 Juan Monso; 8 Luis Santos; Outfielders: 17 Josias Ramirez; 27 Luis Sanchez	Manager: -- Enrique Wilson; Coaches: -- Raymond Pena (hitting); -- Jovanny Rosario (baserunning/outfield and first base); -- Jordal Williams (pitching); 7-day injured list; * On Chicago Cubs 40-man roster; ~ Development list; # Rehab assignment; ∞ Reserve list; ‡ Restricted list; § Suspended list; † Temporarily inactive list; Roster updated May 12, 2026; Transactions; → More rosters: MiLB • Dominican Summer League; → Chicago Cubs minor league players

Dominican Summer League Guardians Goryl roster
Players	Coaches/Other
Pitchers: 38 Enderson Amaya; 29 Wilinyer Ardiles; 48 Ronny Arias; 35 Randy Baron; -- Antony Carela; -- Jesus Colmenarez; 49 Luis Dorante; 39 Rey Feliz; 23 Daniel Gentile; 52 Jonaikel Meza; 30 Abrahan Milan; 47 Josh Perez; 41 Johander Rivero; -- Wilfi Rodriguez; 46 Rodarni Salvador; 54 Amilcar Teran; 58 Juan Yan; Catchers: 2 Wuinder Torres; 8 Santiago Ustariz; Infielders: 15 Israel Alvarez; 4 Heins Brito; 24 Sebastian De Los Santos; 9 José Marcano; -- Svert Reinoso; Outfielders: 16 Freilyn Rodriguez; 1 Osmar Torrealba	Manager Coaches: -- Carlos Fermin (bench); -- Jonathan Lozada (hitting); -- Cristobal Rodriguez (coach); 7-day injured list; * On Cleveland Guardians 40-man roster; ~ Development list; # Rehab assignment; ∞ Reserve list; ‡ Restricted list; § Suspended list; † Temporarily inactive list; Roster updated May 2, 2026; Transactions; → More rosters: MiLB • Dominican Summer League; → Cleveland Guardians minor league players

Dominican Summer League Orioles Orange roster
Players	Coaches/Other
Pitchers: -- Xavier Alvero ‡; 84 David De Los Santos; 81 Alexander Diaz; 89 Ronal Herrera; -- Andri Hidalgo; -- Roniel Joseph; 98 Julio Ozoria; 44 Luis Perdomo; 68 Anderson Reyes; 38 Deimer Rodriguez; 58 Joismer Sandoval; 94 Laurens Sosa; 97 Samuel Teran; 51 Benjamin Vasquez; 76 Carlos Virla; 64 Kelvin Zapata; Catchers: 1 Yeison Acosta; 36 Victor Saez; Infielders: -- Jose Luis Acevedo; 24 Meykel Baro; 11 Jorge Drullard; 13 Frandy Guillen; Outfielders: 27 Fabian Cordero; 30 Johanse Gomez; 31 Rayner Herrera; 40 Breiny Ramírez	Manager: -- Chris Madera; Coaches: -- Ramon Lub (fundamentals); 7-day injured list; * On Baltimore Orioles 40-man roster; ~ Development list; # Rehab assignment; ∞ Reserve list; ‡ Restricted list; § Suspended list; † Temporarily inactive list; Roster updated May 11, 2026; → More rosters: MiLB • Dominican Summer League; → Baltimore Orioles minor league players

Dominican Summer League Pirates Gold roster
Players	Coaches/Other
Pitchers: 59 Mauricio De La Cruz; 48 Tony Gonzalez; 61 Yoslaniel Hernandez; 79 Carlos Lorenzo §; 91 Dariel Miguel; 94 Roilan Portuondo; 64 Marlon Quintana; 67 Darwin Roa; 60 Alejandro Rondon; 97 Jose Sequera; Catchers: 14 Jesus Lizardo; Infielders: 35 Frankeli Mesta; 38 Armstrong Muhoozi §; 23 Antonio Pimentel; Outfielders: 25 Iverson Allen	Manager: -- Joel Fuentes; Coaches }: -- Jose Cueto (pitching); -- Billy Hong (coach); -- Leo Perez (bench); -- Gustavo Polanco (catching); -- Kaden Shapiro (development); -- Raul Siri (hitting); 60-day injured list: 70 Keuri Almonte (full season); 7-day injured list; * On Pittsburgh Pirates 40-man roster; ~ Development list; # Rehab assignment; ∞ Reserve list; ‡ Restricted list; § Suspended list; † Temporarily inactive list; Roster updated April 24, 2026; Transactions; → More rosters: MiLB • Dominican Summer League; → Pittsburgh Pirates minor league players

Dominican Summer League Reds roster
Players	Coaches/Other
Pitchers: 58 Anthony Aquino; 43 Luis Avila; 36 Guillermo Baldelomar; 25 Ramses Camargo; 51 Luisangel Chirino; -- Keury De Jesus; 30 Ariel De La Cruz; 44 Ysaias Escalona; 34 Deivi Garcia; 50 Malvin Garcia; 46 Cesar Maiz; 16 Manuel Marchan; -- Franyer Mendez; -- Jose Navarrete; 60 Nicola Prodanovic; 31 Jonathan Santana; -- Anderson Venero; 55 Luis Yepes; Catchers: 40 Qyshawn Legito; Infielders: 4 Jealmy Frias; 6 Omar Guadamuz; 45 Shendrion Martinus; 9 Riangelo Richardson; 3 Nayerich Waterfort; Outfielders: 26 Jaset Martinez; -- Angel Nuñez; 22 Jose Sabino	Manager: -- Jose Montilla; Coaches: -- Aaron Bond (defensive); -- Takashi Miyoshi (defensive); -- Luis Terrero (hitting); 7-day injured list; * On Cincinnati Reds 40-man roster; ~ Development list; # Rehab assignment; ∞ Reserve list; ‡ Restricted list; § Suspended list; † Temporarily inactive list; Roster updated May 15, 2026; Transactions; → More rosters: MiLB • Dominican Summer League; → Cincinnati Reds minor league players

== East Division ==
Dominican Summer League Miami roster
Players	Coaches/Other
Pitchers: -- Luis Acevedo; -- Oswaldo Aponte; 62 Ricardo Arredondo; 32 Keyner Cedeno; 48 Fernando De La Rosa; -- Luis Espinoza; -- Carlos Ochoa; 31 Adrian Pena; -- Yanixan Resendiz; 47 Maikel Rodriguez; -- Stiveen Rojas; Catchers: -- Carlos Martinez; 26 Moises Morales; 24 Alexander Requena; 22 Kevin Robledo; Infielders: 12 Johan Machado; -- Ronny Muñoz; 25 Wanderlin Padilla; 18 Sandy Presbot; Outfielders: 33 Samuel Estevez; 15 Osvaldo Heredia; 14 Jesus Perez	Manager: -- Oscar Escobar; Coaches: -- Arquimedes Cumana (coach); -- Ramon Espinosa (defensive); -- Yohan Pino (pitching); 7-day injured list; * On Miami Marlins 40-man roster; ~ Development list; # Rehab assignment; ∞ Reserve list; ‡ Restricted list; § Suspended list; † Temporarily inactive list; Roster updated May 16, 2026; Transactions; → More rosters: MiLB • Dominican Summer League; → Miami Marlins minor league players

Dominican Summer League NYY Yankees roster
Players	Coaches/Other
Pitchers: -- Manuel Aguilar; 42 Sebastian Castillo; -- Dariel Chalas; 25 Jhosneyker Colina; 17 Carlos Hampshire; 30 Luis Ilarraza; -- Freddy Lopez; 50 Hector Moreno; 11 Fredy Penuelas; 23 Luis Rodriguez; -- Dalvin Taveras; 15 Emanuel Vargas; 28 Jose Vargas; -- Oscar Vasquez; 54 Varis Villarreal; Catchers: 5 Edgar Jimenez; 67 Jose Lavagnino; -- Stalen Ramirez; Infielders: 39 Carlos Bello; 22 Mani Cedeno; 31 Adrian Feliz; 8 Emmanuel Orozco; Outfielders: 44 Eliezer Adames; 21 Isaias Castillo; 12 Alfiery Matos	Manager: -- Carlos Vidal; Coaches: -- Nelson B. Alvarez (hitting); -- Juan Crisp (defensive); -- Edwar Ramirez (pitching); 7-day injured list; * On New York Yankees 40-man roster; ~ Development list; # Rehab assignment; ∞ Reserve list; ‡ Restricted list; § Suspended list; † Temporarily inactive list; Roster updated May 18, 2026; Transactions; → More rosters: MiLB • Dominican Summer League; → New York Yankees minor league players

Dominican Summer League Rangers Red roster
Players	Coaches/Other
Pitchers: -- Jostin Alcantara; -- Jeyson Bautista; 51 Frederik Dolsi; 9 Jefferson Encarnacion; 15 Christopher Hernandez; 41 Jesus Lopez; 30 Eddy Peralta; 52 Daniel Ramos; 26 Yadiel Roquez; Catchers: -- Frainker Benitez; -- Jesus Flores; 18 Jose Marcano; -- Santiago Ramirez; Infielders: 12 Yeisy Celesten; -- David Diaz; -- Darling Montero; -- David Ortiz Jr.; 1 Jayln Pinder; 11 Fabelin Volquez; Outfielders: 16 Joaquin Arias Jr.; 25 Wesly Castillo; -- Luis Cedeno; -- Breyner Figuereo; 3 Jhostin Genao; 32 Oliver Guerrero; 46 Manni Ramirez; -- Victor Rodriguez; 39 Saivel Zayas	Manager: 37 Esteban Cordoza; Coaches: -- Alexis Infante (bench); -- Matt Rabe (pitching); -- Wilton Veras (hitting); 60-day injured list: -- Jose Alvarado; -- Jason Alvarez; -- Victor Lopez; -- Santiago Rivas; 7-day injured list; * On Texas Rangers 40-man roster; ~ Development list; # Rehab assignment; ∞ Reserve list; ‡ Restricted list; § Suspended list; † Temporarily inactive list; Roster updated May 22, 2026; → More rosters: MiLB • Dominican Summer League; → Texas Rangers minor league players

Dominican Summer League Rockies roster
Players	Coaches/Other
Pitchers: 56 Lenixon Armas; 22 Luis Centeno; 62 Ronaldo Florencio; -- Mario Garcia; 61 Josue Henrique; 70 Kevin Martinez; 28 Gleiderson Mendoza; 55 Netali Pinales; 67 Roberto Salas; 77 Antony Ventura; 57 Eric Veras ‡; Catchers Infielders: -- Richard De Los Santos; 47 Daniel Meza; -- Darling Pena; -- Larry Suero; Outfielders: -- Leudy Arache; 8 Wandi Feliz; 52 Carlos Mota; 80 Omar Munoz	Manager: -- Mauricio Gonzalez; Coaches: -- Samuel Deduno (pitching); -- Felix Rosario (hitting); 7-day injured list; * On Colorado Rockies 40-man roster; ~ Development list; # Rehab assignment; ∞ Reserve list; ‡ Restricted list; § Suspended list; † Temporarily inactive list; Roster updated May 18, 2026; Transactions; → More rosters: MiLB • Dominican Summer League; → Colorado Rockies minor league players

Dominican Summer League Tigers 2 roster
Players	Coaches/Other
Pitchers: 51 Luis Castillo; 62 Reymer Chourio; 43 Jhonan Coba; 77 Randy Constanza; 74 Aleiman Cruz; 57 Carlos Martinez; 67 Yowander Mercedes; 70 Donal Montas; 85 Victor Palmero; 78 Albert Ramos; 89 Franyerson Reyes; 61 Carlos Rodriguez; 41 Deibi Rodriguez; -- Jose Uribe; -- Sammy Zarraga; Catchers: 35 Carlos Benavides; -- Yojan Coronel; 34 Angel Rodriguez; Infielders: 30 Sterling Bazil; 9 Edgar Lugo; 44 Andy Mata; -- Leandy Mella; 18 Enny Rodriguez; Outfielders: 37 Adrian Hoyte; 24 Jonathan Moya; 10 Jose Ramirez; 8 Cris Rodriguez	Manager: -- Sandy Acevedo; Coaches: -- Williams Moreno (pitching); -- Soilo Perdomo (infield); -- Roberto Yil (pitching); 7-day injured list; * On Detroit Tigers 40-man roster; ~ Development list; # Rehab assignment; ∞ Reserve list; ‡ Restricted list; § Suspended list; † Temporarily inactive list; Roster updated May 14, 2026; Transactions; → More rosters: MiLB • Dominican Summer League; → Detroit Tigers minor league players

Dominican Summer League Twins roster
Players	Coaches/Other
Pitchers: 39 Agustin Campusano; -- Jhordy Ciriaco; 48 Manuel Compres; 74 Jesus Gomez; -- Fernando Hernandez; 30 Eliezer Lucena; -- Juan Marquez; -- Luis Martinez; -- Miguel Martinez; 60 Rey Pacheco; 21 Juan Quinones; -- Alam Soriano; 19 Eli Urena; Catchers: 52 Aaron Salazar; Infielders: -- Yosangel Braffit; Outfielders	Manager: 38 Rafael Martinez; Coaches: -- Gabriel Garcia (pitching); -- Ozney Guillen (hitting); -- Ruben Santana (infield); -- Zach Simmons (hitting); -- Alex Wright (pitching); 7-day injured list; * On Minnesota Twins 40-man roster; ~ Development list; # Rehab assignment; ∞ Reserve list; ‡ Restricted list; § Suspended list; † Temporarily inactive list; Roster updated May 11, 2026; Transactions; → More rosters: MiLB • Dominican Summer League; → Minnesota Twins minor league players

== North Division ==
Dominican Summer League Astros Orange roster
Players	Coaches/Other
Pitchers: 59 Anderson Aguilar; 39 Dayerson Cova; 41 Ronald De Los Santos; 23 Antonio Delgado; -- Anthony Gantes; 46 Ricardo Heredia; 17 Victor Jiminez; 9 Cristhopher Mejias; 43 Antonio Morales; 23 Leonel Murrieta; 35 Emilio Payro; 59 Luis Reyes; 37 Gabriel Rivero; -- Mauricio Rodriguez; 38 Reidy Rosario; 57 Kevin Santana; Catchers: 77 Esteban Castro; 15 Emilio Gonzalez ‡; Infielders: 7 Samuel Brito; 4 Christian Colon; 2 Pablo Martinez; 3 Franchely Silverio; Outfielders: 31 Yensi De La Cruz; 22 Edwilmin Matos; 44 Anthony Millan; 26 Eduardo Perez; 28 Freddy Ramos	Manager: -- Carlos Canelon; Coaches: -- Selin Aquino (coach); -- Jervic Chavez (pitching); -- Brauly Mejia (hitting); -- Orlando Merced (hitting); 7-day injured list; * On Houston Astros 40-man roster; ~ Development list; # Rehab assignment; ∞ Reserve list; ‡ Restricted list; § Suspended list; † Temporarily inactive list; Roster updated March 5, 2026; Transactions; → More rosters: MiLB • Dominican Summer League; → Houston Astros minor league players

Dominican Summer League Braves roster
Players	Coaches/Other
Pitchers: -- Wilmer Almonte; -- Jesus Cova; 40 Victor Duarte; 49 Yangel Martinez; 56 Ernesto Meza; -- Yostin Pinales; 18 Lionel Prevosti; Catchers Infielders: 60 Angel Carmona; 4 Yassel Garcia; Outfielders: 34 Elisandro Ramirez; 28 Elias Reyno	Manager: -- Maikol Gonzalez; Coaches: -- Leonard Ferrini (hitting); -- Cameron Jones (coach); -- Leandro Mateo (coach); -- Tyler Smith (pitching); -- Samuel Taveras (pitching); -- Carlos Telemaco (hitting); 7-day injured list; * On Atlanta Braves 40-man roster; ~ Development list; # Rehab assignment; ∞ Reserve list; ‡ Restricted list; § Suspended list; † Temporarily inactive list; Roster updated April 6, 2026; Transactions; → More rosters: MiLB • Dominican Summer League; → Atlanta Braves minor league players

Dominican Summer League Dodgers Bautista roster
Players	Coaches/Other
Pitchers: 88 David Aquino; -- Delio Centeno; 64 Enmanuel De La Rosa; 29 Joldelanio De Los Santos; 50 Albert Feliz; -- Diego Paez; 18 Shai Romero; 10 Roimer Rosas; 60 Logan Tinkam; -- Victor Tovar; -- Eliecer Zambrano; Catchers: 44 Allen Ajoti; 75 Ezequiel Aparicio; -- Oliver Chapman; 43 Euri Rosa; Infielders: 13 Hendry Arvelo; -- Adrian Del Cid; 3 Yojackson Laya; 51 Juan Macero; 92 Yunior Quezada; 31 Luis Tovar; Outfielders: -- Fran-Jean Haseth; -- Helvin Mendoza; 63 Leider Padilla; -- Jeibert Rondon; 47 Jhosman Theran	Manager: Sergio Mendez; Coaches: Roger Caraballo (assistant hitting); Raidel Chacon (pitching); Alex De Jesus (hitting); Victor Sosa (hitting); Hector Rodriguez (pitching); 7-day injured list; * On Los Angeles Dodgers 40-man roster; ~ Development list; # Rehab assignment; ∞ Reserve list; ‡ Restricted list; § Suspended list; † Temporarily inactive list; Roster updated May 21, 2026; → More rosters: MiLB • Dominican Summer League; → Los Angeles Dodgers minor league players

Dominican Summer League Rays roster
Players	Coaches/Other
Pitchers: 34 Omar Arredondo; -- Andersson Barbosa; 30 Ismael Cabral; 37 Daniel Castro; 44 Ransel Cruz; 35 Jensey Duran; 39 Ricardo Guzman; 28 Alexander Lopez; 40 Ezequiel Martinez; 36 Gabriel Paez; 22 Diego Palacios; 18 Sebastian Perez; 45 Ricardo Ramirez; -- Raibel Reyes; 27 Diego Soriano; 33 Francis Valdez; Catchers: 17 Bladimir Figueredo; 11 Santiago Figueroa; 8 Santiago Mendoza; 2 Brainerh Palacios; 24 Ivan Torres; Infielders: 1 Eliomar Garces; 5 Raymer Medina; -- Franklin Merisu; 14 Carlos Salazar; 10 Warel Solano; -- Victor Valdez; Outfielders: 9 Kadil Rubio; 23 Emile Torres	Manager: -- Albert Lantigua; Coaches: -- Edgar Alfonzo (assistant pitching); -- Eleardo Cabrera (hitting); -- Erick Epifano (infield); -- Jiminson Natera (hitting); -- Luis Urena (pitching); 7-day injured list; * On Tampa Bay Rays 40-man roster; ~ Development list; # Rehab assignment; ∞ Reserve list; ‡ Restricted list; § Suspended list; † Temporarily inactive list; Roster updated April 11, 2026; Transactions; → More rosters: MiLB • Dominican Summer League; → Tampa Bay Rays minor league players

Dominican Summer League Red Sox Blue roster
Players	Coaches/Other
Pitchers: 38 Jainer Almanza; 13 Wascar Berroa; 57 Ranci Castillo; 29 Erickson Ettien; 41 Carlos Falcon; 58 Alexander Heredia; 71 Angel Lopez; -- Jesus Lopez; 51 Michael Manjarres; 54 Dani Richar; 31 Oscar Vaamonde; 68 Yariel Valdez; -- Ranfi Vargas; Catchers: 59 Lester Suarez; 55 Andruw Zambrano; Infielders: 35 Eliezer Alfonzo; 12 Diomar Hidalgo; Outfielders: 18 Stiven De La Cruz; 64 Enmanuel Figuereo; 36 Maikol Tovar	Manager: -- Sandy Madera; Coaches: -- Bryan Delgado (pitching); -- Juan Hernandez (hitting); -- Wade Satzinger (hitting); -- Carlos Vallejo (coach); -- Matt Wheeler (pitching); 7-day injured list; * On Boston Red Sox 40-man roster; ~ Development list; # Rehab assignment; ∞ Reserve list; ‡ Restricted list; § Suspended list; † Temporarily inactive list; Roster updated May 2, 2026; Transactions; → More rosters: MiLB • Dominican Summer League; → Boston Red Sox minor league players

Dominican Summer League Royals Fortuna roster
Players	Coaches/Other
Pitchers: 51 Alving Campusano; 36 Samuel Carmona; 70 Argenis Done; -- Luis Garces; 44 Angel Garcia; 35 Jesus Garcia; 32 Jordin Jhonni; 64 Nomar Jimenez; 61 Carlos Luces; 17 Jose Mejia; 37 Ricardo Montilla; 68 Melvin Robles; 43 Javier Rojas; -- Adrian Rumardo; -- Andy Sanchez; 80 Junior Suarez; Catchers: -- Alberto Aguilar; -- Marcos Hernandez; 41 Anthony Longo; 25 Emmanuel Martinez; 6 Richer Mata; Infielders: -- Leandro Briceno; 49 Angelmis De La Cruz; 67 Juan Garcia; -- Luis Gutierrez; 11 Luis Steven King; 24 Jesus Ortega; 0 Marwin Rivero; Outfielders: 59 Robinson Chacon; -- Angeibel Gomez; 44 Alejandro Guerrero; -- Enmanuel Santos ‡	Manager: -- Ramon Martinez; Coaches: -- Irving Falu (bench); -- Ariel Venegas (first base); -- Jose Veras (pitching); 7-day injured list; * On Kansas City Royals 40-man roster; ~ Development list; # Rehab assignment; ∞ Reserve list; ‡ Restricted list; § Suspended list; † Temporarily inactive list; Roster updated May 20, 2026; Transactions; → More rosters: MiLB • Dominican Summer League; → Kansas City Royals minor league players

== Northwest Division ==
Dominican Summer League Brewers Blue roster
Players	Coaches/Other
Pitchers: -- Luis Aguayo; 24 Brailin Aguirrez; 72 Fausto Barreras; -- Dalvin Bodre; 40 Lonell Downs; 41 Steven Duran; 43 Carlos Galindo; 45 Lukas Gonzalez; 46 Justin Lugo; 48 Merwin Manrique; 53 Santiago Martinez; 37 Manuel Moreno; -- Hansel Rincon; 33 Jean Rodriguez; Catchers: -- Francisco De Marchena; 26 Yoneiker Lugo; 51 Kegnnalex Seijas; 38 Johanderson Tarazona; Infielders: -- Diego Frontado; -- Santiago Garcia; 64 Leonard Rijo; Outfielders: 67 Carlos Done; 68 Angel Gonzalez; 70 Frandy Lafond; 71 Jefer Lista; 22 Gerlyn Payano	Manager: -- Victor Rey; Coaches: -- Jacob Banister (coach); -- Conor Baxter (hitting); -- Robinzon Díaz (coach); -- Carlos Pimentel (pitching); 7-day injured list; * On Milwaukee Brewers 40-man roster; ~ Development list; # Rehab assignment; ∞ Reserve list; ‡ Restricted list; § Suspended list; † Temporarily inactive list; Roster updated May 2, 2026; Transactions; → More rosters: MiLB • Dominican Summer League; → Milwaukee Brewers minor league players

Dominican Summer League Dodgers Mega roster
Players	Coaches/Other
Pitchers: -- Tom Apfelbaum; 36 Gregg Ferrera; 48 Bryan Lara; 15 Randy Maria; 33 Ivan Pacheco; -- Alexander Pichardo; 17 Carlos Ramirez; 45 Alexis Reyes; -- Angel Rodriguez; -- Ricardo Roman; 84 Jose Taveras; 72 Joseph Deng Thon; Catchers: 25 Moises Rangel; 87 Jose Rivas; Infielders: 83 Moises Acacio; 81 Luis Luna; 61 Antoni Urena; Outfielders: 58 Erny Orellana; 12 Rafy Peguero; 9 Jesus Villaflor	Manager: Leury Bonilla; Coaches: Jesus Canizales (pitching); Wladimir Chaló (bench); Roberto Giron (pitching); Jose Rodulfo (pitching); Andre Ruche (hitting); Ryan Whithorn (defensive); 7-day injured list; * On Los Angeles Dodgers 40-man roster; ~ Development list; # Rehab assignment; ∞ Reserve list; ‡ Restricted list; § Suspended list; † Temporarily inactive list; Roster updated May 24, 2026; → More rosters: MiLB • Dominican Summer League; → Los Angeles Dodgers minor league players

Dominican Summer League Guardians Mendoza roster
Players	Coaches/Other
Pitchers: -- Jose Cedeno; 34 Handrychson Colina; -- Angel Cordova; 33 Victor De Jesús; 35 Yoshtner Farfan; 38 Daiher Hernandez; 24 Jhordari Jiminez; 45 Carlos Lopez; 30 Oscar Melgarejo; 44 Antwan Montana; 47 Abraham Negrin; 41 Erick Padilla; -- Javier Pedreanez; -- Julio J Rossi; -- Julio M Rossi; 36 Carlos Sanchez; 27 Erich Tovar; 60 Raul Trujillo; 61 Delni Uribe; 48 Eriberto Vasquez; Catchers: 1 Robert Alvarez; 2 Pablo Arosemena; 4 Hiverson Lopez; Infielders: 7 Daniel Arias; 8 Luis Galan; 10 Luis Garcia; 12 Jose Riera; 17 Jefferson Vargas; 22 Nomar Velasquez; Outfielders: 23 Marcos Belen ‡; 11 Carlos Caripa; 28 Romer Taveras	Manager Coaches: -- Justin Devoid (hitting); -- Jose Rincon (coach); -- Jesús Tavárez (bench); -- Carlos Yan (pitching); 7-day injured list; * On Cleveland Guardians 40-man roster; ~ Development list; # Rehab assignment; ∞ Reserve list; ‡ Restricted list; § Suspended list; † Temporarily inactive list; Roster updated May 14, 2026; Transactions; → More rosters: MiLB • Dominican Summer League; → Cleveland Guardians minor league players

Dominican Summer League Padres Gold roster
Players	Coaches/Other
Pitchers: 20 Miguel Alvarez; 43 Raymel Belliard; 44 Jose Blanco; 24 Daniel Burciaga; -- Michel Cervantes; -- Julio Dilone; 39 Marco Eluscat; 49 Josias Figuereo; -- Joel Gonzalez; 26 Edwyn Hernandez; 38 Albert Perez; -- Albieris Polanco; -- Rickelby Ramos; 34 Guillermo Romero; -- Rafael Torres; Catchers: 25 Antonio Alcala; 24 Dayquer Alfonzo; Infielders: 27 Abraham Bastidas; 10 Darian Castillo; 12 Deivid Coronil; -- Joniel Hernandez; 27 Yorvin Morla; Outfielders: 15 Cristian Benavides; 33 Eddson Martinez	Manager Coaches: -- Wilfri De La Cruz (bench); -- Felipe Morillo (bench); -- Edinson Rincon (hitting); -- Craven Travis (pitching); 7-day injured list; * On San Diego Padres 40-man roster; ~ Development list; # Rehab assignment; ∞ Reserve list; ‡ Restricted list; § Suspended list; † Temporarily inactive list; Roster updated April 30, 2026; Transactions; → More rosters: MiLB • Dominican Summer League; → San Diego Padres minor league players

Dominican Summer League Red Sox Red roster
Players	Coaches/Other
Pitchers: 40 Jose Alexandro; 66 Isael Fis; 51 Allan Griman; -- Emanuel Jiminez; -- Radinsson Lopez; 60 Jesus Martinez; 31 Robert Moreno; 37 Leosmar Perez; 55 Eddison Septimo; 30 Charlie Zink; Catchers: 51 Kevin Morillo; Infielders: 2 Luis Aular; -- Dawvris Brito; 3 Miguel Welch; Outfielders: 24 Gustavo Antunez; 58 Geomaikel Martinez; 44 Jhonny Osta; 11 Krishan Ulacio; 28 Adrian Valdez	Manager: -- Amaury Garcia; Coaches: -- Rafael Feliz (pitching); -- William Flanders (coach); -- Edwin Rodriguez (hitting); -- Claudio Sanchez (coach); -- Leonel Vasquez (bullpen); 7-day injured list; * On Boston Red Sox 40-man roster; ~ Development list; # Rehab assignment; ∞ Reserve list; ‡ Restricted list; § Suspended list; † Temporarily inactive list; Roster updated April 30, 2026; Transactions; → More rosters: MiLB • Dominican Summer League; → Boston Red Sox minor league players

Dominican Summer League Tampa Bay roster
Players	Coaches/Other
Pitchers: 17 Anderson Alvarez; 27 Jhonny Aranguren; -- Luis Bautista ‡; 30 Diego Castro; 24 Frank Chessman; 29 Jhendry Ciriaco; -- Roberto Mendoza; 50 Yosniel Menendez; 38 Jose Menes; 28 Yolvin Mesa; -- Angel Perez; 38 Yonaiker Perez; 25 Sebastian Pina; 37 Ralph Sierra; -- Justin Suero; 26 Isaac Vegas; Catchers: 9 Carlos De Sousa; 21 Samuel Pardo; Infielders: -- Jeison Araujo; -- Fabricio Blanco; 13 Aaron Pinero; -- Erison Rojas; Outfielders: 7 Maykol Coret; 11 Carlos Matias	Manager: -- Henry Lugo; Coaches: -- Yomelbin Almonte (assistant pitching); -- Wilmer Dominguez (catching); -- Jose Sanchez (pitching); 7-day injured list; * On Tampa Bay Rays 40-man roster; ~ Development list; # Rehab assignment; ∞ Reserve list; ‡ Restricted list; § Suspended list; † Temporarily inactive list; Roster updated May 15, 2026; Transactions; → More rosters: MiLB • Dominican Summer League; → Tampa Bay Rays minor league players

== South Division ==
Dominican Summer League Angels roster
Players	Coaches/Other
Pitchers: 43 Wilmer Berroteran; 35 Jhostin Betances; 38 Steven Cabrera; 60 Sebastian Caseres; -- Anllelo Gutierrez; 41 Freddy Hernandez; 64 Juan Jordan; 39 Kauriel Leon; 32 Miguel Liendo; 40 Albert Morel; 65 Starling Reyes; 45 Javier Rodriguez; 59 Fabian Soto; 49 Felix Tapia; Catchers: 67 Jose Camacho; 48 Josue Demey; 16 Diego Rondon; Infielders: 22 Luis Bruno; -- Jeyson Horton; 12 Liordanys Martinez; 9 Cesar Paredes; 37 Jose Santana; Outfielders: 33 Yelinson Betances; 14 Junior Suriel	Manager: -- Héctor de la Cruz; Coaches: -- Anel De Los Santos (hitting); -- Enrique González (pitching); -- Jose Marte (pitching); -- Berbani Martinez (defensive); -- Danilo Sanchez (catching); 7-day injured list; * On Los Angeles Angels 40-man roster; ~ Development list; # Rehab assignment; ∞ Reserve list; ‡ Restricted list; § Suspended list; † Temporarily inactive list; Roster updated April 29, 2026; Transactions; → More rosters: MiLB • Dominican Summer League; → Los Angeles Angels minor league players

Dominican Summer League Arizona Red roster
Players	Coaches/Other
Pitchers: -- Deyvi Almonte; 33 Samuel Bello; 27 Johan Calcano; 25 Luis Carrasco; 34 Jhossua Castro; 32 Luis Cepeda; -- Gustavo De La Cruz; 30 Berlin Fransua; -- Alfredo Guzman; 22 Yaury Jimenez; 26 Geremias Pena; 29 Jose Puello; -- Heriberto Ron; 37 Gregory Sanchez; -- Samuel Santos; Catchers: 13 Johan Fernandez; 12 Robert Lantigua; Infielders: 11 Alfredo Guanchez; 2 Angel Suarez; Outfielders: 4 Andy Encarnacion; 8 Raily Liriano; -- D-Shawn Martina; -- Jose Requena	Manager: -- Izzy Alcantara; Coaches: -- Manuel Ramirez (hitting); -- Samuel Rivas (assistant); -- Manuel Soliman (pitching); 7-day injured list; * On Arizona Diamondbacks 40-man roster; ~ Development list; # Rehab assignment; ∞ Reserve list; ‡ Restricted list; § Suspended list; † Temporarily inactive list; Roster updated May 15, 2026; Transactions; → More rosters: MiLB • Dominican Summer League; → Arizona Diamondbacks minor league players

Dominican Summer League Giants Black roster
Players	Coaches/Other
Pitchers: 23 Lender Bracho; 54 Luis Custodio ‡; 10 Jose De La Rosa; 49 Rainiel Duran; -- Fernando Estrella; -- Alberto Gomez; 56 Mario Gonzalez; -- Santiago Guerrero; 52 Delvis Heredia; 53 Jeremiah Jones; 39 Jhon Leon; 26 Jesus Lopez; 48 Frainer Mejias; 51 Alfonso Perez; 45 Josue Perez; 31 Carlos Toro; Catchers: 21 Diego Alambarrio; 32 Alessandro Duran; -- Fernando Pena; Infielders: 17 Yoxander Benitez; 6 Keiberg Camacaro; 33 Albert Jimenez; 19 Yeison Oviedo; 7 Dennys Riera; 16 Anthony Tandron; Outfielders: 5 Ricardo Crespo; 12 Vinicius Dos Santos	Manager: -- Juan Ciriaco; Coaches: -- Crisford Adames (fundamentals); -- Jon Erhard (hitting); -- Osiris Matos (pitching); -- Hector Ortiz (fundamentals); 7-day injured list; * On San Francisco Giants 40-man roster; ~ Development list; # Rehab assignment; ∞ Reserve list; ‡ Restricted list; § Suspended list; † Temporarily inactive list; Roster updated May 11, 2026; Transactions; → More rosters: MiLB • Dominican Summer League; → San Francisco Giants minor league players

Dominican Summer League Mets Orange roster
Players	Coaches/Other
Pitchers: -- Olmedo Barria; 38 Osiris Calvo; 48 Alvaro Carrillo; 66 Kleber Gamez; -- Maxgregori Harvey; 51 Henderson Hernandez; 39 Abner Meza; 56 Jhony Osoria; 49 Anderson Ozuna; 15 Darling Perez; 23 Christopher Rochin; -- Derlin Rojas; 23 Arturo Sevilla; -- Arnaldo Tejada; Catchers: -- Jose Serracin; Infielders: -- Wandy Asigen; 54 Roni Garcia; 27 Georwill Rodriguez; 13 Yorber Semprun; Outfielders: 65 Aiberson Blanco; -- Anthony Delgado	Manager: -- Felix Fermin Jr.; Coaches: -- Miguel Alfonseca (pitching); -- Jose Mena (hitting); 7-day injured list; * On New York Mets 40-man roster; ~ Development list; # Rehab assignment; ∞ Reserve list; ‡ Restricted list; § Suspended list; † Temporarily inactive list; Roster updated May 11, 2026; Transactions; → More rosters: MiLB • Dominican Summer League; → New York Mets minor league players

Dominican Summer League Nationals roster
Players	Coaches/Other
Pitchers: 37 Enmanuel Carela; 36 Jesus Carrasco; 18 Julio Chivilli; 43 Greyson Gimenez; 39 Anyel Manzueta; 47 Jousuet Martinez; 52 Hernan Mejia; 30 Angel Pena; -- Franniel Reynoso; 48 Manuel Ruiz; 46 Jhondel Salas; 33 Jose Sanchez; 21 Ranger Sarit; -- Jhoan Thomas; Catchers: 10 Junior Castillo; Infielders: 8 Rony Bello; 13 Eddy Marmolejos; 22 Angel Requena; 44 Adrian Tusen; 4 Esnaider Vargas; Outfielders: 15 Andry Araujo; 3 Jonierbis Garces; -- Samil Serrano	Manager: -- Sandy Martinez; Coaches: -- Jeremy Bautista (catching); -- Brenny Escanio (defensive); -- Blaise Martinez (complex pitching); -- Niomar Gomez (assistant pitching); -- Freddy Guzmán (assistant hitting); -- Rafael Ozuna (hitting); -- Feliberto Sanchez (pitching); 7-day injured list; * On Washington Nationals 40-man roster; ~ Development list; # Rehab assignment; ∞ Reserve list; ‡ Restricted list; § Suspended list; † Temporarily inactive list; Roster updated March 22, 2026; Transactions; → More rosters: MiLB • Dominican Summer League; → Washington Nationals minor league players

Dominican Summer League Tigers 1 roster
Players	Coaches/Other
Pitchers: 82 Marco Arcia; 56 Yorsua Balanta; 69 Jeremy Cano; 84 Oliver Castillo; 49 Ericksson De Los Santos; 88 Francisco De Sala; 45 Anderson Diaz; -- Jefrey Gonzalez; 52 Frenny Grant; 81 Alexis Marinez; 50 Abelardo Medrano; 86 Miguel Molina; 56 Andres Ortiz; 71 Sheroky Rodriguez; 65 Luis Vasquez; -- Luis Villamizar; Catchers: 36 Omar Bustamente; 38 Fabian Dorta; 32 Jeiker Gudino; 31 Armando Lao; 29 Steven Madero; 19 Howard Reyes; 28 Martin Tamara; Infielders: 20 Angel De Los Santos; 40 Kendrick Hernandez; 12 Wagnel Luna; 7 Jhonger Ochoa; Outfielders: 15 Willian Berti; 25 Cristian Perez; 13 Santiago Pinto; 4 Angel Roso; 22 Samuell Sanchez; -- Randy Santana	Manager: -- Marcos Yepez; Coaches: -- Rafael Acosta (pitching); -- Ivan Contreras (infield); -- Kelly Ramos (catching); -- Omar Rosario (hitting); -- Darwyn Zambrano (assistant); 60-day injured list: 27 Guillermo Batista; 7-day injured list; * On Detroit Tigers 40-man roster; ~ Development list; # Rehab assignment; ∞ Reserve list; ‡ Restricted list; § Suspended list; † Temporarily inactive list; Roster updated May 9, 2026; Transactions; → More rosters: MiLB • Dominican Summer League; → Detroit Tigers minor league players

== Southeast Division ==
Dominican Summer League Cardinals roster
Players	Coaches/Other
Pitchers: 44 Efrén Álvarez; 29 Hendrick Caña; -- Leonil De Leon; 28 Ricardo Fernández; 41 Juan García; 16 Daniel Gómez; -- Javier Martínez; 51 Domingo Mejía; 52 Kriscol Peralta; 26 Briam Reyes ‡; 32 Ryan Rodríguez; -- Juan Santillán; Catchers: 59 Héctor Cabrera; 55 Jhonny Chaparro; -- Sebastian Rojas; Infielders: -- Diego Conseción; 48 Michael Cordero; 8 Jesús Pérez; 15 Yeferson Portolatin; 36 Beiker Rodríguez; 56 Christian Sáez; Outfielders: 35 Brayan Amoroso; -- Saúl Figuereo; -- Emanuel Luna; -- Misael Sánchez; 53 Lucas Takahashi	Manager: 11 Fray Peniche; Coaches: -- Paul Benoit (assistant); 87 Wesslye Cuas (hitting); 89 Wilman Madera (pitching); -- Luis Reynoso (hitting); -- Kelvyn Rodriguez (assistant); 54 Bill Villanueva (pitching); 7-day injured list; * On St. Louis Cardinals 40-man roster; ~ Development list; # Rehab assignment; ∞ Reserve list; ‡ Restricted list; § Suspended list; † Temporarily inactive list; Roster updated April 14, 2026; Transactions; → More rosters: MiLB • Dominican Summer League; → St. Louis Cardinals minor league players

Dominican Summer League Colorado roster
Players	Coaches/Other
Pitchers: 15 Cristopher Alburquerque; 18 Diego Arroyo; -- Felix Bello; 21 Victor Castellano; 74 Onofer De La Cruz; 73 Oby Escalante; 26 Maximo Gonzalez; 29 Pedro Nunez; 31 Edwin Pena; 58 Oscar Pujols; -- Rafael Quezada; -- Yadiel Ramon; 36 Brian Tiburcio; 37 Melky Ventura; -- Juan Villamizar; Catchers: 9 Abraham Elvira; 12 Bryan Rodriguez; Infielders: 1 Danny Cancro; 3 Rosniell De Paula; -- Jendry Guaraco; Outfielders: -- Hector Barroso; 51 Ishel Comenencia; 7 Luis Morejon	Manager: -- Eugenio Jose; Coaches: -- Johendi Jiminian (pitching); -- Florentino Nunez (hitting); 7-day injured list; * On Colorado Rockies 40-man roster; ~ Development list; # Rehab assignment; ∞ Reserve list; ‡ Restricted list; § Suspended list; † Temporarily inactive list; Roster updated May 13, 2026; Transactions; → More rosters: MiLB • Dominican Summer League; → Colorado Rockies minor league players

Dominican Summer League Marlins roster
Players	Coaches/Other
Pitchers: -- Diego Bohorquez; 30 Edelson Canelon; 26 Alejandro De La Cruz; -- Ronelbi Garcia; 30 Abraham Hernandez; 32 Santiago Linares; 33 Adriano Marrero; -- Franklin Mejia; 53 Bayant Melo; 13 Albert Ortiz; 49 Luis Porfirio; 31 Isaac Prince; Catchers: -- Diego Martinez; Infielders: 12 Anthony Abreu; -- Gregori Arias; -- Angel Brachi; 2 Diwarys Encarnacion; 7 Cesar Garcia; 10 Steven Herrera; 57 Rendy Naveo; 48 David Shirley; -- Santiago Solarte; Outfielders	Manager: -- Carlos Mota; Coaches: -- Miguel Fermin (catching); -- César Jiménez (pitching); -- Emilio Linares (hitting); 7-day injured list; * On Miami Marlins 40-man roster; ~ Development list; # Rehab assignment; ∞ Reserve list; ‡ Restricted list; § Suspended list; † Temporarily inactive list; Roster updated May 2, 2026; Transactions; → More rosters: MiLB • Dominican Summer League; → Miami Marlins minor league players

Dominican Summer League Mets Blue roster
Players	Coaches/Other
Pitchers: 59 Greison Acosta; 55 Aurelvys Batista; -- Cristopher Del Orbe; 63 Jose Gomez; 34 Wilmer Lugo; 23 Angel Montero; 62 Danny Portel; 29 Leyvi Rodriguez; -- Yordan Rodriguez; -- Gensil Rosario; 45 Yobanny Sanchez; 53 Maykol Vasquez; 66 Jose Vielma; Catchers: 26 Cesar Acosta; 22 Jesus Griman; 25 Adrian Silva; Infielders: 2 Cristopher Larez; 4 Jose Padilla; 54 Giomar Ubiera; Outfielders: 1 Alex Acosta; 3 Jhonael Cuello; -- Jonnhan Sanchez	Manager: -- JC Rodriguez; Coaches: -- Dan Cataline (hitting); -- Juan Martinez (pitching); 7-day injured list; * On New York Mets 40-man roster; ~ Development list; # Rehab assignment; ∞ Reserve list; ‡ Restricted list; § Suspended list; † Temporarily inactive list; Roster updated May 1, 2026; Transactions; → More rosters: MiLB • Dominican Summer League; → New York Mets minor league players

Dominican Summer League NYY Bombers roster
Players	Coaches/Other
Pitchers: 59 Ranciel Abreu; 39 Cesar Acosta; 40 Randy Angomas; 41 Andre Avila; 61 Lenin Caceres; 45 Diego Carrillo; -- Jhon Castro; 47 Kevin Centeno; 48 Chaury Gomez; 58 Alexis Hernandez; -- Felipe Hampshire; -- Yunior Jerez; 53 Josue Silvestre; 60 Junior Tavera; 43 Ronald Tejada; -- Mauricio Vargas; 55 Christopher Vasquez; Catchers: 64 Jesus Guerrero; 29 Jose Peralta; 62 Alessandro Rodriguez; Infielders: 31 Alfred Ciriaco; 24 Stiven Martinez; 11 Christofer Reyes; -- Dariel Santano; 27 Juan Torres; Outfielders: 14 David Carrera; 18 Ruben Castillo; 25 Eddinson Charles; 12 Richard Meran	Manager Coaches: -- Freicer Perez (pitching); -- Selwyn Langaigne (hitting); -- Eduardo Navas (defensive); 7-day injured list; * On New York Yankees 40-man roster; ~ Development list; # Rehab assignment; ∞ Reserve list; ‡ Restricted list; § Suspended list; † Temporarily inactive list; Roster updated May 14, 2026; Transactions; → More rosters: MiLB • Dominican Summer League; → New York Yankees minor league players

Dominican Summer League Phillies Red roster
Players	Coaches/Other
Pitchers: -- Ronaldson Estevez; 84 Enyel Garcia; 58 Maicol Lauriano; 72 Jorge Mitre; 44 Rainy Mota; 67 Rene Yrish; Catchers: 61 Nelson Prieto; Infielders: 17 Nieves Izaguirre; -- Juan Parra; Outfielders	Manager: 30 Felix Castillo; Coaches: -- César Cabral (pitching); 2 Manny Martínez (bench); -- Guillermo Matos (hitting); 7-day injured list; * On Philadelphia Phillies 40-man roster; ~ Development list; # Rehab assignment; ∞ Reserve list; ‡ Restricted list; § Suspended list; † Temporarily inactive list; Roster updated May 7, 2026; Transactions; → More rosters: MiLB • Dominican Summer League; → Philadelphia Phillies minor league players

Dominican Summer League Rangers Blue roster
Players	Coaches/Other
Pitchers: 31 Albert Cordero; 45 Yunier De Jesus; 43 Ayverson Echenique; -- Harley Fernandez; -- Jehiber Fernandez; 18 Enmanuel Figuereo; 13 Manuel Gomez; 49 Nestor Gonzalez; 29 Alex Lamu; 22 Edgar Liriano; 15 Ruben Medina; 28 Brian Morban; 53 Dariel Pena; -- Juan Perez; 54 Aneudy Santos; -- Jose Silvestre; Catchers: 40 Abel Valdes; Infielders: -- Felix Colina; -- Francisco Coronado; -- Victor Gonzalez; 9 Raul Pereira; -- Elian Rosario; 27 Fraimy Santa; -- Cristian Seminiel; 12 Jhon Simon; Outfielders: 19 Rosnel Alarcon; -- Braulio Cavero; 33 Alex Rodriguez	Manager Coaches: -- Jesus Ovalles (bench); -- Marty Pitts (hitting); 7-day injured list; * On Texas Rangers 40-man roster; ~ Development list; # Rehab assignment; ∞ Reserve list; ‡ Restricted list; § Suspended list; † Temporarily inactive list; Roster updated May 20, 2026; → More rosters: MiLB • Dominican Summer League; → Texas Rangers minor league players

== Southwest Division ==
Dominican Summer League Arizona Black roster
Players	Coaches/Other
Pitchers: 25 Francis Aquino; -- Jose Belisario; 31 Neiker Palacios; 22 Stiven Rogers; -- Gregory Sipion; 34 Robert Terrero; 32 Miguel Valdez; 26 Miguel Vargas; 21 Keivan Vasquez; Catchers: 13 Santiago Gil; 15 Ismael Mejia; 19 Jeshua Mendez; 16 Jose Rodriguez; Infielders: 7 Juan Brima; 6 Alam Bruno; 11 Felix Genao; 1 Rodrigo Gonzalez; 10 Daonil Montero; Outfielders: 8 Elian De La Cruz; 9 Mayki De La Rosa; 12 Albert Medina; 3 Jose Pitre; 4 Belfi Rivera; 17 Ronny Suarez	Manager: -- Vladimir Frias; Coaches: -- Luis Alen (coach); -- Rafael Guerrero (hitting); -- Chuy Mendoza (pitching); -- Danny Salazar (pitching); 7-day injured list; * On Arizona Diamondbacks 40-man roster; ~ Development list; # Rehab assignment; ∞ Reserve list; ‡ Restricted list; § Suspended list; † Temporarily inactive list; Roster updated May 16, 2026; Transactions; → More rosters: MiLB • Dominican Summer League; → Arizona Diamondbacks minor league players

Dominican Summer League Blue Jays Blue roster
Players	Coaches/Other
Pitchers: 23 Jose Andrades; 17 Geremy Barroso; 30 Gabriel Brito; 36 Gabriel Castro; 29 Cesar Cerezo; 15 Enyer Dominguez; 35 Cristhian Duarte; 7 Edwin Francisco; 61 Jorge Gonzalez; -- Tomoya Kinjo; 6 Ire Martinez; -- Kenyer Navarro; 32 Carlos Olivo; 13 Juan Ramirez; 32 Rodrigo Ramirez; 45 Manuel Suero; 20 Alexander Valiente; 24 Edrwin Veras; -- Angel Ynfante; Catchers: 8 Esmeiquel Arrieche; 26 Carlos Garcia; Infielders: 11 Darwin Nunez; 2 Cristopher Polanco; 22 Juarlin Soto; Outfielders: 14 Daniel Dominguez; 9 Fabian Gonzalez; 34 Elian Reyes	Manager: -- Ashley Ponce; Coaches: -- Jose Ferrer (bench); -- Ramon Marte (assistant pitching); -- Jose Mateo (coach); -- Ricardo Nanita (hitting); -- Victor Ramos (pitching); 7-day injured list; * On Toronto Blue Jays 40-man roster; ~ Development list; # Rehab assignment; ∞ Reserve list; ‡ Restricted list; § Suspended list; † Temporarily inactive list; Roster updated May 18, 2026; Transactions; → More rosters: MiLB • Dominican Summer League; → Toronto Blue Jays minor league players

Dominican Summer League Cubs Red roster
Players	Coaches/Other
Pitchers: 52 Carlos Barrientos; 74 Salvador Burgos; -- Luis Diaz; 95 Anthony Feliz; -- Tadeo Gamez; 65 Angel Gonzalez; 70 Bryan Landaez; 54 Sebastian Lopez; -- Dylan Lozada; -- Rafael Merchan; 45 Wilfran Ortega; -- Naikys Piedra; -- Yamel Pinto; 55 Carlos Rangel; 72 Anderson Rivera; Catchers: 40 Diego Gonzalez; Infielders: 20 Elerick Gomez; -- Jaims Martinez; Outfielders: 22 Freiker Betencourt; 21 Luis Leon	Manager: -- Carlos Ramirez; Coaches: -- Osvaldo Aquino (pitching); -- Jhonny Bethencourt (hitting); -- Andrws Cruz (assistant); 7-day injured list; * On Chicago Cubs 40-man roster; ~ Development list; # Rehab assignment; ∞ Reserve list; ‡ Restricted list; § Suspended list; † Temporarily inactive list; Roster updated May 12, 2026; Transactions; → More rosters: MiLB • Dominican Summer League; → Chicago Cubs minor league players

Dominican Summer League Giants Orange roster
Players	Coaches/Other
Pitchers: 32 Brayan Cabello; 39 Kendry Castro; 88 Simon Colmenares; 52 Randry De Leon; 53 Winkel Del Rosario; 54 Hector Dos Santos; 63 Jose D. Gonzalez; 31 Luis Hernandez; 37 Ebduar Loina; 34 Jose Meza; 58 Iverson Paulino; -- Oscar Ramirez; 45 Edwin Reynoso; -- Gerson Rivero ‡; -- Maicol Santana; 40 Jose Trevizo; 46 Abraham Utrera; 38 Elkyns Villarreal; Catchers: -- Luis Padron; Infielders: -- Israel Alfonse; 29 Omar Calcurian; 35 Alexander Camacaro; 47 Juan Colorado; 7 Jeyson Moya; 2 Boris Sarduy; 8 Franco Willias; Outfielders: 26 Rainer Espinoza; 6 Djean Macares; -- Jose Valdez; 23 Brandon Vasquez; 12 Diego Villegas	Manager: -- Ian MacDonald; Coaches: -- Juan Parra (hitting); -- Darwin Peguero (pitching); -- Francisco Rodriguez (fundamentals); 7-day injured list; * On San Francisco Giants 40-man roster; ~ Development list; # Rehab assignment; ∞ Reserve list; ‡ Restricted list; § Suspended list; † Temporarily inactive list; Roster updated May 14, 2026; Transactions; → More rosters: MiLB • Dominican Summer League; → San Francisco Giants minor league players

Dominican Summer League Mariners roster
Players	Coaches/Other
Pitchers: 23 Henry Alcantara; -- German Arvayo; 21 Kleiver Benitez; 30 Cesar Farias; -- Gabriel Hidalgo; 29 Wisler Infante; 18 Anderson Jimenez; 35 Erick Lanza; -- Carlos Martinez; 37 Danery Meyer; 33 Randal Munoz; 15 Ismanuel Piña; 52 Kevin Pino; 9 Osvaldo Platas; 14 Christopher Quiroz; 20 Darwin Ramos; -- Jesus Rondon †; 31 Mathias Sato; -- Adan Vallenilla; Catchers: 17 Manuel Baez; 41 Gabriel Guanchez; -- Santiago Pereira; Infielders: 13 Dawel Joseph; 5 Kendry Martinez; Outfielders: -- Fabian Gonzalez; 19 Elias Perez; -- Juan Rijo; 16 Maikol Rodriguez; -- Edgardo Toro	Manager: -- Luis Matias; Coaches: -- Jose Amancio (pitching); -- Jesus Galindo (outfield/base running); -- Guadalupe Jabalera (bench); -- Angus Stayte (hitting); 7-day injured list; * On Seattle Mariners 40-man roster; ~ Development list; # Rehab assignment; ∞ Reserve list; ‡ Restricted list; § Suspended list; † Temporarily inactive list; Roster updated May 7, 2026; Transactions; → More rosters: MiLB • Dominican Summer League; → Seattle Mariners minor league players

Dominican Summer League Pirates Black roster
Players	Coaches/Other
Pitchers: 58 Welin Aponte; -- Yorgenson Artigas; 81 Fernando Figuera; 78 Dariel Florentino; 75 Justino Francisco; 86 Angel Herrera; -- Darlin Mejia; 83 Leudy Reyes; 68 Maickol Reyes; 50 Angel Rosado; 73 Hamlet Santos; 74 Robinson Smith; 57 Yhosneiber Torres; 51 Albert Vega; Catchers: -- Luis Almeida; -- Oscar Borges; 37 Yadier Crespo; 43 Victor Familia; 12 Victor Marquez; Infielders: -- Freilyn Rodriguez; 28 Yoander Santana; Outfielders: 2 Luis Cruz; 34 Limanol Payero; 29 Hanley Ramirez	Manager: -- Ken Matsuzaka; Coaches: -- Yendry Manzanillo (pitching); -- Justin Miknis (development); -- Luis Perez (hitting); -- Khelyn Smith (hitting); -- Angel Suero (coach); 7-day injured list; * On Pittsburgh Pirates 40-man roster; ~ Development list; # Rehab assignment; ∞ Reserve list; ‡ Restricted list; § Suspended list; † Temporarily inactive list; Roster updated May 7, 2026; Transactions; → More rosters: MiLB • Dominican Summer League; → Pittsburgh Pirates minor league players

Dominican Summer League White Sox roster
Players	Coaches/Other
Pitchers: -- Jhoriel De La Rosa; -- Alexander De Los Santos; 45 Juan Felix; 43 Oriel Fortuna; -- Ronald Kelly; 40 Albert Munoz; 46 Hansel Pinales; 41 Yoneiber Rodriguez; 33 Natanael Valerio; Catchers: -- Fernando Graterol; 15 Diego Natera; Infielders: -- Samuel Luis; 27 Hector Paulino; Outfielders: 13 Orlando Patino; -- Sebastian Romero	Manager: -- Wellington Morrobel; -- Anthony Nunez; Coaches: -- Fran Bautista (performance); -- Carlos Chavez (pitching); -- Carlos Javier (performance); -- Moises Nunez (hitting); -- Stolmy Pimentel (assistant pitching); -- Guillermo Reyes (infield); -- J.C. Sapper (pitching); -- Rigoberto Silverio (development); 7-day injured list; * On Chicago White Sox 40-man roster; ~ Development list; # Rehab assignment; ∞ Reserve list; ‡ Restricted list; § Suspended list; † Temporarily inactive list; Roster updated May 1, 2026; Transactions; → More rosters: MiLB • Dominican Summer League; → Chicago White Sox minor league players

== West Division ==
Dominican Summer League Astros Blue roster
Players	Coaches/Other
Pitchers: -- Angel Alcantara; 8 Nick Borquez; -- Angel Brito; 45 Omar Damian; -- Allen Garcia; 22 Alex Gonzalez; -- Robier Hernandez; -- Kelvin Herrera; -- Joel Jiminez; -- Juan Martinez; 73 Nomar Meza; -- Carlos Montes ‡; -- Ender Nunez; -- William Perez; -- Cesar Pastrano; -- Darwin Rosario ‡; 57 Jorman Santana; 26 Jesus Sosa; -- Thomas Sveyda; -- Samil Valdivieso; Catchers: -- Jeans Carrizalez; 37 Ire Garcia; -- Alexander Huerta; 12 Alexi Quiroz; -- Jesus Teran; Infielders: 36 Jose De La Cruz; -- Albert Fermín; 3 Sami Manzueta; 47 Santiago Martinez; 18 Eric Mota; Outfielders: -- Imanol Feliz; -- Brayan Mendez; 21 Amauri Ramirez; -- Rainier Rivas; 14 Esteban Romero; -- Carlos Sandoval	Manager: -- Johe Acosta; Coaches: -- Rick Aponte (pitching); -- Humberto Miranda (development); -- Angel Tejeda (hitting); 7-day injured list; * On Houston Astros 40-man roster; ~ Development list; # Rehab assignment; ∞ Reserve list; ‡ Restricted list; § Suspended list; † Temporarily inactive list; Roster updated May 14, 2026; Transactions; → More rosters: MiLB • Dominican Summer League; → Houston Astros minor league players

Dominican Summer League Athletics roster
Players	Coaches/Other
Pitchers: 45 Nathan Arends; 20 Jhose Brea; 29 Yerlin Burgos; 6 Jesus Delgado; 12 Edwin Mendoza; 49 Ricardo Osorio; 39 Luis Plicet; 21 Ricardo Reyes; 75 Yordan Rodriguez; 2 Oliver Sirotti; -- Alvin Veras; 84 Angel Vizcaino; Catchers: 23 Aiverson Barazarte; 99 Azaeel Pacheco; Infielders: -- Johenssy Colome; 14 Brayan Cota; 5 Luis Cuevas; 13 Yorvit Diaz; 4 Ayden Johnson; -- Pedro Pineda; Outfielders: 25 Darwing Ozuna; 11 Sebastian Rojas; 47 Carlos Salmeron	Manager: -- Wilkin Castillo; Coaches: -- David Brito (pitching); -- Carlos Casimiro (infield); -- Pedro Figueroa (pitching); -- Manny Garcia (coach); -- Kevin Riggs (hitting); -- Alex Valdez (hitting); -- Jose Vicente (hitting); 7-day injured list; * On Athletics 40-man roster; ~ Development list; # Rehab assignment; ∞ Reserve list; ‡ Restricted list; § Suspended list; † Temporarily inactive list; Roster updated May 5, 2026; Transactions; → More rosters: MiLB • Dominican Summer League; → Athletics minor league players

Dominican Summer League Orioles Black roster
Players	Coaches/Other
Pitchers: 43 Luis Andujar; 66 Alberto Arias; 49 Asael Arias; 75 Edgar Benitez; 83 Roynel Confidente; 48 Angel De Jesus; 86 Esteban Dicent; 87 Juan Duran; -- Enyel Garcia; -- Roberto Geraldo; -- Maicol Lauriano; 71 Jainer Marmolejos; 19 David Medina; 65 Junior Medina; 0 Emmanuel Pena; -- Axel Perez; 28 Waner Perez; -- Marcos Reynoso; -- Scarling Sterling; 96 Henry Tejada; 99 Darling Valencio; 53 Yunior Villavicencio; Catchers: 16 Ricardo Chirinos; 23 Jose Flores; 18 Manuel Vasquez; Infielders: 72 Frainner Chirinos; -- Maicor Degollado; -- Roberto Gabot; 9 Ronald Terrero; Outfielders: 39 Anthwan Brea; -- Wanel Celestin; 35 Alexander Rincon; 37 Argenis Valdez	Manager: -- Elvis Morel; Coaches: -- George Bell (hitting); -- Dionis Pascual (pitching); 7-day injured list; * On Baltimore Orioles 40-man roster; ~ Development list; # Rehab assignment; ∞ Reserve list; ‡ Restricted list; § Suspended list; † Temporarily inactive list; Roster updated May 15, 2026; → More rosters: MiLB • Dominican Summer League; → Baltimore Orioles minor league players

Dominican Summer League Padres Brown roster
Players	Coaches/Other
Pitchers: 7 Carlos Alvarez; 3 Gensy Aquino; -- Nathanael Jacinto; 29 Miguel Angel Ledesma; 55 Kelvin Marte; 39 Jose Montijo; 33 Wilfred Paca; -- Yojansy Perez; 26 Victor Pilar; 9 Emmanuel Polo; -- Diego Roldan; -- Diego Serna; Catchers: -- Jeanfranco Fernandez; 16 Angel Mejia; 22 Mathews Sosa; 11 Gabriel Teran; 5 Joseph Uzeta; Infielders: 53 Ariel Dilone; -- Dawry Guerrero; -- Ronnier Heras; 12 Yonaiker Hernandez; -- Gabriel Ollarves; -- Osmy Osorio; 1 Eliander Primera; 23 Endy Rios; Outfielders: -- Rafael Moran; 18 Sebastian Pena; 4 Frederick Saguita	Manager: -- Diego Cedeno; Coaches: -- Nelson Cruz (pitching); -- Rogelio Del Campo (hitting); -- Duanel Jones (hitting); -- Jackson Quezada (pitching); -- Juan Rojas (bench); 7-day injured list; * On San Diego Padres 40-man roster; ~ Development list; # Rehab assignment; ∞ Reserve list; ‡ Restricted list; § Suspended list; † Temporarily inactive list; Roster updated April 30, 2026; Transactions; → More rosters: MiLB • Dominican Summer League; → San Diego Padres minor league players

Dominican Summer League Reds roster
Players	Coaches/Other
Pitchers: 58 Anthony Aquino; 43 Luis Avila; 36 Guillermo Baldelomar; 25 Ramses Camargo; 51 Luisangel Chirino; -- Keury De Jesus; 30 Ariel De La Cruz; 44 Ysaias Escalona; 34 Deivi Garcia; 50 Malvin Garcia; 46 Cesar Maiz; 16 Manuel Marchan; -- Franyer Mendez; -- Jose Navarrete; 60 Nicola Prodanovic; 31 Jonathan Santana; -- Anderson Venero; 55 Luis Yepes; Catchers: 40 Qyshawn Legito; Infielders: 4 Jealmy Frias; 6 Omar Guadamuz; 45 Shendrion Martinus; 9 Riangelo Richardson; 3 Nayerich Waterfort; Outfielders: 26 Jaset Martinez; -- Angel Nuñez; 22 Jose Sabino	Manager: -- Jose Montilla; Coaches: -- Aaron Bond (defensive); -- Takashi Miyoshi (defensive); -- Luis Terrero (hitting); 7-day injured list; * On Cincinnati Reds 40-man roster; ~ Development list; # Rehab assignment; ∞ Reserve list; ‡ Restricted list; § Suspended list; † Temporarily inactive list; Roster updated May 15, 2026; Transactions; → More rosters: MiLB • Dominican Summer League; → Cincinnati Reds minor league players

Dominican Summer League Royals Ventura roster
Players	Coaches/Other
Pitchers: 33 Carlos Beras; 39 Oliver Del Rosario; 74 Diego Figueroa; 46 Carlos Gonzalez; -- Frankeurys Marte; -- Delvin Medina; -- Ernesto Mejia; 53 Kenyer Penaloza; -- Garvell Pinales; 81 Reynell Ramos; 25 Hancer Regalado; 48 Juan Rivera; -- Danny Sanchez; 77 Rafi Santo; 18 Neftali Taveras; 63 Alberto Toribio; Catchers: 19 Jose Montilla; -- Cesar Mora; -- Reynaldo Sanchez; Infielders: 5 Alan Angulo; 0 Warren Calcano; 14 Anderson Garcia; 60 Daniel Liriano; 9 Omar Mejia; 12 Roy Rivero; Outfielders: -- Max De La Cruz; 71 Joshua Fermin; 22 Luis Ramon King	Manager: -- Sergio De Luna; Coaches: -- Onil Joseph (first base); -- Fernando Martinez (hitting); -- Leonel Santiago (pitching); -- Quilvio Veras (bench); 7-day injured list; * On Kansas City Royals 40-man roster; ~ Development list; # Rehab assignment; ∞ Reserve list; ‡ Restricted list; § Suspended list; † Temporarily inactive list; Roster updated May 8, 2026; Transactions; → More rosters: MiLB • Dominican Summer League; → Kansas City Royals minor league players
