= 2023 Southern League season =

- League: Southern League
- Sport: Baseball
- Duration: April 6 – September 17
- Games: 138
- Teams: 8

Regular season
- League champions: Pensacola Blue Wahoos
- Season MVP: Junior Caminero, Montgomery Biscuits

Playoffs
- League champions: Tennessee Smokies
- Runners-up: Pensacola Blue Wahoos

SL seasons
- ← 2022 2024 →

The 2023 Southern League was a Class AA baseball season played between April 6 and September 17. Eight teams played a 138-game schedule, with the top team in each division in each half of the season qualifying for the post-season.

The Tennessee Smokies won the Southern League championship, defeating the Pensacola Blue Wahoos in the playoffs.

== Teams ==
2023 Southern League
| Division | Team | City | MLB Affiliate | Stadium |
| North | Birmingham Barons | Birmingham, Alabama | Chicago White Sox | Regions Field |
| North | Chattanooga Lookouts | Chattanooga, Tennessee | Cincinnati Reds | AT&T Field |
| North | Rocket City Trash Pandas | Madison, Alabama | Los Angeles Angels | Toyota Field |
| North | Tennessee Smokies | Sevierville, Tennessee | Chicago Cubs | Smokies Stadium |
| South | Biloxi Shuckers | Biloxi, Mississippi | Milwaukee Brewers | MGM Park |
| South | Mississippi Braves | Jackson, Mississippi | Atlanta Braves | Trustmark Park |
| South | Montgomery Biscuits | Montgomery, Alabama | Tampa Bay Rays | Montgomery Riverwalk Stadium |
| South | Pensacola Blue Wahoos | Pensacola, Florida | Miami Marlins | Blue Wahoos Stadium |

== Map of teams ==
North Division South Division

== Regular season ==
=== Summary ===
- The Pensacola Blue Wahoos finished the season with the best record in the league for the first time in team history.

==== Overall standings ====
North Division
| Team | Win | Loss | % | GB |
|---|---|---|---|---|
| Tennessee Smokies | 75 | 62 | .547 | – |
| Chattanooga Lookouts | 70 | 67 | .511 | 5 |
| Rocket City Trash Pandas | 58 | 80 | .420 | 17.5 |
| Birmingham Barons | 51 | 87 | .370 | 24.5 |
South Division
| Pensacola Blue Wahoos | 79 | 57 | .581 | – |
| Montgomery Biscuits | 80 | 58 | .580 | – |
| Biloxi Shuckers | 74 | 63 | .540 | 5.5 |
| Mississippi Braves | 62 | 75 | .453 | 17.5 |

==== First half standings ====
North Division
| Team | Win | Loss | % | GB |
|---|---|---|---|---|
| Chattanooga Lookouts | 38 | 30 | .559 | – |
| Tennessee Smokies | 36 | 32 | .529 | 2 |
| Rocket City Trash Pandas | 31 | 38 | .449 | 7.5 |
| Birmingham Barons | 25 | 44 | .362 | 13.5 |
South Division
| Pensacola Blue Wahoos | 41 | 27 | .603 | – |
| Montgomery Biscuits | 36 | 33 | .522 | 5.5 |
| Biloxi Shuckers | 34 | 35 | .493 | 7.5 |
| Mississippi Braves | 33 | 35 | .485 | 8 |

==== Second half standings ====
North Division
| Team | Win | Loss | % | GB |
|---|---|---|---|---|
| Tennessee Smokies | 39 | 30 | .565 | – |
| Chattanooga Lookouts | 32 | 37 | .464 | 7 |
| Rocket City Trash Pandas | 27 | 42 | .391 | 12 |
| Birmingham Barons | 26 | 43 | .377 | 13 |
South Division
| Montgomery Biscuits | 44 | 25 | .638 | – |
| Biloxi Shuckers | 40 | 28 | .588 | 3.5 |
| Pensacola Blue Wahoos | 38 | 30 | .559 | 5.5 |
| Mississippi Braves | 29 | 40 | .420 | 15 |

== League Leaders ==
=== Batting leaders ===
| Stat | Player | Total |
|---|---|---|
| AVG | Blake Dunn, Chattanooga Lookouts | .332 |
| H | Jackson Chourio, Biloxi Shuckers | 143 |
| R | Jackson Chourio, Biloxi Shuckers | 84 |
| 2B | B. J. Murray, Tennessee Smokies | 34 |
| 3B | Jacob Hurtubise, Chattanooga Lookouts | 10 |
| HR | Wes Clarke, Biloxi Shuckers | 26 |
| RBI | Rece Hinds, Chattanooga Lookouts | 98 |
| SB | Nasim Nuñez, Pensacola Blue Wahoos | 52 |

=== Pitching leaders ===
| Stat | Player | Total |
|---|---|---|
| W | Walker Powell, Tennessee Smokies | 11 |
| ERA | Carlos Rodríguez, Biloxi Shuckers | 2.77 |
| CG | Mason Erla, Rocket City Trash Pandas; Jack Kochanowicz, Rocket City Trash Pandas; Anthony Molina, Montgomery Biscuits; Tobias Myers, Biloxi Shuckers; Logan Workman, Montgomery Biscuits | 1 |
| SHO | Tobias Myers, Biloxi Shuckers | 1 |
| SV | Cam Robinson, Biloxi Shuckers | 15 |
| IP | Tobias Myers, Biloxi Shuckers | 137.2 |
| SO | Tobias Myers, Biloxi Shuckers | 168 |

== Playoffs ==
- The Tennessee Smokies won their fourth Southern League championship, defeating the Pensacola Blue Wahoos in two games.

=== Playoff bracket ===
Division finals
N1 | Tennessee | 2
N2 | Chattanooga | 0
S1 | Pensacola | 2
S2 | Montgomery | 0

Finals
N1 | Tennessee | 2
S1 | Pensacola | 0

== Awards ==
Southern League awards
| Award name | Recipient |
|---|---|
| Most Valuable Player | Junior Caminero, Montgomery Biscuits |
| Pitcher of the Year | Carlos Rodríguez, Biloxi Shuckers |
| Top MLB Prospect Award | Junior Caminero, Montgomery Biscuits |
| Manager of the Year | Kevin Randle, Pensacola Blue Wahoos |

== See also ==
- 2023 Major League Baseball season
