= 2021 Double-A South season =

- League: Double-A South
- Sport: Baseball
- Duration: May 4 – September 19
- Number of games: 120
- Number of teams: 8

Regular season
- League champions: Mississippi Braves
- Season MVP: Jonathan Aranda, Montgomery Biscuits

Playoffs
- League champions: Mississippi Braves
- Runners-up: Montgomery Biscuits

SL seasons
- ← 2020 2022 →

The 2021 Double-A South League was a Class AA baseball season played between May 4 and September 19. Eight teams played a 120-game schedule, with the top two teams in the league making the post-season.

The Mississippi Braves won the Southern League championship, defeating the Montgomery Biscuits in the playoffs.

== League changes ==
- As part of Major League Baseball's reorganization of the minor leagues, the Southern League was renamed the "Double-A South".
- The league was downsized from ten teams to eight teams.

== Team changes ==
- In conjunction with Major League Baseball's reorganization of the minor leagues after the 2020 season, the Jackson Generals were not invited to serve as any team's affiliate, effectively ending their affiliation with the Arizona Diamondbacks and their run in affiliated baseball.
- In conjunction with Major League Baseball's reorganization of the minor leagues after the 2020 season, the Jacksonville Jumbo Shrimp were selected to move up to the Triple-A classification.
- The Pensacola Blue Wahoos ended their affiliation with the Minnesota Twins and began a new affiliation with the Miami Marlins.

== Teams ==
2021 Double-A South
Division	Team	City	MLB Affiliate	Stadium
North	Birmingham Barons	Birmingham, Alabama	Chicago White Sox	Regions Field
North	Chattanooga Lookouts	Chattanooga, Tennessee	Cincinnati Reds	AT&T Field
North	Rocket City Trash Pandas	Madison, Alabama	Los Angeles Angels	Toyota Field
North	Tennessee Smokies	Sevierville, Tennessee	Chicago Cubs	Smokies Stadium
South	Biloxi Shuckers	Biloxi, Mississippi	Milwaukee Brewers	MGM Park
South	Mississippi Braves	Jackson, Mississippi	Atlanta Braves	Trustmark Park
South	Montgomery Biscuits	Montgomery, Alabama	Tampa Bay Rays	Montgomery Riverwalk Stadium
South	Pensacola Blue Wahoos	Pensacola, Florida	Miami Marlins	Blue Wahoos Stadium

== Map of teams ==
North Division South Division

== Regular season ==
=== Summary ===
- The Mississippi Braves finished the season with the best record in the league for the first time since 2014.

=== Standings ===
North Division
Team	Win	Loss	%	GB
Birmingham Barons	62	56	.525	–
Chattanooga Lookouts	58	54	.518	1
Rocket City Trash Pandas	54	56	.491	4
Tennessee Smokies	46	63	.422	11.5
South Division
Mississippi Braves	67	44	.604	–
Montgomery Biscuits	62	55	.530	8
Pensacola Blue Wahoos	57	54	.514	10
Biloxi Shuckers	45	69	.395	23.5

== League Leaders ==
=== Batting leaders ===
Stat	Player	Total
AVG	Jonathan Aranda, Montgomery Biscuits	.325
H	Lorenzo Cedroia, Chattanooga Lookouts	130
R	Peyton Burdick, Pensacola Blue Wahoos	71
2B	David MacKinnon, Rocket City Trash Pandas	30
3B	Lorenzo Cedroia, Chattanooga Lookouts; TJ Hopkins, Chattanooga Lookouts	7
HR	Peyton Burdick, Pensacola Blue Wahoos; Mitch Nay, Rocket City Trash Pandas	23
RBI	David MacKinnon, Rocket City Trash Pandas	65
SB	Justin Dean, Mississippi Braves	29

=== Pitching leaders ===
Stat	Player	Total
W	Ivan Pelaez, Montgomery Biscuits; Randy Wynne, Chattanooga Lookouts	8
ERA	Jake Eder, Pensacola Blue Wahoos	1.77
SV	Colton Hock, Pensacola Blue Wahoos	19
IP	Noah Zavolas, Biloxi Shuckers	120.2
SO	Noah Zavolas, Biloxi Shuckers	121

== Playoffs ==
- The playoffs were shortened to one round, with the top two teams in the league playing for the championship.
- The Mississippi Braves won the Double-A South championship, defeating the Montgomery Biscuits in five games.

=== Playoff bracket ===
Finals
1	Mississippi	3
2	Montgomery	2

== Awards ==
Double-A South awards
Award name	Recipient
Most Valuable Player	Jonathan Aranda, Montgomery Biscuits
Pitcher of the Year	Max Meyer, Pensacola Blue Wahoos
Manager of the Year	Dan Meyer, Mississippi Braves
Top MLB Prospect Award	Shea Langeliers, Mississippi Braves

== See also ==
- 2021 Major League Baseball season
