= 2019 Southern League season =

- League: Southern League
- Sport: Baseball
- Duration: April 4 – September 2
- Games: 140
- Teams: 10

Regular season
- League champions: Montgomery Biscuits
- Season MVP: Drew Waters, Mississippi Braves

Playoffs
- League champions: Jackson Generals
- Runners-up: Biloxi Shuckers

SL seasons
- ← 2018 2020 →

The 2019 Southern League was a Class AA baseball season played between April 4 and September 2. Ten teams played a 140-game schedule, with the top team in each division in each half of the season qualifying for the post-season.

The Jackson Generals won the Southern League championship, defeating the Biloxi Shuckers in the playoffs.

== Team changes ==
- The Chattanooga Lookouts ended their affiliation with the Minnesota Twins and began a new affiliation with the Cincinnati Reds.
- The Pensacola Blue Wahoos ended their affiliation with the Cincinnati Reds and began a new affiliation with the Minnesota Twins.

== Teams ==
2019 Southern League
Division	Team	City	MLB Affiliate	Stadium
North	Birmingham Barons	Birmingham, Alabama	Chicago White Sox	Regions Field
North	Chattanooga Lookouts	Chattanooga, Tennessee	Cincinnati Reds	AT&T Field
North	Jackson Generals	Jackson, Tennessee	Arizona Diamondbacks	The Ballpark at Jackson
North	Montgomery Biscuits	Montgomery, Alabama	Tampa Bay Rays	Montgomery Riverwalk Stadium
North	Tennessee Smokies	Sevierville, Tennessee	Chicago Cubs	Smokies Stadium
South	Biloxi Shuckers	Biloxi, Mississippi	Milwaukee Brewers	MGM Park
South	Jacksonville Jumbo Shrimp	Jacksonville, Florida	Miami Marlins	Baseball Grounds of Jacksonville
South	Mississippi Braves	Jackson, Mississippi	Atlanta Braves	Trustmark Park
South	Mobile BayBears	Mobile, Alabama	Los Angeles Angels	Hank Aaron Stadium
South	Pensacola Blue Wahoos	Pensacola, Florida	Minnesota Twins	Blue Wahoos Stadium

== Map of teams ==
North Division South Division

== Regular season ==
=== Summary ===
- The Montgomery Biscuits finished the season with the best record in the league for the first time since 2007.

=== Standings ===
North Division
Team	Win	Loss	%	GB
Montgomery Biscuits	88	50	.638	–
Jackson Generals	78	57	.578	8.5
Birmingham Barons	64	72	.471	23
Chattanooga Lookouts	61	75	.449	26
Tennessee Smokies	58	81	.417	30.5
South Division
Biloxi Shuckers	82	57	.590	–
Pensacola Blue Wahoos	76	63	.547	6
Jacksonville Jumbo Shrimp	66	71	.482	15
Mississippi Braves	64	75	.460	18
Mobile BayBears	50	86	.368	30.5

== League leaders ==
=== Batting leaders ===
Stat	Player	Total
AVG	Drew Waters, Mississippi Braves	.319
H	Drew Waters, Mississippi Braves	134
R	Daulton Varsho, Jackson Generals	85
2B	Drew Waters, Mississippi Braves	35
3B	Drew Waters, Mississippi Braves	9
HR	Ibandel Isabel, Chattanooga Lookouts	26
RBI	Gavin Sheets, Birmingham Barons	83
SB	Lucius Fox, Montgomery Biscuits	37

=== Pitching leaders ===
Stat	Player	Total
W	Josh Fleming, Montgomery Biscuits; Kenny Rosenberg, Montgomery Biscuits; Trey Supak, Biloxi Shuckers	11
ERA	Tucker Davidson, Mississippi Braves	2.03
CG	Josh Fleming, Montgomery Biscuits	3
SHO	Josh Fleming, Montgomery Biscuits; Greg Mahle, Mobile BayBears; Riley O'Brien, Montgomery Biscuits; Joel Payamps, Jackson Generals; Matt Peacock, Jackson Generals; Trey Supak, Biloxi Shuckers	1
SV	Nate Griep, Biloxi Shuckers	22
IP	Cory Abbott, Tennessee Smokies	146.2
SO	Corey Abbott, Tennessee Smokies	166

== Playoffs ==
- The Jackson Generals won their second consecutive, and fourth overall Southern League championship, defeating the Biloxi Shuckers in five games.

=== Playoff bracket ===
Division finals
N1	Montgomery	1
N2	Jackson	3
S1	Biloxi	3
S2	Pensacola	2

Finals
N1	Jackson	3
S1	Biloxi	2

== Awards ==
Southern League awards
Award name	Recipient
Most Valuable Player	Drew Waters, Mississippi Braves
Pitcher of the Year	Trey Supak, Biloxi Shuckers
Manager of the Year	Morgan Ensberg, Montgomery Biscuits

== See also ==
- 2019 Major League Baseball season
