= 2020 Southern League season =

- League: Southern League
- Sport: Baseball
- Teams: 10

Regular season

Playoffs
- League champions: Canceled

SL seasons
- ← 2019 2021 →

The 2020 Southern League would have been a Class AA baseball season played between April 9 and September 7. Ten teams would have played a 140-game schedule, with two teams from each division competing in the playoffs.

The Southern League was canceled due to the COVID-19 pandemic.

== Team changes ==
- The Mobile BayBears relocated to Madison, Alabama and were renamed to the Rocket City Trash Pandas. The team moved from the South Division to the North Division. The club remained affiliated with the Los Angeles Angels.
- The Montgomery Biscuits moved from the North Division to the South Division.

== Teams ==
2020 Southern League
| Division | Team | City | MLB Affiliate | Stadium |
| North | Birmingham Barons | Birmingham, Alabama | Chicago White Sox | Regions Field |
| North | Chattanooga Lookouts | Chattanooga, Tennessee | Cincinnati Reds | AT&T Field |
| North | Jackson Generals | Jackson, Tennessee | Arizona Diamondbacks | The Ballpark at Jackson |
| North | Rocket City Trash Pandas | Madison, Alabama | Los Angeles Angels | Toyota Field |
| North | Tennessee Smokies | Sevierville, Tennessee | Chicago Cubs | Smokies Stadium |
| South | Biloxi Shuckers | Biloxi, Mississippi | Milwaukee Brewers | MGM Park |
| South | Jacksonville Jumbo Shrimp | Jacksonville, Florida | Miami Marlins | VyStar Ballpark |
| South | Mississippi Braves | Jackson, Mississippi | Atlanta Braves | Trustmark Park |
| South | Montgomery Biscuits | Montgomery, Alabama | Tampa Bay Rays | Montgomery Riverwalk Stadium |
| South | Pensacola Blue Wahoos | Pensacola, Florida | Minnesota Twins | Blue Wahoos Stadium |

== Map of teams ==
North Division South Division

== Regular season ==
- On March 13, Pat O'Conner, the president of Minor League Baseball, announced that the start of the season would be postponed due to the COVID-19 pandemic.
- On June 30, the season was canceled due to Major League Baseball announcing that it will not provide its affiliated minor league teams with players for the 2020 season.

== See also ==
- 2020 Major League Baseball season
