= 2022 Southern League season =

- League: Southern League
- Sport: Baseball
- Duration: April 8 – September 18
- Games: 138
- Teams: 8

Regular season
- League champions: Rocket City Trash Pandas
- Season MVP: Jakson Reetz, Biloxi Shuckers

Playoffs
- League champions: Pensacola Blue Wahoos
- Runners-up: Tennessee Smokies

SL seasons
- ← 2021 2023 →

The 2022 Southern League was a Class AA baseball season played between April 8 and September 18. Eight teams played a 138-game schedule, with the top team in each division in each half of the season qualifying for the post-season.

The Pensacola Blue Wahoos won the Southern League championship, defeating the Tennessee Smokies in the playoffs.

== League changes ==
- Following MLB's acquisition of the rights to the names of the historical minor leagues, the Southern League name was restored effective with the 2022 season.

== Teams ==
2022 Southern League
Division	Team	City	MLB Affiliate	Stadium
North	Birmingham Barons	Birmingham, Alabama	Chicago White Sox	Regions Field
North	Chattanooga Lookouts	Chattanooga, Tennessee	Cincinnati Reds	AT&T Field
North	Rocket City Trash Pandas	Madison, Alabama	Los Angeles Angels	Toyota Field
North	Tennessee Smokies	Sevierville, Tennessee	Chicago Cubs	Smokies Stadium
South	Biloxi Shuckers	Biloxi, Mississippi	Milwaukee Brewers	MGM Park
South	Mississippi Braves	Jackson, Mississippi	Atlanta Braves	Trustmark Park
South	Montgomery Biscuits	Montgomery, Alabama	Tampa Bay Rays	Montgomery Riverwalk Stadium
South	Pensacola Blue Wahoos	Pensacola, Florida	Miami Marlins	Blue Wahoos Stadium

== Map of teams ==
North Division South Division

== Regular season ==
=== Summary ===
- The Rocket City Trash Pandas finished the season with the best record in the league for the first time in team history.

==== Oberall standings ====
North Division
Team	Win	Loss	%	GB
Rocket City Trash Pandas	81	57	.587	–
Tennessee Smokies	71	66	.518	9.5
Chattanooga Lookouts	61	75	.449	19
Birmingham Barons	61	77	.442	20
South Division
Montgomery Biscuits	70	61	.534	–
Pensacola Blue Wahoos	68	63	.519	2
Biloxi Shuckers	67	68	.496	5
Mississippi Braves	62	74	.456	10.5

==== First half standings ====
North Division
Team	Win	Loss	%	GB
Rocket City Trash Pandas	41	28	.594	–
Tennessee Smokies	37	32	.536	4
Chattanooga Lookouts	34	35	.493	7
Birmingham Barons	31	38	.449	10
South Division
Pensacola Blue Wahoos	35	29	.547	–
Biloxi Shuckers	34	33	.507	2.5
Montgomery Biscuits	28	34	.452	6
Mississippi Braves	29	40	.420	8.5

==== Second half standings ====
North Division
Team	Win	Loss	%	GB
Rocket City Trash Pandas	40	29	.580	–
Tennessee Smokies	34	34	.500	5.5
Birmingham Barons	30	39	.435	10
Chattanooga Lookouts	27	40	.403	12
South Division
Montgomery Biscuits	42	27	.609	–
Mississippi Braves	33	34	.493	8
Pensacola Blue Wahoos	33	34	.493	8
Biloxi Shuckers	33	35	.485	8.5

== League Leaders ==
=== Batting leaders ===
Stat	Player	Total
AVG	Jake Slaughter, Tennessee Smokies	.293
H	Bryce Ball, Tennessee Smokies	129
R	Brett Wisely, Montgomery Biscuits	84
2B	Yonathan Perlaza, Tennessee Smokies	36
3B	Michael Siani, Chattanooga Lookouts	7
HR	Drew Lugbauer, Mississippi Braves	28
RBI	Drew Lugbauer, Mississippi Braves	82
SB	Michael Siani, Chattanooga Lookouts	49

=== Pitching leaders ===
Stat	Player	Total
W	Coleman Crow, Rocket City Trash Pandas; Tanner Gordon, Mississippi Braves	9
ERA	Ky Bush, Rocket City Trash Pandas	3.67
CG	Andrew Abbott, Chattanooga Lookouts; Víctor Castañeda, Biloxi Shuckers; Tanner Gordon, Mississippi Braves; Jeff Lindgren, Pensacola Blue Wahoos; Jared Shuster, Mississippi Braves; Allan Winans, Mississippi Braves	1
SHO	Andrew Abbott, Chattanooga Lookouts; Jeff Lindgren, Pensacola Blue Wahoos; Jared Shuster, Mississippi Braves	1
SV	Eric Torres, Rocket City Trash Pandas	22
IP	Coleman Crow, Rocket City Trash Pandas	128.0
SO	Alan Rangel, Mississippi Braves	139

== Playoffs ==
- The playoffs were expanded to a divisional final round and a final round.
- Each series is a best-of-three.
- The Pensacola Blue Wahoos won their second Southern League championship, defeating the Tennessee Smokies in three games.

=== Playoff bracket ===
Division finals
N1	Rocket City	1
N2	Tennessee	2
S1	Montgomery	1
S2	Pensacola	2

Finals
N2	Tennessee	1
S2	Pensacola	2

== Awards ==
Southern League awards
Award name	Recipient
Most Valuable Player	Jakson Reetz, Biloxi Shuckers
Pitcher of the Year	Chase Silseth, Rocket City Trash Pandas
Top MLB Prospect Award	Taj Bradley, Montgomery Biscuits
Manager of the Year	Andy Schatzley, Rocket City Trash Pandas

== See also ==
- 2022 Major League Baseball season
