= Los Angeles Angels minor league players =

Below is a partial list of Minor League Baseball players in the Los Angeles Angels system.

== Players ==
=== Hayden Alvarez ===
Hayden Alvarez

Los Angeles Angels
- Outfielder
- Born: March 19, 2007 (age 19); Bonao, Dominican Republic
- Bats: Right Throws: Right

Hayden Samuel Alvarez (born March 19, 2007) is a Dominican professional baseball outfielder in the Los Angeles Angels organization.

Alvarez signed with the Los Angeles Angels organization as an international free agent in January 2024 for $685,000, marking the second highest signing bonus as an international free agent for the Angels that year. He made his professional debut that year with the Rookie-Level Dominican Summer League Angels, hitting .250 with a home run and 32 stolen bases. Alvarez started the 2025 season with the Rookie-Level Arizona Complex League Angels. He slashed .335/.427/.429 with two home runs and 24 stolen bases in 55 games at ACL Angels, being promoted to the Single-A Inland Empire 66ers on August 2.

Alvarez started the 2026 season with the Single-A Rancho Cucamonga Quakes and was promoted to the High-A Tri-City Dust Devils in August, after slashing 296/.396/.479 with 11 home runs, 26 doubles and five triples in 96 games with the Rancho. Between the two levels, he hit .289 with 12 home runs, 32 doubles and 62 RBI. Following the season, he was named the Angels Hitting Prospect of the Year and Breakout Prospect of the Year by MLB Pipeline. On September 9, he was selected as the first overall pick in the 2026 LIDOM Rookie Draft by the Tigres del Licey.

- Career statistics from Baseball Reference (Minors)

=== Brady Choban ===
Brady Choban

Los Angeles Angels
- Pitcher
- Born: September 16, 2000 (age 26); Barberton, Ohio, U.S.
- Bats: Right Throws: Right

Brady Choban (born September 16, 2000) is an American professional baseball pitcher in the Los Angeles Angels organization.

Choban attended Lewis-Palmer High School. He played college baseball at Marshall University in 2019 - 2021 seasons. At Marshall, he went 1 - 4 in 14 games. In 2022 - 2023 season, he committed to University of Rio Grande. He recorded 0-2 with a 4.70 ERA in 8 games as a starting pitcher in 2023, finishing 2 seasons at Rio Grande with a 5.11 ERA, 56 strikeouts and 18 walks over 37 innings.

The Los Angeles Angels signed with Choban as an undrafted free agent in 2023. He made his professional debut that year with Rookie-Level Arizona Complex League Angels. He started 2024 with High-A Tri-City Dust Devils, and was promoted to Double-A Rocket City Trash Pandas during the season. He started 2025 with Double-A, posting a 2.64 ERA with 37 strikeouts and a 1.24 WHIP in 41.1 innings pitched over 39 games. He was promoted to Triple-A Salt Lake Bees in August.

- Career statistics from Baseball Reference (Minors)

=== Jacob Cozart ===
Jacob Cozart

Los Angeles Angels
- Catcher
- Born: January 9, 2003 (age 23); Orlando, Florida, U.S.
- Bats: Left Throws: Right

Jacob Hayes Cozart (born January 9, 2003) is an American professional baseball catcher in the Los Angeles Angels organization.

Cozart grew up in High Point, North Carolina and attended Wesleyan Christian Academy. He played college baseball at NC State University.

Cozart became the starting catcher for the NC State Wolfpack baseball during his freshman season in 2022 and batted .240. After the season, he played collegiate summer baseball with the Falmouth Commodores of the Cape Cod Baseball League. He was named second-team All-Atlantic Coast Conference (ACC) as a sophomore after batting .301 with 10 home runs, 14 doubles, and 42 RBI. He was named first-team All-ACC after batting .305 with 19 home runs as a junior in 2024.

Cozart was selected by the Cleveland Guardians in the second round of 2024 Major League Baseball draft. He signed with the team for $2.05 million.

Cozart made his professional debut after signing with the High-A Lake County Captains and hit .119 across 13 games. In 2025, he played with Lake County and the Double-A Akron RubberDucks and batted .235 with nine home runs and 49 RBI across 93 games with both teams. Cozart returned to Akron to start the 2026 season.

On August 3, 2026, the Guardians traded Cozart to the Los Angeles Angels in exchange for Jo Adell.

Cozart's father, Craig Cozart, is a college baseball coach and served as the head coach of the High Point Panthers from 2009 to 2021.

- Career statistics from MLB · Baseball Reference (Minors)
- NC State Wolfpack bio

=== Gabriel Davalillo ===
Gabriel Davalillo

Los Angeles Angels
- Catcher
- Born: November 6, 2007 (age 19); Caracas, Venezuela
- Bats: Right Throws: Right

Gabriel Jose Davalillo (born November 6, 2007) is a Venezuelan professional baseball catcher in the Los Angeles Angels organization.

Davalillo signed with the Los Angeles Angels organization in January 2025 for a $2.0 million bonus. He was considered as the top catching prospect in 2025 international class. He made his professional debut that year with the Rookie-Level Dominican Summer League Angels and slashed .302/.408/.518 with seven home runs and three stolen bases in 41 games, being named to the DSL AL Mid-Season All-Star team.

Davalillo is the grandson of Vic Davalillo, who played in Major League Baseball across 16 seasons including the California Angels during 1968 - 1969 and became a member of Venezuelan Baseball Hall of Fame and Museum. His uncle is Pompeyo Davalillo, who was older brother of Vic and also played in Major League Baseball. His father, David Davalillo, is a former professional baseball player who played in the Angels’ organization. His older brother, David Davalillo, is also a professional baseball pitcher in the Texas Rangers’ system.

Davalillo was selected as a representative of Venezuela team in the 2023 WBSC U-18 Baseball World Cup, playing 8 games.

- Career statistics from Baseball Reference (Minors)

=== Mason Erla ===
Mason Erla

Los Angeles Angels
- Pitcher
- Born: August 19, 1997 (age 29); Bay City, Michigan, U.S.
- Bats: Right Throws: Right

Mason Andrew Erla (born August 19, 1997) is an American baseball pitcher in the Los Angeles Angels organization.

Erla played college baseball at Michigan State for five seasons. He pitched in two games as a freshman before tearing the Latissimus dorsi muscle in his pitching shoulder and using a medical redshirt. In 2018, he briefly played collegiate summer baseball with the Yarmouth–Dennis Red Sox of the Cape Cod Baseball League. Erla went 2-0 four starts before the 2020 season was cut short due to the coronavirus pandemic. As a redshirt junior, he had a 5-6 record with a 3.50 ERA 80 strikeouts.

Erla was selected in the 17th round by the Los Angeles Angels in the 2021 Major League Baseball draft. After signing with the team he was assigned to the Arizona Complex League Angels and made two appearances before being promoted to the High-A Tri-City Dust Devils. Erla was assigned to the Double-A Rocket City Trash Pandas at the start of the 2022 season. After his first start, Erla was placed on the injured list due to shoulder soreness and did not return for six weeks.

- Career statistics from Baseball Reference (Minors)
- Michigan State Spartans bio

=== Juan Flores ===
Juan Flores

Los Angeles Angels
- Catcher
- Born: February 13, 2006 (age 20); Quíbor, Venezuela
- Bats: Right Throws: Right

Juan Daniel Flores (born February 13, 2006) is a Venezuelan professional baseball catcher in the Los Angeles Angels organization.

Flores signed with the Los Angeles Angels organization in January 2023 for $280,000. He made his professional debut that year with the Rookie-Level Dominican Summer League Angels, slashing .236/.352/.388 with 6 home runs, 26 RBIs and 6 stolen bases in 46 games.

Flores started 2024 with the Single-A Inland Empire 66ers, and was promoted to the High-A Tri-City Dust Devils in June. Between the two levels, he had a combined slash line of .254/.312/.372 with 5 home runs and 4 stolen bases. He spent 2025 with the High-A, slashing .207/.283/.341 with 10 home runs, 11 doubles and 40 RBIs in 89 games. After the season, he played in Arizona Fall League for the Salt River Rafters, being named to the Arizona Fall League Fall Stars Game. He started 2026 with the High-A. In April, he was selected as the best defensive prospect in the Angels' farm system by MLB pipeline. On June 22, he was promoted to the Double-A Rocket City Trash Pandas, after slashing .275/.341/.538 with 11 home runs across 46 games in the High-A.

- Career statistics from Baseball Reference (Minors)

=== Ben Gobbel ===
Ben Gobbel

Los Angeles Angels
- Infielder
- Born: November 2, 1999 (age 27); Cumming, Georgia, U.S.
- Bats: Right Throws: Right

Benjamin Thomas Gobbel (born November 2, 1999) is an American professional baseball infielder in the Los Angeles Angels organization.

Gobbel attended Pinecrest Academy and played college baseball at Belmont Abbey College in Belmont, North Carolina. In 2022 season as a senior, he batted .371 with 16 home runs, 71 RBI, and 13 stolen bases, leading the team with batting average, hits, RBI, and home runs. Following the season, he was named to the Conference Carolinas All-Conference First Team. Also he was named to the All-Southeast Region Team by D2CCA, NCBWA and ABCA.

The Los Angeles Angels signed with Gobbel as an undrafted free agent in 2022. He made his professional debut that year with the Rookie-Level Arizona Complex League Angels.

Gobbel played the 2023 season for the Single-A Inland Empire 66ers, hitting .267 in 59 games. He split the 2024 season with the High-A Tri-City Dust Devils and the Double-A Rocket City Trash Pandas. Gobbel started the 2025 season with the High-A, batting .284 with nine home runs, 30 RBI, four stolen bases, and an .857 OPS. On June 17, he was assigned to Double-A. On September 13, Gobbel promoted to the Triple-A Salt Lake Bees.

Gobbel's grandfather, Tom Paciorek, is a former Major League Baseball player.

- Career statistics from Baseball Reference (Minors)
- Belmont Abbey Crusaders bio

=== Austin Gordon ===
Austin Gordon

Los Angeles Angels
- Pitcher
- Born: June 14, 2003 (age 23); Myrtle Beach, South Carolina, U.S.
- Bats: Right Throws: Right

Austin Michael Gordon (born June 14, 2003) is an American professional baseball pitcher in the Los Angeles Angels organization.

Gordon attended Myrtle Beach High School and played college baseball at the Clemson University. In his 2022 season as a freshman, he pitched as a relief pitcher, recording a 1-0 with a 5.14 ERA, 2 saves and 31 strikeouts in 28.0 innings pitched. In his 2023 season as a sophomore, he pitched in 16 games as a starting pitcher, posting a 4.61 ERA and 76 strikeouts in 84.0 innings pitched. In his 2024 season as a junior, he mainly pitched as a closer, earning 11 saves with a 4.35 ERA and 53 strikeouts in 39.1 innings. Following the season, he was given the Stowe Award as the Clemson’s most valuable pitcher of 2024. At Clemson, he went a 5-6 record with an 4.64 ERA and 160 strikeouts in 151.1 innings pitched during 3 years.

The Los Angeles Angels drafted Gordon in the 4th round of the 2024 Major League Baseball draft, the 110th overall selection. He signed with the team for a $572,500 bonus. Gordon made his professional debut in 2025 with the High-A Tri-City Dust Devils, posting a 4-5 record with a 5.44 ERA and 95 strikeouts in 84.1 innings pitched as a starting pitcher.

Gordon played the whole 2026 season with the Double-A Rocket City Trash Pandas. On August 27, he pitched the first seven innings of a combined no-hitter against the Birmingham Barons along with Lucas Mahlstedt and Camden Minacci, making it the third no-hitter in Rocket City Trash Pandas history. He was named the Southern League Pitcher of the Month for August, posting a 4-0 record with 1.44 ERA, 33 strikeouts and a 0.60 WHIP in 25.0 innings pitched across four starts.

- Career statistics from Baseball Reference (Minors)
- Clemson Tigers bio

=== C. J. Gray ===
C. J. Gray

Los Angeles Angels
- Pitcher
- Born: January 25, 2007 (age 19); Kannapolis, North Carolina, U.S.
- Bats: Right Throws: Right

Charlie Junior Gray (born January 25, 2007) is an American professional baseball pitcher in the Los Angeles Angels organization.

Gray attended A.L. Brown High School in North Carolina. He threw more than 2,000 pitches in his four-year varsity career. In football, he threw for 4,120 yards across three seasons as the starting quarterback, throwing 34 touchdowns and rushing for 15 more. He also played basketball his first 2 years in high school. In 2025 season as a baseball player, he was named Greater Metro Conference Player of the Year despite his team recorded 2-10 in conference play. He hit .508 with 11 home runs, and recorded 3-1 on the mound.

The Los Angeles Angels drafted Gray in the 5th round of the 2025 Major League Baseball draft, the 140th overall selection. He had some scholarship offers to play quarterback, but he chose to play baseball. He signed with the team for a $1,247,500 bonus, above the slot value of $519,000 for the pick.

- Career statistics from Baseball Reference (Minors)

=== Trey Gregory-Alford ===
Trey Gregory-Alford

Los Angeles Angels
- Pitcher
- Born: May 4, 2006 (age 20); Colorado Springs, Colorado, U.S.
- Bats: Right Throws: Right

Trey Robert Gregory-Alford (born May 4, 2006) is an American professional baseball pitcher in the Los Angeles Angels organization.

Gregory-Alford attended Coronado High School, where he emerged as a notable baseball prospect; The Gazette later dubbed him "the most valued high school draftee in Colorado Springs history." In 2024, he recorded a 2-0 with a 1.84 ERA, a save and 94 strikeouts in 45.1 innings pitched while slashing .492/.597/1.033 with 34 RBI, 7 home runs and 26 runs scored as a first baseman. After the season, he was named Colorado's Gatorade Player of the Year, being the first player chosen from Coronado High School.

The Los Angeles Angels drafted Gregory-Alford in the 11th round of the 2024 Major League Baseball draft. He had the commitment to play college baseball at University of Virginia, but On July 22, he signed with the team for a $1.95 million bonus, setting an MLB record for the highest bonus in the fourth round or later of the draft.

Gregory-Alford started 2025 with Rookie-Level Arizona Complex League Angels. He pitched 12 games including 10 as a starting pitcher, recording a 3.54 ERA, 53 strikeouts in 56.1 innings. He was promoted to Single-A Inland Empire 66ers on August 2. In 25.1 innings at Single-A, he posted a 1.42 ERA, 1.14 WHIP and 20 strikeouts.

- Career statistics from Baseball Reference (Minors)

=== Talon Haley ===
Talon Haley

Los Angeles Angels
- Pitcher
- Born: January 22, 2006 (age 20); Southaven, Mississippi, U.S.
- Bats: Right Throws: Left

Talon Haley (born January 22, 2006) is an American professional baseball pitcher in the Los Angeles Angels organization.

Haley attended Lewisburg High School in Mississippi. In his amateur career, he underwent Tommy John surgery twice, firstly in 8th grade, secondly in junior year. Even worse, he was diagnosed as having a stage 3 non-Hodgkin lymphoma with a high risk in his spleen, in his freshman year of high school. By the end of his sophomore year, he was deemed to be in full remission. Overcoming these hardships, he was considered as one of the most intriguing players in the 2025 MLB draft class.

In 2023 season, he recorded 8-0 with a 1.99 ERA and 103 strikeouts, allowing 37 hits and 18 earned runs in 16 appearances. In 2024 season, he recorded 4-1 with a 1.83 ERA and 43 strikeouts in 23 innings while hitting .390. In 2025 season, he was named 7A Mr. Baseball in Mississippi. As a senior, he recorded 5-1 with a 0.55 ERA and 81 strikeouts while hitting .410 with 32 hits and 23 RBIs. In high school, he had a career ERA of 1.94 and a 13-2 record with 152 strikeouts.

The Los Angeles Angels drafted Haley in the 12th round of the 2025 Major League Baseball draft, the 349th overall selection. He had the commitment to play college baseball at Vanderbilt University, but he signed with the team for a $897,500 bonus, above the slot value of $150,000 for the pick.

- Career statistics from Baseball Reference (Minors)

=== Joel Hurtado ===
Joel Hurtado

Los Angeles Angels
- Pitcher
- Born: February 6, 2001 (age 25); Puerto Plata, Dominican Republic
- Bats: Right Throws: Right

Joel Alexander Hurtado (born February 6, 2001) is a Dominican professional baseball pitcher in the Los Angeles Angels organization.

Hurtado signed with the Los Angeles Angels as an international free agent in 2022 for a $10,000 bonus. He made his professional debut that year with the Rookie-Level Dominican Summer League Angels, posting a 3.50 ERA with 21 strikeouts in 18.0 innings pitched. He spent 2023 with the Single-A Inland Empire 66ers, and spent 2024 with the High-A Tri-City Dust Devils.

Hurtado started 2025 with the Double-A Rocket City Trash Pandas and made 18 appearances as a starting pitcher there. He had a 2.70 ERA with 56 strikeouts, 27 walks and 6 home runs allowed in 86.2 innings pitched at Double-A, to be promoted to the Triple-A Salt Lake Bees on September 20. According to Baseball America, he threw a 104.4 mph pitch during the season, setting the hardest pitch in the 2025 Minor League Baseball.

Hurtado started the 2026 season with the Double-A. On August, he was promoted to the Triple-A after recording 6-4 with a 3.63 ERA and 83 strikeouts in 101.2 innings pitched across 20 games.

- Career statistics from Baseball Reference (Minors)

=== Dylan Jordan ===
Dylan Jordan

Los Angeles Angels
- Pitcher
- Born: October 15, 2005 (age 21); Springfield, Virginia, U.S.
- Bats: Right Throws: Right

Dylan Christopher Jordan (born October 15, 2005) is an American professional baseball pitcher in the Los Angeles Angels organization.

Jordan played baseball at Viera High School in Viera, Florida, and committed to play college baseball for the Florida State Seminoles. In his 2022-23 season as a junior, he recorded a 7-2 with a 0.69 earned run average (ERA), 87 strikeouts and 22 walks in 51 innings pitched. Following the season, he was named to the Prep Baseball Report Florida All-State First Team as a starting pitcher. In his 2023–24 senior season, Jordan posted a 1.32 ERA with 103 strikeouts in 58 1/3 innings.

The Angels selected Jordan in the fifth round of the 2024 Major League Baseball draft, the 143rd overall pick. On July 18, Jordan signed with the team for a $1.2 million bonus, above the league-recommended slot value of $480,000 for the pick.

Jordan started his professional baseball career 2025 with the Rookie-Level Arizona Complex League Angels. He posted a 3.21 ERA, 1.36 WHIP and 55strikeouts in 47.2 innings at ACL angels, being promoted to the Single-A Inland Empire 66ers. He was named California League Pitcher of the Month for August, went 2-0 with a 1.05 ERA in 6 starts, allowing 3 earned runs on 15 hits and 7 walks over 25.2 innings pitched. Also he led the league in ERA, WHIP, batting average against and hits allowed per nine innings. He posted a 0.94 ERA with 0.98 WHIP and 30strikeouts in 28.2 innings across 7 starts for the Single-A. Over 76.1 innings pitched between the two levels, he had a 2.36 ERA, 10.0 K/9 rate and .222 BAA, to be named the Los Angeles Angels Pitching Prospect of the Year by MLB Pipeline.

- Career statistics from Baseball Reference (Minors)

=== Barrett Kent ===
Barrett Kent

Los Angeles Angels
- Pitcher
- Born: September 29, 2004 (age 22); Denison, Texas, U.S.
- Bats: Right Throws: Right

Barrett Cole Kent (born September 29, 2004) is an American professional baseball pitcher in the Los Angeles Angels organization.

Kent was born in Denison, Texas. He attended high school at Pottsboro High School in Pottsboro, Texas. In June 2020, following his freshman season, Kent committed to play college baseball for the Arkansas Razorbacks. In his 2021 sophomore season, he went 3-2 with a 2.33 ERA, 53 strikeouts and a save in 27 innings pitched while slashing .430/.509/.763 with 5 home runs, 23 RBIs and 25 runs as a first baseman. Following the season, he was named to the 11-3A All-District First Team as a 1B and pitcher. In his 2022 junior season, he was went 10-3 with a 1.97 ERA, a 0.992 WHIP, a save and 110 strikeouts in 68.1 innings pitched. At the plate, he slashed .382/.507/.725 with 7 home runs, 42 RBIs and 40 runs. Following the season, he was named the 11-3A MVP. On November 10, 2022, he signed his National Letter of Intent to play for Arkansas.

Kent was drafted by the Los Angeles Angels in the eighth round of the 2023 Major League Baseball draft, the 234th overall selection. He signed with the team for a $1 million bonus, forgoing his commitment to play college baseball for Arkansas. In his first professional season, Kent pitched two games of relief for the Rookie-level Arizona Complex League Angels and made one start for the Low-A Inland Empire 66ers of the California League, totaling 8 2/3 innings with no runs surrendered and ten strikeouts.

Kent spent 2024 with the Single-A, recording a 6.21 ERA, 1.53 WHIP and 125 strikeouts in 113 innings. In 2025, he was placed on the 60-day injured list with an undisclosed injury. He was activated on July and completed a rehab assignment in the Arizona Complex League Angels, before returning to Single-A.

- Career statistics from Baseball Reference (Minors)

=== Joswa Lugo ===
Joswa Lugo

Los Angeles Angels
- Shortstop
- Born: January 24, 2007 (age 19); Baní, Dominican Republic
- Bats: Right Throws: Right

Joswa Enmanuel Lugo (born January 24, 2007) is a Dominican professional baseball shortstop in the Los Angeles Angels organization.

Lugo signed with the Los Angeles Angels organization in January 2024 for $2.3 million bonus. He made his professional debut that year with the Rookie-Level Dominican Summer League Angels. He slashed .301/.370/.466 with 5 home runs and 18 stolen bases in 53 games at DSL Angels, being named to the DSL AL Mid-Season All-Star team.

In the beginning of 2025, Lugo was selected by MLB.com as the top international prospect in the Angels' organization. He spent 2025 with the Rookie-Level Arizona Complex League Angels, slashing .271/.375/.372 with 2 home runs, 7 doubles and 23 RBIs in 35 games.

Lugo is the younger brother of Dawel Lugo, who previously played in Major League Baseball.

- Career statistics from Baseball Reference (Minors)

=== Lucas Mahlstedt ===
Lucas Mahlstedt

Los Angeles Angels
- Pitcher
- Born: March 26, 2003 (age 23); Miami, Florida, U.S.
- Bats: Right Throws: Right

Lucas Albert Mahlstedt (born March 26, 2003) is an American professional baseball pitcher in the Los Angeles Angels organization.

Mahlstedt attended Spruce Creek High School. As a senior, he made 17 appearances and recorded a 0.40 ERA with 34 strikeouts in 35.1 innings, to be named to the All-Area First Team.

Mahlstedt played college baseball first two seasons at Wofford College. In his 2023 season, he pitched in 27 games as a relief pitcher, posting a 7-2 record with a 2.69 ERA, 68 strikeouts and six saves in 83.2 innings pitched, to be named to All-Southern Conference First Team. He committed to Clemson University for his 2024 and 2025 seasons. In 2025, he made his appearances as a relief pitcher, recording a 4-1 with a 3.00 ERA, 61 strikeouts and 15 saves in 48 innings. Following the season, he was named a finalist for the NCBWA Stopper of the Year Award, and a semifinalist for the Dick Howser Trophy and National Pitcher of the Year Award. Also, he was named to the 2025 All-ACC First Team, and was named a First Team All-American by NCBWA and Perfect Game. He was a physics major at Clemson, being named the 2025 Atlantic Coast Conference Scholar-Athlete of the Year for baseball.

The Los Angeles Angels drafted Mahlstedt in the seventh round of the 2025 Major League Baseball draft, the 199th overall selection. He signed with the team for a $47,500 bonus.

Mahlstedt made his professional debut in 2026 with the High-A Tri-City Dust Devils, and was promoted to the Double-A Rocket City Trash Pandas on April 13. On August 27, he pitched the eighth inning of a combined no-hitter against the Birmingham Barons along with Austin Gordon and Camden Minacci, making it the third no-hitter in Rocket City Trash Pandas history.

- Career statistics from Baseball Reference (Minors)
- Clemson Tigers bio

=== Mason McGwire ===
Mason McGwire

Los Angeles Angels
- Pitcher
- Born: January 5, 2004 (age 22); Irvine, California, U.S.
- Bats: Right Throws: Right

Mason David McGwire (born January 5, 2004) is an American professional baseball pitcher for the Los Angeles Angels organization.

McGwire attended Capistrano Valley High School in Mission Viejo, California. The Chicago Cubs selected McGwire in the eighth round of the 2022 MLB draft. He missed the 2025 season due to injury and began the 2026 season with the Myrtle Beach.

On August 3, 2026, the Cubs traded McGwire and Moisés Ballesteros to the Los Angeles Angels in exchange for Ryan Zeferjahn.

McGwire's father, Mark McGwire, played in Major League Baseball.

- Career statistics from Baseball Reference (Minors)

=== Camden Minacci ===
Camden Minacci

Los Angeles Angels
- Pitcher
- Born: January 14, 2002 (age 24); Orlando, Florida, U.S.
- Bats: Left Throws: Right

Camden David Minacci (born January 14, 2002) is an American professional baseball pitcher in the Los Angeles Angels organization.

Minacci attended Jesuit High School in Tampa, Florida. In 2019, he posted a 12-1 record with a 1.12 ERA and 85 strikeouts in 62 innings pitched as a junior, to be named Florida Dairy Farmers Class 6A Player of the Year. In 2020, he posted a 3-0 record with a 0.64 ERA and 23 strikeouts in 11 innings pitched before COVID-19 ended the season.

Minacci played college baseball at Wake Forest University. In 2022, he posted 2 wins with 6 saves, a 2.18 ERA and 59 strikeouts in 45.1 innings pitched as a sophomore, and played collegiate summer baseball with the Falmouth Commodores of the Cape Cod Baseball League. In 2023, he earned 13 saves with a 2.78 ERA and 46 strikeouts in 32.1 innings as a junior. He was named as a finalist for the NBCWA Stopper of the Year Award, and also named NCBWA All-American Second Team as a relief pitcher.

At the MLB 2023 draft class, Minacci was considered one of the best closers in college baseball. The Los Angeles Angels drafted him in the 6th round of the 2023 Major League Baseball draft, the 174th overall selection. He signed with the team for a $328,500 bonus. He made his professional debut that year with Single-A Inland Empire 66ers.

Minacci split the 2024 season between High-A Tri-City Dust Devils and Double-A Rocket City Trash Pandas, recording a 3-6 with a 3.31 ERA in 45 games. He earned 18 saves in 25 opportunities, allowing 18 runs in 49 innings. He spent the whole 2025 season with Double-A, posting a 4.60 ERA and 59 strikeouts in 60.2 innings pitched. He returned to the Double-A for his 2026 season. On August 27, he pitched the final inning of a combined no-hitter against the Birmingham Barons along with Austin Gordon and Lucas Mahlstedt, making it the third no-hitter in Rocket City Trash Pandas history. He pitched 47.2 innings to post a 3.59 ERA and 61 strikeouts.

Minacci played for Team Italy in 2026 World Baseball Classic.

Minacci is a devout Catholic. His family was Methodist when he entered the high school, but he converted to Catholicism at the end of his sophomore year.

- Career statistics from Baseball Reference (Minors)

=== Xavier Mitchell ===
Xavier Mitchell

Los Angeles Angels
- Pitcher
- Born: July 13, 2006 (age 20); Garland, Texas, U.S.
- Bats: Left Throws: Left

Robert Xavier Mitchell (born July 13, 2006) is an American professional baseball pitcher in the Los Angeles Angels organization.

Mitchell attended Prestonwood Christian Academy in Plano, Texas. As a junior in 2024, he went a 9-0 record with a 1.32 ERA and 97 strikeouts in 53 innings pitched, being named to the TAPPS All-State First-Team. Also he won a gold medal as a member of USA Baseball’s national team at the WBSC U-18 Baseball World Cup Americas Qualifier in 2024. As a senior in 2025, he only pitched 17.0 innings, but posted a 1.24 ERA with 27 strikeouts, allowing 3 hits across his 5 appearances.

The Los Angeles Angels drafted Mitchell in the 13th round of the 2025 Major League Baseball draft, the 379th overall selection. He had the commitment to play college baseball at University of Texas at Austin, but he signed with the team for a $872,500 bonus, going beyond the assigned slot value of $150,000 for the pick.

Mitchell made his professional debut 2026 with the Rookie-Level Arizona Complex League Angels.

- Career statistics from Baseball Reference (Minors)

=== Jake Munroe ===
Jake Munroe

Los Angeles Angels
- Third baseman
- Born: September 14, 2003 (age 23); Urbana, Illinois, U.S.
- Bats: Right Throws: Right

Jake Munroe (born September 14, 2003) is an American professional baseball third baseman in the Los Angeles Angels organization.

Munroe attended Champaign Central High School in Champaign, Illinois, and played college baseball in 2023 and 2024 at John A. Logan College. As a true freshman in his 2023 season, he slashed .339/.466/.661 with 12 home runs, 54 RBI and eight stolen bases. In his 2024 sophomore season, he slashed .415/.510/.881 with 23 home runs and 81 RBI to be named the GRAC Player of the Year. After his sophomore year, he transferred to the University of Louisville. In his lone season at Louisville in 2025, he started 66 games and had a .346 batting average with 13 home runs and 61 RBI. He was also named to the College World Series All-Tournament Team after hitting .357 with one home run across 17 at-bats.

Munroe was selected by the Los Angeles Angels in the fourth round of the 2025 Major League Baseball draft. He made his professional debut after signing with the Single-A Inland Empire 66ers and batted .244 across 12 games played.

Munroe opened the 2026 season with the High-A Tri-City Dust Devils. In June, he was promoted to the Double-A Rocket City Trash Pandas. Across 118 games between the two teams, Munroe batted .289 with 19 home runs, 62 RBI, and 30 doubles. He was named the 2026 Minor League Player Of The Year for the Angels by Baseball America. After the season, he was assigned to play in the Arizona Fall League with the Mesa Solar Sox.

- Career statistics from Baseball Reference (Minors)
- Louisville Cardinals bio

=== Nicolò Pinazzi ===
Nicolò Pinazzi

Los Angeles Angels
- Pitcher
- Born: October 25, 1999 (age 27); Milan, Italy
- Bats: Left Throws: Left

Nicolò Pinazzi (born October 25, 19999) is an Italian professional baseball pitcher for the Los Angeles Angels of Major League Baseball (MLB).

Pinazzi signed with the Cincinnati Reds in August 2020 and played in their organization until 2023. He played 2024 and 2025 playing in the Pioneer Baseball League and American Association of Professional Baseball.

Pinazzi signed with the Los Angeles Angels in December 2025. On October 30, 2026, the Angels added him to the 40-man roster.

- Career statistics from Baseball Reference (Minors)

=== Nelson Rada ===
Nelson Rada

Los Angeles Angels
- Outfielder
- Born: August 24, 2005 (age 21); Valencia, Venezuela
- Bats: Left Throws: Left

Nelson Gabriel Rada (born August 24, 2005) is a Venezuelan professional baseball outfielder in the Los Angeles Angels organization.

Rada was considered as one of the top prospects in 2022 international class, ranking No. 29 on MLB.com. He signed with the Los Angeles Angels organization for $1.85 million. He made his professional debut that year with the Rookie-Level Dominican Summer League Angels and slashed .311/.446/.439, being named to the DSL AL Mid-Season All-Star team. After the season, he was named Angels 2022 Organization All-Stars.

Rada spent the whole 2023 season with the Single-A Inland Empire 66ers. He slashed .276/.395/.346 with 2 home runs, 13 doubles, 6 triples, 48 RBIs and 55 stolen bases in 115 games. After the season, he was named Angels 2023 Minor League Player of the Year by Baseball America, and was named 2023’s MiLB Gold Glove winners as an outfielder. Also he was named Angels 2023 Organization All-Stars for the second straight year.

In 2024, Rada played full season with the Double-A Rocket City Trash Pandas, skipping over High-A class. He hit .234/.331/.269 with 35 stolen bases. He started the 2025 season with the Double-A and slashed .277/.380/.332 with a home run, 13 doubles, 34 stolen bases and 22 RBIs in 93 games. He was promoted to Triple-A Salt Lake Bees on August 2. In 135 games between the two levels, he had a combined slash line of .292/.398/.360 with 2 home runs, 19 doubles, 39 RBIs and 54 stolen bases. He spent the whole 2026 season with the Triple-A, hitting .278 with three home runs, 22 doubles, five triples and 43 stolen bases.

On November 17, 2026, the Angels added Rada to the 40-man roster to protect him from the Rule 5 draft.

- Career statistics from Baseball Reference (Minors)

=== Lucas Ramirez ===
Lucas Ramirez

Los Angeles Angels
- Outfielder
- Born: January 16, 2006 (age 20); Weston, Florida, U.S.
- Bats: Left Throws: Right

Lucas Monteiro Ramirez (born January 16, 2006) is an American professional baseball outfielder in the Los Angeles Angels organization.

Ramirez attended American Heritage High School in Plantation, Florida. In 2023-2024 season, he batted .308 with 4 home runs, 10 doubles and 22 RBIs in 32 games as a senior. He spent 3 years at American Heritage HS, hitting .288 in 83 games. He spent the 2024 with the Victoria Harbour Cats in the West Coast League, slashing .290/.425/.323 with 9 hits, a double and 3 RBIs in 40 plate appearances.

The Los Angeles Angels drafted Ramirez in the 17th round of the 2024 Major League Baseball draft, the 502nd overall selection. He had the commitment to play college baseball at University of Tennessee, but he signed with the team for a $150,000 bonus.

In 2025, Ramirez made his professional debut with the Rookie-Level Arizona Complex league Angels. He slashed .282/.374/.454 with 3 home runs and 7 doubles in 49 games. On August, he was promoted to High-A Tri-City Dust Devils, skipping over Single-A class.

Ramirez is the youngest of 3 sons of Manny Ramirez, who was an 12-time All-Star recording 555 Major League home runs. His mother, Juliana, is Brazilian.

Ramirez played for Team Brazil in 2026 World Baseball Classic, being one of the youngest players in the team. On March 6, he hit 2 home runs against Team USA, becoming the youngest player with a multi-home run game in the WBC and the second-youngest player to hit his first WBC home run.

- Career statistics from Baseball Reference (Minors)

=== Nick Rodriguez ===
Nick Rodriguez

Los Angeles Angels
- Second baseman
- Born: October 29, 2002 (age 24); Tampa, Florida, U.S.
- Bats: Left Throws: Right

Nicolas James Rodriguez (born October 29, 2002) is an American professional baseball second baseman in the Los Angeles Angels organization.

Rodriguez attended Jesuit High School at Tampa, Florida, and played college baseball at Charleston Southern University in his freshman season of 2022. He slashed .384/.489/.493 with 18 RBIs, being named to the 2022 Collegiate Baseball Freshman All-American Team as a shortstop. He committed to Missouri State University for 2023-2025 seasons. He hit .291 with 7 home runs, 35 RBIs and 49 runs scored as a Sophomore in 2023. He slashed .332/.432/.582 with 14 home runs and 48 RBIs in 57 games as a junior in 2024, to be named All-MVC First Team selection and the A.E. "Ted" Willis Most Valuable Player as team's top player. In 2024, he played collegiate summer baseball with the Cotuit Kettleers of the Cape Cod Baseball League. In 2025, He slashed .368/.444/.702 with 18 home runs, 22 doubles and 56 RBIs in 55 games, being named the Missouri Valley Conference Player of the Year and an All-America First-Team selection.

The Los Angeles Angels drafted Rodriguez in the 10th round of the 2025 Major League Baseball draft, the 289th overall selection. He made his professional debut with Single-A Inland Empire 66ers, slashing .281/.396/.371 with a home run and 13 RBIs in 27 games.

Rodriguez Started 2026 with the Double-A Rocket City Trash Pandas.

- Career statistics from Baseball Reference (Minors)

=== Raudi Rodriguez ===
Raudi Rodriguez

Los Angeles Angels
- Outfielder
- Born: July 7, 2003 (age 23); San Pedro de Macorís, Dominican Republic
- Bats: Right Throws: Right

Eric Raudi Rodriguez (born July 7, 2003) is a Dominican professional baseball outfielder in the Los Angeles Angels organization.

Rodriguez was born in the Dominican Republic, and moved to the United states and attended Georgia Premier Academy in Statesboro, Georgia. The Los Angeles Angels drafted Rodriguez in the 19th round of the 2023 Major League Baseball draft, the 564th overall selection. He made his professional debut in 2023 with the Rookie-Level Arizona Complex League Angels, and spent 2024 with the ACL Angels again. He slashed .274/.361/.355 in 41 games during 2 seasons at ACL Angels.

In 2025, Rodriguez played full season with Single-A Inland Empire 66ers. He was named California League Player of the Month for April, slashing .329/.429/.579. In August, he was named Player of the Month again, slashing .434/.529/.646, leading the league in average, hits, total bases, on-base percentage, slugging percentage and OPS. He finished the season having a slash line of .281/.372/.470 with 14 home runs and 38 stolen bases. After the 2025 season, he was named Angels 2025 Minor League Player Of The Year by Baseball America, and played in 2025 Arizona Fall League for the Salt River Rafters. He was selected for Arizona Fall League Fall Stars Game, finishing with 2 hits and 2 RBIs to become the first Angels player to win game's MVP. In AFL, he slashed .433/.514/.650 and was named to the All-Arizona Fall League Team as an outfielder.

Rodriguez started the 2026 season with the Double-A Rocket City Trash Pandas, skipping over High-A class. On August 4, 2026, he was promoted to the Triple-A Salt Lake Bees after slashing .262/.374/.417 with 12 home runs. Between the two levels, he slashed .264/.374/.410.

On November 17, 2026, the Angels added Rodriguez to the 40-man roster to protect him from the Rule 5 draft.

- Career statistics from Baseball Reference (Minors)

=== Johnny Slawinski ===
Johnny Slawinski

Los Angeles Angels
- Pitcher
- Born: February 26, 2007 (age 19); San Antonio, Texas, U.S.
- Bats: Left Throws: Left

Johnny Wayne Slawinski (born February 26, 2007) is an American professional baseball pitcher in the Los Angeles Angels organization.

Slawinski attended Lyndon B. Johnson High School in Texas. He also played football, basketball, and track and field in high school. In 2024, he was named the 17u WWBA MVP pitcher and invited to the 2024 Prep Baseball All-American Game as one of the nation's top prospects. In 2025, he was named the 2025 Prep Baseball Texas Player of the Year with 0.37 ERA, 0.49 WHIP, and 177 strikeouts in 74 innings. He also played as an outfielder, hitting .478 with 13 homers and 42 RBIs and a 1.684 OPS.

The Los Angeles Angels drafted Slawinski in the 3rd round of the 2025 Major League Baseball draft, the 79th overall selection. He became a first baseball player to be drafted in MLB draft from Johnson City. On July 18, he signed with the team for a $2.49 million bonus.

Slawinski made his professional debut in 2026 with Rookie-Level Arizona Complex League Angels. In May, he won Arizona Complex League Pitcher of the Month Award, recording 2-2 with a 2.45 ERA, 31 strikeouts, 6 earned runs and a 0.82 WHIP over 22 innings in 5 starts. He pitched 54.0 innings for the ACL Angels, posting a 3.33 ERA with 82 strikeouts.

- Career statistics from Baseball Reference (Minors)

=== Nate Snead ===
Nate Snead

Los Angeles Angels
- Pitcher
- Born: March 16, 2004 (age 22); Menomonee Falls, Wisconsin, U.S.
- Bats: Right Throws: Right

Career highlights and awards
- College World Series champion (2024)

Nathaniel James Snead (born March 16, 2004) is an American professional baseball pitcher in the Los Angeles Angels organization.

Snead attended South Milwaukee High School in South Milwaukee, Wisconsin, graduating in 2022. He played his freshman season of college baseball in 2023 at Wichita State University for the Wichita State Shockers and had a 1–2 record, a 3.16 ERA, and 53 strikeouts over 42 2/3 innings. After his freshman year, he transferred to the University of Tennessee and played two season with the Tennessee Volunteers. He had a 10–2 record, a 3.11 ERA, 61 strikeouts and six saves across 75 1/3 innings for the Volunteers in 2024, helping them win the 2024 Men's College World Series. Snead had a 4–2 record and 4.53 ERA over 49 2/3 innings pitched for Tennessee in 2025. After the 2025 season, he attended the 2025 MLB Draft Combine at Chase Field.

Snead was selected by the Los Angeles Angels in the third round with the 105th overall pick of the 2025 Major League Baseball draft. He signed with the team for $597,500, nearly $150,000 under slot value.

Snead made his professional debut in 2026 with the High-A Tri-City Dust Devils. In May, he was promoted to the Double-A Rocket City Trash Pandas. Across 23 starts between both teams, Snead had a 6–8 record, a 4.30 ERA, and 89 strikeouts over 104 2/3 innings.

- Career statistics from Baseball Reference (Minors)
- Tennessee Volunteers bio

=== Ubaldo Soto ===
Ubaldo Soto

Los Angeles Angels
- Pitcher
- Born: July 12, 2006 (age 20); Sabana Larga, Dominican Republic
- Bats: Right Throws: Right

Ubaldo Nayib Soto (born July 12, 2006) is a Dominican professional baseball pitcher in the Los Angeles Angels organization.

Soto signed with the Los Angeles Angels organization in January 2023 for a 250,000 bonus. He made his professional debut that year with the Rookie-Level Dominican Summer League Angels, recording a 4-1 with a 1.64 ERA and 42 strikeouts in 44.0 innings pitched. In 2024, Soto played with the DSL Angels again. He posted a 1.29 ERA and 1.09 WHIP, allowing runs in 5 games of his 12 starts, ending the regular season with a 20-inning scoreless streak. After the season, he was named DSL Pitcher of the Year and DSL All-Stars as a starting pitcher.

Soto started 2025 with Rookie-Level Arizona Complex League Angels.

- Career statistics from Baseball Reference (Minors)

=== Jared Southard ===
Jared Southard

Los Angeles Angels
- Pitcher
- Born: October 4, 2000 (age 26); Austin, Texas, U.S.
- Bats: Right Throws: Right

Jared Rhett Southard (born October 4, 2000) is an American professional baseball pitcher in the Los Angeles Angels organization.

Southard attended Rouse High School in Texas. As a senior in 2019, he posted 100 strikeouts in 55 innings, winning District MVP and being named to the All-State team. He was drafted in the 20th round by the Los Angeles Angels, in the 2019 Major League Baseball draft, but did not sign and fulfilled his commitment to play college baseball at the University of Texas at Austin. In 2021, he played collegiate summer baseball with the Orleans Firebirds of the Cape Cod Baseball League. In 2022 season as a junior, he recorded a 4-1 with a 2.76 ERA and 46 strikeouts in 29.1 innings as a relief. He finished three seasons at Texas with a 2.38 ERA and 68 strikeouts in 41.2 innings.

The Los Angeles Angels drafted Southard again, in the 12th round of the 2022 Major League Baseball draft, the 358th overall selection. He signed with the team for a $137,500 bonus. He made his professional debut that year with Single-A Inland Empire 66ers. He split 2023 between Single-A and High-A Tri-City Dust Devils. He split 2024 between High-A and Double-A Rocket City Trash Pandas. He started 2025 with Double-A, went 2-2 with a 2.93 ERA, five saves and 28 strikeouts to eight walks in 27.2 innings pitched across 22 games as a relief, to be promoted to Triple-A Salt Lake Bees in June. He made 27 appearances at Triple-A, posting a 4.23 ERA with three holds, two saves and 42 strikeouts in 38.1 innings pitched.

- Career statistics from Baseball Reference (Minors)

=== Najer Victor ===
Najer Victor

Los Angeles Angels
- Pitcher
- Born: November 28, 2001 (age 24); Philadelphia, Pennsylvania, U.S.
- Bats: Right Throws: Right

Najer A. Victor (born November 28, 2001) is an American professional baseball pitcher for the Los Angeles Angels of Major League Baseball (MLB). He was named to the Great Britain national baseball team for the 2026 World Baseball Classic.

Victor grew up in Saint Thomas in the U.S. Virgin Islands. He attended and played baseball at East Ridge High School in Clermont, Florida.

Victor committed to Florida Gulf Coast University for college baseball in 2020. In 2022, Victor pitched in 10 games, with a 4-0 record and a 2.89 ERA. He transferred to the University of Central Florida for the 2023 season.

Victor was drafted by the Los Angeles Angels in the 14th round of the 2024 MLB draft.

Victor played for the Great Britain national baseball team in the 2026 World Baseball Classic. In a game against the United States national baseball team, Victor struck out former MVPs Aaron Judge and Bryce Harper, along with USA starters Gunnar Henderson and Roman Anthony.

- Career statistics from Baseball Reference (Minors)

== Full Triple-A to Rookie League rosters ==
=== Triple-A ===
Salt Lake Bees roster
Players		Coaches/Other
Pitchers: 7 Sam Bachman *; 52 Brady Choban; 25 Ryan Costeiu; 49 Mason Erla; 12 Leonard Garcia; 18 Joel Hurtado; -- Sammy Peralta; -- Hayden Seig; 33 Jared Southard; 1 Najer Victor	Catchers: 1 Gustavo Campero *; 16 Zach Humphreys; Infielders: 41 Ben Gobbel; 24 Niko Kavadas; 26 Nolan Schanuel *; Outfielders	Manager: 23 Doug Davis; Coaches: 40 Andy Hawkins (assistant pitching); 11 Shane Loux (pitching); 30 Alonzo Powell (hitting); 27 Jack Santora; 7-day injured list; * On Los Angeles Angels 40-man roster; ~ Development list; # Rehab assignment; ∞ Reserve list; ‡ Restricted list; § Suspended list; † Temporarily inactive list; Roster updated November 17, 2026; Transactions; → More rosters: MiLB • Pacific Coast League; → Los Angeles Angels minor league players

=== Double-A ===
Rocket City Trash Pandas roster
Players		Coaches/Other
Pitchers: 36 Tyler Bremner; 57 Derek Clark; 49 Chris Cortez; 35 Carlos Espinosa; 52 Austin Gordon; 46 Lucas Mahlstedt; 23 Camden Minacci; 29 Bryce Osmond; 25 Dylan Phillips; 50 Eybersson Polanco; 53 Kyle Robinson; 45 Nate Snead; 27 Kenyon Yovan	Catchers: 30 Caleb Bartolero; 28 Jacob Cozart; 7 Juan Flores; Infielders: 19 Cole Fontenelle; -- Kendrey Maduro; 2 Mac McCroskey; 29 Jake Munroe; 3 Arjun Nimmala; 11 Nick Rodriguez; Outfielders: 8 Randy De Jesus; 22 Tucker Flint; 32 Eddie Micheletti Jr.; 10 Anthony Scull; 31 Jake Thompson	Manager: 13 Joe Kruzel; Coaches: 43 Daren Brown (coach); 48 Doug Henry (pitching); 12 Tony Jaramillo (hitting); 21 Tim Leveque ( pitching); 7-day injured list; * On Los Angeles Angels 40-man roster; ~ Development list; # Rehab assignment; ∞ Reserve list; ‡ Restricted list; § Suspended list; † Temporarily inactive list; Roster updated November 2, 2026; Transactions; → More rosters: MiLB • Southern League; → Los Angeles Angels minor league players

=== High-A ===
Tri-City Dust Devils roster
Players		Coaches/Other
Pitchers: 16 Luke Cooper; 10 Dylan Jordan; 3 Keythel Key; 40 Fulton Lockhart; 35 Mason McGwire; 46 Peyton Olejnik; 22 Zachary Redner; 20 Kyle Roche; 21 Chase Shores; 15 Brady Stuart; 37 Francis Texido; 26 Benny Thompson; 32 Sam Tookoian; 30 Yeferson Vargas; 3 Jarren Warwick	Catchers: 12 Peter Burns; 31 Dario Laverde; 25 Alberto Rios; Infielders: 27 Slate Alford; 8 Harold Coll; 6 David Mershon; 28 Ryan Nicholson; 4 Capri Ortiz; 51 Ryland Zaborowski; Outfielders: 5 Hayden Alvarez; 14 Kevyn Castillo; -- Rio Foster; 9 Gage Harrelson; 24 Jonny McGill; 7 Jorge Ruiz	Manager: 11 Dann Bilardello; Coaches: 35 Ty Hawkins (hitting); 33 Glendon Rusch (pitching); 50 Brian Rupp (coach); 7-day injured list; * On Los Angeles Angels 40-man roster; ~ Development list; # Rehab assignment; ∞ Reserve list; ‡ Restricted list; § Suspended list; † Temporarily inactive list; Roster updated November 2, 2026; Transactions; → More rosters: MiLB • Northwest League; → Los Angeles Angels minor league players

=== Single-A ===
Rancho Cucamonga Quakes roster
Players		Coaches/Other
Pitchers: 21 Jhon Almonte; 16 Mikey Cascino; 14 Andres Cova; 25 Alton Davis II; 44 Victor Garcia; 38 C. J. Gray; 24 Trey Gregory-Alford; 12 Jakob Guardado; 46 Talon Haley; -- Barrett Kent; -- Jesus Martinez; 48 Yokelvin Reyes; 27 Angel Rivero; 18 Angelo Smith; 32 Ubaldo Soto; 39 Marco Vega; 52 Brayan Vergara	Catchers: 28 Gabriel Davalillo; 16 Kaden Hopson; 13 Jonathan Linares; 56 Marlon Quintero; Infielders: 2 Angel Arredondo; 23 Gavin Grahovac; 10 Joswa Lugo; 54 Anyelo Marquez; 3 Jaxon Willits; 49 John Wimmer; Outfielders: 17 Samil Dishmey; 4 TJ Ford; 6 Jeffery Heard; 5 Lucas Ramirez	Manager: 22 Dave Stapleton; Coaches: 45 Elmer Dessens (pitching); 15 Raywilly Gomez (hitting); -- Steven Hernandez (coach); 9 Dioner Navarro (coach); 7-day injured list; * On Los Angeles Angels 40-man roster; ~ Development list; # Rehab assignment; ∞ Reserve list; ‡ Restricted list; § Suspended list; † Temporarily inactive list; Roster updated November 2, 2026; Transactions; → More rosters: MiLB • California League; → Los Angeles Angels minor league players

=== Rookie ===
Arizona Complex League Angels roster
Players		Coaches/Other
Pitchers: 77 Rolando Anzola; -- Justin Byrd; 51 Sebastian Caseres; -- Greyson Chappel; 74 Dioris De La Rosa; 82 Fabian Gallardo; -- Will Gervase; -- Trevor Hansen; -- Jayden Harper; -- Ryan Hetzler; 92 Luke LaCourse; -- Tate McGuire; 80 Xavier Mitchell; -- Robert Orloski; 17 Cole Raymond; -- Luc Rising; -- Jacob Sammis; -- Thomas Shurtleff; 55 Johnny Slawinski; -- Fabian Soto; -- Felix Tapia	Catchers: -- Adam Agresti; 57 Josue Demey; 81 Eliezer Rivero; 95 Humberto Tiberi; -- Garrett Wright; Infielders: -- Jarren Advincula; 68 Yojancel Cabrera; 96 Greylin De La Paz; 90 Yilver De Paula; -- TJ Grines; 35 Bryan Martinez; 12 Liordanys Menendez; -- Felix Morrobel; -- Victor Rodriguez; 58 Kason Siguenza; 71 Ivan Tatis; -- Casey Wensley; Outfielders: 60 Byron Castillo; -- Jared Grindlinger; -- Aaron Graeber; -- Jake Jackson; -- Jake Long; -- Rylan Lujo; 23 LeTrey McCollum; -- Jack Salmon; 49 Anthony Santa Cruz de Oviedo	Manager: -- Hainley Statia; Coaches: -- Gil Heredia (pitching); -- Ever Magallanes (coach); -- Eddie Menchaca (hitting); -- Trevor Nyp (performance); -- Ron Villone (pitching); 7-day injured list; * On Los Angeles Angels 40-man roster; ~ Development list; # Rehab assignment; ∞ Reserve list; ‡ Restricted list; § Suspended list; † Temporarily inactive list; Roster updated November 2, 2026; Transactions; → More rosters: MiLB • Arizona Complex League; → Los Angeles Angels minor league players

=== Foreign Rookie ===
Dominican Summer League Angels roster
Players		Coaches/Other
Pitchers: 59 Misael Almanzar; 41 Steuri Amancio; 43 Wilmer Berroteran; 35 Jhostin Betances; 13 Steven Cabrera; 8 Victor De La Cruz; 30 Anderson Encarnacion; 29 Kendri Fana; 48 Alexander Garcia; 58 Anllelo Gutierrez; 57 Freddy Hernandez; 45 Kauriel Leon; 32 Miguel Liendo; 39 Michael Moreno; 23 Starling Reyes; 22 Hollis Watson	Catchers: 4 Yonathan Aro; 99 Diego Avila; 26 Jose Camacho; 16 Diego Rondon; Infielders: 21 Luis Bruno; 10 Juan Cespedes; 1 Jeyson Horton; 7 David Manzueta; 9 Cesar Paredes; 11 Wilker Rosales; Outfielders: 19 Yelinson Betances; 2 Carlos Castillo; 14 Adonanfer Reyes; 40 Anderson Rodriguez; 20 Junior Suriel	Manager: -- Héctor de la Cruz; Coaches: -- Anel De Los Santos (hitting); -- Enrique González (pitching); -- Jose Marte (pitching); -- Berbani Martinez (defensive); -- Danilo Sanchez (catching); 7-day injured list; * On Los Angeles Angels 40-man roster; ~ Development list; # Rehab assignment; ∞ Reserve list; ‡ Restricted list; § Suspended list; † Temporarily inactive list; Roster updated October 21, 2026; Transactions; → More rosters: MiLB • Dominican Summer League; → Los Angeles Angels minor league players

== Player Development Staff ==
The Angels' Player Development staff consists of:

- ASSISTANT GM, PLAYER DEVELOPMENT: Joey Prebynski
- ASSISTANT DIRECTOR, PLAYER DEVELOPMENT: Tony Ferreira
- ASSISTANT, PLAYER DEVELOPMENT: Luis Barranco
- COORDINATOR, ARIZONA OPERATIONS: Tripp Norton
- COORDINATOR, LATIN AMERICAN OPERATIONS: Michael Noboa
- MANAGER, MINOR LEAGUE EQUIPMENT: Louie Raya
- TEMPE CLUBHOUSE ASSISTANTS: Sergio Moncada, Justin Newman, Jon Morley, Andrew West, Dan Ortiz, Jace Phillips
