= 2007 Southern League season =

- League: Southern League
- Sport: Baseball
- Duration: April 5 – September 3
- Number of games: 140
- Number of teams: 10

Regular season
- League champions: Montgomery Biscuits
- Season MVP: Evan Longoria, Montgomery Biscuits

Playoffs
- League champions: Montgomery Biscuits
- Runners-up: Huntsville Stars

SL seasons
- ← 2006 2008 →

The 2007 Southern League was a Class AA baseball season played between April 5 and September 3. Ten teams played a 140-game schedule, with the top team in each division in each half of the season qualifying for the post-season.

The Montgomery Biscuits won the Southern League championship, defeating the Huntsville Stars in the playoffs.

== Team changes ==
- The West Tenn Diamond Jaxx ended their affiliation with the Chicago Cubs and began a new affiliation with the Seattle Mariners.
- The Tennessee Smokies ended their affiliation with the Arizona Diamondbacks and began a new affiliation with the Chicago Cubs.
- The Mobile BayBears ended their affiliation with the San Diego Padres and began a new affiliation with the Arizona Diamondbacks.

== Teams ==
2007 Southern League
| Division | Team | City | MLB Affiliate | Stadium |
| North | Carolina Mudcats | Zebulon, North Carolina | Florida Marlins | Five County Stadium |
| North | Chattanooga Lookouts | Chattanooga, Tennessee | Cincinnati Reds | AT&T Field |
| North | Huntsville Stars | Huntsville, Alabama | Milwaukee Brewers | Joe W. Davis Stadium |
| North | Tennessee Smokies | Sevierville, Tennessee | Chicago Cubs | Smokies Park |
| North | West Tenn Diamond Jaxx | Jackson, Tennessee | Seattle Mariners | Pringles Park |
| South | Birmingham Barons | Birmingham, Alabama | Chicago White Sox | Regions Park |
| South | Jacksonville Suns | Jacksonville, Florida | Los Angeles Dodgers | Baseball Grounds of Jacksonville |
| South | Mississippi Braves | Jackson, Mississippi | Atlanta Braves | Trustmark Park |
| South | Mobile BayBears | Mobile, Alabama | Arizona Diamondbacks | Hank Aaron Stadium |
| South | Montgomery Biscuits | Montgomery, Alabama | Tampa Bay Devil Rays | Montgomery Riverwalk Stadium |

== Map of teams ==
North Division South Division

== Regular season ==
=== Summary ===
- The Montgomery Biscuits finished the season with the best record in the league for the first time since the franchise relocated to Montgomery.

=== Standings ===
North Division
| Team | Win | Loss | % | GB |
|---|---|---|---|---|
| Huntsville Stars | 75 | 62 | .547 | – |
| Tennessee Smokies | 73 | 65 | .529 | 2.5 |
| Chattanooga Lookouts | 67 | 73 | .479 | 9.5 |
| West Tenn Diamond Jaxx | 60 | 79 | .432 | 16 |
| Carolina Mudcats | 60 | 80 | .429 | 16.5 |
South Division
| Montgomery Biscuits | 81 | 59 | .579 | – |
| Jacksonville Suns | 80 | 60 | .571 | 1 |
| Mobile BayBears | 71 | 68 | .511 | 9.5 |
| Mississippi Braves | 67 | 72 | .482 | 13.5 |
| Birmingham Barons | 62 | 78 | .443 | 19 |

== League Leaders ==
=== Batting leaders ===
| Stat | Player | Total |
|---|---|---|
| AVG | Josh Kroeger, Tennessee Smokies | .382 |
| H | Emilio Bonifácio, Mobile BayBears | 157 |
| R | Reid Brignac, Montgomery Biscuits | 91 |
| 2B | Cory Aldridge, Birmingham Barons; Carlos González, Mobile BayBears | 33 |
| 3B | Hernán Iribarren, Huntsville Stars | 12 |
| HR | Brendan Katin, Huntsville Stars | 24 |
| RBI | Brendan Katin, Huntsville Stars | 94 |
| SB | Emilio Bonifácio, Mobile BayBears | 41 |

=== Pitching leaders ===
| Stat | Player | Total |
|---|---|---|
| W | Chris Mason, Montgomery Biscuits | 15 |
| ERA | Chris Mason, Montgomery Biscuits | 2.57 |
| CG | Steve Hammond, Huntsville Stars; Mark Holliman, Tennessee Smokies; Mike Prochaska, Montgomery Biscuits; Greg Smith, Mobile BayBears | 2 |
| SHO | Steve Hammond, Huntsville Stars; Mark Holliman, Tennessee Smokies; Chris Mason, Montgomery Biscuits; Sam Narron, Huntsville Stars; Mike Prochaska, Montgomery Biscuits | 1 |
| SV | Dale Thayer, Montgomery Biscuits | 27 |
| IP | Andrew Baldwin, West Tenn Diamond Jaxx | 166.0 |
| SO | Gio González, Birmingham Barons | 185 |

== Playoffs ==
- The Montgomery Biscuits won their fifth Southern League championship, defeating the Huntsville Stars in five games.

=== Playoff bracket ===
Division finals
N1 | Huntsville | 3
N2 | Tennessee | 2
S1 | Montgomery | 3
S2 | Mississippi | 1

Finals
N1 | Huntsville | 2
S1 | Montgomery | 3

== Awards ==
Southern League awards
| Award name | Recipient |
|---|---|
| Most Valuable Player | Evan Longoria, Montgomery Biscuits |
| Pitcher of the Year | Chris Mason, Montgomery Biscuits |
| Manager of the Year | Don Money, Huntsville Stars |

== See also ==
- 2007 Major League Baseball season
