= David MacKinnon =

American baseball player (born 1994)

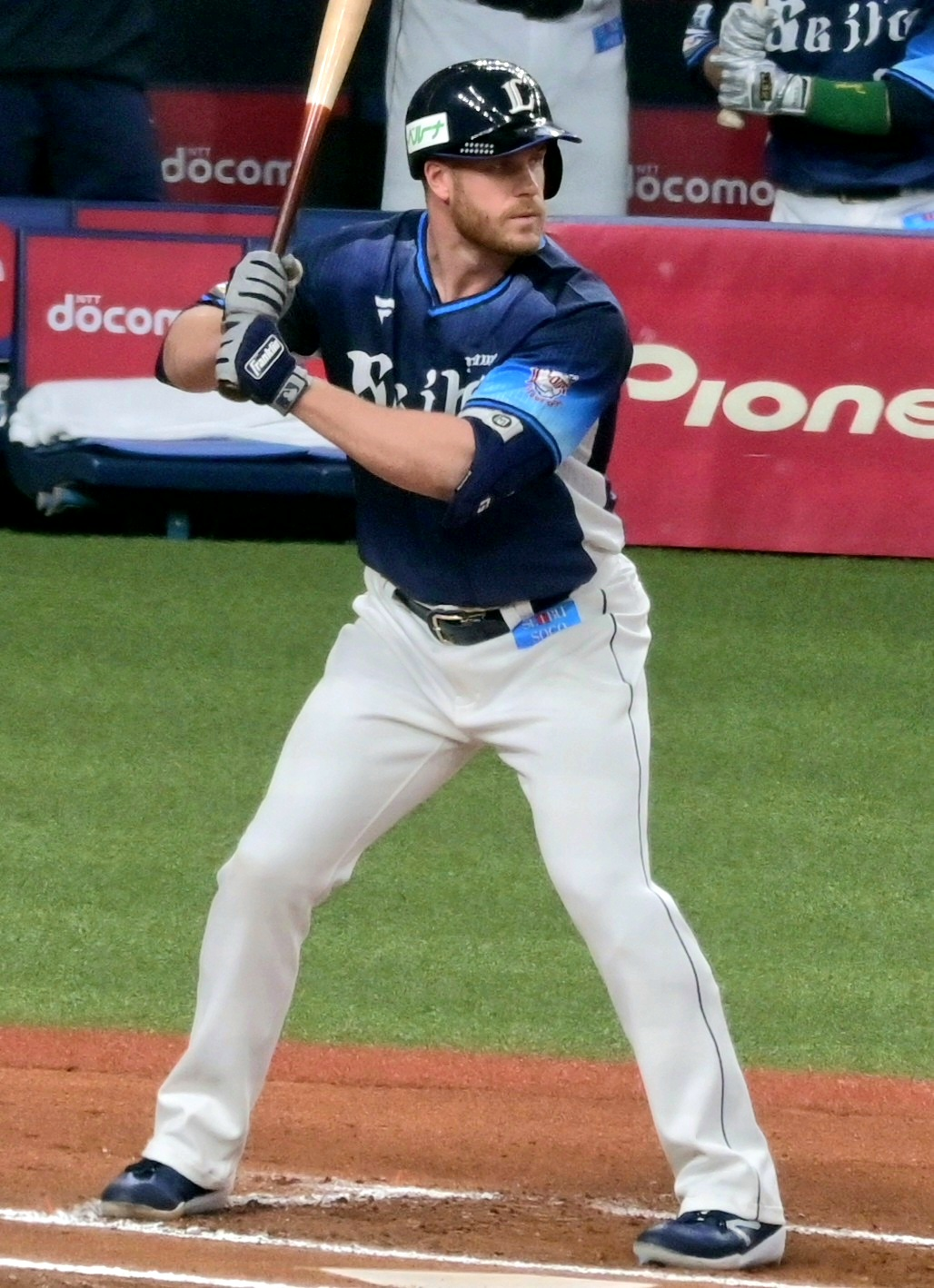
- MacKinnon playing for the Saitama Seibu Lions in 2023
- First baseman
- Born: December 15, 1994 (age 31); Easton, Massachusetts, U.S.
- Batted: Right Threw: Right

Professional debut
- MLB: June 18, 2022, for the Los Angeles Angels
- NPB: March 31, 2023, for the Saitama Seibu Lions
- KBO: March 23, 2024, for the Samsung Lions

Last appearance
- MLB: August 26, 2022, for the Oakland Athletics
- NPB: September 30, 2023, for the Saitama Seibu Lions
- KBO: July 4, 2024, for the Samsung Lions

MLB statistics
- Batting average: .140
- Home runs: 0
- Runs batted in: 6

NPB statistics
- Batting average: .259
- Home runs: 15
- Runs batted in: 50

KBO statistics
- Batting average: .294
- Home runs: 4
- Runs batted in: 36
- Stats at Baseball Reference

Teams
- Los Angeles Angels (2022); Oakland Athletics (2022); Saitama Seibu Lions (2023); Samsung Lions (2024)

Career highlights and awards
- KBO: All-Star (2024)

David C. MacKinnon (born December 15, 1994) is an American former professional baseball first baseman. He played in Major League Baseball (MLB) for the Los Angeles Angels and Oakland Athletics, in Nippon Professional Baseball (NPB) for the Saitama Seibu Lions, and in the KBO League for the Samsung Lions. MacKinnon played college baseball at the University of Hartford and was selected by the Angels in the 32nd round of the 2017 Major League Baseball draft.

== Amateur career ==
MacKinnon attended Oliver Ames High School in Easton, Massachusetts, where he played baseball and soccer.

After graduating high school, MacKinnon enrolled at the University of Hartford where he played both sports for all four years of college. In 2015, he played collegiate summer baseball with the Wareham Gatemen of the Cape Cod Baseball League (CCBL) and was named a league all-star. He returned to the CCBL in 2016 with the Bourne Braves. During his senior baseball season at Hartford in 2017, MacKinnon batted .327 with zero home runs and 18 RBIs over fifty games. After the season, he was selected by the Los Angeles Angels in the 32nd round of the 2017 Major League Baseball draft.

== Professional career ==
=== Los Angeles Angels ===
MacKinnon signed with the Angels and split his first professional season between the Arizona League Angels and Orem Owlz. He played 2018 with the Burlington Bees and Inland Empire 66ers, 2019 with the 66ers, and 2021 with the Rocket City Trash Pandas. With the Trash Pandas in 2021, he earned Double-A South Player of the Month honors in June. He opened the 2022 season with the Salt Lake Bees and earned Pacific Coast League Player of the Month honors in May.

On June 18, 2022, the Angels selected MacKinnon's contract and promoted him to the major leagues. At the time of his promotion, he was batting .327 with 13 home runs over 56 games with Salt Lake. He made his MLB debut that night as the starting first baseman versus the Seattle Mariners and went hitless over two at-bats. He recorded his first major league hit on June 22, an RBI single in the seventh inning against the Kansas City Royals. On August 2, MacKinnon was designated for assignment.

=== Oakland Athletics ===
On August 5, 2022, MacKinnon was claimed off waivers by the Oakland Athletics. He was assigned to the Triple-A Las Vegas Aviators of the Pacific Coast League and initially spent eight games with the team. On August 16, MacKinnon was promoted to the major leagues to replace an injured Ramón Laureano on the roster. In six major league games for Oakland, MacKinnon went 0-for-13. On August 28, he was optioned to Las Vegas. In 16 games for Las Vegas, MacKinnon batted .297 with a home run and nine RBIs. He was non-tendered by the Athletics and became a free agent on November 18.

=== Saitama Seibu Lions ===
On December 19, 2022, MacKinnon signed a one-year, 90 million yen ($684,000) contract with the Saitama Seibu Lions of Nippon Professional Baseball (NPB). He made his NPB debut on March 31, 2023, going 1-for-4. On April 2, MacKinnon hit his first NPB home run, a solo shot off Taisuke Yamaoka of the Orix Buffaloes. In 127 games for the team in 2023, he batted .259/.327/.401 with 15 home runs and 50 RBI.

=== Samsung Lions ===
On December 15, 2023, MacKinnon signed with the Samsung Lions of the KBO League. In 72 games for Samsung in 2024, he batted .294/.381/.386 with four home runs and 36 RBI. MacKinnon was released by the Lions following the signing of Ruben Cardenas on July 10.

== Media ==
MacKinnon co-hosts Pacific Swings, a baseball podcast focused on NPB, the KBO, and international baseball, alongside Dutch journalist and documentary filmmaker Jasper Spanjaart. The podcast aims to connect baseball cultures across North America, Japan, and South Korea through interviews with current and former players.

MacKinnon described the podcast's aim as giving listeners an unfiltered look at professional baseball: "Just kind of trying to show you what baseball players are like, what the baseball locker rooms are like, and give you stories that you will never hear unless it's two baseball players talking."

Episodes have featured former Yomiuri Giants pitcher Tyler Beede, 2024 KBO Home Run King Matt Davidson, and former Seibu teammate Dietrich Enns. MacKinnon has also expressed interest in featuring former Japanese teammates, including Seibu Lions pitcher Kaima Taira, as part of a broader goal to introduce Japanese and Korean players to international audiences.

MacKinnon handles on-air duties and fan engagement, while Spanjaart manages editing and production. "He's unreal at the whole editing process," MacKinnon told The Japan Times. "I'm there for the vibes. I'm there to tell good stories."

== Personal life ==
MacKinnon and his wife, Jordan, had their first child, a son, in March 2022.
