= Dominican Summer League Angels =

- Boca Chica

Minor league affiliations
- Class: Rookie
- League: Dominican Summer League
- Division: Boca Chica North

Major league affiliations
- Team: Los Angeles Angels

Minor league titles
- League titles (1): 2011

Team data
- Name: Angels
- Ballpark: Academia de Abel Garcia
- Owner(s)/ Operator(s): Los Angeles Angels
- Manager: Charlie Romero

The Dominican Summer Angels are a minor league baseball team in the Dominican Summer League. The team plays in the Boca Chica North division and is affiliated with the Los Angeles Angels.

== History ==
The team came into existence in 1989, and has mostly been an independent Angels affiliate ever since. There have been a few exceptions. For the 1991 season, the team shared an affiliation with the Los Angeles Dodgers and San Diego Padres. In 1994, they were a split squad: one independent team and one shared affiliation with the Dodgers. The team shared an affiliation with the Tampa Bay Devil Rays for the 1996 season, then ceased operations for one season in 1997. They resumed operations in 1998, sharing an affiliation with the Chicago White Sox. They have been independently affiliated since 1999.

== Roster ==
Dominican Summer League Angels roster
Players		Coaches/Other
Pitchers: 55 Rolando Anzola; 43 Jhostin Betances; -- Sebastian Caseres; 59 Daniel Colina; 35 Andres Cova; -- Gabe Davis; 41 Dioris De La Rosa; 52 Fabian Gallardo; -- Juan Jordan; 61 Davidxon Lara; -- Kauriel Leon ‡; -- Miguel Liendo; 33 Christopher Montilla; 57 Yokelvin Reyes; -- Javier Rodriguez; 60 Fabian Soto; 37 Ubaldo Soto; -- Felix Tapia; 47 Leudy Tirado; 59 Marco Vega; 40 Brayan Vergara	Catchers: 17 Jose Camacho; -- Gabriel Davalillo; -- Josue Demey; -- Diego Rondon; 2 Marlon Quintero; 13 Humberto Tiberi; Infielders: 22 Optiel Colina; 8 Greylin De La Paz; 7 Joswa Lugo; 3 Anyelo Marquez; 6 Bryan Martinez; 16 Oswaldo Patino; Outfielders: 25 Hayden Alvarez; 27 Byron Castillo; -- Wilberson De Pena; 14 Samil Dishmey; -- Anthony Santa Cruz De Oviedo; 4 Manuel Silva	Manager: Héctor de la Cruz; Coaches: Anel De Los Santos (hitting); Enrique González (pitching); Jose Marte (pitching); Berbani Martinez (defensive); Danilo Sanchez (catching); 7-day injured list * On Los Angeles Angels 40-man roster ~ Development list # Rehab assignment ∞ Reserve list ‡ Restricted list § Suspended list † Temporarily inactive list Roster updated March 19, 2025; Transactions → More rosters: MiLB • Dominican Summer League → Los Angeles Angels minor league players
