= CJ Alexander =

American baseball player (born 1996)

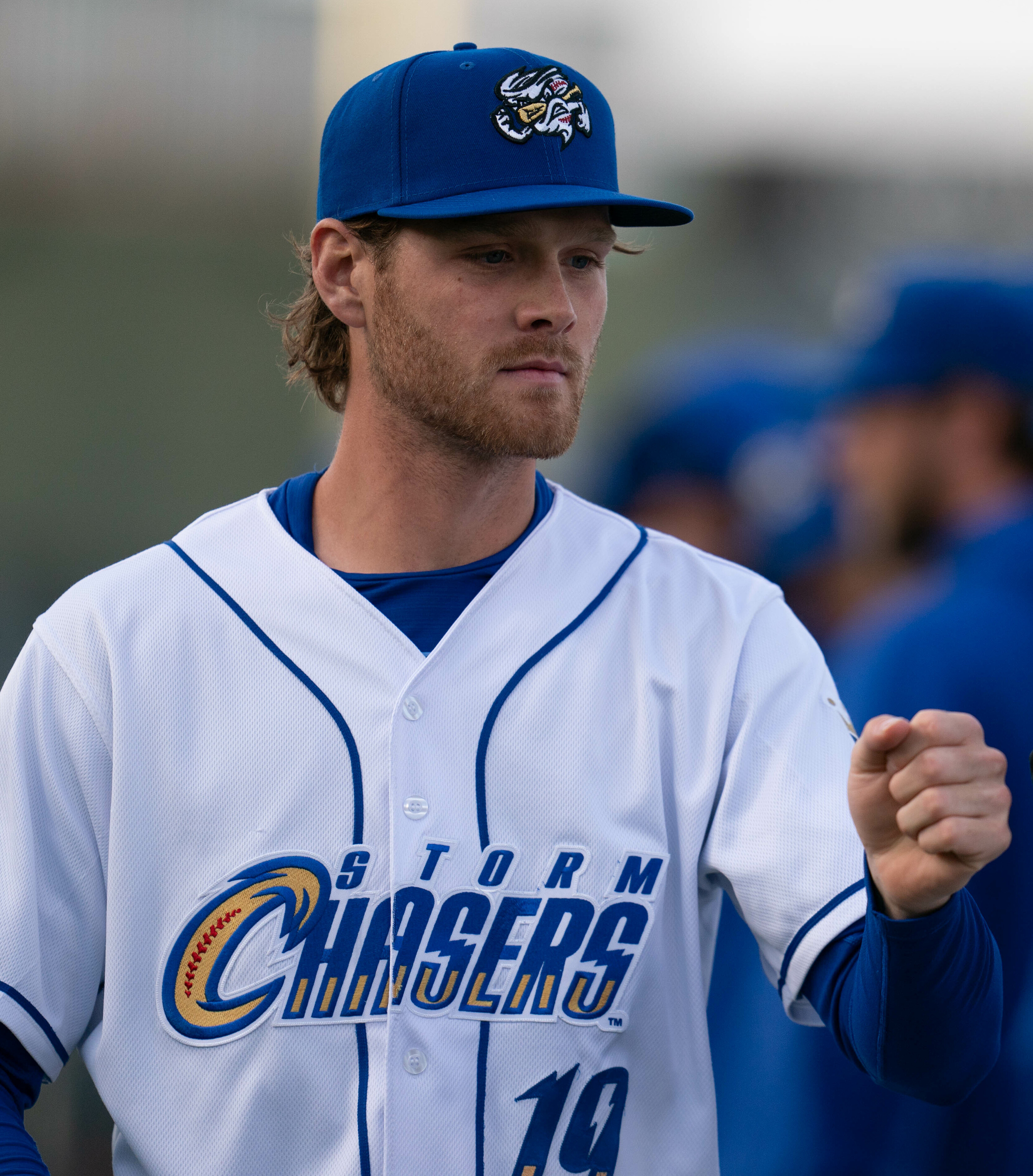
- Alexander with the Omaha Storm Chasers in 2023

Free agent
- Third baseman / First baseman / Outfielder
- Born: July 17, 1996 (age 30); Merrillville, Indiana, U.S.
- Bats: Left Throws: Right

MLB debut
- June 24, 2024, for the Kansas City Royals

MLB statistics (through 2025 season)
- Batting average: .160
- Home runs: 0
- Runs batted in: 0
- Stats at Baseball Reference

Teams
- Kansas City Royals (2024); Athletics (2025)

Charles Joseph Wesley Alexander (born July 17, 1996) is an American professional baseball third baseman, first baseman, and outfielder who is a free agent. He has previously played in Major League Baseball (MLB) for the Kansas City Royals and Athletics.

== Amateur career ==
Alexander attended Bishop Verot High School in Fort Myers, Florida. He signed a National Letter of Intent with Ball State University to play college baseball for the Ball State Cardinals. He transferred to the State College of Florida, Manatee–Sarasota before committing to transfer to the University of Central Florida.

== Professional career ==
=== Atlanta Braves ===
The Atlanta Braves drafted Alexander in the 20th round, with the 592nd overall selection, of the 2018 Major League Baseball draft. After being drafted, Alexander played for the rookie-level Florida Complex League Braves and Danville Braves, as well as the High-A Florida Fire Frogs. In 52 total games in the Braves farm system during 2018, Alexander had a batting average of .352 with 69 hits, 27 runs batted in (RBI) and four stolen bases. After beginning 2019 with the Fire Frogs, Alexander was promoted to Atlanta's Double-A affiliate, the Mississippi Braves. After having a promising start to his professional career in 2018, Alexander regressed in 2019, with a dismal batting average of .117 to go along with only 15 hits, two home runs, eight RBI, and three stolen bases in 43 total games (19 with the Fire Frogs, 24 with the Mississippi Braves).

Alexander did not play in a game in 2020 due to the cancellation of the minor league season because of the COVID-19 pandemic. Alexander played in 87 games in 2021, all with the Mississippi Braves, and has a slash line of .197/.258/.378 with 60 hits, 10 home runs, 31 RBI and 14 stolen bases.

=== Kansas City Royals ===
On July 11, 2022, the Braves traded Alexander, Drew Waters, and Andrew Hoffmann to the Kansas City Royals in exchange for the 35th overall selection of the 2022 MLB draft. Alexander played 114 total games in 2022; 68 with the Mississippi Braves before being traded to Kansas City, and 46 games for the Royals' Double-A affiliate, the Northwest Arkansas Naturals. Overall, he improved, batting .264/.302/.477 with 120 hits, 25 home runs, 87 RBI and 19 stolen bases. In 2023, Alexander played 92 total games; six with the rookie–level Arizona Complex League Royals and 86 with the Triple–A Omaha Storm Chasers, batting .231/.304/.469 with 70 hits, 17 home runs, 49 RBI and four stolen bases.

On June 24, 2024, Alexander was selected to the 40-man roster and promoted to the major leagues for the first time. He made his debut that day against the Miami Marlins, going 0–for–3 with one strikeout. On July 2, in his fourth career game and eighth career at bat, Alexander recorded his first hit, a single to right field, off of Tampa Bay Rays starting pitcher Zack Littell. On July 5, Alexander and Carlos Hernández were optioned back to the Triple–A Omaha Storm Chasers to make room for the promotion of Walter Pennington and the activation of Adam Frazier from the injured list. Alexander batted .125 with one hit and three strikeouts in eight at bats in his first four MLB games (starting three at third base and pinch-hitting for the designated hitter in one) before being optioned back down to Triple-A. On August 31, he was designated for assignment by Kansas City.

=== Oakland Athletics / Athletics ===
On September 4, 2024, the Oakland Athletics claimed Alexander off waivers. He spent the remainder of the year with the Triple-A Las Vegas Aviators, batting .294/.410/.588 with three home runs and 14 RBI across 12 appearances.

Alexander was optioned to back to Las Vegas to begin the 2025 season, where he hit .252 with 10 home runs and 33 RBI. In six appearances for the Athletics, he batted 3-for-17 (.176). Alexander was designated for assignment by the team on June 5, 2025.

=== New York Yankees ===
On June 8, 2025, the New York Yankees claimed Alexander off waivers. In 13 appearances for the Triple-A Scranton/Wilkes-Barre RailRiders, he went 9-for-46 (.196) with three home runs and two RBI. He was designated for assignment by the Yankees on June 30.

=== Los Angeles Dodgers ===
On July 3, 2025, Alexander was claimed off waivers by the Los Angeles Dodgers. He played in just two games for the Triple-A Oklahoma City Comets before he was designated for assignment on July 7. Alexander cleared waivers and was sent outright back to Oklahoma City on July 10. In 52 games for Oklahoma City, he batted .269 with five home runs and 30 RBI. Alexander elected free agency following the season on November 6.

=== Houston Astros ===
On February 18, 2026, Alexander signed a minor league contract with the Houston Astros. In 86 games with Triple-A Sugar Land Space Cowboys he batted .250/.338/.512 with 21 home runs, 60 RBIs and 2 stolen bases. He elected free agency on November 2.

== Personal life ==
Alexander's brother, Blaze, also plays professional baseball.
