= Anel De Los Santos =

Dominican baseball player (born 1988)

- Bullpen catcher
- Born: June 19, 1988 (age 38); Baní, Dominican Republic
- Bats: Right Throws: Right
- Stats at Baseball Reference

Teams
- AZL Angels; Orem Owlz; Arkansas Travelers; Cedar Rapids Kernels; Rancho Cucamonga Quakes; Los Angeles Angels

Anel Manuel De Los Santos (born June 19, 1988) is a Dominican baseball coach in the Los Angeles Angels of Major League Baseball (MLB) system and former minor league baseball player. He previously served as bullpen catcher for the major league team from 2016 to 2018 after being appointed by then-manager Mike Scioscia.

== Playing career ==
De Los Santos opened his career with the Arizona League team for the Angels in the 2006 season. He batted .250, with an on-base percentage of .295. In 2007, he played for the Angels Pioneer League affiliate the Orem Owlz, batting .255 with 6 home runs in 50 games. De Los Santos split time the next season at the Angels AA affiliate, the Arkansas Travelers, and the single-A Cedar Rapids Kernels.

His performance in 2008 was significantly diminished, batting an average of .188 between the two teams. He played once more with the Kernels in 2009, as well as with the Dominican Winter League team Águilas Cibaeñas for two games. With the Kernels, he played more games than before, with 76, and improved in every statistical category from the last season. De Los Santos played his last professional season in 2010 with the Travelers, AZL Angels, and Rancho Cucamonga Quakes. His performance fell to a .200 batting average with just one home run.

== Coaching career ==
From 2013 to 2015, De Los Santos served as the hitting coach for the Dominican Summer League Angels. On May 10, 2016, Mike Scioscia added De Los Santos to his MLB coaching staff as bullpen catcher. As of April 15, 2020, he was no longer listed as a member of the Angels coaching staff. Prior to the 2021 season, he was once more appointed a hitting coach for the DSL Angels, alongside Raywilly Gomez.
