= Joe Kruzel =

American baseball coach and player (born 1965)

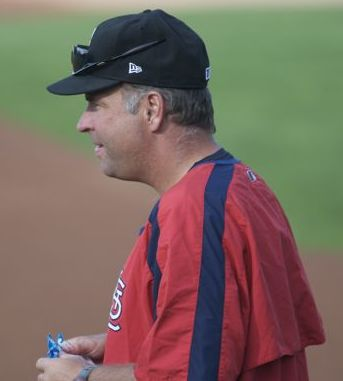
- Kruzel as hitting coach of the Quad Cities River Bandits in 2008

Current position
- Title: Manager
- Team: Rocket City Trash Pandas

Biographical details
- Born: December 17, 1965 (age 60)

Playing career
- 1985–1988: Toledo
- Position: Infielder

Coaching career (HC unless noted)
- 1989–1992: Toledo (assistant)
- 1993–2003: Toledo
- 2005: Miami (OH) (assistant)
- 2006: GLC Reds (hitting)
- 2007: Billings Mustangs
- 2008–2012: Quad Cities River Bandits (hitting)
- 2013: Johnson City Cardinals
- 2014–2016: Peoria Chiefs
- 2017–2018: State College Spikes
- 2019–2020: Springfield Cardinals
- 2021: Billings Mustangs

Head coaching record
- Overall: 259–331 (college)

Joe Kruzel (born December 17, 1965) is an American baseball coach and former player. In 2021, Kruzel managed the Billings Mustangs of the Pioneer League. In 2022 he was named the Field Coordinator for the Los Angeles Angels organization. Kruzel served as the head baseball coach at his alma mater, The University of Toledo from 1993 to 2003, compiling a record of 259–331. Kruzel won the Mid-American Conference Coach of the Year award in 1999. In 2026, Kruzel was hired as manager of the Rocket City Trash Pandas.

== Early life ==
Kruzel was born in Toledo, Ohio and attended Central Catholic High School. He played college baseball at the University of Toledo.
