= Drew Waters =

American baseball player (born 1998)

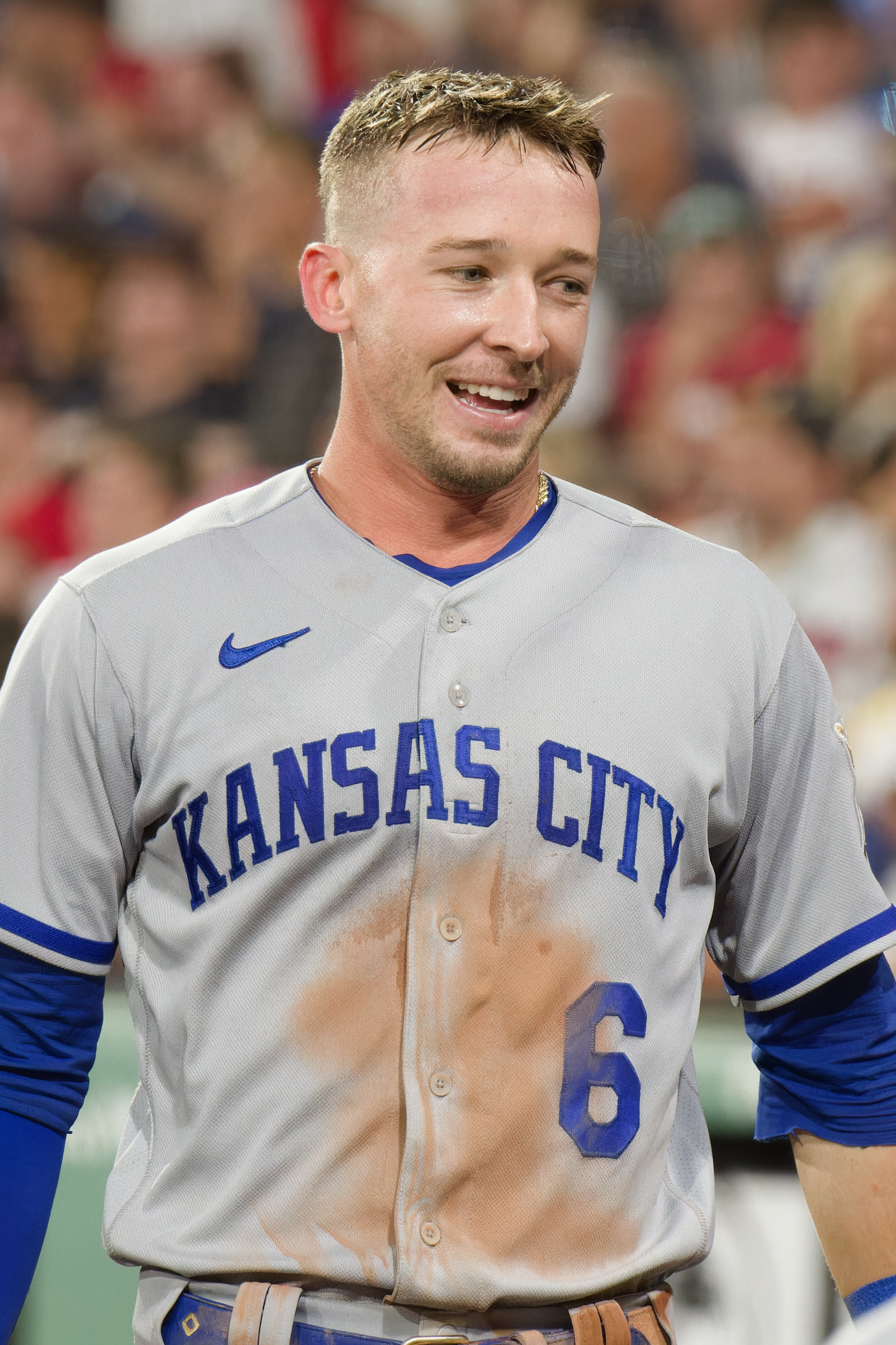
- Waters with the Royals in 2023

Free agent
- Outfielder
- Born: December 30, 1998 (age 27); Atlanta, Georgia, U.S.
- Bats: Switch Throws: Right

MLB debut
- August 22, 2022, for the Kansas City Royals

MLB statistics (through 2025 season)
- Batting average: .234
- Home runs: 14
- Runs batted in: 65
- Stats at Baseball Reference

Teams
- Kansas City Royals (2022–2025)

Andrew David Waters (born December 30, 1998) is an American professional baseball outfielder who is a free agent. He has previously played in Major League Baseball (MLB) for the Kansas City Royals.

== Amateur career ==
Waters graduated from Etowah High School in Woodstock, Georgia. As a senior, he batted.516 with 15 home runs and 40 runs batted in (RBI), leading Etowah to a Class 7A state championship title. After the season, he was named the Georgia Gatorade Player of the Year and the Metro Atlanta High School Player of the Year. He committed to play college baseball at the University of Georgia for the Georgia Bulldogs.

== Professional career ==
=== Atlanta Braves ===
The Atlanta Braves selected Waters in the second round, with the 41st overall selection, of the 2017 Major League Baseball draft. He signed with the Braves for a $1.5 million signing bonus, forgoing his commitment to Georgia.

After signing, Waters made his professional debut with the rookie–level Gulf Coast League Braves. After batting.347/.448/.571 with two home runs, ten RBI, and seven walks, he was promoted to the Danville Braves of the Rookie Advanced Appalachian League, where he finished the season. In 36 games for Danville, he slashed.255/.331/.383 with two home runs and 14 RBI. In 2018, he began with the Rome Braves of the Single–A South Atlantic League, with whom he earned All-Star honors, and was promoted to the Florida Fire Frogs of the High–A Florida State League on August 1. In 114 games between the two clubs, he slashed.293/.343/.476 with nine home runs, 39 RBI, and 23 stolen bases. In 2019, he began with the Mississippi Braves of the Double–A Southern League and was named an All-Star. In August, he was promoted to the Gwinnett Stripers of the Triple–A International League. Over 134 games with the two teams, Waters batted.309/.360/.459 with seven home runs, 52 RBI, and 16 stolen bases. He was named the Southern League Most Valuable Player. After the season, he was selected for the United States national baseball team in the 2019 WBSC Premier 12.

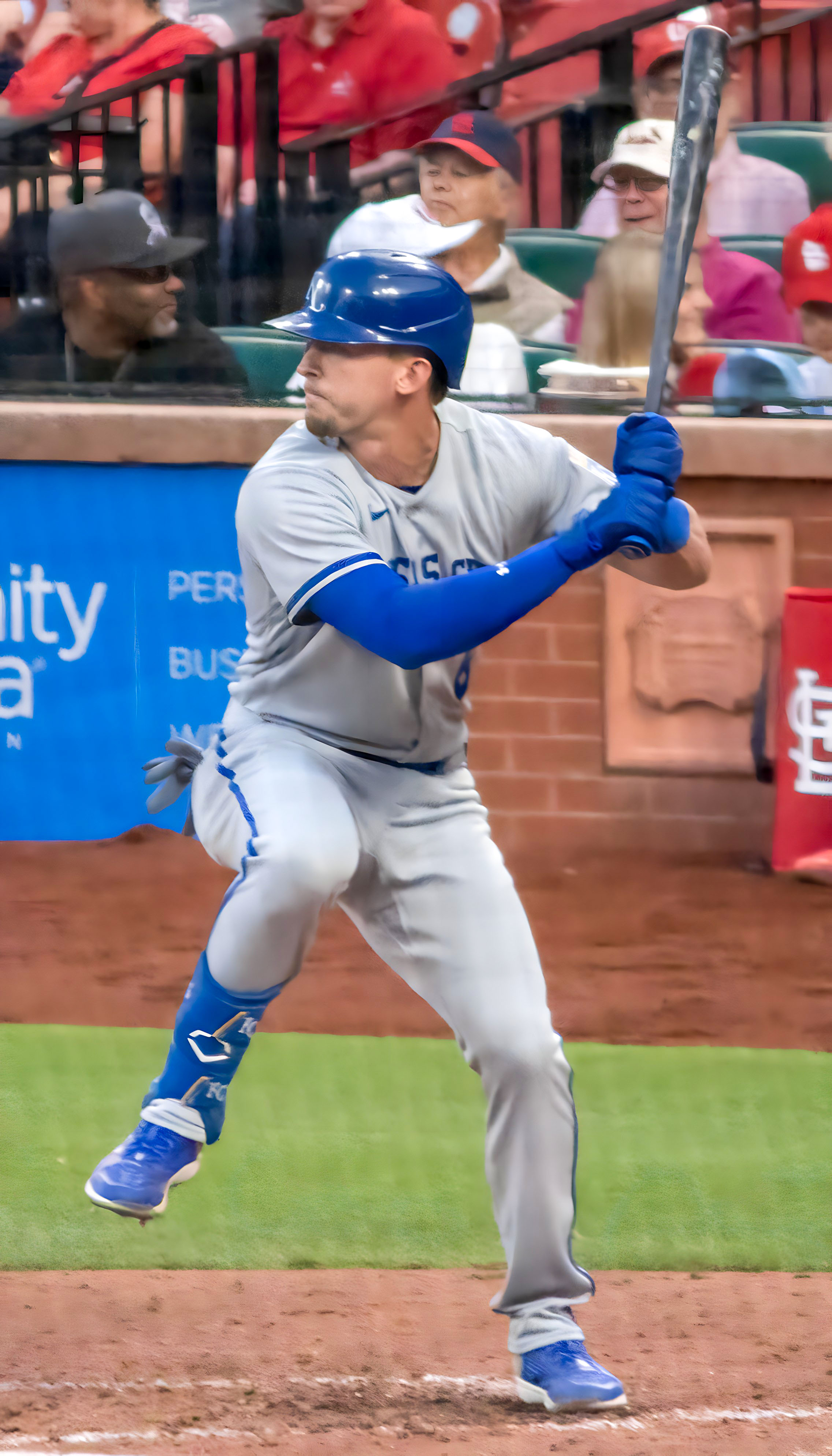
Waters batting for the Royals in 2023

Waters did not play a minor league game in 2020 due to the cancellation of the minor league season because of the COVID-19 pandemic. He was added to Atlanta's 60-man player pool and trained with other players in the pool in Gwinnett during the summer. For the 2021 season, he was assigned to Gwinnett, now members of the Triple-A East. In June, Waters was selected to play in the All-Star Futures Game at Coors Field. Over 103 games played for Gwinnett, Waters slashed .240/.329/.381 with 11 home runs, 37 RBI, and 28 stolen bases. On November 18, 2021, the Braves added Waters to the 40-man roster.

Waters began the 2022 season on the injured list for Gwinnett. He was activated in early May. Over 49 games with Gwinnett, he batted .246 with five home runs and 16 RBI.

=== Kansas City Royals ===
On July 11, 2022, the Braves traded Waters, CJ Alexander, and Andrew Hoffmann to the Kansas City Royals in exchange for the 35th overall pick in the 2022 Major League Baseball draft, a competitive balance pick that Atlanta used on JR Ritchie. The Royals optioned Waters to the Omaha Storm Chasers. Over 31 games with Omaha, he hit .295 with seven home runs, 17 RBI, and 13 stolen bases.

On August 22, 2022, the Royals promoted Waters to the major leagues. He collected his first career hit on August 24, a single off of Arizona Diamondbacks starter Zac Gallen. On September 5, Waters hit his first career home run, a two–run shot off of Cleveland Guardians starter Triston McKenzie. In 32 games during his rookie campaign, he batted .240/.324/.479 with five home runs and 18 RBI.

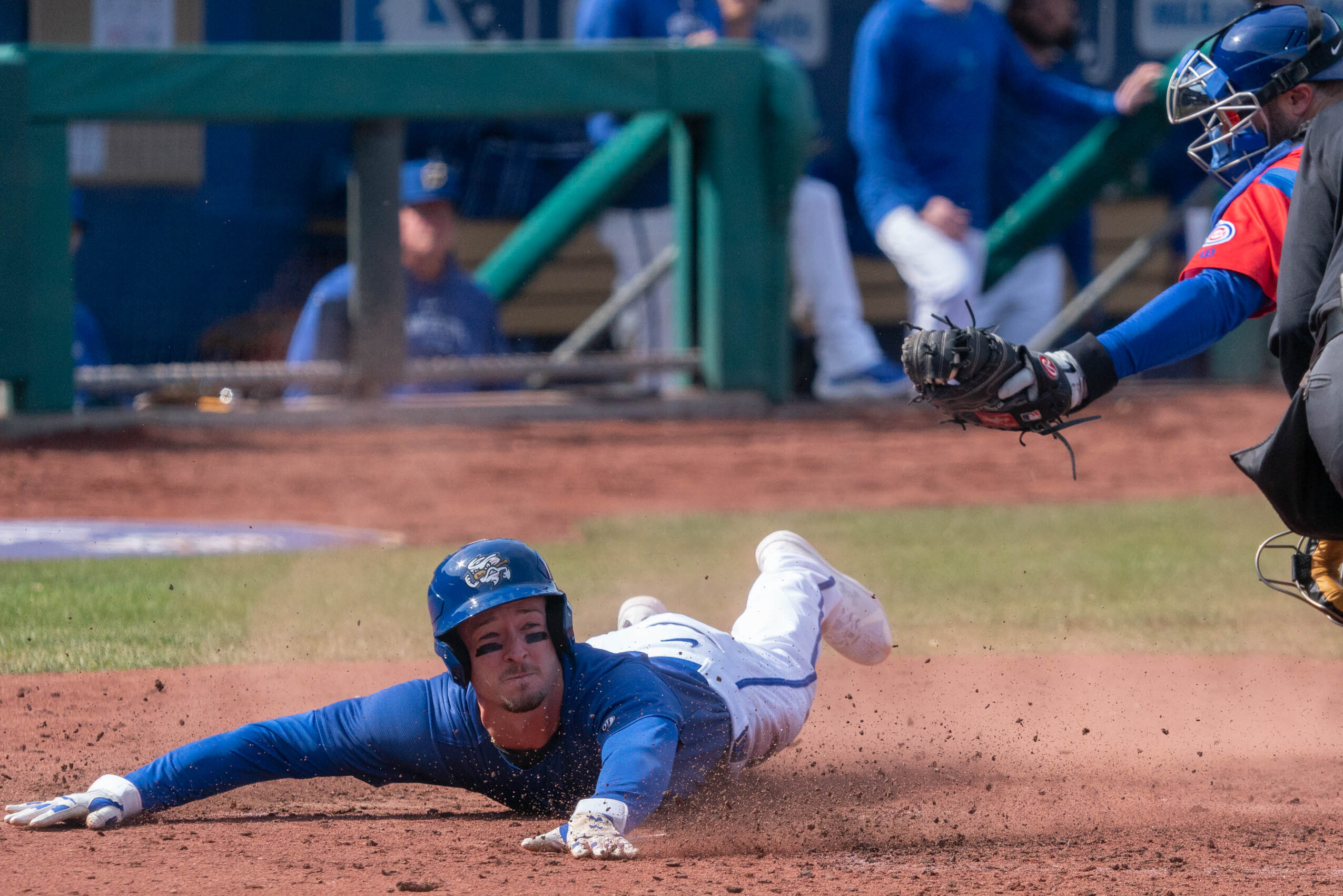
Waters scoring a run for the Storm Chasers in 2024

Waters played in 98 games for the Royals in 2023, hitting .229/.300/.378 with 8 home runs, 32 RBI, and 16 stolen bases. Waters was optioned to Triple-A Omaha to begin the 2024 season. He was with the Royals for two stretches, playing three games in mid-June, then four games in July. He batted .188 with one double and two walks in 19 plate appearances. With Omaha, he hit .290 with 13 home runs and 7 stolen bases in 109 games.

Waters was optioned to Triple-A Omaha to begin the 2025 season. While playing for the Storm Chasers, Waters hit for the cycle for the first time in his professional career and was named International League Player of the Week for March 31 through April 6. Waters made 71 total appearances for the Royals during the regular season, batting .243/.288/.316 with one home run, 14 RBI, and five stolen bases.

On March 25, 2026, Waters was designated for assignment by the Royals. He cleared waivers and was sent outright to Triple-A Omaha on March 29. In 98 appearances for Omaha, Waters batted .251/.312/.420 with 12 home runs, 49 RBI, and 17 stolen bases. On September 1, the Royals selected Waters' contract, adding him to their active roster. He was designated for assignment the next day without making an appearance for the Royals. Waters cleared waivers and was sent outright to Omaha on September 4. He elected free agency on October 3.
