= Brendan Katin =

American baseball playee (born 1983)

- Outfielder
- Born: January 28, 1983 (age 42); Fort Myers, Florida, US
- Bats: Right Throws: Right

Brendan J. Katin (born January 28, 1983) is an American former professional baseball outfielder in the Milwaukee Brewers minor league system.

== Career ==
Katin was originally drafted by the San Diego Padres in both the 2001 and 2002 amateur drafts, but did not sign. He then played for two years (2004–2005) for the University of Miami men's baseball team before being drafted by the Milwaukee Brewers in the 23rd round of the 2005 amateur draft.

He began his career that year, playing for their Rookie League Helena Brewers and Class A West Virginia Power. He advanced to the Class A-Advanced Brevard County Manatees in 2006, where he was named to the league's All-Star team as a designated hitter. Later in the season, he was promoted to the Double-A Huntsville Stars. He played the entire 2007 season with Huntsville and was named to the league's mid-season and post-season All-Star teams. He also led the league with 24 home runs and 94 RBI. In 2008, Katin was promoted to the Triple-A Nashville Sounds.

=== Positive test for elevated testosterone ===
In 2007, Katin tested positive for steroids with a high level of testosterone in a mandatory drug urine test, and faced a possible 50-game suspension. He appealed the test results, and they were overturned.
