= Toyota Field (Alabama) =

Baseball park in Madison, Alabama

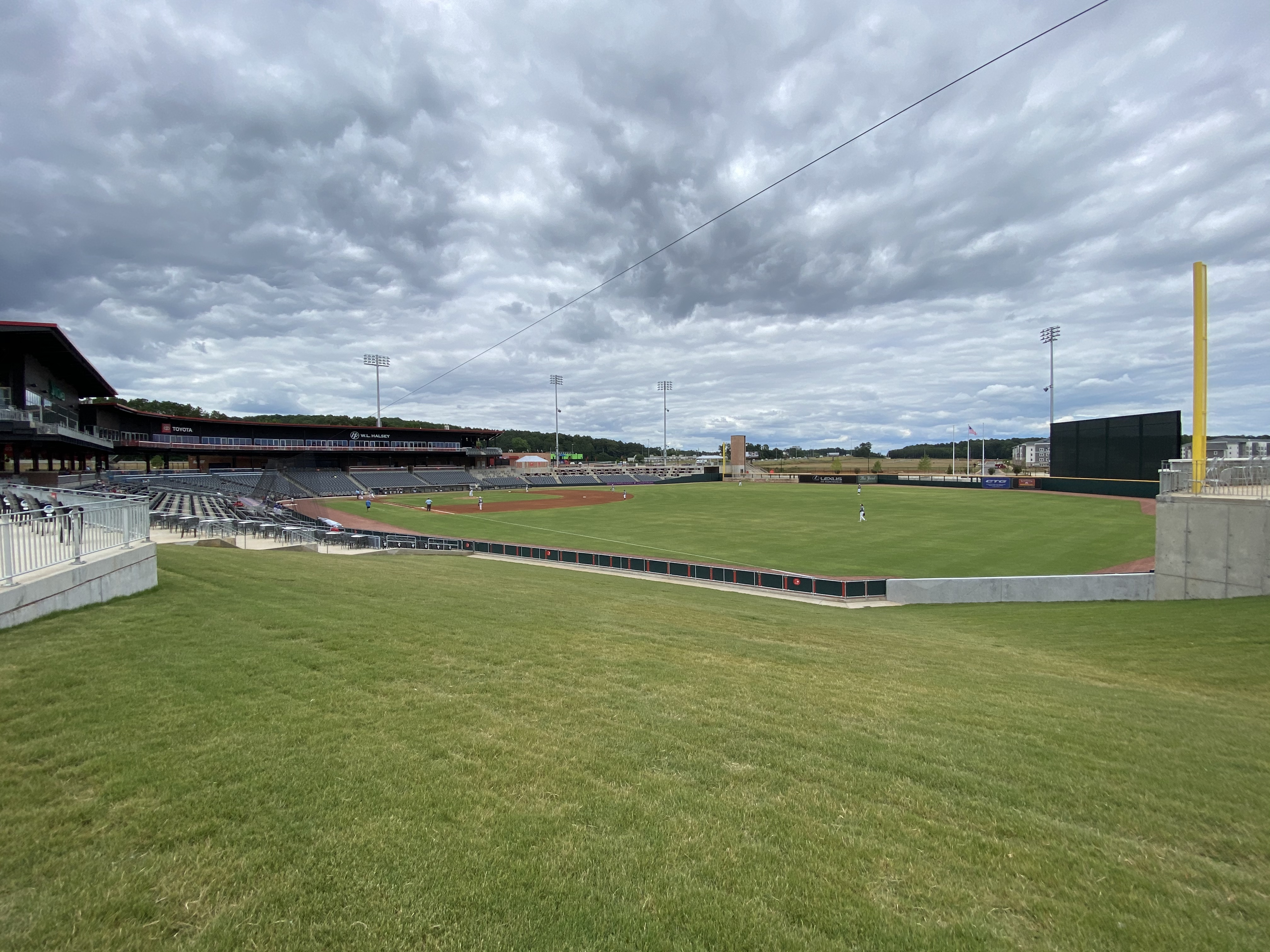
- View of Toyota Field from Budweiser Berm

- Location within Alabama Location within the United States
- Address: 500 Trash Panda Way; Madison, Alabama; United States
- Coordinates: 34.683883°N 86.724288°W
- Owner: City of Madison
- Operator: BallCorps LLC
- Capacity: 7,000
- Surface: Grass
- Field size: Left Field: 326 ft (99 m); Left-Center Field: 385 ft (117 m); Center Field: 400 ft (120 m); Right-Center Field: 375 ft (114 m); Right Field: 326 ft (99 m)

Construction
- Groundbreaking: June 9, 2018
- Opened: April 15, 2020
- Cost: $46 million
- Architect: Populous
- Project manager: Turner Construction
- Structural engineer: Thornton Tomasetti
- Services engineer: Henderson Engineers
- General contractor: Hoar Construction

Tenant
- Rocket City Trash Pandas (SL) 2020–present

Toyota Field is a baseball park in Madison, Alabama. It is located west of Huntsville, the metropolitan area's largest city, and sits on a major thoroughfare, Interstate 565. It serves as the home of the Rocket City Trash Pandas, the relocated minor league team formerly known as the Mobile BayBears, a team that plays in the Southern League. It was scheduled to open April 15, 2020 and seats up to 7,000 people. Groundbreaking occurred on June 9, 2018. Toyota Motor Manufacturing Alabama purchased the naming rights to the stadium.

Because of the COVID-19 pandemic hitting the United States in the spring of 2020, the minor league baseball season that year was canceled. However, some limited-attendance public events were staged by the Trash Pandas that summer at Toyota Field prior to the team's opening game on May 11, 2021.

The first football game played at Toyota Field was held on October 15, 2022, between the North Alabama Lions from nearby Florence, and the Jacksonville State Gamecocks. The game was the first college football game ever played in Madison, Alabama.
