= Rocket City Trash Pandas =

Minor League Baseball team in Madison, Alabama

- Founded in 2020; Madison, Alabama

Minor league affiliations
- Class: Double-A (2020–present)
- League: Southern League (2020–present)
- Division: North Division

Major league affiliations
- Team: Los Angeles Angels (2020–present)

Minor league titles
- League titles (1): 2026
- Division titles (1): 2026
- First-half titles (1): 2022
- Second-half titles (2): 2022; 2026

Team data
- Name: Rocket City Trash Pandas (2020–present)
- Colors: Red, blue, gray, white, black
- Mascot: Sprocket
- Ballpark: Toyota Field (2020–present)
- Owner/ Operator: BallCorps LLC
- General manager: Garrett Fahrmann
- Manager: Joe Kruzel
- Website: mlb.com/milb/rocket-city

The Rocket City Trash Pandas are a Minor League Baseball team of the Southern League and the Double-A affiliate of the Los Angeles Angels. They are located in Madison, Alabama, and are named in reference to raccoons and the area's association with the space industry. The Trash Pandas play their home games at Toyota Field, which opened in 2020.

The team was established after the Southern League's Mobile BayBears relocated to Madison from Mobile, following the 2019 season. Their inaugural campaign was postponed due to the cancellation of the 2020 season because of the COVID-19 pandemic, so they played their first season in 2021.

Rocket City won the Southern League championship in 2026.

== History ==
In November 2017, BallCorps LLC purchased the Southern League's Mobile BayBears from owners Michael Savit and HWS Group for the purpose of relocating the team to Madison, Alabama, in 2020. They would continue as the Double-A affiliate of the Los Angeles Angels. The team was renamed the Rocket City Trash Pandas. The name is a reference to both the area's association with the space industry, namely from Huntsville, and the determination and ingenuity of raccoons (which are native to the Huntsville area; "trash panda" is a slang nickname for the animal due to their facial resemblance to the panda and their tendency to dig through trash). By December 2019, the team had sold more than $2 million in merchandise in the just over 13 months since announcing its branding.

The Trash Pandas were scheduled to begin their inaugural season on the road playing against the Birmingham Barons on April 9, 2020, and play their first home game on April 15; however, the start of the 2020 season was postponed before being cancelled altogether on June 30 due to the COVID-19 pandemic, pushing back their inaugural season by a year.

In conjunction with Major League Baseball's restructuring of Minor League Baseball in 2021, the Southern League disbanded and the Trash Pandas were organized into the eight-team Double-A South. Their scheduled May 4, 2021, road opener was postponed due to inclement weather, so they played their first game the next night against the Chattanooga Lookouts at AT&T Field in Chattanooga, Tennessee, losing 6–1. Rocket City recorded their first win the following evening, defeating Chattanooga, 10–7. Their first home game at Toyota Field was played on May 11, resulting in a 4–3 loss to the Tennessee Smokies in 10 innings before a sellout crowd of 7,500 people. The Trash Pandas got their first home win the next night with a 6–4 victory over the Smokies. They ended their inaugural season with a 54–56 record, placing 6th out of 10 teams and missing the championship playoffs in which only the league's top two finishers qualified.

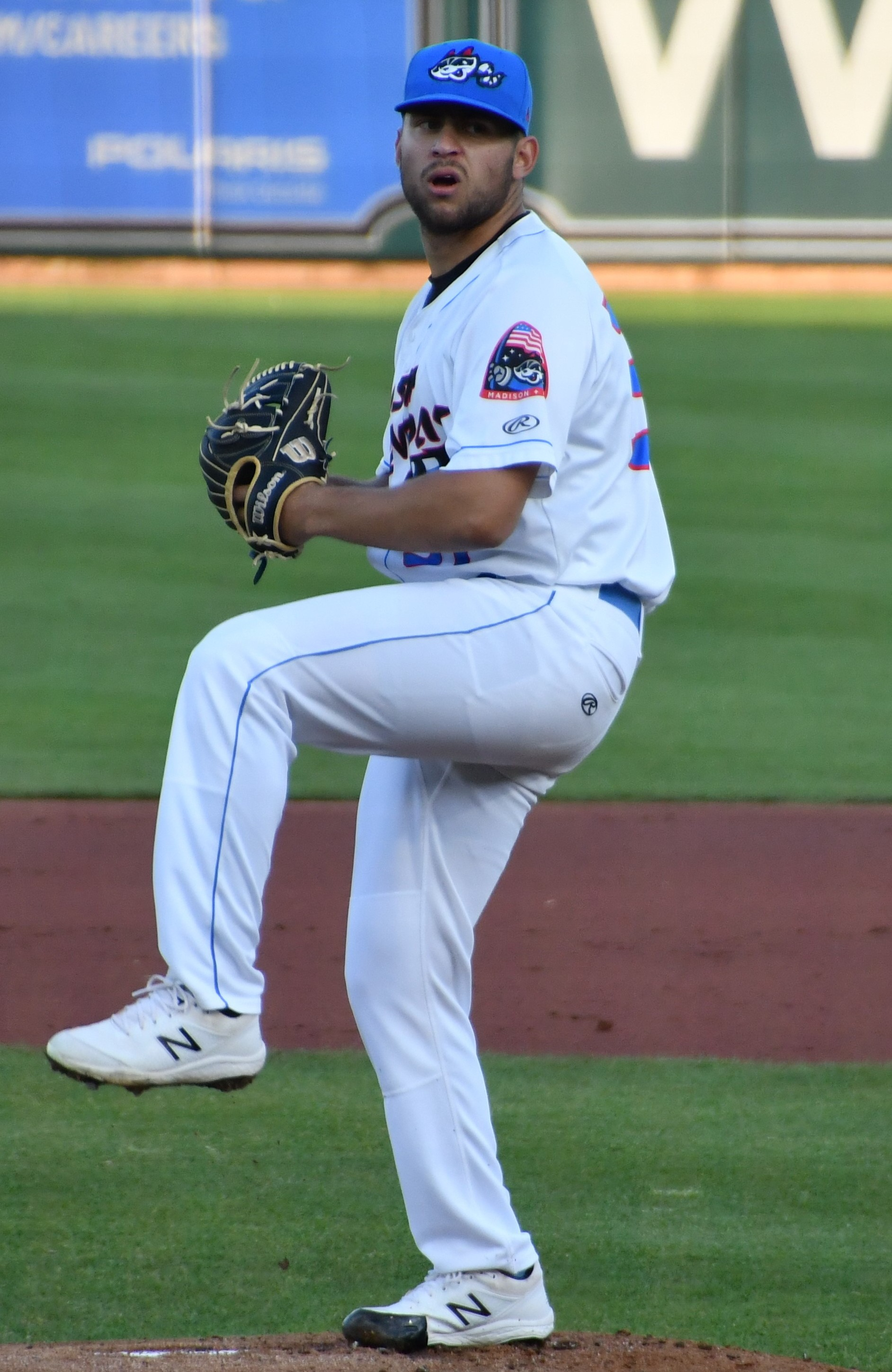
Chase Silseth pitched the first seven innings of no-hitter and won the SL Pitcher of the Year Award in 2022.

In 2022, the Double-A South became known as the Southern League, the name historically used by the regional circuit prior to the 2021 reorganization. On September 3, pitchers Chase Silseth (7 innings pitched), Luke Murphy (1 IP), and Eric Torres (1 IP) threw a combined no-hitter against the Biloxi Shuckers at Toyota Field. The 8–0 win was the first no-hit game in franchise history. As it had in seasons prior, the league returned to using a split-season schedule wherein the division winners from each half qualified for the championship playoffs. In June, the Trash Pandas won the first-half Northern Division title to clinch a playoff berth. In their first postseason appearance, the Trash Pandas fell to the second-half champion Tennessee Smokies, 2–1, in the first round. Overall, the team posted a league-best 81–57 record. Chase Silseth won the Southern League Pitcher of the Year Award, and manager Andy Schatzley was chosen for the Southern League Manager of the Year Award.

On April 8, 2023, pitchers Coleman Crow (6 IP), Ben Joyce (2/3 IP), and Eric Torres (1/3 IP), combined to no-hit the Chattanooga Lookouts in the first game of a seven-inning doubleheader in Madison, a 7–5 loss. Though allowing no hits, Chattanooga scored seven runs in the seventh inning. Crow, who had given up no hits over six innings, was replaced by Joyce to start the seventh. He walked the first two Chattanooga batters before inducing a pop-up for the first out. He then walked a third batter to load the bases, but struck out the next for the second out. Joyce walked a fourth batter, forcing home the first run. The next batter reached on a fielding error, which allowed three more runners to score. Joyce was then replaced by Torres, who had participated in their previous no-hitter. The next three batters were hit by pitches, with the third forcing in a run. The Lookouts scored two final runs on another walk and a wild pitch. One more batter was hit before Torres struck out the 13th batter to end the inning.

The 2023 Trash Pandas compiled a 58–80 record and did not win either half of the season. They improved to 61–75 in 2024, but finished last out of eight teams at 45–92 in 2025.

Rocket City missed winning the 2026 first half by two-and-a-half games behind the Knoxville Smokies, but clinched the second-half title by one-and-a-half games over Knoxville. They then swept the Smokies, 2–0, in the best-of-three series to win the Northern Division title. The Trash Pandas ended their postseason with a win, defeating the Southern Division champion Biloxi Shuckers, 2–1, in a full three-game series to capture their first Southern League championship. Their season record under manager Joe Kruzel was 72–65.

== Season-by-season records ==
Key
| League | The team's final position in the league standings |
| Division | The team's final position in the divisional standings |
| GB | Games behind the team that finished in first place in the division that season |
| † | League champions (2021–present) |
| * | Division champions (2022–present) |
| ^ | Postseason berth (2021–present) |

Season-by-season records
| Season | League | Regular-season | | | | | Postseason | | | MLB affiliate | Ref. |
| Season | League | Record | Win % | League | Division | GB | Record | Win % | Result | MLB affiliate | Ref. |
|---|---|---|---|---|---|---|---|---|---|---|---|
| 2020 | SL | Season cancelled (COVID-19 pandemic) | | | | | | | Result | Los Angeles Angels | |
| 2021 | AAS | 54–56 | .491 | 6th | 3rd | 4 | — | — | — | Los Angeles Angels | |
| 2022^ | SL | 81–57 | .587 | 1st | 1st | — | 1–2 | .333 | Won First-Half Northern Division title Lost Northern Division title vs. Tennessee Smokies, 2–1 | Los Angeles Angels | |
| 2023 | SL | 58–80 | .420 | 7th | 3rd | 17 1/2 | — | — | — | Los Angeles Angels | |
| 2024 | SL | 61–75 | .449 | 7th | 3rd | 25 1/2 | — | — | — | Los Angeles Angels | |
| 2025 | SL | 45–92 | .328 | 8th | 4th | 35 1/2 | — | — | — | Los Angeles Angels | |
| 2026^ * † | SL | 72–65 | .526 | 3rd | 2nd | 1 | 4–1 | .800 | Won Second-Half Northern Division title Won Northern Division title vs. Tennessee Smokies, 2–0; Won SL championship vs. Biloxi Shuckers, 2–1 | Los Angeles Angels | |
| Totals | — | 371–425 | .466 | — | — | — | 5–3 | .625 | — | — | — |

== Roster ==
Rocket City Trash Pandas roster
| Players | Coaches/Other |
|---|---|
| Pitchers: 37 Jose Atencio; 36 Tyler Bremner; 57 Derek Clark; 49 Chris Cortez; 35 Carlos Espinosa; 34 Jose Gonzalez; 52 Austin Gordon; 26 Lucas Knowles; 46 Lucas Mahlstedt; 23 Camden Minacci; 29 Bryce Osmond; 25 Dylan Phillips ~; 39 Nicolo Pinazzi; 50 Eybersson Polanco; 53 Kyle Robinson; 45 Nate Snead; 27 Kenyon Yovan; Catchers: 30 Caleb Bartolero; 28 Jacob Cozart; 1 J.J. D'Orazio ~; 7 Juan Flores; Infielders: 19 Cole Fontenelle; -- Kendrey Maduro ~; 2 Mac McCroskey; 29 Jake Munroe; 3 Arjun Nimmala; 11 Nick Rodriguez; Outfielders: 8 Randy De Jesus; 22 Tucker Flint; 32 Eddie Micheletti Jr.; 10 Anthony Scull; 31 Jake Thompson | Manager: 13 Joe Kruzel; Coaches: 43 Daren Brown (coach); 48 Doug Henry (pitching); 12 Tony Jaramillo (hitting); 21 Tim Leveque ( pitching); 7-day injured list; * On Los Angeles Angels 40-man roster; ~ Development list; # Rehab assignment; ∞ Reserve list; ‡ Restricted list; § Suspended list; † Temporarily inactive list; Roster updated September 7, 2026; Transactions; → More rosters: MiLB • Southern League; → Los Angeles Angels minor league players |

== Achievements ==
=== Awards ===
One player and one manager have won Southern League awards in recognition for their performance with the Trash Pandas.

| Award | Recipient | Season | Ref. |
|---|---|---|---|
| Pitcher of the Year | Chase Silseth | 2022 | |
| Manager of the Year | Andy Schatzley | 2022 | |

=== Postseason All-Stars ===
Seven players have been named to the Southern League Postseason All-Star Team.

| Season | Player | Position | Ref. |
|---|---|---|---|
| 2022 | Eric Torres | Pitcher | |
| 2023 | Kyren Paris | Shortstop | |
| 2024 | Gustavo Campero | Outfielder | |
| 2024 | Caden Dana | Pitcher | |
| 2024 | Eric Wagaman | Outfielder | |
| 2025 | Denzer Guzmán | Shortstop | |
| 2026 | Luke Murphy | Pitcher | |

== Managers ==
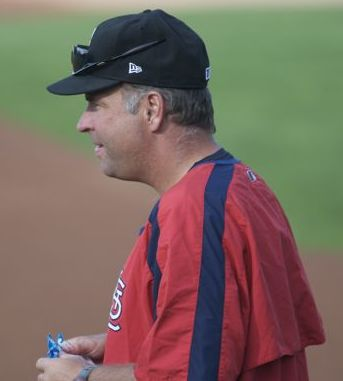
Joe Kruzel led the Trash Pandas to win the Southern League championship in 2026.

The Rocket City Trash Pandas have been led by three different managers since their inaugural season. Joe Kruzel (2026) is the only one to have guided the team to win the Southern League championship. He also has the highest winning percentage (.526) in team history. Andy Schatzley is the longest-tenured manager, having managed 449 games over four seasons (2022–2025).

Managerial records
| No. | Manager | Season(s) | Regular-season | | | | Postseason | | | | Ref(s). |
| No. | Manager | Season(s) | Games | Wins | Losses | Win % | Apps. | Wins | Losses | Win % | Ref(s). |
|---|---|---|---|---|---|---|---|---|---|---|---|
| 1 | Jay Bell | 2020–2021 | 110 | 54 | 56 | .491 | — | — | — | — | |
| 2 | Andy Schatzley | 2022–2025 | 449 | 145 | 304 | .323 | 1 | 1 | 2 | .333 | |
| 3 | Joe Kruzel | 2026–present | 137 | 72 | 65 | .526 | 1 | 4 | 1 | .800 | |
| Totals | 3 managers | 6 seasons | 796 | 371 | 425 | .466 | 2 | 5 | 3 | .625 | — |
