= 2026 Southern League season =

- League: Southern League
- Sport: Baseball
- Duration: April 3 – September 13
- Games: 138
- Teams: 8

Regular season
- League champions: Pensacola Blue Wahoos
- Season MVP: Blake Burke, Biloxi Shuckers

Playoffs
- League champions: Rocket City Trash Pandas
- Runners-up: Biloxi Shuckers

SL seasons
- ← 2025 2027 →

The 2026 Southern League was a Class AA baseball season that was played between April 3 and September 13. Eight teams played a 138-game schedule, with the top team in each division in each half of the season qualifying for the post-season.

== Teams ==
2026 Southern League
Division	Team	City	MLB Affiliate	Stadium
North	Birmingham Barons	Birmingham, Alabama	Chicago White Sox	Regions Field
North	Chattanooga Lookouts	Chattanooga, Tennessee	Cincinnati Reds	Erlanger Park
North	Knoxville Smokies	Knoxville, Tennessee	Chicago Cubs	Covenant Health Park
North	Rocket City Trash Pandas	Madison, Alabama	Los Angeles Angels	Toyota Field
South	Biloxi Shuckers	Biloxi, Mississippi	Milwaukee Brewers	Keesler Federal Park
South	Columbus Clingstones	Columbus, Georgia	Atlanta Braves	Synovus Park
South	Montgomery Biscuits	Montgomery, Alabama	Tampa Bay Rays	Dabos Park
South	Pensacola Blue Wahoos	Pensacola, Florida	Miami Marlins	Blue Wahoos Stadium

== Map of teams ==
North Division South Division

== Regular season ==
- The Pensacola Blue Wahoos finished with the best record in the league for the first time since 2023.

=== Overall standings ===
Final standings

North Division
Team	Win	Loss	%	GB
Knoxville Smokies	73	64	.533	–
Rocket City Trash Pandas	72	65	.526	1
Birmingham Barons	61	77	.442	12.5
Chattanooga Lookouts	59	79	.428	14.5
South Division
Team	Win	Loss	%	GB
Pensacola Blue Wahoos	79	58	.577	–
Montgomery Biscuits	71	66	.518	8
Biloxi Shuckers	66	68	.493	11.5
Columbus Clingstones	64	68	.485	12.5

=== First half standings ===
Final first half standings

North Division
Team	Win	Loss	%	GB
Knoxville Smokies	38	31	.551	–
Chattanooga Lookouts	37	32	.536	1
Rocket City Trash Pandas	35	33	.515	2.5
Birmingham Barons	26	43	.377	12
South Division
Team	Win	Loss	%	GB
Biloxi Shuckers	35	30	.538	–
Pensacola Blue Wahoos	36	33	.522	1
Montgomery Biscuits	35	34	.507	2
Columbus Clingstones	29	35	.453	5.5

=== Second half standings ===
Final second half standings

North Division
Team	Win	Loss	%	GB
Rocket City Trash Pandas	37	32	.536	–
Knoxville Smokies	35	33	.515	1.5
Birmingham Barons	35	34	.507	2
Chattanooga Lookouts	22	47	.319	15
South Division
Team	Win	Loss	%	GB
Pensacola Blue Wahoos	43	25	.632	–
Montgomery Biscuits	36	32	.529	7
Columbus Clingstones	35	33	.515	8
Biloxi Shuckers	31	38	.449	12.5

== League leaders ==
=== Batting leaders ===
Stat	Player	Total
AVG	Blake Burke, Biloxi Shuckers	.285
H	Alex Ramírez, Knoxville Smokies	143
R	Jesús Made, Biloxi Shuckers	87
2B	Nick Rodriguez, Rocket City Trash Pandas	31
3B	Brendan Jones, Pensacola Blue Wahoos	8
HR	Alec Briley, Birmingham Barons; Blake Burke, Biloxi Shuckers; Jordan Groshans, Columbus Clingstones	30
RBI	Jesús Made, Biloxi Shuckers; Will Simpson, Montgomery Biscuits	91
SB	Dylan O'Rae, Biloxi Shuckers	63

=== Pitching leaders ===
Stat	Player	Total
W	Manuel Rodriguez, Biloxi Shuckers	13
ERA	Garrett Edwards, Montgomery Biscuits	4.33
CG	Kevin Abel, Chattanooga Lookouts; Garrett Baumann, Columbus Clingstones; Jaron DeBerry, Biloxi Shuckers; Michael Forret, Montgomery Biscuits; TJ Nichols, Montgomery Biscuits; Javier Rivera, Chattanooga Lookouts; Alex Williams, Pensacola Blue Wahoos	1
SHO	Jaron DeBerry, Biloxi Shuckers; Javier Rivera, Chattanooga Lookouts	1
SV	Luke Murphy, Rocket City Trash Pandas	18
IP	Manuel Rodriguez, Biloxi Shuckers	133.0
SO	Jaron DeBerry, Biloxi Shuckers	138

== Playoffs ==
- The Rocket City Trash Pandas won their first Southern League championship, defeating the Biloxi Shuckers in three games.

=== Playoff bracket ===
Division finals
N1	Knoxville	0
N2	Rocket City	2
S1	Biloxi	2
S2	Pensacola	0

Finals
N2	Rocket City	2
S1	Biloxi	1

=== Semi-finals ===
==== (N1) Knoxville Smokies vs. (N2) Rocket City Trash Pandas ====
Rocket City won the series, 2–0.

Game	Date	Score	Location	Time	Attendance
1	September 15	Knoxville – 2, Rocket City – 9	Toyota Field	2:27	2,140
2	September 17	Rocket City – 13, Knoxville – 3	Covenant Health Park	3:16	3,063

==== (S1) Biloxi Shuckers vs. (S2) Pensacola Blue Wahoos ====
Biloxi won the series, 2–0.

Game	Date	Score	Location	Time	Attendance
1	September 15	Biloxi – 6, Pensacola – 3	Blue Wahoos Stadium	3:08	2,260
2	September 17	Pensacola – 3, Biloxi – 8	Keesler Federal Park	2:56	4,133

=== Finals ===
==== (S1) Biloxi Shuckers vs. (N2) Rocket City Trash Pandas ====
Rocket City won series 2-1

Game	Date	Score	Location	Time	Attendance
1	September 20	Rocket City – 5, Biloxi – 4	Keesler Federal Park	2:33	2,332
2	September 22	Biloxi – 7, Rocket City – 0	Toyota Field	2:43	4,756
3	September 23	Biloxi – 1, Rocket City – 3	Toyota Field	2:40	2,912

== Awards ==
Southern League awards
Award name	Recipient
Most Valuable Player	Blake Burke, Biloxi Shuckers
Pitcher of the Year	Eliazar Dishmey, Pensacola Blue Wahoos
Top MLB Prospect Award	Jesús Made, Biloxi Shuckers
Manager of the Year	Nelson Prada, Pensacola Blue Wahoos

== See also ==
- 2026 Major League Baseball season
