= 2025 Southern League season =

- League: Southern League
- Sport: Baseball
- Duration: April 4 – September 14
- Games: 138
- Teams: 8

Regular season
- League champions: Birmingham Barons
- Season MVP: Sal Stewart, Chattanooga Lookouts

Playoffs
- League champions: Birmingham Barons
- Runners-up: Montgomery Biscuits

SL seasons
- ← 2024 2026 →

The 2025 Southern League is a Class AA baseball season that was played between April 4 and September 14. Eight teams played a 138-game schedule, with the top team in each division in each half of the season qualifying for the post-season.

The Birmingham Barons won the Southern League championship, defeating the Montgomery Biscuits in the final round of the playoffs.

== Team changes ==
- The Mississippi Braves relocated to Columbus, Georgia and are renamed to the Columbus Clingstones. The club remains affiliated with the Atlanta Braves.
- The Tennessee Smokies are renamed to the Knoxville Smokies as the team moved into a new stadium in Knoxville, Tennessee. The club remains an affiliate with the Chicago Cubs.

== Teams ==
2025 Southern League
Division	Team	City	MLB Affiliate	Stadium
North	Birmingham Barons	Birmingham, Alabama	Chicago White Sox	Regions Field
North	Chattanooga Lookouts	Chattanooga, Tennessee	Cincinnati Reds	AT&T Field
North	Knoxville Smokies	Knoxville, Tennessee	Chicago Cubs	Covenant Health Park
North	Rocket City Trash Pandas	Madison, Alabama	Los Angeles Angels	Toyota Field
South	Biloxi Shuckers	Biloxi, Mississippi	Milwaukee Brewers	Keesler Federal Park
South	Columbus Clingstones	Columbus, Georgia	Atlanta Braves	Synovus Park
South	Montgomery Biscuits	Montgomery, Alabama	Tampa Bay Rays	Montgomery Riverwalk Stadium
South	Pensacola Blue Wahoos	Pensacola, Florida	Miami Marlins	Blue Wahoos Stadium

== Map of teams ==
North Division South Division

== Regular season ==
=== Summary ===
- The Birmingham Barons finished the season with the best record in the league for the first time since 2009.

=== Overall standings ===
Final standings

North Division
Team	Win	Loss	%	GB
Birmingham Barons	81	57	.587	–
Chattanooga Lookouts	73	61	.545	6
Knoxville Smokies	69	67	.507	11
Rocket City Trash Pandas	45	92	.328	35.5
South Division
Montgomery Biscuits	78	60	.565	–
Biloxi Shuckers	74	64	.536	4
Pensacola Blue Wahoos	69	69	.500	9
Columbus Clingstones	58	77	.430	18.5

=== First half standings ===
Final first half standings

North Division
Team	Win	Loss	%	GB
Chattanooga Lookouts	38	28	.576	–
Birmingham Barons	38	31	.551	1.5
Knoxville Smokies	32	36	.471	7
Rocket City Trash Pandas	24	44	.353	15
South Division
Biloxi Shuckers	42	27	.609	–
Montgomery Biscuits	38	31	.551	4
Pensacola Blue Wahoos	34	35	.493	8
Columbus Clingstones	26	40	.394	14.5

=== Second half standings ===
Final second half standings

North Division
Team	Win	Loss	%	GB
Birmingham Barons	43	26	.623	–
Knoxville Smokies	37	31	.544	5.5
Chattanooga Lookouts	35	33	.515	7.5
Rocket City Trash Pandas	21	48	.304	22
South Division
Montgomery Biscuits	40	29	.580	–
Pensacola Blue Wahoos	35	34	.507	5
Biloxi Shuckers	32	37	.464	8
Columbus Clingstones	32	37	.464	8

== League leaders ==
=== Batting leaders ===
Stat	Player	Total
AVG	Homer Bush Jr., Montgomery Biscuits	.301
H	Homer Bush Jr., Montgomery Biscuits	142
R	Luis Lara, Biloxi Shuckers	79
2B	Luis Lara, Biloxi Shuckers	32
3B	Homer Bush Jr., Montgomery Biscuits	8
HR	Ruben Ibarra, Chattanooga Lookouts	21
RBI	BJ Murray, Knoxville Smokies	89
SB	Homer Bush Jr., Montgomery Biscuits	57

=== Pitching leaders ===
Stat	Player	Total
W	Ian Mejia, Columbus Clingstones	12
ERA	Shane Murphy, Birmingham Barons	1.38
CG	Kevin Abel, Chattanooga Lookouts; Chase Burns, Chattanooga Lookouts; Mitch Farris, Rocket City Trash Pandas; Dax Fulton, Pensacola Blue Wahoos; Landon Harper, Columbus Clingstones; Brody Hopkins, Montgomery Biscuits; George Klassen, Rocket City Trash Pandas; Ian Mejia, Columbus Clingstones; Walbert Urena, Rocket City Trash Pandas	1
SHO	Chase Burns, Chattanooga Lookouts; Landon Harper, Columbus Clingstones	1
SV	Trevor Kuncl, Chattanooga Lookouts	20
IP	Walbert Urena, Rocket City Trash Pandas	135.1
SO	Riley Gowens, Birmingham Barons	151

== Playoffs ==
- The Birmingham Barons won their second consecutive Southern League championship, and their ninth overall title.

=== Playoff bracket ===
Division finals
N1	Chattanooga	1
N2	Birmingham	2
S1	Biloxi	0
S2	Montgomery	2

Finals
N2	Birmingham	2
S2	Montgomery	1

=== Semi-finals ===
==== (N1) Chattanooga Lookouts vs. (N2) Birmingham Barons ====
Birmingham won the series, 2–1.

Game	Date	Score	Location	Time	Attendance
1	September 16	Chattanooga Lookouts – 8, Birmingham Barons – 6	Regions Field	2:59	2,349
2	September 18	Birmingham Barons – 4, Chattanooga Lookouts – 0	AT&T Field	2:17	2,840
3	September 19	Birmingham Barons – 9, Chattanooga Lookouts – 6	AT&T Field	3:13	2,245

==== (S1) Biloxi Shuckers vs. (S2) Montgomery Biscuits ====
Montgomery won the series, 2–0.

Game	Date	Score	Location	Time	Attendance
1	September 16	Biloxi Shuckers – 2, Montgomery Biscuits – 7	Montgomery Riverwalk Stadium	2:50	4,142
2	September 18	Montgomery Biscuits – 4, Biloxi Shuckers – 2	Keesler Federal Park	2:51	3,001

=== Finals ===
==== (S2) Montgomery Biscuits vs. (N2) Birmingham Barons ====
Birmingham won the series, 2–1.

Game	Date	Score	Location	Time	Attendance
1	September 21	Montgomery Biscuits – 2, Birmingham Barons – 1	Regions Field	2:25	1,858
2	September 23	Birmingham Barons – 7, Montgomery Biscuits – 3	Montgomery Riverwalk Stadium	2:37	4,126
3	September 24	Birmingham Barons – 6, Chattanooga Lookouts – 3	Montgomery Riverwalk Stadium	2:42	2,647

== Awards ==
Southern League awards
Award name	Recipient
Most Valuable Player	Sal Stewart, Chattanooga Lookouts
Pitcher of the Year	Ty Johnson, Montgomery Biscuits
Top MLB Prospect Award	Sal Stewart, Chattanooga Lookouts
Manager of the Year	Joe Ayrault, Biloxi Shuckers

== See also ==
- 2025 Major League Baseball season
