= 2024 Southern League season =

- League: Southern League
- Sport: Baseball
- Duration: April 5 – September 15
- Games: 138
- Teams: 8

Regular season
- League champions: Tennessee Smokies
- Season MVP: Matt Shaw, Tennessee Smokies

Playoffs
- League champions: Birmingham Barons
- Runners-up: Montgomery Biscuits

SL seasons
- ← 2023 2025 →

The 2024 Southern League was a Class AA baseball season played between April 5 and September 15. Eight teams played a 138-game schedule, with the top team in each division in each half of the season qualifying for the post-season.

The Birmingham Barons won the Southern League championship, defeating the Montgomery Biscuits in the playoffs.

== Teams ==
2024 Southern League
Division	Team	City	MLB Affiliate	Stadium
North	Birmingham Barons	Birmingham, Alabama	Chicago White Sox	Regions Field
North	Chattanooga Lookouts	Chattanooga, Tennessee	Cincinnati Reds	AT&T Field
North	Rocket City Trash Pandas	Madison, Alabama	Los Angeles Angels	Toyota Field
North	Tennessee Smokies	Sevierville, Tennessee	Chicago Cubs	Smokies Stadium
South	Biloxi Shuckers	Biloxi, Mississippi	Milwaukee Brewers	Keesler Federal Park
South	Mississippi Braves	Jackson, Mississippi	Atlanta Braves	Trustmark Park
South	Montgomery Biscuits	Montgomery, Alabama	Tampa Bay Rays	Montgomery Riverwalk Stadium
South	Pensacola Blue Wahoos	Pensacola, Florida	Miami Marlins	Blue Wahoos Stadium

== Map of teams ==
North Division South Division

== Regular season ==
=== Summary ===
- The Tennessee Smokies finished the season with the best record in the league for the first time since 2010.

=== Standings ===
==== Overall standings ====
North Division
Team	Win	Loss	%	GB
Tennessee Smokies	87	50	.635	–
Birmingham Barons	72	66	.522	15.5
Rocket City Trash Pandas	61	75	.449	25.5
Chattanooga Lookouts	45	90	.333	41
South Division
Montgomery Biscuits	80	57	.584	–
Pensacola Blue Wahoos	71	65	.522	8.5
Biloxi Shuckers	66	69	.489	13
Mississippi Braves	63	73	.463	17.5

==== First half standings ====
North Division
Team	Win	Loss	%	GB
Birmingham Barons	41	28	.594	–
Tennessee Smokies	40	28	.588	0.5
Rocket City Trash Pandas	33	35	.485	7.5
Chattanooga Lookouts	20	49	.290	21
South Division
Montgomery Biscuits	40	29	.580	–
Pensacola Blue Wahoos	38	30	.559	1.5
Mississippi Braves	31	37	.456	8.5
Biloxi Shuckers	30	37	.448	9

==== Second half standings ====
North Division
Team	Win	Loss	%	GB
Tennessee Smokies	47	22	.681	–
Birmingham Barons	31	38	.449	16
Rocket City Trash Pandas	28	40	.412	18.5
Chattanooga Lookouts	25	41	.379	20.5
South Division
Montgomery Biscuits	40	28	.588	–
Biloxi Shuckers	36	32	.529	3.5
Pensacola Blue Wahoos	33	35	.485	7
Mississippi Braves	32	36	.471	8

== League Leaders ==
=== Batting leaders ===
Stat	Player	Total
AVG	Chandler Simpson, Montgomery Biscuits	.351
H	Wilfred Veras, Birmingham Barons	131
R	Carson Williams, Montgomery Biscuits	83
2B	Ernesto Martínez, Biloxi Shuckers	30
3B	Cody Milligan, Mississippi Braves; Carson Williams, Montgomery Biscuits	6
HR	Nicholas Northcut, Chattanooga Lookouts	26
RBI	Carson Williams, Montgomery Biscuits	69
SB	Chandler Simpson, Montgomery Biscuits	73

=== Pitching leaders ===
Stat	Player	Total
W	Luis Palacios, Pensacola Blue Wahoos; Chase Petty, Chattanooga Lookouts; Logan Workman, Montgomery Biscuits	10
ERA	Caden Dana, Rocket City Trash Pandas	2.52
CG	Ian Mejia, Mississippi Braves	3
SHO	Ian Mejia, Mississippi Braves	3
SV	Justin Yeager, Biloxi Shuckers	20
IP	Chase Chaney, Rocket City Trash Pandas	138.0
SO	Caden Dana, Rocket City Trash Pandas	147

== Playoffs ==
- The Birmingham Barons won their eighth Southern League championship, defeating the Montgomery Biscuits in two games.

=== Playoff bracket ===
Division finals
N1	Tennessee	1
N2	Birmingham	2
S1	Montgomery	2
S2	Biloxi	1

Finals
N2	Birmingham	2
S1	Montgomery	0

== Awards ==
Southern League awards
Award name	Recipient
Most Valuable Player	Matt Shaw, Tennessee Smokies
Pitcher of the Year	Noah Schultz, Birmingham Barons
Top MLB Prospect Award	Carson Williams, Montgomery Biscuits
Manager of the Year	Kevin Bowles, Montgomery Biscuits

== See also ==
- 2024 Major League Baseball season
