= Corey Ray =

American baseball player (born 1994)

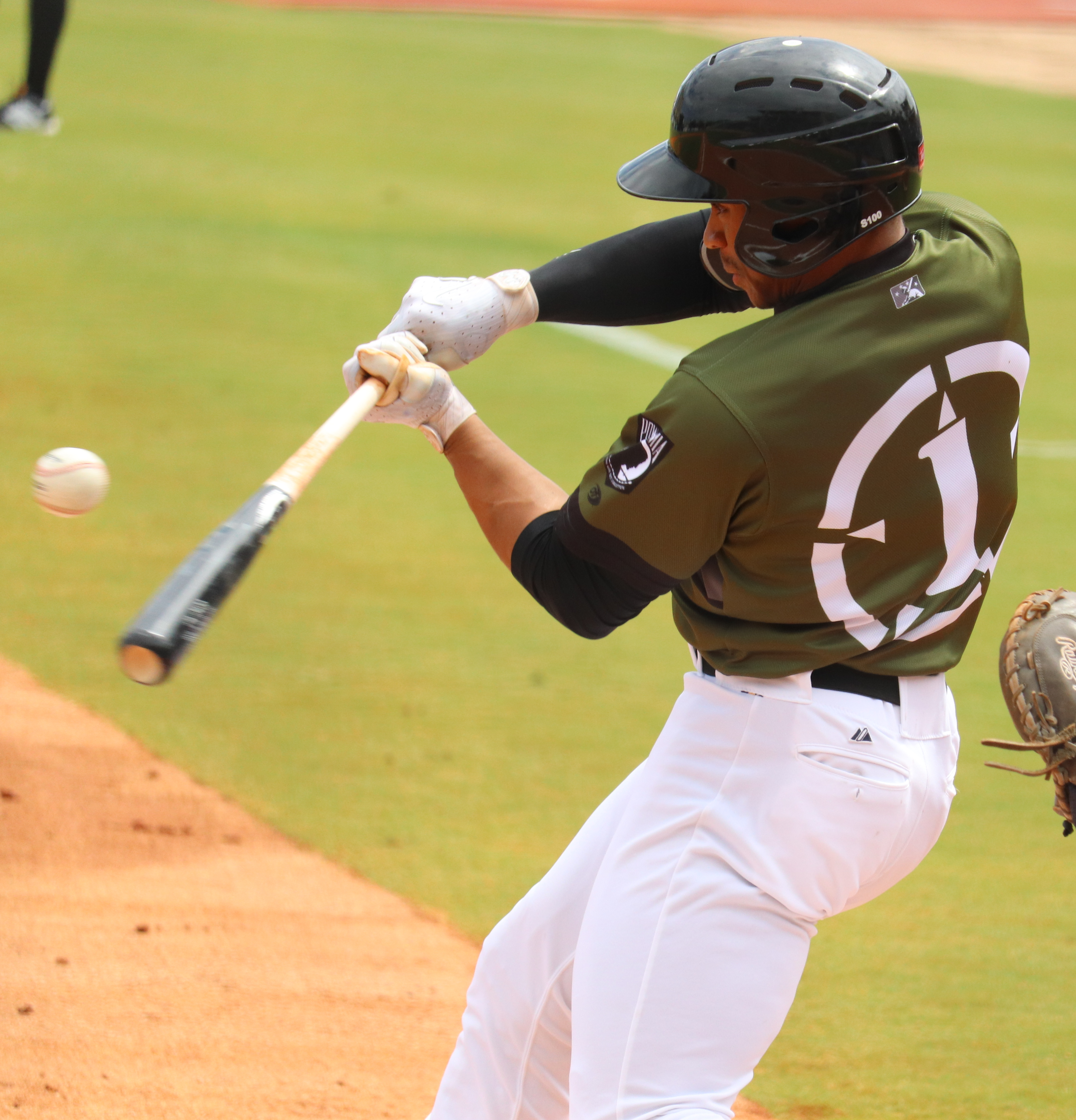
- Ray with the Biloxi Shuckers in 2018

Washington Nationals – No. 23
- Outfielder / Coach
- Born: September 22, 1994 (age 32); Chicago, Illinois, U.S.
- Batted: Left Threw: Left

MLB debut
- April 24, 2021, for the Milwaukee Brewers

Last MLB appearance
- April 24, 2021, for the Milwaukee Brewers

MLB statistics
- Batting average: .000
- Home runs: 0
- Runs batted in: 0
- Stats at Baseball Reference

Teams
- As player: Milwaukee Brewers (2021); As coach: Washington Nationals (2026–present)

Corey Donte Ray (born September 22, 1994) is an American former professional baseball outfielder who currently serves as the first base coach for the Washington Nationals of Major League Baseball (MLB). He played in one game in MLB for the Milwaukee Brewers in 2021.

== Amateur career ==
Ray attended Simeon Career Academy in Chicago, Illinois. In the summer prior to his senior year, he played in the 2012 Under Armour All-American Game. He was drafted by the Seattle Mariners in the 33rd round of the 2013 Major League Baseball draft but did not sign and attended the University of Louisville to play college baseball for the Louisville Cardinals.

Ray appeared in 43 games and made 19 starts as a freshman at Louisville in 2014. He hit .325/.416/.481 with one home run and 17 runs batted in (RBI). After the 2014 season, he played collegiate summer baseball with the Wareham Gatemen of the Cape Cod Baseball League. As a sophomore in 2015, he started all 65 games and hit .325/.389/.543 with 11 home runs, 56 RBI and 34 stolen bases. Against Wake Forest, Ray stole home in the bottom of the ninth inning, to give Louisville the win. After the season, he played for the United States collegiate national team during the summer.

== Professional career ==
In the 2016 Major League Baseball draft, the Milwaukee Brewers selected Ray with the fifth overall selection. He signed and spent his first professional season with both the Brevard County Manatees of the High–A Florida State League and the Wisconsin Timber Rattlers of the Single–A Midwest League, batting .239 with five home runs, 17 RBI, and ten stolen bases in 60 games between both teams. Ray spent 2017 with the Carolina Mudcats of the High–A Carolina League, where he posted a .238 batting average with seven home runs, 48 RBI, and 24 stolen bases in 112 games. He played the 2018 season with the Biloxi Shuckers of the Double–A Southern League. After batting .239 with 27 home runs, 74 RBI and 37 stolen bases, he was awarded the Southern League Most Valuable Player Award. Ray began 2019 with the San Antonio Missions of the Triple–A Pacific Coast League, but missed time during the season due to injury. Over 53 games with San Antonio, he batted .188 with seven home runs and 21 RBI.

On November 20, 2019, the Brewers added Ray to their 40-man roster to protect him from the Rule 5 draft. He did not play in a game in 2020 due to the cancellation of the minor league season because of the COVID-19 pandemic.

On April 24, 2021, Ray was promoted to the major leagues for the first time. He made his MLB debut that day as a pinch hitter for Freddy Peralta, recording a walk, scoring a run, and moving to right field later in the game.

On June 17, 2022, Ray was removed from the 40-man roster and sent outright to the Triple-A Nashville Sounds. In 75 games split between Nashville and Biloxi, he slashed .219/.268/.420 with 13 home runs, 44 RBI, and 10 stolen bases. Ray elected free agency following the season on November 10.

== Coaching career ==
=== Chicago Cubs ===
On March 13, 2023, it was announced that the Chicago Cubs had hired Ray to serve as the bench coach for their Single–A affiliate, the Myrtle Beach Pelicans.

On February 5, 2024, Ray was named the manager of Chicago's rookie–level affiliate, the Arizona Complex League Cubs.

=== Washington Nationals ===
On December 1, 2025, the Washington Nationals hired Ray to serve as their first base coach, replacing Gerardo Parra.
