= Blake Burke =

American baseball player (born 2003)

Milwaukee Brewers
- First baseman/Designated hitter
- Born: June 11, 2003 (age 23); Oakland, California, U.S.
- Bats: Left Throws: Left

Career highlights and awards
- College World Series champion (2024)

Blake William Burke (born June 11, 2003) is an American professional baseball first baseman and designated hitter in the Milwaukee Brewers organization.

== Amateur career ==
Burke grew up in Brentwood, California and attended De La Salle High School in Concord, California. He batted .554 with 32 RBI as a senior. Burke committed to play college baseball at the University of Tennessee.

Burke batted .326 during his freshman season with the Tennessee Volunteers and set a freshman record with 14 home runs. After the season, he played summer collegiate baseball for the Healdsburg Prune Packers of the California Collegiate League. Burke hit .280 with 14 home runs and 43 RBI as a sophomore. During his junior season he set a Tennessee record with a 31-game hitting streak.

== Professional career ==
Burke was drafted by the Milwaukee Brewers in the first round, with the 34th overall selection, of the 2024 Major League Baseball draft. On July 23, 2024, Burke signed with Milwaukee on a $2.1 million contract.

After signing, Burke made his professional debut with the High-A Wisconsin Timber Rattlers and hit .250 across five games. In 2025, he played with Wisconsin and the Double-A Biloxi Shuckers and batted .292 with 16 home runs and 82 RBI across 132 games with both teams. Burke was assigned to Biloxi to begin the 2026 season. There, he led the Southern League with a .970 OPS and tied for the league lead with 30 home runs. Burke was promoted to the Triple-A Nashville Sounds late in the season. He was later selected for the Southern League MVP Award.
