= Andrew Fischer =

American baseball player (born 2004)

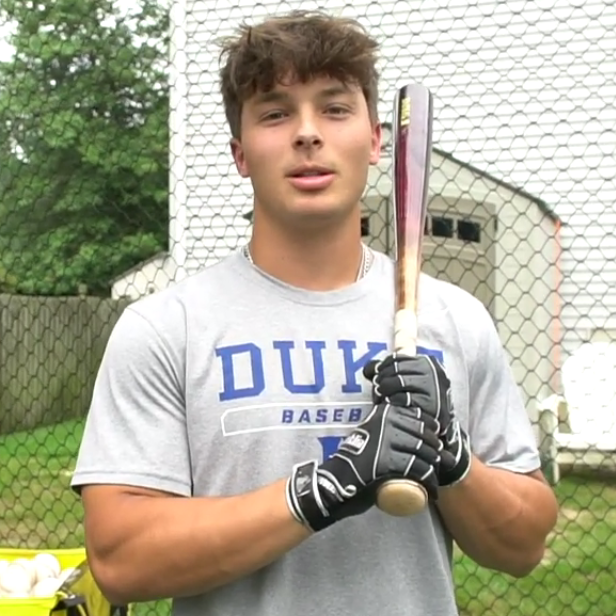
- Fischer in 2021

Milwaukee Brewers
- Third baseman
- Born: May 25, 2004 (age 22); Brick Township, New Jersey, U.S.
- Bats: Left Throws: Right
- Stats at Baseball Reference

Andrew Kenneth Fischer (born May 25, 2004) is an American professional baseball third baseman in the Milwaukee Brewers organization.

== Amateur career ==
Born in Brick Township, New Jersey, Fischer attended Wall High School in Wall Township, New Jersey. He committed to Duke University to play college baseball. In his lone season for the Duke Blue Devils in 2023, he started 45 of 47 games and hit .289/.404/.595 with a school freshman record 11 home runs and 33 runs batted in (RBI). After the season, Fischer transferred to the University of Mississippi. In one year with the Ole Miss Rebels in 2024, he started 55 games at third base and designated hitter and hit .285/.397/.643 with 20 home runs and 57 RBI. In 2024, he played collegiate summer baseball with the Brewster Whitecaps of the Cape Cod Baseball League.

After the 2024 season, Fischer transferred to the University of Tennessee. In his first year for the Tennessee Volunteers in 2025, he was the starting first baseman.

== Professional career ==
Fischer was a top prospect for the 2025 Major League Baseball draft and was selected 20th overall by the Milwaukee Brewers in the first round. He signed with the Brewers for $3.5 million.

Fischer made his professional debut with the High-A Wisconsin Timber Rattlers and hit .311 with one home run across 19 games. He returned to Wisconsin to open the 2026 season.

During the 2026 season he split time between the Wisconsin Timber Rattlers and Biloxi Shuckers. He was named the minor league baseball player of the season by Baseball America for his efforts during the 2026 season where he hit 48 regular season home runs. This was the most home runs hit by a minor league player in a season since Ron Kittle in 1982.

== International career ==
Fischer represented Italy in the 2026 World Baseball Classic. His maternal great-great-grandfather was born in Valle dell'Angelo.
