= Joe Ayrault =

American baseball player (born 1971)

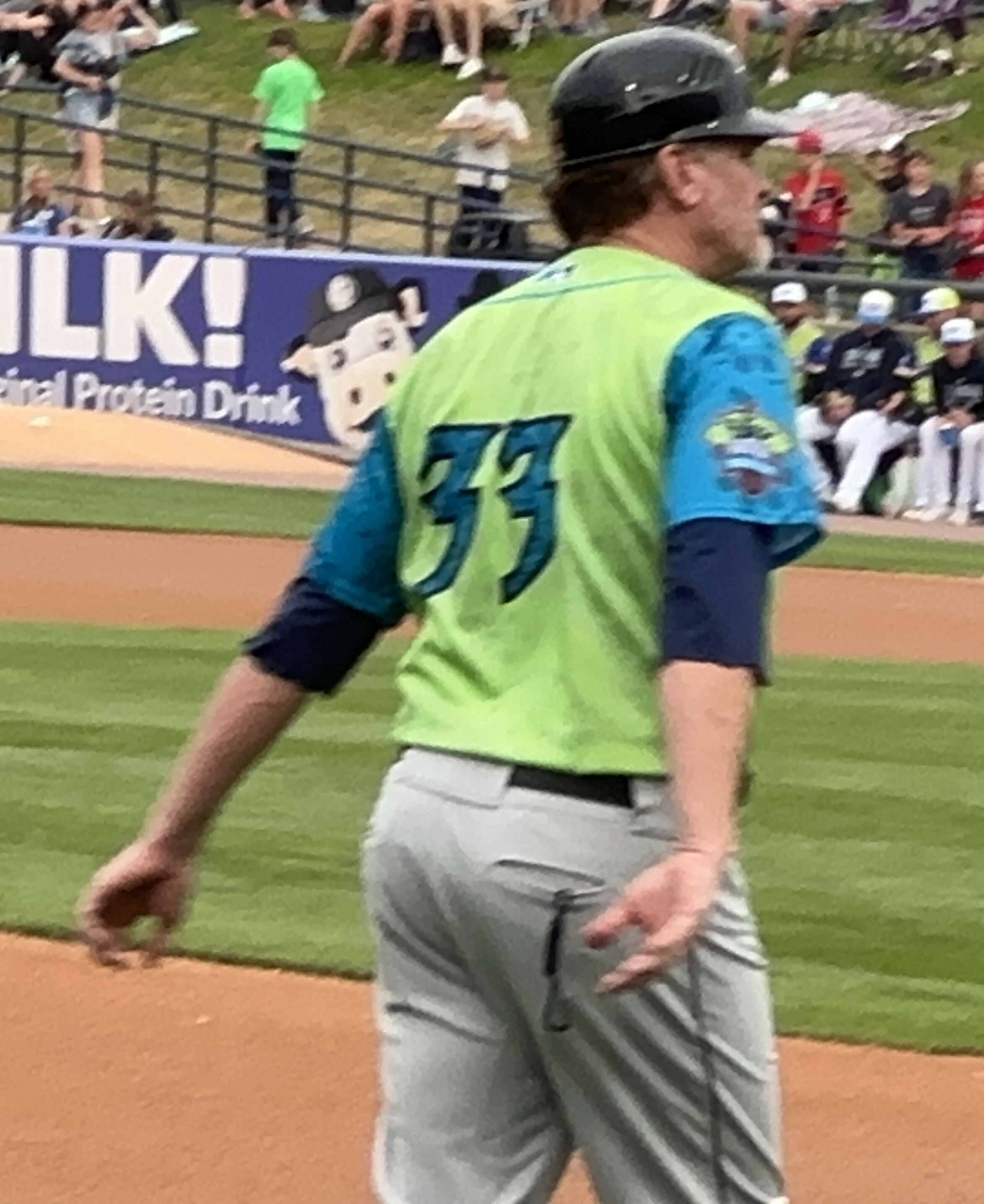
- Ayrault with the Wisconsin Timber Rattlers in 2023
- Catcher
- Born: October 8, 1971 (age 54); Rochester, Michigan, U.S.
- Batted: Right Threw: Right

MLB debut
- September 1, 1996, for the Atlanta Braves

Last MLB appearance
- September 29, 1996, for the Atlanta Braves

MLB statistics
- Batting average: .200
- Home runs: 0
- Runs batted in: 0
- Stats at Baseball Reference

Teams
- Atlanta Braves (1996)

Joseph Allen Ayrault (born October 8, 1971) is an American former professional baseball player. He appeared in seven games in Major League Baseball for the Atlanta Braves as a catcher in 1996. In 2007, he became a minor league manager in the Cincinnati Reds organization. Since 2010, he has managed in the Milwaukee Brewers' minor league system.

== Playing career ==
Ayrault is best known for being included on the postseason roster of the 1996 Braves by manager Bobby Cox despite having had just five major league at bats. He never appeared in a major league game before or after 1996.

== Coaching career ==
In 2007, Ayrault became the manager of the Cincinnati Reds' Rookie Sarasota Reds. In 2010, he joined the Milwaukee Brewers organization as manager of their Rookie League Helena Brewers. Ayrault was promoted to the High-A Brevard County Manatees in 2012. In 2017, he began managing the Carolina Mudcats, which became the Brewers' High-A affiliate at that time. He remained with Carolina through 2021, at which time the team was shifted to Low-A. In 2022, Ayrault was named the manager of the High-A Wisconsin Timber Rattlers. He became manager of the Double-A Biloxi Shuckers in 2024. He was selected as for the Southern League Manager of the Year Award in 2025 with Biloxi.

== Sources ==
- Career statistics from Baseball Reference · Baseball Reference (Minors) · Retrosheet · Baseball Almanac
