= Biloxi Shuckers =

Minor League Baseball team in Biloxi, Mississippi

- Founded in 2015; Biloxi, Mississippi
Team logo
Cap insignia

Minor league affiliations
- Class: Double-A (2015–present)
- League: Southern League (2015–present)
- Division: South Division

Major league affiliations
- Team: Milwaukee Brewers (2015–present)

Minor league titles
- League titles (0): None
- Division titles (4): 2015; 2018; 2019; 2026
- First-half titles (5): 2015; 2018; 2019; 2025; 2026
- Second-half titles (2): 2018; 2019
- Wild card berths (1): 2024

Team data
- Name: Biloxi Shuckers (2015–present)
- Colors: Gulf blue, sand, coral, black
- Mascot: Schooner
- Ballpark: Keesler Federal Park (2015–present)
- Owner/ Operator: Shuckers Baseball
- General manager: Hunter Reed
- Manager: Mike Guerrero
- Media: MiLB.TV and WGCM 1240 AM
- Website: milb.com/biloxi

The Biloxi Shuckers are a Minor League Baseball team of the Southern League and the Double-A affiliate of the Milwaukee Brewers. They are located in Biloxi, Mississippi, and are named in reference to the city's oyster industry and seafood heritage. The Shuckers play their home games at Keesler Federal Park, which opened in 2015.

The Shuckers were established in 2015 after the Southern League's Huntsville Stars relocated to Biloxi following the 2014 season. With Major League Baseball's restructuring of Minor League Baseball in 2021, the team was placed in the Double-A South, which became the Southern League in 2022. Since 2025, the Shuckers have been Mississippi's only affiliated professional baseball club.

Biloxi has played in four Southern League championship series but has not won a league title.

== History ==
=== Before Biloxi ===
Before the arrival of the Shuckers, the only other professional baseball team from Biloxi, Mississippi, was the Gulfport-Biloxi Sand Crabs, who played in the Class C Cotton States League in 1907. The Shuckers came to the city 108 years later by way of Nashville, Tennessee, and Huntsville, Alabama. In 1978, the Nashville Sounds began play as an expansion team of the Double-A Southern League. In 1984, Sounds president Larry Schmittou and other members of the team's ownership group purchased the Evansville Triplets of the Triple-A American Association with plans to move the team from Evansville, Indiana, to Nashville for the 1985 season. The Southern League wanted Schmittou to surrender his franchise to the league, but he had plans to relocate the Double-A team instead. After a move to Evansville was denied, the City of Huntsville agreed to build a new ballpark, Joe W. Davis Stadium, which lured the franchise to town where it began play as the Huntsville Stars in 1985.

Twenty-nine years later, following several failed attempts to replace Huntsville's aging ballpark, the Stars were sold to Biloxi Baseball, under the leadership of majority owner Ken Young, in January 2014. Previous owner Miles Prentice and other shareholders retained a minority stake in the team. The franchise remained in Huntsville until the end of the 2014 season while a new ballpark could be constructed in Biloxi.

=== Milwaukee Brewers (2015–present) ===
The relocated Biloxi team continued to compete in the Double-A Southern League as an affiliate of the Milwaukee Brewers Major League Baseball (MLB) team, continuing the relationship between Milwaukee and Huntsville that had been in place since 1999. The club's new moniker was selected by fans in a name-the-team contest. Among the finalists were "Shrimpers", "Black Jacks", "Beacon", "Mullets", and "Schooners". The chosen name, "Biloxi Shuckers", celebrates the city's heritage as a center for the oyster and seafood industries. Their primary logo utilizes a color palette of gulf blue, sand, coral, and black and features an open oyster with a pair of eyes along with the team name.

Due to construction delays at Biloxi's 6,000-seat MGM Park in Biloxi, the Shuckers played the first 54 games of their inaugural 2015 season on the road. These included several games originally planned to be held in Biloxi for which the Shuckers were designated the "home" team in their opponents' ballparks. Fifteen games were played at Joe W. Davis Stadium in Huntsville, but under the Shuckers name, not that of the old Stars.

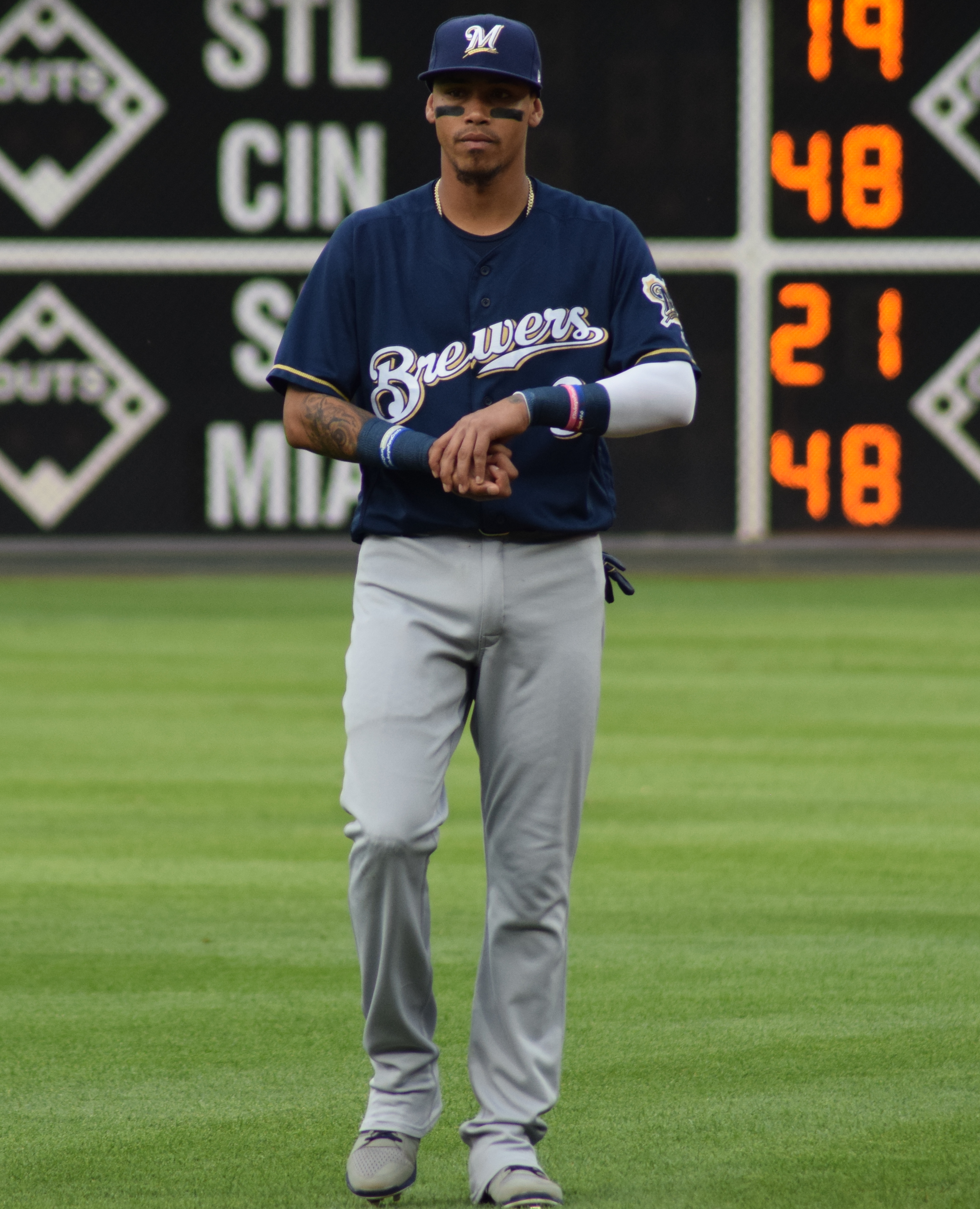
Orlando Arcia drove in three runs in the Shuckers' first game on April 9, 2015, a 4–0 win.

The Shuckers played their first game on April 9, 2015, against the Pensacola Blue Wahoos at Admiral Fetterman Field in Pensacola, Florida, which they won, 4–0. Orlando Arcia led the scoring with three runs batted in, while the Shuckers' pitching staff held their opponents to three hits and struck out nine batters. The team's MGM Park home opener was played on June 6 versus the Mobile BayBears, a 4–3 victory. Going into extra innings, Nick Shaw singled home Brent Suter from second base in the bottom of the fourteenth inning to secure the win. The inaugural home opener was attended by 5,065 people.

The Southern League uses a split-season schedule wherein the division winners from each half qualify for the postseason championship playoffs. Biloxi won the First Half South Division title, earning them a berth in the postseason. In the best-of-five division series, they defeated second-half winners Pensacola, 3–0, to win the South Division title and advance to the championship finals. There, they lost to the Chattanooga Lookouts, 3–2, in a series that went the full five games. Overall, the Shuckers finished their first season with a league-best 78–59 record. Jorge López won the Southern League Most Outstanding Pitcher Award with a league-leading 1.10 WHIP and a .205 opponents' batting average while tying for the lead with 12 wins. Manager Carlos Subero was selected as the Southern League Manager of the Year.

On April 2, 2016, the Shuckers hosted an exhibition game against the Milwaukee Brewers, a 7–4 loss attended by 5,152 people. Brewers appearing in the game included Ryan Braun, Domingo Santana, Jonathan Villar, Martín Maldonado, and Chase Anderson. This was the first time a major league team played in Biloxi since the 1938 Philadelphia Phillies held spring training at Biloxi Stadium. Under manager Mike Guerrero, the 2016 Shuckers finished with a 72–67 record but did not win either half of the season.

Shuckers pitchers threw the first no-hitter in franchise history on August 14, 2017. Hiram Burgos (2 IP), Forrest Snow (3 IP), Nick Ramirez (1 IP), and Jorge López (1 IP) combined for the effort in the second game of a seven-inning doubleheader against the Tennessee Smokies at MGM Park, a 1–0 win. The team missed the postseason with a 71–66 campaign.

Biloxi won both the First and Second Half South Division titles in 2018 on the way to a league-best 81–59 record. They beat Pensacola, 3–1, to win the South Division title before being defeated in the finals by the Jackson Generals, 3–1. Though the team was denied their first league championship, they swept the major Southern League awards that season, winning all three. Southern League Most Valuable Player Corey Ray led the league in home runs (27), stolen bases (35), and doubles (32) at the time of his selection. Zack Brown won the Most Outstanding Pitcher Award after leading the circuit with a 2.48 earned run average. Third-year manager Mike Guerrero rounded out the honors, winning Manager of the Year.

The Shuckers hosted the Southern League All-Star Game at MGM Park on June 18, 2019. The North Division All-Stars defeated the South Division All-Stars, 7–3, with 4,209 people on hand. Luis Robert of the Birmingham Barons was selected as the game's Most Valuable Player. Jeffrey Baez of the Jackson Generals won the previous day's Home Run Derby.

Like the previous season, Guerrero led the 2019 Shuckers to win both halves of the season with an overall record of 82–57, second overall in the league. They bested Pensacola, 3–2, for the South Division title, but they were again defeated by Jackson in the finals, 3–2. Trey Supak, who led the Southern League with 11 wins, a 0.87 WHIP, and a .192 opponents' batting average at the time of his July 26 promotion to the Triple-A San Antonio Missions, was selected as the league's Most Outstanding Pitcher.

The start of the 2020 season was postponed due to the COVID-19 pandemic before being cancelled on June 30. Following the 2020 season, Major League Baseball assumed control of Minor League Baseball in a move to increase player salaries, modernize facility standards, and reduce travel. As a result, the Southern League disbanded and the Shuckers were placed in the Double-A South. Biloxi's 2021 opener in the new league, scheduled for May 4 on the road versus the Birmingham Barons at Regions Field, was postponed due to inclement weather. The game was made up the next evening as part of a doubleheader, both games of which the Shuckers lost, 6–1 and 2–1. On May 15, pitchers Ethan Small (5 IP), Zach Vennaro (1 IP), Nathan Kirby (2 IP), and Matt Hardy (1 IP) tossed a combined no-hitter against the Mississippi Braves in a 1–0 win at MGM Park. They ended the season in fourth place in the Southern Division at 45–69.

In 2022, the Double-A South became known as the Southern League, the name historically used by the regional circuit prior to the 2021 reorganization. The Shuckers finished the first half of the season in second place, two-and-a-half games behind the division winner. They placed further back in the second half, and posted an overall record of 67–68. Catcher Jakson Reetz was chosen for the Southern League MVP Award.

In February 2023, Ken Young, the managing partner of Biloxi Baseball, sold the franchise to Shuckers Baseball, which is owned and operated by John Tracy. The team did not win either half of the 2023 season and had a composite record of 74–63. Carlos Rodríguez was selected for the 2023 SL Pitcher of the Year Award.

The Shuckers' MGM Park became known as Keesler Federal Park in 2024 in a corprorate naming rights agreement with Keesler Federal Credit Union. Biloxi posted a 66–69 season record. They finished the second half in second-place behind the first-half champion Montgomery Biscuits, earning them playoff berth. The Shuckers lost the Southern Division title to Montgomery, 2–1. Biloxi finished the 2025 season with a 74–64 record and qualified for the playoffs by winning the First-Half Southern Division title. In a rematch of the previous postseason's division series, they faced Montgomery but were swept, 2–0. Joe Ayrault was selected for the league's Manager of the Year Award.

Biloxi won the 2026 first-half title with a 35–30 record, qualifying them for the Southern League championship playoffs. They defeated the Pensacola Blue Wahoos for the Southern Division title, 2–0, but were beaten by the Rocket City Trash Pandas, 2–1, for the league championship. Overall, the Shuckers went 66–68 on the season. First baseman Blake Burke won the SL MVP Award, and shortstop Jesús Made won the league's Top MLB Prospect Award.

As of the completion of the 2026 season, the team has played 1,485 regular-season games and compiled a win–loss record of 776–709. They have a postseason record of 18–18. Combining all 1,521 regular-season and postseason games, Biloxi has an all-time record of 794–727.

== Season-by-season records ==
Table key
League	The team's final position in the league standings
Division	The team's final position in the divisional standings
GB	Games behind the team that finished in first place in the division that season
†	League champions (2015–present)
*	Division champions (2015–present)
^	Postseason berth (2015–present)

Season-by-season records
Season	League	Regular-season					Postseason			MLB affiliate	Ref.
Season	League	Record	Win %	League	Division	GB	Record	Win %	Result	MLB affiliate	Ref.
2015^ *	SL	78–59	.569	1st	1st	—	5–3	.625	Result	Won First-Half Southern Division title Won Southern Division title vs. Pensacola Blue Wahoos, 3–0; Lost SL championship vs. Chattanooga Lookouts, 3–2	Milwaukee Brewers
2016	SL	72–67	.518	6th	3rd	8 1/2	—	—	—	Milwaukee Brewers	
2017	SL	71–66	.518	4th	2nd	1 1/2	—	—	—	Milwaukee Brewers	
2018^ *	SL	81–59	.579	1st	1st	—	4–4	.500	Won First and Second-Half Southern Division titles Won Southern Division title vs. Pensacola Blue Wahoos, 3–1; Lost SL championship vs. Jackson Generals, 3–1	Milwaukee Brewers	
2019^ *	SL	82–57	.590	2nd	1st	—	5–5	.500	Won First and Second-Half Southern Division titles Won Southern Division title vs. Pensacola Blue Wahoos, 3–2; Lost SL championship vs. Jackson Generals, 3–2	Milwaukee Brewers	
2020	SL	Season cancelled (COVID-19 pandemic)								Milwaukee Brewers	
2021	AAS	45–69	.395	8th	4th	23 1/2	—	—	—	Milwaukee Brewers	
2022	SL	67–68	.496	5th	3rd	5	—	—	—	Milwaukee Brewers	
2023	SL	74–63	.540	4th	3rd	5	—	—	—	Milwaukee Brewers	
2024^	SL	66–69	.489	5th	3rd	—	1–2	.333	Won Second-Half Southern Division wild card Lost Southern Division title vs. Montgomery Biscuits, 2–1	Milwaukee Brewers	
2025^	SL	74–64	.536	4th	2nd	4	0–2	.000	Won First-Half Southern Division title Lost Southern Division title vs. Montgomery Biscuits, 2–0	Milwaukee Brewers	
2026^ *	SL	66–68	.493	5th	3rd	11 1/2	3–2	.600	Won First-Half Southern Division title Won Southern Division title vs. Pensacola Blue Wahoos, 2–0; Lost SL championship vs. Rocket City Trash Pandas, 2–1	Milwaukee Brewers	
Totals	—	776–709	.523	—	—	—	18–18	.500	—	—	—

== Radio and television ==
All home and road games are broadcast on WGCM AM 1240 (100.9 FM) and across the Biloxi Shuckers Radio Network. Live audio broadcasts are also available online through the team's website and the MiLB First Pitch and TuneIn radio apps. All home and road games can be viewed through the MiLB.TV subscription feature of the official website of Minor League Baseball, with audio provided by a radio simulcast. Javik Blake has been the primary play-by-play broadcaster since 2023.

== Mascot ==
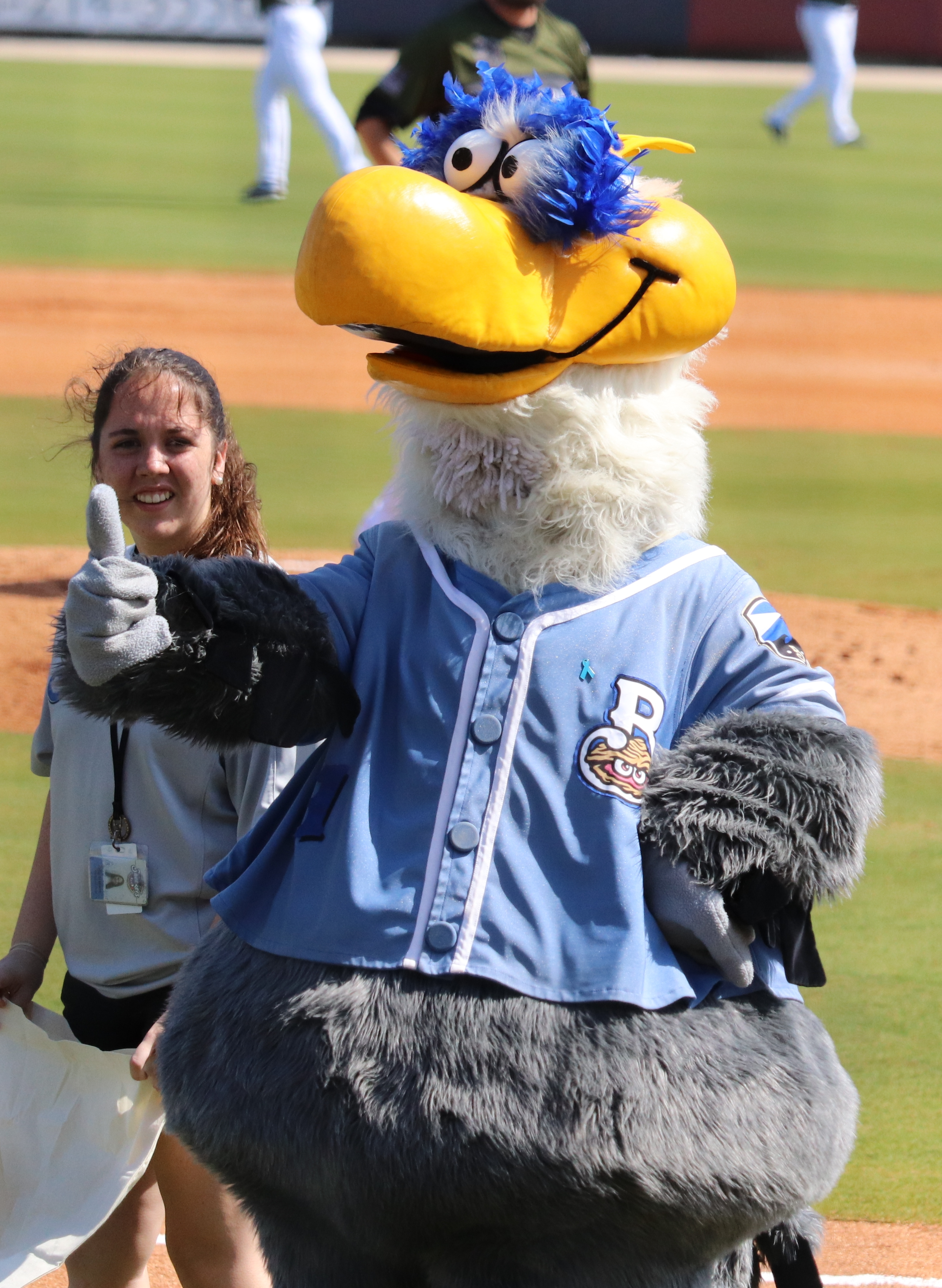
Schooner, the team mascot

The Shuckers' mascot is an anthropomorphic seagull named Schooner. He is gray with a white neck and has blue feathers around his eyes and a yellow beak and legs. Schooner wears the same blue jerseys as the team with the number one and blue and white sneakers. He made his debut on April 2, 2016, during an exhibition game against the Milwaukee Brewers prior to the Shuckers' first full season at MGM Park.

== Roster ==
Biloxi Shuckers roster
Players	Coaches/Other
Pitchers: 53 Ryan Birchard; 16 Jesús Broca; 14 Stiven Cruz; 30 Jaron DeBerry; 17 Anthony Flores; 21 Yorman Galindez; 22 Sam Garcia; 36 Garrett Hodges; 22 Josh Knoth; 31 Bishop Letson; 54 Nick Merkel; 27 Peyton Niksch; 38 Braylon Owens; 20 Joshua Quezada; 28 Manuel Rodriguez; 19 Jack Seppings; 26 Travis Smith; 15 J.D. Thompson; 33 Wande Torres; Catchers: 1 Marco Dinges; 10 David García ~; 29 Darrien Miller; 24 Matthew Wood; Infielders: 6 Josh Adamczewski; 39 Eric Bitonti; 3 Mike Boeve; 9 Daniel Dickinson; 25 Andrew Fischer; 12 Jesús Made; 11 Dylan O'Rae; 1 Luis Peña; 4 Jheremy Vargas; Outfielders: 18 Mark Coley II; 5 Damon Keith; 2 Braylon Payne	Manager: 13 Mike Guerrero; Coaches: 8 Matt Lipka; 7 Kevin Martir (hitting); 37 Josh Spence (pitching); 23 Tyson Cooper (associate); 60-day injured list: 66 Tyler Bryant (full season); -- Chase Costello (full season); -- Tanner Gillis; 7-day injured list; * On Milwaukee Brewers 40-man roster; ~ Development list; # Rehab assignment; ∞ Reserve list; ‡ Restricted list; § Suspended list; † Temporarily inactive list; Roster updated September 20, 2026; Transactions; → More rosters: MiLB • Southern League; → Milwaukee Brewers minor league players

== Achievements ==
=== Awards ===
Eight players, three managers, and one executives have won Southern League awards in recognition for their performance with the Shuckers.

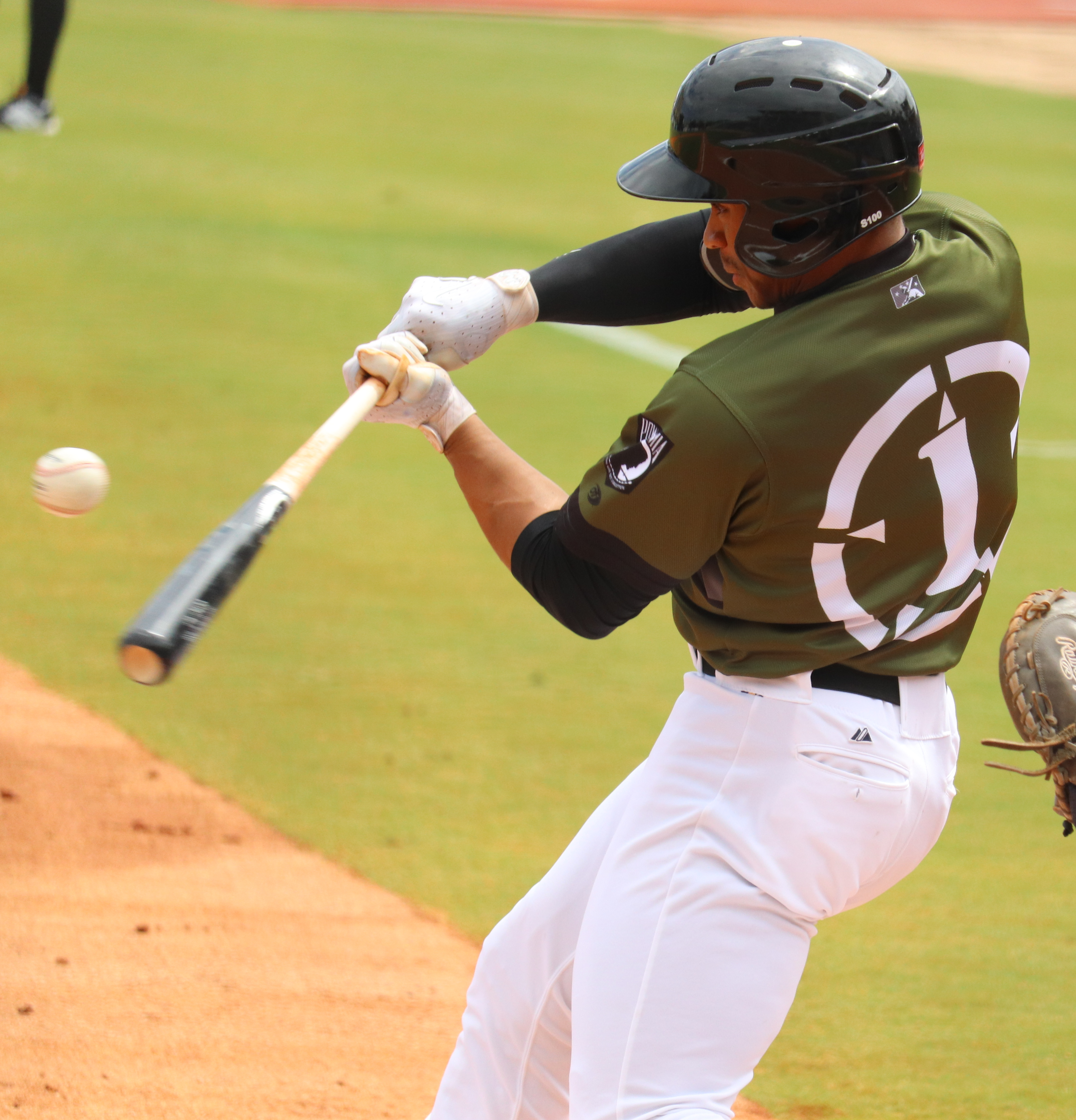
Corey Ray won the 2018 Southern League Most Valuable Player Award.

Award	Recipient	Season	Ref.
Most Valuable Player	Corey Ray	2018	
Most Valuable Player	Jakson Reetz	2022	
Most Valuable Player	Blake Burke	2026	
Most Outstanding Pitcher	Jorge López	2015	
Most Outstanding Pitcher	Zack Brown	2018	
Most Outstanding Pitcher	Trey Supak	2019	
Pitcher of the Year	Carlos Rodríguez	2023	
Top MLB Prospect	Jesús Made	2026	
Manager of the Year	Carlos Subero	2015	
Manager of the Year	Mike Guerrero	2018	
Manager of the Year	Joe Ayrault	2025	
Woman of Excellence	Kelsey Thompson	2019	

=== Postseason All-Stars ===
Twenty-one players have been named to the Southern League Postseason All-Star Team. Nate Griep is the only Shucker to be selected twice.

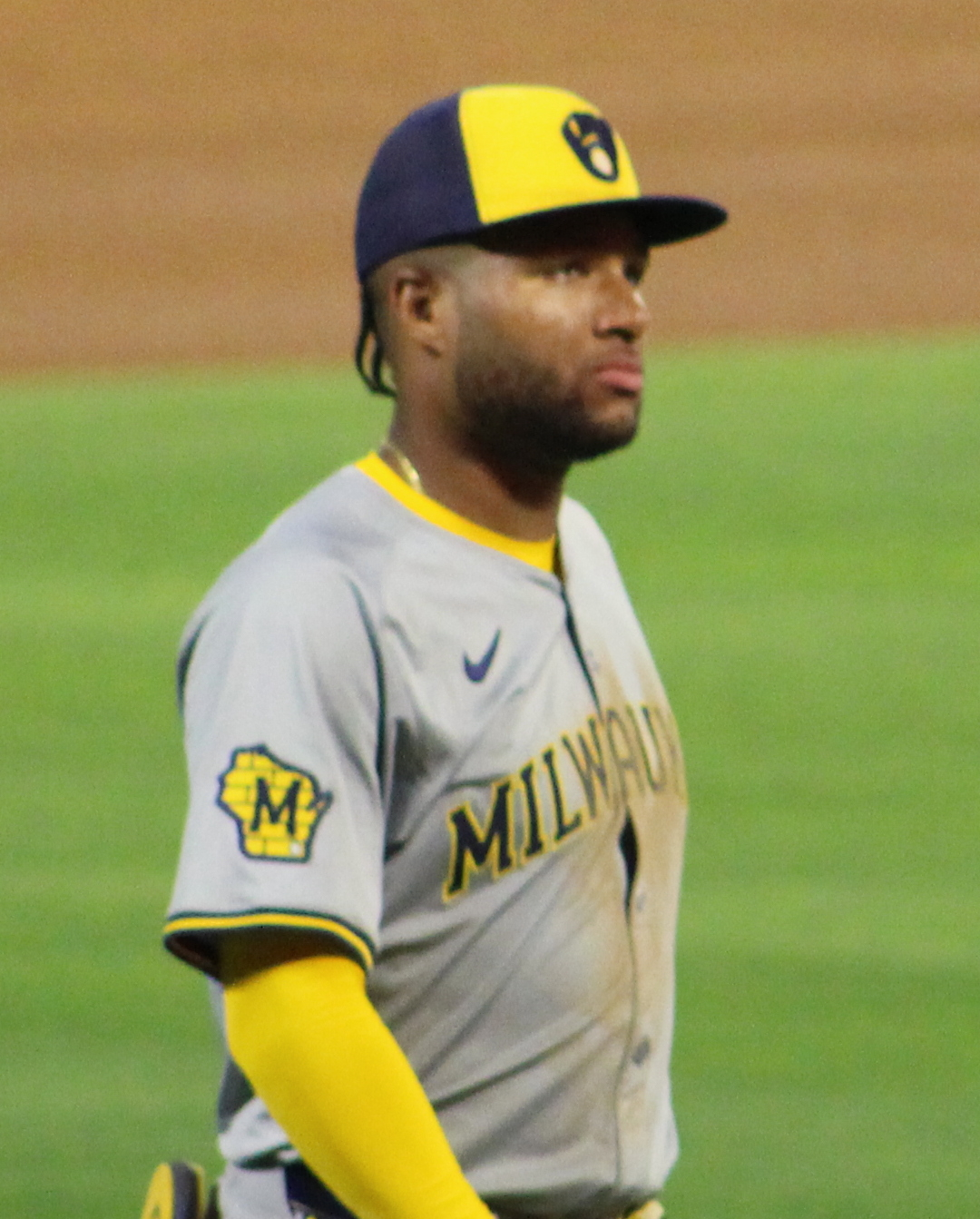
Jackson Chourio was named to the 2023 SL Postseason All-Star Team as an outfielder.

Season	Player	Position	Ref.
2015	Orlando Arcia	Shortstop	
2015	Jorge López	Right-handed pitcher	
2017	Johnny Davis	Best hustler	
2018	Zack Brown	Right-handed pitcher	
2018	Nate Griep	Relief pitcher	
2018	Corey Ray	Outfielder	
2019	Nate Griep	Relief pitcher	
2019	Patrick Leonard	First baseman	
2019	Trey Supak	Right-handed pitcher	
2022	Jakson Reetz	Catcher	
2023	Tyler Black	Utility player	
2023	Jackson Chourio	Outfielder	
2023	Jeferson Quero	Catcher	
2023	Carlos Rodríguez	Starting pitcher	
2024	Ernesto Martinez Jr.	First baseman	
2024	Blake Holub	Relief pitcher	
2025	Luke Adams	First baseman	
2025	Brock Wilken	Designated hitter	
2026	Josh Adamczewski	Outfielder	
2026	Blake Burke	First baseman	
2026	Andrew Fischer	Third baseman	
2026	Jesús Made	Shortstop	

== Managers ==
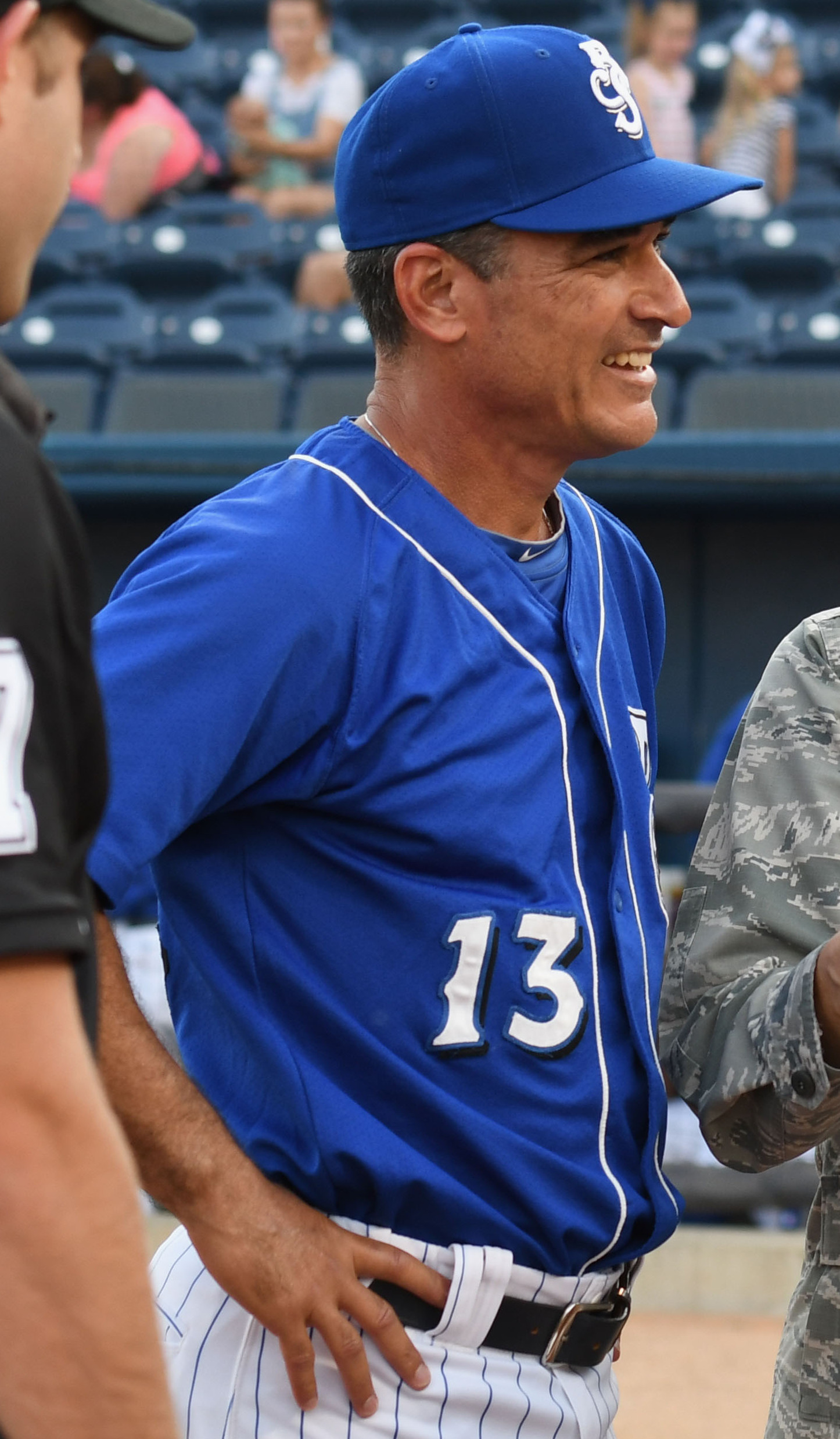
Mike Guerrero has managed the Shuckers since 2026 after previously leading the team from 2016 to 2023.

Biloxi has had three managers since their inaugural 2015 season.

No.	Manager	Season(s)	Ref.
1	Carlos Subero	2015	
2	Mike Guerrero	2016–2023	
3	Joe Ayrault	2024–2025	
—	Mike Guerrero	2026–present	
