= Jesús Made =

Dominican baseball player (born 2007)

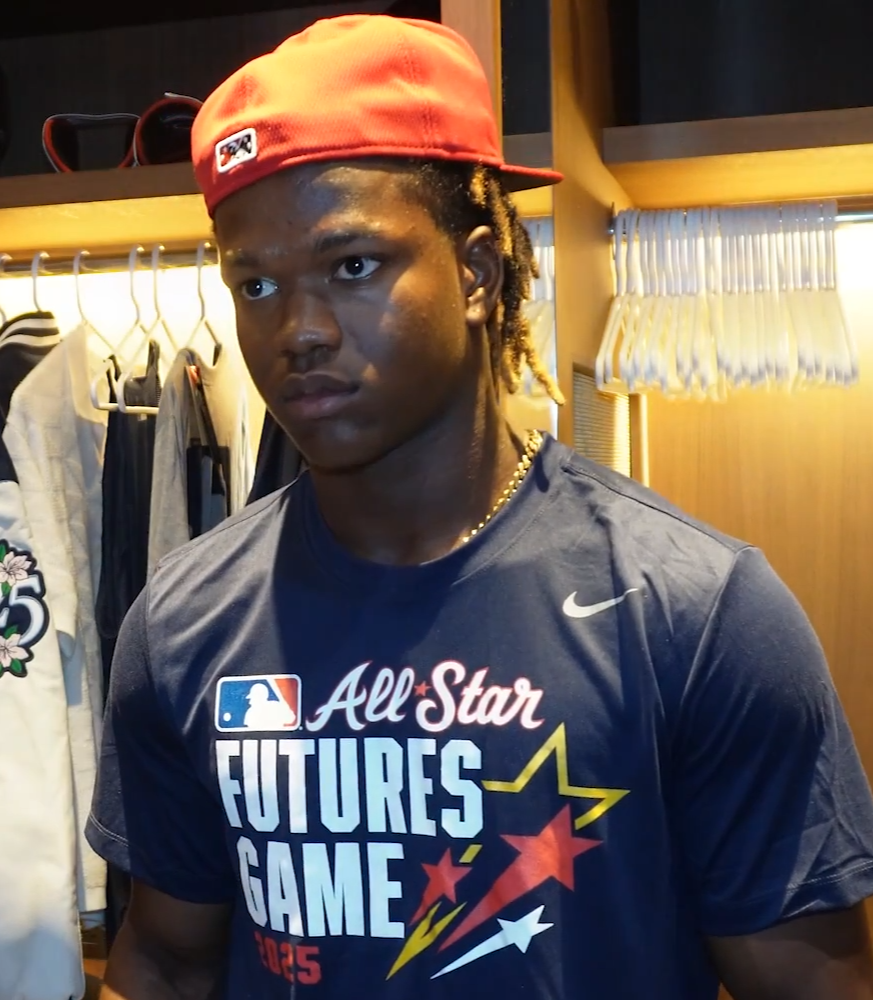
- Made at Truist Park for the 2025 All-Star Futures Game

Milwaukee Brewers
- Shortstop / Third baseman
- Born: May 8, 2007 (age 19); San Cristobal, Dominican Republic
- Bats: Switch Throws: Right
- Stats at Baseball Reference

Jesús Alexander Made (born May 8, 2007) is a Dominican professional baseball shortstop and third baseman in the Milwaukee Brewers organization.

== Career ==
Made signed with the Milwaukee Brewers as an international free agent in January 2024. He made his professional debut that season with the Dominican Summer League Brewers, hitting .331/.458/.554 with six home runs, 28 runs batted in, and 28 stolen bases over 51 games.

Made was ranked as the Brewers' top prospect entering the 2025 season. He opened the season playing with the Single-A Carolina Mudcats. He was selected to play in the All-Star Futures Game in July.

At just 18 years old, Made was part of the Brewers' 2026 spring training roster, where he became locker mates with Jackson Chourio. As of May 14, 2026, Made is considered the #1 prospect in baseball according to MLB.com. Assigned to the Double-A Biloxi Shuckers, Made led the Southern League with 87 runs and 91 RBI. He was selected for the 2026 Southern League Top MLB Prospect Award.
