= Keesler Federal Credit Union =

Credit union in Mississippi

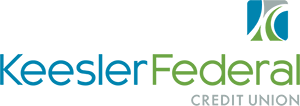
- Type: Credit union
- Industry: Financial services
- Founded: 1947
- Headquarters: Biloxi, Mississippi, United States
- Area served: Louisiana, Mississippi, Alabama
- Key people: Andrew Swoger, President / CEO
- Products: Savings; checking; consumer loans; mortgages; credit cards
- Total assets: $4.3B USD (November 2022)
- Number of employees: 800
- Website: kfcu.org

Keesler Federal Credit Union is a credit union headquartered in Biloxi, Mississippi, chartered and regulated under the authority of the National Credit Union Administration (NCUA) of the U.S. federal government. Keesler is the largest credit union in Mississippi and has branches for Air Force personnel stationed in the United Kingdom from the Keesler Federal Credit Union Website As of November 2022, Keesler Federal had over $4.3 billion in assets, approximately 303,000 members, and 39 branches.

Keesler Federal was founded in 1947 to serve military personnel at the Keesler Air Force Base in Biloxi, Mississippi. The credit union suffered tremendous damage during Hurricane Katrina in 2005. Keesler has won the Credit Union National Association's Dora Maxwell Social Responsibility Award on multiple occasions.
