= Jakson Reetz =

American baseball player (born 1996)

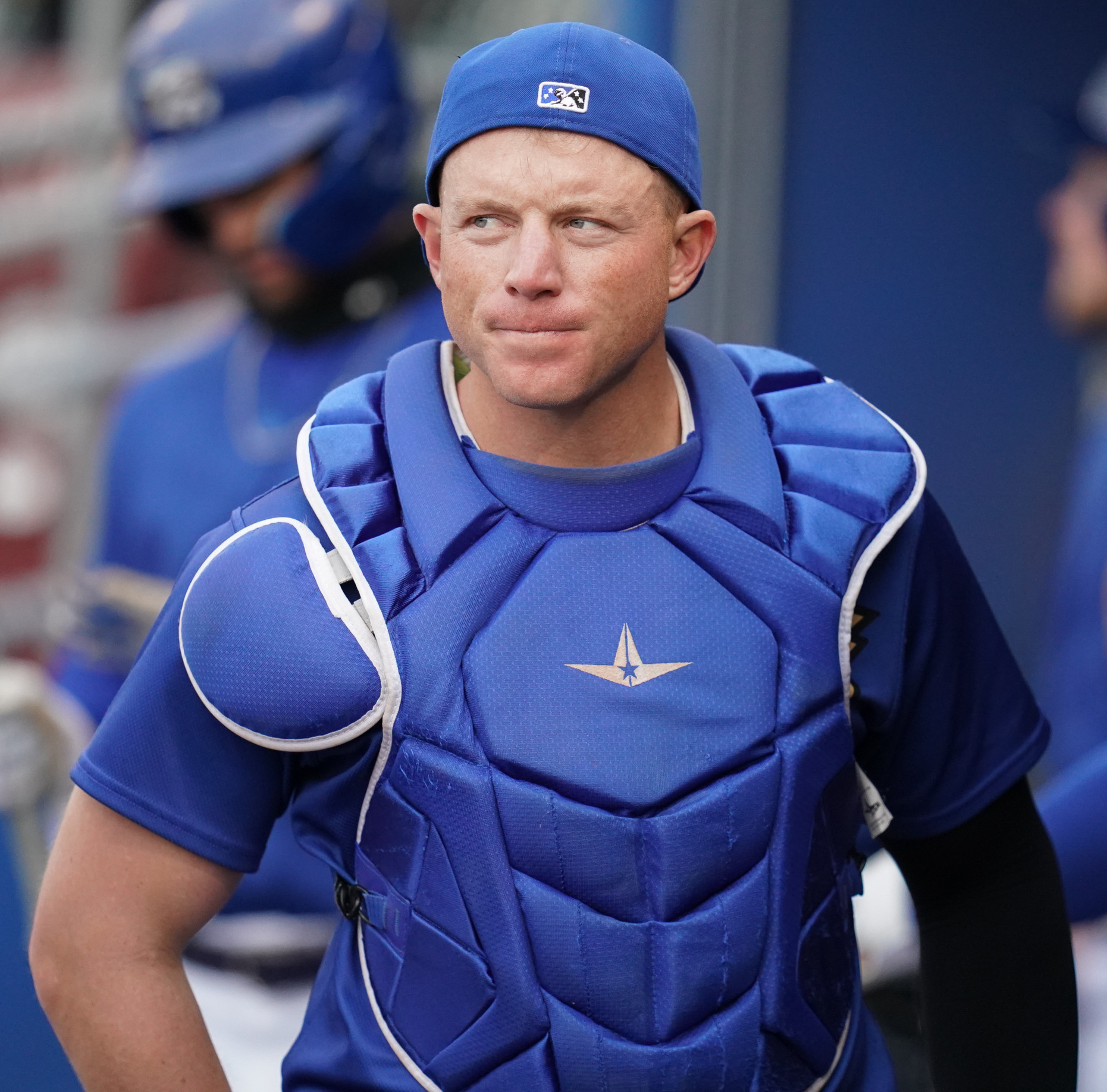
- Reetz with the Omaha Storm Chasers in 2023

Free agent
- Catcher
- Born: January 3, 1996 (age 30); Hickman, Nebraska, U.S.
- Bats: Right Throws: Right

MLB debut
- July 10, 2021, for the Washington Nationals

MLB statistics (through 2024 season)
- Batting average: .188
- Home runs: 1
- Runs batted in: 1
- Stats at Baseball Reference

Teams
- Washington Nationals (2021); San Francisco Giants (2024)
Medals
Men's baseball
Representing United States
18U Baseball World Cup
Gold medal – first place	2013 Taichung	Team

Jakson Dale Reetz (born January 3, 1996) is an American professional baseball catcher who is a free agent. He has previously played in Major League Baseball (MLB) for the Washington Nationals and San Francisco Giants.

== Career ==
=== Amateur career ===
Reetz attended Norris High School in Firth, Nebraska. In high school, Reetz played for the United States national under-18 baseball team.

=== Washington Nationals ===
The Washington Nationals selected Reetz in the third round of the 2014 Major League Baseball draft. He chose to turn pro and signed with the Nationals, who drafted him with the 93rd overall pick. He made his professional debut with the rookie-level GCL Nationals, hitting .274 in 43 games. In 2015, Reetz played for the Low-A Auburn Doubledays, batting .212/.326/.248 in 36 games. The following year, Reetz played in Single-A with the Hagerstown Suns, posting a .230/.346/.357 slash line with 4 home runs and 38 RBI. For the 2017 season, Reetz split the year between Hagerstown and the High-A Potomac Nationals, accumulating a .237/.337/.355 batting line with 4 home runs and 22 RBI. He returned to Potomac in 2018, slashing .224/.342/.323 with 5 home runs and 27 RBI in 69 games. Reetz played for Potomac for a third straight season in 2019, and batted .252/.370/.441 with career-highs in home runs (13) and RBI (55).

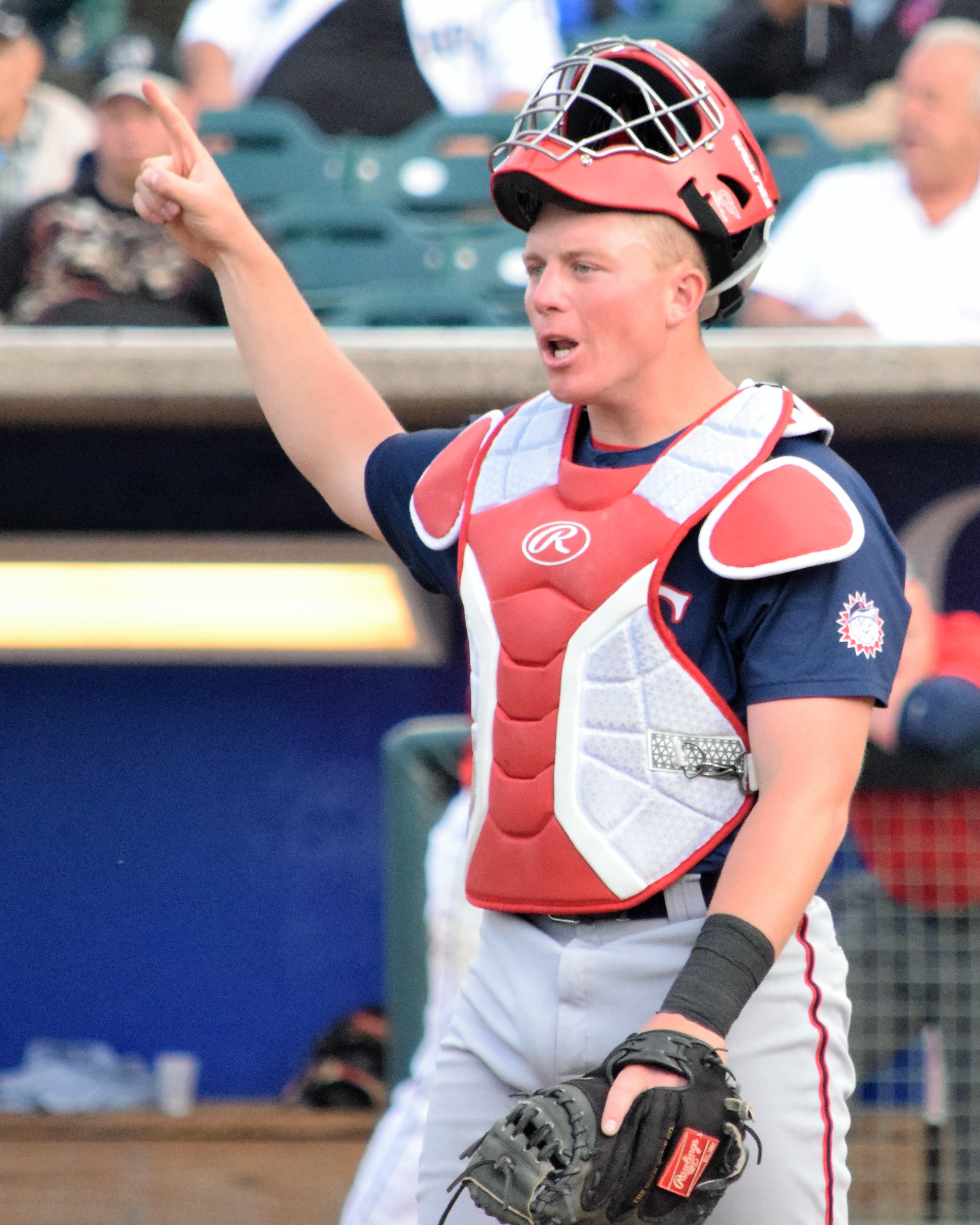
Reetz with the Hagerstown Suns in 2016

After parts of six seasons in the Nationals organization, Reetz was invited to spring training in 2020 with the major league team. Reetz was also part of the team's 60-man player pool during the shortened season that year, but did not play in a game due to the cancellation of the minor league season because of the COVID-19 pandemic. He was subsequently invited to major league spring training in 2021, although he did not make the team.

Reetz was promoted to Triple-A minor league baseball for the first time in July 2021, advancing from the Double-A Harrisburg Senators to the Rochester Red Wings. Days later, on July 10, the Nationals selected his contract and promoted him to the major leagues for the first time, following an injury to primary catcher Yan Gomes. He made his major league debut the same day, doubling off San Francisco Giants reliever John Brebbia in his first career at-bat and scoring a run. Reetz was designated for assignment by the Nationals on September 22.

=== Milwaukee Brewers ===
On December 9, 2021, Reetz signed a minor league contract with the Milwaukee Brewers. Reetz was added to the 40-man roster on August 4, 2022, and subsequently designated for assignment on August 18. He cleared waivers and declined an outright assignment, becoming a free agent.

=== Kansas City Royals ===
On August 25, 2022, Reetz signed a minor league contract with the Kansas City Royals. After the season, he was chosen for the Southern League Most Valuable Player Award for his time playing for the Brewers' Double–A affiliate. He elected free agency following the season on November 10.

On December 13, 2022, Reetz re-signed with the Royals on a new minor league deal. In 2023, Reetz played in 27 games for the Triple–A Omaha Storm Chasers, hitting .274/.349/.526 with 4 home runs and 15 RBI. He opted out of his contract and was released by the Royals on June 16, 2023.

=== San Francisco Giants ===
On June 27, 2023, Reetz signed a minor league contract with the San Francisco Giants organization. In 55 games for the Triple–A Sacramento River Cats, he batted .227/.338/.487 with 13 home runs and 42 RBI. Reetz elected free agency following the season on November 6.

On December 7, 2023, Reetz re–signed with the Giants on a new minor league deal. He returned to Sacramento, playing in 15 games and hitting .217 with two home runs and nine RBI. On May 5, 2024, the Giants selected Reetz' contract, adding him to the major league roster. He played in 5 games for San Francisco, going 1–for–12 (.083) with one home run and one RBI. On May 24, Reetz was designated for assignment following the signing of Drew Pomeranz. He cleared waivers and was sent outright to Sacramento on May 31. On August 6, the Giants selected Reetz's contract, adding him back to their active roster. He was designated for assignment on August 23, following the signing of Andrew Knapp. Reetz cleared waivers for a second time on August 27, and was again sent outright to Sacramento. He elected free agency on October 1.

=== New York Mets ===
On November 22, 2024, Reetz signed a minor league contract with the New York Mets. In 43 appearances for the Triple-A Syracuse Mets, he batted .197/.287/.470 with 11 home runs and 26 RBI. Reetz was released by the Mets organization on July 17, 2025.

=== Baltimore Orioles ===
On July 29, 2025, Reetz signed a minor league contract with the Baltimore Orioles. He made 22 appearances for the Triple-A Norfolk Tides, slashing .180/.346/.246 with five RBI and two stolen bases. Reetz elected free agency following the season on November 6.

=== Seattle Mariners ===
On January 24, 2026, Reetz signed a minor league contract with the Seattle Mariners that included an invitation to spring training. In 45 games with Triple-A Tacoma Rainiers he batted .250/.343/.349 with 3 home runs and 14 RBIs. He elected free agency on November 2.
