= Carolina Mudcats =

- 1991–2025; Zebulon, North Carolina
Team logo
Cap insignia

Minor league affiliations
- Class: Single-A (2021–2025); Class A-Advanced (2012–2020); Double-A (1991–2011)
- League: Carolina League (2012–2025); Southern League (1991–2011)

Major league affiliations
- Team: Milwaukee Brewers (2017–2025); Atlanta Braves (2015–2016); Cleveland Indians (2012–2014); Cincinnati Reds (2009–2011); Florida Marlins (2003–2008); Colorado Rockies (1999–2002); Pittsburgh Pirates (1991–1998)

Minor league titles
- League titles (2): 1995; 2003
- Division titles (4): 1994; 1995; 2003; 2008
- First-half titles (5): 1994; 1995; 2002; 2003; 2024
- Second-half titles (4): 1995; 2003; 2008; 2023

Team data
- Name: Carolina Mudcats (1991–2025)
- Colors: Red, black, white, gray
- Mascot: Muddy the Mudcat, Mini Muddy
- Ballpark: Five County Stadium (1991–2025); Fleming Stadium (1991)
- Website: milb.com/carolina-mudcats

The Carolina Mudcats were a Minor League Baseball team that played in Zebulon, North Carolina, a suburb of Raleigh, from 1991 to 2025. They played their home games at Five County Stadium for all 35 seasons after playing part of their inaugural season at Fleming Stadium. "Mudcats" is a Southern synonym for catfish.

The team began play in 1991 after the Columbus Mudcats relocated from Columbus, Georgia. They were members of the Double-A Southern League through 2011. The Mudcats were replaced by a Class A-Advanced team of the Carolina League in 2012. This team carried on as an extension of the previous club. In conjunction with Major League Baseball's reorganization of Minor League Baseball in 2021, the Mudcats were dropped to the Low-A classification and placed in the Low-A East, which became the Single-A Carolina League in 2022. They played in Zebulon for 35 seasons until relocating to Wilson, North Carolina, as the Wilson Warbirds, after the 2025 campaign.

The Mudcats won the Southern League championship in 1995 as the Double-A affiliate of the Pittsburgh Pirates and in 2003 as the Double-A affiliate of the Florida Marlins.

== History ==
=== Before Carolina ===
The Mudcats came to Zebulon, North Carolina, by way of Columbus, Georgia. From 1969 to 1990, Columbus was home to the Double-A Southern League's Columbus Mudcats. Following the 1990 season, team owner Steve Bryant relocated the club to the Raleigh suburb of Zebulon, where it continued in the Southern League as the Carolina Mudcats. The team played at Five County Stadium, which was named for its location near the convergence of five counties: Wake, Nash, Johnston, Franklin, and Wilson. The stadium was as close to Raleigh as it could get without infringing on the territorial rights of the then Class A (now Triple-A) Durham Bulls.

=== Pittsburgh Pirates (1991–1998) ===
As the Double-A affiliate of the Pittsburgh Pirates, the Carolina Mudcats played their first game on April 11, 1991, on the road against the Greenville Braves at Greenville Municipal Stadium in Greenville, South Carolina, losing, 1–0. They earned their first win the next evening, defeating Greenville, 7–3. While work on Five County Stadium continued, the Mudcats opened their home schedule at Fleming Stadium in Wilson on April 19. They won their home opener over Greenville, 5–1, before 4,357 people. Initially delayed because of rain, the game was called in the eighth inning with Mudcats starting pitcher Tim Wakefield earning the win after allowing only one run on four hits over seven innings. Their first game at Five County Stadium was played on July 3. A standing-room-only crowd of 7,333 witnessed a 6–1 defeat by the Braves.

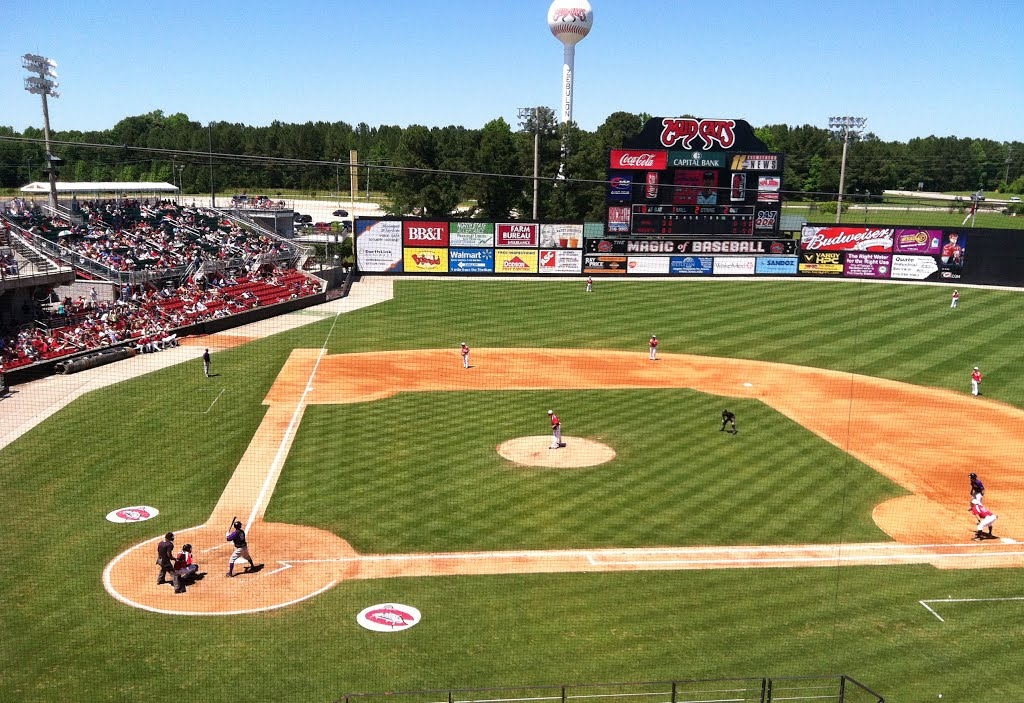
Five County Stadium, home of the Carolina Mudcats

The Southern League used a split-season schedule wherein the division winners from each half qualified for the postseason championship playoffs. Carolina did not win either half of their inaugural season. Overall, the Mudcats finished their first season with a 66–76 win–loss record. The team posted a franchise-low 52–92 record in 1992. After their first winning campaign in 1993, the 1994 Mudcats won the First Half Eastern Division title and then beat Greenville, 3–2, to claim the Eastern Division title and a place in the league championship series. They were defeated in the finals by the Western Division champion Huntsville Stars, 3–1. First baseman Mark Johnson, who led the circuit with 23 home runs. was selected as the Southern League Most Valuable Player (MVP).

Managed by Trent Jewett, Carolina won both halves of the 1995 season, sending them back to the playoffs with a franchise-best 89–55 campaign. They won the Eastern Division title versus the Orlando Cubs, 3–2, before winning their first Southern League championship over the Chattanooga Lookouts, 3–2. Catcher Jason Kendall was selected for the league MVP Award. The Mudcats qualified for the 1996 playoffs via a wild card berth but were eliminated in the Eastern Division series by the Jacksonville Suns, 3–2. The next two Carolina teams finished with sub-.500 records. The Mudcats' affiliation with the Pirates ended after the 1998 season. Over eight years with Pittsburgh, Carolina held a regular season record of 539–587.

=== Colorado Rockies (1999–2002) ===
Carolina became the Double-A affiliate of the Colorado Rockies in 1999. The team incurred losing records in each of the first three seasons of the partnership. In 2002, the Mudcats won the First Half Eastern Division title, but they lost the Eastern Division crown to Jacksonville, 3–2. The affiliation ended after four years with Carolina going 251–302 in the regular season over that stretch.

=== Florida Marlins (2003–2008) ===
The Mudcats joined the Florida Marlins organization in 2003 as their Double-A affiliate. In the first season of the partnership, manager Tracy Woodson led Carolina to win both halves of the season and the Eastern Division title versus the Tennessee Smokies, 3–1. The Mudcats then won their second Southern League championship over Huntsville, 3–2. The team returned to the playoffs with a wild card berth in 2005, but they were swept out of the division series, 3–0, by the West Tenn Diamond Jaxx.

Carolina won the Second Half Northern Division title in 2008 and defeated West Tenn in a three-game sweep to advance to the Southern League finals. In a full five-game series, the Mudcats lost the league championship to the Mississippi Braves, 3–2. Gaby Sánchez, a Carolina first and third baseman who led the league with 42 doubles, was selected as the Southern League MVP. The six-year affiliation with Florida came to an end after the 2008 campaign. Carolina's record over that time was 431–400.

=== Cincinnati Reds (2009–2011) ===
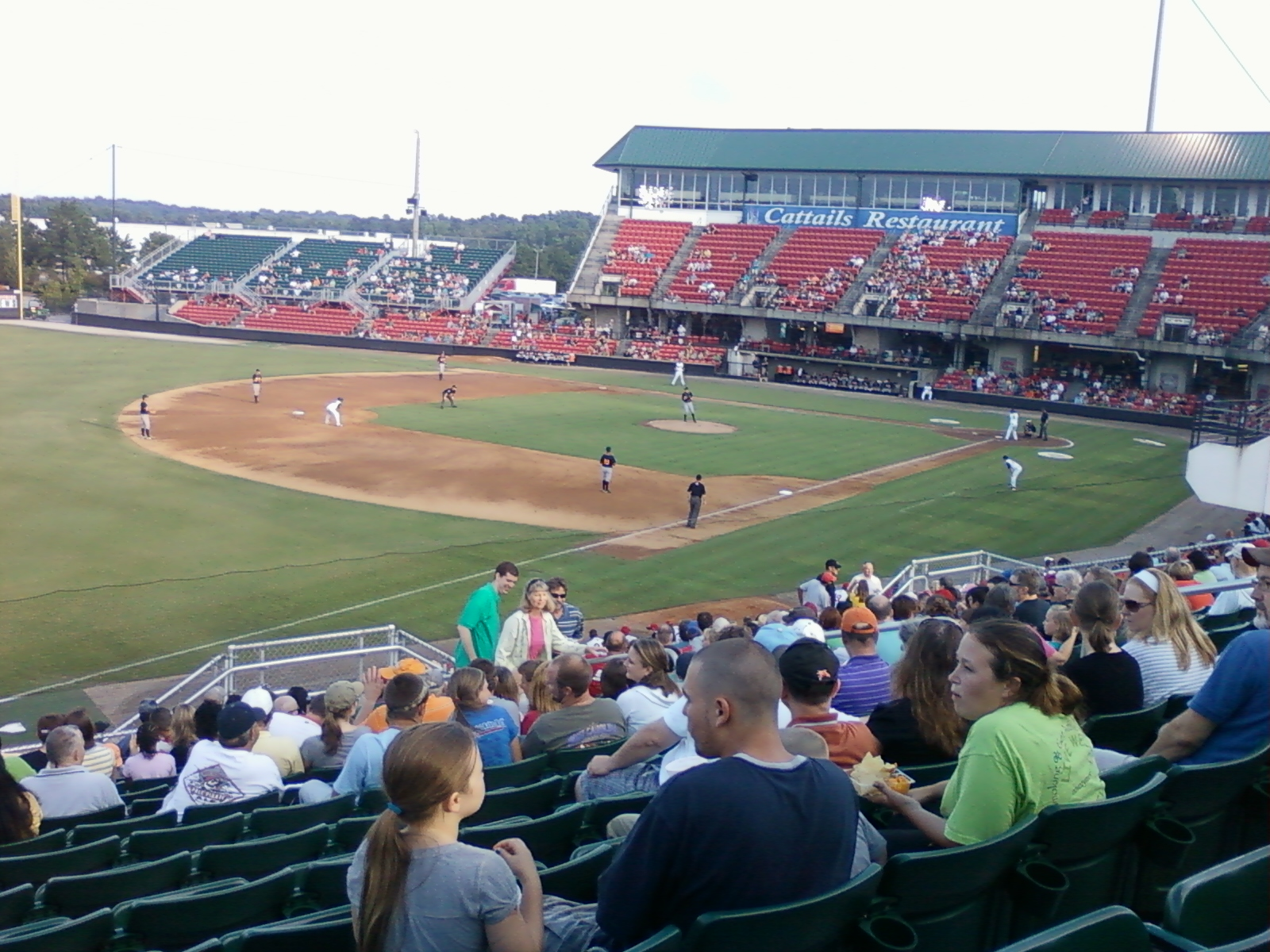
A Mudcats game at Five County Stadium

The Mudcats became the Double-A affiliate of the Cincinnati Reds in 2009. With losing records, the team missed out on playoff spots in each of their three seasons with the Reds. Two players, however, were selected for league year-end awards. Pitcher Travis Wood received the Southern League Most Outstanding Pitcher Award in 2009. Center fielder Dave Sappelt, who had a league-leading .361 batting average, won the MVP Award in 2010. Over three years with Cincinnati, the Mudcats went 176–239.

In December 2010, team owner Steve Bryant sold his Southern League franchise to businessman Quint Studer and his wife, Rishy, who planned to relocate the team to Pensacola, Florida, as the Pensacola Blue Wahoos in 2012. In a corresponding move, the Studers facilitated Bryant's purchase of the Kinston Indians of the Class A-Advanced Carolina League. As the Southern League franchise departed for Pensacola after the 2011 season, the Carolina League franchise moved to Zebulon and continued as the Mudcats at Class A-Advanced.

=== Cleveland Indians (2012–2014) ===
Upon joining the Carolina League in 2012, the Mudcats became the Class A-Advanced affiliate of the Cleveland Indians in a continuation of their previous relationship with Kinston. Their new league used the same split-season format as the Southern League. Carolina posted losing records in each season of the three-year run with Cleveland without qualifying for the playoffs. They went 182–234 over this period. In 2013, pitcher Cody Anderson, who led the league with a 2.34 earned run average, won the Carolina League Pitcher of the Year Award and the league's Community Service Award.

=== Atlanta Braves (2015–2016) ===
The Mudcats' next affiliate was the Atlanta Braves. The partnership began in 2015 with the team experiencing its first winning season (71–68) since 2008. They finished 35 games under .500 in 2016, the last year of the affiliation, giving them a cumulative two-year record of 123–155.

=== Milwaukee Brewers (2017–2025) ===
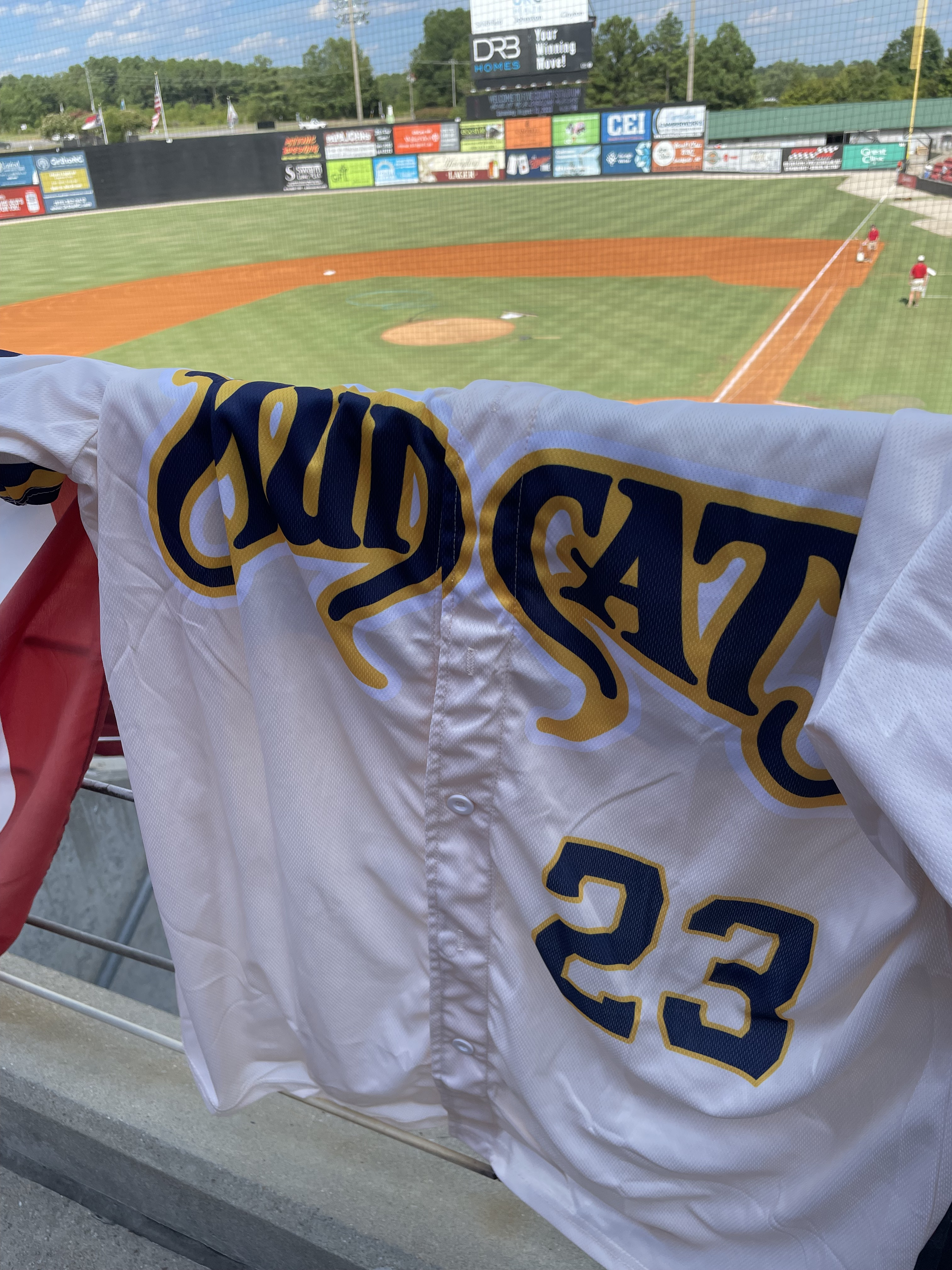
A Brewers-themed Mudcats jersey given away in August 2023

The Mudcats became the Class A-Advanced affiliate of the Milwaukee Brewers in 2017. The team narrowly missed the playoffs in their first year with the Brewers with a 73–65 record. In October 2017, team owner Steve Bryant sold his majority interest in the Mudcats to the Brewers. In 2019, catcher Mario Feliciano won the Carolina League Most Valuable Player Award; he led the league with 19 home runs, 78 RBI, and a .476 slugging percentage at the time of the award. Starter Noah Zavolas won the Pitcher of the Year Award; he held a league-best 1.14 WHIP at the time.

The start of the 2020 season was postponed due to the COVID-19 pandemic before being cancelled on June 30. Following the 2020 season, Major League Baseball assumed control of Minor League Baseball in a move to increase player salaries, modernize facility standards, and reduce travel. As a result, the Brewers' Class A affiliate, the Wisconsin Timber Rattlers, was moved up to High-A. Consequently, the Mudcats were shifted to the Low-A classification as members of the Low-A East but kept their affiliation with Milwaukee. Carolina began competition in the new league on May 4 with a 6–5 victory over the Fayetteville Woodpeckers at Five County Stadium. The Mudcats placed second in the Central Division at 68–52 after their first season in the Low-A East.

In 2022, the Low-A East became known as the Carolina League, the name historically used by the regional circuit prior to the 2021 reorganization, and was reclassified as a Single-A circuit. The Mudcats finished the first half in second place, one game behind the division winner. They placed second in the second-half but further back. Overall, Carolina had a 69–62 record. Outfielder Jackson Chourio was voted the Carolina League MVP and won the league's Top MLB Prospect Award.

The 2023 Mudcats ended the first-half five games out of first-place, but won the second-half by four games with a record of 39–25. Overall, they were 72–55 for the season. Carolina lost the Northern Division title versus the Down East Wood Ducks, 2–1. Victor Estevez was chosen for the Carolina League Manager of the Year Award. The Mudcats won the first half of the 2024 season with a 41–24 mark, clinching a spot in the playoffs, but they were defeated in the division series by the Fredericksburg Nationals, 2–0. Overall, they posted a league-best 78–51 record. Nick Stanley won the league's Manager of the Year Award.

The 2025 season was the Mudcats' 35th and final season of play. They relocated to Wilson, North Carolina, in 2026. They play at a new $75.5-million stadium near downtown, about 20 miles (32 km) east of Five County Stadium. The team has been rebranded as the Wilson Warbirds. Carolina's final home game was a 1–0 loss to the Delmarva Shorebirds played on August 31 with 5,877 people in attendance. Their final game was a 6–3 win over the Fredericksburg Nationals at Virginia Credit Union Stadium on September 7. Shortstop Jesús Made won the league's Top MLB Prospect Award. Through nine seasons of competition as a Brewers farm club, the Mudcats had a win–loss record of 558–492. Over all 35 years of competition, Carolina had a 2,260–2,409 record.

== Season-by-season records ==
Key
League	The team's final position in the league standings
Division	The team's final position in the divisional standings
GB	Games behind the team that finished in first place in the division that season
Apps.	Postseason appearances: number of seasons the team qualified for the postseason
†	League champions
*	Division champions
^	Postseason berth

Season-by-season records
Season	League	Regular-season					Postseason			MLB affiliate	Ref.
Season	League	Record	Win %	League	Division	GB	Record	Win %	Result	MLB affiliate	Ref.
1991	SL	66–76	.465	7th (tie)	5th	21	—	—	Result	—	Pittsburgh Pirates
1992	SL	52–92	.361	10th	5th	48 1/2	—	—	—	Pittsburgh Pirates	
1993	SL	74–67	.525	3rd	2nd	1/2	—	—	—	Pittsburgh Pirates	
1994^ *	SL	74–66	.529	4th (tie)	2nd	1	4–5	.444	Won First-Half Eastern Division title Won Eastern Division title vs. Greenville Braves, 3–2; Lost SL championship vs. Huntsville Stars, 3–1	Pittsburgh Pirates	
1995^ * †	SL	89–55	.618	1st	1st	—	6–4	.600	Won First and Second-Half Eastern Division titles Won Eastern Division title vs. Orlando Cubs, 3–2; Won SL championship vs. Chattanooga Lookouts, 3–2	Pittsburgh Pirates	
1996^	SL	70–69	.504	6th	2nd	5 1/2	2–3	.400	Lost Eastern Division title vs. Jacksonville Suns, 3–2	Pittsburgh Pirates	
1997	SL	55–82	.401	10th	5th	19 1/2	—	—	—	Pittsburgh Pirates	
1998	SL	59–80	.424	9th	5th	26 1/2	—	—	—	Pittsburgh Pirates	
1999	SL	60–80	.429	9th	4th	14 1/2	—	—	—	Colorado Rockies	
2000	SL	64–75	.460	9th (tie)	5th	6 1/2	—	—	—	Colorado Rockies	
2001	SL	62–76	.449	7th	3rd	20 1/2	—	—	—	Colorado Rockies	
2002^	SL	65–71	.478	8th	4th	10 1/2	2–3	.400	Won First-Half Eastern Division title Lost Eastern Division title vs. Jacksonville Suns, 3–2	Colorado Rockies	
2003^ * †	SL	80–58	.580	1st	1st	—	6–3	.667	Won First and Second-Half Eastern Division titles Won Eastern Division title vs. Tennessee Smokies, 3–1; Won SL championship vs. Huntsville Stars, 3–2	Florida Marlins	
2004	SL	73–66	.525	2nd (tie)	2nd	13 1/2	—	—	—	Florida Marlins	
2005^	SL	77–57	.575	3rd	2nd	3 1/2	0–3	.000	Lost Northern Division title vs. West Tenn Diamond Jaxx, 3–0	Florida Marlins	
2006	SL	61–79	.436	8th	5th	20	—	—	—	Florida Marlins	
2007	SL	60–80	.429	10th	5th	16 1/2	—	—	—	Florida Marlins	
2008^ *	SL	80–60	.571	1st	1st	—	5–3	.625	Won Second-Half Northern Division title Won Northern Division title vs. West Tenn Diamond Jaxx, 3–0; Lost SL championship vs. Mississippi Braves, 3–2	Florida Marlins	
2009	SL	65–74	.468	6th (tie)	2nd (tie)	5 1/2	—	—	—	Cincinnati Reds	
2010	SL	58–79	.423	9th	5th	27	—	—	—	Cincinnati Reds	
2011	SL	53–86	.381	10th	5th	29 1/2	—	—	—	Cincinnati Reds	
2012	CL	63–77	.450	7th	4th	25	—	—	—	Cleveland Indians	
2013	CL	57–83	.407	8th	4th	20 1/2	—	—	—	Cleveland Indians	
2014	CL	62–74	.456	7th	3rd	19	—	—	—	Cleveland Indians	
2015	CL	71–68	.511	4th	3rd	10 1/2	—	—	—	Atlanta Braves	
2016	CL	52–87	.374	8th	4th	35	—	—	—	Atlanta Braves	
2017	CL	73–65	.529	3rd	2nd	1/2	—	—	—	Milwaukee Brewers	
2018	CL	65–73	.471	7th	3rd	19	—	—	—	Milwaukee Brewers	
2019	CL	65–74	.468	7th	4th	22	—	—	—	Milwaukee Brewers	
2020	Season cancelled (COVID-19 pandemic)									Milwaukee Brewers	
2021	A-E	68–52	.567	4th (tie)	2nd	4	—	—	—	Milwaukee Brewers	
2022	CL	69–62	.527	4th (tie)	2nd	6 1/2	—	—	—	Milwaukee Brewers	
2023^	CL	72–55	.567	1st	2nd	—	1–2	.333	Won Second-Half Northern Division title Lost Northern Division title vs. Down East Wood Ducks, 2–1	Milwaukee Brewers	
2024^	CL	78–51	.605	1st	1st	—	0–2	.000	Won First-Half Northern Division title Lost Northern Division title vs. Fredericksburg Nationals, 2–0	Milwaukee Brewers	
2025	CL	68–60	.531	2nd (tie)	2nd	1 1/2	—	—	—	Milwaukee Brewers	
Totals	—	2,260–2,409	.484	—	—	—	26–28	.481	—	—	—

Franchise totals by affiliation
Affiliation	Regular season		Postseason			Composite	
Affiliation	Record	Win %	Apps.	Record	Win %	Record	Win %
Pittsburgh Pirates (1991–1998)	539–587	.479	3	12–12	.500	551–599	.479
Colorado Rockies (1999–2002)	251–302	.454	1	2–3	.400	253–305	.453
Florida Marlins (2003–2008)	431–400	.519	3	11–9	.550	442–409	.519
Cincinnati Reds (2009–2011)	176–239	.424	0	—	—	176–239	.424
Cleveland Indians (2012–2014)	182–234	.438	0	—	—	182–234	.438
Atlanta Braves (2015–2016)	123–155	.442	0	—	—	123–155	.442
Milwaukee Brewers (2017–2025)	558–492	.531	2	1–4	.200	559–496	.530
All-time	2,260–2,409	.484	9	26–28	.481	2,286–2,437	.484

== Awards ==
Ten players, two managers, and one executive won league awards in recognition for their performance with the Mudcats.

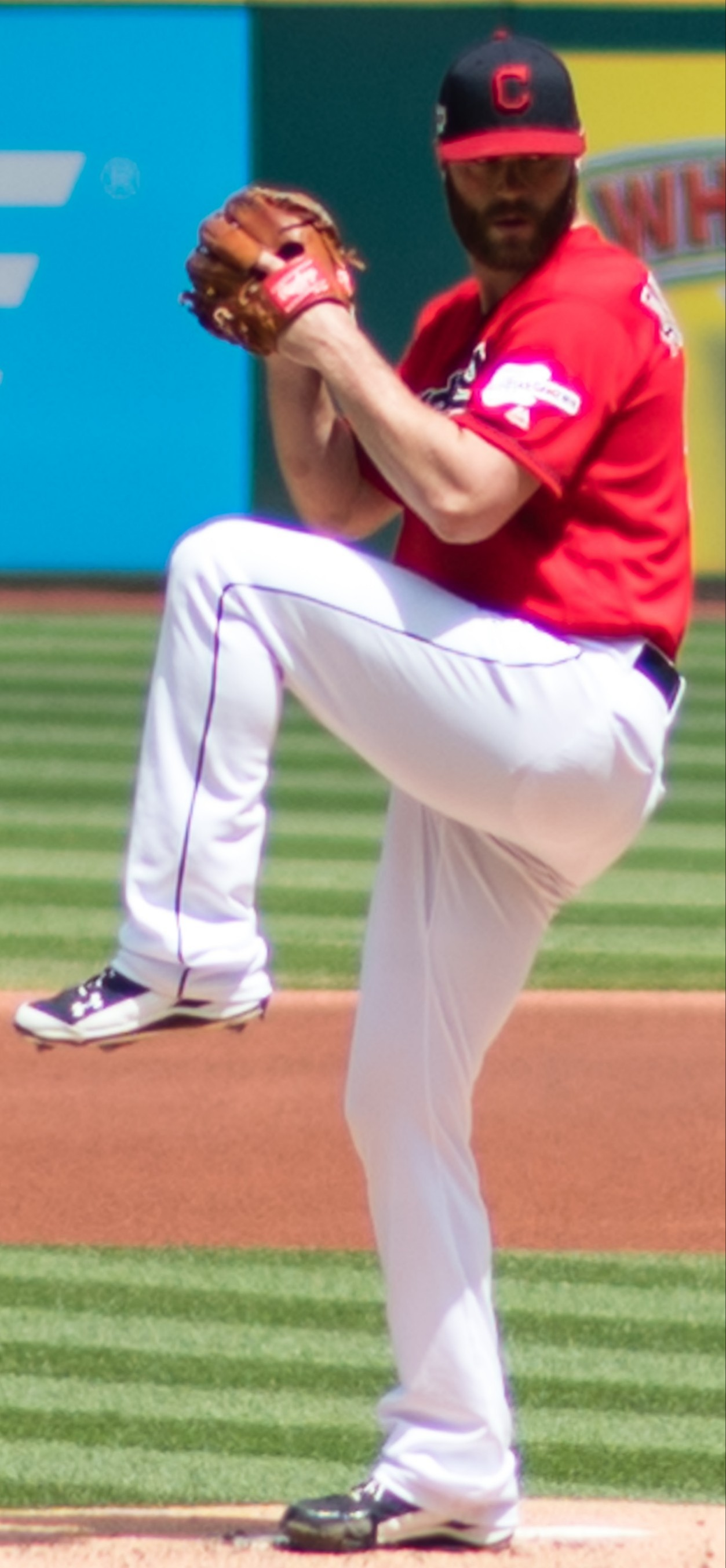
Cody Anderson won the Carolina League Pitcher of the Year Award and its Community Service Award in 2013.

Southern League awards
Award	Recipient	Season	Ref.
Most Valuable Player	Mark Johnson	1994	
Most Valuable Player	Jason Kendall	1995	
Most Valuable Player	Gaby Sánchez	2008	
Most Valuable Player	Dave Sappelt	2010	
Most Outstanding Pitcher	Travis Wood	2009	
Executive of the Year	Joe Kremer	1993	
Executive of the Year	Joe Kremer	1995	
Executive of the Year	Joe Kremer	2005	
Executive of the Year	Joe Kremer	2008	

Carolina League awards
Award	Recipient	Season	Ref.
Most Valuable Player	Mario Feliciano	2019	
Most Valuable Player	Jackson Chourio	2022	
Pitcher of the Year	Cody Anderson	2013	
Pitcher of the Year	Noah Zavolas	2019	
Top MLB Prospect	Jackson Chourio	2022	
Top MLB Prospect	Jesús Made	2025	
Community Service Award	Cody Anderson	2013	
Manager of the Year Award	Victor Estevez	2023	
Manager of the Year Award	Nick Stanley	2024	
Executive of the Year	Joe Kremer	2018	
