= Pensacola Blue Wahoos =

- Founded in 2012; Pensacola, Florida
Team logo
Cap insignia

Minor league affiliations
- Class: Double-A (2012–present)
- League: Southern League (2012–present)
- Division: South Division

Major league affiliations
- Team: Miami Marlins (2021–present)
- Previous teams: Minnesota Twins (2019–2020); Cincinnati Reds (2012–2018)

Minor league titles
- League titles (2): 2017; 2022
- Division titles (3): 2017; 2022; 2023
- First-half titles (4): 2016; 2017; 2022; 2023
- Second-half titles (3): 2015; 2016; 2026

Team data
- Name: Pensacola Blue Wahoos (2012–present)
- Colors: Gulf Coast royal blue, Blue Angel navy, coral pink, tin roof tin
- Mascot: Kazoo
- Ballpark: Admiral Fetterman Field (2012–present)
- Owner(s)/ Operator(s): Quint Studer, Rishy Studer, and Bubba Watson
- President: Jonathan Griffith
- Manager: Nelson Prada
- Website: milb.com/pensacola

The Pensacola Blue Wahoos are a Minor League Baseball team of the Southern League and the Double-A affiliate of the Miami Marlins. They are based in Pensacola, Florida, and play their home games at Admiral Fetterman Field. In 2012, the team relocated to Pensacola from Zebulon, North Carolina, where they were known as the Carolina Mudcats.

== History ==
The franchise began in 1959 as the Charleston White Sox of the South Atlantic League (now the Southern League); it subsequently moved several times, playing in Charleston, South Carolina, (1959–1961); Savannah, Georgia, (1962); Lynchburg, Virginia, (1963–1965); and Evansville, Indiana, (1966–1968), before moving to Columbus, Georgia, in 1969 to play in Golden Park. The team was known as the Columbus Astros from 1970 to 1988, when it became an affiliate of the Houston Astros. Following the 1988 season, new owner Steve Bryant held a contest among season ticket holders to rename the team, and as a result, in 1989 the team became the Columbus Mudcats. In 1991, Bryant moved the club to Zebulon, North Carolina, and renamed them the Carolina Mudcats.

In Zebulon, the team played in Five County Stadium and won Southern League championships in 1995 and 2003. In 2010, Quint Studer, owner of the Pensacola Pelicans independent baseball team, acquired the Mudcats franchise in a complicated series of moves and purchases designed to bring affiliated Double-A baseball to Pensacola. First, he sold the Pelicans to a group in Amarillo, Texas, where they became the Amarillo Sox in 2011. Studer then bought the Carolina Mudcats franchise. To settle this purchase, he had to facilitate the move of the Kinston Indians to Zebulon, where they assumed the Carolina Mudcats name and branding. Additionally, as Pensacola is within the franchise territory of the Mobile Bay Bears, Studer paid that team an undisclosed sum of money. The arrangements cost a total of $2 million.

The Blue Wahoos nickname was decided in a fan contest run by Wendy's in conjunction with the Pensacola News Journal. It refers to the wahoo (Acanthocybium solandri), a local fish species. Their team colors are Neon red, Gulf Coast royal, Blue Angel navy, and Tin Roof tin. It was officially announced on May 23, followed by the logo and colors on November 18.

Following the inaugural season that saw Billy Hamilton break the all-time professional baseball single season stolen base record, the team was named the Southern League's Organization of the Year. Two-time Masters Champion Bubba Watson became co-owner in January 2015.

In 2016, the Blue Wahoos were chosen by Baseball America as the Double-A winner of the prestigious Bob Freitas Award as the best overall franchise among the nation's 30 affiliates at this level. It was announced at the Baseball Winter Meetings at the Gaylord Resort and Convention Center in National Harbor, Maryland, just outside of Washington, D.C.

They entered into a two-year PDC with the Minnesota Twins that ran from 2019 to 2020. The start of the 2020 season was postponed due to the COVID-19 pandemic before ultimately being cancelled on June 30.

Starting in 2021, the Blue Wahoos were affiliated with the Miami Marlins. In a further result of Major League Baseball's restructuring of Minor League Baseball in 2021, the Blue Wahoos were organized into the eight-team Double-A South. In 2022, the Double-A South became known as the Southern League, the name historically used by the regional circuit prior to the 2021 reorganization.

== Television and radio ==
All Pensacola Blue Wahoos games are televised live on MiLB.TV. The Blue Wahoos are also televised on delay Monday through Thursday on Cox Sports and Friday through Sunday on Blab-TV (WFBD). All Blue Wahoos games are broadcast on radio on WTKE/1490 and TuneIn Radio.

== Season-by-season records ==
Pensacola Blue Wahoos
Year	Regular Season			Postseason		
Year	Record	Win %	Finish*	Record	Win %	Result
2012	68–70	.493	7th	–	–	–
2013	59–79	.428	T-8th	–	–	–
2014	60–80	.429	T-7th	–	–	–
2015 ¤	63–75	.429	8th	0–3	.000	Won South Division Second Half; Lost South Division Championship Series vs Biloxi Shuckers, 3–0
2016 ¤	81–59	.579	2nd	1–3	.250	Won South Division First & Second Half; Lost South Division Championship Series vs Mississippi Braves, 3–1
2017 †	74–66	.529	3rd	3–0	1.000	Won South Division First Half; Won South Division Championship Series vs Jacksonville Jumbo Shrimp, 3–0; Southern League Championship cancelled Southern League Co-Champions
2018 ¤	69–68	.504	4th	1–3	.250	Lost South Division Championship Series vs Biloxi Shuckers, 3–1
2019 ¤	76-63	.547	4th	2–3	.400	Lost South Division Championship Series vs Biloxi Shuckers, 3–2
2020	Season cancelled (COVID-19 pandemic)					
2021	57–54	.514	5th	–	–	–
2022 †	68–63	.519	3rd	4–2	.667	Won South Division First Half; Won South Division Championship Series vs Montgomery Biscuits, 2–1; Won Southern League Championship vs Tennessee Smokies, 2–1; Southern League Champions
2023 ^	79–57	.581	1st	2–2	.500	Won South Division First Half; Won South Division Championship Series vs Montgomery Biscuits, 2–0; Lost Southern League Championship vs Tennessee Smokies, 2–0
2024	71–65	.522	T-3rd	–	–	–
Totals	825–799	.508	–	16–16	.500	2 Southern League Championships
Note: * Finish denotes their position in the overall league standings.
Legend		¤ Made playoffs		^ Division champions		† Won championship series

== Roster ==
Pensacola Blue Wahoos roster
Players	Coaches/Other
Pitchers: 23 Nigel Belgrave; 21 Gabe Bierman; 31 Eliazar Dishmey; 24 Josh Hejka; 39 Jacob Kisting; 34 Colby Martin; 9 Jacob Miller; 37 Luis Moreno; 26 Orlando Ortiz-Mayr; 25 Juan Reynoso; 18 Jack Sellinger; 36 Tristan Stevens; 34 Justin Storm; 20 Mason Vinyard; 16 Joey Volini; 36 Logan Whitaker; 33 Alex Williams; Catchers: 27 Spencer Bramwell; 7 Ryan Ignoffo; Infielders: 5 Aiva Arquette; 28 Jay Beshears; 39 Payton Green; 4 Cristian Hernández; 14 Dylan Jasso; 6 Ian Lewis Jr. ~; 8 Adrian Santana; Outfielders: 24 Emaarion Boyd; 1 Dillon Lewis; 3 Ethan O'Donnell; 11 Colby Shade; Designated hitters: 10 Max Williams	Manager: 22 Nelson Prada; Coaches: 17 Toby Nagel (pitching); 29 Brian Sharpe (hitting); 2 Mason Sherill (assistant); 15 Cam Vega (defensive); 60-day injured list: 19 Kade Bragg; -- Xavier Meachem (full season); 32 Will Schomberg (full season); 13 Fenwick Trimble; 40 Samuel Vásquez; 7-day injured list; * On Miami Marlins 40-man roster; ~ Development list; # Rehab assignment; ∞ Reserve list; ‡ Restricted list; § Suspended list; † Temporarily inactive list; Roster updated September 3, 2026; Transactions; → More rosters: MiLB • Southern League; → Miami Marlins minor league players

Preceded by Carolina Mudcats	Cincinnati Reds; Double-A affiliate 2012–2018	Succeeded by Chattanooga Lookouts
