= Southern League (1964–present) =

Minor League Baseball league in the Southern United States

- Upcoming season or competition: 2026 Southern League season
- Classification: Double-A
- Sport: Baseball
- Founded: 1964 (62 years ago)
- No. of teams: 8
- Country: United States
- Most recent champion: Rocket City Trash Pandas (2026)
- Most titles: Birmingham Barons (9)
- Website: milb.com

The Southern League is a Minor League Baseball league that has operated in the Southern United States since 1964. With the Eastern League and the Texas League, it is one of three circuits playing at the Double-A level, which is two grades below Major League Baseball (MLB).

The league traces its roots to the original Southern League (1885–1899), the Southern Association (1901–1961), and the original South Atlantic League (1904–1963). The later circuit dissolved before the 1964 season and refounded itself as the Southern League. Following MLB's reorganization of the minor leagues in 2021, it operated as the Double-A South for one season before switching back to its previous moniker in 2022. In its inaugural 1964 season, the Southern League consisted of eight teams from Alabama, Georgia, North Carolina, Tennessee, and Virginia. Following contractions, expansions, and relocations, the league consists of eight teams in Alabama, Florida, Georgia, Mississippi, and Tennessee.

A league champion is determined at the end of each season. The Birmingham Barons have won nine Southern League titles, the most in the league, followed by the Jacksonville Suns (six) and Montgomery Rebels (five).

== History ==
=== Predecessor leagues (1885–1963) ===
The original Southern League was formed prior to the 1885 season as an eight-team circuit playing in the Southern United States. It operated at various times as a Class B league (equivalent to short-season Class A before 2021, and Low-A since 2021). Fraught with financial problems, teams regularly dropped out before the season's end. After being nonoperational in 1891, 1892, and 1897, it disbanded permanently after halting play during the 1899 season.

The Southern Association was formed in 1901 as a Class B circuit operating in nearly the same footprint as the first Southern League. It was elevated to Class A in 1902, Class A1 in 1936, and Double-A in 1946. The Southern Association remained a premier Southern baseball league until Major League Baseball radio and television broadcasts began to undercut attendance in the 1950s. The league disbanded after 1961.

The original South Atlantic League, nicknamed the "SALLY League" and not related to the current South Atlantic League (formerly the Western Carolinas League), was formed in 1904. The direct ancestor of the current circuit, it operated at Class C (equivalent to an Advanced Rookie league before 2021 and a Rookie league since 2021) until it was elevated to Class B in 1921 and Class A in 1946. A year after the Southern Association's disbandment, the SALLY League took its place at the Double-A level in 1963.

=== The modern league (1964–present) ===
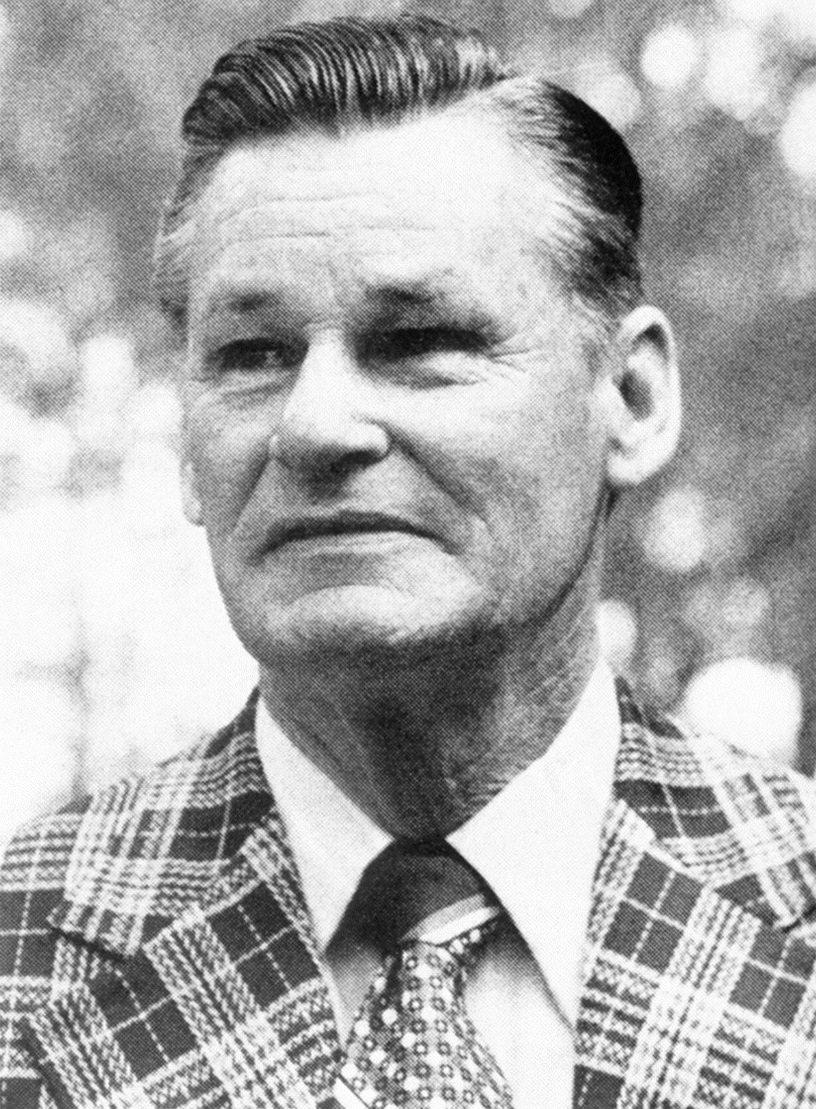
Billy Hitchcock instituted several changes to modernize the league during his 1971 to 1980 presidency.

The Double-A SALLY League dissolved after the 1963 season and refounded itself as the Southern League. The newly minted league wanted to distance itself from the SALLY League's past history in the low minors. Additionally, many leagues had contributed to its legacy. For these reasons, it elected to start with a clean slate and does not claim the original SALLY League's history or records as its own. In its inaugural campaign, the six-team Southern League consisted of the Asheville Tourists, Birmingham Barons, Charlotte Hornets, Chattanooga Lookouts, Columbus Confederate Yankees, Knoxville Smokies, Lynchburg White Sox, and Macon Peaches. Sam C. Smith, the last president of the SALLY League, served as president of the new Southern League.

From 1967 to 1969, the league was reduced to six teams. It went back to eight clubs in 1970, but dropped to seven in 1971. With an odd number of teams, the Southern League joined forces with the Double-A Texas League as the Dixie Association in 1971. The two leagues played an interlocking schedule with individual league champions determined at the end of the season. Up to this point, the Southern League pennant had simply gone to the team with the best record at the end of the regular season. For the first time, the top two Southern League teams met in a best-of-three series to determine champions. The Charlotte Hornets defeated the Asheville Tourists, 2–1, and then defeated the Texas League champion Arkansas Travelers, 3–0, to win the Dixie Association championship. The partnership was dissolved after the season.

President Smith died suddenly in April 1971, and Billy Hitchcock became the new president that August. Hitchcock introduced a number of changes that are still in use today. In 1972, the Southern League was split into two divisions, Eastern and Western. The playoffs, which began in the Dixie Association, were continued and expanded to a best-of-five series. The league also began selecting postseason All-Star teams and issuing awards for the Most Valuable Player, Most Outstanding Pitcher, and Manager of the Year. In 1976, it introduced a split-season format with the schedule divided in half and first and second half champions from each division being crowned. This expanded the playoffs to two rounds with the winners of each half competing for each division's championship and those winners meeting for the league championship. With the addition of two teams in 1978, the Southern League grew to 10 teams. Other improvements under Hitchcock's presidency included stadium refurbishments and efforts to make the league more family-friendly. Attendance figures rose dramatically during his tenure.

Jim Bragan became president in 1981 after Hitchcock's retirement. Over his 14 years leading the Southern League, attendance continued to grow as several cities built new ballparks. In 1994, Arnie Fielkow succeeded Bragan as president, and Don Mincher took over in 2000. Lori Webb became president in 2012 after Mincher's death that March.

=== COVID-19 impact and takeover by Major League Baseball (2020–present) ===
The start of the 2020 season was postponed due to the COVID-19 pandemic before ultimately being cancelled on June 30. As part of Major League Baseball's 2021 reorganization of the minor leagues, the Southern League was reduced to eight teams and temporarily renamed the "Double-A South" for the 2021 season. Following MLB's acquisition of the rights to the historical names of the minor leagues, the Double-A South was renamed the Southern League effective with the 2022 season.

== Current teams ==
Division	Team	MLB affiliation	City	Stadium	Capacity
North	Birmingham Barons	Chicago White Sox	Birmingham, Alabama	Regions Field	8,500
North	Chattanooga Lookouts	Cincinnati Reds	Chattanooga, Tennessee	Erlanger Park	8,032
North	Knoxville Smokies	Chicago Cubs	Knoxville, Tennessee	Covenant Health Park	6,355
North	Rocket City Trash Pandas	Los Angeles Angels	Madison, Alabama	Toyota Field	7,000
South	Biloxi Shuckers	Milwaukee Brewers	Biloxi, Mississippi	Keesler Federal Park	6,076
South	Columbus Clingstones	Atlanta Braves	Columbus, Georgia	Pinnacle Park	5,500
South	Montgomery Biscuits	Tampa Bay Rays	Montgomery, Alabama	Dabos Park	7,000
South	Pensacola Blue Wahoos	Miami Marlins	Pensacola, Florida	Community Maritime Park	5,038

North Division, South Division

== Structure and season ==
The Southern League is currently divided into two divisions, North and South, of four teams each. Previously, from 1972 to 2004, the league was split into Eastern and Western divisions. There were no divisions in place from 1964 to 1970. As of 2020, each club had 140 games scheduled per season. Utilizing a split-season schedule, each half consisted of 70 games. The season typically began during the first or second week of April and concluded in the first week of September on Labor Day.

=== Players ===
The Southern League uses a salary cap. As of the 2024 season, clubs are required to spend a maximum of US$1,360,000 on player compensation, with a minimum salary of $30,250 per player. For players aged 23 and younger on standard contracts, only 50% of their salary counts towards the cap (up to $200,000 total). There is also a separate salary cap for coaches and technical staff. Rosters are limited to a size of 28 players on Opening Day weekend, although up to 9 players can be signed on the roster before the transactions date limit.

=== All-Star Game ===
The Southern League All-Star Game was an annual midsummer game between two teams of the league's players, one made up of All-Stars from North Division teams and the other from South Division teams. First held in 1964, the event predominantly consisted of a single team of the league's All-Stars versus a Major League Baseball team through 1998. The division versus division format was used continuously from 1999 to 2019. No game was held from 1991 to 1995 as the Southern League and the other two Double-A leagues, the Eastern League and Texas League, participated in the Double-A All-Star Game instead.

== Teams timeline ==
League members Dixie Association Other active league Other Defunct League

== All-time teams ==
A "^" indicates that team's article redirects to an article of an active team formerly of the Southern League

- Asheville Orioles
- Asheville Tourists^
- Biloxi Shuckers
- Birmingham A's
- Birmingham Barons
- Carolina Mudcats^
- Charlotte Hornets
- Charlotte Knights^
- Charlotte O's
- Chattanooga Lookouts
- Columbus Astros
- Columbus Clingstones
- Columbus Confederate Yankees
- Columbus Mudcats
- Columbus White Sox
- Evansville White Sox
- Greenville Braves
- Huntsville Stars
- Jackson Generals
- Jacksonville Expos
- Jacksonville Jumbo Shrimp^
- Jacksonville Suns
- Knoxville Blue Jays
- Knoxville Smokies
- Knoxville Sox
- Lynchburg White Sox
- Macon Peaches
- Memphis Chicks
- Mississippi Braves
- Mobile A's
- Mobile BayBears
- Mobile White Sox
- Montgomery Biscuits
- Montgomery Rebels
- Nashville Sounds^
- Nashville Xpress
- Orlando Cubs
- Orlando Rays
- Orlando Sun Rays
- Orlando Twins
- Pensacola Blue Wahoos
- Port City Roosters
- Rocket City Trash Pandas
- Savannah Braves
- Savannah Indians
- Savannah Senators
- Tennessee Smokies
- West Tenn Diamond Jaxx

== Champions ==
League champions have been determined by different means since the Southern League's formation in 1964. Through 1970, champions were the regular-season pennant winners—the team with the best win–loss record at the conclusion of the regular season. The 1971 title was decided in a postseason series between the two teams with the best records. From 1972 to 1975, the winners of each of two divisions competed in a series to determine champions. The league operated using a split season format from 1976 to 2020. Under this format, the winners of each half within each division played for the division championship, and the division winners met to play for the SL title. The 2021 winner was crowned via a series between the two teams with the best full-season records. The 2022 championship will be decided through the same split-season divisional format used for most of the league's existence.

The Birmingham Barons have won 9 Southern League championships, the most among all teams in the league, followed by the Jacksonville Suns (6) and the Montgomery Rebels (5).

== Awards ==
The SL recognizes outstanding players and team personnel annually near the end of each season.

=== MVP Award ===
The Most Valuable Player Award is given to honor the best player in the league.

=== Pitcher of the Year Award ===
The Pitcher of the Year Award, originally known as the Most Outstanding Pitcher Award, serves to recognize the league's best pitcher.

=== Manager of the Year Award ===
The Manager of the Year Award is given to the league's top manager.

=== Top MLB Prospect Award ===
The Top MLB Prospect Award, created in 2021, is given to the league's top rookie prospect.

Top MLB Prospect
Season	Winner	Team	Organization	Position	Ref(s).
2021	Shea Langeliers	Mississippi Braves	Atlanta Braves	Catcher	
2022	Taj Bradley	Montgomery Biscuits	Tampa Bay Rays	Pitcher	
2023	Junior Caminero	Montgomery Biscuits	Tampa Bay Rays	Third baseman	
2024	Carson Williams	Montgomery Biscuits	Tampa Bay Rays	Shortstop	
2025	Sal Stewart	Chattanooga Lookouts	Cincinnati Reds	Third baseman	
2026	Jesús Made	Biloxi Shuckers	Milwaukee Brewers	Shortstop	

== Presidents ==
Six presidents led the Southern League since its formation:

- 1964–1971: Sam C. Smith
- 1971–1980: Billy Hitchcock
- 1981–1994: Jim Bragan
- 1994–2000: Arnie Fielkow
- 2000–2011: Don Mincher
- 2012–2020: Lori Webb

== See also ==
- Southern League Hall of Fame
- List of Southern League no-hitters
- List of Southern League stadiums
- Sports league attendances
