= 2017 Southern League season =

- League: Southern League
- Sport: Baseball
- Duration: April 6 – September 4
- Number of games: 140
- Number of teams: 10

Regular season
- League champions: Chattanooga Lookouts
- Season MVP: Kevin Cron, Jackson Generals

Playoffs
- League champions: Chattanooga Lookouts; Pensacola Blue Wahoos

SL seasons
- ← 2016 2018 →

The 2017 Southern League was a Class AA baseball season played between April 6 and September 4. Ten teams played a 140-game schedule, with the top team in each division in each half of the season qualifying for the post-season.

The Chattanooga Lookouts and Pensacola Blue Wahoos were co-champions of the Southern League, as Hurricane Irma canceled the final round of the playoffs.

== Team changes ==
- The Mobile BayBears ended their affiliation with the Arizona Diamondbacks and began a new affiliation with the Los Angeles Angels.
- The Jackson Generals ended their affiliation with the Seattle Mariners and began a new affiliation with the Arizona Diamondbacks.
- The Jacksonville Suns are renamed to the Jacksonville Jumbo Shrimp. The club remained affiliated with the Miami Marlins.

== Teams ==
2017 Southern League
Division	Team	City	MLB Affiliate	Stadium
North	Birmingham Barons	Birmingham, Alabama	Chicago White Sox	Regions Field
North	Chattanooga Lookouts	Chattanooga, Tennessee	Minnesota Twins	AT&T Field
North	Jackson Generals	Jackson, Tennessee	Arizona Diamondbacks	The Ballpark at Jackson
North	Montgomery Biscuits	Montgomery, Alabama	Tampa Bay Rays	Montgomery Riverwalk Stadium
North	Tennessee Smokies	Sevierville, Tennessee	Chicago Cubs	Smokies Park
South	Biloxi Shuckers	Biloxi, Mississippi	Milwaukee Brewers	MGM Park
South	Jacksonville Jumbo Shrimp	Jacksonville, Florida	Miami Marlins	Baseball Grounds of Jacksonville
South	Mississippi Braves	Jackson, Mississippi	Atlanta Braves	Trustmark Park
South	Mobile BayBears	Mobile, Alabama	Los Angeles Angels	Hank Aaron Stadium
South	Pensacola Blue Wahoos	Pensacola, Florida	Cincinnati Reds	Blue Wahoos Stadium

== Map of teams ==
North Division South Division

== Regular season ==
=== Summary ===
- The Chattanooga Lookouts finished the season with the best record in the league for the first time since 2004.

=== Standings ===
North Division
Team	Win	Loss	%	GB
Chattanooga Lookouts	91	49	.650	–
Montgomery Biscuits	76	64	.543	15
Jackson Generals	71	69	.507	20
Tennessee Smokies	68	70	.493	22
Birmingham Barons	53	85	.384	37
South Division
Pensacola Blue Wahoos	74	66	.529	–
Biloxi Shuckers	71	66	.518	1.5
Jacksonville Jumbo Shrimp	69	71	.493	5
Mobile BayBears	64	75	.460	9.5
Mississippi Braves	58	80	.420	15

== League Leaders ==
=== Batting leaders ===
Stat	Player	Total
AVG	Braxton Lee, Montgomery / Jacksonville	.309
H	Braxton Lee, Montgomery / Jacksonville	147
R	Jonathan Rodríguez, Chattanooga Lookouts	87
2B	Grant Kay, Montgomery Biscuits	36
3B	Nick Gordon, Chattanooga Lookouts; Joe McCarthy, Montgomery Biscuits	8
HR	Kevin Cron, Jackson Generals	25
RBI	Kevin Cron, Jackson Generals	91
SB	Johnny Davis, Biloxi Shuckers	52

=== Pitching leaders ===
Stat	Player	Total
W	José Mujica, Montgomery Biscuits; Matt Tomshaw, Jacksonville Jumbo Shrimp; Duane Underwood Jr., Tennessee Smokies	13
ERA	Austin Ross, Pensacola Blue Wahoos	1.87
CG	Spencer Adams, Birmingham Barons; Kolby Allard, Mississippi Braves; Jordan Guerrero, Birmingham Barons; Zach Hedges, Tennessee Smokies; Mike Kickham, Jacksonville Jumbo Shrimp; Aaron Wilkerson, Biloxi Shuckers	2
SHO	Aaron Wilkerson, Biloxi Shuckers	2
SV	Matt Ramsey, Biloxi Shuckers	27
IP	Deck McGuire, Pensacola Blue Wahoos	168.0
SO	Deck McGuire, Pensacola Blue Wahoos	170

== Playoffs ==
- Due to Hurricane Irma, the final round of the playoffs was canceled. The Chattanooga Lookouts and Pensacola Blue Wahoos were declared co-champions.
- The Chattanooga Lookouts won their third Southern League championship.
- The Pensacola Blue Wahoos won their first Southern League championship.

=== Playoff bracket ===
Division finals
N1	Chattanooga	3
N2	Montgomery	2
S1	Pensacola	3
S2	Jacksonville	0

Finals
N1	Chattanooga
S1	Pensacola

== Awards ==
Southern League awards
Award name	Recipient
Most Valuable Player	Kevin Cron, Jackson Generals
Pitcher of the Year	Michael Kopech, Birmingham Barons
Manager of the Year	Jake Mauer, Chattanooga Lookouts

== See also ==
- 2017 Major League Baseball season
