= 2013 Southern League season =

- League: Southern League
- Sport: Baseball
- Duration: April 4 – September 2
- Number of games: 140
- Number of teams: 10

Regular season
- League champions: Mobile BayBears
- Season MVP: Marcus Semien, Birmingham Barons

Playoffs
- League champions: Birmingham Barons
- Runners-up: Mobile BayBears

SL seasons
- ← 2012 2014 →

The 2013 Southern League was a Class AA baseball season played between April 4 and September 2. Ten teams played a 140-game schedule, with the top team in each division in each half of the season qualifying for the post-season.

The Birmingham Barons won the Southern League championship, defeating the Mobile BayBears in the playoffs.

== Teams ==
2013 Southern League
Division	Team	City	MLB Affiliate	Stadium
North	Birmingham Barons	Birmingham, Alabama	Chicago White Sox	Regions Field
North	Chattanooga Lookouts	Chattanooga, Tennessee	Los Angeles Dodgers	AT&T Field
North	Huntsville Stars	Huntsville, Alabama	Milwaukee Brewers	Joe W. Davis Stadium
North	Jackson Generals	Jackson, Tennessee	Seattle Mariners	The Ballpark at Jackson
North	Tennessee Smokies	Sevierville, Tennessee	Chicago Cubs	Smokies Park
South	Jacksonville Suns	Jacksonville, Florida	Miami Marlins	Baseball Grounds of Jacksonville
South	Mississippi Braves	Jackson, Mississippi	Atlanta Braves	Trustmark Park
South	Mobile BayBears	Mobile, Alabama	Arizona Diamondbacks	Hank Aaron Stadium
South	Montgomery Biscuits	Montgomery, Alabama	Tampa Bay Rays	Montgomery Riverwalk Stadium
South	Pensacola Blue Wahoos	Pensacola, Florida	Cincinnati Reds	Blue Wahoos Stadium

== Map of teams ==
North Division South Division

== Regular season ==
=== Summary ===
- The Mobile BayBears finished the season with the best record in the league for the first time since 2011.

=== Standings ===
North Division
Team	Win	Loss	%	GB
Tennessee Smokies	76	62	.551	–
Birmingham Barons	77	63	.550	–
Jackson Generals	62	73	.459	12.5
Huntsville Stars	59	79	.428	17
Chattanooga Lookouts	59	80	.424	17.5
South Division
Mobile BayBears	79	60	.568	–
Mississippi Braves	76	63	.547	3
Jacksonville Suns	73	63	.537	4.5
Montgomery Biscuits	71	69	.507	8.5
Pensacola Blue Wahoos	59	79	.428	19.5

== League Leaders ==
=== Batting leaders ===
Stat	Player	Total
AVG	Tommy La Stella, Mississippi Braves	.343
H	Matt Szczur, Tennessee Smokies	144
R	Marcus Semien, Birmingham Barons	90
2B	Christian Villanueva, Tennessee Smokies	41
3B	James Jones, Jackson Generals	10
HR	Brock Kjeldgaard, Huntsville Stars	24
RBI	Jason Rogers, Huntsville Stars	87
SB	Ender Inciarte, Mobile BayBears	43

=== Pitching leaders ===
Stat	Player	Total
W	Archie Bradley, Mobile BayBears	12
ERA	Kyle Hendricks, Tennessee Smokies	1.85
CG	Adam Conley, Jacksonville Suns; Erik Johnson, Birmingham Barons	3
SHO	Victor Mateo, Montgomery Biscuits	2
SV	Michael Brady, Jacksonville Suns	23
IP	Eric Jokisch, Tennessee Smokies	160.2
SO	Josh Smith, Pensacola Blue Wahoos	139

== Playoffs ==
- The Birmingham Barons won their seventh Southern League championship, defeating the Mobile BayBears in five games.

=== Playoff bracket ===
Division finals
N1	Tennessee	2
N2	Birmingham	3
S1	Mobile	3
S2	Mississippi	1

Finals
N2	Birmingham	3
S1	Mobile	2

== Awards ==
Southern League awards
Award name	Recipient
Most Valuable Player	Marcus Semien, Birmingham Barons
Pitcher of the Year	Archie Bradley, Mobile BayBears
Manager of the Year	Andy Green, Mobile BayBears

== See also ==
- 2013 Major League Baseball season
