= 2018 Southern League season =

- League: Southern League
- Sport: Baseball
- Duration: April 5 – September 3
- Games: 140
- Teams: 10

Regular season
- League champions: Biloxi Shuckers
- Season MVP: Corey Ray, Biloxi Shuckers

Playoffs
- League champions: Jackson Generals
- Runners-up: Biloxi Shuckers

SL seasons
- ← 2017 2019 →

The 2018 Southern League was a Class AA baseball season played between April 5 and September 3. Ten teams played a 140-game schedule, with the top team in each division in each half of the season qualifying for the post-season.

The Jackson Generals won the Southern League championship, defeating the Biloxi Shuckers in the playoffs.

== Teams ==
2018 Southern League
Division	Team	City	MLB Affiliate	Stadium
North	Birmingham Barons	Birmingham, Alabama	Chicago White Sox	Regions Field
North	Chattanooga Lookouts	Chattanooga, Tennessee	Minnesota Twins	AT&T Field
North	Jackson Generals	Jackson, Tennessee	Arizona Diamondbacks	The Ballpark at Jackson
North	Montgomery Biscuits	Montgomery, Alabama	Tampa Bay Rays	Montgomery Riverwalk Stadium
North	Tennessee Smokies	Sevierville, Tennessee	Chicago Cubs	Smokies Stadium
South	Biloxi Shuckers	Biloxi, Mississippi	Milwaukee Brewers	MGM Park
South	Jacksonville Jumbo Shrimp	Jacksonville, Florida	Miami Marlins	Baseball Grounds of Jacksonville
South	Mississippi Braves	Jackson, Mississippi	Atlanta Braves	Trustmark Park
South	Mobile BayBears	Mobile, Alabama	Los Angeles Angels	Hank Aaron Stadium
South	Pensacola Blue Wahoos	Pensacola, Florida	Cincinnati Reds	Blue Wahoos Stadium

== Map of teams ==
North Division South Division

== Regular season ==
=== Summary ===
- The Biloxi Shuckers finished the season with the best record in the league for the first time since 2015.

=== Standings ===
North Division
Team	Win	Loss	%	GB
Montgomery Biscuits	79	61	.564	–
Jackson Generals	75	64	.540	3.5
Tennessee Smokies	67	71	.486	11
Birmingham Barons	66	72	.478	12
Chattanooga Lookouts	65	72	.474	12.5
South Division
Biloxi Shuckers	81	59	.579	–
Pensacola Blue Wahoos	69	68	.504	10.5
Mississippi Braves	67	71	.486	13
Mobile BayBears	66	70	.485	13
Jacksonville Jumbo Shrimp	55	82	.401	24.5

== League Leaders ==
=== Batting leaders ===
Stat	Player	Total
AVG	Kevin Medrano, Tennessee Smokies	.331
H	Nick Solak, Montgomery Biscuits	135
R	Nick Solak, Montgomery Biscuits	91
2B	Corey Ray, Biloxi Shuckers; Brent Rooker, Chattanooga Lookouts	32
3B	Thomas Milone, Montgomery Biscuits	11
HR	Corey Ray, Biloxi Shuckers	27
RBI	Brent Rooker, Chattanooga Lookouts	79
SB	Corey Ray, Biloxi Shuckers	37

=== Pitching leaders ===
Stat	Player	Total
W	Nick Neidert, Jacksonville Jumbo Shrimp	12
ERA	Zack Brown, Biloxi Shuckers	2.44
CG	Robert Dugger, Jacksonville Jumbo Shrimp	3
SHO	Robert Dugger, Jacksonville Jumbo Shrimp	2
SV	Nate Griep, Biloxi Shuckers	34
IP	Nick Neidert, Jacksonville Jumbo Shrimp	152.2
SO	Taylor Widener, Jackson Generals	176

== Playoffs ==
- The Jackson Generals won their third Southern League championship, defeating the Biloxi Shuckers in four games.

=== Playoff bracket ===
Division finals
N1	Montgomery	2
N2	Jackson	3
S1	Biloxi	3
S2	Pensacola	1

Finals
N1	Jackson	3
S1	Biloxi	1

== Awards ==
Southern League awards
Award name	Recipient
Most Valuable Player	Corey Ray, Biloxi Shuckers
Pitcher of the Year	Zack Brown, Biloxi Shuckers
Manager of the Year	Mike Guerrero, Biloxi Shuckers

== See also ==
- 2018 Major League Baseball season
