= 2016 Southern League season =

- League: Southern League
- Sport: Baseball
- Duration: April 9 – September 7
- Number of games: 140
- Number of teams: 10

Regular season
- League champions: Jackson Generals
- Season MVP: Tyler O'Neill, Jackson Generals

Playoffs
- League champions: Jackson Generals
- Runners-up: Mississippi Braves

SL seasons
- ← 2015 2017 →

The 2016 Southern League was a Class AA baseball season played between April 9 and September 7. Ten teams played a 140-game schedule, with the top team in each division in each half of the season qualifying for the post-season.

The Jackson Generals won the Southern League championship, defeating the Mississippi Braves in the playoffs.

== Teams ==
2016 Southern League
Division	Team	City	MLB Affiliate	Stadium
North	Birmingham Barons	Birmingham, Alabama	Chicago White Sox	Regions Field
North	Chattanooga Lookouts	Chattanooga, Tennessee	Minnesota Twins	AT&T Field
North	Jackson Generals	Jackson, Tennessee	Seattle Mariners	The Ballpark at Jackson
North	Montgomery Biscuits	Montgomery, Alabama	Tampa Bay Rays	Montgomery Riverwalk Stadium
North	Tennessee Smokies	Sevierville, Tennessee	Chicago Cubs	Smokies Park
South	Biloxi Shuckers	Biloxi, Mississippi	Milwaukee Brewers	MGM Park
South	Jacksonville Suns	Jacksonville, Florida	Miami Marlins	Community First Park
South	Mississippi Braves	Jackson, Mississippi	Atlanta Braves	Trustmark Park
South	Mobile BayBears	Mobile, Alabama	Arizona Diamondbacks	Hank Aaron Stadium
South	Pensacola Blue Wahoos	Pensacola, Florida	Cincinnati Reds	Blue Wahoos Stadium

== Map of teams ==
North Division South Division

== Regular season ==
=== Summary ===
- The Jackson Generals finished the season with the best record in the league for the first time since 2012.

=== Standings ===
North Division
Team	Win	Loss	%	GB
Jackson Generals	84	55	.604	–
Montgomery Biscuits	76	64	.543	8.5
Chattanooga Lookouts	75	65	.536	9.5
Tennessee Smokies	58	81	.417	26
Birmingham Barons	49	91	.350	35.5
South Division
Pensacola Blue Wahoos	81	59	.579	–
Mississippi Braves	73	65	.529	7
Biloxi Shuckers	72	67	.518	8.5
Mobile BayBears	65	73	.471	15
Jacksonville Suns	63	76	.453	17.5

== League Leaders ==
=== Batting leaders ===
Stat	Player	Total
AVG	Ozzie Albies, Mississippi Braves	.321
H	Zack Granite, Chattanooga Lookouts	155
R	Willy Adames, Montgomery Biscuits	89
2B	Dustin Peterson, Mississippi Braves	38
3B	Adam Engel, Birmingham Barons; Leon Landry, Jackson Generals	9
HR	Kevin Cron, Mobile BayBears	26
RBI	Tyler O'Neill, Jackson Generals	102
SB	Zack Granite, Chattanooga Lookouts	56

=== Pitching leaders ===
Stat	Player	Total
W	Brett Ash, Jackson Generals; Taylor Guerrieri, Montgomery Biscuits; Ryan Yarborough, Jackson Generals	12
ERA	Barrett Astin, Pensacola Blue Wahoos	2.26
SV	Alejandro Chacín, Pensacola Blue Wahoos	30
IP	Sal Romano, Pensacola Blue Wahoos	156.0
SO	Sean Newcomb, Mississippi Braves	152

== Playoffs ==
- The Jackson Generals won their second Southern League championship, defeating the Mississippi Braves in three games.

=== Playoff bracket ===
Division finals
N1	Jackson	3
N2	Montgomery	1
S1	Pensacola	1
S2	Mississippi	3

Finals
N1	Jackson	3
S2	Mississippi	0

== Awards ==
Southern League awards
Award name	Recipient
Most Valuable Player	Tyler O'Neill, Jackson Generals
Pitcher of the Year	Ryan Yarbrough, Jackson Generals
Manager of the Year	Daren Brown, Jackson Generals

== See also ==
- 2016 Major League Baseball season
