= 2014 Southern League season =

- League: Southern League
- Sport: Baseball
- Duration: April 3 – September 1
- Number of games: 140
- Number of teams: 10

Regular season
- League champions: Mississippi Braves
- Season MVP: Jake Lamb, Mobile BayBears

Playoffs
- League champions: Jacksonville Suns
- Runners-up: Chattanooga Lookouts

SL seasons
- ← 2013 2015 →

The 2014 Southern League was a Class AA baseball season played between April 3 and September 1. Ten teams played a 140-game schedule, with the top team in each division in each half of the season qualifying for the post-season.

The Jacksonville Suns won the Southern League championship, defeating the Chattanooga Lookouts in the playoffs.

== Teams ==
2014 Southern League
Division	Team	City	MLB Affiliate	Stadium
North	Birmingham Barons	Birmingham, Alabama	Chicago White Sox	Regions Field
North	Chattanooga Lookouts	Chattanooga, Tennessee	Los Angeles Dodgers	AT&T Field
North	Huntsville Stars	Huntsville, Alabama	Milwaukee Brewers	Joe W. Davis Stadium
North	Jackson Generals	Jackson, Tennessee	Seattle Mariners	The Ballpark at Jackson
North	Tennessee Smokies	Sevierville, Tennessee	Chicago Cubs	Smokies Park
South	Jacksonville Suns	Jacksonville, Florida	Miami Marlins	Baseball Grounds of Jacksonville
South	Mississippi Braves	Jackson, Mississippi	Atlanta Braves	Trustmark Park
South	Mobile BayBears	Mobile, Alabama	Arizona Diamondbacks	Hank Aaron Stadium
South	Montgomery Biscuits	Montgomery, Alabama	Tampa Bay Rays	Montgomery Riverwalk Stadium
South	Pensacola Blue Wahoos	Pensacola, Florida	Cincinnati Reds	Blue Wahoos Stadium

== Map of teams ==
North Division South Division

== Regular season ==
=== Summary ===
- The Mississippi Braves finished the season with the best record in the league for the first time in franchise history.
- Despite finishing with the best record in the league, the Mississippi Braves failed to qualify for the post-season as they did not have the best record in the South Division in either half of the season.

=== Standings ===
North Division
Team	Win	Loss	%	GB
Huntsville Stars	77	63	.550	–
Tennessee Smokies	66	73	.475	10.5
Jackson Generals	63	76	.453	13.5
Chattanooga Lookouts	61	77	.442	15
Birmingham Barons	60	80	.429	17
South Division
Mississippi Braves	83	56	.597	–
Jacksonville Suns	81	59	.579	2.5
Mobile BayBears	79	58	.577	3
Montgomery Biscuits	66	74	.471	17.5
Pensacola Blue Wahoos	60	80	.429	23.5

== League Leaders ==
=== Batting leaders ===
Stat	Player	Total
AVG	Jake Lamb, Mobile BayBears	.318
H	Daniel Mayora, Chattanooga Lookouts	149
R	Darnell Sweeney, Chattanooga Lookouts	88
2B	Rangel Ravelo, Birmingham Barons	37
3B	Scott Schebler, Chattanooga Lookouts	14
HR	Scott Schebler, Chattanooga Lookouts	28
RBI	Nick Ramirez, Huntsville Stars	82
SB	Josh Prince, Huntsville Stars	37

=== Pitching leaders ===
Stat	Player	Total
W	Justin Nicolino, Jacksonville Suns	14
ERA	Justin Nicolino, Jacksonville Suns	2.85
CG	Dylan Floro, Montgomery Biscuits	3
SHO	Dylan Floro, Montgomery Biscuits; Justin Nicolino, Jacksonville Suns; Steve Smith, Chattanooga Lookouts	2
SV	David Goforth, Huntsville Stars	27
IP	Dylan Floro, Montgomery Biscuits	178.2
SO	Robert Stephenson, Pensacola Blue Wahoos	140

== Playoffs ==
- The Jacksonville Suns won their sixth Southern League championship, defeating the Chattanooga Lookouts in three games.

=== Playoff bracket ===
Division finals
N1	Huntsville	2
N2	Chattanooga	3
S1	Jacksonville	3
S2	Mobile	1

Finals
N2	Chattanooga	0
S1	Jacksonville	3

== Awards ==
Southern League awards
Award name	Recipient
Most Valuable Player	Jake Lamb, Mobile BayBears
Pitcher of the Year	Justin Nicolino, Jacksonville Suns
Manager of the Year	Andy Green, Mobile BayBears

== See also ==
- 2014 Major League Baseball season
