= 2015 Southern League season =

- League: Southern League
- Sport: Baseball
- Duration: April 9 – September 7
- Number of games: 140
- Number of teams: 10

Regular season
- League champions: Biloxi Shuckers
- Season MVP: Max Kepler, Chattanooga Lookouts

Playoffs
- League champions: Chattanooga Lookouts
- Runners-up: Biloxi Shuckers

SL seasons
- ← 2014 2016 →

The 2015 Southern League was a Class AA baseball season played between April 9 and September 7. Ten teams played a 140-game schedule, with the top team in each division in each half of the season qualifying for the post-season.

The Chattanooga Lookouts won the Southern League championship, defeating the Biloxi Shuckers in the playoffs.

== Team changes ==
- The Huntsville Stars relocated to Biloxi, Mississippi and were renamed the Biloxi Shuckers. The club moved from the North Division to the South Division and remained affiliated with the Milwaukee Brewers.
- The Montgomery Biscuits moved from the South Division to the North Division.
- The Chattanooga Lookouts ended their affiliation with the Los Angeles Dodgers and began a new affiliation with the Minnesota Twins.

== Teams ==
2015 Southern League
Division	Team	City	MLB Affiliate	Stadium
North	Birmingham Barons	Birmingham, Alabama	Chicago White Sox	Regions Field
North	Chattanooga Lookouts	Chattanooga, Tennessee	Minnesota Twins	AT&T Field
North	Jackson Generals	Jackson, Tennessee	Seattle Mariners	The Ballpark at Jackson
North	Montgomery Biscuits	Montgomery, Alabama	Tampa Bay Rays	Montgomery Riverwalk Stadium
North	Tennessee Smokies	Sevierville, Tennessee	Chicago Cubs	Smokies Park
South	Biloxi Shuckers	Biloxi, Mississippi	Milwaukee Brewers	MGM Park
South	Jacksonville Suns	Jacksonville, Florida	Miami Marlins	Community First Park
South	Mississippi Braves	Jackson, Mississippi	Atlanta Braves	Trustmark Park
South	Mobile BayBears	Mobile, Alabama	Arizona Diamondbacks	Hank Aaron Stadium
South	Pensacola Blue Wahoos	Pensacola, Florida	Cincinnati Reds	Blue Wahoos Stadium

== Map of teams ==
North Division South Division

== Regular season ==
=== Summary ===
- The Biloxi Shuckers finished the season with the best record in the league for the first time in franchise history.

=== Standings ===
North Division
Team	Win	Loss	%	GB
Montgomery Biscuits	77	61	.558	–
Chattanooga Lookouts	76	61	.555	0.5
Tennessee Smokies	76	63	.547	1.5
Birmingham Barons	69	70	.496	8.5
Jackson Generals	53	84	.387	23.5
South Division
Biloxi Shuckers	78	59	.569	–
Mobile BayBears	70	67	.511	8
Mississippi Braves	69	67	.507	8.5
Pensacola Blue Wahoos	63	75	.457	15.5
Jacksonville Suns	57	81	.413	21.5

== League Leaders ==
=== Batting leaders ===
Stat	Player	Total
AVG	Willson Contreras, Tennessee Smokies	.333
H	Tim Anderson, Birmingham Barons	160
R	Tim Anderson, Birmingham Barons	79
2B	Orlando Arcia, Biloxi Shuckers	37
3B	Socrates Brito, Mobile BayBears	15
HR	Adam Walker, Chattanooga Lookouts	31
RBI	Adam Walker, Chattanooga Lookouts	106
SB	Tim Anderson, Birmingham Barons	49

=== Pitching leaders ===
Stat	Player	Total
W	Myles Jaye, Birmingham Barons; Jorge López, Biloxi Shuckers	12
ERA	Tyler Wagner, Biloxi Shuckers	2.25
CG	Tyrell Jenkins, Mississippi Braves	3
SHO	Frank Batista, Tennessee Smokies; José Berríos, Chattanooga Lookouts; Brett Lee, Chattanooga Lookouts; Frankie Montas, Birmingham Barons; Austin Pruitt, Montgomery Biscuits; Tyler Wagner, Biloxi Shuckers	1
SV	Zack Weiss, Pensacola Blue Wahoos	25
IP	Austin Pruitt, Montgomery Biscuits	160.0
SO	Jaime Schultz, Montgomery Biscuits	168

== Playoffs ==
- The Chattanooga Lookouts won their second Southern League championship, defeating the Biloxi Shuckers in five games.

=== Playoff bracket ===
Division finals
N1	Montgomery	1
N2	Chattanooga	3
S1	Biloxi	3
S2	Pensacola	0

Finals
N2	Chattanooga	3
S1	Biloxi	2

== Awards ==
Southern League awards
Award name	Recipient
Most Valuable Player	Max Kepler, Chattanooga Lookouts
Pitcher of the Year	Jorge López, Biloxi Shuckers
Manager of the Year	Carlos Subero, Biloxi Shuckers

== See also ==
- 2015 Major League Baseball season
