= David Kerr (baseball executive) =

American baseball executive

- David Kerr with the Mississippi Mud Monsters
- Born: Cuyahoga Falls, Ohio
- Education: Henderson State University
- Occupation: Baseball executive
- Employer: Mississippi Mud Monsters
- Title: General manager

David Kerr is an American baseball executive who is the general manager of the Mississippi Mud Monsters of the Frontier League.

He previously worked for the Mississippi Braves and Gary SouthShore RailCats and began working in professional baseball with the Arkansas Travelers while attending Henderson State University.

== Early life and education ==
Kerr is from Cuyahoga Falls, Ohio. His family later moved to Arkansas, and by the time he was in high school he was living in the Little Rock area.

Kerr attended Henderson State University in Arkadelphia, Arkansas, where he studied communication and mass media. He competed in collegiate debate and was described by Ballpark Digest as a world champion collegiate debater.

While attending Henderson State, Kerr approached the Arkansas Travelers seeking work with the organization. He was hired as a game-day usher in 2006. After graduating, Kerr worked in the telecommunications industry before returning to professional baseball.

== Baseball career ==
=== Gary SouthShore RailCats ===
Kerr joined the Gary SouthShore RailCats of the independent American Association in 2014. He worked as an account executive during the 2014 and 2015 seasons before becoming director of marketing and promotions in 2016.

In that role, Kerr worked in marketing, promotions and game entertainment. A 2019 profile by GreatNews.Life detailed his involvement in promotions including themed events and sensory-inclusive programming for fans with autism.

Kerr remained with the RailCats through the 2019 season.

=== Mississippi Braves ===
In October 2019, Kerr joined the Mississippi Braves, then the Double-A affiliate of the Atlanta Braves, as director of group sales. He remained with the organization through its final season in Mississippi in 2024, ultimately serving as director of ticket sales.

In 2022, Kerr was named to the Top 40 Under 40 list published by Hometown Rankin.

The Mississippi Braves relocated following the 2024 season, ending the franchise's tenure at Trustmark Park in Pearl, Mississippi.

=== Mississippi Mud Monsters ===
Kerr remained at Trustmark Park following the departure of the Mississippi Braves and joined the newly established Mississippi Mud Monsters as assistant general manager in October 2024.

The Mud Monsters joined the Frontier League and began play in 2025.

Kerr participated in the development and public launch of the club's identity. He appeared with team ownership at the October 2024 unveiling of the Mud Monsters name and logo at Trustmark Park and discussed the branding and its connection to Mississippi.

In a November 2024 interview with Hometown Rankin, Kerr described his role with the organization as overseeing sales, marketing and the fan experience.

During his tenure as assistant general manager, Kerr was involved in areas including ticket sales, corporate partnerships, marketing, promotions and events.

On September 8, 2026, Kerr was promoted to general manager of the Mud Monsters and was formally introduced in the position during a press conference at Trustmark Park.
