= Victor Mateo =

Dominican baseball player (born 1989)

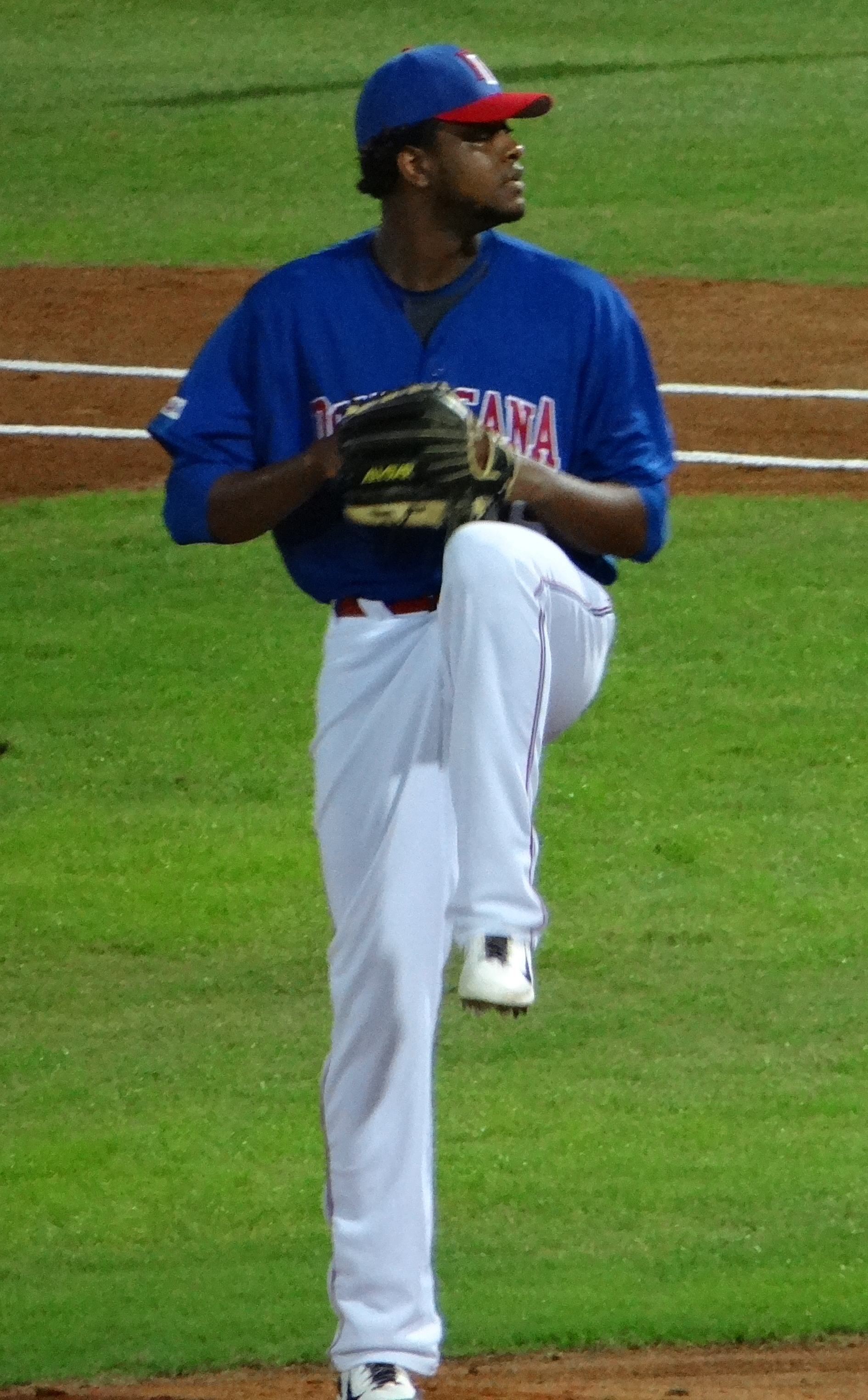
- Mateo pitching for the Dominican Republic national team in 2015 WBSC Premier12 warm-up game

Free agent
- Pitcher
- Born: July 29, 1989 (age 36); Santo Domingo Dominican Republic
- Bats: Right Throws: Right
- Stats at Baseball Reference

Victor Alexander Mateo Nadera (born July 27, 1989) is a Dominican professional baseball pitcher who is a free agent.

== Career ==
=== Tampa Bay Devil Rays / Tampa Bay Rays ===
He was born in the Dominican Republic city of Santo Domingo. He was signed by the Tampa Bay Devil Rays as a non-drafted free agent on November 15, 2006. Starting his professional career the next year, the 17-year-old went 0–2 with a 6.39 ERA in 38 innings for the DSL Devil Rays his first campaign. The next year, back with the Dominican Summer League club, he went 3–4 with a 4.07 ERA in 48.2 innings. With the GCL Rays in 2010, Mateo was 3–4 with a 1.98 ERA in 10 games (nine starts), walking only nine batters in 50 innings. He tied for the team lead in victories and led the squad in games started. In 2010, Mateo was 2–5 with a 4.89 ERA in 15 games (five starts) for the Princeton Rays.

2011 was Mateo's first 10-win campaign, as he went 12–6 with a 3.98 ERA in 26 games (20 starts) for the Bowling Green Hot Rods. During the week of July 11, he earned Pitcher of the Week honors as he tossed a no hitter against the Lake County Captains on July 8. He was one of only two players on the team to toss a complete-game shutout, with the other being C.J. Riefenhauser. He pitched for the Charlotte Stone Crabs in 2012 and went 6–5 with a 4.31 ERA in 30 games (16 starts). With the Montgomery Biscuits in 2013, Mateo was 7–9 with a 3.93 ERA in 27 games. He tossed two complete-game shutouts, including another no hitter—this time against the Jacksonville Suns on August 24. He was the only pitcher on the team to toss a complete game. He also led the team in innings pitched (153.1) and team starters in WHIP (1.141). He was the only pitcher in the Southern League to throw two shutouts. During the 2013-2014 winter league season, he pitched briefly for the Tigres de Aragua of the Venezuelan Winter League and Estrellas de Oriente of the Dominican Winter League. In 2014, he went 12–11 with a 3.90 ERA in 28 starts for the Biscuits, completing two games. He led the team in wins and tied Dylan Floro for the club lead in starts. He also tied Floro, Drew Gagnon and Justin Nicolino for the Southern League lead in starts. He made the Southern League Mid-Season All-Star team that year.

=== Atlanta Braves ===
On November 13, 2014, Mateo signed a minor league contract with the Atlanta Braves. He began the 2015 season with the Double–A Mississippi Braves, but was promoted to the Triple–A Gwinnett Braves partway through the season. In 27 games (25 starts) for the two affiliates, Mateo compiled a 10–9 record and 3.41 ERA with 78 strikeouts across 147 2/3 innings pitched.

Mateo split the 2016 campaign between Mississippi and Gwinnett, accumulating a 6.71 ERA with 31 strikeouts across 22 total appearances. He elected free agency following the season on November 7, 2016.

== International career ==
In December 2015, he was selected to the roster for the Dominican Republic national baseball team at the 2015 WBSC Premier12.
