= Mississippi Mud Monsters =

Frontier League baseball team in Mississippi, United States

Logo
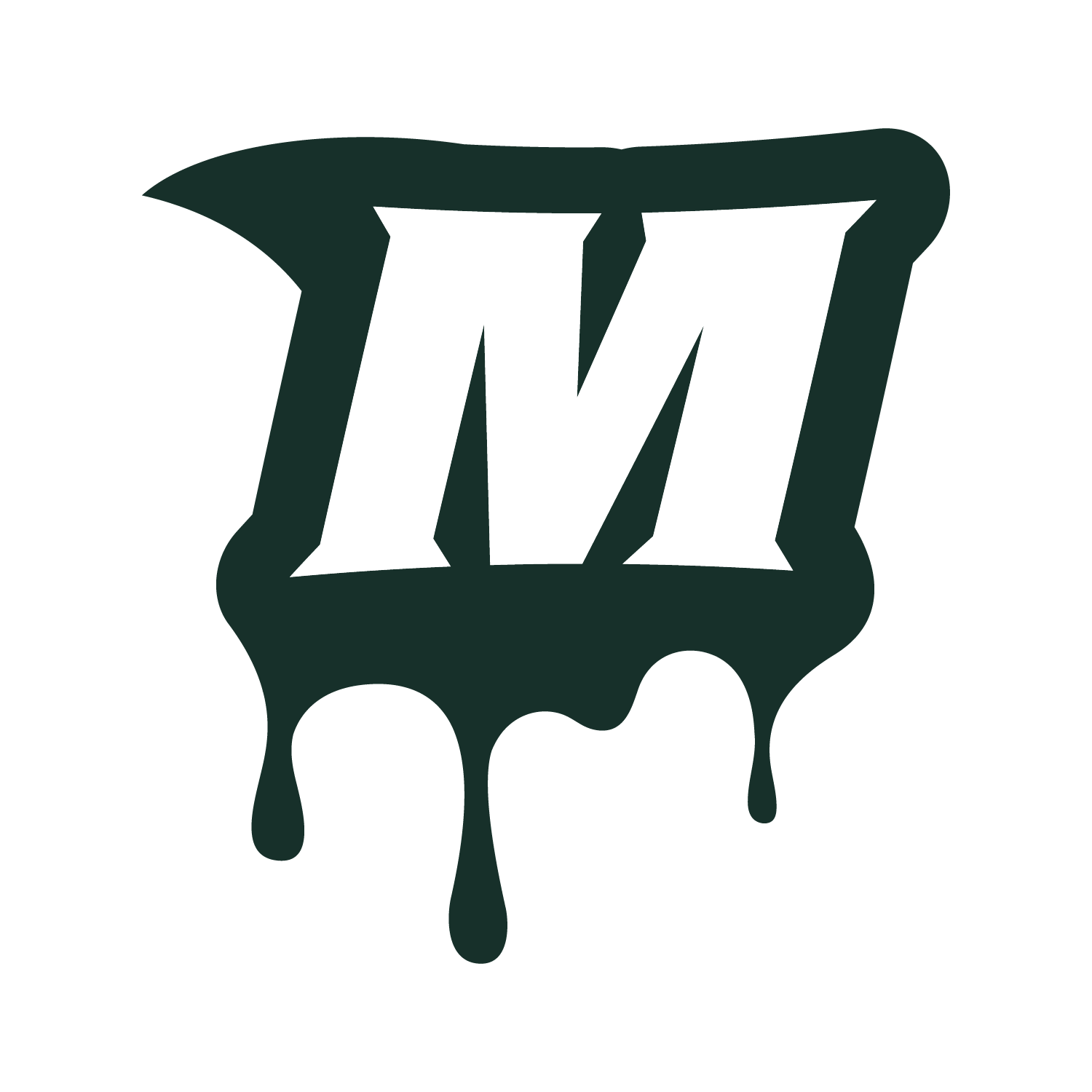
Cap insignia

Information
- League: National Association of Professional Baseball (2025–present) (West Division)
- Location: Pearl, Mississippi
- Ballpark: Trustmark Park (2025–present)
- Founded: 2025
- Colors: Deep teal, murky aquamarine, cypress green, phantom mint, pirate gold, black
- Ownership: Joseph Eng
- General manager: David Kerr
- Manager: Jay Pecci
- Media: HomeTeam Network
- Website: mudmonstersbaseball.com

The Mississippi Mud Monsters are a professional baseball team based in Pearl, Mississippi, that competes in the National Association of Professional Baseball (NAPB) as a member of the West Division in the Midwest Conference. They play their home games at Trustmark Park, which was previously the home of the Mississippi Braves, the former Double-A affiliate of the Atlanta Braves, from 2005 to 2024.

== History ==
=== Background and formation ===
On September 9, 2024, the Frontier League, a Major League Baseball Partner League, announced that it had awarded an expansion franchise to Pearl, Mississippi, following the Mississippi Braves' previously announced relocation to Columbus, Georgia. The announcement ensured that professional baseball would continue at Trustmark Park after 20 seasons of Mississippi Braves baseball.

The franchise was initially announced under the placeholder name "On Deck 2025" while a public name-the-team contest was conducted. Joseph Eng was announced as the team's owner. David Kerr was named assistant general manager in October 2024, with responsibilities including sales, marketing, and fan engagement. Andrew Seymour was named general manager in December 2024.

In October 2024, the Mud Monsters announced their inaugural 2025 schedule. The team was scheduled to open play at Trustmark Park against the Florence Y'alls on May 8, as part of a 96-game season that included 48 home games across nine homestands.

=== Name and branding ===
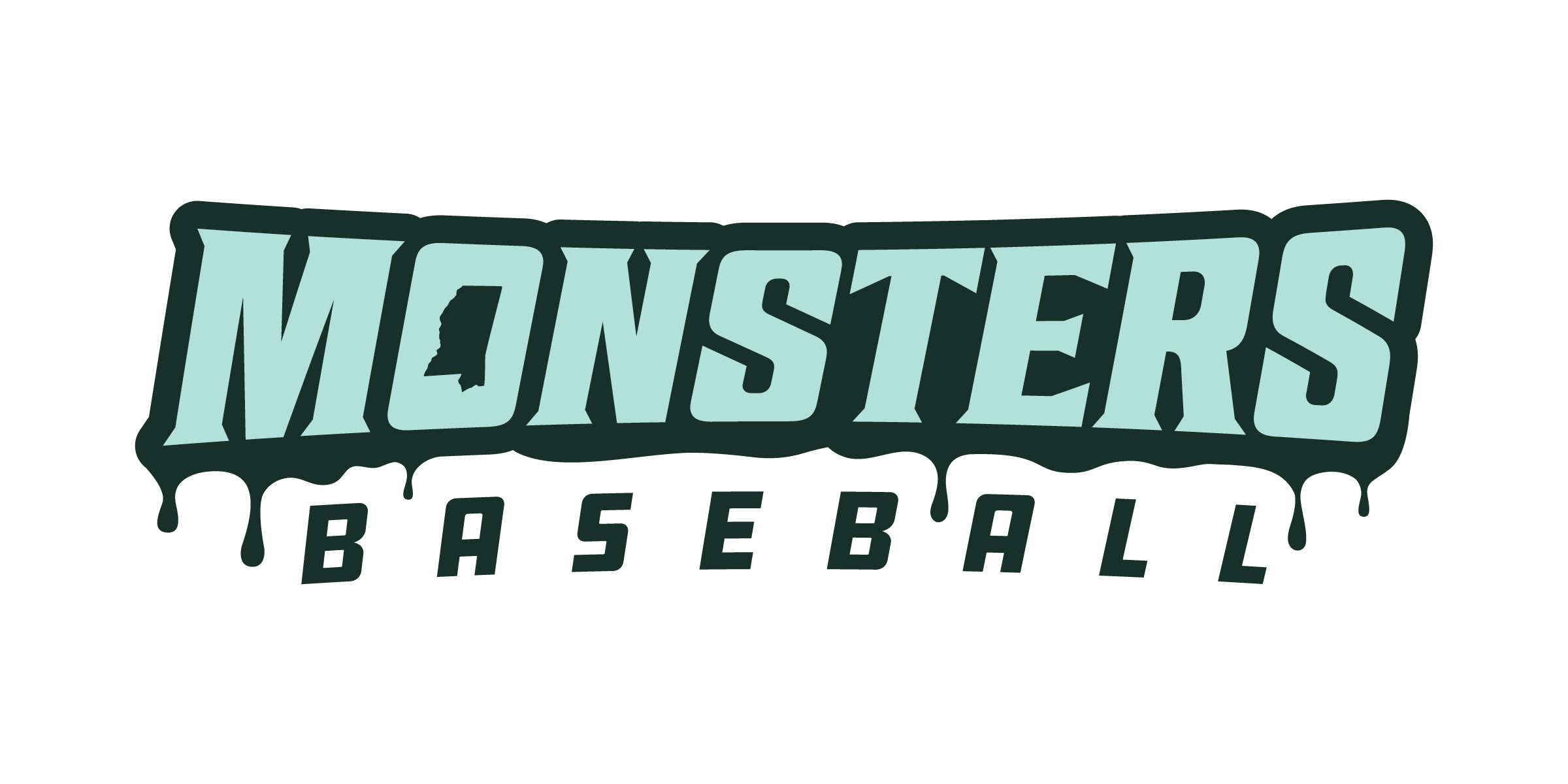
Monsters wordmark

Fans were given three choices in the team's name-the-team contest: "Mississippi Mud Monsters", "Mississippi Grits", and "Mississippi Soul Shakers". The contest ran from September 9 through September 26, 2024. On September 27, the team announced that "Mud Monsters" had won the vote with more than 5,600 votes. The team's logo was revealed on October 10, with a catfish as the primary mark. The team's official color palette includes Deep Teal, Murky Aquamarine, Cypress Green, Phantom Mint, Pirate Gold, and black.

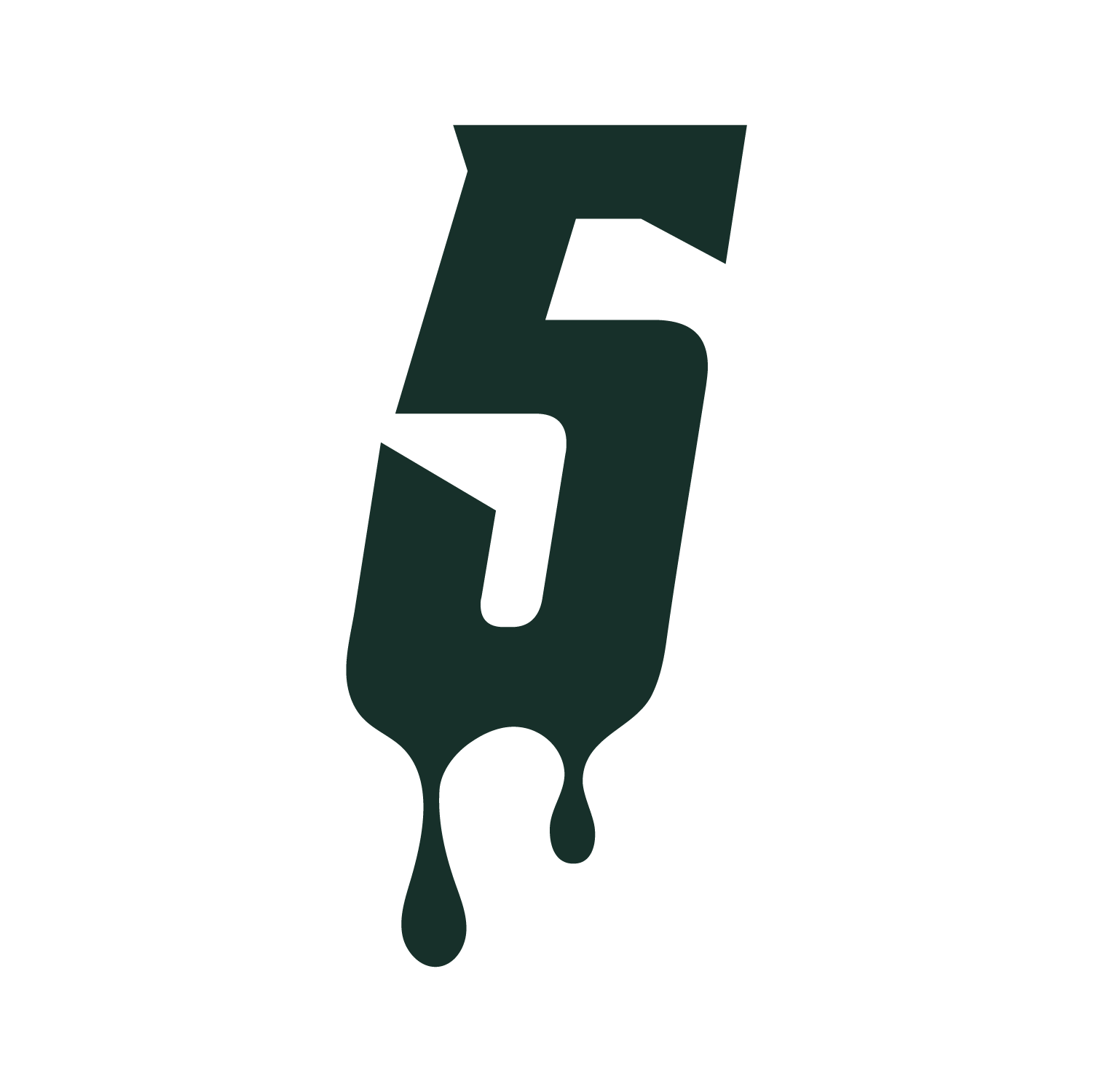
Example of the Mud Monsters' "Creature Flow" uniform number style

In April 2025, the Mud Monsters unveiled their inaugural uniforms. The initial set included teal, white, and black jersey options, three matching pant options, and two hat choices, allowing for 18 uniform combinations. The uniforms included a custom number style called "Creature Flow", which featured drip-like forms designed to match the team's branding. In 2025, the Cirlot Agency's work for the Mississippi Mud Monsters was named a finalist in the Community Relations category of PR Daily's Media Relations Awards.

In April 2026, the team launched an online team store that sold Mud Monsters merchandise.

=== Ballpark partnerships ===
In January 2025, the Mud Monsters and Belhaven University announced a partnership for Trustmark Park to serve as the home of Belhaven Blazers baseball from 2025 through 2030. Under the agreement, Belhaven's NCAA Division III baseball team would use Trustmark Park for games, practices, and showcases.

=== Trustmark Park operations and events ===
In September 2025, the Mud Monsters announced that Trustmark Park would replace its infield dirt and grass with synthetic turf. The organization said Spectrum Entertainment would install Major Play Matrix synthetic turf covering more than 40,000 square feet. The turf project followed several rainouts and field-condition issues at the ballpark, including an Ole Miss-Southern Miss game in 2023 that was cancelled during play because of infield sod conditions. General manager Andrew Seymour said the new infield would help reduce rain delays and make the venue more usable for concerts, showcases, and community events.

During the Mud Monsters' first year operating Trustmark Park, the ballpark hosted additional community and non-baseball events, including Main Street Pearl's Oktoberfest during the day and MonstoBEERfest, a ticketed beer festival, that evening. Later that year, Trustmark Park hosted The Southern Lights, a walk-through holiday attraction featuring more than 2.5 million lights, real-ice skating, fire pits, and train rides.

In 2026, Trustmark Park was selected to host the MLB HBCU Power Series, a multi-day historically black colleges and universities (HBCU) baseball showcase held in conjunction with Major League Baseball. The series, held from February 12–15, included Texas Southern, Prairie View A&M, Alabama A&M, Grambling State, Jackson State, and Alcorn State.

The 2026 Mississippi Farm Bureau Governor's Cup at Trustmark Park drew 8,223 fans and was announced as a sellout.

=== 2025 inaugural season ===
On January 13, 2025, the Mud Monsters announced Jay Pecci as their inaugural field manager. The first player announced by the franchise was outfielder Brayland Skinner, a Lake Cormorant, Mississippi, native and former Mississippi State Bulldogs player who was part of the team's 2021 national championship.

The Mud Monsters played their inaugural game at Trustmark Park on May 8, 2025, against the Florence Y'alls, winning 13–2. The game drew 4,552 fans and marked the Frontier League's debut in Mississippi. Skinner scored the first run in franchise history in the bottom of the first inning, and catcher Victor Diaz recorded the team's first hit one inning later.

The Mud Monsters completed their inaugural season with a 49–47 record, finishing third in the West Division of the Midwest Conference and missing the league playoffs.

During the 2025 season, two Mud Monsters pitchers signed with Major League Baseball organizations. Left-handed pitcher Zack Morris signed with the Colorado Rockies in June. Right-handed pitcher Michael Fowler later signed with the Milwaukee Brewers after pitching for Mississippi.

=== 2026 season ===
In May 2026, two Mud Monsters pitchers signed with Major League Baseball organizations. Left-handed pitcher Cole Cheatham signed a minor-league contract with the Seattle Mariners and was assigned to the ACL Mariners. Right-handed pitcher Preston Johnson had his contract purchased by the Minnesota Twins organization after two starts with Mississippi, during which he struck out 18 batters across 11.0 innings. MLB.com listed Johnson as signing a minor-league contract with Minnesota on May 18, 2026, and being assigned to the FCL Twins on May 19.

In July, outfielder Brayland Skinner and right-handed pitcher Chris Barraza were selected to the Midwest Conference roster for the 2026 Frontier League All-Star Game. Skinner was selected as a starting outfielder, while Barraza was named to the pitching staff.

The Mud Monsters finished the 2026 season with a 40–61 record, placing fifth in the West Division. In the season finale on September 6, right-handed pitcher Brian Williams became the first pitcher in franchise history to record 100 strikeouts in a season as Mississippi defeated the Gateway Grizzlies 8–2.

On September 8, 2026, Kerr was named general manager of the Mud Monsters after serving as assistant general manager since 2024.

== Mascot ==
The team's official mascot is Fish. The character was introduced by the team in April 2025 and is described by the club as having the whiskers of a catfish and the fins of a gar.

== Season-by-season records ==
Season	W-L record	Win %	Finish	Playoffs
2025	49–47	.510	3rd in West Division	Did not qualify
2026	40–61	.396	5th in West Division	Did not qualify
Totals	89–108	.452	—N/a	—N/a

== Current roster ==
Mississippi Mud Monsters roster
Active roster	Coaching staff
Pitchers: 34 Hunter Belton; 16 Jackson Smith; 45 Brian Williams; 30 Connor Langrell; 25 Dallas Woolfolk; 35 Jase Schueller; 17 Brayden Sanders; 36 Tyler Campbell; 13 Sergio Sanchez; 20 John Walsh; 44 Julian Minaya; 27 Braden Forsyth; 21 Joe Taylor; 32 Art Joven (14-day); 28 Tristan House (7-day); Utility players: 2 Vantrel Reed (7-day); Catchers: 10 Gray Bane; 3 Tevis Payne II; 43 Kevin Brown (emergency catcher); 29 Victor Diaz (60-day); Infielders: 15 Joshua Shelly; 4 Travis Holt; 7 Slater Schield; 9 AJ Fritz; 6 Amani Larry; 14 Jack Holman (60-day); Outfielders: 1 Kyle Booker; 5 Brayland Skinner; 18 Kasten Furr; 22 Karell Paz; 23 Trey Bridges	Manager: 12 Jay Pecci; Coaches: 11 Kurt Takahashi (pitching); 26 James McOwen (hitting); 43 Kevin Brown (catching coordinator); -- Lucas Duffy (director of analytics); -- Marc Osborne (athletic trainer); 31 Neil Ring (first base); Disabled list; ‡ Inactive list; § Suspended list; updated September 1, 2026 Transactions
