= Braxton Lee =

American baseball player (born 1993)

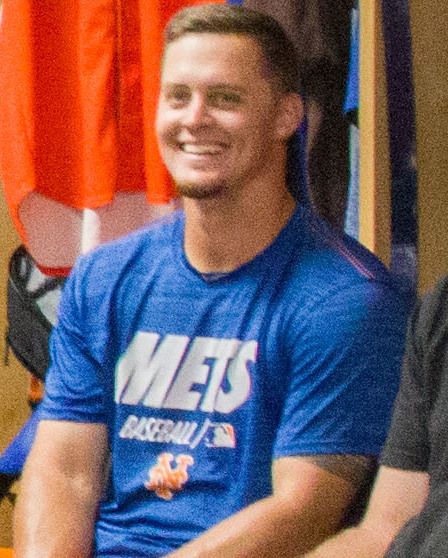
- Lee with the Syracuse Mets in 2019
- Outfielder
- Born: August 23, 1993 (age 32); Picayune, Mississippi, U.S.
- Batted: Left Threw: Right

MLB debut
- March 30, 2018, for the Miami Marlins

Last MLB appearance
- April 11, 2018, for the Miami Marlins

MLB statistics
- Batting average: .176
- Home runs: 0
- Runs batted in: 2
- Stats at Baseball Reference

Teams
- Miami Marlins (2018)

Braxton Russell Lee (born August 23, 1993) is an American former professional baseball outfielder and hitting coach. He has previously played in Major League Baseball (MLB) for the Miami Marlins in 2018.

== Playing career ==
=== Tampa Bay Rays ===
Lee attended Picayune High School in Picayune, Mississippi and played college baseball at Pearl River Community College and the University of Mississippi. He was drafted by the Tampa Bay Rays in the 12th round of the 2014 Major League Baseball draft. He spent his first professional season with the Hudson Valley Renegades and batted .287 with 13 RBI and 12 stolen bases in 51 games. He played for the Charlotte Stone Crabs in 2015 and posted a .281 batting average with 24 RBIs in 115 games, and for the Montgomery Biscuits in 2016 where he slashed .209/.269/256 with 25 RBI in 110 games.

=== Miami Marlins ===
Lee started 2017 with the Montgomery Biscuits. On June 26, he was traded, along with Ethan Clark, to the Miami Marlins for Adeiny Hechavarria. The Marlins assigned him to the Jacksonville Jumbo Shrimp where he spent the rest of the season. In 127 combined games between Montgomery and Jacksonville, he batted .309 with three home runs, 37 RBI and twenty stolen bases. After the season, Lee played in the Arizona Fall League and was selected to play in the Fall Stars Game. The Marlins added him to their 40-man roster after the season.

The Marlins added Lee to their 2018 Opening Day 25-man roster. Lee went 3-for-17 in eight major league games in 2018. On November 20, 2018, Lee was designated for assignment by Miami.

=== New York Mets ===
At the 2018 Winter Meetings, the New York Mets selected Lee from the Marlins in the minor league phase of the Rule 5 draft. Lee spent the 2019 season between the Binghamton Rumble Ponies and the Syracuse Mets. Lee did not play in a game in 2020 due to the cancellation of the minor league season because of the COVID-19 pandemic. He became a free agent on November 2, 2020.

=== Southern Maryland Blue Crabs ===
On April 8, 2021, Lee signed with the Southern Maryland Blue Crabs of the Atlantic League of Professional Baseball. Lee went 7-for-16 with one home run in four games for the Blue Crabs.

=== Cincinnati Reds ===
On June 3, 2021, Lee's contract was purchased by the Cincinnati Reds organization. He played in 80 games split between the Double-A Chattanooga Lookouts and Triple-A Louisville Bats, batting a cumulative .224/.298/.293 with no home runs, 28 RBI and three stolen bases. Lee elected free agency following the season on November 7.

=== Southern Maryland Blue Crabs (second stint) ===
On April 1, 2022, Lee signed a contract to return to the Southern Maryland Blue Crabs of the Atlantic League of Professional Baseball. On August 9, in a 7–3 victory against the High Point Rockers, Lee set the Atlantic League record for triples in a game, tallying three three-baggers in the game. In 116 total appearances for the Blue Crabs, he slashed .306/.364/.431 with three home runs, 73 RBI, and 19 stolen bases.

On January 27, 2023, Lee re-signed with the Blue Crabs as a player-coach, assuming the role of hitting coach as well. In 118 games he slashed .292/.383/.462 with 11 home runs 71 RBI, and 12 stolen bases. Lee became a free agent following the season.

== Coaching career ==
In 2024, Lee was hired to serve as the hitting coach for the Arizona Complex League Giants, the rookie-level affiliate of the San Francisco Giants. On January 23, 2026, Lee was announced as the hitting coach for the Eugene Emeralds, San Francisco's High-A affiliate.

== See also ==
- Rule 5 draft results
