= Regions Field =

Baseball venue in Birmingham, Alabama, U.S.

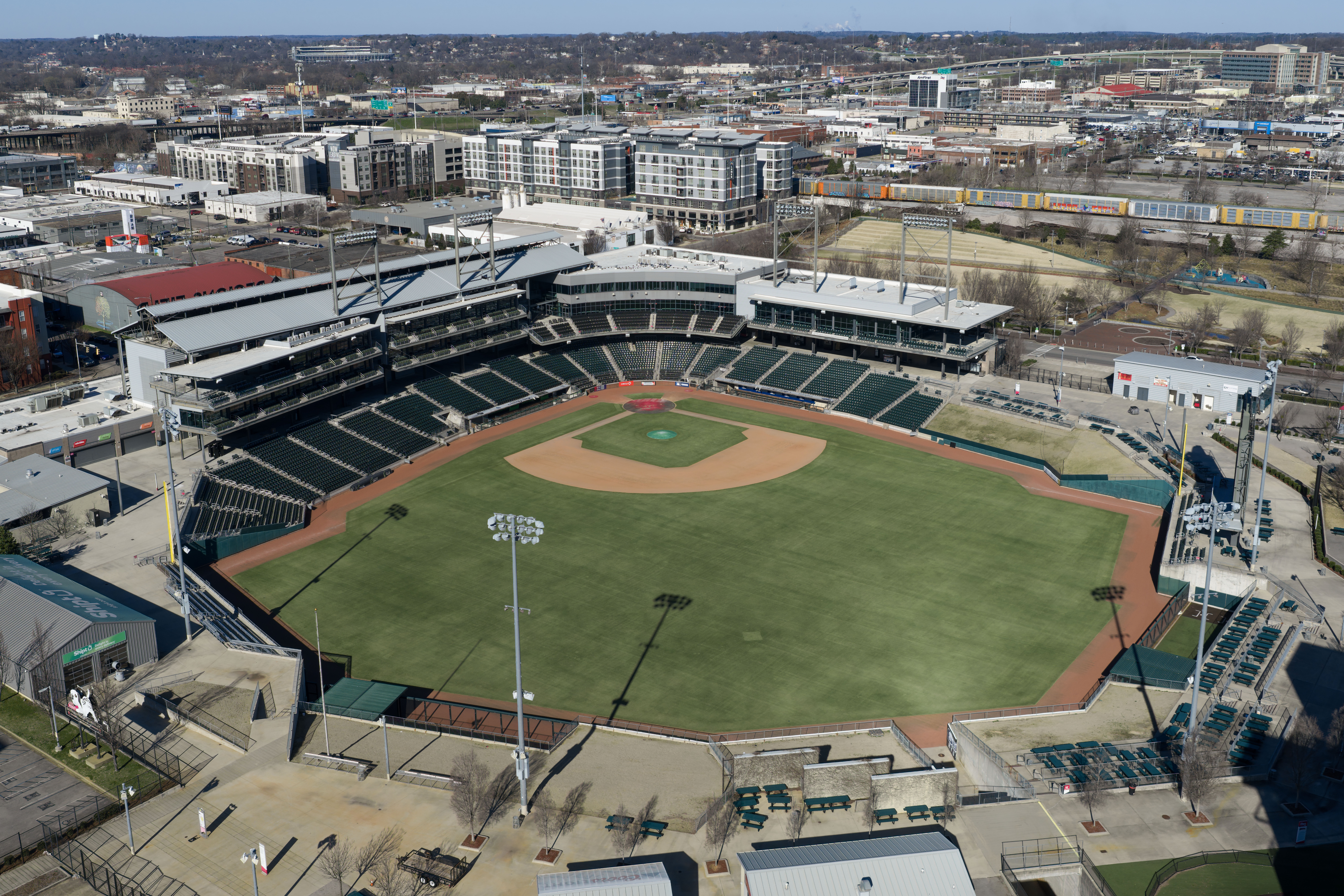
- Aerial view

- Location within Alabama Location within the United States
- Address: 1401 First Avenue South; Birmingham, Alabama; United States
- Coordinates: 33.50763°N 86.810218°W
- Owner: City of Birmingham
- Operator: Birmingham Baseball Club, Inc.
- Capacity: 8,500
- Surface: Natural grass
- Field size: Left Field: 320 ft (98 m); Center Field: 400 ft (120 m); Right Field: 325 ft (99 m)

Construction
- Groundbreaking: February 2, 2012
- Opened: April 10, 2013
- Cost: $64 million ($88.5 million in 2025 dollars)
- Architects: HKS, Inc. Hoskins Architecture; GA Studio
- Structural engineer: MBA Structural Engineers
- Services engineers: KHAFRA Engineering Consultants, Inc.
- General contractors: Robins & Morton/A. G. Gaston

Tenants
- Birmingham Barons (SL) (2013–present); UAB Blazers (NCAA Division I) (2014–present)

Regions Field is a minor league baseball park in the Southside community of Birmingham, Alabama, U.S. It is the home field for the Birmingham Barons of the Southern League, and it replaced Hoover Metropolitan Stadium in the Birmingham suburb of Hoover as their home field. It also serves as the second home field along with Jerry D. Young Memorial Field for the UAB Blazers. Regions Field is located adjacent to the Railroad Park, just south of downtown Birmingham.

Baseball in Birmingham traces its history to 1885 with the establishment of the original Barons, and from 1910 to 1987, professional baseball teams called Rickwood Field home. In 1988, the Barons moved to Hoover Metropolitan Stadium, leaving the city of Birmingham without professional baseball. In 2009, a proposal surfaced to build a downtown stadium to bring baseball back to Birmingham. After a feasibility study was completed, in October 2010, the city lodging tax was increased to finance its construction and in November 2010, a tentative agreement was reached to bring the Barons back to Birmingham. Groundbreaking ceremonies were held for the new facility on February 2, 2012, and the park celebrated its grand opening on April 10, 2013.

== History ==
The history of professional baseball in Birmingham began with the establishment of the Barons as one of the charter members of the original Southern League in 1885. In 1910, the Barons moved into Rickwood Field, and professional baseball in Birmingham was played exclusively at Rickwood through 1987. The final game played at Rickwood with the Barons as the primary tenant occurred on September 9, 1987, when they lost to the Charlotte O's 5–4 in the second game of the Southern League championship series. The following season, the Barons moved into the Hoover Metropolitan Stadium in the suburb of Hoover. From 1988 to 2013, the only professional baseball played in Birmingham was the annual Rickwood Classic, established in 1996.

After two decades without baseball in Birmingham, in 2009 Corporate Realty Development brought forward a proposal to build a new stadium for the Barons adjacent to the Railroad Park. In April 2010, a privately funded, $40,000 feasibility study was commissioned, and in September, its findings were released. The study indicated the construction of a stadium could potentially result in over $500 million in direct and indirect spending in the city.

In October 2010, the Birmingham City Council approved an ordinance by a vote of 8–1 to increase the city's lodging tax by 3.5% to finance the construction of the stadium. At the time of its approval, the tax was expected to generate $5 million annually. Additionally, a provision in the ordinance called for a repeal of the tax by January 2012 if the Barons were unable to relocate or a primary tenant for the facility could not be found. On November 4, an agreement was reached between the City of Birmingham and Barons ownership to relocate the team as the primary tenant of the stadium upon its completion.

In July 2011, the location for the stadium was unveiled as being along First Avenue South, between 14th and 16th Streets South. The majority of the properties involved were acquired through a land swap with the University of Alabama at Birmingham (UAB), and the remaining were purchased from private landholders. In September, the building team for the stadium was released with 61% being minority-owned firms and most based in Birmingham.

The official groundbreaking ceremony was held for the estimated $60 million stadium on February 2, 2012. At that time, the name of the stadium as Regions Field was unveiled, with the naming rights purchased by Birmingham-based Regions Financial Corporation. On March 14, the Birmingham Design Review Committee approved the site plan for the facility to allow for its construction to commence upon completion of the on-site demolition. After just over one year of construction, Regions Field opened on April 10, 2013, for a sold-out game against the Mississippi Braves.

In 2013, the Barons and the University of Alabama at Birmingham (UAB) reached an agreement to allow for the Blazers baseball team to schedule as many games as would allow at Regions Field. As such, UAB scheduled 21 of their 30 home games for the 2014 season at Regions Field. In their first game played at Regions Field, the Blazers shutout UT–Martin 5–0.

== Design ==
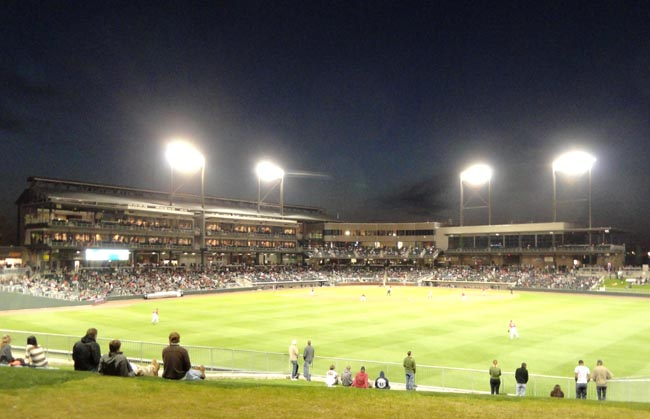
Perspective from beyond center field in April 2013.

The design team for the stadium included HKS, Inc. of Dallas and both Hoskins Architecture and GA Studio of Birmingham. The stadium facade utilizes brick and steel in an effort to both serve as homage to Birmingham's industrial past and to better blend with the surrounding neighborhood. Specifically, design elements inspired from Rickwood Field and Sloss Furnaces were utilized in its physical design. The main entrance is located at the corner of 14th Street South and First Avenue South, the main concourse is located at street level and the playing field is located 16 feet (4.9 m) below street grade.

The original layout of the stadium had center field located at the northern end of the facility with the backdrop being the skyline of downtown Birmingham. However, its orientation was changed in the final design with center field located at the eastern end of the facility with the backdrop being the downtown Birmingham skyline, UAB and the medical district and Red Mountain. The change was made as a result of Birmingham's irregular street grid that is oriented about 30° from magnetic north in order to meet guidelines set forth by Major League Baseball for stadium orientation as it relates to sun angle.

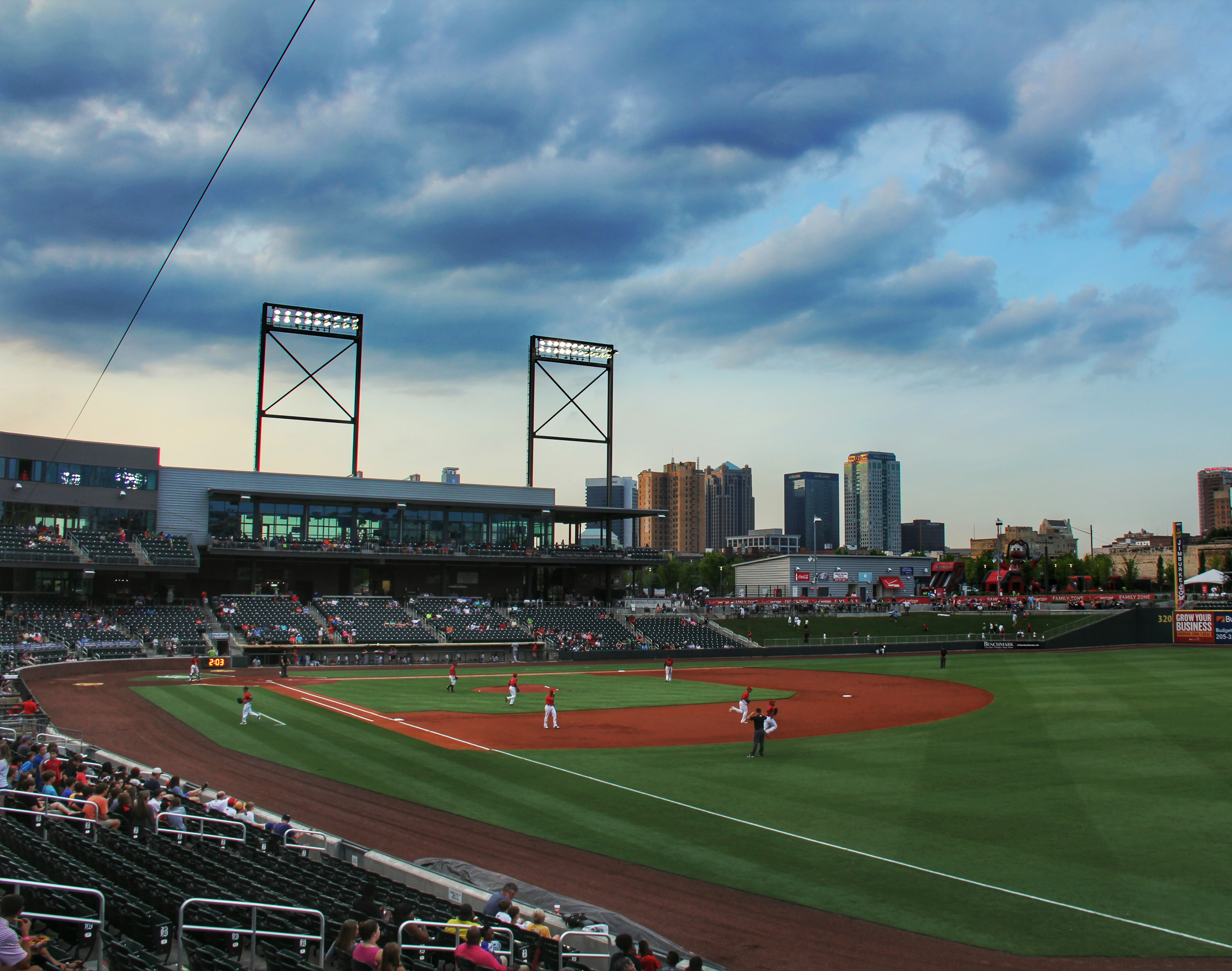
Looking towards the Birmingham skyline from Regions Field. July 15, 2015

As part of the overall design, 250 parking spaces are provided on-site as part of its grounds. However, in order to reach the 2,500 spaces necessary for the project as a whole, agreements were made to utilize existing parking garages owned by the Children's Hospital of Alabama, Jefferson County, Cooper Green Mercy Hospital and the University of Alabama at Birmingham, located within a 5–10 minute walk of the stadium. The Birmingham-Jefferson County Transit Authority also provides free bus service to and from the stadium and the Central Station located on Morris Avenue.

== Diagram ==
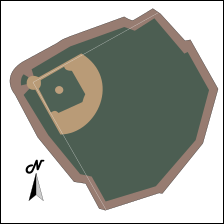
