= AT&T Field =

Baseball field in Chattanooga, Tennessee

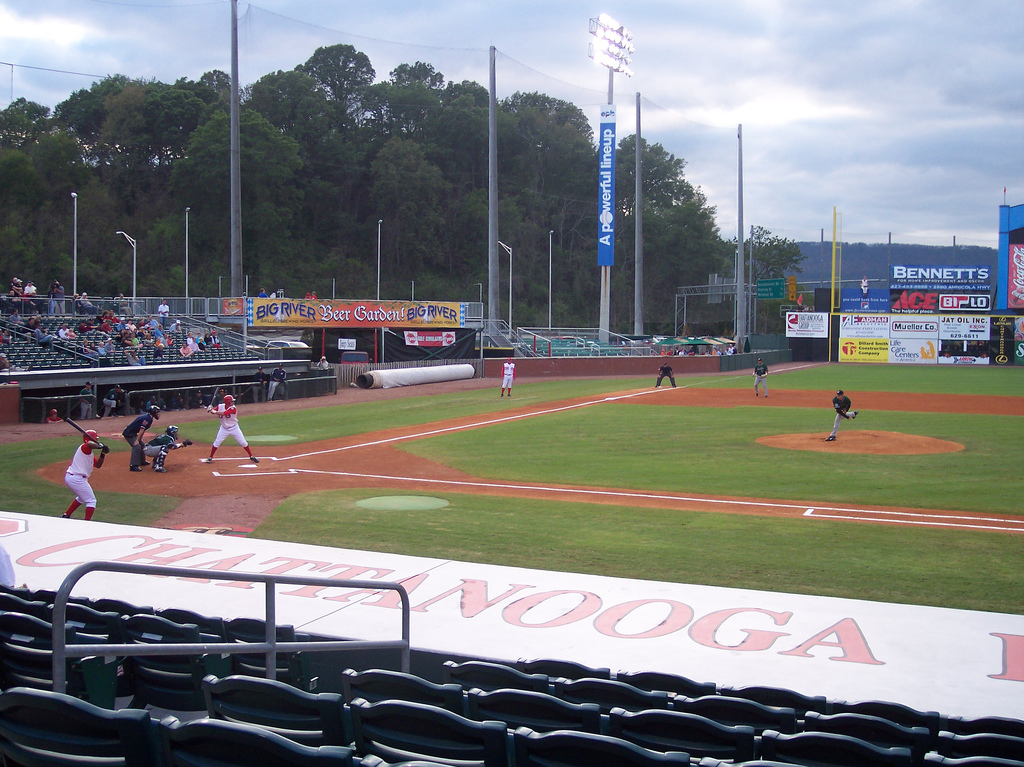

- Location within Tennessee Location within the United States
- Former names: Bellsouth Park (2000–2007)
- Location: 201 Power Alley; Chattanooga, TN 37402
- Coordinates: 35°3′16″N 85°18′50″W
- Owner: Engel Stadium Corporation
- Operator: Engel Stadium Corporation
- Capacity: 6,382
- Surface: Grass
- Field size: Left Field: 330 ft (100 m); Center Field: 400 ft (120 m); Right Field: 325 ft (99 m)

Construction
- Groundbreaking: May 3, 1999
- Built: 1999–2000
- Opened: April 10, 2000
- Closed: April 1, 2026
- Cost: $10.2 million ($19.1 million in 2025 dollars)
- Architect: DLR Group
- Structural engineers: March Adams & Associates, Inc.
- General contractor: EMJ Corp.

Tenant
- Chattanooga Lookouts (SL) (2000–2025)

AT&T Field was a baseball stadium located in Chattanooga, Tennessee. It was the home of the minor league Chattanooga Lookouts of the Southern League from 2000 to 2025.

The stadium had a capacity of 6,382, with the vast majority of seating located on the first base side. Construction of the stadium began in March 1999, and was completed for the 2000 season. The stadium's first game was on April 10, 2000, a 5–4 Chattanooga win.

AT&T Field was known as BellSouth Park until March 2007, when the ballpark's name was changed to reflect the purchase of BellSouth by AT&T Inc.

Following the conclusion of the 2025 season, the Lookouts moved to the newly-constructed Erlanger Park, two miles south. The Chattanooga Lookouts held their final regular-season game at AT&T Field on September 7, 2025. AT&T Field was demolished in 2026 and the site is to be redeveloped.

== Field diagram ==
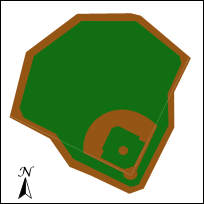
