= Trustmark Park =

Baseball stadium in Pearl, Mississippi

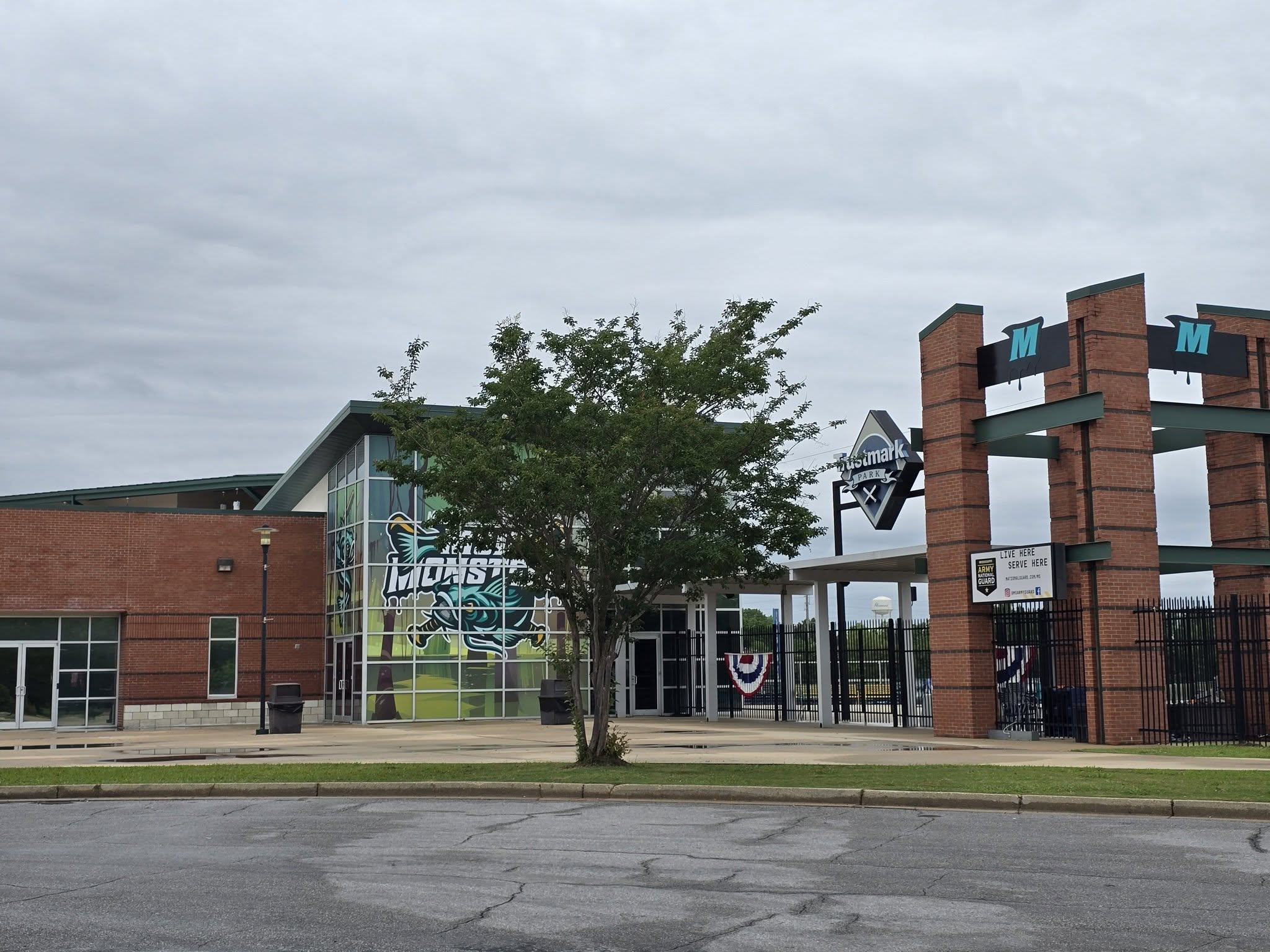
- Trustmark Park in 2026

- Location within Mississippi Location within the United States
- Interactive map of Trustmark Park
- Address: 1 Monsters Alley; Pearl, Mississippi 39208
- Coordinates: 32.27391°N 90.147969°W
- Owner: Spectrum Capital LLC
- Operator: Mississippi Mud Monsters
- Capacity: 8,480 total; 6,500 fixed seats
- Surface: Synthetic turf infield; natural grass outfield
- Record attendance: 8,638 (April 23, 2019)
- Field size: Left field: 335 feet (102 m); Center field: 402 feet (123 m); Right field: 332 feet (101 m)

Construction
- Groundbreaking: May 11, 2004
- Opened: April 18, 2005
- Cost: $28 million ($46.2 million in 2025 dollars)
- Architects: Dale and Associates Architects, P.A. (Pearl, MS); Populous (Kansas City, MO)
- Structural engineer: Structural Design Group
- Services engineer: I. C. Thomasson Associates
- General contractors: W.G. Yates & Sons

Tenants
- Mississippi Braves (SL) 2005–2024; Governor's Cup 2007–present Conference USA baseball tournament 2011–2012; Mississippi Mud Monsters (NAPB) 2025–present Belhaven Blazers (NCAA) 2025–present

Website
- mudmonstersbaseball.com

Trustmark Park is a baseball stadium in Pearl, Mississippi. It is the home of the Mississippi Mud Monsters of the National Association of Professional Baseball (NAPB), an MLB Partner League. The ballpark was previously the home of the Mississippi Braves, the Southern League Double-A affiliate of the Atlanta Braves, from 2005 to 2024. The venue also hosts college baseball events, including the annual Governor's Cup between Mississippi State and Ole Miss, and is a longtime championship venue for the Mississippi High School Activities Association (MHSAA). Trustmark Park has also been used for concerts, festivals, holiday attractions, and community events.

== History ==
=== Planning, relocation, and construction ===
Trustmark Park was developed as part of the relocation of the Greenville Braves, the Atlanta Braves' Double-A affiliate, from Greenville, South Carolina, to Pearl, Mississippi. A 2016 Bloomberg Businessweek article traced the origins of the project to 2003, when stadium developer and consultant Tim Bennett approached then-Pearl mayor Jimmy Foster about building a minor league baseball stadium in the city. Bennett did not initially have a team committed to the project, but later learned that Atlanta's Double-A affiliate in Greenville was nearing the end of its lease.

Bloomberg reported that Bennett, Foster, and John Schuerholz, then the Atlanta Braves' general manager, toured the proposed stadium site near Highway 80 in Pearl during the early stages of the discussions. Foster and Bennett later worked with Braves executive Mike Plant on a plan to bring the team and a nearby Bass Pro Shops development to Pearl, with the city issuing bonds to finance the project.

Trustmark Park broke ground on May 11, 2004, and opened on April 18, 2005. Construction crews worked two shifts, seven days a week on the new 5,500-seat stadium. The project was described in 2004 as a $20 million stadium, with Bloomfield Properties developing the property and W.G. Yates & Sons serving as general contractor. Planned amenities included corporate suites, dining and group activity areas, and children's play areas.

The ballpark derives its name from the sale of naming rights to Trustmark, a bank holding company headquartered in nearby Jackson, Mississippi.

=== Financing and development ===
The stadium was part of a broader public-financing and commercial-development plan in Pearl. Bloomberg Businessweek reported that Pearl raised $78 million through bonds for the stadium and surrounding development, with $28 million set aside for the ballpark. The article also reported that the city paid Bennett a finder's fee of more than $1 million.

According to Mississippi Today, state Rep. Ricky Cummings authored 2000 legislation that created a sales tax rebate program for tourism-related projects. Trustmark Park and the adjacent Bass Pro Shops development later received $18.9 million through the program, and Atlanta Braves officials cited the rebate program in 2004 as one of the primary reasons they chose Pearl.

The financing later drew criticism. Bloomberg reported that Pearl planned to repay the bonds through several revenue streams, including a ticket surcharge, sales tax from Bass Pro Shops, and a parking fee that was later replaced by a sales tax on a nearby shopping and restaurant district. The article also reported that Moody's Investors Service downgraded Pearl's debt rating in 2015, citing stadium-related liabilities.

=== Mississippi Braves era ===
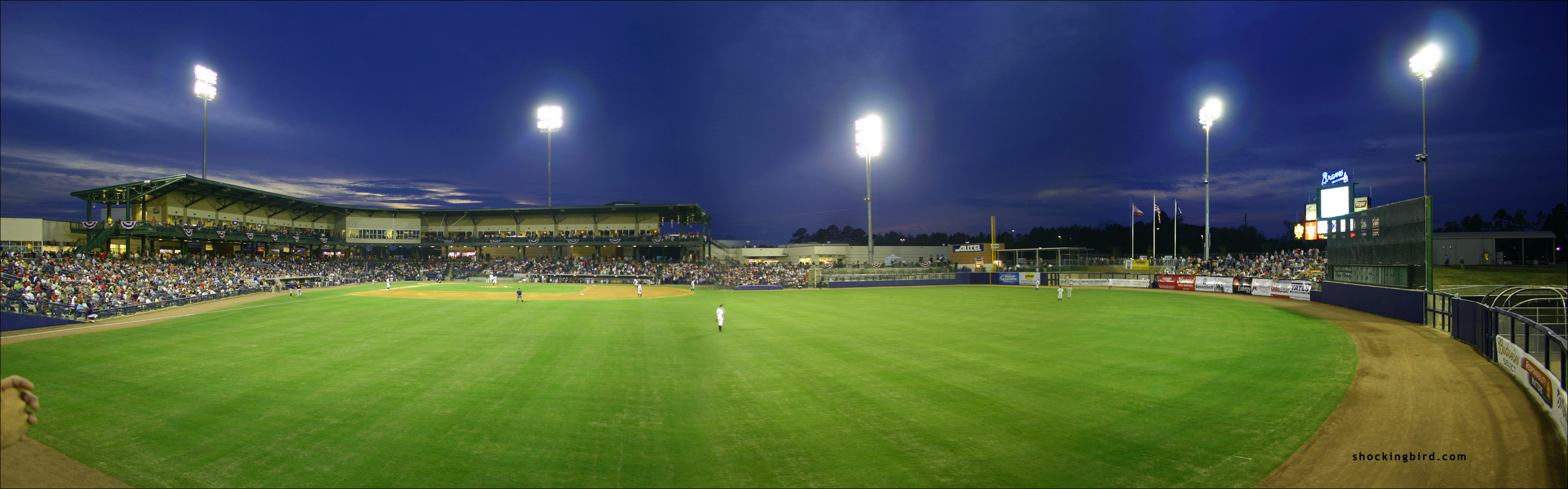
Panoramic view of Trustmark Park during its home opener in 2005

Trustmark Park opened as the home of the Mississippi Braves, who relocated from Greenville, South Carolina, before the 2005 season. The Braves played at the ballpark from 2005 through 2024 before relocating to Columbus, Georgia, where they became the Columbus Clingstones.

The stadium has 6,500 fixed seats and an overall capacity of 8,480.

The largest crowd to attend a game at the ballpark was 8,638 for the Mississippi Braves' 2019 home opener on April 23, 2019. The previous record was 8,542, set during the 2016 Governor's Cup, when Mississippi State defeated Ole Miss, 2–0.

In August 2019, the M-Braves welcomed their three millionth fan at Trustmark Park during a game against the Birmingham Barons. At the time, the team said that 146 M-Braves players had gone on to make their major league debuts since the club's arrival in Pearl.

=== Transition to MLB Partner League baseball ===
After the Mississippi Braves announced their relocation, the Frontier League awarded an expansion franchise to Pearl for the 2025 season. The new team became the Mississippi Mud Monsters, continuing professional baseball at Trustmark Park and beginning a new operating era for the ballpark after two decades as an affiliated Minor League Baseball venue.

=== Mud Monsters era and facility upgrades ===
The Mississippi Mud Monsters began play at Trustmark Park in 2025 as members of the Frontier League, an MLB Partner League. In January 2025, Belhaven University reached an agreement with the Mud Monsters for Trustmark Park to serve as the home of Belhaven Blazers baseball through 2030. Independent reporting described the arrangement as an agreement between Belhaven and the Mud Monsters to share the field, including potentially overlapping practice schedules. Under the partnership, Belhaven's NCAA Division III baseball team uses Trustmark Park for games, practices, and showcases.

In September 2025, the Mud Monsters announced that Trustmark Park would replace its natural-grass and dirt infield with more than 40,000 square feet of Major Play Matrix synthetic turf. The project was completed before the 2026 baseball season. The ballpark retained its natural-grass outfield while using synthetic turf throughout the infield.

The turf project followed several rainouts and field-condition issues at the ballpark, including an Ole Miss–Southern Miss game in 2023 that was cancelled during play because of infield sod conditions. Then-Mud Monsters general manager Andrew Seymour said the new infield would help reduce rain delays and make the venue more usable for concerts, showcases, and community events. The project was part of a broader effort to make Trustmark Park usable for more events beyond baseball, including concerts, showcases, festivals, and community gatherings.

== Features ==
Trustmark Park features a 360-degree concourse that allows spectators to walk around the playing field. The ballpark is built in a recessed bowl, with seating beginning at the main concourse level and moving downward toward the field.

The ballpark's exterior and interior design include red brick and exposed steel trusses. The field dimensions are 335 feet (102 m) down the left-field line, 402 feet (123 m) to center field, and 332 feet (101 m) down the right-field line.

The venue includes 22 luxury suites, a picnic pavilion in the left-field corner, and party deck areas on the suite level. The ballpark also includes the Farm Bureau Grill, a full-service restaurant beyond the right-field fence that overlooks the playing field. The ballpark also includes a merchandise store, a children's play area, and closed-circuit video monitors located throughout the stadium.

The ballpark was constructed with an underground drainage system designed to remove up to 10 inches (250 mm) of rain per hour.

== Notable events ==
=== College baseball ===
Trustmark Park hosted the Conference USA baseball tournament in 2011 and 2012. Rice won the 2011 tournament, and UAB won the 2012 tournament.

Trustmark Park hosted the 2026 HBCU Power Series presented by Major League Baseball from February 13 through February 15. Six Southwestern Athletic Conference programs—Texas Southern, Prairie View A&M, Alabama A&M, Grambling State, Jackson State, and Alcorn State—participated in nine games over three days. The event concluded with Alcorn State defeating Jackson State 8–7 in 10 innings in the final game of the series.

The venue annually hosts the Governor's Cup, a neutral-site baseball game between Mississippi State and Ole Miss. The neutral-site series began in 1980 as the Mayor's Trophy in Jackson and moved to Trustmark Park in Pearl after the ballpark opened. The game is separate from the teams' Southeastern Conference schedule and regularly draws large crowds. The 2026 Mississippi Farm Bureau Governor's Cup drew 8,223 fans and was announced as a sellout.

=== MHSAA baseball championships ===
Trustmark Park has been a regular championship venue for Mississippi High School Activities Association baseball since the ballpark's early years. In 2026, the overall state baseball championships were contested at Trustmark Park for the 15th consecutive season, with championship series in all seven MHSAA classifications.

One of the ballpark's earliest notable championship series came in 2008, when Ocean Springs faced Tupelo, a team that had been ranked No. 1 nationally during the season. All three games of the state championship series went to extra innings. Ocean Springs won Game 1, 5–4 in nine innings; Tupelo won Game 2 by the same score in eight innings; and Ocean Springs overcame a 4–0 deficit to win the deciding game 5–4 in eight innings, earning the program's first state championship since 1982.

Petal won the 2010 Class 6A championship at Trustmark Park after defeating Madison Central 15–7 in the deciding game of a three-game series. The Petal teams of that era included future Major League Baseball player Anthony Alford, who helped the Panthers win consecutive state championships in 2010 and 2011.

DeSoto Central won its first Class 6A state championship at Trustmark Park in 2015. The team included future Atlanta Braves third baseman Austin Riley and pitcher Dallas Woolfolk. Riley was selected by Atlanta shortly after the championship and later reached the major leagues. On May 15, 2019, as DeSoto Central prepared to play another state championship series at Trustmark Park, Riley informed his former coach that he had been promoted to the Braves and would make his Major League debut that night.

DeSoto Central returned to win consecutive Class 6A championships in 2018 and 2019. Kyle Booker played on both championship teams. Woolfolk, a member of the 2015 champions, and Booker later returned to Trustmark Park as professional teammates with the Mississippi Mud Monsters in 2026. Former DeSoto Central head coach Mark Monaghan described the venue as "Omaha for Mississippi high school baseball."

The championships have also been the site of first titles and the end of long championship droughts. Pearl River Central defeated two-time defending champion Oxford 7–3 in 2017 to win the first baseball state championship in school history. In 2021, Saltillo recovered from a 12–1 loss to Pascagoula in Game 1 of the Class 5A championship series, won the next two games, and captured its first state baseball championship since 1972.

Several championship teams at Trustmark Park have also received national recognition. Oxford finished 35–1 in 2015, won the Class 5A championship, and finished No. 1 in the MaxPreps national computer rankings. Madison Central won the 2021 Class 6A championship and finished 34–2 before being named Baseball America's High School Team of the Year. The team included Braden Montgomery and Hunter Hines. Montgomery was later selected 12th overall in the 2024 Major League Baseball draft and reached the major leagues in 2026.

West Lauderdale defeated Sumrall in 2021 to win the program's state-record 15th baseball championship. Sumrall returned the following season and finished 33–1 while sweeping Pontotoc for the 2022 Class 4A championship, the program's sixth state title. At the time, Sumrall was ranked No. 2 nationally by Baseball America.

In 2023, both of Purvis' victories over West Lauderdale in the Class 4A championship series required extra innings. Purvis won Game 1, 3–1 in eight innings, then captured the championship with a 3–2, 10-inning victory on a walk-off sacrifice fly by JoJo Parker. It was Purvis' first state championship since 2012.

The 2024 championships included several historically significant results. Brandon returned to the state championship series for the first time since 1967 and swept Hernando to win the inaugural Class 7A title, clinching the championship with a 1–0 victory at Trustmark Park. George County swept Warren Central in the Class 6A championship series to win its first title since 1997. Vancleave lost the opening game of the Class 5A championship series to Lafayette 8–7 in 12 innings before winning Games 2 and 3 to capture its second state championship in six years.

The 2024 Class 4A series between Sumrall and Ripley featured a notable individual pitching performance by Ripley's Ty Long. Long struck out 18 batters in a complete-game, three-hit shutout in Game 1. Across 13 innings in the three-game series, Long struck out 27 batters, allowed four hits and did not allow an earned run, but Sumrall recovered to win the series and its seventh state championship.

The championship tradition continued into the Mud Monsters era. In Game 1 of the 2026 Class 2A championship series, Mize pitcher Holder McAlpin threw a complete-game no-hitter with nine strikeouts in a 3–0 victory over East Webster. Mize completed the sweep the following day to earn its first state championship since 2003. Petal also returned to Trustmark Park in 2026 for its first state championship appearance since 2011 and swept Oxford to win the Class 7A championship, the seventh baseball state title in program history.

=== Community impact ===
Trustmark Park has also been the setting for community and personal milestones. In a 2024 MLB.com story, David Kerr, then the Mississippi Braves' director of group sales, described a guiding idea for working in Minor League Baseball: "Every game is someone's first."

The article centered on Anna Leah Jolly, then Miss Rankin County and a Miss Mississippi candidate, who threw out a ceremonial first pitch at the M-Braves' 2024 home opener. Jolly had first visited Trustmark Park in 2013 as part of a group of children from Ukraine participating in the Joyful Journeys international hosting program. During that game, she met Kelly and Jay Jolly, who later became her adoptive parents.

=== Community and non-baseball events ===
Trustmark Park has regularly served as a venue for charitable fundraisers, community gatherings, festivals, and other events in addition to baseball.

One of the ballpark's largest recurring community events is Touch A Truck Jackson, a Junior League of Jackson fundraiser held annually at Trustmark Park. The family-oriented event brings emergency vehicles, construction equipment, heavy machinery, service vehicles, and interactive exhibits to the ballpark, allowing children to climb into and explore the equipment. Its Field Trip Friday program provides school groups with free access, while other programming has included literacy and STEM activities and sensory-friendly sessions.

Touch A Truck has repeatedly drawn thousands of visitors to Trustmark Park. The 2017 event featured 83 vehicles and 47 exhibitors, with approximately 2,000 students attending Field Trip Friday and more than 5,000 general-admission attendees; the event raised more than $67,000 for the Junior League's community work. In 2019, more than 7,200 people attended over two days and the event raised more than $66,000. More than 6,000 guests attended when the in-person event returned in 2022, and nearly 7,000 attended its 10th-anniversary event in 2023. In 2026, more than 1,000 Jackson Public Schools students attended Field Trip Friday, and proceeds supported Junior League community projects throughout the Jackson metropolitan area.

The ballpark has also hosted a series of charity walks and races. The Susan G. Komen Race for the Cure was held at Trustmark Park in 2010, with proceeds supporting breast-cancer education and research. In 2014, Trustmark Park hosted the Jackson Walk to Defeat ALS. The Mississippi Braves served as presenting sponsor, then-general manager Steve DeSalvo chaired the walk, and the stadium hosted additional fundraising and awareness events for the ALS Association that weekend. The National Multiple Sclerosis Society held Walk MS: Jackson at Trustmark Park in 2023, with accessible one-mile and three-mile routes beginning at the venue.

The American Cancer Society's Making Strides Against Breast Cancer walk has also been held repeatedly at Trustmark Park. The event was held at the ballpark in 2022 and 2023 and returned in 2024 and 2025.

The Center for Pregnancy Choices has used Trustmark Park for its annual LifeWalk fundraiser. Organizers said the 2024 event, the organization's largest annual fundraiser, brought together more than 800 supporters. LifeWalk returned to the ballpark in April 2026, with hundreds expected to participate.

Other charitable events have included Stewpot Community Services' annual Red Beans and Rice Celebration. By 2010, the Trustmark Park event featured more than 35 cooking teams and regularly drew more than 1,000 attendees, with proceeds supporting Stewpot's work in the Jackson metropolitan area.

During the canceled 2020 Minor League Baseball season, the ballpark hosted alternative events, including target golf. The event featured a nine-hole target course with elevated tee boxes on a platform beneath the stadium's scoreboard.

In 2025, the ballpark hosted Main Street Pearl's Oktoberfest during the day and MonstoBEERfest, a ticketed beer festival, that evening. Later that year, Trustmark Park hosted The Southern Lights, a walk-through holiday attraction featuring more than 2.5 million lights, real-ice skating, fire pits, and train rides. The Southern Lights was also reported by WJTV as a holiday lights attraction at Trustmark Park in Pearl.
