= Mississippi Braves =

Former Minor League Baseball team based in Pearl, Mississippi

- 2005–2024; Pearl, Mississippi

Team logo	Cap insignia

Minor league affiliations
- Class: Double-A (2005–2024)
- League: Southern League (2005–2024)
- Division: South Division

Major league affiliations
- Team: Atlanta Braves (2005–2024)

Minor league titles
- League titles (2): 2008; 2021
- Division titles (3): 2008; 2016; 2021
- First-half titles (1): 2007
- Second-half titles (1): 2008

Team data
- Name: Mississippi Braves (2005–2024)
- Colors: Navy, scarlet, white, gold
- Ballpark: Trustmark Park

The Mississippi Braves, or M-Braves as they were referred to locally, were a Minor League Baseball team based in Pearl, Mississippi, a suburb of Jackson, from 2005 to 2024. They were the Double-A affiliate of the Atlanta Braves and competed in the Southern League. The M-Braves played their home games at Trustmark Park. After the 2024 season, the team relocated to Columbus, Georgia, to become the Columbus Clingstones.

== History ==
=== Relocation from Greenville and construction of Trustmark Park ===
The franchise that became the Mississippi Braves previously played as the Greenville Braves in Greenville, South Carolina. The club relocated to Pearl, Mississippi, before the 2005 season after an agreement was reached for a new stadium in Mississippi.

A 2016 Bloomberg Businessweek article traced the origins of the move to 2003, when stadium developer and consultant Tim Bennett approached Pearl mayor Jimmy Foster about the possibility of building a minor league baseball stadium in the city. Bennett did not initially have a team committed to the project, but later learned that the Atlanta Braves' Double-A affiliate in Greenville, South Carolina, was nearing the end of its lease. In December 2003, Bennett persuaded Braves officials to let him pitch Pearl as a potential new home for the club.

Bloomberg reported that Bennett, Foster, and John Schuerholz, then the Atlanta Braves' general manager, toured the proposed stadium site near Highway 80 in Pearl during the early stages of the discussions. Foster and Bennett later worked with Braves executive Mike Plant on a plan to bring the team and a nearby Bass Pro Shops development to Pearl, with the city issuing bonds to finance the project. Greenville officials were also negotiating with the Braves during this period, but the club announced on April 1, 2004, that the 2004 season would be its last in South Carolina.

Construction crews worked two shifts, seven days a week on a new 5,500-seat stadium in Pearl. The project was described in 2004 as a $20 million stadium, with Bloomfield Properties developing the property and Yates Construction serving as general contractor. Planned amenities included corporate suites, dining and group activity areas, and children's play areas. Site clearing began in July 2004, and the ballpark was scheduled to be completed by March 1, 2005.

The Braves opened both their Mississippi era and Trustmark Park on April 18, 2005, against the Montgomery Biscuits. The team's first season in Pearl ended with a 64-68 record and a fourth-place finish in the Southern League's South Division.

=== Financing and economic debate ===
The Mississippi Braves' relocation to Pearl was tied to public financing and economic development efforts. According to Mississippi Today, state Rep. Ricky Cummings authored legislation in 2000 that created a sales tax rebate program for tourism-related projects. Trustmark Park and the adjacent Bass Pro Shops development later received $18.9 million through the program, and Atlanta Braves officials cited the rebate program in 2004 as one of the primary reasons they chose Pearl.

Bloomberg reported that Pearl raised $78 million through bonds for the stadium and surrounding development, with $28 million set aside for the ballpark, and that the city paid Bennett a finder's fee of more than $1 million. The financing later drew criticism. Bloomberg reported that Pearl planned to repay the bonds through several revenue streams, including a ticket surcharge, sales tax from Bass Pro Shops, and a parking fee that was later replaced by a sales tax on a nearby shopping and restaurant district. The article also reported that Moody's Investors Service downgraded Pearl's debt rating in 2015, citing stadium-related liabilities.

=== Early years and first championship ===
The M-Braves reached the postseason for the first time in 2007 after winning the first half in the South Division, but lost to the Montgomery Biscuits in the divisional round.

In 2008, Mississippi won the second-half South Division title, then defeated the Birmingham Barons, 3-0, in the division series. The Braves went on to defeat the Carolina Mudcats, 3-2, in the Southern League Championship Series. Mississippi clinched the title on September 13, 2008, with a 3-2 victory in 10 innings in the decisive Game 5 at Trustmark Park. It was the franchise's first championship in Mississippi and the first Southern League title for Atlanta's Double-A affiliate since 1997.

=== Player development and Atlanta Braves affiliation ===
Throughout their 20 seasons in Mississippi, the M-Braves served as the Atlanta Braves' Double-A affiliate and were a key stop for many future major league players. Notable alumni included Brian McCann, Jeff Francoeur, Martin Prado, Freddie Freeman, Craig Kimbrel, Andrelton Simmons, Ronald Acuña Jr., Max Fried, and Michael Harris II. Several Atlanta players also appeared in Pearl on injury rehabilitation assignments, including Chipper Jones.

By August 2019, 146 former M-Braves had reached the major leagues. In January 2024, Mississippi Today reported that 169 former Mississippi Braves had advanced to Major League Baseball during the team's time in Pearl.

In January 2020, the M-Braves announced an all-decade team for the 2010s, with selections based on production in Mississippi and later major league success.

=== Canceled 2020 season ===
The 2020 Minor League Baseball season was canceled because of the COVID-19 pandemic. During the year without M-Braves games, Trustmark Park hosted alternative events, including a Father's Day batting practice event, movie nights, and a target golf event in which participants hit shots from beneath the center-field videoboard to targets placed on the field.

=== Minor League Baseball restructuring and 2021 championship ===
In conjunction with Major League Baseball's restructuring of Minor League Baseball in 2021, the Braves were organized into the Double-A South. They finished the regular season with a 67-44 record, the best record in the league, and qualified for the playoffs.

Mississippi defeated the Montgomery Biscuits, 3-2, in the best-of-five championship series to win the Double-A South title. Shea Langeliers was selected as the league's Top MLB Prospect, and Dan Meyer was named Manager of the Year.

In 2022, the Double-A South resumed use of the Southern League name, which had been used by the regional circuit prior to the 2021 reorganization.

=== Diamond Baseball Holdings ownership ===
In December 2021, Diamond Baseball Holdings purchased the Mississippi Braves from Atlanta Braves owner Liberty Media, along with Atlanta's affiliates in Gwinnett and Rome.

=== Community legacy ===
The M-Braves' time in Pearl included community and personal milestones tied to Trustmark Park. In a 2024 MLB.com story, David Kerr, then the team's director of group sales, described a guiding idea for working in Minor League Baseball: "Every game is someone's first."

The story centered on Anna Leah Jolly, then Miss Rankin County and a Miss Mississippi candidate, who threw out a ceremonial first pitch during the M-Braves' 2024 home opener. Jolly had first visited Trustmark Park in 2013 as part of a group of children from Ukraine participating in the Joyful Journeys international hosting program. During that game, she met Kelly and Jay Jolly, who later became her adoptive parents. Kerr later described the team's final season as "a love letter back to Mississippi."

=== Final seasons and relocation to Columbus ===
In January 2024, the Braves announced that the 2024 season would be their final season in Mississippi and that the team would relocate to Columbus, Georgia, for the 2025 season. Mississippi Today noted that the relocation came after the Braves had completed the 20-year commitment to Pearl described when the team moved from Greenville in 2004. The outlet also reported that Trustmark Park had 22 suites, cost $28 million to build, and was tied to a 20-year lease.

Pearl Mayor Jake Windham said city, county, and state officials had tried to keep the Braves at Trustmark Park and said efforts would be made to bring another minor league franchise to the ballpark. The relocated club was later named the Columbus Clingstones.

The M-Braves finished their final season in Pearl with a 63-73 record. Their departure left the Biloxi Shuckers, the Milwaukee Brewers' Double-A affiliate, as Mississippi's only affiliated Minor League Baseball club. Professional baseball continued at Trustmark Park in 2025 with the debut of the Mississippi Mud Monsters of the Frontier League.

== Ballpark ==
The Mississippi Braves played all 20 seasons at Trustmark Park in Pearl, Mississippi. The ballpark opened in 2005 and was described by MLB.com as the place "where the Braves of tomorrow start to picture life in Atlanta." The ballpark was built as the centerpiece of the team's relocation from Greenville, South Carolina, to Pearl.

In August 2019, the M-Braves welcomed their three millionth fan at Trustmark Park during a game against the Birmingham Barons. At the time, the team said that 146 M-Braves players had gone on to make their major league debuts since the club's arrival in Pearl.

After the Braves relocated to Columbus, Georgia, the ballpark remained in professional baseball use as the home of the Mississippi Mud Monsters, a Frontier League expansion team that began play in 2025.

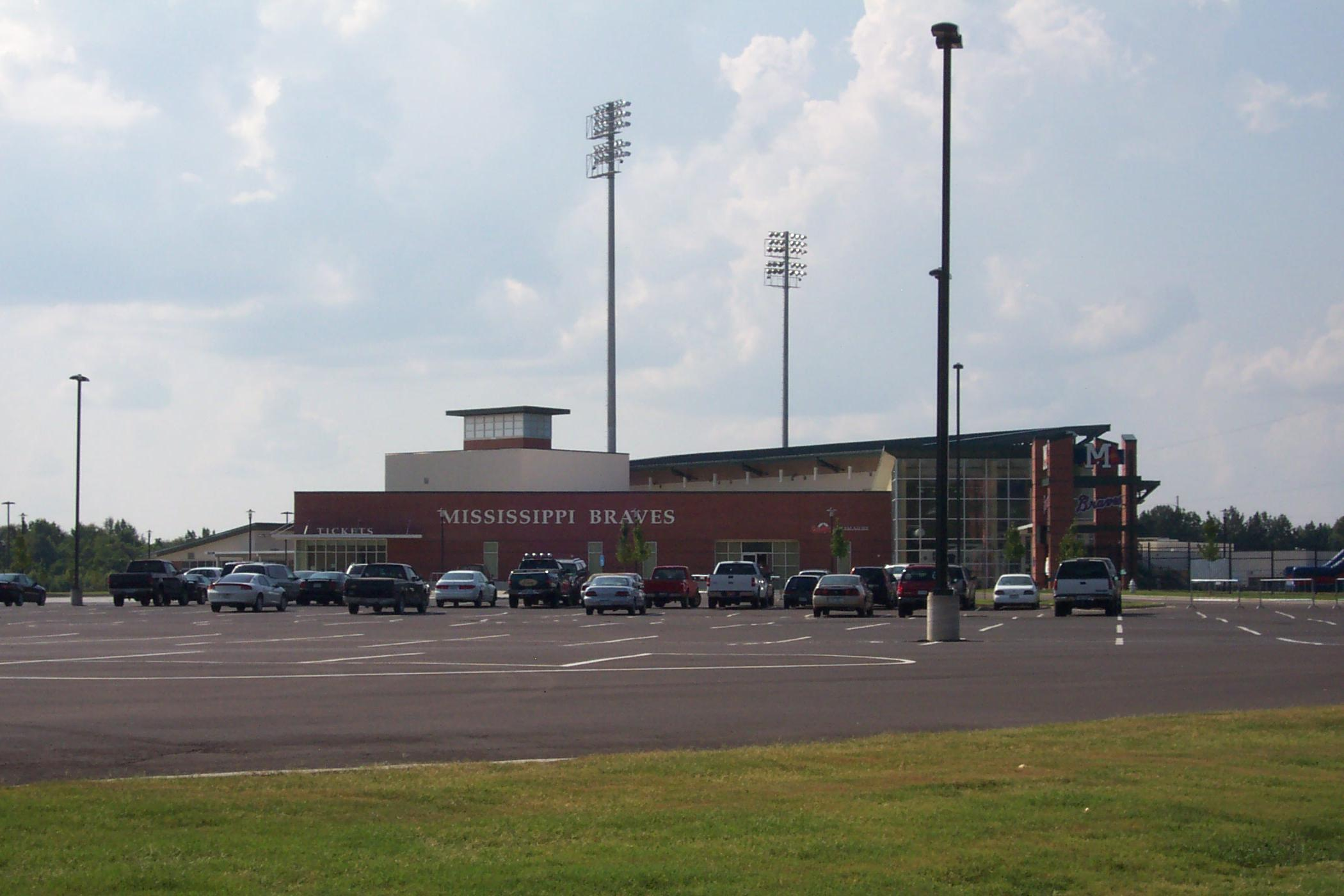
M-Braves former home, Trustmark Park

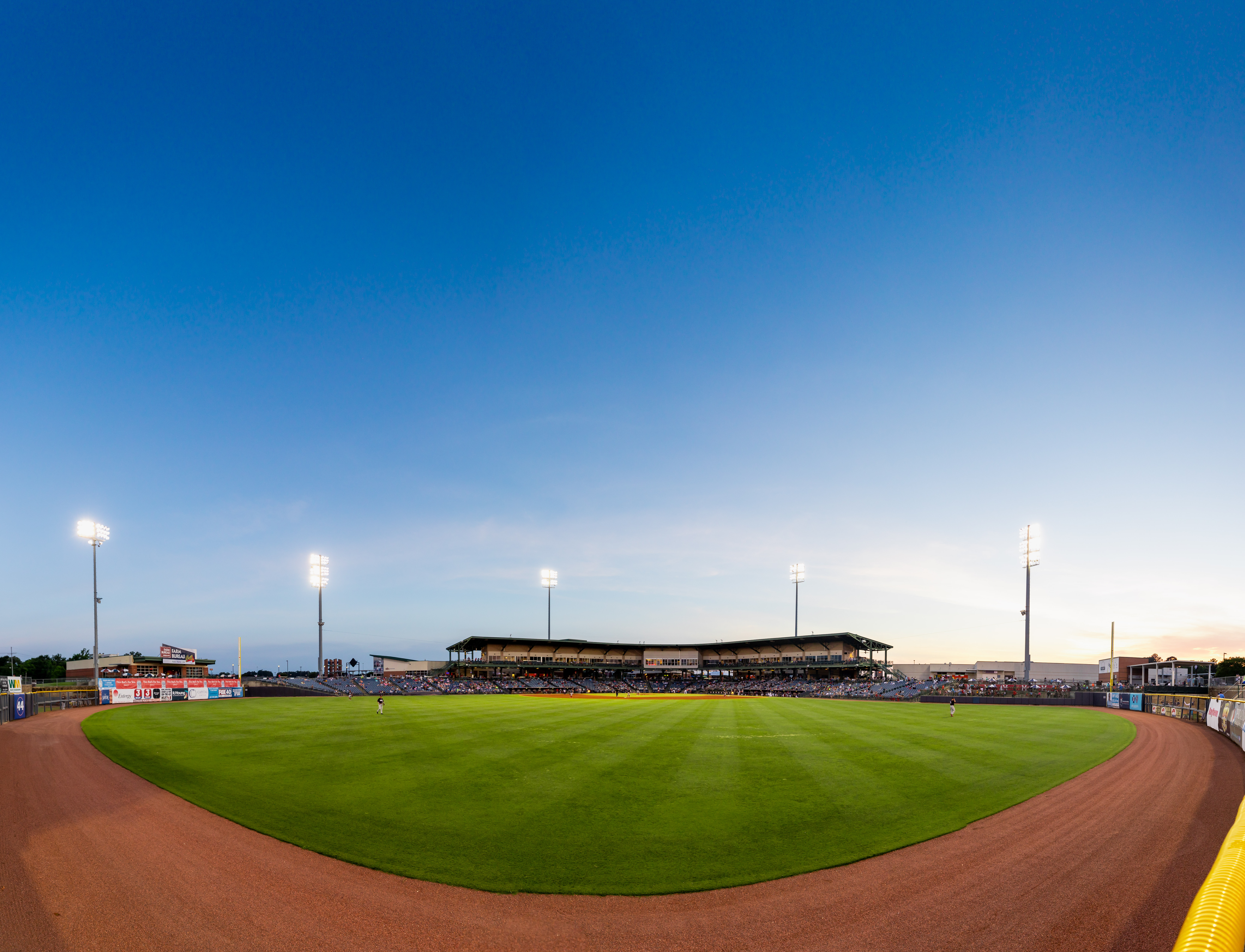
Trustmark Park, home of the Mississippi Braves

== Season-by-season records ==
Season	League	Record	Win %	Finish	Playoffs
2005	Southern League	64-68	.485	4th, South Division	Did not qualify
2006	Southern League	58-80	.420	5th, South Division	Did not qualify
2007	Southern League	67-72	.482	4th, South Division	Lost division series
2008	Southern League	73-66	.525	2nd, South Division	Won Southern League championship
2009	Southern League	65-73	.471	4th, South Division	Did not qualify
2010	Southern League	63-74	.460	4th, South Division	Did not qualify
2011	Southern League	61-79	.436	5th, South Division	Did not qualify
2012	Southern League	62-77	.446	5th, South Division	Did not qualify
2013	Southern League	76-63	.547	2nd, South Division	Lost division series
2014	Southern League	83-56	.597	1st, South Division	Did not qualify
2015	Southern League	68-67	.504	3rd, South Division	Did not qualify
2016	Southern League	73-65	.529	2nd, South Division	Lost championship series
2017	Southern League	58-80	.420	5th, South Division	Did not qualify
2018	Southern League	67-71	.486	3rd, South Division	Did not qualify
2019	Southern League	64-75	.460	4th, South Division	Did not qualify
2020	Southern League	Season canceled due to the COVID-19 pandemic			
2021	Double-A South	67-44	.604	1st, South Division	Won Double-A South championship
2022	Southern League	62-74	.456	4th, South Division	Did not qualify
2023	Southern League	62-75	.453	4th, South Division	Did not qualify
2024	Southern League	63-73	.463	4th, South Division	Did not qualify

== Notable players ==
The Mississippi Braves produced numerous future major league players during their 20 seasons in Pearl. By August 2019, 146 former M-Braves had reached Major League Baseball. By January 2024, that number had grown to 169.

Several prominent Atlanta Braves of the 2010s and 2020s played for Mississippi, including Freddie Freeman, Ronald Acuña Jr., Ozzie Albies, Austin Riley, Dansby Swanson, Michael Harris II, Spencer Strider, and Max Fried. After Atlanta won the 2021 World Series, Swanson referenced his time in Mississippi during a postgame interview, saying, "Those 100 degree days in Jackson, Mississippi were well worth it."

An asterisk (*) indicates a player who was promoted directly from Mississippi to the Atlanta Braves.

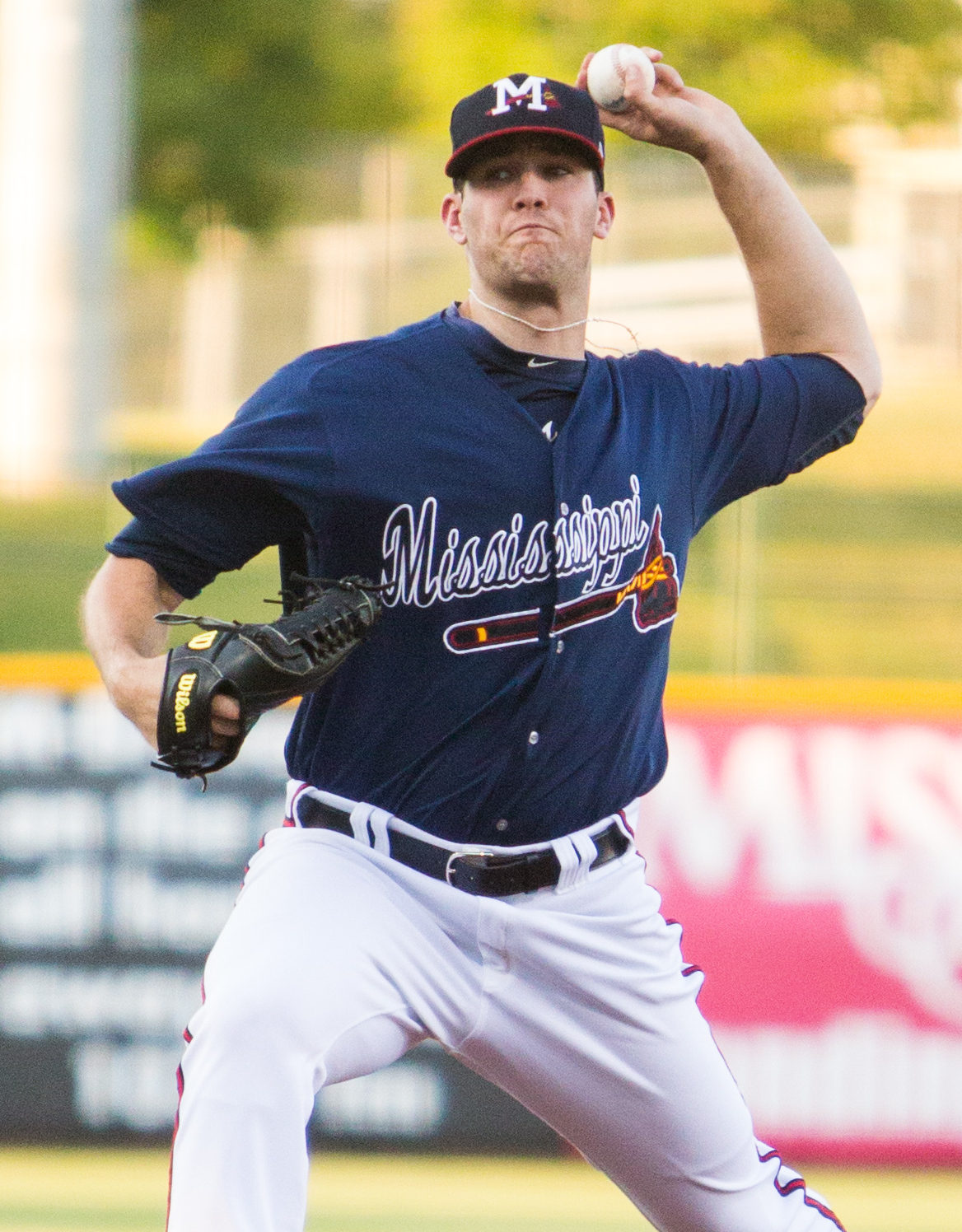
Alex Wood pitching for the Mississippi Braves

=== Position players ===
- Ronald Acuña Jr. (2017)
- Ozzie Albies (2016)
- Drake Baldwin (2023-2024)
- José Ascanio* (2006-2007)
- Christian Bethancourt (2012-2013)
- Gregor Blanco (2005-2006)
- William Contreras (2019)
- Travis Demeritte (2017-2018)
- Yunel Escobar (2006)
- Freddie Freeman (2009)
- Jeff Francoeur* (2005, 2008)
- Evan Gattis (2012)
- Philip Gosselin (2012-2013)
- Michael Harris II (2022)
- Jason Heyward (2009)
- Tommy La Stella (2013)
- Shea Langeliers (2021)
- Brian McCann* (2005)
- Nate McLouth* (2009)
- Cristian Pache (2018)
- Martín Prado* (2005-2006)
- Austin Riley (2017-2018)
- Jarrod Saltalamacchia* (2006-2007)
- Jordan Schafer (2008, 2010)
- Andrelton Simmons* (2012)
- Mallex Smith (2015)
- Dansby Swanson* (2016)
- Drew Waters (2019)

=== Pitchers ===
- Manny Acosta (2006)
- Kolby Allard (2017)
- Ian Anderson (2019)
- Blaine Boyer* (2005)
- Danny Burawa
- Román Colón (2005)
- Tucker Davidson (2018-2019)
- Joey Devine* (2005-2007)
- Bryce Elder (2021)
- David Fletcher (2024)
- Max Fried* (2017)
- Tommy Hanson (2008)
- Matt Harrison (2006)
- Chuck James (2005)
- Craig Kimbrel (2009)
- Kris Medlen (2007-2008)
- A. J. Minter (2016)
- Mike Minor (2010, 2014)
- Kyle Muller (2019, 2021)
- Sean Newcomb (2016)
- Brian O'Connor (2005)
- Jay Powell* (2005)
- Lucas Sims (2015-2016)
- Mike Soroka (2017)
- Spencer Strider (2021)
- A. J. Smith-Shawver (2023)
- Spencer Schwellenbach* (2024)
- Julio Teherán (2010)
- Touki Toussaint (2018)
- Arodys Vizcaíno (2011, 2015)
- Hurston Waldrep (2023-2024)
- Alex Wood* (2013)
- Kyle Wright (2018)

=== Rehabilitation assignments ===
- Chipper Jones (2006)
- Matt Diaz (2008)

=== Selected awards and honors ===
Year	Person	Honor	Notes
2018	Ronald Acuña Jr.	National League Rookie of the Year	Acuña won the BBWAA Jackie Robinson Rookie of the Year Award after playing for Mississippi in 2017.
2019	Drew Waters	Southern League Most Valuable Player	Waters became the first Mississippi Braves player to win the Southern League MVP award.
2020	Freddie Freeman	National League Most Valuable Player	Freeman became the first Mississippi Braves alumnus to win a major league MVP award.
2021	Shea Langeliers	Double-A South Top MLB Prospect	Langeliers received the league's Top MLB Prospect honor after Mississippi's championship season.
2021	Dan Meyer	Double-A South Manager of the Year	Meyer led Mississippi to the Double-A South championship.
2022	Michael Harris II	National League Rookie of the Year	Harris won the BBWAA Jackie Robinson Rookie of the Year Award after playing for Mississippi earlier that season.
2025	Drake Baldwin	National League Rookie of the Year	Baldwin won the BBWAA Jackie Robinson Rookie of the Year Award after playing for Mississippi in 2023 and 2024.
