= 1998 American League Championship Series =

29th edition of Major League Baseball's American League Championship Series

Team (Wins)	Managers	Season
New York Yankees (4)	Joe Torre	114–48 (.704), GA: 22
Cleveland Indians (2)	Mike Hargrove	89–73 (.549), GA: 9
- Dates: October 6–13
- MVP: David Wells (New York)
- Umpires: Jim Evans, Ted Hendry, John Shulock, Larry Young, Tim Welke, Jim McKean

Broadcast
- Television: NBC (United States); MLB International (International)
- TV announcers: Bob Costas and Joe Morgan (NBC); Gary Thorne and Ken Singleton (MLB International)
- Radio: ESPN
- Radio announcers: Dan Shulman and Buck Martinez
- ALDS: New York Yankees over Texas Rangers (3–0); Cleveland Indians over Boston Red Sox (3–1)

The 1998 American League Championship Series (ALCS) was a best-of-seven playoff series in Major League Baseball's 1998 postseason pitting the overall #1 seeded New York Yankees and the defending American League champion and second-seeded Cleveland Indians for the American League pennant. The Series began on October 6 and ended on October 19. The Yankees held home field advantage, which for the first time was determined by virtue of having a better regular season record.

This was the second postseason meeting between the Yankees and Indians, with Cleveland winning in only prior meeting in last year's ALDS in five games.

The Yankees defeated the Indians four games to two. Having lost to the Indians in the ALDS the previous year, this marked the second consecutive year in which the winner of the ALCS defeated the same team who eliminated them the previous year in the ALDS.

The Yankees went on to sweep the National League champion San Diego Padres in the 1998 World Series to win their 24th World Series championship. New York, who won 114 games during the regular season, recorded their only two losses of the 1998 postseason in this series.

== Summary ==
=== New York Yankees vs. Cleveland Indians ===
New York won the series, 4–2.

Game	Date	Score	Location	Time	Attendance
1	October 6	Cleveland Indians – 2, New York Yankees – 7	Yankee Stadium (I)	3:31	57,138
2	October 7	Cleveland Indians – 4, New York Yankees – 1 (12)	Yankee Stadium (I)	4:28	57,128
3	October 9	New York Yankees – 1, Cleveland Indians – 6	Jacobs Field	2:53	44,904
4	October 10	New York Yankees – 4, Cleveland Indians – 0	Jacobs Field	3:31	44,981
5	October 11	New York Yankees – 5, Cleveland Indians – 3	Jacobs Field	3:33	44,966
6	October 13	Cleveland Indians – 5, New York Yankees – 9	Yankee Stadium (I)	3:31	57,142

== Game summaries ==
=== Game 1 ===
October 6, 1998 8:07 pm (EDT) at Yankee Stadium (I) in Bronx, New York 54 °F (12 °C), clear
Team	1	2	3	4	5	6	7	8	9	R	H	E
Cleveland	0	0	0	0	0	0	0	0	2	2	5	0
New York	5	0	0	0	0	1	1	0	X	7	11	0
WP: David Wells (1–0) LP: Jaret Wright (0–1); Home runs: CLE: Manny Ramírez (1); NYY: Jorge Posada (1); Attendance: 57,138; Boxscore

Cleveland came in as heavy underdogs, but also were the defending American League Champions. In Game 1, the Yankees got off to a good start, by hitting four straight singles in the bottom of the first to score two runs. A groundout and stolen base then put runners on second and third with two outs before a wild pitch to Shane Spencer scored another run. Spencer walked before Jorge Posada's RBI single made it 4–0 Yankees and knocked starter Jaret Wright out of the game. Chad Ogea came on in relief and allowed an RBI single to Scott Brosius. Posada's leadoff home run in the sixth off Ogea made it 6–0, then next inning, back-to-back leadoff doubles by Paul O'Neill and Bernie Williams made it 7–0. Eventual ALCS MVP David Wells cruised through 8 1/3 innings. A two-run homer by Manny Ramírez would knock home the only runs of the game for Cleveland in the ninth. Jeff Nelson retired the last two batters of the game.

=== Game 2 ===
October 7, 1998 4:07 pm (EDT) at Yankee Stadium (I) in Bronx, New York 60 °F (16 °C), overcast
Team	1	2	3	4	5	6	7	8	9	10	11	12	R	H	E
Cleveland	0	0	0	1	0	0	0	0	0	0	0	3	4	8	1
New York	0	0	0	0	0	0	1	0	0	0	0	0	1	7	1
WP: Dave Burba (1–0) LP: Jeff Nelson (0–1) Sv: Mike Jackson (1); Home runs: CLE: David Justice (1); NYY: None; Attendance: 57,128; Boxscore

In Game 2, 20-game winner David Cone went for the Yankees, who looked like they would go to Cleveland up two games in the series. However, David Justice hit a home run in the fourth, putting the Yankees behind for the first time in the postseason. A Scott Brosius double with two on off Charles Nagy tied the game in the seventh, but the Yankees would squander the chance to score him. They would also squander many chances in the game to score, as the game moved to extra innings. Jim Thome led off the top of the 12th with a single. Enrique Wilson was then called on to pinch run. Travis Fryman then laid down a sacrifice bunt, and as Jeff Nelson went to throw it to first, he hit Fryman and the ball rolled past Chuck Knoblauch covering. Knoblauch tried to argue the call as the ball continued to roll past third base. Wilson and Fryman continued to run and Wilson would score and Fryman advanced to third as the ball was still not dead. The play would eventually be ruled an error by Tino Martinez. The Indians now had the lead back and loaded the bases with one out when Nelson hit Sandy Alomar Jr. with a pitch and walked Joey Cora. Graeme Lloyd relieved Nelson and allowed a two-run single to Kenny Lofton. Indians reliever Dave Burba earned the win, while Mike Jackson shutout the Yankees in the bottom of the inning for the save as the Indians tied the series 1–1.

=== Game 3 ===
October 9, 1998 8:07 pm (EDT) at Jacobs Field in Cleveland, Ohio 57 °F (14 °C), cloudy
Team	1	2	3	4	5	6	7	8	9	R	H	E
New York	1	0	0	0	0	0	0	0	0	1	4	0
Cleveland	0	2	0	0	4	0	0	0	X	6	12	0
WP: Bartolo Colón (1–0) LP: Andy Pettitte (0–1); Home runs: NYY: None; CLE: Jim Thome 2 (2), Manny Ramírez (2), Mark Whiten (1); Attendance: 44,904; Boxscore

At Jacobs Field for Game 3, the Yankees were rendered helpless by a barrage of Indian home runs and the dazzling pitching of young flamethrower Bartolo Colón. After the Yankees took the lead in the first when Chuck Knoblauch hit a leadoff single, moved to third on two groundouts and scored on a Bernie Williams RBI-single, the Indians took control of the game. Jim Thome led off the bottom of the second with a home run, then Mark Whiten doubled, advanced to third on a groundout, and scored on an Enrique Wilson single to make it 2–1 Cleveland. In the fifth, Manny Ramirez homered with two outs, then after Travis Fryman walked, back-to-back home runs by Thome and Whiten made it 6–1 Indians and knock starter Andy Pettitte out of the game. The strong pitching of Colon silenced the Yankees' bats the rest of the way as the New York batters were held hitless from the fifth inning onwards. Colon would finish with a four-hit complete game victory, and the Indians took a 2–1 edge in the best-of-seven series.

=== Game 4 ===
October 10, 1998 7:07 pm (EDT) at Jacobs Field in Cleveland, Ohio 58 °F (14 °C), cloudy
Team	1	2	3	4	5	6	7	8	9	R	H	E
New York	1	0	0	2	0	0	0	0	1	4	4	0
Cleveland	0	0	0	0	0	0	0	0	0	0	4	3
WP: Orlando Hernández (1–0) LP: Dwight Gooden (0–1); Home runs: NYY: Paul O'Neill (1); CLE: None; Attendance: 44,981; Boxscore

The Yankees looked to Orlando "El Duque" Hernández for a clutch pitching performance. Hernandez had come to the Yankees shrouded in mystery, having defected from Cuba just ten months earlier. He was making his postseason debut with this start against former Yankee Dwight Gooden. Paul O'Neill gave Hernandez a run to work with by hitting a home run off Gooden in the top of the first. In the fourth, Gooden walked two before Chili Davis's RBI double and Tino Martinez's sacrifice fly scored a run each. The Yankees added one more run in the ninth on Scott Brosius's sacrifice fly with two on off Paul Shuey, the run charged to Dave Burba. Hernandez pitched seven shutout innings while Mike Stanton and Mariano Rivera pitched a scoreless eighth and ninth, respectively as the Yankees' 4–0 win tied the series 2–2.

=== Game 5 ===
October 11, 1998 4:07 pm (EDT) at Jacobs Field in Cleveland, Ohio 61 °F (16 °C), sunny
Team	1	2	3	4	5	6	7	8	9	R	H	E
New York	3	1	0	1	0	0	0	0	0	5	6	0
Cleveland	2	0	0	0	0	1	0	0	0	3	8	0
WP: David Wells (2–0) LP: Chad Ogea (0–1) Sv: Mariano Rivera (1); Home runs: NYY: Chili Davis (1); CLE: Kenny Lofton (1), Jim Thome (3); Attendance: 44,966; Boxscore

Instead of pitching Jaret Wright in Game 5, Indians' manager Mike Hargrove looked to Chad Ogea, who pitched well in the 1997 World Series, to give his team a three games to two lead in the series. The Yankees loaded the bases with one out on a single, walk and hit-by-pitch before Chili Davis's single scored two. Another hit-by-pitch loaded the bases before Tim Raines's RBI groundout made it 3–0 Yankees. A leadoff homer by Kenny Lofton in the bottom of the inning off David Wells put the Indians on the board. After two singles and a wild pitch put runners on second and third with no outs, a sacrifice fly by Manny Ramírez made it a one-run game. In the second, Chuck Knoblauch drew a leadoff walk, moved to second on a sacrifice bunt, and scored on a Paul O'Neill single to make it 4–2. Chili Davis homered in the fourth off Wright to put the Yankees ahead by three, but Jim Thome hit his third home run of the series in the bottom of the sixth to make it a two-run game. Wells and the Yankees' bullpen held off any further Indians scoring, and the Yankees were one win away from the World Series.

=== Game 6 ===
October 13, 1998 8:07 pm (EDT) at Yankee Stadium (I) in Bronx, New York 54 °F (12 °C), overcast, drizzle
Team	1	2	3	4	5	6	7	8	9	R	H	E
Cleveland	0	0	0	0	5	0	0	0	0	5	8	3
New York	2	1	3	0	0	3	0	0	X	9	11	1
WP: David Cone (1–0) LP: Charles Nagy (0–1); Home runs: CLE: Jim Thome (4); NYY: Scott Brosius (1); Attendance: 57,142; Boxscore

In the bottom of the first, three consecutive one out singles off Charles Nagy by Derek Jeter, Paul O'Neill and Bernie Williams made it 1–0 Yankees, then Chili Davis's sacrifice fly to right field made it 2–0. Next inning, Joe Girardi singled with one out and scored on Chuck Knoblauch's double. Next inning, a single and error put two on with no outs and Scott Brosius's home run two outs later made it 6–0. David Cone pitched four shutout innings, but the Indians refused to go quietly. In the fifth, three consecutive singles loaded the bases with no outs, then David Justice walked to force in a run and after Manny Ramirez struck out, a grand slam by Jim Thome made it 6–5. Ramiro Mendoza, then pitched three shutout innings while in the sixth, Derek Jeter's triple with two on off Dave Burba made it 8–5, then Jeter scored on William's single off Paul Shuey to make it 9–5 Yankees. Mariano Rivera sealed a World Series berth in the ninth with Omar Vizquel grounding out to end the ALCS, sending the Yankees to their second World Series in three seasons.

== Composite box ==
1998 ALCS (4–2): New York Yankees over Cleveland Indians

Team	1	2	3	4	5	6	7	8	9	10	11	12	R	H	E
New York Yankees	12	2	3	3	0	4	2	0	1	0	0	0	27	43	2
Cleveland Indians	2	2	0	1	9	1	0	0	2	0	0	3	20	45	7
Total attendance: 306,259 Average attendance: 51,043
