= 1998 World Series =

94th edition of Major League Baseball's championship series

Team (Wins)	Managers	Season
New York Yankees (4)	Joe Torre	114–48 (.704), GA: 22
San Diego Padres (0)	Bruce Bochy	98–64 (.605), GA: 9 1/2
- Dates: October 17–21
- Venue(s): Yankee Stadium (New York); Qualcomm Stadium (San Diego)
- MVP: Scott Brosius (New York)
- Umpires: Rich Garcia (AL, crew chief), Mark Hirschbeck (NL), Dale Scott (AL), Dana DeMuth (NL), Tim Tschida (AL), Jerry Crawford (NL)
- Hall of Famers: Yankees: Derek Jeter; Tim Raines; Mariano Rivera; Joe Torre (manager); Padres: Tony Gwynn; Trevor Hoffman

Broadcast
- Television: Fox (United States); MLB International (International)
- TV announcers: Joe Buck, Tim McCarver and Bob Brenly (Fox); Gary Thorne and Ken Singleton (MLB International)
- Radio: ESPN; WABC (NYY); KFMB (SD)
- Radio announcers: Jon Miller and Joe Morgan (ESPN); John Sterling and Michael Kay (WABC); Jerry Coleman, Ted Leitner and Bob Chandler (KFMB)
- ALCS: New York Yankees over Cleveland Indians (4–2)
- NLCS: San Diego Padres over Atlanta Braves (4–2)

The 1998 World Series was the championship series of Major League Baseball's (MLB) 1998 season. The 94th edition of the World Series, it was a best-of-seven playoff between the American League (AL) champion New York Yankees and the National League (NL) champion San Diego Padres. The Yankees swept the Padres in four games to win their second World Series championship in three years and their 24th overall. Yankees third baseman Scott Brosius was named the World Series Most Valuable Player.

The Yankees advanced to the World Series by defeating the Texas Rangers in the AL Division Series, three games to zero, and then the Cleveland Indians in the AL Championship Series, four games to two. The Padres advanced to the series by defeating the Houston Astros in the NL Division Series, three games to one, and then the Atlanta Braves in the NL Championship Series, four games to two. It was the Yankees' second appearance in the World Series in three years, and San Diego's second World Series appearance overall, their first since losing in 1984.

This was officially the first World Series that Bud Selig presided over as Commissioner of Baseball, although he had presided over the Commissioner's Trophy presentation at the end of the 1995 and 1997 World Series as the interim Commissioner. For the first time, the same city—San Diego—hosted both the final World Series game and the Super Bowl the same year; not only were they held in the same city, they were both also held in the same stadium, Qualcomm Stadium.

== Background ==
This was the seventh New York–California matchup in the World Series (1962, 1963, 1973, 1977, 1978, 1981).

=== San Diego Padres ===
After winning their first National League pennant in 1984, the Padres fell into futility. Disagreements between then-manager Dick Williams and the Padres front office led to his dismissal in 1986. Following multiple consecutive seasons of missing the playoffs, friction between players, management, and front office personnel, and two ownership changes, the team's fortunes changed when the club hired Bruce Bochy as their next manager in 1995. In his first season, he had turned around a club that had won only 40 games in 1994 (though the season was cut short by a players' strike) into a 70–74 team the following year. In 1996, the Padres finished with a 91–71 record winning the National League West, earning Bochy NL Manager of the Year honors. Though they were swept by the St. Louis Cardinals in that year's National League Division Series. Despite taking a step back in 1997 in which they finished in last place with a record of 76-86, they would rebound the next year and finished with a franchise record 98–64 record in 1998. Key players such as Tony Gwynn (who was a part of the team's 1984-pennant winning season), Greg Vaughn, and pitchers Andy Ashby, Trevor Hoffman (who saved 53 games that season and was a runner-up in Cy Young Award voting), and Kevin Brown all contributed heavily to San Diego's success in 1998. Vaughn in particular drew notice for his home run count during the regular season as it compared to the counts of star sluggers Mark McGwire and Sammy Sosa; Vaughn had 50 while McGwire and Sosa had 70 and 66, respectively.

The Padres entered the 1998 MLB Postseason as the #3 seed in the National League. They began their playoff run by defeating the second-seeded Houston Astros in the division series 3 games to 1, thanks to timely hitting from relatively unknown hitter Jim Leyritz, who hit 3 home runs in the NLDS alone (Leyritz had hit 4 homers in 62 games played during the regular season). In the championship series against the top-seeded Atlanta Braves, the Padres dismantled the "Big Three" lineup of the Braves consisting of John Smoltz, Tom Glavine, and Greg Maddux thanks to more timely hitting from the team's lineup. The Padres defeated the Braves in the NLCS 4 games to 2, winning the franchise's second pennant en route to the World Series.

=== New York Yankees ===
In contrast to the Padres, the Yankees entered the 1998 season with high expectations. Following their victory in the 1996 World Series, the Yankees regressed to second place in the AL East in 1997 and were dealt a stunning five-game defeat against the Cleveland Indians in the American League Division Series. During the 1997–98 offseason, the Yankees made multiple moves, most notably trading for Scott Brosius from the Oakland Athletics, Chuck Knoblauch from the Minnesota Twins, and purchasing the contract of Alfonso Soriano from Nippon Professional Baseball. Alongside these new acquisitions, the Yankees boasted a plethora of talent across numerous positions, both on offense and defense. The team's "Core Four" of pitcher Andy Pettitte, shortstop Derek Jeter, catcher Jorge Posada, and closer Mariano Rivera, alongside other stars like pitchers David Cone and ace David Wells, and outfielders Paul O'Neill and Bernie Williams helped the Yankees reach new heights in 1998. Under third-year manager Joe Torre, the Yankees started the season with a 46–13 record and would never look back, carrying their momentum to a 114–48 regular season record by the start of the playoffs, a franchise record for most wins in a season. The team's 114 wins surpassed the American League record for wins in a season; the previous record was held by the 1954 Cleveland Indians, who won 111 games (though the Yankees' record has since been surpassed by the 2001 Seattle Mariners, who won 116 games).

The Yankees entered the 1998 postseason as the overall #1 seed. They swept the third-seeded Texas Rangers 3 games to 0 in the division series, thanks to solid pitching from Wells, Pettitte, Cone, and Rivera, holding the Rangers' offense to just one run in three games. In the championship series, the Yankees faced the second-seeded Cleveland Indians in a rematch of their 1997 division series faceoff. New York won Game 1, but suffered back-to-back losses that put the Indians ahead 2 games to 1, stunning many onlookers. However, the team redeemed itself by winning the last three games of the series, which included the series-clinching game at home to win the Yankees' second AL pennant in three years.

== Summary ==
New York won the series, 4–0.

Game	Date	Score	Location	Time	Attendance
1	October 17	San Diego Padres – 6, New York Yankees – 9	Yankee Stadium	3:29	56,712
2	October 18	San Diego Padres – 3, New York Yankees – 9	Yankee Stadium	3:31	56,692
3	October 20	New York Yankees – 5, San Diego Padres – 4	Qualcomm Stadium	3:14	64,667
4	October 21	New York Yankees – 3, San Diego Padres – 0	Qualcomm Stadium	2:58	65,427

== Matchups ==
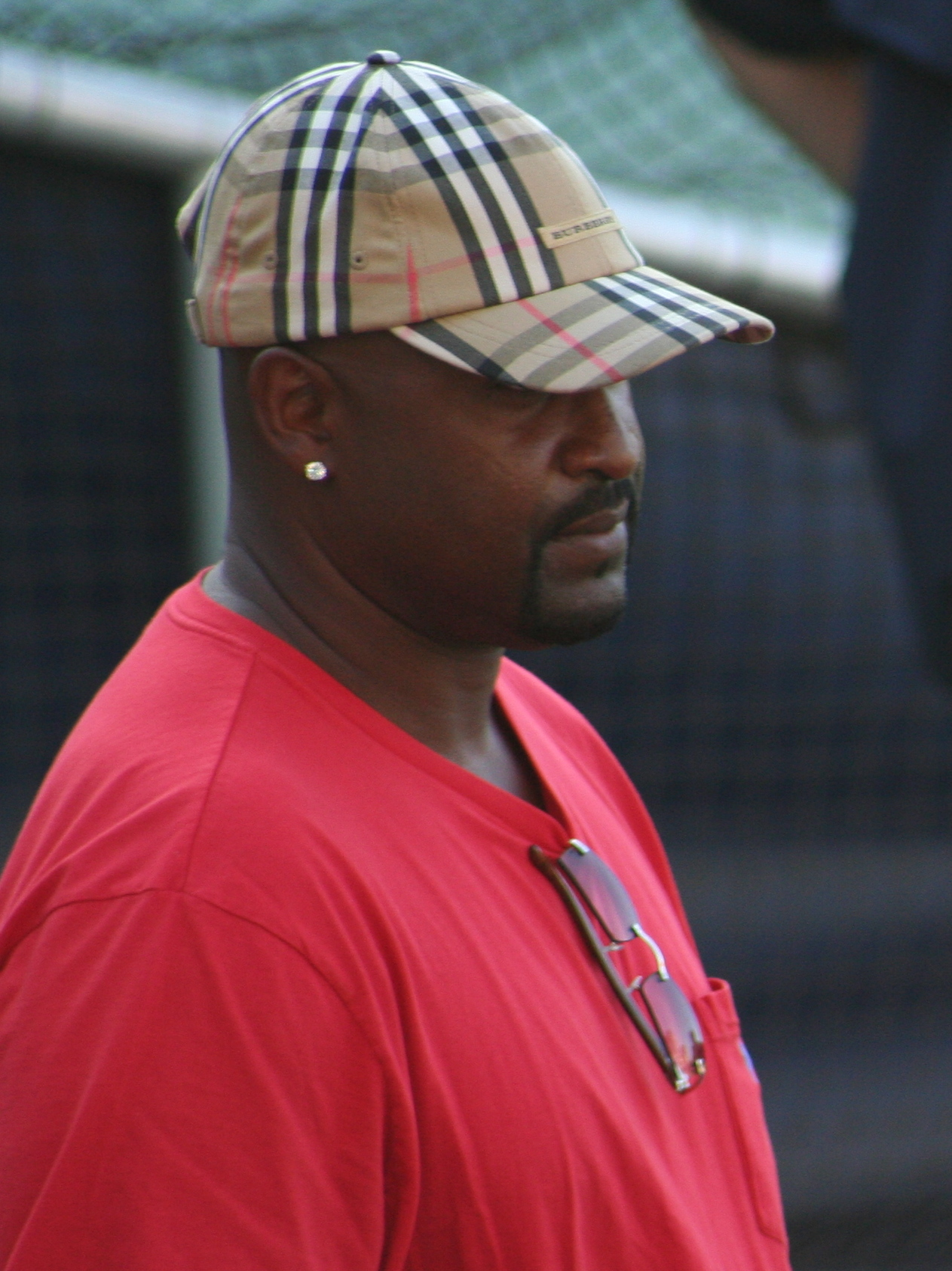
Greg Vaughn, despite playing in a losing effort, hit two home runs in Game 1 of the series.

=== Game 1 ===
October 17, 1998 8:00 pm (EDT) at Yankee Stadium in Bronx, New York 59 °F (15 °C), mostly cloudy
Team	1	2	3	4	5	6	7	8	9	R	H	E
San Diego	0	0	2	0	3	0	0	1	0	6	8	1
New York	0	2	0	0	0	0	7	0	X	9	9	1
WP: David Wells (1–0) LP: Donne Wall (0–1) Sv: Mariano Rivera (1); Home runs: SD: Greg Vaughn 2 (2), Tony Gwynn (1); NYY: Chuck Knoblauch (1), Tino Martinez (1); Attendance: 56,712; Boxscore

In Game 1, Kevin Brown took the hill for the Padres while the Yankees sent ALCS MVP David Wells to start. The Yankees began the scoring in the second inning, when rookie Ricky Ledee laced a two-run double into the right field corner with the bases loaded. However, the Padres battered Wells hard, beginning in the third inning when Greg Vaughn homered to right-center with a man aboard tying the game up at two runs apiece. In the fifth inning, Tony Gwynn, who was not a power hitter, smashed a two-run shot off the facing of the upper deck (Gwynn's first home run in postseason play), followed up immediately by Vaughn's second dinger of the night. Trailing 5–2, Jorge Posada singled and Ledee walked with one out in the seventh for the Yankees, ending the night for Brown. Chuck Knoblauch homered off of Donne Wall to tie the game at five. After Derek Jeter singled, Mark Langston relieved Wall and after Paul O'Neill flied out, walked two to load the bases. A 2–2 count call by home plate umpire Rich Garcia would prove to be decisive. Langston's pitch was shown to be borderline and Garcia called it a ball. On the next pitch, Tino Martinez sent a grand slam into the upper deck, giving the Yankees a 9–5 lead. The Padres would score one more run in the eighth off of Mariano Rivera with the run charged to Jeff Nelson, but Rivera then pitched a scoreless ninth as the Yankees won Game 1, 9–6.

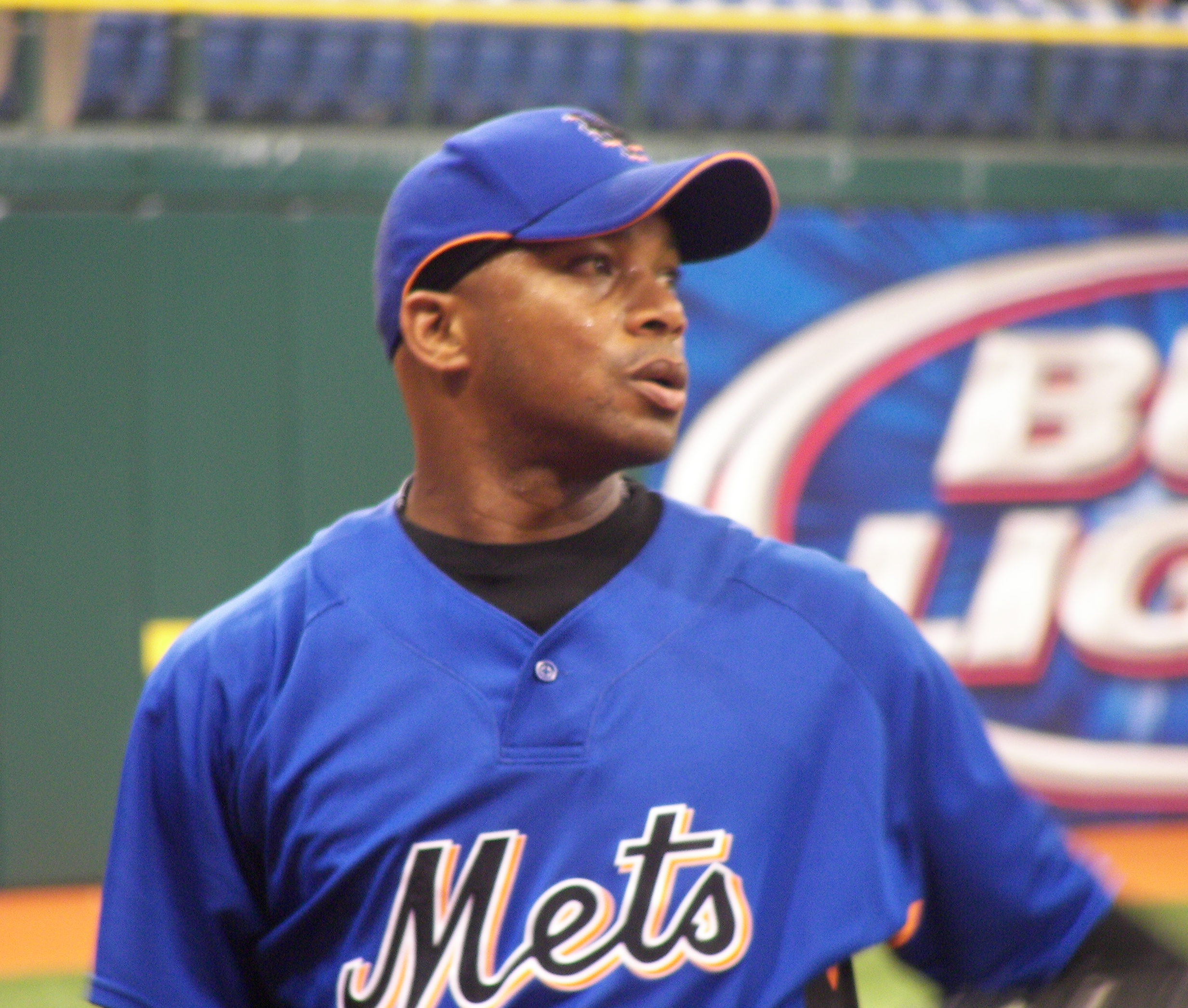
Orlando Hernández, the winning pitcher in Game 2.

=== Game 2 ===
October 18, 1998 7:55 pm (EDT) at Yankee Stadium in Bronx, New York 69 °F (21 °C), mostly cloudy
Team	1	2	3	4	5	6	7	8	9	R	H	E
San Diego	0	0	0	0	1	0	0	2	0	3	10	1
New York	3	3	1	0	2	0	0	0	X	9	16	0
WP: Orlando Hernández (1–0) LP: Andy Ashby (0–1); Home runs: SD: None; NYY: Bernie Williams (1), Jorge Posada (1); Attendance: 56,692; Boxscore

In Game 2, the Bombers would go up 2–0 in the Series thanks to a dreadful outing by San Diego starter Andy Ashby. Catcher Greg Meyers, starting for the first time in a month, was also ineffective. Chuck Knoblauch walked to lead off the first, stole second, and scored on third basemen Ken Caminiti's throwing error to first on Paul O'Neill's ground ball. After Bernie Williams grounded out, RBI singles by Chili Davis and Scott Brosius gave the Yankees a 3–0 lead. Next inning, Derek Jeter drove in Knoblauch with a single, then Williams's home run made it 6–0 Yankees. They added to their lead in the fourth on Ricky Ledee's RBI double. New York started Cuban import Orlando Hernández, who pitched four shutout innings before allowing a two-out triple to Chris Gomez in the fifth inning. Gomez scored on Quilvio Veras's double to put the Padres on the board, but in the bottom of the inning, Jorge Posada's two-run home run off of Brian Boehringer extended the Yankees' lead to 9–1. Mike Stanton relieved Hernandez in the eighth inning and allowed a leadoff double to Caminiti, who scored two outs later on Ruben Rivera's double. After Carlos Hernandez singled, Jeff Nelson relieved Stanton and allowed an RBI single to Mark Sweeney before striking out Veras to end the inning. Nelson then pitched a perfect ninth as the Yankees 9–3 win gave them a 2–0 series lead.

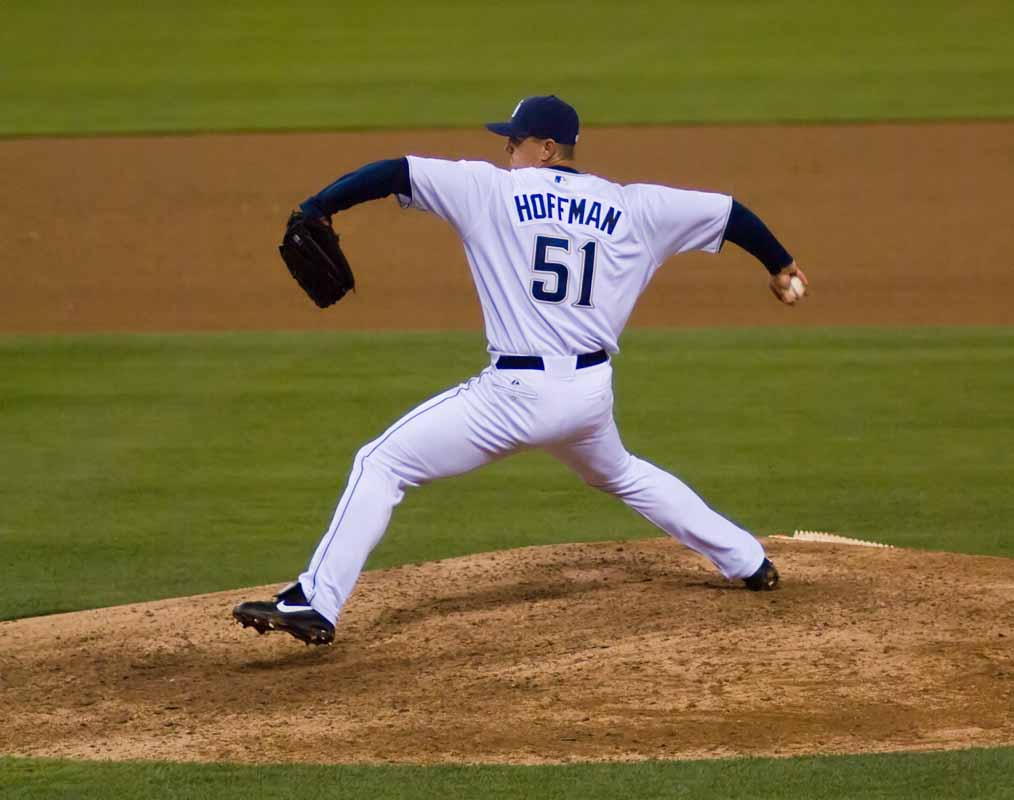
Padres reliever Trevor Hoffman allowed a three-run home run off Scott Brosius in the eighth inning and was charged with the loss.

=== Game 3 ===
October 20, 1998 5:20 pm (PDT) at Qualcomm Stadium in San Diego, California 68 °F (20 °C), clear
Team	1	2	3	4	5	6	7	8	9	R	H	E
New York	0	0	0	0	0	0	2	3	0	5	9	1
San Diego	0	0	0	0	0	3	0	1	0	4	7	1
WP: Ramiro Mendoza (1–0) LP: Trevor Hoffman (0–1) Sv: Mariano Rivera (2); Home runs: NYY: Scott Brosius 2 (2); SD: None; Attendance: 64,667; Boxscore

The Yankees sent David Cone to the mound to face former Yankee pitcher Sterling Hitchcock, the MVP of the NLCS. Cone and Hitchcock dueled for 5 1/2 shutout innings, with Cone holding the Padres hitless. That changed in the bottom of the sixth inning when Hitchcock himself led off the inning with a single off Cone, and Quilvio Veras walked. Tony Gwynn then shot a single down the line past Tino Martinez at first base to score Hitchcock and Paul O'Neill's throw sailed into the dugout for an error, allowing Veras to score and Gwynn to advance to third. Gwynn then scored on Ken Caminiti's sacrifice fly to the warning track to give San Diego a 3–0 lead. However, the Yanks immediately jumped on Hitchcock for two runs, beginning with a home run to left-center by Scott Brosius. The second run came in after Shane Spencer doubled, and Hitchcock was relieved by Joey Hamilton. Spencer then scored on an error by Ken Caminiti, but Hamilton escaped without further damage. In the eighth, Padres reliever Randy Myers walked O'Neill to open the inning, which prompted Padre manager Bruce Bochy to replace Myers with closer Trevor Hoffman, who had saved 53 games and was a future Hall of Famer. However, Hoffman blew the save when he walked Tino Martinez before Scott Brosius tagged a three-run blast over the fence in dead center. The Padres tried to rally. Veras doubled with one out off of Ramiro Mendoza, who was then relieved by Mariano Rivera. Rivera allowed a single to Gwynn and a deep sacrifice fly to Greg Vaughn to cut the lead to 5–4, but Caminiti struck out to end the inning. In the ninth, Rivera got two outs, but Padre catcher Carlos Hernandez singled and was controversially replaced by John Vander Wal (due to Vander Wal being an above-average pinch hitter and probably the best left on the Padre bench) as a pinch runner. Pinch hitter Mark Sweeney extended the inning with another single to advance Vander Wal to third. However, utility man Andy Sheets struck out to end the game.

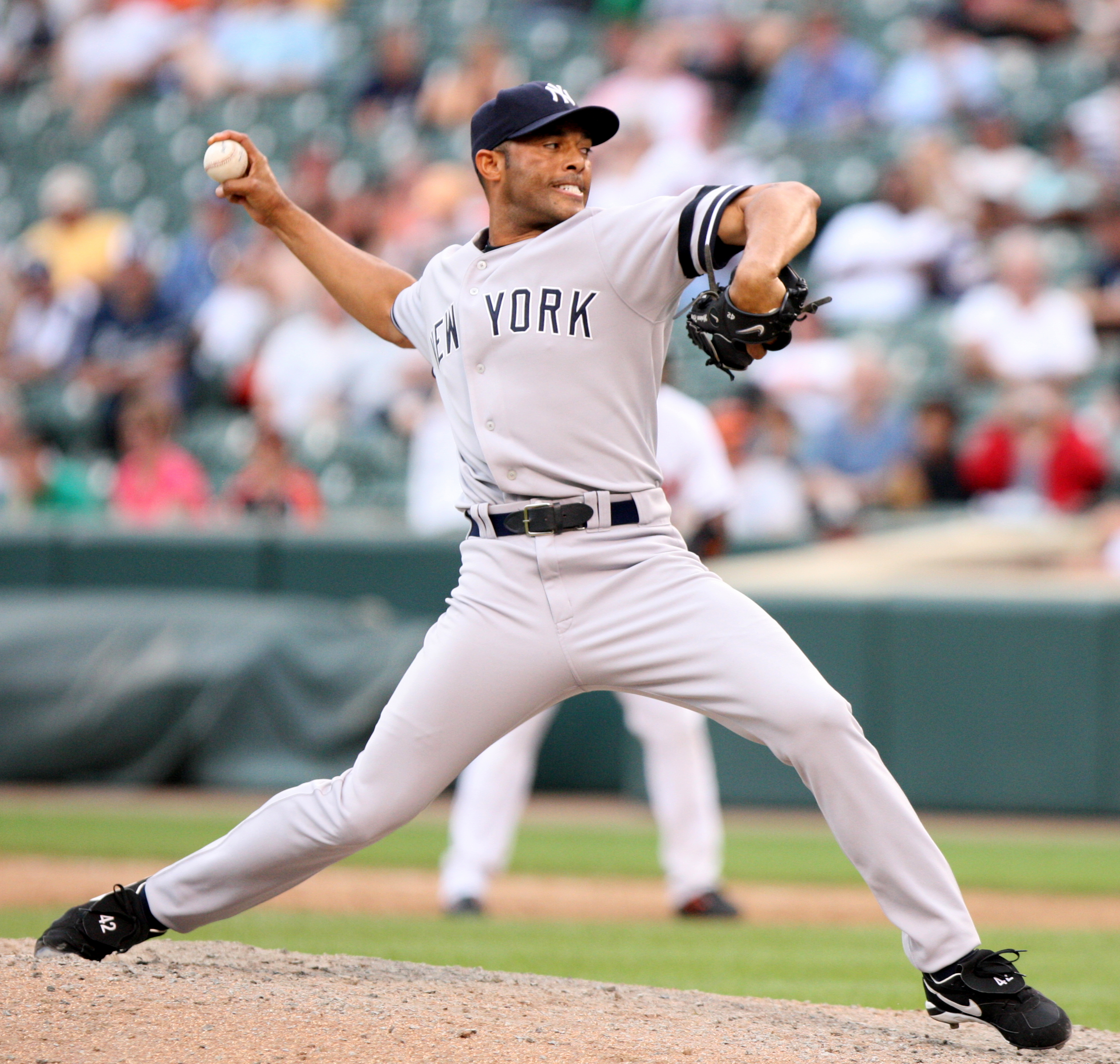
Mariano Rivera pitched out of a bases loaded jam in the eighth inning and was credited with the save in Game 4.

=== Game 4 ===
October 21, 1998 5:20 pm (PDT) at Qualcomm Stadium in San Diego, California 66 °F (19 °C), clear
Team	1	2	3	4	5	6	7	8	9	R	H	E
New York	0	0	0	0	0	1	0	2	0	3	9	0
San Diego	0	0	0	0	0	0	0	0	0	0	7	0
WP: Andy Pettitte (1–0) LP: Kevin Brown (0–1) Sv: Mariano Rivera (3); Attendance: 65,427; Boxscore

Andy Pettitte, who struggled throughout the regular season and had turned in a poor start in the ALCS, outdueled Kevin Brown in Game 4, throwing 7 1/3 shutout innings. The Yankees scored their first run of the game in the sixth inning on Bernie Williams's RBI groundout with runners on second and third, then added to their lead in the eighth on Scott Brosius's based-loaded RBI single followed by Ricky Ledee's sacrifice fly. That was all Brown allowed in eight solid innings, but it turned out not to be enough. In the bottom of the inning, however, the Padres were able to get two batters on base against Pettitte. Yankees reliever Jeff Nelson struck out Greg Vaughn; then Mariano Rivera was called upon. After Ken Caminiti reached with a single to load the bases, Rivera was able to get Jim Leyritz, known for his clutch postseason home runs, to fly out to end the threat. Rivera pitched a scoreless ninth inning to end the Series. Game 4 of the World Series would turn out to be the last postseason game played at Qualcomm Stadium.

== Composite box ==
1998 World Series (4–0): New York Yankees (A.L.) over San Diego Padres (N.L.)

Team	1	2	3	4	5	6	7	8	9	R	H	E
New York Yankees	3	5	1	0	2	1	9	5	0	26	43	2
San Diego Padres	0	0	2	0	4	3	0	4	0	13	32	3
Total attendance: 243,498 Average attendance: 60,875; Winning player's share: $312,042 Losing player's share: $204,144

== Broadcasting ==
The television rights for the 1998 World Series went to Fox, as they had the rights to the World Series in even-numbered years under the television contract that was signed in 1996. Joe Buck once again provided the play-by-play, with Tim McCarver and Bob Brenly alongside him in the booth.

For the first time, ESPN Radio was the home of the World Series, having taken the national radio rights for Major League Baseball from CBS Radio. Jon Miller and Joe Morgan provided the coverage for the network.

== Series overview and aftermath ==
=== Yankees ===
The series win brought the Yankees' franchise championship total to 24, tying the NHL’s Montreal Canadiens for the most championships won by a franchise in the four major North American professional sports leagues. They would break the Canadiens record the next year, sweeping the Atlanta Braves for their 25th title.

The 1998 Yankees are considered to be one of the top teams in baseball history. With the win, the Yankees posted an MLB record with the most overall wins in a single season in MLB history with 125 (including the postseason). The previous record for most overall wins in one season was 116, set by the 1986 World Series champion New York Mets. The sweep marked the first time the Yankees swept a World Series since 1950 when they swept the Philadelphia Phillies. They were also the first team to sweep a World Series since the Cincinnati Reds in 1990.

This was the first time since 1989 that a team had won a World Series after having the best record in the regular season. It was also the first time since 1986 that a team won a World Series after posting at least 100 wins in the regular season.

On October 11, 2005, A&E Home Video released The New York Yankees Fall Classic Collectors Edition (1996–2001) DVD set. Game 3 of the 1998 World Series is included in the set.

=== Padres ===
The loss made the Padres the first expansion team to lose two World Series, having lost in 1984 to the Detroit Tigers. As of 2023, the Padres are one of only two teams in Major League Baseball to win at least two league championships and never win the World Series, the other team being the Tampa Bay Rays.

Until 2020, Bruce Bochy was the only Padres player or manager to be on every Padres playoff team. Bochy, however, would go on to win three World Series titles as manager of the San Francisco Giants in 2010, 2012, and 2014 and then another with the Texas Rangers in 2023. His four World Series championships tied Joe Torre and Walter Alston for fourth most as manager.

To date, this remains the most recent championship game or series a professional San Diego sports team has participated in, although San Diego State basketball did participate in the 2023 national championship game. The Padres' loss was also significant as it also assured that the city of San Diego's sporting championship drought since 1963 would continue, which has become the longest streak of such futility for a city with at least one professional sports team.

The Padres would lose Kevin Brown in free agency to the Los Angeles Dodgers. Brown was the first baseball player to earn a $100 million contract. Brown was eventually traded from the Dodgers to the Yankees in 2004, where he stayed until his retirement in 2005.

== See also ==
- 1998 Japan Series
- List of World Series sweeps

== Sources ==
- Forman, Sean L. "1998 World Series". Baseball-Reference.com - Major League Statistics and Information. Archived from the original on December 12, 2007.
