= Jorge Posada =

Puerto Rican baseball player (born 1970)

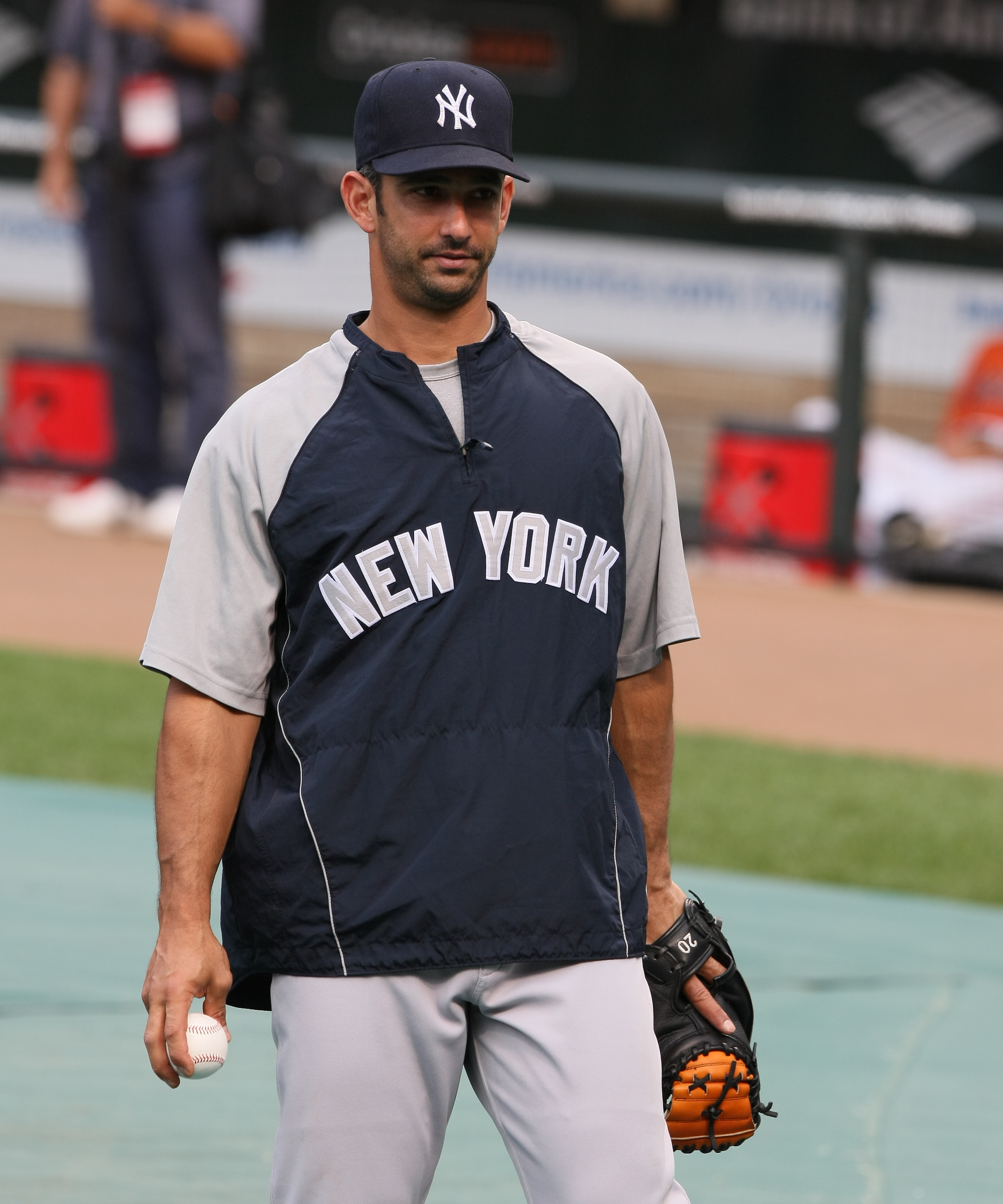
- Posada with the New York Yankees in 2009
- Catcher
- Born: August 17, 1970 (age 56); Santurce, San Juan, Puerto Rico
- Batted: Switch Threw: Right

MLB debut
- September 4, 1995, for the New York Yankees

Last MLB appearance
- September 28, 2011, for the New York Yankees

MLB statistics
- Batting average: .273
- Home runs: 275
- Runs batted in: 1,065
- Stats at Baseball Reference

Teams
- New York Yankees (1995–2011)

Career highlights and awards
- 5× All-Star (2000–2003, 2007); 4× World Series champion (1998–2000, 2009); 5× Silver Slugger Award (2000–2003, 2007); New York Yankees No. 20 retired; Monument Park honoree

Jorge Rafael Posada Villeta (born August 17, 1970) is a Puerto Rican former professional baseball catcher who played 17 seasons in Major League Baseball (MLB) for the New York Yankees. Posada recorded a .273 batting average, 275 home runs, and 1,065 runs batted in (RBIs) during his career. A switch hitter, Posada was a five-time All-Star, won five Silver Slugger Awards, and was on the roster for four World Series championship teams.

Drafted by the Yankees in 1990, Posada was originally an infielder before moving to catcher during his minor league career. He debuted in the major leagues in 1995, but it was not until 1998 that he found regular playing time. A solid-hitting catcher, Posada established himself as a mainstay in the Yankees lineup and as one of the "Core Four" players who contributed to the Yankees' winning seasons. In 2003, he finished third in voting for the American League (AL) Most Valuable Player Award and became only the second Yankees catcher after Yogi Berra to hit 30 home runs in a season. Posada added one of his best seasons in 2007 at age 37 when he batted .338. Following a stint as designated hitter in 2011, he retired.

Posada is only the fifth MLB catcher with at least 1,500 hits, 350 doubles, 275 home runs, and 1,000 RBIs in a career. From 2000 to 2011, he compiled more RBIs and home runs than any other catcher in baseball. He is the only MLB catcher to ever bat .330 or better with 40 doubles, 20 home runs, and 90 RBIs in a single season. Away from baseball, Posada is the founder of the Jorge Posada Foundation, which is involved with research for craniosynostosis, a birth defect that impacts his son.

== Early life and education ==
Jorge Posada was born on August 17, 1970, in the Santurce district of San Juan, Puerto Rico to a Cuban father and a Dominican mother. He attended Alejandrino High School in San Juan, where he participated in several sports, including baseball. He was named to the all-star team in 1988–89 as a shortstop. He also umpired for the girls' softball team.

Posada's SAT scores were not high enough for him to enroll in a four-year college. Fred Frickie, the head coach of the college baseball team at Calhoun Community College in Decatur, Alabama, recruited Posada without scouting him in 1991. Posada accepted the scholarship at Calhoun without visiting the school. He made friends on the team quickly. Posada has also spoken about the racism he encountered from classmates at the school. He was voted best hitter (1990), co-captain (1991), and selected all-conference (1991). He was inducted in the Alabama Community College Athletic Hall of Fame in 2006 and Calhoun retired his number (#6).

== Professional career ==
=== Draft and minor leagues (1990–1996) ===
Posada was drafted by the Yankees in the 24th round of the 1990 Major League Baseball draft as an infielder. Yankees scout Leon Wurth followed Posada as he played for Calhoun, and rated his bat and attitude highly. Posada signed with the Yankees for a signing bonus close to $30,000. The team agreed to keep him in their system for three years. Posada played second base in his first season with the Oneonta Yankees in the Class A-Short Season New York–Penn League, in which he had a .235 batting average and four home runs in 71 games played. As the Yankees felt that Posada lacked the speed to remain an infielder, they began to transition Posada into a catcher in 1992. Though Posada initially resisted the position change, as he didn't feel able to catch full-time, he agreed. That year, he played for the Greensboro Hornets of the Class A South Atlantic League. He finished the season with a .277 batting average, 38 extra-base hits, including 12 home runs and 58 runs batted in (RBIs). He caught Andy Pettitte for the first time while they were teammates at Greensboro.

A full-time catcher in 1993, Posada started the season with the Prince William Cannons of the Class A-Advanced Carolina League. After he hit 17 home runs and recorded 61 RBIs in 118 games for the Cannons, he was promoted to the Albany-Colonie Yankees of the Class AA Eastern League. He earned Carolina League mid-season and post-season All-Star honors. Still working on his defense, Posada committed 38 passed balls in the 1993 season, the most in the Carolina League.

The Yankees promoted Posada to the Columbus Clippers of the Class AAA International League in 1994. He batted .240 with 11 home runs on the year. His left leg was broken and ankle was dislocated in a home plate collision, prematurely ending his season. After recovering from the injury, Posada played for the Clippers for the majority of the 1995 season, batting .255 with eight home runs and 51 RBIs. The Yankees included Posada in trade discussions with the Seattle Mariners in their attempts to acquire Tino Martinez. Three weeks later, the Yankees attempted to trade Posada and Mariano Rivera to the Cincinnati Reds for David Wells, but that trade was not accepted. Returning to Columbus in 1996, Posada batted .271. He appeared in the 1996 Triple-A All-Star Game.

=== New York Yankees (1995–2011) ===
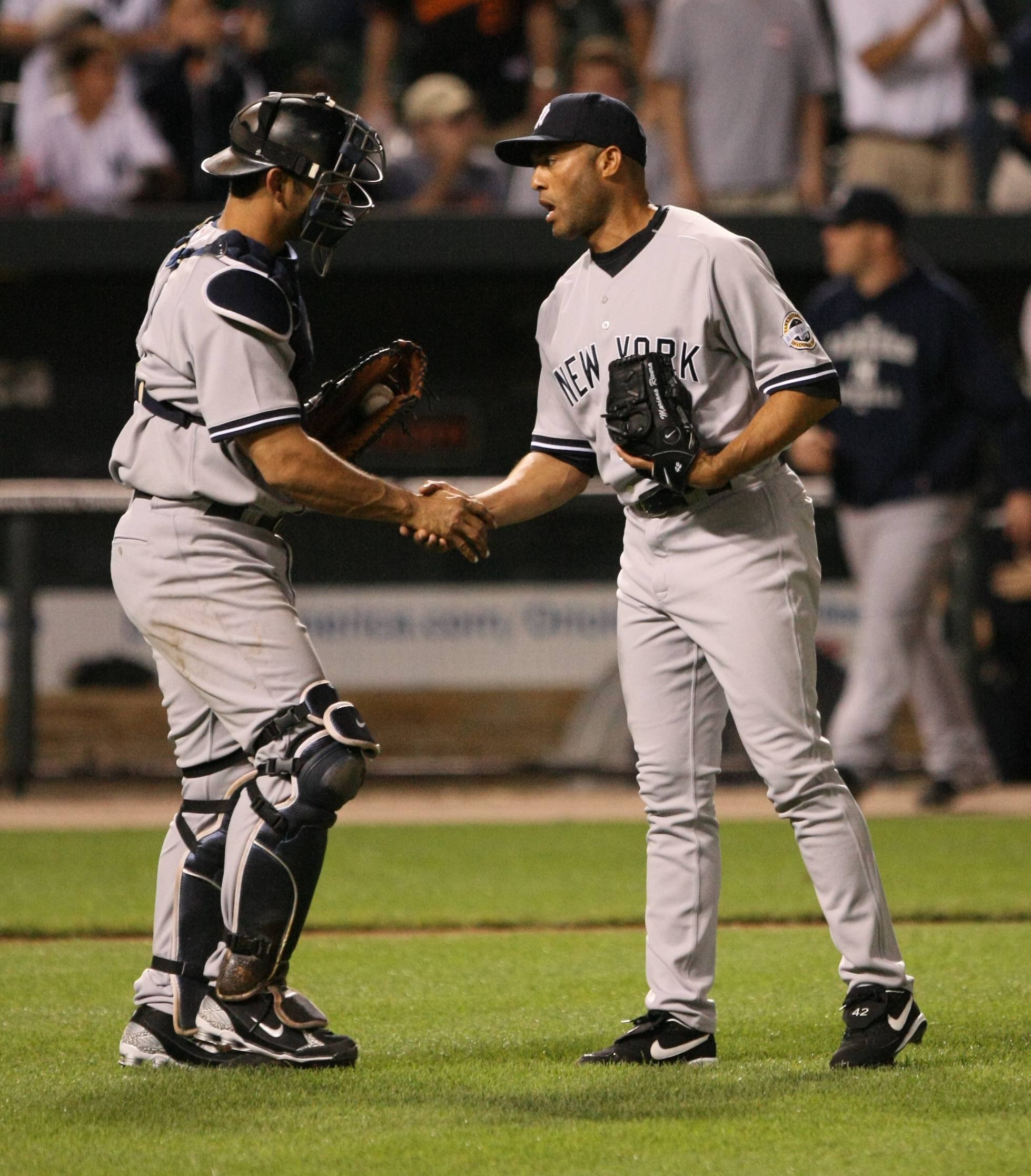
Posada (left) greets Mariano Rivera at the end of a game.

==== 1995–1999 ====
Posada made his MLB debut with the Yankees in 1995, replacing Jim Leyritz in the ninth inning of a game on September 4, 1995. Despite his appearing in only one game during the regular season, the Yankees included Posada on their postseason roster, and he appeared in Game 2 of the 1995 American League Division Series (ALDS) as a pinch runner, scoring a run. The Yankees lost the division series in five games to the Seattle Mariners.

Posada began the 1996 season with Columbus, but was promoted to the Yankees late in the season. He appeared in eight games, making his first start on September 25, recording one hit and one walk. Posada did not appear in the postseason but the Yankees still succeeded as they defeated the Atlanta Braves in the 1996 World Series. Despite not being on the 1996 postseason roster for the Yankees, Posada still received a 1996 World Series Championship ring.

Posada succeeded Leyritz in 1997 as the backup catcher to Joe Girardi, with Girardi serving as a mentor to Posada. Posada was expected to appear in approximately 40 games in 1997; he started in 52. Posada appeared in 60 games during the 1997 season and batted .250 with six home runs and 25 RBIs. The Yankees made the postseason again, but the team lost in the 1997 ALDS to the Cleveland Indians. After the 1997 season, the Yankees offered Posada and Mike Lowell to the Montreal Expos for Pedro Martínez; the Expos traded Martínez to the Boston Red Sox, instead.

During the offseason, Posada hired a personal trainer and running coach, who helped improve his physical conditioning. Going into the 1998 season, Posada pushed the Yankees to increase his playing time. Posada caught David Wells' perfect game on May 17, 1998. Overall, Posada batted .268 with 17 home runs and 63 RBIs over 111 games in the 1998 season. The Yankees reached the postseason for the fourth consecutive year and the team won the 1998 World Series in four games against the San Diego Padres.

The Yankees renewed Posada's contract for $350,000 for the 1999 season, less than the $650,000 he requested. Posada struggled in April, batting .146 and striking out 15 times in 46 appearances. After batting .210 at the All-Star Break, he batted .285 for the remainder of the season, ending the year with a .245 batting average, 12 home runs, and 57 RBIs. He allowed 17 passed balls. Posada played in 112 games with 379 at-bats, while Girardi played in 65 games with 209 at-bats. While Girardi began the 1999 postseason as the regular catcher, Posada saw increased playing time. The Yankees entered the postseason once again and won the 1999 World Series against the Braves in only four games.

==== 2000–2006 ====
Girardi left the Yankees as a free agent after the 1999 season, and the Yankees entrusted Posada with the everyday catching job. Yankees' manager Joe Torre selected Posada for his first All-Star Game appearance that season. During the 2000 season, Posada batted .287 with 28 homers, 86 RBIs, 107 walks, and 151 strikeouts. The Yankees reached the postseason once again, and they won the 2000 World Series against the New York Mets. Posada won the Silver Slugger Award for catcher in 2000.

Posada appeared in the 2001 MLB All-Star Game. For the season, Posada batted .277 with 22 home runs and 95 RBIs, but led the league in passed balls and errors among catchers. The Yankees entered the postseason for another shot to win a championship, but lost to the Arizona Diamondbacks in the 2001 World Series in seven games. Posada won his second consecutive Silver Slugger Award in 2001. Posada started the 2002 MLB All-Star Game. He batted .268 with 20 home runs and 99 RBIs, and grounded into an AL-leading 23 double plays. He again led all catchers in errors. The Yankees entered the postseason again but lost in the 2002 ALDS to the Anaheim Angels. Posada won a Silver Slugger Award for a third consecutive season. Posada again started at catcher in the 2003 All-Star Game. For the season, he hit 30 home runs and drove in 101 runs, both career highs. He batted .281 and was also fifth in the league in OBP (.405), and sixth in the league in walks (93; walking 17.5% of the time, a career high). He tied Yogi Berra's record for most home runs by a Yankee catcher. The Yankees again reached the postseason but lost to the Florida Marlins in the 2003 World Series, with Posada being tagged by pitcher Josh Beckett for the final out of the series. After the season, Posada won his fourth consecutive Silver Slugger Award. He finished third in the MVP voting, behind Alex Rodriguez and Carlos Delgado.

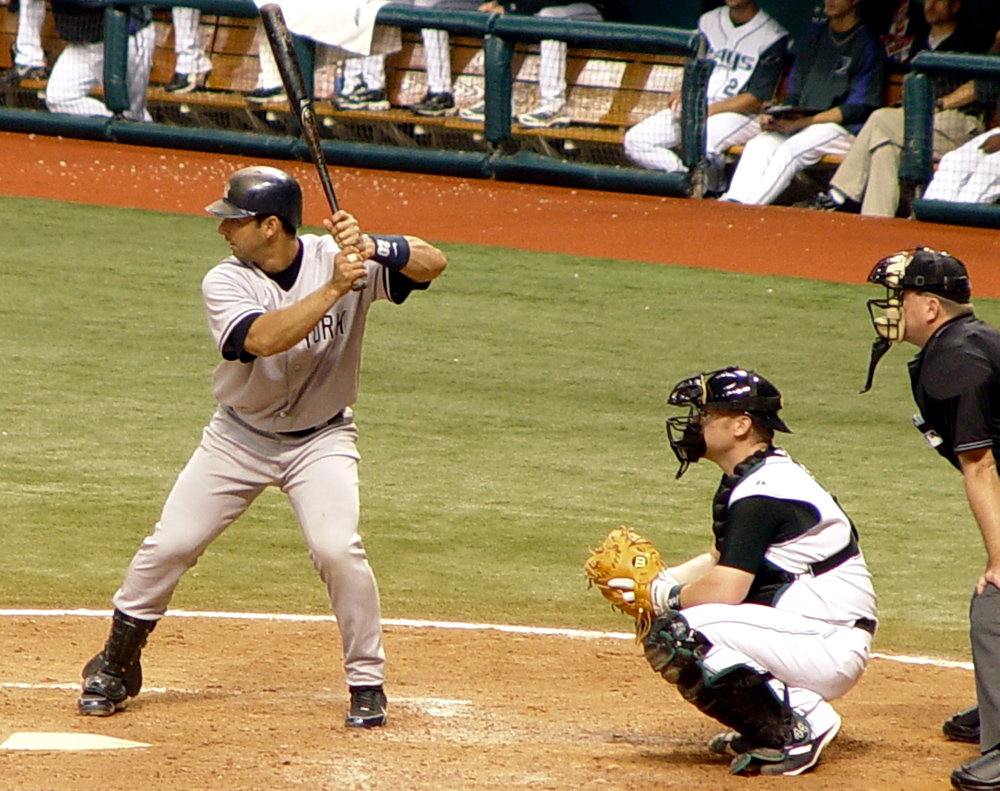
Posada batting in 2005

In 2004, Posada grounded into 24 double plays, which tied for the most in the AL, but batted .272 with 21 home runs and 81 RBIs. After defeating the Minnesota Twins in the 2004 ALDS, the Yankees lost to the Boston Red Sox in the 2004 ALCS despite leading the series three games to none. In 2005, Posada batted .262 with 19 home runs and 71 RBIs. The Yankees reached the postseason again, but lost to the Los Angeles Angels of Anaheim in the 2005 ALDS.

In 2006, Posada posted his highest batting average and home run total since 2003. He also led the major leagues with 20 pinch hits. In addition, work with new first base coach Tony Peña, a former catcher, helped him improve his percentage of runners thrown out stealing second almost 60 points above his career average. However, he again led the league in passed balls. He batted .277 and had 23 home runs with 93 RBIs. On May 16, Posada led the Yankees to a victory despite falling behind by nine runs, matching the largest deficit the Yankees overcame for a victory in franchise history. He registered a +0.93 win probability added in that game, the highest of his career.

==== 2007–2010 ====
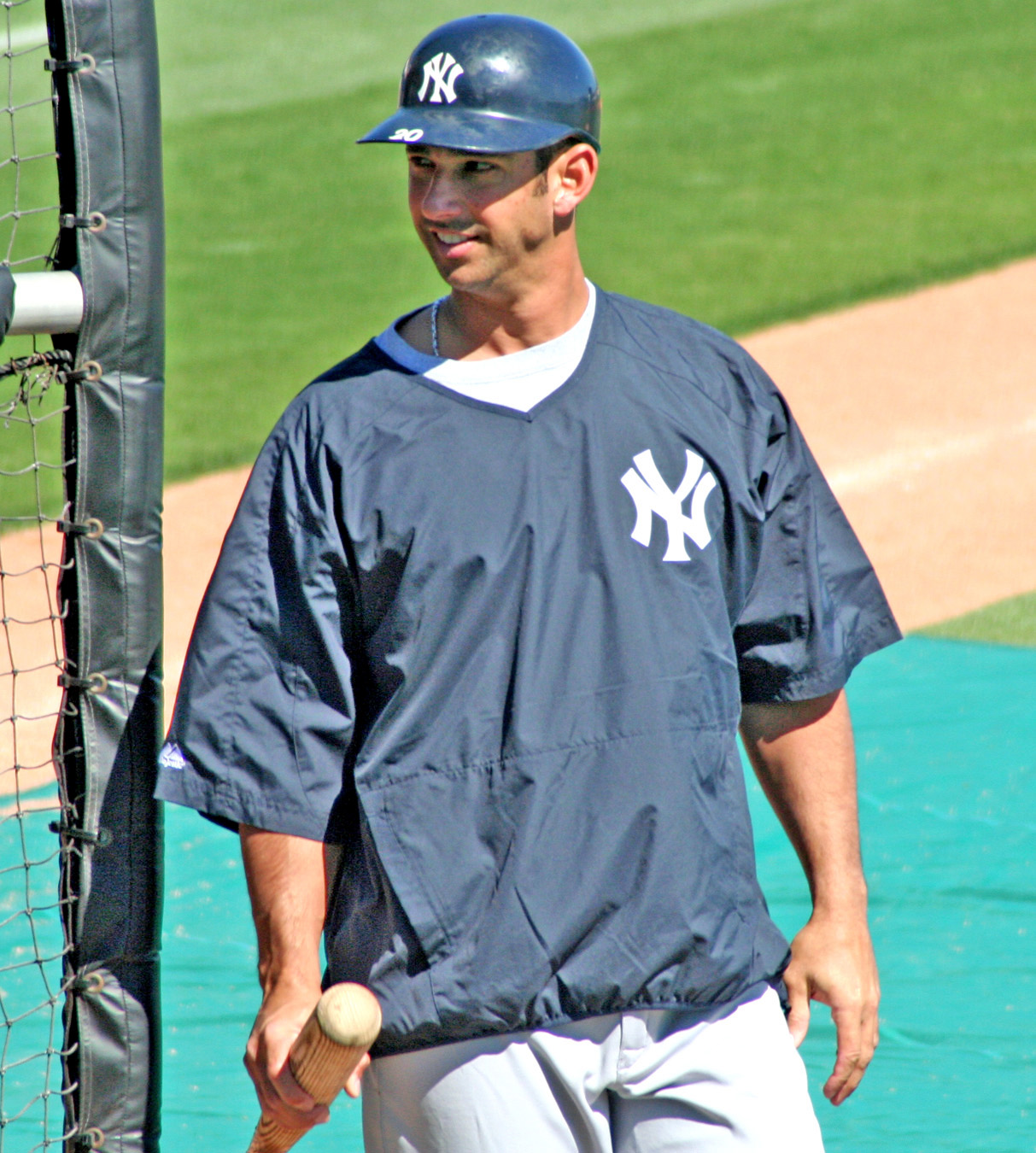
Posada during batting practice in 2007

Posada had a career year at the plate in 2007, batting .338, with 20 home runs, 90 RBIs, and career highs in hits (171) and doubles (42) during the 2007 season. He joined Iván Rodríguez as the only two catchers in MLB history to record at least 40 doubles in two separate seasons. He finished the season third in the AL in on-base percentage (.426), fourth in batting average, sixth in on-base plus slugging percentage (OPS) (.970), and eighth in doubles and slugging percentage (.543). He finished sixth in MVP voting for the season, and won his fifth Silver Slugger Award. Posada and Jason Kendall were the only catchers to catch at least 120 games per season from 2000 through 2007. Posada became a free agent after the 2007 season. He signed a four-year, $52 million contract to remain with the Yankees. Posada was represented in negotiations by Sam and Seth Levinson of ACES Inc.

In July 2008, Posada was placed on the disabled list (DL) for the first time in his career. Posada intended to recover from this injury in order to perform as designated hitter or first baseman. However, the team decided to acquire Xavier Nady in order to allow him enough time to operate. Posada underwent surgery to repair a glenoid labrum in his right shoulder and was placed on the DL for the remainder of the 2008 season. He batted .268 with three home runs and 22 RBIs in 51 games prior to the injury. During his absence, the Yankees finished with an 89–73 record, third place in AL East behind the wild-card winning Boston Red Sox. It was the first and only season the Yankees were eliminated from postseason contention during Posada's career.

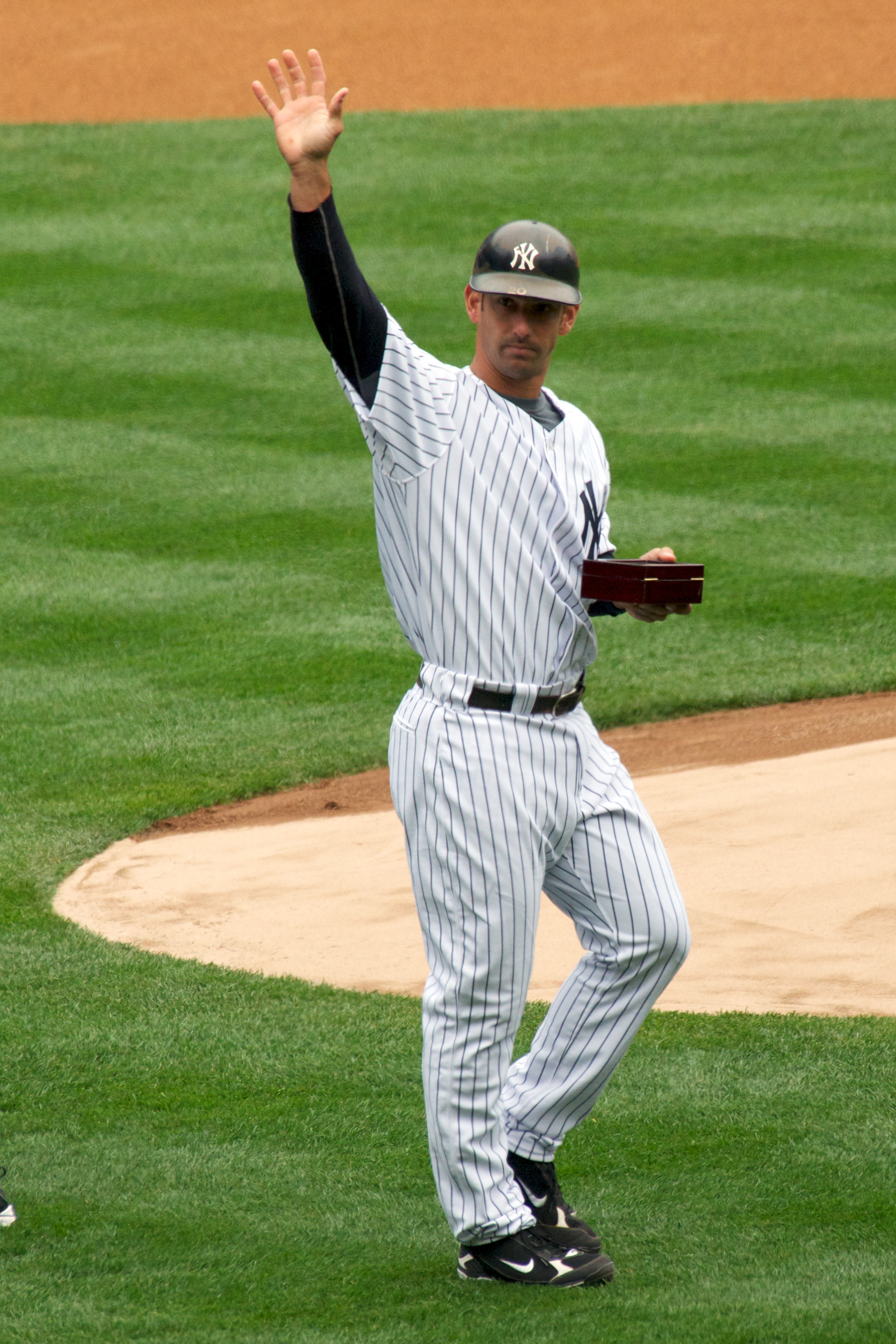
Posada receiving his championship ring from the 2009 World Series

Posada hit the first regular-season home run in the new Yankee Stadium on April 16, 2009, against Cliff Lee of the Cleveland Indians. During a game against the Toronto Blue Jays in September, Posada took exception to a pitch that was thrown behind him by Jesse Carlson. Posada walked and later scored on an RBI single by Brett Gardner. After Posada crossed home plate, he bumped into Carlson and was then ejected after taunting Carlson. Posada then charged at Carlson, igniting a bench-clearing brawl. Posada and Carlson were each suspended for three games for their roles in the brawl. Posada finished the 2009 season with a .285 batting average, 22 home runs, and 81 RBIs. During the 2009 postseason, Posada had a .276 batting average and two home runs. The Yankees won the 2009 World Series against the Philadelphia Phillies.

In an interleague series against the Houston Astros in June 2010, Posada became the first Yankee since Bill Dickey in 1937 to hit a grand slam in back-to-back games. In July, Posada recorded his 1,000th career RBI against the Kansas City Royals. Posada finished the 2010 year batting .248 with 18 home runs and 57 RBIs. The Yankees went into the postseason again but lost to the Texas Rangers in the 2010 ALCS.

==== 2011 ====
Following the 2010 season, Posada underwent arthroscopic surgery in his left knee to repair a torn meniscus. Posada was shifted to designated hitter and backup first baseman for the 2011 season due to his declining defensive performance, while Russell Martin became the new everyday catcher. After starting the 2011 season in a slump, Posada was moved to ninth in the batting order for a May game against the Boston Red Sox. Posada asked to be removed from the lineup. Posada told reporters that he needed time to "clear [his] head" and also mentioned some "stiffness" in his back as the reasons for his request.

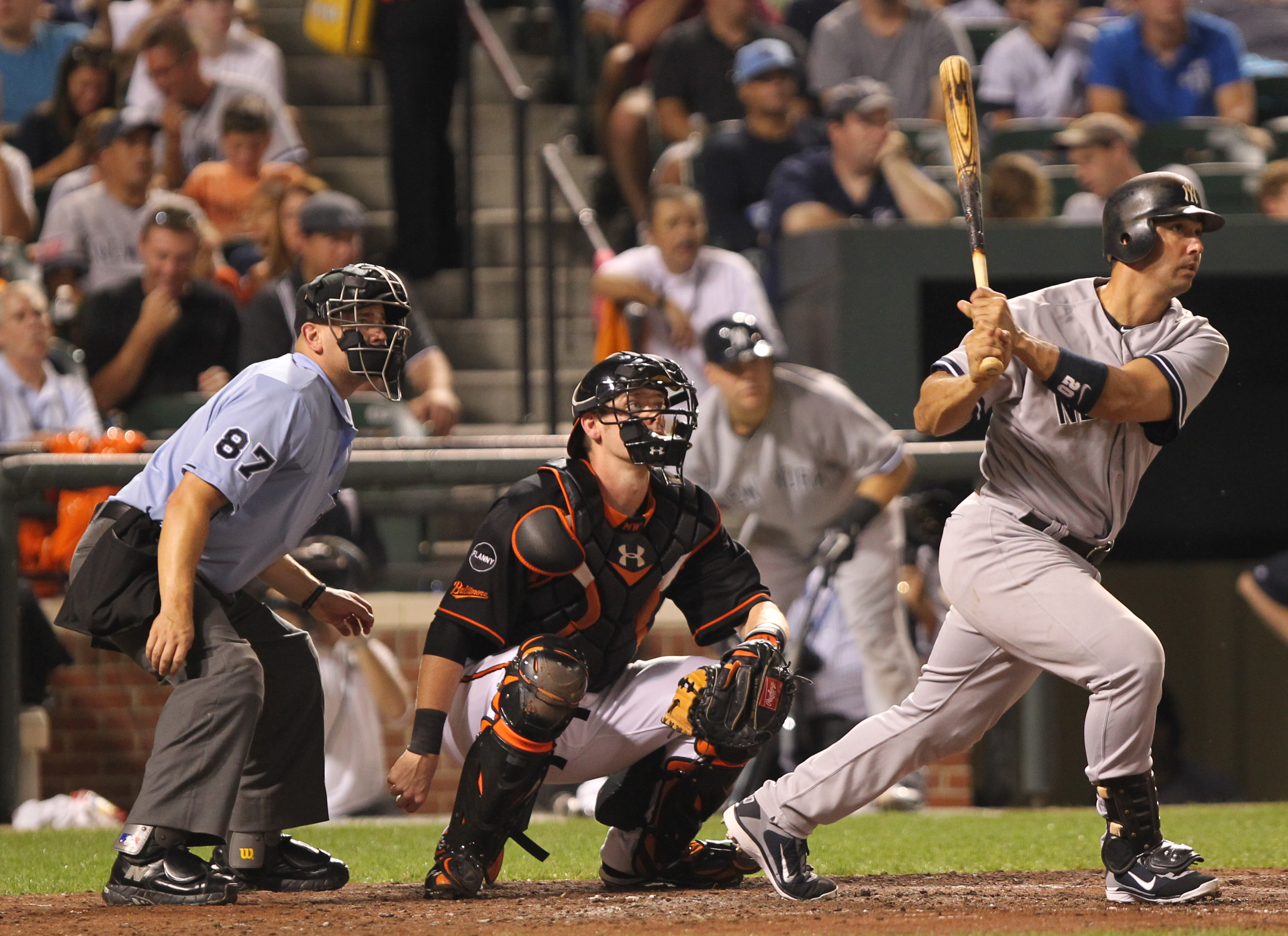
Posada during an at-bat in 2011, his final season

Posada hit .382 in June, but was removed from the everyday lineup in August due to his .230 season batting average. On August 13, his first start since being benched, in a game against the Tampa Bay Rays, Posada went 3-for-5 with a grand slam and six RBIs. His grand slam was the tenth of his career, moving him past Yogi Berra and Mickey Mantle for sixth place on the Yankees' all-time list. On August 25, he played second base for the first time in his major league career during the ninth inning of the Yankees' 22–9 victory over the Oakland Athletics; Posada recorded the final out by fielding a grounder. On September 10, Posada played as a catcher for the first time of the season due to injuries of Russell Martin and Francisco Cervelli. Posada finished the regular season with a .235 batting average, 14 home runs, and 44 RBIs.

In the 2011 ALDS, Posada recorded six hits, including a triple, four runs, and four walks in 14 at-bats as the starting DH, for a .429 batting average and a .579 on-base percentage. The Yankees lost the series to the Detroit Tigers in five games.

==== Retirement ====
When asked by reporters after the 2011 ALDS if he had considered that he might have played for the final time with the Yankees, Posada said, "I don't want to look at it like that. We lost, and we'll see what happens in the off-season." As the interview session went on, he eventually became emotional and left the clubhouse area to compose himself. Girardi said, "This guy, when you look at what he did in this series, he was awesome. He's had a tremendous career, and I'm sure he's going to continue to play, and I don't know what's going to happen." Girardi added, "But you talk about being proud of players—what he went through this year and what he gave us in the postseason, I don't think there's a prouder moment that I've had of Jorge."

After the 2011 season, Posada received interest from "five or six teams", but not the Yankees. He remained undecided on whether or not he wanted to keep playing. In January 2012, Posada decided to retire. The Yankees held a press conference officially announcing his retirement from baseball on January 24, 2012. He rejoined the Yankees as a guest instructor during spring training in 2013.

The Yankees retired Posada's jersey number 20 on August 22, 2015.

Posada became eligible for the National Baseball Hall of Fame in 2017, but he received only 3.8% of the vote and was dropped off the ballot.

In 2026, Posada told The New York Post that "I don't feel welcome" by the Yankees organization. "I don't feel like they want me there, so I don't go."

== Career statistics ==
=== Batting ===
Year	Team	G	PA	AB	R	H	2B	3B	HR	RBI	SB	CS	BB	SO	BA	OBP	SLG	OPS
1995	New York Yankees	1	0	0	0	0	0	0	0	0	0	0	0	0	—	—	—	—
1996	New York Yankees	8	15	14	1	1	0	0	0	0	0	0	1	6	.071	.133	.071	.205
1997	New York Yankees	60	224	188	29	47	12	0	6	25	1	2	30	33	.250	.359	.410	.768
1998	New York Yankees	111	409	358	56	96	23	0	17	63	0	1	47	92	.268	.350	.475	.824
1999	New York Yankees	112	437	379	50	93	19	2	12	57	1	0	53	91	.245	.341	.401	.742
2000	New York Yankees	151	624	505	92	145	35	1	28	86	2	2	107	151	.287	.417	.527	.943
2001	New York Yankees	138	557	484	59	134	28	1	22	95	2	6	62	132	.277	.363	.475	.838
2002	New York Yankees	143	598	511	79	137	40	1	20	99	1	0	81	143	.268	.370	.468	.837
2003	New York Yankees	142	588	481	83	135	24	0	30	101	2	4	93	110	.281	.405	.518	.922
2004	New York Yankees	137	547	449	72	122	31	0	21	81	1	3	88	92	.272	.400	.481	.881
2005	New York Yankees	142	546	474	67	124	23	0	19	71	1	0	66	94	.262	.352	.430	.782
2006	New York Yankees	143	545	465	65	129	27	2	23	93	3	0	64	97	.277	.374	.492	.867
2007	New York Yankees	144	589	506	91	171	42	1	20	90	2	0	74	98	.338	.426	.543	.970
2008	New York Yankees	51	195	168	18	45	13	1	3	22	0	0	24	38	.268	.364	.411	.775
2009	New York Yankees	111	438	383	55	109	25	0	22	81	1	0	48	101	.285	.363	.522	.885
2010	New York Yankees	120	451	383	49	95	23	1	18	57	3	1	59	99	.248	.357	.454	.811
2011	New York Yankees	115	387	344	34	81	14	0	14	44	0	2	39	76	.235	.315	.398	.714
MLB career (17 seasons)		1,829	7,150	6,092	900	1,664	379	10	275	1,065	20	21	936	1,453	.273	.374	.474	.848

== Personal life ==
Posada's mother is Dominican and his father, Jorge Posada Sr., is Cuban, but fled to Puerto Rico to escape Fidel Castro's regime. Posada Sr. worked as a scout for the Colorado Rockies.

Former major league pitcher Bruce Brubaker married Posada's mother's sister, Leda, making him Posada's uncle. Leo Posada, who played for the Kansas City Athletics in the early 1960s, is commonly believed to have been Jorge Posada's uncle. They did enjoy a close relationship and worked together on Jorge's game over the years. However, they were at most distant kin (Leo had just one sister; Jorge Sr. was not his brother).

Posada met Laura (née Mendez) at a party in 1997, soon recognizing her as the pitcher of the softball team in games he umpired. They were married on January 21, 2000. Laura, a former model and actress, works as an attorney. They have two children, Jorge Luis and Paulina. Derek Jeter served as best man at the wedding.

Posada's son, Jorge Luis, suffers from craniosynostosis, which he was diagnosed with 10 days after he was born. Posada established the Jorge Posada Foundation, which helps fund research and offers family support. Jorge released a charity wine in 2008 called Jorge Cabernet to raise funds for his foundation. In June 2011, his son underwent what Posada hoped would be the final surgery for the condition.

Posada wrote a children's book entitled Play Ball! that was published in 2006. He and his wife co-wrote Fit Home Team, a family health manual, and an autobiography titled The Beauty of Love: A Memoir of Miracles, Hope, and Healing, which describes their personal ordeals and how they dealt with them after learning of their son's birth condition in 1999.

After Hurricane Maria had devastated Puerto Rico in September 2017, Posada launched a relief fundraiser. St. Louis Cardinals catcher Yadier Molina and wife, Wanda, also started a GoFundMe campaign for victims of the hurricane on September 21, 2017. By December, the fund had raised over $500,000.

Posada is a dedicated Catholic.

== Bibliography ==
- Posada, Jorge; Colon, Raul; Burleigh, Robert (2006). Play Ball!. Simon & SchusterPaula Wiseman Books. ISBN 978-1-4169-0687-2.
- Posada, Jorge; Posada, Laura; Williams, Bernie (2009). Fit Home Team: The Posada Family Guide to Health, Exercise, and Nutrition the Inexpensive and Simple Way. Simon and Schuster. ISBN 9781439149614.
- Posada, Jorge; Posada, Laura; Haim, Monica; Torre, Joe (2010). The Beauty of Love: A Memoir of Miracles, Hope, and Healing. Simon and Schuster. ISBN 9781439103081.

== See also ==
- List of Major League Baseball career home run leaders
- List of Major League Baseball career putouts as a catcher leaders
- List of Major League Baseball career runs batted in leaders
- List of Major League Baseball players from Puerto Rico
- List of Major League Baseball players who spent their entire career with one franchise
- List of Puerto Ricans
- New York Yankees award winners and league leaders
