= 1999 World Series =

95th edition of Major League Baseball's championship series

Team (Wins)	Managers	Season
New York Yankees (4)	Joe Torre	98–64 (.605), GA: 4
Atlanta Braves (0)	Bobby Cox	103–59 (.636), GA: 6 1/2
- Dates: October 23–27
- Venue(s): Turner Field (Atlanta); Yankee Stadium (New York)
- MVP: Mariano Rivera (New York)
- Umpires: Randy Marsh (NL, crew chief), Rocky Roe (AL), Steve Rippley (NL), Derryl Cousins (AL), Gerry Davis (NL), Jim Joyce (AL)
- Hall of Famers: Yankees: Derek Jeter; Mariano Rivera; Joe Torre (manager); Braves: Bobby Cox (manager); John Schuerholz (GM); Tom Glavine; Andruw Jones; Chipper Jones; Greg Maddux; John Smoltz

Broadcast
- Television: NBC (United States); MLB International (International)
- TV announcers: Bob Costas and Joe Morgan (NBC); Gary Thorne and Ken Singleton (MLB International)
- Radio: ESPN; WABC (NYY); WSB (ATL)
- Radio announcers: Jon Miller and Rick Sutcliffe (ESPN); John Sterling and Michael Kay (WABC); Skip Caray, Pete Van Wieren, Don Sutton, and Joe Simpson (WSB)
- ALCS: New York Yankees over Boston Red Sox (4–1)
- NLCS: Atlanta Braves over New York Mets (4–2)

The 1999 World Series was the championship series of Major League Baseball's (MLB) 1999 season. The 95th edition of the World Series, it was a best-of-seven playoff between the defending American League (AL) and World Series champion New York Yankees and the National League (NL) champion Atlanta Braves in a rematch of the 1996 World Series, in which the Yankees prevailed. The Yankees swept the 1999 Series in four games for their second consecutive title, third in four years, and 25th overall, which made them the team with the most championship wins in North American sports, surpassing the NHL's Montreal Canadiens who won 24. It was the Yankees' third straight defeat of the Braves franchise in the Fall Classic (having beaten the Milwaukee Braves in the 1958 World Series in addition to their 1996 victory over the Atlanta Braves). Yankees closer Mariano Rivera was named the World Series Most Valuable Player. This was the second World Series after 1995 since the advent of the three-division era to feature both number-one seeds from the AL and NL, a phenomenon that has only occurred four times since: in 2013; 2020; 2024; and 2026.

The Yankees advanced to the World Series by defeating the Texas Rangers in the AL Division Series, three games to zero, and then the Boston Red Sox in the AL Championship Series, four games to one. The Braves advanced to the series by defeating the Houston Astros in the NL Division Series, three games to one, and then the New York Mets in the NL Championship Series, four games to two. The 1999 Series is remembered for Chad Curtis's walk-off home run in Game 3, which gave the Yankees a 6–5 victory, and Game 2's infamous interview of Pete Rose by Jim Gray on NBC.

== Background ==
This was the fourth World Series matchup between the Yankees and Braves (1957, 1958, 1996). It would also be the last World Series until 2013 in which the two teams with the best regular-season records in their respective leagues would face off. Perhaps most significantly, it was the first World Series ever in which the competing teams had played each other in the regular season. The Braves won two of three games over the Yankees at Yankee Stadium from July 15 to 17. Although interleague play had begun in 1997, neither of the two previous World Series saw a rematch from the regular season.

The 1999 World Series also feted the All-Century Team, featuring the greatest players of the 20th century as voted by both fans and sportswriters. One of the players on the All-Century Team, Yankees legend Joe DiMaggio, had died in March of that year, with the Yankees honoring him by wearing a black #5 on their sleeves.

== Summary ==
AL New York Yankees (4) vs. NL Atlanta Braves (0)

Game	Date	Score	Location	Time	Attendance
1	October 23	New York Yankees – 4, Atlanta Braves – 1	Turner Field	2:57	51,342
2	October 24	New York Yankees – 7, Atlanta Braves – 2	Turner Field	3:14	51,226
3	October 26	Atlanta Braves – 5, New York Yankees – 6 (10)	Yankee Stadium	3:16	56,794
4	October 27	Atlanta Braves – 1, New York Yankees – 4	Yankee Stadium	2:58	56,752

== Matchups ==
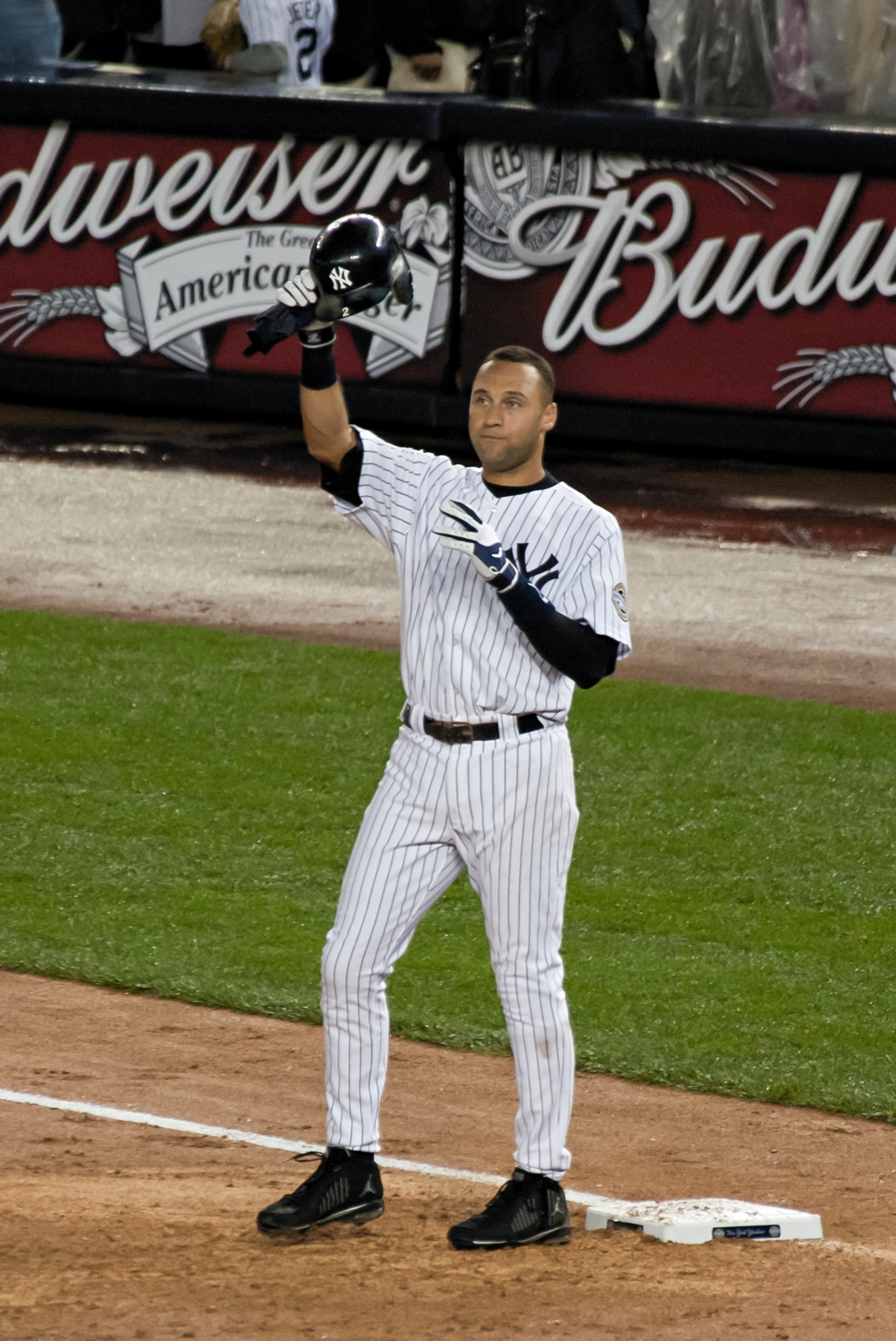
Derek Jeter's single in the eighth inning with the bases loaded tied the score up for the Yankees.

=== Game 1 ===
October 23, 1999 8:05 pm (EDT) at Turner Field in Atlanta, Georgia 51 °F (11 °C), clear
Team	1	2	3	4	5	6	7	8	9	R	H	E
New York	0	0	0	0	0	0	0	4	0	4	6	0
Atlanta	0	0	0	1	0	0	0	0	0	1	2	2
WP: Orlando Hernández (1–0) LP: Greg Maddux (0–1) Sv: Mariano Rivera (1); Home runs: NYY: None; ATL: Chipper Jones (1); Attendance: 51,342; Boxscore

The 1999 series opened with Greg Maddux facing Orlando Hernández in Game 1, becoming the latest a World Series has ever begun (October 23) beating the previous record by 2 days (1995 World Series, October 21). The Braves got on the board first in the series when Chipper Jones launched a home run down the right field line in the fourth inning. That would be the only hit that El Duque would allow through seven innings while striking out ten Atlanta batters. It would also be the only home run by the Braves in the series. Maddux had not originally been scheduled to start this game. Tom Glavine was the scheduled starter, but was scratched with a stomach virus the night before the game. Maddux—pitching on shorter rest than he was originally expected to have and with less than 24 hours' notice—had pitched scoreless three-hit ball through seven before tiring and running into major trouble in the eighth, which began when Scott Brosius singled for the third time in the game. Pinch hitter Darryl Strawberry walked and Chuck Knoblauch reached when Braves first baseman Brian Hunter mishandled his sacrifice bunt attempt. Maddux was still allowed to pitch to Derek Jeter, who stroked a single into left with the bases loaded driving in a run. With still nobody out and the bases juiced, Maddux was finally removed, but too late. Atlanta reliever John Rocker gave up a two-run single to Paul O'Neill through the right side making it 3–1 Yankees. Later in the inning, Rocker walked Jim Leyritz with the bases loaded to force home another run. All four runs were charged to Maddux, though two were unearned due to Hunter's error. Mariano Rivera picked up the save to wrap up the 4–1 victory.

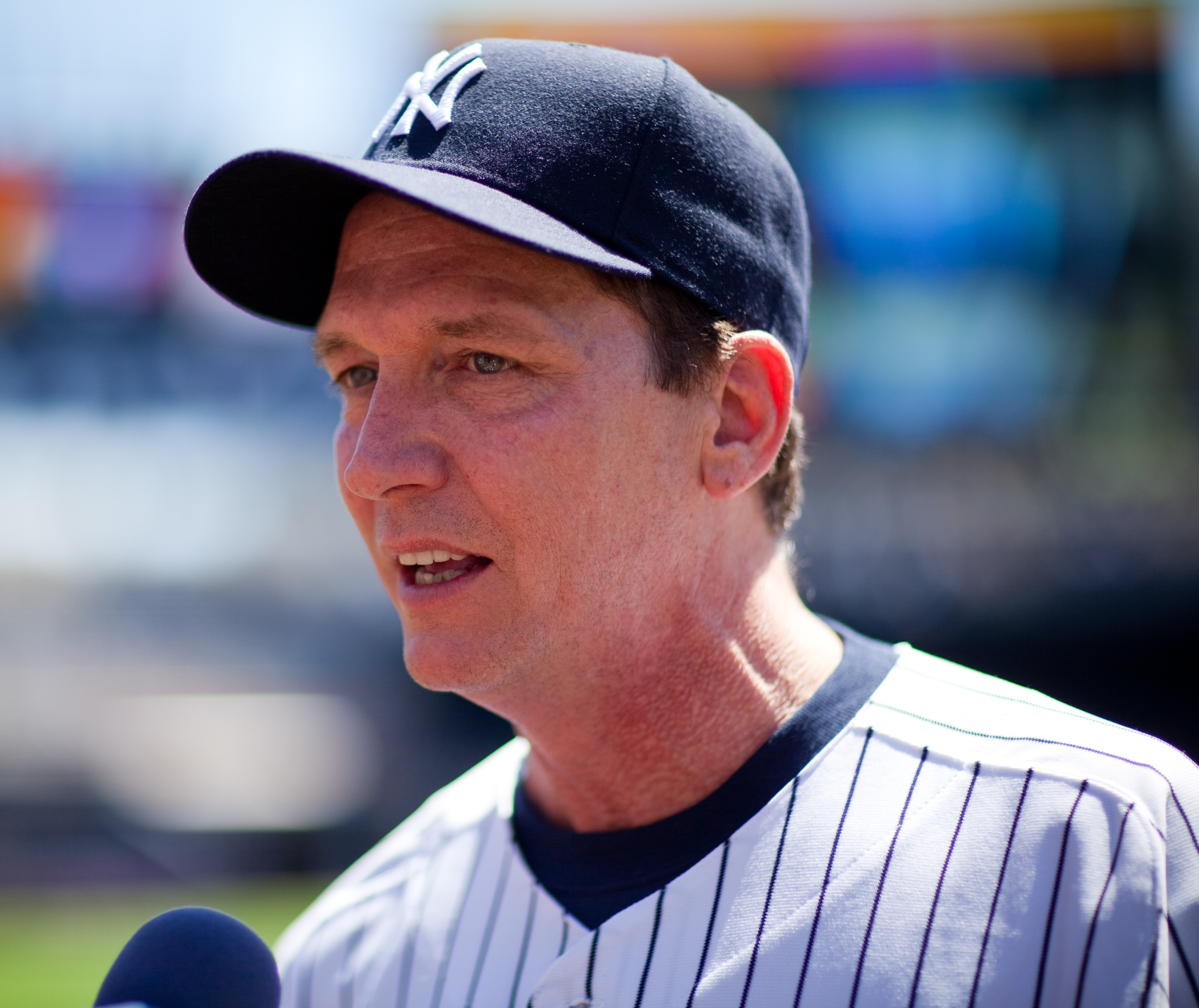
David Cone, the winning pitcher in Game 2.

=== Game 2 ===
October 24, 1999 8:05 pm (EDT) at Turner Field in Atlanta, Georgia 50 °F (10 °C), clear
Team	1	2	3	4	5	6	7	8	9	R	H	E
New York	3	0	2	1	1	0	0	0	0	7	14	1
Atlanta	0	0	0	0	0	0	0	0	2	2	5	1
WP: David Cone (1–0) LP: Kevin Millwood (0–1); Attendance: 51,226; Boxscore

Game 2 featured the presentation of the All-Century team and an explosion of Yankees runs off Atlanta starter Kevin Millwood. In the first inning, Knoblauch, Jeter, and O'Neill opened the game with singles with O'Neill driving in Knoblauch. After a double-play groundout, both Tino Martinez and Scott Brosius drove in a run with singles each to give the Yankees a 3–0 lead in the first. In the third, Bernie Williams and Martinez hit leadoff singles before the former scored on Ricky Ledee's double. Terry Mulholland relieved starter Kevin Millwood and after getting two outs, shortstop Ozzie Guillén's error on David Cone's ground ball allowed Martinez to score. The Yankees added to their lead off of Mulholland on Martinez's groundout that scored Jeter in the fourth, who led off the inning with a double, and Knoblauch's single in the fifth that scored Brosius, who also doubled to lead off the inning. Cone shutout the Braves for seven innings while Ramiro Mendoza pitched a scoreless eighth, but in the ninth inning, allowed a leadoff single to Chipper Jones. After a two-out walk, Jones scored on Greg Myers's single. Jeff Nelson relieved Mendoza and allowed an RBI double to Bret Boone before getting Otis Nixon to ground out to end the game and give the Yankees a 2-0 series lead. This was the last victory of a World Series Game 2 on the road until the Texas Rangers won Game 2 of the 2011 World Series in St. Louis, and the last time the road team won the first two games of the World Series until 2019 when the Washington Nationals accomplished the feat against the Houston Astros.

Golfer Payne Stewart, a good friend of Braves third baseman Chipper Jones, died between Games 2 and 3. Yankees right fielder Paul O'Neill's father died a few hours before Game 4.

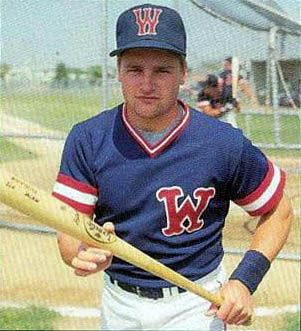
Chuck Knoblauch hit a game-tying two-run home run in the eighth inning for the Yankees.

=== Game 3 ===
October 26, 1999 8:20 pm (EDT) at Yankee Stadium in Bronx, New York 63 °F (17 °C), mostly cloudy
Team	1	2	3	4	5	6	7	8	9	10	R	H	E
Atlanta	1	0	3	1	0	0	0	0	0	0	5	14	1
New York	1	0	0	0	1	0	1	2	0	1	6	9	0
WP: Mariano Rivera (1–0) LP: Mike Remlinger (0–1); Home runs: ATL: None; NYY: Chad Curtis 2 (2), Tino Martinez (1), Chuck Knoblauch (1); Attendance: 56,794; Boxscore

Game 3 in New York matched up lefties Andy Pettitte and Tom Glavine, who had been scheduled to start Game 1 but was scratched and moved back to Game 3 due to a stomach virus. Pettitte was rocked early. Bret Boone drove in Gerald Williams with a RBI double in the first. The Yankees tied the game in bottom of the inning on Paul O'Neill's RBI single, but in the third, Brian Jordan had an RBI single scoring Boone, and Jose Hernandez doubled in Jordan and Andruw Jones. In the fourth inning, Bret Boone doubled in Gerald Williams for a second time in the game to make the score 5–1. He then was called out trying to steal third. Replays appeared to show that he slid in just ahead of the tag, and this call likely cost the Braves a run, as Chipper Jones doubled two pitches later. Glavine was sharp through seven innings but gave up homers to Tino Martinez in the fifth and Chad Curtis in the 7th, trimming the Braves lead to 5–3. The Yankees bullpen was solid, holding the Braves scoreless after Pettitte left the game. For the second time in three games, manager Bobby Cox made the decision to count on a tiring starter to hold a lead in the 8th inning despite having a solid middle-relief core that had proven extremely reliable at holding late-inning leads throughout the season, and a closer who sometimes pitched two innings. Instead, Glavine surrendered a two-run homer to Knoblauch to tie up the game at 5–5. Video of serious conversation in the dugout the previous inning made clear that there had been significant question as to whether to leave Glavine in for that inning. Glavine later explained that, while he had only thrown 72 pitches, he felt like his body was tiring coming off the illness that sidelined him from his scheduled Game 1 start, and felt hesitant to go back out but said he would try for one more inning when there was continued indecision on the matter. Glavine would be replaced by John Rocker, but again too late. Rocker shut out the Yankees until he was relieved after the ninth. The score remained knotted until the bottom of the tenth when Chad Curtis blasted a walk-off home run—his second home run of the game—off Mike Remlinger, giving the Yankees a commanding 3–0 lead in the Series.

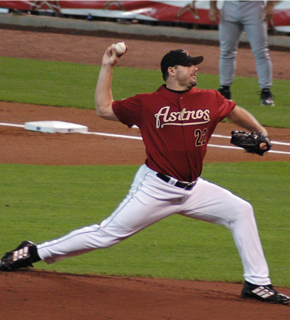
Roger Clemens' strong pitching effort in Game 4 allowed New York to sweep the World Series for a second straight year.

=== Game 4 ===
October 27, 1999 8:20 pm (EDT) at Yankee Stadium in Bronx, New York 51 °F (11 °C), mostly clear
Team	1	2	3	4	5	6	7	8	9	R	H	E
Atlanta	0	0	0	0	0	0	0	1	0	1	5	0
New York	0	0	3	0	0	0	0	1	X	4	8	0
WP: Roger Clemens (1–0) LP: John Smoltz (0–1) Sv: Mariano Rivera (2); Home runs: ATL: None; NYY: Jim Leyritz (1); Attendance: 56,752; Boxscore

Game 4 featured the presentation of the Roberto Clemente Award to Tony Gwynn, followed by a battle of hard-throwing Cy Young Award winners, Roger Clemens and John Smoltz. In the third inning, the Yanks broke through when Tino Martinez singled off Ryan Klesko's foot with the bases loaded, driving in two runs. Jorge Posada followed with another RBI single, making the score 3–0. Clemens, seeking his first World Series victory, was outstanding, the only Braves scoring coming in the eighth when Boone singled in Walt Weiss. Jim Leyritz added another Yankees run with a shot in the eighth, adding to his legacy as a great postseason performer and as one of the thorns in the side of Braves fans. Rivera, who was named Series MVP, got Keith Lockhart to fly out to LF Curtis for the final out of the season. To date, Rivera is the last full time relief pitcher to win the World Series Most Valuable Player.

The 1999 New York Yankees became the first team to win the World Series in consecutive sweeps since the 1938–1939 Yankees. It was the first sweep by a team without home-field advantage since 1966 when Baltimore swept the Dodgers. The Yankees' 11–1 postseason record was the best ever in the wild card era, which was later tied by the Chicago White Sox in 2005 (the 1976 Reds finished a perfect 7–0 in the postseason, which preceded the permanent introduction of the wild card and Division Series). The Yankees players were each paid $326,000 for this World Championship.

With the Yankees' sweep of the Braves, this was the second time in 1999 that a New York City team had swept a team from Atlanta out of a playoffs; the Knicks had swept the Hawks in the second round of the NBA Playoffs during their Cinderella run to the NBA Finals, where they lost to the San Antonio Spurs. It would also mark the final time the Yankees clinched the championship at the old Yankee Stadium.

The powerhouse Braves batted just .200 in the 4-game Series. Despite this, John Smoltz later referred to this series as "the closest four-game sweep you could ever have," given the fact that even with their anemic offensive showing, the Braves were still quite possibly two more prudent decisions on bullpen use away from a 2–1 lead after the first three games, with two starters blowing 8th inning leads when in both cases there had been very clearly visible situational red flags about their fitness to be left in the games that long.

With the Game 4 victory, the Yankees claimed their record-breaking 25th World Championship in North American professional sports, surpassing the previous record of 24 set by the National Hockey League (NHL)'s Montreal Canadiens.

== Composite box ==
1999 World Series (4–0): New York Yankees (A.L.) beat Atlanta Braves (N.L.).

Team	1	2	3	4	5	6	7	8	9	10	R	H	E
New York Yankees	4	0	5	1	2	0	1	7	0	1	21	37	1
Atlanta Braves	1	0	3	2	0	0	0	1	2	0	9	26	4
Total attendance: 216,114 Average attendance: 54,029; Winning player's share: $307,809 Losing player's share: $203,542

== Aftermath ==
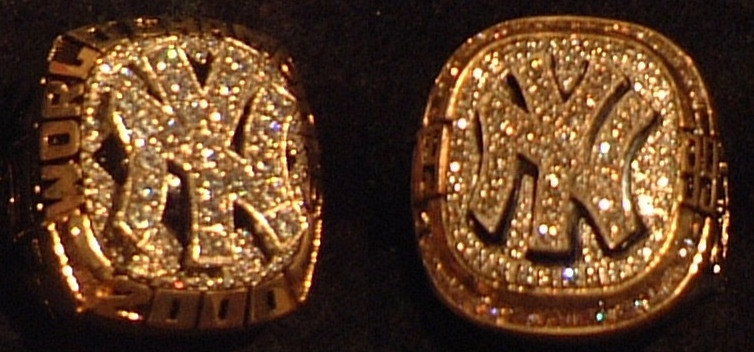
Yankees' 1999–2000 World Series rings

This series win brought the Yankees' championship total to 25, surpassing the NHL’s Montreal Canadiens (who won 24 championships) to become the team with the most championship wins in North American sports, a status they still hold today.

This was the fifth and final World Series appearance in the 1990s for Atlanta, but the new decade would not be as favorable to them, the closest they got to returning to the World Series in the Bobby Cox era was in the 2001 NLCS where they lost to the eventual world champion Diamondbacks in five games (Cox stepped down as manager after the 2010 season). In total, the Braves went to the World Series five times under Cox in a nine season span and won the World Series once. Atlanta would reach the NLCS again in 2020 where they fell to eventual world champion Los Angeles Dodgers in 7 games after leading the series 3–1. The Braves would get their revenge on the Dodgers the next year by beating them in 6 games. The 1999 World Series was the Braves' last Fall Classic until 2021, where they won in 6 games over the Houston Astros. This series marked the only time that Turner Field hosted World Series games.

The Yankees would continue their dynasty by defeating the New York Mets in the next year's World Series. They won a fourth straight pennant in 2001, but lost to the Arizona Diamondbacks in that season's World Series. They would reach the World Series again in 2003 (losing to the Florida Marlins), 2009 (defeating the defending champions, the Philadelphia Phillies) and 2024 (losing to the Los Angeles Dodgers).

This was the final World Series the Yankees clinched the title at the original Yankee Stadium. They claimed the 2009 World Series in the new Yankee Stadium next door.

On October 11, 2005, A&E Home Video released the New York Yankees Fall Classic Collectors Edition (1996–2001) DVD set. Game 3 of the 1999 World Series is included in the set.

== Media coverage ==
This was NBC's 39th and most recent World Series telecast to date, as Fox aired the next World Series as part of the contract in place, and acquired the exclusive broadcast rights of Major League Baseball beginning in 2001. Bob Costas provided play-by-play while Joe Morgan served as analyst for the series. Hannah Storm served as pre-game host with then Cincinnati Reds shortstop Barry Larkin serving as the analyst. The field reporters were Jim Gray (Yankees dugout) and Craig Sager (Braves dugout) on loan from Turner Sports.

With the Knicks having played in the NBA Finals in June, this was the second championship series in 1999 that NBC broadcast involving teams from New York City. Bob Costas, Jim Gray, and Hannah Storm were involved both times: Costas with play-by-play, Gray as a reporter, and Storm as pre-game host. This was the most recent year that a city hosted both the NBA Finals and the World Series in the same year, until Cleveland did so in 2016.

Once again, ESPN Radio provided coverage of the World Series. Play-by-play man Jon Miller was joined in the booth by Rick Sutcliffe, who substituted for the unavailable Joe Morgan.

== See also ==
- 1999 Japan Series
