= Ricky Ledée =

Puerto Rican baseball player (born 1973)

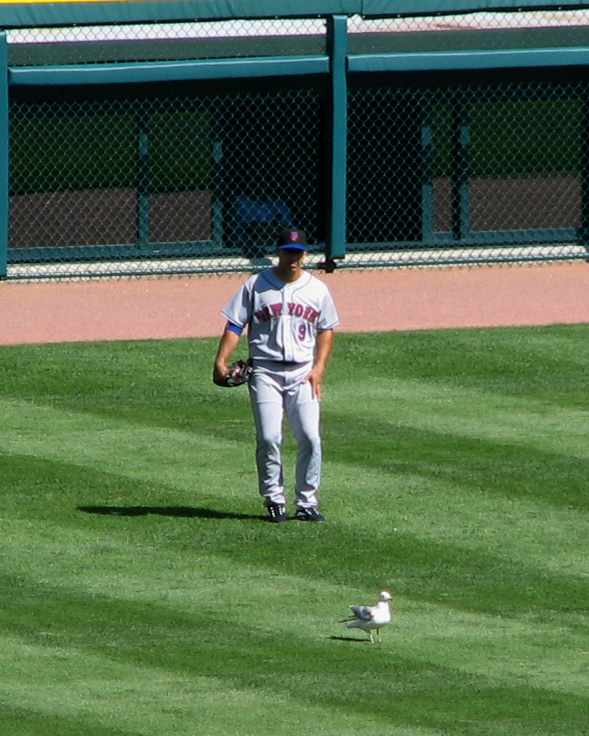
- Ledée with the New York Mets in 2007
- Outfielder
- Born: November 22, 1973 (age 52); Ponce, Puerto Rico
- Batted: Left Threw: Left

MLB debut
- June 14, 1998, for the New York Yankees

Last MLB appearance
- July 7, 2007, for the New York Mets

MLB statistics
- Batting average: .243
- Home runs: 63
- Runs batted in: 318
- Stats at Baseball Reference

Teams
- New York Yankees (1998–2000); Cleveland Indians (2000); Texas Rangers (2000–2001); Philadelphia Phillies (2002–2004); San Francisco Giants (2004); Los Angeles Dodgers (2005–2006); New York Mets (2006–2007)

Career highlights and awards
- 2× World Series champion (1998, 1999)

Ricardo Alberto Ledée (born November 22, 1973) is a Puerto Rican professional baseball outfielder who played in Major League Baseball for the New York Yankees, Cleveland Indians, Texas Rangers, Philadelphia Phillies, San Francisco Giants, Los Angeles Dodgers, and New York Mets from 1998 to 2007. He won two World Series championships with the Yankees in 1998 and 1999.

== Professional career ==
The New York Yankees selected Ledée in the 16th round of the 1990 Major League Baseball draft. He made his major league debut with the Yankees on June 14, 1998. Ledée played in 42 games with the Yankees that season. Ledee reached base in eight consecutive plate appearances in the 1998 World Series, batting 6-for-10 with three doubles and four runs batted in in the series. He was also a part of the Yankees' championship team winning the 1999 World Series.

In 2000, Ledée was batting only .241 for the Yankees when they traded him and two players to be named to the Cleveland Indians in exchange for David Justice. Ledée played just 17 games for the Indians before they traded him to the Texas Rangers for first baseman David Segui. He finished the 2000 season with the Rangers and was a reserve for the club in 2001. He signed with the Philadelphia Phillies in 2002.

On July 30, 2004, the Phillies traded Ledée with Alfredo Simón to the San Francisco Giants for Félix Rodríguez. He signed a two-year contract worth $2.5 million with the Los Angeles Dodgers before the 2005 season, and was claimed off of waivers by the New York Mets on August 8, 2006.

Ledée signed a minor league contract with the Oakland Athletics on February 2, 2007, and was invited to their spring training camp, but was released March 25. The Mets signed him to another minor league contract March 31. He was a starting outfielder for their triple-A, Pacific Coast League affiliate, New Orleans Zephyrs, when they recalled him to the Major League roster June 8. On July 8, he was designated for assignment.

Ledée retired from baseball on August 21, 2007.

== Personal life ==
Ledée's late father, Toñito Ledée, was the lead singer of Papo Lucca's band, La Sonora Ponceña. Ledée appeared in For Love of the Game as a member of the New York Yankees named Ruiz.

Ledée has three children.
