= Jeff Nelson (pitcher) =

American baseball pitcher (born 1966)

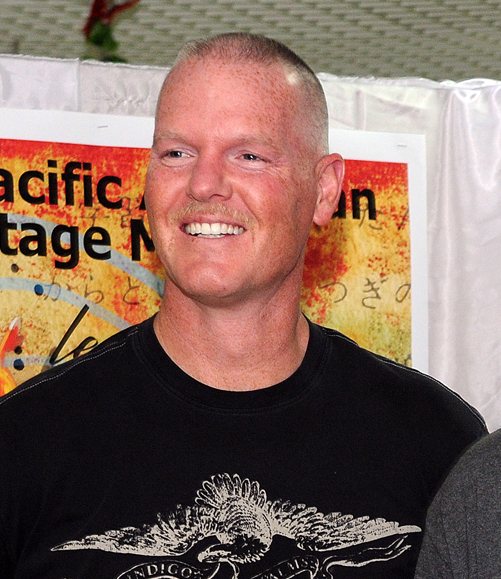
- Pitcher
- Born: November 17, 1966 (age 59); Baltimore, Maryland, U.S.
- Batted: Right Threw: Right

MLB debut
- April 16, 1992, for the Seattle Mariners

Last MLB appearance
- June 2, 2006, for the Chicago White Sox

Career statistics
- Win–loss record: 48–45
- Earned run average: 3.41
- Strikeouts: 829
- Stats at Baseball Reference

Teams
- Seattle Mariners (1992–1995); New York Yankees (1996–2000); Seattle Mariners (2001–2003); New York Yankees (2003); Texas Rangers (2004); Seattle Mariners (2005); Chicago White Sox (2006)

Career highlights and awards
- All-Star (2001); 4× World Series champion (1996, 1998–2000)

Jeffrey Allan Nelson (born November 17, 1966) is an American sports broadcaster and former baseball relief pitcher who played 15 years in Major League Baseball (MLB). He had two stints with the New York Yankees, with whom he won four World Series championships.

Nelson had three stints with the Seattle Mariners (1992–1995, 2001–2003 and again in 2005). He was named an All-Star in 2001. He is Seattle's all-time record holder for most games pitched (383).

Nelson pitched in 798 MLB games with a 48–45 win–loss record, and with runners in scoring position and two outs, he held batters to a .191 batting average against. In 55 postseason games (fourth all time), he compiled a 2–3 record with 62 strikeouts and a 2.65 earned run average in 54 1/3 innings.

Nelson is currently a color commentator for the Miami Marlins.

== Early life and career ==
Nelson grew up in Maryland and played baseball and basketball at Catonsville High School.

Drafted by the Los Angeles Dodgers in the 22nd round of the 1984 MLB draft, he signed on June 21, 1984. In 1986, he was selected by the Seattle Mariners in the minor league phase of the Rule 5 draft.

== Major league career ==
Nelson made his major league debut with the Mariners on April 16, 1992, against the Chicago White Sox at Comiskey Park. He pitched two scoreless innings of relief.

On July 13, 1995, Nelson entered a game against the Toronto Blue Jays with two runners on base and no outs. He threw one pitch to Sandy Martínez and induced a ground ball triple play. He became the first pitcher in the era for which pitch count data is available to throw only one pitch in an outing and be credited with pitching a full inning. Nelson made his first postseason appearance in 1995, as the Mariners defeated the New York Yankees in the American League Division Series before losing in the American League Championship Series.

In December 1995, the Mariners traded Nelson, Tino Martinez, and Jim Mecir to the Yankees for Russ Davis and Sterling Hitchcock. With the Yankees, Nelson was a member of the World Series champions in 1996, 1998, 1999, and 2000.

Nelson returned to Seattle as a free agent in 2001. In that season he made the American League All-Star team. Nelson's All-Star selection was considered an innovative move by AL manager Joe Torre, as Nelson's role of middle relief was traditionally overlooked during All-Star selection.

From 2001 to 2003, he formed the right side of Seattle's potent lefty/righty setup squad along with left-handed pitcher Arthur Rhodes. In 2001, Nelson held opposing batters to a .136 batting average and a .199 slugging percentage, and .074/.110 once he had two strikes on them.

On August 6, 2003, the Mariners traded Nelson to the Yankees for Armando Benitez. The Yankees lost to the Florida Marlins in the World Series.

In 2004, Nelson appeared in 29 games for the Texas Rangers, going 1–2 with a 5.32 ERA. He was on the disabled list twice with an assortment of injuries to his right knee and right elbow.

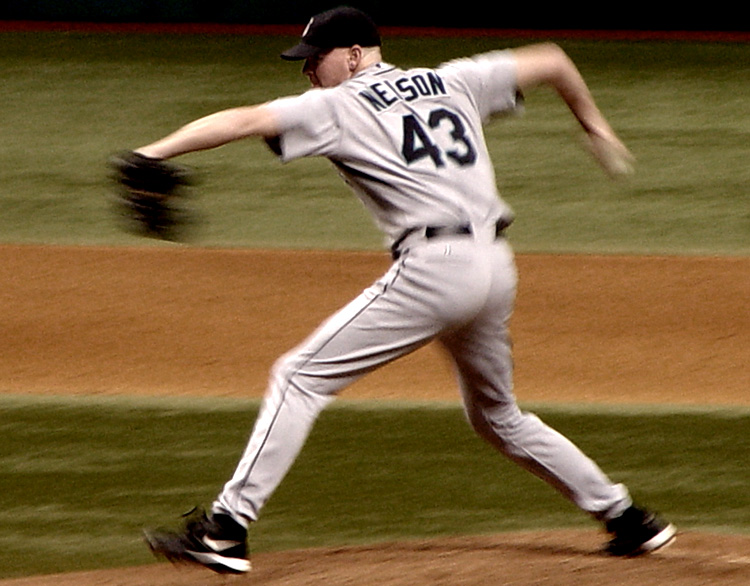
Nelson pitching for the Mariners in 2005

Before the 2005 season, the Mariners signed Nelson to a minor league contract, his third stint with the club.

In the 2006 offseason, Nelson signed a minor-league contract with the St. Louis Cardinals, but was released before the season began. He was then picked up by the White Sox.

=== Surgery ===
On June 8, 2006, Nelson announced that he would undergo surgery, to relieve a nerve in his right elbow, that was likely to mark the end of Nelson's active baseball career. Following the operation on his pitching elbow, on May 10, 2007, there was controversy when he tried to sell bone chips from his elbow, removed in the operation, on eBay who cancelled the auction. Nelson, whose daughters attended The Bear Creek School, were going to give half the proceeds to the school and half to the Curtis Williams Foundation.

Nelson signed a minor league contract with the Yankees in January 2007 so that he could officially retire as a Yankee.

== Pitching style ==
Nelson was a respected slider specialist, much more effective against right-handed batters than against lefties (who batted 55 points higher, and slugged 106 points higher, against him than did righties). He was also known for his three-quarters sidearm delivery, and threw a cut 90-mile per hour fastball as well. During his Yankees tenure, he was known for faking a throw to third base and then throwing to first base in an attempt to pick off the baserunner. Until the rule was changed in 2013, making a fake throw to third base a balk, this was referred to as "the old Jeff Nelson" by Yankees play-by-play broadcaster Michael Kay.

Among hitters whom he dominated most were Troy Glaus, who in 14 at-bats was hitless with 11 strikeouts.

== Broadcasting ==
Nelson has filled in on sports radio KJR-AM in Seattle and also worked as an analyst for MLB.com during the 2010 postseason.

In 2016, Nelson joined Fox Sports' pre-game broadcast team for Miami Marlins. In 2019, Nelson served as a studio and game analyst for the YES Network, calling occasional games for his former team. In 2021, he substituted for Suzyn Waldman on WFAN broadcasts of the final games of the Yankees regular season in October 2022, working with John Sterling. He became a Marlins television announcer in 2022 and also is a radio announcer for the team.

Nelson left the YES Network after the 2025 season. He was then selected to announce more Marlins games.
