= Scott Brosius =

American baseball player (born 1966)

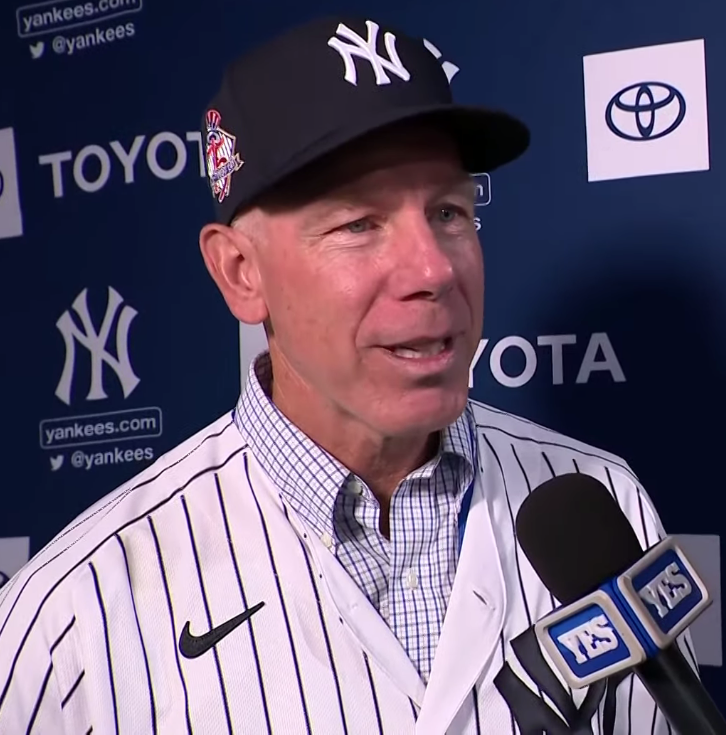
- Brosius in 2023
- Third baseman
- Born: August 15, 1966 (age 60); Hillsboro, Oregon, U.S.
- Batted: Right Threw: Right

MLB debut
- August 7, 1991, for the Oakland Athletics

Last MLB appearance
- October 6, 2001, for the New York Yankees

MLB statistics
- Batting average: .257
- Home runs: 141
- Runs batted in: 531
- Stats at Baseball Reference

Teams
- As player: Oakland Athletics (1991–1997); New York Yankees (1998–2001); As coach: Seattle Mariners (2017–2018)

Career highlights and awards
- All-Star (1998); 3× World Series champion (1998–2000); World Series MVP (1998); Gold Glove Award (1999)

Scott David Brosius (born August 15, 1966) is an American former professional baseball third baseman for the Oakland Athletics (1991–1997) and the New York Yankees (1998–2001) of Major League Baseball (MLB) who is the athletic director at Linfield University. He was an MLB All-Star in 1998 and won a Gold Glove Award in 1999. Brosius was a member of three consecutive World Series champions with the Yankees from 1998 to 2000 and won the World Series Most Valuable Player Award in 1998.

== Early life ==
Brosius grew up in Milwaukie, Oregon, where he attended Rex Putnam High School before going to Linfield College. He was drafted by the Oakland Athletics in the 20th round of the 1987 amateur draft and signed on June 9, 1987.

== Playing career ==
=== Oakland Athletics (1991–1997) ===
Brosius became one of the few players to hit a home run in his first major league game, on August 7, 1991. Brosius was the A's starting third baseman through the mid-1990s, although he played almost 300 games in his Oakland career at other positions, primarily in the outfield. In 1996, he batted .304 with 22 home runs, his best year with Oakland; however, his performance declined in 1997 when he finished last in the majors (of those who qualified for the batting title) in batting average, on-base percentage, and slugging average.

=== New York Yankees (1998–2001) ===
After the 1997 season, the Athletics traded Brosius to the New York Yankees for Kenny Rogers. In his first season with the Yankees, Brosius batted .300 with 19 home runs and 98 RBIs. That season, he was selected to his only career All-Star Game. He hit .471 with two homers and six runs batted during the 1998 World Series and won the World Series Most Valuable Player Award. He hit 2 home runs in Game 3 of the World Series, including one off Padres closer Trevor Hoffman to give the Yankees a 5–3 lead in the 8th inning which helped to propel the Yankees to a 3–0 Series lead.

Although his performance over the next three years did not match that of his 1998 season, he remained a perennial fan favorite in the Bronx as his workmanlike blue-collar approach and serviceable durability appealed to fans, teammates, and management alike. During his career with the Yankees, they won the American League pennant every year, from 1998 to 2001, as well as the World Series from 1998 to 2000. He won a Gold Glove in 1999. On July 18 of that year, against the Montreal Expos, Brosius caught shortstop Orlando Cabrera's foul popup for the final out of David Cone's perfect game.

In one of the most dramatic, clutch moments of his career, Brosius hit a two-out, two-run home run in the bottom of the ninth inning of Game 5 of the 2001 World Series against the Arizona Diamondbacks to tie the game and set up an extra-innings Yankees win. The previous night, New York first baseman Tino Martinez had hit a two-out, two-run home run to tie the game in the ninth inning as well. It marked the first time in World Series history this had ever occurred. The Yankees would go on to lose Games 6 and 7 of the series, after which Brosius retired.

== Coaching and management career ==
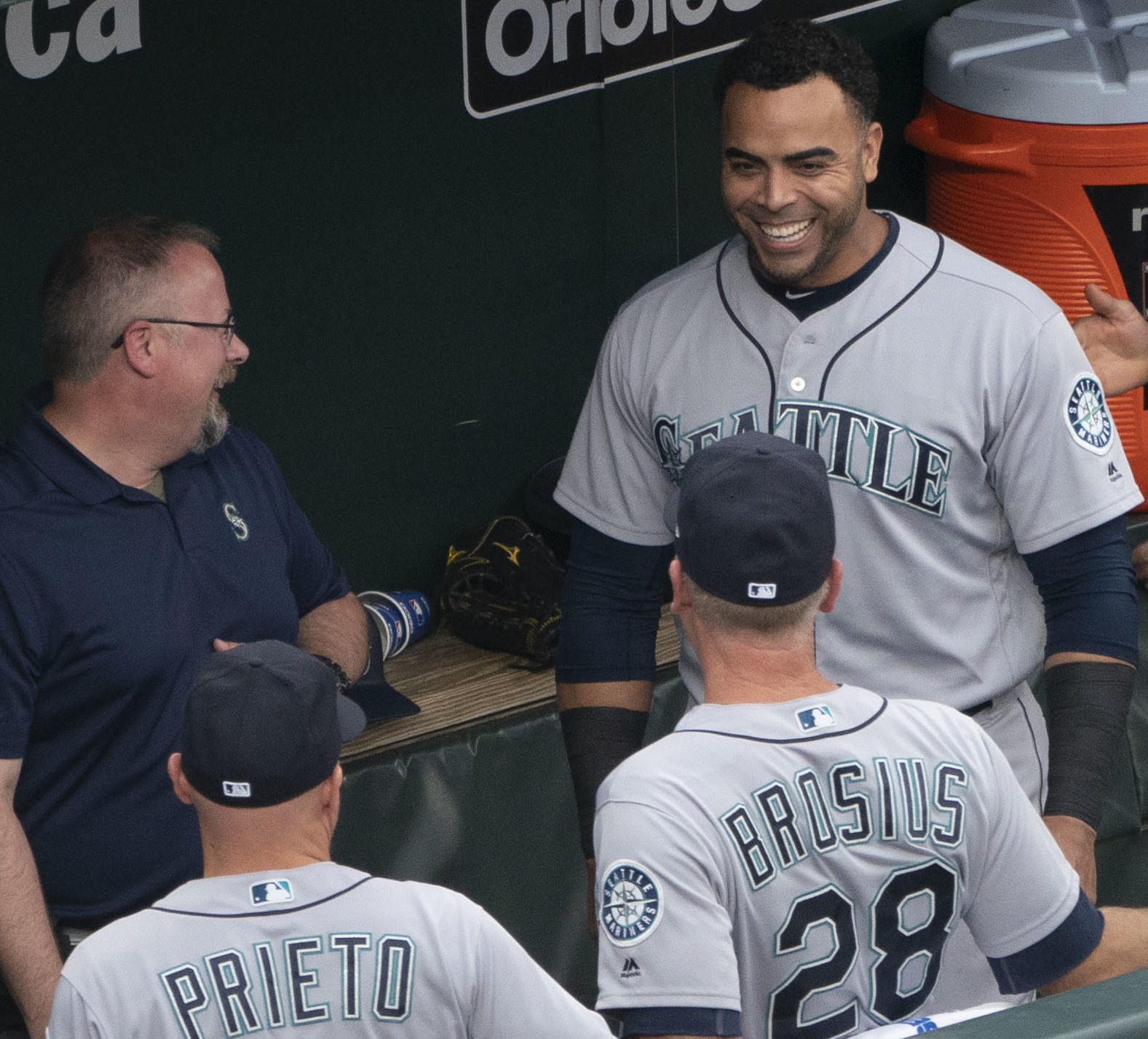
Brosius (foreground, right) as a coach with the Seattle Mariners in 2018

From 2002 to 2007, Brosius was an assistant coach at Linfield College under head baseball coach Scott Carnahan, Brosius's coach when he played for the school. They switched roles for the 2008 season. Brosius was named head coach and Carnahan, who also is athletic director, became an assistant coach. Brosius earned his degree from Linfield in 2002. Brosius has been named Northwest Conference coach of the year five times (2008, 2010, 2011, 2013, 2014) in eight seasons as head coach and led the team into the NCAA Division III national championship tournament four times. The Wildcats finished third in 2010 and in 2013 won Linfield's first NCAA national baseball championship (and second national championship, after the 1971 NAIA victory.) Trying for a rare repeat in 2014, they were eliminated in two straight games. Brosius' win–loss record in eight years as Linfield head coach was 270–96 (.738).

On December 4, 2015, the Seattle Mariners announced that Brosius would be the new hitting coach for their AAA affiliate, the Tacoma Rainiers. He was promoted on October 20, 2016 to assistant coach of Seattle Mariners for the 2017 season. Brosius was named the Mariners third base coach for the 2018 season.

On August 13, 2019, he became the United States national baseball team coach at the 2019 WBSC Premier12. On October 16, 2019, he was promoted to manager when Joe Girardi declined the position. The team finished fourth in the tournament and failed to qualify for the 2020 Olympics in the initial rounds.

Brosius became the athletic director at Linfield University in May 2024.

== Legacy ==
Brosius was inducted into the Linfield Athletics Hall of Fame in 2002, and the Oregon Sports Hall of Fame in 2005.

In 2007 and 2015, Brosius took part in the New York Yankees Old-Timers' Day festivities.

On November 4, 2009, Brosius threw out the first pitch before Game 6 of the 2009 World Series at Yankee Stadium.

Sporting positions
| Preceded by Manny Acta | Seattle Mariners Third Base Coach; 2017–2018 | Succeeded by Chris Prieto |
