= Tino Martinez =

American baseball player (born 1967)

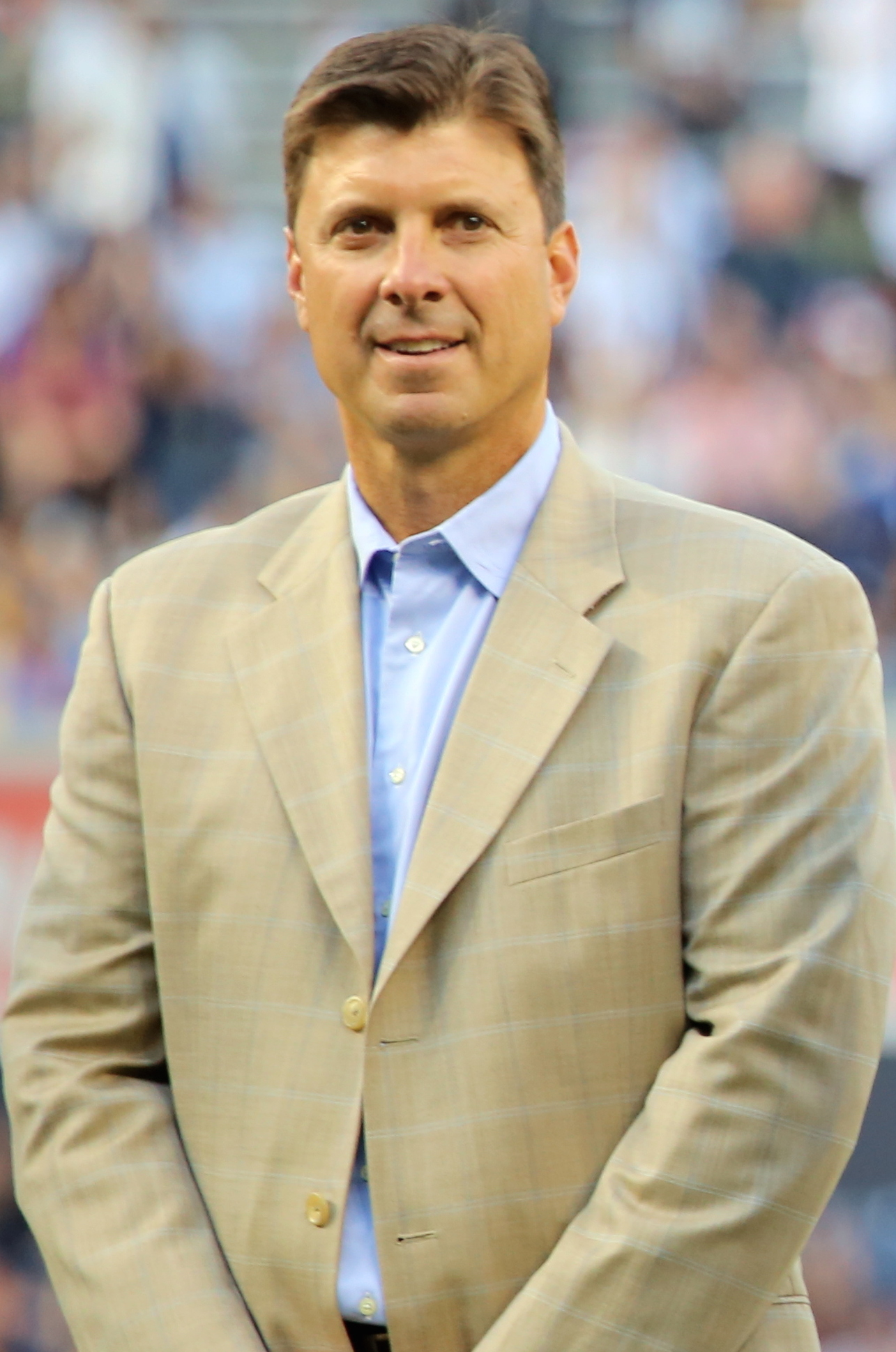
- Martinez in 2015
- First baseman
- Born: December 7, 1967 (age 58); Tampa, Florida, U.S.
- Batted: Left Threw: Right

MLB debut
- August 20, 1990, for the Seattle Mariners

Last MLB appearance
- October 1, 2005, for the New York Yankees

MLB statistics
- Batting average: .271
- Home runs: 339
- Runs batted in: 1,271
- Stats at Baseball Reference

Teams
- As player: Seattle Mariners (1990–1995); New York Yankees (1996–2001); St. Louis Cardinals (2002–2003); Tampa Bay Devil Rays (2004); New York Yankees (2005); As coach: Miami Marlins (2013)

Career highlights and awards
- 2× All-Star (1995, 1997); 4× World Series champion (1996, 1998–2000); Silver Slugger Award (1997); Monument Park honoree
Medals
Men's baseball
Representing United States
Summer Olympics
Gold medal – first place	1988 Seoul	Team
Pan American Games
Silver medal – second place	1987 Indianapolis	Team
Baseball World Cup
Silver medal – second place	1988 Rome	Team
Coach for United States
World Baseball Classic
Gold medal – first place	2017 Los Angeles	Team

Constantino "Tino" Martinez (born December 7, 1967) is an American former professional baseball player. He played in Major League Baseball (MLB) for the Seattle Mariners, New York Yankees, St. Louis Cardinals, and Tampa Bay Devil Rays from 1990 through 2005. He also served as a hitting coach for the Miami Marlins in 2013. He was also nicknamed "The Bam-tino" after his home run in Game 1 of the 1998 World Series. Formerly a third baseman, Martinez was the first round draft pick for the Seattle Mariners in 1988 out of the University of Tampa, where he starred during his time on campus. During his 16-year MLB career, he scored 1,009 runs, drove in 1,271 runs, and hit 339 home runs. He had 100 or more RBI in six different seasons and was twice named to the All-Star team.

== Early life ==
Tino Martinez was born and raised in the neighborhood of West Tampa in Tampa, Florida, to a Cuban-American father with Spanish roots and a mother with Italian and Greek ancestry. His grandfather owned a small cigar factory, in which Martinez and his brothers, as well as childhood friend and fellow future major-leaguer Luis Gonzalez, worked as young boys. Martinez attended St. Joseph School in West Tampa until 8th grade, then attended Tampa Catholic High School for 9th and 10th grades, before transferring to and graduating from Jefferson High School. Martinez led both of his high schools to state baseball championships. With Tampa Catholic, he had future Major Leaguers Lance McCullers and Rich Monteleone as teammates.

Martinez enrolled at the University of Tampa, where he played college baseball for the Tampa Spartans in NCAA Division II. He played three years for Tampa, and was an All-American each year. In 1986, he played collegiate summer baseball with the Falmouth Commodores of the Cape Cod Baseball League and was named a league all-star. As of 2011, Martinez still held school records in career home runs (54), career batting average (.399), career slugging percentage (.736), single season batting average (.452) and single season slugging percentage (.957). In 1988, he was a finalist for the Golden Spikes Award, which has never been given to any NCAA Division II player. One year after graduating he was inducted into the University of Tampa's athletics hall of fame. Since 2010, the Tino Martinez Award has been given to the most outstanding NCAA Division II baseball player. In 2013, Martinez was inducted into the National College Baseball Hall of Fame.

== Playing career ==
=== Seattle Mariners (1990–1995) ===
The Seattle Mariners drafted Martinez in 1988. Martinez's first Major League manager was Lou Piniella, who had also grown up in the West Tampa neighborhood, and who knew Martinez's uncle and mother. Martinez had several mediocre seasons, but broke out in 1995 when he drove in 111 runs, hit 31 home runs and batted .293. The Mariners clinched the AL West and went on to play in the first season of divisional postseason play against the New York Yankees.

=== New York Yankees (1996–2001) ===
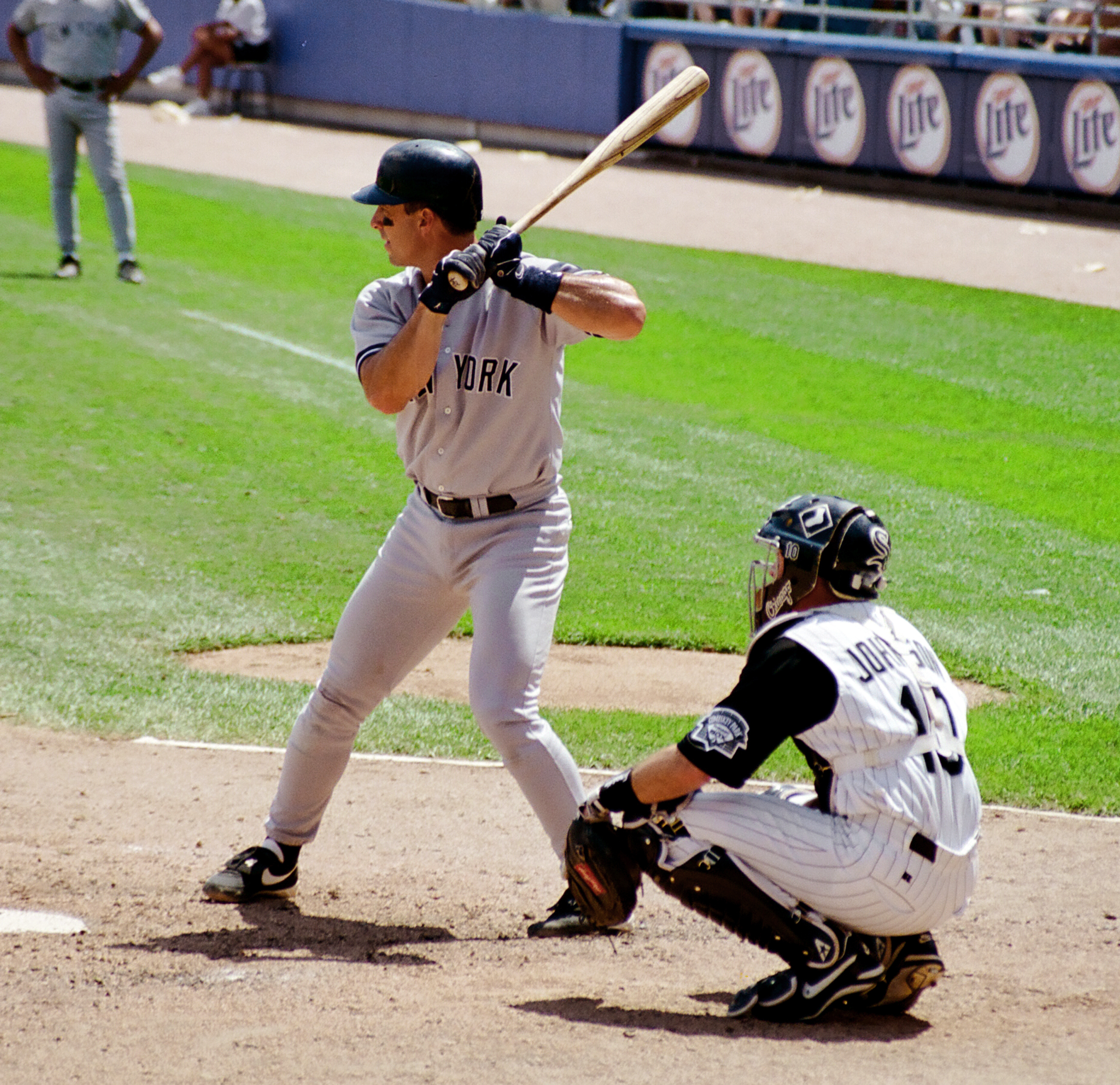
Martinez in 1999

Following that season, the New York Yankees acquired Martinez, along with Jeff Nelson and Jim Mecir, for Sterling Hitchcock and Russ Davis. Before the trade was finalized, Martinez and the Yankees agreed to a five-year, $20.25 million contract extension. Martinez succeeded Don Mattingly as the Yankees' starting first baseman.

Martinez was with the New York Yankees as they won four World Series championships in five seasons: 1996, 1998, 1999, and 2000. He also won the Home Run Derby in 1997. Martinez hit two memorable home runs as a Yankee in the World Series. The first came off Mark Langston in Game 1 of the 1998 Series. The Yankees had tied the game earlier in the inning with a Chuck Knoblauch three-run home run. The following three batters got on base, and Martinez came to the plate. After taking a very close pitch with a 2–2 count, which appeared to be strike three but was not ruled as such by umpire Rich Garcia, Martinez hit the next pitch into the upper deck for a grand slam, giving the Yankees a four-run lead. Martinez's second memorable World Series home run came three years later, on October 31, 2001. The Yankees were down to their last out trailing by two runs, two outs in the 9th inning, when Martinez came to the plate with a runner on. He hit a game-tying home run to right center off Arizona Diamondbacks closer Byung-hyun Kim, and the Yankees went on to win the game. The feat was repeated the following night by Scott Brosius. However, the Yankees would lose Games 6 and 7 and thus the Series.

His best season statistically came in 1997, when he was second in the American League in home runs and RBI (with 44 and 141 respectively), and finished second in AL Most Valuable Player voting. On May 19, 1998, he was hit by a pitch in the upper back by Baltimore Orioles pitcher Armando Benítez, which resulted in an intense brawl between the two teams.

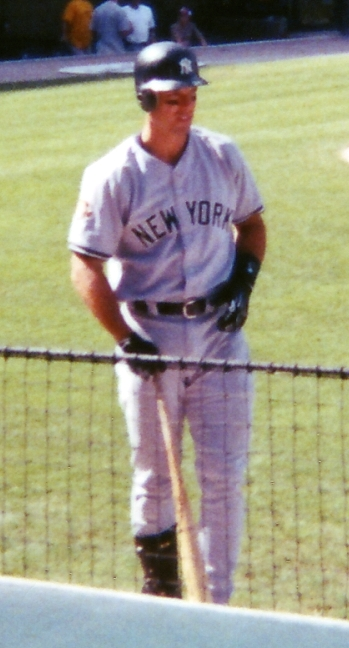
Martinez in the on-deck circle at Edison Field on August 25, 2001

In the 2001 World Series, Martinez's Yankees faced off against the Arizona Diamondbacks. The series went to Game 7, which Arizona won when Luis Gonzalez, Martinez's best friend, hit a game-winning single off Yankee closer Mariano Rivera in the bottom of the 9th inning. Gonzalez later recalled that when he went back home to check his answering machine, the first message of congratulations was from Martinez.

During most of his time with the Yankees, Martinez resided in Tenafly, New Jersey.

=== St. Louis Cardinals (2002–2003) ===
After the 2001 season the Yankees elected to sign Jason Giambi for 2002 and beyond. Martinez went on to play for the St. Louis Cardinals for two seasons, once again replacing an aging, legendary first baseman, Mark McGwire.

When Martinez returned to Yankee Stadium during a series in 2003, he received a standing ovation by Yankee fans. In the second game of the three game series, Martinez hit two home runs off former teammate Andy Pettitte, receiving a substantial ovation from the crowd both times. The Yankee fans cheered him for a curtain call, a rare occurrence in honor of a visiting team's player.

=== Tampa Bay Devil Rays (2004) ===
After the 2003 season, the Cardinals decided to have Albert Pujols switch from left field to first base. They traded Martinez to the Tampa Bay Devil Rays, where he was reunited with his manager in Seattle, Lou Piniella, who was now managing the Devil Rays. Martinez hit 23 home runs, while serving as a mentor for the team's many young players, and was popular with Devil Rays' fans. His family lived just minutes from Tropicana Field.

Prior to the 2004 Summer Olympics, the host nation, Greece, trying to build up their chances of winning a medal, decided to put together a team of North American baseball players of Greek heritage. Martinez, having some Greek ancestry, was approached by the Greek Olympic team manager, Rob Derksen, and asked to play for the host nation. Martinez, along with fellow MLB players Eric Karros and Aaron Miles, declined the offer because the games were in the midst of the Major League Baseball season.

=== Second stint with the New York Yankees (2005) ===
Martinez returned for a second tour of duty with the Yankees for the 2005 season. From May 7–11, 2005, Martinez hit five home runs in five straight games, which is one more than his previous best, set from June 27 – July 31, 2001. Held homer-less on May 12, 2005, Martinez hit two homers on May 15 to give him eight home runs in eight games.

On November 8, 2005, the Yankees declined their $3 million option on Martinez, making him a free agent.

On Wednesday February 15, 2006, he officially decided to end his playing career. Martinez confirmed the decision in the St. Petersburg Times, telling the paper that he would begin his broadcasting career at ESPN. Martinez said that the offer from ESPN made his decision to retire a lot easier, as he would work on Baseball Tonight, do some radio work, and broadcast a few games.

In his 16-year Major League career, Martinez hit .271 with 339 home runs and 1,271 RBI. During his seven years with the Yankees, he hit 192 home runs and drove in 739 runs.

=== 1988 Olympics ===
Martinez, along with other future Major Leaguers Jim Abbott and Robin Ventura, won a gold medal at the 1988 Summer Olympics in Seoul, South Korea, the seventh time that baseball was part of the Olympic Games and its last year as a demonstration sport. In the final game, Martinez belted two homers and drove in four runs, and Abbott pitched a complete game, as they led the USA to a 5–3 win.

== Coaching and broadcasting ==
In 2008, Martinez agreed to be a special instructor for the Yankees to help their first basemen with defensive skills. After Spring training, he was named Special Assistant to the General Manager.

Starting in Spring training 2010, Martinez became a color commentator for the YES Network, replacing the departed David Cone. He made his regular season debut on April 9, 2010, when he called a game between the Yankees and the Rays that was coincidentally played back in his home area of Tampa Bay.

Martinez was named the hitting coach for the Miami Marlins for the 2013 season, replacing Eduardo Pérez. On July 28, 2013, Martinez resigned from the position amid allegations of physically abusing Derek Dietrich several months before the resignation. Martinez's behavior in the clubhouse was reported to include verbal attacks towards the Marlins' Justin Ruggiano and Chris Valaika, along with minor league player Matt Downs.

In 2023, Martinez returned to the Cape Cod Baseball League as assistant coach of the Hyannis Harbor Hawks.

== Life outside Major League Baseball ==
Martinez has been married to Marie Prado since 1991. They have three children: Olivia, Tino, Jr. (TJ), and Victoria. The family currently resides in West Tampa.

The premiere of Yankeeography: Tino Martinez appeared in early May 2006, on the YES Network. On April 2, 2007, Martinez received the 2007 Pride of The Yankees Award at the New York Yankees Homecoming Banquet.

In 2008, during the final season of the old Yankee Stadium, Martinez participated in his first Old Timers' Day. In a Yankees vs. Orioles preseason game on March 14, 2010, it was mentioned by Yankees play-by-play announcer, Michael Kay, that Martinez is a fan of the Tampa Bay Buccaneers.

Martinez also participates annually in the Derek Jeter Celebrity Invitational (DJCI) golf tournament in Tampa.

Martinez, who left the University of Tampa after his junior year to pursue professional baseball, received a bachelor's degree at UT in liberal studies on May 7, 2011.

Martinez participated in the Yankees' 2011 Old Timers' Day on June 26, 2011. He has returned several more times. The Yankees honored Martinez with a plaque in Monument Park on June 21, 2014. Martinez was also present at a ceremony when former teammate Derek Jeter had his number 2 retired on May 14, 2017.

Since October 2019, Martinez has worked in commercial real estate in the Tampa area.

== See also ==
- List of Major League Baseball career assists as a first baseman leaders
- List of Major League Baseball career double plays as a first baseman leaders
- List of Major League Baseball career home run leaders
- List of Major League Baseball career runs scored leaders
- List of Major League Baseball career runs batted in leaders
- List of Olympic Games gold medalists who won World Series
- List of Olympic medalists in baseball
- List of people from Tampa, Florida
- New York Yankees award winners and league leaders
