= 1998 Oakland Athletics season =

1998 Oakland Athletics
- League: American League
- Division: West
- Ballpark: Network Associates Coliseum
- City: Oakland, California
- Record: 74–88 (.457)
- Divisional place: 4th
- Owners: Stephen Schott; Ken Hofmann
- General managers: Billy Beane
- Managers: Art Howe
- Television: KRON-TV; Fox Sports Bay Area (Ray Fosse, Greg Papa, Ken Wilson)
- Radio: KNEW (Bill King, Ken Korach, Ray Fosse)

The 1998 Oakland Athletics season was the 98th season for the Oakland Athletics franchise, all as members of the American League, and their 31st season in Oakland. The Athletics finished the season with a record of 74 wins and 88 losses. The campaign was the first of the Billy Beane era. While the Athletics finished a distant fourth in the American League West, they improved upon the prior year's dismal output of 65–97.

The strong play of Jason Giambi, Matt Stairs and Kenny Rogers highlighted an otherwise forgettable campaign. Rogers' performance was particularly impressive; in arguably the finest season of his career, he won 16 games and posted a 3.17 earned run average (both were the best full-season marks by an Athletics starter since 1992). Additionally, the 1998 season marked Rickey Henderson's fourth (and final) stint with the Athletics. Henderson, at the age of 39, stole a total 66 bases; this total led the league in that category. Lastly, rookie Ben Grieve collected a Rookie of the Year (ROY) award for his solid debut season. The award was the Athletics' first since Walt Weiss received one in 1988.

The Athletics posted a winning record in 1999. The organization, under Beane, would not post another losing season until 2007.

== Offseason ==
- October 29, 1997: Dane Johnson was selected off waivers from the Athletics by the Toronto Blue Jays.
- November 7, 1997: The Athletics traded a player to be named later to the New York Yankees for Kenny Rogers and cash. The Athletics completed the deal by sending Scott Brosius to the Yankees on November 18.
- November 18, 1997: Tony Batista was drafted from the Athletics by the Arizona Diamondbacks as the 27th pick in the 1997 MLB expansion draft.
- November 26, 1997: David Newhan and Don Wengert were traded by the Athletics to the San Diego Padres for Jorge Velandia and Doug Bochtler.
- November 22, 1997: Damon Berryhill was signed as a free agent by the Athletics.
- December 4, 1997: Mark Acre was purchased from the Athletics by the Yakult Swallows.
- December 5, 1997: Jack Voigt was signed as a free agent by the Athletics.
- December 16, 1997: Mike Blowers was signed as a free agent by the Athletics.
- December 22, 1997: Izzy Molina was signed as a free agent by the Athletics.
- January 22, 1998: Rickey Henderson was signed as a free agent by the Athletics.
- March 9, 1998: Kevin Mitchell was signed as a free agent by the Athletics.
- March 17, 1998: Ernie Young was purchased from the Athletics by the Kansas City Royals.
- March 25, 1998: Doug Bochtler was purchased from the Athletics by the Detroit Tigers.

== Regular season ==
=== Opening Day starters ===
- Rafael Bournigal
- Tom Candiotti
- Jason Giambi
- Ben Grieve
- Rickey Henderson
- A. J. Hinch
- Dave Magadan
- Jason McDonald
- Scott Spiezio
- Matt Stairs

=== Season standings ===
AL West
| Team | W | L | Pct. | GB | Home | Road |
|---|---|---|---|---|---|---|
| Texas Rangers | 88 | 74 | .543 | — | 48‍–‍33 | 40‍–‍41 |
| Anaheim Angels | 85 | 77 | .525 | 3 | 42‍–‍39 | 43‍–‍38 |
| Seattle Mariners | 76 | 85 | .472 | 11½ | 42‍–‍39 | 34‍–‍46 |
| Oakland Athletics | 74 | 88 | .457 | 14 | 39‍–‍42 | 35‍–‍46 |

=== Record vs. opponents ===
1998 American League record Source: MLB Standings Grid – 1998
| Team | ANA | BAL | BOS | CWS | CLE | DET | KC | MIN | NYY | OAK | SEA | TB | TEX | TOR | NL |
|---|---|---|---|---|---|---|---|---|---|---|---|---|---|---|---|
| Anaheim | — | 5–6 | 6–5 | 5–6 | 4–7 | 8–3 | 6–5 | 6–5 | 6–5 | 5–7 | 9–3 | 6–5 | 5–7 | 4–7 | 10–6 |
| Baltimore | 6–5 | — | 6–6 | 2–9 | 5–6 | 10–1 | 5–6 | 7–3 | 3–9 | 8–3 | 6–5 | 5–7 | 6–5 | 5–7 | 5–11 |
| Boston | 5–6 | 6–6 | — | 5–6 | 8–3 | 5–5 | 8–3 | 5–6 | 5–7 | 9–2 | 7–4 | 9–3 | 6–5 | 5–7 | 9–7 |
| Chicago | 6–5 | 9–2 | 6–5 | — | 6–6 | 6–6 | 8–4 | 6–6 | 4–7 | 4–7 | 4–7 | 5–6 | 5–6 | 4–6–1 | 7–9 |
| Cleveland | 7–4 | 6–5 | 3–8 | 6–6 | — | 9–3 | 8–4 | 6–6 | 4–7 | 3–8 | 9–2 | 7–3 | 4–7 | 7–4 | 10–6 |
| Detroit | 3–8 | 1–10 | 5–5 | 6–6 | 3–9 | — | 6–6 | 8–4 | 3–8 | 7–4 | 3–8 | 5–6 | 3–8 | 5–6 | 7–9 |
| Kansas City | 5–6 | 6–5 | 3–8 | 4–8 | 4–8 | 6–6 | — | 7–5 | 0–10 | 7–4 | 4–6 | 8–3 | 3–8 | 6–5 | 9–7 |
| Minnesota | 5–6 | 3–7 | 6–5 | 6–6 | 6–6 | 4–8 | 5–7 | — | 4–7 | 4–7 | 2–9 | 7–4 | 7–4 | 4–7 | 7–9 |
| New York | 5–6 | 9–3 | 7–5 | 7–4 | 7–4 | 8–3 | 10–0 | 7–4 | — | 8–3 | 8–3 | 11–1 | 8–3 | 6–6 | 13–3 |
| Oakland | 7–5 | 3–8 | 2–9 | 7–4 | 8–3 | 4–7 | 4–7 | 7–4 | 3–8 | — | 5–7 | 5–6 | 6–6 | 5–6 | 8–8 |
| Seattle | 3–9 | 5–6 | 4–7 | 7–4 | 2–9 | 8–3 | 6–4 | 9–2 | 3–8 | 7–5 | — | 6–5 | 5–7 | 4–7 | 7–9 |
| Tampa Bay | 5–6 | 7–5 | 3–9 | 6–5 | 3–7 | 6–5 | 3–8 | 4–7 | 1–11 | 6–5 | 5–6 | — | 4–7 | 5–7 | 5–11 |
| Texas | 7–5 | 5–6 | 5–6 | 6–5 | 7–4 | 8–3 | 8–3 | 4–7 | 3–8 | 6–6 | 7–5 | 7–4 | — | 7–4 | 8–8 |
| Toronto | 7–4 | 7–5 | 7–5 | 6–4–1 | 4–7 | 6–5 | 5–6 | 7–4 | 6–6 | 6–5 | 7–4 | 7–5 | 4–7 | — | 9–7 |

=== Notable transactions ===
- June 2, 1998: 1998 Major League Baseball draft
  - Mark Mulder was drafted by the Athletics in the 1st round (2nd pick). Player signed October 9, 1998.
  - Eric Byrnes was drafted by the Athletics in the 8th round. Player signed June 12, 1998.
- June 26, 1998: Aaron Small was selected off waivers from the Athletics by the Arizona Diamondbacks.
- August 7, 1998: Kevin Mitchell was released by the Athletics.
- August 9, 1998: Jack Voigt was acquired from the Athletics by the Texas Rangers in a conditional deal.

=== Roster ===
1998 Oakland Athletics
Roster
| Pitchers: 49 Tom Candiotti; 56 Steve Connelly; 41 Jim Dougherty; 36 Mike Fetters; 29 Buddy Groom; 51 Jimmy Haynes; 31 Gil Heredia; 28 Mark Holzemer; 33 T.J. Mathews; 32 Mike Mohler; 44 Mike Oquist; 48 Ariel Prieto; 37 Kenny Rogers; 30 Aaron Small; 59 Blake Stein; 22 Billy Taylor; 50 Dave Telgheder; 52 Jay Witasick; 36 Tim Worrell | Catchers: 23 A. J. Hinch; 5 Mike Macfarlane; 13 Izzy Molina; Infielders: 7 Kurt Abbott; 10 Mark Bellhorn; 6 Mike Blowers; 26 Rafael Bournigal; 30 Eric Chavez; 16 Jason Giambi; 17 Dave Magadan; 3 Bip Roberts; 21 Scott Spiezio; 8 Ed Sprague Jr.; 4 Miguel Tejada; 45 Jorge Velandia; 28 Jack Voigt; 39 Jason Wood | Outfielders: 53 Ryan Christenson; 14 Ben Grieve; 24 Rickey Henderson; 20 Brian Lesher; 2 Jason McDonald; 31,7 Kevin Mitchell; 54 Mike Neill; 12 Matt Stairs; Other batters: 5 Shane Mack | Manager: 18 Art Howe; Coaches: 3 Bob Cluck (pitching); 9 Duffy Dyer (bench); 35 Brad Fischer (bullpen); 47 Gary Jones (first base); 15 Denny Walling (hitting); 38 Ron Washington (third base) |

== Player stats ==
| = Indicates team leader |

| = Indicates league leader |

=== Batting ===
==== Starters by position ====
Note: Pos = Position; G = Games played; AB = At bats; R = Runs; H = Hits; HR = Home runs; RBI = Runs batted in; Avg. = Batting average; Slg. = Slugging average; SB = Stolen bases

| Pos | Player | G | AB | R | H | HR | RBI | Avg. | Slg. | SB |
|---|---|---|---|---|---|---|---|---|---|---|
| C | A. J. Hinch | 120 | 337 | 34 | 78 | 9 | 35 | .231 | .341 | 3 |
| 1B | Jason Giambi | 153 | 562 | 92 | 166 | 27 | 110 | .295 | .489 | 2 |
| 2B | Scott Spiezio | 114 | 406 | 54 | 105 | 9 | 50 | .259 | .377 | 1 |
| 3B | Mike Blowers | 129 | 409 | 56 | 97 | 11 | 71 | .237 | .386 | 1 |
| SS | Miguel Tejada | 105 | 365 | 53 | 85 | 11 | 45 | .233 | .384 | 5 |
| LF | Rickey Henderson | 152 | 542 | 101 | 128 | 14 | 57 | .236 | .347 | 66 |
| CF | Ryan Christenson | 117 | 370 | 56 | 95 | 5 | 50 | .257 | .368 | 5 |
| RF | Ben Grieve | 155 | 583 | 94 | 168 | 18 | 89 | .288 | .458 | 2 |
| DH | Matt Stairs | 149 | 523 | 88 | 154 | 26 | 106 | .294 | .511 | 8 |

==== Other batters ====
Note: G = Games played; AB = At bats; H = Hits; Avg. = Batting average; HR = Home runs; RBI = Runs batted in

| Player | G | AB | H | Avg. | HR | RBI |
|---|---|---|---|---|---|---|
| Rafael Bournigal | 85 | 209 | 47 | .225 | 1 | 19 |
| Mike Macfarlane | 78 | 207 | 52 | .251 | 7 | 34 |
| Bip Roberts | 61 | 182 | 51 | .280 | 1 | 15 |
| Jason McDonald | 70 | 175 | 44 | .251 | 1 | 16 |
| Kevin Mitchell | 51 | 127 | 29 | .228 | 2 | 21 |
| Kurt Abbott | 35 | 123 | 33 | .268 | 2 | 9 |
| Dave Magadan | 35 | 109 | 35 | .321 | 1 | 13 |
| Ed Sprague Jr. | 27 | 87 | 13 | .149 | 3 | 7 |
| Jack Voigt | 57 | 72 | 10 | .139 | 1 | 10 |
| Eric Chavez | 16 | 45 | 14 | .311 | 0 | 6 |
| Mike Neill | 6 | 15 | 4 | .267 | 0 | 0 |
| Mark Bellhorn | 11 | 12 | 1 | .083 | 0 | 1 |
| Brian Lesher | 7 | 7 | 1 | .143 | 0 | 1 |
| Jorge Velandia | 8 | 4 | 1 | .250 | 0 | 0 |
| Izzy Molina | 6 | 2 | 1 | .500 | 0 | 0 |
| Shane Mack | 3 | 2 | 0 | .000 | 0 | 0 |
| Jason Wood | 3 | 1 | 0 | .000 | 0 | 0 |

=== Pitching ===
==== Starting pitchers ====
Note: G = Games pitched; IP = Innings pitched; W = Wins; L = Losses; ERA = Earned run average; SO = Strikeouts

| Player | G | IP | W | L | ERA | SO |
|---|---|---|---|---|---|---|
| Kenny Rogers | 34 | 238.2 | 16 | 8 | 3.17 | 138 |
| Tom Candiotti | 33 | 201.0 | 11 | 16 | 4.84 | 98 |
| Jimmy Haynes | 33 | 194.1 | 11 | 9 | 5.09 | 134 |
| Mike Oquist | 31 | 175.0 | 7 | 11 | 6.22 | 112 |
| Blake Stein | 24 | 117.1 | 5 | 9 | 6.37 | 89 |
| Gil Heredia | 8 | 42.2 | 3 | 3 | 2.74 | 27 |
| Ariel Prieto | 2 | 8.1 | 0 | 1 | 11.88 | 8 |

==== Other pitchers ====
Note: G = Games pitched; IP = Innings pitched; W = Wins; L = Losses; ERA = Earned run average; SO = Strikeouts

| Player | G | IP | W | L | ERA | SO |
|---|---|---|---|---|---|---|
| Jay Witasick | 7 | 27.0 | 1 | 3 | 6.33 | 29 |
| Dave Telgheder | 8 | 20.0 | 0 | 1 | 3.60 | 5 |

==== Relief pitchers ====
Note: G = Games pitched; W = Wins; L = Losses; SV = Saves; ERA = Earned run average; SO = Strikeouts

| Player | G | W | L | SV | ERA | SO |
|---|---|---|---|---|---|---|
| Billy Taylor | 70 | 4 | 9 | 33 | 3.58 | 58 |
| Buddy Groom | 75 | 3 | 1 | 0 | 4.24 | 36 |
| T.J. Mathews | 66 | 7 | 4 | 1 | 4.58 | 53 |
| Mike Mohler | 57 | 3 | 3 | 0 | 5.16 | 42 |
| Mike Fetters | 48 | 1 | 6 | 5 | 3.99 | 34 |
| Tim Worrell | 25 | 0 | 1 | 0 | 4.00 | 33 |
| Aaron Small | 24 | 1 | 1 | 0 | 7.25 | 19 |
| Mark Holzemer | 13 | 1 | 0 | 0 | 5.59 | 3 |
| Jim Doughtery | 9 | 0 | 2 | 0 | 8.25 | 3 |
| Steve Connelly | 3 | 0 | 0 | 0 | 1.93 | 1 |

== Awards and honors ==
- Ben Grieve, AL Rookie of the Year

All-Star Game

- Ben Grieve, Outfield, Reserve

== Farm system ==
| Level | Team | League | Manager |
|---|---|---|---|
| AAA | Edmonton Trappers | Pacific Coast League | Mike Quade |
| AA | Huntsville Stars | Southern League | Jeffrey Leonard |
| A | Modesto A's | California League | Juan Navarrette |
| A | Visalia Oaks | California League | Tony DeFrancesco |
| A-Short Season | Southern Oregon Timberjacks | Northwest League | Greg Sparks |
| Rookie | AZL Athletics | Arizona League | John Kuehl |
