= 1998 Texas Rangers season =

1998 Texas Rangers
- American League West champions
- League: American League
- Division: Western Division
- Ballpark: The Ballpark in Arlington
- City: Arlington, Texas
- Record: 88–74 (.543)
- Divisional place: 1st
- Owners: Tom Hicks
- General manager: Doug Melvin
- Managers: Johnny Oates
- Television: KXTX-TV; KXAS-TV; Fox Sports Southwest (Tom Grieve, Bill Jones)
- Radio: KRLD (Eric Nadel, Vince Cotroneo); KMRT (Luis Mayoral, Josue Perez)

The 1998 Texas Rangers season involved the Rangers finishing first in the American League West with a record of 88 wins and 74 losses. It was the team's second post-season appearance, the first having been in 1996, but the team was eliminated in a three-game sweep by the New York Yankees in the Division Series.

== Offseason ==
- November 6, 1997: Jim Leyritz and Damon Buford were traded by the Rangers to the Boston Red Sox for Mark Brandenburg, Bill Haselman, and Aaron Sele.
- November 20, 1997: Scott Sheldon was signed as a free agent by the Rangers.
- December 7, 1997: Scott Bailes was signed as a free agent with the Texas Rangers.
- December 8, 1997: Kevin Elster was signed as a free agent with the Texas Rangers.
- December 9, 1997: Roberto Kelly was signed as a free agent by the Rangers.
- December 15, 1997: Scott Podsednik was drafted by the Rangers from the Florida Marlins in the 1997 rule 5 draft.
- December 23, 1997: Scott Cooper was signed as a free agent by the Rangers.
- March 14, 1998: Kevin Brown was traded by the Rangers to the Toronto Blue Jays for Tim Crabtree.

== Regular season ==
During the season, Rick Helling became the final pitcher to win at least 20 games in one season for the Rangers during the 1990s.

=== Season standings ===
AL West
Team	W	L	Pct.	GB	Home	Road
Texas Rangers	88	74	.543	—	48‍–‍33	40‍–‍41
Anaheim Angels	85	77	.525	3	42‍–‍39	43‍–‍38
Seattle Mariners	76	85	.472	11½	42‍–‍39	34‍–‍46
Oakland Athletics	74	88	.457	14	39‍–‍42	35‍–‍46

=== Record vs. opponents ===
1998 American League record Source: MLB Standings Grid – 1998
Team	ANA	BAL	BOS	CWS	CLE	DET	KC	MIN	NYY	OAK	SEA	TB	TEX	TOR	NL
Anaheim	—	5–6	6–5	5–6	4–7	8–3	6–5	6–5	6–5	5–7	9–3	6–5	5–7	4–7	10–6
Baltimore	6–5	—	6–6	2–9	5–6	10–1	5–6	7–3	3–9	8–3	6–5	5–7	6–5	5–7	5–11
Boston	5–6	6–6	—	5–6	8–3	5–5	8–3	5–6	5–7	9–2	7–4	9–3	6–5	5–7	9–7
Chicago	6–5	9–2	6–5	—	6–6	6–6	8–4	6–6	4–7	4–7	4–7	5–6	5–6	4–6–1	7–9
Cleveland	7–4	6–5	3–8	6–6	—	9–3	8–4	6–6	4–7	3–8	9–2	7–3	4–7	7–4	10–6
Detroit	3–8	1–10	5–5	6–6	3–9	—	6–6	8–4	3–8	7–4	3–8	5–6	3–8	5–6	7–9
Kansas City	5–6	6–5	3–8	4–8	4–8	6–6	—	7–5	0–10	7–4	4–6	8–3	3–8	6–5	9–7
Minnesota	5–6	3–7	6–5	6–6	6–6	4–8	5–7	—	4–7	4–7	2–9	7–4	7–4	4–7	7–9
New York	5–6	9–3	7–5	7–4	7–4	8–3	10–0	7–4	—	8–3	8–3	11–1	8–3	6–6	13–3
Oakland	7–5	3–8	2–9	7–4	8–3	4–7	4–7	7–4	3–8	—	5–7	5–6	6–6	5–6	8–8
Seattle	3–9	5–6	4–7	7–4	2–9	8–3	6–4	9–2	3–8	7–5	—	6–5	5–7	4–7	7–9
Tampa Bay	5–6	7–5	3–9	6–5	3–7	6–5	3–8	4–7	1–11	6–5	5–6	—	4–7	5–7	5–11
Texas	7–5	5–6	5–6	6–5	7–4	8–3	8–3	4–7	3–8	6–6	7–5	7–4	—	7–4	8–8
Toronto	7–4	7–5	7–5	6–4–1	4–7	6–5	5–6	7–4	6–6	6–5	7–4	7–5	4–7	—	9–7

=== Notable transactions ===
- July 17, 1998: Todd Van Poppel and Warren Morris were traded by the Rangers to the Pittsburgh Pirates for Esteban Loaiza.
- July 31, 1998: Kevin Elster was released by the Texas Rangers.
- August 26, 1998: Greg Cadaret was selected off waivers by the Rangers from the Anaheim Angels.

=== Roster ===
1998 Texas Rangers
Roster
Pitchers: 58 Scott Bailes; 33 John Burkett; 36 Greg Cadaret; 23 Tim Crabtree; 49 Tony Fossas; 53 Eric Gunderson; 32 Rick Helling; 31 Xavier Hernandez; 50 Jonathan Johnson; 43 Al Levine; 28 Esteban Loaiza; 28 Darren Oliver; 56 Danny Patterson; 59 Roger Pavlik; 40 Matt Perisho; 60 Julio Santana; 30 Aaron Sele; 44 Todd Stottlemyre; 51 Todd Van Poppel; 35 John Wetteland; 36 Bobby Witt	Catchers: 37 Bill Haselman; 7 Iván Rodríguez; Infielders: 10 Luis Alicea; 1 Domingo Cedeño; 22 Will Clark; 11,18 Royce Clayton; 18 Kevin Elster; 3 Mark McLemore; 4 Scott Sheldon; 9,11 Lee Stevens; 4 Fernando Tatís; 27 Todd Zeile	Outfielders: 18 Milt Cuyler; 19 Juan González; 24 Tom Goodwin; 29 Rusty Greer; 39 Roberto Kelly; 21 Warren Newson; 16 Mike Simms; Other batters: 14 Rob Sasser; 18 Chris Tremie	Manager: 26 Johnny Oates; Coaches: 17 Dick Bosman (Pitching); 20 Bucky Dent (Bench); 25 Larry Hardy (Bullpen); 8 Rudy Jaramillo (Hitting); 12 Ed Napoleon (First Base); 5 Jerry Narron (Third Base)

== Player stats ==
=== Batting ===
==== Starters by position ====
Note: Pos= Position; G = Games played; AB = At bats; R = Runs; H = Hits; HR = Home runs; RBI = Runs batted in; Avg. = Batting average; Slg. = Slugging Average; SB = Stolen bases

Pos	Player	G	AB	R	H	HR	RBI	Avg.	Slg.	SB
C	Iván Rodríguez	145	579	88	186	21	91	.321	.513	9
1B	Will Clark	149	554	98	169	23	102	.305	.507	1
2B	Mark McLemore	126	461	79	114	5	53	.247	.317	12
3B	Fernando Tatís	95	330	41	89	3	32	.270	.442	6
SS	Kevin Elster	84	297	33	69	8	37	.232	.354	0
LF	Rusty Greer	155	598	107	183	16	108	.306	.405	2
CF	Tom Goodwin	154	520	102	151	2	33	.290	.338	38
RF	Juan González	154	606	110	193	45	157	.318	.630	2
DH	Lee Stevens	120	344	52	91	20	59	.265	.512	0

==== Other batters ====
Note: G = Games played; AB = At bats; H = Hits; Avg. = Batting average; HR = Home runs; RBI = Runs batted in

Player	G	AB	H	Avg.	HR	RBI
Luis Alicea	101	259	71	.274	6	83
Roberto Kelly	75	257	83	.323	16	46
Mike Simms	86	186	55	.296	16	46
Royce Clayton	52	186	53	.285	5	24
Todd Zeile	52	180	47	.261	6	28
Domingo Cedeño	61	141	37	.262	2	21
Bill Haselman	40	105	33	.314	6	17
Warren Newson	10	21	4	.190	0	2
Scott Sheldon	7	16	2	.125	0	1
Milt Cuyler	7	6	3	.500	1	3
Chris Tremie	2	3	1	.333	0	0
Rob Sasser	1	1	0	.000	0	0

=== Pitching ===
==== Starting pitchers ====
Note: G = Games pitched; IP = Innings pitched; W = Wins; L = Losses; ERA = Earned run average; SO = Strikeouts

Player	G	IP	W	L	ERA	SO
Rick Helling	33	216.1	20	7	4.41	164
Aaron Sele	33	212.2	19	11	4.23	167
John Burkett	32	195.0	9	13	5.68	131
Darren Oliver	19	103.1	6	7	6.53	58
Esteban Loaiza	14	79.1	3	6	5.90	55
Bobby Witt	14	69.1	5	4	7.66	30
Todd Stottlemyre	10	60.1	5	4	4.33	57
Todd Van Poppel	4	19.1	1	2	8.84	10
Matt Perisho	2	5.0	0	2	27.00	2
Jonathan Johnson	1	4.1	0	0	8.31	3

==== Relief pitchers ====
Note: G = Games pitched; W = Wins; L = Losses; SV = Saves; ERA = Earned run average; SO = Strikeouts

Player	G	W	L	SV	ERA	SO
John Wetteland	63	3	1	42	2.03	72
Eric Gunderson	68	0	3	0	5.19	41
Tim Crabtree	64	6	1	0	3.59	60
Danny Patterson	56	2	5	2	4.45	33
Xavier Hernandez	46	6	6	1	3.57	41
Scott Bailes	46	1	0	0	6.47	30
Al Levine	30	0	1	0	4.50	19
Greg Cadaret	11	0	0	0	4.70	5
Tony Fossas	10	1	0	0	0.00	7
Roger Pavlik	5	1	1	1	3.86	8
Julio Santana	3	0	0	0	8.44	1

== New York Yankees vs. Texas Rangers ==
=== Game 1 ===
September 29 at Yankee Stadium (New York Yankees)

Team	1	2	3	4	5	6	7	8	9	R	H	E
Texas	0	0	0	0	0	0	0	0	0	0	5	0
New York	0	2	0	0	0	0	0	0	0	2	6	0
W: David Wells (1–0) L: Todd Stottlemyre (0–1) S: Mariano Rivera (1)

=== Game 2 ===
September 30 at Yankee Stadium (New York Yankees)

Team	1	2	3	4	5	6	7	8	9	R	H	E
Texas	0	0	0	0	1	0	0	0	0	1	5	0
New York	0	1	0	2	0	0	0	0	0	3	8	0
W: Andy Pettitte (1–0) L: Rick Helling (0–1) S: Mariano Rivera (2)
HR: NYY – Shane Spencer, Scott Brosius

=== Game 3 ===
October 2 at The Ballpark in Arlington (Texas Rangers)

Team	1	2	3	4	5	6	7	8	9	R	H	E
New York	0	0	0	0	0	4	0	0	0	4	9	1
Texas	0	0	0	0	0	0	0	0	0	0	3	1
W: David Cone (1–0) L: Aaron Sele (0–1)
HR: NYY – Shane Spencer, Paul O'Neill

== Awards and honors ==
- Juan González, AL MVP
- Juan González, Silver Slugger Award
- Iván Rodríguez, C, Gold Glove
- Iván Rodríguez, Silver Slugger Award

All-Star Game

== Farm system ==
Level	Team	League	Manager
AAA	Oklahoma RedHawks	Pacific Coast League	Greg Biagini
AA	Tulsa Drillers	Texas League	Bobby Jones
A	Charlotte Rangers	Florida State League	Jim Byrd
A	Savannah Sand Gnats	South Atlantic League	Paul Carey
Rookie	Pulaski Rangers	Appalachian League	Bruce Crabbe
Rookie	GCL Rangers	Gulf Coast League	Darryl Kennedy

LEAGUE CHAMPIONS: Tulsa, GCL Rangers
