= 1997 Major League Baseball All-Star Game =

1997 American baseball competition

	1	2	3	4	5	6	7	8	9	R	H	E
National League	0	0	0	0	0	0	1	0	0	1	3	0
American League	0	1	0	0	0	0	2	0	0	3	7	0
- Date: July 8, 1997
- Venue: Jacobs Field
- City: Cleveland, Ohio
- Managers: Bobby Cox (ATL); Joe Torre (NYY)
- MVP: Sandy Alomar Jr. (CLE)
- Attendance: 44,916
- Ceremonial first pitch: Larry Doby
- Television: Fox (United States); MLB International (International)
- TV announcers: Joe Buck, Tim McCarver and Bob Brenly (Fox); Gary Thorne and Ken Singleton (MLB International)
- Radio: CBS
- Radio announcers: John Rooney, Jerry Coleman and Jeff Torborg

The 1997 Major League Baseball All-Star Game was the 68th playing of the midsummer classic between the all-stars of the American League (AL) and National League (NL), the two leagues comprising Major League Baseball. The game was held on July 8, 1997, at Jacobs Field in Cleveland, the home of the Cleveland Indians of the American League. The game resulted in the American League defeating the National League 3-1. The game marked the fifth time the All-Star Game was held in Cleveland and first since 1981. It was also the first All-Star game held at Jacobs Field, which opened three years earlier.

== Rosters ==
Players in italics have since been inducted into the National Baseball Hall of Fame.

=== National League ===
Starters
Position	Player	Team	All-Star Games
C	Mike Piazza	Dodgers	5
1B	Jeff Bagwell	Astros	3
2B	Craig Biggio	Astros	6
3B	Ken Caminiti	Padres	3
SS	Barry Larkin	Reds	9
OF	Barry Bonds	Giants	7
OF	Kenny Lofton	Braves	4
OF	Larry Walker	Rockies	2
DH	Tony Gwynn	Padres	13

Pitchers
Position	Player	Team	All-Star Games
P	Rod Beck	Giants	3
P	Kevin Brown	Marlins	3
P	Shawn Estes	Giants	1
P	Tom Glavine	Braves	5
P	Bobby Jones	Mets	1
P	Darryl Kile	Astros	2
P	Greg Maddux	Braves	6
P	Pedro Martínez	Expos	2
P	Denny Neagle	Braves	2
P	Curt Schilling	Phillies	1

Reserves
Position	Player	Team	All-Star Games
C	Todd Hundley	Mets	2
C	Charles Johnson	Marlins	1
C	Javy López	Braves	1
1B	Andrés Galarraga	Rockies	3
1B	Mark Grace	Cubs	3
2B	Tony Womack	Pirates	1
3B	Chipper Jones	Braves	2
SS	Jeff Blauser	Braves	2
SS	Royce Clayton	Cardinals	1
OF	Moisés Alou	Marlins	2
OF	Steve Finley	Padres	1
OF	Ray Lankford	Cardinals	1

=== American League ===
Starters
Position	Player	Team	All-Star Games
C	Iván Rodríguez	Rangers	6
1B	Tino Martinez	Yankees	2
2B	Roberto Alomar	Orioles	8
3B	Cal Ripken Jr.	Orioles	15
SS	Alex Rodriguez	Mariners	2
OF	Brady Anderson	Orioles	3
OF	Ken Griffey Jr.	Mariners	8
OF	David Justice	Indians	3
DH	Edgar Martínez	Mariners	4

Pitchers
Position	Player	Team	All-Star Games
P	Roger Clemens	Blue Jays	6
P	David Cone	Yankees	4
P	Jason Dickson	Angels	1
P	Pat Hentgen	Blue Jays	3
P	Randy Johnson	Mariners	5
P	Mike Mussina	Orioles	4
P	Randy Myers	Orioles	4
P	Mariano Rivera	Yankees	1
P	José Rosado	Royals	1
P	Justin Thompson	Tigers	1

Reserves
Position	Player	Team	All-Star Games
C	Sandy Alomar Jr.	Indians	5
1B	Mark McGwire	Athletics	9
1B	Frank Thomas	White Sox	5
1B	Jim Thome	Indians	1
2B	Joey Cora	Mariners	1
2B	Chuck Knoblauch	Twins	4
3B	Jeff Cirillo	Brewers	1
SS	Nomar Garciaparra	Red Sox	1
OF	Albert Belle	White Sox	5
OF	Paul O'Neill	Yankees	4
OF	Bernie Williams	Yankees	1

== Game ==
=== Umpires ===
Home Plate	Larry Barnett (AL)
First Base	Gerry Davis (NL)
Second Base	Drew Coble (AL)
Third Base	Jeff Kellogg (NL)
Left Field	Terry Craft (AL)
Right Field	Wally Bell (NL)

=== Starting lineups ===
National League				American League			
Order	Player	Team	Position	Order	Player	Team	Position
1	Craig Biggio	Astros	2B	1	Brady Anderson	Orioles	LF
2	Tony Gwynn	Padres	DH	2	Alex Rodriguez	Mariners	SS
3	Barry Bonds	Giants	LF	3	Ken Griffey Jr.	Mariners	CF
4	Mike Piazza	Dodgers	C	4	Tino Martinez	Yankees	1B
5	Jeff Bagwell	Astros	1B	5	Edgar Martínez	Mariners	DH
6	Larry Walker	Rockies	RF	6	Paul O'Neill	Yankees	RF
7	Ken Caminiti	Padres	3B	7	Cal Ripken Jr.	Orioles	3B
8	Ray Lankford	Cardinals	CF	8	Iván Rodríguez	Rangers	C
9	Jeff Blauser	Braves	SS	9	Roberto Alomar	Orioles	2B
	Greg Maddux	Braves	P		Randy Johnson	Mariners	P

=== Game summary ===
Tuesday, July 8, 1997 8:29 pm (ET) at Jacobs Field in Cleveland, Ohio
Team	1	2	3	4	5	6	7	8	9	R	H	E
National League	0	0	0	0	0	0	1	0	0	1	3	0
American League	0	1	0	0	0	0	2	0	-	3	7	0
WP: José Rosado (1-0) LP: Shawn Estes (0-1) Sv: Mariano Rivera (1); Home runs: NL: Javy López (1); AL: Edgar Martínez (1), Sandy Alomar Jr. (1)

The American League jumped out to a 1-0 lead in the 2nd inning led by a home run by Edgar Martínez of the Seattle Mariners. No one would score after that until the 7th inning when Javy López of the Atlanta Braves would tie the game with a home run of his own. However, in the bottom of the 7th, Bernie Williams of the New York Yankees walked and then Sandy Alomar Jr. of the Cleveland Indians hit a home run to give the American League the lead and the win, as they held on to defeat the National League 3-1. All the runs were driven in and scored by players either born (Alomar, López & Williams) or raised (Martinez) in Puerto Rico. Winning pitcher José Rosado's family roots are also from that island.

The loudest ovation of the All-Star Game, which came early in the player introductions, was reserved for Kenny Lofton, whom the Indians had traded to the Atlanta Braves prior to the start of the 1997 season. Lofton was on the National League roster, but was injured and did not play. Also in the pregame ceremonies, Albert Belle, who was representing the Chicago White Sox, was booed for leaving the Indians as a free agent the previous winter.

Unlike past years, the performance of O Canada, this year by the McAuley Boys, was not televised. Instead, the Fox network, airing its first All-Star Game, went into a commercial break, resulting in angry phone calls from Canadian television viewers. The Canadian National Anthem was later shown on tape delay after the game in the Cleveland area. Country star LeAnn Rimes sang the National Anthem following the commercial break. To commemorate the 50th anniversary of baseball's breaking of the color barrier, the ceremonial first pitch featured former Indian Larry Doby, the first African-American player to play in the American League.

One of the more colorful moments in All-Star Game history occurred during an at bat with Randy Johnson of the Seattle Mariners pitching and Larry Walker of the Colorado Rockies at the plate. The teams of the two former Montreal Expos teammates had faced each other about one month prior. However, when Johnson started on June 12, Walker chose not to play, explaining that, "I faced Randy one time in spring training and he almost killed me." In this All-Star Game, Walker batted against Johnson, who theatrically threw over his head. Ever adaptable, Walker placed his batting helmet backwards and switched sides in the batters' box to stand right-handed for one pitch. He ended the at bat by drawing a walk. The incident momentarily drew mirth and laughter from players in both dugouts, fans and announcers, and comparisons to Johnson pitching against John Kruk in the 1993 All-Star Game, in which he also threw over his head. In spite of garnering a reputation of avoiding Johnson, Walker batted .393 (11 hits in 28 at bats) against him in his career, nearly double the rate of all left-handed batters at .199.

Alomar was named MVP of the game, becoming the first player to win the All Star Game MVP award as a member of the host team (Pedro Martínez in 1999 and Shane Bieber in 2019 would later win MVP awards in their home ballparks). After the game, Major League Baseball CEO Paul Beeston presented Alomar with the MVP Award in lieu of the Commissioner of Baseball, who would not be named until after the next All-Star Game, when then-Chairman of the Executive Committee Bud Selig was officially named Commissioner.

This was the last All-Star Game in which the Milwaukee Brewers were a member of the American League. The Brewers moved to the National League for the 1998 season.
