= Ray Ragelis =

American basketball player (1928–1983)

Personal information
- Born: December 10, 1928 East Chicago, Indiana, U.S.
- Died: September 19, 1983 (aged 54) East Chicago, Indiana, U.S.
- Listed height: 6 ft 4 in (1.93 m)
- Listed weight: 205 lb (93 kg)

Career information
- High school: Washington (East Chicago, Indiana)
- College: Northwestern (1948–1951)
- NBA draft: 1951: 2nd round, 17th overall pick
- Drafted by: Rochester Royals
- Playing career: 1951–1952
- Position: Small forward / power forward
- Number: 18

Career history

Playing
- 1951–1952: Rochester Royals

Coaching
- 1954–1955: Lake Forest

Career highlights
- Third-team All-American – Look (1951); First-team All-Big Ten (1951)

Career NBA statistics
- Points: 68 (1.3 ppg)
- Rebounds: 76 (1.5 rpg)
- Assists: 31 (0.6 apg)
- Stats at NBA.com
- Stats at Basketball Reference

Raymond Ernest Ragelis (December 10, 1928 – September 19, 1983) was an American professional basketball player of Lithuanian descent. He played one season in the National Basketball Association (NBA) after an All-American college career at Northwestern University.

== Early years ==
Ragelis was born on December 10, 1928, to a family of Lithuanian immigrants. He attended the Washington High School in East Chicago, Indiana, playing for Johnnie Baratto; he led the Senators to the State Finals in 1947. He was inducted into the Indiana Basketball Hall of Fame in 1991.

== College and professional career ==
Ragelis played for the Northwestern Wildcats. He was the first player in university's history to score 1,000 career points, and led the team in scoring for two years. Ragelis led the Big Ten Conference in scoring during the 1950–51 season, averaging 19.1 points, which earned him All-American honours. He was the last player from university's basketball program to lead the conference in scoring until John Shurna in 2012.

A 6 ft 4 in (1.93 m) and 205 lb (93 kg) forward from Northwestern University, Ragelis was selected in the second round of the 1951 NBA draft by the Rochester Royals. He played one season with Rochester, coming off the bench in 51 of the 66 games and averaging 1.3 points per game, 1.5 rebounds per game, and 0.6 assists per game. The Royals lost to the Minneapolis Lakers in the Division Finals of the 1952 NBA Playoffs.

== Later years ==
After his NBA career, Ragelis joined the military for two years and later started coaching. He first coached at Lake Forest College, and later served as an assistant coach at Northwestern University. After three years as assistant coach at Northwestern University, he became the head coach at Washington High School. Ragelis died on September 19, 1983, in West Side Veterans Hospital in East Chicago, Indiana.

== Career statistics ==
Legend
GP	Games played	GS	Games started	MPG	Minutes per game
FG%	Field goal percentage	3P%	3-point field goal percentage	FT%	Free throw percentage
RPG	Rebounds per game	APG	Assists per game	SPG	Steals per game
BPG	Blocks per game	PPG	Points per game	**Bold**	Career high

=== NBA ===
==== Regular season ====
Year	Team	GP	MPG	FG%	FT%	RPG	APG	PPG
1951–52	Rochester	51	6.6	.260	.621	1.5	.6	1.3

==== Playoffs ====
Year	Team	GP	MPG	FG%	FT%	RPG	APG	PPG
1952	Rochester	3	2.3	.000	–	.3	.3	.0
