= 1998 American League Division Series =

Teams
Team (Wins)		Manager	Season
New York Yankees (3)		Joe Torre	114–48 (.704), GA: 22
Texas Rangers (0)		Johnny Oates	88–74 (.543), GA: 3
- Dates: September 29–October 2
- Television: Fox (Game 1); NBC (Games 2–3)
- TV announcers: Joe Buck and Tim McCarver (Game 1); Bob Costas and Joe Morgan (Games 2–3)
- Radio: ESPN
- Radio announcers: Dan Shulman and Buck Martinez
- Umpires: Games 1–2: Jim Joyce, Rich Garcia, Tim Tschida, Drew Coble, Terry Craft, Durwood Merrill; Game 3: Dale Scott, Joe Brinkman, John Hirschbeck, Larry McCoy, Dave Phillips

Teams
Team (Wins)		Manager	Season
Cleveland Indians (3)		Mike Hargrove	89–73 (.549), GA: 9
Boston Red Sox (1)		Jimy Williams	92–70 (.568), GB: 22
- Dates: September 29–October 3
- Television: ESPN (Games 1–3); Fox (Game 4)
- TV announcers: Chris Berman and Ray Knight (Games 1–3); Joe Buck and Tim McCarver (Game 4)
- Radio: ESPN
- Radio announcers: Ernie Harwell and Dave Campbell
- Umpires: Games 1–2: Dale Scott, Joe Brinkman, John Hirschbeck, Larry McCoy, Dave Phillips, Chuck Meriwether; Game 3: Jim Joyce, Rich Garcia, Tim Tschida, Drew Coble, Terry Craft, Durwood Merrill; Game 4: Jim Joyce, Rich Garcia, Tim Tschida, Drew Coble, Terry Craft, Chuck Meriwether

The 1998 American League Division Series (ALDS), consisted of two best-of-five playoff series on the American League side in Major League Baseball's (MLB) 1998 postseason, began on Tuesday, September 29, and ended on Saturday, October 3, with the champions of the three AL divisions—along with a "wild card" team—participating in two series.

Under MLB's playoff format, no two teams from the same division were matched up in the Division Series, regardless of whether their records would normally indicate such a matchup. For the first time ever, home field advantage went to the team with the better regular-season record with the exception of the wild card team, which defers home field advantage regardless of record. The matchups were:

- (1) New York Yankees (AL East champions) vs. (3) Texas Rangers (AL West champions): Yankees won the series, 3–0.
- (2) Cleveland Indians (AL Central champions) vs. (4) Boston Red Sox (Wild Card qualifier): Indians won the series, 3–1.

Also for the first time, the team with home field advantage (the higher seeded team) in each series hosts Games 1, 2, and 5 (if necessary), and the lower seeded team hosts Games 3 and 4 (if necessary). Prior to 1998, the team with home field advantage in all MLB best-of-five series began on the road for Games 1–2, and hosted Games 3–5 (with Games 4–5 if necessary).

The Yankees and Indians went on to meet in the AL Championship Series (ALCS). The Yankees became the American League champion and defeated the National League champion San Diego Padres in the 1998 World Series.

== Matchups ==
=== New York Yankees vs. Texas Rangers ===
New York won the series, 3–0.

Game	Date	Score	Location	Time	Attendance
1	September 29	Texas Rangers – 0, New York Yankees – 2	Yankee Stadium (I)	3:02	57,362
2	September 30	Texas Rangers – 1, New York Yankees – 3	Yankee Stadium (I)	2:58	57,360
3	October 2	New York Yankees – 4, Texas Rangers – 0	The Ballpark in Arlington	2:58	49,450

=== Cleveland Indians vs. Boston Red Sox ===
Cleveland won the series, 3–1.

Game	Date	Score	Location	Time	Attendance
1	September 29	Boston Red Sox – 11, Cleveland Indians – 3	Jacobs Field	3:16	45,185
2	September 30	Boston Red Sox – 5, Cleveland Indians – 9	Jacobs Field	3:25	45,229
3	October 2	Cleveland Indians – 4, Boston Red Sox – 3	Fenway Park	2:27	33,114
4	October 3	Cleveland Indians – 2, Boston Red Sox – 1	Fenway Park	3:00	33,537

== New York vs. Texas ==
=== Game 1 ===
September 29, 1998 8:07 pm (EDT) at Yankee Stadium (I) in Bronx, New York 67 °F (19 °C), clear
Team	1	2	3	4	5	6	7	8	9	R	H	E
Texas	0	0	0	0	0	0	0	0	0	0	5	0
New York	0	2	0	0	0	0	0	0	X	2	6	0
WP: David Wells (1–0) LP: Todd Stottlemyre (0–1) Sv: Mariano Rivera (1); Attendance: 57,362; Boxscore

Scott Brosius was the hero of Game 1, as Todd Stottlemyre faced David Wells. In the bottom of the second, innings Stottlemyre yielded two runs when Brosius singled in Jorge Posada after Chad Curtis doubled and Curtis scored when Chuck Knoblauch struck out and Brosius was caught stealing. Stottlemyre pitched a complete game in a losing effort. David Wells and Mariano Rivera limited the loaded Texas lineup, which had scored 940 runs in 1998, to only five hits.

=== Game 2 ===
September 30, 1998 8:07 pm (EDT) at Yankee Stadium (I) in Bronx, New York 68 °F (20 °C), overcast
Team	1	2	3	4	5	6	7	8	9	R	H	E
Texas	0	0	0	0	1	0	0	0	0	1	5	0
New York	0	1	0	2	0	0	0	0	X	3	8	0
WP: Andy Pettitte (1–0) LP: Rick Helling (0–1) Sv: Mariano Rivera (2); Home runs: TEX: None; NYY: Shane Spencer (1), Scott Brosius (1); Attendance: 57,360; Boxscore

Rick Helling went against Andy Pettitte in Game 2. Shane Spencer started the scoring when he homered in the bottom of the second. Brosius then hit a two-run homer in the Yankees fourth. Texas scored their only run of the series when Juan González doubled and later scored on an Iván Rodríguez single in the fifth inning. Once again, the Rangers were limited to five hits by Pettitte, Jeff Nelson, and Rivera.

=== Game 3 ===
October 2, 1998 7:12 pm (CDT) at The Ballpark in Arlington in Arlington, Texas 81 °F (27 °C), cloudy
Team	1	2	3	4	5	6	7	8	9	R	H	E
New York	0	0	0	0	0	4	0	0	0	4	9	1
Texas	0	0	0	0	0	0	0	0	0	0	3	1
WP: David Cone (1–0) LP: Aaron Sele (0–1); Home runs: NYY: Paul O'Neill (1), Shane Spencer (2); TEX: None; Attendance: 49,450; Boxscore

The Rangers were once again stymied by the Yankees pitching staff. Twenty-game winner David Cone faced Aaron Sele, and both were matching each other pitch-for-pitch into the sixth. Paul O'Neill put the Yankees on top by hitting a home run with one out in the Yankees sixth. Then, with two runners on and two out, Shane Spencer slammed his second home run of the series to make it 4–0. Cone left after a rain delay, but the Yankees' bullpen held Texas in check the rest of the way. Will Clark grounded out to end the series.

=== Composite box ===
1998 ALDS (3–0): New York Yankees over Texas Rangers

Team	1	2	3	4	5	6	7	8	9	R	H	E
New York Yankees	0	3	0	2	0	4	0	0	0	9	23	1
Texas Rangers	0	0	0	0	1	0	0	0	0	1	13	1
Total attendance: 164,172 Average attendance: 54,724

== Cleveland vs. Boston ==
=== Game 1 ===
September 29, 1998 1:07 pm (EDT) at Jacobs Field in Cleveland, Ohio 68 °F (20 °C), sunny
Team	1	2	3	4	5	6	7	8	9	R	H	E
Boston	3	0	0	0	3	2	0	3	0	11	12	0
Cleveland	0	0	0	0	0	2	1	0	0	3	7	0
WP: Pedro Martínez (1–0) LP: Jaret Wright (0–1); Home runs: BOS: Mo Vaughn 2 (2), Nomar Garciaparra (1); CLE: Kenny Lofton (1), Jim Thome (1); Attendance: 45,185; Boxscore

The first of many rough starts for Cleveland pitcher Jaret Wright in the 1998 postseason was in Game 1. Wright faced Pedro Martínez, and Pedro would get all the run support in the world. After leadoff hits in the first by Darren Lewis and John Valentin, Mo Vaughn slugged a three-run home run to put Boston up for good. In the top of the fifth, with Lewis and Valentin on and one out, Nomar Garciaparra also slugged a three-run home run. Jaret's night was done. A one-out single in the top of the sixth by Valentin led to Vaughn's second home run of the game to put Boston up 8–0. Cleveland responded with a two-run home run by Kenny Lofton in the bottom half of the sixth and a Thome home run in the seventh. Vaughn doubled in two more runs in the eighth as the Red Sox scored three more runs to make the final score 11–3. The win ended a thirteen-game postseason losing streak for the Red Sox dating back to Game 6 of the 1986 World Series.

=== Game 2 ===
September 30, 1998 1:07 pm (EDT) at Jacobs Field in Cleveland, Ohio 68 °F (20 °C), cloudy
Team	1	2	3	4	5	6	7	8	9	R	H	E
Boston	2	0	1	0	0	2	0	0	0	5	10	0
Cleveland	1	5	1	0	0	1	0	1	X	9	9	1
WP: Dave Burba (1–0) LP: Tim Wakefield (0–1) Sv: Mike Jackson (1); Home runs: BOS: None; CLE: David Justice (1); Attendance: 45,229; Boxscore

Dwight Gooden faced Tim Wakefield in Game 2. The Red Sox scored two runs in a controversial first inning surrounding home plate umpire Joe Brinkman. After calling all of the first three pitches balls, of which 2 were near the edge of the strike zone, Indians' manager Mike Hargrove expressed his disagreement and was promptly ejected from the game by Brinkman. Later that same inning, with two runners aboard, Nomar Garciaparra doubled off the left-field wall. Darren Lewis scored as John Valentin tried to score on a slide. Omar Vizquel's relay throw appeared to be time to get Valentin, but Brinkman called him safe. Gooden had a meltdown at home plate and had to be restrained by his teammates as he also was ejected. Replays confirmed Valentin was out at the plate. Gooden was replaced by Dave Burba, who promptly retired the next two batters. David Justice cut the lead in half by hitting a sacrifice fly that scored Lofton in the Indians first. Then the Indians tied it when Sandy Alomar Jr. doubled in Brian Giles in the second. After Joey Cora walked, Lofton doubled in Alomar to give the Indians the lead. Wakefield left the game and, with two out, David Justice hit a three-run home run to put the Indians up for good. Garciaparra drove in a run for Boston in the third, but an Alomar double scored Travis Fryman to make it 7–3. The Red Sox came within two in the sixth, but the Indians scored one in the bottom half and one in the eighth on a wild pitch. That made the final score 9–5 Indians.

=== Game 3 ===
October 2, 1998 4:07 pm (EDT) at Fenway Park in Boston, Massachusetts 64 °F (18 °C), windy, sunny
Team	1	2	3	4	5	6	7	8	9	R	H	E
Cleveland	0	0	0	0	1	1	1	0	1	4	5	0
Boston	0	0	0	1	0	0	0	0	2	3	6	0
WP: Charles Nagy (1–0) LP: Bret Saberhagen (0–1) Sv: Mike Jackson (2); Home runs: CLE: Jim Thome (2), Kenny Lofton (2), Manny Ramírez 2 (2); BOS: Nomar Garciaparra (2); Attendance: 33,114; Boxscore

Charles Nagy faced Bret Saberhagen in the critical Game 3. The Red Sox struck first on an RBI-forceout in the fourth. It didn't take long to respond, as Jim Thome led the Indians fifth off with a home run. In the sixth, Kenny Lofton homered to put the Indians on top. Then Manny Ramírez homered in the seventh to give the Indians a 3–1 edge. Manny Ramírez would homer once again in the ninth, this time off Dennis Eckersley. The Red Sox wouldn't go quietly in the bottom of the ninth as Nomar Garciaparra hit a two-run home run to bring the game within one run. However, Mike Jackson retired the next two batters in succession to give the Indians a two games to one lead in the series.

=== Game 4 ===
October 3, 1998 4:07 pm (EDT) at Fenway Park in Boston, Massachusetts 64 °F (18 °C), sunny
Team	1	2	3	4	5	6	7	8	9	R	H	E
Cleveland	0	0	0	0	0	0	0	2	0	2	5	0
Boston	0	0	0	1	0	0	0	0	0	1	6	0
WP: Steve Reed (1–0) LP: Tom Gordon (0–1) Sv: Mike Jackson (3); Home runs: CLE: None; BOS: Nomar Garciaparra (3); Attendance: 33,537; Boxscore

Bartolo Colón went against Pete Schourek, looking to save the Red Sox. In the fourth, Nomar Garciaparra homered to lead off to put the Red Sox up 1–0, but they would squander the lead for the third consecutive game. In the eighth, with Tom Gordon pitching for Boston, Kenny Lofton and Omar Vizquel both singled with one out. Justice then doubled to center which scored both Lofton and Vizquel to put the Indians out in front 2–1. Not much happened afterwards, as Darren Bragg struck out swinging to end the series.

=== Composite box ===
1998 ALDS (3–1): Cleveland Indians over Boston Red Sox

Team	1	2	3	4	5	6	7	8	9	R	H	E
Cleveland Indians	1	5	1	0	1	4	2	3	1	18	26	1
Boston Red Sox	5	0	1	2	3	4	0	3	2	20	34	0
Total attendance: 157,065 Average attendance: 39,266
