= Drew Coble =

American baseball umpire (born 1947)

- Born: George Drew Coble; December 18, 1947 (age 78); Burlington, North Carolina, U.S.
- Occupation: MLB umpire
- Years active: 1982–1999
- Employer: American League
- Height: 6 ft 3 in (1.91 m)

George Drew Coble (born December 18, 1947) is an American former professional baseball umpire who worked in the American League from 1982 to 1999. Coble umpired 2,303 major league games in his 18-year career. Coble wore uniform number 37. He was promoted to crew chief in 1991. He umpired in the World Series (1991), two All-Star Games (1985 and 1997), three American League Championship Series (1987, 1992 and 1995), and two American League Division Series (1996 and 1998).

Coble was very unusual in that he used different stances for left-handed and right-handed batters. He squatted when a lefty was at the plate, but when a righty came up, he dropped to one knee.

== Notable games ==
In 1990, Coble became only the fifth umpire to call two no-hitters in the same season.

In Game 2 of the 1991 World Series, Coble made a controversial third-inning call at first base. Ron Gant had singled for Atlanta and was returning to the bag when the throw came in to first base from the outfield. Replays suggest Gant may have been lifted off the bag by Minnesota first baseman Kent Hrbek. Coble ruled Gant's own momentum carried him off the bag, calling Gant out. The Braves lost the game by one run and ultimately lost the series in seven games.

== Resignation and wife's death ==
Coble was affected by the 1999 Major League Umpires Association mass resignation, a negotiating strategy that backfired when Major League Baseball simply accepted the resignations. Some umpires were able to regain their jobs, but Coble and 21 other umpires initially were not. Coble denies that he even signed a letter of resignation. Three days after Coble's resignation was accepted, his wife Kim died of cancer at the age of 44.

In subsequent arbitration, the MLB was ordered to rehire several of the affected umpires, including Coble. He never returned to the field, however. Coble retired as part of a 2002 agreement that he reached with the MLB.

== Personal life ==
Coble married Cindy Pugh on July 15, 2015 in Oak Island, NC. He is an alumnus of Elon College and a member of the Elon Sports Hall of Fame. After serving in the United States Air Force, Coble played catcher and first base for Elon, earning team MVP honors in his junior season.

== See also ==
- List of Major League Baseball umpires (disambiguation)
