= Washington High School (East Chicago, Indiana) =

Coordinates: 41.6403°N 87.4517°W

Location
- 1611 W. 141st Street; East Chicago, (Lake County), Indiana 46312; United States

Information
- Type: Public, Coeducational
- Established: 1898
- Closed: 1986
- School district: School City of East Chicago
- Grades: 9–12
- Student to teacher ratio: 14:1
- Colors: Maroon and White
- Fight song: Hail Noble Washington
- Athletics: 12 Varsity Teams
- Athletics conference: Lake Shore (defunct)
- Mascot: Mr. Senator
- Nickname: Senators
- Rival: East Chicago Roosevelt
- Newspaper: The Senatorial
- Yearbook: The Anvil

Washington High School was a public high school in East Chicago, Indiana, which opened in 1898 but closed in 1986. Washington High School merged with Roosevelt High School to become East Chicago Central High School, known in the area as "Central."

== Athletics ==
The Washington High School Senators athletic teams competed in the Indiana Lake Shore conference from 1969 until the school closed in 1986. Prior to 1969, the school was a member of the Northern Indiana conference (1927–1962), the Northwestern conference (1963–1967) and the Tri-City conference (1968). The school was also a member of the Indiana High School Athletic Association (IHSAA), the organization which governs athletic activities in Indiana.

The school sponsored various interscholastic athletics teams. The Senators won state championships in basketball (1960, 1971). The 1971 "Dream Team" was ranked No.1 in the state for the entire season, and went undefeated (29–0) and won the Indiana state high school basketball championship. The team featured Tim Stoddard (who played baseball and basketball at N.C. State and spent 15 year in Major League Baseball ), Pete Trgovich (who played at UCLA), and Junior Bridgeman (who played at Louisville and in the NBA). The three would all go on to reach the Final Four.

Kenny Lofton is a retired MLB All-Star center fielder who played for several teams in the 1990s and 2000s. Lofton graduated from East Chicago Washington in 1985. He played in an NCAA Men's Basketball Final Four in 1987 with Arizona, and joins Stoddard (who played in the 1983 World Series with the Baltimore Orioles) as the only two athletes to play in a baseball World Series and an NCAA basketball Final Four; Lofton batted in the lead off spot in the 1995 World Series for the Cleveland Indians.

== Notable alumni ==
- Vince Boryla, professional basketball player, coach, and executive
- Junior Bridgeman, professional basketball player and businessman
- Emilio A. De La Garza, posthumous recipient of the Medal of Honor
- Leslie Edgley, novelist, playwright, radio dramatist and screenwriter
- Katherine Jackson, matriarch of the Jackson family
- Kenny Lofton, professional baseball player
- Nick Mantis, professional basketball player
- Art Murakowski, professional football player and legislator
- Vincent Mroz, United States Secret Service agent involved in the 1950 shootout at Blair House
- Ray Ragelis, professional basketball player and coach
- Quentin P. Smith, Tuskegee Airman
- Tim Stoddard, professional baseball player and coach
- Pete Trgovich, college basketball player and coach
- Warren W. Wiersbe, Christian clergyman and author
- Irene Herlocker-Meyer, chemist and environmentalist
