= Terry Craft =

American baseball umpire (born 1954)

- Born: Terry Lee Craft; December 9, 1954 (age 70); Portsmouth, Ohio, U.S.
- Occupation: Umpire
- Years active: 1987–1999 (AL), 2000–2006 (MLB)
- Employer(s): American League, Major League Baseball

Terry Lee Craft (born December 9, 1954) is an American former professional baseball umpire who worked in the American League from 1987 to 1999 and throughout both major leagues from 2000 to 2006. Craft umpired 1,734 major league games in his 20-year career. He umpired in two no-hitters, a Major League Baseball All-Star Game, an American League Championship Series, and two Division Series.

== Early career ==
After graduating from McKell High School in South Shore, Kentucky, Craft enlisted in the U.S. Army. During his seven years on active duty, Craft began to umpire baseball games. He attended the Bill Kinnamon Umpire School after his military discharge. From 1979 to 1986, Craft worked in several minor leagues, including the Appalachian League, South Atlantic League, Carolina League, Southern League, International League and Dominican Winter League.

== MLB career ==
Craft broke into Major League Baseball as a reserve umpire in 1987. He moved up from the International League when needed to cover for MLB umpire vacations. He worked portions of six major league seasons, working predominantly at the major league level for the 1992 season. He was officially called up to the full-time MLB staff in 1993. Craft was one of only a handful of umpires who did not submit resignations during the 1999 Major League Umpires Association mass resignation.

Craft worked the 1997 Major League Baseball All-Star Game, the 2003 American League Championship Series, and two Division Series (1998 and 2000). He umpired in two MLB no-hitters. In 1990, he was on the field when Dave Stewart threw a no-hitter against the Toronto Blue Jays. In 1993, Jim Abbott did the same against the Cleveland Indians. He was also the home plate umpire when Rickey Henderson broke Ty Cobb's American League stolen base record.

In 2001, Craft suffered a knee injury that cut his season short. After having surgery for the injury, he developed a blood clot that kept him out of action until July 2002. After rehab games in the Florida State League where he worked with future MLB umpire Mike Estabrook, Craft rejoined the crew of John Shulock, Mike Everitt and Doug Eddings.

== Personal life ==
Craft lives in Colorado. He has a wife and two children. He attended Shawnee State University.

== See also ==
- List of Major League Baseball umpires (disambiguation)
