= Tim Stoddard =

American baseball player (born 1953)

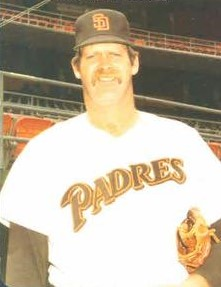
- Pitcher
- Born: January 24, 1953 (age 73); East Chicago, Indiana, U.S.
- Batted: Right Threw: Right

MLB debut
- September 7, 1975, for the Chicago White Sox

Last MLB appearance
- July 9, 1989, for the Cleveland Indians

MLB statistics
- Win–loss record: 41–35
- Earned run average: 3.95
- Strikeouts: 582
- Saves: 76
- Stats at Baseball Reference

Teams
- Chicago White Sox (1975); Baltimore Orioles (1978–1983); Chicago Cubs (1984); San Diego Padres (1985–1986); New York Yankees (1986–1988); Cleveland Indians (1989)

Career highlights and awards
- World Series champion (1983)

Timothy Paul Stoddard (born January 24, 1953) is an American former professional baseball pitcher. A right-handed pitcher, he played for six different teams in Major League Baseball between 1975 and 1989, and was a member of the 1983 Baltimore Orioles championship team. He is currently the pitching coach for the baseball team at North Central College. Stoddard is one of only two men to have played in both a World Series and a Final Four of the NCAA Men's Division I Basketball Championship, along with fellow East Chicago Washington High School alumnus Kenny Lofton.

== Collegiate career ==
The 6-foot-7-inch (2.01 m) Stoddard was born in East Chicago, Indiana. He was a member of the 1971 East Chicago Washington High School Senators basketball team, which went undefeated (29–0) and won the Indiana state high school basketball championship. Among his teammates were Pete Trgovich (who played at UCLA) and Junior Bridgeman (who played at Louisville and in the NBA).

Stoddard attended North Carolina State University (NC State) where he was a two-sport athlete, playing baseball under Coach Sammy Esposito and basketball under Coach Norm Sloan.

Stoddard pitched collegiately for NC State from 1972 to 1975. Stoddard was 12–3 in 1974 and ranks fourth on the college's single-season earned run average (ERA) list with a 1.05 ERA for the 1975 season. The team won three ACC Championships in Stoddard's four seasons.

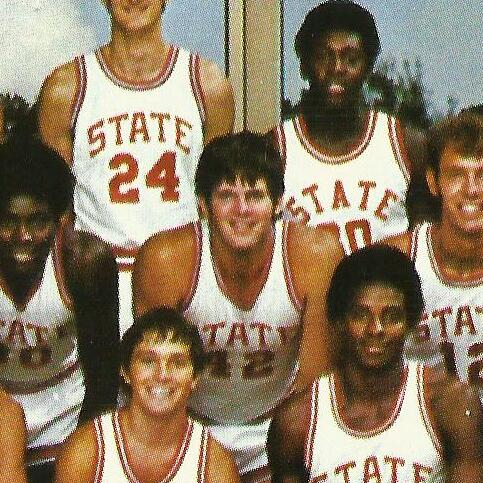
Stoddard (center) with the 1973–74 NC State Wolfpack men's basketball team

In basketball, Stoddard was a starting forward on the 1973–74 Wolfpack's NCAA Basketball Champions under Coach Sloan, where he was teammates with Basketball Hall-of-Famer David Thompson. The Wolfpack went 30–1 on the season, the lone loss coming to the Bill Walton-led UCLA Bruins. The Wolfpack gained revenge in the NCAA Tournament and defeated UCLA in the Final Four, ending UCLA's seven-year run as national champions. Stoddard had 9 points and 9 rebounds in the 80–77 double-overtime semifinal victory. Stoddard had 8 points and 7 rebounds in the 76–64 victory in the championship game against Marquette University. For his collegiate basketball career, Stoddard averaged 6.3 points and 4.9 rebounds per game, including 5.6 points and 4.8 rebounds in the championship season.

== Professional career ==
=== Chicago White Sox (1975–1977) ===
In January 1975, Stoddard was drafted by the Chicago White Sox in the second round of the January draft after playing collegiate baseball at North Carolina State. He made his professional debut in 1975, pitching for the Class AA Knoxville Sox, where he went 3–4, with a 4.23 ERA and 7 saves. In 1976, he pitched for Knoxville and the Class AAA Iowa Oaks. He first reached the majors in 1975, with one appearance.

=== Baltimore Orioles (1977–1983) ===
Stoddard signed with the Baltimore Orioles on April 8, 1977, eleven days after his release by the White Sox on March 28. He pitched the 1977 season with the Orioles' Class AA Charlotte O's going 10–7 with a 3.21 ERA and 5 saves. In 1978, Stoddard was promoted to the Class AAA Rochester Red Wings, where he was 7–3 with a 2.61 ERA and 7 saves.

After a second brief majors call up in 1978, Stoddard made a major-league roster for good in 1979 with the Baltimore Orioles; that year, he pitched in 29 games, winning three and saving three others, with a 1.71 ERA in 58 innings pitched. The 1979 Orioles won the American League pennant, before losing to the Pittsburgh Pirates in the World Series. In Game Four, Stoddard was the winning pitcher and drove in Billy Smith with an eighth-inning single.

Stoddard became the Orioles’ closer in 1980, pitching in a career-high 64 games and finishing fourth in the AL with 26 saves, which stood as a single-season franchise record until Don Aase broke it with 34 saves in 1986. Over the next three years, Stoddard shared the closer role with left-hander Tippy Martinez. In 1983, his ERA ballooned to 6.09.

In 1983, Stoddard was a member of the Orioles 1983 World Series champions. Stoddard did not pitch in the World Series, which the Orioles won over the Philadelphia Phillies in five games. Stoddard became the first player to win a championship ring in both an NCAA basketball championship game and a World Series.

=== Chicago Cubs (1984) ===
Stoddard was traded from the Orioles to the Oakland Athletics for Wayne Gross on December 9, 1983. He was dealt again during spring training on March 26, 1984, from the Athletics to the Chicago Cubs for Stan Kyles, with minor league outfielder Stan Boderick also sent to Oakland to complete the transaction five days later. During the 1984 season, Stoddard pitched in 58 games and posted a 10–6 record and seven saves as the Cubs won the National League East title—their first postseason appearance since the 1945 World Series. The Cubs, however, lost to the San Diego Padres in the National League Championship Series. After the season, Stoddard signed with the Padres as a free agent. The compensation draft pick that the Cubs received for losing Stoddard in free-agency was later used to draft Rafael Palmeiro.

=== San Diego Padres (1985–1986) ===
While pitching for the Padres, on June 18, 1986, Stoddard hit his only major-league home run in what turned out to be his final major-league at bat. After pitching for the Padres for a year and a half, Stoddard was traded to the New York Yankees on July 9, 1986, for Ed Whitson.

=== New York Yankees (1986–1988) ===
Stoddard served mainly as a Yankee setup man for closer Dave Righetti. While pitching against the California Angels on September 5, 1987, Stoddard gave up the first-ever "broken bat" home run to Jack Howell. Stoddard was released by the Yankees on August 14, 1988, after posting a 6.38 ERA.

=== Cleveland Indians (1989) ===
Stoddard pitched his final season with the Cleveland Indians, pitching in 14 games with a 2.95 ERA before being released on July 12, 1989.

In his major-league career, Stoddard pitched in 485 games, all in relief. He won 41 games against 35 losses, with 79 saves, a 3.95 ERA and 582 strikeouts in 729 2/3 innings pitched. As a batter, he recorded two hits in 20 major-league at bats for a .100 batting average.

== Personal life ==
Stoddard is one of only two men (the other being Kenny Lofton) to play in both an NCAA Basketball Final Four game, and an MLB World Series. He has been inducted into the Chicagoland Sports Hall of Fame, the Indiana Baseball Hall of Fame, and the Indiana Basketball Hall of Fame.

Stoddard appeared in the 1988 movie Big. He served as the baseball adviser and portrayed a Dodgers pitcher in the 1993 film Rookie of the Year.

Stoddard served as the pitching coach at Northwestern University for 22 seasons. 19 of his pitchers went on to be major-league draft selections, including Mike Koplove, J. A. Happ, George Kontos and Luke Farrell. He joined North Central College in Naperville, Illinois, as the pitching coach in 2016.

== See also ==
- List of Major League Baseball players with a home run in their final major league at bat
