= Emilio A. De La Garza =

Marine Corps Medal of Honor recipient

Emilio Albert De La Garza, Jr.
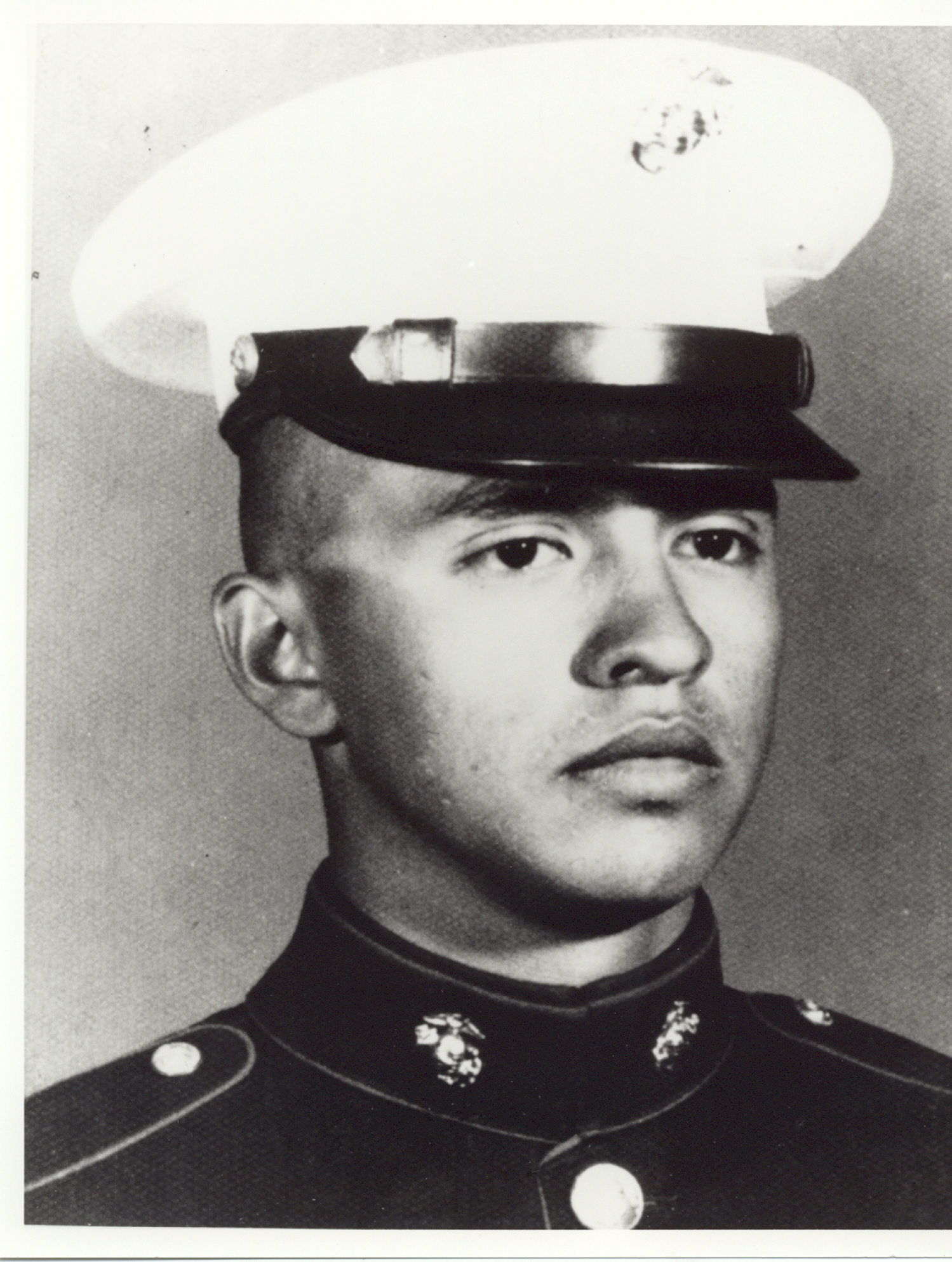
- Emilio A. De La Garza, Jr., Medal of Honor recipient
- Born: June 23, 1949; East Chicago, Indiana, U.S.
- Died: April 11, 1970 (aged 20); Danang, South Vietnam
- Burial place: Saint John Saint Joseph Catholic Cemetery, Hammond, Indiana
- Military career
- Allegiance: United States of America
- Branch: United States Marine Corps
- Service years: 1969–1970
- Rank: Lance Corporal
- Units: Company E, 2nd Battalion 1st Marines
- Conflicts: Vietnam War †
- Awards: Medal of Honor; Purple Heart Medal; Combat Action Ribbon

Emilio Albert De La Garza Jr. (June 23, 1949 – April 11, 1970) was a United States Marine Corps lance corporal who was posthumously presented the nation's highest military honor – the Medal of Honor – for heroism above and beyond the call of duty on April 11, 1970, in South Vietnam during the Vietnam War.

== Early years ==
Emilio Albert De La Garza Jr., a Mexican-American, was born to Emilio and Carmen De La Garza on June 23, 1949, in East Chicago, Indiana. He graduated from E.C. Washington High School in 1968. Emilio Sr. was a World War II veteran who served in the Army from 1943 to 1945. His brother, Guadalupe, served in the Marine Corps from 1978 to 1985. Emilio Jr. was married to Rosemary Rejon, and they have a daughter Renee (Lugo). Emilio Jr. was employed by Inland Steel Company in East Chicago (Indiana Harbor), Indiana, before enlisting in the Marine Corps.

== Marine Corps service ==
De La Garza enlisted in the United States Marine Corps on February 4, 1969, in Chicago, Illinois. He received recruit training with the 2nd Recruit Training Battalion, Recruit Training Regiment at the MCRD San Diego, California.

Upon completion of recruit training, De La Garza was ordered to the Marine Corps Base, Camp Pendleton, California, where he joined the 2nd Infantry Training Regiment (ITR) and underwent individual combat training with the 1st and 2nd Battalions, and weapons training with the Basic Infantry Training Battalion.

Promoted to Private First Class on July 1, 1969, De La Garza arrived in the Republic of Vietnam on July 25 for duty as a machinegun team ammo carrier with Company H, 2nd Battalion, 3rd Marine Regiment, 3rd Marine Division. On September 29, he was reassigned to the 1st Marine Division and served as a Marine Corps exchange man with Headquarters and Service Company, 2nd Battalion, 1st Marines, until the following December. De La Garza was promoted to Lance Corporal on February 1, 1970.

LCpl. De La Garza joined Company E, 2nd Battalion, 1st Marine Regiment, 1st Marine Division. On April 11, 1970, LCpl. De La Garza was serving as a machine gunner on a squad night patrol with Company E, 3rd platoon, approximately four miles south of Da Nang. The Marine rifle squad took hit and run fire in the morning and pursued the enemy. De La Garza spotted one of the Viet Cong (VC) hidden in a deep pond and went into the water with his knife taking the VC prisoner. As the VC was being brought to the shore by De La Garza to the other Marines, the VC pulled out a hidden grenade at the shoreline. De La Garza yelled "Grenade" and was killed as he struggled with the VC in order to save the other Marines from the grenade blast.

== Military awards ==
De La Garza's awards and decorations include:

Medal of Honor	Purple Heart Medal	Combat Action Ribbon
Navy Presidential Unit Citation	National Defense Service Medal	Vietnam Service Medal w/ two 3/16" bronze stars
Republic of Vietnam Meritorious Unit Citation (Gallantry Cross) w/ Palm and Frame	Republic of Vietnam Meritorious Unit Citation (Civil Actions) w/ Palm and Frame	Republic of Vietnam Campaign Medal w/ 1960– device

=== Medal of Honor citation ===
De La Garza's Medal of Honor citation reads:

"The President of the United States in the name of The Congress takes pride in presenting the MEDAL OF HONOR posthumously to

LANCE CORPORAL EMILIO A. DE LA GARZA, JR.
UNITED STATES MARINE CORPS

for service as set forth in the following

CITATION:

"For conspicuous gallantry and intrepidity at the risk of his life above and beyond the call of duty while serving as a machine gunner with Company E, Second Battalion, First Marines, First Marine Division, in the Republic of Vietnam on April 11, 1970. Returning with his squad from a night ambush operation, Lance Corporal De La Garza joined his Platoon commander and another Marine in searching for two enemy soldiers who had been observed fleeing for cover toward a small pond. Moments later, he located one of the enemy soldiers hiding among the reeds and brush. As the three Marines attempted to remove the resisting soldier from the pond, Lance Corporal De La Garza observed him pull the pin on a grenade. Shouting a warning, Lance Corporal De La Garza placed himself between the other two Marines and the ensuing blast from the grenade, thereby saving the lives of his comrades at the sacrifice of his own. By his prompt and decisive action, and his great personal valor in the face of almost certain death, Lance Corporal De La Garza upheld and further enhanced the finest traditions of the Marine Corps and the United States Naval Service.", said RICHARD M. NIXON

== Namings ==
- American Legion Emilio De La Garza, Jr. Post 508, East Chicago, Indiana
- Ivy Tech Community College, Foundations of East Chicago De La Garza Campus, East Chicago, Indiana
- De La Garza Loop, located in MCAS Yuma, AZ, Base Housing (previously named, "SW Loop").

== See also ==
- List of Medal of Honor recipients
- List of Medal of Honor recipients for the Vietnam War
- List of Hispanic Medal of Honor recipients
- Hispanics in the United States Marine Corps
