= Pete Trgovich =

American basketball player and coach

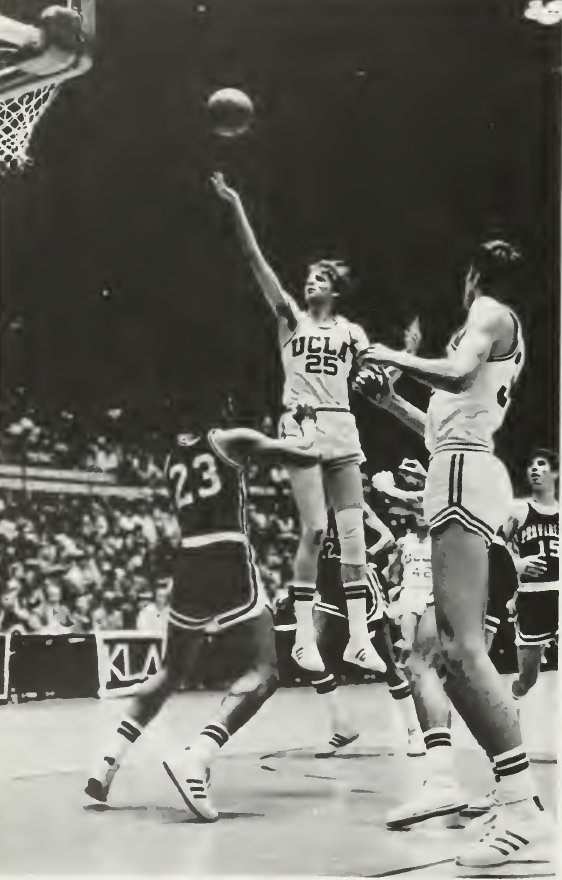
- Trgovich (No. 25) with UCLA in 1972–73

Personal information
- Listed height: 6 ft 5 in (1.96 m)

Career information
- High school: Washington (East Chicago, Indiana)
- College: UCLA (1972–1975)
- NBA draft: 1975: 3rd round, 44th overall pick
- Drafted by: Detroit Pistons
- Position: Guard
- Number: 25

Career highlights
- 2× NCAA champion (1973, 1975)
- Stats at Basketball Reference

Pete Trgovich is an American former college basketball player. He played for the UCLA Bruins, and won two national championships during his career.

Trgovich was a member of the 1971 East Chicago Washington High School Senators basketball team, which went undefeated (29–0) and won the Indiana state high school championship. In the final two tournament wins that season, he scored a combined 68 points. Among his teammates were Junior Bridgeman, who later played professionally in the National Basketball Association (NBA), and Tim Stoddard, who played basketball at North Carolina State University and went on to have success as a Major League Baseball (MLB) pitcher, winning a World Series with the Baltimore Orioles in 1983.

Trgovich played college basketball at the University of California, Los Angeles (UCLA). On their freshman team in 1971–72, he led the team in scoring, averaging 23.4 points per game with a game high of 47. The following 1972–73 season, UCLA was 30–0 won the national championship. In 1974–75, Trgovich helped lead UCLA to another NCAA championship, facing off against his old high school teammate Bridgeman in the national semifinals.

Trgovich was drafted by the San Diego Sails in the fourth round of the 1975 ABA draft. and by the Detroit Pistons in the third round of the 1975 NBA draft.

== Coaching career ==
Trgovich coached East Chicago Central High School to the Indiana AAAA state championship in 2007.

He was the head coach at Indiana University Northwest, from 2007 to 2010.

Trgovich returned to East Chicago Central, where he coached for two seasons from 2015 to 2017 before resigning after a playoff loss in 2017.

== Honors ==
Trgovich was inducted into the Indiana Basketball Hall of Fame in 2011.
