= Kenny Lofton =

American baseball player (born 1967)

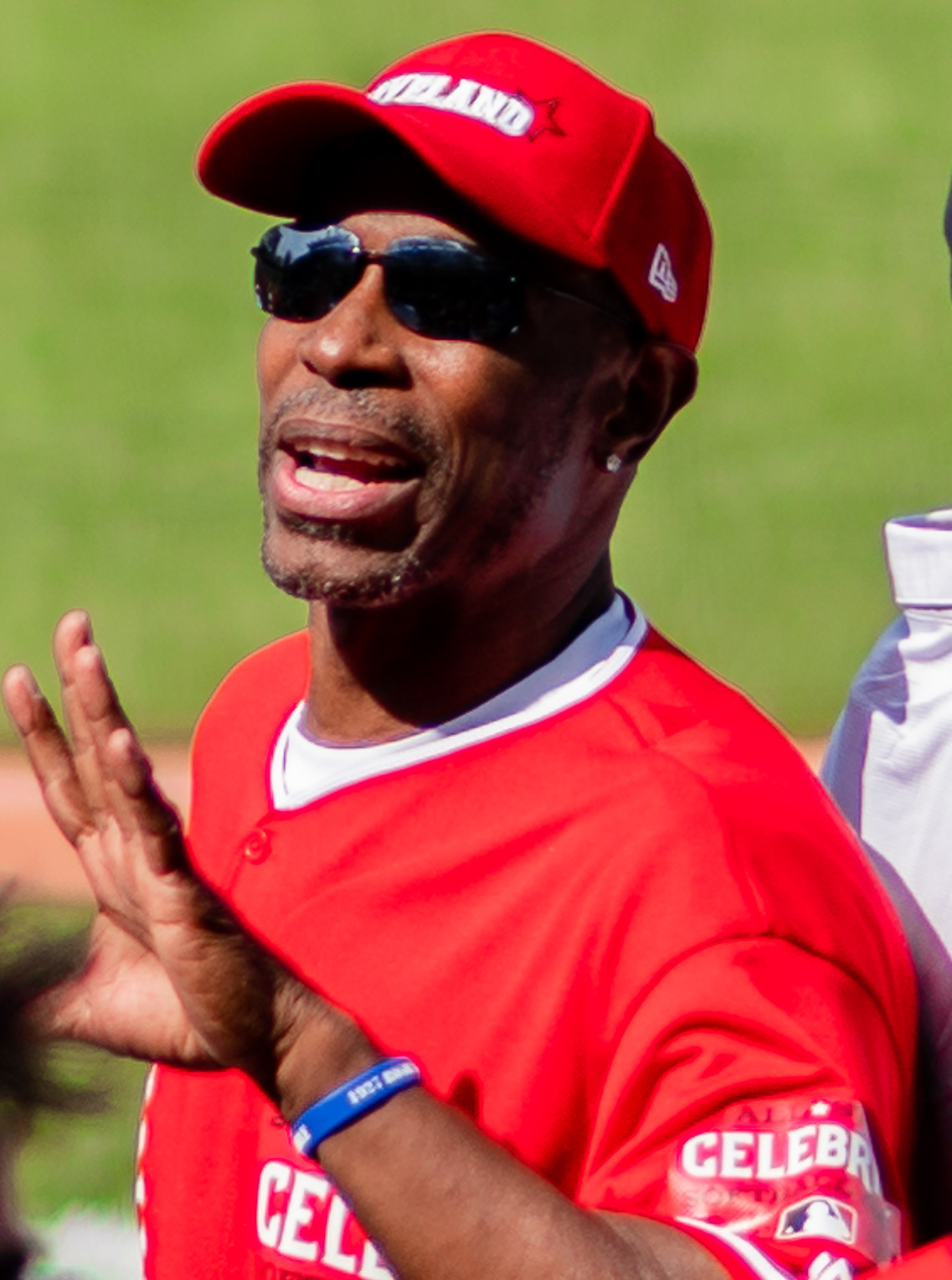
- Lofton in 2019
- Center fielder
- Born: May 31, 1967 (age 59); East Chicago, Indiana, U.S.
- Batted: Left Threw: Left

MLB debut
- September 14, 1991, for the Houston Astros

Last MLB appearance
- September 29, 2007, for the Cleveland Indians

MLB statistics
- Batting average: .299
- Hits: 2,428
- Home runs: 130
- Runs batted in: 781
- Stolen bases: 622
- Stats at Baseball Reference

Teams
- Houston Astros (1991); Cleveland Indians (1992–1996); Atlanta Braves (1997); Cleveland Indians (1998–2001); Chicago White Sox (2002); San Francisco Giants (2002); Pittsburgh Pirates (2003); Chicago Cubs (2003); New York Yankees (2004); Philadelphia Phillies (2005); Los Angeles Dodgers (2006); Texas Rangers (2007); Cleveland Indians (2007)

Career highlights and awards
- 6× All-Star (1994–1999); 4× Gold Glove Award (1993–1996); 5× AL stolen base leader (1992–1996); Cleveland Guardians Hall of Fame

Kenneth Lofton (born May 31, 1967) is an American former Major League Baseball (MLB) center fielder. Lofton was a six-time All-Star (1994–1999) and four-time Gold Glove Award winner (1993–1996), and is ranked 15th among all-time stolen-base leaders with 622. During his career, he played for the Houston Astros, Cleveland Indians, Atlanta Braves, Chicago White Sox, San Francisco Giants, Pittsburgh Pirates, Chicago Cubs, New York Yankees, Philadelphia Phillies, Los Angeles Dodgers, and Texas Rangers.

Lofton attended the University of Arizona on a basketball scholarship. The Wildcats made it to the Final Four in 1988. He did not join the school's baseball team until his junior year.

Lofton made 11 postseason appearances, including World Series appearances in 1995 and 2002 with the Indians and Giants, respectively. From 2001 to 2007, Lofton did not spend more than one consecutive season with a team. For his career, the Indians were the only team he played with for longer than one season and the only franchise he played for more than once. Lofton played 9 1/2 seasons with the Indians, helping the organization win six division titles. In 2010, he was inducted into the Cleveland Indians Hall of Fame.

During his professional baseball career, Lofton's single-season stolen-base count led the American League (AL) on five occasions and all of MLB three times. In 1994, he led the AL in hits, and in 1995, he led the majors in triples. Lofton holds the all-time postseason stolen-base record with 34, having broken Rickey Henderson's record in 2007. Of his base running, Frank White said, "Lofton has out-thought a lot of major-league players" and later, "a smart, complete baseball player."

== Early life ==
Lofton was raised by his widowed grandmother, Rosie Person, in East Chicago, Indiana. His mother, Annie, had Lofton while she was in high school; he weighed just 3 lb (1.4 kg) at birth. His mother moved to Alabama after she graduated and lost contact with Lofton during his childhood. Of his father, Lofton said, "We, as a family, don't even talk about it." Person had glaucoma, and because of her failing eyesight, was unemployed. She refused to go on welfare, but did collect Social Security as a result of her husband's death in 1960 (of bronchial pneumonia). When Lofton made the majors, he built a new home in East Chicago for his grandmother and other family members.

Lofton attended Washington High School in East Chicago and played on the school's baseball team as a pitcher and center fielder. He was an all-state basketball player.

Lofton is distantly related to the actor Cirroc Lofton, who played Jake Sisko in Star Trek: Deep Space Nine.

== College basketball and baseball ==
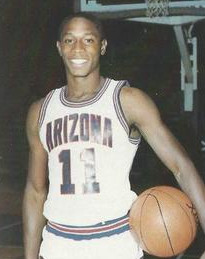
Lofton as a member of the Arizona Wildcats men's basketball team, circa 1987

Lofton accepted a scholarship from the University of Arizona to play college basketball for the Arizona Wildcats. For the Wildcats, Lofton was the backup point guard (to Craig McMillan and Steve Kerr) on a team that made it to the Final Four of the 1988 NCAA Division I men's basketball tournament. He was the starting point guard the following year when the Wildcats made it to the Sweet Sixteen. Lofton is one of only two men to play in a college basketball Final Four (1988) and an MLB World Series. (The other is fellow East Chicago Washington High School alumnus Tim Stoddard.) He left as the Wildcats' leader in career steals (a record eventually broken). "In strength and agility drills, he just killed it. He's a guy who could have played pro football or basketball or baseball," said former Wildcats teammate Bruce Fraser.

Lofton tried out for the Arizona Wildcats baseball team during his junior year. He played in five baseball games and recorded one official at-bat while at Arizona, but his speed and potential were recognized by baseball scouts, including the Houston Astros' Clark Crist. The Astros later selected Lofton in the 17th round of the 1988 MLB draft. He played minor-league baseball during the summer while completing his basketball eligibility at Arizona. The Astros organization asked Lofton to play minor-league baseball in the Florida Instructional League, but Lofton declined, citing a promise he had made to his grandmother to obtain his degree.

Lofton earned a degree in studio production at the University of Arizona while playing minor-league baseball for the Houston Astros. He credits his post-MLB success, as owner of FilmPool, Inc., to that education. Lofton is also a member of Kappa Alpha Psi fraternity.

== Minor league career ==
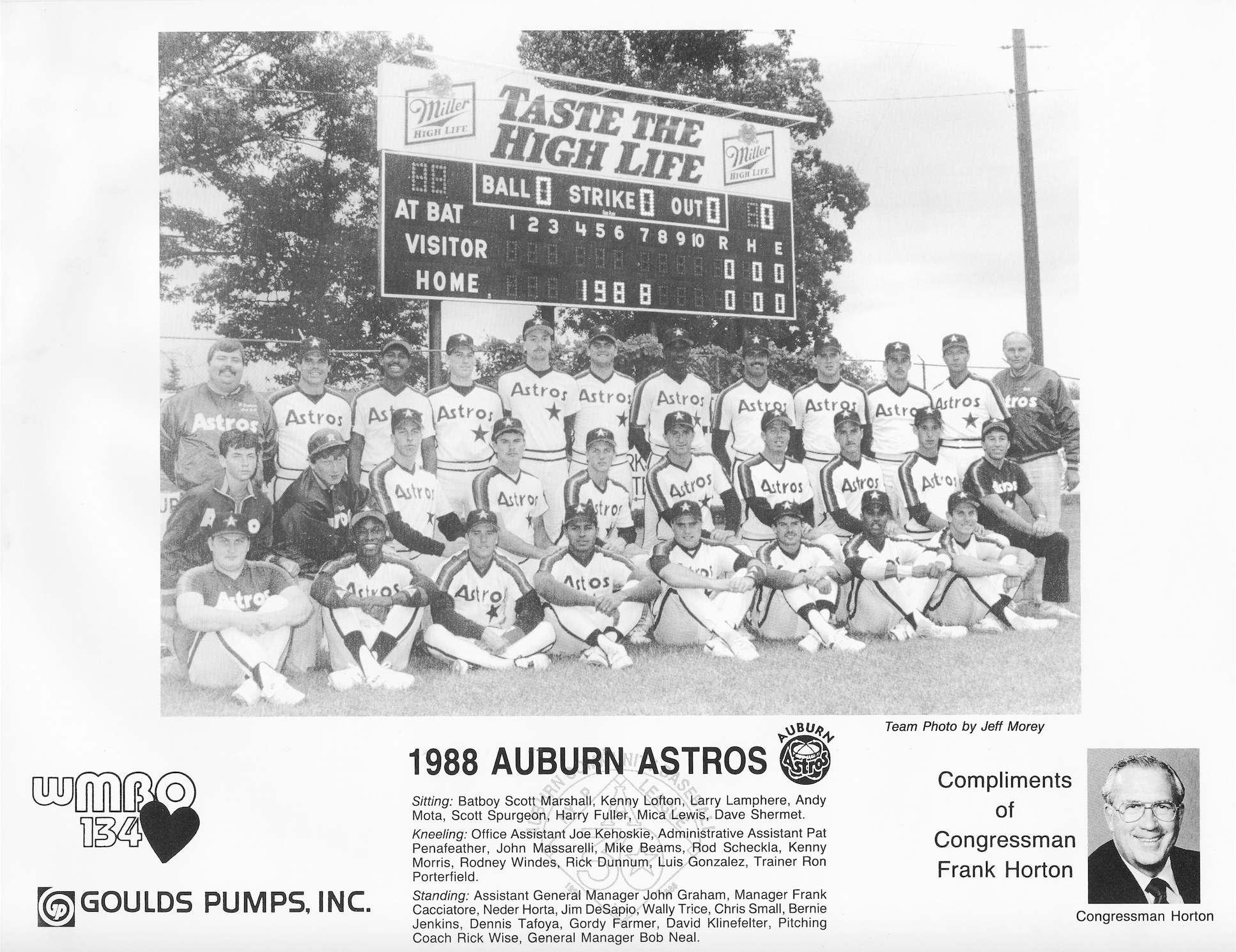
A 1988 Auburn Astros team photo

Lofton batted .214 in 48 games as an outfielder for the Auburn Astros of the New York–Penn League, but recorded 26 stolen bases in 30 attempts. Lofton returned to Auburn in 1989 and hit .263 with 26 steals in 34 games. He then hit .329 with 14 steals in 22 games for the Asheville Tourists in the South Atlantic League. As his college basketball career came to an end, Lofton expanded his baseball skills, finishing second in the league in hitting at .331 while adding 62 steals for the Osceola Astros in the Florida State League. He also drew 61 walks and improved defensively (.974 fielding percentage) and played in 123 games with Osceola.

After spring training in 1991, he went directly to the Triple-A Tucson Toros of the Pacific Coast League. His 168 hits led the league. He hit .308 with 30 steals and 52 walks for Tucson with 19 doubles and a team-high 17 triples. The Toros won the PCL championship and Lofton made the league's All-Star team. On September 14, 1991, the Astros promoted Lofton to the majors.

== Major league career ==
=== MLB season debut ===
In his major league debut with the Houston Astros on September 14, 1991, he went 3-for-4 with a double and scored three runs against the Cincinnati Reds. He hit .203 in 20 games for the remainder of the Astros' regular season. With Steve Finley already serving as Houston's centerfielder, Lofton was traded during the off season to the Cleveland Indians with Dave Rohde for catcher Eddie Taubensee and right-handed pitcher Willie Blair. "I know they gave up on me and now I'm glad they did. One man's trash is another man's treasure", Lofton said of the Astros' trading him.

=== Cleveland Indians ===
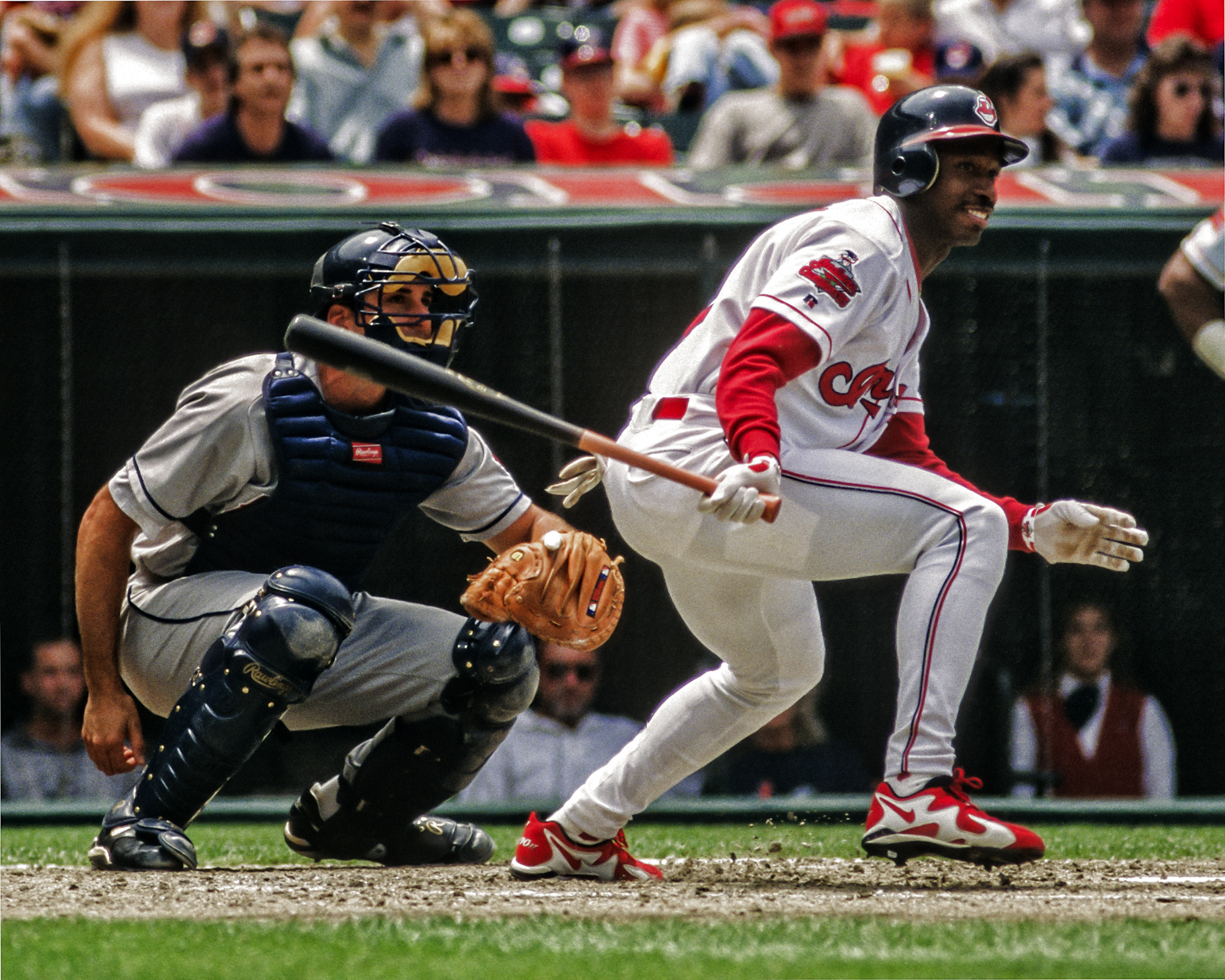
Lofton with the Indians in 1996

During his first season with Cleveland, in 1992, Lofton hit .285. His 66 stolen bases broke the all-time record for an AL rookie and was the most by an MLB rookie since Vince Coleman stole 110 in 1985. His season's stolen-base count, which led the AL, also broke a franchise record (previously set by Miguel Diloné in 1980). Indians first-base coach Dave Nelson helped Lofton refine his baserunning technique and helped him learn how to be successful with bunting. Over his career, Lofton became one of the best bunters in baseball history. Lofton finished second (to the Milwaukee Brewers' Pat Listach) in AL Rookie of the Year balloting. After one season with Cleveland, Lofton agreed to a four-year, $6.3 million contract. The following season, Lofton broke his own Cleveland single-season stolen-base record, recording 70 (which led MLB). Lofton was selected to his first career All-Star Game during the 1994 season.

His development and impact in the league led Brewers manager Phil Garner to say, "I remember how raw he was, and I've never seen anybody develop into that type of player that fast." Garner, who saw Lofton play in the minors, added, "He went from a guy who could hardly get the ball past the infield to a guy who could hit the ball consistently. He always had good speed, but got lousy jumps and didn't run the bases well. He has turned into a dominant player." The regular season was stopped abruptly with the MLB strike, which also led to the cancellation of the World Series. For the season, Lofton again led the AL with 60 stolen bases. His 160 hits on the season were highest in the AL and his .349 batting average was a career-best. He finished fourth in Most Valuable Player Award voting. When the strike began in August, the Indians were in second place by one game in the AL Central to the Chicago White Sox. Indians general manager John Hart said of Lofton, "What a representative for our team and our city. He has the opportunity to be a George Brett-type player here, someone who is synonymous with a franchise." Lofton joined fellow Indians Carlos Baerga, Albert Belle, and Jim Thome to form "the backbone of some Indians teams that were as dominant as any."

In 1995, Lofton was one of six Cleveland starters who batted .300 or higher (.310). He also had an MLB-best 13 triples. His 54 stolen bases led the AL for the third consecutive season. The Indians faced the Seattle Mariners in the 1995 ALCS. In the eighth inning of game six, Lofton had an infield bunt, stole second base, and scored from second on a passed ball between pitcher Randy Johnson and catcher Dan Wilson. The Indians won the game 4–0. It was described by The New York Times as "the run that demoralized the Mariners." Fifteen years after Lofton's crossing of home plate, the Plain Dealer recalled: "Of all the electrifying moments on the Kenny Lofton highlight reel, none captures the essence of the player any better than his 180-foot dash to glory on October 17, 1995." As a result of winning the game, the Indians had won the ALCS and in so doing, Lofton and the Indians had brought the AL pennant to Cleveland for the first time since the 1954 season. "I'm glad for the city of Cleveland to be able to experience this, because they haven't experienced this for a long time. The city of Cleveland has grown a lot, and it's improving, and we tried to do this for the city", Lofton said. The Indians lost the World Series to the Braves in six games despite finishing the regular season with a major league-best 100–44 record in the strike-shortened year. Lofton finished with a .200 batting average and six stolen bases in his first World Series appearance. In 2010, a few years into his retirement, Lofton stated he felt it was the toughest postseason loss of his 11 career playoff appearances, namely because he felt the umpires had favorable strike zones for Braves pitchers Tom Glavine and Greg Maddux.

The following season in 1996, the Indians again had the best record in baseball (99–62) and Lofton's stolen-base total (75) led MLB for the second time in four years. He hit .317 and had a career-high 67 RBIs. The Indians lost in the 1996 ALDS to the Baltimore Orioles in four games.

Near the end of spring training in 1997, Lofton was traded to the Atlanta Braves. On trading Lofton, Hart said, "We had to make this trade based on the fact that Lofton could be a free agent at the end of this season. We went through it with Albert Belle last year, and Albert left and we had nothing in return. We were not prepared to do that again." Lofton, described as "an emotional and offensive catalyst" with the Indians, appeared in three consecutive All-Star games (1994–1996) and won four straight Gold Glove Awards (1993–1996) with the Indians. He led the AL in stolen bases for five straight seasons (1992–1996) and set the single-season Indians' franchise stolen base record (75).

=== Atlanta Braves ===
The Atlanta Braves' Marquis Grissom and slugger David Justice were part of a Braves roster that, heading into the 1997 season, was MLB's highest-paid. Grissom ($4.8 million annual salary) and Justice ($6 million) were traded to the Indians in return for Lofton ($4.75 million) and Alan Embree ($206,000). "This is a trade of enormous magnitude for two very, very good franchises. We're talking about franchise-type players", Hart said. For Lofton, considered "the centerpiece of the Indians' 1990s revival", it was a return to the National League. "The trade will be in the back of my mind for a long time, but it's baseball. It happens to nearly everybody. I'm [in Atlanta] to play every day. It's all Braves from now on", Lofton said. By April 19, the Braves were 13–3 and Lofton's hitting (.453 batting average) had won favor with his new Braves teammates. "If he keeps hitting .400, he'll fit in just fine", said Chipper Jones. From April 8 to April 19, Lofton got 29 hits, placing him second all-time for most hits across 10 games. For the season, Lofton's .333 batting average and 27 stolen bases were team highs (his stolen-base total was to that point a career low). He was caught stealing 20 times, most in the MLB that year. Atlanta won the NL East division with an MLB-best 101–61 record. The Braves swept the Houston Astros in the 1997 National League Division Series (NLDS), three games to none. In the 1997 National League Championship Series (NLCS), the Braves lost to the Florida Marlins, four games to two (the Marlins later defeated the Cleveland Indians in the World Series). For the NLCS, Lofton batted .185 and was one of three Braves' hitters who recorded seven strikeouts in the series. For Lofton, who was eligible for free agency at the end of the season, it was his only season with the Braves.

=== Return to Cleveland ===
Lofton, who was considered the "most sought-after free agent" following the 1997 season, returned to the AL and Cleveland Indians when he signed a three-year, $24 million contract. Happy to return to Cleveland, Lofton said, "It's like I was a ghost for a year. But now I'm back." In 1998, Lofton's batting average dropped to .282, but his 87 walks were a career high, and his 54 stolen bases were double his previous year's 27. The Indians won the AL Central with an 89–73 record and their match-up against the Boston Red Sox, three games to one, in the 1998 ALDS. In the series against the Red Sox, Lofton's .375 batting average led the Indians, as did his two stolen bases and six hits. The Indians lost the 1998 ALCS in six games to the New York Yankees, who had won 114 games in the regular season. Lofton tied for third-most number of hits and strikeouts and his 27 at-bats led the Indians. Lofton finished the 1999 season with a .301 batting average, but stole only 25 bases. The AL Central-winning Indians (97–65) lost in the 1999 ALDS to the Boston Red Sox, three games to two. The Indians had led in the series two games to none before losing three games in a row and the series. Lofton and Roberto Alomar each had two stolen bases in the series, but Lofton recorded just two hits in 16 at-bats. In Game 5, Lofton dislocated his left shoulder and tore his rotator cuff while diving into first base.

On September 3, 2000, in a 12–11 win over the Baltimore Orioles, Lofton tied an MLB record previously held by Red Rolfe when he scored in 18 consecutive games. He tied an Indians' franchise single-game record with five stolen bases and won the game with a 13th-inning walk-off home run. He finished the 2000 season batting .278, recording 30 stolen bases and 107 runs (the sixth time crossing home plate 100 times or more in nine seasons), as well as a career-high 15 home runs and 73 runs batted in. The Indians finished the regular season 90–72 and one game out of the wild card. After missing the postseason in 2000, the Indians returned in 2001 after winning the AL Central with a 91–71 regular-season record. Before winning the division, however, Lofton scored the game-winning run during an August 5 game against the Seattle Mariners; the Indians were down by 12 runs, and became just the third team in MLB history to overcome such a deficit, winning 15–14 in 11 innings. Indians catcher Eddie Taubensee, who was involved in the trade that sent Lofton from Houston to Cleveland at the beginning of his MLB career, caught Lofton after he slid into home plate and jumped with excitement after discovering he had just scored the game-winning run. "I caught him and wasn't going to let him go", Taubensee said. Cleveland won that game against Seattle, but lost their match-up with the 116-win Mariners in the 2001 ALDS. He hit 66 RBIs on the regular season (second-most in his career), but failed to record 20 stolen bases for the first time in his major-league career and batted a career-low .261. Lofton had been treated for a rib-cage problem that had affected his play before the All-Star break. His second stint with Cleveland lasted through 2001, in which his salary was for $8 million in his final contract year with the club. He became a free agent at the conclusion of the season.

=== World Series ring pursuit ===
A free agent in 2002, Lofton signed a one-year, $1.025 million contract with the Chicago White Sox. "I looked at the different opportunities that I had and this was a team that won 83 games last year while they were banged up. Cleveland lost four good players from last year's team, and that's going to be hard to replace. This was an easy decision", Lofton said on signing with the White Sox. White Sox general manager Kenny Williams had stated when Lofton was healthy, like he was during the second half of the 2001 season, Chicago had obtained one of the best leadoff hitters in the game. When the White Sox were paired against the Indians in April during a three-game series at Chicago, the Indians were on a 10-game winning streak and at 11–1, had the best record in the majors. The White Sox ended the streak, and for the series, Lofton was 6-for-14 with six runs scored. "You can't say enough about him, his effort, his intensity. He's been simply amazing", said White Sox manager Jerry Manuel. Lofton appeared in 93 games with the White Sox and hit .259 with 42 RBIs and 22 stolen bases. On July 28, he was traded to the San Francisco Giants of the NL for minor leaguers Ryan Meaux and Félix Díaz.

In the Giants' match-up with the St. Louis Cardinals in the 2002 NLCS, Lofton delivered a key hit to help the Giants win their first pennant since 1989. In the ninth inning, Cardinals manager Tony La Russa summoned left-handed reliever Steve Kline to face Lofton, who had already notched two singles in the game. Giants manager Dusty Baker considered bringing a right-handed hitter to pinch-hit for Lofton, but decided against doing so on the advice of his three-year-old son. Lofton hit a first-pitch single to the outfield, scoring David Bell from second base and creating a 2–1 Giants victory. After the game, Baker remarked, "I just knew Kenny was focused and I know you can't keep Kenny down for too long. That's why we got Kenny over here. He's a big-game player and he's been great in the playoffs." The Giants held a five-run lead in the seventh inning of game six of the World Series against the Anaheim Angels, but eight outs away from winning the World Series, the Angels rallied to win 6–5. The Angels took game seven the following night, with Lofton flying out to Darin Erstad in center to end that game and the World Series, and for the second time in his career, Lofton had lost a World Series.

The Pittsburgh Pirates signed Lofton to a one-year, $1.025 million contract to begin the 2003 season. With the Pirates, he hit .277 and stole 18 bases in 84 games before being traded to the Chicago Cubs, where he was reunited with manager Dusty Baker. When Lofton joined the Cubs in July, he was joining a team that just one season before had lost 95 games. "With Kenny Lofton, we got a quality lead-off man", said Cubs general manager Jim Hendry. In 56 regular-season appearances with the Cubs, Lofton stole 12 bases and hit .327. Lofton and the Cubs won the NL Central division (88–74). The Cubs' postseason berth was just the sixth time since the divisional series format was introduced (1969) that a team made the postseason after having lost 95 games or more the previous season. Chicago beat the Atlanta Braves three games to two in the 2003 NLDS. Lofton hit .286 in the series and led the Cubs with three stolen bases and 21 at-bats. The Cubs, who were up in the series three games to one, held a three-run lead in the eighth inning of game six of the 2003 NLCS. After the controversial Steve Bartman incident took place with one out in the top of the 8th inning, The Florida Marlins scored eight unanswered runs, all in the eighth inning, to win game six and won game seven the following night to eliminate the Cubs. Lofton's .323 against the Marlins led the Cubs' starting line-up, as did his 31 at-bats, and he had the team's only stolen base of the seven-game series.

Lofton was again on the move when on December 23, 2003, the New York Yankees signed him to a two-year, $6.2 million contract. During a Yankees' road game at Cleveland, Lofton recorded his 2,000th career hit. After Lofton's single, Indians fans began an ovation in honor of Lofton. "I didn't know what to expect. I figured I'd get a few claps. It was touching. I tipped my hat, but they just kept going. If there was a storybook way for me to get it, to get it in Cleveland, it was something to remember." New York finished the regular season with an AL-best record, 101–61. To begin the postseason, the Yankees defeated the Minnesota Twins, three games to one, in the 2004 ALDS. In the 2004 ALCS against the Boston Red Sox, the Yankees had built a 2–0 series lead when Lofton stated, "My ultimate goal is for me to try to win a championship. I'm at a point in my career – I've been here for 13 years, and gotten close. This is an opportunity for me to have a chance at it again." Then the Yankees went up in the series three games to none before becoming the first team in MLB history to lose a series after holding a 3–0 series lead.

Lofton, who appeared in 83 games with the Yankees, felt manager Joe Torre did not use his skills appropriately. Lofton finished the regular season with a .275 batting average and a career-low seven stolen bases. With the Yankees looking to reshape their roster and the Philadelphia Phillies looking for a player with postseason experience, Lofton was dealt on December 3, 2004, which as part of the deal also had the Yankees sending $1.525 million to Philadelphia and the Phillies giving up reliever Felix Rodríguez. After the trade, Lofton stated, "It's been very tough. I'm the kind of guy who likes to be settled down. It's been very tough the last three or four years. Everyone in New York understood I wanted to play. I just wanted an opportunity to perform and be a part of the team. I didn't feel as much of a part of the team."

With the Phillies, Lofton hit .335 in 110 appearances, his batting average a team high. He also recorded 22 stolen bases. The Phillies finished 88–74, two games from the NL East division winners and one game out of the wild card. Toward the end of his career, Lofton was featured in a DHL Express TV commercial, where the international shipper comically portrayed Lofton's frequent city changes and subsequent moves.

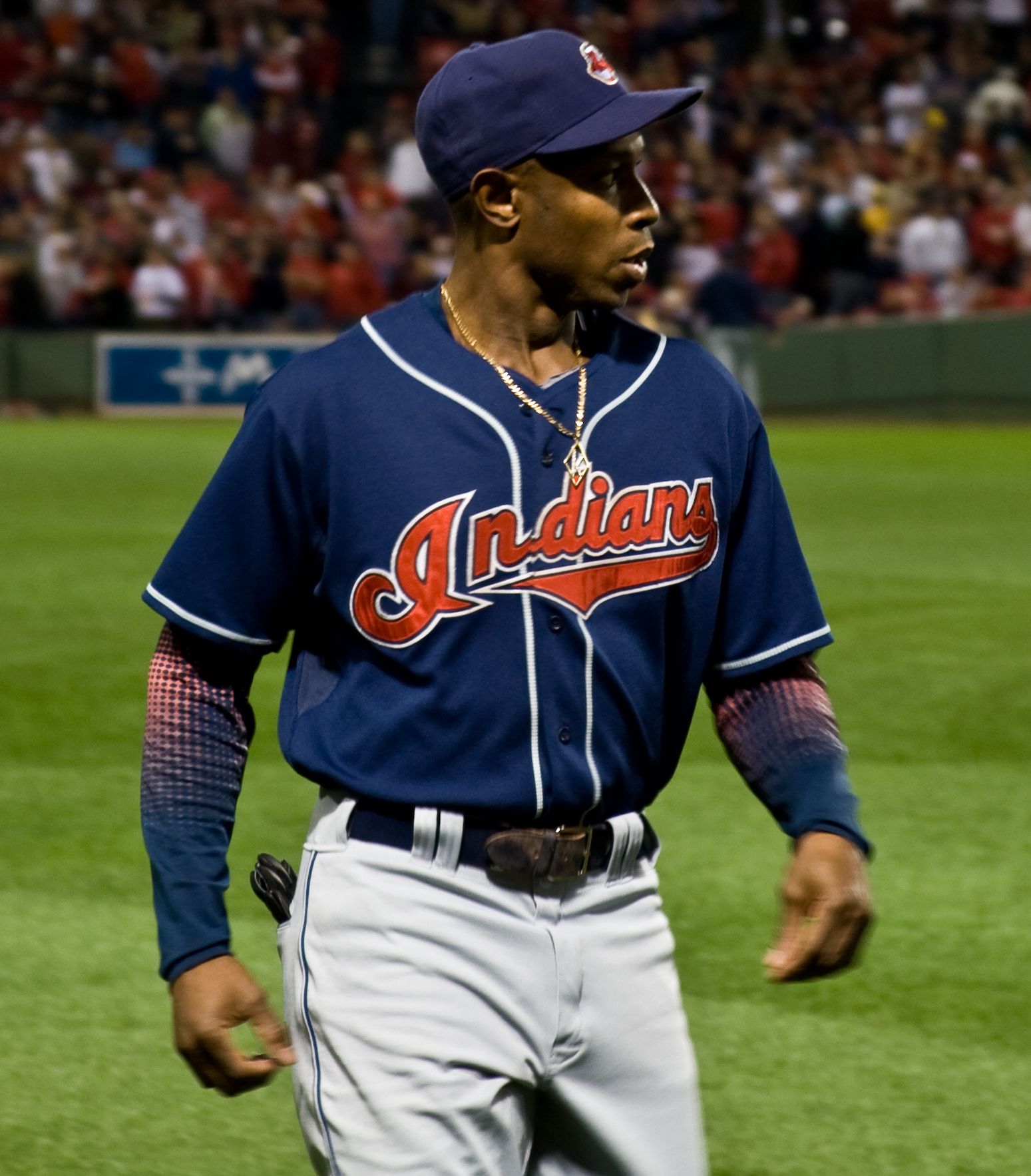
Lofton in 2007

On December 12, 2006, the Texas Rangers signed Lofton to a one-year contract. By signing with the Rangers, Lofton tied Todd Zeile for most teams played for by a position player. In 84 games with the Rangers, he hit .303 with 16 doubles.

On July 27, 2007, Lofton was traded by the Rangers to the Indians in exchange for minor-league catcher Max Ramírez. "That's my biggest thing right now. I'm trying to get a World Series ring," Lofton said on joining the Indians for the third time in his career. The Jacobs Field crowd greeted Lofton with a standing ovation during his first at-bat for this tour of duty with the Indians. Lofton noted, "I missed being in Cleveland... I enjoy Cleveland. It's the city that got me going." In game one of the 2007 ALDS against the Yankees, he went 3-for-4 with four RBIs and one stolen base, which tied him with Rickey Henderson for MLB's all-time postseason stolen-base record (33). In game two, he went 2-for-3 with two walks and scored the winning run in the 11th inning. Then, in game three of the 2007 ALCS, the 40-year-old Lofton hit a two-run home run against the Boston Red Sox' Daisuke Matsuzaka, becoming the seventh-oldest player to hit a postseason home run. Lofton earned his 34th career postseason stolen base in game four of the 2007 ALCS, setting a new MLB record for playoff steals. The Indians, who at one point had a 3–1 game lead over the Red Sox, eventually lost the series. In game seven, Lofton was called out while attempting to steal second base, but the replay showed that he was safe. He was also held up at third base while attempting to tie the game, in a call that was criticized by Cleveland fans for years. Lofton became a free agent at the end of the season, but did not sign a contract with an MLB team. He expressed interest in playing before the 2009 season.

From 2002 to 2007, Lofton played for eight teams and made it to the postseason with four of them. Joe Torre said, after Lofton had been to the playoffs in 11 of the past 13 seasons and played for 11 clubs in his career, "He bounced around a lot of clubs for a reason: They felt he could help them. He did a hell of a job." As Rollie Fingers wrote, "On one hand, Lofton could be seen as a catalyst who magically sparked his teams into playoff contention, but others could say that it was simply a case of top playoff contenders repeatedly seeing him as the final piece of their puzzle."

=== Retirement and Indians Hall of Fame ===
His 622 stolen bases rank him 15th all-time. He holds the Indians' record for stolen bases with 452. Lofton had tallied a .299 career batting average with 130 home runs, 116 triples, and 1,528 runs in 2,103 games. He was also a three-time MLB Player of the Week. Lofton played in 95 postseason games. In the playoffs for his career, he hit .247 with seven home runs and 34 RBI. Baseball historian Bill James named Lofton the "fastest player" and "best bunter" of the 1990s.

On January 27, 2010, Lofton was announced as being selected as a member of the Cleveland Indians Hall of Fame. He was inducted on August 7.

Lofton was eligible for the National Baseball Hall of Fame in 2013, and some have written his career numbers "will likely put him in the conversation of being Hall of Fame worthy". He did not receive the necessary number of votes to remain on the ballot for 2014 and beyond. In 2015, Pedro Martínez, one of the most dominant pitchers of Lofton's era, named Lofton as among the most difficult hitters to pitch against in his career. Lofton falling off the BBWAA ballot after one year despite his career statistics, accolades, and relatively clean reputation during the steroid era has often been considered by baseball fans as one of the most egregious Hall of Fame exclusions in history, and has been used as an example of criticism towards the election process.

== Media career and other endeavors ==
Lofton has his own television production company, FilmPool, Inc. In 1997, he appeared as a guest star on The Wayans Bros., and in 2004, he appeared as a guest star on George Lopez. Lofton co-wrote the song "What If" on Ruben Studdard's 2006 album Soulful. In 2008, Lofton qualified for the American Century Celebrity Golf Classic. He played golf in the off season during his playing days. For the 2011 spring-training season, Lofton was hired by the Indians to coach baserunning and outfield work. He also served as a commentator on the Fox Sports West postgame show for the Los Angeles Dodgers.

== Lawsuit ==
In August 2022, Lofton was sued by a former employee of Lofton's investment company, who claimed that he was fired by Lofton for complaining that Lofton had sent sexually explicit photos of himself to women in the company. The former employee alleged that he was fired in retaliation for complaining about the photos to the company's in-house attorney, and the former employee also claimed that he was not paid for his work.

== See also ==
- Major League Baseball titles leaders
- List of Gold Glove Award winners at outfield
- List of athletes on Wheaties boxes
- List of Major League Baseball career hits leaders
- List of Major League Baseball career runs scored leaders
- List of Major League Baseball career stolen bases leaders
- List of Major League Baseball career triples leaders
- List of Major League Baseball annual stolen base leaders
- List of Major League Baseball annual triples leaders
