= Scott Sheldon =

American baseball player

- Utility infielder
- Born: November 28, 1968 (age 57); Hammond, Indiana, U.S.
- Batted: Right Threw: Right

Professional debut
- MLB: May 18, 1997, for the Oakland Athletics
- NPB: March 30, 2002, for the Orix BlueWave

Last appearance
- MLB: October 5, 2001, for the Texas Rangers
- NPB: July 4, 2003, for the Orix BlueWave

MLB statistics
- Batting average: .235
- Home runs: 8
- Runs batted in: 33

NPB statistics
- Batting average: .255
- Home runs: 34
- Runs batted in: 83
- Stats at Baseball Reference

Teams
- Oakland Athletics (1997); Texas Rangers (1998–2001); Orix BlueWave (2002–2003)

Scott Patrick Sheldon (born November 28, 1968) is an American former professional baseball third baseman/shortstop and right-handed batter who played for the Oakland Athletics and Texas Rangers of Major League Baseball (MLB). He also played for the Orix BlueWave of Nippon Professional Baseball (NPB).

== Career ==
In his 141-game MLB career from 1997 through 2001, Sheldon batted .235, with 8 home runs and 33 runs batted in. He then spent two seasons in NPB, batting .255 with 34 homers and 83 RBI.

On September 6, 2000, while playing for the Texas Rangers, Sheldon became the third player in MLB history to play all nine positions in a single game, joining Bert Campaneris (Kansas City Athletics, September 8, 1965, and César Tovar (Minnesota Twins, September 22, 1968). Sheldon entered the game in the 4th inning and performed the feat in just five frames. He was later joined by Shane Halter (Detroit Tigers, October 1, 2000), and Andrew Romine (Detroit Tigers, September 30, 2017) in the list of players to play all nine positions in the same game.
