= Jorge Velandia =

Venezuelan baseball player (born 1975)

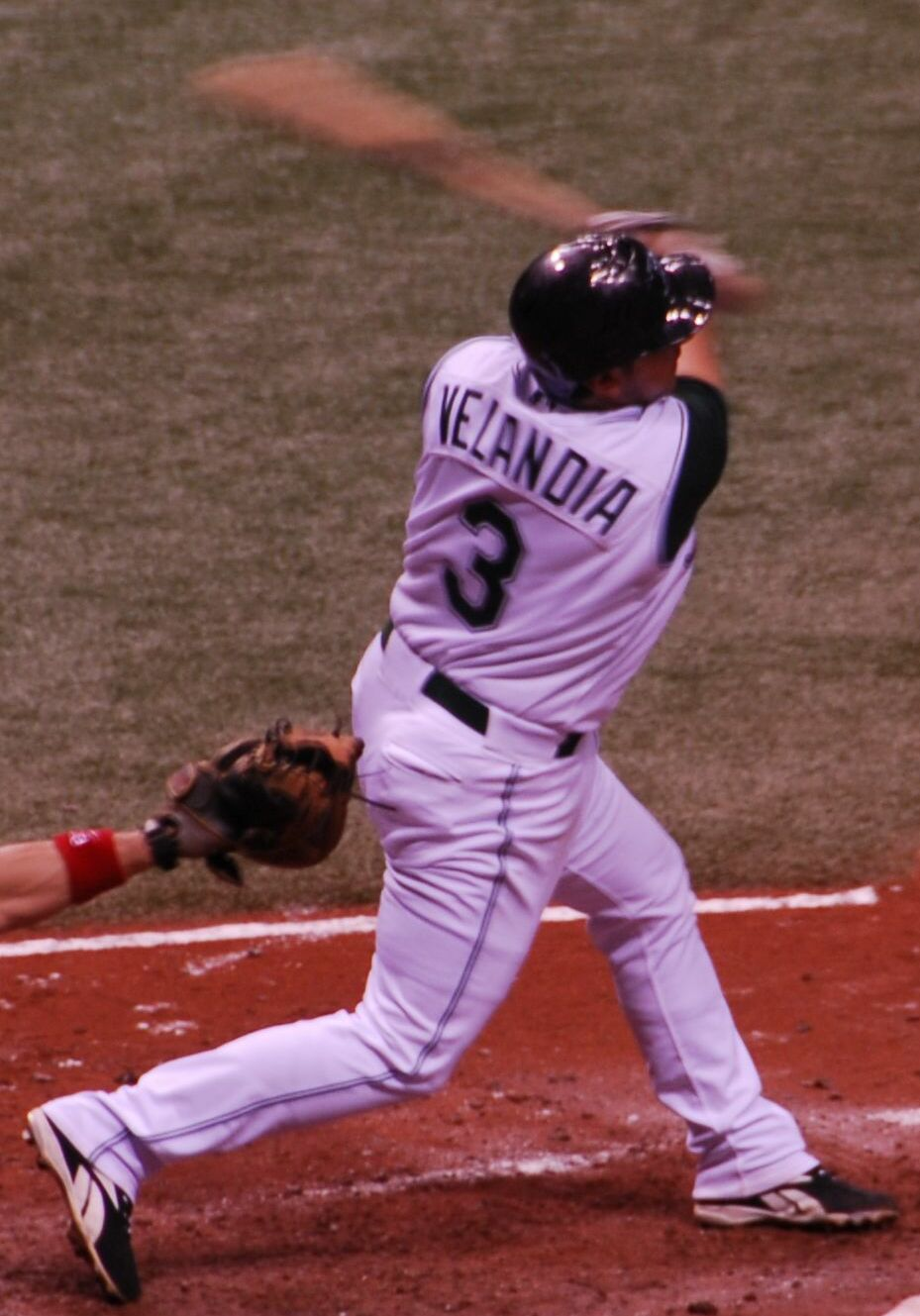
- Velandia with the Tampa Bay Devil Rays in 2007

Philadelphia Phillies
- Assistant general manager
- Born: January 12, 1975 (age 51); Caracas, Venezuela
- Batted: Right Threw: Right

MLB debut
- June 20, 1997, for the San Diego Padres

Last MLB appearance
- July 13, 2008, for the Cleveland Indians

MLB statistics
- Batting average: .189
- Home runs: 2
- Runs batted in: 23
- Stats at Baseball Reference

Teams
- San Diego Padres (1997); Oakland Athletics (1998–2000); New York Mets (2000–2001, 2003); Tampa Bay Devil Rays (2007); Toronto Blue Jays (2008); Cleveland Indians (2008)

Jorge Luis Velandia Macías [veh-lahn'-deah] (born January 12, 1975) is a Venezuelan former Major League Baseball shortstop.

== Playing career ==
Velandia played with the San Diego Padres (1997), Oakland Athletics (1998–2000), New York Mets (2000–2003), Tampa Bay Devil Rays (2007), Toronto Blue Jays (2008), and Cleveland Indians (2008). On December 1, 2006, the Devil Rays signed Velandia to a minor league deal with an invitation to spring training. His first major league home run, which was a grand slam, came on September 25, 2007.

In December 2007, Velandia signed a minor league contract with the Pittsburgh Pirates. He was released by the Pirates on March 29, 2008, and signed with the Toronto Blue Jays two days later. Velandia started the 2008 season playing for the Syracuse Chiefs, the Triple-A affiliate of the Blue Jays. On May 7, his contract was purchased by the Blue Jays, and was added to the active roster. On May 16, he was designated for assignment and declined an outright assignment on May 19, becoming a free agent. Velandia signed with the Cleveland Indians on May 26, 2008, and was assigned to their Triple-A affiliate, the Buffalo Bisons.

He was called up on June 12, to replace the injured Josh Barfield (who had been recently called up himself, for Asdrúbal Cabrera). Cabrera returned a month later, and Velandia was sent back to Buffalo. He was traded to the Tampa Bay Rays on August 31. On January 22, 2009, Velandia signed a minor league contract with the Philadelphia Phillies.

Velandia was the captain of Tiburones de La Guaira in the Venezuelan Winter League until his retirement of active duty in January 2010.

== Coaching career ==
After working for the Philadelphia Phillies as assistant minor league field coordinator, he was announced as an assistant coach for the Phillies upon former manager Ryne Sandberg's resignation on June 26, 2015.

== Front office career ==
On December 22, 2020, the Phillies named Velandia as the team's assistant general manager under Sam Fuld.

On December 19, 2022, the Phillies extended Velandia's contract through the 2025 season.

== See also ==
- List of Major League Baseball players from Venezuela

== Sources ==
- Gillette, Gary; Palmer, Peter; Shea, Stuart, eds. (2005). The ESPN Baseball Encyclopedia. Sterling Publishing Company. ISBN 9781402725685.
