= Rafael Bournigal =

Dominican baseball player (born 1966)

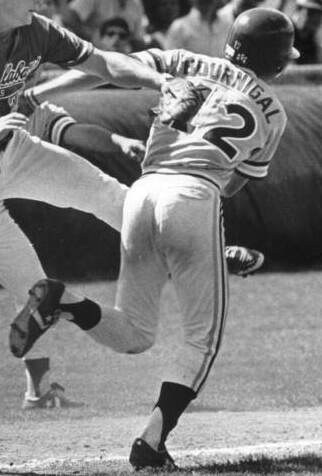
- Bournigal with Florida State in 1987
- Shortstop
- Born: May 12, 1966 (age 60); Azua, Dominican Republic
- Batted: Right Threw: Right

MLB debut
- September 1, 1992, for the Los Angeles Dodgers

Last MLB appearance
- October 3, 1999, for the Seattle Mariners

MLB statistics
- Batting average: .251
- Home runs: 4
- Runs batted in: 85
- Stats at Baseball Reference

Teams
- Los Angeles Dodgers (1992–1994); Oakland Athletics (1996–1998); Seattle Mariners (1999)

Rafael Antonio Bournigal Pelletier (born May 12, 1966) is a Dominican former professional baseball infielder. He was drafted by the Los Angeles Dodgers of Major League Baseball (MLB) in the 19th round of the 1987 draft, and played for the Dodgers (1992–1994), Oakland Athletics (1996–1998), and Seattle Mariners (1999). He played college baseball for the Florida State University Seminoles.

== Playing career ==
The Dodgers drafted Bournigal in the 19th round of the 1987 MLB draft. In 1992, Bournigal won the MVP award and the Jack Perconte Award for his inspirational play with the Triple-A Albuquerque Dukes. Bournigal debuted with the Dodgers that year and was a September call-up in both 1992 and 1993, blocked by shortstop José Offerman. Bournigal was a victim of the hidden ball trick on June 28, 1994, when San Francisco Giants third baseman Matt Williams told Bournigal to step off the base so it could be cleaned.

The Dodgers traded Bournigal to the Montreal Expos in June 1995 for pitcher Kris Foster, but Bournigal did not play in the majors that year. He fractured his thumb later that month, missing several weeks of the season. His best years were with Oakland. In his three seasons with the A's, he started about 36% of their games (173 out of 486), batted .249, and made eight errors.

Oakland released Bournigal after the 1998 season. After signing with the Pittsburgh Pirates then the Texas Rangers ahead of the 1999 season, the Mariners purchased his contract in April.

In 365 MLB games, Bournigal hit .251 with four home runs, 85 RBI, 104 runs scored, and an on-base percentage of .301. Defensively, his fielding percentage was .988.

=== Career highlights ===
- One four-hit game: two singles, a double, and a home run against the Mariners on June 25, 1997.
- Eleven three-hit games, including a single, two doubles, three RBI, and three runs scored against the Detroit Tigers on April 29, 1999, his second game with the Mariners.

== Personal life ==
As a child, Bournigal contracted tetanus after an infection resulting from sliding into second base on a dirt field.

Bournigal's late father, George, was a sports broadcaster in the Dominican Republic.

Bournigal's son, also named Rafael, also played baseball for the Florida State Seminoles as well as Belmont University. Bournigal also has a daughter.
