= Rob Sasser =

American baseball player (born 1975)

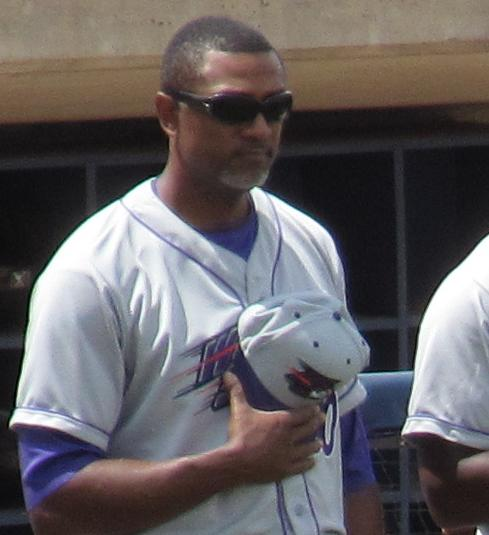
- Sasser with the Winston-Salem Dash in 2013
- Pinch hitter / Coach
- Born: March 9, 1975 (age 51); Philadelphia, Pennsylvania, U.S.
- Batted: Right Threw: Right

MLB debut
- July 31, 1998, for the Texas Rangers

Last MLB appearance
- July 31, 1998, for the Texas Rangers

MLB statistics
- Games: 1
- At bats: 1
- Hits: 0
- Stats at Baseball Reference

Teams
- Texas Rangers (1998)

Robert Doffell Sasser (born March 9, 1975) is an American former professional baseball player. Sasser played in one game, going 0-for-1, in 1998, with the Texas Rangers of the Major League Baseball (MLB). He was drafted by the Atlanta Braves in the 10th round of the 1993 MLB draft. Sasser currently serves as hitting coach for the Kannapolis Intimidators.

In 2012, Sasser joined the Kannapolis Intimidators as batting coach. The Kannapolis Intimidators are the Single-A farm club in the Chicago White Sox minor league chain. Young players, generally one year out of high school or college, become Kannapolis Intimidators. The White Sox also have affiliates in Bristol, VA (Rookie), Great Falls, MT (Short Season), Winston-Salem, NC (A-Advanced), Birmingham, AL (AA), and Charlotte, NC (AAA). The 2011 Kannapolis Intimidators finished the season with an overall record of 76-62.
