= Shane Spencer =

American baseball player and manager (born 1972)

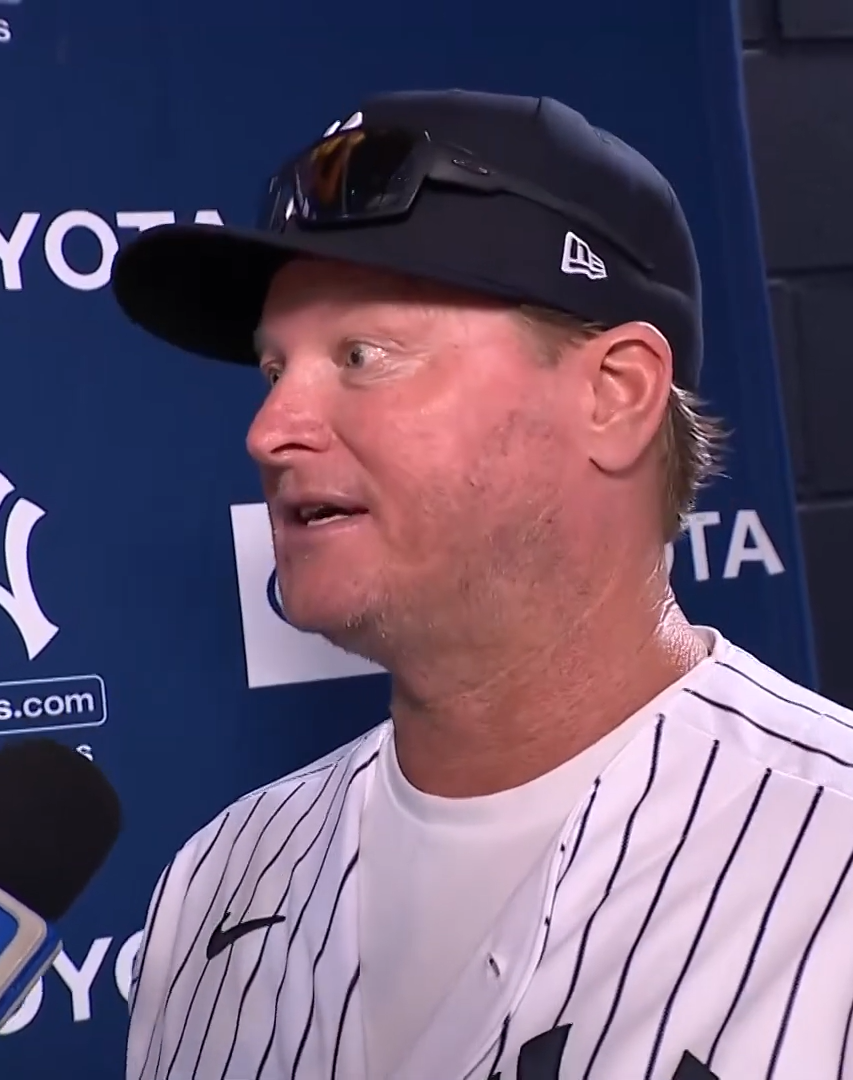
- Spencer in 2023
- Outfielder / Manager
- Born: February 20, 1972 (age 54); Key West, Florida, U.S.
- Batted: Right Threw: Right

Professional debut
- MLB: April 10, 1998, for the New York Yankees
- NPB: April 1, 2005, for the Hanshin Tigers

Last appearance
- MLB: July 22, 2004, for the New York Mets
- NPB: September 16, 2006, for the Hanshin Tigers

MLB statistics
- Batting average: .262
- Home runs: 59
- Runs batted in: 242

NPB statistics
- Batting average: .237
- Home runs: 15
- Runs batted in: 50
- Stats at Baseball Reference

Teams
- As player: New York Yankees (1998–2002); Cleveland Indians (2003); Texas Rangers (2003); New York Mets (2004); Hanshin Tigers (2005–2006); As manager: Nexen / Kiwoom Heroes (2016–2019)

Career highlights and awards
- 2× World Series champion (1998, 1999)

Michael Shane Spencer (born February 20, 1972) is an American former professional baseball outfielder. He played a total of 538 games in Major League Baseball (MLB) for the New York Yankees, Texas Rangers, Cleveland Indians, and New York Mets, compiling 438 hits, 59 home runs, and 242 runs batted in. He also played in Nippon Professional Baseball (NPB) for the Hanshin Tigers.

== Playing career ==
=== Early career ===
Spencer attended Granite Hills High School in El Cajon, California. The New York Yankees selected him in the 28th round of the 1990 Major League Baseball draft. He was a replacement player during spring training in 1995, crossing the picket line during the 1994–95 Major League Baseball strike.

=== New York Yankees (1998–2002) ===
The Yankees promoted Spencer to the major leagues in 1998, at the age of 26. He first played briefly in April, then hit 10 home runs in 67 major league at bats in September, including three grand slams in a ten day span. This was a record for major league rookies, later broken by Alexei Ramírez in 2008. Spencer was nicknamed Roy Hobbs in reference to the protagonist in The Natural, because he hit many home runs and was older than most rookies when reached the majors. He was on the front cover of an October 1998 Sports Illustrated issue.

Spencer led the Yankees with two home runs in the American League Division Series, hitting a solo home run in Game 2 at Yankee Stadium and a three-run shot on the road against the Texas Rangers in the clinching Game 3. The Yankees went on to win the World Series.

Spencer was squeezed out of a regular role on the 1999 team when the Yankees decided to platoon Ricky Ledée and Chad Curtis in left field. He was soon demoted to Triple-A to get regular playing time. In May, Spencer voiced his frustration with the organization. He was up and down with the team throughout the season, also going on the disabled list with an irregular heartbeat. Spencer was ultimately left off the World Series roster. He publicly discussed his frustration with his role on the team with the media.

In 2000, Spencer eventually won back playing time to become the team's starting left fielder. However, he tore the anterior cruciate ligament in his right knee in July, ending his season. The Yankees acquired Glenallen Hill from the Cubs just a few days later.

After rehabbing his knee in the minors to start the 2001 season, Spencer returned to the big leagues in June and homered on his first game back. Spencer homered in the team's first game at Yankee Stadium following the attack on the World Trade Center. Spencer managed to win more playing time in the World Series, edging out Chuck Knoblauch for at-bats.

Following Paul O'Neill's retirement, Spencer was the Yankees starting right fielder to begin the 2002 season. However, by June, he had lost his starting job to rookie Juan Rivera. Spencer instead filled in at the corner outfield spots as needed.

=== Later career (2003–2006) ===
After reaching free agency for the first time, he signed with Cleveland for the 2003 season. In July, Cleveland traded Spencer to the Texas Rangers for outfielder Ryan Ludwick.

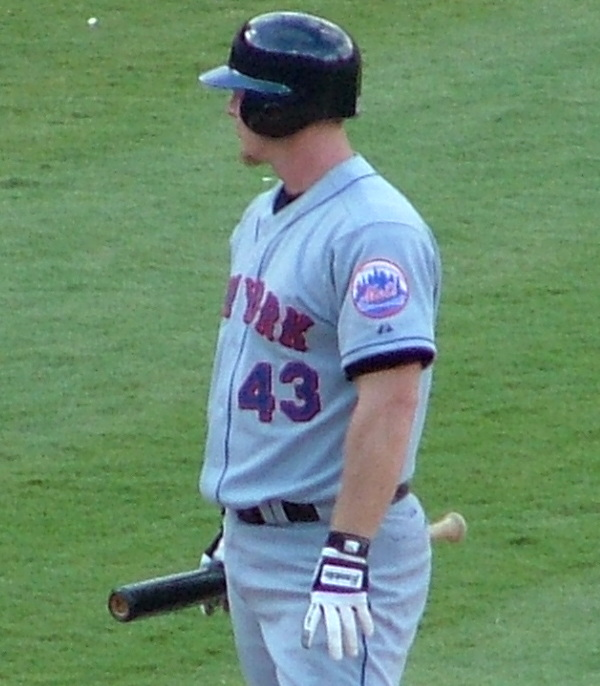
Spencer with the New York Mets in 2004

In 2004, Spencer signed with the New York Mets. In March, during spring training, Spencer and teammate Karim García were involved in an altercation with a pizza deliveryman outside a bar. No charges were filed, but both players were fined. Spencer went on the disabled list in July, after he cut his foot stepping on broken glass in a bar. While rehabbing the injury in Port St. Lucie, Florida in late July, Spencer was arrested on a charge of driving under the influence. The Mets suspended him then released him. The Yankees signed him to a minor league contract in August.

In 2005, Spencer signed with the Hanshin Tigers of Japan's Central League, appearing in 108 games and hitting 9 homers. In 2006, he returned to play for the Tigers, but was released.

== Coaching career ==
After his playing career ended, Spencer became a coach. He served as the hitting coach for the Lake Elsinore Storm, the Single-A affiliate of the San Diego Padres in 2008 and 2009. In 2013, he was named the hitting coach of the Somerset Patriots of the independent Atlantic League. In August 2013, someone claiming to be Spencer admitted to using steroids in a radio interview on ESPN Radio 104.5. The real Spencer called in to Boomer and Carton on WFAN and released a statement to set the record straight. He later had a proper interview with Mike Lindsley on ESPN Radio.

In 2015, Spencer left Somerset to become the manager of the Hwaseong Heroes, the farm team of the Nexen Heroes of the KBO League. He stepped down from his position in 2019 after being arrested for driving under the influence and driving with an expired license.

Spencer worked as an instructor at the Hudson Valley Renegades baseball camp in 2020 and served as a coach for the Saugerties Stallions of the Perfect Game Collegiate Baseball League for 2021 season. In July 2023, Spencer joined the coaching staff of the Irish Wolfhounds, a non-professional team composed of Irish citizens who had prior college or professional baseball experience.

== See also ==
- List of Major League Baseball replacement players
