= Jason McDonald =

American baseball player (born 1972)

- Outfielder
- Born: March 20, 1972 (age 54); Modesto, California, U.S.
- Batted: Switch Threw: Right

MLB debut
- June 5, 1997, for the Oakland Athletics

Last MLB appearance
- June 9, 2000, for the Texas Rangers

MLB statistics
- Batting average: .241
- Home runs: 11
- Runs batted in: 51
- Stats at Baseball Reference

Teams
- Oakland Athletics (1997–1999); Texas Rangers (2000)

Jason Adam McDonald (born March 20, 1972), is an American former professional baseball player who played in Major League Baseball (MLB) primarily as an outfielder for the Oakland Athletics and Texas Rangers from 1997 to 2000.

McDonald attended Sacramento City College and the University of Houston. In 1993 he played collegiate summer baseball with the Cotuit Kettleers of the Cape Cod Baseball League. He was selected by Oakland in the 4th round of the 1993 MLB draft.
