= List of Memphis Chicks (Southern League) no-hitters =

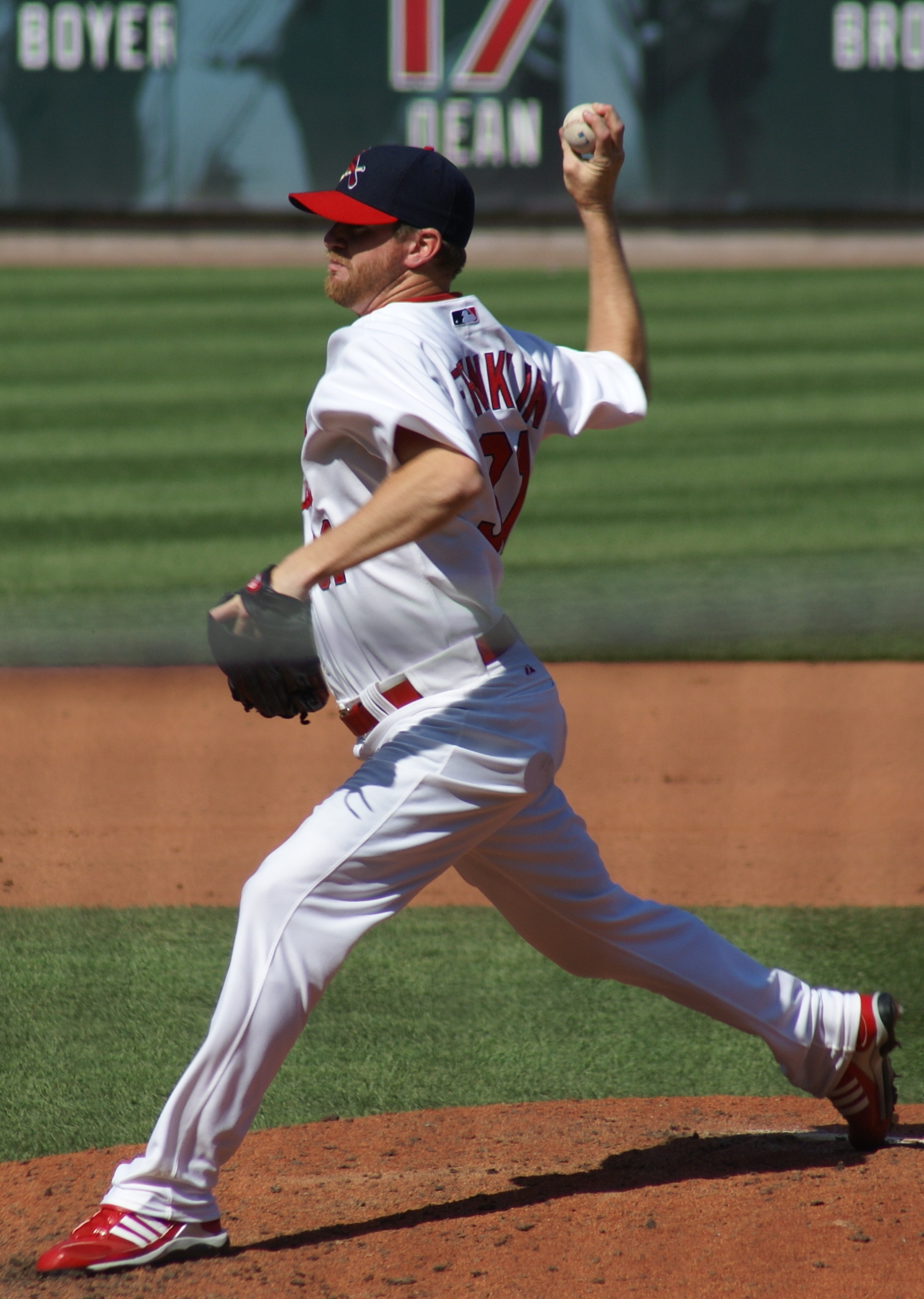
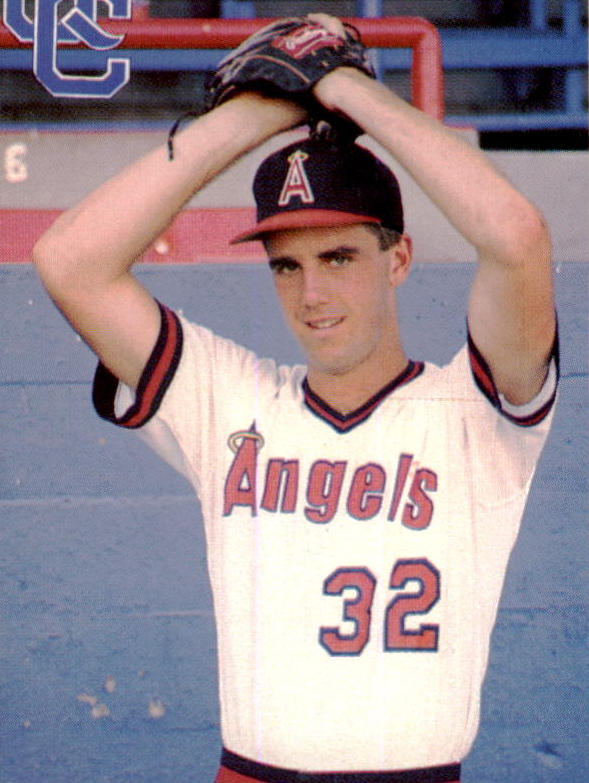
Ryan Franklin (left) and David Holdridge (right) were two of the three pitchers in a combined no-hit effort in a 4–0 victory on April 14, 1997.

The Memphis Chicks were a Minor League Baseball team based in Memphis, Tennessee, that played at the Double-A level in the Southern League (SL) from 1978 to 1997. The franchise was established as an expansion team two years after the departure of the Memphis Blues and had no connection to the original Memphis Chicks of the Southern Association. In the team's history, its pitchers pitched six no-hitters. A no-hit game occurs when a pitcher (or pitchers) allows no hits over the course of a game. A perfect game, a much rarer feat, occurs when no batters reach base by a hit or any other means, such as a walk, hit by pitch, or error. The Chicks did not throw any perfect games.

Memphis' six no-hitters were accomplished by a total of seven pitchers. Five were complete games pitched by a lone pitcher, and one was a combined no-hitter. The Chicks pitched their first five no-hitters at their home ballpark, Tim McCarver Stadium, and the last on the road.

== History ==
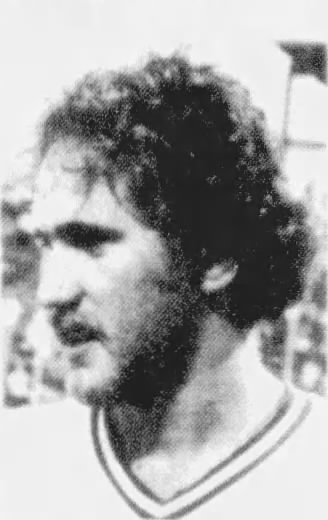
Mike Finlayson threw the first no-hitter in Chicks history on August 20, 1978.

The Memphis Chicks' first no-hitter was a 1–0 win by Mike Finlayson over the Montgomery Rebels on August 20, 1978, at Tim McCarver Stadium in Memphis, Tennessee, in the first game of a seven-inning doubleheader. He walked two batters and struck out two during the game. The contest took 67 minutes, which was the fastest game played at the stadium at the time. The final out recorded was a ground ball hit by Montgomery's Dwight Carter directly to Chicks' third baseman Julio Perez, who fielded it to first baseman Ray Crowley to end the game.

The team's second no-hitter was tossed by Mitch McKelvey on July 2, 1986, versus the Columbus Astros in Memphis, winning 16–0. In the first nine-inning no-hitter in the team's history, McKelvey struck out 12 batters, walked four, and allowed five baserunners. This was McKelvey's debut start for the Chicks after he was promoted from the Fort Myers Royals at Class A. He began the game by striking out two batters in each of the first three innings.

On August 8, 1993, Rodney Myers pitched the franchise's third no-hitter against the Knoxville Smokies, winning the game by a score of 3–0 in the first game of a doubleheader. He struck out six Smokies batters while walking three over the course of seven innings. The no-hitter looked to be in jeopardy during the sixth inning, when Memphis' Michael Tucker fumbled a ground ball at second base hit by Knoxville's Tim Hodge, but it was later ruled an error. That same inning, third baseman Joe Randa preserved the no-hit game with an inning-ending double play. In the seventh inning, Myers struck out the first two batters before a flyout to Kevin Long in center field to finish off the game.

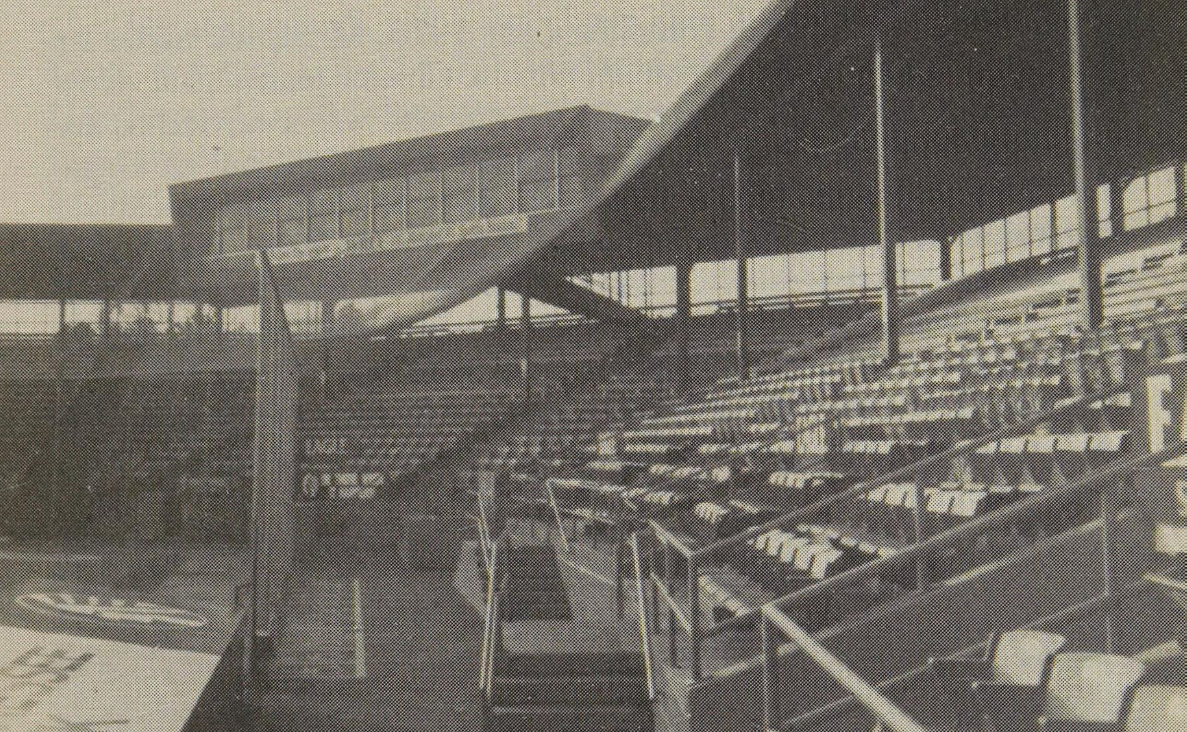
Five of the Chicks' no-hitters occurred at Tim McCarver Stadium in Memphis.

On September 2, 1995, Robbie Beckett and the Memphis Chicks no-hit the Chattanooga Lookouts in the second game of a seven-inning doubleheader. However, Memphis lost the game, 1–0. The Chicks had chances to win, having a runner at third base and no outs in the seventh inning, before three quick outs, including two strikeouts, ended the opportunity. After a wild pitch was committed following a Chattanooga walk, there was a runner at second base for a chance for the Lookouts to seal the win. Memphis manager Jerry Royster decided to intentionally walk Ruben Santana and Dan Rohrmeier to load up the bases, but Beckett's pitching gem ended with a walk-off walk drawn by Adam Hyzdu.

Ryan Franklin (6 Innings pitched (IP)), Scott Simmons (1.2 IP), and David Holdridge (1.1 IP) pitched the team's first and only combined no-hitter on April 14, 1997, winning 4–0 versus Chattanooga at Tim McCarver Stadium, the last no-hitter to happen at the Chicks' home ballpark. Franklin threw 62 pitches, striking out six Lookouts and walking one. Simmons relieved Franklin, striking out three and walking one, and Holdridge also retired three batters on strikes while walking one to complete the no-hit bid. This was the last nine inning no-hitter from the Chicks.

A week later, on April 21, Franklin pitched a no-hitter, winning 6–0, versus the Carolina Mudcats at Five County Stadium in Zebulon, North Carolina, during the first game of a doubleheader. Franklin walked and struck out three Mudcats while facing 23 batters over seven innings, pitching to 13 consecutive hitless innings since the previous game. He continued the hitless streak up to 14.1 innings before it was snapped nine days after the no-hitter on April 30, when the Orlando Rays' Jason Maxwell hit a single with no one out in the first inning. This no-hitter, along with the earlier game a week prior, was caught by catcher Karl Thompson. With the arrival of the Memphis Redbirds, a Triple-A expansion team of the Pacific Coast League, the Southern League Chicks franchise relocated to Jackson, Tennessee, after the season to become the West Tenn Diamond Jaxx.

== No-hitters ==
Key
Score	Game score with Chicks runs listed first
Pitcher/catcher (#)	A number following a pitcher or catcher's name indicates participation in multiple no-hitters.
BR	Number of base runners by the opposing team
(#)	Number of innings in a game that was shorter or longer than 9 innings
£	Pitcher was left-handed

No-hitters
No.	Date	Pitcher(s)	Score	BR	Opponent	Location	Catcher	Notes	Ref.
1	August 20, 1978	Mike Finlayson	1–0 (7)	3	Montgomery Rebels	Tim McCarver Stadium	Randall Schafer	First Chicks no-hitter; First Chicks no-hitter at Tim McCarver Stadium; First game of a doubleheader; Smallest margin of victory in a Chicks no-hitter (tie; 1 run)	
2	July 2, 1986	Mitch McKelvey	16–0	5	Columbus Astros	Tim McCarver Stadium	Terry Bell	First Chicks 9-inning no-hitter; Largest margin of victory in a Chicks no-hitter (16 runs); Longest interval between Chicks no-hitters (7 years, 10 months, and 12 days)	
3	August 8, 1993	Rodney Myers	3–0 (7)	4	Knoxville Smokies	Tim McCarver Stadium	Lance Jennings	First game of a doubleheader	
4	September 2, 1995	Robbie Beckett^{£}	0–1 (7)	6	Chattanooga Lookouts	Tim McCarver Stadium	Matt Schwenke	Only Chicks no-hitter to result in a loss; Second game of a doubleheader; Smallest margin of victory in a Chicks no-hitter (tie; 1 run)	
5	April 14, 1997	Ryan Franklin (1) (6 IP) Scott Simmons^{£} (1.2 IP) David Holdridge (1.1 IP)	4–0	4	Chattanooga Lookouts	Tim McCarver Stadium	Karl Thompson (1)	Only Chicks combined no-hitter; Last Chicks 9-inning no-hitter; Last Chicks no-hitter at Tim McCarver Stadium; Most pitchers used in a Chicks no-hitter (3)	
6	April 21, 1997	Ryan Franklin (2)	6–0 (7)	3	Carolina Mudcats	Five County Stadium	Karl Thompson (2)	Last Chicks no-hitter; First game of a doubleheader; Shortest interval between Chicks no-hitters (7 days)	

== See also ==
- List of Southern League no-hitters
