= List of Southern League no-hitters =

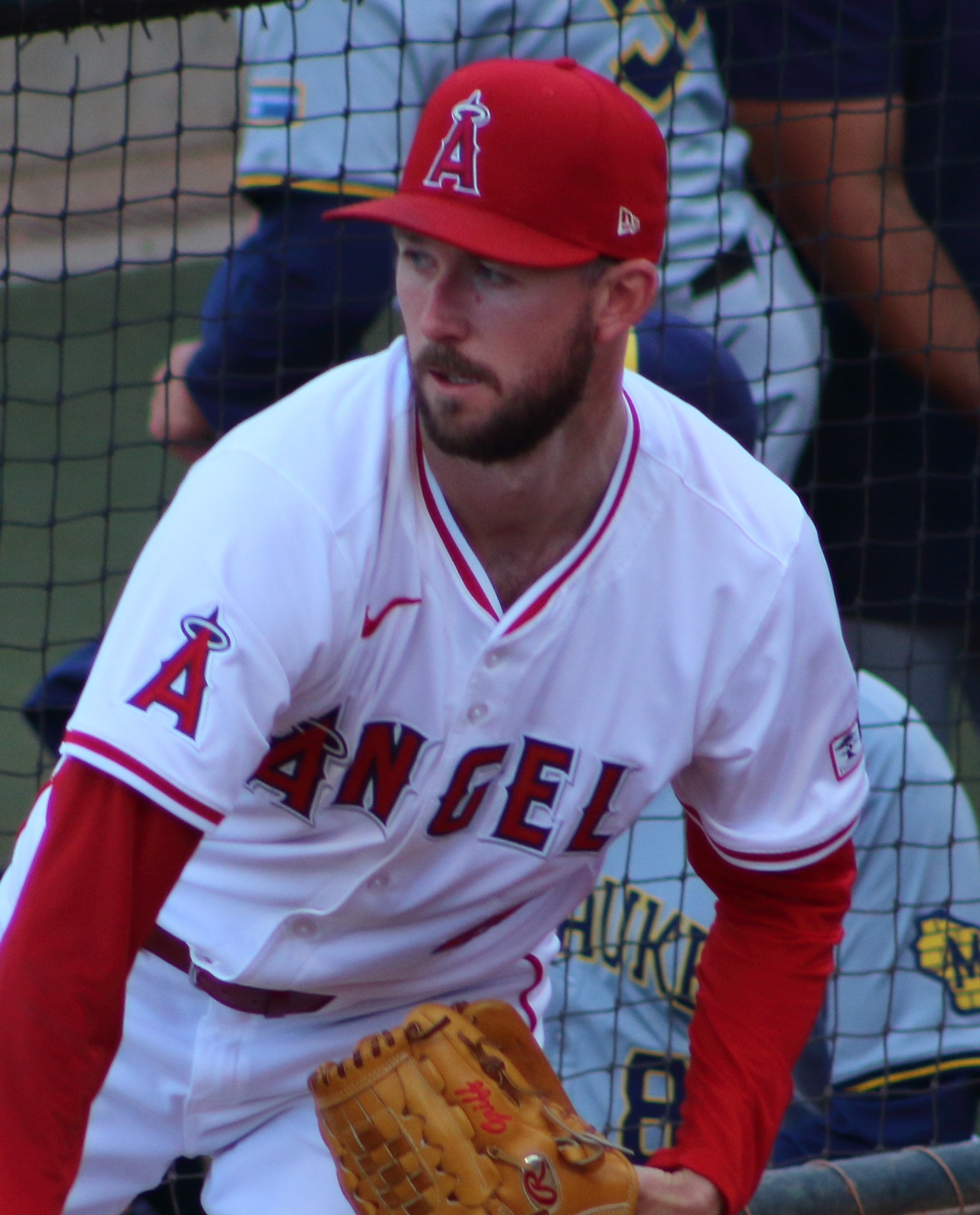
Griffin Canning was the starting pitcher for two no-hitters in the Southern League with the Mobile BayBears in 2018.

Since the foundation of the Southern League in 1964 its pitchers have thrown 101 no-hitters, which include four perfect games. Of these no-hitters, 52 were pitched in games that lasted at least the full nine innings, while 49 were pitched in games shortened due to weather or that were played in doubleheaders, which are typically seven innings. Only two of the league's four perfect games were tossed in full nine-inning games. Thirty no-hitters were combined—thrown by two or more pitchers on the same team.

A no-hit game occurs when a pitcher (or pitchers) allows no hits during the entire course of a game. A batter may still reach base via a walk, an error, a fielder's choice, a hit by pitch, a passed ball or wild pitch on strike three, or catcher's interference. Due to these methods of reaching base, it is possible for a team to score runs without getting any hits. While the vast majority of no-hitters are shutouts, teams which went hitless have managed to score runs in their respective games nine times in Southern League games, some in extra innings.

The first Southern League no-hitter was thrown on May 3, 1964, by Doug Gallagher of the Knoxville Smokies against the Asheville Tourists at Bill Meyer Stadium in Knoxville, Tennessee, as part of a seven-inning doubleheader. The first nine-inning feat occurred on August 11, 1965, when Bill Whitby of the Charlotte Hornets no-hit Asheville at Clark Griffith Park in Charlotte, North Carolina. The first perfect game was pitched on July 6, 1967, by George Lauzerique of the Birmingham A's against the Evansville White Sox at Bosse Field in Evansville, Indiana, as part of a seven-inning doubleheader. The first nine-inning perfect game occurred on August 14, 1970, when Charles Swanson of the Montgomery Rebels accomplished the feat against the Savannah Indians at Grayson Stadium in Savannah, Georgia.

Five league pitchers have participated in multiple Southern League no-hitters. Jimmie Brown, who pitched two for the Montgomery Rebels in 1968, is the only pitcher with two solo no-hit games. Griffin Canning (both in 2018), Ryan Clark (both in 2018), Ryan Franklin (both in 1997), and Eric Torres (2022 and 2023) have each participated in two combined no-hitters. Franklin's were made in back-to-back starts with the Memphis Chicks, with the second being a solo affair. Canning and Clark were the starting and closing pitchers, respectively, for the same no-hit games with the Mobile BayBears.

The team with the most no-hitters is the Knoxville Smokies, with 11. They are followed by the Birmingham Barons (9 no-hitters, 1 a perfect game) and the Jacksonville Suns (9 no-hitters). Four teams (Birmingham, the Montgomery Rebels, Orlando Rays, and Pensacola Blue Wahoos) have each thrown one perfect game.

== No-hitters ==
Key
Score	Game score with no-hitter team's runs listed first
Location	Stadium in italics denotes a no-hitter thrown in a home game.
Score (#)	A number following a score indicates number of innings in a game that was shorter or longer than 9 innings.
Pitcher (#)	A number following a pitcher's name indicates multiple no-hitters thrown.
IP	Innings pitched
†	Indicates a perfect game

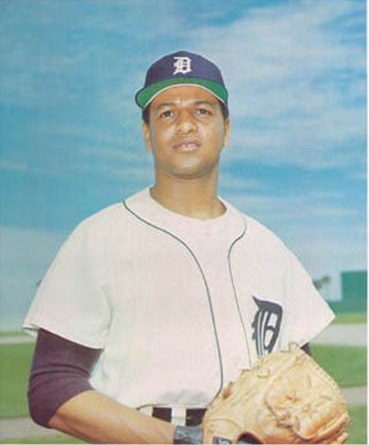
Les Cain pitched a no-hitter with the Montgomery Rebels on July 22, 1967.

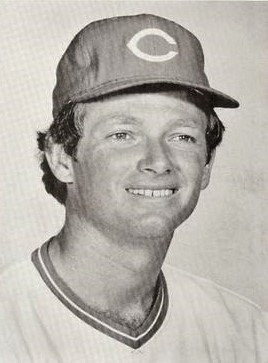
Pat Darcy threw the first of two no-hit games for the Columbus Astros in 1971.

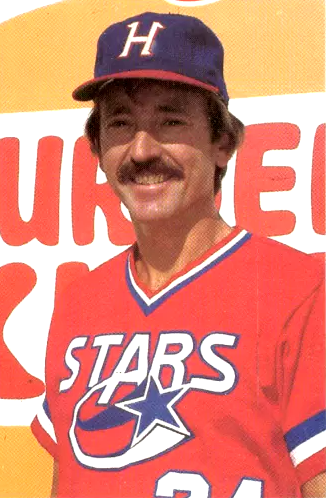
Gary Lance tossed a no-hitter with the Jacksonville Suns on August 26, 1973.

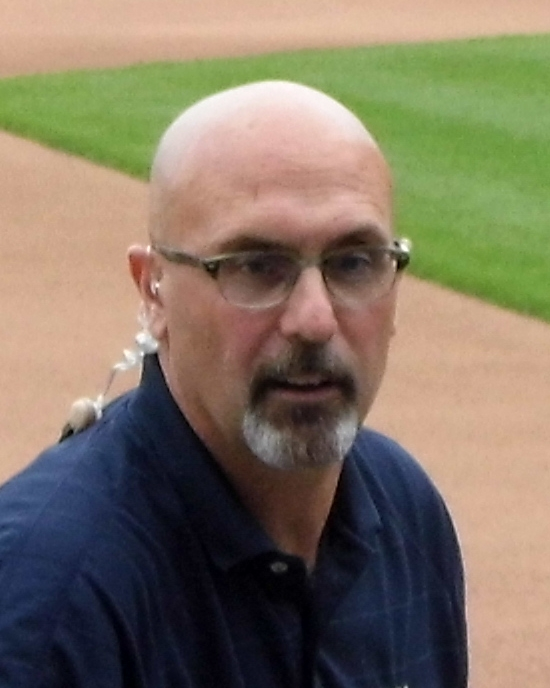
Jim Deshaies pitched a no-hitter for the Nashville Sounds on May 4, 1984, despite allowing a run.

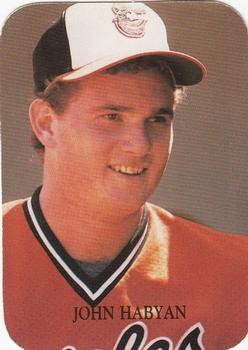
John Habyan threw a no-hitter for the Charlotte O's on May 13, 1985.

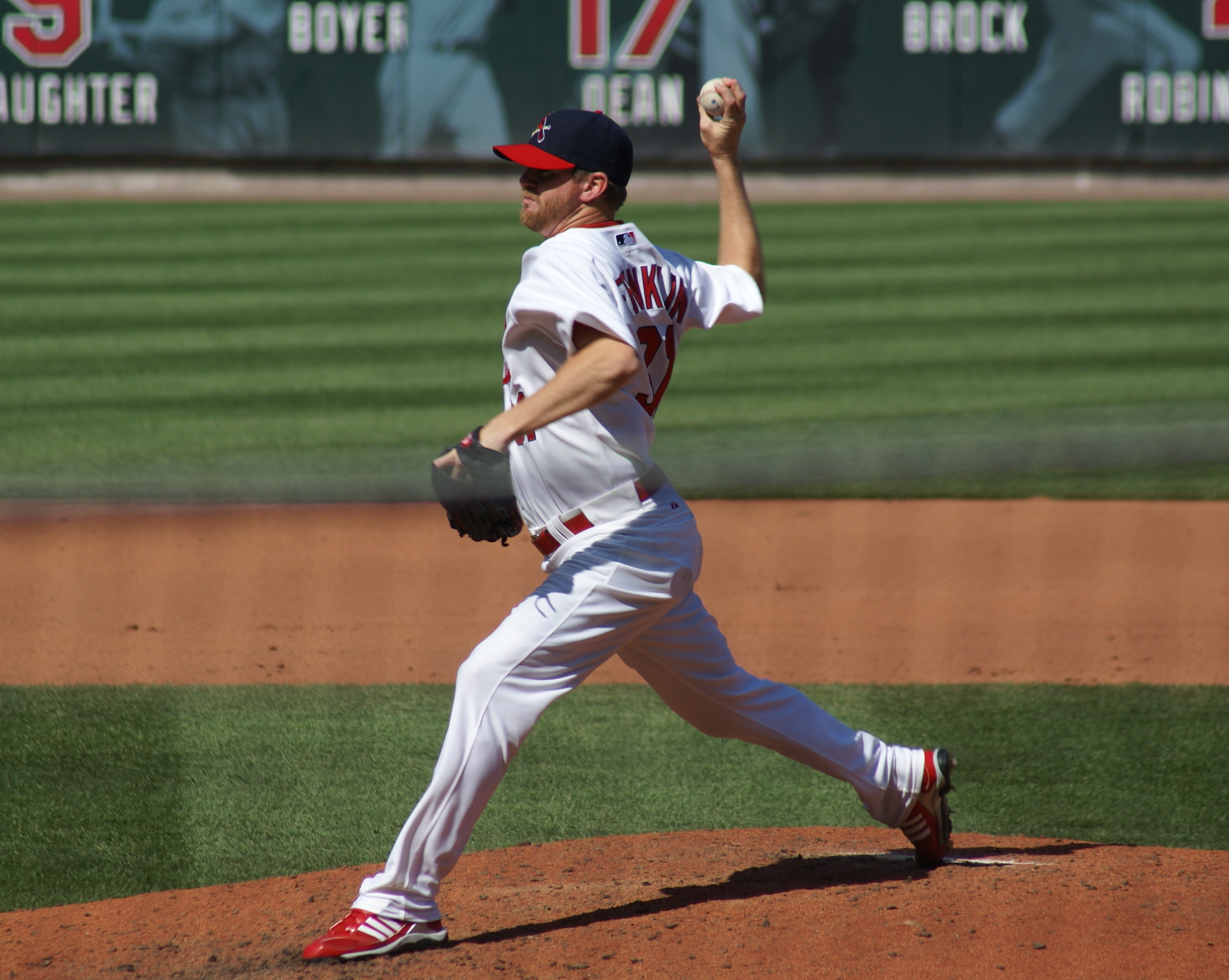
Ryan Franklin pitched back-to-back no-hitters, one combined and one solo, in consecutive starts with the Memphis Chicks in 1997.

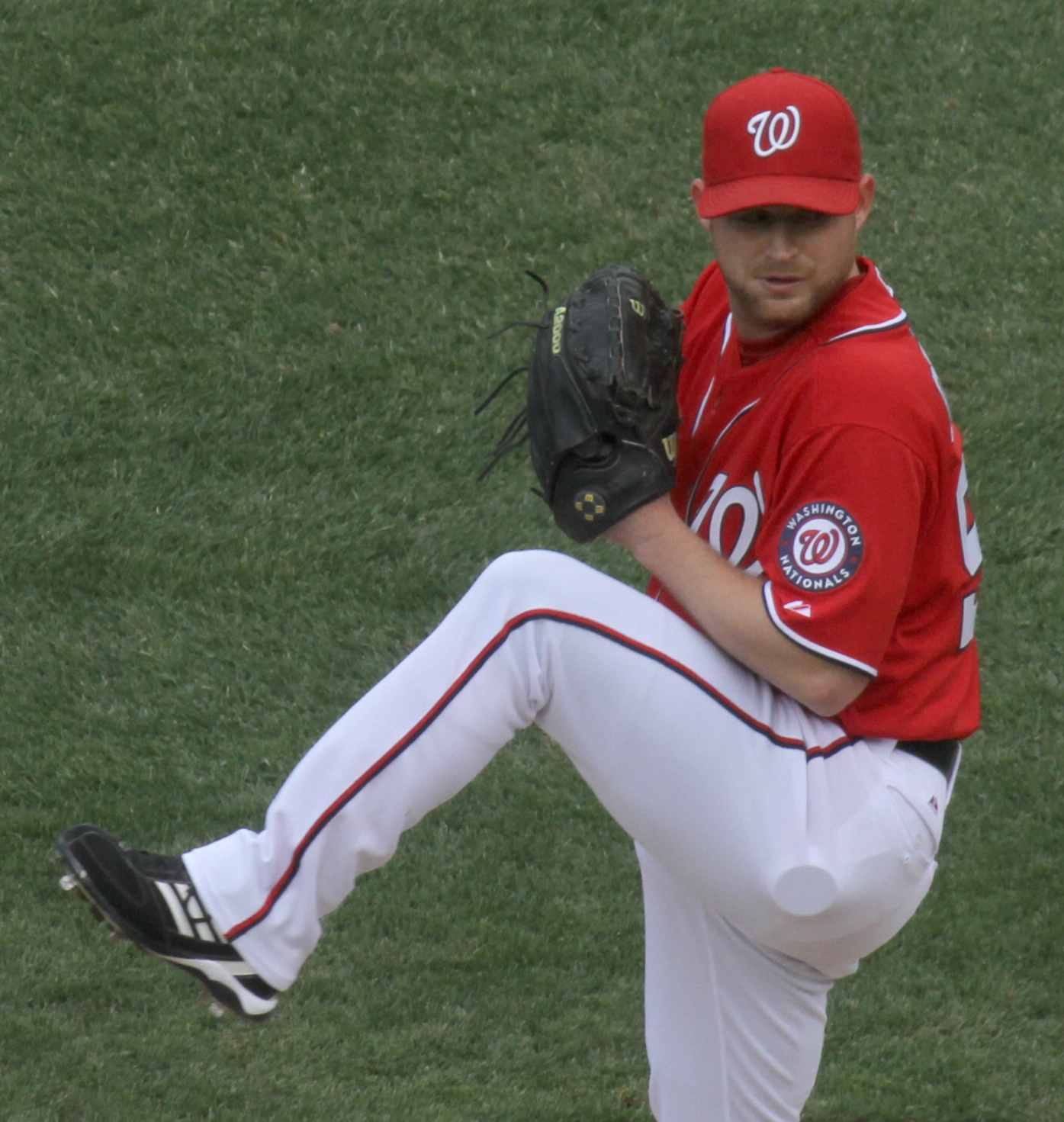
Chad Gaudin tossed a perfect game with the Orlando Rays in a seven-inning doubleheader on July 15, 2003.

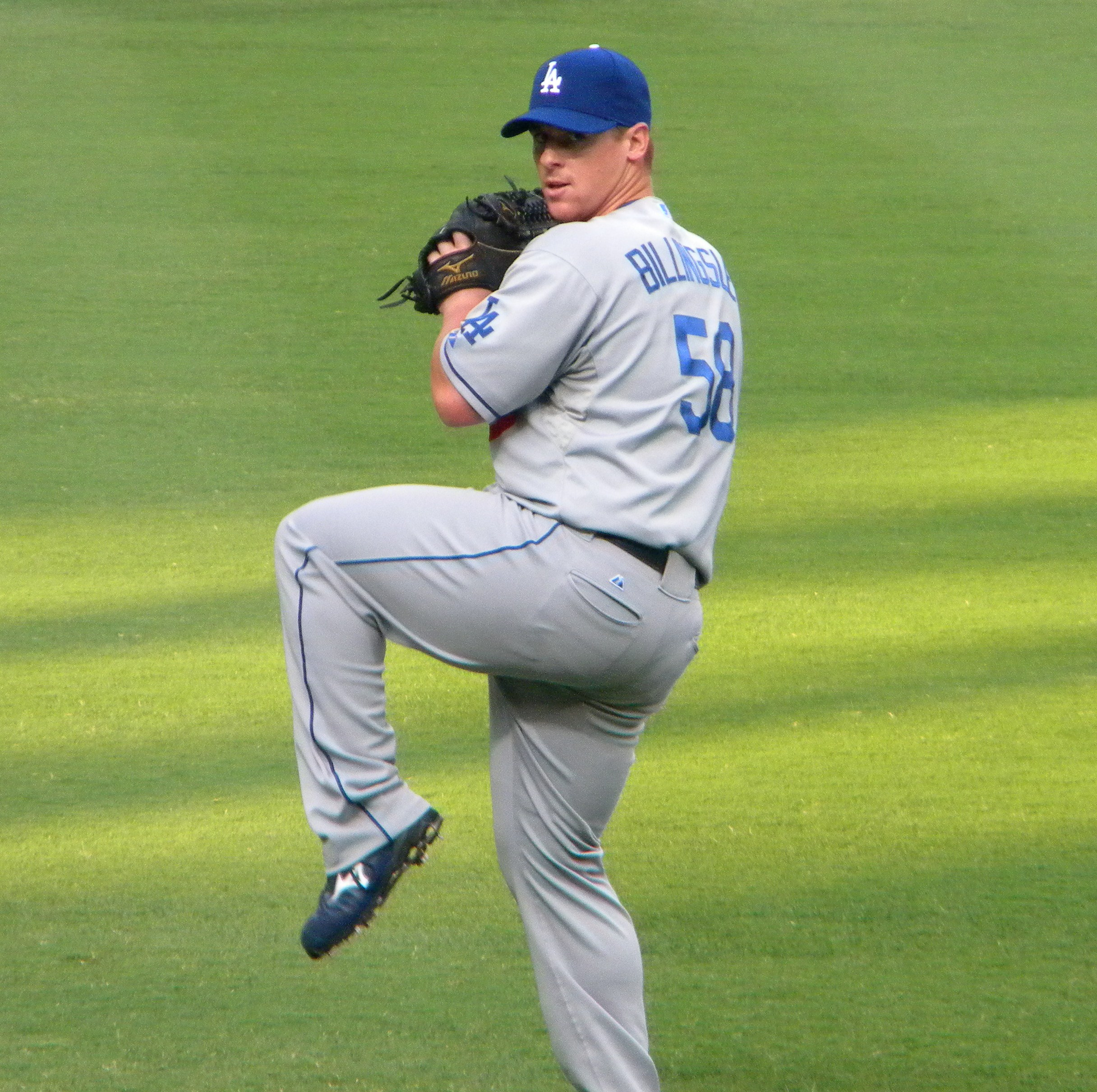
Chad Billingsley worked the first seven innings of a no-hit game for the Jacksonville Suns on September 8, 2005.

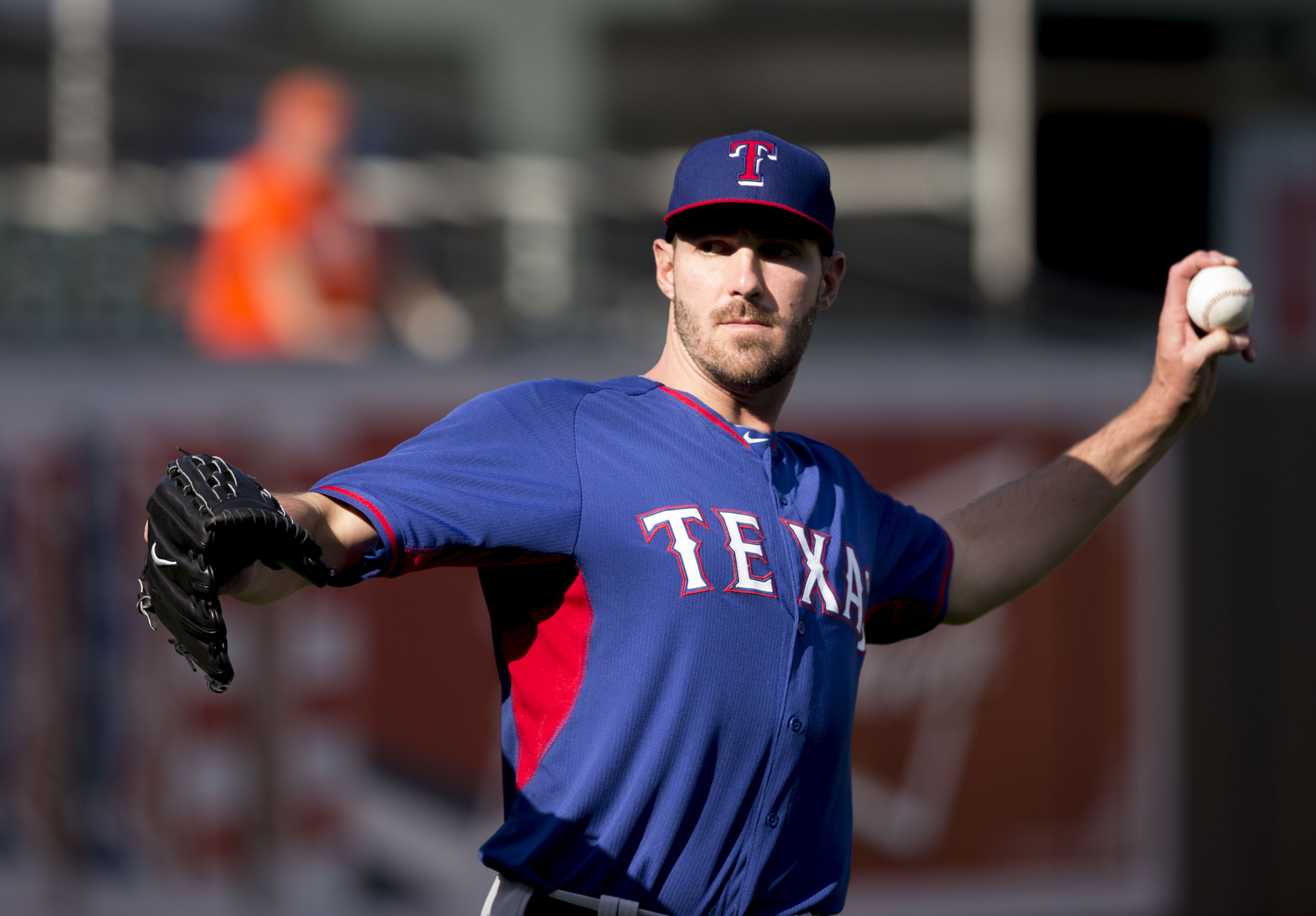
Aaron Poreda threw a rain-shortened, five-inning no-hitter for the Birmingham Barons on May 4, 2009.

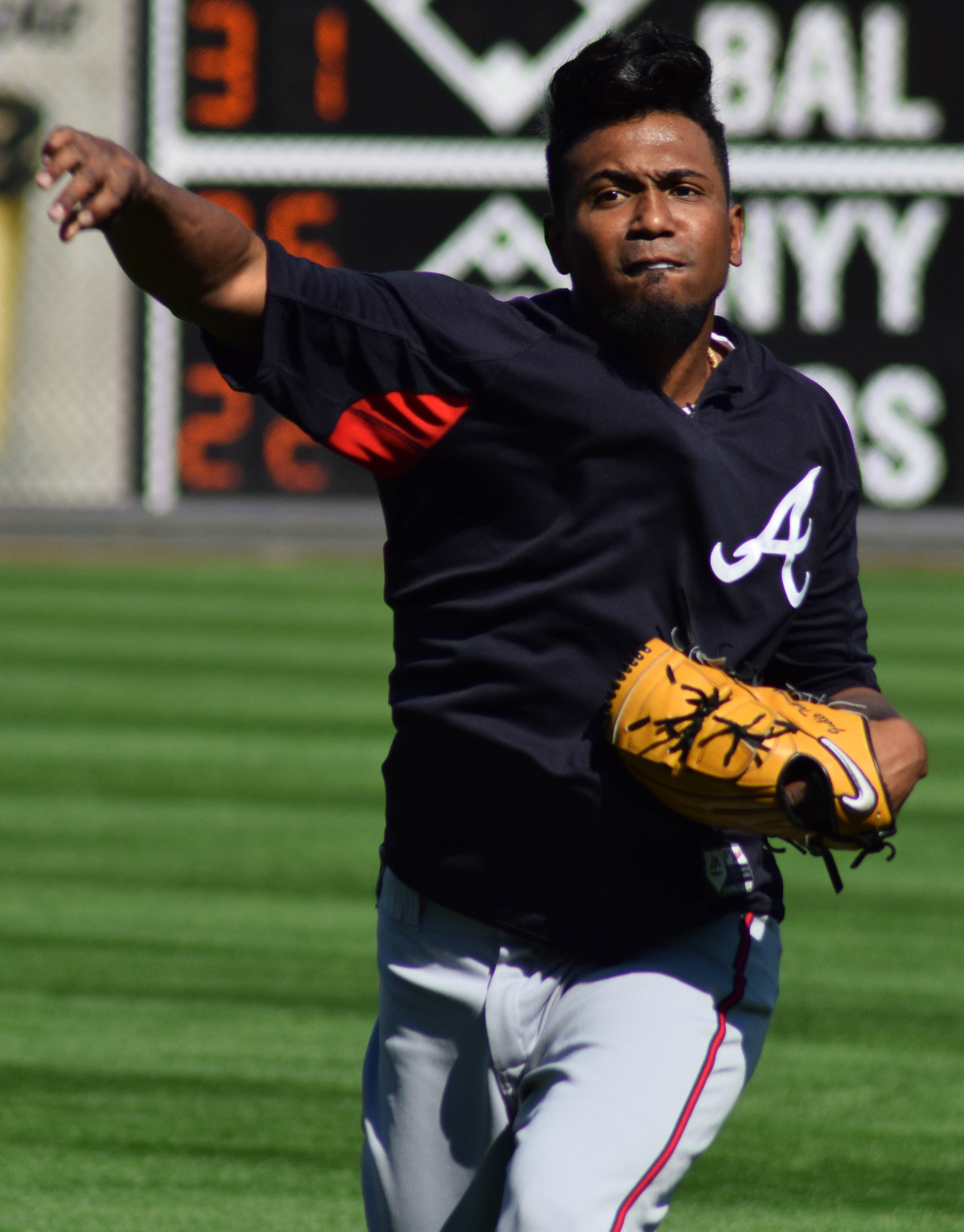
Julio Teherán started a no-hit game with the Mississippi Braves on August 2, 2010.

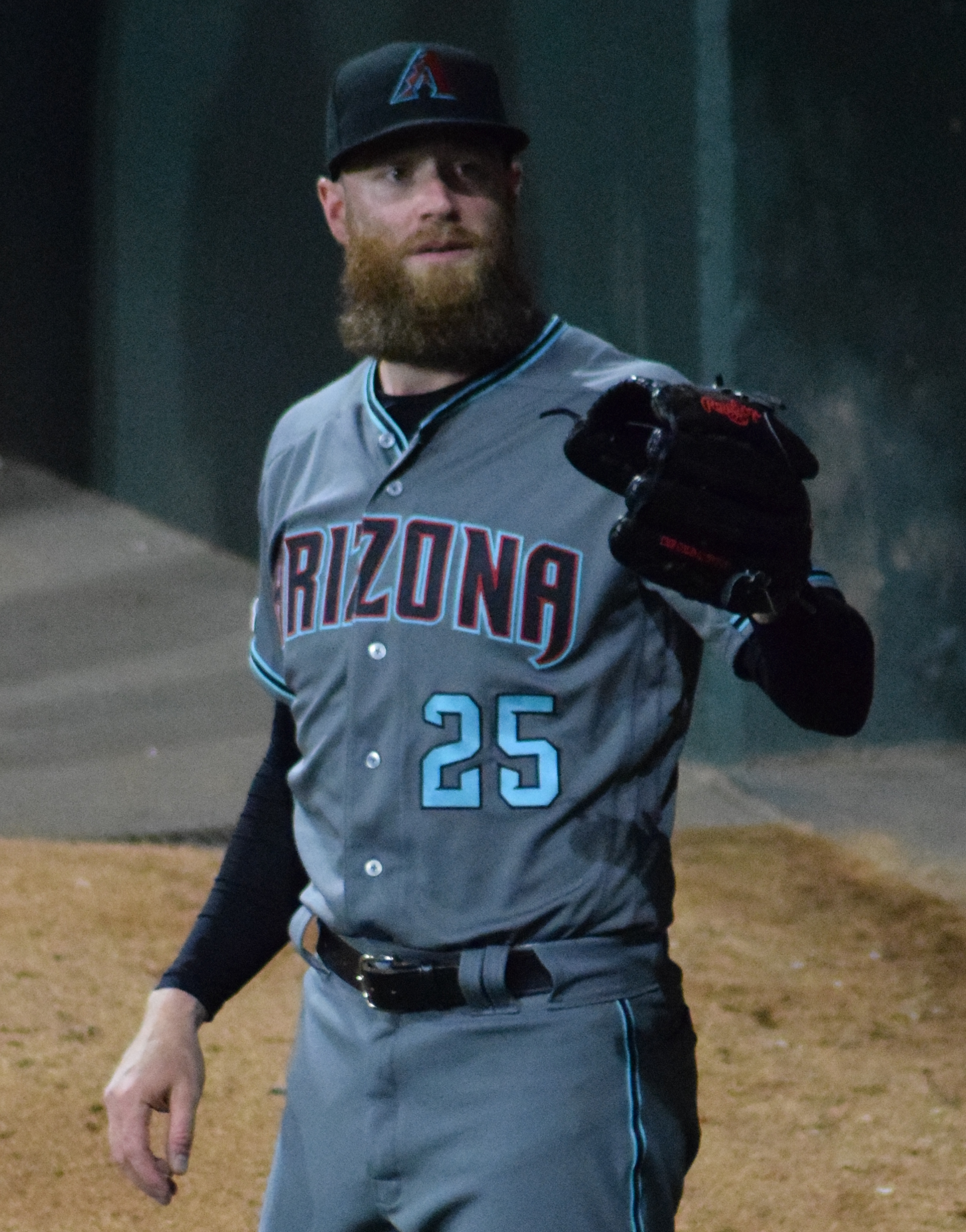
Archie Bradley started a no-hitter for the Mobile BayBears on August 14, 2013.

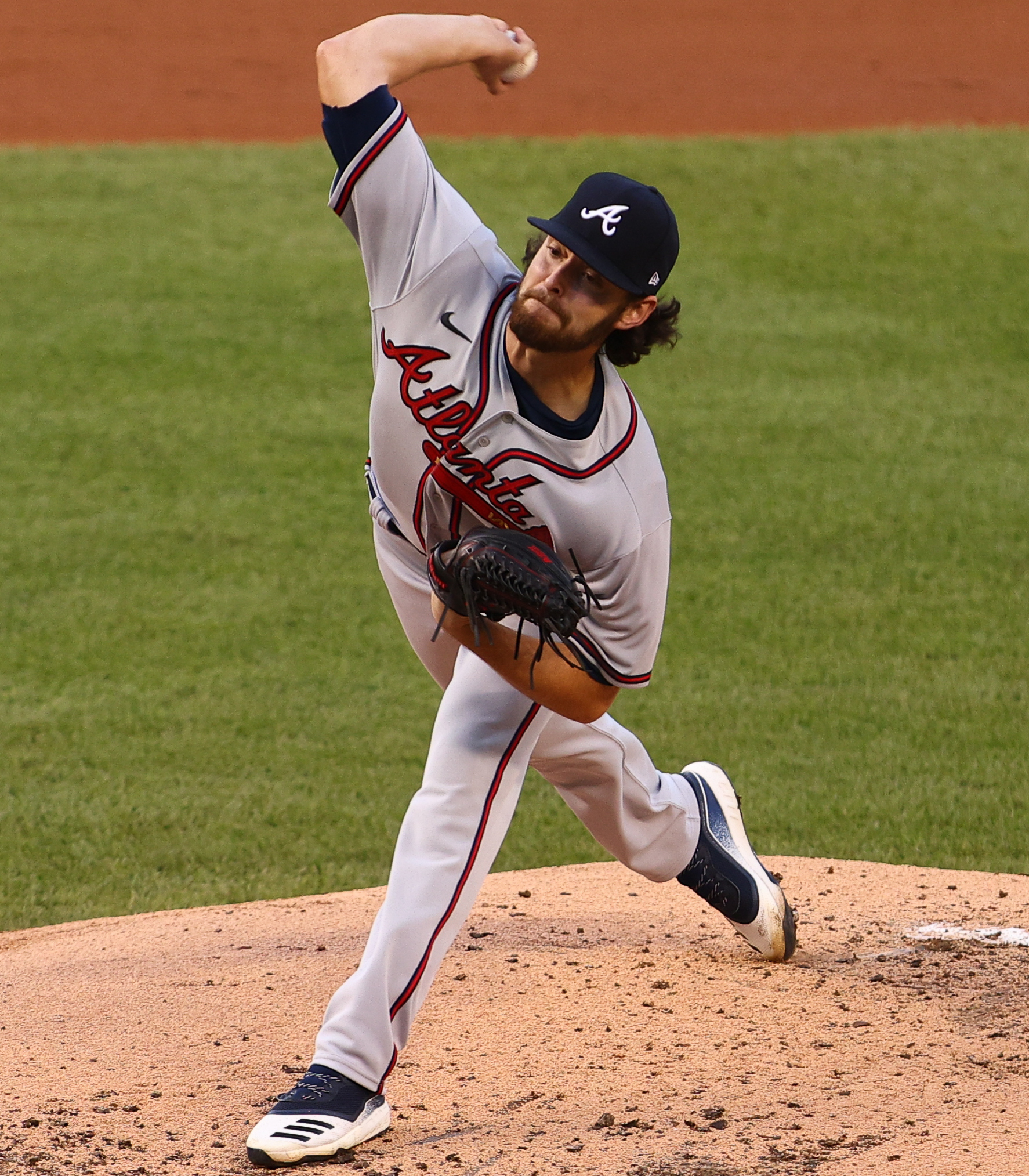
Ian Anderson pitched the first seven innings of a no-hit game with the Mississippi Braves on June 29, 2019.

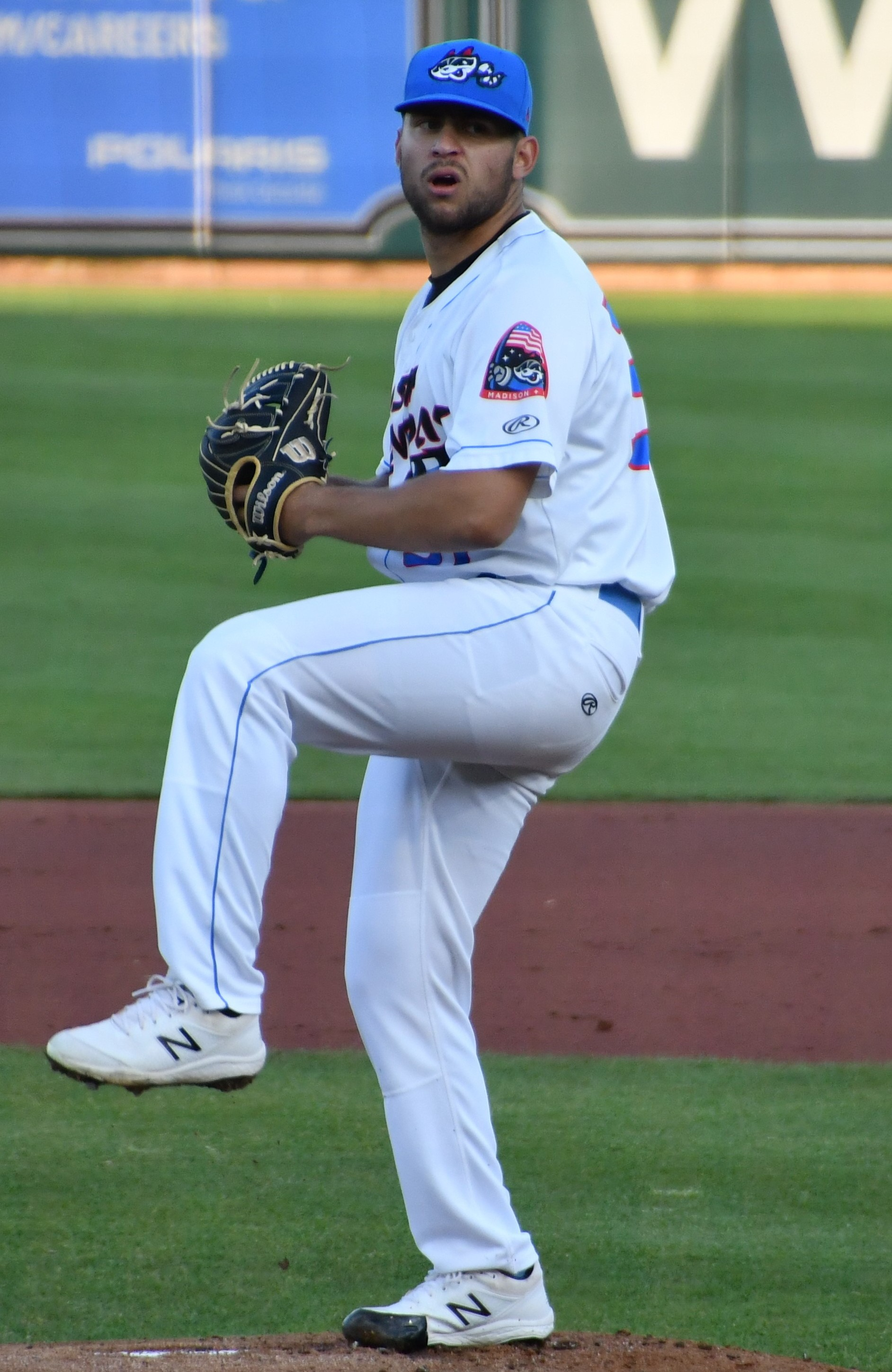
Chase Silseth started a combined no-hit effort with the Rocket City Trash Pandas on September 3, 2022.

No-hitters
No.	Date	Pitcher(s)	Team	Score	Opponent	Location	Ref.
1	May 3, 1964	Doug Gallagher	Knoxville Smokies	3–0 (7)	Asheville Tourists	Bill Meyer Stadium	
2	April 29, 1965	Paul Seitz	Birmingham Barons	2–0 (7)	Chattanooga Lookouts	Engel Stadium	
3	June 30, 1965	Mike Jurewicz	Columbus Confederate Yankees	2–0 (7)	Charlotte Hornets	Clark Griffith Park	
4	August 11, 1965	Bill Whitby	Charlotte Hornets	5–0	Asheville Tourists	Clark Griffith Park	
5	August 13, 1965	Rich Beck	Columbus Confederate Yankees	2–0 (7)	Lynchburg White Sox	Golden Park	
6	July 4, 1966	Steve Jones	Evansville White Sox	1–0 (7)	Columbus Confederate Yankees	Golden Park	
7	April 23, 1967	Robert Sturges	Macon Peaches	0–0 (5) (Note: The game was called due to rain after five innings, resulting in a tie.)	Evansville White Sox	Luther Williams Field	
8	July 6, 1967	George Lauzerique^{†}	Birmingham A's	1–0 (7)	Evansville White Sox	Bosse Field	
9	July 22, 1967	Les Cain	Montgomery Rebels	2–0	Birmingham A's	Paterson Field	
10	July 31, 1967	Mike Olivo	Birmingham A's	2–0 (7)	Evansville White Sox	Rickwood Field	
11	July 7, 1968	Jimmie Brown (1)	Montgomery Rebels	2–0 (7)	Charlotte Hornets	Clark Griffith Park	
12	July 25, 1968	Jimmie Brown (2)	Montgomery Rebels	3–0	Birmingham A's	Paterson Field	
13	May 23, 1969	Paul Edmondson	Columbus White Sox	3–0 (7)	Montgomery Rebels	Paterson Field	
14	July 26, 1969	John Gregory	Montgomery Rebels	6–0 (7)	Savannah Senators	Paterson Field	
15	August 22, 1969	Ron Crook	Asheville Tourists	3–0 (7)	Savannah Senators	Grayson Stadium	
16	August 14, 1970	Charles Swanson^{†}	Montgomery Rebels	3–0	Savannah Indians	Paterson Field	
17	July 9, 1971	Bob Kaiser	Jacksonville Suns	3–0	Montgomery Rebels	Wolfson Park	
18	July 10, 1971	Harold Clem	Asheville Tourists	1–0 (7)	Savannah Braves	Grayson Stadium	
19	August 29, 1971	Pat Darcy	Columbus Astros	2–0	Charlotte Hornets	Clark Griffith Park	
20	September 5, 1971	Daniel Evans	Columbus Astros	3–0	Jacksonville Suns	Wolfson Park	
21	May 12, 1972	Domingo Figueroa	Savannah Braves	1–0	Jacksonville Suns	Grayson Stadium	
22	July 26, 1973	Matt Rosiek	Columbus Astros	9–0	Savannah Braves	Golden Park	
23	August 8, 1973	Dave Lemanczyk	Montgomery Rebels	3–0	Asheville Orioles	Paterson Field	
24	August 26, 1973	Gary Lance	Jacksonville Suns	3–0	Birmingham A's	Wolfson Park	
25	July 5, 1974	Tom Bruno	Jacksonville Suns	3–0 (7)	Columbus Astros	Wolfson Park	
26	July 25, 1974	Mickey Mahler	Savannah Braves	6–0 (7)	Birmingham A's	Grayson Stadium	
27	April 24, 1976	Steve Trella	Montgomery Rebels	1–0 (7)	Jacksonville Suns	Paterson Field	
28	June 4, 1976	Mark Ballinger	Jacksonville Suns	3–0 (7)	Columbus Astros	Golden Park	
29	June 24, 1976	Sheldon Burnside	Montgomery Rebels	8–0 (7)	Charlotte O's	Paterson Field	
30	May 26, 1978	Terry Sheehan	Orlando Twins	3–0	Savannah Braves	Tinker Field	
31	July 12, 1978	Rod Boxberger	Columbus Astros	3–0 (7)	Montgomery Rebels	Golden Park	
32	August 20, 1978	Mike Finlayson	Memphis Chicks	1–0 (7)	Montgomery Rebels	Tim McCarver Stadium	
33	May 16, 1981	Jeff Cornell	Jacksonville Suns	4–0	Nashville Sounds	Herschel Greer Stadium	
34	May 21, 1982	Matt West	Savannah Braves	0–1 (Note: Jacksonville scored one run in the seventh inning. Robert Ferris drew a walk, advanced to second base when another batter walked, and came home following a wild pitch and a subsequent failed pickoff attempt at third by catcher Glen Bockhorn.)	Jacksonville Suns	Wolfson Park	
35	July 9, 1983	Tony Ferreira	Jacksonville Suns	6–0	Knoxville Blue Jays	Wolfson Park	
36	August 25, 1983	Bob Veselic	Columbus Astros	2–0	Nashville Sounds	Golden Park	
37	May 4, 1984	Jim Deshaies	Nashville Sounds	5–1 (7) (Note: Columbus scored one run in the second inning. Mark Strucher drew a walk, advanced to second base when another batter walked, moved up to third when another was hit by a pitch, and came home on a fielder's choice.)	Columbus Astros	Herschel Greer Stadium	
38	August 28, 1984	Dave Shipanoff (7 IP) Mercedes Esquer (1 1/3 IP) Tim Rodgers (1/3) IP	Knoxville Blue Jays	0–1 (9) (Note: Charlotte scored one run in the ninth inning of the scheduled seven-inning doubleheader. Al Pardo drew a walk, advanced to second base on a sacrifice, moved up to third on a wild pitch, and came home when Jeff Schaefer's batted ball was mishandled at second by Hilario Soriano.)	Charlotte O's	Jim Crockett Memorial Park	
39	May 10, 1985	Scot Elam	Knoxville Blue Jays	2–0	Memphis Chicks	Bill Meyer Stadium	
40	May 13, 1985	John Habyan	Charlotte O's	6–0	Columbus Astros	Golden Park	
41	July 2, 1986	Mitch McKelvey	Memphis Chicks	16–0	Columbus Astros	Tim McCarver Stadium	
42	June 4, 1990	Bob Wishnevski	Knoxville Blue Jays	3–0 (7)	Charlotte Knights	Bill Meyer Stadium	
43	June 17, 1990	Kent Bottenfield	Jacksonville Expos	1–0	Orlando Sun Rays	Wolfson Park	
44	July 13, 1990	Frank Castillo	Charlotte Knights	4–0 (7)	Huntsville Stars	Joe W. Davis Stadium	
45	August 9, 1990	Peter Blohm	Knoxville Blue Jays	2–0 (6) (Note: The game was called due to rain after six innings.)	Greenville Braves	Greenville Municipal Stadium	
46	August 30, 1990	Johnny Ard	Orlando Sun Rays	2–0 (7)	Chattanooga Lookouts	Engel Stadium	
47	April 18, 1991	Jose Ventura (6 IP) Chris Howard (2 IP) John Hudek (1 IP)	Birmingham Barons	4–1 (Note: Charlotte scored one run in the fifth inning. Paul Blair drew a walk, advanced to second base when another batter was hit by a pitch, reached third on a fielder's choice, and came home on a sacrifice fly.)	Charlotte Knights	Hoover Metropolitan Stadium	
48	September 8, 1991	Mike Trombley	Orlando Sun Rays	3–0 (7)	Knoxville Blue Jays	Bill Meyer Stadium	
49	May 8, 1992	Mike Zimmerman (7 IP) Dennis Tafoya (1 IP)	Carolina Mudcats	1–0 (8) (Note: Carolina did not score a run until the eighth inning of the scheduled seven-inning doubleheader.)	Chattanooga Lookouts	Five County Stadium	
50	August 3, 1992	Dana Allison (8 IP) Roger Smithberg (1 IP) Todd Revenig (1 IP)	Huntsville Stars	1–0 (10) (Note: Huntsville did not score a run until the tenth inning of the scheduled seven-inning doubleheader.)	Birmingham Barons	Hoover Metropolitan Stadium	
51	August 28, 1992	John Roper	Chattanooga Lookouts	1–0 (7)	Birmingham Barons	Hoover Metropolitan Stadium	
52	June 13, 1993	Tanyon Sturtze	Huntsville Stars	5–0	Chattanooga Lookouts	Engel Stadium	
53	August 8, 1993	Rodney Myers	Memphis Chicks	3–0 (7)	Knoxville Smokies	Tim McCarver Stadium	
54	September 6, 1993	Mike Hostetler	Greenville Braves	2–0	Knoxville Smokies	Greenville Municipal Stadium	
55	August 8, 1995	Luis Andújar	Birmingham Barons	1–0	Memphis Chicks	Tim McCarver Stadium	
56	September 2, 1995	Robbie Beckett (6 1/3 IP)	Memphis Chicks	0–1 (7) (Note: Chattanooga scored one run in the seventh inning. Cleveland Ladell drew a walk, advanced to second base on a wild pitch, and reached third on a sacrifice. The next two batters were intentionally walked and a third drew a walk to bring Ladell home.)	Chattanooga Lookouts	Engel Stadium	
57	June 1, 1996	Travis Buckley	Chattanooga Lookouts	6–0	Huntsville Stars	Joe W. Davis Stadium	
58	April 14, 1997	Ryan Franklin (1) (6 IP) Scott Simmons (1 2/3 IP) David Holdridge (1 1/3 IP)	Memphis Chicks	4–0	Chattanooga Lookouts	Tim McCarver Stadium	
59	April 21, 1997	Ryan Franklin (2)	Memphis Chicks	6–0 (7)	Carolina Mudcats	Five County Stadium	
60	July 22, 1999	David Manning	West Tenn Diamond Jaxx	1–0	Jacksonville Suns	Pringles Park	
61	May 27, 2000	Leo Estrella	Tennessee Smokies	3–0 (6) (Note: The game was called due to rain in the bottom of the sixth inning.)	Orlando Rays	Smokies Park	
62	August 3, 2000	Kevin Mobley	Jacksonville Suns	1–0 (7)	Tennessee Smokies	Wolfson Park	
63	April 5, 2001	Mike Porzio (7 IP) Matt Beaumont (1 IP) Brian Tokarse (1 IP)	Birmingham Barons	5–0	Tennessee Smokies	Hoover Metropolitan Stadium	
64	May 22, 2002	Gerardo Garcia	Orlando Rays	2–0	Tennessee Smokies	Smokies Park	
65	April 9, 2003	Ryan Snare (5 IP) Steve Kent (1 IP) Ryan Baker (1 IP)	Carolina Mudcats	1–0 (7)	Mobile BayBears	Five County Stadium	
66	July 15, 2003	Chad Gaudin^{†}	Orlando Rays	1–0 (7)	Jacksonville Suns	Wolfson Park	
67	April 14, 2004	Trevor Hutchinson (6 IP) Kevin Cave (1 IP)	Carolina Mudcats	5–0 (7)	Huntsville Stars	Joe W. Davis Stadium	
68	July 29, 2005	Nic Ungs	Carolina Mudcats	2–0	West Tenn Diamond Jaxx	Pringles Park	
69	September 8, 2005	Chad Billingsley (7 IP) Jonthan Broxton (2 IP)	Jacksonville Suns	2–0	Birmingham Barons	Wolfson Park	
70	June 21, 2007	Mark Holliman	Tennessee Smokies	3–0 (7)	Huntsville Stars	Smokies Park	
71	September 7, 2007	Corey Thurman (6 IP) David Johnson (2 IP) Luis Pena (1 IP)	Huntsville Stars	5–0	Tennessee Smokies	Joe W. Davis Stadium	
72	June 2, 2008	David Welch	Huntsville Stars	2–0 (7)	Chattanooga Lookouts	AT&T Field	
73	June 25, 2008	Tommy Hanson	Mississippi Braves	6–0	Birmingham Barons	Trustmark Park	
74	May 4, 2009	Aaron Poreda	Birmingham Barons	3–0 (5) (Note: The game was called due to rain in the middle of the fifth inning.)	West Tenn Diamond Jaxx	Regions Park	
75	August 2, 2010	Julio Teherán (5 2/3 IP) Ty'Relle Harris (3 1/3 IP)	Mississippi Braves	2–0	Mobile BayBears	Trustmark Park	
76	June 16, 2011	Matt Moore	Montgomery Biscuits	8–0	Mobile BayBears	Hank Aaron Stadium	
77	June 16, 2012	Daniel Corcino (8 IP) Wilkin De La Rosa (1 IP)	Pensacola Blue Wahoos	6–0	Mobile BayBears	Pensacola Bayfront Stadium	
78	August 2, 2012	Jimmy Nelson (4 IP) Dan Merklinger (2/3 IP) R.J. Seidel (1 1/3 IP) Darren Byrd (2 IP) Brandon Kintzler (1 IP)	Huntsville Stars	3–1 (Note: Chattanooga scored one run in the fifth inning. Matt Wallach drew a walk, advanced to second base on a fielder's choice, moved up to third after two other batters walked, and came home after another batter walked.)	Chattanooga Lookouts	Joe W. Davis Stadium	
79	August 6, 2013	Eric Jokisch	Tennessee Smokies	10–0	Jacksonville Suns	Baseball Grounds of Jacksonville	
80	August 14, 2013	Archie Bradley (5 IP) Matt Gorgen (1 IP) Derek Eitel (1 IP) Willy Paredes (1 IP) Jake Barrett (1 IP)	Mobile BayBears	2–0	Huntsville Stars	Joe W. Davis Stadium	
81	August 24, 2013	Victor Mateo	Montgomery Biscuits	3–0	Jacksonville Suns	Montgomery Riverwalk Stadium	
82	August 28, 2014	Andrés Santiago	Chattanooga Lookouts	1–0	Tennessee Smokies	AT&T Field	
83	June 9, 2015	Frankie Montas	Birmingham Barons	2–0 (7)	Tennessee Smokies	Smokies Stadium	
84	May 20, 2016	Jackson Stephens (5 IP) Matt Magill (1 IP) Carlos Gonzalez (1 IP)	Pensacola Blue Wahoos	6–0 (7)	Jacksonville Suns	Baseball Grounds of Jacksonville	
85	July 11, 2016	Steve Ascher (3 IP) Jared Mortensen (2 IP) Jordan Harrison (2/3 IP) Kyle Winkler (1 1/3 IP)	Montgomery Biscuits	2–1 (Note: Jackson scored one run in the fifth inning. Brock Hebert drew a walk, advanced to second base on a wild pitch, advanced to third on a fielder's choice, and came home on a wild pitch.)	Jackson Generals	The Ballpark at Jackson	
86	April 22, 2017	Tyler Mahle^{†}	Pensacola Blue Wahoos	1–0	Mobile BayBears	Hank Aaron Stadium	
87	August 14, 2017	Hiram Burgos (2 IP) Forrest Snow (3 IP) Nick Ramirez (1 IP) Jorge López (1 IP)	Biloxi Shuckers	1–0 (7)	Tennessee Smokies	MGM Park	
88	April 28, 2018	Griffin Canning (1) (3 IP) Matt Custred (3 IP) Ryan Clark (1) (1 IP)	Mobile BayBears	1–0	Montgomery Biscuits	Montgomery Riverwalk Stadium	
89	May 14, 2018	Griffin Canning (2) (4 1/3 IP) Greg Mahle (1 2/3 IP) Adrian Almeida (1 2/3 IP) Ryan Clark (2) (1 1/3 IP)	Mobile BayBears	9–0	Birmingham Barons	Hank Aaron Stadium	
90	June 14, 2018	Justin Donatella (3 IP) Daniel Gibson (2 IP) Kirby Bellow (1 IP) Kevin Ginkel (2 IP) Brad Goldberg (1 IP)	Jackson Generals	6–0	Jacksonville Jumbo Shrimp	Baseball Grounds of Jacksonville	
91	June 28, 2019	Ian Anderson (7 IP) Jeremy Walker (2 IP)	Mississippi Braves	2–0	Jackson Generals	Trustmark Park	
92	May 15, 2021	Ethan Small (5 IP) Zach Vennaro (1 IP) Nathan Kirby (2 IP) Matt Hardy (1 IP)	Biloxi Shuckers	1–0	Mississippi Braves	MGM Park	
93	July 10, 2021	Bryce Elder (7 IP) Daysbel Hernández (2 IP)	Mississippi Braves	6–0	Pensacola Blue Wahoos	Trustmark Park	
94	May 11, 2022	Peyton Remy (6 IP) Danis Correa (2 IP) Eury Ramos (1 IP)	Tennessee Smokies	5–0	Montgomery Biscuits	Smokies Stadium	
95	June 28, 2022	Anderson Espinoza (5 IP) Samuel Reyes (2 IP) Bryan King (1 IP) Nicholas Padilla (1 IP)	Tennessee Smokies	2–0	Rocket City Trash Pandas	Smokies Stadium	
96	September 3, 2022	Chase Silseth (7 IP) Luke Murphy (1 IP) Eric Torres (1) (1 IP)	Rocket City Trash Pandas	8–0	Biloxi Shuckers	Toyota Field	
97	April 8, 2023	Coleman Crow (6 IP) Ben Joyce (2/3 IP) Eric Torres (2) (1/3 IP)	Rocket City Trash Pandas	5–7 (7) (Note: Chattanooga scored seven runs in the seventh inning. Five batters walked and four were hit by pitches. Rocket City committed one fielding error and a wild pitch.)	Chattanooga Lookouts	Toyota Field	
98	April 16, 2023	Sean Hunley (4 IP) Jeff Belge (1 IP) Enmanuel Mejia (1 IP) Graham Spraker (1 IP)	Montgomery Biscuits	10–0 (7)	Tennessee Smokies	Montgomery Riverwalk Stadium	
99	May 17, 2024	Ian Mejia	Mississippi Braves	2–0 (7)	Biloxi Shuckers	Trustmark Park	
100	July 20, 2024	Jairo Iriarte (5 IP) Garrett Schoenle (2 IP)	Birmingham Barons	1–0 (7)	Chattanooga Lookouts	Regions Field	
101	June 14, 2025	Jaxon Wiggins (5 2/3 IP) A.J. Puckett (1/3 IP) Sam Armstrong (1 IP)	Knoxville Smokies	5–1 (7) (Note: Columbus scored one run in the sixth inning. Cody Milligan drew a walk, advanced to second base when another batter walked, moved up to third on a wild pitch, and came home on a sacrifice.)	Columbus Clingstones	Synovus Park	

== No-hitters by team ==
Active Southern League teams appear in bold.

Team	No-hitters	Perfect games
**Knoxville Smokies** (Knoxville Blue Jays/Tennessee Smokies)	11	0
**Birmingham Barons** (Birmingham A's)	9	1
Jacksonville Suns (Jacksonville Expos)	9	0
Montgomery Rebels	8	1
Columbus Astros (Columbus White Sox)	6	0
Memphis Chicks	6	0
Huntsville Stars	5	0
Mississippi Braves	5	0
Orlando Rays (Orlando Twins/Sun Rays)	5	1
Carolina Mudcats	4	0
**Montgomery Biscuits**	4	0
**Chattanooga Lookouts**	3	0
Mobile BayBears	3	0
**Pensacola Blue Wahoos**	3	1
Savannah Braves	3	0
Charlotte Knights (Charlotte O's)	2	0
Columbus Confederate Yankees	2	0
Jackson Generals (West Tenn Diamond Jaxx)	2	0
Asheville Tourists	2	0
**Biloxi Shuckers**	2	0
**Rocket City Trash Pandas**	2	0
Charlotte Hornets	1	0
Evansville White Sox	1	0
Greenville Braves	1	0
Macon Peaches	1	0
Nashville Sounds	1	0
**Totals**	101	4
