= 1998 Seattle Mariners season =

1998 Seattle Mariners
- League: American League
- Division: West
- Ballpark: Kingdome
- City: Seattle, Washington
- Record: 76–85 (.472)
- Divisional place: 3rd
- Owners: Hiroshi Yamauchi (represented by John Ellis)
- General manager: Woody Woodward
- Manager: Lou Piniella
- Television: KIRO-TV 7 KSTW; Fox Sports Northwest
- Radio: KIRO 710 AM (Dave Niehaus, Rick Rizzs, Ron Fairly, Dave Valle, Dave Henderson)

The Seattle Mariners 1998 season was their 22nd season, and was the final year in which Kingdome was the home venue for the entire season. Their record was 76–85 (.472) and they finished in third place in the four-team American League West, 11½ games behind the champion Texas Rangers.

The Mariners were the defending division champions, but exceeded the .500 mark only once during the season; at 19–18 after a win at Detroit on May 12. On July 18 at the Kingdome, Seattle (crimson, silver, and black) and the Kansas City Royals (yellow gold and blue) played a game in futuristic uniforms for "Turn Ahead the Clock" night. Shortstop Alex Rodriguez hit a three-run homer in the seventh inning and the Mariners won by three.

The Mariners traded future Hall of Famer pitcher Randy Johnson to the Houston Astros on July 31, receiving Freddy García, Carlos Guillén, and John Halama in return.

Ken Griffey Jr. hit 56 home runs to tie his franchise record set the year before. Rodriguez hit 42 home runs and stole 46 bases to become the third member of the 40–40 club, joining Jose Canseco (1988) and Barry Bonds (1996).

== Offseason ==
- November 13, 1997: Jalal Leach signed with the Mariners.
- November 18: Andy Sheets and Bob Wolcott selected in the 1997 expansion draft by the Tampa Bay Devil Rays and Arizona Diamondbacks, respectively.
- December 3: Ken Huckaby signed with the Mariners.
- December 16,: Pat Listach signed as a free agent with the Mariners.
- December 27: Rico Rossy signed as a free agent with the Mariners.
- January 8, 1998: Glenallen Hill signed as a free agent with the Mariners.
- January 29: Leach was traded by the Mariners with minor leaguer Scott Smith to the San Francisco Giants for David McCarty.

== Regular season ==
=== Season standings ===
AL West
Team	W	L	Pct.	GB	Home	Road
Texas Rangers	88	74	.543	—	48‍–‍33	40‍–‍41
Anaheim Angels	85	77	.525	3	42‍–‍39	43‍–‍38
Seattle Mariners	76	85	.472	11½	42‍–‍39	34‍–‍46
Oakland Athletics	74	88	.457	14	39‍–‍42	35‍–‍46

=== Record vs. opponents ===
1998 American League record Source: MLB Standings Grid – 1998
Team	ANA	BAL	BOS	CWS	CLE	DET	KC	MIN	NYY	OAK	SEA	TB	TEX	TOR	NL
Anaheim	—	5–6	6–5	5–6	4–7	8–3	6–5	6–5	6–5	5–7	9–3	6–5	5–7	4–7	10–6
Baltimore	6–5	—	6–6	2–9	5–6	10–1	5–6	7–3	3–9	8–3	6–5	5–7	6–5	5–7	5–11
Boston	5–6	6–6	—	5–6	8–3	5–5	8–3	5–6	5–7	9–2	7–4	9–3	6–5	5–7	9–7
Chicago	6–5	9–2	6–5	—	6–6	6–6	8–4	6–6	4–7	4–7	4–7	5–6	5–6	4–6–1	7–9
Cleveland	7–4	6–5	3–8	6–6	—	9–3	8–4	6–6	4–7	3–8	9–2	7–3	4–7	7–4	10–6
Detroit	3–8	1–10	5–5	6–6	3–9	—	6–6	8–4	3–8	7–4	3–8	5–6	3–8	5–6	7–9
Kansas City	5–6	6–5	3–8	4–8	4–8	6–6	—	7–5	0–10	7–4	4–6	8–3	3–8	6–5	9–7
Minnesota	5–6	3–7	6–5	6–6	6–6	4–8	5–7	—	4–7	4–7	2–9	7–4	7–4	4–7	7–9
New York	5–6	9–3	7–5	7–4	7–4	8–3	10–0	7–4	—	8–3	8–3	11–1	8–3	6–6	13–3
Oakland	7–5	3–8	2–9	7–4	8–3	4–7	4–7	7–4	3–8	—	5–7	5–6	6–6	5–6	8–8
Seattle	3–9	5–6	4–7	7–4	2–9	8–3	6–4	9–2	3–8	7–5	—	6–5	5–7	4–7	7–9
Tampa Bay	5–6	7–5	3–9	6–5	3–7	6–5	3–8	4–7	1–11	6–5	5–6	—	4–7	5–7	5–11
Texas	7–5	5–6	5–6	6–5	7–4	8–3	8–3	4–7	3–8	6–6	7–5	7–4	—	7–4	8–8
Toronto	7–4	7–5	7–5	6–4–1	4–7	6–5	5–6	7–4	6–6	6–5	7–4	7–5	4–7	—	9–7

=== Opening Day starters ===
- Jay Buhner
- Joey Cora
- Russ Davis
- Ken Griffey Jr.
- Glenallen Hill
- Randy Johnson
- Edgar Martínez
- Alex Rodriguez
- David Segui
- Dan Wilson

=== Notable transactions ===
- June 13, 1998: Catcher Ken Huckaby was released by the Mariners.
- July 6: Outfielder Glenallen Hill was selected off waivers by the Chicago Cubs from the Mariners.
- July 31: Randy Johnson was traded by the Mariners to the Houston Astros for pitcher Freddy García, infielder Carlos Guillén, and a player to be named later; Houston sent pitcher John Halama to the Mariners on October 1 to complete the trade.
- August 31: Infielder David Bell was traded by the Cleveland Indians to the Mariners for Joey Cora.

=== Roster ===
1998 Seattle Mariners
Roster
Pitchers: 48 Paul Abbott; 31 Bobby Ayala; 44 Jim Bullinger; 27 Ken Cloude; 13 Jeff Fassero; 48 Tony Fossas; 54 Steve Gajkowski; 59 David Holdridge; 51 Randy Johnson; 41 Felipe Lira; 62 Andrew Lorraine; 39 Greg McCarthy; 50 Jamie Moyer; 30 José Paniagua; 52 Heathcliff Slocumb; 34 Paul Spoljaric; 41 Mac Suzuki; 26 Bill Swift; 40 Mike Timlin; 46 Bob Wells	Catchers: 62 Raúl Chávez; 17 John Marzano; 9 Joe Oliver; 2 Rick Wilkins; 6 Dan Wilson; Infielders: 2 David Bell; 28 Joey Cora; 18 Russ Davis; 4 Giomar Guevara; 5 Carlos Guillén; 9 Jeff Huson; 11 Edgar Martínez; 3 Alex Rodriguez; 44 Rico Rossy; 21 David Segui	Outfielders: 8 Rich Amaral; 19 Jay Buhner; 48 Rickey Cradle; 20 Rob Ducey; 16 Charles Gipson; 24 Ken Griffey Jr.; 1 Glenallen Hill; 38 Raúl Ibañez; 23 David McCarty; 12 Shane Monahan; 30 Robert Pérez; 33 Ryan Radmanovich	Manager: 14 Lou Piniella; Coaches: 29 Jesse Barfield; 54 Nardi Contreras; 7 John McLaren; 49 Sam Mejías; 15 Matt Sinatro; 2 Steve Smith

=== Major league debuts ===
- Batters:
  - Rickey Cradle (Jul 1)
  - Charles Gipson (Mar 31)
  - Carlos Guillén (Sep 6)
  - Shane Monahan (Jul 9)
  - Ryan Radmanovich (Apr 13)
- Pitchers:
  - Steve Gajkowski (May 25)
  - David Holdridge (Aug 8)

== Game log ==
Game Log
March

#	Date	Opponent	Score	Win	Loss	Save	Attendance	Record
1	March 31	Cleveland Indians	9-10	Mesa (1-0)	Fossas (0-1)	Jackson (1)	57,822	0-1

April

#	Date	Opponent	Score	Win	Loss	Save	Attendance	Record
2	April 1	Cleveland Indians	7-9	Wright (1-0)	Moyer (0-1)	Jackson (2)	24,523	0-2
3	April 3	Boston Red Sox	11-6	Cloude (1-0)	Lowe (0-1)		27,555	1-2
4	April 4	Boston Red Sox	12-6	Swift (1-0)	Rose (0-1)		43,035	2-2
5	April 5	Boston Red Sox	5-10	Saberhagen (1-0)	Johnson (0-1)		35,143	2-3
6	April 6	New York Yankees	8-0	Moyer (1-1)	Pettitte (0-2)		27,445	3-3
7	April 7	New York Yankees	7-13	Wells (1-1)	Bullinger (0-1)		28,424	3-4
8	April 8	New York Yankees	3-4	Lloyd (1-0)	Ayala (0-1)	Stanton (1)	33,922	3-5
9	April 10	@ Boston Red Sox	7-9	Garces (1-0)	Timlin (0-1)		32,805	3-6
10	April 11	@ Boston Red Sox	0-5	Martinez (2-0)	Moyer (1-2)		32,403	3-7
11	April 12	@ Boston Red Sox	7-8	Wasdin (2-0)	Slocumb (0-1)		23,270	3-8
12	April 13	@ Cleveland Indians	5-6	Burba (2-1)	Cloude (1-1)	Jackson (6)	42,793	3-9
13	April 14	@ Cleveland Indians	3-8	Assenmacher (1-0)	Slocumb (0-2)		40,490	3-10
14	April 15	@ Cleveland Indians	5-3	Spoljaric (1-0)	Assenmacher (1-1)	Ayala (1)	40,527	4-10
15	April 16	@ Minnesota Twins	3-2	Timlin (1-0)	Aguliera (0-2)	Ayala (2)	11,351	5-10
16	April 17	@ Minnesota Twins	11-6	Fassero (1-0)	Milton (2-1)		18,169	6-10
17	April 18	@ Minnesota Twins	5-3	Cloude (2-1)	Tewksbury (2-2)	Ayala (3)	23,943	7-10
18	April 19	@ Minnesota Twins	7-4	Swift (2-0)	Hawkins (0-2)	Timlin (1)	15,124	8-10
19	April 20	Kansas City Royals	8-7	Lira (1-0)	Rios (0-1)	Ayala (4)	38,345	9-10
20	April 21	Kansas City Royals	3-5	Bevil (3-0)	Fossas (0-2)	Montgomery (4)	21,547	9-11
21	April 22	Kansas City Royals	11-5	Fassero (2-0)	Pichardo (0-2)		22,698	10-11
22	April 24	Minnesota Twins	4-2	Cloude (3-1)	Tewksbury (2-3)	Ayala (5)	28,157	11-11
23	April 25	Minnesota Twins	2-8	Aguliera (1-2)	Timlin (1-2)		51,880	11-12
24	April 26	Minnesota Twins	0-2	Radke (3-1)	Moyer (1-3)	Aguilera (4)	31,732	11-13
25	April 28	@ Kansas City Royals	5-1	Johnson (1-1)	Service (1-1)		11,630	12-13
26	April 29	@ New York Yankees	5-8	Cone (3-1)	Fassero (2-1)	Rivera (3)	27,949	12-14
27	April 30	@ New York Yankees	8-9	Rivera (1-0)	Ayala (0-2)		28,517	12-15

May

#	Date	Opponent	Score	Win	Loss	Save	Attendance	Record
28	May 1	Detroit Tigers	3-17	Worrell (2-3)	Swift (2-1)		28,827	12-16
29	May 2	Detroit Tigers	4-0	Moyer (2-3)	Thompson (1-4)		48,630	13-16
30	May 3	Detroit Tigers	10-6	Johnson (2-1)	Castillo (0-1)		44,488	14-16
31	May 5	Chicago White Sox	8-1	Fassero (3-1)	Eyre (1-4)		22,760	15-16
32	May 6	Chicago White Sox	10-9	Slocumb (1-2)	Castillo (0-2)	Ayala (6)	21,243	16-16
33	May 7	Toronto Blue Jays	0-6	Clemens (4-3)	Moyer (2-4)		24,129	16-17
34	May 8	Toronto Blue Jays	8-3	Johnson (3-1)	Williams (3-2)		29,920	17-17
35	May 9	Toronto Blue Jays	1-4	Hentgen (4-3)	Swift (2-2)	Myers (9)	49,851	17-18
36	May 10	Toronto Blue Jays	3-1	Fassero (4-1)	Guzman (1-5)	Ayala (7)	39,249	18-18
37	May 12	@ Detroit Tigers	4-2	Spoljaric (2-0)	Thompson (2-5)	Ayala (8)	11,659	19-18
38	May 13	@ Detroit Tigers	5-8	Moehler (3-3)	Cloude (3-2)	Jones (5)	10,766	19-19
39	May 14	@ Chicago White Sox	3-5	Fordham (1-0)	Johnson (3-2)	Simas (2)	15,007	19-20
40	May 15	@ Chicago White Sox	3-6	Navarro (4-3)	Swift (2-3)	Foulke (1)	16,127	19-21
41	May 16	@ Toronto Blue Jays	8-1	Fassero (5-1)	Guzman (1-6)		31,121	20-21
42	May 17	@ Toronto Blue Jays	3-4	Plesac (2-2)	Slocumb (1-3)		28,111	20-22
43	May 18	@ Toronto Blue Jays	9-4	Spoljaric (3-0)	Clemens (4-5)		28,125	21-22
44	May 19	@ Texas Rangers	4-10	Helling (7-1)	Johnson (3-3)	Hernandez (1)	37,258	21-23
45	May 20	@ Texas Rangers	7-8	Crabtree (1-0)	Timlin (1-3)	Wetteland (13)	29,454	21-24
46	May 21	@ Texas Rangers	8-9	Bailes (1-0)	Ayala (0-3)		34,613	21-25
47	May 22	Tampa Bay Devil Rays	2-5	Johnson (2-1)	Moyer (2-5)	Hernandez (8)	29,522	21-26
48	May 23	Tampa Bay Devil Rays	3-6	Yan (4-0)	Ayala (0-4)	Hernandez (9)	35,819	21-27
49	May 24	Tampa Bay Devil Rays	3-1	Johnson (4-3)	Springer (1-8)		46,867	22-27
50	May 25	Baltimore Orioles	12-4	Swift (3-3)	Rodriguez (0-2)		28,375	23-27
51	May 26	Baltimore Orioles	3-8	Erickson (5-5)	Fassero (5-2)		31,164	23-28
52	May 28	@ Tampa Bay Devil Rays	5-2	Moyer (3-5)	Johnson (2-2)		27,017	24-28
53	May 29	@ Tampa Bay Devil Rays	6-2	Johnson (5-3)	Saunders (1-5)		32,142	25-28
54	May 30	@ Tampa Bay Devil Rays	2-5	Springer (2-8)	Cloude (3-3)	Hernandez (10)	40,212	25-29
55	May 31	@ Tampa Bay Devil Rays	11-6	Swift (4-3)	White (0-1)		35,184	26-29

June

#	Date	Opponent	Score	Win	Loss	Save	Attendance	Record
56	June 1	@ Baltimore Orioles	9-10	Mills (1-2)	Fossas (0-3)	Benitez (8)	42,622	26-30
57	June 2	@ Baltimore Orioles	8-9	Charlton (1-1)	Ayala (0-5)		46,724	26-31
58	June 3	Anaheim Angels	1-8	Finley (6-2)	Johnson (5-4)		24,944	26-32
59	June 4	Anaheim Angels	2-6	Hill (8-4)	Cloude (3-4)	Hasegawa (1)	23,709	26-33
60	June 5	Los Angeles Dodgers	4-0	Swift (5-3)	Valdez (4-7)		39,053	27-33
61	June 6	Los Angeles Dodgers	6-10	Bruske (3-0)	Wells (0-1)	Osuna (2)	49,559	27-34
62	June 7	Los Angeles Dodgers	4-7	Dreifort (4-5)	Moyer (3-6)	Osuna (3)	41,514	27-35
63	June 8	@ San Francisco Giants	3-4	Darwin (6-3)	Johnson (5-5)	Rodriguez (1)	34,166	27-36
64	June 9	@ San Francisco Giants	6-7	Johnstone (2-2)	Cloude (3-5)	Nen (19)	24,137	27-37
65	June 10	@ San Francisco Giants	4-1	Swift (6-3)	Hershiser (6-4)	Slocumb (1)	23,590	28-37
66	June 11	@ Oakland Athletics	2-5	Oquist (4-3)	Fassero (5-3)	Taylor (11)	7,838	28-38
67	June 12	@ Oakland Athletics	5-0	Moyer (4-6)	Candiotti (4-8)		11,533	29-38
68	June 13	@ Oakland Athletics	3-7	Stein (3-3)	Johnson (5-6)	Fetters (3)	21,444	29-39
69	June 14	@ Oakland Athletics	3-4	Taylor (2-5)	Slocumb (1-4)		21,503	29-40
70	June 16	@ Anaheim Angels	2-3	Dickson (7-4)	Swift (6-4)	Percival (21)	23,123	29-41
71	June 17	@ Anaheim Angels	2-4	Olivares (5-2)	Fassero (5-4)	Percival (22)	24,800	29-42
72	June 18	@ Anaheim Angels	5-11	Washburn (3-0)	Spoljaric (3-1)	DeLucia (1)	30,268	29-43
73	June 19	Oakland Athletics	9-1	Johnson (6-6)	Stein (3-4)		33,212	30-43
74	June 20	Oakland Athletics	2-6	Haynes (5-3)	Cloude (3-6)		44,597	30-44
75	June 21	Oakland Athletics	10-5	Swift (7-4)	Oquist (4-4)		37,665	31-44
76	June 22	San Diego Padres	3-5	Miceli (7-2)	Fassero (5-5)	Hoffman (23)	41,571	31-45
77	June 23	San Diego Padres	5-3	Moyer (5-6)	Hamilton (5-8)	Slocumb (2)	30,961	32-45
78	June 24	@ San Diego Padres	2-1	Johnson (7-6)	Ashby (10-5)		36,900	33-45
79	June 25	@ San Diego Padres	0-6	Langston (2-1)	Cloude (3-7)	Wall (1)	32,626	33-46
80	June 26	@ Arizona Diamondbacks	8-13	Sodowsky (2-4)	Spoljaric (3-2)		49,328	33-47
81	June 27	@ Arizona Diamondbacks	6-4	Fassero (6-5)	Benes (6-8)	Slocumb (3)	48,488	34-47
82	June 28	@ Arizona Diamondbacks	2-3	Embree (2-0)	Ayala (0-6)		47,968	34-48
83	June 30	Colorado Rockies	4-6	Astacio (6-8)	Johnson (7-7)	Munoz (1)	28,821	34-49

July

#	Date	Opponent	Score	Win	Loss	Save	Attendance	Record
84	July 1	Colorado Rockies	9-5	Cloude (4-7)	Saipe (0-1)		25,551	35-49
85	July 2	Colorado Rockies	10-3	Swift (8-4)	Kile (5-11)		32,523	36-49
86	July 3	@ Texas Rangers	8-2	Fassero (7-5)	Burkett (4-9)		45,233	37-49
87	July 4	@ Texas Rangers	2-9	Sele (12-5)	Moyer (5-7)		46,067	37-50
88	July 5	@ Texas Rangers	4-8	Hernandez (3-1)	Johnson (7-8)		38,053	37-51
89	July 9	Anaheim Angels	8-6	Fassero (8-5)	Olivares (5-5)	Timlin (2)	24,210	38-51
90	July 10	Anaheim Angels	3-5	Percival (2-3)	Ayala (0-7)		28,869	38-52
91	July 11	Anaheim Angels	2-0	Johnson (8-8)	Sparks (3-1)		35,788	39-52
92	July 12	Anaheim Angels	5-8	Dickson (9-6)	Swift (8-5)	Percival (26)	32,797	39-53
93	July 13	Texas Rangers	10-3	Cloude (5-7)	Van Poppel (1-2)		25,170	40-53
94	July 14	Texas Rangers	6-3	Fassero (9-5)	Burkett (5-10)	Timlin (3)	25,545	41-53
95	July 15	Minnesota Twins	4-1	Moyer (6-7)	Hawkins (5-9)	Timlin (4)	23,250	42-53
96	July 16	Minnesota Twins	3-0	Johnson (9-8)	Radke (9-8)		24,974	43-53
97	July 17	Kansas City Royals	18-5	Swift (9-5)	Rusch (6-11)		29,500	44-53
98	July 18	Kansas City Royals	8-5	Ayala (1-7)	Service (3-2)		42,633	45-53
99	July 19	Kansas City Royals	1-4	Belcher (9-8)	Fassero (9-6)	Montgomery (22)	30,851	45-54
100	July 21	@ Tampa Bay Devil Rays	8-3	Moyer (7-7)	Alvarez (4-8)		30,298	46-54
101	July 22	@ Tampa Bay Devil Rays	5-7	Lopez (6-2)	Johnson (9-9)	Hernandez (18)	31,558	46-55
102	July 24	@ Baltimore Orioles	4-7	Mussina (8-5)	Swift (9-6)	Benitez (13)	48,184	46-56
103	July 25	@ Baltimore Orioles	4-2	Fassero (10-6)	Kamieniecki (2-3)	Timlin (5)	48,365	47-56
104	July 26	@ Baltimore Orioles	10-4	Moyer (8-7)	Erickson (11-8)		48,199	48-56
105	July 28	Cleveland Indians	3-4	Nagy (9-6)	Johnson (9-10)	Jackson (26)	31,124	48-57
106	July 29	Cleveland Indians	7-8	Ogea (4-2)	McCarthy (0-1)	Jackson (27)	25,953	48-58
107	July 30	Cleveland Indians	8-9	Shuey (3-1)	Wells (0-2)		31,081	48-59
108	July 31	New York Yankees	3-5	Irabu (10-4)	Fassero (10-7)	Rivera (29)	43,837	48-60

August

#	Date	Opponent	Score	Win	Loss	Save	Attendance	Record
109	August 1	New York Yankees	2-5	Wells (13-2)	Moyer (8-8)		53,840	48-61
110	August 2	New York Yankees	6-3	Wells (1-2)	Cone (15-4)	Timlin (6)	47,872	49-61
111	August 3	Boston Red Sox	3-1	Cloude (6-7)	Wasdin (5-4)	Timlin (7)	27,887	50-61
112	August 4	Boston Red Sox	1-2	Avery (8-4)	McCarthy (0-2)	Gordon (32)	29,621	50-62
113	August 7	@ Detroit Tigers	6-3	Slocumb (2-4)	Crow (1-1)	Timlin (8)	DH	51-62
114	August 7	@ Detroit Tigers	7-1	Moyer (9-8)	Moehler (12-8)		29,039	52-62
115	August 8	@ Detroit Tigers	9-3	Cloude (7-7)	Powell (2-3)		37,495	53-62
116	August 9	@ Detroit Tigers	6-3	Wells (2-2)	Runyan (1-3)	Timlin (9)	27,987	54-62
117	August 11	@ Toronto Blue Jays	4-7	Carpenter (7-6)	Fassero (10-8)	Quantrill (3)	33,137	54-63
118	August 12	@ Toronto Blue Jays	5-11	Rodriguez (2-3)	Ayala (1-8)		39,139	54-64
119	August 14	@ Chicago White Sox	2-14	Sirotka (12-10)	Cloude (7-8)		22,713	54-65
120	August 15	@ Chicago White Sox	13-7	Swift (10-6)	Navarro (8-14)		21,537	55-65
121	August 16	@ Chicago White Sox	3-5	Foulke (3-1)	Fassero (10-9)	Simas (15)	25,471	55-66
122	August 17	Detroit Tigers	3-1	Moyer (10-8)	Moehler (12-9)	Timlin (10)	38,639	56-66
123	August 18	Detroit Tigers	6-7	Greisinger (2-7)	Ayala (1-9)	Jones (21)	24,136	56-67
124	August 19	Toronto Blue Jays	2-16	Hentgen (11-9)	Cloude (7-9)	Stieb (1)	26,258	56-68
125	August 20	Toronto Blue Jays	0-7	Clemens (15-6)	Swift (10-7)		26,642	56-69
126	August 21	Chicago White Sox	5-4	Paniagua (1-0)	Foulke (3-2)	Timlin (11)	34,421	57-69
127	August 22	Chicago White Sox	5-4	Timlin (2-3)	Navarro (8-15)		43,596	58-69
128	August 23	Chicago White Sox	3-2	Spoljaric (4-2)	Snyder (4-2)	Paniagua (1)	35,159	59-69
129	August 24	Chicago White Sox	11-10	Cloude (8-9)	Sirotka (12-12)	Timlin (12)	27,087	60-69
130	August 25	@ Cleveland Indians	4-10	Nagy (11-9)	Swift (10-8)		43,113	60-70
131	August 26	@ Cleveland Indians	3-5	Burba (11-9)	Fassero (10-10)	Jackson (33)	43,091	60-71
132	August 27	@ Cleveland Indians	10-4	Moyer (11-8)	Wright (11-8)		43,142	61-71
133	August 28	@ New York Yankees	3-10	Hernandez (10-4)	Spoljaric (4-3)		49,789	61-72
134	August 29	@ New York Yankees	6-11	Pettitte (15-8)	Cloude (8-10)		55,146	61-73
135	August 30	@ New York Yankees	13-3	Swift (11-8)	Irabu (11-7)		55,341	62-73
136	August 31	@ Boston Red Sox	1-5	Saberhagen (12-6)	Fassero (10-11)		28,553	62-74

September

#	Date	Opponent	Score	Win	Loss	Save	Attendance	Record
137	September 1	@ Boston Red Sox	7-3	Moyer (12-8)	Lowe (3-8)		28,150	63-74
138	September 2	@ Boston Red Sox	3-7	Gordon (7-3)	Ayala (1-10)		25,813	63-75
139	September 4	Baltimore Orioles	1-10	Guzman (9-14)	Spoljaric (4-4)		27,404	63-76
140	September 5	Baltimore Orioles	6-5	McCarthy (1-2)	Benitez (5-4)	Timlin (13)	43,831	64-76
141	September 6	Baltimore Orioles	2-5	Mussina (13-8)	Fassero (10-12)	Rhodes (4)	30,285	64-77
142	September 7	Baltimore Orioles	11-1	Moyer (13-8)	Drabek (6-11)		24,229	65-77
143	September 8	Tampa Bay Devil Rays	0-10	Alvarez (6-13)	Suzuki (0-1)		20,679	65-78
144	September 9	Tampa Bay Devil Rays	5-2	Abbott (1-0)	Arrojo (13-12)	Timlin (14)	22,256	66-78
145	September 11	@ Kansas City Royals	6-3	Fassero (11-12)	Barber (2-3)	Timlin (15)	DH	67-78
146	September 11	@ Kansas City Royals	5-8	Appier (1-0)	Swift (11-9)	Rusch (1)	18,874	67-79
147	September 12	@ Kansas City Royals	2-5	Belcher (13-12)	Moyer (13-9)	Montgomery (33)	28,091	67-80
	September 13	@ Kansas City Royals	Cancelled (rain)					67-80
148	September 14	@ Minnesota Twins	10-3	Suzuki (1-1)	Radke (11-14)		9,711	68-80
149	September 15	@ Minnesota Twins	12-7	Abbott (2-0)	Rodriguez (4-6)		8,024	69-80
150	September 16	@ Oakland Athletics	4-1	Fassero (12-12)	Heredia (3-2)	Timlin (16)	12,371	70-80
151	September 17	@ Oakland Athletics	8-0	Moyer (14-9)	Candiotti (11-16)		11,707	71-80
152	September 18	@ Anaheim Angels	5-3	Timlin (3-3)	DeLucia (2-6)		39,902	72-80
153	September 19	@ Anaheim Angels	3-5	McDowell (5-3)	Spoljaric (4-5)	Percival (41)	42,833	72-81
154	September 20	@ Anaheim Angels	1-3	Olivares (9-8)	Abbott (2-1)	Percival (42)	42,972	72-82
155	September 21	Oakland Athletics	5-2	Paniagua (2-0)	Heredia (3-3)	Timlin (17)	30,076	73-82
156	September 22	Oakland Athletics	7-6	Moyer (15-9)	Witasick (1-2)	Timlin (18)	20,908	74-82
157	September 23	Oakland Athletics	3-8	Mathews (6-4)	Slocumb (2-5)	Taylor (33)	21,182	74-83
158	September 24	Texas Rangers	3-9	Sele (19-11)	Suzuki (1-2)		22,891	74-84
159	September 25	Texas Rangers	15-4	Abbott (3-1)	Loaiza (9-11)		39,325	75-84
160	September 26	Texas Rangers	5-2	Fassero (13-12)	Gunderson (0-3)	Timlin (19)	33,147	76-84
161	September 27	Texas Rangers	6-12	Fossas (1-3)	Spoljaric (4-6)		37,986	76-85

== Player stats ==
=== Batting ===
= Indicates team leader

==== Starters by position ====
Note: Pos = Position; G = Games played; AB = At bats; R = Runs; H = Hits; HR = Home runs; RBI = Runs batted in; Avg. = Batting average; Slg. = Slugging average; SB = Stolen bases

Pos	Player	G	AB	R	H	HR	RBI	Avg.	Slg.	SB
C	Dan Wilson	96	325	39	82	9	44	.252	.392	2
1B	David Segui	143	522	79	159	19	84	.305	.487	3
2B	Joey Cora	131	519	111	166	6	32	.276	.370	15
3B	Russ Davis	141	502	68	130	20	82	.259	.442	4
SS	Alex Rodriguez	161	686	123	213	42	124	.310	.560	46
LF	Glenallen Hill	74	259	37	75	12	33	.290	.521	1
CF	Ken Griffey Jr.	161	633	120	180	56	146	.284	.611	20
RF	Jay Buhner	72	244	33	59	15	45	.242	.463	0
DH	Edgar Martínez	154	556	86	179	29	102	.322	.429	1

==== Other batters ====
Note: G = Games played; AB = At bats; R = Runs; H = Hits; HR = Home runs; RBI = Runs batted in; Avg. = Batting average; Slg. = Slugging average; SB = Stolen bases

Player	G	AB	R	H	HR	RBI	Avg.	Slg.	SB
Rob Ducey	97	217	30	52	5	23	.240	.410	0
Shane Monahan	62	211	17	51	4	28	.242	.346	1
Rich Amaral	73	134	25	37	1	4	.276	.343	11
John Marzano	50	133	13	31	4	12	.233	.391	0
Raúl Ibañez	37	98	12	25	2	12	.255	.408	0
Joe Oliver	29	85	12	19	2	10	.224	.329	1
Rico Rossy	37	81	12	16	1	4	.198	.309	0
David Bell	21	80	11	26	0	8	.325	.425	0
Ryan Radmanovich	25	69	5	15	2	10	.217	.362	1
Charles Gipson	44	51	11	12	0	2	.235	.255	2
Jeff Huson	31	49	8	8	1	4	.163	.245	1
Rick Wilkins	19	41	5	8	1	4	.195	.341	0
Carlos Guillén	10	39	9	13	0	5	.333	.410	2
Robert Pérez	17	35	3	6	2	6	.171	.371	0
Dave McCarty	8	18	1	5	1	2	.278	.444	1
Giomar Guevara	11	13	4	3	0	0	.231	.385	0
Rickey Cradle	5	7	0	1	0	2	.143	.143	1
Raúl Chávez	1	1	0	0	0	0	.000	.000	0

=== Starting pitchers ===
Note: G = Games pitched; IP = Innings pitched; W = Wins; L = Losses; ERA = Earned run average; SO = Strikeouts; BB = Walks allowed

Player	G	IP	W	L	ERA	SO	BB
Jamie Moyer	34	234.1	15	9	3.53	158	42
Jeff Fassero	32	224.2	13	12	3.97	176	66
Randy Johnson	23	160.0	9	10	4.33	213	60
Ken Cloude	30	155.1	8	10	6.37	114	80
Bill Swift	29	144.2	11	9	5.85	77	51
Mac Suzuki	6	26.1	1	2	7.18	19	15
Paul Abbott	4	24.2	3	1	4.01	22	10

==== Other pitchers ====
Note: G = Games pitched; IP = Innings pitched; W = Wins; L = Losses; ERA = Earned run average; SO = Strikeouts; BB = Walks allowed

Player	G	IP	W	L	ERA	SO	BB
Jim Bullinger	2	5.2	0	1	15.88	4	2

===== Relief pitchers =====
Note: G = Games pitched; IP = Innings pitched; W = Wins; L = Losses; SV = Saves; ERA = Earned run average; SO = Strikeouts; BB = Walks allowed

Player	G	IP	W	L	SV	ERA	SO	BB
Mike Timlin	70	79.1	3	3	19	2.95	60	16
Bobby Ayala	62	75.1	1	10	8	7.29	68	26
Heathcliff Slocumb	57	67.2	2	5	3	5.32	51	44
Paul Spoljaric	53	83.1	4	6	0	6.48	55	89
Bob Wells	30	51.2	2	2	0	6.10	29	16
Greg McCarthy	29	23.1	1	2	0	5.01	25	17
Tony Fossas	23	11.1	0	3	0	8.74	10	6
José Paniagua	18	22.0	2	0	1	2.05	16	5
Steve Gajkowski	9	8.2	0	0	0	7.27	3	4
Felipe Lira	7	15.2	1	0	0	4.60	16	5
David Holdridge	7	6.2	0	0	0	4.05	6	4
Andrew Lorraine	4	3.2	0	0	0	2.45	0	4

=== Ken Griffey Jr.'s 56 home runs ===
Home Run	Game	Date	Inning	Location	Opposing Pitcher	Team
1	1	March 31	5th	Seattle	Charles Nagy	Cleveland Indians
2	3	April 3	5th	Seattle	Derek Lowe	Boston Red Sox
3	4	April 4	2nd	Seattle	Brian Rose	Boston Red Sox
4	11	April 12	5th	Boston	Tim Wakefield	Boston Red Sox
5	12	April 13	1st	Cleveland	Dave Burba	Cleveland Indians
6	12	April 13	7th	Cleveland	José Mesa	Cleveland Indians
7	16	April 17	3rd	Minnesota	Eric Milton	Minnesota Twins
8	19	April 20	3rd	Seattle	Chris Haney	Kansas City Royals
9	26	April 29	7th	New York	Mike Stanton	New York Yankees
10	27	April 30	1st	New York	David Wells	New York Yankees
11	27	April 30	3rd	New York	David Wells	New York Yankees
12	29	May 2	1st	Seattle	Justin Thompson	Detroit Tigers
13	31	May 5	5th	Seattle	Scott Eyre	Toronto Blue Jays
14	34	May 8	3rd	Seattle	Woody Williams	Toronto Blue Jays
15	36	May 10	8th	Seattle	Dan Plesac	Toronto Blue Jays
16	43	May 18	4th	Toronto	Roger Clemens	Toronto Blue Jays
17	46	May 21	4th	Texas	John Burkett	Texas Rangers
18	49	May 24	6th	Seattle	Dennis Springer	Tampa Bay Devil Rays
19	55	May 31	8th	Tampa	Albie Lopez	Tampa Bay Devil Rays
20	57	June 2	3rd	Baltimore	Doug Drabek	Baltimore Orioles
21	57	June 3	10th	Baltimore	Norm Charlton	Baltimore Orioles
22	59	June 4	1st	Seattle	Ken Hill	Anaheim Angels
23	61	June 6	3rd	Seattle	Dave Mlicki	Los Angeles Dodgers
24	62	June 7	9th	Seattle	Mark Guthrie	Los Angeles Dodgers
25	64	June 9	6th	San Francisco	Julián Tavárez	San Francisco Giants
26	66	June 11	8th	Oakland	Mike Oquist	Oakland Athletics
27	72	June 18	1st	Anaheim	Jarrod Washburn	Anaheim Angels
28	73	June 19	4th	Seattle	Blake Stein	Oakland Athletics
29	77	June 23	1st	Seattle	Joey Hamilton	San Diego Padres
30	78	June 24	9th	San Diego	Roberto Ramírez	San Diego Padres
31	80	June 26	3rd	Arizona	Jeff Suppan	Arizona Diamondbacks
32	82	June 28	6th	Arizona	Brian Anderson	Arizona Diamondbacks
33	83	June 30	1st	Seattle	Pedro Astacio	Colorado Rockies
34	84	July 1	3rd	Seattle	Mike Saipe	Colorado Rockies
35	85	July 2	2nd	Seattle	Darryl Kile	Colorado Rockies
36	89	July 9	6th	Seattle	Pep Harris	Anaheim Angels
37	90	July !0	7th	Seattle	Chuck Finley	Anaheim Angels
38	94	July 14	3rd	Seattle	John Burkett	Texas Rangers
39	94	July 14	7th	Seattle	Scott Bailes	Texas Rangers
40	100	July 21	4th	Tampa	Wilson Álvarez	Tampa Bay Devil Rays
41	107	July 30	5th	Seattle	Dave Burba	Cleveland Indians
42	120	August 15	1st	Chicago	Jaime Navarro	Chicago White Sox
43	128	August 23	4th	Seattle	John Snyder	Chicago White Sox
44	129	August 24	4th	Seattle	Mike Sirotka	Chicago White Sox
45	134	August 29	6th	New York	Andy Pettitte	New York Yankees
46	135	August 30	2nd	New York	Hideki Irabu	New York Yankees
47	135	August 30	8th	New York	Mike Buddie	New York Yankees
48	140	September 5	8th	Seattle	Armando Benítez	Baltimore Orioles
49	142	September 7	5th	Seattle	Pete Smith	Baltimore Orioles
50	142	September 7	6th	Seattle	Jimmy Key	Baltimore Orioles
51	147	September 12	3rd	Kansas City	Tim Belcher	Kansas City Royals
52	149	September 15	7th	Minnesota	Eddie Guardado	Minnesota Twins
53	151	September 17	1st	Oakland	Tom Candiotti	Oakland Athletica
54	156	September 22	3rd	Seattle	Jay Witasick	Oakland Athletics
55	156	September 22	5th	Seattle	Jay Witasick	Oakland Athletics
56	159	September 25	6th	Seattle	Eric Gunderson	Texas Rangers

== Awards and honors ==
- Ken Griffey Jr. tied his franchise record for most home runs in one season (56)
- Alex Rodriguez, third member to join the 40–40 club
- Griffey and Rodriguez were both selected to the MLB All-Star Game and won Silver Slugger Awards. Griffey also won a Gold Glove Award.

== Farm system ==
The Mariners had the worst ranked farm system, according to Baseball America.

Level	Team	League	Manager
AAA	Tacoma Rainiers	Pacific Coast League	Dave Myers
AA	Orlando Rays	Southern League	Dan Rohn
A	Lancaster JetHawks	California League	Rick Burleson
A	Wisconsin Timber Rattlers	Midwest League	Gary Varsho
A-Short Season	Everett AquaSox	Northwest League	Terry Pollreisz
Rookie	AZL Mariners	Arizona League	Darrin Garner
