= Blues Stadium (disambiguation) =

Blues Stadium was a previously-used stadium name prominently associated with Kansas City Municipal Stadium.

Blues Stadium may also refer to:

- Tim McCarver Stadium, previously-used stadium name from 1968 to 1977 in Memphis, Tennessee.

== See also ==
- Cardiff City Stadium, home ground of Cardiff Blues rugby team
- St Andrew's (stadium), Birmingham England, home ground of Birmingham City F.C., also known as "Blues"
