= Tim McCarver Stadium =

Demolished Minor League Baseball park in Memphis, Tennessee, USA

McCarver Stadium
- Timmy Mac
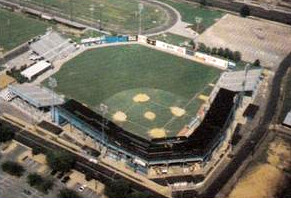
- Interactive map of McCarver Stadium
- Full name: Tim McCarver Stadium
- Former names: Fairgrounds Diamond #3 (1963–1967) Blues Stadium (1968–1977) Tim McCarver Stadium (1978–1997)
- Location: Memphis, Tennessee; United States
- Coordinates: 35°07′25″N 89°58′48″W
- Capacity: 8,800
- Surface: AstroTurf (infield); Grass (outfield)

Construction
- Opened: 1963 (Fairgrounds #3); April 16, 1968 (stadium)
- Renovated: 1967–1968
- Closed: September 6, 1999
- Demolished: 2005
- Cost: $135,000 ($1.3 million in 2025 dollars)
- General contractor: Howard G. Lewis Construction Co.

Tenants
- Memphis Blues (TL/IL) 1968–1976; Memphis Chicks (SL) 1978–1997; Memphis Redbirds (PCL) 1998–1999

Tim McCarver Stadium was a Minor League Baseball stadium situated in Memphis, Tennessee, on the grounds of the Mid-South Fairgrounds. It was primarily used for baseball and was the home ballpark of the Memphis Blues (1968–1976), Memphis Chicks (1978–1997), and Memphis Redbirds (1998–1999). The stadium opened as a replacement for Russwood Park, which hosted the city's former minor league teams. The facility closed at the end of the 1999 baseball season and remained deserted for over six years until its demolition in 2005.

Originally known as Fairgrounds Diamond #3, it served as an American Legion field for United States Veterans beginning in 1963. In 1967, the diamond was converted into a stadium to accommodate the Memphis Blues. The franchise began play in the Texas League in 1968 but moved to the International League in 1974. Named Blues Stadium, the ballpark hosted to the team through the 1976 season, after which the franchise moved to Charleston, West Virginia, as the Charleston Charlies. After a season without a team, the Memphis Chicks were established as members of the Southern League in 1978. In October 1977, the franchise changed the name of the ballpark to Tim McCarver Stadium after Memphis native Tim McCarver. Nicknamed Timmy Mac and Chicks Park, the stadium hosted the Chicks from their inaugural season until moving to Jackson and becoming the West Tenn Diamond Jaxx in 1998. After the Chicks' departure, the Memphis Redbirds played in the aging ballpark for two seasons while a new stadium was constructed. The Redbirds left after the 1999 season for the new AutoZone Park.

Amidst the stadium' 36-season run, McCarver saw occasional use as a venue for college baseball, Under-18 baseball tournaments, and softball events. It was the site of two minor league all-star games and eleven no-hitters.

== Notable events ==
=== No-hitters ===
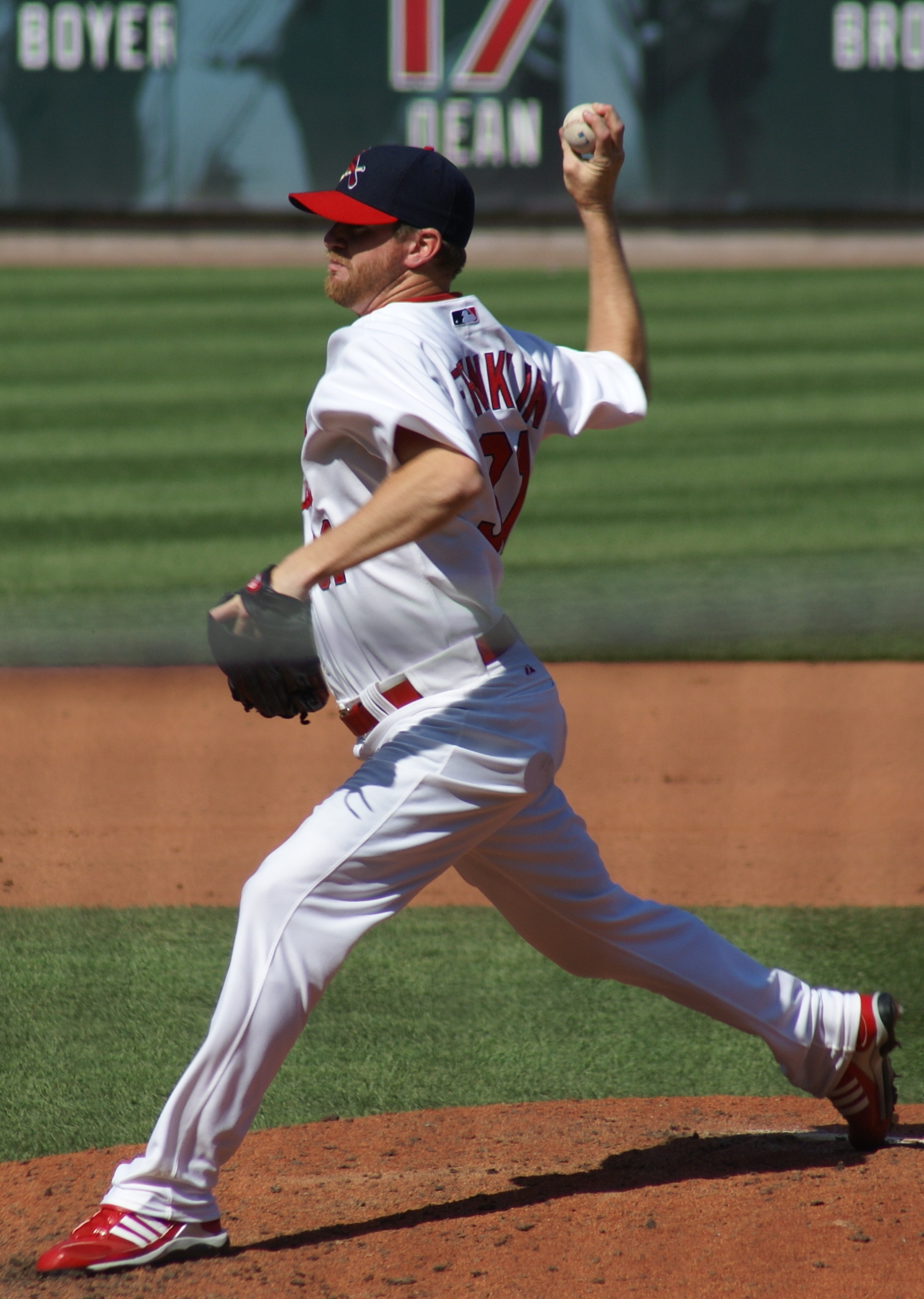
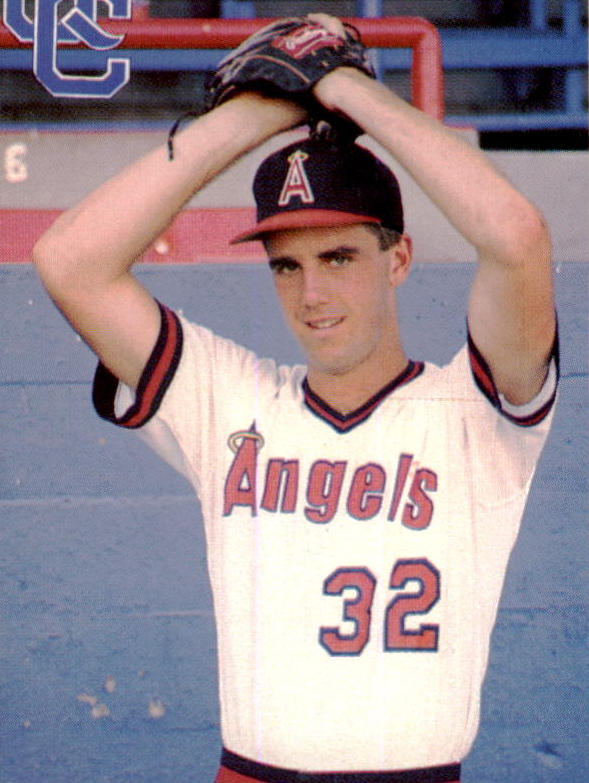
Ryan Franklin (left) and David Holdridge (right) were two of the three pitchers in a combined no-hit effort in a 4–0 victory on April 14, 1997.

Tim McCarver Stadium was the setting for eleven no-hitters. The first took place on May 24, 1968, when Bob Watkins of the visiting Dallas–Fort Worth Spurs, pitched a nine-inning no-hitter, winning 2–0 against the Blues. In a rare occurrence, the second no-hitter occurred two days later when the Spurs' Luis Peñalver recorded a 3–0 win over the Blues on May 26. The third, a 1–0 win over the Albuquerque Dodgers, was thrown by Memphis' Steve Renko on July 21, 1968. On April 20, 1969, Les Rohr pitched a no-hitter against the San Antonio Missions in the second game of a seven-inning doubleheader, winning 8–0. On May 13, 1972, Bob Forsch no-hit the Blues in seven innings as the Arkansas Travelers defeated Memphis, 4–0. On May 30, 1976, Charleston Charlies' pitcher Rick Langford threw a nine-inning no-hitter, winning 11–0. Many believed Langford had lost his no-hit bid in the sixth inning due to a play involving Charles shortstop Craig Reynolds hurrying his throw that pulled the first baseman off the bag. Although it was first ruled a hit, the box score showed it recorded as an error.

On August 20, 1978, the Chicks' Mike Finlayson pitched a seven-inning no-hitter in the first game of a doubleheader against the Montgomery Rebels. On July 2, 1986, Mitch McKelvey no-hit the Columbus Astros in a 16–0 Memphis win. On August 8, 1993, Rodney Myers pitched a no-hitter in a 3–0 win against the Knoxville Smokies. On August 8, 1995, Luis Andújar threw a nine-inning no-hitter against Memphis, as the Birmingham Barons defeated the Chicks, 1–0. The final no-hitter at the ballpark occurred on April 14, 1997, when Ryan Franklin, Scott Simmons, and David Holdridge combined to no-hit the Chattanooga Lookouts in a 4–0 win.

== See also ==
- List of baseball parks in Memphis, Tennessee

Preceded by first ballpark	Home of the Memphis Redbirds; 1998 – 1999	Succeeded by AutoZone Park
