= Bill Whitby =

American baseball player (1943-2016)

- Pitcher
- Born: July 29, 1943; Crewe, Virginia, U.S.
- Died: March 12, 2016 (aged 72); Huntersville, North Carolina, U.S.
- Batted: Right Threw: Right

MLB debut
- June 17, 1964, for the Minnesota Twins

Last MLB appearance
- June 25, 1964, for the Minnesota Twins

MLB statistics
- Win–loss record: 0–0
- Earned run average: 8.53
- Strikeouts: 2
- Stats at Baseball Reference

Teams
- Minnesota Twins (1964)

William Edward Whitby (July 29, 1943 – March 12, 2016) was an American professional baseball player, a right-handed pitcher who appeared in four games in Major League Baseball for the Minnesota Twins during the 1964 season. Whitby was born in Crewe, Virginia; he stood 6 feet 1 inch (1.85 m) tall and weighed 190 pounds (86 kg). He signed with the Twins in 1961 after graduating from Victoria High School.

Whitby's MLB audition occurred in the middle of his fourth season in pro baseball. He made four appearances as a relief pitcher, three against the Cleveland Indians and one against the Detroit Tigers. He did not earn a decision and posted an 8.53 earned run average in 61/3 innings pitched with two strikeouts and one base on balls. Of the six hits he allowed, three were home runs.

During his minor league career, which lasted for ten seasons, nine of them in the Minnesota farm system, he reached double digits in wins three times. Whitby died at age 72 in Huntersville, North Carolina.
