= Steve Gajkowski =

American baseball player (born 1969)

- Pitcher
- Born: December 30, 1969 (age 56); Seattle, Washington, U.S.
- Batted: Right Threw: Right

MLB debut
- May 25, 1998, for the Seattle Mariners

Last MLB appearance
- September 27, 1998, for the Seattle Mariners

MLB statistics
- Win–loss record: 0–0
- Earned run average: 7.27
- Strikeouts: 3
- Stats at Baseball Reference

Teams
- Seattle Mariners (1998)

Stephen Robert Gajkowski (born December 30, 1969) is an American former Major League Baseball (MLB) pitcher who pitched in nine games for the Seattle Marinersin 1998.

Gajkowski was drafted by the Cleveland Indians in the 18th round of the 1990 MLB draft out of Bellevue Community College. He played his first professional season with the Rookie-level Burlington Indians that summer. Cleveland released him in spring training in 1992, and he signed with the Chicago White Sox. He progressed to Triple-A in 1996 and signed with the Mariners that offseason. After another full season in Triple-A, he made his MLB debut on May 25, 1998. In 9 relief appearances, he no decisions and a 7.27 ERA in 8 2/3 innings. He became a free agent after the season and signed with the Chicago Cubs but did not return to the majors. He played his last minor league season with the Oakland Athletics' Double-A Midland RockHounds and Triple-A Sacramento River Cats in 2000.
