= Ryan Franklin =

American baseball player (born 1973)

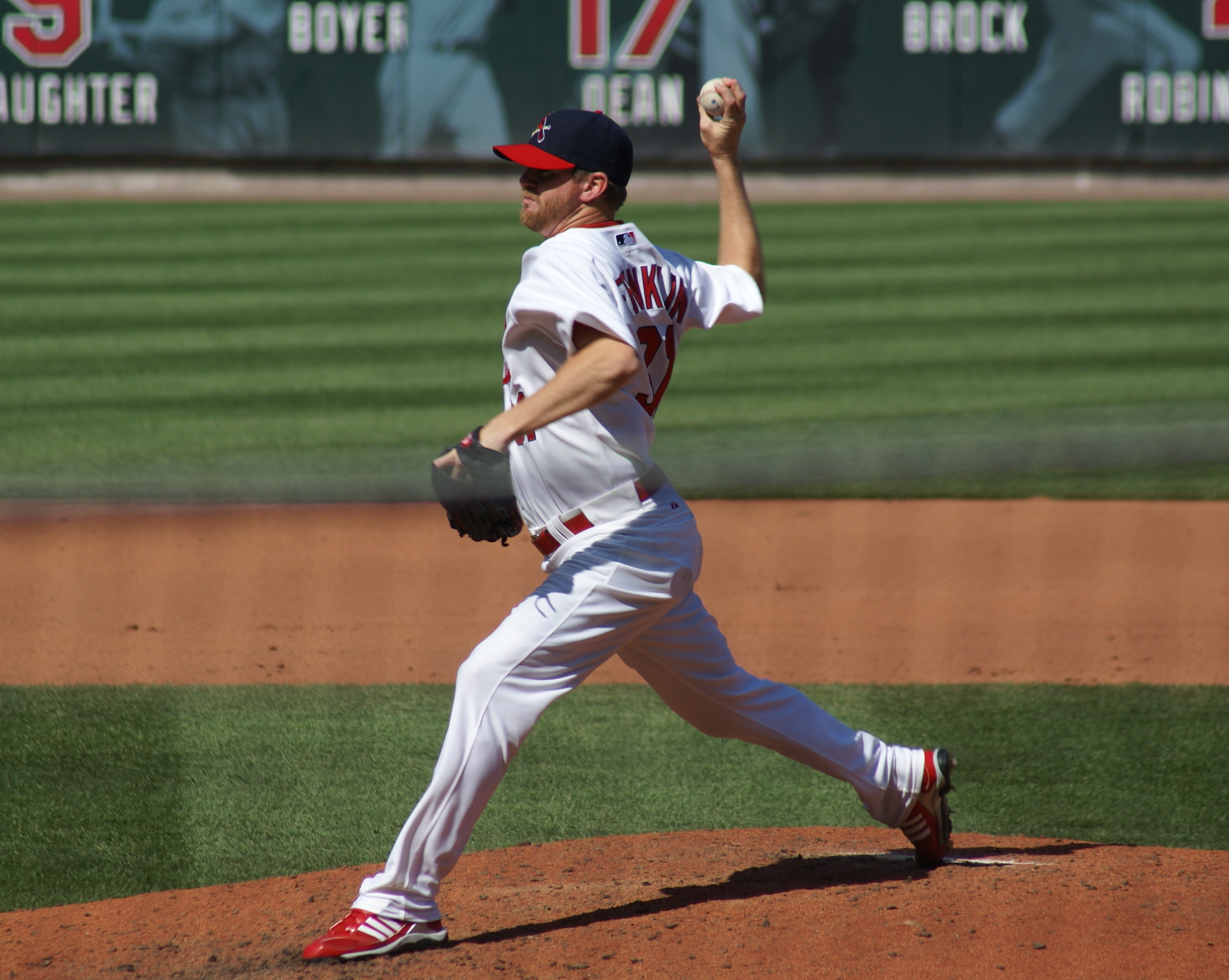
- Franklin with the St. Louis Cardinals
- Pitcher
- Born: March 5, 1973 (age 53); Fort Smith, Arkansas, U.S.
- Batted: Right Threw: Right

MLB debut
- May 15, 1999, for the Seattle Mariners

Last MLB appearance
- June 28, 2011, for the St. Louis Cardinals

MLB statistics
- Win–loss record: 62–76
- Earned run average: 4.14
- Strikeouts: 668
- Saves: 84
- Stats at Baseball Reference

Teams
- Seattle Mariners (1999, 2001–2005); Philadelphia Phillies (2006); Cincinnati Reds (2006); St. Louis Cardinals (2007–2011)

Career highlights and awards
- All-Star (2009)
Medals
Men's baseball
Representing United States
Men's baseball
Gold medal – first place	2000 Sydney	Team competition

Ryan Ray Franklin (born March 5, 1973) is an American former professional baseball pitcher, who played in Major League Baseball (MLB) for the Seattle Mariners, Philadelphia Phillies, Cincinnati Reds, and St. Louis Cardinals. Franklin currently works in the Cardinals’ front office.

== Early life ==
He was born in Fort Smith, Arkansas, and grew up in Spiro, Oklahoma. He graduated from high school in Spiro in 1991 and was named to the All-State baseball team. He went to Seminole Junior College, in Oklahoma, where he had a 20–0 win–loss record over two years.

== Playing career ==
=== Seattle Mariners ===
Franklin was drafted by the Seattle Mariners in the 23rd round of the 1992 MLB draft but chose to return to school. He signed his first MLB contract with the team on May 21, 1993. He made his MLB debut in 1999, appearing in six games. In 2000, he began the season in Triple-A, and then decided (with club permission) to not play in MLB during September in order to participate in the Olympics. During those Olympics in Sydney, he and his teammates won a gold medal, defeating Cuba 4–0 in the title game. After missing the 2000 season in the big leagues, Franklin posted a strong spring training and won a job in the Mariners bullpen, appearing in 38 games. The next season, Franklin began the season in the bullpen but after the first half of the season, was moved to the rotation. He finished with a record of 7–5 in 41 appearances, 12 starts. In 2003, Franklin began in the rotation and was one of the Mariners most consistent starters, posting an ERA of 3.57 in 212 innings. He tied for the Major League lead in home runs allowed in 2003, with 34.

In 2004, Franklin and the whole Seattle team struggled, losing 99 games. Franklin went 4–16 with a 4.90 ERA in 200 innings. He struck out a career high 104. In 2005, he went 8–15 with a career high 5.10 in 190 innings. He struck out 93. After the 2005 season, Franklin filed for free agency.

=== Philadelphia Phillies ===
On January 13, 2006, Franklin signed a one-year, $2.5 million contract with the Philadelphia Phillies. Franklin shifted back to a bullpen role, appearing in 46 games.

=== Cincinnati Reds ===
On August 7, 2006, Franklin was traded to the Cincinnati Reds for a player to be named later, who turned out to be minor league pitcher Zac Stott. Franklin pitched the rest of the season out of the bullpen, appearing in 20 games.

=== St. Louis Cardinals ===
On January 22, 2007, Franklin signed with the St. Louis Cardinals on a one-year, $1 million contract. He signed a two-year, $5 million contract extension with a $2.75 million club option for 2010 on July 5, 2007. He was promoted to closer on May 17, 2008. Franklin was named to the 2009 All-Star Game roster. On September 1, 2009, Franklin signed a two-year, $6.5 million contract extension with the Cardinals. In 2009, he finished the regular season with a 1.92 ERA, and 38 saves.

On April 19, 2011, Franklin (who blew two saves in 29 chances in the 2010 season) was removed from his closer role after (among other struggles on the mound) blowing four saves in five chances to start the 2011 season.

He was released on June 29, after recording an 8.46 ERA, giving up 44 hits (.367 batting average against), nine home runs, walking seven and striking out 17 in 27 2/3 innings for a 1.84 WHIP in 21 games with the Cardinals in 2011. He retired on December 9, 2011.

== International career ==
Franklin was a member of the gold medal-winning Team USA at the 2000 Olympics, where he had a 3–0 pitching record in four appearances.

== Personal life ==
He is married to Angie Romberg, and the couple has four children: Logan, Teegan, Casen, and Kaylin. He and his family live in Shawnee, Oklahoma. His nephew, Kohl, is a professional baseball player in the Chicago Cubs organization.

On August 2, 2005, Franklin became the eighth MLB player, and second Mariner, to test positive for steroid use, receiving a 10-day suspension. On December 13, 2007, he was named in the Mitchell Report.

== See also ==
- List of Major League Baseball players named in the Mitchell Report
