= Rodney Myers =

American baseball player (born 1969)

- Pitcher
- Born: June 26, 1969 (age 57); Rockford, Illinois, U.S.
- Batted: Right Threw: Right

Professional debut
- MLB: April 3, 1996, for the Chicago Cubs
- NPB: July 4, 2004, for the Hanshin Tigers

Last appearance
- MLB: June 1, 2004, for the Los Angeles Dodgers
- NPB: September 30, 2004, for the Hanshin Tigers

MLB statistics
- Win–loss record: 7–5
- Earned run average: 5.07
- Strikeouts: 161

NPB statistics
- Win–loss record: 1–2
- Earned run average: 4.07
- Strikeouts: 8
- Stats at Baseball Reference

Teams
- Chicago Cubs (1996–1999); San Diego Padres (2000–2002); Los Angeles Dodgers (2003–2004); Hanshin Tigers (2004)

Rodney Luther Myers (born June 26, 1969) is an American former professional baseball pitcher. He played in Major League Baseball (MLB) for the Chicago Cubs, San Diego Padres, and Los Angeles Dodgers, and in Nippon Professional Baseball (NPB) for the Hanshin Tigers.

Myers was drafted by the Kansas City Royals in the 12th round of the 1990 Major League Baseball draft out of the University of Wisconsin–Madison. In the Royals system, he played for the Eugene Emeralds (A-, 1990), Appleton Foxes (A, 1991), Lethbridge Mounties (Rookie, 1992), Memphis Chicks (AA, 1993–1994), and Omaha Royals (AAA, 1995).

Myers was selected by the Chicago Cubs in the Rule 5 Draft in 1996 and spent the entire season in the Cubs major league bullpen. He alternated between the Cubs and their triple A team (Iowa Cubs) from 1997–1999 and then was traded to the San Diego Padres for Gary Matthews Jr.

Myers pitched for the Padres from 2000–2002 and then for the Los Angeles Dodgers for two seasons. After being released in midseason in 2004, he signed with the Hanshin Tigers in Japan, where he finished the season. After playing independent league ball in 2005, Myers retired from baseball.
