= David Holdridge =

American baseball player (born 1969)

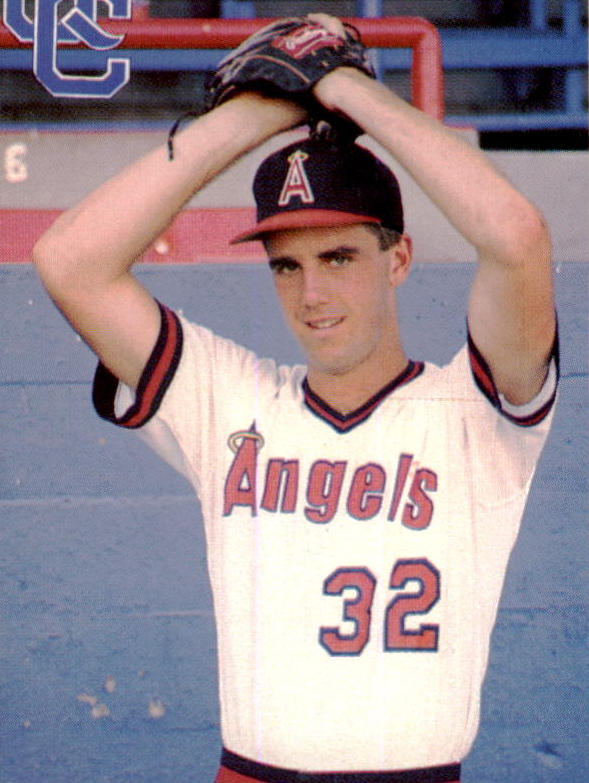
- Holdridge with the Quad City Angels c. 1988
- Pitcher
- Born: February 5, 1969 (age 57); Wayne, Michigan, U.S.
- Batted: Right Threw: Right

MLB debut
- August 8, 1998, for the Seattle Mariners

Last MLB appearance
- September 27, 1998, for the Seattle Mariners

MLB statistics
- Win–loss record: 0–0
- Earned run average: 4.05
- Strikeouts: 6
- Stats at Baseball Reference

Teams
- Seattle Mariners (1998)
Medals
Men's baseball
Representing United States
Pan American Games
Silver medal – second place	1999 Winnipeg	Team

David Holdridge (born February 5, 1969) is an American former professional baseball pitcher. He played for the Seattle Mariners of Major League Baseball (MLB). He also played in the California Angels and Philadelphia Phillies organizations.

== Playing career ==
Holdridge was drafted 31st overall in the first round of the 1987 Major League Baseball draft by the California Angels. He had not pitched his senior season at Ocean View High School in Huntington Beach, California, due to a shoulder injury he suffered in a pick-up football game. He returned to the mound in 1988. After that season, the Angels traded Holdridge to the Philadelphia Phillies for Lance Parrish.

On December 9, 1991, Holdridge returned to the Angels organization after being selected from the Phillies in the 1991 Rule 5 draft. He converted from a starting pitcher to a reliever in 1994. He elected free agency after the 1996 season.

On December 13, 1996, Holdridge signed as a free agent with the Seattle Mariners. He made his MLB debut in August 1998, striking out Deivi Cruz before struggling to close out a Seattle win against the Detroit Tigers. He pitched in 7 games for Seattle with a 4.05 ERA in 6 2/3 innings pitched; this would be his only season in the big leagues, though he would pitch in Triple-A in 1999.

Holdridge is married and has a son.
