= Derek Jeter =

American baseball player (born 1974)

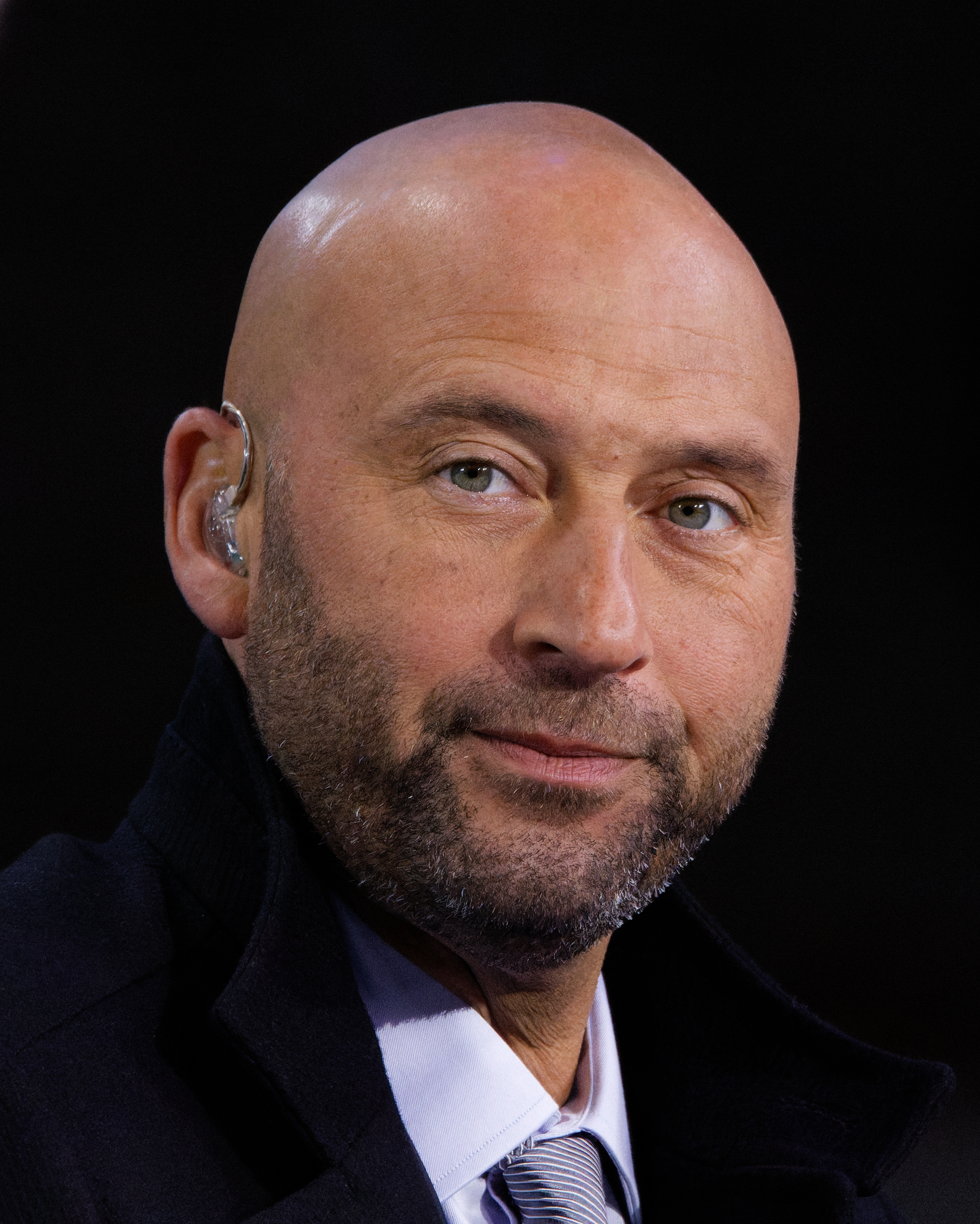
- Jeter in 2024
- Shortstop
- Born: June 26, 1974 (age 52); Pequannock Township, New Jersey, U.S.
- Batted: Right Threw: Right

MLB debut
- May 29, 1995, for the New York Yankees

Last MLB appearance
- September 28, 2014, for the New York Yankees

MLB statistics
- Batting average: .310
- Hits: 3,465
- Home runs: 260
- Runs batted in: 1,311
- Stats at Baseball Reference

Teams
- New York Yankees (1995–2014)

Career highlights and awards
- 14× All-Star (1998–2002, 2004, 2006–2012, 2014); 5× World Series champion (1996, 1998–2000, 2009); World Series MVP (2000); AL Rookie of the Year (1996); 5× Gold Glove Award (2004–2006, 2009, 2010); 5× Silver Slugger Award (2006–2009, 2012); 2× AL Hank Aaron Award (2006, 2009); Roberto Clemente Award (2009); Commissioner's Historic Achievement Award; New York Yankees No. 2 retired; Monument Park honoree

Member of the National

Baseball Hall of Fame
- Induction: 2020
- Vote: 99.7% (first ballot)

Derek Sanderson Jeter (/ˈdʒiːtər/ JEE-tər; born June 26, 1974), nicknamed "the Captain", is an American former professional baseball player, businessman, and baseball executive. A shortstop, Jeter spent his entire 20-year Major League Baseball (MLB) career with the New York Yankees. He was elected to the Baseball Hall of Fame in his first year of eligibility in 2020; he received 396 of 397 possible votes, the second-highest percentage in MLB history (behind only teammate Mariano Rivera) and the highest by a position player (both records since tied by Ichiro Suzuki). He was the chief executive officer (CEO) and part owner of the league's Miami Marlins from September 2017 to February 2022.

A five-time World Series champion with the Yankees, Jeter is regarded as a central contributor to the franchise's dynasty during the late 1990s and early 2000s for his hitting, base-running, fielding, and leadership. He is the Yankees' all-time career leader in hits (3,465), doubles (544), games played (2,747), stolen bases (358), times on base (4,716), plate appearances (12,602) and at bats (11,195). His accolades include 14 All-Star selections, five Gold Glove Awards, five Silver Slugger Awards, two Hank Aaron Awards, and a 2009 Roberto Clemente Award. Jeter was the 28th player to reach 3,000 hits and finished his career sixth in MLB history in career hits (3,465), second all-time among right-handed hitters behind Hank Aaron, and first among shortstops. In 2017, the Yankees retired his uniform number 2.

The Yankees drafted Jeter out of high school in 1992, and he debuted in the major leagues at age 20 in 1995. The following year, he became the Yankees' starting shortstop, won the Rookie of the Year Award, and helped the team win the 1996 World Series over the Atlanta Braves. Jeter continued to excel during the team's championship seasons of 1998–2000; he finished third in voting for the American League (AL) Most Valuable Player (MVP) Award in 1998, recorded multiple career-high numbers in 1999, and won both the All-Star Game MVP and World Series MVP Awards in 2000. He consistently placed among the AL leaders in hits and runs scored for most of his career, and served as the Yankees' team captain from 2003 until his retirement in 2014. Throughout his career, Jeter contributed reliably to the Yankees' franchise successes. He holds many postseason records, and has a .321 batting average in the World Series. Jeter has earned the nicknames "Captain Clutch" and "Mr. November" due to his outstanding play in the postseason.

Jeter is one of the most heavily marketed athletes of his generation and is involved in numerous product endorsements. His personal life and relationships with other celebrities have drawn the attention of the media.

== Early life and education ==
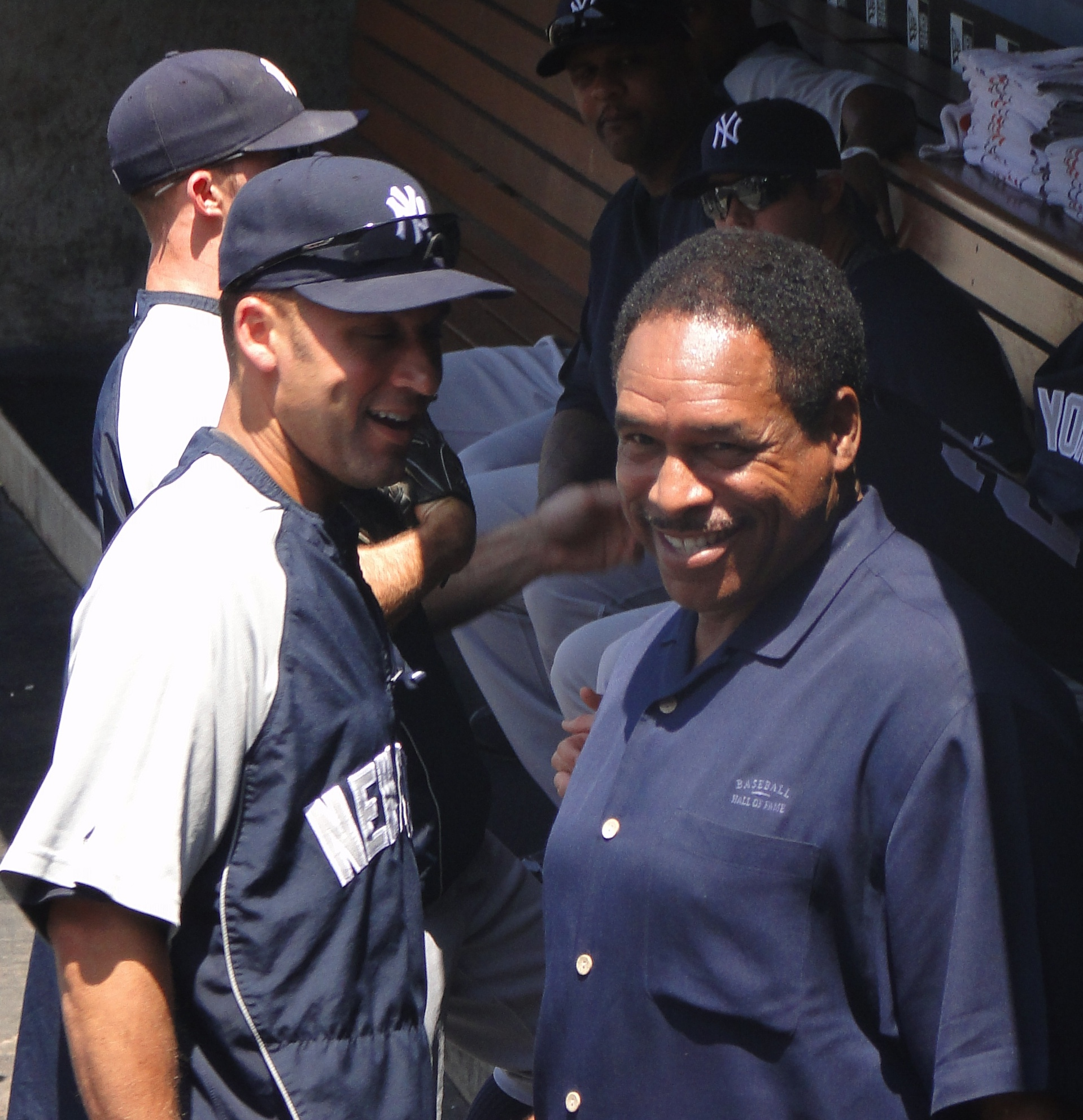
Jeter with his boyhood idol Dave Winfield at Dodger Stadium, June 2010

Derek Sanderson Jeter was born on June 26, 1974, in Pequannock Township, New Jersey, the son of accountant Dorothy (née Connors) and substance abuse counselor Sanderson Charles Jeter. His mother is of German and Irish ancestry, while his father is African-American. They met while serving in the United States Army in Germany. His father played baseball at Fisk University in Tennessee as a shortstop, and holds a PhD. When Jeter was a child, his parents made him sign a contract every year that defined acceptable and unacceptable forms of behavior. Dorothy instilled a positive attitude in her son, insisting that he not use the word "can't." It was a baseball family, and Jeter's younger sister Sharlee (born c. 1979) was a softball star in high school.

The Jeters lived in New Jersey until Derek was four, at which point they moved to Kalamazoo, Michigan. At age five, Jeter began playing little league baseball. The children lived with their parents during the school year and spent their summers with their grandparents in West Milford, New Jersey. Attending New York Yankees games with his grandparents, Jeter became a passionate fan of the team. Watching star outfielder Dave Winfield inspired him to pursue a career in baseball.

Jeter attended Kalamazoo Central High School, where he ran cross country in the fall, played basketball in the winter and baseball in the spring. Jeter posted high batting averages for the school's baseball team; he batted .557 in his sophomore year and .508 as a junior. In his senior year, he batted .508 and compiled 23 runs batted in (RBIs), 21 walks, four home runs, a .637 on-base percentage (OBP), a .831 slugging percentage (SLG), 12 stolen bases (in 12 attempts), and only one strikeout.

Jeter received several honors after his senior season, including the Kalamazoo Area B'nai B'rith Award for Scholar Athlete, the 1992 High School Player of the Year Award from the American Baseball Coaches Association, the 1992 Gatorade High School Player of the year award, and USA Today's High School Player of the Year. He also received an All-State honorable mention in basketball. Jeter earned a baseball scholarship to attend the University of Michigan and play college baseball for the Michigan Wolverines. Jeter enrolled at the University of Michigan as an undergraduate student in fall 1992, but left in 1993 after he was drafted by the New York Yankees.

Jeter received an honorary Doctor of Laws degree from the University of Michigan and gave a speech at the university's 2025 spring commencement.

== Professional career ==
=== Draft ===
The Houston Astros held the first overall pick in the 1992 MLB draft. Hall of Fame pitcher Hal Newhouser, who worked for the Astros as a scout, evaluated Jeter extensively and lobbied team management to select him. Fearing Jeter would insist on a salary bonus of at least $1 million to forgo college for a professional contract, they chose Cal State Fullerton outfielder Phil Nevin, who signed for $700,000. Newhouser felt so strongly about Jeter's potential that he quit his job with the Astros in protest after they ignored his drafting advice.

The Yankees, who selected sixth, also rated Jeter highly. Yankees scout Dick Groch, assigned to scout in the Midwest, watched Jeter participate in an all-star camp held at Western Michigan University. Though Yankees officials were concerned that Jeter would attend college instead of signing a professional contract, Groch convinced them to select him, saying, "the only place Derek Jeter's going is to Cooperstown." The second through fifth picks were Paul Shuey, B. J. Wallace, Jeffrey Hammonds, and Chad Mottola; those five would combine for two All-Star Game appearances (Nevin and Hammonds). The Yankees drafted Jeter, who chose to turn pro, signing for $800,000.

=== Minor leagues ===
Jeter played four seasons in Minor League Baseball, formally known as the National Association of Professional Baseball Leagues (NAPBL). He began the 1992 season with the Gulf Coast Yankees of the Rookie-level Gulf Coast League, based in Tampa, Florida. In his first professional game, he failed to get a hit in seven at-bats, going 0-for-7, while striking out five times. Jeter continued to struggle during the rest of the season, batting .202 in 47 games. Manager Gary Denbo benched him in the season's final game to ensure his average would not drop below .200, known in baseball as the Mendoza Line. Homesick and frustrated by his lack of success, he accrued $400-per-month phone bills from daily calls to his parents.

The Yankees promoted Jeter to the Greensboro Hornets of the Class A South Atlantic League (SAL) to give him more at-bats. He batted .247 in his first 11 games with Greensboro, and struggled defensively, making nine errors in 48 chances. Weighing 156 pounds (71 kg), Jeter had a scrawny appearance that did not match his reputation as the Yankees' future leader. Jorge Posada and Andy Pettitte, who played for the Hornets that season, at first questioned the hype surrounding Jeter, but recognized his talent and poise.

Jeter focused the next offseason on his fielding. Baseball America rated him among the top 100 prospects in baseball before the 1993 season, ranking him 44th. Returning to the Hornets in 1993, his first full season of professional baseball, Jeter hit .295 with five home runs, 71 RBIs, and 18 stolen bases; SAL managers voted him the "Most Outstanding Major League Prospect" in the league. He finished second in the SAL in triples (11), third in hits (152), and 11th in batting average, and was named to the postseason All-Star team. he committed 56 errors, a SAL record. Despite this, he was named the SAL's Best Defensive Shortstop, Most Exciting Player, and Best Infield Arm by Baseball America.

Coming off his strong 1993 season, Baseball America rated Jeter as the 16th-best prospect in baseball. He played for the Tampa Yankees of the Class A-Advanced Florida State League (FSL), the Albany-Colonie Yankees of the Class AA Eastern League, and the Columbus Clippers of the Class AAA International League during the 1994 season, combining to hit .344 with five home runs, 68 RBIs, and steal 50 bases across the three levels. He was honored with Minor League Player of the Year Awards by Baseball America, The Sporting News, and Topps/NAPBL. He was also named the most valuable player of the FSL.

Considered the fourth-best prospect in baseball by Baseball America heading into the 1995 season, Jeter was projected as the starting shortstop for the Yankees. However, he suffered mild inflammation in his right shoulder in the Arizona Fall League after the conclusion of the 1994 regular season. As a precaution, the Yankees signed Tony Fernández to a two-year contract. With Fernández the starting shortstop, the Yankees assigned Jeter to Class AAA. During the 1994–95 Major League Baseball strike, Gene Michael, the Yankees' general manager, offered Jeter the opportunity to work out for the MLB team with replacement players in spring training before the 1995 season. Jeter denied receiving the offer, and he did not cross the picket line.

=== New York Yankees (1995–2014) ===
==== 1995–1998 ====
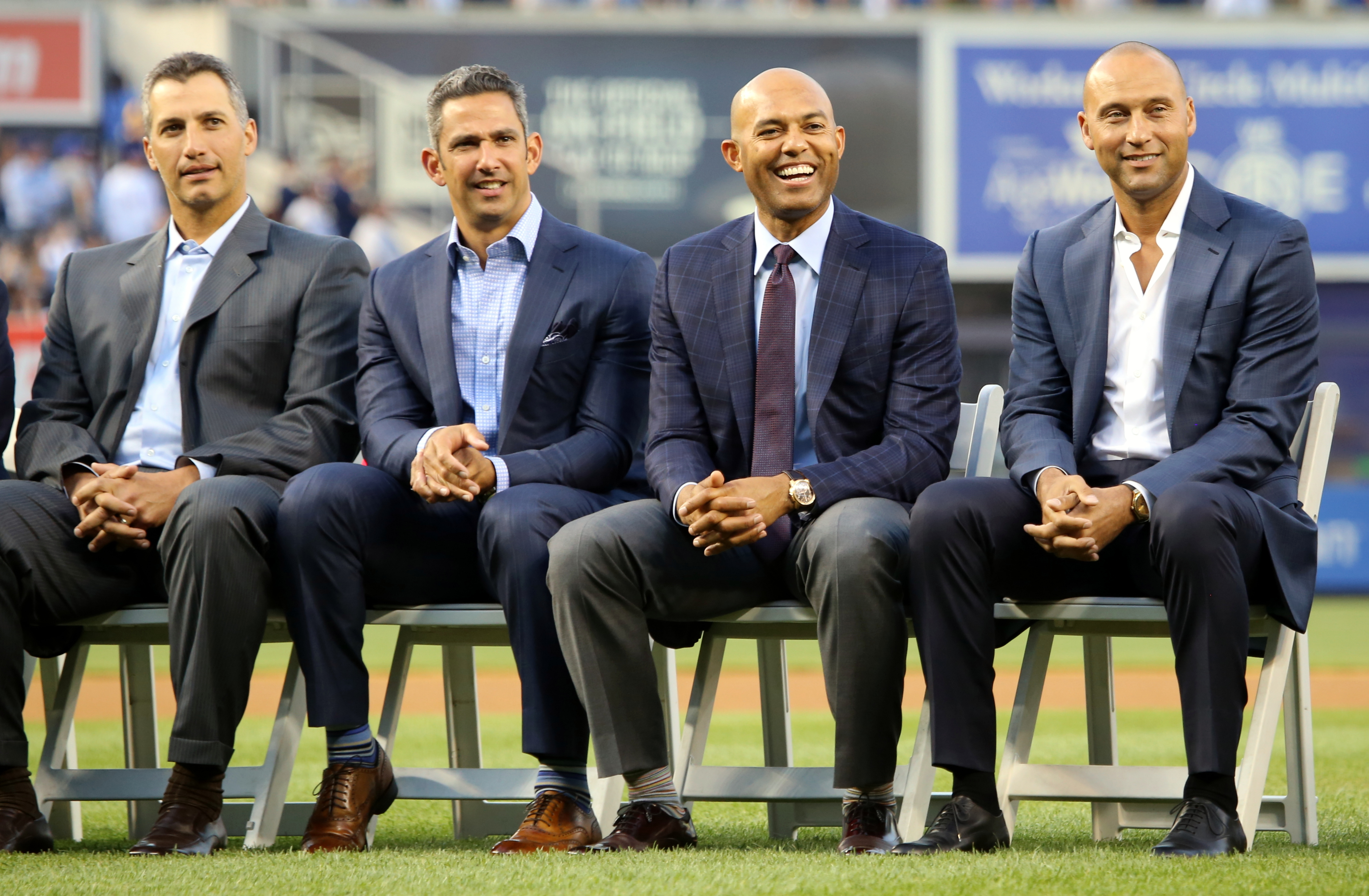
Jeter (right) with his fellow Core Four teammates in 2015. All four made their major-league debuts for the Yankees in 1995.

Early in the 1995 season, Fernández and infielder Pat Kelly were injured. Consequently, Jeter made his MLB debut on May 29, 1995. He was assigned uniform number 2, which was most recently worn by Mike Gallego from 1992 to 1994. Batting ninth, he went hitless in five at bats, striking out once. The following day, he recorded his first two major league hits and scored his first two career runs. Jeter batted .234 and committed two errors in 13 games before being returned to Class AAA Columbus; Fernández replaced Jeter at shortstop. He finished the 1995 season with a .250 average without a home run in 15 games in the major leagues. The Yankees advanced to the postseason in 1995. Jeter traveled with the team during the 1995 American League Division Series (ALDS), though he was not on the active roster. The Yankees lost to the Seattle Mariners.

After Fernández batted a disappointing .245 and appeared in only 108 games due to injuries in 1995, newly hired Yankees manager Joe Torre turned to Jeter for the 1996 season, hoping for a .250 batting average and dependable defense. Yankees owner George Steinbrenner, often skeptical of younger players, was unconvinced. After Clyde King, a close Steinbrenner advisor, observed Jeter for two days in spring training in 1996, he came away with the impression that Jeter was not yet ready to contribute at the major league level. To provide depth to the team at the shortstop position after an injury to Fernández, Steinbrenner approved a trade that would have sent pitcher Mariano Rivera to the Mariners for shortstop Félix Fermín, but Michael, by then the vice president of scouting, and assistant general manager Brian Cashman convinced Steinbrenner to give Jeter an opportunity.

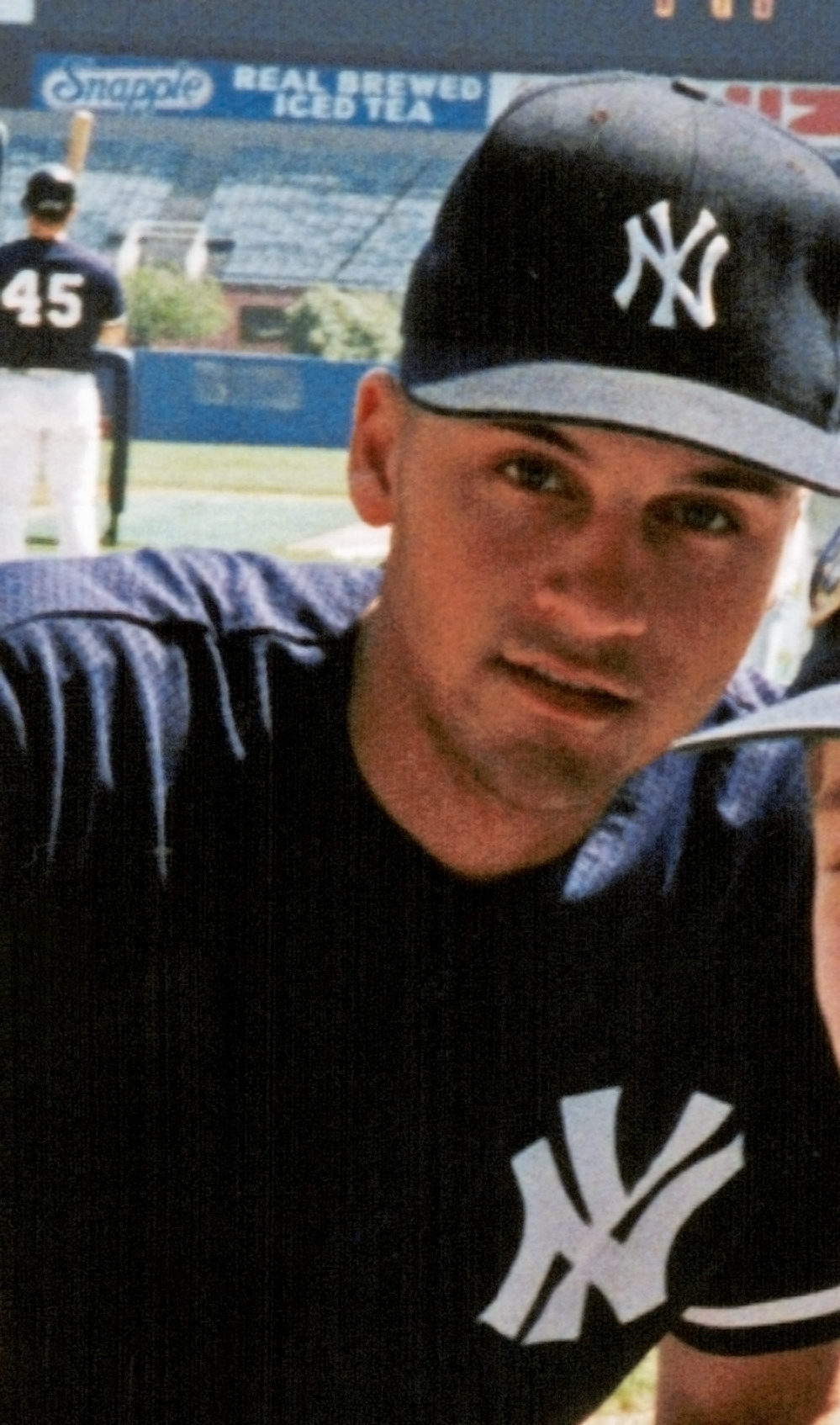
Jeter during his rookie season in May 1996

Rated the sixth-best prospect in baseball by Baseball America heading into the 1996 season, Jeter started on Opening Day, the first Yankee rookie to start as shortstop for the team since Tom Tresh in 1962. (Note: Though Jeter debuted with the Yankees in 1995, he qualified as a rookie in 1996, as he had fewer than 130 at-bats during the 1995 season.) He hit his first MLB home run that day. With his speed and ability to execute the hit and run, Jeter served as a complement to leadoff hitter Tim Raines while batting in the ninth spot in the batting order. By year's end, Jeter batted .314 with 10 home runs, 104 runs scored, and 78 RBIs. He was named the unanimous AL Rookie of the Year, receiving all 28 first-place votes in only the fifth sweep in the honor's 50-year history. (Note: As first-place votes are worth five points, second-place votes are worth three points, and third-place votes are worth one point, Jeter won the balloting with 140 points, ahead of James Baldwin (64 points), Tony Clark (30 points), Rocky Coppinger (6 points) and José Rosado (6 points).)

The Yankees reached the 1996 postseason, and Torre batted Jeter in the leadoff spot based on his strong year-long performance. During Game 1 of the 1996 American League Championship Series (ALCS), the Yankees trailed the Baltimore Orioles 4–3 in the eighth inning when Jeter hit a fly ball to right field that was ruled a home run by the umpires after 12-year-old fan Jeffrey Maier reached over the wall to catch the ball. Though the ball would have remained in play if not for Maier, and could have been caught by Tony Tarasco, the home run stood as called, tying the game. It marked the first home run of Jeter's postseason career. The Yankees won the game and defeated the Orioles in five games. Overall, Jeter batted .361 in the 1996 postseason, helping to lead the Yankees offensively with Bernie Williams, as Wade Boggs, Paul O'Neill, and Tino Martinez struggled. The Yankees defeated the Atlanta Braves in the 1996 World Series to win their first championship since the 1978 World Series.

Following his Rookie of the Year season, Jeter was considered to be among a "new crop" of MLB shortstops on the rise, along with Alex Rodriguez and Nomar Garciaparra, as the careers of older shortstops such as Cal Ripken Jr., Barry Larkin, Ozzie Smith, and Alan Trammell were concluding. Rodriguez, the first overall selection in the 1993 MLB draft, first contacted Jeter about his experiences as a high first-round pick. The two became friends to the extent that The New York Times journalist Jack Curry commented "[r]arely have two higher-profile opponents been as close." Rodriguez described Jeter as being "like my brother," even though they were on-field adversaries.

Before the 1997 season, Jeter and the Yankees agreed on a $540,000 contract with performance bonuses. Becoming the Yankees' leadoff batter, Jeter batted .291, with 10 home runs, 70 RBIs, 116 runs, and 190 hits. Though he hit two home runs during the 1997 American League Division Series, the Yankees lost to the Cleveland Indians, three games to two.

Jeter earned $750,000 for the 1998 season. That year, he was selected for his first All-Star Game. In the regular season, he batted .324 with a league-leading 127 runs, 19 home runs, and 84 RBIs, for a team that won 114 games during the regular season and is widely considered to be one of the greatest of all time. In the playoffs, Jeter hit only .176 in the 1998 ALDS and ALCS, but batted .353 in the World Series, as the Yankees defeated the San Diego Padres in four games. At season's end, Jeter finished third in voting for the AL Most Valuable Player (MVP) Award.

==== 1999–2002 ====
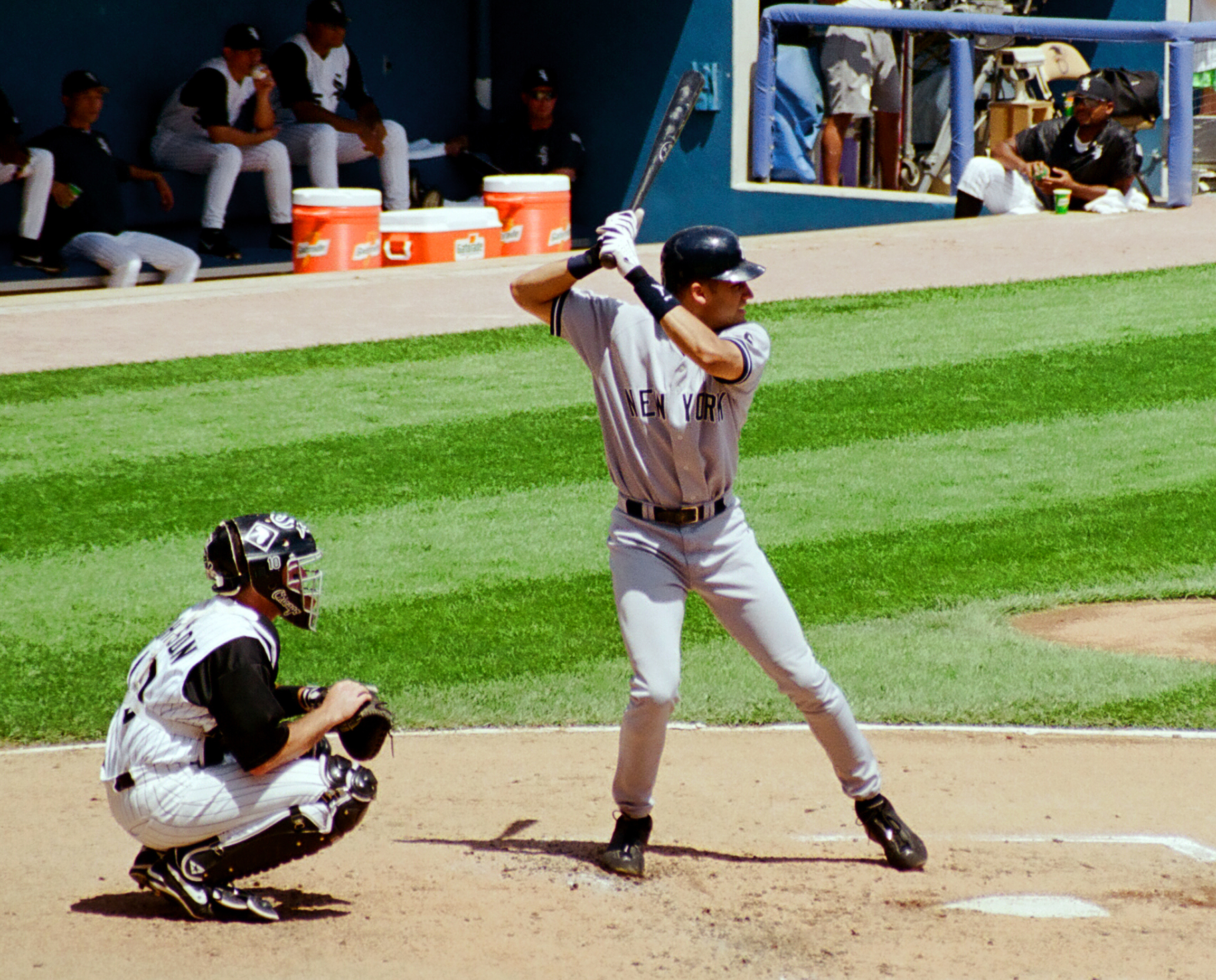
Jeter in his distinctive early career upright batting stance at the new Comiskey Park, 1999

Eligible for salary arbitration for the first time before the 1999 season, Jeter was awarded a $5 million salary. He led the AL in hits that season with 219, while finishing second in the league in batting average (.349) and runs scored (134), appearing in his second All-Star game that year. His season totals in batting average, runs, hits, runs batted in, doubles (37), triples (9), home runs (24), SLG (.552), and OBP (.438) are all personal bests. He also drove in 102 runs. In the postseason, Jeter batted .455 in the ALDS, .350 in the ALCS, and .353 in the World Series, as the Yankees defeated the Braves to win another championship.

During the 1999–2000 offseason, the Yankees negotiated with Jeter, tentatively agreeing to a seven-year, $118.5 million contract. However, because Steinbrenner did not want to set a record for the largest contract, the Yankees waited while Juan González and the Detroit Tigers negotiated on a reported eight-year, $143 million contract extension. When that agreement fell through, so did Jeter's tentative deal. To avoid arbitration, Jeter and the Yankees agreed to a one-year deal worth $10 million.

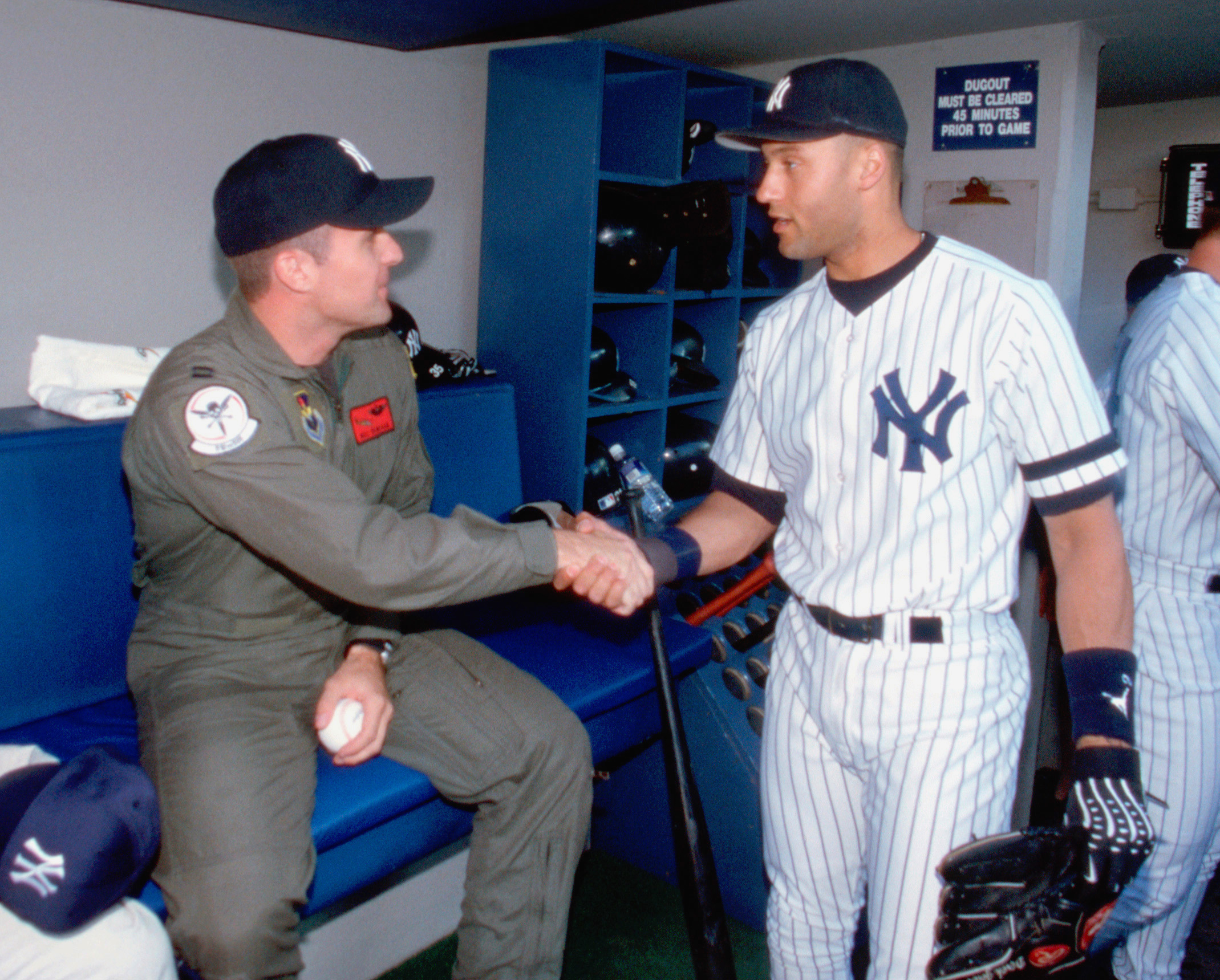
Jeter meets United States Air Force pilot Capt. Bill Denehen in May 2000

Jeter batted a team-best .339 in the 2000 regular season and added 15 home runs, 73 RBIs, 119 runs scored, and 22 stolen bases. In the 2000 MLB All-Star Game, he recorded three hits, including a two-run single that gave his team the lead and victory. The performance earned him the All-Star Game MVP Award, the first time a Yankee won the award. During the postseason, he batted only .211 in the ALDS against the Oakland Athletics, but rebounded to hit .318 in the Championship Series against the Seattle Mariners, and .409 in the World Series against the New York Mets. Jeter added two home runs, a triple, and two doubles in the World Series, including a leadoff home run on the first pitch of Game 4 and a triple later in the third inning. His home run in Game 5 tied the game and extended his World Series hitting streak to 14 games. The Yankees defeated the Mets in five games for their third consecutive title and fourth in Jeter's first five full seasons. Jeter won the World Series MVP Award, becoming the first (and so far only) player to win the All-Star Game MVP and World Series MVP Awards in the same season.

With one year remaining until he would become eligible for free agency, Jeter signed a ten-year, $189 million contract before the 2001 season to remain with the Yankees. Alex Rodriguez had signed a ten-year, $252 million contract with the Texas Rangers earlier in the offseason, setting the market for Jeter's negotiations. Jeter became the second-highest-paid athlete across all team sports and auto racing, trailing only Rodriguez. The $18.9 million average annual value of Jeter's contract was the third-highest in baseball, behind only Rodriguez ($25.2 million) and Manny Ramirez ($20 million).

In 2001, Jeter batted .311 with 21 home runs, 74 RBIs, 110 runs scored, and 27 stolen bases. He played in the 2001 MLB All-Star Game, hitting a home run off of Jon Lieber in his only at bat. Jeter made a defensive assist in Game 3 of the ALDS against the Athletics. With Jeremy Giambi on first base, Oakland right fielder Terrence Long hit a double off Yankees pitcher Mike Mussina into the right-field corner. As Giambi rounded third base and headed for home plate, Yankees right fielder Shane Spencer retrieved the ball and made a wild throw that missed cut-off man Tino Martinez and dribbled down the first-base line. Jeter ran from shortstop to grab the ball and flipped it backhanded to catcher Jorge Posada, rather than throwing it overhand. Posada tagged Giambi out on the leg just before he crossed home plate, preserving the Yankees' one-run lead. Facing elimination, the Yankees eventually won the game, as well as the series. The play, known as "The Flip", was later voted seventh in Baseball Weekly's 10 Most Amazing Plays of all time, and won the 2002 Best Play ESPY Award.

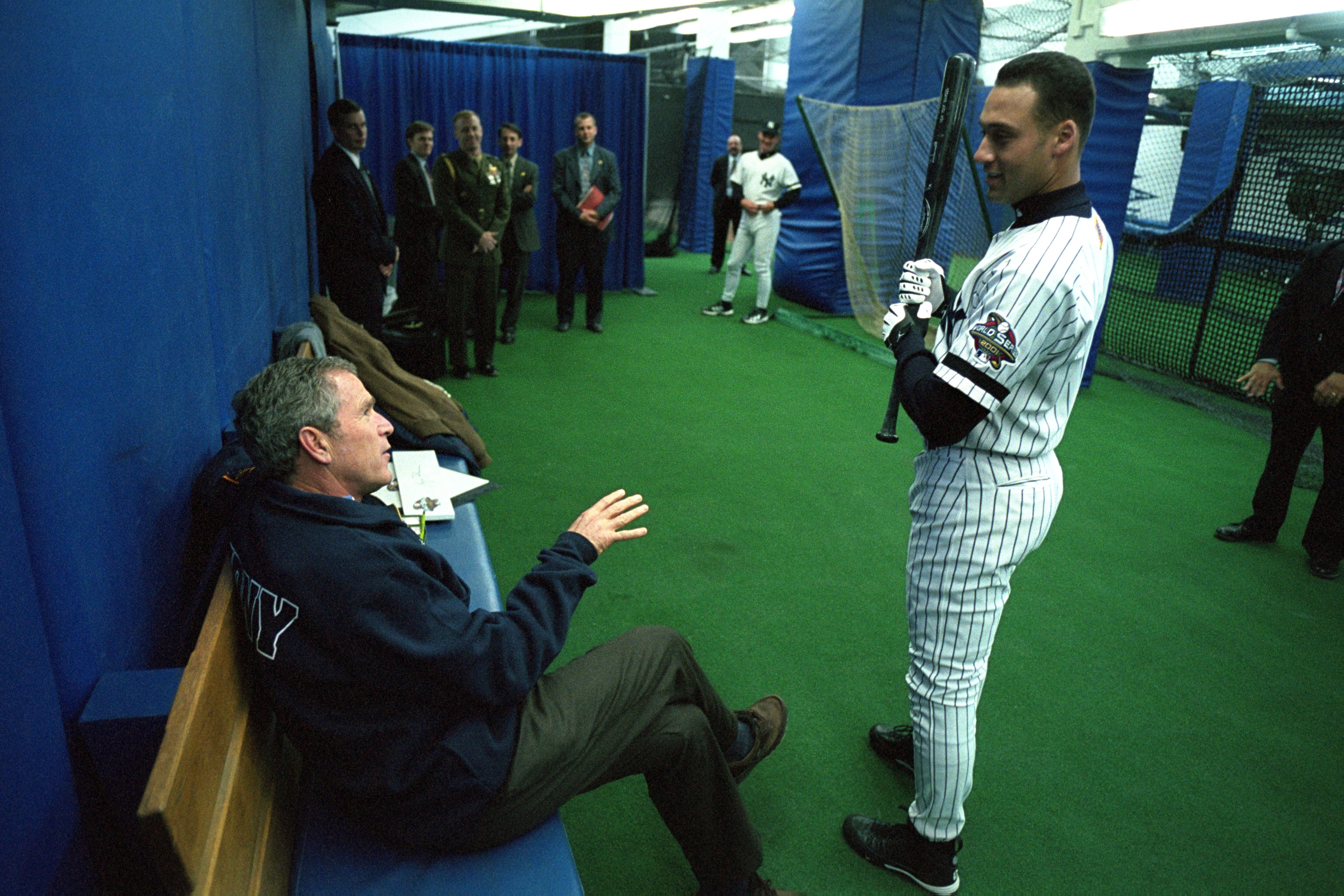
Jeter chats with President George W. Bush before Game 3 of the 2001 World Series

As a result of the September 11 attacks, the start of the playoffs was delayed and the season's end was extended past the usual October timeframe. The Yankees advanced to the 2001 World Series to face the Arizona Diamondbacks. Game 4 marked the first time that any non-exhibition MLB game had been played in the month of November. In extra innings, Jeter hit a game-winning home run off of Byung-hyun Kim. The words "Mr. November" flashed on the scoreboard, alluding to former Yankee Reggie Jackson's nickname, "Mr. October". Despite the home run, Jeter slumped at the plate; he denied injuries were a factor, though a fall into a photographer's box trying to catch a foul ball may have aggravated an earlier hamstring injury. Jeter batted .148 in the World Series, as the Yankees lost in seven games.

Jeter batted .297, with 18 home runs, 75 RBIs, 124 runs scored, 191 hits, and a career-best 32 stolen bases during the 2002 regular season. He led the majors in stolen base percentage (91.4%), getting caught only three times. He made his fifth All-Star appearance. In the 2002 postseason, the Anaheim Angels defeated the Yankees in the ALDS on their way to winning the World Series.

==== 2003–2008 ====
On Opening Day of the 2003 season, Jeter dislocated his left shoulder when he collided with Toronto Blue Jays catcher Ken Huckaby at third base. He was placed on the disabled list for six weeks and missed 36 games; he had never played fewer than 148 games in the prior seven full seasons. Jeter returned to bat .324, finishing third in batting average to Bill Mueller, who batted .326. Ramirez finished second.

Steinbrenner named Jeter the captain of the Yankees on June 3, 2003, following eight seasons without a captain after Don Mattingly retired in 1995. That postseason, Jeter batted .314 with two home runs, five RBIs, and 10 runs scored across 17 playoff games, including three hits in Game 3 of the 2003 World Series against the Florida Marlins – the only three hits Josh Beckett allowed during the game. Jeter committed a crucial error in a Game 6 loss, and the Marlins won the series in six games.

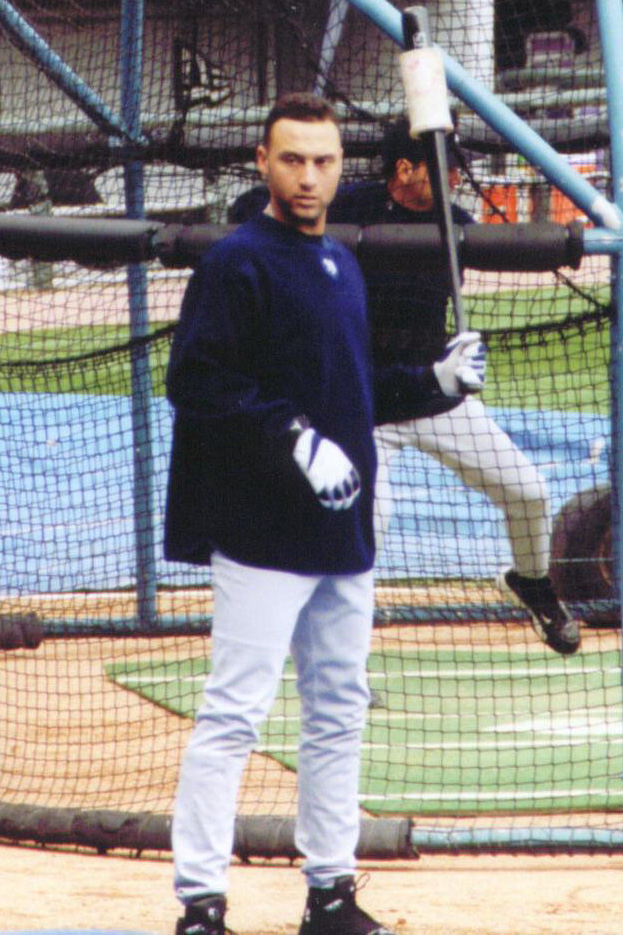
Jeter during batting practice before a game in 2004

The Yankees acquired Rodriguez from the Texas Rangers during the 2003–04 offseason. Rodriguez had won two Gold Glove Awards at shortstop and was considered the best shortstop in baseball. Jeter—who had no Gold Gloves at the time—remained the team's starting shortstop while Rodriguez moved to third base. Rodriguez's fielding range allowed Jeter to cede ground to his right to Rodriguez and cheat to his left: fielding balls hit to his left is a weakness identified by scouts. The 2004 season began with Jeter mired in a slump, at one point getting only one hit in a span of 36 at-bats; through April, he batted .168. His batting average improved to .277 by the All-Star break in July.

Jeter made the All-Star team and finished the season with a .292 average; 23 home runs, the second-most of his career; 78 RBIs; 111 runs scored; and a career-best 44 doubles. He batted .316 with a team-leading four RBIs as the Yankees defeated the Minnesota Twins in the 2004 ALDS. Jeter struggled in the 2004 ALCS, batting .200 with one extra base hit, as the Yankees lost the series to the Red Sox in seven games, despite winning the first three games.

In the 12th inning of a tied game on July 1, 2004, against their rivals, the Boston Red Sox, Trot Nixon hit a pop fly down the left field line. Jeter ran from his position at shortstop and made an over-the-shoulder catch. He launched himself over the third-base side railing and two rows of seats, receiving a lacerated chin and bruised face. The Yankees went on to win the game in the bottom of the 13th inning. This was voted the Play of the Year in the This Year in Baseball Awards competition, as voted on by fans at MLB.com. Following the 2004 season, Jeter was presented with his first Gold Glove Award; his diving catch on July 1 was cited as a reason for the award. Though Jeter was fourth among shortstops in fielding percentage and errors, two traditional fielding statistics, critics pointed to his lower ratings in the more advanced sabermetric statistics, such as range factor and ultimate zone rating (UZR).

Jeter was second in the AL in runs scored (122) in the 2005 season, and was third in the league in both at bats (654) and hits (202). Though his critics continued to see Jeter as a liability defensively, he won his second consecutive Gold Glove in 2005. Orlando Cabrera of the Angels had a higher fielding percentage and committed fewer errors, but voters noted that Jeter had more assists. Though Jeter batted .333 during the 2005 ALDS, the Yankees lost to the Angels.

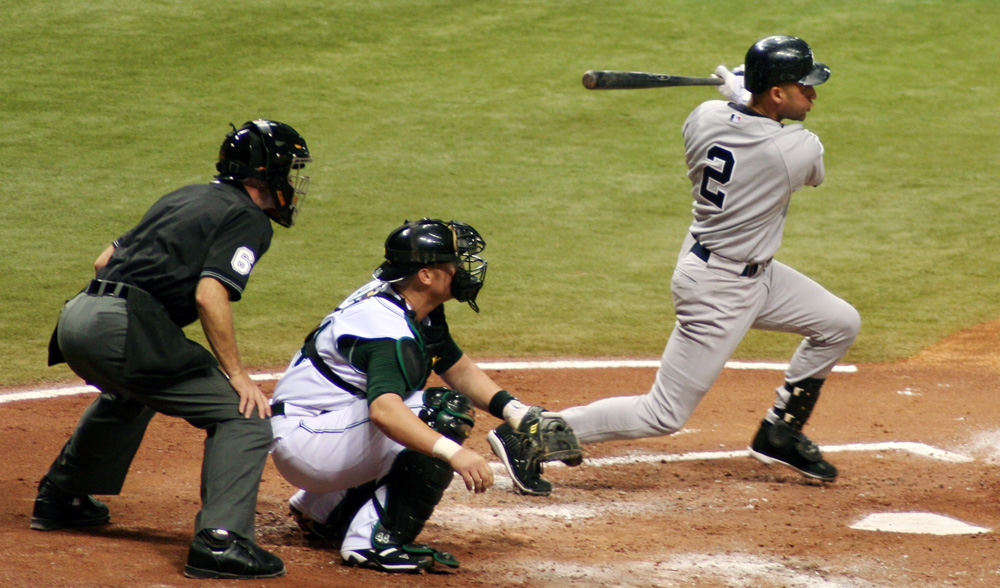
Jeter connects for a hit against the Tampa Bay Devil Rays in 2006

For the 2006 season, the Yankees signed Johnny Damon to play center field and lead off, moving Jeter to the second position in the batting lineup. During the 2006 season, Jeter recorded his 2,000th career hit, becoming the eighth Yankee to reach the milestone. Jeter finished the season second in the AL in both batting average (.343) and runs scored (118), third in hits (214), and fourth in OBP (.417), earning his seventh All-Star selection. Jeter batted .500 with one home run in the 2006 ALDS, including a perfect 5-for-5 performance in Game 1, making him the sixth player to record five hits in one postseason game. The Yankees lost to the Detroit Tigers, three games to one.

Many expected Jeter would win the AL MVP Award for 2006. In a close vote, Jeter finished second in the voting to Justin Morneau of the Twins. (Note: Morneau received 15 of the 28 first-place votes, while Jeter received 12. Morneau won the balloting with 320 points to Jeter's 306 points.) Though he lost the MVP Award, he won the Hank Aaron Award, given for superior offensive performance. He also won his third consecutive Gold Glove Award.

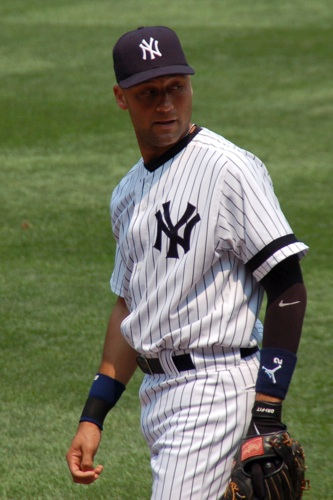
Jeter in 2007

Though the Yankees continued to struggle with postseason failures, Jeter remained a consistent contributor. During the 2007 season, Jeter was third in the AL with 203 hits, his third consecutive season and sixth overall, with at least 200 hits. He also finished ninth in batting average (.322). He was selected for his eighth All-Star appearance. In the field, he was involved in turning a career-high 104 double plays. He struggled during the 2007 ALDS, batting 3-for-17 (.176) with one RBI, as the Indians defeated the Yankees.

Jeter hit his 400th career double on June 27, 2008, and his 200th home run on July 12. Jeter's slugging percentage (SLG) dropped to .410 in the 2008 season, his lowest mark since 1997. Jeter was elected to his ninth All-Star game as the starting shortstop. He finished the season with a .300 batting average.

Jeter tied Lou Gehrig's record for hits at Yankee Stadium (1,269) with a home run off Tampa Bay Rays pitcher David Price on September 14, 2008. On September 16, he broke the record against Chicago White Sox pitcher Gavin Floyd. The Yankees were eliminated from postseason contention, the only full season in Jeter's career where he did not compete in the playoffs. Following the final game in Yankee Stadium history, Jeter made a speech at the request of the Yankees, thanking the Yankees fans for their support—a moment later voted by fans as the Moment of the Year in MLB.com's This Year in Baseball Awards:

From all of us up here, it's a huge honor to put this uniform on every day and come out here and play. Every member of this organization, past and present, has been calling this place home for 85 years. There's a lot of tradition, a lot of history and a lot of memories. The great thing about memories is you're able to pass them along from generation to generation. Although things are going to change next year and we're going to move across the street, there are a few things with the New York Yankees that never change. That's pride, tradition and most of all, we have the greatest fans in the world. We're relying on you to take the memories from this stadium and add them to the new memories we make at the new Yankee Stadium and continue to pass them on from generation to generation. We just want to take this moment to salute you, the greatest fans in the world.

==== 2009–2013 ====
For the 2009 season, Yankees manager Joe Girardi switched Jeter and Damon in the batting order, with Damon moving to second and Jeter to the leadoff role. Jeter batted .334, third-best in the AL, with a .406 OBP, an .871 OPS, 18 home runs, 66 RBIs, 30 stolen bases in 35 attempts, 107 runs scored, 72 walks, and 212 hits (second in MLB). Defensively, Jeter committed a career-low eight errors, and his .986 fielding percentage was his career best. The addition of Gold Glove-winning first baseman Mark Teixeira allowed second baseman Robinson Canó to shift his focus to his right, helping Jeter. During the season, the Sporting News named Jeter eighth on their list of the 50 greatest current players in baseball.

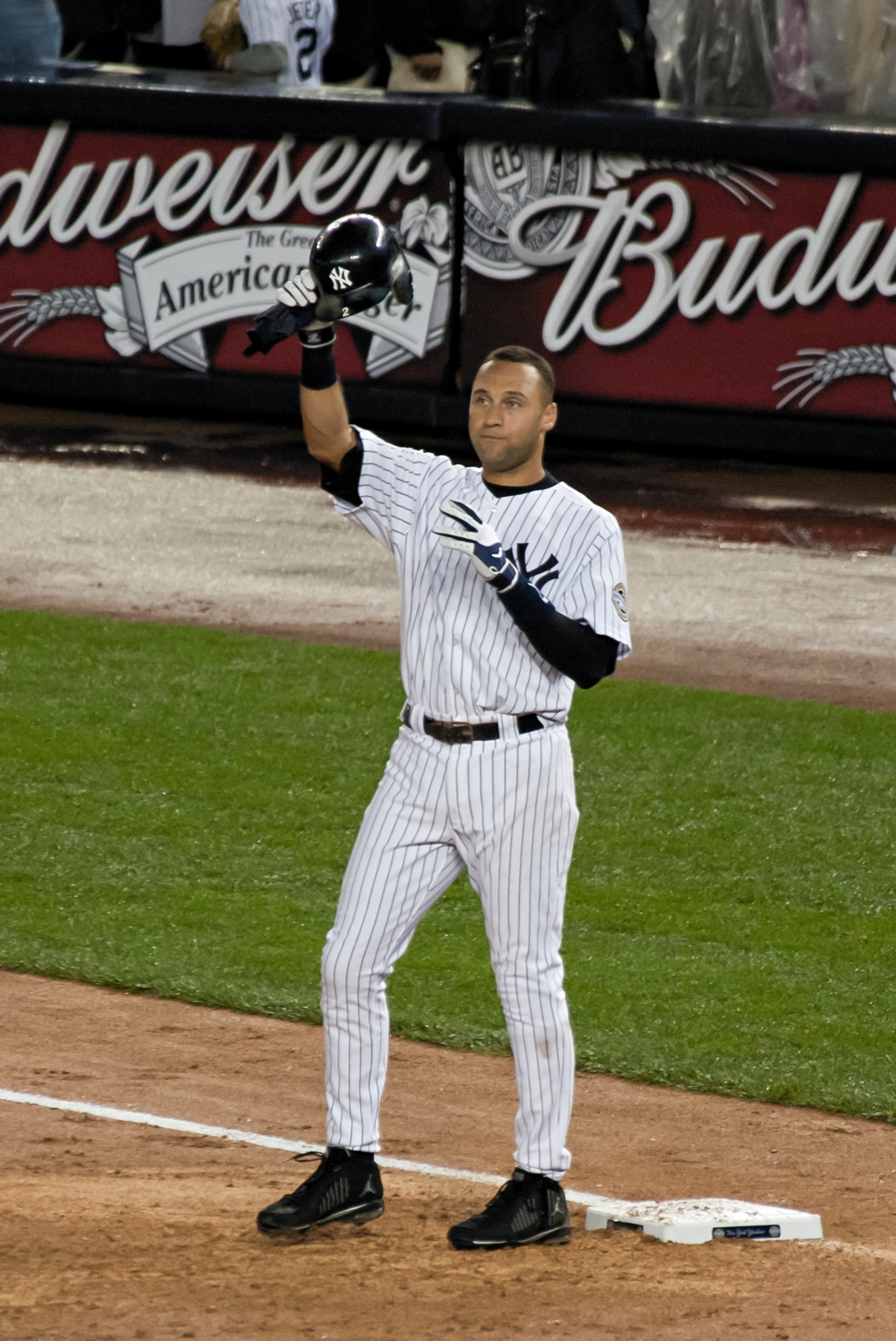
Jeter saluting the crowd after becoming the all-time Yankees hits leader in 2009

Jeter achieved two career hit milestones in the second half of the 2009 season. On August 16, 2009, against the Seattle Mariners, Jeter doubled down the right-field line for his 2,675th hit as a shortstop, breaking Luis Aparicio's previous major league record. Then, Jeter became the all-time hits leader as a member of the Yankees (2,722), passing Lou Gehrig on September 11, 2009. The hit was a single off Baltimore Orioles pitcher Chris Tillman in the third inning.

In the 2009 postseason, Jeter batted .355, including .407 in the 2009 World Series, as he won his fifth World Series championship. He was named Sportsman of the Year for 2009 by Sports Illustrated, and won the Roberto Clemente Award, Hank Aaron Award, his fourth Gold Glove Award and his fourth Silver Slugger Award. Jeter also finished third in the AL MVP voting, behind Minnesota's Joe Mauer and Yankee teammate Mark Teixeira. It was also the fifth championship for Pettitte, Posada, and Rivera, who along with Jeter were referred to as the "Core Four".

In 2010, Jeter, along with Posada and Rivera, became the first trio of teammates in any of the four major league sports in North America (MLB, NFL, NBA, or NHL) to play in at least 16 consecutive seasons on the same team as teammates. The 2010 season was statistically Jeter's worst in many respects. The Yankee captain batted .270 with a .340 OBP and .370 SLG, all career lows, as he hit more ground balls than usual. Despite this, Jeter was elected to start at shortstop in the All-Star Game. He rebounded to bat .342 in his last 79 at-bats after making adjustments to his swing with the help of Kevin Long, the Yankees hitting coach, who had successfully helped Nick Swisher and Curtis Granderson make adjustments that improved their production. With Long, Jeter changed the way he strode with his left leg. Following the season, Jeter won his fifth Gold Glove award. Jeter committed six errors during the season, his lowest total in 15 full seasons.

"He might go down, when it's all over, as the all-time Yankee."

— Don Zimmer, September 13, 2009

After the 2010 season, Jeter became a free agent for the first time in his career. At age 36, Jeter appeared to be in decline; Joe Sheehan of Baseball Prospectus suggested that Jeter, once a "good, not great" shortstop, had declined to become "below average" defensively, to the extent that he would likely need to change positions; Cashman later acknowledged that Jeter might need to shift to the outfield. Though Jeter stated that he wanted to remain with the Yankees, negotiations became tense. Jeter's agent, Casey Close, stated that he was "baffled" by the Yankees' approach to the negotiations, and Cashman, now the team's general manager, responded publicly that Jeter should test the open market to ascertain his value, which angered Jeter. According to reports, Jeter initially sought a four-year contract worth between $23 million and $25 million per season. He reached an agreement with the Yankees on a three-year contract for $51 million with an option for a fourth year. He spent the offseason working with Long on adjustments to his swing.

The adjustments left Jeter frustrated, as he batted .242 in the first month of the 2011 season. As he struggled, it appeared that the 2011 season was the continuation of Jeter's decline. Jeter broke Rickey Henderson's franchise record for stolen bases when he stole his 327th base against the Mariners on May 28, 2011. He suffered a calf injury on June 13 that required his fifth stint on the 15-day disabled list, and his first since 2003. At that point, he was batting .260 for the 2011 season with a .649 OPS. Rehabilitating from his injury in Tampa, Jeter worked on his swing with Denbo, his former minor league manager. With Denbo, Jeter returned to the mechanics he used in his minor league days. Following his activation from the disabled list, he hit .326 with an .806 OPS in his last 64 games of the season. Jeter finished the year with a .297 batting average, six home runs, 61 runs batted in, 84 runs, and 16 stolen bases. He credited the turnaround to his work with Denbo; Long acknowledged that his attempt to adjust Jeter's swing did not work.

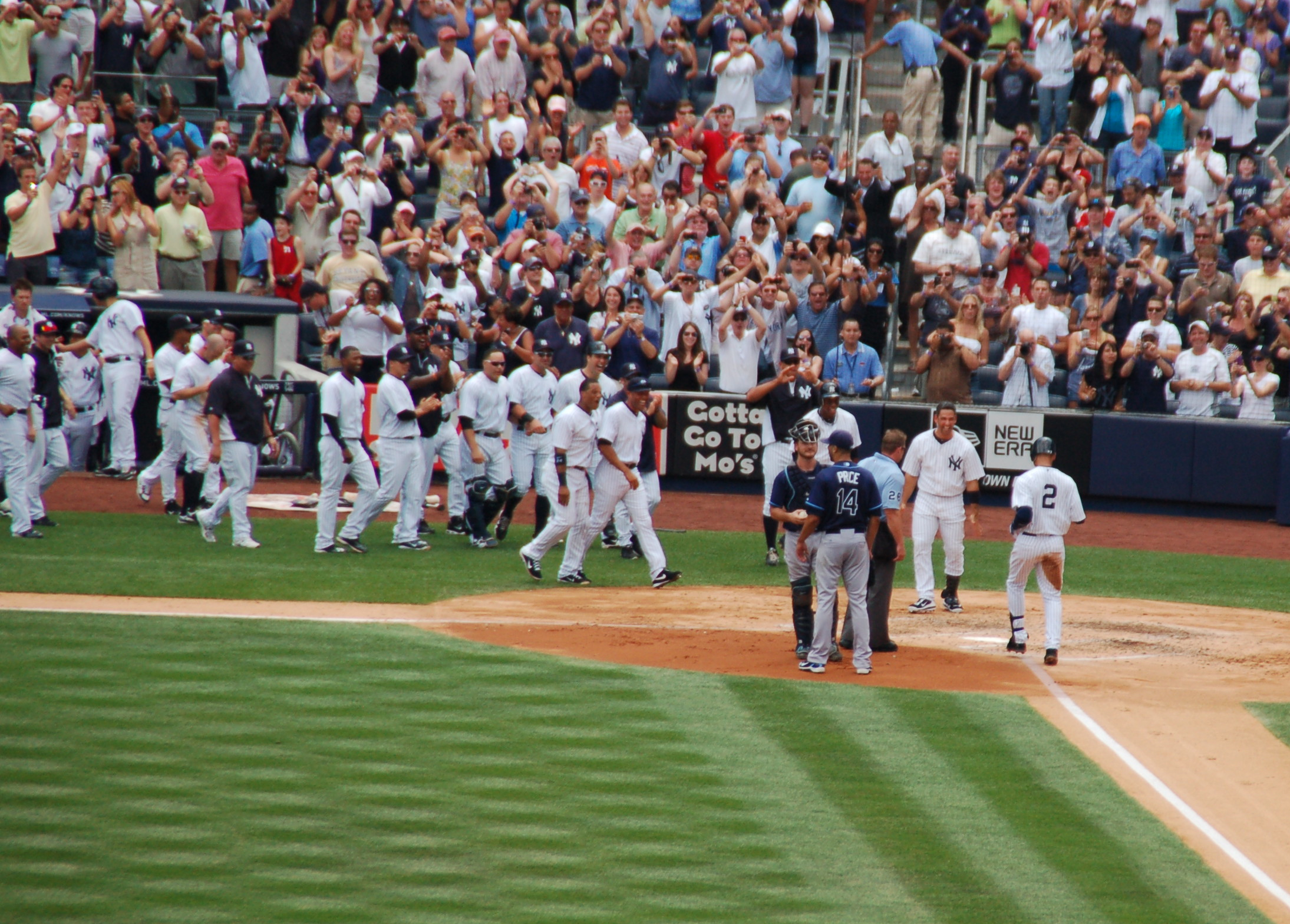
Jeter crosses home plate after recording his 3,000th hit in 2011, his teammates waiting to congratulate him

On July 9, 2011, Jeter recorded his 3,000th career hit, a home run off of David Price of the Tampa Bay Rays. Jeter finished the day with five hits in five at-bats, the second player to have five hits on the day he achieved his 3,000th hit (the first was Craig Biggio). He also became the second player to hit a home run for his 3,000th hit, Wade Boggs (who was teammates with Jeter on the Yankees from 1995 to 1997) having done so in 1999. The last of Jeter's five hits proved to be the game-winning hit. He is the only member of the 3,000 hit club to record all of his hits with the New York Yankees. Jeter joined Honus Wagner as only the second regular shortstop to reach the 3,000 hit plateau. (Note: Though Honus Wagner was primarily a shortstop, he also played other infield positions as well as the outfield. Cal Ripken Jr. reached 3,000 after he had moved to third base. Robin Yount reached the milestone after moving to center field, where he spent almost half his career. Some consider Jeter the third regular shortstop to reach 3,000 along with Wagner and Ripken.) Only Ty Cobb, Hank Aaron, and Robin Yount were younger than Jeter on the day of their 3,000th hit. MLB and HBO produced Derek Jeter 3K, a documentary that profiled his path to 3,000 hits and originally aired on July 28, 2011.

Fatigued from the stress of chasing 3,000 career hits and wanting to rest his calf, Jeter opted not to attend the 2011 MLB All-Star Game. Jeter and Posada played their 1,660th game together on July 14, 2011, breaking the previous franchise record of 1,659 by Gehrig and Tony Lazzeri. Jeter played his 2,402nd game with the Yankees on August 29, 2011, breaking Mickey Mantle's record for most games played as a Yankee. He finished the 2011 season with 162 hits, his 16th consecutive season with 150 hits, which tied him with Pete Rose for the second-most consecutive 150-hit seasons, one behind Hank Aaron for the MLB record. Jeter was honored with the Lou Gehrig Memorial Award, given in recognition of charitable endeavors.

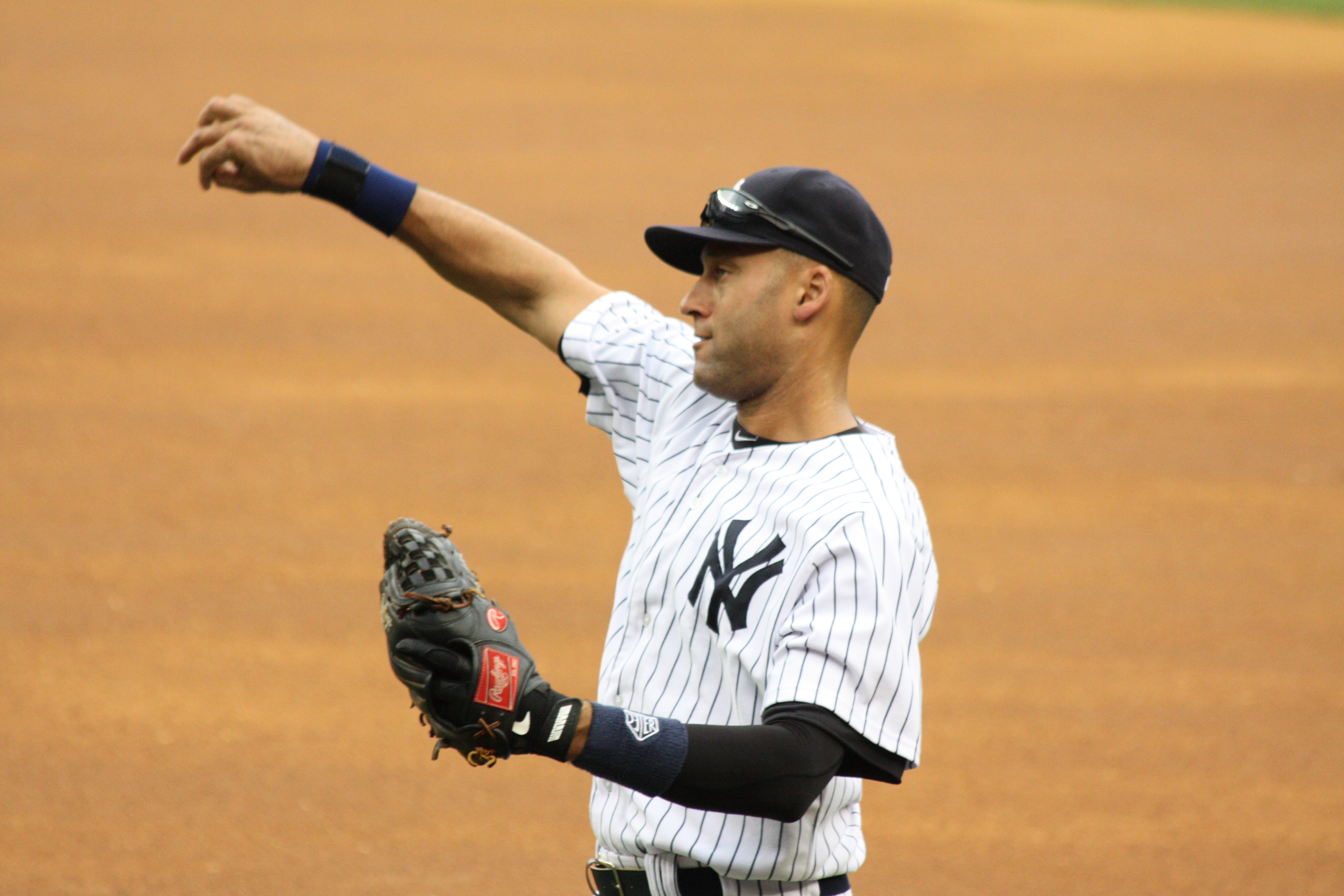
Jeter making warmup tosses in August 2012

Despite continuing concerns about his age, the beginning of the 2012 season saw Jeter on a hot streak: he batted .420 through April 25. Rodriguez commented that Jeter is playing as he did in 1999, while Girardi said Jeter looks like he is 25 years old. In the 2012 MLB All-Star Game, Jeter recorded his 11th All-Star hit, passing Mantle for the most All-Star Game hits in Yankees history. Jeter went 1-for-2 in the game, moving into fourth all-time with a .458 average among players with a minimum of 12 plate appearances in the All-Star Game.

Jeter finished the 2012 season with the most hits in MLB (216). Against the Tampa Bay Rays on September 14 of that year, he moved into the Top 10 on the all-time hit list, surpassing Willie Mays by beating out an infield single for his 3,284th career hit. After hitting .364 in the 2012 ALDS, Jeter fractured his left ankle during Game 1 of the 2012 ALCS against the Detroit Tigers reaching for a ground ball, an injury which ended his season. Jeter had received a cortisone shot to treat a bone bruise in his left foot in September, which could have contributed to the break. Jeter had surgery on his broken left ankle on October 20, with an expected recovery time of four to five months.

While rehabilitating, Jeter suffered a small crack in the area of his previous ankle fracture. As a result, Jeter began the 2013 season on the disabled list. The Yankees activated Jeter on July 11, but after playing in one game, Jeter returned to the disabled list with a quadriceps strain. He returned to the Yankees lineup on July 28, hitting a home run on the first pitch off of Matt Moore of Tampa Bay. Jeter was again placed on the 15-day disabled list on August 5 due to a Grade 1 calf strain, and after a brief return to the lineup, he was placed on the 15-day disabled list for a third time on September 11 due to problems with his ankle, ending his season. On September 14, 2013, Jeter was transferred to the 60-day disabled list. Jeter batted .190 in only 17 games played during the 2013 season.

==== 2014: Final season ====
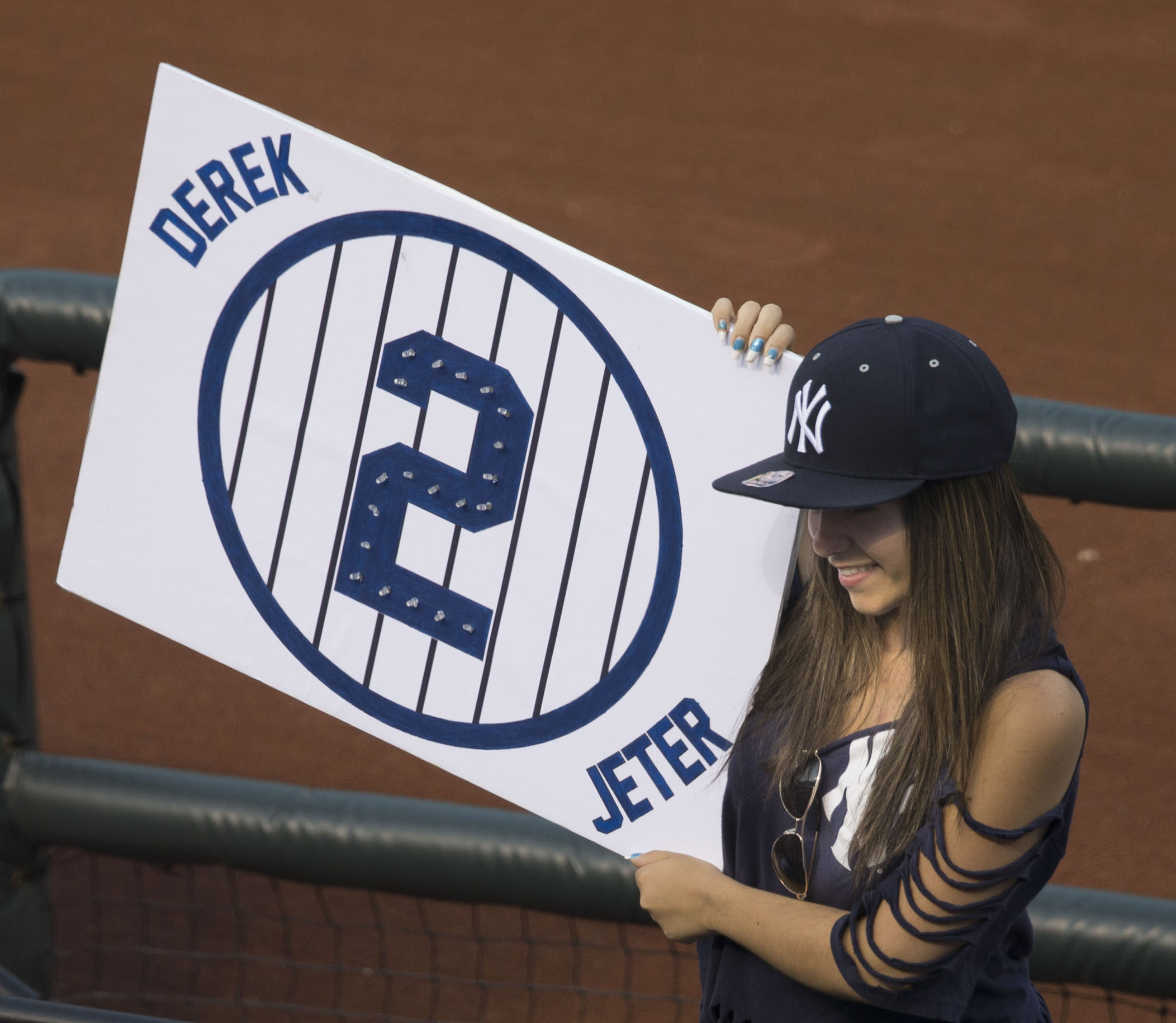
A fan holding a sign honoring Jeter during his final season

Jeter re-signed with the Yankees on a one-year, $12 million contract for the 2014 season. Jeter announced on his Facebook page on February 12, 2014, that the 2014 season would be his last. During his final season, each opposing team honored Jeter with a gift during his final visit to their city, which has included donations to Jeter's charity, the Turn 2 Foundation.

On July 10, Jeter recorded his 1,000th career multi-hit game, becoming the fourth player to do so. He was elected to start at shortstop in the 2014 All-Star Game, and batted leadoff for the AL. Jeter went 2-for-2, scored one run and received two standing ovations in the four innings he played at the 2014 All-Star Game. As a result, Jeter's .481 career All-Star batting average (13-for-27) ranked him fifth all-time (among players with at least 10 at-bats). At 40, Jeter also became the oldest player to have two or more hits in an All-Star Game. In July, Jeter broke Omar Vizquel's MLB career record of 2,609 games started at shortstop, and Gehrig's franchise career record of 534 doubles. On July 17, Derek scored the 1,900th run of his career becoming the 10th player in MLB history to do so. Jeter passed Carl Yastrzemski for seventh place on MLB's all-time career hit list on July 28 and on August 11 he passed Honus Wagner climbing to sixth on the all-time hits list.

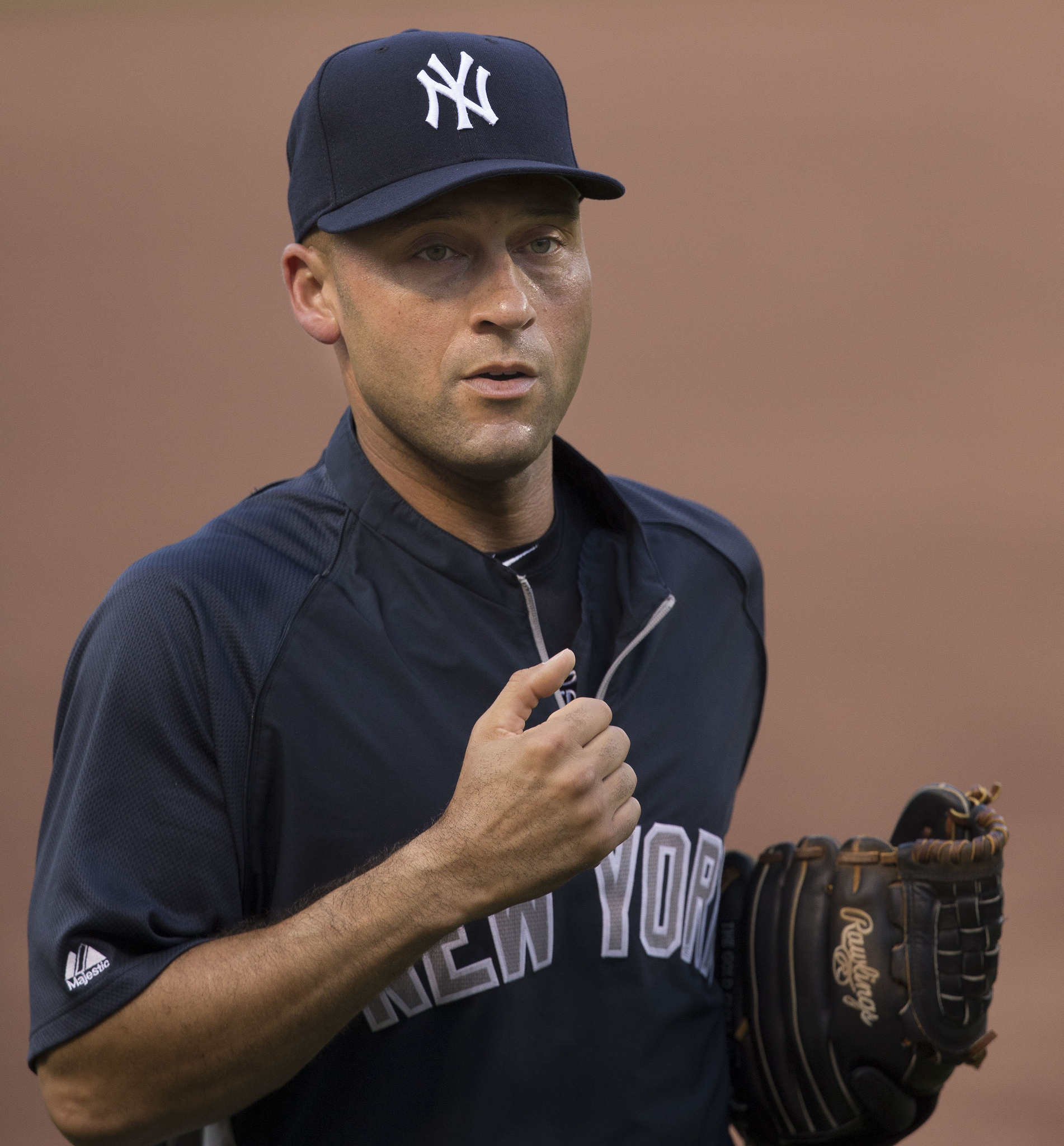
Jeter during pre-game warmups in July 2014

The Yankees honored Jeter with a pregame tribute on September 7. Beginning with that day's game, the Yankees wore a patch on their hats and uniforms honoring Jeter for the remainder of the season. In the final week of Jeter's career, MLB Commissioner Bud Selig honored him as the 15th recipient of the Commissioner's Historic Achievement Award for being "one of the most accomplished shortstops of all-time."

During Jeter's final series at Yankee Stadium, Louisville Slugger announced they would retire their "P72" model baseball bat, the bat Jeter uses, though it will be sold under the name "DJ2," in Jeter's honor. The average ticket price for Jeter's final home game, on September 25, reached $830 on the secondary ticket market. In his final game at Yankee Stadium, Jeter hit a walk-off single against Orioles pitcher Evan Meek to win the game, 6–5.

Jeter decided to play exclusively as the designated hitter in the final series of his career, at Fenway Park in Boston, so that his final memories of playing shortstop would be at Yankee Stadium. The Red Sox honored Jeter with a pregame ceremony including Red Sox retired stars Carl Yastrzemski, Jim Rice, Fred Lynn, Luis Tiant and Rico Petrocelli, the Boston Bruins' Bobby Orr, New England Patriots receiver Troy Brown and the Boston Celtics' Paul Pierce, while many Boston fans at Fenway Park loudly cheered for Jeter and gave him a standing ovation. In his final at-bat, he hit an RBI infield single against Clay Buchholz, before being substituted for pinch runner Brian McCann; he received an ovation from the Red Sox fans as he exited the field.

== International career ==
Jeter started at shortstop for the United States national baseball team in the 2006 World Baseball Classic. He hit 9-for-20 (.450) and scored five runs in six games. Only teammate Ken Griffey Jr. (.524) and Cuba's Yoandy Garlobo (.480) had a higher batting average with a minimum of 20 at-bats. Jeter's play earned him recognition as the shortstop selection on the All-Tournament Team.

In the 2009 World Baseball Classic, Jeter again started at shortstop. He was named captain of the United States team by manager Davey Johnson, and he batted 8-for-29 (.276) in eight games. Jeter and the United States team faced the Yankees at Steinbrenner Field in an exhibition game, the only time Jeter played against the Yankees.

== Player profile ==
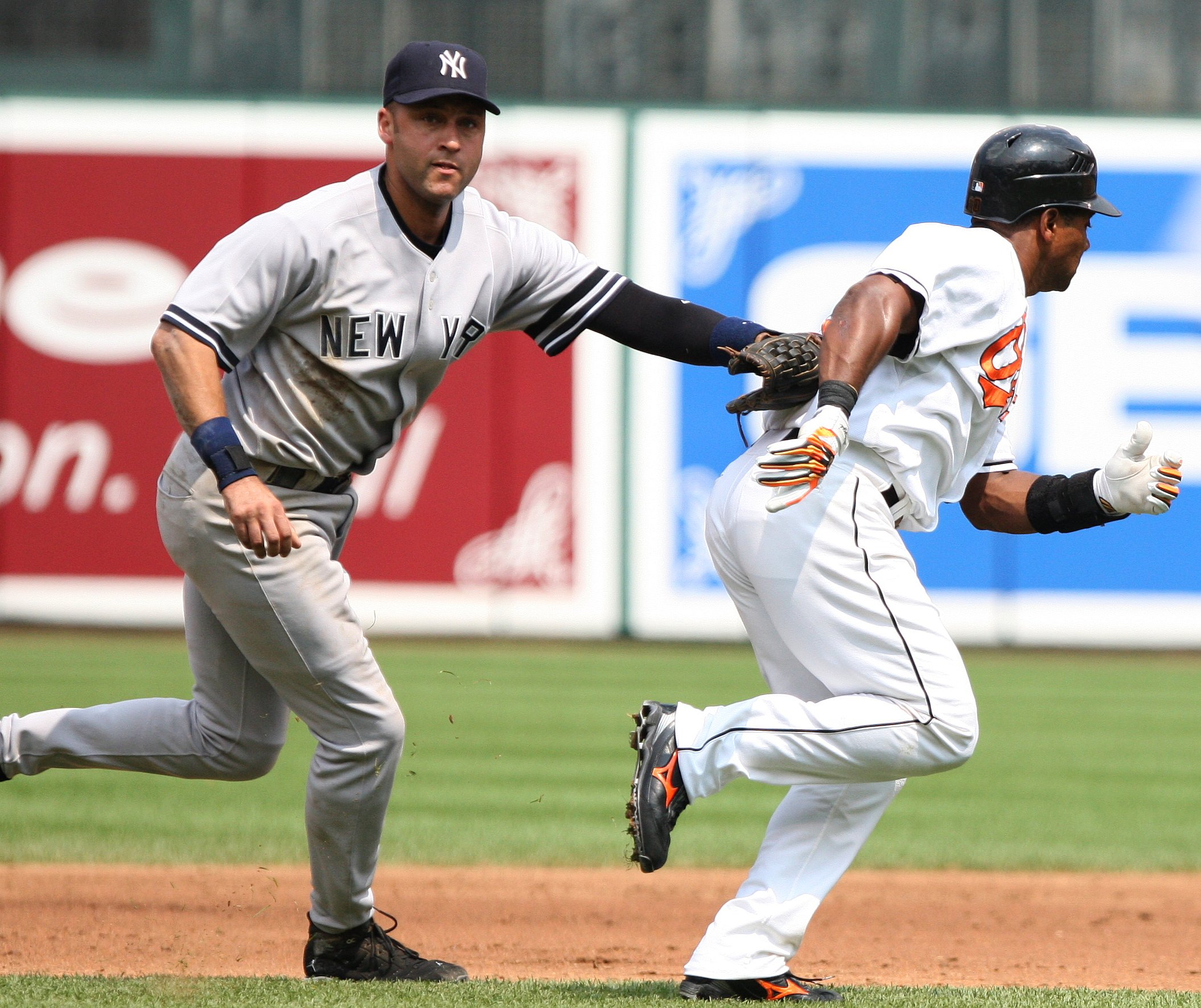
Jeter tagging out Miguel Tejada in 2007

Jeter is considered to be one of the most consistent baseball players of all time. For his career, he averaged 204 hits, 113 runs scored and 21 stolen bases per 162 games. He is currently sixth on the all-time hits list in MLB history. Highly competitive, Jeter once said, "If you're going to play at all, you're out to win. Baseball, board games, playing Jeopardy!, I hate to lose." Jeter has been viewed as one of the best players of his generation.

An aggressive hitter, Jeter swung at most pitches in the strike zone and many near it. Though right-handed hitters often pull the ball into left field, Jeter's signature inside-out swing, dubbed the "Jeterian Swing", resulted in most of his hits going to center and right field. Similarly, most of his home runs were hit to right field rather than to center or to left, as his swing took advantage of Yankee Stadium's close right-field fences.

"Derek Jeter has always been above the fray. As someone who's wallowed in it, 'foot-in-mouthed' it hundreds of times, said dumb things and backed up dumber ones, it's refreshing. He's shown up, played, and turned in a first-ballot Hall of Fame career in the hardest environment in sports to do any/all of the above."

— Curt Schilling, September 14, 2009

Jeter is also known for his professionalism. In an age where professional athletes often found themselves in personal scandals, he mostly avoided major controversy in a high-profile career in New York City while maintaining a strong work ethic. Due to his style of play, opponents and teammates held him in high esteem. A clubhouse leader, Jeter often defused confrontations between teammates.

=== Postseason performance ===
Jeter is noted for his postseason performances and has earned the titles of "Captain Clutch", and "Mr. November" due to his outstanding postseason play. He had a career .309 postseason batting average, and a .321 batting average in the World Series. Except for 2008, 2013 and 2014, the Yankees qualified for the postseason every year of Jeter's major league career. He holds MLB postseason records for games played (158), plate appearances (734), at-bats (650), hits (200), singles (143), doubles (32), triples (5), runs scored (111), total bases (302) and strikeouts (135). Jeter is also fourth in home runs (20) and runs batted in (61), fifth in base on balls (66) and sixth in stolen bases (18).

=== Defense ===
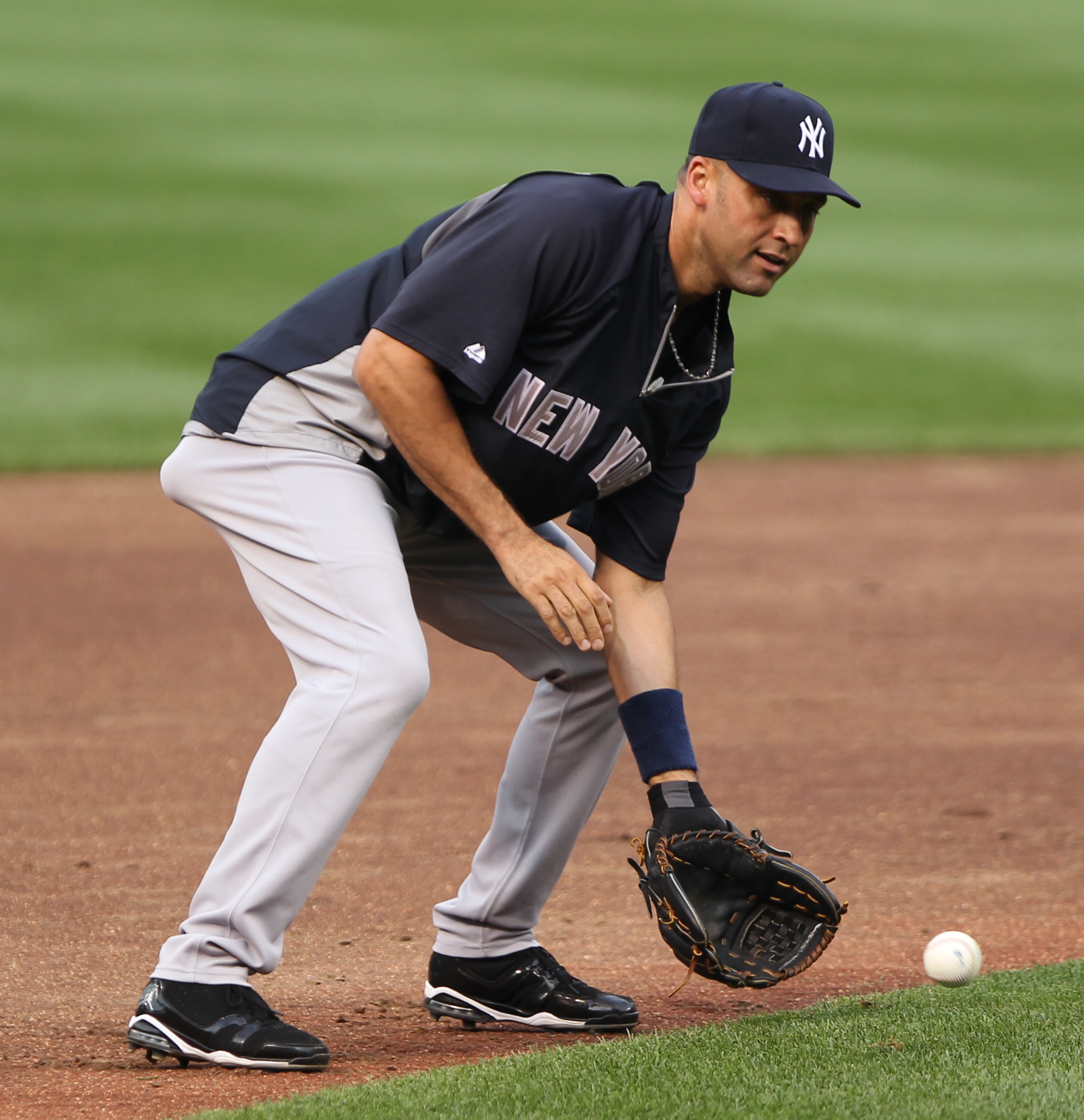
Jeter practices fielding in August 2011

Jeter won five Gold Glove Awards, trailing only Vizquel, Ozzie Smith, Luis Aparicio, Dave Concepción, and Mark Belanger for most by a shortstop. He was credited with positioning himself well and for a quick release when he threw the ball. One of his signature defensive plays is the "jump-throw", by which he leapt and threw to first base while moving towards third base.

Despite this, Jeter's defense was the subject of criticism from a number of sabermetricians, including Rob Neyer and the publication Baseball Prospectus. The 2006 book The Fielding Bible by John Dewan contains an essay by Bill James in which he concluded that Jeter "was probably the most ineffective defensive player in the major leagues, at any position" over his entire career. A 2008 study by researchers at the University of Pennsylvania found that, from 2002 through 2005, Jeter was the worst defensive shortstop in MLB. Two sites that rely on advanced defensive statistics, FanGraphs.com and FieldingBible.com, rated Jeter below middle-of-the-pack status in 2010, despite his receiving his fifth Gold Glove Award that season.

Jeter committed 18 errors in 2007, his highest total since finishing with 24 in 2000. After the season, Cashman and his staff saw Jeter's defense as an area that needed to be addressed. At the Yankees' request, Jeter embarked on a rigorous training program to combat the effects of age, by focusing on lateral movement and first-step quickness. Jeter's ultimate zone rating (UZR) improved from worst in the AL for shortstops in 2007 to close to league average in 2008.

When asked to respond to criticism of his defense, Jeter replied: "I play in New York, man. Criticism is part of the game, you take criticism as a challenge." Jeter further asserted that many defensive factors cannot be quantified. The controversy over Jeter's fielding became a flash point for the debate over whether the analyses of statistics or subjective observation is the better method to assess a player's defensive ability and for criticism of the Gold Glove Award.

== Personal life ==
Jeter has owned homes in Marlboro Township, New Jersey; Greenwood Lake, New York; and the Davis Islands neighborhood of Tampa, Florida. He previously owned a penthouse apartment in Manhattan's Trump World Tower. Jeter settled a tax dispute regarding his official residence with the New York State Department of Taxation and Finance in 2008. New York State alleged that Jeter should have paid state income tax from 2001 to 2003 because Jeter resided in the Manhattan apartment he bought in 2001. Jeter claimed to have established his residence in Tampa Bay, Florida, in 1994, and that he was still a resident of Florida at the time. Florida has no state income tax. As of 2020, Jeter and his wife (the former model Hannah Davis) reside in Miami.

In December 2002, Yankees owner George Steinbrenner criticized Jeter for staying out until 3 a.m. at a birthday party during the 2002 season, saying that his star shortstop "wasn't totally focused" and that "it didn't sit well" with him. The two mocked the incident in a May 2003 Visa commercial, similar to the manner in which Steinbrenner and former Yankees manager Billy Martin made light of their feud in a Miller Lite commercial during the 1970s.

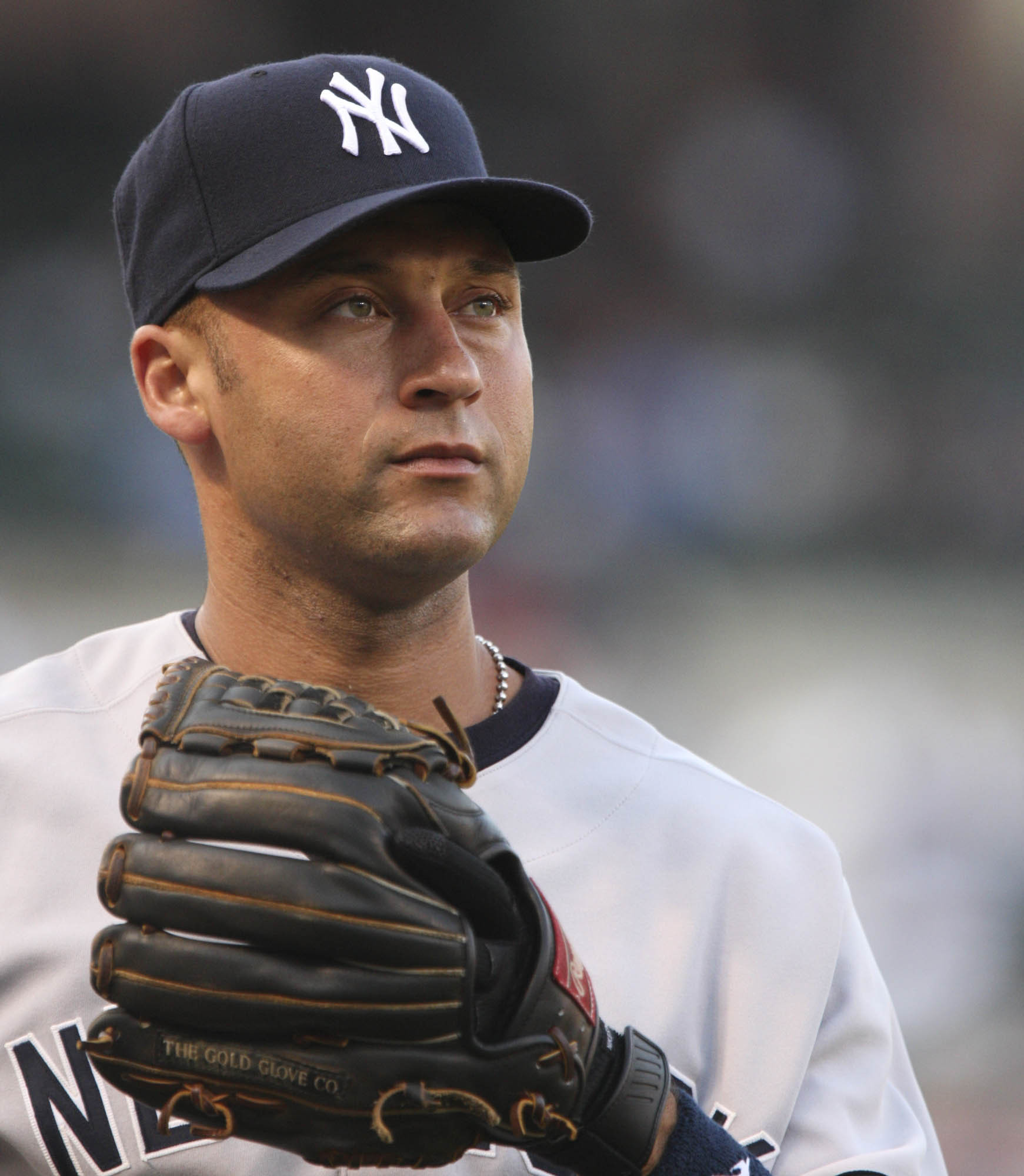
Jeter in 2007

Jeter's personal life has been a frequent topic in gossip columns and celebrity magazines since his rookie year in 1996. Jeter dated singer-songwriter Mariah Carey from 1997 to 1998. Carey wrote the song "My All" about a night she spent with Jeter in Puerto Rico, and cowrote the song "The Roof (Back in Time)" about their first kiss. Jeter has also dated model Vida Guerra, former Miss Universe Lara Dutta, singer Joy Enriquez, television personality Vanessa Minnillo, and the actresses Jordana Brewster, Jessica Biel, and Minka Kelly.

Jeter is Catholic, having been raised in the faith, attending Catholic schools as a child and identifying with the faith while playing for the Yankees.

Jeter and Sports Illustrated Swimsuit Issue cover model Hannah Davis, whom he had been dating since 2012, became engaged in 2015. In July 2016, the two married. They have three daughters and a son.

== Business interests ==
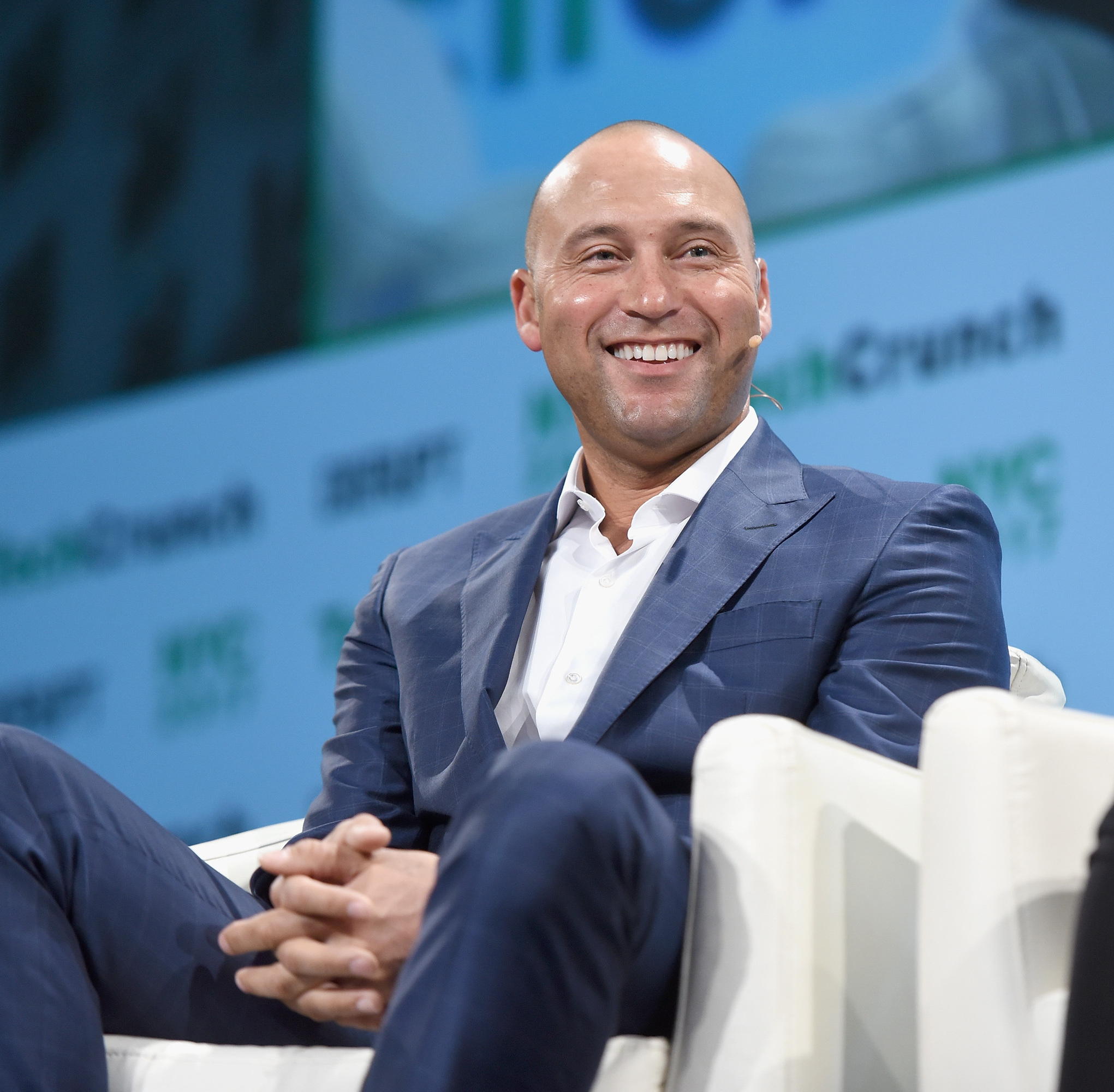
Jeter at TechCrunch Disrupt in 2017

During his injury-shortened 2013 season, Jeter arranged a partnership with Simon & Schuster to form an imprint called Jeter Publishing. He called it "the blueprint for postcareer" and intended to publish nonfiction books for adults, children's picture books, and elementary grade fiction.

In 2014, Jeter launched The Players' Tribune, a website with columns contributed by athletes. It was billed as "a new media platform that will present the unfiltered voice of professional athletes, bringing fans closer to the games they love than ever before." It was reported by the Tampa Bay Business Journal in March 2015 that Jeter had partnered with Concessions Tampa to bid for a space within the Tampa International Airport, and plans to open a restaurant named after his website.

Jeter also serves as a brand development officer for Luvo Inc. and has investment interests in multi-channel video network company, Whistle Sports Network. He explored purchasing the Buffalo Bills football team in 2014.

Jeter joined the board of Rockefeller Capital Management in 2021.

=== Miami Marlins ===
In 2017, Jeter partnered with Bruce Sherman to purchase ownership of the Miami Marlins. The sale was completed in September 2017, following unanimous approval of the other 29 MLB team owners. Though Jeter only owned a 4% stake in the franchise, he was named chief executive officer (CEO) of the team, and Sherman, the controlling owner, entrusted him to oversee day-to-day operations of the team.

In February 2022, Jeter announced that he would no longer serve as CEO of the Marlins or hold any shares in the club. After more than four years as the Miami Marlins' chief executive, he ended the relationship and sold his 4% ownership in the team.

=== Arena Club ===
In September 2022, Jeter announced that he joined entrepreneur Brian Lee and multiple capital venture firms in launching a card grading, storage vault, and marketplace platform named Arena Club.

== Appearances outside of baseball ==
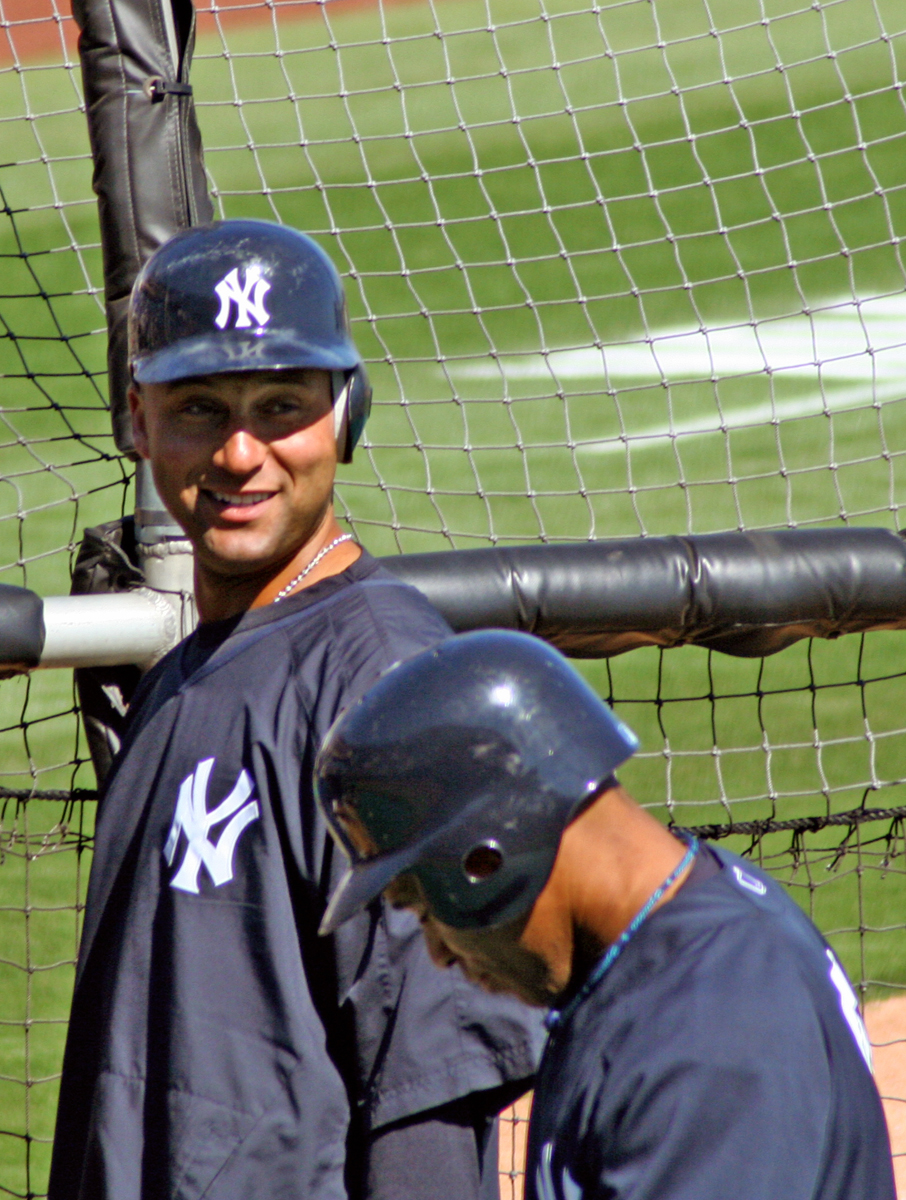
Jeter joking with other players during Spring training in 2007

=== Philanthropy ===
Jeter created the Turn 2 Foundation, a charitable organization, in 1996. It was established to help children and teenagers avoid drug and alcohol addiction, and to reward those who show high academic achievement. In 2012, Jeter received an honorary doctorate from Siena College honoring him for his foundation's work.

Since 2009, Jeter has served as an ambassador for Weplay, a website designed to encourage children to get involved in sports. Jeter, along with Japanese baseball player Hideki Matsui, took part in a charity baseball game at Tokyo Dome to raise funds for survivors of the 2011 Tōhoku earthquake and tsunami.

In 2018, Jeter donated furniture and household items to families forced to relocate by Hurricane Irma. In July 2019, Jeter donated $3.2 million from the Turn 2 Foundation to the Kalamazoo Public School District to renovate the school's baseball and softball complex.

=== Endorsements ===
Jeter has appeared in national ad campaigns for Nike, Gatorade, Fleet Bank, Subway, Ford, VISA, Discover Card, Florsheim, Gillette, Skippy, and XM Satellite Radio. He endorses a cologne named Driven, designed in collaboration with and distributed by Avon. Jeter has his own Jumpman shoe. To commemorate Jeter's final year, the Jordan brand made a tribute commercial titled "#RE2PECT", which had many baseball players (such as Jon Lester) and celebrities, even rival Boston Red Sox fans, tip their caps.

In 2006, Jeter was the second-highest paid endorser in baseball, behind Ichiro Suzuki, who received endorsement deals in Japan. He was ranked as the most marketable player in baseball according to the 2003, 2005, and 2010 Sports Business Surveys. A 2011 list by the marketing firm Nielsen ranked Jeter as the most marketable player in baseball, accounting for personal attributes such as sincerity, approachability, experience, and influence.

=== Other appearances ===
Jeter has appeared on television as a guest actor in the sitcom Seinfeld in the episode titled "The Abstinence", and Saturday Night Live, a late-night live television sketch comedy and variety show, in episode 7 during season 27. He had cameo appearances in the comedy films Anger Management and The Other Guys. Jeter was the subject of a 2005 segment on the TV news magazine 60 Minutes and a 2014 episode of Finding Your Roots, a Public Broadcasting Service (PBS) television series. Jeter also appears as a character in the Broadway play Bronx Bombers.

Jeter made an appearance alongside Peyton Manning in the Saturday Night Live 40th Anniversary Special in February 2015. In addition, in the sketch "Yankee Wives", wives (Amy Poehler, Maya Rudolph, Rachel Dratch, Ana Gasteyer) of Yankee players gossip in the stands and welcome a new Yankee wife, Derek Jeter.

Video games have featured Jeter on their cover, including 2K Sports' MLB 2K5, MLB 2K6, and MLB 2K7, Acclaim Entertainment's All-Star Baseball series of video games from the 2000 till 2005 edition, and Gameloft's wireless phone baseball game, Derek Jeter Pro Baseball 2008. A wax figure immortalizes Jeter at the Madame Tussauds Wax Museum in New York, and a sculpture at the Louisville Slugger Museum & Factory in Louisville, Kentucky.

The Captain, a documentary miniseries about Jeter's life and career, debuted on ESPN in 2022.

During Fox Sports' pregame coverage of Super Bowl LVII, Jeter announced that he would be joining Fox Sports as a studio analyst for MLB on Fox. He became part of Fox's lead studio team alongside former teammate Alex Rodriguez and rival David Ortiz, providing analysis during regular-season telecasts and the network's coverage of the MLB postseason, including the League Championship Series and World Series.

== Career highlights ==
=== Honors ===
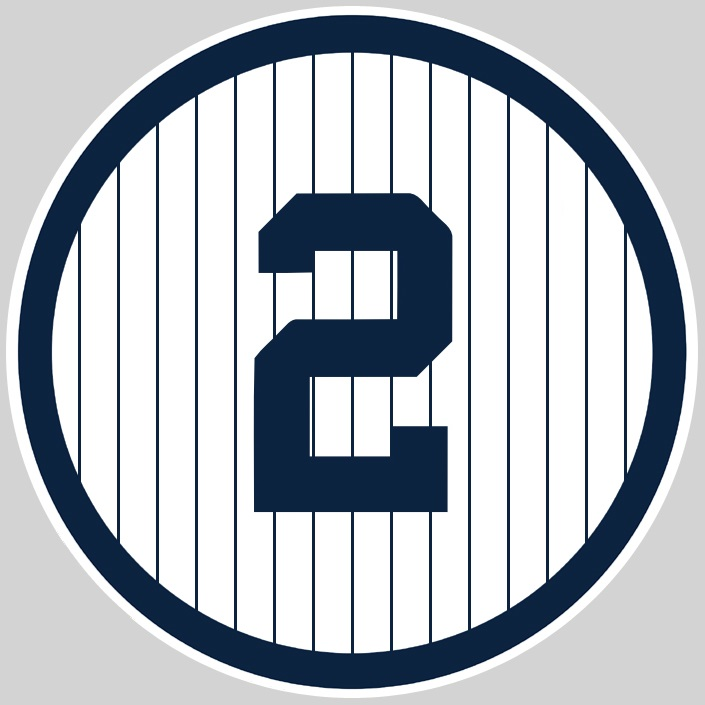
Derek Jeter's number 2 was retired by the New York Yankees in 2017.

Kalamazoo Central High School inducted Jeter into its athletic hall of fame in 2003 and renamed its baseball field in his honor in 2011. In 2015, Jeter was inducted into the New Jersey Hall of Fame. The Yankees retired Jeter's uniform number and unveiled a plaque in his honor that was installed at Monument Park in a pregame ceremony on May 14, 2017.

On January 21, 2020, Jeter was elected to the Baseball Hall of Fame as part of its class of 2020 in his first year of eligibility, only one vote shy of being only the second unanimous selection in Hall of Fame history. His 99.7% of the vote was second only to Mariano Rivera (100%), and ahead of Ken Griffey (99.3%) in the history of Hall of Fame voting; since the 2025 ballot, his vote share has been matched by Ichiro Suzuki. He was formally enshrined in a ceremony on September 8, 2021, in Cooperstown, New York.

=== Awards ===
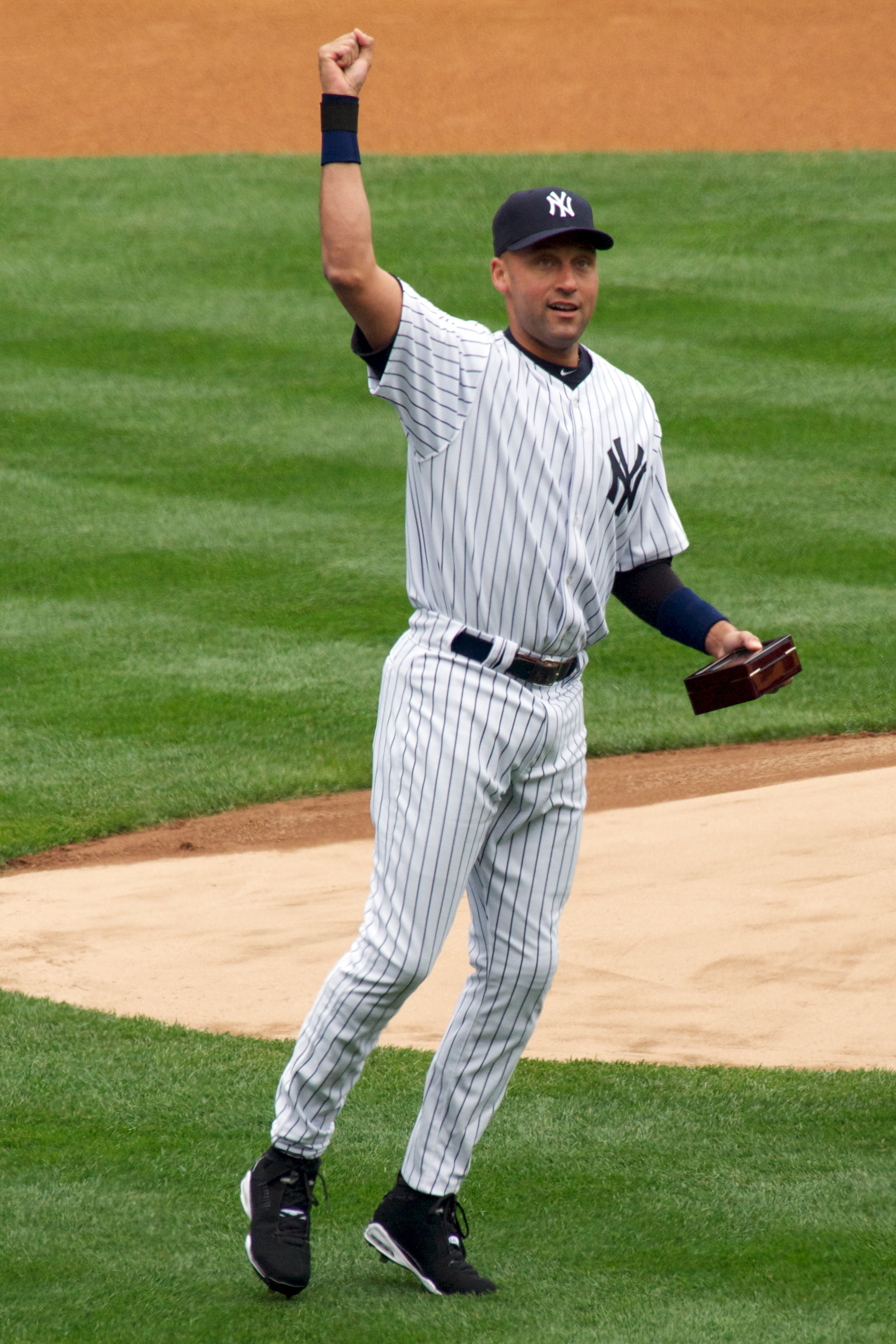
Jeter receives his 2009 World Series Championship ring

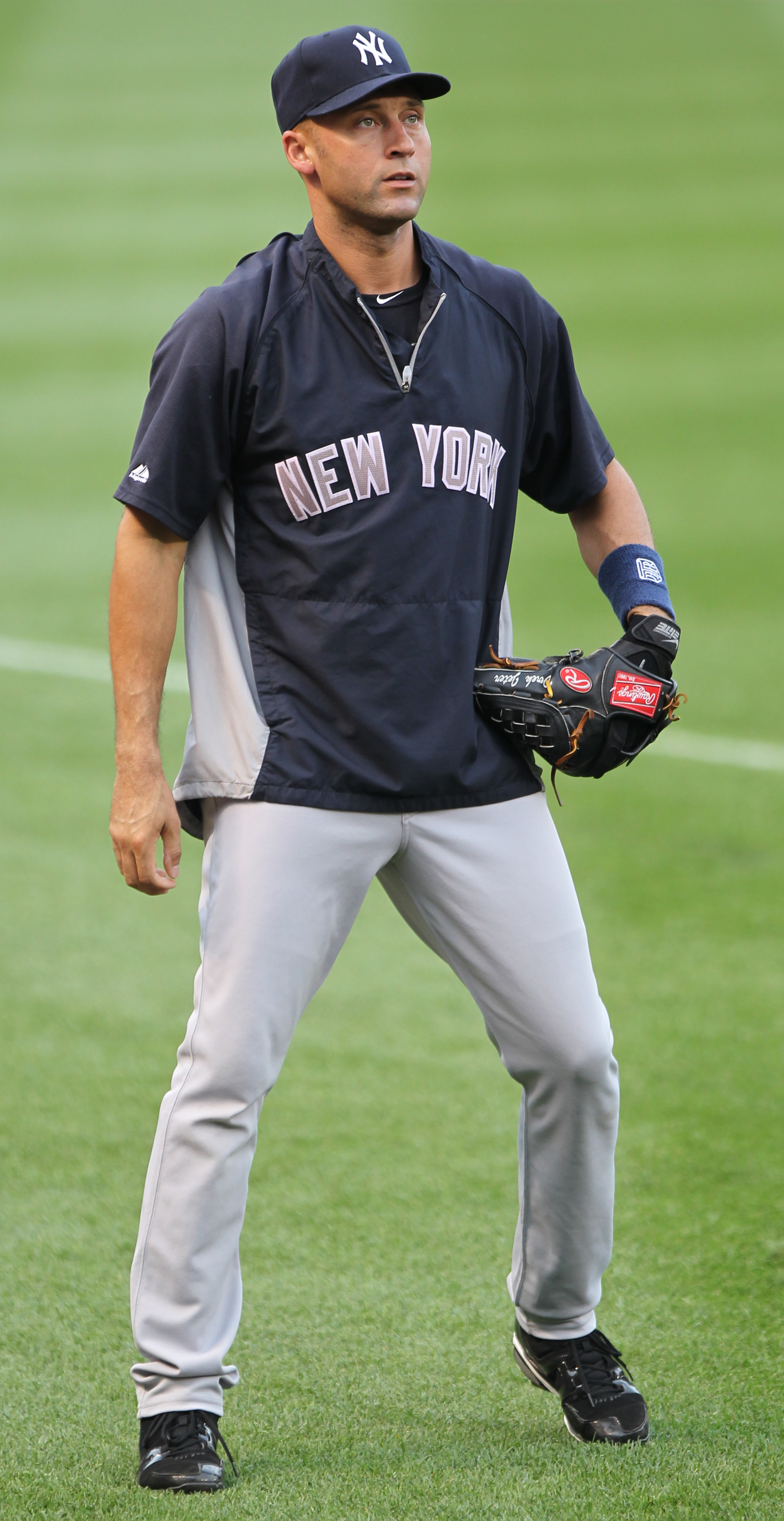
Jeter warming up before a game in 2011

Award / Honor	Time(s)	Date(s)
AL All-Star	14	1998, 1999, 2000, 2001, 2002, 2004, 2006, 2007, 2008, 2009, 2010, 2011, 2012, 2014
New York Yankees Player of the Year	5	1998, 1999, 2000, 2006, 2009
AL Gold Glove Award (SS)	5	2004, 2005, 2006, 2009, 2010
AL Silver Slugger Award (SS)	5	2006, 2007, 2008, 2009, 2012
GIBBY Awards Moment of the Year	2	2008, 2009
Hank Aaron Award	2	2006, 2009
GIBBY Awards Performance of the Year	1	2011
GIBBY Awards Moment of the Year	1	2014
GIBBY Awards Walk-Off of the Year	1	2014
Lou Gehrig Memorial Award	1	2010
Sporting News All-Decade Team (shortstop)	1	2009
Sports Illustrated MLB All-Decade Team (shortstop)	1	2009
Roberto Clemente Award	1	2009
Sports Illustrated Sportsman of the Year	1	2009
ESPY Awards Best MLB Player	1	2007
Inductee in Kalamazoo Central High School Athletic Hall of Fame	1	2007
Baseball Digest Player of the Year	1	2006
GIBBY Awards Hitter of the Year Award	1	2006
Baseball America 1st-Team Major League All-Star (SS)	1	2006
All-World Baseball Classic Team	1	2006
GIBBY Awards Play of the Year	1	2004
Players Choice Award Rookie of the Year	1	2004
The Sporting News "Good Guy in Sports" Award	1	2002
ESPY Awards Best Play ESPY Award	1	2002
Babe Ruth Award	1	2000
All-Star Game Most Valuable Player Award	1	2000
World Series Most Valuable Player Award	1	2000
Joan Payson Award for Community Service	1	1997
AL Rookie of the Year	1	1996
International League All-Star	1	1995
Florida State League All-Star	1	1994
Florida State League Most Valuable Player	1	1994
Baseball America Minor League Player of the Year	1	1994
The Sporting News Minor League Player of the Year	1	1994
Topps/NAPBL Minor League Player of the Year	1	1994
New York Yankees Minor League Player of the Year	1	1994
South Atlantic League All-Star	1	1993
South Atlantic League's Best Defensive Shortstop, Most Exciting Player, Best Infield Arm	1	1993
American Baseball Coaches Association High School Player of the Year	1	1992
USA Today High School Player of the Year	1	1992
Gatorade High School Athlete of the Year	1	1992

=== Statistical highlights ===
- Led League
  - Singles (1997, 1998)
  - Runs scored (1998)
  - Hits (1999, 2012)
- League Top–Ten
  - Hits (1997–2002, 2004–2007, 2009, 2012)
  - Runs scored (1997–2002, 2004–2006, 2009–2010, 2012)
  - Batting average (1998–2001, 2003, 2005–2007, 2009, 2012)
  - Total bases (1999)
  - AL MVP voting (1998–2001, 2005–2006, 2009, 2012)

== See also ==
- List of Major League Baseball annual runs scored leaders
- List of Major League Baseball batting champions
- List of Major League Baseball career doubles leaders
- List of Major League Baseball career hits leaders
- List of Major League Baseball career stolen bases leaders
- List of Major League Baseball career runs scored leaders
- List of Major League Baseball career runs batted in leaders
- List of Major League Baseball career total bases leaders
- List of Major League Baseball career home run leaders
- List of Major League Baseball hit records
- List of Major League Baseball players who spent their entire career with one franchise
- List of Major League Baseball postseason records
- List of New York Yankees team records
- New York Yankees award winners and league leaders

== Notes ==
Awards and achievements
Preceded by Adrián González and Michael Young; Dante Bichette	Major League Baseball annual hits leader 2012; 1999	Succeeded by Adrián Beltré and Matt Carpenter; Darin Erstad
Preceded by Albert Belle	American League Player of the Month; August 1998	Succeeded by Albert Belle
