= Derek Jeter Pro Baseball 2008 =

2008 video game

- Developer: Gameloft
- Publisher: Gameloft
- Platform: Mobile phones
- Release: NA: March 6, 2008
- Genre: Sports
- Mode: Single-player

Batter/pitcher interface.

Derek Jeter Pro Baseball 2008 is the fourth in a series of baseball video games developed and published by Gameloft. It was released on March 6, 2008.

The game can be run in full 3D on wireless phones that can handle the graphic upgrade, and features a 58-game season, with playoffs and league stats included, as well as baseball tips offered by Jeter mid-game. The game also features an advanced Difficult level.
