= 2025 Baseball United season =

- Sport: Baseball
- Duration: November 14 – December 14, 2025
- Teams: 4

United Series
- Season champions: Mid East Falcons
- Runners-up: Mumbai Cobras

The 2025 Baseball United season was held from 14 November to 14 December 2025. The best-of-three championship, called the United Series, featured the top two teams in the four-team league, played from 12 to 14 December. Mid East Falcons won the championship. This was the inaugural season of the Baseball United.

Following the season, founder Kash Shaikh stepped down.

== Teams ==
Team	City	Country
Mumbai Cobras	Mumbai	India
Karachi Monarchs	Karachi	Pakistan
Arabia Wolves	Dubai	United Arab Emirates
Mid East Falcons	Abu Dhabi	United Arab Emirates

== Venue ==
All games were played at the Baseball United Ballpark in Dubai, United Arab Emirates.

== Regular season ==
Pos	Team	Pld	W	L	RF	RA	RD	PCT	GB	Qualification
1	Mid East Falcons	9	6	3	44	25	+19	.667	—	United Series
2	Mumbai Cobras	9	6	3	55	40	+15	.667	—	United Series
3	Arabia Wolves	9	4	5	50	53	−3	.444	2	
4	Karachi Monarchs	9	2	7	27	58	−31	.222	4	

Source: Baseball United

14 November 2025; 20:00 (UTC+04:00)	Karachi Monarchs	6–4	Mumbai Cobras	Baseball United Ballpark, Dubai, UAE; Umpires: Zdenek Zidek
14 November 2025; 20:00 (UTC+04:00)	WP: Alex Dubord (1–0); Sv: Enrique Burgos (1)	Boxscore	LP: Akeel Morris (0–1)	Baseball United Ballpark, Dubai, UAE; Umpires: Zdenek Zidek
14 November 2025; 20:00 (UTC+04:00)	HR: Pavin Parks 2 (2)	Boxscore	HR: Lou Helmig (1)	Baseball United Ballpark, Dubai, UAE; Umpires: Zdenek Zidek

15 November 2025; 20:00 (UTC+04:00)	Mumbai Cobras	8–4	Karachi Monarchs	Baseball United Ballpark, Dubai, UAE; Umpires: Jair Fernandez
15 November 2025; 20:00 (UTC+04:00)	WP: Brandon Kaminer (1–0)	Boxscore	LP: Franklin van Gurp (0–1)	Baseball United Ballpark, Dubai, UAE; Umpires: Jair Fernandez

16 November 2025; 16:00 (UTC+04:00)	Karachi Monarchs	2–9	Mumbai Cobras	Baseball United Ballpark, Dubai, UAE; Umpires: Frantisek Pribyl
16 November 2025; 16:00 (UTC+04:00)	LP: Konsta Kurikka (0–1)	Boxscore	WP: Chase Gearing (1–0)	Baseball United Ballpark, Dubai, UAE; Umpires: Frantisek Pribyl
16 November 2025; 16:00 (UTC+04:00)		Boxscore	HR: Caleb McNeely (1), Miguel Ojeda Jr. (1)	Baseball United Ballpark, Dubai, UAE; Umpires: Frantisek Pribyl

18 November 2025; 19:00 (UTC+04:00)	Mumbai Cobras	5–3	Arabia Wolves	Baseball United Ballpark, Dubai, UAE; Umpires: Humberto Saiz
18 November 2025; 19:00 (UTC+04:00)	WP: Tushar Lalwani (1–0)	Boxscore	LP: Sean Fekete (0–1)	Baseball United Ballpark, Dubai, UAE; Umpires: Humberto Saiz

19 November 2025; 19:00 (UTC+04:00)	Mid East Falcons	2–0	Karachi Monarchs	Baseball United Ballpark, Dubai, UAE; Umpires: Zdenek Zidek
19 November 2025; 19:00 (UTC+04:00)	WP: Kazuki Yabuta (1–0); Sv: Severino González (1)	Boxscore	LP: Mark Simon (0–1)	Baseball United Ballpark, Dubai, UAE; Umpires: Zdenek Zidek

20 November 2025; 19:00 (UTC+04:00)	Arabia Wolves	6–13	Mumbai Cobras	Baseball United Ballpark, Dubai, UAE; Umpires: Jair Fernandez
20 November 2025; 19:00 (UTC+04:00)	LP: Blake Purnell (0–1)	Boxscore	WP: Akshay More (1–0)	Baseball United Ballpark, Dubai, UAE; Umpires: Jair Fernandez
20 November 2025; 19:00 (UTC+04:00)	HR: Noah Marcelo (1), Christiaan Beyers (1), Jacob Teter (1)	Boxscore	HR: Lou Helmig (2), Caleb McNeely 2 (3)	Baseball United Ballpark, Dubai, UAE; Umpires: Jair Fernandez

21 November 2025; 20:00 (UTC+04:00)	Karachi Monarchs	1–9	Mid East Falcons	Baseball United Ballpark, Dubai, UAE; Umpires: Frantisek Pribyl
21 November 2025; 20:00 (UTC+04:00)	LP: Scott Ellis (0–1)	Boxscore	WP: Kodai Hamaya (1–0)	Baseball United Ballpark, Dubai, UAE; Umpires: Frantisek Pribyl
21 November 2025; 20:00 (UTC+04:00)		Boxscore	HR: Shuhei Fukuda (1)	Baseball United Ballpark, Dubai, UAE; Umpires: Frantisek Pribyl

22 November 2025; 19:00 (UTC+04:00)	Mumbai Cobras	6–9	Arabia Wolves	Baseball United Ballpark, Dubai, UAE; Umpires: Humberto Saiz
22 November 2025; 19:00 (UTC+04:00)	LP: Akeel Morris (0–2)	Boxscore	WP: Reese Miller (1–0)	Baseball United Ballpark, Dubai, UAE; Umpires: Humberto Saiz
22 November 2025; 19:00 (UTC+04:00)	HR: Raul Shah (1)	Boxscore	HR: Taylor Darden 2 (2), Noah Marcelo (1)	Baseball United Ballpark, Dubai, UAE; Umpires: Humberto Saiz

23 November 2025; 16:00 (UTC+04:00)	Mid East Falcons	3–5	Karachi Monarchs	Baseball United Ballpark, Dubai, UAE; Umpires: Zdenek Zidek
23 November 2025; 16:00 (UTC+04:00)	LP: Shotaro Nakata (0–1)	Boxscore	WP: Isaac Milburn (1–0); Sv: Enrique Burgos (2)	Baseball United Ballpark, Dubai, UAE; Umpires: Zdenek Zidek
23 November 2025; 16:00 (UTC+04:00)	HR: Shuhei Fukuda (2)	Boxscore		Baseball United Ballpark, Dubai, UAE; Umpires: Zdenek Zidek

25 November 2025; 19:00 (UTC+04:00)	Mumbai Cobras	1–0	Mid East Falcons	Baseball United Ballpark, Dubai, UAE; Umpires: Jair Fernandez
25 November 2025; 19:00 (UTC+04:00)	WP: Akshay More (1–0); Sv: Akeel Morris (1)	Boxscore	LP: Kazuki Yabuta (1–1)	Baseball United Ballpark, Dubai, UAE; Umpires: Jair Fernandez

26 November 2025; 19:00 (UTC+04:00)	Karachi Monarchs	3–11	Arabia Wolves	Baseball United Ballpark, Dubai, UAE; Umpires: Humberto Saiz
26 November 2025; 19:00 (UTC+04:00)	LP: Mark Simon (0–2)	Boxscore	WP: Sean Fekete (1–1)	Baseball United Ballpark, Dubai, UAE; Umpires: Humberto Saiz
26 November 2025; 19:00 (UTC+04:00)	HR: Max Jung-Goldberg (1)	Boxscore		Baseball United Ballpark, Dubai, UAE; Umpires: Humberto Saiz

2 December 2025; 19:00 (UTC+04:00)	Mid East Falcons	7–3	Mumbai Cobras	Baseball United Ballpark, Dubai, UAE
2 December 2025; 19:00 (UTC+04:00)		Boxscore		Baseball United Ballpark, Dubai, UAE

3 December 2025; 19:00 (UTC+04:00)	Arabia Wolves	5–4	Karachi Monarchs	Baseball United Ballpark, Dubai, UAE
3 December 2025; 19:00 (UTC+04:00)		Boxscore		Baseball United Ballpark, Dubai, UAE

4 December 2025; 19:00 (UTC+04:00)	Mumbai Cobras	6–3	Mid East Falcons	Baseball United Ballpark, Dubai, UAE
4 December 2025; 19:00 (UTC+04:00)		Boxscore		Baseball United Ballpark, Dubai, UAE

5 December 2025; 20:00 (UTC+04:00)	Karachi Monarchs	2–7	Arabia Wolves	Baseball United Ballpark, Dubai, UAE
5 December 2025; 20:00 (UTC+04:00)		Boxscore		Baseball United Ballpark, Dubai, UAE

6 December 2025; 15:00 (UTC+04:00)	Mid East Falcons	9–5	Arabia Wolves	Baseball United Ballpark, Dubai, UAE
6 December 2025; 15:00 (UTC+04:00)		Boxscore		Baseball United Ballpark, Dubai, UAE

6 December 2025; 19:00 (UTC+04:00)	Arabia Wolves	2–8	Mid East Falcons	Baseball United Ballpark, Dubai, UAE
6 December 2025; 19:00 (UTC+04:00)		Boxscore		Baseball United Ballpark, Dubai, UAE

7 December 2025; 16:00 (UTC+04:00)	Mid East Falcons	3–2	Arabia Wolves	Baseball United Ballpark, Dubai, UAE
7 December 2025; 16:00 (UTC+04:00)		Boxscore		Baseball United Ballpark, Dubai, UAE

== United Series ==
Munenori Kawasaki was named the most valuable player of the United Series, won by the Mid East Falcons.

United Series (best-of-three)
1	Mid East Falcons	1	5	8
2	Mumbai Cobras	3	1	1

=== Games ===
12 December 2025; 20:00 (UTC+04:00); Game 1	Mid East Falcons	1–3	Mumbai Cobras	Baseball United Ballpark, Dubai, UAE
12 December 2025; 20:00 (UTC+04:00); Game 1		Boxscore		Baseball United Ballpark, Dubai, UAE

13 December 2025; 20:00 (UTC+04:00); Game 2	Mumbai Cobras	1–5	Mid East Falcons	Baseball United Ballpark, Dubai, UAE
13 December 2025; 20:00 (UTC+04:00); Game 2		Boxscore		Baseball United Ballpark, Dubai, UAE

14 December 2025; 16:00 (UTC+04:00); Game 3	Mid East Falcons	8–1	Mumbai Cobras	Baseball United Ballpark, Dubai, UAE
14 December 2025; 16:00 (UTC+04:00); Game 3		Boxscore		Baseball United Ballpark, Dubai, UAE

== League leaders ==
Hitting leaders
Stat	Player	Team	Total
AVG	(Japan) Hiroyuki Nakajima	Mid East	.425
HR	(United States) Caleb McNeely; Miguel Ojeda Jr.	Mumbai	3
RBI	(Italy) Federico Celli	Mid East	13
R	(United States) Caleb McNeely	Mumbai	11
H	(Japan) Hiroyuki Nakajima	Mumbai	15
SB	(Japan) Yo Kanahara	Mid East	6
SLG	(Poland) Hubert Zgórzyński	Arabia	.667
OPS	(United States) Jacob Teter	Arabia	1.171

Pitching leaders
Stat	Player	Team	Total
W	Four tied with (Note: Kazuki Yabuta (MDE), Akshay More (MUM), Shuto Sakurai (MDE), Chandler Woolridge (MUM))		2
ERA	(Japan) Shotaro Kasahara	Mid East	0.00 in 13 2/3 innings
K	(Japan) Kazuki Yabuta	Mid East	32
IP	(Japan) Kazuki Yabuta	Mid East	26 1/3
SV	(United States) Akeel Morris	Mumbai	3
WHIP	(United States) Dylan Spain	Mumbai	0.25
