= Mid East Falcons =

Emirati professional baseball team

Information
- League: Baseball United
- Location: Dubai, United Arab Emirates
- Ballpark: The Sevens Stadium
- Established: 2023
- League championships: 1 (2025)
- Former name: Abu Dhabi Falcons (until 2024)
- Colors: Aquamarine, teal, black and white
- General manager: Nick Swisher
- Manager: Dennis Cook

The Mid East Falcons are a professional baseball team based in Dubai, United Arab Emirates. They are one of four inaugural franchises of Baseball United, a professional baseball organization with teams based in the Middle East and South Asia.

Established as the Abu Dhabi Falcons, the team rebranded to its current name in March 2024, after Baseball United held its first "all-star" exhibition series. The Falcons debuted in Baseball United's UAE Series, an exhibition tournament held in February 2025; the team lost all three games in the series to the Arabia Wolves.

Two of the roster spots on the team's inaugural season were selected through a Tokyo Broadcasting System (TBS) reality show called Tryout: Plan D. The two winning players will be officially unveiled as members of the Mid East Falcons before their game against the Karachi Monarchs on November 19, 2025. In its inaugural season, the team will also include two active players from the Yokohama DeNA BayStars organization of Nippon Professional Baseball, playing developmental winter ball in Dubai.

In 2025, the Falcons won the inaugural United Series championship. Second baseman Munenori Kawasaki was named the most valuable player of the series.

== Draft ==
The first Baseball United Draft took place on October 23, 2023, with all four franchises making selections. The Abu Dhabi Falcons used its 4th and 5th overall selections in the first round to pick former Major League Baseball infielders Pablo Sandoval and Alex Liddi.

Round	Pick	Player	Position
1	4	Pablo Sandoval	Infielder
1	5	Alex Liddi	Infielder
2	11	Dillon Thomas	Outfielder
2	14	André Rienzo	Pitcher
3	18	Gabriel Guerrero	Outfielder
3	23	Alejandro De Aza	Outfielder
4	25	Konsta Kurikka	Pitcher
4	32	J. D. Hammer	Pitcher
5	36	Severino González	Pitcher
5	37	Rusney Castillo	Outfielder
6	43	Mitch Lively	Pitcher
6	46	Jhoan Urena	Infielder
7	50	Sam Abbott	First baseman / designated hitter
7	55	Alberto Mineo	Catcher
8	57	Mitch Piatnik	Second baseman
8	64	Leo Backstrom	Catcher / first baseman
9	68	Shungo Fukunaga	Pitcher
9	69	Luke Westphal	Pitcher
10	75	Matt Soren	Pitcher
10	78	Federico Celli	Catcher

== Roster ==
Mid East Falcons roster – 2025 Baseball United season
Players		Coaches
Pitchers: 15 (Panama) Severino González; 66 (Finland) Konsta Kurikka; 34 (Japan) Shingo Hirata; 56 (Japan) Kodai Hamaya; 9 (Palestine) Yunis Halim; 0 (Palestine) Steven Mufareh; 47 (Japan) Shōtarō Kasahara; 23 (Japan) Kazuki Yabuta; 8 (Japan) Haru Yoshioka; 22 (Japan) Shuto Sakurai	Catchers: 40 (Japan) Shotaro Usui; 36 (Canada) David Mendham; Infielders: 24 (Dominican Republic) Gregori Cano; 52 (Japan) Munenori Kawasaki; 3 (Japan) Hiroyuki Nakajima; 6 (Japan) Manato Tanai; 10 (Argentina) Pedro Agustin Figueras; Outfielders: 25 (Italy) Federico Celli; 33 (Dominican Republic) Alejandro De Aza; 17 (United States) Jake Hjelle	Manager: 27 (United States) Dennis Cook; Coaches: 14 (Panama) Rubén Rivera (bases); 50 (United States) Les Lancaster (pitching); 7 (United States) José Alvarez (bases); 20 (United States) Steve Fish (bullpen); Roster updated on 4 October 2025
