= Akshay More =

Indian baseball player (born 2003)

Saitama Seibu Lions – No. 146
- Pitcher
- Born: 4 December 2003 (age 22); Maharashtra, India
- Bats: Right Throws: Right

Akshay Balasaheb More (born 4 December 2003) is an Indian professional baseball player for the Saitama Seibu Lions of Nippon Professional Baseball (NPB). He has also played for the Mumbai Cobras of Baseball United and for the India national baseball team.

== Career ==
More studied at Lovely Professional University in Punjab, India. Aside from baseball, which he took up in his teens in 2019, he has also competed in the Indian National Judo Championships. His high school coach recommended him to Vishnu Kalel, Baseball United's baseball development manager in India, and he was included in Baseball United's 2023 All-Star Showcase in Dubai. More also played in three All India Inter University Baseball Championships, twice earning Best Pitcher honors (2023, 2025).

More signed a professional contract with the Mumbai Cobras of Baseball United, debuting as the first-ever professional Indian starting pitcher; he struck out three batters and allowed only one hit in a 9–2 victory over Karachi Monarchs. Over the course of the 2025 season, he worked to a 1.42 earned run average over 14.2 innings, with 11 strikeouts. More signed started Game 2 of the championship series for Mumbai, allowing one run over 3.1 innings four hits.

On July 27, 2026, the Lions announced the signing of More to a developmental contract, making him the first player from India to sign with a NPB organization.
