= Faisal Hayat =

Pakistani baseball player

Karachi Monarchs – No. 22
- Pitcher
- Born: 17 September 2003 (age 22); Chakkoki, Punjab, Pakistan
- Bats: Right Throws: Right

Baseball United debut
- November 15, 2025
Medals
Men's baseball
Representing Pakistan
Arab Classic
Gold medal – first place	2024 Dubai	Team

Faisal Hayat (born 17 September 2003) is a Pakistani professional baseball player who plays for the Karachi Monarchs of Baseball United, as well as the Pakistan national team. Hayat, along with fellow national team player Musharaf Khan, became the first Pakistani player to sign a professional contract when he signed with the Saga Asian Dreams, which play in the Kyushu Asia League, a Japanese independent league.

Hayat appeared with the national team at the 2024 Baseball United Arab Classic; in the game against India he pitched a shutout in Pakistan's 12–0 victory. After his performance at the Arab Classic, where Pakistan won the championship game, Hayat was feted as a hero in his hometown village. He made three appearances at the 2025 Asian Baseball Championship, working to a 9.00 earned run average over 7.0 innings pitched; he fared worst in a blow-up start against Hong Kong, allowing six runs on five hits and two walks. Against China and the Philippines, he allowed two earned runs in 6.0 innings pitched.

On September 23, 2025, the Karachi Monarchs of Baseball United announced they had signed Hayat (along with teammate Musharaf Khan) for the team's inaugural 2025 winter league season. Hayat debuted with the Monarchs on November 15 against the Mumbai Cobras, throwing two scoreless innings.
