= Jay Bell =

American baseball player and coach (born 1965)

- Shortstop / Second baseman
- Born: December 11, 1965 (age 60); Eglin, Florida, U.S.
- Batted: Right Threw: Right

MLB debut
- September 29, 1986, for the Cleveland Indians

Last MLB appearance
- September 28, 2003, for the New York Mets

MLB statistics
- Batting average: .265
- Home runs: 195
- Runs batted in: 860
- Stats at Baseball Reference

Teams
- Cleveland Indians (1986–1988); Pittsburgh Pirates (1989–1996); Kansas City Royals (1997); Arizona Diamondbacks (1998–2002); New York Mets (2003)

Career highlights and awards
- 2× All-Star (1993, 1999); World Series champion (2001); Gold Glove Award (1993); Silver Slugger Award (1993)

Jay Stuart Bell (born December 11, 1965) is an American former shortstop and coach. He played in Major League Baseball (MLB) for the Cleveland Indians (1986–1988), Pittsburgh Pirates (1989–1996), Kansas City Royals (1997), Arizona Diamondbacks (1998–2002) and the New York Mets (2003). He previously was the bench coach for the Cincinnati Reds, and was the bench coach for the New Zealand national baseball team that competed in the qualifying tournament for the 2013 World Baseball Classic.

== Playing career ==
Bell played his high school baseball at J.M. Tate High School in Cantonment, Florida. A first-round pick by the Minnesota Twins in 1984, he struggled initially, committing 129 errors over his first three minor-league seasons. The following year, he was traded to the Cleveland Indians in a deal that brought starter Bert Blyleven to the Twins.

When Bell finally made it to the majors in 1986, he faced Blyleven in his first major-league at-bat. During this moment, Bell ripped the first pitch he saw from Blyleven for a home run.

Bell maintained his reputation as one of the best shortstops in the 1990s. His range may have been considered average but he had a great knowledge of the hitters and positioned himself well. He won a Gold Glove Award in 1993, breaking a string of thirteen straight National League Gold Gloves at shortstop by Ozzie Smith. It was also the first Gold Glove by a Pirate shortstop since Gene Alley's back-to-back honors in 1966 and 1967. Though mostly a singles and doubles hitter at first, Bell was also an expert at bunting. Bell did show early signs of his power potential hitting 21 home runs in 1997 and 20 in 1998. A trial switch to second base at end of the '98 season became a permanent move the next spring. Bell belted 36 of his 38 homers from his new position, a total exceeded only by Rogers Hornsby, Davey Johnson and Ryne Sandberg among second basemen. One of those round-trippers was a sixth-inning grand slam off the Oakland Athletics pitcher Jimmy Haynes on the final game before the All-Star break, which won $1 million for an Arizona fan, Gylene Hoyle, who had correctly predicted the batter and the inning for a bases-loaded blast. Bell won the World Series with the Diamondbacks in 2001, serving as the winning run in Game 7 when he reached base on a ninth-inning bunt before Luis Gonzalez singled to deliver a walk-off series victory over the New York Yankees.

In his career, Bell batted .265, with 195 home runs, 868 runs batted in, 1,123 runs scored, 1,964 hits, 394 doubles, 67 triples and 91 stolen bases. Bell was well known for wearing eyeglasses on the baseball field.

== Coaching career ==
After the 2006 season, Bell retired as bench coach of the Arizona Diamondbacks in order to spend more time with his family, who are located in Phoenix, Arizona and Tampa, Florida. He currently has a ballfield named after him in Phoenix, called Jay Bell Field. He became eligible for the National Baseball Hall of Fame in 2009. 75% of the vote was necessary for induction, and 5% was necessary to stay on the ballot. He received 0.4% of the vote and dropped off the ballot.

Bell serves as a member of the advisory board of the Baseball Assistance Team, a 501(c)(3) non-profit organization dedicated to helping former Major League, Minor League, and Negro league players through financial and medical difficulties. In 2012, he served as the hitting coach for the Mobile BayBears, the Double–A affiliate of the Diamondbacks. Bell was hired as the hitting coach for the Pittsburgh Pirates on October 31, 2012. On November 11, 2013, Bell was named bench coach of the Cincinnati Reds. On October 22, 2015, it was announced that the Reds would not renew Bell's contract. On January 13, 2017, Bell became the manager for the High–A Tampa Yankees.

On August 29, 2017, Bell became the manager of the Scottsdale Scorpions of the Arizona Fall League. On January 25, 2018, Bell was named the manager of the Trenton Thunder, the New York Yankees' Double–A affiliate, and in 2019 he was promoted to manager of the Scranton/Wilkes-Barre RailRiders, the Yankees' Triple–A affiliate. On January 6, 2020, Bell was announced as the manager of the Rocket City Trash Pandas, the Double–A affiliate of the Los Angeles Angels, for their inaugural season. Rocket City took the place of the relocated Mobile BayBears. He left following the 2021 season.

Bell was named the manager of the Karachi Monarchs of Baseball United in the winter league's inaugural season in 2025.

== See also ==
- List of Major League Baseball career runs scored leaders
- List of Major League Baseball players with a home run in their first major league at bat
