= Kazuki Yabuta =

Japanese baseball player (born 1992)

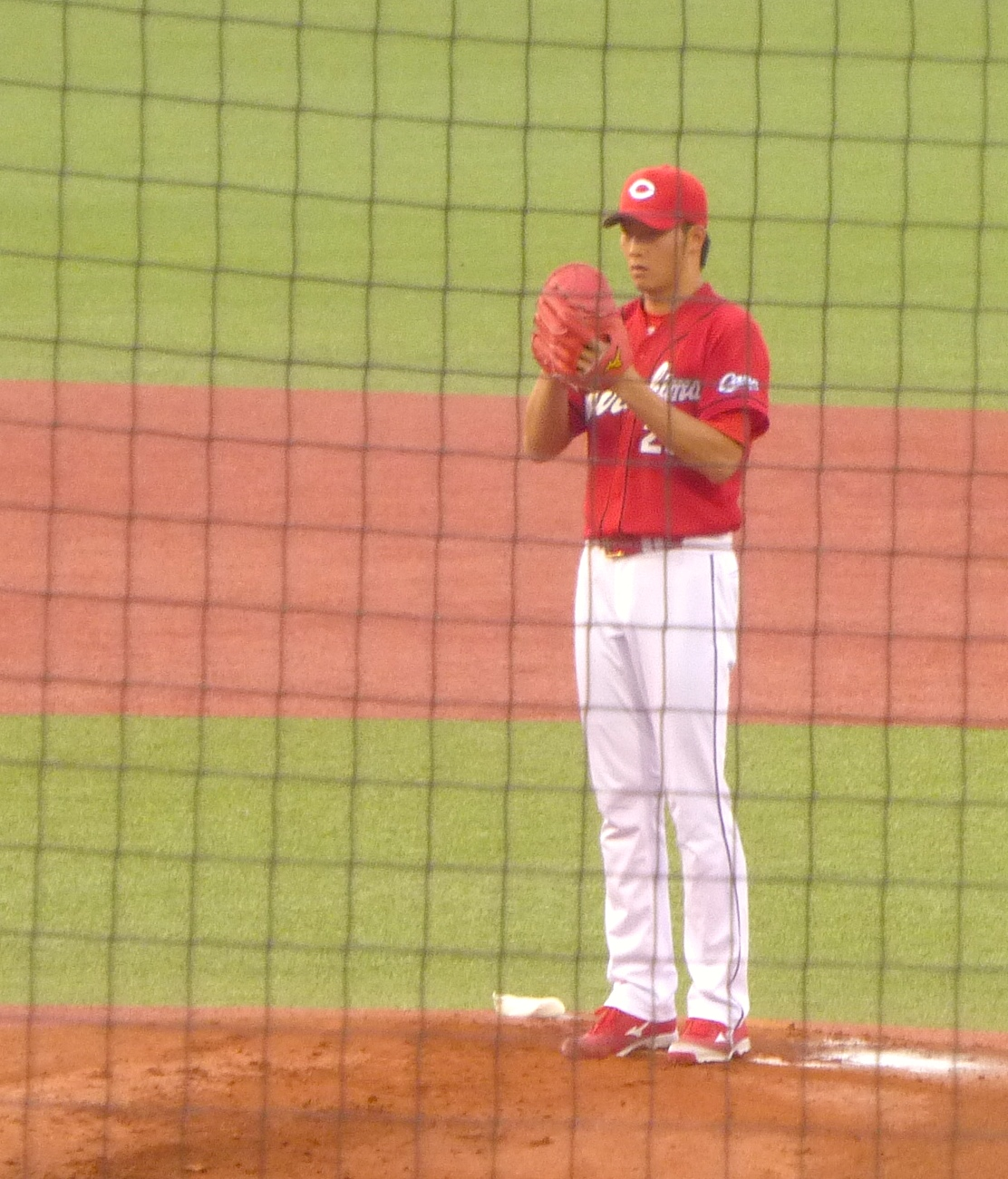
- Yabuta with the Hiroshima Toyo Carp

Free agent
- Pitcher
- Born: August 7, 1992 (age 34); Hiroshima, Hiroshima, Japan
- Bats: Right Throws: Right

NPB debut
- July 1, 2015, for the Hiroshima Toyo Carp

NPB statistics (through 2023 season)
- Win–loss record: 23–11
- Earned run average: 3.94
- Strikeouts: 231
- Stats at Baseball Reference

Teams
- Hiroshima Toyo Carp (2015–2023)

Kazuki Yabuta (薮田 和樹, Yabuta Kazuki; born August 7, 1992) is a professional Japanese baseball pitcher who is a free agent. He has previously played in Nippon Professional Baseball (NPB) for the Hiroshima Toyo Carp.

== Career ==
=== Hiroshima Toyo Carp ===
Yabuta played for the Hiroshima Toyo Carp from 2015 to 2023. In 9 seasons for the Carp, he pitched to a 23–11 record and 3.94 ERA with 231 strikeouts in 304 total innings of work across 123 games. He was released by the team following the 2023 season.

=== Oisix Niigata Albirex ===
Yabuta played for Oisix Niigata Albirex BC of the Eastern League from 2024 to 2025. In two seasons (49 total appearances), he pitched to a 7–19 record with a 4.10 ERA and 141 strikeouts over 263 innings pitched.

=== Mid East Falcons ===
Yabuta signed with the Mid East Falcons of Baseball United for the 2025 season. In a game against the Karachi Monarchs on November 20, 2025, he threw five scoreless innings and was part of a Combined no-hitter. The Falcons later went on to win the inaugural United Series championship, and Yabuta received the Mariano Rivera Best Pitcher Award following the season.

=== Saraperos de Saltillo ===
On February 14, 2026, Yabuta signed with the Saraperos de Saltillo of the Mexican League. In 19 relief appearances for the Saraperos, he posted an 0–2 record with a 6.35 ERA, 24 strikeouts, and 12 walks across 22 2/3 innings pitched. On July 9, Yabuta was released by Saltillo.
