= Mumbai Cobras =

Indian professional baseball team

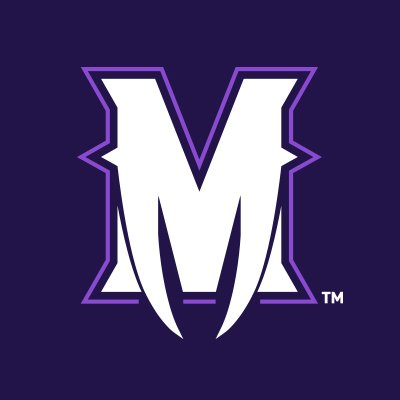
- Cap insignia

Information
- League: Baseball United
- Location: Dubai, United Arab Emirates (representing Mumbai)
- Ballpark: Baseball United Ballpark
- Founded: 2023
- Colours: Purple, White
- General manager: Barry Larkin
- Manager: Mariano Duncan
- Website: www.mumbaicobras.com

The Mumbai Cobras are a professional baseball club that is a member of Baseball United. Founded in 2023, the team represents Mumbai, India, and plays its games at the Baseball United Ballpark at The Sevens in Dubai.

== History ==
The Mumbai Cobras were announced on 15 May 2023, as the first of four franchises revealed by the league. They were later awarded the first pick in the inaugural Baseball United draft, which they used to select Karan Patel. The Cobras selected 20 players during the 2023 Baseball United Draft, some of whom previously played in Major League Baseball. Players selected included Andrelton Simmons, Akeem Bostick, and Tiago da Silva.

Before the inaugural Baseball United season in 2025, Mumbai announced it had signed six players of Indian descent to professional contracts: three Indian Americans (pitcher Karan Patel and infielders Raul Shah and Aaron Singh) as well as three native Indians (pitchers Akshay More, Saurabh Gaikwad, and Tushar Lalwani). The team also signed Lord de Vera and Ian Mercado, the first known Filipino players to play professional baseball since Claudio Manela, who debuted in 1921 for the Cincinnati Cuban Stars in the first Negro National League.

The Cobras debuted on November 14, 2025, the first game of the league's inaugural 2025 season, in a 4–6 loss to Karachi; Karan Patel was the starting pitcher. Nevertheless, the team became the first in the league to clinch a spot in the championship series.

== Roster ==
Mumbai Cobras roster – 2025 Baseball United season
Players		Coaches
Pitchers: 22 (United States) Brandon Kaminer; 16 (Venezuela) Nyan Hernández; 18 (India) Saurabh Gaikwad; 20 (United States) Karan Patel; 23 (United States) Brock Bell; 24 (United States) Chandler Woolridge; 28 (United States) Chase Gearing; 32 (United States) Jacob Hasty; 36 (United States) Dylan Spain; 49 (United States Virgin Islands) Akeel Morris; 68 (India) Tushar Lalwani; 92 (India) Akshay More	Catchers: 15 (Costa Rica) Manuel Ascanio; 7 (Mexico) Miguel Ojeda Jr.; Infielders: 1 (Curaçao) Gedionne Marlin; 4 (United Kingdom) Raul Shah; 6 (United States) Aaron Singh; 10 (Sweden) Victor Vahlberg; 11 (Philippines) Lord de Vera; 33 (United States) Brantley Bell; Outfielders: 9 (Philippines) Ian Mercado; 13 (United States) Justin Williams; 17 (United States) Caleb McNeely; 34 (Germany) Lou Helmig	Manager: 25 (Dominican Republic) Mariano Duncan; Coaches: 9 (Mexico) Ever Magallanes (first base); 12 (Aruba) Calvin Maduro (pitching); 14 (Dominican Republic) César Martín (third base); 45 (United States) Vince Sagisi (bullpen); Rosterupdated on 30 September 2025
