= Hiroyuki Nakajima =

Japanese baseball player (born 1982)

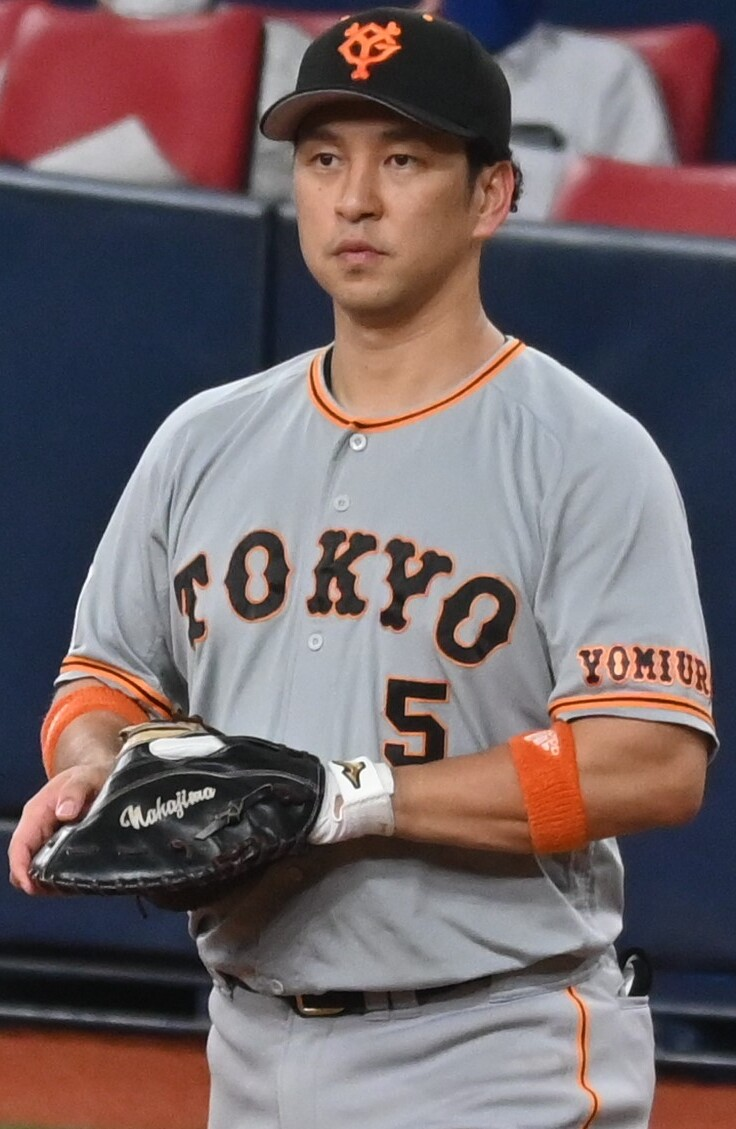
- Nakajima with the Yomiuri Giants in 2021

Free agent
- Infielder
- Born: July 31, 1982 (age 44); Itami, Hyōgo, Japan
- Batted: Right-handed Threw: Right

NPB debut
- October 6, 2002, for the Seibu Lions

Last NPB appearance
- July 28, 2024, for the Chunichi Dragons

NPB statistics
- Batting average: .292
- Hits: 1,928
- Home runs: 209
- Runs batted in: 995
- Stolen bases: 144
- Stats at Baseball Reference

Teams
- Seibu Lions / Saitama Seibu Lions (2001–2012); Orix Buffaloes (2015–2018); Yomiuri Giants (2019–2023); Chunichi Dragons (2024)

Career highlights and awards
- 8× NPB All-Star (2004, 2006–2012); 4× Best Nine Award winner (2008, 2009, 2011, 2012); 2× Japan Series champion (2004, 2008); 3× Golden Glove Award winner (2008, 2011, 2012)
Medals
Representing Japan
Men's Baseball
World Baseball Classic
Gold medal – first place	2009 Los Angeles	Team

Hiroyuki Nakajima (中島 裕之, Nakajima Hiroyuki; born July 31, 1982), nicknamed "Nakaji", is a Japanese professional baseball infielder for the Mid East Falcons of Baseball United. He played in Nippon Professional Baseball (NPB) for the Saitama Seibu Lions, Orix Buffaloes, Yomiuri Giants, and Chunichi Dragons.

Nakajima played for the Japanese national team in the 2008 Beijing Olympics and the 2009 World Baseball Classic. After the 2011 season, the Lions posted Nakajima to Major League Baseball, but Nakajima failed to reach an agreement with the New York Yankees. After the 2012 season, he signed a two-year contract with the Athletics. After spending two years in Minor League Baseball, Nakajima returned to Japan with Buffaloes in 2015. He played for them through 2018, before joining the Giants.

== Early life ==
Nakajima was born in Itami, a city in Hyōgo, Japan. He was a pitcher during his days at Itami Municipal Sakuradai Elementary School, playing in a national tournament alongside batterymate Katsuki Yamazaki (who would become a catcher for the rival Fukuoka SoftBank Hawks a decade later). He played for Takarazuka Senior while attending Itami Municipal Tennōjigawa Junior High School, receiving offers to play for high school baseball powerhouses in other prefectures by coaches who came to see him play.

Nakajima opted to apply to the prestigious Hōtoku Gakuen High School within the prefecture but was rejected and ended up enrolling in Itami Kita Senior High School, a local school and a complete unknown in high school baseball. He worked his way into the starting lineup in his first year (the equivalent of tenth grade in the United States), playing right field that summer and becoming the team's leadoff hitter by his second.

Nakajima hit 43 home runs out of the leadoff spot in his high school career and took the mound as the team's ace pitcher in his last two years, but his team never came particularly close to making a national tournament, losing in the fourth round of the Hyōgo Tournament in the last summer of Nakajima's high school career. However, despite such relative anonymity, Nakajima was picked by the Seibu Lions in the fifth round of the 2000 NPB amateur draft. He was the 57th overall pick (out of 86 players) in that year's draft.

== Professional career ==
=== Seibu Lions / Saitama Seibu Lions ===
Nakajima struggled mightily in his rookie season (2001). He recorded seven errors at shortstop, a position he rarely played in high school, and hit just .105 (2-for-19) in 30 games with the Lions' nigun team (Japanese for "minor league" or "farm team").

He made substantial improvements in his second season (2002), winning the starting shortstop job at the nigun level and becoming the only player in the league to play all 90 games. He led the Eastern League in hits, runs scored, sacrifice flies and hit-batters and came second in batting average (.299) and fourth in runs batted in (47), hitting 11 home runs to top it off. However, he also grounded into 10 double plays and committed 25 errors, leading the league in both categories. He was called up to the ichigun ("major league") team for the first time towards the end of the season, making his professional debut at the level in a game against the Nippon-Ham Fighters on October 6 as the designated hitter and getting his first career hit off right-hander Satoru Kanemura in the same game.

Nakajima hit a team-high .306 with 13 home runs for the Lions' nigun team in 2003. He played 44 games at the ichigun level, hitting his first career home run off then-Fukuoka Daiei Hawks Hayato Terahara on August 5 and recording his first career stolen base on August 12 against the Osaka Kintetsu Buffaloes. He finished the year with a .258 batting average, four homers and 11 RBI, and was given the uniform number 3 during the off-season as a testament to the organization's hopes that he would become the successor to former shortstop and franchise player Kazuo Matsui, who left for the New York Mets via free agency.

The 2004 season proved to be a breakout year for Nakajima, earning a spot in the starting lineup as the No. 7 hitter for the ichigun team's season opener. Manager Tsutomu Ito continued to start him despite criticism that he wasn't ready to be the starting shortstop, and Nakajima lived up to expectations by hitting over .300 until May and finishing the year with a .287 batting average, 27 home runs, 90 RBI and 18 stolen bases, contributing to the Lions' league title and Japan Series championship. Nakajima was the only player in the Pacific League to play all 133 games without missing an inning. He was also voted to the Pacific League All-Star team by the managers and coaches.

On May 7 2005, in an interleague game against the Hiroshima Toyo Carp, Nakajima took a grounder that took a bad hop to the face, breaking his cheekbone and missing a significant amount of playing time. While he still finished the season with enough plate appearances to qualify for the batting title, he hit just .274 with 11 home runs and 11 stolen bases, grounding into 17 double plays (third in the Pacific League) and committing 10 errors (more than any other shortstop in the league).

Rebounding from a disappointing 2005 campaign, Nakajima led all players with a .390 batting average in interleague play in 2006 and was chosen to the All-Star team for the second time in his career. However, he was hit by a pitch by Tohoku Rakuten Golden Eagles right-hander Hiroki Yamamura on July 30, breaking the fourth metacarpal bone in his left hand. After returning to the team on September 12, Nakajima hit well, even ranking among the league leaders in batting average for a short span of time (he finished the season with a .306 average, fourth-highest in the league). However, he left much to be desired with his glovework, leading all Pacific League shortstops in errors (16) for the second straight year.

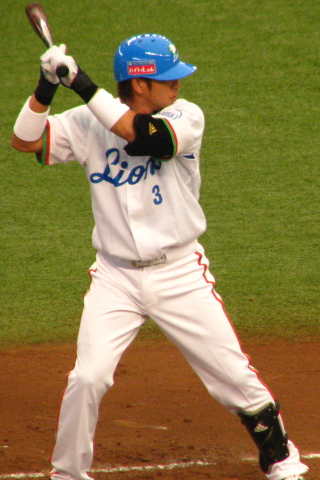
Nakajima batting in 2009

Nakajima was promoted to the 3-hole in the batting lineup for the 2007, playing in his third All-Star Game and finishing among the league leaders in average (.300, fifth in the Pacific League) and hits (160, third) with 74 RBI. He was also the only player in either of the leagues to record an RBI in nine straight games. On the other hand, his 134 strikeouts were more than those in his previous two seasons combined (67 and 66 in 2005 and 2006, respectively) and his 20 errors led all Pacific League shortstops for the third consecutive season.

The 2008 season brought Nakajima his first stint with the Japanese national team as he was chosen to play in the 2008 Beijing Olympics. He hit .343 and led the league in batting average in the first half of the season, playing in the All-Star Game for the fourth time of his career (though he was relegated to third base due to the selections of shortstops Munenori Kawasaki of the Hawks and Tsuyoshi Nishioka of the Chiba Lotte Marines and committed an error on a bad throw) and even seeing time as the team's cleanup hitter when teammates and resident power hitters Craig Brazell and G.G. Sato were slumping.

While his batting average dipped after returning to Japan following the Olympics, Nakajima hit .331 for the season, finishing second to Eagles outfielder Rick Short, who won the batting title by a mere .0007 points. He hit 21 home runs and recorded career highs in on-base percentage (.410, leading the league), slugging percentage (.527), walks (55) and stolen bases (25). Nakajima also made improvements with his glove, cutting his errors to 12 and winning his first Golden Glove award. He was chosen to the Best Nine that year and even prompted many sportswriters to name him the league Most Valuable Player (though the award eventually went to Eagles ace Hisashi Iwakuma, who went 21–4 with a 1.87 ERA).

Coming off of the 2009 World Baseball Classic, Nakajima had a somewhat quiet start to the regular season, hitting .292 with 14 RBIs in the month of April but failing to hit a single home run.

At the conclusion of the 2011 season, Nakajima was posted to Major League Baseball. The New York Yankees won the posting with a $2 million bid. Nakajima and the Yankees failed to reach an agreement on a contract, and Nakajima remained with Seibu.

=== Oakland Athletics ===
On December 17, 2012, Nakajima signed a two-year contract worth $6.5 million with the Oakland Athletics.

As of March 25, 2013, Nakajima was batting only .150 with one double and one RBI in spring training, and John Shea of the San Francisco Chronicle correctly predicted that he would be sent down to the minor leagues. Nakajima was placed on the 15-day disabled list, retroactive to March 27, and was sent to the Sacramento River Cats, the Athletics' Triple-A affiliate. On August 17, Nakajima was designated for assignment, removing him from the Athletics' 40 man roster. He spent the entire 2013 season in Sacramento, batting .283 in 90 games.

Nakajima also started the 2014 season in the minor leagues. Some commentators speculated that Nakajima would need to improve his defense, e.g., learning how to move faster toward the ball on MLB's grass infields and being more aggressive around the bag, before his play was up to Major League standards.

=== Orix Buffaloes ===
In December 2014, Nakajima announced that he had reached a three-year agreement with the Orix Buffaloes, citing frustration at not being able to make the Athletics' major league roster as the reason for wanting to return to Japan. It was reported that the deal is worth 1.2 billion yen, with being able to join his high school teammate Yamazaki also considered as a factor in his decision to join the Buffaloes. He played for Orix through 2018.

=== Yomiuri Giants ===
On November 12, 2018, Nakajima signed with the Yomiuri Giants. He played in 43 games for the team in 2019, hitting .148/.277/.278 with one home run, five RBI, and one stolen base. Nakajima made 100 appearances for Yomiuri in 2020, slashing .297/.369/.419 with seven home runs and 29 RBI.

Nakajima played in 81 contests for the Giants during the 2021 campaign, hitting .271/.314/.425 with six home runs and 26 RBI. He made 62 appearances for Yomiuri in 2022, batting .242/.315/.333 with one home run and 20 RBI. In 2023, Nakajima played in eight games for the Giants, going 5-for-18 (.278) with one walk. He became a free agent following the season.

=== Chunichi Dragons ===
On November 15, 2023, Nakajima signed with the Chunichi Dragons. In 15 games for the team in 2024, he went 0–for–13 with 1 RBI. On October 8, 2024, it was announced Nakajima had been released by the team.

On March 27, 2025, Nakajima announced his retirement from professional baseball after receiving no contract offers from NPB teams.

=== Mid East Falcons ===
In October 2025, Nakajima signed with the Mid East Falcons of Baseball United.

== International career ==
=== 2008 Beijing Olympics ===
Chosen to the Japanese national team for the first time in the 2008 Beijing Olympics, Nakajima was expected to platoon at third base with veteran Shinya Miyamoto as a result of fellow middle infielders Munenori Kawasaki and Tsuyoshi Nishioka (who both had better defensive reputations than Nakajima) being chosen, but ended up playing at his natural position from the second game onwards due to Kawasaki's injury in the first game of the tournament against Cuba. Nakajima played in all nine games, hitting .296 and driving in five runs out of both the 9- and 3-hole, but Japan lost in the semi-finals against South Korea on August 22 and dropped the bronze medal match against the United States on August 23 in a disappointing fourth-place finish behind South Korea, Cuba and the United States.

=== 2009 World Baseball Classic ===
Nakajima played in the second World Baseball Classic as a member of the national team, batting second behind leadoff man and current New York Yankees outfielder Ichiro Suzuki. He went 3-for-4 with a pair of doubles and two RBI in Japan's 14–2 rout of South Korea in the first round on March 7 and 2-for-5 with two doubles and two RBI in Japan's 9–4 win over the United States in the semi-finals. Though he missed two games due to a high fever in the second round that was held in San Diego, he played an instrumental role in Japan's championship run, hitting .364 with a .516 on-base percentage (leading all hitters on the Japanese team with 20 or more plate appearances) and driving in seven runs.

== Personal life ==
In September 2015, Nakajima welcomed his first child, a daughter, with model Sayo Aizawa. Later that same month, the couple got married.

In February 2018, his wife gave birth to their second child, a son.

== Playing style ==
=== Hitting ===
Listed at 5 feet 11 inches (1.80 m) and 200 pounds (91 kg), Nakajima has a combination of speed and power that is rare among Japanese players. He is easily recognizable by his distinct batting stance in which he holds the bat high above his head, much like the jōdan no kamae seen in Kendo (a Japanese martial art). The No. 3 hitter in the Lions lineup, Nakajima is an aggressive hitter who likes to swing early in the count, drawing few walks (though he has improved in this regard in the last few seasons) but often being hit by pitches. He is a spray hitter with moderate power and good speed on the basepaths.

=== Fielding ===
Although he has occasionally manned third base during his professional career, Nakajima's primary position for the Lions was shortstop. While he has been known to be somewhat sloppy at times, particularly on the throwing end, he has made strides in his glovework and won the Golden Glove award at shortstop for the first time in 2008. In 2012, one major league executive told Ken Rosenthal of Fox Sports that Nakajima's range at shortstop is average "at best", and a different evaluator told Buster Olney of ESPN that he is not an everyday player.
