= Severino González =

Panamanian baseball player (born 1992)

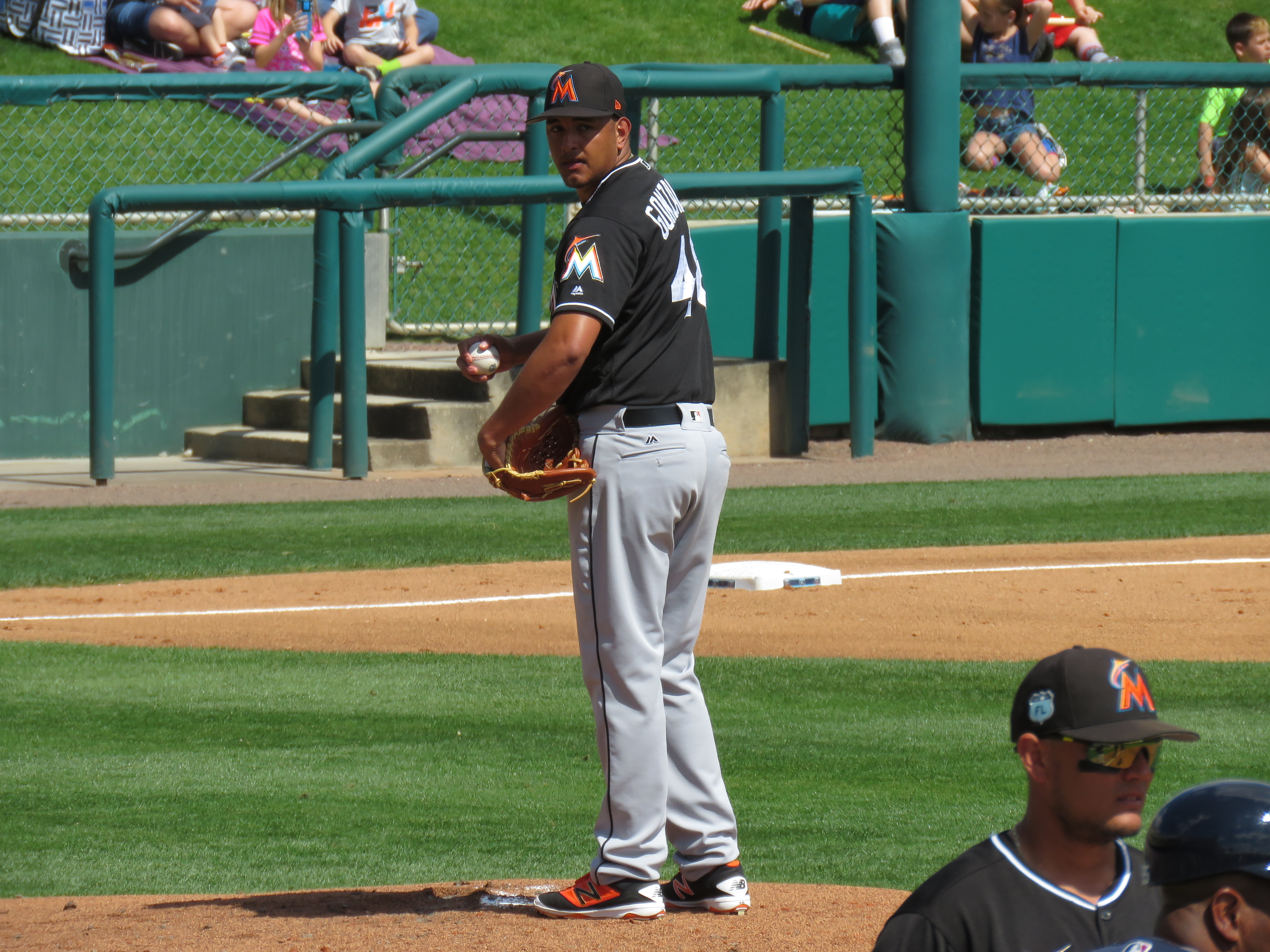
- González with the Miami Marlins in 2017

Free agent
- Pitcher
- Born: September 28, 1992 (age 33); Santiago de Veraguas, Veraguas, Panama
- Bats: Right Throws: Right

MLB debut
- April 28, 2015, for the Philadelphia Phillies

MLB statistics (through 2016 season)
- Win–loss record: 4–5
- Earned run average: 6.68
- Strikeouts: 62
- Stats at Baseball Reference

Teams
- Philadelphia Phillies (2015–2016)

Severino Yunier González (born September 28, 1992) is a Panamanian professional baseball pitcher for Veraguas of Panama's Campeonato Nacional de Béisbol Mayor. He has previously played in Major League Baseball (MLB) for the Philadelphia Phillies.

== Baseball career ==
=== Philadelphia Phillies ===
González signed with the Philadelphia Phillies as an international free agent on April 27, 2011.

Playing for the Double–A Reading Fightin Phils in 2013, González had a 2.00 earned run average with 119 strikeouts over 103 2/3 innings pitched. After the season, he won the Paul Owens Award as the Phillies Minor League Pitcher of the Year.

González made his major league debut on April 28, 2015, against the St. Louis Cardinals. González appeared in 27 games for Philadelphia in 2016, registering a 5.60 ERA with 34 strikeouts in 35 1/3 innings pitched.

On January 19, 2017, González was designated for assignment by the Phillies following the signing of Michael Saunders.

=== Miami Marlins ===
On January 24, 2017, González was traded to the Miami Marlins in exchange for cash or a player to be named later.

On February 17, 2018, González removed from the 40–man roster and sent outright to the Triple–A New Orleans Baby Cakes. His contract was selected by the Marlins on April 1. The following day, González was designated for assignment. González again cleared waivers and was sent outright to New Orleans on April 4. He was released by the organization on June 18.

=== Saraperos de Saltillo ===
On July 7, 2018, González signed with the Saraperos de Saltillo of the Mexican League. In 3 games (2 starts) for Saltillo, he struggled to an 0–2 record and 23.14 ERA with 5 strikeouts across 4 2/3 innings pitched.

In 2019, González was selected for Panama national baseball team at the 2019 Pan American Games Qualifier. After the 2020 season, he played for Panama in the 2021 Caribbean Series.

=== Guerreros de Oaxaca ===
On June 5, 2022, González signed with the Guerreros de Oaxaca of the Mexican League. In 12 games for Oaxaca, he compiled a 6.00 ERA with 11 strikeouts across 12 innings pitched. González was released by the Guerreros on July 3.

=== Charros de Jalisco ===
On May 22, 2024, González signed with the Charros de Jalisco of the Mexican League. In 25 appearances for Jalisco, he logged a 2–2 record and 3.91 ERA with 13 strikeouts over 23 innings pitched.

González made seven appearances for Jalisco in 2025, struggling to a 9.72 ERA with seven strikeouts across 8 1/3 innings pitched. He was released by the Charros on May 13, 2025.

=== Mid East Falcons ===
In October 2025, González signed with the Mid East Falcons of Baseball United. In eight appearances with the club in its inaugural 2025 season, he pitched a scoreless 7.1 innings, notching two saves.

=== Veraguas ===
González played for Veraguas of Panama's Campeonato Nacional de Béisbol Mayor in 2026.

== International career ==
González was selected to represent Panama at the 2023 World Baseball Classic qualification, the 2023 World Baseball Classic and the 2026 World Baseball Classic. He was also part of the squad that represented Panama at the 2023 Pan American Games held in Santiago, Chile, where he led the tournament in saves.
