= Dennis Cook =

American baseball player (born 1962)

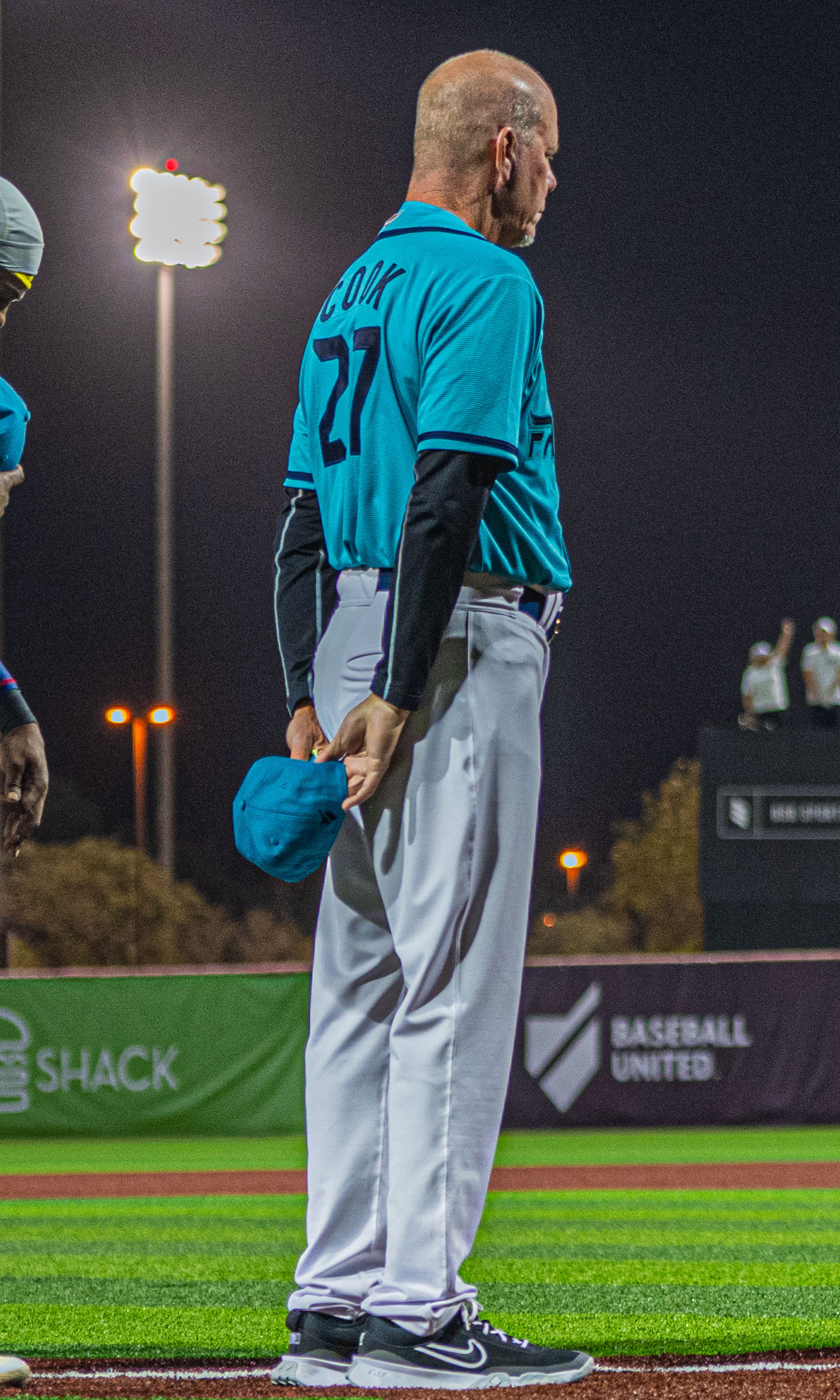
- Cook with the Mid East Falcons in 2025
- Pitcher
- Born: October 4, 1962 (age 63); La Marque, Texas, U.S.
- Batted: Left Threw: Left

MLB debut
- September 12, 1988, for the San Francisco Giants

Last MLB appearance
- September 18, 2002, for the Anaheim Angels

MLB statistics
- Win–loss record: 64–46
- Earned run average: 3.91
- Strikeouts: 739
- Stats at Baseball Reference

Teams
- San Francisco Giants (1988–1989); Philadelphia Phillies (1989–1990); Los Angeles Dodgers (1990–1991); Cleveland Indians (1992–1993); Chicago White Sox (1994); Cleveland Indians (1995); Texas Rangers (1995–1996); Florida Marlins (1997); New York Mets (1998–2001); Philadelphia Phillies (2001); Anaheim Angels (2002)

Career highlights and awards
- World Series champion (1997)

Dennis Bryan Cook (born October 4, 1962) is an American former professional baseball pitcher who played in Major League Baseball (MLB) between 1988 and 2002 for nine different teams. His longest tenure was three seasons and part of a fourth with the New York Mets. He was a member of the championship 1997 Florida Marlins team.

Following his playing career, Cook managed the Sweden and Poland national baseball teams as well as collegiate summer teams

== Playing career ==
Cook graduated from Dickinson High School in 1981. In college, Cook was named to the All-Southwest Conference team as an outfielder at the University of Texas in both 1984 and 1985.

Cook was a member of the 1997 World Series champion Florida Marlins. He was the winning pitcher in relief in Game 3.

Although not on the postseason roster, Cook was a member of the 2002 Angels team that won the World Series, defeating the San Francisco Giants.

Cook was a good hitter, and he is number two on the list of MLB all-time best-hitting pitchers between 1973 and 2003 (with 100 or more at-bats). In 1990, he batted .306 (15-for-49), and only struck out four times in 53 plate appearances. His career batting average was .264 and he had two career home runs.

Throughout Cook's tenure with the Marlins and New York Mets, Atlanta Braves first base coach Pat Corrales and he had a long-running conflict over Corrales's allegations that Cook scuffed the seams of the baseball with his thumbnail. Corrales asked umpires to inspect the baseball during almost every game, sometimes multiple times per game, that Cook pitched against the Braves. This once led Cook to stand on the mound and scream at Corrales in the first base coach's box during a 1997 Braves–Marlins game.

== Coaching career ==
On February 1, 2010, Cook was announced as the Sweden national baseball team's new head coach, with Scott Scudder in the coaching staff.

In 2018, Cook became the pitching coach for the Chatham Anglers of the Cape Cod Baseball League.

In October 2023, Cook was named manager of the Mid East Falcons of Baseball United.

Cook was named manager of the Poland national team in April 2024. as part of a broader effort to strengthen the country’s long-term competitiveness in European and international competition. As manager, he emphasized player evaluation, instructional development, and the implementation of professional training standards, drawing on his experience in MLB. His work with Poland has focused on building foundational structure and long-term growth for the national program. Poland finished second in a 2025 European Baseball Championship qualifier, not advancing to the continental tournament.

In 2025, Cook became Chatham's manager and Sweden's pitching coach. He also led Mid East to the first Baseball United championship.
