= Mariano Duncan =

Dominican baseball player (born 1963)

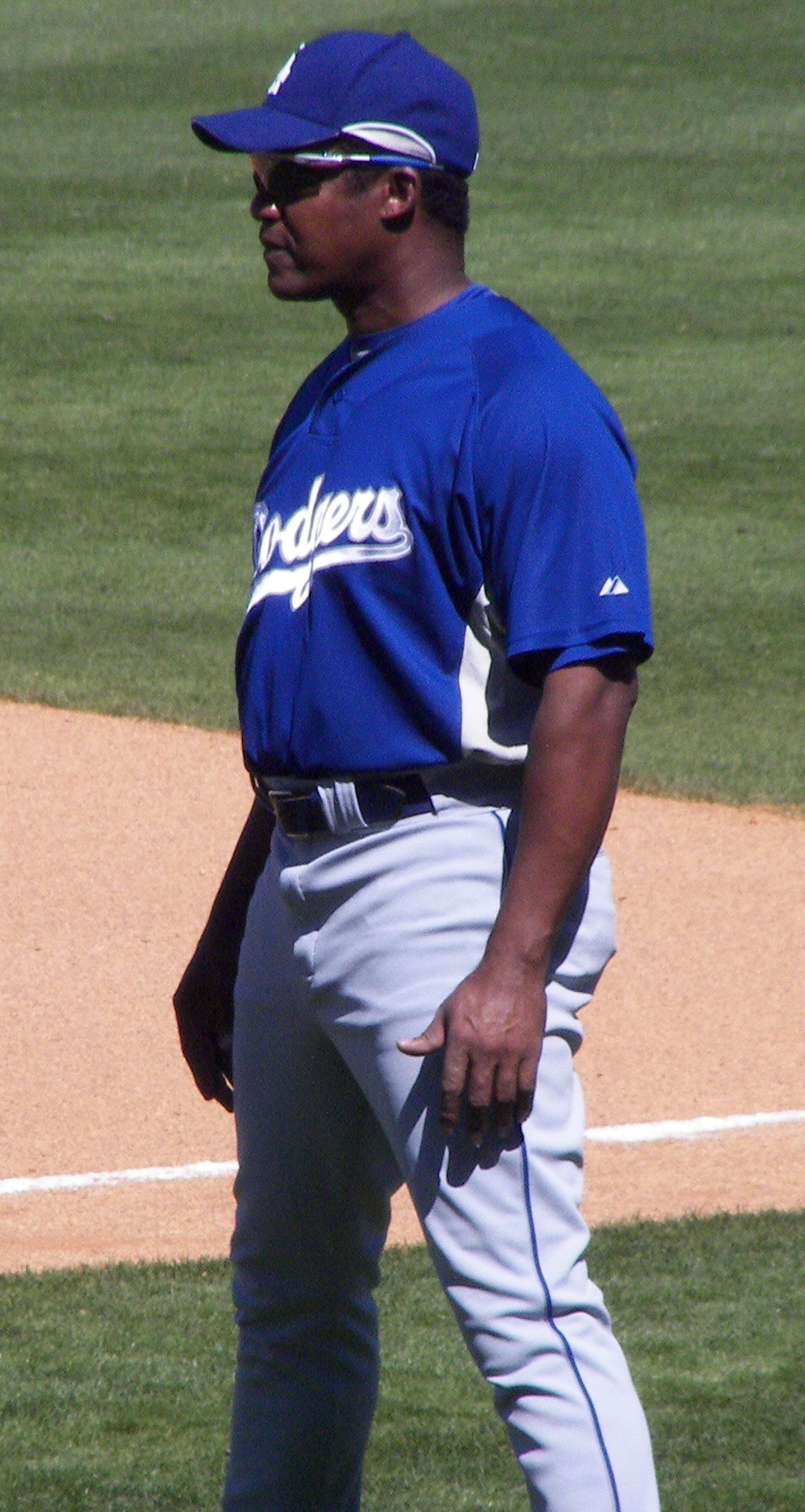
- Duncan with the Los Angeles Dodgers in 2007
- Second baseman / Shortstop
- Born: March 13, 1963 (age 63); San Pedro de Macorís, Dominican Republic
- Batted: Right (Note: Duncan batted as a switch hitter between 1985 and 1987.) Threw: Right

Professional debut
- MLB: April 9, 1985, for the Los Angeles Dodgers
- NPB: April 3, 1998, for the Yomiuri Giants

Last appearance
- MLB: September 17, 1997, for the Toronto Blue Jays
- NPB: September 17, 1998, for the Yomiuri Giants

MLB statistics
- Batting average: .267
- Home runs: 87
- Runs batted in: 491

NPB statistics
- Batting average: .232
- Home runs: 10
- Runs batted in: 34
- Stats at Baseball Reference

Teams
- As player: Los Angeles Dodgers (1985–1987, 1989); Cincinnati Reds (1989–1991); Philadelphia Phillies (1992–1995); Cincinnati Reds (1995); New York Yankees (1996–1997); Toronto Blue Jays (1997); Yomiuri Giants (1998); As coach: Los Angeles Dodgers (2006–2010)

Career highlights and awards
- All-Star (1994); 2× World Series champion (1990, 1996)

Mariano Duncan Nalasco (born March 13, 1963) is a Dominican former second baseman and shortstop who played for the Los Angeles Dodgers, Cincinnati Reds, Philadelphia Phillies, New York Yankees, and Toronto Blue Jays of Major League Baseball and the Yomiuri Giants of Nippon Professional Baseball during his 12-year career. He was the infield coach and first base coach for the Los Angeles Dodgers under managers Grady Little and Joe Torre. Duncan was an MLB All-Star in 1994 and won two World Series championships as a player. He is currently manager of the Mumbai Cobras of Baseball United.

== Playing career ==
=== Los Angeles Dodgers ===
Duncan was signed by the Los Angeles Dodgers as an undrafted free agent on January 7, 1982. He played in the Dodgers minor league system for three seasons with the Lethbridge Dodgers in 1982, Vero Beach Dodgers in 1983 and San Antonio Dodgers in 1984. He stole 56 bases for Vero Beach and 41 bases for San Antonio, and at San Antonio he tied Stu Pederson for the league lead in triples. He made his major league debut, starting at second base, for the Dodgers on April 9, 1985 against the Houston Astros, and was 0 for 4 in his debut. He got his first major league hit on April 10 against Astros pitcher Joe Niekro.

In his rookie season, July 6, 1985, vs. St. Louis Cardinals, Duncan accomplished the rare feat of bunting for a double where the ball was untouched and did not roll beyond the base paths. The Dodgers won the game 8-3.

He stole 38 bases in his rookie season and finished third in the rookie of the year voting.

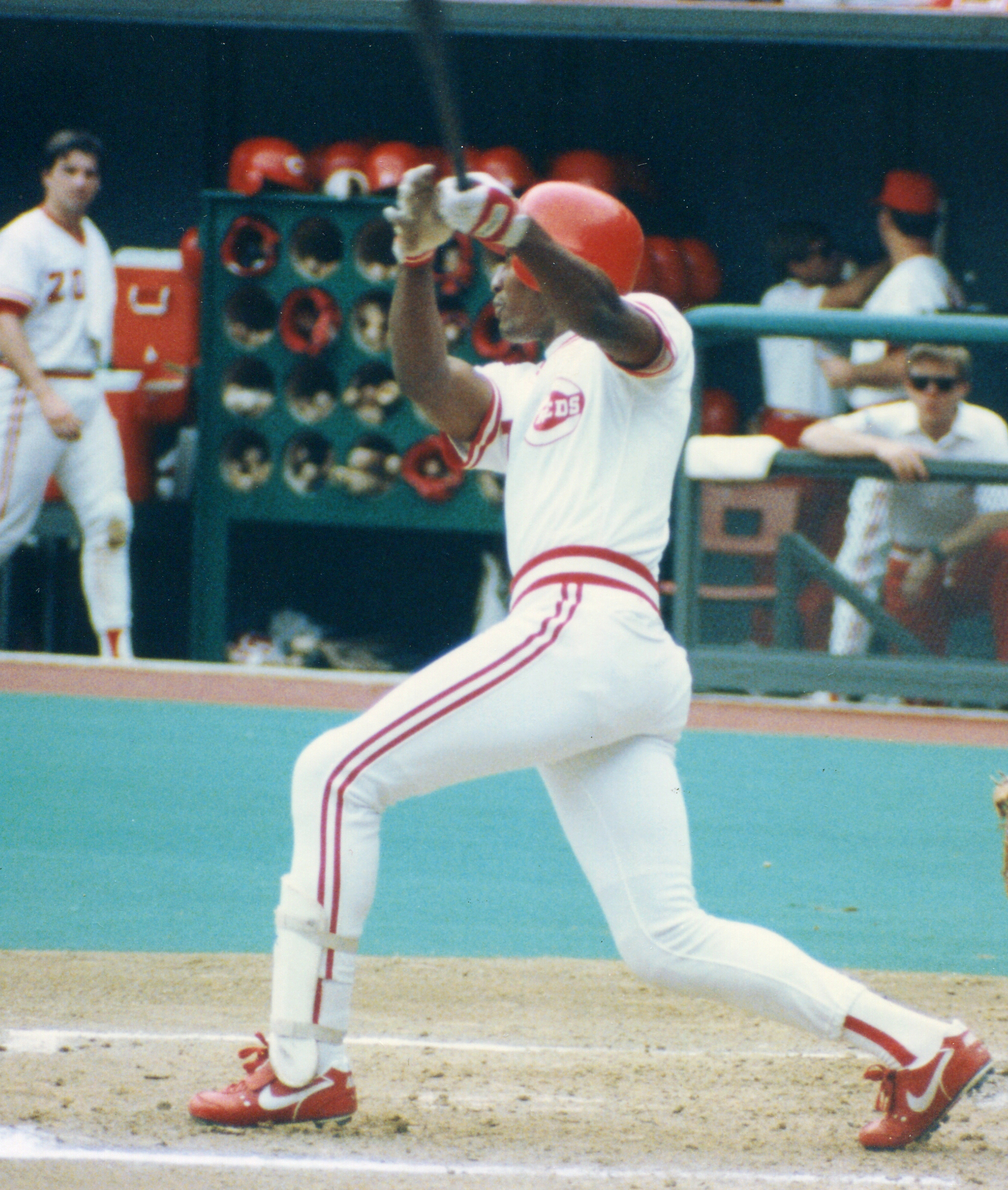
Duncan playing for Cincinnati in 1990

=== Cincinnati Reds ===
Duncan was traded by the Dodgers to the Cincinnati Reds with Tim Leary on July 18, 1989 for Lenny Harris and Kal Daniels. Duncan would go on to win a title with the 1990 World Champion Cincinnati Reds which included the Nasty Boys.

=== Philadelphia Phillies ===
Duncan signed with the Philadelphia Phillies on April 14, 1992. He played three seasons for the Phils before being claimed off waivers by the Reds on August 8, 1995.

=== New York Yankees ===
On December 11, 1995, Duncan signed with the New York Yankees, and he spent a season and a half in New York. In his only full season in 1996, he hit .340 with 56 runs batted in.

Duncan coined the phrase, "we play today, we win today... das it!" which became the mantra for the 1996 World Series champion New York Yankees. Many of the players wore T-shirts with the slogan under their uniforms daily.

In 1997, he played in 50 games, hitting just .244 with 13 runs batted in. On July 6, 1997, Duncan and Kenny Rogers were traded to the San Diego Padres for Greg Vaughn and two minor league players. The deal was voided days later due to Vaughn failing his physical.

=== Toronto Blue Jays ===
Duncan was traded to the Toronto Blue Jays on July 29, 1997, for minor leaguer Angel Ramirez. He spent a half of the season with the Blue Jays.

=== Yomiuri Giants ===
Duncan played one season for the Yomiuri Giants in 1998.

=== Career statistics ===
In 1279 games over 12 seasons, Duncan compiled a .267 batting average (1247-for-4677) with 619 runs, 233 doubles, 37 triples, 87 home runs, 491 RBI, 174 stolen bases, 201 walks, 913 strikeouts, .300 on-base percentage and .388 slugging percentage. Defensively, he recorded a .963 fielding percentage, primarily at second base and shortstop. In 43 postseason games (3 World Series, 7 playoff series) he batted .243 (37-for-152) with 14 runs, 1 home run, 12 RBI and 7 stolen bases.

== Highlights ==
- Member of the Reds' 1990 World Champion team, the Phillies' 1993 National League Champion team, and the Yankees' 1996 World Champion team.

== Coaching career ==
- 2003: Gulf Coast Dodgers
- 2004: Jacksonville Suns
- 2005: Las Vegas 51s
- 2006–2010: Los Angeles Dodgers
- 2011–2012: Tennessee Smokies
- 2013–2014: Daytona Cubs
- 2015–2016, 2018: Myrtle Beach Pelicans
- 2017: Iowa Cubs
- 2018: West Michigan Whitecaps
- 2019: Kingsport Mets
- 2020: Columbia Fireflies (Season Cancelled)
- 2021: Brooklyn Cyclones
- 2022: Binghamton Rumble Ponies
- 2025: Mumbai Cobras
- 2026: Binghamton Rumble Ponies

== See also ==
- List of Major League Baseball annual triples leaders

== Notes ==
Preceded by John Shelby	Los Angeles Dodgers First Base Coach; 2006–2010	Succeeded by Davey Lopes
