= Judo in India =

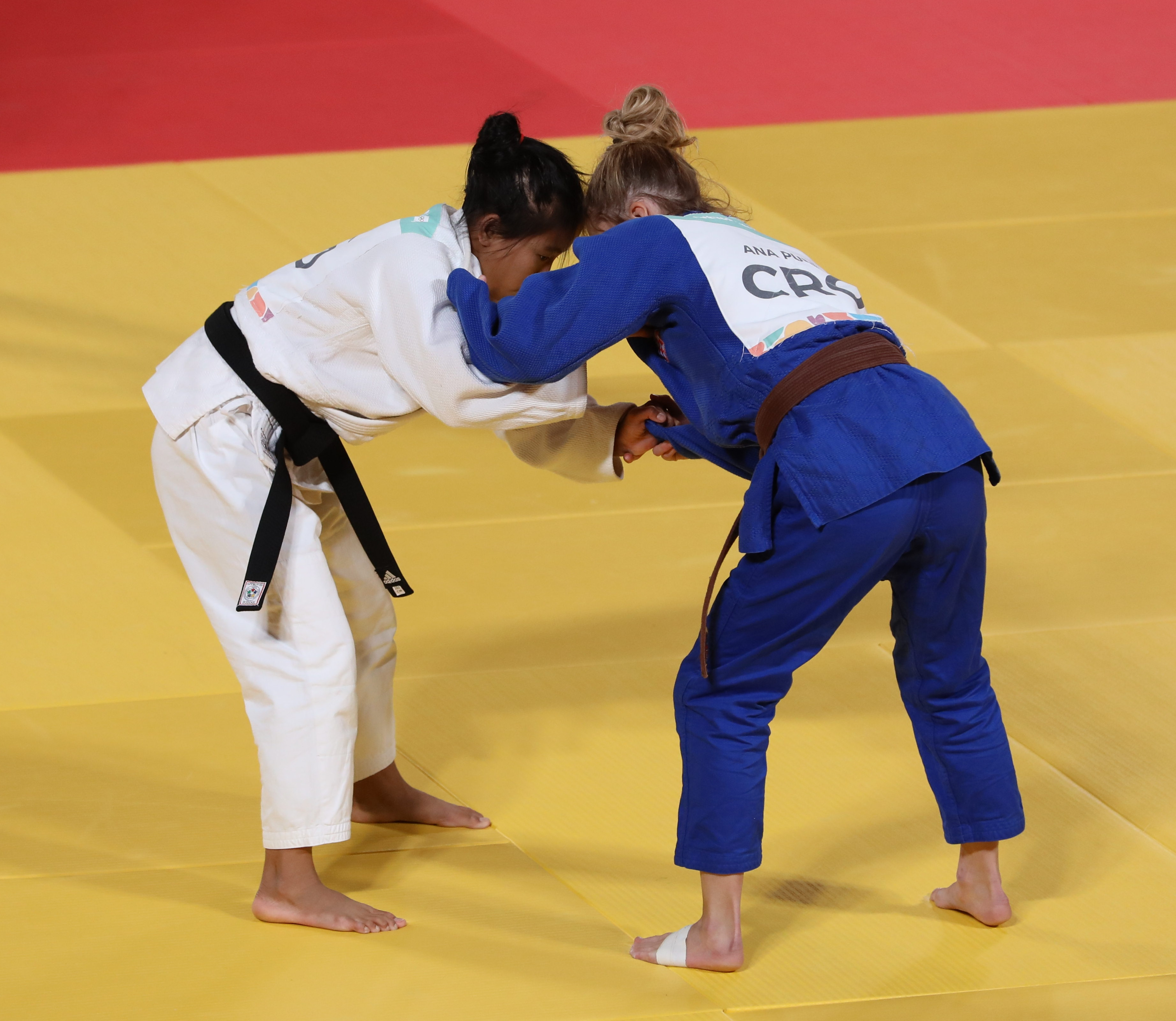
- Thangjam (India) vs Puljiz (Croatia) at the 2018 Summer Youth Olympics
- Country: India
- Governing body: Judo Federation of India
- National team: India

Judo has a growing presence in India. The sport is governed by the Judo Federation of India (JFI), established in 1965.

== History ==
The first written record of judo in India refers to demonstrations and coaching by Japanese judoka Shinzo Takagaki in Shantiniketan, arranged by Rabindranath Tagore in 1929.

The first National Judo Championship was organised at Hyderabad in 1966. An Indian team participated in an international judo competition for the first time at the 1986 Asian Games in Seoul, which was also the first time judo was included as an event at the Asian Games. India won four bronze medals in its debut international judo tournament. Indian judokas have also participated at the Olympic Games.

Narender Singh holds the distinction of being the first judoka to represent India at two Olympic Games, in 1992 and 1996. In the 2010 Judo World Cup in Tashkent, Thoudam Kalpana Devi of Manipur became the first Indian to win a World Cup top-three finish.

The JFI, in association with the IJF, organized a two-week judo development programme in October 2016 across 9 North Indian cities.

== Total medals won by Indian judo players in major tournaments ==
Competition	Gold	Silver	Bronze	Total
Asian Games	0	0	5	5
Commonwealth Games	2	6	7	11
Asian Championships	0	4	11	15
Total	0	9	22	31

- updated till 2023

== Notable Indian judokas ==
- Akram Shah
- Angom Anita Chanu
- Avtar Singh
- Cawas Billimoria
- Garima Chaudhary
- Narendra Singh
- Tombi Devi
