= Akeel Morris =

American baseball player (born 1992)

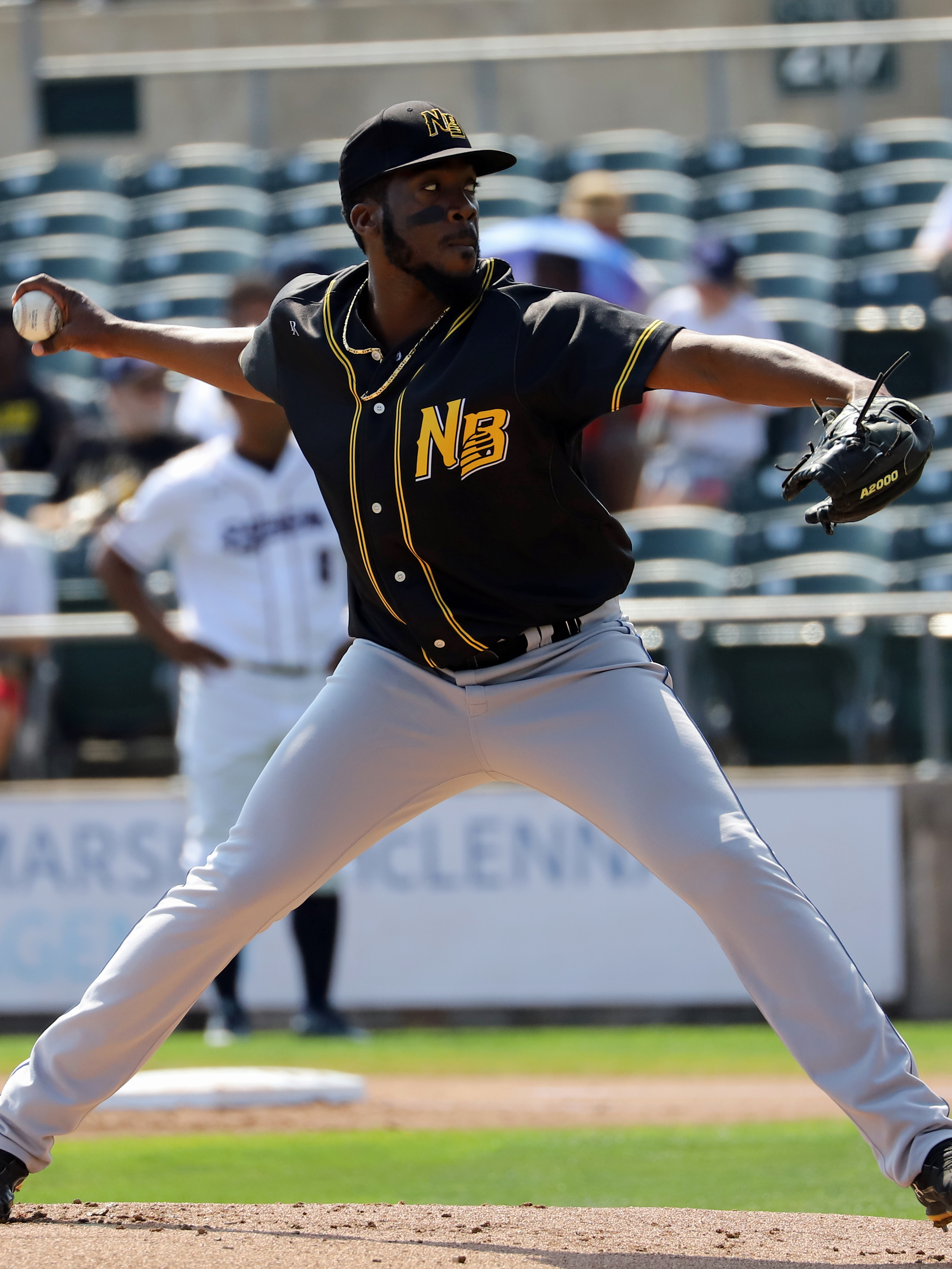
- Morris with the New Britain Bees in 2019

Free agent
- Pitcher
- Born: November 14, 1992 (age 33); Saint Thomas, U.S. Virgin Islands
- Bats: Right Throws: Right

MLB debut
- June 17, 2015, for the New York Mets

MLB statistics (through 2018 season)
- Win–loss record: 0–0
- Earned run average: 6.14
- Strikeouts: 16
- Stats at Baseball Reference

Teams
- New York Mets (2015); Atlanta Braves (2017); Los Angeles Angels (2018)

Akeel Jamael Morris (born November 14, 1992) is an American Virgin Islander professional baseball pitcher for the Mumbai Cobras of Baseball United. He has previously played in Major League Baseball (MLB) for the New York Mets, Atlanta Braves, and Los Angeles Angels. He was drafted by the Mets in the 10th round of the 2010 MLB draft, and made his MLB debut with them in 2015.

== Early life ==
Akeel Morris was born in Saint Thomas, U.S. Virgin Islands to Kenneth, a crane operator from Saint Kitts, and Corlette, an insurance agent from Antigua. Before he began to focus on pitching, his favorite baseball player was Derek Jeter; afterwards, it was Josh Beckett.

Morris attended Charlotte Amalie High School. In December 2009, he pitched a perfect game, striking out all 15 batters he faced. Morris' parents paid for their son to travel to the Dominican Republic to try out for the New York Mets.

== Professional career ==
=== New York Mets ===
Morris was drafted by the New York Mets in the 10th round, with the 302nd overall selection, of the 2010 Major League Baseball draft. He made his professional debut that season for the rookie-level Gulf Coast League Mets. He appeared in eight games with six starts, going 1–1 with a 2.19 ERA and 28 strikeouts over 24 2/3 innings.

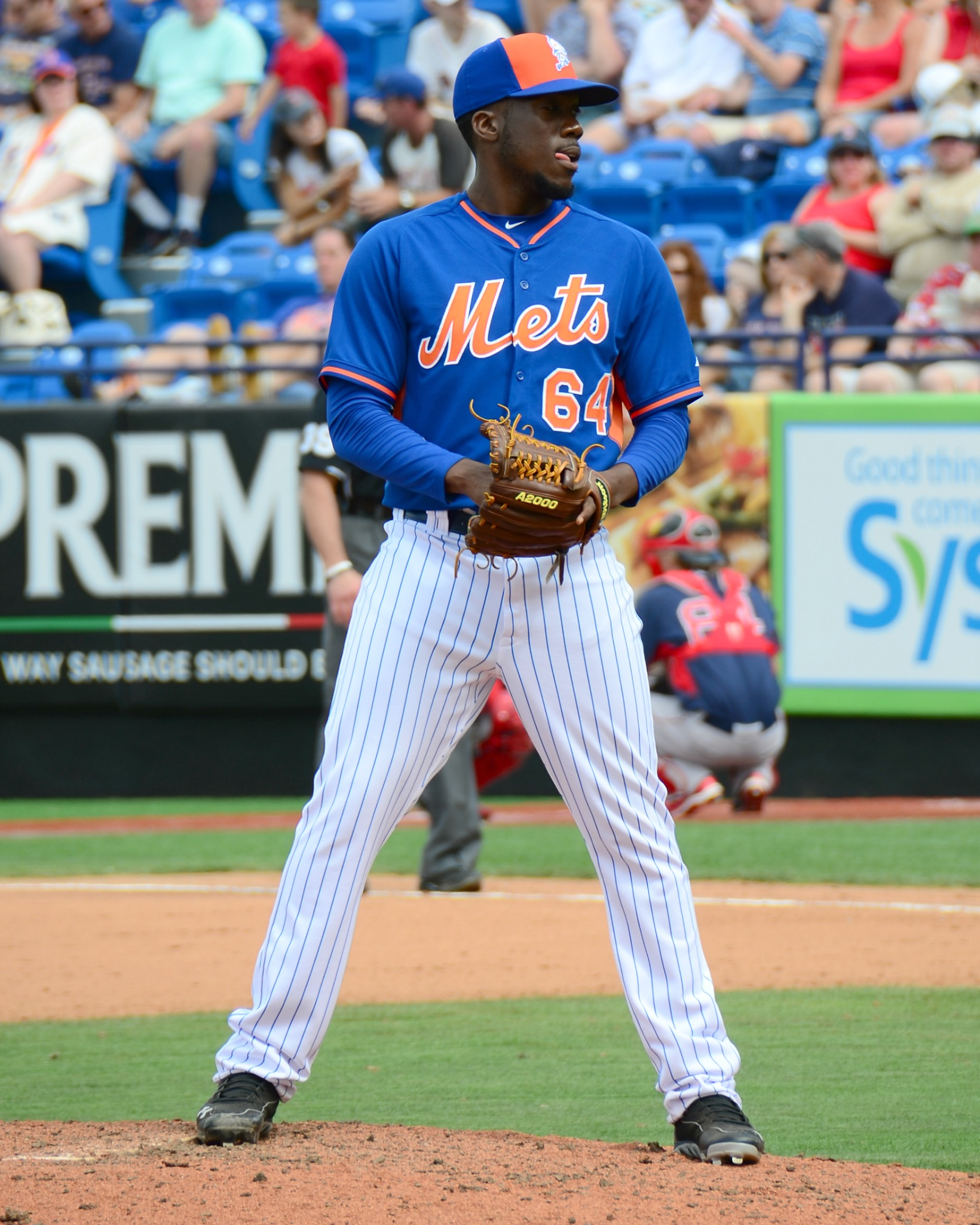
Morris with the New York Mets

Morris played 2011 and 2012 with the rookie-level Kingsport Mets. He played 2013 with the Low-A Brooklyn Cyclones, and was 4–1 with one save and a 1.00 ERA in 45 innings, and was fifth in the league with 12 strikeouts per 9 innings, and 10th with 5.8 hits per 9 innings.

After splitting time between starting and relieving his first four seasons, Morris became a full-time reliever for the Single-A Savannah Sand Gnats of the South Atlantic League in 2014. In a game against the Augusta GreenJackets in April, Morris struck out four batters in one inning. He finished the season 4-1--leading the league with 16 saves, a 0.63 ERA, 3.0 hits per 9 innings, 14.1 strikeouts per 9 innings, and a 0.719 WHIP—in 57 innings with 89 strikeouts over 41 appearances. Morris was named an SAL mid-season and post-season All Star, a 2014 MiLB Organization All Star, and a 2014 Baseball America Low-A All Star. On November 20, 2014, the Mets added Morris to their 40-man roster to protect him from the Rule 5 draft.

Morris began the 2015 season with the St. Lucie Mets of the High-A Florida State League (FSL), for whom he was 0–1 with a 1.69 ERA with 46 strikeouts and 13 saves in 32 innings, and was a mid-season FSL All Star. On June 15, 2015, Morris was promoted to the major leagues for the first time. He made his MLB debut on June 18 against the Toronto Blue Jays at Rogers Centre in the eighth and allowed five runs on three hits and three walks in 2/3 of an inning; it was his one MLB appearance for the season. To make room for Logan Verrett, Morris was sent to the Binghamton Mets, for whom he was 0–1 with a 2.45 ERA and 35 strikeouts across 29 1/3 innings pitched. Between the two minor league teams, he allowed 4.1 hits per 9 innings, and struck out 11.9 batters per 9 innings. He was named a 2015 MiLB Organization All Star.

Morris began the 2016 campaign with Double-A Binghamton, and posted a 2-2 record and 4.62 ERA with 36 strikeouts and six saves across 22 relief appearances.

=== Atlanta Braves ===
On June 8, 2016, the Mets traded Morris to the Atlanta Braves in exchange for Kelly Johnson. He was assigned to the Double–A Mississippi Braves on the same day. On August 12, Morris was recalled by the Braves. The next day, Morris was optioned down to Mississippi. On July 6, 2017, Morris was promoted to the Braves' major league roster. With the Braves, he was 1–0 with a 1.23 ERA and nine strikeouts in 7 1/3 innings. Morris' fastball topped out at 95 miles per hour, and his best pitch was a fading change-up.

Morris was designated for assignment by the Braves on March 31, 2018.

=== Los Angeles Angels ===
On April 3, 2018, Morris was traded to the Los Angeles Angels in exchange for cash considerations or a player to be named later. The Angels called up Morris four days later and he pitched in the game that day. He made nine appearances for the Angels, logging a 5.79 ERA with seven strikeouts across 14 innings of work. On August 15, Morris was designated for assignment by Los Angeles. He cleared waivers and was sent outright to the Triple–A Salt Lake Bees on August 18. Morris made 40 appearances for Salt Lake on the year, struggling to a 7.04 ERA with 45 strikeouts and 5 saves across 46 innings pitched. He elected free agency following the season on November 2.

=== High Point Rockers ===
On April 1, 2019, Morris was drafted by the High Point Rockers of the Atlantic League of Professional Baseball at the 2019 ALPB Player Showcase. In 22 appearances for the Rockers, Morris recorded a 4.23 ERA with 23 strikeouts across 27 2/3 innings pitched.

=== New Britain Bees ===
On July 8, 2019, Morris was traded to the Southern Maryland Blue Crabs of the Atlantic League of Professional Baseball. On July 12, he was traded to the New Britain Bees in order to complete an earlier trade, without appearing in a game for the Blue Crabs. In 16 appearances (13 starts) for the Bees, Morris compiled a 7-4 record and 4.94 ERA with 52 strikeouts across 74 2/3 innings pitched.

=== Long Island Ducks ===
On November 6, 2019, Morris was selected by the Long Island Ducks in the New Britain Bees dispersal draft. Morris did not play in a game in 2020 due to the cancellation of the ALPB season because of the COVID-19 pandemic and became a free agent after the year. On May 17, 2021, Morris re-signed with the Ducks. In three starts for Long Island, he threw 14 scoreless innings and struck out 17 batters.

=== San Francisco Giants ===
On June 11, 2021, Morris's contract was purchased by the San Francisco Giants organization. He split the remainder of the year with the Double-A Richmond Flying Squirrels and Triple-A Sacramento River Cats. Morris made 15 appearances (14 starts) for the two affiliates, accumulating a 7-3 record and 5.57 ERA with 86 strikeouts over 76 innings of work. He elected free agency following the season on November 7.

=== Long Island Ducks (second stint) ===
On March 31, 2022, Morris again signed with the Long Island Ducks. He made 24 starts for Long Island, compiling a 6-10 record and 5.65 ERA with 96 strikeouts across 122 2/3 innings pitched. Morris became a free agent following the season.

=== High Point Rockers (second stint) ===
On March 21, 2025, Morris signed with the High Point Rockers of the Atlantic League of Professional Baseball. In four appearances for the Rockers, he struggled to a 13.50 ERA with five strikeouts across 3 1/3 innings pitched. Morris was released by High Point on May 11.

=== Mumbai Cobras ===
In 2025, Morris signed with the Mumbai Cobras of Baseball United.

== International career ==
Morris is eligible to represent Great Britain in international baseball competition through his parents, born in Saint Kitts and Antigua, two overseas possessions of the United Kingdom. He represented Great Britain at the 2023 World Baseball Classic qualifiers, where they earned a berth to the main tournament for the first time. He pitched 2.1 innings in one start allowing one earned run and earning the win. In the main tournament, he had a blow up start against Canada where he allowed 5 runs in only 0.2 innings pitched, including a home run to Edouard Julien, for the loss.
