= Sayo Aizawa =

Japanese model and television personality (born 1978)

- 相沢 紗世
- Born: July 24, 1978 (age 47); Hiroshima, Japan
- Occupations: Model; television personality
- Years active: 1998–present
- Spouse: Hiroyuki Nakajima (m. 2015)
- Children: 2

Sayo Aizawa (相沢 紗世, Aizawa Sayo; born July 24, 1978) is a Japanese model and TV personality.

== Biography ==
She was born in Hiroshima, Japan and started her modeling career after her high school graduation. She is working exclusively for the fashion magazine Classy. She has also appeared in several dramas and TV commercials. She is fluent in five languages: Japanese, Chinese, Korean, Mongolian and English. At the age of 19, Sayo left her village, pursuing her goal to be a model.

== Personal life ==
In September 2015, Aizawa gave birth to her first child, a daughter. Later that same month, she married professional baseball player Hiroyuki Nakajima.

In February 2018, Aizawa gave birth to her second child, a son.
