= Shingo Hirata =

Japanese baseball player (born 1989)

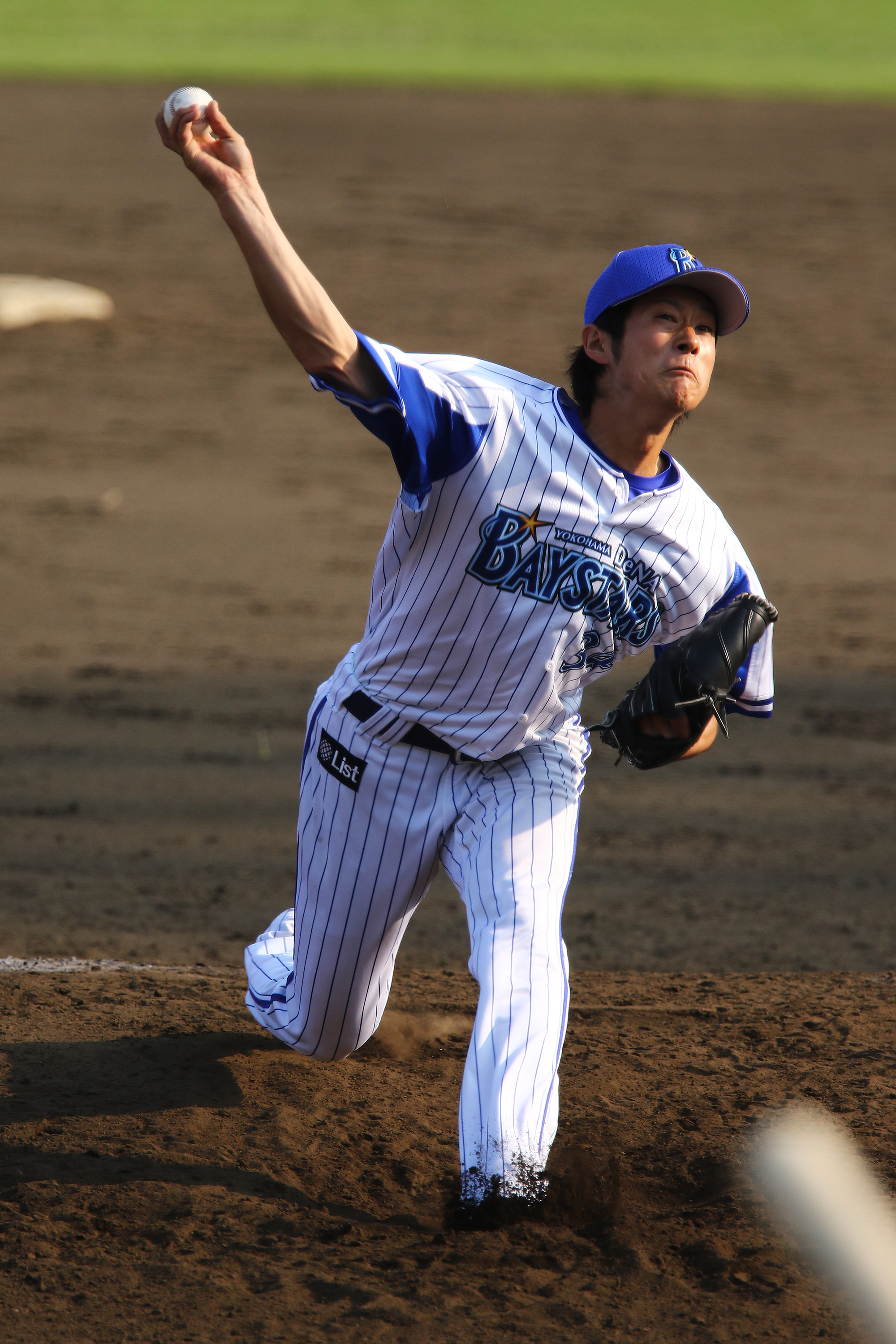
- Hirata with the Yokohama DeNA BayStars

Free agent
- Pitcher
- Born: August 29, 1989 (age 36); Shimonoseki, Yamaguchi, Japan
- Bats: Right Throws: Right

NPB debut
- March 28, 2014, for the Yokohama DeNA BayStars

NPB statistics (through 2022 season)
- Win–loss record: 7–7
- Earned run average: 4.57
- Strikeouts: 222
- Stats at Baseball Reference

Teams
- Yokohama DeNA BayStars (2014–2022)

Shingo Hirata (平田 真吾, Hirata Shingo; born August 29, 1989 in Shimonoseki, Yamaguchi, Japan) is a Japanese professional baseball pitcher who is a free agent. He plays for the Karachi Monarchs. He has previously played in Nippon Professional Baseball (NPB) for the Yokohama DeNA BayStars.
