= Judo Federation of India =

Judo federation

- Sport: Judo
- Jurisdiction: India
- Abbreviation: JFI
- Founded: 1965; 61 years ago
- Affiliation: International Judo Federation
- Affiliation date: 1965
- Regional affiliation: Judo Union of Asia
- Headquarters: F-14, Gali No.12, Parwana Road, Jagatpuri, New Delhi
- President: Retd. Justice Pankaj Naqvi ( Retd.), Administrator, JFI

Official website
- www.onlinejfi.org
- (India)

The Judo Federation of India is the national sports federation for judo in India.

== History ==
The first written record of judo in India refers to demonstrations and coaching by Japanese judoka Shinzo Takagaki in Shantiniketan, arranged by Rabindranath Tagore in 1929.

The JFI was established in 1965 and received affiliation from the International Judo Federation during the same year. The JFI organized the first National Judo Championship at Hyderabad in 1966. An Indian team participated in an international judo competition for the first time at the 1986 Asian Games in Seoul, which was also the first time judo was included as an event at the Asian Games. India won four bronze medals in its debut international judo tournament. Indian judokas have also participated at the Olympic Games.

In the 2010 Judo World Cup in Tashkent, Thoudam Kalpana Devi of Manipur became the first Indian to win a World Cup top-three finish.

The JFI opened its first Judo Academy in Sonipat, Haryana. The JFI opened its second training centre at the Anantapur Sports Academy on 30 May 2015. The third Judo Academy was opened at Dev Sanskriti Vishwavidyalaya in Haridwar, Uttarakhand in July 2015. A JFI training center was opened in Zemabawk North, Mizoram in May 2017.

The JFI, in association with the IJF, organized a two-week judo development programme in October 2016 across 9 North Indian cities.

== Total medals won by Indian Judo Players in Major tournaments ==
Competition	Gold	Silver	Bronze	Total
Asian Games	0	0	5	5
Commonwealth Games	0	5	6	11
Asian Championships	0	4	11	15
Total	0	9	22	31

== Notable Indian Judokas ==
- Narendra Singh
- Cawas Billimoria
- Akram Shah
- Angom Anita Chanu
- Khumujam Tombi Devi
- Avtar Singh
- Garima Chaudhary
