= Munenori Kawasaki =

Japanese baseball player (born 1981)

Munenori Kawasaki 川崎宗則
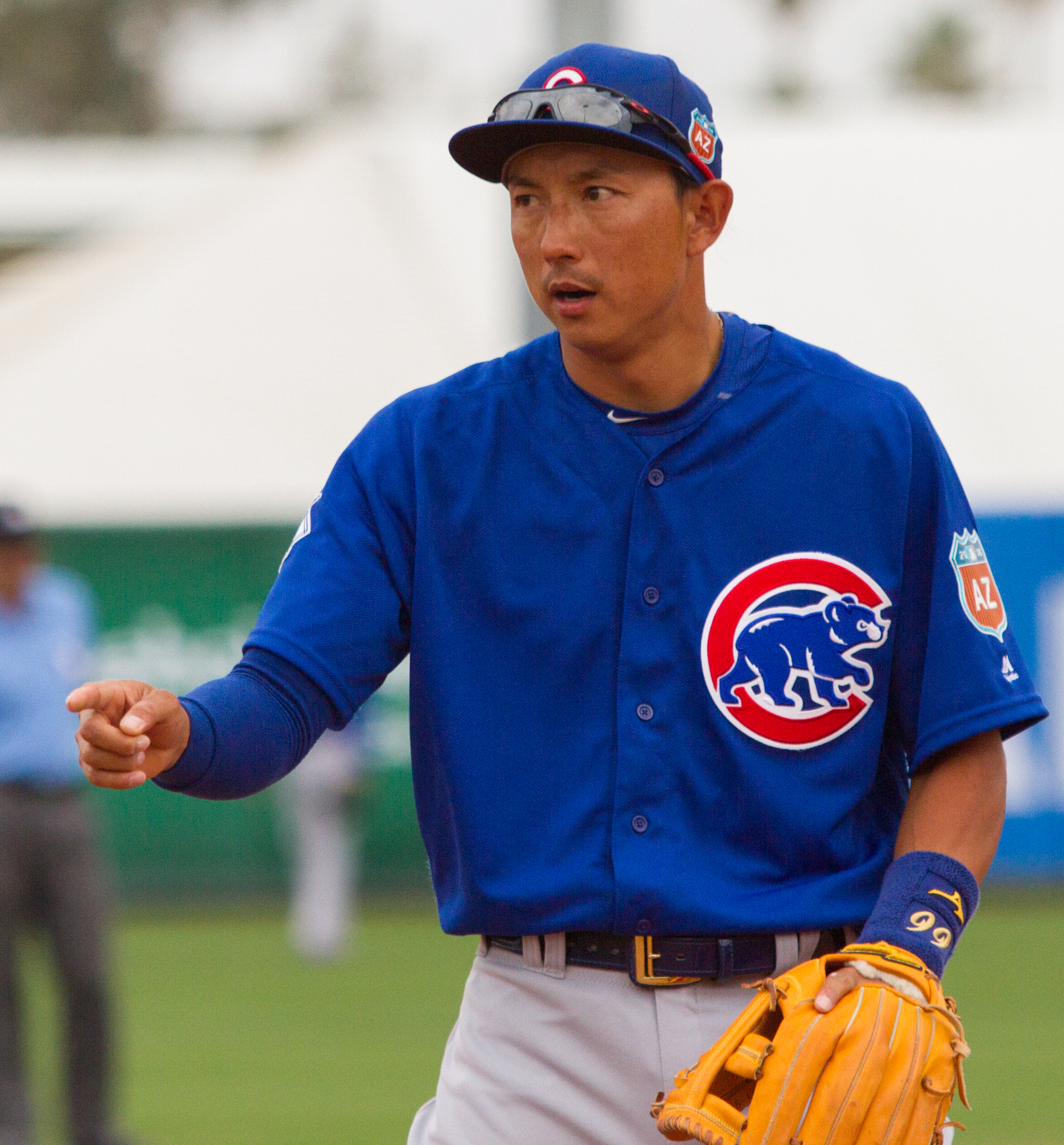
- Kawasaki with the Chicago Cubs in 2016

Tochigi Golden Braves – No. 52
- Shortstop / Second baseman
- Born: June 3, 1981 (age 45); Aira, Kagoshima, Japan
- Batted: Left Threw: Right

Professional debut
- NPB: October 3, 2001, for the Fukuoka Daiei Hawks
- MLB: April 7, 2012, for the Seattle Mariners

Last MLB appearance
- October 2, 2016, for the Chicago Cubs

NPB statistics (through 2017 season)
- Batting average: .292
- Hits: 1,376
- Home runs: 27
- Runs batted in: 373
- Stolen bases: 267

MLB statistics (through 2016 season)
- Batting average: .237
- Hits: 150
- Home runs: 1
- Runs batted in: 51
- Stolen bases: 12
- Stats at Baseball Reference

Teams
- Fukuoka SoftBank Hawks (2001–2011) (Note: Prior to the 2005 season, the team was known as the Fukuoka Daiei Hawks.); Seattle Mariners (2012); Toronto Blue Jays (2013–2015); Chicago Cubs (2016); Fukuoka SoftBank Hawks (2017)

Career highlights and awards
- NPB: 3× Japan Series Champion (2003, 2011, 2017); 8× NPB All-Star (2004–2011); NPB All-Star Game MVP (2005); 2× Best Nine Award (2004, 2006); 2× Golden Glove Award (2004, 2006); Pacific League Hits Leader (2004); Pacific League stolen base Leader (2004); Interleague play (NPB) MVP (2008); United Series MVP (2025); MLB: World Series Champion (2016)
Medals
Men's baseball
Representing Japan
World Baseball Classic
Gold medal – first place	2006 San Diego	Team
Gold medal – first place	2009 Los Angeles	Team

Munenori Kawasaki (川﨑 宗則, Kawasaki Munenori; born June 3, 1981) is a Japanese professional baseball shortstop and second baseman for the Tochigi Golden Braves of the Baseball Challenge League in Japan. Previously, Kawasaki played in Nippon Professional Baseball (NPB) for the Fukuoka SoftBank Hawks, and in Major League Baseball (MLB) for the Seattle Mariners, Toronto Blue Jays, and Chicago Cubs. He played for the Japanese national team in the 2008 Beijing Olympics as well as the 2006 and 2009 World Baseball Classics.

== Early life ==
Kawasaki was born in the southern Japanese prefecture of Kagoshima in an area known as Aira. He began playing baseball after his older brother got him into the sport. Though he was a pitcher throughout his early years, Kawasaki switched to shortstop after enrolling in Kagoshima Prefectural Technical High School.

Kawasaki remained largely an unknown on the national level during his high school career, partly due to his team's failing to make any national tournaments in those three years. Still, he made a name for himself locally, earning the nickname Satsurō, a portmanteau derived from Satsuma (the name given to a former province of Japan in present-day western Kagoshima), and former Seattle Mariners outfielder Ichiro Suzuki's first name, for the similarities in their playing styles. He was drafted in the fourth round of the 1999 NPB amateur draft by the then-Fukuoka Daiei Hawks.

== Professional career ==
=== Fukuoka SoftBank Hawks ===
==== 2000–2002 ====
Kawasaki earned the starting shortstop job for the Hawks' nigun team (Japanese for "minor league" or "farm team") in his rookie season (2000), hitting .300 and finishing fifth in the Western League in batting average that year. In 2001, his second season in the pros, he came second (to only then-Tohoku Rakuten Golden Eagles outfielder Akihito Moritani) with 29 stolen bases. He made his debut at the ichigun (major league) level on October 3 against the Orix BlueWave as the starting shortstop and No. 2 hitter, but went hitless in four at-bats that year.

Kawasaki hit .367 in the Western League the following year (2002), winning the batting title despite falling short of the required number of plate appearances because of league regulations. He got the first hit of his career on June 15 against right-hander Jeremy Powell, then of the Osaka Kintetsu Buffaloes, and his first stolen base on June 19 against the Seibu Lions. He was called up to the ichigun team again in September to fill in for Tadahito Iguchi as the team's regular second baseman while Iguchi missed time due to injury and also played in the 15th IBAF International Cup as a member of the Japanese national team.

==== 2003–2005 ====
In 2003, Kawasaki started in the Hawks' season opener for the first time in his career because of injuries to veteran Yusuke Torigoe, starting at shortstop as the team's No. 2 hitter. After Torigoe returned to the lineup, Kawasaki moved over to third base, wreaking havoc on the basepaths along with leadoff hitter Arihito Muramatsu and Iguchi (who sat in the 3-hole). He hit his first career home run on July 28 off Buffaloes right-hander Ken Kadokura, and while he finished the season just short of .300, he played his first full season at the ichigun level and hit .294 with two homers, 51 RBI and 30 steals, playing a key role in the Hawks' league title and eventual Japan Series championship.

Kawasaki became the Hawks' starting shortstop for the 2004 season, playing in all 133 regular season games and hitting over .300 for the first time in his career. He led the league in both hits (174, tied with teammate and cleanup hitter Nobuhiko Matsunaka) and steals (42) and was chosen to both the Best Nine and Golden Glove awards. Kawasaki declined the team's offer to change his uniform number from 52 to 8 during the off-season. (The number is an homage to Ichiro Suzuki, who wears the number 51; Kawasaki idolized Suzuki from a young age and picked the number because he wanted to "follow" in Suzuki's footsteps.)

Kawasaki had a somewhat disappointing season in 2005, seeing his batting average drop off from .303 in 2004 to .271 and his on-base percentage from .359 to just .326, knocking in just 36 runs and stealing only 21 bases. Despite this, he was named to the Japanese national team to play in the inaugural World Baseball Classic during the off-season.

==== 2006–2011 ====
Coming off a championship in the inaugural World Baseball Classic, Kawasaki bounced back in 2006, hitting a career-high .312 and winning the Pacific League Best Nine and Golden Glove awards at shortstop (each for the second time). He also received the most fan votes at shortstop for the MLB Japan All-Star Series held in November, but withdrew from the tournament after injuring the ring finger on his right hand during Fall Training.

Kawasaki suffered various injuries in the 2007 season, twice spending time in the minors to rehab and playing just 95 games (though he hit .329 and slugged .428, both career highs).

Kawasaki's woes continued into 2008 as he attempted to play through an injury to his left foot. He hit a team-high .366 in interleague games and collected 37 hits (leading the NPB), leading the Hawks to their first interleague title and winning the interleague Most Valuable Player (marking the first time a position player had been named to the award). However, though he was chosen to play in the 2008 Beijing Olympics as a member of the national team, he was diagnosed with periostitis during the tournament. On August 25, Kawasaki was found to have a stress fracture in his second metatarsal bone upon returning to Japan after the Olympics. He made an earlier-than-expected return, coming off the bench in the last game of the regular season (and then-manager Sadaharu Oh's last at the helm) on October 7 against the Eagles, but finished 0-for-2 with an intentional walk (the Hawks lost the game in extra innings).

=== Seattle Mariners ===
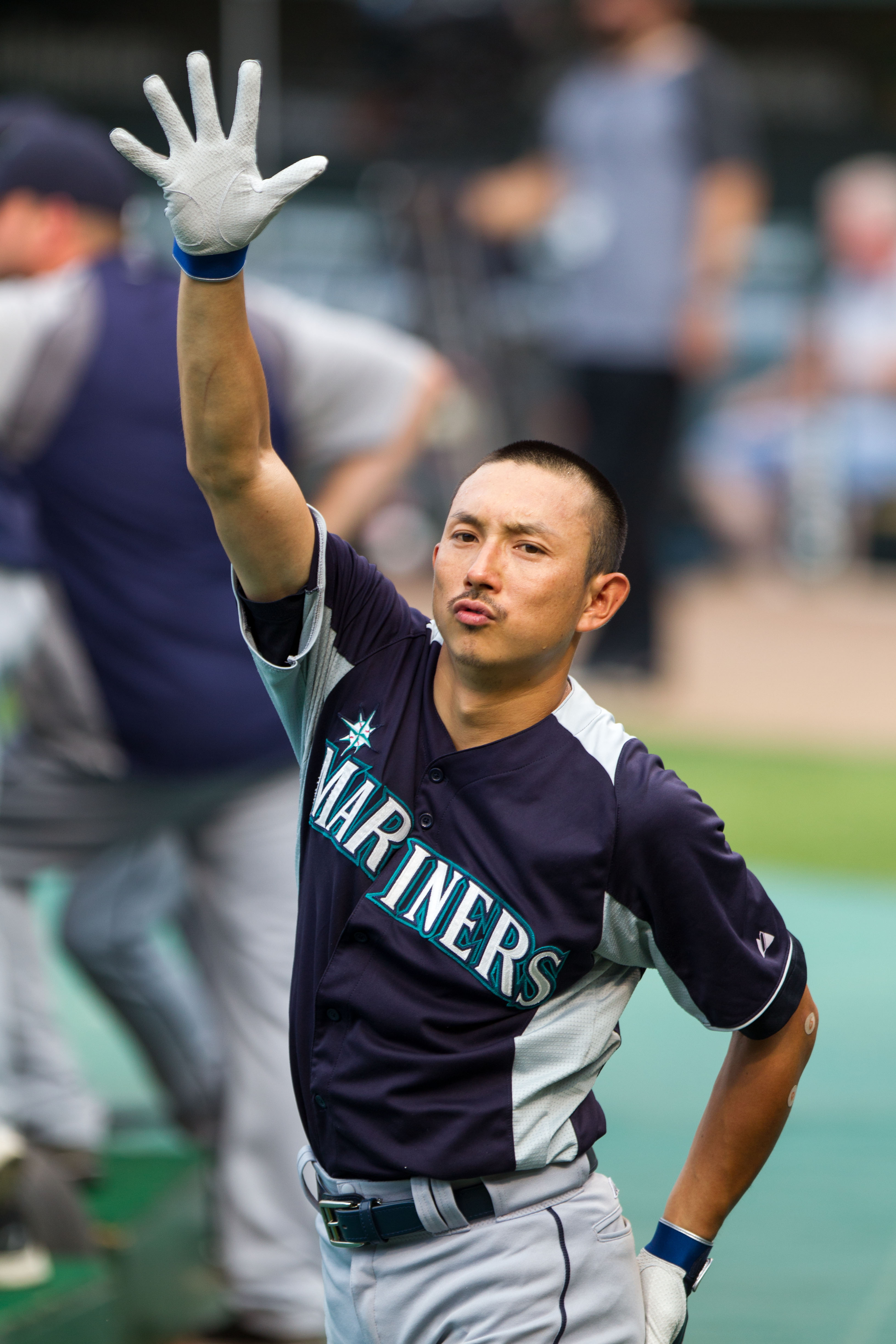
Kawasaki during his tenure with the Seattle Mariners in 2012

==== 2012 ====
Kawasaki signed a minor league contract with an invitation to spring training with the Seattle Mariners prior to the 2012 Major League Baseball season.

In his professional American debut, on March 2, 2012, Kawasaki went 0–3 against the Oakland Athletics, with two strikeouts, starting at shortstop. He was replaced in the sixth inning by Carlos Triunfel.

On October 24, 2012, the Mariners announced they had released Kawasaki. He hit below the Mendoza Line, slashing .192/.257/.202 in 115 plate appearances in 61 games.

=== Toronto Blue Jays ===
==== 2013 ====
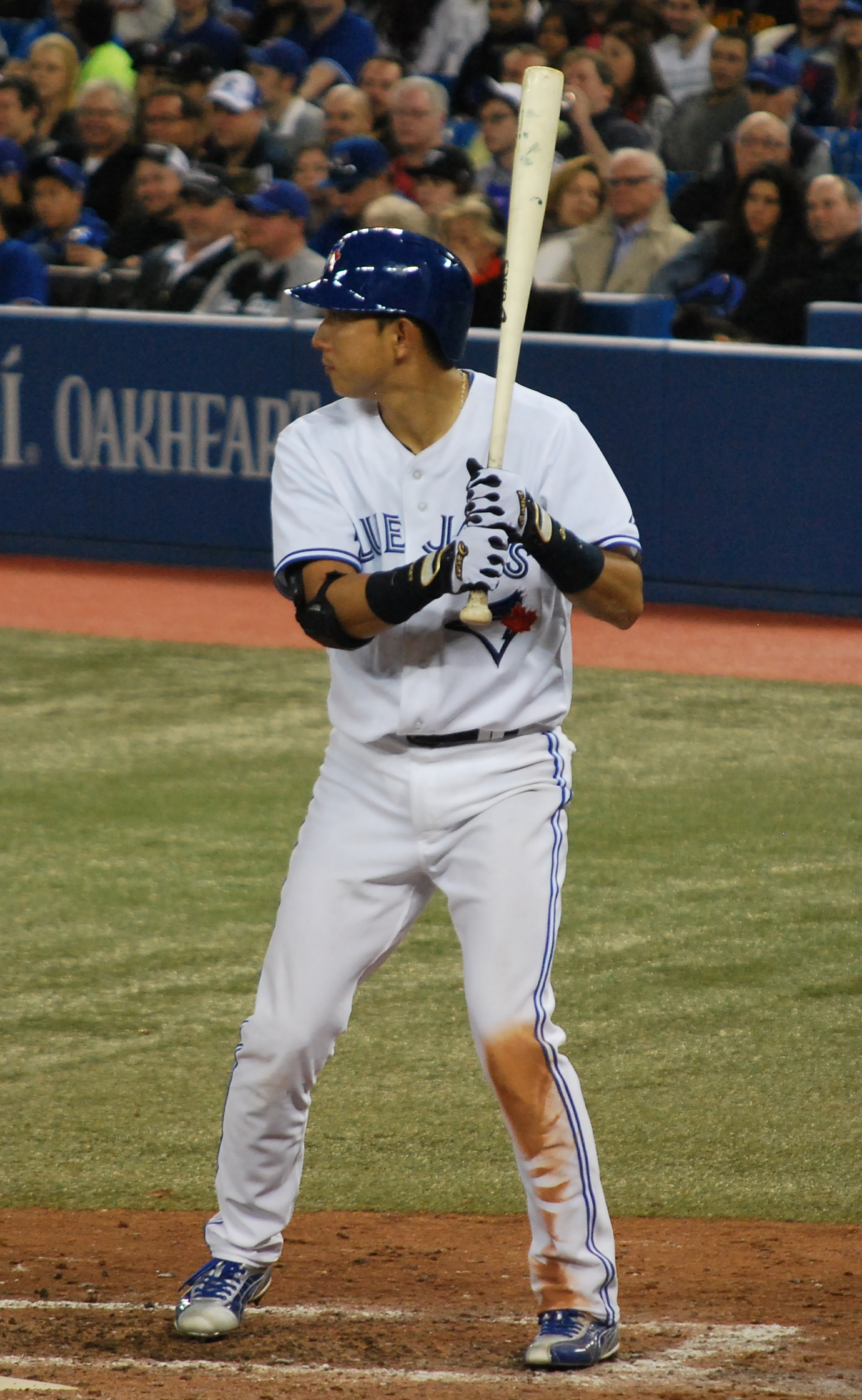
Kawasaki on April 15, 2013

Kawasaki agreed to a minor league deal with the Toronto Blue Jays on March 14, 2013. He started the 2013 season on the roster of the Triple-A Buffalo Bisons. Kawasaki was called up to the Blue Jays on April 13 when José Reyes was added to the disabled list. With his appearance for the Blue Jays on April 13, Kawasaki became the first Japanese-born position player to appear in a game for Toronto.

On April 21, 2013, Kawasaki batted in the leadoff slot for the first time in Toronto, scoring the game's first run against the New York Yankees. On May 26, in the final game of a 4-game series against the Baltimore Orioles, Kawasaki recorded his first MLB walk-off hit, with a two-run double against Baltimore closer Jim Johnson. On June 21, Kawasaki hit his first MLB home run, a two-run shot off Baltimore reliever Tommy Hunter, which tied the game 6–6. The Blue Jays would win the game 7–6 to extend their winning streak to 9 games. Kawasaki, at 32 years of age, became the oldest player in Blue Jays' history to hit his first career home run, one year older than Ken Huckaby. Kawasaki was optioned back to Triple-A Buffalo on June 26 when Jose Reyes was activated from the disabled list.

Toronto recalled Kawasaki from Triple-A Buffalo on June 28 after left-fielder Melky Cabrera was placed on the 15-day disabled list with left knee tendonitis. Kawasaki made his first MLB start at second base in a game against the Boston Red Sox on June 30, 2013. Kawasaki was optioned back to Triple-A on July 13 to make room for Brett Lawrie. Kawasaki was recalled on August 14 after Colby Rasmus was placed on the disabled list. Kawasaki was ejected for the first time in his major league career on September 21, against the Boston Red Sox after being called out at first base by umpire Eric Cooper and then subsequently throwing his helmet to the ground. He recorded his first career four-hit game on September 25, against the Baltimore Orioles. Kawasaki finished the 2013 regular season with a .229 batting average, one home run, and 24 RBI in 96 games. The Blue Jays declined his $1 million contract option on October 31, making him a free agent. Kawasaki was awarded the GIBBY award for Topic of the Year on December 10, 2013, for his postgame speech on May 26.

"Thank you very much. My name is Munenori Kawasaki, I come from Japan, I am Japaneeeeese. My teammates gave me an opportunity, so I wanted to do something about it."

— Munenori Kawasaki, GIBBY Topic of the Year award-winning post-game speech on May 26.

==== 2014 ====
On December 24, 2013, it was announced that Kawasaki had signed a minor-league contract with the Blue Jays that included an invitation to spring training. He did not make the major league squad, and was assigned to Triple-A Buffalo. On April 13, Kawasaki was recalled when Maicer Izturis was placed on the disabled list. He was optioned back to Buffalo on April 19, when Jose Reyes was activated. He was recalled again on June 17 when Steve Delabar was optioned to Buffalo. Kawasaki saw regular playing time after his call-up and appeared in 82 games for the Blue Jays in 2014. He batted .258 with 17 RBI for the season. Kawasaki was sent outright to the Buffalo Bisons on October 1, 2014, and became a free agent on October 31.

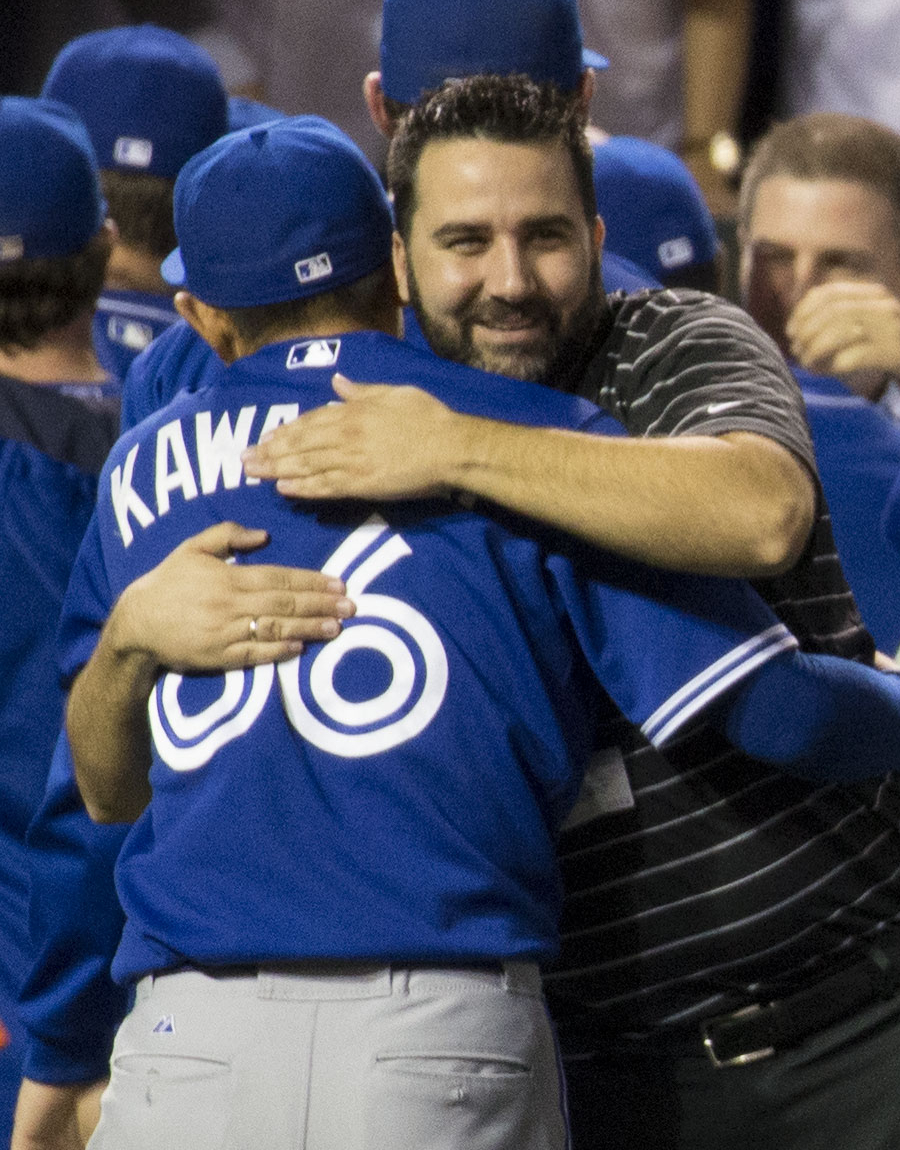
Kawasaki celebrating the Blue Jays American League East title with then-GM Alex Anthopoulos on September 30, 2015

==== 2015 ====
The Blue Jays re-signed Kawasaki to a minor league contract with an invitation to spring training on January 16, 2015. On March 31, he was reassigned to minor league spring training. The Blue Jays purchased Kawasaki's contract from Buffalo on May 21, and optioned him back to Buffalo on May 25 when José Reyes returned from the disabled list. He was recalled on May 31 when Steve Tolleson was placed on the disabled list, and optioned back on June 10. On August 1, Kawasaki was recalled from Buffalo. He was optioned back to Buffalo on August 9 when Cliff Pennington was added to the Blue Jays' roster. On September 1, Kawasaki was recalled by the Blue Jays. He appeared in 23 games in 2015, and batted .214 with 2 RBI. Though Kawasaki did not play in the Postseason, he was invited to travel with the team and was present for every Postseason game in the Blue Jays' dugout. He became a free agent at the end of the season.

=== Chicago Cubs ===
On January 21, 2016, Kawasaki signed a minor league contract with the Chicago Cubs that included an invitation to spring training. He was released on March 29, and re-signed to another minor league contract later that day. On April 3, he was added to the 40-man roster and optioned to the Triple-A Iowa Cubs. He was recalled to the 25 man roster on April 8 when Kyle Schwarber was placed on the disabled list. He was optioned back to Iowa on April 15, when Javier Báez was activated from the disabled list. He was recalled on July 9, and optioned back to Iowa on July 15. On September 6, Kawasaki was recalled from Iowa. In 14 games of 2016, Kawasaki batted .333 with an RBI and two stolen bases. The Cubs finished the season with a 103–58 record for an NL Central pennant, and would eventually win the 2016 World Series, ending their 108-year long world champion title drought. Kawasaki was ineligible for post-season play in 2016, but traveled with the Cubs throughout the playoffs and joined the team on the field for the post-game celebrations. He received a World Series ring despite not playing during the 2016 playoffs

On January 7, 2017, Kawasaki signed a new minor league contract with the Cubs. He was released on March 28.

=== Fukuoka SoftBank Hawks (second stint) ===
On March 31, 2017, Kawasaki signed with the Fukuoka SoftBank Hawks. He won his fourth Japan Series with the Hawks in 2017, hitting .241 with 4 RBI in 42 games. On March 26, 2018, Kawasaki was released by the Hawks, and reportedly intended to retire. However, he clarified his statement later that day, announcing that he was temporarily stepping away from baseball due to a nerve disorder.

=== Wei Chuan Dragons ===
On July 9, 2019, Kawasaki became a guest coach for the Wei Chuan Dragons of the Chinese Professional Baseball League. On July 13, he became a player-coach, but did not appear in any games for the team.

=== Tochigi Golden Braves ===
On September 7, 2020, Kawasaki signed with the Tochigi Golden Braves of the Baseball Challenge League. On September 13, 2020, he hit a home run on the first pitch he saw in his debut. On April 8, 2021, Kawasaki agreed to re-sign with the Golden Braves for the 2021 season. Kawasaki re-signed and played with the Golden Braves in 2022, 2023, 2024, 2025, and 2026 as well.

== International career ==
=== 2006 World Baseball Classic ===
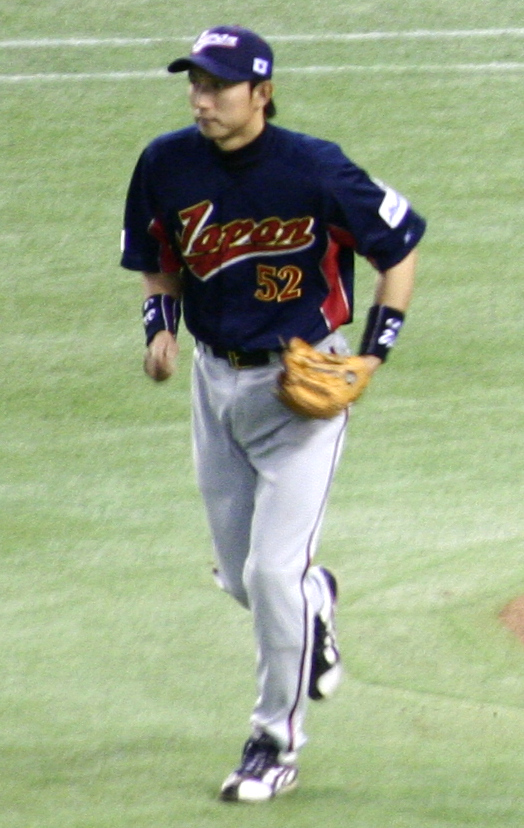
Kawasaki playing for Japan national team in 2006 World Baseball Classic

Kawasaki started at shortstop, mostly as the team's No. 9 hitter, in the inaugural World Baseball Classic and played a key role in Japan's championship run. Hitting out of the leadoff spot for the first time in the tournament finals against Cuba, Kawasaki scored on a base hit by Ichiro Suzuki in the top of the ninth inning, managing to brush home plate with his right hand while contorting his body and deftly avoiding the catcher's tag to score the seventh run for Japan.

While the Japanese media deemed the play sensational and dubbed it The Right Hand of God (à la former Argentine football player Diego Maradona's famous "Hand of God" goal), Kawasaki was later found to have injured his right elbow on the play and did not play in the regular season until mid April.

=== 2008 Beijing Olympics ===
In 2008, Kawasaki was chosen to play in the Olympics for the first time as a member of the national team, but ended up playing in just three games (though he went four-for-seven and scored two runs) due to a nagging left foot injury. Japan came up short in their medal run, finishing fourth behind South Korea, Cuba and the United States.

=== 2009 World Baseball Classic ===
Kawasaki played in the World Baseball Classic as a member of the national team for the second time in 2009. While he played in just five games and saw only seven at-bats (mostly as a pinch hitter) due to manager Tatsunori Hara's decision to use Saitama Seibu Lions second baseman Yasuyuki Kataoka over Kawasaki against left-handed starting pitchers, Kawasaki was instrumental in Japan's win over the United States in the tournament semi-finals, starting at third base as Japan's No. 9 hitter and going 2-for-4 with a steal and an RBI.

== Playing style ==
=== Hitting ===
Listed at 5 ft 11 in (1.80 m) and 175 lb (79 kg), Kawasaki is best described as a slap hitter, utilizing his exceptional bat control and speed to get on base (often bunting safely to do so). However, he is somewhat lacking in power, even for a middle infielder, having never hit more than five home runs (2004, 2005, 2007, 2020) or recorded more than 31 extra-base hits (2004, 2006) for a season.

While Kawasaki is considered by many to be a great base stealer, having led the league in steals in 2004 with 42, his career stolen base percentage is 70.0 percent (as of May 13, 2009). Modern sabermetric theory suggests that a player needs to be successful 70 to 75 percent of the time in stealing bases to have any kind of positive effect on the team's run production.

=== Fielding ===
A two-time Golden Glove award winner, Kawasaki had excellent range and instincts at shortstop and improved on his throwing tremendously after coming into the league. He was a versatile fielder, having logged time at all four infield positions (including first base) in the pros.

== Personal life ==
Kawasaki and his wife have one son, born in 2013.
