= Baseball United Ballpark =

Baseball stadium in Dubai

- ملعب بيسبول يونايتد (Arabic)
- Address: Dubai; United Arab Emirates
- Location: The Seven
- Capacity: 6,500

Construction
- Opened: November 7, 2024

Tenant
- Baseball United

The Baseball United Ballpark (Arabic: ملعب بيسبول يونايتد, ALA-LC: Mal‘ab Bīsbul Yūnāytid) is a baseball stadium in Dubai, United Arab Emirates.

== History ==
The Baseball United Ballpark was built by the Baseball United organization within 38 days. It was touted as the first ballpark in the Middle East. The venue's first tournament was the Baseball United Arab Classic, a national teams' tournament held from November 7 to 10, 2024.

== Facilities ==
The Baseball United Ballpark is a 6,500-seater baseball stadium within The Sevens complex. Its dimensions was patterned after the Yankee Stadium.
