= Karachi Monarchs =

Pakistani professional baseball team

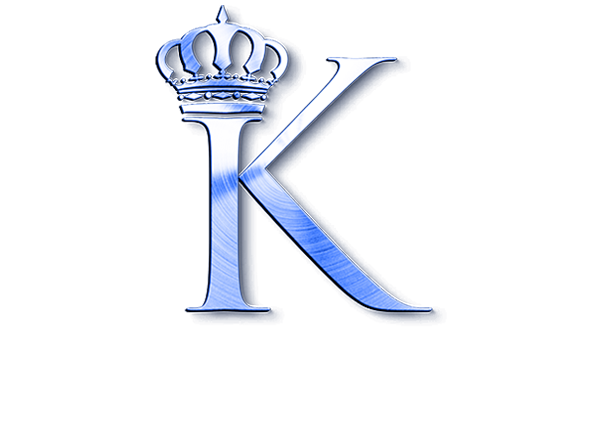
Logo
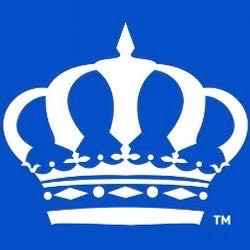
Cap insignia

Information
- League: Baseball United
- Location: Dubai, United Arab Emirates (representing Karachi)
- Ballpark: Baseball United Ballpark
- Founded: 2023
- Colours: Blue, White
- Manager: Jay Bell
- Website: www.karachimonarchs.com

The Karachi Monarchs are a professional baseball club that is a member of Baseball United. Founded in 2023, the team represents Karachi, Pakistan, and plays its games at the Baseball United Ballpark at The Sevens in Dubai. The league has scheduled its first season to start in October 2025.

== Roster ==
The Monarchs selected 20 players during the 2023 Baseball United Draft, some of whom previously played in Major League Baseball. The selection of 50-year-old four-time All-Star and 2005 AL Cy Young Award winner Bartolo Colón in the 2nd round received some media attention.

Karachi Monarchs roster – 2025 Baseball United season
| Players | | Coaches |
| Pitchers: 1 (United States) Isaac Milburn; 7 (United States) Mark Simon; 10 (Sint Maarten) Franklin van Gurp; 15 (United States) Kolby Kiser; 17 (United States) Alex Dubord; 22 (Pakistan) Faisal Hayat; 24 (United States) Scott Ellis; 30 (Pakistan) Musharaf Khan; 36 (Panama) Enrique Burgos; 51 (South Korea) Kyeong-Chun Chae; 66 (Finland) Konsta Kurikka | Catchers: 14 (Venezuela) Henderson Perez; 20 (United States) Omar Veloz; Infielders: 2 (United States) Pavin Parks; 3 (Costa Rica) Jake Perez; 4 (United States) Pierce Khan; 6 (Pakistan) Amar Mahmood; 9 (United States) Isaac Nunez; 13 (Curaçao) Juremi Profar; Outfielders: 8 (Curaçao) Karim Ayubi; 12 (Mexico) Eric Meza; 18 (United States) Max Jung-Goldberg; 55 (Venezuela) Jose Acosta | Manager: 11 (United States) Jay Bell; Coaches: 5 (United States) Tyger Pederson (third base); 23 (United States) Frank Gonzales (pitching); 25 (United States) Erick Richardson (first base); 26 (Dominican Republic) Julian Martinez (bullpen); Roster updated on 15 November 2025 |
