= The Sevens Stadium =

Rugby stadium in Dubai, United Arab Emirates

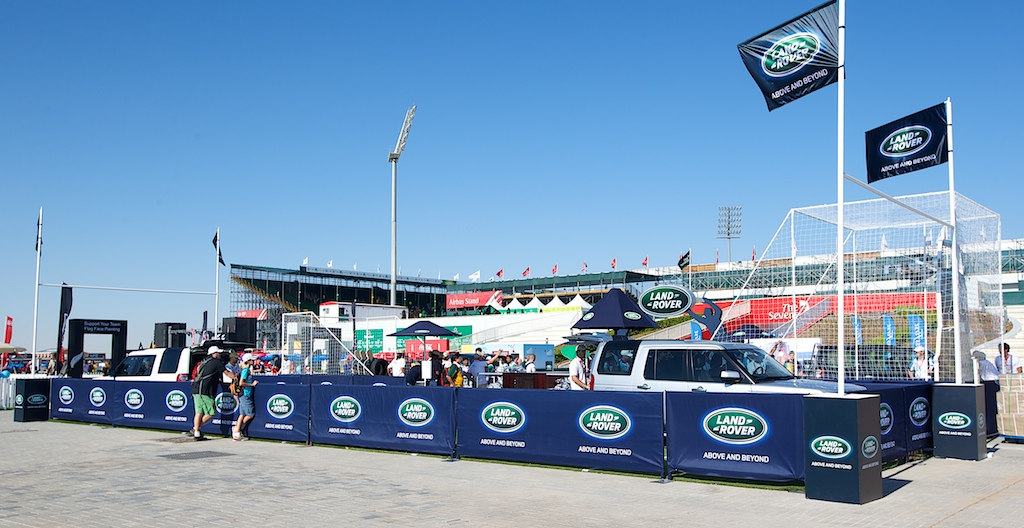
- The Sevens Stadium
- Interactive map of The Sevens Stadium
- Full name: The Sevens Stadium
- Address: Ud al-Bayda; Dubai; United Arab Emirates
- Coordinates: 24°59′45″N 55°28′4″E
- Owner: Emirates Airline
- Main venue: Pitch 1 Capacity: 4,000 (permanent; expandable to 37,500)
- Facilities: Pitches 2–8, 3 cricket ovals, courts, pool, ballpark

Construction
- Groundbreaking: 2007
- Built: 2008
- Opened: 28 November 2008

Tenants
- United Arab Emirates national rugby union team United Arab Emirates national baseball team Dubai Hurricanes; Dubai Exiles RFC

Ground information

International information
- First men's T20I: 23 January 2026: Ireland v Italy
- Last men's T20I: 26 January 2026: Ireland v Italy
- Only women's T20I: 18 April 2024: Ireland v Thailand
- As of 25 January 2026; Source: ESPNcricinfo

The Sevens Stadium is a rugby sevens stadium in Ūd al-Baydāʾ, Dubai, United Arab Emirates. The Sevens Stadium is a venue for rugby, association football, Gaelic football, Australian football (Aussie rules football), netball, basketball, cricket, tennis, track and field, baseball, and concerts.

The Sevens Stadium is located at the intersection of the Dubai-Al Ain Road (E66) and the Jebel Ali-Lahbab Road (E77). The complex offers parking for around 15,000 vehicles.

Facilities at The Sevens Stadium include: eight rugby/football pitches, six cricket pitches (3 grass (2 floodlit), 3 subhka), four netball/tennis courts, one basketball court, a grandstand, and international-standard ancillary facilities ideal for sports events. All courts and pitches are floodlit.

It was the venue for the first HSBC A5N Youth Rugby Festival in February 2009. The Emirates Airline Dubai Sevens is a round of the World Rugby Sevens Series which has been held at The Sevens annually since 2008.

== Concerts ==
- Rod Stewart performed at the stadium on 7 March 2010 during his Soulbook Tour.
- Duran Duran performed at the stadium on 8 March 2012 during their All You Need Is Now Tour.
- Justin Bieber has performed at the stadium on 4 and 5 May 2013 during his Believe Tour in front of a crowd of 28,544 people.
- One Direction performed at the stadium on 4 April 2015 during their On the Road Again Tour in front of a crowd of 29,300 people.
- Kylie Minogue performed at the stadium on 6 December 2019 as a celebration of the Rugby 7s 50th year.
- Ed Sheeran performed at the stadium on 19-20 January 2024 as a part of his The Mathematics Tour in front of a crowd of 60,000 fans.

Preceded by Hong Kong Stadium; Hong Kong	Rugby World Cup Sevens; Venue; 2009	Succeeded by Luzhniki Stadium; Russia
