= Baseball United =

Emirati baseball organization

- Current season, competition or edition: 2025 Baseball United season
- Sport: Baseball
- Founded: 2022; 4 years ago
- First season: 2025
- No. of teams: 4
- Countries: India (1 team); Pakistan (1 team); UAE (2 teams)
- Most recent champion: Mid East Falcons (2025)
- Broadcaster: Zee (India)
- Streaming partner: ZEE5 (India)
- Website: BaseballUnited.com

Baseball United is a professional baseball organization in West Asia and South Asia. It began with two showcase games in Dubai in November 2023. The winter league's first season with four teams representing cities in India, Pakistan, and the United Arab Emirates competed in 2025.

== History ==
The United International Baseball League (UIBL) was founded on July 26, 2022, with a mission of bringing professional baseball to India, Pakistan, and the Middle East. Baseball Hall-of-Famers Mariano Rivera and Barry Larkin were announced as founding stakeholders. Rather than build new baseball fields, the league plans to redevelop existing cricket fields into baseball diamonds.

On August 18, 2022, the UIBL announced that it would play nine of its inaugural games at the Dubai International Cricket Stadium. In November, the UIBL rebranded as "Baseball United."

Baseball United partnered with Pakistan Federation Baseball to organize the West Asia edition of the 2023 Asian Baseball Cup in Islamabad. In April 2023, active MLB shortstop Elvis Andrus joined the league's ownership group. The league has since announced other current and former MLB players as "co-owners," including Ronald Acuña Jr., Albert Pujols, Félix Hernández, and Ryan Howard.

On May 15, 2023, the league announced its first franchise as the Mumbai Cobras. Former Major League Baseball (MLB) All-Star Chris Sabo was named the team's first manager.

On May 30, 2023, the Karachi Monarchs was announced as the second team in the league. The Monarchs name references both the Karachi Kings cricket team and the Kansas City Monarchs of the Negro leagues. On June 5, 2023, Karachi appointed Hall of Famer Adrian Beltre and former MLB Most Valuable Player Miguel Tejada as its general manager and manager, respectively. On August 4, 2023, Baseball United announced the Dubai Wolves and Abu Dhabi Falcons as the third and fourth baseball teams. The two teams were renamed the Arabia Wolves and the Mid East Falcons, respectively, in 2024.

The league's draft took place on October 23, 2023. Karan Patel, a right-handed pitcher who reached Double-A in the Chicago White Sox organization, was selected first overall by the Mumbai Cobras. Former MLB players drafted included Robinson Canó, Bartolo Colon, Pablo Sandoval, Didi Gregorius, and Andrelton Simmons.

On March 26, 2024, the league announced a fifth franchise based in Riyadh, Saudi Arabia that did not have a nickname but eventually team was not formed. On August 1, 2024, the league announced that its first full season is scheduled from October 23, 2025 to November 23, 2025. The four teams would each play 12 games. The timing and length of the season is similar to existing winter league baseball competitions. Additionally, the league stated that the first four announced teams would compete in the Baseball United Cup from February 22 to March 1, 2025. The cup had a round robin format, followed by a four-team playoff. Baseball United also announced it would organize the Baseball United Arab Classic, an international baseball tournament between various West Asian teams, scheduled for November 7 to November 10, 2024 in Dubai.

The inaugural season of Baseball United involving the four founding franchises was held in November to December 2025, with the Falcons winning the first United Series championship.

The league announced on February 18, 2026 that CEO Kash Shaikh would step down at the end of the month. It later announced that John Miedreich, co-founder and head of baseball operations, would take his place as CEO, while the board would be restructured to include owners Barry Larkin as chairman and Adrián Beltré and Robinson Chirinos as vice chairs.

On July 3, 2026, it was announced that the league would not hold a season in the winter of 2026-27, and instead focus on engagement efforts and strengthening its long-term vision ahead of a planned return in 2027-28.

== Teams ==
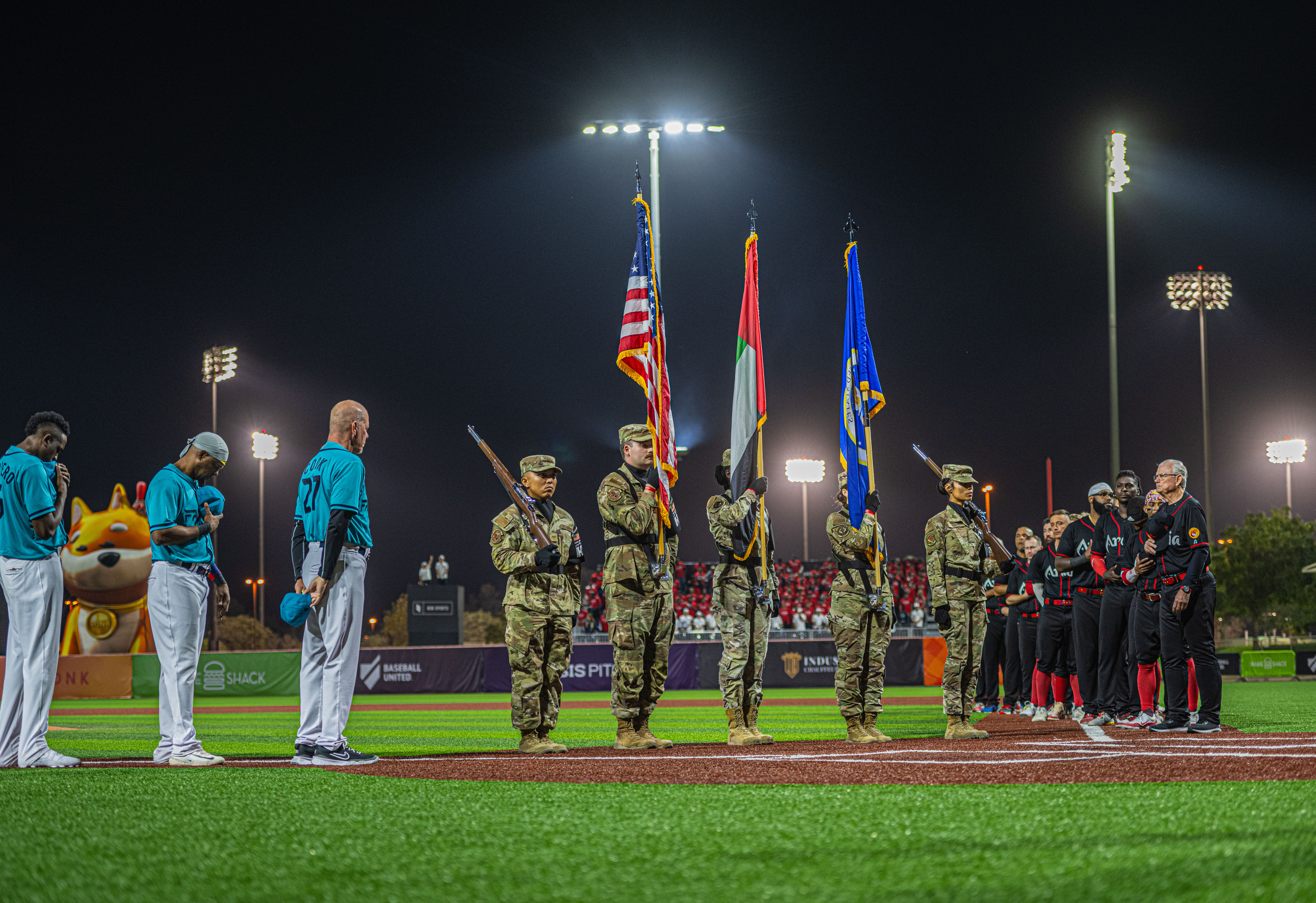
The Mid East Falcons and Arabia Wolves before the 2025 UAE Series

There are five teams (representing cities from various Asian countries) affiliated with Baseball United. The four founding franchises competed in the inaugural 2025 season.

Team	City	Country	Joined
Mumbai Cobras	Mumbai	India	2023
Karachi Monarchs	Karachi	Pakistan	2023
Arabia Wolves	Dubai	United Arab Emirates	2023
Mid East Falcons	Abu Dhabi	United Arab Emirates	2023

== Venue ==
The 6,500 seater Baseball United Ballpark at The Sevens in Dubai serves as the venue of the league.

== Rule changes ==
Baseball United has implemented various rule changes from traditional baseball, most notably the "moneyball", which allows the batting team to score double the amount of runs batted in during a single play, providing that the "moneyball" was used during the at-bat. During the Baseball United All-Star Showcase in November 2023, Pablo Sandoval hit the first "six-run home run" in baseball history during a "moneyball" at bat, after he hit what would normally be a three-run homer off of Indian pitching prospect Saurabh Gaikwad, scoring Dillon Thomas and Andrelton Simmons. Some commentators have floated the "moneyball" as a potential rule change for Major League Baseball, while others have criticized it and dismissed it as a "gimmick."

== Criticism ==
Critics, primarily in the United States, have stated that the formation of Baseball United and its partnerships with prominent MLB players is an example of sportswashing.

== See also ==
- Asia Series
- History of baseball outside the United States
