= 2012 Caribbean Series =

2012 baseball tournament

The fifty-fourth edition of the Caribbean Series (Serie del Caribe) baseball competition was played in 2012. It was held from February 2 through to February 7 with the champions teams from Dominican Republic (Leones del Escogido), Puerto Rico (Indios de Mayagüez), Venezuela (Tigres de Aragua), and Mexico (Yaquis de Obregón). The format consisted of twelve games in a double round-robin format with each team facing each other twice. The games were played at Estadio Quisqueya in Santo Domingo, Dominican Republic.

== Final standings ==
Country	Club	W	L	W/L %	GB	Managers
Dominican Republic	Leones del Escogido	4	2	.667	–	Ken Oberkfell
Puerto Rico	Indios de Mayagüez	3	3	.500	1	Dave Miley
Venezuela	Tigres de Aragua	3	3	.500	1	Buddy Bailey
Mexico	Yaquis de Obregón	2	4	.333	2	Eddie Díaz

== Individual leaders ==
Player	Statistic
Pablo Ozuna (DOM)	Batting average	.421
Andy Dirks (DOM)	Runs	4
César Suárez (VEN)	Hits	9
Andy Dirks (DOM); Jesús Feliciano (PUR); Luis Hernández (VEN); Miguel Rojas (VEN); Carlos Valencia (MEX)	Doubles	2
Jorge Cortés (VEN); Karim García (MEX); Julio Lugo (DOM)	Triples	1
Héctor Giménez (VEN); Luis Jiménez (VEN); César Suárez (VEN)	Home runs	1
Luis Jiménez (VEN)	RBI	4
José_Constanza (DOM)	Stolen bases	3
Twelve pitchers tied	Wins	1
Nelson Figueroa (PUR)	Strikeouts	10
Yorman Bazardo (VEN); Francisco Liriano (DOM); Yohan Pino (VEN)	ERA	0.00
Nelson Figueroa (PUR)	Innings pitched	14.0
Jairo Asencio (DOM)	Saves	3

== All-Star Team ==
Name	Position
Iker Franco (MEX)	catcher
Héctor Giménez (VEN)	first baseman
Pablo Ozuna (DOM)	second baseman
Luis Figueroa (PUR)	third baseman
Miguel Rojas (VEN)	shortstop
Jesús Feliciano (PUR)	left fielder
Adonis García (VEN)	center fielder
Andy Dirks (DOM)	right fielder
Luis Jiménez (VEN)	designated hitter
Nelson Figueroa (PUR)	right handed starting pitcher
Raúl Valdés (DOM)	left handed starting pitcher
Jairo Asencio (DOM)	relief pitcher
Awards
Jairo Asencio (DOM)	Most Valuable Player
Ken Oberkfell (DOM)	Manager

== Scoreboards ==
=== Game 1, February 2 ===
Team	1	2	3	4	5	6	7	8	9	R	H	E
Venezuela	1	0	0	0	0	0	0	0	0	1	9	1
Puerto Rico	0	2	0	0	0	0	0	1	x	3	7	2
WP: Nelson Figueroa (1-0) LP: Seth Etherton (0-1) Sv: John Lujan (1); Boxscore

=== Game 2, February 2 ===
Team	1	2	3	4	5	6	7	8	9	R	H	E
Mexico	0	1	0	0	0	0	0	0	0	1	3	1
Dominican Republic	0	1	1	0	0	0	0	0	x	2	7	1
WP: Kris Johnson (1-0) LP: Luis Mendoza (0-1) Sv: Jairo Asencio (1); Boxscore

=== Game 3, February 3 ===
Team	1	2	3	4	5	6	7	8	9	R	H	E
Puerto Rico	0	0	0	0	0	0	0	0	0	0	4	1
Mexico	0	0	0	2	0	0	0	0	0	2	5	0
WP: Randy Keisler (1-0) LP: Matt DeSalvo (0-1) Sv: Luis Ayala (1); Boxscore

=== Game 4, February 3 ===
Team	1	2	3	4	5	6	7	8	9	10	11	12	13	R	H	E
Dominican Republic	0	0	0	1	1	0	0	0	0	0	0	0	3	5	10	1
Venezuela	0	0	0	0	0	0	2	0	0	0	0	0	0	2	11	2
WP: Merkin Valdez (1–0) LP: Jon Hunton (0–1) Sv: Jairo Asencio (2); Boxscore

=== Game 5, February 4 ===
Team	1	2	3	4	5	6	7	8	9	R	H	E
Venezuela	1	0	0	0	0	1	0	0	0	2	8	3
Mexico	0	0	0	0	1	0	3	0	X	4	7	2
WP: Rolando Valdez (1-0) LP: Brian Sweeney (0-1) Sv: Luis Ayala (2); Boxscore

=== Game 6, February 4 ===
Team	1	2	3	4	5	6	7	8	9	R	H	E
Dominican Republic	0	0	0	1	2	1	3	0	0	7	9	2
Puerto Rico	0	0	0	1	0	0	0	0	0	1	6	3
WP: Raúl Valdés (1-0) LP: Bobby Livingston (0-1) Sv: Ramón García (1); Boxscore

=== Game 7, February 5 ===
Team	1	2	3	4	5	6	7	8	9	R	H	E
Puerto Rico	0	0	0	0	0	0	0	0	0	0	5	2
Venezuela	1	0	0	0	0	0	2	4	X	7	10	1
WP: Yohan Pino (1-0) LP: Hiram Burgos (0-1); Boxscore

=== Game 8, February 5 ===
Team	1	2	3	4	5	6	7	8	9	R	H	E
Dominican Republic	1	0	0	0	0	0	0	0	1	2	4	0
Mexico	0	0	0	0	0	0	0	0	0	0	5	1
WP: Francisco Liriano (1–0) LP: Edgar González (0–1) Sv: Jairo Asencio (3); Boxscore

=== Game 9, February 6 ===
Team	1	2	3	4	5	6	7	8	9	R	H	E
Mexico	1	0	2	0	0	0	0	0	0	3	8	1
Puerto Rico	0	0	2	0	0	0	0	1	1	4	7	1
WP: Nelvin Fuentes (1-0) LP: Luis Ayala (0-1); Boxscore

=== Game 10, February 6 ===
Team	1	2	3	4	5	6	7	8	9	R	H	E
Venezuela	0	1	1	0	4	0	0	1	0	7	10	0
Dominican Republic	0	0	0	0	0	0	0	0	0	0	5	1
WP: Yorman Bazardo (1-0) LP: Aneury Rodríguez (0-1); Home runs: VEN: Luis Jiménez (1), Héctor Giménez (1); DOM: None; Boxscore

=== Game 11, February 7 ===
Team	1	2	3	4	5	6	7	8	9	R	H	E
Mexico	0	0	2	0	0	0	0	0	0	2	4	0
Venezuela	0	0	0	2	4	0	0	0	x	6	11	0
WP: Pedro Guerra (1-0) LP: Oswaldo Martínez (0-1); Home runs: MEX: None; VEN: César Suárez (1); Boxscore

=== Game 12, February 7 ===
Team	1	2	3	4	5	6	7	8	9	R	H	E
Puerto Rico	1	0	0	0	0	1	0	0	1	3	9	1
Dominican Republic	1	0	0	0	0	0	0	0	0	1	7	2
WP: José de la Torre (1-0) LP: Ramón García (0-1) Sv: Saúl Rivera (1); Boxscore
