= 2012 in baseball =

The following are the baseball events of the year 2012 throughout the world.

== Champions ==
=== Major League Baseball ===
- Regular Season Champions

League	Eastern Division Champions	Central Division Champions	Western Division Champions	Wild Card Qualifier 1	Wild Card Qualifier 2
American League	New York Yankees	Detroit Tigers	Oakland Athletics	Texas Rangers	Baltimore Orioles
National League	Washington Nationals	Cincinnati Reds	San Francisco Giants	Atlanta Braves	St. Louis Cardinals

- Postseason

Wild Card Game (ALWC, NLWC)
4	Texas	0
5	Baltimore	1
4	Atlanta	0
5	St. Louis	1

Division Series (ALDS, NLDS)
1	NY Yankees	3
5	Baltimore	2
American League
2	Oakland	2
3	Detroit	3
1	Washington	2
5	St. Louis	3
National League
2	Cincinnati	2
3	San Francisco	3

League Championship Series (ALCS, NLCS)
1	NY Yankees	0
3	Detroit	4
5	St. Louis	3
3	San Francisco	4

World Series
AL3	Detroit	0
NL3	San Francisco	4

=== Other Champions ===
- Minor League Baseball
  - AAA
    - Championship: Reno Aces (Arizona Diamondbacks)
      - International League: Pawtucket Red Sox (Boston Red Sox)
      - Pacific Coast League: Reno Aces (Arizona Diamondbacks)
    - Mexican League: Rojos del Águila de Veracruz
  - AA
    - Eastern League: Akron Aeros (Cleveland Indians)
    - Southern League: Mobile BayBears (Arizona Diamondbacks)
    - Texas League: Springfield Cardinals (St. Louis Cardinals)
  - A
    - California League: Lancaster JetHawks (Houston Astros)
    - Carolina League: Lynchburg Hillcats (Atlanta Braves)
    - Florida State League: Lakeland Flying Tigers (Detroit Tigers)
    - Midwest League: Wisconsin Timber Rattlers (Milwaukee Brewers)
    - South Atlantic League: Asheville Tourists (Colorado Rockies)
    - New York–Penn League: Hudson Valley Renegades (Tampa Bay Rays)
    - Northwest League: Vancouver Canadians (Toronto Blue Jays)
  - Rookie
    - Appalachian League: Elizabethton Twins (Minnesota Twins)
    - Gulf Coast League: GCL Pirates (Pittsburgh Pirates)
    - Pioneer League: Missoula Osprey (Arizona Diamondbacks)
    - Arizona League: AZL Rangers (Texas Rangers)
  - Arizona Fall League: Peoria Javelinas
- Independent baseball leagues
  - American Association: Winnipeg Goldeyes
  - Atlantic League: Long Island Ducks
  - CanAm League: Quebec Capitales
  - Freedom Pro Baseball League: Copper State Prospectors
  - Frontier League: Southern Illinois Miners
  - North American League: San Rafael Pacifics (North Division); Edinburg Roadrunners (South Division)
  - Pecos League: Alpine Cowboys
- Amateur
  - College
    - College World Series: Arizona
    - NCAA Division II: West Chester
    - NCAA Division III: Marietta
    - NAIA: Tennessee Wesleyan
- Youth
  - Big League World Series: San Juan, Puerto Rico
  - Junior League World Series: Rockledge, Florida
  - Little League World Series: Tokyo, Japan
  - Senior League World Series: Guatemala City, Guatemala
- International
  - National teams
    - European Baseball Championship: Italy
    - Women's World Cup: Japan
  - International club team competitions
    - Asia Series: Yomiuri Giants (Japan)
    - Caribbean Series: Leones del Escogido (Dominican Republic)
    - European Champion Cup Final Four: Fortitudo Bologna (Italy)
  - Domestic leagues
    - Australian Baseball League: Perth Heat
    - Cuban National Series: Ciego de Ávila
    - Dominican League: Leones del Escogido
    - France – Division Elite: Rouen Huskies
    - Holland Series: Corendon Kinheim
    - Italian Baseball Series: T&A San Marino
    - Japan Series: Yomiuri Giants
      - Pacific League: Hokkaido Nippon-Ham Fighters
      - Central League: Yomiuri Giants
    - Korea Series: Samsung Lions
    - Mexican League: Yaquis de Obregón
    - Puerto Rican League: Indios de Mayagüez
    - Taiwan Series: Lamigo Monkeys
    - Venezuelan League: Tigres de Aragua

== Awards and honors ==
- Woman Executive of the Year (major or minor league): Darlene Giardina, Rochester Red Wings, International League

=== Major League Baseball ===
BBWAA awards

- Baseball Hall of Fame honors
  - Barry Larkin was elected by the Baseball Writers' Association of America and subsequently inducted.
  - Ron Santo was elected by the Veterans Committee and subsequently inducted.
  - Bob Elliott received the J. G. Taylor Spink Award for excellence in writing.
  - Tim McCarver received the Ford C. Frick Award for excellence in broadcasting.
- MVP Award
  - American League – Miguel Cabrera, DET
  - National League – Buster Posey, SF
- Cy Young Award
  - American League – David Price, TB
  - National League – R. A. Dickey, NYM
- Rookie of the Year
  - American League – Mike Trout, LAA
  - National League – Bryce Harper, WSH
- Manager of the Year Award
  - American League – Bob Melvin, OAK
  - National League – Davey Johnson, WSH

Major League Baseball awards

- Delivery Man of the Year Award: Fernando Rodney, TB
- Comeback Player of the Year: Fernando Rodney, TB (AL); Buster Posey, SF (NL)
- Roberto Clemente Award: Clayton Kershaw, LAD
- Hank Aaron Award: Miguel Cabrera, DET (AL); Buster Posey, SF (NL)
- All-Star Game MVP: Melky Cabrera, SF
- League Championship Series MVP: Delmon Young, DET (AL); Marco Scutaro, SF (NL)
- World Series MVP: Pablo Sandoval, SF

Sporting News Awards

- Player of the Year: Miguel Cabrera, DET
- Rookie of the Year: Mike Trout, LAA (AL); Wade Miley, AZ (NL)
- Comeback Player of the Year: Adam Dunn, CWS (AL); Buster Posey, SF (NL)
- Manager of the Year: Buck Showalter, BAL (AL); Davey Johnson, WSH (NL)
- Executive of the Year: Billy Beane, OAK

Players Choice Awards

- Player of the Year: Miguel Cabrera, DET
- Marvin Miller Man of the Year: Chipper Jones, ATL
- Outstanding Players: Miguel Cabrera, DET (AL); Andrew McCutchen, PIT, (NL)
- Outstanding Pitchers: David Price, TB (AL); R. A. Dickey, NYM (NL)
- Outstanding Rookies: Mike Trout, LAA (AL); Todd Frazier, CIN (NL)
- Comeback Players of the Year: Adam Dunn, CWS (AL); Buster Posey, SF (NL)

Silver Slugger Awards

American League			National League
Player	Team	Position	Player	Team
Billy Butler	Kansas City Royals	DH / Pitcher	Stephen Strasburg	Washington Nationals
A. J. Pierzynski	Chicago White Sox	Catcher	Buster Posey	San Francisco Giants
Prince Fielder	Detroit Tigers	1st baseman	Adam LaRoche	Washington Nationals
Robinson Canó	New York Yankees	2nd baseman	Aaron Hill	Arizona Diamondbacks
Miguel Cabrera	Detroit Tigers	3rd baseman	Chase Headley	San Diego Padres
Derek Jeter	New York Yankees	Shortstop	Ian Desmond	Washington Nationals
Josh Hamilton	Texas Rangers	Outfielder	Ryan Braun	Milwaukee Brewers
Mike Trout	Los Angeles Angels	Outfielder	Jay Bruce	Cincinnati Reds
Josh Willingham	Minnesota Twins	Outfielder	Andrew McCutchen	Pittsburgh Pirates

Gold Glove Awards

American League			National League
Player	Team	Position	Player	Team
Hellickson/Peavy	TB Rays/CHI White Sox	Pitcher	Mark Buehrle	Miami Marlins
Matt Wieters	Baltimore Orioles	Catcher	Yadier Molina	St. Louis Cardinals
Mark Teixeira	New York Yankees	1st baseman	Adam LaRoche	Washington Nationals
Robinson Canó	New York Yankees	2nd baseman	Darwin Barney	Chicago Cubs
Adrián Beltré	Texas Rangers	3rd baseman	Chase Headley	San Diego Padres
J. J. Hardy	Baltimore Orioles	Shortstop	Jimmy Rollins	Philadelphia Phillies
Alex Gordon	Kansas City Royals	Left fielder	Carlos González	Colorado Rockies
Adam Jones	Baltimore Orioles	Center fielder	Andrew McCutchen	Pittsburgh Pirates
Josh Reddick	Oakland Athletics	Right fielder	Jason Heyward	Atlanta Braves

Other awards

- Babe Ruth Award – Pablo Sandoval, SF
- Branch Rickey Award: R. A. Dickey, NYM
- Hutch Award: Barry Zito, SF
- Luis Aparicio Award: Miguel Cabrera, DET
- Rolaids Relief Man Award: Jim Johnson, BAL (AL); Craig Kimbrel, ATL (NL)
- Warren Spahn Award: Gio González, WSH

=== Minor League Baseball ===
- Baseball America Minor League Player of the Year Award: Wil Myers, Omaha (KC)
- USA Today Minor League Player of the Year Award: Wil Myers, Omaha (KC)
- International League MVP: Mauro Gomez, Pawtucket (BOS)
- Pacific Coast League MVP: Bryan LaHair, Iowa (CHC)

== Events ==
=== January ===
- January 6 – The Chicago Cubs acquired Anthony Rizzo and Zach Cates from the San Diego Padres in exchange for Andrew Cashner and minor leaguer Kyung-Min Na.
- January 9 – former Cincinnati Reds shortstop Barry Larkin is the only player elected to the Baseball Hall of Fame, getting 86.4 percent of the vote by the Baseball Writers' Association of America (BBWAA). He would later be honored July 22 in Cooperstown, along with the late Ron Santo, who is elected by the Golden Era Committee. The day before the induction ceremony, the Hall presented Toronto Sun baseball writer Bob Elliott, with the BBWAA's J.G. Taylor Spink Award and Tim McCarver with its own Ford C. Frick Award.
- January 12 – Major League owners vote to approve a contract extension for two years for commissioner Bud Selig through the 2014 season.
- January 13 – In a cost-efficient effort to bolster the rotation, prized New York Yankees catching prospect Jesús Montero and pitcher Héctor Noesí are traded to the Seattle Mariners in exchange for power-pitching right hander Michael Pineda and minor leaguer José Campos. The Yankees build upon the trade agreement in a matter of hours with the addition of free agent Hiroki Kuroda to a one-year deal worth around 10 million dollars.
- January 17 – At White House, President Barack Obama dubs the St. Louis Cardinals the "greatest comeback team in the history of baseball" thanks to their thrilling late-season charge into the playoffs and death-defying, seven-game triumph in last November's World Series. Leading off at the event is First Lady Michelle Obama, celebrating her 48th birthday. Two key figures of the championship season are absent: Manager Tony La Russa retired after the series, while star Albert Pujols signed a $240 million contract with the Los Angeles Angels in the offseason.

=== February ===
- February 6 – Dominican Republic's Leones del Escogido are soundly defeated by Venezuela's Tigres de Aragua, 7–0, but still clinched the 2012 Caribbean Series title when Mexico's Yaquis de Obregón loses to Puerto Rico's Indios de Mayagüez in the early game, 4–3, to play itself out of contention.
- February 23 – 2011 National League MVP Ryan Braun wins his appeal against a 50-game suspension. The suspension was overturned by baseball arbitrator Shyam Das. The Braun case marks the first time a big leaguer has successfully challenged a drug-related penalty in a grievance. According to ESPN sources, Major League Baseball is weighing the possibility of suing in federal court to reverse the decision.

=== March ===
- March 2 – Major League Baseball expands its playoff format to 10 teams for the 2012 season, adding a second wild card in each league. The decision establishes a new one-game, wild-card round in each league between the teams with the best records.
- March 16 – Andy Pettitte comes out of retirement to a $2.5 million deal with the New York Yankees.
- March 23 – The Chicago White Sox release Delwyn Young.
- March 28 – At Tokyo Dome, Japanese baseball legend Ichiro Suzuki has four hits and drives in a run, leading the Seattle Mariners to a 3–1 win over the Oakland Athletics in Major League Baseball season opener.
- March 30 – At the age of 49, Jamie Moyer becomes the oldest starting pitcher ever on an Opening Day roster. Moyer joined the Colorado Rockies on this date, which was the 20th anniversary of his being released by the Chicago Cubs. At that time, he had been released three times in three years. He would turn 50 in November 2012.

=== April ===
- April 4 – The St. Louis Cardinals defeat the Miami Marlins 4–1 in the first regular-season game at Marlins Park. The ceremonial first pitch is thrown by Muhammad Ali, who won his first of three heavyweight boxing championships by defeating Sonny Liston in Miami in 1964. The game marks Mike Matheny's managerial debut; he replaced Tony La Russa, who retired after managing the Cardinals to the 2011 World Series title.
- April 5 – The longest MLB Opening Day game is played, with the Toronto Blue Jays defeating the Cleveland Indians, 7–4, at Progressive Field in 16 innings. A three-run homer by J. P. Arencibia marks the difference. The marathon eclipses the previous longest openers – 15 innings between Cleveland and the Detroit Tigers on April 19, 1960, and 15 innings between the Philadelphia Athletics and the Washington Senators on April 13, 1926.
- April 7
  - Rajai Davis hits a two-run double in the 12th inning, as the Toronto Blue Jays rally for the second straight game against Cleveland Indians' bullpen, to win in extra innings again, by the same score of 7–4.
  - Robin Ventura earns his first career victory as a manager, as the Chicago White Sox defeat the two-time defending American League champion Texas Rangers, 4–3, at Rangers Ballpark in Arlington.
- April 8 – The Boston Red Sox lose to the Detroit Tigers, 13–12, while the New York Yankees are defeated by the Tampa Bay Rays, 3–0. These results mark the second time in Major League history that both the Red Sox and Yankees started with a 0–3 record. The other was in the 1966 season, in which Boston started 0–5 and finished next-to-last with a 72–90 record, and New York started 0–3 and finished last with a 70–89 record.
- April 10 – The Miami Marlins suspend manager Ozzie Guillén for five games because of his controversial comments about Fidel Castro.
- April 13
  - The Boston Red Sox begin their 101st season at Fenway Park by winning their eighth straight home opener, 12–2, over the Tampa Bay Rays.
  - Los Angeles Dodgers pitcher Aaron Harang sets a franchise record by striking out nine consecutive batters against the San Diego Padres. The Dodgers go on to win 9–8. Harang falls one strikeout short of the all-time major league record of 10 set by Hall of Famer Tom Seaver of the New York Mets on April 22, 1970, also against San Diego. Harang breaks the 50-year-old Dodgers mark of eight consecutive strikeouts, which was recorded by Johnny Podres against the Philadelphia Phillies on July 2, 1962.
- April 17 – At Coors Field, Colorado Rockies pitcher Jamie Moyer, at 49 years 5 months, becomes the oldest pitcher to record a Major League victory as the Rockies defeat the San Diego Padres 5–3. The previous record was held by Jack Quinn, who recorded his last Major League victory in 1932, two months after his 49th birthday.
- April 18
  - Bartolo Colón of the Oakland A's pitches eight shutout innings in a 6–0 win over the Los Angeles Angels. The game includes a stretch, from the fifth to the eight inning, in which Colon pitches 38 consecutive strikes, the longest such streak since major league baseball began recording the statistic in 1988.
  - Cliff Lee of the Philadelphia Phillies scatters seven hits over 10 innings against the San Francisco Giants to become the first starting pitcher to throw ten shutout innings since Mark Mulder of the St. Louis Cardinals in 2005. Giants starter Matt Cain, meanwhile, allows only two hits until being lifted for a pinch-hitter after 9 innings. The two become the first pair of starting pitchers to combine for at least 19 shutout innings since 1999. The Giants win the game 1–0 in walk-off fashion in the bottom of the 11th inning.
- April 19 – Jose Altuve, Brian Bogusevic, and Matt Downs of the Houston Astros each hit a triple in the top of the first inning in an 11–4 victory over the Washington Nationals. This was the first time in Astros history that they hit 3 triples in an inning and also tied the club record for most in a game. 1995 was the last time a team had 3 triples in the first inning.
- April 20 – Fenway Park celebrates its 100th birthday, with about 200 former Boston Red Sox players, managers and coaches coming out for the pre-game introduction. Among those players are first baseman Bill Buckner (who famously let a ground ball get past him in Game 6 of the 1986 World Series), pitcher Pedro Martinez, and first baseman (and current MLB Network analyst) Kevin Millar (who famously drew the walk that started Boston's epic comeback in the 2004 ALCS). The New York Yankees, however, spoil the party and defeat the Red Sox 6–2 on five home runs, all off starter Clay Buchholz. One of the home runs is Alex Rodriguez' 631st and puts him past former teammate Ken Griffey Jr. for fifth place on the all-time list. In the first game at Fenway exactly 100 years earlier, the Red Sox had defeated the Yankees' forerunner, the New York Highlanders, 7–6 in 11 innings.
- April 21
  - At Safeco Field, Philip Humber pitches the first perfect game in the majors in almost two years, leading the Chicago White Sox to a 4–0 victory over the Seattle Mariners. It is the 21st perfect game in major league history and first since the Philadelphia Phillies' Roy Halladay threw one against the Florida Marlins on May 29, 2010. It is also the third in White Sox history, joining Mark Buehrle against the Tampa Bay Rays on July 23, 2009, and Charles Robertson against the Detroit Tigers on April 30, 1922.
  - At Fenway Park, the New York Yankees tie a franchise record by overcoming a nine-run deficit to defeat the Boston Red Sox, 15–9. Trailing 9–0 after five innings, the Yankees begin their comeback in the sixth inning on the first of Mark Teixeira's two home runs, which come from both sides of the plate, the 13th time he has done so. The Yankees score seven runs in the seventh on a Nick Swisher grand slam, followed by Teixeira's second home run; then another seven runs in the eighth inning, with the tying and go-ahead runs scored by Eduardo Núñez and Derek Jeter on a Swisher double. Teixeira and Swisher each drive in six runs for the Yankees, who last overcame a nine-run deficit to win on June 26, 1987, also against the Red Sox.
- April 25
  - Paul Konerko of the Chicago White Sox becomes the 48th player in major league history to join the 400-home run club with a solo shot against the Oakland Athletics at O.co Coliseum.
  - David Wright hit a two-run home run off Mark Buehrle in the 6th inning, guiding the New York Mets to a 5–1 victory over the Miami Marlins. With his two runs batted in, Wright becomes the all-time RBI leader in Mets franchise history with 735, passing Darryl Strawberry. Knuckle baller R. A. Dickey is credited as the winning pitcher. In addition, the Marlins becomes the first team in MLB history to walk four consecutive batters using four consecutive pitchers, when Josh Johnson, Randy Choate, Steve Cishek and Mike Dunn throws free passes to Lucas Duda, Justin Turner, Scott Hairston and Josh Thole, respectively.
- April 26
  - Pablo Sandoval of the San Francisco Giants goes 1-for-5, extending his season-opening hitting streak to 19 games, a franchise record. Sandoval enters the game tied with Johnny Rucker, who hit in the first 18 games of the 1945 season with the then-New York Giants.
  - The New York Mets field an entire starting lineup of home-grown talent for the first time since September 19, 1971. With former Mets farmhand José Reyes batting lead-off for the Miami Marlins, all ten players on the field at the game's start began their careers with the Mets.
- April 27 – Ryan Cook of the Oakland Athletics becomes the 60th pitcher in MLB history to strike out four batters in an inning. J. J. Hardy, Nick Markakis, Adam Jones, and Matt Wieters of the Baltimore Orioles each strike out swinging in the bottom of the eighth inning, with Jones reaching first base as the result of a third-strike wild pitch.

=== May ===
- May 2 – At Angel Stadium of Anaheim, Jered Weaver of the Los Angeles Angels of Anaheim no-hits the Minnesota Twins 9–0. Weaver strikes out nine and allows only two baserunners: Chris Parmelee, who strikes out in the second inning but reaches on a passed ball, and Josh Willingham, who walks in the seventh. The no-hitter is the first against the Twins since David Wells' perfect game in 1998, and the fifth time they've been held hitless.
- May 3:
  - Mariano Rivera tears a ligament in his right knee before the New York Yankees lose 4–3 to the Kansas City Royals at Kauffman Stadium.
  - Cincinnati Reds starter Homer Bailey celebrates his 26th birthday and Chicago Cubs starter Ryan Dempster celebrates his 35th birthday, marking the first time in Major League history that opposing starting pitchers both celebrated birthdays. The Reds go on to win 4–3 in 10 innings in Cincinnati.
- May 7 – At Fenway Park, the Baltimore Orioles outlast the Boston Red Sox, 9–6, in 17 innings. Adam Jones hits a three-run home run in the top of the 17th off designated hitter Darnell McDonald, whom the Red Sox turn to once their bullpen was empty. Orioles DH Chris Davis, who had never pitched an inning in professional baseball, hurls two innings of shutout ball and is credited with the victory. The last time two teams brought in position players to pitch in the same game was on October 4, 1925, when the Detroit Tigers' center fielder Ty Cobb and the St. Louis Browns' first baseman George Sisler closed out the second game of a doubleheader on the last day of the season. Davis also struck out five times at the plate to record the first platinum sombrero of the season, and becomes the eighth player, but first non-pitcher, since 1918 to get a win for a game in which he strikes out five times.
- May 8
  - Josh Hamilton ties the major league record by hitting four home runs, all of them two-run shots with shortstop Elvis Andrus on base, as he went five-for-five in the Texas Rangers' 10–3 win over the Baltimore Orioles at Camden Yards. It marks the 16th four-home-run game in major league history, and the 6th in the American League. Hamilton adds a double for his third hit of the game in amassing a career-high eight runs batted in. His 18 total bases in the game breaks the club record set by José Canseco in 1994 against the Seattle Mariners, sets a new league record and is one shy of the major league record posted by Shawn Green in the 2002 season.
  - Class-A Greenville Drive (Boston) makes history as three pitchers combine to toss the club's first ever no-hitter. Miguel Pena (six innings), Hunter Cervenka (two) and Tyler Lockwood (one) join forces to defeat the Rome Braves (Atlanta), 1–0. A solo home run by Keury De La Cruz off David Filak in the sixth inning counts for the only run of the game.
- May 13 – Joey Votto hits three home runs, including a walk-off grand slam with two outs in the 9th inning, in the Cincinnati Reds' 9–6 victory over the Washington Nationals. Votto, who racks up six RBI and 14 total bases in the game, is the first player ever to have hit three home runs which include a walk-off grand slam, in a game.
- May 14 – Major League Baseball drops its 100-game suspension of Colorado Rockies catcher Eliezer Alfonzo for a positive drug test because of the same procedural issues that came up in the Ryan Braun case. Alfonzo became the first player suspended twice for performance-enhancing drugs under the MLB testing program when the commissioner's office announced a 100-game penalty in September 2011. Alfonzo appealed, culminating in today's decision. The reversal comes about because the storage and shipment of his urine sample was similar to those leading to Braun's 50-game drug penalty getting overturned by an arbitrator in February.
- May 16 – New York Mets COO Jeff Wilpon, MLB Commissioner Bud Selig, NYC mayor Michael Bloomberg and owner Fred Wilpon announce that the 2013 All-Star Game will be held at Citi Field.
- May 17
  - Yan Gomes starts at third base for the Toronto Blue Jays, becoming the first Brazilian-born player in major league history. Born in São Paulo, Gomes goes 2-for-3 in a 4–1 victory over the New York Yankees at the Rogers Centre.
  - Former Boston Red Sox manager Butch Hobson, now heading the Lancaster Barnstormers in the Atlantic League, becomes the 20th manager in baseball history to reach 1,500 career victories with the club's win.
- May 18 – At Comerica Park, Justin Verlander has his bid for a third career no-hitter broken up with one out in the ninth inning of the Detroit Tigers' 6–0 interleague victory over the Pittsburgh Pirates. A single by Josh Harrison foils this bid and will be the only hit Verlander allows. Verlander, who had already pitched an interleague no-hitter against the Milwaukee Brewers in 2007, as well as a no-hitter against the Toronto Blue Jays in 2011, was bidding to join Larry Corcoran, Cy Young, Bob Feller, Sandy Koufax and Nolan Ryan as pitchers who had thrown three Major League no-hitters. The no-hitter would also have been the first pitched against the Pirates since Bob Gibson no-hit them in 1971.
- May 20
  - Mike Avilés hits a home run on the second pitch he saw from Cliff Lee, to become the first Boston Red Sox player in 99 years to lead off consecutive games with a home run, joining Hall of Famer Harry Hooper, who did it in the 1913 season. Josh Beckett hurls seven scoreless innings and Avilés also singles in a run in the 5–1 victory over the Philadelphia Phillies at Citizens Bank Park.
  - Max Scherzer of the Detroit Tigers strikes out 15 batters in seven innings of work and the Tigers top the Pittsburgh Pirates, 4–3, at Comerica Park. Scherzer's 15 strikeouts are the most by a Tigers pitcher in 40 years. Mickey Lolich had 15 strikeouts against the Boston Red Sox on October 2, 1972. Previously, Lolich set the club record of 16 during the 1969 season, doing it twice in less than three weeks.
- May 21 – In Double-A action, three New Hampshire Fisher Cats (TOR) pitchers combine to throw the third no-hitter in franchise history, stifling the Portland Sea Dogs (BOS) in a 6–0 victory at New Hampshire. Combining on the gem for the Fisher Cats were Brett Cecil (5 2/3 innings), Danny Farquhar (2 1/3), and Ronald Uviedo (1). It is the first no-hitter for New Hampshire since Kyle Drabek hurled a complete-game, nine-inning ho-hitter against the New Britain Rock Cats (MIN) on July 4, 2010.
- May 26 – Jarrod Saltalamacchia has a pinch-hit two-run home run off Fernando Rodney with one out in the bottom of the ninth inning, to lift the Boston Red Sox to a 3–2 win over the Tampa Bay Rays at Fenway Park. It is the first walk-off home run of Saltalamacchia's career, while Rodney suffers the first blown save of the season after a perfect 15-for-15 in save opportunities.
- May 28 – Chris Sale strikes out a career-high 15, Adam Dunn hits a two-run home run, and the Chicago White Sox extend their winning streak to six games with a 2–1 victory over the Tampa Bay Rays at Tropicana Field. Sale nearly makes White Sox history in a dominating victory, allowing one run on three hits and two walks in 7 1/3 innings, while finishing one strikeout shy of the team record. Jack Harshman struck out 16 Boston Red Sox batters on July 25, 1954.
- May 29 – Hideki Matsui becomes the first player in baseball history to play 10 seasons in Nippon Professional Baseball and 10 seasons in the Major Leagues when he debuts for the Tampa Bay Rays against the Chicago White Sox. Matsui breaks a scoreless tie with a two-run home run in his second at-bat in an eventual loss for the Rays. He also homered in his major league debuts with the Anaheim Angels and the New York Yankees.
- May 30 – Carlos González hits three home runs in his last three at-bats, en route to a Colorado Rockies 13–5 victory over the Houston Astros. González breaks a 5-all tie with a solo shot leading off the bottom of the fifth inning, adds a two-run drive in the sixth, and then has another solo shot in the eighth. Michael Cuddyer contributes a grand slam in the first frame and Dexter Fowler adds a three-run homer in the sixth.

=== June ===
- June 1:
  - Major League Baseball announces the introduction of a new qualifying round for the 2013 World Baseball Classic which will expand the competitive field from 16 to 28 countries. The new round will feature 16 teams divided into four pools of four teams each. The teams invited to participate will include the four World Baseball Classic teams from 2009 that did not win a game.
  - After 50 seasons and 8,020 games, the New York Mets record their first no-hitter as Johan Santana performs the deed in the Mets' 8–0 victory over the St. Louis Cardinals at Citi Field. Santana is assisted in the sixth inning by a foul ball call on a Carlos Beltrán line drive over third base that appears to land on the chalk line (Beltrán eventually grounds out to third baseman David Wright) and by Mike Baxter's seventh-inning catch to rob Yadier Molina of a possible extra-base hit. The no-hitter leaves the San Diego Padres, who began play in 1969, as the only remaining team without a no-hitter, and is the first against a defending World Series champion since Nolan Ryan no-hit the Oakland Athletics on June 11, 1990.
  - At Coors Field, a record five players whose fathers had played Major League Baseball are in the Los Angeles Dodgers starting lineup. Tony Gwynn Jr. (son of Tony Sr.), Iván DeJesús Jr. (son of Iván Sr.), Jerry Hairston Jr. (son of Jerry Sr.), Scott Van Slyke (son of Andy Van Slyke) and Dee Gordon (son of Tom Gordon) are in the starting lineup for the Dodgers' game against the Colorado Rockies, which Colorado wins 13–3. It is also the first time the starting infield consists of four players whose fathers had played Major League Baseball: Van Slyke at first base, Hairston at second base, Gordon at shortstop and DeJesús at third base.
- June 3 – Magglio Ordóñez officially announces his retirement at Comerica Park. A six-time All-Star, the 38-year-old Ordóñez finishes his career with a .309 batting average over 15 seasons with the Detroit Tigers and the Chicago White Sox. His 294 career home runs are the second-most by a Venezuela-born player, trailing only Andrés Galarraga's 399. His highlights include the pennant-winning home run in Game 4 of the 2006 AL Championship Series. Then, in 2007 he became the first Tiger to win the batting crown in 46 years. Ordóñez posted a .363 average to claim the American League title, including 28 home runs, 139 runs batted in and a league-best 54 doubles, while his .363 average was the highest by a Detroit player since 1937, when Charlie Gehringer finished with a .371 mark.
- June 8 – At Safeco Field, a record-tying six Seattle Mariner pitchers combine to no-hit the Los Angeles Dodgers. Kevin Millwood throws the first six innings before leaving the game with a groin injury; he is relieved by Charlie Furbush, Stephen Pryor (who records his first major league victory), Lucas Luetge and Brandon League, before Tom Wilhelmsen closed out a 1–0 win and was credited with the save. The six pitchers tie a record for most in a combined no-hitter, which was set by six Houston Astros pitchers in no-hitting the New York Yankees during the 2003 season. Millwood, a no-hit pitcher during the 2003 season, becomes the fourth no-hit pitcher to also pitch in a combined no-hitter, joining Vida Blue, Mike Witt and Kent Mercker.
- June 13:
  - At AT&T Park, Matt Cain of the San Francisco Giants pitches the 22nd perfect game in Major League history, and the first in the franchise's history, defeating the Houston Astros 10–0. His 14 strikeouts tie the record for most in a perfect game, set by Sandy Koufax in his perfect game in 1965. Besides this, home plate umpire Ted Barrett becomes the first umpire to call balls and strikes for two perfect games, having also done so for David Cone's perfect game in 1999.
  - At Tropicana Field, R. A. Dickey of the New York Mets breaks Jerry Koosman's 39-year franchise record for consecutive scoreless innings, pitching a one-hitter in defeating the Tampa Bay Rays 9–1. He strikes out a career-high 12 batters and allows a ninth-inning unearned run, which ends his consecutive scoreless inning streak at 32 2/3. Koosman had held the previous franchise record, pitching 31 2/3 consecutive scoreless innings in 1973.
- June 14 – Jim Thome of the Philadelphia Phillies becomes just the fourth player in major league history to hit 100 home runs for three different clubs with his solo shot in a 6–1 victory against the Toronto Blue Jays. He joins Darrell Evans, Reggie Jackson and Alex Rodriguez in that exclusive club. Thome's homer also was his 99th in a Phillies uniform, while his 607 career homers rank him eighth on the all-time list.
- June 16 – The South Division rallies for a 6–3 victory over the North in the 51st annual Florida State League All-Star Game held at Charlotte Sports Park. St. Lucie Mets third baseman Wilmer Flores, who goes 3-for-4 with a run scored, drives in three runs over the final three innings to earn Most Valuable Player honors.
- June 18 – R. A. Dickey hurls his second straight one-hitter in the New York Mets' 5–0 victory over the Baltimore Orioles, to become the first major leaguer in 24 years to do that since Toronto Blue Jays' Dave Stieb in the 1988 season. The knuckleballer also becomes the first pitcher in MLB history to allow no earned runs and strike out at least eight batters in five consecutive starts, while joining Stieb as one of 10 pitchers since 1900 to allow one hit or fewer in consecutive starts. The others are Sam McDowell (CLE, 1966), Jim Tobin (BSN, 1944), Mort Cooper (STL, 1943), Johnny Vander Meer (CIN, 1938 [no-hitters]), Lon Warneke (CHC, 1943), Dazzy Vance (BRO, 1925), Howard Ehmke (BOS, 1923), and Rube Marquard (NYG, 1911).
- June 19:
  - Ichiro Suzuki of the Seattle Mariners records his 2,500th career hit off pitcher Daniel Hudson. Only Hall of Famers Al Simmons, Ty Cobb and George Sisler reached the 2500-hit milestone in fewer games than Suzuki's 1817 Major League contests, as he had already racked up 1278 hits in nine seasons with the Orix BlueWave of the Japanese Pacific League before joining the Mariners in 2001. Suzuki goes 4-for-5, helping Seattle to a 12–9, 10-inning victory against the Arizona Diamondbacks.
  - Melky Cabrera becomes the fastest San Francisco Giants player to collect 100 hits, needing just 291 plate appearances to reach the team's all-time mark. Willie Mays did it in 295 PA in 1958, during the Giants' inaugural season on the West Coast.
- June 23 – Jim Thome continues to make history. This time, Thome belts a solo, pinch-hit home run in the bottom of the ninth inning off Jake McGee to help the Philadelphia Phillies defeat the Tampa Bay Rays, 7–6, at Citizens Bank Park. It is Thome's 609th career home run, tying him with Sammy Sosa for seventh on the all-time list. In addition, Thome becomes the first big leaguer to hit 13 career walk-off home runs, breaking the previous record of 12 he had been sharing with Babe Ruth, Jimmie Foxx, Stan Musial, Mickey Mantle and Frank Robinson.
- June 25 – The Arizona Wildcats end two years of dominance by the South Carolina Gamecocks at the College World Series with a 4–1 victory, delivering the long-awaited national title to Andy Lopez, the coach who took over Arizona's downtrodden program 11 years ago. Robert Refsnyder earned Most Outstanding Player honors for Arizona.
- June 27 – Jarrod Parker of the Oakland Athletics hurls seven dominant innings and a career-high nine strikeouts in a 2–1 victory over the Seattle Mariners at Safeco Field. The 23-year-old rookie joins Dwight Gooden (1984) as the only pitchers to allow one run or fewer in nine of their first 13 starts since the 1918 season.
- June 28 – Óscar Taveras of the Springfield Cardinals collects three hits, including a two-run home run, to lead the North Division to a 3–1 victory over the South Division in the Texas League All-Star Game held at ONEOK Field. Taveras, who is a unanimous choice as the game's Most Valuable Player, is, at the time, the No. 3 prospect in the St. Louis Cardinals organization. His .323 batting average tops the league, while his 15 home runs ranks him third in the circuit.
- June 29 – At Miller Park, Aaron Hill of the Arizona Diamondbacks hits for the cycle in a 9–3 victory over the Milwaukee Brewers. Hill, who had hit for the cycle against the Seattle Mariners eleven days earlier, becomes the first player to hit for two cycles in the same season since Babe Herman in 1931.
- June 30 – The Texas Rangers (50–29) become the first major league team to reach 50 victories with a 7–2 win, its 17th in 21 games. Josh Hamilton homers and drives in four runs to help make 21-year-old Martín Pérez a winner in his first career start.

=== July ===
- July 2:
  - Jarrod Parker allows one run on six hits in 6 2/3 innings of work as the Oakland Athletics pass the Boston Red Sox 6–1 at O.co Coliseum. Parker matches an old record by allowing one run or fewer for the 10th time in 14 career starts, becoming the second pitcher in major league history since Ferdie Schupp to accomplish the feat. Schupp, primarily a reliever, allowed no more than one run in 10 of his first 14 starts for the New York Giants, but he needed five seasons to accomplish it, from 1913 to 1917. Entering the day, Parker had been the second starter since Dwight Gooden to allow no more than one run in nine of his first 13 starts. It is also the seventh time in Parker's past eight starts he has held the opposition to one run or fewer.
  - Billy Hamilton of the High-A Bakersfield Blaze steals his 100th base of the season in just his 78th game of the season. Last year, the Cincinnati Reds minor leaguer became the first player to steal 100 bases in a minor-league season since 2001, ending with 103 in 135 games. According to Baseball America, by this point in the season, only 14 of the 119 full-season minor-league teams (not including Bakersfield) have 100 steals. The record for the most stolen bases at any level of professional baseball is 145, which was set by Vince Coleman in 1983 while playing for the Class-A Macon Redbirds.
- July 4 – David Ortiz of the Boston Red Sox becomes only the 49th member of the 400 home run club, as he blasts a long line drive over the right-field fence against Oakland Athletics right-hander A. J. Griffin in the fourth inning of a game at the O.co Coliseum. The solo shot ties the game at 1–1 and is Ortiz' team-leading 22nd homer of the season.
- July 8 – Detroit Tigers prospect Nick Castellanos has three hits, including a three-run home run during a nine-run sixth inning, while Kansas City Royals minor league outfielder Wil Myers adds three runs batted in to lead the U.S. team to a 17–5 rout of the World team in the All-Star Futures Game at Kauffman Stadium. Billy Hamilton and Manny Machado each drive in two runs for the U.S. team, contributing to a record 22 combined runs during the annual prospect showcase. Castellanos earns MVP honors.
- July 10 – The National League shuts out the American League, 8–0, in the 83rd All-Star Game played in Kansas City's Kaufmann Stadium. NL starting pitcher Matt Cain of the San Francisco Giants throws two shutout innings for the win, while teammates Pablo Sandoval and Melky Cabrera and Milwaukee Brewers' Ryan Braun contribute most of the offensive firepower. Sandoval hits a bases-loaded triple and scores one run during a five-run first inning off the Detroit Tigers' Justin Verlander, while Braun doubles, triples and makes a fine catch in the outfield. Cabrera belts a two-run home run and scores two times to take home the MVP award. The Atlanta Braves' 40-year-old Chipper Jones singles in his final All-Star at-bat as the NL, under retired manager Tony La Russa, once again claims home-field advantage in the World Series.
- July 11:
  - Wil Myers drives in one run and scores another to lead the Pacific Coast League to a 3–0 victory over the International League in the Triple-A All-Star Game. Myers is selected Top Star for the PCL team, which snaps a three-game losing streak. It is the second impressive All-Star showing in four days for the 21-year-old Kansas City Royals outfield prospect. Previously, Myers collected three RBIs in the All-Star Futures Game played during the MLB All-Star festivities.
  - Eric Campbell of the Binghamton Mets lashes a two-out RBI single in the bottom of the ninth inning, to lead the Eastern Division to a 5–4 win over the Western Division in the Eastern League All-Star Game held at FirstEnergy Stadium. Campbell, who earns MVP Game honors, hits .341 over the final 10 games of the first half of the season and is batting .378 in July for the Binghamton team.
- July 17 – O'Koyea Dickson of the Great Lakes Loons puts on a special performance at the Midwest League All-Star Game, leading the East Division to an 18–2 thumping of the West Division at Kane County's Fifth Third Field. Dickson goes 2-for-3 with a two-run home run and two runs scored, and is named Most Valuable Player.
- July 20 – Alfredo Marte of the Mobile BayBears has two hits, including a double, drives in a run and scores another, to capture Most Valuable Player honors in the Southern League All-Star Game as the South division defeated the North, 6–2, at Smokies Park.
- July 21:
  - In the top third inning of a game at Citizens Bank Park in Philadelphia, Matt Cain of the San Francisco Giants hits a home run off Cole Hamels of the Philadelphia Phillies. In the bottom of that same inning, Hamels hits a home run off of Cain. Cain and Hamels become the first pair of starting pitchers to hit home runs off one another in the same game since 2002, and the first pair to do so in the same inning since 1990. San Francisco wins, 6–5, in 10 innings.
  - Jason Kubel becomes the seventh player in Arizona Diamondbacks history to hit three home runs in a game, driving in six runs in a 10–3 victory over the Houston Astros at Chase Field.
- July 22:
  - Miguel Cabrera homers twice, reaching the 300 HR mark for his major league career and helping the Detroit Tigers finish a three-game sweep of the Chicago White Sox with a 6–4 victory at Comerica Park. Cabrera becomes the second Venezuela-born player to reach 300 home runs. Andrés Galarraga hit 399 from 1985 through 2004.
  - Los Angeles Angels rookie outfielder Mike Trout, who leads the American League in batting average (.357), runs (70) and stolen bases (31), goes 5-for-10 with a home run and a triple in the three-game series against the Texas Rangers. His 70 runs scored are an AL rookie record, breaking a mark that had been shared by Jake Powell (1935 Washington Senators) and Don Lenhardt (1950 St. Louis Browns).
- July 23 – The New York Yankees acquire 10-time All-Star outfielder Ichiro Suzuki from the Seattle Mariners for pitching prospects D. J. Mitchell and Danny Farquhar. In another transaction, the Detroit Tigers obtain second baseman Omar Infante, pitcher Aníbal Sánchez, and compensation draft pick round A from the Miami Marlins in exchange for rookie pitcher Jacob Turner, two minor leaguers, and compensation draft pick round B.
- July 25 – The Miami Marlins continue their fire sale by sending infielder Hanley Ramírez and reliever Randy Choate to the Los Angeles Dodgers in exchange for rookie pitcher Nathan Eovaldi and minor league pitching prospect Scott McGough. The Philadelphia Phillies also make a big move by signing starter Cole Hamels to a contract extension. The deal is for a reported six years and worth $144 million.
- July 26:
  - Starling Marte belts a home run in his first major league at-bat on the first pitch he sees, helping the Pittsburgh Pirates to take an early lead en route to a 5–3 win over the Houston Astros at Minute Maid Park. Marte, a prized Dominican prospect, becomes the third player in franchise history to homer in his first major league at-bat and the first to do it since Don Leppert in 1961. No Pirates player has homered on the first major league pitch since Walter Mueller did so in 1922.
  - Matt Harvey of the New York Mets limits the Arizona Diamondbacks to three hits in his major league debut, while striking out 11 over 5 1/3 innings of shutout ball to lead the Mets to a 3–1 victory at Chase Field. Harvey, the Mets' top pick in the 2010 draft, sets a franchise record for strikeouts in a debut. He also doubles and singles to become the first major league pitcher since 1900 to strike out more than 10 and collect a pair of hits in his first game.
- July 29:
  - Pedro Ciriaco turns out to be the hero once again, this time punching an RBI single in the top of the 10th inning, and the Boston Red Sox defeat the New York Yankees, 3–2, to take the weekend series. Called up July 6 from Triple-A Pawtucket, Ciriaco has go-ahead hits in all three Red Sox victories over the Yankees in nine meetings this season. He is now 11-for-22 with six RBIs in five games against New York, including a ninth-inning, RBI-triple the previous day in an 8–6 comeback victory.
  - The Houston Astros end their team-record losing streak at 12 games, beating the Pittsburgh Pirates, 9–5, behind a three-run double from Marwin González and a home run from Jordan Schafer, who also drives in three runs. The skid matches the Kansas City Royals (April 11–24) and the Chicago Cubs (May 15–27) for the longest in the major leagues this year. It breaks the previous Astros record of 11, originally set from August 17 to 28, 1995, and matched from 2009's season end into the start of 2010.
- July 30 – At Rangers Ballpark in Arlington, Kendrys Morales of the Los Angeles Angels of Anaheim becomes the third player to hit a home run from both sides of the plate in the same inning. His first home run, batting left-handed against Texas Rangers pitcher Roy Oswalt, comes with Albert Pujols on base, the first two runs of a nine-run sixth inning. He concludes the scoring by homering again, this time with the bases loaded against left-hander Robbie Ross. The Angels defeat the Rangers, 15–8. Morales joins Carlos Baerga (1993) and Mark Bellhorn (2002) as players who have homered from both sides of the plate in the same inning.

=== August ===
- August 3 – Justin Upton and B. J. Upton become the sixth brother combination to each reach the 100-home run milestone in major league history, and the first to do so on the same day. At Citizens Bank Park, Justin of the Arizona Diamondbacks hits his 100th home run off Kyle Kendrick in the second inning of Arizona's 4–2 victory over the Philadelphia Phillies. Meanwhile, at Tropicana Field, his older brother B. J. of the Tampa Bay Rays hits his milestone home run off Tommy Hunter in the fourth inning of the Rays' 2–0 victory over the Baltimore Orioles. The Uptons join Roberto Alomar–Sandy Alomar Jr. (210–112) Brett Boone–Aaron Boone (252–126), Ken Boyer–Clete Boyer (282–162), Joe DiMaggio–Vince DiMaggio (361–125) and Bob Meusel–Irish Meusel (156–106) as brothers who have each hit 100 career home runs.
- August 8 – Marco Scutaro hits a grand slam and has a career-high seven runs batted in, leading Ryan Vogelsong and the San Francisco Giants to a 15–0 romp over the St. Louis Cardinals at Busch Stadium. Scutaro connects on an RBI single in the third inning, a two-run double in the eighth, and then hits his third career slam in the ninth. At 36 years and 283 days, Scutaro also becomes the oldest player in Giants history with 7 or more RBI in a game. The previous oldest was Phil Weintraub, who had 11 RBI vs. the Brooklyn Dodgers on April 30, 1944 at a younger 36 years old, according to Elias Sports Bureau.
- August 9 – José Reyes of the Florida Marlins goes 0-for-4 against All-Star knuckleballer R. A. Dickey in a 6–1 loss to the New York Mets at Citi Field, ending his career-high hitting streak at 26 games. It is the longest run by a reigning batting champion since Joe DiMaggio's record 56-game streak in 1941.
- August 10 – Manny Machado hits two home runs and drives in four runs in his second career MLB game to carry the Baltimore Orioles past the visiting Kansas City Royals, 7–1, at Camden Yards. At 20 years, 35 days old, Machado becomes the youngest player in major league history to have a multiple home run game in either his first or second career game. The previous youngest player to do this was Manny Ramírez (21 years, 96 days old), who belted two homers in his second career game, at Yankee Stadium on September 3, 1993, leading the Cleveland Indians to a 7–3 win. Machado also becomes the youngest player in Orioles franchise history, which includes the St. Louis Browns from 1902 to 1953, to hit two or more homers in a game. The previous youngest was Boog Powell (20 years, 258 days old), who did it on May 2, 1962, at Metropolitan Stadium.
- August 15:
  - At Safeco Field, Félix Hernández of the Seattle Mariners strikes out 12 batters en route to the 23rd perfect game in Major League history, the third of this season, and the first in franchise history as the Mariners defeat the Tampa Bay Rays 1–0. With Philip Humber having pitched his perfect game against the Mariners at Safeco on April 21 of this season, the Mariners become the first team to be on both ends of a perfect game in one season. Safeco also joins Dodger Stadium, Yankee Stadium and Oakland–Alameda County Coliseum as stadiums with two perfect games pitched in them. The perfect game is the third in four seasons to be pitched against the Rays; they were also on the losing end of Mark Buehrle's perfect game in 2009 and Dallas Braden's perfect game in 2010. The Rays are also no-hit for the fourth time since 2009, having been on the losing end of Edwin Jackson's 2010 no-hitter; no other team has even been no-hit twice during this period. Along with their combined no-hitter on June 8 (also at Safeco), the Mariners become the first team with two no-hitters on the same season since the 1973 California Angels, Nolan Ryan having pitched both.
  - Melky Cabrera of the San Francisco Giants is suspended for 50 games after testing positive for Testosterone. With 45 games remaining in the Giants' regular season, the suspension ends Cabrera's season and will carry over into the postseason should the Giants qualify. Cabrera finishes the year leading the National League with a .346 batting average, but his 501 plate appearances are one short of what he will need to qualify for the batting title.
- August 18 – In the sixth annual Civil Rights Game, the Los Angeles Dodgers defeat the Atlanta Braves, 6–2, at Turner Field in Atlanta.
- August 21:
  - Billy Hamilton of the Pensacola Blue Wahoos collects four stolen bases in the first game of a double-header, to eclipse Vince Coleman's 30-year-old record for the most steals in a single season in minor league baseball history. Hamilton, a highly touted prospect of the Cincinnati Reds organization, now has 147 stolen bases in the season. He stole 104 in the first half of the season with Class-A Bakersfield Blaze before being promoted to Double-A Pensacola. The previous record was set by Coleman in 1983, with 145, while playing for Single-A Macon Redbirds. The modern major league record was set by Rickey Henderson with 130 in 1982. Hamilton will eventually end the season with 155 steals.
  - Michael Weiner, who succeeded Donald Fehr as head of the baseball players' union three years before and negotiated a labor deal the prior fall in a seamless transition, undergoes treatment for a brain tumor. The 50-year-old Weiner succeeded Fehr in December 2009 to become just the fourth head of the union since 1966.
- August 22 – Bartolo Colón of the Oakland Athletics is suspended for 50 games after testing positive for testosterone, joining San Francisco Giants outfielder Melky Cabrera on the suspended list for the rest of the regular season. Major League Baseball makes the announcement regarding the former Cy Young Award winner just a week after All-Star Game MVP Cabrera received his 50-game suspension.
- August 25:
  - The Boston Red Sox and the Los Angeles Dodgers complete a nine-player blockbuster deal, which is considered the largest player transaction in major league baseball history after the non-waiver trade deadline. Boston sends first baseman Adrián González, pitcher Josh Beckett, outfielder Carl Crawford, infielder Nick Punto, and about $11 million in cash to Los Angeles in the nine-player trade, while the Dodgers absorb approximately a quarter-billion dollars while acquiring the four players. In return, the Red Sox will receive first baseman James Loney, pitcher Allen Webster, infielder Iván DeJesús Jr. and two players to be named, while shedding more than $250 million in salaries through 2018. Pitcher Rubby De La Rosa and outfielder Jerry Sands are the players to be named later because they did not clear waivers. They will officially change organizations once the regular season concludes.
  - Former Major League pitcher Roger Clemens starts a game for the Sugar Land Skeeters of the independent Atlantic League. The 50-year-old Clemens pitches 3 1/3 innings, striking out two and allowing only one base hit.
- August 27 – Adrián Beltré of the Texas Rangers is named the American League Player of the Week. Beltré makes history, after hitting .433 with three doubles, one triple, five home runs, nine RBI and seven runs scored in seven games. He belted three home runs in his first three at-bats on August 22 against the Baltimore Orioles, including a pair of two-run blasts as part of a nine-run fourth inning. He also homered against the Minnesota Twins the next day, marking the first time he had homered in back-to-back games this season. A day later, he became the sixth Rangers player to hit for the cycle, going 4-for-4 with three RBI. It was his second career cycle (September 1, 2008, with the Seattle Mariners – also in Rangers Ballpark – was the other), so Beltré became the first player in the modern era to cycle in the same ballpark as a home and visiting player, according to the Elias Sports Bureau. Beltré, who joins Joe DiMaggio (1948) as the only other player in Major League Baseball history to hit for the cycle and hit three homers in the same week, earns his first AL Player of the Week honor after being recognized three times while in the National League with the Los Angeles Dodgers.
- August 28 – First baseman Mauro Gómez is named International League Most Valuable Player, in a season during which he made four separate trips between Triple-A Pawtucket and the Boston Red Sox. Gómez hit a .310 average in 100 games with Pawtucket, with 59 of his 120 hits going for extra bases. He also tied for second in the International League with 24 home runs, while ranking first in slugging percentage (.589) and fourth both in RBIs (74) and total bases (228). Besides this, Tyler Cloyd of Lehigh Valley IronPigs (Phillies) was voted Most Valuable Pitcher, Scranton/Wilkes Barre Yankees Dave Miley was named Manager of the Year, and first baseman Ernesto Mejía became the third consecutive Gwinnett Braves player to claim the Rookie of the Year distinction, following 1B Freddie Freeman (2010) and P Julio Teherán (2011).
- August 29 – Little League Baseball announces that Australia will receive an automatic berth in the Little League World Series starting in 2013. Australia, now the fourth-largest country in Little League participation (and the largest outside North America), becomes the fourth country with its own berth (alongside Canada, Japan, and Mexico).
- August 30 – Jonathan Lucroy hits a grand slam and drove in seven runs for the Milwaukee Brewers in their loss to the Chicago Cubs, 12–11, at Wrigley Field. In a slugfest featuring a combined 31 hits, including 15 extra-bases, Lucroy becomes the first catcher to have two games in a single season with 7 or more RBI since Major League Baseball began officially tracking the RBI statistic in 1920 (he first did it on May 20 against the Minnesota Twins). In addition, Lucroy becomes the first Brewer to collect a pair of seven-RBI games in team history.

=== September ===
- September 5 – For the second consecutive game, the Washington Nationals tie a franchise record with six home runs in a 9–1 rout of the Chicago Cubs. The Nationals become just the third team in major league history to hit at least six home runs in consecutive games, joining the 1996 Los Angeles Dodgers and the 2003 Anaheim Angels. Two of those six homers were hit by 19-year-old rookie Bryce Harper. With it being his second multihomer game of the season, Harper becomes the third player ever with more than one multihomer game in a season as a teenager, joining Mel Ott (1928) and Ken Griffey Jr. (1989). Harper also is the third teenager with at least 17 homers in a season, trailing only Tony Conigliaro (24, 1964) and Mel Ott (18, 1928).
- September 14 – At Yankee Stadium, Derek Jeter of the New York Yankees moves into the top 10 on the all-time hits list, beating out an infield single in the fifth inning of the Yankees' 6–4 loss to the Tampa Bay Rays. The hit gives him 3,284 for his career, passing Willie Mays for 10th place. In the eighth inning of the same game, Alex Rodriguez hits his 647th career home run, which gives him 1,889 career runs scored, passing Lou Gehrig for ninth place on the all-time list.
- September 18:
  - The Brazilian baseball federation announces that Hall of Fame shortstop Barry Larkin will manage the Brazil team during a qualifying round for the 2013 World Baseball Classic. The Brazilian team would go on to win the qualifying round played in Panama City from November 15 to 19.
  - The Reno Aces rout the Pawtucket Red Sox, 10–3, to capture the Triple A Championship title. A. J. Pollock, who triples and doubles with an RBI and two runs scored, earns the Most Valuable Player honors. The result gives the Pacific Coast League teams a 4–3 lead over the International League in the series, which began in Oklahoma City in 2006.
- September 19 – Omar Vizquel of the Toronto Blue Jays collects a single and double in the Jays' 4–2 loss at Yankee Stadium. The double drives in a run and puts Vizquel one hit ahead of Babe Ruth with 2,874, good for 41st place on the all-time list.
- September 20 – The Washington Nationals defeat the visiting Los Angeles Dodgers, 4–1, to secure at least a National League wild card place and bring playoff baseball back to the U.S. capital for the first time in 79 years, when the Washington Senators fell to the New York Giants in the 1933 World Series. This would be the franchise's second postseason berth and its first since the Montreal Expos came within a game of advancing to the 1981 World Series.
- September 21:
  - Melky Cabrera is disqualified from the National League batting champion honor at his own request when Major League Baseball and the Players Association agree to a one-season-only change in the rule governing the individual batting, slugging and on-base percentage champions. Cabrera, the All-Star Game MVP, was suspended on August 15 for violating the Joint Drug Program and was missing the final 45 games of the regular season. Entering the day with a league-leading .346 batting average, he had 501 plate appearances, one short of the required minimum, but would have won the title under section 10.22(a) of the Official Baseball Rules if an extra hitless at-bat were added to his average and he still finished ahead. Cabrera took the initiative in sending a letter to MLB and the PA. "To be plain, I personally have no wish to win an award that would widely be seen as tainted, and I believe that it would be far better for the remaining contenders to compete for that distinction", Cabrera wrote.
  - The Tampa Bay Rays maul the Toronto Blue Jays, 12–1, as their pitching staff sets a new league record for combined strikeouts in a single season when James Shields strikes out J. P. Arencibia leading off the second inning. With 1,267 strikeouts, the combined efforts of the starting pitchers and the bullpen surpasses the previous record of 1,266, held by the 2011 New York Yankees. The Rays have 11 games remaining to extend the mark. The major league record is 1,404, which was set by the 2003 Chicago Cubs.
- September 22 – On the same day, the Cincinnati Reds and the San Francisco Giants clinch their respective divisions. The Reds win their second NL Central Division title in three years with a 6–0 win over the Los Angeles Dodgers at a celebratory Great American Ball Park. Mat Latos pitches eight innings of shutout ball, while Jay Bruce and Brandon Phillips each hit a home run. A few hours later, Madison Bumgarner pitches San Francisco to its second NL West Division title in three years. Newcomer Marco Scutaro has three hits and three RBI in the Giants' 8–4 win over the San Diego Padres in front of their fans at AT&T Park, just as they did on the season's final day in 2010 on the way to an improbable World Series championship.
- September 23 – Spain defeats Israel, 9–7, in Jupiter, Florida to qualify for the 2013 World Baseball Classic.
- September 24 – Canada defeats Germany, 11–1, in Regensburg, Germany to qualify for the 2013 World Baseball Classic.
- September 25 – The Los Angeles Angels tie a major league record by striking out 20 opposing batters in a 9-inning game in a victory over the Seattle Mariners. The Angels are the first to do so using multiple pitchers.
- September 26 – The Oakland A's break the American League record set by the 2007 Tampa Bay Devil Rays for striking out the most times in a season. Craig Kimbrel strikes out four batters in one inning.
- September 27:
  - The Houston Astros name Bo Porter their new manager for the upcoming season. Porter, who is, at the time, the Washington Nationals third base coach, replaces Brad Mills, who was dismissed the prior month. Porter would remain with the postseason-bound Nationals for the remainder of their season. In other managerial movements, Manny Acta is dismissed as manager of the Cleveland Indians after the team collapsed from contention. Bench coach Sandy Alomar Jr., a former Indians catcher and fanatic-favorite, would replace Acta for the last six games of the season.
  - Doug Fister of the Detroit Tigers strikes out an American League-record nine consecutive batters in a 5–4 win against the Kansas City Royals. The AL record of eight had been accomplished by Nolan Ryan (twice), Ron Davis, Roger Clemens, and Blake Stein. Tom Seaver of the New York Mets holds the Major League record, ten consecutive, which was set against the San Diego Padres on April 22, 1970.
  - R. A. Dickey of the New York Mets earns his 20th victory, 6–5, over the Pittsburgh Pirates. In beating the Pirates, Dickey becomes the ninth 20-game winner in team history, and the Mets' sixth different pitcher to achieve the feat, joining Tom Seaver (1969, 1971–72, 1975), Jerry Koosman (1976), Dwight Gooden (1985), David Cone (1988), and Frank Viola (1990).
- September 28 – Homer Bailey of the Cincinnati Reds no-hits the Pittsburgh Pirates 1–0 at PNC Park. He strikes out 10 batters in pitching the seventh no-hitter of this season, which ties 1990 and 1991 for most no-hitters in one modern-day season. The no-hitter is the first by a Red since Tom Browning's perfect game in 1988, and the first against the Pirates since St. Louis' Bob Gibson in 1971. The Pirates' loss is also their 81st of the season and assures them of their 20th consecutive non-winning season, extending their own major North American professional sports record.

=== October ===
- October 1:
  - The Atlanta Braves lose to the Pittsburgh Pirates 2–1 at PNC Park. As a result, the Washington Nationals clinch the NL East championship. The Braves, meanwhile, assure themselves of the first NL Wild Card berth.
  - The Detroit Tigers defeat the Kansas City Royals 6–3 at Kaufmann Stadium to win the AL Central.
- October 2 – The San Francisco Giants defeat the Los Angeles Dodgers 4–3 at Dodger Stadium. The Giants' victory eliminates the Dodgers from postseason contention and clinches the second NL Wild Card berth for the St. Louis Cardinals.
- October 3:
  - On the last day of the regular season, Oakland Athletics defeat the Texas Rangers 12–5 at O.co Coliseum to win the AL West championship. The A's complete a 3-game sweep of the Rangers, who had entered the series 2 games ahead in first place. The A's win the division despite being 13 games out of first place at one point in the season, and despite being 5 games out with 9 games to play. With the conclusion of the game and the regular season, the A's claim sole possession of first place for the first time all season. The Rangers were in first place from April 9 to October 2; earn one of two AL Wild Card berths.
  - The Baltimore Orioles lose to the Tampa Bay Rays 4–1 at Tropicana Field. As a result, the New York Yankees win the AL East division title. The result also ensures that the Orioles qualify as the second AL Wild Card, with the Texas Rangers clinching the first Wild Card berth. Evan Longoria hits three home runs in the Rays' victory; he becomes the third player to hit three home runs on the final day of a regular season, joining Gus Zernial in 1950 and Dick Allen in 1968.
  - Miguel Cabrera of the Detroit Tigers finishes the season winning the American League Triple Crown, leading the league with 44 home runs, 139 runs batted in, and a .330 batting average. Cabrera becomes the first Triple Crown winner since Carl Yastrzemski in 1967, and the first outright winner (Yastrzemski had finished tied with Harmon Killebrew in home runs) since Frank Robinson in 1966.
  - The Houston Astros play their final regular season game as a National League team, at Chicago's Wrigley Field. The Astros lose to the Cubs 5–4.
- October 5:
  - The St. Louis Cardinals defeat the Atlanta Braves 6–3 at Turner Field to win the first NL Wild Card game. The Braves play the final innings of the game under protest following a controversial infield fly rule ruling in the eighth inning. The protest is subsequently denied.
  - The Baltimore Orioles defeat the Texas Rangers 5–1 at Rangers Ballpark to win the first AL Wild Card game.
- October 11:
  - The San Francisco Giants defeat the Cincinnati Reds 6–4 at Great American Ball Park to win the NLDS 3 games to 2. The Giants become the first NL team in the wild card era to win a five-game series after losing the first two games, and the first team overall to do so by winning three consecutive games on the road.
  - The Detroit Tigers defeat the Oakland Athletics 6–0 at O.co Coliseum to win the ALDS 3 games to 2. Justin Verlander of the Tigers pitches a complete-game shutout to prevent the A's from completing a comeback from an 0–2 series deficit that included a come-from-behind 3-run ninth-inning rally in Game 4.
- October 12:
  - The New York Yankees defeat the Baltimore Orioles 3–1 at Yankee Stadium to win the ALDS 3 games to 2.
  - The St. Louis Cardinals defeat the Washington Nationals 9–7 at Nationals Park to win the NLDS 3 games to 2. The Cardinals come back from a six-run deficit, including a two-run deficit with two outs and two strikes in the top of the ninth, to rally past the Nationals and win Game 5 and the series.
- October 18 – At Comerica Park, the Detroit Tigers defeat the New York Yankees 8–1 to complete a four-game sweep of the ALCS. The Yankees had last been swept in a playoff series by the Kansas City Royals in the 1980 American League Championship Series, and in a best-of-seven series by the Cincinnati Reds in the 1976 World Series. This is also the second Series in which the Yankees never had a lead in any game, the first having been in the 1963 World Series, which the Los Angeles Dodgers swept in four games. The Tigers become the first team to win three consecutive postseason Series against the Yankees, having also defeated them in the 2006 and 2011 American League Division Series.
- October 22 – The San Francisco Giants defeat the St. Louis Cardinals 9–0 at AT&T Park in Game 7 of the NLCS to win the National League pennant. The result also eliminates the Cardinals from defending their 2011 World Series title, the twelfth consecutive year a team has failed to defend its World Championship. The Giants outscore the Cardinals 20–1 over the final three games in coming back from a 3–1 series deficit, becoming the first team since the 1985 Kansas City Royals to win six consecutive games when facing elimination in the same postseason. Marco Scutaro ties an LCS record with 14 base hits in the series, and is named NLCS MVP.
- October 24 – Pablo Sandoval of the San Francisco Giants becomes the fourth player in major league history to hit three home runs in a World Series game, hitting two of them off Justin Verlander of the Detroit Tigers. The Giants go on to defeat the Tigers 8–3 at AT&T Park in Game 1.
- October 27 – Behind Ryan Vogelsong, Tim Lincecum, and Sergio Romo, the San Francisco Giants shut out the Detroit Tigers 2–0 in Game 3 of the World Series at Comerica Park. Having shut out the Tigers in Game 2 as well, the Giants become the first team since the Baltimore Orioles in 1966 to pitch consecutive shutouts in the World Series. They are also the first National League team to do so since the Cincinnati Reds in the 1919 World Series. With four shutouts within a span of six games, starting with Game 5 of the NLCS, the Giants tie a Major League record for most shutouts in one postseason.
- October 28 – The San Francisco Giants complete a four-game sweep of the Detroit Tigers in the 2012 World Series by winning 4–3 in 10 innings at Comerica Park. Marco Scutaro singles home Ryan Theriot in the top of the 10th inning to break a 3–3 tie and Sergio Romo strikes out Miguel Cabrera for the third out in the bottom of the inning to end it. The result marks the first sweep by a National League team since the Cincinnati Reds did so in 1990 and the first by an NL team not the Reds since the Los Angeles Dodgers in 1963. Pablo Sandoval is named World Series MVP.

=== November ===
- November 1:
  - The Miami Marlins hire Mike Redmond as manager. He replaces Ozzie Guillén, who was dismissed after a single 69–93 season.
  - The National Baseball Hall of Fame and Museum announces 10 candidates to be considered by the Pre-Integration Era Committee, a subcommittee of the Veterans Committee, for possible induction in the Hall of Fame class of 2013. Results are to be announced during the 2012 winter meetings.
- November 8 – Walt Weiss is hired as manager of the Colorado Rockies.
- November 18 – Chinese Taipei defeats New Zealand 9–0 in New Taipei City, Taiwan to qualify for the 2013 World Baseball Classic.
- November 19:
  - Brazil defeats Panama 1–0 in Panama City, Panama to qualify for the 2013 World Baseball Classic
  - In a 12-player mega deal, the Miami Marlins trade All-Star shortstop José Reyes, pitchers Mark Buehrle and Josh Johnson, catcher John Buck and outfielder Emilio Bonifacio to the Toronto Blue Jays, in exchange for infielders Yunel Escobar and Adeiny Hechavarria, pitcher Henderson Álvarez, catcher Jeff Mathis, and minor leaguers Anthony DeSclafani (P), Justin Nicolino (P) and Jake Marisnick (OF).
- November 28 – The Hall of Fame announces the players' ballot from which Baseball Writers' Association of America members will vote on candidates for the induction class of 2013. It consists of 13 returning and 24 new candidates, with results to be announced on January 9, 2013.

=== December ===
- December 3 – The National Baseball Hall of Fame and Museum announces the results of voting by the Pre-Integration Era Committee. After considering 10 candidates whose greatest contributions to the sport came before 1947, the panel elects executive Jacob Ruppert, umpire Hank O'Day, and player Deacon White. These individuals were formally inducted on July 28, 2013, at the Hall in Cooperstown, New York.
- December 4 – The Hall of Fame announces Paul Hagen, a writer for MLB.com who had been with the Philadelphia Daily News from 1987 to 2012, as the 2013 recipient of the J. G. Taylor Spink Award from the Baseball Writers' Association of America. Hagen would formally receive the honor at the Hall of Fame Awards Presentation on July 27, the day before the Hall's annual induction ceremony.
- December 5 – The Hall of Fame announces Tom Cheek, who was the lead radio play-by-play announcer for the Toronto Blue Jays from the team's establishment in 1977 until his retirement in 2004, as the 2013 recipient of its Ford C. Frick Award for excellence in baseball broadcasting. Cheek, who died in 2005, would formally receive the honor at the Hall of Fame Awards Presentation.
- December 26 – In a six-player trade, the Boston Red Sox acquire All-Star closer Joel Hanrahan and SS/2B Brock Holt from the Pittsburgh Pirates in exchange for reliever Mark Melancon, 1B/OF Jerry Sands, IF Iván DeJesús Jr., and right-hander Stolmy Pimentel.
- December 27 – Hideki Matsui retires from professional baseball after 20 years. The former Yomiuri Giants and New York Yankees star hit 507 home runs during his professional career, 332 with Nippon Professional Baseball and 175 with the Yankees, Los Angeles Angels of Anaheim, Oakland Athletics and Tampa Bay Rays. Matsui won three MVP awards in NPB's Central League and was the Most Valuable Player in the 2009 World Series.

== Deaths ==
=== January ===
- January 2 – Howie Koplitz, 73, pitcher for the Tigers and Senators in parts of five seasons spanning 1961–1966, who also was named Southern Association MVP and TSN Minor League Player of the Year in 1961.
- January 8 – Glenn Cox, 80, pitcher for the Kansas City Athletics from 1955 to 1958.
- January 17 – Marty Springstead, 74, former American League umpire from 1966 to 1985, who at the age of 36 in 1973 became the youngest umpire crew chief in World Series history, and also worked in three Series, three All-Star Games and five AL championship series.
- January 21 – Cliff Chambers, 90, pitcher for the Cubs, Pirates and Cardinals from 1948 to 1953.
- January 21 – Troy Herriage, 81, pitcher for the 1956 Kansas City Athletics.
- January 22 – Andy Musser, 74, play-by-play broadcaster for the Philadelphia Phillies during 26 seasons from 1976 through 2001.
- January 26 – Bud Byerly, 91, pitcher who played for the Cardinals, Reds, Senators, Red Sox and Giants for parts of 11 seasons spanning 1943–1960.
- January 31 – Rick Behenna, 51, pitcher for the Atlanta Braves and Cleveland Indians in parts of three seasons from 1983 through 1985.

=== February ===
- February 1 – Herb Adams, 83, backup outfielder who played from 1948 to 1950 with the Chicago White Sox.
- February 7 – Danny Clyburn, 37, outfielder who played parts of three seasons with the Baltimore Orioles and Tampa Bay Devil Rays in the late 1990s.
- February 11 – Gene Crumling, 89, catcher for the 1945 St. Louis Cardinals, one of many ballplayers who only appeared in the majors during World War II.
- February 16 – Gary Carter, 57, Hall of Fame catcher, principally with the Montreal Expos and New York Mets, whose two-out, tenth-inning single for the Mets in Game 6 of the 1986 World Series started one of the most improbable rallies in postseason history.
- February 17 – Howie Nunn, 76, relief pitcher for the St. Louis Cardinals and Cincinnati Reds in parts of three seasons from 1959 to 1962.
- February 19 – Dick Smith, 72, outfielder and first baseman who played from 1963 through 1965 for the New York Mets and Los Angeles Dodgers.
- February 24 – Agnes Allen, 81, All-American Girls Professional Baseball League pitcher.
- February 24 – Terry Mathews, 47, relief pitcher for the Florida Marlins, Baltimore Orioles, Texas Rangers and Kansas City Royals in part of eight seasons spanning 1991–1999.
- February 24 – Jay Ward, 73, infielder for the Minnesota Twins and Cincinnati Reds who got into 27 games over three seasons between 1963 and 1970; later a successful minor-league manager.
- February 25 – Dave Cheadle, 60, relief pitcher for the 1973 Atlanta Braves.

=== March ===
- March 3 – Lloyd Hittle, 88, pitcher for the Washington Senators from 1949 to 1950.
- March 3 – Jim Obradovich, 62, first baseman who played briefly for the Houston Astros in 1978.
- March 4 – Don Mincher, 73, two-time All-Star first baseman and member of the 1972 Oakland Athletics World Series champions, who also has the distinction of being the only major leaguer to play with the Washington Senators franchise that became the Minnesota Twins, and then play with a second incarnation of the Senators which became the Texas Rangers.
- March 6 – Helen Walulik, 82, All-American Girls Professional Baseball League pitcher and outfield/infield utility.
- March 9 – Harry Wendelstedt, 73, National League umpire who worked five World Series and four All-Star games during his 33-year career from 1966 through 1998; father of umpire Hunter Wendelstedt.
- March 11 – Hub Andrews, 89, relief pitcher for the New York Giants from 1947 to 1948.
- March 15 – Dave Philley, 91, outfielder and pinch-hitting specialist for eight different teams between 1941 and 1962, who still holds the major league records for most consecutive pinch-hits in a season (nine, 1958) and for most at-bats in an 18-inning double-header (13, 1951); also holds American League record for the most pinch-hits in a season (24, 1961).
- March 18 – Furman Bisher, 93, Atlanta sportswriter who authored several books, including co-writing an autobiography of Hank Aaron.
- March 20 – Mel Parnell, 89, two-time All-Star pitcher and the winningest left-hander in Boston Red Sox history with 123 wins from 1947 to 1956, who also posted a 25–7 record in 1949 and hurled a no-hitter in 1956.
- March 24 – Dennis Bennett, 72, pitcher for the Phillies, Red Sox, Mets and Angels between 1962 and 1968.
- March 29 – Ray Narleski, 83, two-time All-Star reliever with the Cleveland Indians, and part of a brilliant bullpen that featured Don Mossi and Hal Newhouser, during the historic 1954 season.
- March 30 – Janet Anderson, 90, Canadian pitcher for the Kenosha Comets of the All-American Girls Professional Baseball League.
- March 31 – Jerry Lynch, 82, Pirates and Reds outfielder, whose 116 career pinch-hits is the 10th-most in Major League Baseball history.

=== April ===
- April 2 – Allie Clark, 88, outfielder who played from 1947 through 1953 for the New York Yankees, Cleveland Indians, Philadelphia Athletics and Chicago White Sox.
- April 8 – Al Veigel, 95, pitcher for the 1939 Boston Bees.
- April 10 – Andy Replogle, 58, pitcher for the Milwaukee Brewers from 1978 to 1979.
- April 15 – Ron Plaza, 75, minor league infielder, instructor and manager who coached in the majors for the 1969 Seattle Pilots, 1979–1983 Cincinnati Reds and 1986 Oakland Athletics.
- April 17 – Stan Johnson, 75, backup outfielder who played for the Chicago White Sox and Kansas City Athletics between 1960 and 1961.
- April 18 – John O'Neil, 92, backup shortstop for the 1946 Philadelphia Phillies, who spent more than 45 years spanning 1939–1986 as player, player/manager, manager, general manager and scout.
- April 24 – Fred Bradley, 91, pitcher for the Chicago White Sox from 1948 to 1949.
- April 26 – Bill Skowron, 81, eight-time AL All-Star first baseman who was part of five World Series champion teams (New York Yankees, 1956, 1958, 1961–1962) and Los Angeles Dodgers (1963); also played for Washington Senators, Chicago White Sox and California Angels.
- April 29 – Daisy Junor, 92, Canadian outfielder who played from 1946 through 1949 in the All-American Girls Professional Baseball League.

=== May ===
- May 5 – Don Leshnock, 65, relief pitcher for the 1972 Detroit Tigers.
- May 8 – Jerry McMorris, 71, principal owner of the Colorado Rockies from 1992 through 2005.
- May 9 – Carl Beane, 59, public address announcer for the Boston Red Sox at Fenway Park since the 2003 season.
- May 11 – Frank Wills, 53, pitcher for the Royals, Mariners, Indians and Blue Jays from 1983 through 1991, who won the AL East pennant-winning game for Toronto in the 1989 season.
- May 16 – Kevin Hickey, 56, pitcher for the White Sox and Orioles in part of six seasons spanning 1981–1991.
- May 16 – Thad Tillotson, 71, relief pitcher for the New York Yankees from 1967 to 1968, who also pitched for the Nankai Hawks in Japan during the 1971 season.
- May 28 – Harry Parker, 64, a spot starting pitcher who was an integral contributor for the 1973 New York Mets National League champions.

=== June ===
- June 4 – Pedro Borbón, 65, Dominican reliever for the Cincinnati Reds during 10 seasons, and a key member on the bullpen of the Big Red Machine that won back-to-back World Series titles in 1975 and 1976.
- June 5 – Hal Keller, 84, backup catcher for the Washington Senators between 1949 and 1952, and later a front office executive for the Texas Rangers and Seattle Mariners in a 25-year career from 1961 through 1985; brother of Charlie Keller.
- June 9 – Hawk Taylor, 73, backup catcher for the Milwaukee Braves, New York Mets, California Angels and Kansas City Royals in parts of 11 seasons spanning 1959–1970.
- June 10 – Warner Fusselle, 68, broadcaster particularly remembered for his groundbreaking contribution to This Week in Baseball.
- June 11 – Dave Boswell, 67, pitcher who posted a 68–56 record and a 3.52 ERA for the Twins, Tigers and Orioles from 1964 through 1971, while leading the American League with a .706 winning percentage in 1966.
- June 14 – Al Brancato, 93, shortstop for the Philadelphia Athletics in part of four seasons spanning 1939–1945.
- June 17 – Patricia Brown, 81, pitcher for the Chicago Colleens and the Battle Creek Belles of the All-American Girls Professional Baseball League.
- June 24 – Darrel Akerfelds, 50, pitcher for the Athletics, Indians, Rangers and Phillies from 1986 through 1991, and later a bullpen coach for the San Diego Padres from 2001 to 2011.
- June 28 – Doris Sams, 85, All-American Girls Professional Baseball League outfielder/pitcher; a five-time All-Star and two-time Player of the Year Award winner, who won a batting crown and one home run title, while throwing a perfect game and one no-hitter in a career that spanned from 1946 through 1953.

=== July ===
- July 1 – Mike Hershberger, 72, right fielder for Chicago White Sox, Kansas City/Oakland Athletics, and Milwaukee Brewers (1961–1971), who led all American League outfielders in assists both in 1965 and 1967.
- July 2 – Ed Stroud, 72, outfielder for the Chicago White Sox and the Washington Senators from 1966 to 1971.
- July 7 – Doris Neal, 83, All-American Girls Professional Baseball League infielder/outfielder from 1948 to 1949.
- July 8 – Chick King, 81, backup outfielder for the Tigers, Cubs and Cardinals in five seasons between 1954 and 1959.
- July 11 – Art Ceccarelli, 82, pitcher for the Kansas City A's, Cubs and Orioles in part of five seasons spanning 1955–60.
- July 18 – Robert W. Creamer, 90, one of the original Sports Illustrated writers, who also wrote biographies of Babe Ruth and Casey Stengel.
- July 21 – Marie Kruckel, 88, outfielder and pitcher in the All-American Girls Professional Baseball League.
- July 22 – Ed Stevens, 87, first baseman who played from 1945 through 1950 for the Brooklyn Dodgers and Pittsburgh Pirates, and also gained induction into the International League Hall of Fame in 2009.
- July 23 – Louise Nippert, 100, owner of the Cincinnati Reds during the Big Red Machine era.
- July 24 – Nancy Mudge Cato, 82, All-Star infielder who played for five different teams of the All-American Girls Professional Baseball League.

=== August ===
- August 1 – Don Erickson, 80, relief pitcher for the 1958 Philadelphia Phillies.
- August 13 – Dan Daniels, 90, Washington, D.C., sportscaster who was the radio/TV voice of the expansion Senators from the team's founding in 1961 through 1968.
- August 13 – Johnny Pesky, 92, a 61-year member of the Boston Red Sox spanning 1940–2012, while serving them as a player, manager, coach, broadcaster, and well-esteemed team ambassador; also played for Detroit Tigers and Washington Senators, and coached for Pittsburgh Pirates.
- August 22 – Bob Myrick, 59, relief pitcher who played from 1976 through 1978 for the New York Mets.
- August 29 – Les Moss, 87, catcher who played from 1946 through 1958 for the St. Louis Browns, Boston Red Sox, Baltimore Orioles and Chicago White Sox; manager of Detroit Tigers for first 53 games of 1979 season until replaced by Sparky Anderson; coach for White Sox, Chicago Cubs and Houston Astros for 13 years between 1967 and 1989; also managed in the minor leagues for 11 seasons.
- August 31 – Nat Peeples, 86, infielder who, after playing for Memphis, Indianapolis and the Kansas City Monarchs of the Negro American League in the late 1940s, joined "Organized" minor league baseball in 1951; there he became the first and only Black player to appear in the segregated, Double-A Southern Association in 1954 for two games and four at bats for the Atlanta Crackers, before being assigned to previously integrated leagues; he retired from baseball in 1960 at age 34, and the SA folded in 1961, still a bastion of segregation.

=== September ===
- September 8 – Bob Hale, 78, first baseman who played from 1955 through 1961 with the Baltimore Orioles, Cleveland Indians and New York Yankees.
- September 10 – Tom Saffell, 91, backup outfielder for the Pittsburgh Pirates and Kansas City Athletics in parts of four seasons spanning 1949–1955, who later served as President of the Gulf Coast League from 1979 to 2009.
- September 11 – Bruce Von Hoff, 68, relief pitcher for the Houston Astros in the 1965 and 1967 seasons.
- September 13 – Bob DiPietro, 85, backup outfielder for the 1951 Boston Red Sox.
- September 13 – Jack Pierce, 64, first baseman for the Atlanta Braves and Detroit Tigers in parts of three seasons spanning 1973–75, who also played in Japan with the 1977 Nankai Hawks.
- September 17 – Pauline Dennert, 86, All-American Girls Professional Baseball League player.
- September 18 – Jack Kralick, 77, All-Star pitcher and one of the original Minnesota Twins, who posted a 67–65 record and a 3.56 ERA in eight seasons which included stints with the Washington Senators and the Cleveland Indians, while hurling a no-hitter against the Kansas City Athletics in 1962.
- September 21 – Tom Umphlett, 82, outfielder for the Boston Red Sox and Washington Senators from 1953 through 1955, and later a minor league manager from 1967 to 1970.
- September 23 – Roberto Muñoz Rodríguez, 70, Venezuelan pitcher who played for the Kansas City/Oakland Athletics, San Diego Padres and Chicago Cubs between the 1967 and 1970 seasons.
- September 25 – Audrey Deemer, 81, All-American Girls Professional Baseball League player.

=== October ===
- October 6 – Irene DeLaby, 90, All-American Girls Professional Baseball League player.
- October 11 – Champ Summers, 66, outfielder who played 10 seasons in the majors for six different teams, mainly for the Detroit Tigers from 1979 to 1981, and also a hitting coach for the New York Yankees.
- October 12 – Jim Kremmel, 63, relief pitcher who played from 1973 to 1974 for the Texas Rangers and Chicago Cubs.
- October 16 – Eddie Yost, 86, All-Star third baseman who led the American League in walks six times during an 18-year career, 14 of them with the Washington Senators spanning 1944–1958; spent 23 years as a coach for four MLB teams (1962–1984).
- October 20 – Dave May, 68, All-Star outfielder who spent 12 seasons in the majors with the Baltimore Orioles, Milwaukee Brewers, Atlanta Braves, Texas Rangers and Pittsburgh Pirates from 1967 to 1978, and also the player that was sent by Milwaukee to Atlanta in exchange for Hank Aaron.
- October 25 – Les Mueller, 93, starting pitcher for the Detroit Tigers 1945 World Series championship team, who hurled 192/3 innings in a regular game against the Philadelphia Athletics, which remains the longest outing since 1929 when another Tigers pitcher, George Uhle, logged 20 innings against the Chicago White Sox.

=== November ===
- November 1 – Pascual Pérez, 55, Dominican All-Star pitcher who compiled a lifetime record of 67–68 and a 3.44 ERA with the Braves, Pirates, Expos and Yankees over an 11-season span from 1980 to 1991.
- November 2 – Joe Ginsberg, 86, catcher for the original 1962 New York Mets, who also had stops with the Indians, Kansas City A's, Orioles, White Sox and Red Sox during a 13-year career.
- November 9 – Harold Gould, 88, Minor league pitcher who had a seven-season career between 1942 and 1949, most prominently for the Negro league Philadelphia Stars in 1946 and 1948.
- November 9 – Lee MacPhail, 95, American League president from 1974 to 1983, and longtime team executive (New York Yankees, Baltimore Orioles); oldest living Hall of Fame member, and part of the only father-son duo in the Hall (with his father, Larry MacPhail, who introduced night games to the majors in 1935); father of longtime executive Andy MacPhail.
- November 14 – Gail Harris, 81, first baseman for the New York Giants and Detroit Tigers from 1955 to 1960, who holds the distinction of being the last player to hit a home run for the Giants before they moved to San Francisco.
- November 17 – Freddy Schmidt, 96, pitcher who played 15 seasons of professional ball, four of them for the St. Louis Cardinals, Philadelphia Phillies and Chicago Cubs spanning 1944–47, also a member of the World Champion Cardinals in 1946 and the Phillies' oldest alumnus.
- November 22 – Ken Rowe, 78, who pitched professionally for 15 seasons, appearing in the majors from 1963 through 1965 with the Los Angeles Dodgers and the Baltimore Orioles, and later working during 21 years in the Cleveland Indians organization at virtually every level of the Indians' minor-league system.
- November 23 – Chuck Diering, 89, outfielder in part of nine seasons from 1947 to 1956 for the St. Louis Cardinals, New York Giants and Baltimore Orioles, who was named Orioles Most Valuable Player in their first year in Baltimore after the St. Louis Browns moved there.
- November 23 – Hal Trosky Jr., 76, who pitched briefly for the Chicago White Sox during the 1958 season; son and namesake of the slugging first baseman of the 1930s.
- November 24 – Jimmy Stewart, 73, utility man who played every position except pitcher in parts of ten seasons spanning 1963–73, which included stints with the Cubs, Reds, Astros and White Sox.
- November 27 – Marvin Miller, 95, executive director of the MLB Players Association from 1966 to 1982, who turned the union into one of the most powerful in the country, after negotiating the first collective bargaining agreement in sports history in 1968.
- November 30 – Rogelio Álvarez, 74, Cuban-born American first baseman for the Cincinnati Reds in parts of the 1960 and 1962 seasons.

=== December ===
- December 17 – Frank Pastore, 55, middle reliever who posted a 48–58 record with a 4.29 ERA and six saves in 220 games for the Reds and Twins from 1979 to 1986.
- December 19 – George O'Donnell, 83, pitcher for the 1954 Pittsburgh Pirates.
- December 21 – Boyd Bartley, 92, shortstop for the 1943 Brooklyn Dodgers, then a longtime scout for the franchise,. retiring in 1990.
- December 22 – Ryan Freel, 36, outfielder/infielder who played with five different teams in a span of eight seasons, most prominently for the Cincinnati Reds from 2003 through 2008.
- December 24 – Brad Corbett, 75, who owned the Texas Rangers from 1974 to 1980.
