= Haven, Kansas =

City in Reno County, Kansas

- City
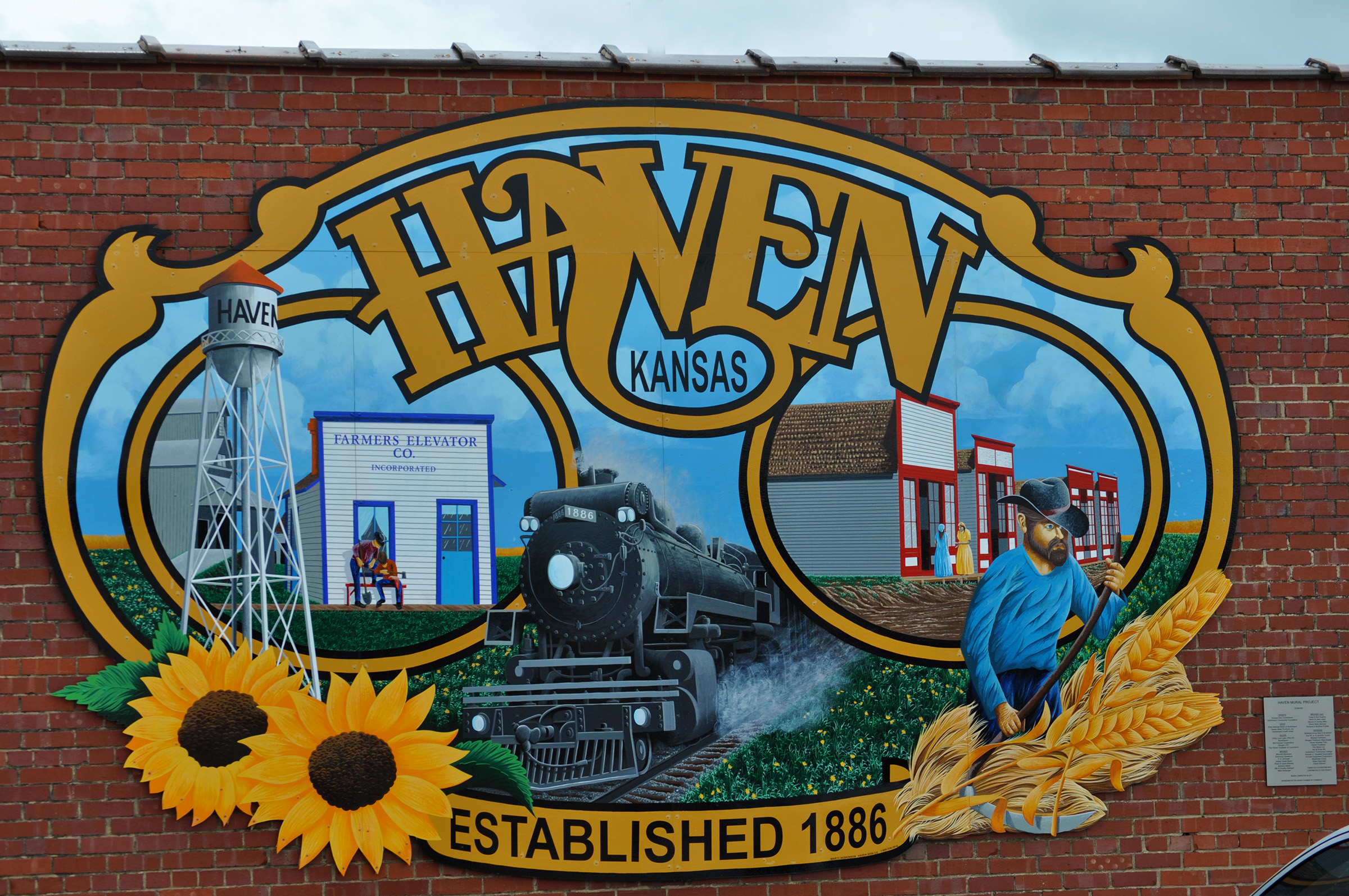
- Haven mural (2015)

- Location within Reno County and Kansas

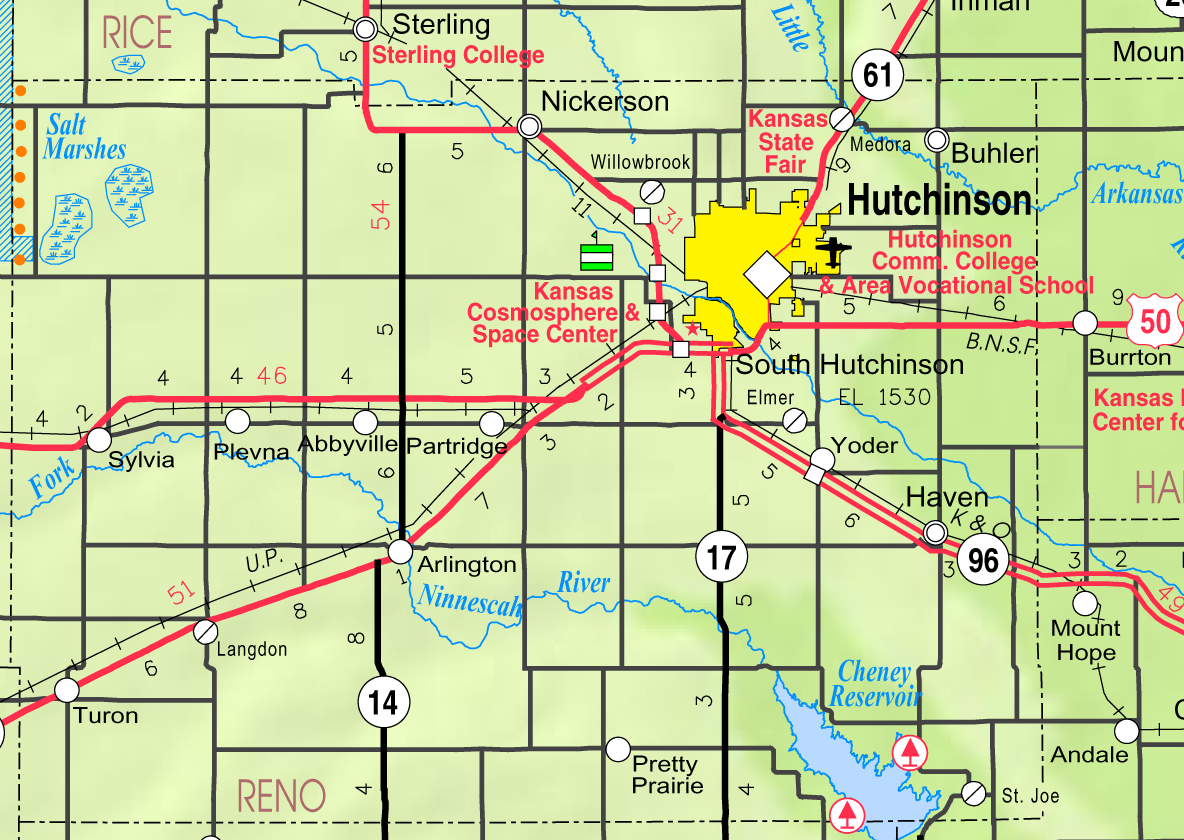
- KDOT map of Reno County (legend)
- Coordinates: 37°54′06″N 97°46′59″W
- Country: United States
- State: Kansas
- County: Reno
- Founded: 1880s
- Platted: 1886
- Incorporated: 1901

Area
  - Total: 0.78 sq mi (2.01 km^{2})
  - Land: 0.78 sq mi (2.01 km^{2})
  - Water: 0 sq mi (0.00 km^{2})
- Elevation: 1,486 ft (453 m)

Population (2020)
  - Total: 1,170
  - Density: 1,510/sq mi (582/km^{2})
- Time zone: UTC-6 (CST)
  - Summer (DST): UTC-5 (CDT)
- ZIP Code: 67543
- Area code: 620
- FIPS code: 20-30725
- GNIS ID: 2394326
- Website: havencityhall.org

Haven is a city in Reno County, Kansas, United States. As of the 2020 census, the population of the city was 1,170.

== History ==
Haven was laid out in 1886, and incorporated as a city in 1901. The first post office in Haven was established in 1873.

The local high school football team was on the winning side of a lopsided football game against another school from across the county in Sylvia. Played in 1927 with a final score of 256–0, the game produced multiple national and state high school records. As of 2016, the state records include: Total points scored, points by both teams, widest margin, widest shutout, most touchdowns (38), and most rushing touchdowns (30). Also, Haven student Elvin McCoy holds state records for both individual points per game with 90 and individual touchdowns scored per game with 13. The introduction of the mercy rule means that many of these records will likely never be broken.

In 2022, the mayor and council unanimously voted to remove "In God We Trust" decals from the city's police vehicles. However, after public outcry, the council voted to put the decals back onto the city's police cars.

== Geography ==
According to the United States Census Bureau, the city has a total area of 0.63 square miles (1.63 km^{2}), all land.

== Area events ==
- Haven Fall Festival, held on the second weekend of October each year.

== Demographics ==
Historical population
| Census | Pop. | Note | %± |
|---|---|---|---|
| 1910 | 528 | | — |
| 1920 | 1,301 | | 146.4% |
| 1930 | 553 | | −57.5% |
| 1940 | 653 | | 18.1% |
| 1950 | 720 | | 10.3% |
| 1960 | 982 | | 36.4% |
| 1970 | 1,146 | | 16.7% |
| 1980 | 1,125 | | −1.8% |
| 1990 | 1,198 | | 6.5% |
| 2000 | 1,175 | | −1.9% |
| 2010 | 1,237 | | 5.3% |
| 2020 | 1,170 | | −5.4% |
U.S. Decennial Census

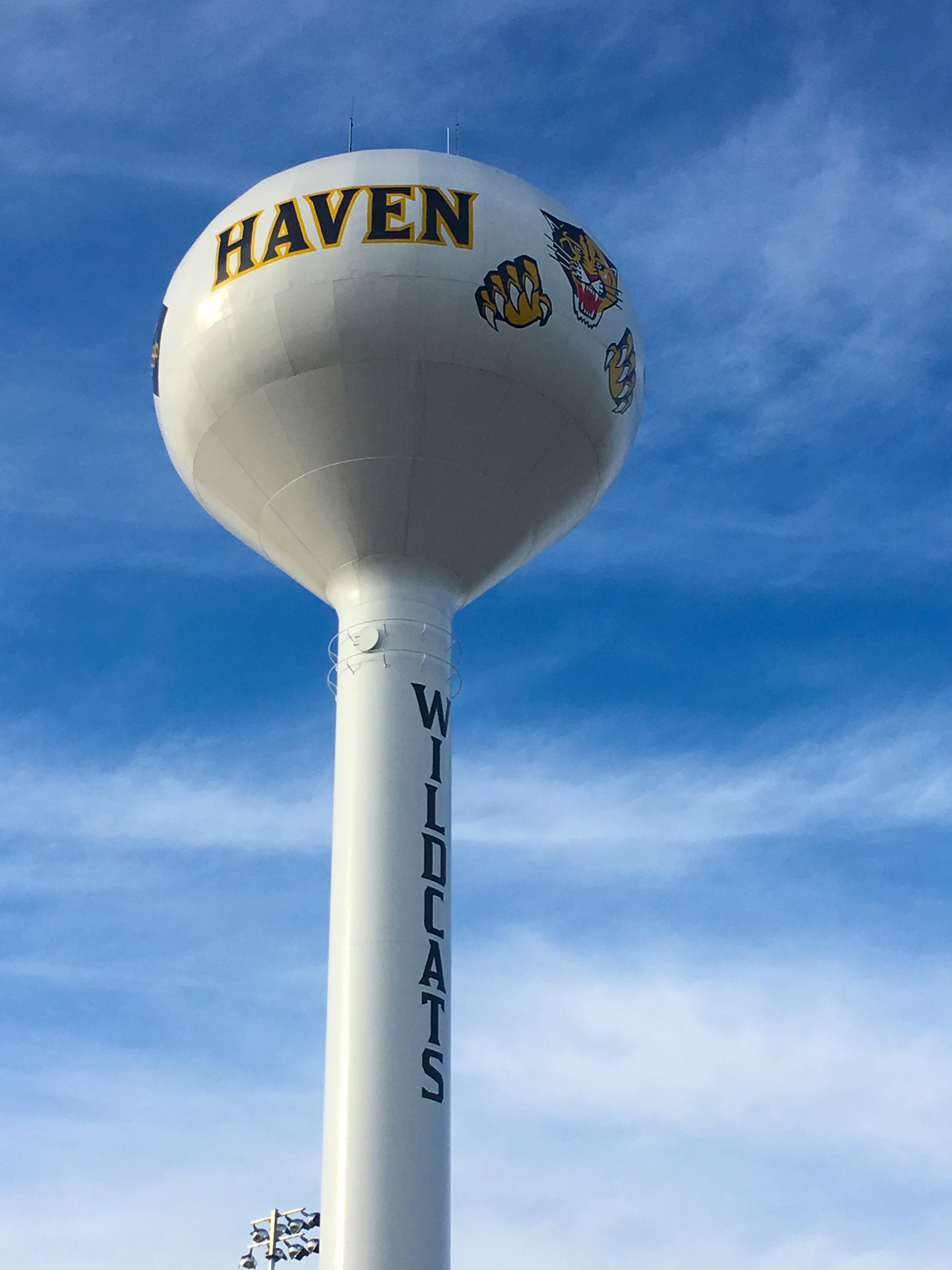
Haven Water Tower (2017)

=== 2020 census ===
The 2020 United States census counted 1,170 people, 475 households, and 315 families in Haven. The population density was 1,505.8 per square mile (581.4/km^{2}). There were 525 housing units at an average density of 675.7 per square mile (260.9/km^{2}). The racial makeup was 89.4% (1,046) white or European American (87.69% non-Hispanic white), 0.94% (11) black or African-American, 0.68% (8) Native American or Alaska Native, 0.17% (2) Asian, 0.0% (0) Pacific Islander or Native Hawaiian, 1.11% (13) from other races, and 7.69% (90) from two or more races. Hispanic or Latino of any race was 4.7% (55) of the population.

Of the 475 households, 31.2% had children under the age of 18; 49.9% were married couples living together; 24.6% had a female householder with no spouse or partner present. 29.1% of households consisted of individuals and 13.7% had someone living alone who was 65 years of age or older. The average household size was 2.5 and the average family size was 3.0. The percent of those with a bachelor's degree or higher was estimated to be 12.6% of the population.

25.6% of the population was under the age of 18, 8.6% from 18 to 24, 24.8% from 25 to 44, 23.6% from 45 to 64, and 17.4% who were 65 years of age or older. The median age was 37.9 years. For every 100 females, there were 103.1 males. For every 100 females ages 18 and older, there were 103.7 males.

The 2016–2020 5-year American Community Survey estimates show that the median household income was $54,777 (with a margin of error of +/- $13,700) and the median family income was $65,474 (+/- $4,746). Males had a median income of $40,968 (+/- $3,085) versus $26,140 (+/- $6,512) for females. The median income for those above 16 years old was $33,438 (+/- $3,566). Approximately, 1.8% of families and 4.0% of the population were below the poverty line, including 1.4% of those under the age of 18 and 10.7% of those ages 65 or over.

=== 2010 census ===
As of the census of 2010, there were 1,237 people, 492 households, and 337 families residing in the city. The population density was 1,963.5 inhabitants per square mile (758.1/km^{2}). There were 526 housing units at an average density of 834.9 per square mile (322.4/km^{2}). The racial makeup of the city was 94.5% White, 0.7% African American, 1.7% Native American, 0.2% Asian, 0.2% from other races, and 2.7% from two or more races. Hispanic or Latino of any race were 2.7% of the population.

There were 492 households, of which 33.1% had children under the age of 18 living with them, 55.5% were married couples living together, 8.5% had a female householder with no husband present, 4.5% had a male householder with no wife present, and 31.5% were non-families. 28.3% of all households were made up of individuals, and 11.6% had someone living alone who was 65 years of age or older. The average household size was 2.51 and the average family size was 3.07.

The median age in the city was 37.1 years. 26.9% of residents were under the age of 18; 8.3% were between the ages of 18 and 24; 22.2% were from 25 to 44; 28.2% were from 45 to 64; and 14.4% were 65 years of age or older. The gender makeup of the city was 47.8% male and 52.2% female.

== Government ==
The Haven government consists of a mayor and five council members. The council meets the first and third Mondays of each month at 7PM.

== Education ==
The community is served by Haven USD 312 public school district.

== Notable people ==
- Andy Dirks, professional baseball player for the Detroit Tigers. He competed in the 2012 World Series.
- Flossie Page, a supercentenarian, lived 112.7 years (1893–2006). At the time she died she was the sixth oldest person in the United States and the oldest person from Kansas to have ever lived.
