= Andy Dirks =

American baseball player (born 1986)

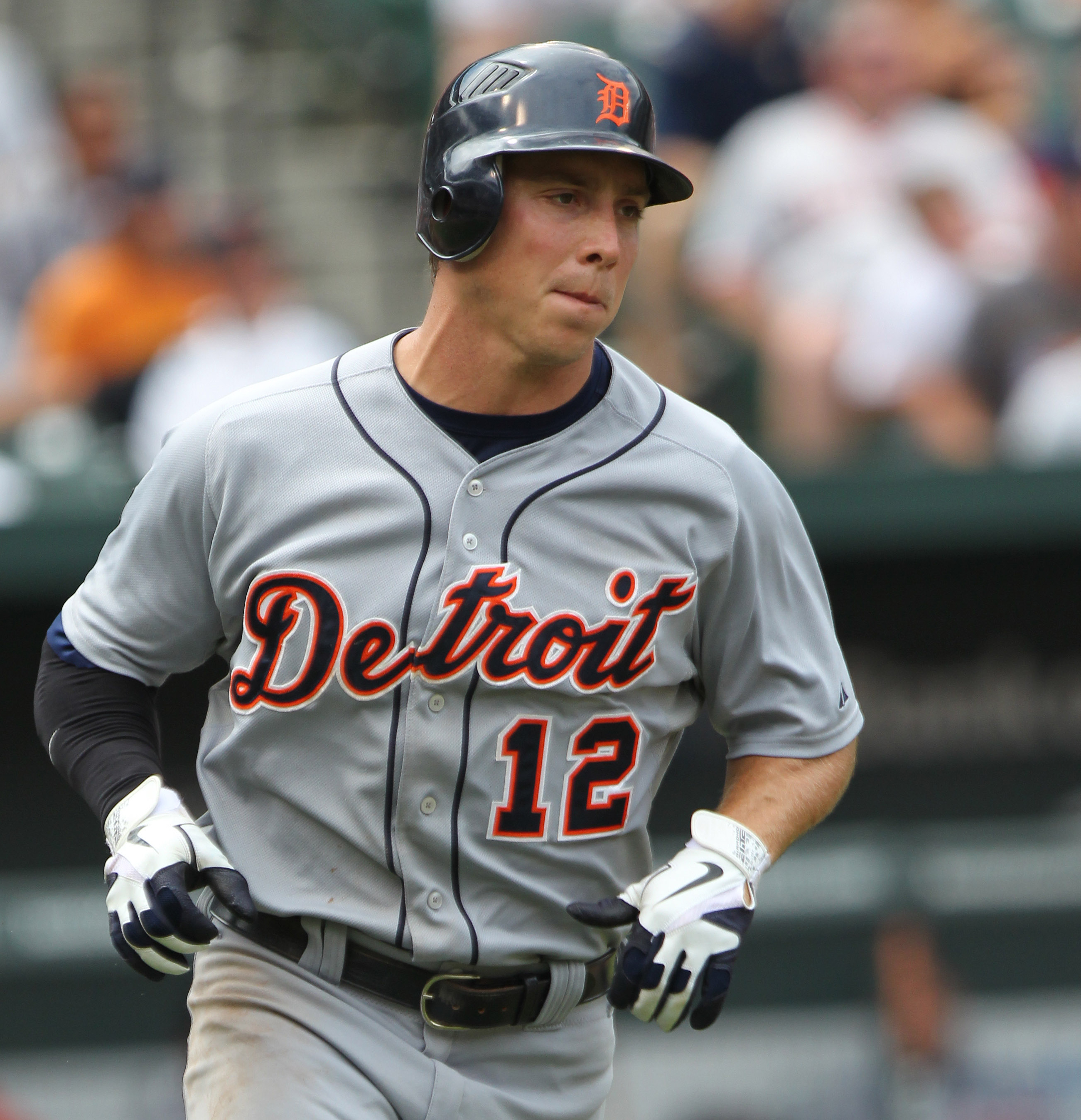
- Dirks with the Detroit Tigers
- Outfielder
- Born: January 24, 1986 (age 40); Hutchinson, Kansas, U.S.
- Batted: Left Threw: Left

MLB debut
- May 16, 2011, for the Detroit Tigers

Last MLB appearance
- September 29, 2013, for the Detroit Tigers

MLB statistics
- Batting average: .276
- Home runs: 24
- Runs batted in: 100
- Stats at Baseball Reference

Teams
- Detroit Tigers (2011–2013)

Andrew Lee Dirks (born January 24, 1986) is an American former professional baseball outfielder. He attended Haven High School in Haven, Kansas, and was drafted by the Detroit Tigers in 2008. Dirks made his Major League Baseball (MLB) debut with the Tigers in 2011. He played all three outfield positions in his three seasons in the major leagues.

== College career ==
Dirks attended Wichita State University, where he played for the Wichita State Shockers baseball team. In 2007, his junior year, he boasted a .320 batting average, 31 runs batted in and 19 steals. He had previously played two seasons at Hutchinson Community College. Dirks was named a Missouri Valley Conference All Star for the 2008 season. He also played for the Fayetteville Swampdogs of the Coastal Plain League in 2005.

== Professional career ==
=== Detroit Tigers ===
==== Minor leagues ====
Dirks was drafted by the Tigers in the eighth round of the 2008 Major League Baseball draft. He joined the West Michigan Whitecaps, but was injured from June 24 to September 3 because of a broken right hand. In August, he had a rehab stint with the Gulf Coast League Tigers, appearing in ten games and posting a .412 batting average. Dirks played in just three games with West Michigan. He got only one hit in ten at-bats, resulting in a batting average of .100.

Dirks began the 2009 season with the Lakeland Flying Tigers. He was recognized as the Florida State League's player of the week for the period of May 4–10, in recognition of his .714 batting average and seven RBI in the league during that stretch. He was promoted to the Erie SeaWolves (Detroit's AA affiliate and a member of the Eastern League) on May 8 and he played with them for the rest of the year. Dirks did not play from August 18–27 because he had suffered a sprained left wrist.

Dirks started 2010 with Erie and his performance there led to him being honored as an Eastern League All–Star. On August 3, he was promoted to the Triple-A Toledo Mud Hens of the International League. A right hamstring strain kept Dirks out of action from August 20–30 and he finished the year having appeared in 98 games with Erie and 22 with Toledo. As a member of the 2010 SeaWolves, he batted .278 with 11 home runs, 46 runs batted in, and 19 stolen bases. Additionally, his 16 outfield assists were the most by any player in the Eastern League. During his shorter stint with the Mud Hens, Dirks put up a .375 batting average, knocked 4 homers and plated 17 runners.

At the end of the 2010 season, Dirks received the Detroit Tigers minor league player of the year award. He appeared in 46 games as a member of Toros del Este, a team in the Dominican Winter League later it was changed for Leones del Escogido one to play in the finals and finally helped to win a championship. He batted .315 for Este and his seven triples were the most in the league.

Dirks began the 2011 season as a member of the Toledo team. His performance there earned him the honor of International League player of the week for the period of April 25 – May 1, as he had a .433 average and drove in five runs during that span. He was also named the top minor league player in the Tigers organization for the month of April, a month in which he hit six home runs, was credited with 24 runs batted in, and had a batting average of .330 over a span of 24 contests.

==== 2011 season ====
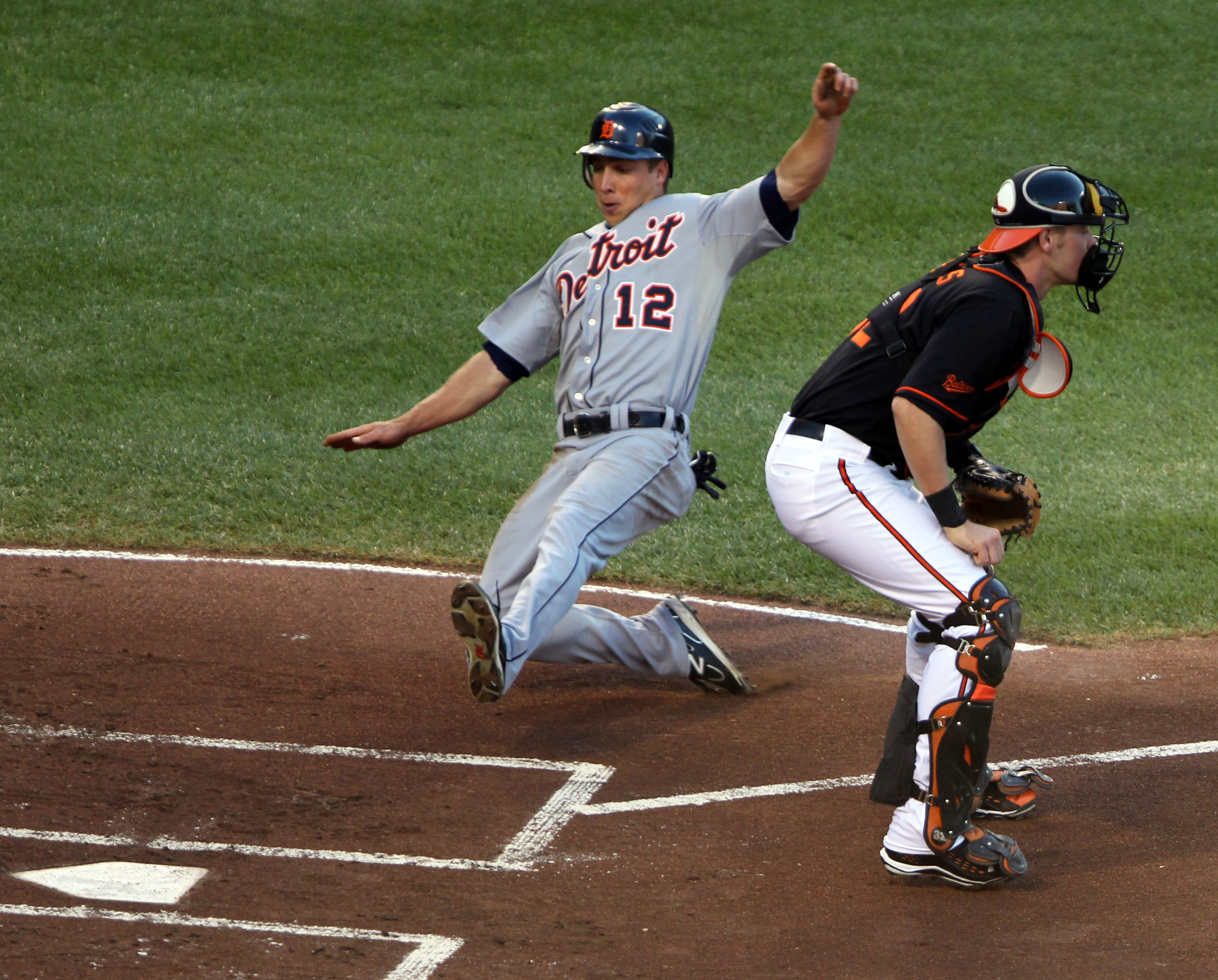
Dirks slides into home plate during a game against the Baltimore Orioles on August 12, 2011.

Dirks was called up to the majors for the first time on May 13, 2011. He made his debut on May 16, 2011, going 1-for-2 with a walk during a game against the Toronto Blue Jays. He hit his first major league home run on May 23, 2011, at Comerica Park versus Tampa Bay Rays pitcher Jeremy Hellickson.

Dirks set a career best with a four–hit performance against the Baltimore Orioles on August 12. The four runs that he drove in on September 4 against the Chicago White Sox was also the most in his young career. He was sent back down to the Mud Hens on August 19. After hitting .308 in a brief stint with Toledo, Dirks was brought back up to the major league roster on September 1. Overall, he batted .325 in 41 games for the Mud Hens and .251 in 78 appearances for the Tigers during the 2011 season. He homered seven times and drove in 28 runners during his time with the Tigers. On the defensive side, Dirks played left field for Detroit in 38 games, right field in 22 games and center field in 16 games.

The Tigers made the playoffs as division champions in 2011 and advanced to the American League Championship Series (ALCS), where they faced the Texas Rangers. While in right field during the eleventh inning of Game 2 of the ALCS, Dirks was unable to catch a fly ball off the bat of Adrián Beltré, as the ball deflected off Dirks's glove. He was not charged with an error on the play, but the Rangers did go on to score the winning runs later in the inning. The Rangers would win the series in six games.

Dirks again played for Este in the Dominican Winter League following the season. In 16 games, he batted .262. As Este did not make the playoffs, Dirks joined the Leones del Escogido for the Dominican Winter League postseason. His performance with Leones, which included two game–winning base hits, helped them to win both the Winter League championship and the Caribbean Series. As a result of his heroics, Dirks become somewhat of a celebrity in the Dominican Republic.

==== 2012 season ====
To begin the 2012 season, Dirks was on the opening roster for the Tigers for the first time in his career. However, in early June, he was put on the disabled list due to right Achilles tendinitis. Dirks did not return to the Major Leagues until he was called back up on August 3. He finished the season with a .322 average, 8 home runs and 35 runs batted in 88 appearances for the Tigers. On defense, Dirks spent the majority of his time (59 games) in left field. He also saw some action in right field, played two innings in center field and was in the starting lineup as the designated hitter ten times. Dirks started in every batting lineup slot except fourth. Though expected to be part of a platoon, he made several starts against left-handed pitchers and hit a respectable .274 against southpaws. He pinch–hit eight times in 2012, going 3 for 7 (.429) with a walk. He posted a .347 batting average at Detroit's home stadium (Comerica Park) and batted .299 on the road. Five of his eight home runs were hit during away games.

==== 2013 season ====
Andy was the primary left fielder for the Tigers in 2013, collecting a career-high 438 at-bats in 131 games. He was frequently rested against left-handed pitching in favor of Matt Tuiasosopo, a right-handed batter. On the season, Andy hit for a .256 average with 9 home runs and 37 RBI. On September 21, the Tigers defeated the Chicago White Sox, 7–6, after trailing 6–0 in the ninth inning. This marked the team's largest ninth inning comeback since the 1947 Tigers accomplished the same feat in a 7–6 win over the Washington Senators. Andy had a key blow in the Tigers' 6-run ninth, a pinch-hit 3-run homer to draw the score to 6–5.

Following the 2013 season, Dirks was named a finalist for the Gold Glove Award for the left field position alongside Alex Gordon and Yoenis Céspedes. (The award went to Gordon.) Among qualified LF (525 defensive innings), Dirks finished seventh in fielding percentage at .991, committing only 2 errors (1 throwing, 1 fielding). Additionally, he was fourth in putouts (211) and sixth in outfield assists (7). Sabermetric statistics from Fangraphs show that Dirks was second in ultimate zone rating (9.4). Dirks was named the fifth best left fielder in the majors by The Fielding Bible based on voting by a ten-member expert panel.

==== 2014 season ====
Expected to be the Tigers primary left fielder in 2014, it was announced early in spring training that Andy had to undergo surgery to repair a lower back issue. On July 8, 2014, the Tigers announced that Dirks would begin a rehabilitation assignment with the high Class A Lakeland Flying Tigers. After a week of game action, it was announced that the Tigers recalled Dirks from his rehab assignment due to lower back muscular inflammation from increased activity, and would keep him on the disabled list. Dirks went 5-for-16 with a double and an RBI over six games with Lakeland. On July 31, the Tigers announced that Dirks would resume his rehab assignment, this time with the low Class A West Michigan Whitecaps.

=== Toronto Blue Jays ===
On October 31, 2014, Dirks was claimed off waivers by the Toronto Blue Jays. On December 2, Dirks was non-tendered by the Blue Jays, making him a free agent. On January 15, 2015, the Blue Jays re-signed him to a minor league contract. He was released by the Triple-A Buffalo Bisons on April 23 after having another season-ending back surgery.

== Post-playing career ==
Dirks sat in for Tigers' radio color commentator Jim Price for a number of the Tigers' home games during Price's 2023 illness and continued in that role following Price's death that August. He was brought back to do radio color commentary for 2024, expected to work about half of the Tigers' home games. He now does color commentary for Tigers' games on Detroit SportsNet.
