= Jairo Asencio =

Dominican baseball player (born 1983)

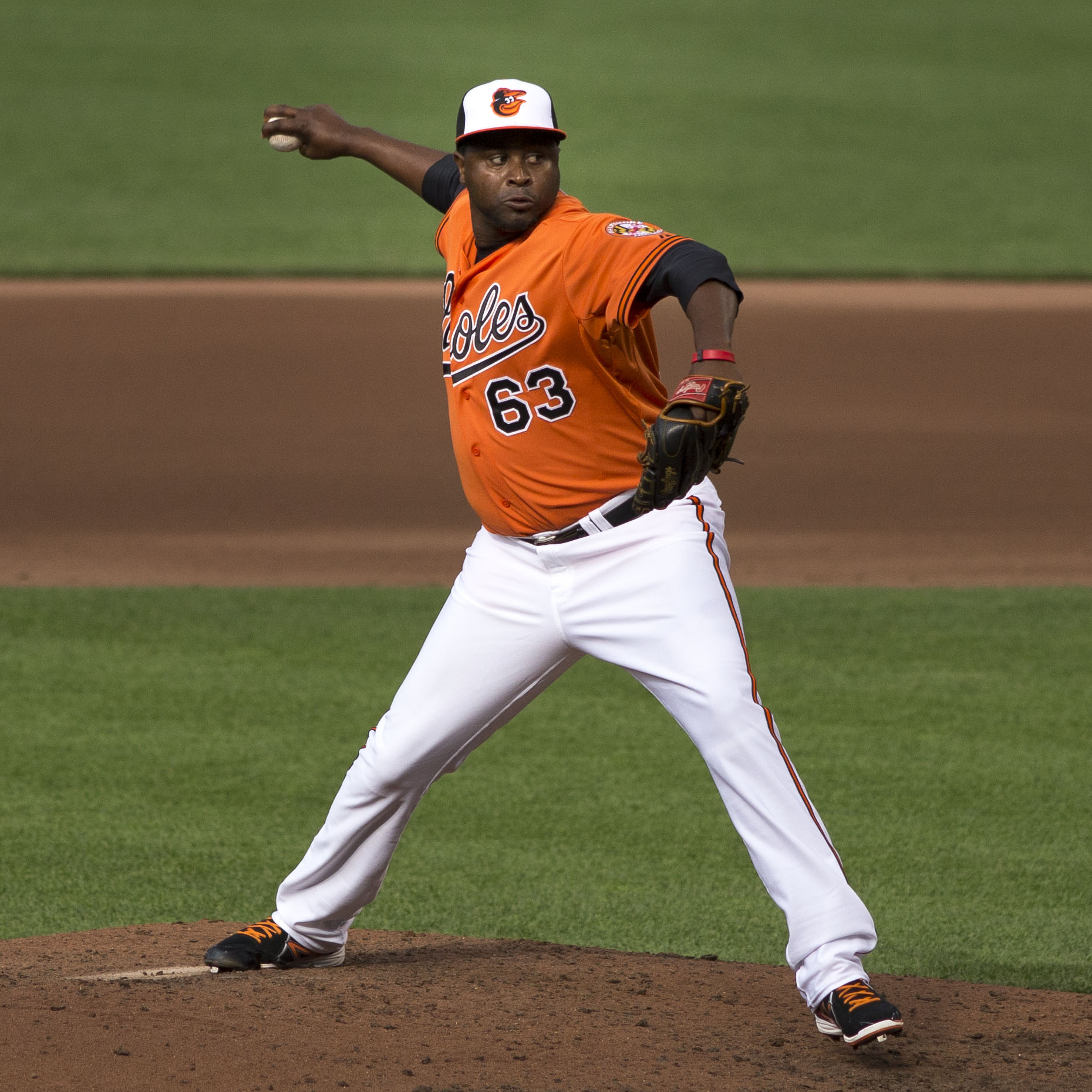
- Asencio with the Baltimore Orioles in 2013
- Relief pitcher
- Born: May 30, 1983 (age 43); Sabana Grande de Palenque, Dominican Republic
- Batted: Right Threw: Right

Professional debut
- MLB: July 12, 2009, for the Atlanta Braves
- KBO: March 29, 2014, for the Kia Tigers

Last appearance
- MLB: July 27, 2013, for the Baltimore Orioles
- KBO: October 8, 2014, for the Kia Tigers

MLB statistics
- Win–loss record: 1–2
- Earned run average: 5.34
- Strikeouts: 41

KBO statistics
- Win–loss record: 4-1
- Earned run average: 4.05
- Strikeouts: 56
- Stats at Baseball Reference

Teams
- Atlanta Braves (2009, 2011); Cleveland Indians (2012); Chicago Cubs (2012); Baltimore Orioles (2013); Kia Tigers (2014)
Medals
Men's baseball
Representing Dominican Republic
Olympic Games
Bronze medal – third place	2020 Tokyo	Team

Jairo Manuel Asencio (born May 30, 1983) is a Dominican professional baseball right-handed pitcher. He played in Major League Baseball (MLB) for the Atlanta Braves, Cleveland Indians, Chicago Cubs, and Baltimore Orioles, and in the KBO League for the Kia Tigers. He was the closer of The Tigres del Licey of the Dominican Professional Baseball League.

== Career ==
=== Pittsburgh Pirates ===
Asencio was first signed by the Pittsburgh Pirates in 2001.

=== Atlanta Braves ===
He was placed on the Atlanta Braves 40-man roster for the first time in 2009 when he made three appearances for the major league team, and later on April 16, 2011, to replace the disabled Peter Moylan. His Major League debut was on July 12, 2009, against the Colorado Rockies. On April 28, Asencio was optioned back to the Triple-A Gwinnett Braves.

For the entire 2010 Atlanta Braves season, Asencio was on the team's restricted list because of visa problems. It was discovered later in the year that Asencio had used a false name, Luis Valdez, and birthdate.

=== Cleveland Indians ===
On March 29, 2012, Asencio was traded to the Cleveland Indians in exchange for cash considerations. In 18 appearances for Cleveland, he compiled a 1–1 record and 5.96 ERA with 21 strikeouts across 25 2/3 innings pitched. Asencio was designated for assignment by the Indians on May 28.

=== Chicago Cubs ===
The Chicago Cubs claimed Asencio off waivers on June 1, 2012. In 12 games for the Cubs, he recorded a 3.07 ERA with 8 strikeouts across 14 2/3 innings pitched. On July 19, Asencio was designated for assignment by the Cubs. He cleared waivers and was sent outright to the Triple-A Iowa Cubs. Asencio elected free agency following the season on November 2.

=== Baltimore Orioles ===
On November 5, 2012, Asencio signed a minor league contract with the Milwaukee Brewers that included an invitation to spring training.

On March 25, 2013, Asencio was traded to the Baltimore Orioles in exchange for a player to be named later or cash. He started the season with the Triple-A Norfolk Tides. Asencio was recalled by the Orioles on July 12, and pitched one inning of relief against the Toronto Blue Jays that night. He was designated for assignment on July 28. Asencio cleared waivers and was sent outright to Norfolk on July 31. He elected free agency on October 4.

=== Kia Tigers ===
Asencio signed a deal with the Kia Tigers of the KBO League for the 2014 season.

=== Chicago White Sox ===
On January 22, 2015, Asencio signed a minor league contract with the Chicago White Sox. In 17 appearances out of the bullpen for the Triple-A Charlotte Knights, he registered a 5.03 ERA with 28 strikeouts and 9 saves over 19 2/3 innings pitched. Asencio was released by the White Sox organization on May 29.

=== Leones de Yucatán ===
On April 18, 2017, Asencio signed with the Leones de Yucatán of the Mexican League. In 25 games for Yucatán, he compiled a 2–1 record and 2.42 ERA with 28 strikeouts across 26 innings pitched. Asencio was released on June 6.

=== Saraperos de Saltillo ===
On May 23, 2019, Asencio signed with the Saraperos de Saltillo of the Mexican League. In 5 games, he recorded a 4.50 ERA with 2 strikeouts across 4 innings of work. Asencio was released on June 4.

On February 10, 2022, Asencio signed with the Mariachis de Guadalajara of the Mexican League. However, he was released prior to the start of the season on April 19.

Tigres Del Licey

In the 2026 off-season, after Licey failed to make the playoffs. Asencio was let go after many blown saves https://www.losmocanos.com/en/fuentes-tigres-del-licey-dejan-en-libertad-a-jairo-asencio-lisalverto-bonilla-y-anderson-hernandez/.

He also holds the Dominican Professional Baseball League's saves record.

On October 26, 2026, Asencio had a stroke in his home in the Dominican Republichttps://ground.news/article/jairo-asencio-suffers-from-an-acv
