= Bombo Rivera =

Puerto Rican baseball player (born 1952)

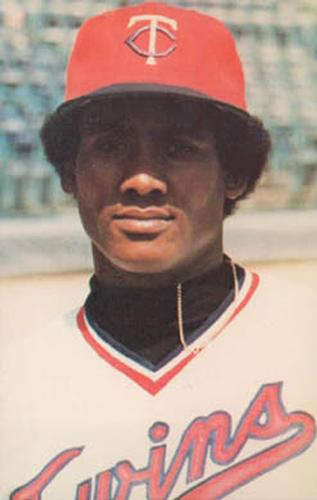
- Outfielder
- Born: August 2, 1952 (age 73); Ponce, Puerto Rico
- Batted: Right Threw: Right

Professional debut
- MLB: April 17, 1975, for the Montreal Expos
- NPB: 1985, for the Kintetsu Buffaloes

Last appearance
- MLB: October 3, 1982, for the Kansas City Royals
- NPB: 1986, for the Kintetsu Buffaloes

MLB statistics
- Batting average: .265
- Home runs: 10
- Runs batted in: 83

NPB statistics
- Batting average: .240
- Home runs: 37
- Runs batted in: 86
- Stats at Baseball Reference

Teams
- Montreal Expos (1975–1976); Minnesota Twins (1978–1980); Kansas City Royals (1982); Kintetsu Buffaloes (1985–1986)

Jesus "Bombo" Rivera Torres (born August 2, 1952) is a Puerto Rican former Major League Baseball outfielder. At the age of seven, his youth baseball manager started calling him "Bombo", meaning "fly ball," and the nickname stuck. Aside from baseball, Rivera also excelled in track and field. He ran the 100 meters and threw shot put at Ponce High School. He followed in the footsteps of his grandfather, who was known for his "bomba and plena" musical skills, and played percussion for Ponce's local bomba plena bands.

== Playing career ==
=== Minor leagues ===
Rivera signed with the Montreal Expos in 1970 and during his first season in the Expos farm system, while playing for the Gulf Coast League Expos in Bradenton, Florida, Rivera and some of his teammates took a trip to see the major league club play. The game was against the Pittsburgh Pirates, and Rivera finally got to see his idol Roberto Clemente play in right field.

=== Puerto Rican winter ball ===
From 1977 to 1986, Rivera played his Puerto Rican winter ball with the Mayaguez Indians. During the 1977–78 season, Mayaguez won the Puerto Rican league championship and Caribbean Series in Mazatlán, Mexico, with a record of 5–1. Rivera was an important part of the team that he calls the best he ever played with in Puerto Rico. Other players on that championship team included major leaguers Jim Dwyer, Ron LeFlore, José Morales, Iván DeJesús, Ed Romero, Rick Sweet, Willie Hernández, Danny Darwin, and Kurt Bevacqua. Rivera was named to the series All Star team.

=== Major league career ===
==== Expos career ====
After several seasons in the minors, Rivera made his major league debut in 1975 with the Expos. After playing just five games in the majors for Montreal that season, he spent the entire season in the majors in 1976, splitting time in left field with several other players, including Pepe Mangual, Del Unser, Mike Jorgensen, and Jerry White. In 68 games that season, Rivera batted .276. He spent the entire 1977 season back in the minors, and in October his contract was sold to the Minnesota Twins.

==== Back to the majors: Twins and Royals ====
Rivera was back in the major leagues in 1978, playing 101 games for the Twins and batting. 271. Rivera played in 112 games for the Twins in 1979, the most in his major league career. He hit .281/.324/.392, and was the starting left fielder for the season. However, after batting .221 for the Twins in 1980, he was released during spring training of 1981.

Although Rivera was signed by the Kansas City Royals shortly after his release by Minnesota, he did not log much more playing time in the majors, adding only five games to his career total, all in 1982. He was released the following spring.

=== On to Japan ===
His best professional season came in Japan with Kintetsu Buffaloes in 1985 and 1986 where he hit 37 home runs over the course of the two seasons, 31 of those in 1985. He was released by the team in 1986 due to a hamstring injury.

=== Later career and retirement ===
Rivera added another Puerto Rican League championship in the 1985–86 season. Also on that team were Bobby Bonilla, Wally Joyner, Tim Belcher, Paul O'Neill, Harold Reynolds, and Randy Ready. It was Rivera's last season in Mayagüez. He finished his Puerto Rican baseball career with the Arecibo Wolves in 1989.

Bombo Rivera played briefly for the St. Petersburg Pelicans of the Florida Senior Professional Baseball Association in 1989. Today he lives in Mayagüez, Puerto Rico and works for a non-profit organization that offers sports clinics to disadvantaged children free of charge. He also stays close to Puerto Rican youth baseball by umpiring local games.

== Cultural references ==
Rivera was the subject of a song in the late 1970s by Garrison Keillor named "The Ballad of Bombo Rivera." There is also a brief mention of Bombo Rivera in W. P. Kinsella's Shoeless Joe, the basis for the film Field of Dreams. Rivera also received hundreds of write-in votes in the 1979 University of Minnesota election for student council president, coming in second place.

== See also ==
- List of Major League Baseball players from Puerto Rico
