= 1978 Caribbean Series =

1978 baseball tournament

The twenty-first edition of the Caribbean Series (Serie del Caribe) was played in 1978. It was held from February 4 through February 9 with the champions teams from the Dominican Republic, Águilas Cibaeñas; Mexico, Tomateros de Culiacán; Puerto Rico, Indios de Mayagüez and Venezuela, Leones del Caracas. The format consisted of 12 games, each team facing the other teams twice, and the games were played at Estadio Teodoro Mariscal in Mazatlán, Mexico.

== Summary ==
Final standings
Club	W	L	W/L %	GB	Managers
Puerto Rico	5	1	.833	–	Rene Lachemann
Dominican Republic	3	3	.500	2.0	Johnny Lipon
Venezuela	3	3	.500	2.0	Felipe Alou
Mexico	1	5	.167	4.0	Raúl Cano

Individual leaders
Player/Club	Statistic
José Morales / PUR	Batting average	.421
Bob Molinaro / VEN	Runs	6
Bob Molinaro / VEN; José Morales / PUR	Hits	8
Gonzalo Márquez / VEN	Doubles	2
Ramón Avilés / PUR	Triples	1
Leon Roberts / VEN	Home runs	2
Leon Roberts / VEN	Runs batted in	6
Eight tied	Stolen bases	1
Diego Seguí / VEN	Wins	2
Diego Seguí / VEN	Strikeouts	17
Danny Darwin / PUR; Paul Mirabella / VEN	ERA	0.00
Four tied	Saves	1
Odell Jones / DOM; Diego Seguí / VEN	Innings pitched	12.0
Awards
José Morales / PUR	Most Valuable Player
Rene Lachemann / PUR	Manager

All-Star Team
Name/Club	Position
Rick Sweet / PUR	catcher
Raúl Colón / PUR	first baseman
Ramón Avilés / PUR	second baseman
Carlos Romero / PUR	shortstop
Kurt Bevacqua / PUR	third baseman
Leon Roberts / VEN	left fielder
Tony Armas / VEN	center fielder
Bombo Rivera / VEN	right fielder
José Morales / PUR	designated hitter
Danny Darwin / PUR	RH pitcher
Paul Mirabella / VEN	LH pitcher
Rene Lachemann / PUR	manager

=== Scoreboards ===
==== Game 1, February 4 ====
Team	1	2	3	4	5	6	7	8	9	R	H	E
Puerto Rico	0	0	0	0	2	0	0	0	0	2	10	0
Dominican Republic	0	0	0	0	0	0	0	0	0	0	5	0
WP: Danny Darwin (1-0) LP: Al Holland (0-1); Home runs: PUR: Jim Dwyer (1); DOM: None; Notes: Darwin pitched a complete game shutout.

==== Game 2, February 4 ====
Team	1	2	3	4	5	6	7	8	9	R	H	E
Venezuela	0	3	0	0	0	0	4	0	0	7	5	2
Mexico	0	1	0	0	0	0	0	0	2	3	6	3
WP: Diego Seguí (1-0) LP: George Brunet (0-1); Home runs: VEN: Greg Pryor (1), Leon Roberts (1); MEX: None

==== Game 3, February 5 ====
Team	1	2	3	4	5	6	7	8	9	R	H	E
Dominican Republic	2	6	2	0	0	0	0	0	2	12	16	0
Venezuela	0	0	0	0	0	0	0	0	0	0	3	0
WP: Odell Jones (1-0) LP: Gary Beare (0-1) Sv: George Frazier (1); Home runs: DOM: Rico Carty (1), Taylor Duncan (1); VEN: None

==== Game 4, February 5 ====
Team	1	2	3	4	5	6	7	8	9	R	H	E
Mexico	0	0	0	0	0	0	0	0	0	0	3	0
Puerto Rico	0	1	0	0	0	0	0	0	x	1	3	0
WP: Jesús Hernáiz (1-0) LP: Vicente Romo (0-1) Sv: Tom Bruno (1)

==== Game 5, February 6 ====
Team	1	2	3	4	5	6	7	8	9	R	H	E
Venezuela	2	1	0	0	2	1	0	0	0	6	13	0
Puerto Rico	0	0	0	1	6	0	0	0	x	7	10	2
WP: Steve Grilli (1-0) LP: Len Barker (0-1) Sv: Dennis Kinney (1)

==== Game 6, February 6 ====
Team	1	2	3	4	5	6	7	8	9	R	H	E
Dominican Republic	1	0	0	0	0	0	2	0	0	3	6	0
Mexico	0	0	0	0	0	0	0	0	0	0	3	0
WP: Nino Espinosa (1-0) LP: Tomás Armas (0-1); Notes: Espinosa pitched a complete game shutout.

==== Game 7, February 7 ====
Team	1	2	3	4	5	6	7	8	9	10	R	H	E
Dominican Republic	0	0	0	1	1	0	0	0	0	0	2	7	4
Puerto Rico	0	0	0	0	0	1	0	1	0	1	3	12	3
WP: Dennis Kinney (1-0) LP: Bill Castro (0-1); Home runs: DOM: None; PUR: Raúl Colón (1)

==== Game 8, February 7 ====
Team	1	2	3	4	5	6	7	8	9	R	H	E
Mexico	0	2	2	1	1	0	0	1	0	7	10	2
Venezuela	0	0	0	1	1	0	0	0	0	2	6	4
WP: Guadalupe Salinas (1-0) LP: Cardell Camper (0-1)

==== Game 9, February 8 ====
Team	1	2	3	4	5	6	7	8	9	R	H	E
Venezuela	0	0	0	0	0	2	0	1	1	4	8	1
Dominican Republic	0	0	0	0	0	0	0	0	0	0	1	4
WP: Paul Mirabella (1-0) LP: Al Holland (0-1) Sv: Len Barker (1); Home runs: VEN: None; DOM: Leon Roberts (2); Notes: Mirabella pitched six-plus perfect innings and lost the no-hitter in the 8th frame.

==== Game 10, February 8 ====
Team	1	2	3	4	5	6	7	8	9	R	H	E
Puerto Rico	0	0	0	0	1	6	0	2	0	9	9	0
Mexico	0	0	0	0	0	3	0	0	0	3	4	6
WP: Tom Bruno (1-0) LP: George Brunet (0-2)

==== Game 11, February 9 ====
Team	1	2	3	4	5	6	7	8	9	R	H	E
Puerto Rico	1	0	0	1	0	0	0	0	0	2	7	1
Venezuela	2	0	2	0	0	0	0	3	x	7	9	0
WP: Diego Seguí (2-0) LP: Bobby Cuellar (0-1); Home runs: PUR: None; VEN: Tony Armas (1)

==== Game 12, February 9 ====
Team	1	2	3	4	5	6	7	8	9	R	H	E
Mexico	1	0	0	0	0	0	0	2	1	4	6	0
Dominican Republic	0	1	1	0	0	0	0	2	1	5	7	0
WP: Silvio Martínez (1-0) LP: Horacio Piña (0-1)

== See also ==
- Ballplayers who have played in the Series

== Sources ==
- Antero Núñez, José. Series del Caribe. Impresos Urbina, Caracas, Venezuela.
- Araujo Bojórquez, Alfonso. Series del Caribe: Narraciones y estadísticas, 1949-2001. Colegio de Bachilleres del Estado de Sinaloa, Mexico.
- Figueredo, Jorge S. Cuban Baseball: A Statistical History, 1878–1961. Macfarland & Co., United States.
- González Echevarría, Roberto. The Pride of Havana. Oxford University Express.
- Gutiérrez, Daniel. Enciclopedia del Béisbol en Venezuela, Caracas, Venezuela.
