= 1983 Southern League season =

- League: Southern League
- Sport: Baseball
- Duration: April 8 – August 31
- Number of games: 146
- Number of teams: 10

Regular season
- League champions: Birmingham Barons
- Season MVP: John Morris, Jacksonville Suns

Playoffs
- League champions: Birmingham Barons
- Runners-up: Jacksonville Suns

SL seasons
- ← 1982 1984 →

The 1983 Southern League was a Class AA baseball season played between April 8 and August 31. Ten teams played a 146-game schedule, with the top team in each division in each half of the season qualifying for the post-season.

The Birmingham Barons won the Southern League championship, as they defeated the Jacksonville Suns in the playoffs.

== Team changes ==
- The Chattanooga Lookouts ended their affiliation with the Cleveland Indians and began a new affiliation with the Seattle Mariners.

== Teams ==
1983 Southern League
Division	Team	City	MLB Affiliate	Stadium
East	Charlotte Orioles	Charlotte, North Carolina	Baltimore Orioles	Jim Crockett Memorial Park
East	Columbus Astros	Columbus, Georgia	Houston Astros	Golden Park
East	Jacksonville Suns	Jacksonville, Florida	Kansas City Royals	Wolfson Park
East	Orlando Twins	Orlando, Florida	Minnesota Twins	Tinker Field
East	Savannah Braves	Savannah, Georgia	Atlanta Braves	Grayson Stadium
West	Birmingham Barons	Birmingham, Alabama	Detroit Tigers	Rickwood Field
West	Chattanooga Lookouts	Chattanooga, Tennessee	Seattle Mariners	Engel Stadium
West	Knoxville Blue Jays	Knoxville, Tennessee	Toronto Blue Jays	Bill Meyer Stadium
West	Memphis Chicks	Memphis, Tennessee	Montreal Expos	Tim McCarver Stadium
West	Nashville Sounds	Nashville, Tennessee	New York Yankees	Herschel Greer Stadium

== Map of teams ==
East Division West Division

== Regular season ==
=== Summary ===
- The Birmingham Barons finished the season with the best record in the league for the first time since 1967.

=== Standings ===
East Division
Team	Win	Loss	%	GB
Savannah Braves	81	64	.559	–
Jacksonville Suns	77	68	.531	4
Charlotte Orioles	69	77	.473	12.5
Columbus Astros	64	79	.448	16
Orlando Twins	62	83	.428	19
West Division
Birmingham Barons	91	54	.628	–
Nashville Sounds	88	58	.603	4
Chattanooga Lookouts	68	75	.476	22
Knoxville Blue Jays	64	82	.438	27.5
Memphis Chicks	61	85	.418	30.5

== League Leaders ==
=== Batting leaders ===
Stat	Player	Total
AVG	Iván Calderón, Chattanooga Lookouts	.311
H	Iván Calderón, Chattanooga Lookouts	170
R	George Foussianes, Birmingham Barons	106
2B	Larry Sheets, Charlotte Orioles	37
3B	Iván Calderón, Chattanooga Lookouts	15
HR	Glenn Davis, Columbus Astros; Larry Sheets, Charlotte Orioles	25
RBI	Miguel Sosa, Savannah Braves	93
SB	Mike Cole, Savannah Braves	75

=== Pitching leaders ===
Stat	Player	Total
W	Don Heinkel, Birmingham Barons	19
ERA	Roger Mason, Birmingham Barons	2.06
CG	Don Heinkel, Birmingham Barons	13
SHO	John Cerutti, Knoxville Blue Jays; Keith Comstock, Birmingham Barons; Jeff Heathcock, Columbus Astros; Kelly Scott, Nashville Sounds; Mark Shiflett, Nashville Sounds; Benny Snyder, Columbus Astros	3
SV	Dave Shipanoff, Knoxville Blue Jays	18
IP	Don Heinkel, Birmingham Barons	207.1
SO	Mark Gubicza, Jacksonville Suns	146

== Playoffs ==
- The Birmingham Barons won their second Southern League championship, defeating the Jacksonville Suns in four games.

=== Playoff bracket ===
Division finals
E1	Jacksonville	3
E2	Savannah	1
W1	Birmingham	3
W2	Nashville	2

Finals
E1	Jacksonville	1
W1	Birmingham	3

== Awards ==
Southern League awards
Award name	Recipient
Most Valuable Player	John Morris, Jacksonville Suns
Pitcher of the Year	Don Heinkel, Birmingham Barons
Manager of the Year	Roy Majtyka, Birmingham Barons

== See also ==
- 1983 Major League Baseball season
