= Indios de Mayagüez =

Professional baseball team in Mayagüez, Puerto Rico

Logo	Cap insignia

Information
- League: Roberto Clemente Professional Baseball League
- Location: Mayagüez, Puerto Rico
- Ballpark: Isidoro García Stadium
- Founded: 1938
- Caribbean Series championships: 2 (1978, 1992)
- League championships: 20 (1949, 1957, 1963, 1966, 1978, 1984, 1986, 1988, 1989, 1992, 1997, 1998, 1999, 2003, 2005, 2010, 2012, 2014, 2023, 2025)
- Colors: Burgundy and gold
- Manager: Wilfredo Cordero
- Website: www.indioslbprc.com

Current uniforms
Home	Away	Third

Indios de Mayagüez (Mayagüez Indians) are a baseball team in Puerto Rico's Liga de Béisbol Profesional Roberto Clemente (Roberto Clemente Professional Baseball League, in Spanish). Based in Mayagüez, the Indios have won 20 national championships and 2 Caribbean World Series. The Indios have participated in a league’s record 40 Finals. It is one of three teams remaining from the original 6 incorporated into the LBPPR at its founding on November 13, 1938.

The Indios were named after the formerly named Cervecería India (now the Compañía Cervecera de Puerto Rico, or CCC), the local brewery, and its formal sponsor over most of the team's 85-year run) besides the fact that Mayagüez, located at the western coast of Puerto Rico, has a strong indigenous heritage, starting with the city's name (which is derived from the Taíno language). The team's colors are burgundy, gold and blue, which at one time were the colors on the label of Cerveza India, the original flagship product of the brewery which promoted the team and served as base for its name.

The Indios de Mayagüez team is the team with the second most championship wins in PRBL history (twenty, as of January 24, 2025). It has reached the PRBL final series 40 times (as of said date). At a time when most Puerto Rican cities and towns are better known for their support of basketball, the city of Mayagüez remains as a strong baseball stronghold in the island nation. The team's fan base has a reputation for loyalty bordering in the extreme, and average game attendance, and total season attendance by the Indios has been the highest in the Puerto Rico winter league during each of the past five seasons. Debuting in the 1949 tournament, the Indios are one of a handful of teams to have participated in both the classic and contemporary formats of the Caribbean Series.

At any given year — should the Indios make it to the PRBL tournament playoffs — attendance to the team's baseball park and post -game celebrations tend to be particularly high because they usually coincide with the celebration of the patron saint feasts (fiestas patronales) for the city of Mayagüez; it is not unusual for a championship game to coincide with Candlemas (2 February) or Candlemas Eve.

The Indios' management team is led by general manager and international cross checker from the Arizona Diamondbacks Hector Otero. The team's administrator is Mayagüez native and entrepreneur CPA José Julio Feliciano. Mako Oliveras, the winningest manager in Puerto Rico’s Winter League history with eight championships under his helm is the team's current manager (as of the 2023-2024 season).

== History ==
=== The early years ===
Baseball had been played in Mayagüez since the Spanish–American War; a city yearbook from the 1870s claimed that the very same day troops of the United States Army invaded the city (August 11, 1898), the troops played an impromptu baseball game on the city's main plaza. However, evidence tends to confirm that baseball became a regular pastime in the city by 1902.

Mayagüez had semi-professional baseball teams prior to the 1938 founding of the team, through various inceptions. The earliest team was named "Pope-Hartford" (after the automotive brand), and was organized in 1905 by Santiago Panzardi, the brand's importer. It was later substituted by a succession of teams: the Mayagüez Cardinals, the Yaguez, and others. These teams played games against organized teams from the rest of the island, Venezuela and Cuba, as well as teams assembled from Negro league baseball players. The Indios were born from the amateur team Al Día property of Félix Santiago, which was bought by Alfonso Valdez Cobián of Cervecería India. Coached by Enrique Huyke, the team debuted on November 13, 1938, splitting a double header with the Criollos. The team's first stadium was Estadio Santiago Llórens. In first year of the Semi-Pro, José Figueroa led in strikeouts (96).

Once the LBPPR was created, the Mayagüez team became a part of it. In 1939, Figueroa became the first to strike 100 players, finishing with 137. A management team led by Alfonso Valdés Cobián owned the team during its initial years, between 1938 and 1957. On February 18, 1940, Ramón Bayrón became the first player to hit three triples in a game.

In 1943, Mayagüez signed 18-year old Santiago Muratti from the local Double A league for $18 per week, joining Luis Villodas as catcher. The subsequent acquisition of Humberto Martí made it the only team in the league to have three catchers. After lights were installed at Sixto Escobar Stadium in 1947, the Indios played in the inaugural game, with Muratti at catcher. On December 30, 1947, the Indios won the league’s first round after Earl Taborn pushed Muratti (who had also batted three hits against Paige) and the empire ruled that he was out for interfering with the catcher. The play was controversial and was reviewed by experts from abroad, but the result was withheld. Taborn and other players were fined for the incident and the subsequent meltdown. On February 8, 1948, Johnny Davis pitched the second no-hitter in the league, in a game which Mayagüez defeated Aguadilla 1-0.

The Indios won their first LBPPR championship in 1949. Originally the Indios played their home games in the facilities of La Liga de París., now named the Santiago Lloréns baseball park, which has been in use since February 14, 1912. The team moved from their previous grounds to then-new 9,587-seat Isidoro García Baseball Stadium, located near the southwest corner of the city, on October 15, 1949. In 1950, the Indios were relocated to Aguadilla and were later fused with San Juan.

=== The Babel Pérez era ===
Babel Pérez assumed the management of the Indios after Alfonso Valdés. (He had worked for Don Alfonso since the late '40s) The Indios won two championships under his helm, in 1962–1963 and 1965–1966. Joe Christopher was a major player for the Indios during the period.

Entering the 1970s, the team experienced both economic and competitive difficulties that endangered its permanency at Mayagüez. Pérez died suddenly in Bamberg, Germany in 1971, while visiting one of his daughters and new grandson, the great Ovidio Enrique Pérez II. Gloria Méndez Pérez, widow of Babel Pérez, owned the team until its sale in 1974, entering into baseball history as the first female to own a baseball team.

=== The Luis Gómez Monagas era ===
A new management team led by Luis Gómez Monagas, a successful insurance businessman, and father (and later one-time Uncle-in-law of Colombian actor and folk singer Carlos Vives) bought the Indios in 1974. At the time, after winning the 1965–66 league championship the Indios had had a dry spell, having earned only two championships in more than 15 years and consistently ending in last place in every LBPPR tournament between the 1966–67 season and the 1973–74 season, except the 1969–70, when the team made the playoffs in a very surprising fashion. On two occasions, the franchise threatened to move to Bayamón, but popular support kept the team in Mayagüez both times. To make matters worse, the Isidoro García baseball stadium was in such a state of disrepair that it was literally unsafe for fans, players and field keepers. For the 1974-75, Monagas began an overhaul that bore fruit during the following seasons for the team. During the 1970s, WAEL served as the Indios' station with Ismael Trabal, Pito Hernández, Arturo Soto and Israel Peña as narrators. Announcer Ramón S. Olivencia popularized the phrase Los Indios de mi pueblo, which became a pseudonym for the team. Ribaudo and Schaeffer designed a logo for the Indios which in 1975 won a design award at New York.

==== The historic 1977–1978 team ====
During the 1977 offseason, the Indios recruited new talent and made a number of changes. The 1977–1978 team literally saved the franchise from bankruptcy and oblivion. Managed by Rene Lacheman, and provided with a powerful lineup that featured Ron LeFlore, Jim Dwyer, Kurt Bevacqua and José Manuel Morales in the 1-4 spots, the team barely made it to the playoffs, finishing the regular season with a record of 29-31 and in the fourth place. The Indios advanced to the final with a 4:1 series win over the Criollos. In the final, Mayagüez's pitching dominated the Vaqueros for a 4:2 series win. The final game for the series had Mayagüez beat Bayamón with a score of 18–2. The win was celebrated among the populace, which gathered at Plaza de Colón. The team eventually made it to Mazatlán, Mexico, where it won the 1978 Caribbean Series. The Indios finished the tournament with a 5-1 record after using the reserves in the final game. This was also celebrated among the public, with an impromptu parade to the City Hall. The team was involved in additional festivities upon returning to Puerto Rico.

The 1977-78 championship had a direct effect on the team’s popularity throughout the region, reigniting following after several decades of decline. This was a turning point in the team's history. Fan support gave the Indios' management team enough financial solvency to save the franchise. From winning only three championships in 40 years, the team went on to win 13 championships in the 34 years following the 1978 season. Collective fan protests demanded repairs to the baseball stadium from its owner, the then-named Parks and Leisure Administration of Puerto Rico (now called the Puerto Rico Department of Recreation and Sports), a government agency that still owns and controls the new stadium that has since replaced the old one. The stadium was remodeled soon after (1980) and Rai García took over as general manager of the team. In 1980-81, Mayagüez was coached by Orlando Gómez and opened the 1980-81 season defeating the Cangrejeros 5-3. Iván Méndez was in charge of announcing, while the band of University of Puerto Rico at Mayagüez (RUM) collaborated. On January 6, 1982, Estadio Isidoro García hosted the league All-Star Game in which Metro defeated Isla with a no-hitter. Dickie Thon decided the game and was MVP. Beginning in 1982-83, Frank Verdi managed the team. In 1983-84, Mayagüez defeated Ponce in the finals, in a series that was decided in a seventh game that extended into overtime and featured the expelling of the Leones' manager. The Indios reinforced with Cándido Maldonado, Carmelo Martínez, Orlando Sánchez, Tom Lawless, Chuck Porter and Craig Lefferts for the Caribbean Series. However, Mayagüez's only win in the tournament was over the Mexican representative, 14-2. This influenced the attendance of the event, which was locally hosted at Estadio Hiram Bithorn, and recorded the worst average for a Caribbean Series up to that point. For the Indios, it marked the last time that pitcher Saúl López was with the team. For the 1984-85 season, Mayagüez was eliminated by the Metros despite assembling a competitive team that became known for its speed in the bags. In 1985-86, Wally Joyner won the league triple crown while playing for Mayagüez. Muratti' s career with the Indios earned him and induction into that municipality's Hall of Fame in 1986 and the team's Medalla Alfonso Váldes. In 1987-88, Mayagüez experienced a complicated route to the finals, where they bested the Cangrejeros by making a comeback after being down 2:3 in the series. After losing their first game to Caracas, Mayagüez failed to win the Caribbean Series, despite defeating the eventual champions Leones del Escogido. Parallel to this, Alfonso Valdez died at Puerto Rico and a moment of silence for him and former player Francisco Vélez was held before the Indios' win over Tijuana that allowed them to compile a 3-3 record that gave them the second place. Managed by Nick Leyva, Mayagüez contested the 1985-86 finals against the Metros, winning the title as visitors. At the Caribbean Series, the Indios entered the four date tied with a 2-2 record with the other three teams, but ultimately lost a decisive game to Mexicali. The Indios under Gomez ownership went on to win two more championships (87–88, 88-89) for a total of five during his tenure.

=== The Luis Iván Méndez era ===
In 1989 Gomez sold the team to Luis Iván Méndez, a former commentator for the team's radio broadcasts. This was a controversial move, since Méndez's extreme passion for the team was viewed with skepticism by some local fans, who considered him to be brash, arrogant, and motivated chiefly by money. As a broadcaster, Méndez had been a devil's advocate during the team's lean years, providing much necessary feedback to improve its lineup, but his comments were rather blunt at times, something that alienated team fans (he was even confrontational with a few of them). The fact that Méndez was the first non-native of the city to own the team (Méndez was a native of nearby San Sebastián, Puerto Rico) did not help. Some fans even suspected Méndez of wanting to move the team to his hometown, which had a successful AA League franchise.

Objectively, though, Méndez not only attempted to raise fan support to a near-religious status, but was also responsible for five championships and three runner-up spots. He was responsible for establishing or endorsing many team rituals, changing the team's colors to burgundy and gold, and even demanding that the Indios wear their own uniform (and not wear one with the name "Puerto Rico") when going to the Caribbean World Series. Many fans decided to have a love-hate relationship with Méndez, praising his business smarts and baseball acumen while hating him personally.

=== The Daniel Aquino era ===
Méndez, who had grown tired of public criticism against him (and who faced a suspension from the LBPPR for assaulting a league peer), sold ownership of the team to Daniel Aquino, a native of the Dominican Republic who had earned a Mechanical Engineering degree from the nearby University of Puerto Rico at Mayagüez. The fans' reaction to Aquino, who was once the owner of the Leones del Escogido of the Dominican winter league, made the backlash against Méndez pale in comparison. Aquino had experienced considerable criticism in his home country for "watering down" the Leones' roster due to escalating payroll costs. Xenophobia played a role in criticism against Aquino, who repeatedly countered by saying that he had strong personal ties to Puerto Rico and Mayagüez, and that after his experience with the Leones' he had realized that he would not jump into managing any other baseball team if he didn't have a personal stake in the team's outcome.

However, Aquino proved to be a successful owner, helped in part by the inclusion of yet another controversial (and very vocal) baseball executive, Carlos Pieve, to his management team (this time as general manager). Aquino's first year as owner had the Indios win a league championship (2003), only to have them end up last the following year (2004), and subsequently win yet another championship the next year (2005). The 2005-06 season of the Indios was dedicated to Muratti and journalist Gabriel Castro. The team lost the 2006 final series against the Gigantes de Carolina and lost again against the team in the semifinal round of the 2007 playoffs. In 2007, Estadio Isidoro García was abandoned for demolishing, marking the first home arena change since 1949, having hosted 14 out of the 15 championships won by the team up to that point.

As their home stadium, Isidoro García Baseball Stadium, was demolished and rebuilt to host the 2010 Central American and Caribbean Games, the Indios were forced to relocate temporarily to nearby Aguadilla, Puerto Rico. They played at Luis A. Canena Marquez Stadium, under the name "Indios-Tiburones", a marketing concept that evoked the Tiburones de Aguadilla (Aguadilla Sharks), a now-defunct LBPPR team that was active in the 1940s and 1950s.

== Puerto Rico Baseball League (PRBL) ==
On November 18, 2009, the Lobos defeated the Indios. After defeating the Indios on November 19, 2009, the Gigantes gained the league's lead for a brief period of time. On November 25, 2009, the Indios defeated the Leones to win their fourth game of the season.

Mayagüez finished in fourth place in the regular season (2009–2010). They defeated the Lobos 4 games to 3 in the playoff to advance to their 30th championship series.

Indios de Mayagüez won their 16th championship (most in the PRBL) when they beat Criollos de Caguas 4 games to 1. Three games in this series went to extra innings.

== Best known former MLB players ==
Major League Baseball players who played with the Indios include Dennis McClain, Boog Powell, Bradin Hagens, Jim Northrup, Willie Horton, Mickey Lolich, Jack Morris, Dave McNally, Tommy Lasorda, Ron LeFlore, Kurt Bevacqua, Lance Parrish, Paul O'Neill, Jeff Brantley, Ken Caminiti, Zack Greinke, Doug Glanville, Harold Reynolds, Dennis Martínez, Danny Valencia, and Wally Joyner.

Local MLB stars who were also part of the Indios are Bombo Rivera, Willie Hernández, José Guzmán, Iván Calderón, Roberto Hernández, Iván Rodríguez, Bobby Bonilla, Wil Cordero, Jorge Posada, Eddie Rosario, and José Vidro. Cordero was raised at the by-now razed Cócora section of town, which used to exist across the street from Isidoro García Baseball Stadium.

== LBPPR Championships (team managers) ==
- 1948–49: Artie Wilson
- 1956–57: Mickey Owen
- 1962–63: Cal Ermer
- 1965-66: Wayne Blackburn
- 1977–78: Rene Lachemann
- 1983–84: Frank Verdi
- 1985–86: Nick Leyva
- 1987–88: Jim Riggleman
- 1988–89: Tom Gamboa
- 1991–92: Pat Kelly
- 1996–97: Tom Gamboa
- 1997–98: Tom Gamboa
- 1998–99: Al Newman
- 2002–03: Nick Leyva
- 2004–05: Mako Oliveras
- 2009–10: Mako Oliveras
- 2011–12: Dave Miley
- 2013–14: Carlos Baerga
- 2022–23: Mako Oliveras
- 2024–25: Wilfredo Coldero

== Caribbean Series record ==
Year	Venue	Finish	Wins	Losses	Win%	Manager
1949	(Cuba) Havana	4th	1	5	.167	(United States) Artie Wilson
1957	(Cuba) Havana	3rd	2	4	.333	(United States) Mickey Owen
1978	(Mexico) Mazatlán	1st	5	1	.833	(United States) Rene Lachemann
1984	(Puerto Rico) San Juan	4th	1	4	.200	(United States) Frank Verdi
1986	(Venezuela) Maracaibo	4th	2	4	.333	(United States) Nick Leyva
1988	(Dominican Republic) Santo Domingo	2nd	3	3	.500	(United States) Jim Riggleman
1989	(Mexico) Mazatlán	2nd	4	2	.667	(United States) Tom Gamboa
1992	(Mexico) Hermosillo	1st	5	2	.714	(United States) Pat Kelly
1997	(Mexico) Hermosillo	4th	2	4	.333	(United States) Tom Gamboa
1998	(Venezuela) Puerto La Cruz	2nd	4	2	.667	(United States) Tom Gamboa
1999	(Puerto Rico) San Juan	2nd	4	2	.667	(United States) Al Newman
2003	(Puerto Rico) Carolina	2nd	5	2	.714	(United States) Nick Leyva
2005	(Mexico) Mazatlán	4th	1	5	.167	(Puerto Rico) Mako Oliveras
2010	(Venezuela) Margarita Island	2nd	4	2	.667	(Puerto Rico) Mako Oliveras
2012	(Dominican Republic) Santo Domingo	2nd	3	3	.500	(United States) Dave Miley
2014	(Venezuela) Margarita Island	2nd	3	3	.500	(Puerto Rico) Carlos Baerga
2023	(Venezuela) Greater Caracas	5th	4	3	.571	(Puerto Rico) Mako Oliveras
Total			53	51	.510	

== The Mayagüez All-Time All-Star Team ==
In December 2003 a panel of five local sportscasters announced their picks for an Indios de Mayagüez All-Time All Star Team. This selection considered candidates from Indios teams from the previous 65 years. Their selected team lists as follows:

- Denny McLain, P (RH)
- Dave McNally, P (LH)
- Lance Parrish, C
- Brian Johnson, C
- Wally Joyner, 1B
- Carlos Manuel Santiago, 2B
- Artie Wilson, SS
- Kurt Bevacqua, 3B
- Wilmer Fields, 3B (sometimes P, 1B)
- Jim Dwyer, LF
- Jim Northrup, CF
- Luis A. "Canena" Márquez, RF
- Lucius "Luke" Easter, DB

As of 2014, there has been talk among Mayaguez's sporting press community of updating the list sometime during the year.

== Retired numbers ==
Number	Name	Position
4	Humberto "Pita" Martí	Catcher
13	Ceferino "Cefo" Conde	Pitcher
21	Roberto Clemente Walker (retired from all LBPPR teams)	Right Fielder
22	José "Tony" Valentín	Shortstop
23	Luis "Mambo" de León	Pitcher

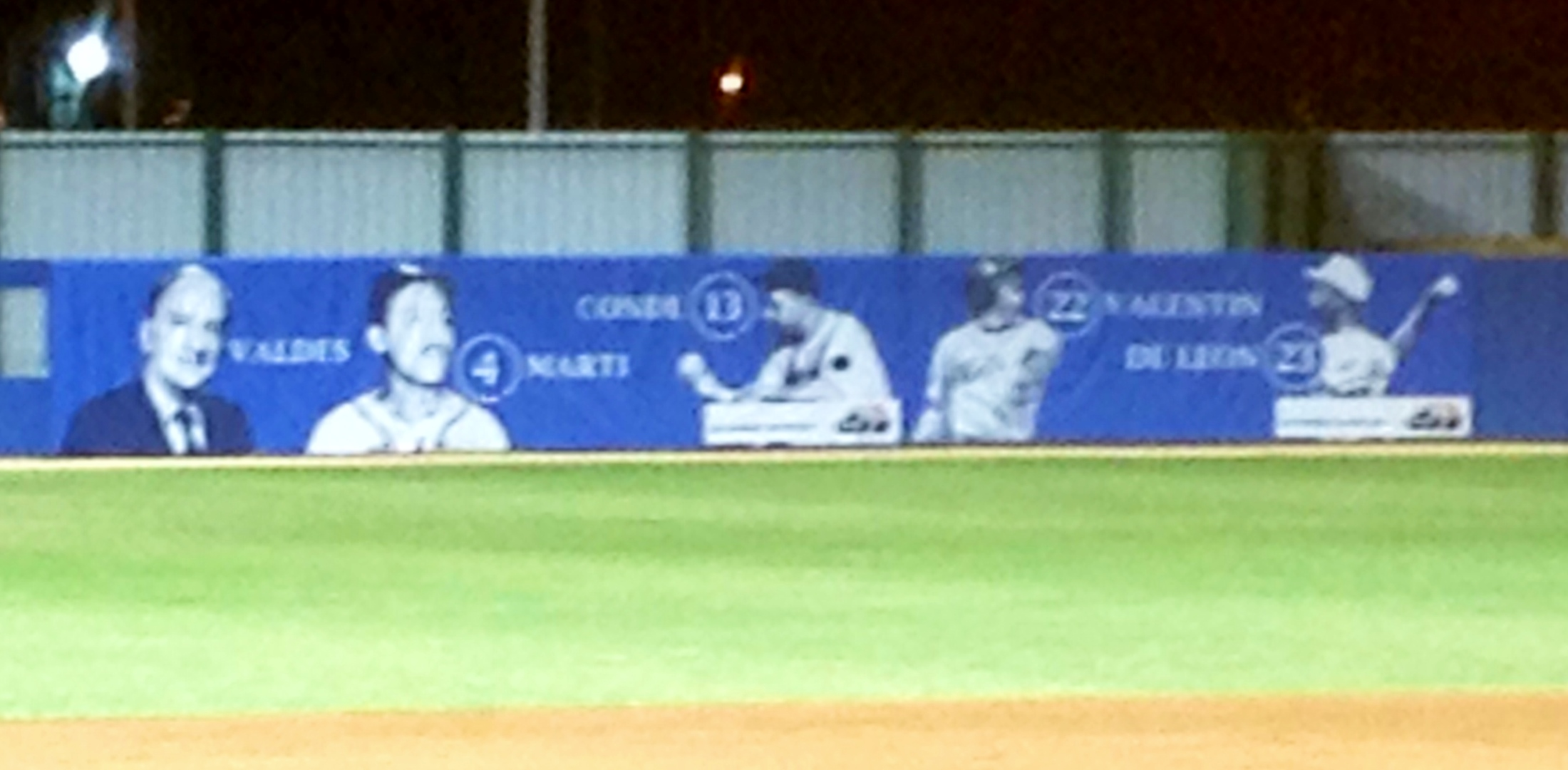
Portraits of Alfonso Valdés Cobian and the Indios team members whose numbers have been retired.

== Indios iconography and traditions ==
=== Los Indios de mi pueblo ===
A comment made on a broadcast by David Castro (see below) gave the team a moniker: "Los Indios de mi pueblo" ("My hometown's Indians"). Ramón S. Olivencia, a long-time news anchorman for various Puerto Rican news radio stations, and who was also born in Mayagüez, also made a habit of mentioning the phrase instead of reading the team's name, whenever he had to read baseball scores from the previous night on his broadcasts. The phrase stuck and it is still in common use, long after Olivencia's passing. It is usually the reference in use by native "mayagüezanos" when referring to the team.

The Indios de Mayagüez were initially sponsored by the local Cervecería India, founded in 1938 by local businessman Alfonso Valdés Cobián. For a while after Valdés' passing, the initials "AVC" were added to the left sleeve of all team uniforms, in honor of the team's first owner. Once the Indios moved back to the rebuilt Isidoro García Stadium, Valdés' picture was incorporated to the left field fence, along with pictures of those team players whose numbers have been retired.

=== ¡Ahí vienen los Indios!, the unofficial team song ===
External videos
- You may listen to ¡Ahí vienen los Indios! here

The unofficial team song for the Indios is ¡Ahí vienen los Indios!, a Dominican merengue recorded by the 1959 lineup of the Billo's Caracas Boys orchestra, led by its longtime conductor, Billo Frómeta, and augmented by two former Billo's bandmates, Ernesto Chapuseaux and Francisco Simó Damirón, who had reunited with Frómeta for the occasion. The song is usually played at the game's Seventh-inning stretch.

==== Other songs referring to the team ====
The city of Mayagüez has a formal anthem, "Mayagüez, Mi Mayagüez", written by local music professor Luciano Quiñones, but before the song was commissioned as such, the city's unofficial theme song was (and still is) Cesar Concepción's plena A Mayagüez, which references the team. Other themes were El Mayagüez Invencible and Hay vienen los Indios. The song suggests that the singer will visit the city to "vacilar con los Indios, que en verdad echan candela" ("have fun with the Indios, which are really on fire lately")."

A historical (yet unofficial) team song is the plena "El Mayagüez Invencible", which is generally attributed to Ceferino "Cefo" Conde, a pitcher (and baseball philosopher) who played for multiple PRBL teams, and who was instrumental to the Indios' first championship win in 1949. The plena names every single Mayagüez player in the 1949 team's initial lineup, along with their playing position.

Mon Rivera, who was a successful shortstop with the Indios before becoming an even more successful bandleader, wrote a humorous song about an anecdote he experienced while he was related to the team. It makes mention of Humberto "Pita" Martí, one of the team's catchers. Martí was good enough as a catcher to deserve having his number eventually retired by the team. Apparently, though, his English language skills were not as good. Since the team featured major baseball players from the United States, interaction among players had to happen in English, Spanish, Spanglish, sign language or a combination thereof. Apparently Martí was asked "how do you feel?" before a game, to which he replied: "yo no juego field, lo que juego es catcher de Mayagüez" ("I'm not a fielder, I play catcher for Mayagüez"). The joke persisted enough to deserve a song, "¿Cómo está Pita?"

=== Indio de Mayagüez, the team's original mascot ===
Between the late 1970s, and the early 2000s, the "Indio de Mayagüez" character became an unofficial cheerleader of the team. During the 2011–12 season the Indio made a short-lived comeback. The Indio, interpreted by Ervin Santana, is namely a costumed fan wearing a woolen poncho and feathered headdress who demands cheers from the audience for the local team and boos for the visitors. The Indio then finishes his session by placing a handkerchief (or a banner borrowed from a fan) on one side of the Indios dugout's roof, walking to the opposite side, and then running and sliding towards the handkerchief to pick it up head-first, as if he were stealing a base.

At one time during the late 1990s, the cheerleader sled past the dugout's roof and landed on a nearby staircase, fracturing a leg and three ribs. After a long convalescence, the Indio returned to his usual chanting grounds on top of the stadium's first base dugout, calling for cheers wearing a cast and crutches. At times the Indio is allowed into the infield, runs the bases, and steals home plate. Santana continued to serve this role until 2005. He became a fixture along the Sonora del Bacalao, which debuted during the 1980s.

=== Bompy, the (overloaded) Indios mascot ===
As of the 2013–14 season, Bompy, a cartoon character originally developed for the Indios de Mayaguez basketball team, has also made his appearance in the baseball team's games. Bompy, a mischievous kid, has its own Facebook page, and is a popular character among both teams' younger fans.

== Radio broadcasts ==
The Indios de Mayagüez radio broadcast crew has had one constant member during the last forty-seven years (as of 2026), radio announcer Arturo Soto Cardona. A native of nearby San Sebastián, Puerto Rico, Soto has been narrating Indios' games since 1977.

Fiercely territorial as some Indios fans are, a common practice for many of them is to turn the volume down on television broadcasts featuring the Indios, and turning a radio set on to the official Indios radio broadcast, which is aired on station WYEL-AM (600 kHz) and streamcasted over the Internet. Soto's vocal inflections are so well recognized by fans that by just listening to his voice many can identify the difference between a pop-up fly and a hit before the ball actually lands.

A former member of the broadcast team, commercial spot coordinator David Castro had a reputation for having attended all Indios games home and abroad (except for one non-local game during the early 1960s) since the team's inception in 1938 until his formal retirement in 2005.

== Documentary ==
A documentary about the team named "Los Indios de mi pueblo" and directed by Emmanuel Díaz, was issued in 2011.
