= Toby Harrah =

American baseball player and coach (born 1948)

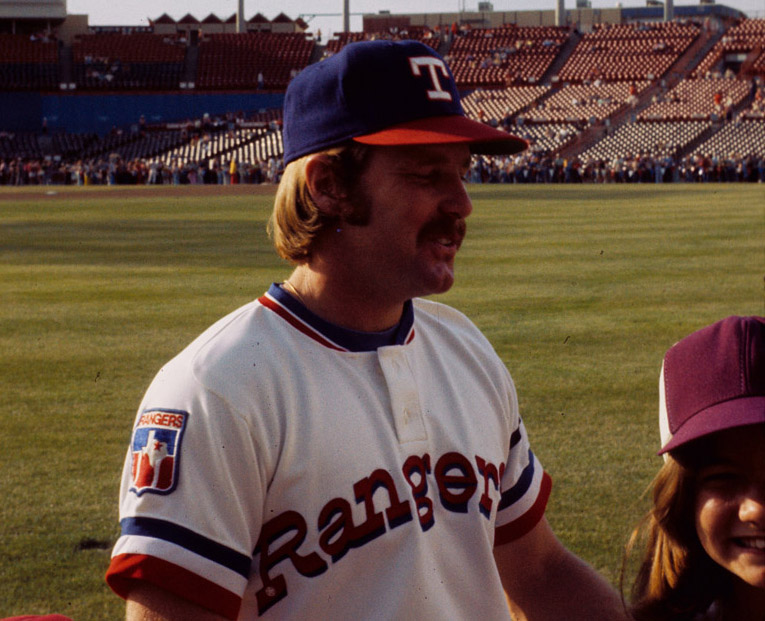
- Harrah in 1977
- Third baseman / Shortstop
- Born: October 26, 1948 (age 77); Sissonville, West Virginia, U.S.
- Batted: Right Threw: Right

MLB debut
- September 5, 1969, for the Washington Senators

Last MLB appearance
- October 4, 1986, for the Texas Rangers

MLB statistics
- Batting average: .264
- Home runs: 195
- Runs batted in: 918
- Stats at Baseball Reference

Teams
- As player: Washington Senators / Texas Rangers (1969, 1971–1978); Cleveland Indians (1979–1983); New York Yankees (1984); Texas Rangers (1985–1986); As manager: Texas Rangers (1992); As coach: Texas Rangers (1989–1992); Cleveland Indians (1996); Detroit Tigers (1998); Colorado Rockies (2000–2002); Detroit Tigers (2013)

Career highlights and awards
- 4× All-Star (1972, 1975, 1976, 1982); Texas Rangers Hall of Fame

Colbert Dale "Toby" Harrah (born October 26, 1948) is an American former professional baseball shortstop and third baseman. He played in Major League Baseball from 1969 to 1986. Harrah played the majority of his career for the Texas Rangers franchise, including his rookie season during the team's final year as the Washington Senators in 1971. He also played for the Cleveland Indians and the New York Yankees. In 1992, he briefly served as manager of the Rangers. Harrah most recently served as the assistant hitting coach for the Detroit Tigers.

== Playing career ==
Harrah was scouted as a high school baseball player in his hometown of LaRue, Ohio, but was not signed at graduation as most scouts expected him to attend college on a baseball scholarship. Legendary scout Tony Lucadello later discovered that Harrah was not attending school, but was instead working in a factory in nearby Marion. Lucadello signed Harrah for the Philadelphia Phillies in December 1966.

After one year in the Phillies organization, Harrah was drafted by the Washington Senators in the fall of 1967. After a brief callup in 1969, he advanced to the major league club in 1971; the next year the franchise relocated and became the Texas Rangers. He was the regular shortstop through 1976, then moved to third base, although he still saw some action at short. He was selected to the American League All-Star team in 1972, 1975, and 1976. He had a career-best 93 RBIs in 1975. On June 25, 1976, Harrah played an entire doubleheader at shortstop without recording a single chance in the field. The following season he and teammate Bump Wills hit back-to-back inside-the-park home runs.

In 1978, Harrah was traded to the Cleveland Indians for Buddy Bell, a player thought to be fairly similar in many respects. He was the Indians' regular third baseman through 1983 and made the All-Star team in 1982. That year he had 100 runs and a career-best .304 batting average.

In 1984, Harrah was traded to the New York Yankees, where he was a part-time player, then he was traded again to the Rangers, where he played regularly again for the 1985 and 1986 seasons, primarily at second base. With the retirement of Jeff Burroughs in 1985, Harrah became the last active major leaguer to have played for the Washington Senators. He was also the last player to see a pitch for the Senators in their final game on September 30, 1971, when Tommy McCraw was caught stealing during his plate appearance for the Senators' final out in the bottom of the eighth.

In a 13–11 Rangers win over the Baltimore Orioles at Memorial Stadium on August 6, 1986 which was the first game in MLB history that featured three grand slams, Harrah hit the first one of the contest off Ken Dixon in the second inning. Larry Sheets and Jim Dwyer hit the other two in the fourth off Bobby Witt and Jeff Russell respectively.

Harrah was noted for his good eye at the plate, placing in the top ten in the league for bases on balls on nine occasions, including an AL-best 109 in 1977. He finished his career with more bases on balls than strikeouts, with 1153 and 868, respectively. He also had better than average power for a defensive infielder, hitting 195 career home runs. Combined with good speed, he accumulated three seasons of 20 home runs and 20 stolen bases. Harrah's on-base skills and respectable slugging ability led to a solid career Adjusted OPS of 114.

According to sabermetrician Jay Jaffe of Baseball Prospectus, Harrah is the 25th-best third baseman in Major League Baseball history, outpacing several Hall of Famers. Despite his superior statistical accomplishments, Harrah only received a single vote for the Baseball Hall of Fame in 1992, thereby removing his name from future ballots. Harrah's chances for the Hall were seemingly hurt by his multiple position switches: from shortstop, to third base, to second base, and often back and forth. He did not match the awards or "counting stats" (avg, HR, RBI) of well-hitting contemporary shortstops like Cal Ripken Jr. and Barry Larkin, or third baseman such as Wade Boggs or George Brett, all of whom were on their way to HOF careers by the time Harrah was eligible in 1992. Contemporary baseball historians have placed more value on Harrah's career after the fact, noting that he was a solid all-around player who placed among the league leaders in Wins Above Replacement on 5 occasions.

In 2009, Harrah was named to the Texas Rangers Hall of Fame.

== Coaching career ==
Following his playing career, Harrah moved on to coaching in professional baseball. From 1987 to 1988 he managed the Triple A Oklahoma City 89ers. From 1989 to 1991 he served as the first base coach for the Texas Rangers under manager Bobby Valentine. In 1992 he shifted to bench coach under Valentine then replaced him as manager with 76 games left to go in the season. As interim manager, the Rangers under Harrah went 32–44.

In 1995 Harrah managed the Triple A Norfolk Tides to an 86–56 record, finishing in first place in the International League East Division. In 1996 he served as the third base coach for the Cleveland Indians under Mike Hargrove, replacing Buddy Bell, who had been named manager of the Detroit Tigers. In 1997, he served as a minor league hitting coach within the Tigers organization. In 1998 he joined the Tigers major league club as hitting coach, serving under manager Bell and interim manager Larry Parrish, both teammates of Harrah with the Rangers in the mid 1980s. When Bell was hired as the manager of the Colorado Rockies in 2000, Harrah joined him once again by serving as bench coach through the 2002 season.

In 2004, Harrah was named minor league hitting coordinator for the Tigers, where he worked with players at all levels as a roving instructor. He remained in that position until part way through the 2012 season.

In June 2012, Harrah joined the Detroit Tigers major league coaching staff in an unofficial capacity. Tigers manager Jim Leyland noted that with so many players struggling at once, hitting coach Lloyd McClendon had been stretched thin. The notion of two hitting coaches had been recommended to Leyland by friend and former colleague Tony La Russa. LaRussa had been the first to adopt a two-coach system when he named an assistant hitting coach, (Mike Aldrete), with the St. Louis Cardinals in 2008. In the month following Harrah's arrival, the Tigers offense increased their average runs per game from 4.3 to 5.6.

Following the 2012 season, Harrah was officially named assistant hitting coach by the Tigers for the 2013 season. Following the 2013 season and the retirement of Tigers manager Jim Leyland, Harrah was informed that his contract would not be renewed.

== See also ==
- List of Major League Baseball career runs scored leaders

Preceded by Larry Herndon	Detroit Tigers Hitting coach 1998	Succeeded by Alan Trammell
Preceded by Bruce Kimm	Colorado Rockies Bench coach 2000–2002	Succeeded by Jamie Quirk
