= 1984 Southern League season =

- League: Southern League
- Sport: Baseball
- Duration: April 9 – September 3
- Number of games: 148
- Number of teams: 10

Regular season
- League champions: Greenville Braves
- Season MVP: Andrés Galarraga, Jacksonville Suns

Playoffs
- League champions: Charlotte Orioles
- Runners-up: Knoxville Blue Jays

SL seasons
- ← 1983 1985 →

The 1984 Southern League was a Class AA baseball season played between April 9 and September 3. Ten teams played a 148-game schedule, with the top team in each division in each half of the season qualifying for the post-season.

The Charlotte Orioles won the Southern League championship, as they defeated the Knoxville Blue Jays in the playoffs.

== Team changes ==
- The Savannah Braves relocated to Greenville, South Carolina and were renamed to the Greenville Braves. The club remained affiliated with the Atlanta Braves.
- The Jacksonville Suns ended their affiliation with the Kansas City Royals and began a new affiliation with the Montreal Expos.
- The Memphis Chicks ended their affiliation with the Montreal Expos and began a new affiliation with the Kansas City Royals.

== Teams ==
1984 Southern League
| Division | Team | City | MLB Affiliate | Stadium |
| East | Charlotte Orioles | Charlotte, North Carolina | Baltimore Orioles | Jim Crockett Memorial Park |
| East | Columbus Astros | Columbus, Georgia | Houston Astros | Golden Park |
| East | Greenville Braves | Greenville, South Carolina | Atlanta Braves | Greenville Municipal Stadium |
| East | Jacksonville Suns | Jacksonville, Florida | Montreal Expos | Wolfson Park |
| East | Orlando Twins | Orlando, Florida | Minnesota Twins | Tinker Field |
| West | Birmingham Barons | Birmingham, Alabama | Detroit Tigers | Rickwood Field |
| West | Chattanooga Lookouts | Chattanooga, Tennessee | Seattle Mariners | Engel Stadium |
| West | Knoxville Blue Jays | Knoxville, Tennessee | Toronto Blue Jays | Bill Meyer Stadium |
| West | Memphis Chicks | Memphis, Tennessee | Kansas City Royals | Tim McCarver Stadium |
| West | Nashville Sounds | Nashville, Tennessee | New York Yankees | Herschel Greer Stadium |

== Map of teams ==
East Division West Division

== Regular season ==
=== Summary ===
- The Greenville Braves finished the season with the best record in the league for the first time in team history.

=== Standings ===
East Division
| Team | Win | Loss | % | GB |
|---|---|---|---|---|
| Greenville Braves | 80 | 61 | .567 | – |
| Orlando Twins | 79 | 65 | .549 | 2.5 |
| Jacksonville Suns | 76 | 69 | .524 | 6 |
| Charlotte Orioles | 75 | 72 | .510 | 8 |
| Columbus Astros | 69 | 71 | .493 | 10.5 |
West Division
| Nashville Sounds | 74 | 73 | .503 | – |
| Memphis Chicks | 71 | 75 | .486 | 2.5 |
| Knoxville Blue Jays | 70 | 75 | .483 | 3 |
| Birmingham Barons | 66 | 81 | .449 | 8 |
| Chattanooga Lookouts | 63 | 81 | .438 | 9.5 |

== League Leaders ==
=== Batting leaders ===
| Stat | Player | Total |
|---|---|---|
| AVG | Doc Estes, Greenville Braves | .341 |
| H | Doc Estes, Greenville Braves | 174 |
| R | Mike Cole, Greenville Braves | 105 |
| 2B | Steve Curry, Greenville Braves | 32 |
| 3B | Greg Howe, Orlando Twins | 14 |
| HR | Dan Pasqua, Nashville Sounds | 33 |
| RBI | Stan Holmes, Orlando Twins | 101 |
| SB | Donell Nixon, Chattanooga Lookouts | 102 |

=== Pitching leaders ===
| Stat | Player | Total |
|---|---|---|
| W | Ken Dixon, Charlotte Orioles; Bryan Oelkers, Orlando Twins | 16 |
| ERA | Bob Tewksbury, Nashville Sounds | 2.83 |
| CG | Ken Dixon, Charlotte Orioles | 20 |
| SHO | Bryan Oelkers, Orlando Twins | 4 |
| SV | Randy Graham, Nashville Sounds; Nate Snell, Charlotte Orioles; Curt Wardle, Orlando Twins | 17 |
| IP | Ken Dixon, Charlotte Orioles | 240.0 |
| SO | Ken Dixon, Charlotte Orioles | 211 |

== Playoffs ==
- The Charlotte Orioles won their second Southern League championship, defeating the Knoxville Blue Jays in three games.

=== Playoff bracket ===
Division finals
E1 | Greenville | 1
E2 | Charlotte | 3
W1 | Nashville | 1
W2 | Knoxville | 3

Finals
E2 | Charlotte | 3
W2 | Knoxville | 0

== Awards ==
Southern League awards
| Award name | Recipient |
|---|---|
| Most Valuable Player | Andrés Galarraga, Jacksonville Suns |
| Pitcher of the Year | Ken Dixon, Charlotte Orioles |
| Manager of the Year | Charlie Manuel, Orlando Twins; Rick Renick, Jacksonville Suns |

== See also ==
- 1984 Major League Baseball season
