= Luis A. Canena Marquez Stadium =

Baseball stadium located in Aguadilla, Puerto Rico

- "Canena Marquez"
- Interactive map of Luis A. Canena Marquez Stadium
- Location: Off I-PR-2; Aguadilla, PR 00604
- Coordinates: 18°26′14″N 067°08′47″W
- Owner: City of Aguadilla
- Operator: City of Aguadilla
- Capacity: 5,000+
- Surface: Grass
- Field size: Left Field – 330 ft (100.6 m); Deep Left-Center – 360 ft (109.7 m); Center Field – 405 ft (123.4 m); Deep Right-Center – 375 ft (114.3 m); Right Field – 335 ft (102.1 m); Backstop – 30 ft (9.1 m)

Construction
- Opened: 1981

Tenants
- Aguadilla Sharks (Professional Baseball League) (2016-present); Aguadilla Sharks (Superior Baseball League/AA) (1965-present)

Luis A. Canena Marquez Stadium is a baseball stadium located in Aguadilla, Puerto Rico. It is the home to the Aguadilla Sharks (Tiburones de Aguadilla) of the Professional Baseball League that plays from mid-October to early January and the Double-A Superior Baseball League that plays from mid-February to late-April/early May.

The stadium was built under the municipal administration of Alfredo Gonzalez in 1981 to substitute for the old Columbus Field located in Columbus Park in Downtown Aguadilla. The new stadium was to be located next to Las Cascadas Water Park. It has a capacity of 5,000 spectators. Also houses the city Civil Defense offices and the Aguadilla EMS System in the stadium.

A bronze statue of Luis A. Canena Marquez is located in front of the stadium.

== Role in the Central American and Caribbean Games Mayagüez 2010 ==
The Stadium was remodeled to be the temporary home for the Mayagüez Indians of the Puerto Rican Professional Baseball League in November 2007 as a result of their current home, the Isidoro García Baseball Stadium, being demolished to make way for the construction of a new stadium for the 2010 Central American and Caribbean Games. During the Mayagüez 2010 games the stadium will also host baseball games.

== Other uses ==
Besides baseball, the stadium has also hosted Christian concerts, religious gatherings, high school graduation ceremonies, and Little League Baseball games and inaugurations.
