= Heinkel (surname) =

Heinkel is a German language surname. It stems from a reduced form of the male given name Heinrich – and may refer to:

- Don Heinkel (1959), retired Major League Baseball pitcher
- Ernst Heinkel (1888–1958), German aircraft designer
