= 1992 Caribbean Series =

1992 baseball tournament

The thirty-fourth edition of the Caribbean Series (Serie del Caribe) was played in 1992. It was held from February 2 through February 9 with the champions teams from the Dominican Republic, Leones del Escogido; Mexico, Naranjeros de Hermosillo; Puerto Rico, Indios de Mayagüez, and Venezuela, Águilas del Zulia. The format consisted of 12 games, each team facing the other teams twice, and was played at Héctor Espino Baseball Stadium in Hermosillo, Mexico.

== Final standings ==
Country	Club	W	L	W/L %	Managers
Puerto Rico (*)	Indios de Mayagüez	5	2	.714	Pat Kelly
Venezuela	Águilas del Zulia	4	3	.571	Pompeyo Davalillo
Mexico	Naranjeros de Hermosillo	3	3	.500	Tim Johnson
Dominican Republic	Leones del Escogido	1	5	.167	Felipe Alou
* Won the championship game

== Individual leaders ==
Player	Statistic
Batting
Chad Kreuter (PUR)	Batting average	.391
Eric Fox (PUR)	Runs	8
Chad Kreuter (PUR)	Hits	9
Chad Kreuter (PUR)	Home runs	3
Héctor Villanueva (PUR)	RBI	9
Pitching
Thirteen pitchers tied	Wins	1
Wilson Álvarez (VEN)	Strikeouts	19
Wilson Álvarez (VEN)	ERA	1.80
Wilson Álvarez (VEN)	Innings pitched	15.0

== All-Star Team ==
Name	Position
Chad Kreuter (PUR)	Catcher
Henry Rodríguez (DOM)	First baseman
Johnny Paredes (VEN)	Second baseman
Pedro Castellano (VEN)	Third baseman
José Luis Sandoval (MEX)	Shortstop
Chad Curtis (VEN)	Left fielder
Al Martin (MEX)	Center fielder
Alonso Tellez (MEX)	Right fielder
Jim Wilson (MEX)	Designated hitter
Shawn Boskie (DOM)	Right-handed pitcher
Wilson Álvarez (VEN)	Left-handed pitcher
Awards
Chad Kreuter (PUR)	Most Valuable Player
Pat Kelly (PUR)	Manager

== See also ==
- Ballplayers who have played in the Series

== Sources ==
- Nuñez, José Antero (1994). Serie del Caribe de la Habana a Puerto La Cruz. JAN Editor. ISBN 980-07-2389-7
