= Baseball at the 2010 Central American and Caribbean Games =

Tournament details
- Country: Puerto Rico
- Dates: 20–28 July
- Teams: 9
- Defending champions: Cuba

Final positions
- Champions: Dominican Republic (3rd title)
- Runners-up: Mexico
- Third place: Nicaragua
- Fourth place: Puerto Rico

Tournament statistics
- Games played: 22
- Attendance: 37,103 (1,687 per game)
- Best BA: (Mexico) Humberto Sosa (.692)
- Most HRs: (Panama) Carlos Quiroz (2)
- Most SBs: (Dominican Republic) Bernie Castro (5)
- Best ERA: (Mexico) Carlos Elizalde (0.00)
- Most Ks (as pitcher): (Panama) Alberto Acosta (12)

The baseball competition at the 2010 Central American and Caribbean Games was held in Mayagüez, Puerto Rico from July 20–28, 2010.

== Medalists ==
Gold	Silver	Bronze
Dominican Republic	Mexico	Nicaragua
Leocadio Batista; José Cabrera; Napoleón Calzado; José Campusano; Bernie Castro; José de los Santos; Ángel Fermin; Garibardi German; Alexis Gómez; Habelito Hernández; Willy Lebron; Victor Méndez; Víctor Moreno; Ricardo Nanita; Roberto Novoa; Johanny Peña; Juan Peña; Santiago Ramírez; Nerio Rodríguez; Danilo Sánchez; Darío Veras	Ivan Araujo; Leobardo Arauz; Lorenzo Buelna; Francisco Campos; Jesús Castillo; Domingo Castro; Carloes Elizalde; Efrén Espinoza; Sergio Omar Gastélum; Santiago González; Jorge Guzman; Cupertino León; Luis Nieblas; Juan Quintanilla; Angel Ramírez; Alfonso Sánchez; Humberto Sosa; Marco Tovar; Emmanuel Valdez; Francisco Villegas	Berman Espinoza; Diego García; Ronald Garth; Jimmy González; Sandor Guido; Armado Hernández; Mario Holmann; Mark Joseph; Edgar López; Roger Marin; Adolfo Matamoros; Janior Montes; Douglas Morales; Mario Peña; Jairo Pineda; Esteban Ramírez; Juli Raúdez; Justo Rivas; Juan Urbina

== Preliminaries ==
=== Pool A ===
==== Standings ====
Teams	W	L	Pct.	GB	R	RA
Puerto Rico	4	0	1.000	—	24	2
Venezuela	3	1	.750	1	35	4
Panama	2	2	.500	2	17	8
Guatemala	1	3	.250	3	7	50
U.S. Virgin Islands	0	4	.000	4	6	25

==== Schedule ====
July 20, 2010	Puerto Rico	9 – 0 (F/7)	Guatemala	Isidoro García Stadium, Mayagüez; Attendance: 5,500
July 20, 2010		Boxscore		Isidoro García Stadium, Mayagüez; Attendance: 5,500

July 21, 2010	Panama	1 – 0	U.S. Virgin Islands	Isidoro García Stadium, Mayagüez; Attendance: 300
July 21, 2010		Boxscore		Isidoro García Stadium, Mayagüez; Attendance: 300

July 21, 2010	Puerto Rico	3 – 2 (F/10)	Venezuela	Isidoro García Stadium, Mayagüez; Attendance: 10,500
July 21, 2010		Boxscore		Isidoro García Stadium, Mayagüez; Attendance: 10,500

July 22, 2010	Guatemala	7 – 6 (F/11)	U.S. Virgin Islands	Isidoro García Stadium, Mayagüez; Attendance: 50
July 22, 2010		Boxscore		Isidoro García Stadium, Mayagüez; Attendance: 50

July 22, 2010	Panama	0 – 6	Puerto Rico	Isidoro García Stadium, Mayagüez; Attendance: 3,000
July 22, 2010		Boxscore		Isidoro García Stadium, Mayagüez; Attendance: 3,000

July 23, 2010	Venezuela	20 – 0 (F/7)	Guatemala	Isidoro García Stadium, Mayagüez; Attendance: 50
July 23, 2010		Boxscore		Isidoro García Stadium, Mayagüez; Attendance: 50

July 24, 2010	Venezuela	2 – 1 (F/10)	Panama	Isidoro García Stadium, Mayagüez; Attendance: 50
July 24, 2010		Boxscore		Isidoro García Stadium, Mayagüez; Attendance: 50

July 24, 2010	Guatemala	0 – 15 (F/7)	Panama	Isidoro García Stadium, Mayagüez; Attendance: 262
July 24, 2010		Boxscore		Isidoro García Stadium, Mayagüez; Attendance: 262

July 24, 2010	U.S. Virgin Islands	0 – 11 (F/8)	Venezuela	Isidoro García Stadium, Mayagüez; Attendance: 51
July 24, 2010		Boxscore		Isidoro García Stadium, Mayagüez; Attendance: 51

July 25, 2010	U.S. Virgin Islands	0 – 6	Puerto Rico	Luis A. Canena Marquez Stadium, Aguadilla; Attendance: 2,500
July 25, 2010		Boxscore		Luis A. Canena Marquez Stadium, Aguadilla; Attendance: 2,500

=== Pool B ===
==== Standings ====
Teams	W	L	Pct.	GB	R	RA
Dominican Republic	2	1	.667	—	19	5
Mexico	2	1	.667	—	7	8
Nicaragua	2	1	.667	—	12	12
Netherlands Antilles	0	3	.000	2	4	17

==== Schedule ====
July 21, 2010	Nicaragua	1 – 10	Dominican Republic	Isidoro García Stadium, Mayagüez; Attendance: 600

July 23, 2010	Netherlands Antilles	0 – 6	Nicaragua	Luis A. Canena Marquez Stadium, Aguadilla; Attendance: 200

July 24, 2010	Mexico	2 – 5	Nicaragua	Luis A. Canena Marquez Stadium, Aguadilla; Attendance: 0

July 24, 2010	Netherlands Antilles	2 – 8	Dominican Republic	Luis A. Canena Marquez Stadium, Aguadilla; Attendance: 0

July 25, 2010	Mexico	3 – 2	Netherlands Antilles	Isidoro García Stadium, Mayagüez; Attendance: 40

July 25, 2010	Dominican Republic	1 – 2	Mexico	Isidoro García Stadium, Mayagüez; Attendance: 700

== Final round ==
Playoffs
A2	Venezuela	0
B3	Nicaragua	2
B2	Mexico	7
A3	Panama	0

Semi-finals
B1	Dominican Republic	6
WP2	Nicaragua	5
A1	Puerto Rico	0
WP1	Mexico	1

Finals
WSF2	Mexico	2
WSF1	Dominican Republic	3
Third place
LSF2	Puerto Rico	6
LSF1	Nicaragua	7

=== Playoffs ===
July 26, 2010	Venezuela	0 – 2	Nicaragua	Isidoro García Stadium, Mayagüez; Attendance: 200

July 26, 2010	Mexico	7 – 0	Panama	Isidoro García Stadium, Mayagüez; Attendance: 300

=== Semifinals ===
July 27, 2010	Dominican Republic	6 – 5	Nicaragua	Isidoro García Stadium, Mayagüez; Attendance: 800

July 27, 2010	Puerto Rico	0 – 1	Mexico	Isidoro García Stadium, Mayagüez; Attendance: 6,000

=== Bronze medal game ===
July 28, 2010	Puerto Rico	6 – 7	Nicaragua	Isidoro García Stadium, Mayagüez; Attendance: 3,500

=== Final ===
July 28, 2010	Mexico	2 – 3	Dominican Republic	Isidoro García Stadium, Mayagüez; Attendance: 2,500

== Final standings ==
Rk	Team	W	L
1st place, gold medalist(s)	Dominican Republic	4	1
Lost in Final
2nd place, silver medalist(s)	Mexico	4	2
Lost in Semifinals
3rd place, bronze medalist(s)	Nicaragua	4	2
Lost in bronze medal game
4	Puerto Rico	4	2
Failed to qualify for Semifinals
5	Venezuela	3	2
6	Panama	2	3
Failed to qualify for the Playoffs
7	Guatemala	1	3
8	Netherlands Antilles	0	3
9	U.S. Virgin Islands	0	4
