= Artie Wilson =

American baseball player (1920-2010)

- Infielder
- Born: October 28, 1920; Springville, Alabama, U.S.
- Died: October 31, 2010 (aged 90); Portland, Oregon, U.S.
- Batted: Left Threw: Right

Professional debut
- NgL: 1942, for the Birmingham Black Barons
- MLB: April 18, 1951, for the New York Giants

Last MLB appearance
- May 23, 1951, for the New York Giants

MLB statistics
- Batting average: .366
- Hits: 177
- Home runs: 0
- Runs batted in: 48
- Stolen bases: 17
- Stats at Baseball Reference

Teams
- Birmingham Black Barons (1944–1948); New York Giants (1951)

Career highlights and awards
- 7× NgL All-Star (1944, 1946–1948); Negro American League batting champion (1948)

Arthur Lee Wilson (October 28, 1920 – October 31, 2010) was an American professional baseball player. He was an all-star for the Birmingham Black Barons of Negro league baseball before playing part of one season in Major League Baseball for the New York Giants in 1951. He was born in Springville, Alabama. Wilson is recognized as the last player in a recognized Major League to hit .400 in a season, having batted .435 (some records say .437, some .433) in 1948.

== Negro leagues and Puerto Rico League ==
Wilson played for the Birmingham Black Barons of the Negro American League from 1942 to 1948, where he was considered the league's best shortstop, and was named the starting shortstop of the league All-Star team seven times from 1944 to 1948 (missing out only in 1945, when he was beaten out by Jackie Robinson, shortly before the latter broke the baseball color line in 1947). During Wilson's time with the Black Barons, the team won the league championship in 1943, 1944 and 1948, advancing to, but never winning, the Negro League World Series.

In the 1948 regular season, Wilson, who was known as an opposite field hitter, batted .437, which resulted in his winning the NAL batting title. Not only was it the last NAL season with a recognized batting title, it also meant that Wilson was the ninth and final player in the Negro league baseball era to win multiple league batting titles. In 1948, Wilson mentored a young Willie Mays, who was just breaking into baseball.

Following the 1948 Negro World Series, Wilson played for the Mayagüez Indians of the Puerto Rican Professional Baseball League, leading them to their first championship title in 1949. Wilson is credited for giving future Puerto Rican comedic actor Shorty Castro his nickname while playing in Mayagüez.

== Pacific Coast League ==
In 1948, the New York Yankees purchased Wilson's contract, and he was assigned to their Newark Bears minor league team; but since his salary would have been less than he was making with Birmingham, he negotiated another contract with the San Diego Padres of the Pacific Coast League. The Yankees protested to baseball commissioner Happy Chandler, who voided Wilson's Padres contract. The Yankees then sold Wilson to the Oakland Oaks of the Pacific Coast League, where he was the team's first black player and the roommate of Billy Martin. With Oakland, Wilson won the PCL batting title with a .348 average and also led in stolen bases with 47. In 1950, he led the PCL in runs with 168 and hits with 264, helping the Oaks to the 1950 PCL championship.

== Major leagues ==
Wilson's accomplishments were noticed by the New York Giants, and he was called up for the 1951 season, where he was used as a utility infielder and as a pinch runner and pinch hitter. But Wilson struggled in the big leagues, hitting only .182 in 22 at bats; when the Giants called up Wilson's former protégé Willie Mays, they sent Wilson back to Oakland, ending his major league career. Back in the PCL, Wilson finished the 1951 season with the Oaks and was sold to the Seattle Rainiers in 1952. Wilson also played with the Portland Beavers and Sacramento Solons of the PCL, winning three more PCL batting titles before leaving baseball in 1957. His career ultimately ended with a short comeback for the Beavers in 1962.

== Personal life ==
Wilson settled in Portland, Oregon, in 1955, and with his wife, Dorothy, raised two children. Following his retirement from baseball, he worked at Gary Worth Lincoln Mercury in Portland for more than 30 years, and stayed on there until the fall of 2008 at the age of 88 still greeting customers. He was named to the Oregon Sports Hall of Fame in 1989, and the PCL Hall of Fame in 2003.

Wilson died in Portland, Oregon on October 31, 2010, three days after celebrating his 90th birthday. He had been suffering from Alzheimer's disease.

== See also ==
- List of Negro league baseball players who played in Major League Baseball
