= Pat Kelly (catcher) =

American baseball player & coach (born 1955)

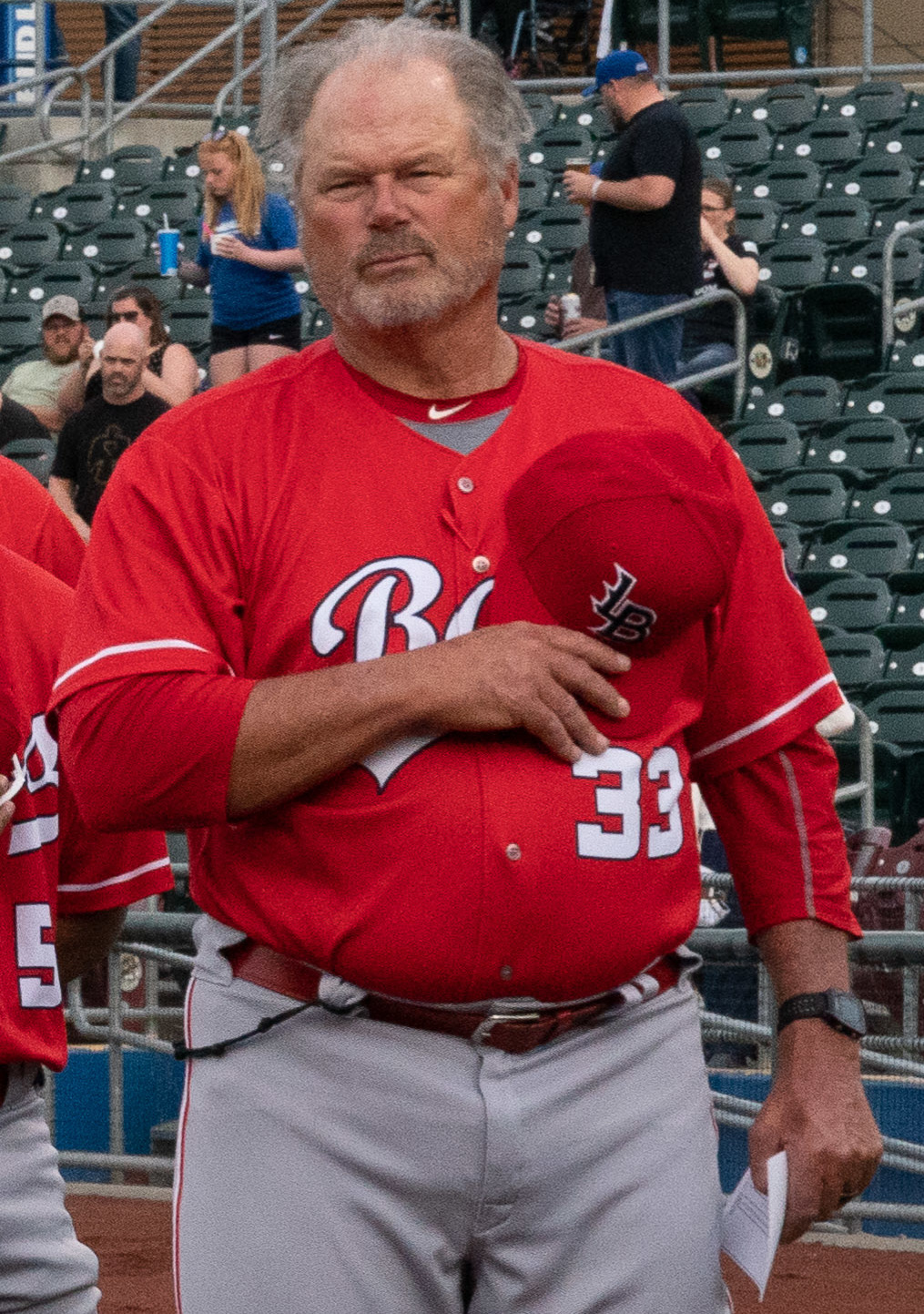
- Kelly with the Louisville Bats in 2022
- Catcher / Coach
- Born: August 27, 1955 (age 70); Santa Maria, California, U.S.
- Batted: Right Threw: Right

MLB debut
- May 28, 1980, for the Toronto Blue Jays

Last MLB appearance
- June 3, 1980, for the Toronto Blue Jays

MLB statistics
- Batting average: .286
- Home runs: 0
- Runs batted in: 0
- Stats at Baseball Reference

Teams
- As player: Toronto Blue Jays (1980); As coach: Cincinnati Reds (2007, 2018)

Dale Patrick Kelly (born August 27, 1955) is an American former professional baseball catcher and current coach. He played in Major League Baseball (MLB) for the Toronto Blue Jays.

== Career ==
Drafted in the third round of 1973 amateur draft, his career in the majors consisted of three games. Kelly made his MLB debut with the Toronto Blue Jays on May 28, 1980, and played his final game six days later. In seven at-bats, he had two hits, for a .286 batting average, with no home runs or RBIs. Kelly batted and threw right-handed.

On July 3, 2007, Kelly replaced Bucky Dent as the Cincinnati Reds bench coach on an interim basis.

On June 5, 2008, Kelly's son Casey was the 30th selection of the first round, by the Boston Red Sox in the MLB's First Year Player Draft. Pat's older son, Chris, played in the Tampa Bay Rays farm system.

In January 2014, Kelly replaced Ken Griffey Sr. as the manager of the Reds' Single High-Class A California League affiliate in Bakersfield, California. Kelly had managed the Reds' Rookie League team in Billings, Montana in 2013.

In December 2014, Kelly was named manager of the Reds' Double-A affiliate, the Pensacola Blue Wahoos. On April 18, 2018, Kelly once again became the interim bench coach for the Reds.

In January 2019, Kelly was named manager of the Reds' Double-A affiliate, the Chattanooga Lookouts. He was named the manager of the Louisville Bats prior to the 2020 season.

On July 11, 2024, Kelly earned his 2,000th win in his 35th season as a Minor League Baseball manager. He is the seventh manager to reach the feat.

=== Winter ball ===
In between, Kelly played winter ball with the Cardenales de Lara club of the Venezuelan League in the 1977–1978 season, and also managed the Indios de Mayagüez of Puerto Rico to the 1992 Caribbean Series championship title. He also played for the Bradenton Explorers of the Senior Professional Baseball Association in its 1989 inaugural season.
