= Kevin Reese =

American baseball player (born 1978)

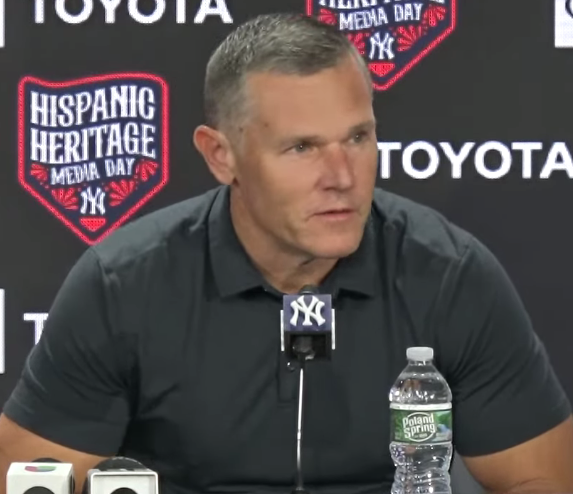
- Reese in 2024
- Outfielder
- Born: March 11, 1978 (age 48); San Diego, California, U.S.
- Batted: Left Threw: Left

MLB debut
- June 26, 2005, for the New York Yankees

Last MLB appearance
- July 4, 2006, for the New York Yankees

MLB statistics
- Batting average: .385
- Hits: 9
- Runs batted in: 1
- Stats at Baseball Reference

Teams
- New York Yankees (2005–2006)

Kevin Patrick Reese (born March 11, 1978) is an American professional baseball outfielder who played in Major League Baseball for the New York Yankees in 2005 and 2006. After retiring as a player, the Yankees hired him as a scout. Reese is the director of player development for the Yankees.

== Amateur career ==
A native of San Diego, California, Reese graduated from Mission Bay High School. He attended the University of San Diego, where he played college baseball for the Toreros from 1997-2000. In 1999, he played collegiate summer baseball with the Chatham A's of the Cape Cod Baseball League. He tore a ligament in his thumb in 2000.

== Professional career ==
The San Diego Padres selected Reese in the 27th round of the 2000 MLB draft. The Padres traded Reese to the New York Yankees for Bernie Castro after the 2001 season. After spending several seasons in the minor leagues, Reese was called up to the Yankees on June 26, 2005, due to an injury to outfielder Hideki Matsui. In his first major league plate appearance, which came against the New York Mets, Reese drew a walk. In his first official major league at-bat, Reese struck out. Later the same week, he was returned to the minor leagues by the team.

On May 12, 2006, Reese was recalled by the Yankees from the Columbus Clippers to serve as a backup outfielder after Matsui broke his wrist. He collected his first major league hit in a game against the Mets, on May 20, 2006. He spent all year with the Scranton/Wilkes Barre Yankees. Reese was designated for assignment on August 14, 2007. He was outrighted back to the Scranton/Wilkes Barre Yankees a day later.

== Scouting and front office career ==
After receiving no offers to attend major league spring training following the 2007 season, Reese retired from playing and accepted a job with the New York Yankees as a scout for the South Atlantic and the Carolina Leagues.

Reese was named senior director of player development of the New York Yankees on November 3, 2017, succeeding Gary Denbo. He was promoted to vice president of player development on January 12, 2022.
