= Bernie Castro =

Dominican baseball player (born 1979)

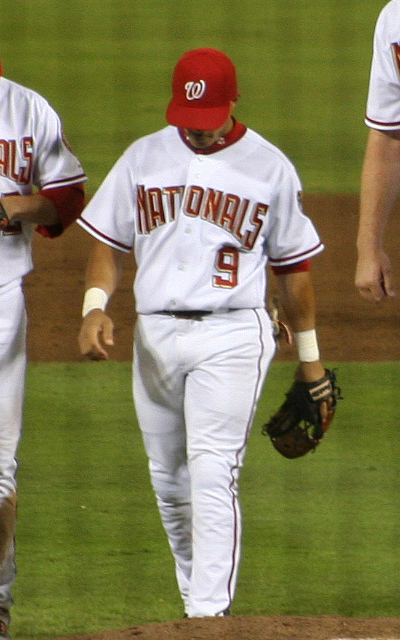
- Second baseman
- Born: July 14, 1979 (age 47); Santiago, Dominican Republic
- Batted: Switch Threw: Right

MLB debut
- September 1, 2005, for the Baltimore Orioles

Last MLB appearance
- October 1, 2006, for the Washington Nationals

MLB statistics
- Batting average: .253
- Hits: 48
- Runs batted in: 17
- Stats at Baseball Reference

Teams
- Baltimore Orioles (2005); Washington Nationals (2006)
Medals
Representing Dominican Republic
Men's Baseball
Central American and Caribbean Games
Gold medal – first place	2010 Mayagüez	Team

Bernabel "Bernie" Castro (born July 14, 1979) is a Dominican former Major League Baseball (MLB) second baseman. He played two major league seasons, one each with the Washington Nationals and Baltimore Orioles.

== Career ==
The New York Yankees signed Castro as an international free agent in 1997. After two seasons, the Yankees traded him to the San Diego Padres for outfielder Kevin Reese.

After becoming a free agent in the 2004 offseason, Castro signed a minor league deal with the Baltimore Orioles. Bernie Castro made his Major League Baseball debut with the Baltimore Orioles on September 1, 2005, against the Toronto Blue Jays. In that game, he recorded his first major league hit, an infield single off pitcher Dustin McGowan in the third inning. He also hit a triple and stole a base during the game, becoming the first player in MLB in 2005 to reach base safely in his first three plate appearances of his major league debut. Playing in 24 games for the major league team, hitting .288 with a .360 on-base percentage.

He again became a free agent after the 2005 season, and signed with the Washington Nationals. He played in 42 games for the Nationals during the 2006 season, accumulating 110 at-bats. Castro was granted free agency once more after the 2007 season, and signed a minor league contract with the Yankees. He again became a free agent after the 2008 season.

During the winter he played for his hometown Aguilas Cibaeñas in the Dominican Winter League.

After his playing career ended, Castro became a hitting coach for the Dominican Summer League Pirates for the 2016 season and with the Toros del Este in 2017.
