= Larry Sheets =

American baseball player (born 1959)

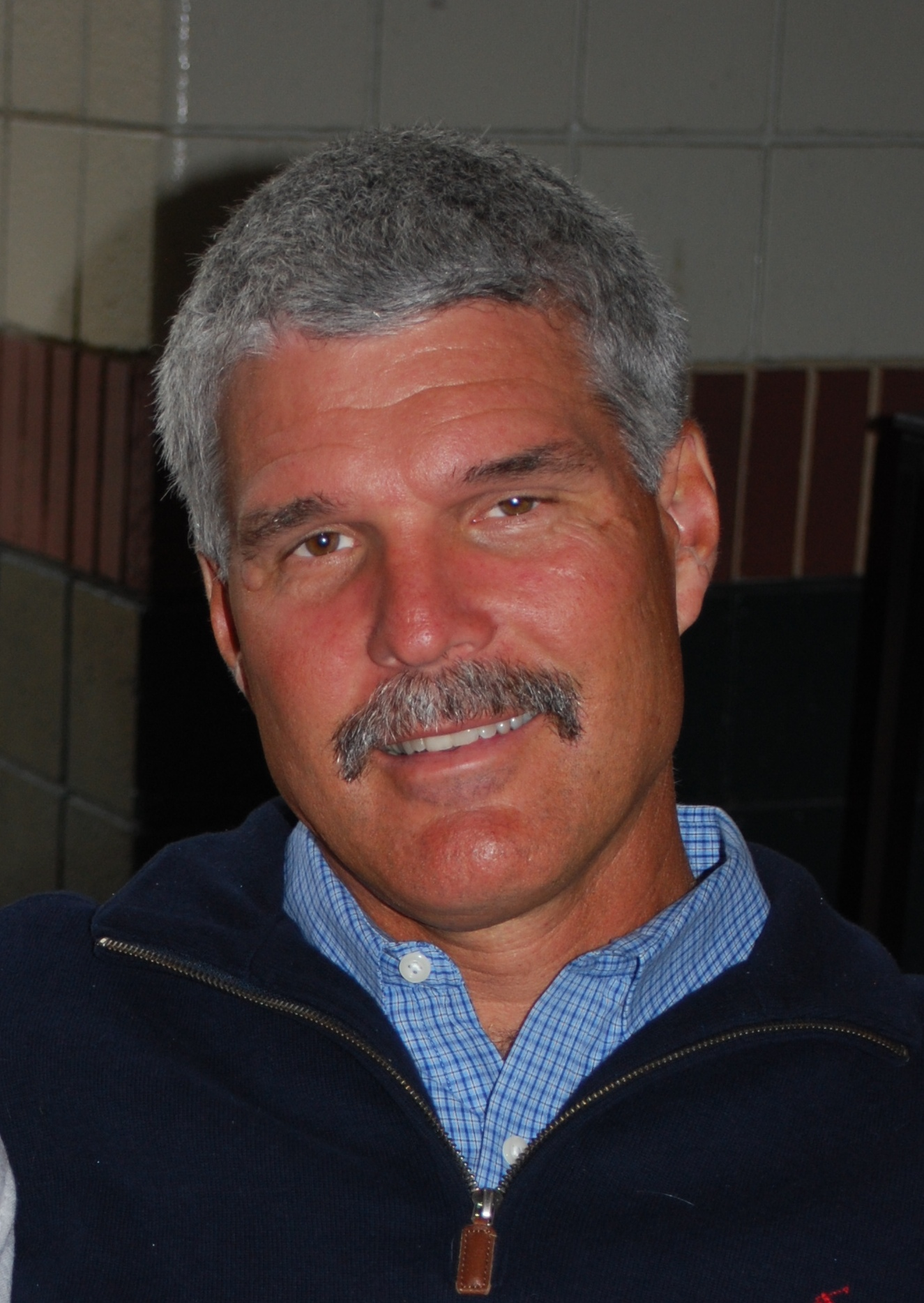
- Designated hitter / Outfielder
- Born: December 6, 1959 (age 66); Staunton, Virginia, U.S.
- Batted: Left Threw: Right

MLB debut
- September 18, 1984, for the Baltimore Orioles

Last MLB appearance
- October 1, 1993, for the Seattle Mariners

MLB statistics
- Batting average: .266
- Home runs: 94
- Runs batted in: 339

NPB statistics
- Batting average: .308
- Home runs: 26
- Runs batted in: 100
- Stats at Baseball Reference

Teams
- Baltimore Orioles (1984–1989); Detroit Tigers (1990); Yokohama Taiyo Whales (1992); Seattle Mariners (1993)

Larry Kent Sheets (born December 6, 1959) is an American former Major League Baseball (MLB) outfielder and designated hitter who played for the Baltimore Orioles, Detroit Tigers, and Seattle Mariners from 1984 to 1990 and 1993. He also played one season in Japan for the Yokohama Taiyo Whales in 1992.

== Career ==
Sheets attended Eastern Mennonite University, where he played basketball. He was named to the Old Dominion Athletic Conference's all-conference second team in 1980 and to the first team in 1982. He graduated from Eastern Mennonite in 1984. He was named to Eastern Mennonite's athletic hall of fame in 1988.

Sheets was selected as the first of the Orioles' four picks in the second round (29th overall) of the 1978 MLB draft, nineteen slots ahead of Cal Ripken Jr. His lack of enthusiasm and commitment to the sport while in the minors frustrated Orioles scouts and officials, as chronicled in an article written by Alexander Wolff in the June 15, 1981 issue of Sports Illustrated. In a 13–11 loss to the Texas Rangers at Memorial Stadium on August 6, 1986 which was the first-ever game in MLB history that featured three grand slams, Sheets and Jim Dwyer each hit one in the fourth inning, off Bobby Witt and Jeff Russell respectively. Toby Harrah had hit the first one of the contest off Ken Dixon two innings earlier.

Sheets had career highs in batting average (.316), home runs (31) and RBIs (94) in 1987.

After six seasons in Baltimore, Sheets was dealt to the Tigers for Mike Brumley, as the Orioles traded a much-needed power hitter for a younger, less expensive player.

== Personal life ==
Sheets operated a youth sports facility in Westminster, Maryland. He serves as Gilman School's head varsity baseball coach.

He has a son named Gavin, who plays for the San Diego Padres of Major League Baseball (MLB).
