= List of Major League Baseball players from the United States Virgin Islands =

This is a chronological list of baseball players from the United States Virgin Islands who played in Major League Baseball between 1957 and 2026

== Players ==
Name	Debut	Final game	Position	Teams	Ref
Valmy Thomas	April 16, 1957	October 1, 1961	Catcher	New York/San Francisco Giants, Philadelphia Phillies, Baltimore Orioles, Cleveland Indians	
Joe Christopher	May 26, 1959	June 9, 1966	Outfielder	Pittsburgh Pirates, New York Mets, Boston Red Sox	
Al McBean	July 2, 1961	May 10, 1970	Pitcher	Pittsburgh Pirates, San Diego Padres, Los Angeles Dodgers	
Elmo Plaskett	September 8, 1962	May 18, 1963	Catcher	Pittsburgh Pirates	
Horace Clarke	May 13, 1965	September 15, 1974	Second baseman	New York Yankees, San Diego Padres	
Elrod Hendricks	April 13, 1968	September 19, 1979	Catcher	Baltimore Orioles, Chicago Cubs, New York Yankees	
José Morales	August 13, 1973	June 4, 1984	First baseman\designated hitter	Oakland Athletics, Montreal Expos, Minnesota Twins, Baltimore Orioles, Los Angeles Dodgers	
Henry Cruz	April 18, 1975	July 30, 1978	Outfielder	Los Angeles Dodgers, Chicago White Sox	
Jerry Browne	September 6, 1986	October 1, 1995	Second baseman	Texas Rangers, Cleveland Indians, Oakland Athletics, Florida Marlins	
Midre Cummings	September 10, 1993	August 6, 2005	Outfielder	Pittsburgh Pirates, Philadelphia Phillies, Boston Red Sox, Minnesota Twins, Arizona Diamondbacks, Tampa Bay Devil Rays, Baltimore Orioles	
Calvin Pickering	September 12, 1998	April 25, 2005	First baseman\designated hitter	Baltimore Orioles, Cincinnati Reds, Boston Red Sox, Kansas City Royals	
Callix Crabbe	April 3, 2008	May 8, 2008	Second baseman	San Diego Padres	
Akeel Morris	June 17, 2015	Active	Pitcher	New York Mets, Atlanta Braves, Los Angeles Angels	
Jabari Blash	April 4, 2016	September 30, 2018	Outfielder	San Diego Padres, Los Angeles Angels	
Jharel Cotton	September 7, 2016	October 4, 2022	Pitcher	Oakland Athletics, Texas Rangers, Minnesota Twins, San Francisco Giants	
Alex McFarlane	July 22, 2026	Active	Pitcher	Philadelphia Phillies	

== Resource ==
- Baseball Reference
