= Isidoro García Stadium =

Baseball stadium in Mayagüez, Puerto Rico

Coordinates: 18°11′34.58″N 67°09′17.96″W

Estadio Isidoro García
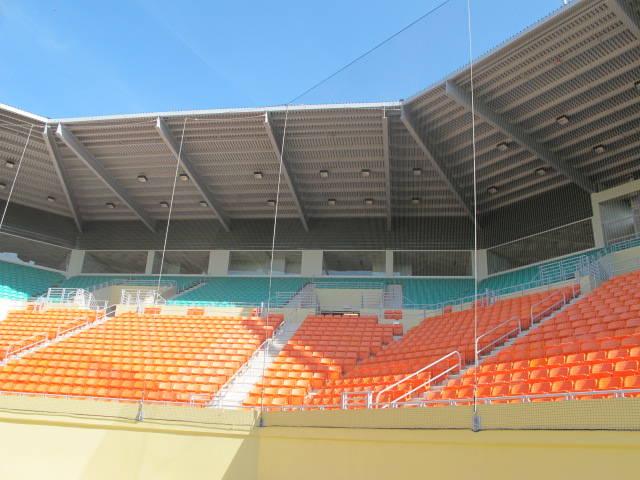
- Interactive map of Estadio Isidoro García
- Location: Avenida Colby William Duscombe, Mayagüez, Puerto Rico
- Capacity: 10,500

Construction
- Groundbreaking: January 11, 2008
- Opened: February 8, 2010
- Cost: $48.7 million

Tenants
- Indios de Mayagüez; 2010 Central American and Caribbean Games; 2011 Caribbean Series

Estadio Isidoro García is a baseball stadium in Mayagüez, named after Isidoro "El Cholo" García, a local pitcher who threw the first ever no-hitter at a final series game in the Puerto Rico Baseball League. The stadium is located south of the city, at road PR-63, also named the Avenida Colby William Dunscombe (named after a former medical director of the local Adventist Bella Vista Hospital). The site lies north of the Mayaguez Athletics Stadium (finished in December 2009) and across the street from the Parque del Litoral.

== Old stadium ==
The original "Cholo García" stadium was a multi-purpose stadium in Mayagüez, Puerto Rico, originally built in 1938. It was built using the same specs as Estadio Francisco Montaner and Estadio Idelfonso Morales. The stadium was demolished after the 2006-2007 Puerto Rico Professional Baseball League tournament, and was rebuilt as one of the main facilities where the 2010 Central American and Caribbean Games, held in the city in the late summer of 2010, were staged. The Indios de Mayagüez are now using the new stadium as their ballpark.

The original stadium was named after García, the first Puerto Rican baseball pitcher to ever throw a no-hit no-run game in a final series game in the PRBL. The new facility retains the name. A statue of García resides in front of the stadium's main entrance.

== New stadium ==
The new Isidoro García Baseball Stadium is a 10,500-seat capacity stadium in Mayagüez, Puerto Rico. It hosts the home games of Indios de Mayagüez of the Puerto Rico Baseball League. It hosted the Baseball at the 2010 Central American and Caribbean Games. It replaces the former Isidoro García Baseball Stadium, which closed in 2007, but it is located in the same grounds as the original. The 2011 Caribbean Series was held at the stadium It will house the regional offices of the Sports and Recreation Department of Mayagüez. Then-governor of Puerto Rico Luis Fortuño announced completion of the stadium on February 8, 2010, at a press conference held on the stadium's infield. The stadium was built following Major League Baseball standards.

== Gallery ==
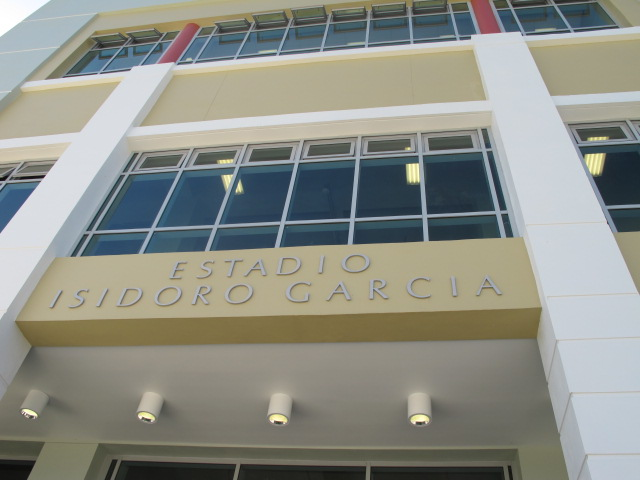
Front of Stadium

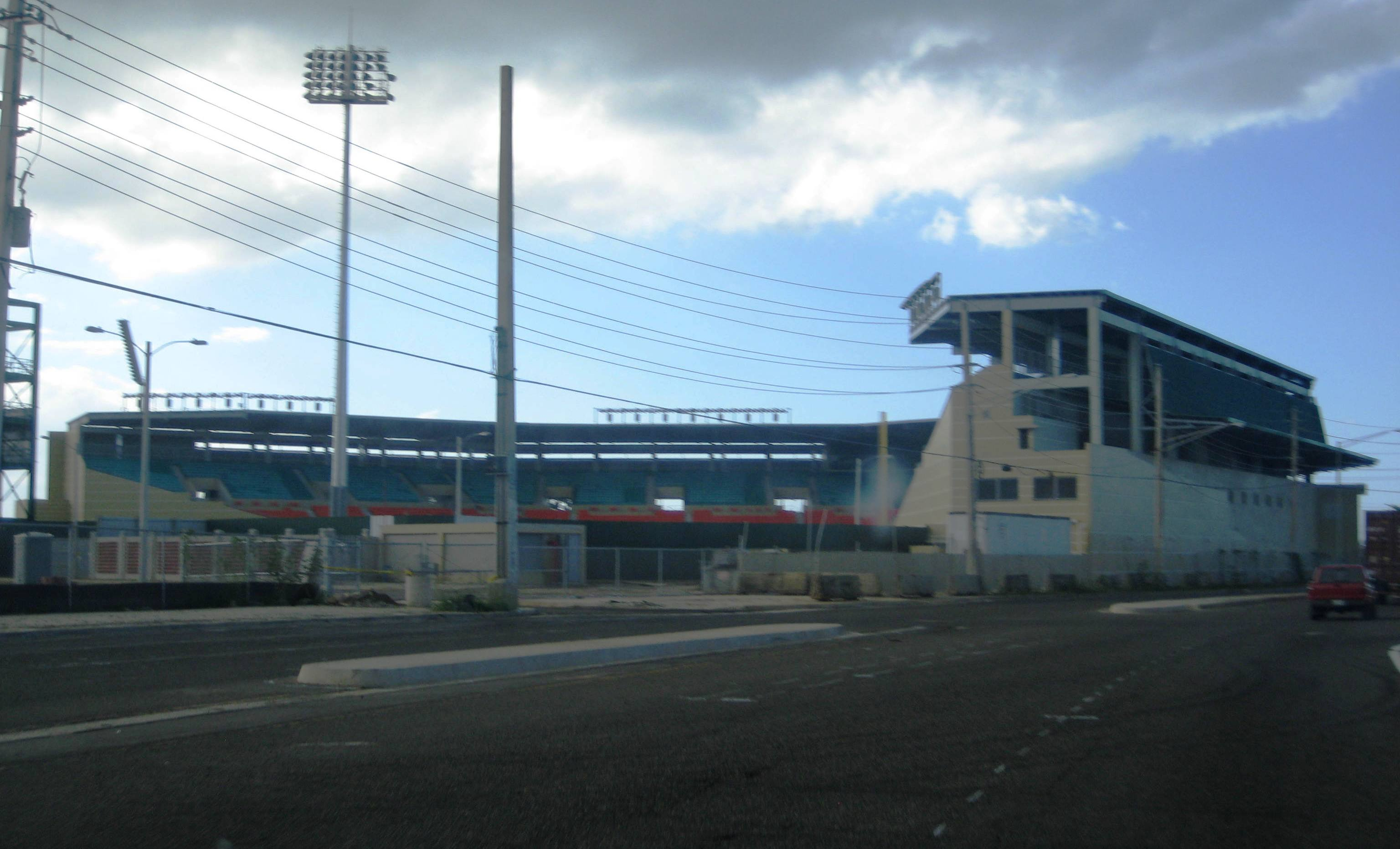
Stadium under construction.

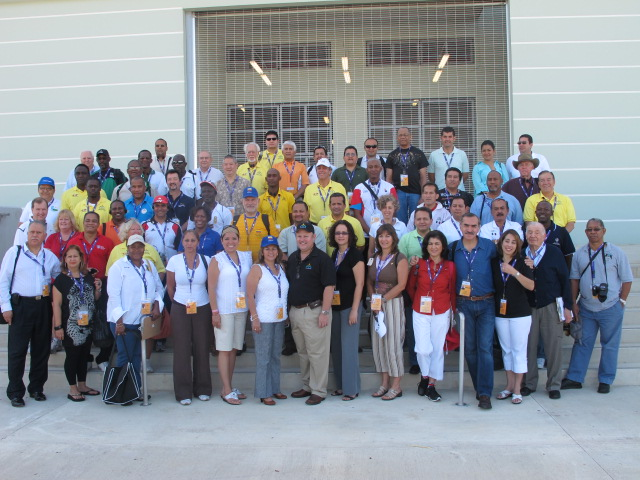
Mission Chiefs of ODACABE Nations in front of the new Isidoro Garcia Stadium

Night view of the Stadium

== See also ==
- Indios de Mayagüez
- 2010 Central American and Caribbean Games
- 2011 Caribbean Series
