= Jim Dwyer (baseball) =

American baseball player (born 1950)

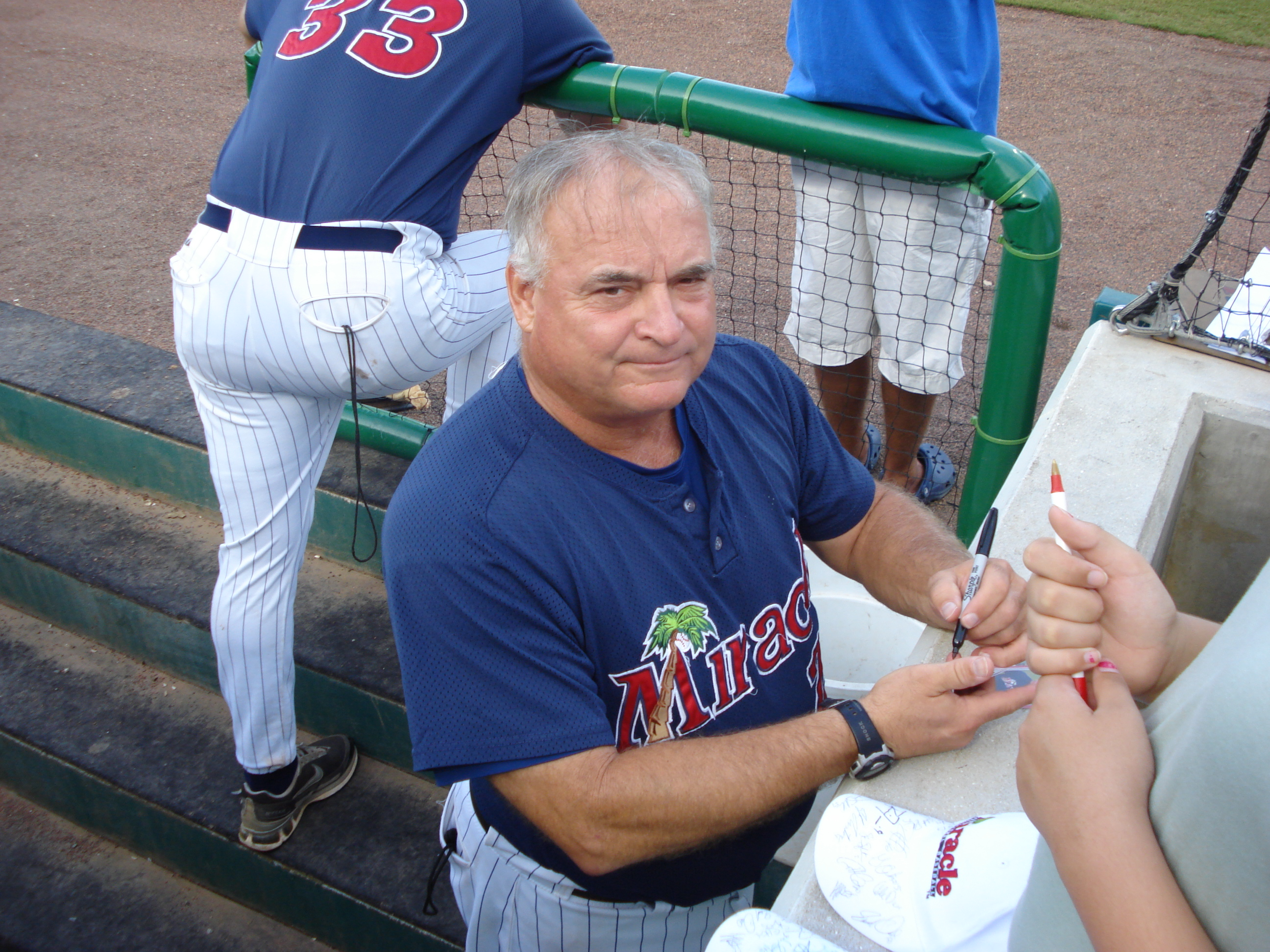
- Coach Dwyer signing autographs for Miracle fans
- Outfielder
- Born: January 3, 1950 (age 76); Evergreen Park, Illinois, U.S.
- Batted: Left Threw: Left

MLB debut
- June 10, 1973, for the St. Louis Cardinals

Last MLB appearance
- June 21, 1990, for the Minnesota Twins

MLB statistics
- Batting average: .260
- Home runs: 77
- Runs batted in: 349
- Stats at Baseball Reference

Teams
- St. Louis Cardinals (1973–1975); Montreal Expos (1975–1976); New York Mets (1976); St. Louis Cardinals (1977–1978); San Francisco Giants (1978); Boston Red Sox (1979–1980); Baltimore Orioles (1981–1988); Minnesota Twins (1988–1989); Montreal Expos (1989); Minnesota Twins (1990)

Career highlights and awards
- World Series champion (1983)

James Edward Dwyer (born January 3, 1950) is an American former professional baseball player who was an outfielder for 18 seasons in Major League Baseball (MLB) for seven different teams between 1973 and 1990. Listed at 5' 10", 185 lb., he batted and threw left-handed.

== MLB career ==
A graduate of St. Laurence High School in Burbank, Illinois, just outside Chicago, Dwyer was selected by the St. Louis Cardinals in the 1971 draft out of Southern Illinois University. Dwyer spent time in the Cardinals' minor league organization in 1971-1973 at Cedar Rapids, Arkansas, Modesto, and Tulsa before debuting in the majors on June 10, 1973 with the Cardinals. He became known as a fastball hitter who was used mostly against right-handed pitching, and played all three outfield positions, mostly as a reserve or spot starter.

Midway through the 1975 season, he was traded to the Montreal Expos (1975–76). Another midseason trade landed him with the New York Mets (1976), who then sent him in the off-season to the Chicago Cubs as part of a three-team trade. Although leading the American Association in batting average, runs, hits and doubles in 1977 for the Wichita Aeros, the Cubs' AAA affiliate, he was released on September 7, 1977 and signed a contract with the Cardinals a week later. After playing parts of the 1977 and 1978 seasons back on the Cardinals, he was traded again, this time to the San Francisco Giants, on June 15, 1978. Just before the 1979 season, Dwyer was purchased from the Giants by the Boston Red Sox. After two seasons with the Red Sox (1979–80), Dwyer signed a three-year free agent contract with the Baltimore Orioles.

With Baltimore, Dwyer became one of Manager Earl Weaver's key platoon players, primarily used as a corner outfielder, designated hitter and pinch-hitter. He enjoyed a good season in 1982, hitting .304 (74-for-260) in 71 games, but his most productive year came in 1983, when he appeared in 100 games while hitting .286 with eight home runs and 38 runs batted in, helping his team to reach the World Series, won by Baltimore in five games. In Game 1 on October 11, 1983, Dwyer became the 18th player to hit a home run in his first World Series at-bat when he homered off John Denny for the Orioles' only run in their 2-1 loss to the Philadelphia Phillies.

In a 13–11 loss to the Texas Rangers at Memorial Stadium on August 6, 1986 which was the first-ever game in MLB history that featured three grand slams, Dwyer hit one in the fourth off Jeff Russell after Larry Sheets had done likewise off Bobby Witt earlier in the same inning. Toby Harrah had hit the first one of the contest off Ken Dixon two innings earlier in the second. During the 1987 season he hit a career-high 15 home runs in 241 at-bats. After a late season trade in 1988 from the Orioles to the Minnesota Twins, Dwyer finished out his career in 1990 with the Twins (which also included a brief stint with the contending Expos late in the 1989 season).

For his career, Dwyer was a .260 hitter (719-for-2761) with 77 home runs and 349 RBI in 1328 games, including 409 runs, 115 doubles, 17 triples, 26 stolen bases, and a .353 on-base percentage. In four postseason games he hit .333 (4-for-12), including one home run, two doubles, four runs, and one RBI.

During the off-season, he played from 1977 to 1980 with the Mayagüez Indians of the Puerto Rican Professional Baseball League, and following his MLB career, Dwyer played for the 1990 Sun City Rays of the Senior Professional Baseball Association.

=== MLB career highlights ===
- While playing for the Expos in 1975, shortly after being traded by the Cardinals, Dwyer was named by MLB as the National League's Player of the Week for the week ending August 3, 1975 with a slash line of .478/.480/.826.
- In the heat of the Orioles' 1982 pennant race, Dwyer reached base 13 consecutive times over 4 games against Detroit and Milwaukee.
- In July 1983, Dwyer started only 12 games, playing a complete game just four times that month. Even without playing regularly, Dwyer was one of the Baltimore Orioles' hottest hitters during the middle of the 1983 pennant race, leading the team that month in batting average (.474), on-base percentage (.574) and slugging average (1.053). Dwyer's surge helped the Orioles to a 11-4 record in the games he played.
- Dwyer was well-known throughout his career as a clutch left-handed pinch hitter, appearing in over 500 games in that role. He is currently 17th on the list of MLB's All-Time Pinch Hit Leaders, garnering career 103 pinch hits, with 10 pinch homers and 74 RBIs.
- Although he was the 246th overall pick (11th round) in the MLB draft, Dwyer's perseverance and versatility carried him to an 18-yr. major league career. In a 2014 essay, noted baseball historian Bill James recognized Dwyer's value by naming him as #4 in his list of "The Greatest Bench Players of All Time."

== Coaching career ==
Following his playing career, Dwyer coached (1991) the Triple A Portland Beavers and then managed the Kenosha Twins (1992) and Fort Wayne Wizards (1993–94) . In 1995, he became hitting coach of the Minnesota Twins' Double-A affiliate, the New Britain Rock Cats, and remained within the Twins' organization in one capacity or another for the rest of his career. He remained with the Rock Cats through 1996 before becoming the Twins' minor league roving hitting coordinator (1997-2005). In 2006, Dwyer became the hitting coach of Minnesota's advanced A affiliate, the Fort Myers Miracle. He retired in 2016 after 11 years as a coach with the Miracle.

== See also ==
- MLB all-time pinch hit leaders
