= Don Heinkel =

American baseball player (born 1959)

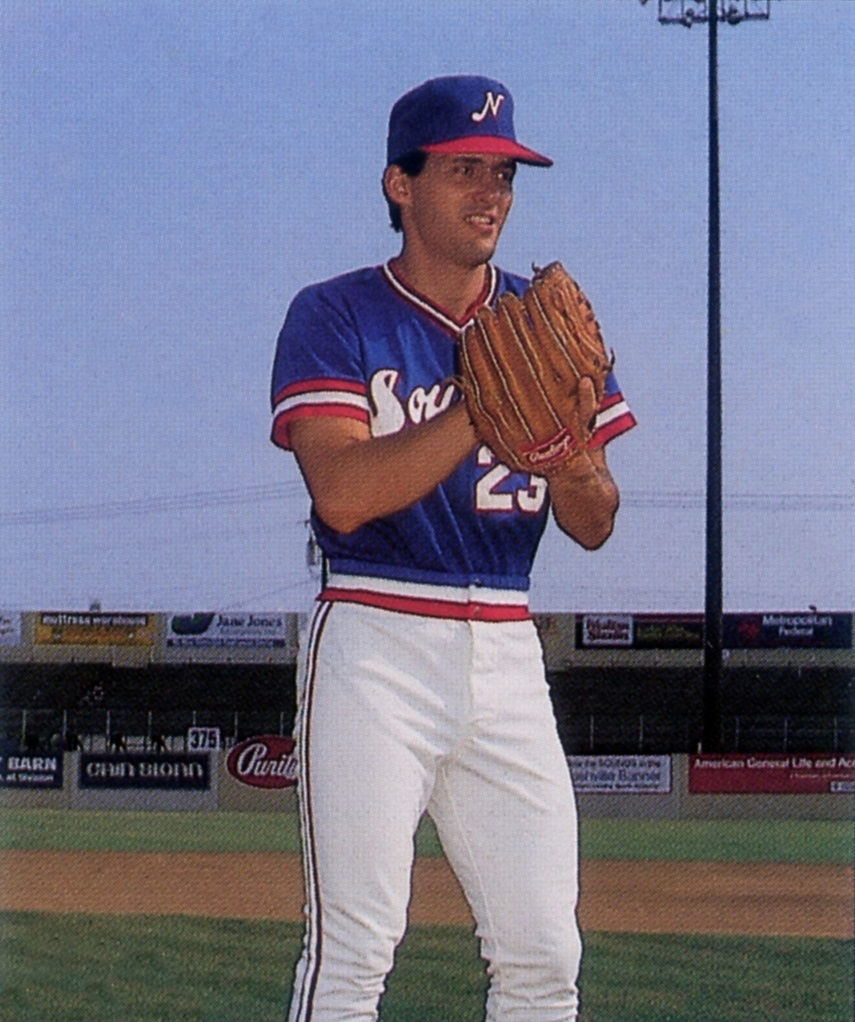
- Heinkel with the Nashville Sounds in 1986
- Pitcher
- Born: October 20, 1959 (age 66); Racine, Wisconsin, U.S.
- Batted: Left Threw: Right

MLB debut
- April 7, 1988, for the Detroit Tigers

Last MLB appearance
- May 18, 1989, for the St. Louis Cardinals

MLB statistics
- Win–loss record: 1–1
- Earned run average: 4.74
- Strikeouts: 46
- Stats at Baseball Reference

Teams
- Detroit Tigers (1988); St. Louis Cardinals (1989)

Member of the College

Baseball Hall of Fame
- Induction: 2010

Donald Elliott Heinkel (born October 20, 1959) is an American former Major League Baseball pitcher. He played during two seasons at the Major League level for the Detroit Tigers and St. Louis Cardinals. Heinkel notched his lone major league save on April 29, 1988. He went 2 scoreless innings to preserve a 9–6 victory over the Mariners. He was drafted by the Tigers in the 30th round of the 1982 amateur draft. Heinkel played his first professional season with their Rookie league Bristol Tigers, Class A-Advanced Lakeland Tigers, and Double-A Birmingham Barons in 1982, and his last with the San Diego Padres' Double-A Wichita Wranglers in 1993.

Heinkel now resides in Alabama with his wife and 11 children. He practices medicine in the Muscle Shoals, Alabama area.

== Sources ==
- Career statistics from Baseball Reference · Baseball Reference (Minors) · Retrosheet · Baseball Almanac
