= José Morales (designated hitter) =

American baseball player (born 1944)

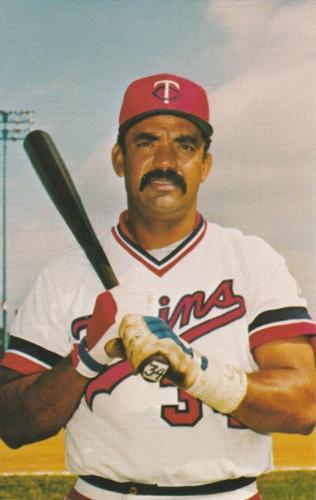
- Designated hitter
- Born: December 30, 1944 (age 81); Frederiksted, U.S. Virgin Islands
- Batted: Right Threw: Right

MLB debut
- August 13, 1973, for the Oakland Athletics

Last MLB appearance
- June 4, 1984, for the Los Angeles Dodgers

MLB statistics
- Batting average: .287
- Home runs: 26
- Runs batted in: 207
- Stats at Baseball Reference

Teams
- As player: Oakland Athletics (1973); Montreal Expos (1973–1977); Minnesota Twins (1978–1980); Baltimore Orioles (1981–1982); Los Angeles Dodgers (1982–1984); As coach: San Francisco Giants (1986–1988); Cleveland Indians (1990–1993); Florida Marlins (1995–1996)

José Manuel Morales Hernández (born December 30, 1944) is an American former designated hitter and coach in Major League Baseball (MLB) who played for five different teams between 1973 and 1984. Listed at 5' 11", 187 lb., Morales batted and threw right-handed.

== Early career ==
Morales was born to a door-to-door shoe salesman in the United States Virgin Islands. He "joked" in 1977 to the Orlando Sentinel that he had "18 half brothers and sisters." The Des Moines Tribune reported, however, that he was raised in poverty as one of 15 children of a shoemaker.

Morales started playing sandlot baseball in his homeland before signing his first professional contract to play in Puerto Rico in late 1963. The San Francisco Giants signed Morales in 1963. He spent two seasons in Class-A (1964–65) and three more at Double-A (1966–68). The Oakland Athletics obtained him from the Giants in the 1968 minor league draft, and though Morales finally advanced to Triple-A, he remained with the Iowa Oaks of the American Association from 1969 to 1971. Then he played on loan to Tidewater, the Mets' Triple-A affiliate, in 1972. Finally, he reached the majors in 1973 with the Athletics, playing for them during part of the season before joining the Montreal Expos (1973–77), Minnesota Twins (1978–80), Baltimore Orioles (1981–82) and Los Angeles Dodgers (1982–84). His contract had been purchased by the Expos from the Athletics on September 18, 1973.

Morales spent nine seasons in the minor leagues before turning into one of the premier pinch-hitters in major league history. One main problem held up his advance: as a catcher, he was a defensive liability, leading four different minor leagues in errors. Indeed, during his majors career, he appeared in the field in only 104 of his 733 total games, and he never collected more than 242 at-bats during a regular season. He is often referred as "a catcher by trade" (30 games), though first base was his most frequent defensive position in the majors (67) and eventually at left field (7). He played much more at DH (265 games) than at any fielding position.

In 1975, Morales enjoyed his first solid season, batting .301 in 93 games with Montreal. For the first of four times, he led the majors pinch-hitters with 15 hits in 51 at-bats (.294). Then, in 1976 he posted a career-high .316 (50-for-158) as he went on to set his pinch-hit single-season record of 25, breaking the previous mark of 24 established by Dave Philley in 1961 and tied by Vic Davalillo in 1970. Morales' record stood until John Vander Wal of the Colorado Rockies had 28 in 1995.

== Later career ==
After Minnesota acquired Morales, he became an effective part-time designated hitter and his pinch-hitting skills remained intact. In 1978 he hit .314 for the Twins and posted an American League leading with 15 pinch-hits. Morales faded the next season (.267), then rebounded in 1980 hitting .303 with eight home runs (a career-high) as his 13 pinch-hits again led the league. He was traded from the Baltimore Orioles to the Los Angeles Dodgers for Leo Hernández on April 28, 1982. Again in the National League, he appeared exclusively as a pinch-hitter with the Dodgers in 1982 and finished 9-for-30 (.300). He saw his only post-season action in 1983, going hitless in two pinch-hit at-bats as Los Angeles lost the NL Championship Series to the Philadelphia Phillies.

In a 12-season career, Morales was a .287 hitter (375-for-1305) with 26 home runs and 207 RBI, including 126 runs, 68 doubles and six triples, hitting .300 five times overall. He struck out in only 13% of his plate appearances (182-for-1305), a testament to his skill as a contact hitter. Over his two decades-plus in the Puerto Rican Winter League, he collected a .290 batting average (840-for-2,901) with 84 home runs and 467 RBI. He also led the league three times in doubles and one in hits. In the 1968–69 season he hit .402 with the San Juan Senators, becoming one of 19 players to break the .400 line in the PRWL. However, his 112 at-bats did not qualify him for the batting title, as he was backing up teammate Johnny Bench.

== Later life ==
Following his playing career, Morales worked as a batting instructor for the Baltimore Orioles, Cleveland Indians, San Francisco Giants and Florida Marlins organizations.

He resides in Montverde, Florida.

== See also ==
- All-Time pinch hits records
- Players from Virgin Islands in MLB
