= Ken Dixon =

American baseball player (born 1960)

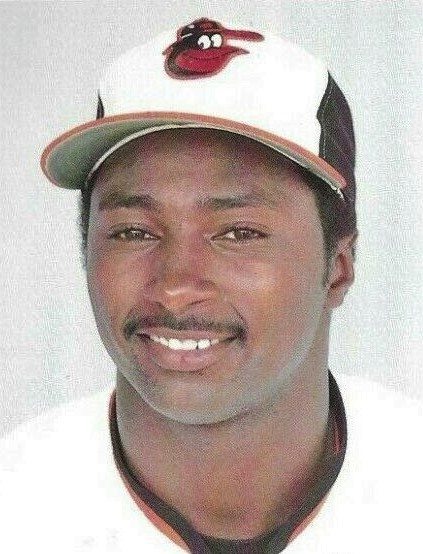
- Pitcher
- Born: October 17, 1960 (age 66); Monroe, Virginia, U.S.
- Batted: Both Threw: Right

MLB debut
- September 22, 1984, for the Baltimore Orioles

Last MLB appearance
- September 14, 1987, for the Baltimore Orioles

MLB statistics
- Win–loss record: 26–28
- Earned run average: 4.66
- Strikeouts: 377
- Stats at Baseball Reference

Teams
- Baltimore Orioles (1984–1987)

Kenneth John Dixon (born October 17, 1960), is an American former professional baseball player who pitched in Major League Baseball from 1984 to 1987. He was drafted in 1980 by the Baltimore Orioles in the third round out of Amherst County High School. Dixon played for the Orioles before being traded to the Seattle Mariners for Mike Morgan, though he never pitched in the majors thereafter.

== Pro career ==
Ken Dixon was drafted by the Baltimore Orioles in the third round of the 1980 Amateur Draft. from there Baltimore assigned Dixon to the Bluefield Orioles, the rookie league affiliate in the Appalachian League. From there Dixon had a bumpy ride going from rookie league to single A ball and recording a 6–14 record for his efforts. Despite compiling losing records as a pitcher for the Orioles affiliate in Charlotte and their triple A affiliate, the Rochester Red Wings, Dixon impressed with his strike outs. So impressive was Dixon, that when he played for the Orioles affiliate in Charlotte, on nights he pitched they handed out "K" cards to fans to hold up every time he struck out a batter. Between Charlotte and Rochester combined, Dixon fanned 107 batters.

Dixon made his major league debut in 1984, appearing in just two games, compiling a 4.16 ERA and striking out 8. Baltimore was impressed enough that they promoted him from Charlotte, skipping a return to Triple A Rochester, as in Double A ball, Dixon compiled a 16–8 record while striking out 211 batters. Dixon spent the entire 1985 season with Baltimore, winning eight, losing four, and striking out 108 batters. In July 1986, Dixon was part of a wild brawl between Baltimore and the Chicago White Sox. It all started after Orioles catcher Rick Dempsey was plunked by White Sox pitcher Gene Nelson. Dempsey tossed off his batters helmet and charged after Nelson. Dixon, who was Baltimore's starting pitcher for the game, got into an altercation with White Sox coach Doug Rader and the men exchanged punches. When the melee was finally over, Dixon, Dempsey, and radar were ejected. Orioles manager Earl Weaver, sticking up for Dixon, played the game under protest, accusing the umpires of signaling out Dixon when other players were also fighting, and the fact that they did not eject Nelson, whose hitting of Dempsey touched off the brawl to start with. The following season he went 11–13 with 170 strike outs, but was beginning to suffer from shoulder ailments. He was assigned to Rochester to work out his issues in 1987 and put together a 4–0 record before he returned to the majors.

Dixon was traded from the Orioles to the Seattle Mariners for pitcher Mike Morgan at the Winter Meetings on December 9, 1987. However, Dixon's arm issued continued and he never pitched for Seattle. He was given his release he signed with Baltimore, playing for their AA team in Hagerstown once again. Dixon was released mid-way through the season and signed as a free agent by the Cleveland Indians. He appeared in a few games for their Double-A club in Canton before he drew his release from Cleveland.

In April 1991, Dixon was driving with a friend when the two men were pulled over. After a search, police found drugs in the car and arrested both men. Dixon said he didn't know the drugs were in the car, but because the drugs where in his car, Dixon was arrested. Early reports claimed Dixon was on a street corner and it was only Dixon that was found with drugs. An angry Dixon called the police department, and spoke with their spokesman, Dennis Hill, who agreed with Dixon the preliminary report by the police department was full of errors and Hill himself later issued a retraction about the arrest.

As for Dixon's shoulder, it was later discovered that the cause of the problem was calcium deposits. It was such a rare condition, that even Dr. James Andrews, a famed sports surgeon, admitted that he'd never encountered something like it before in his medical career. Dixon was able to rehab his ailing shoulder, but by the time the rehab was finished, the chances for him to return to the major leagues was over. In 1996, Dixon made one final attempt at a comeback, playing for the Newburgh Night Hawks, an independent league team. He went 4–2 with 68 strikeouts before finally hanging up the spikes for good at the age of 35.

== Diamond Dream Foundation ==
With his baseball career over and still trying to adjust to life outside of baseball, Dixon teamed with his friend Bob Duff to form the Diamond Dream Foundation, whose goal was to bring the game of baseball to youths in the metro D.C. area. Dixon currently makes appearances at Baltimore Orioles games as an active member of the franchises alumni association, often doing meet and greets and signing autographs for fans.

== Pitching stats ==
- 105 Games
- 26 Wins
- 28 Losses
- 377 Strikeouts
- 4.66 ERA
