= 2011 Caribbean Series =

2011 baseball tournament

Mayagüez 2011 logo

The fifty-third edition of the Caribbean Series (Serie del Caribe) was played in 2011. It was held from February 2 through February 7 with the champions teams from Dominican Republic (Toros del Este), Mexico (Yaquis de Obregón), Puerto Rico (Criollos de Caguas) and Venezuela (Caribes de Anzoátegui). The format consisted of twelve games, in a double round-robin format with each team facing each other twice. The games were played at Isidoro García Stadium in Mayagüez, Puerto Rico.

The 2011 Caribbean Series was dedicated to Hall of Famer Roberto Alomar, as part of the annual tournament's events. In addition to having the Series dedicated to him, the organizing committee of the series announced that Alomar would be inducted into the Caribbean Series Hall of Fame, along with fellow countrymen and former big leaguers Carlos Baerga, Luis de León and Candy Maldonado. The Caribbean Baseball Hall of Fame was established in 1996 and honors stars in the Caribbean, primarily from the Caribbean Series.

== Final standings ==
Country	Club	W	L	W/L %	GB	Managers
Mexico	Yaquis de Obregón	4	2	.667	–	Eddie Díaz
Puerto Rico	Criollos de Caguas	3	3	.500	1	Lino Rivera
Dominican Republic	Toros del Este	3	3	.500	1	Dean Treanor
Venezuela	Caribes de Anzoátegui	2	4	.333	2	Julio Franco

== Scoreboards ==
=== Game 1, February 2 ===
Team	1	2	3	4	5	6	7	8	9	10	11	12	13	14	15	R	H	E
Dominican Republic	0	0	1	0	0	2	0	0	0	0	0	0	0	0	0	3	12	3
Mexico	0	0	0	0	0	0	2	0	1	0	0	0	0	0	1	4	13	2
WP: M. Carrillo (1–0) LP: J. Rosario (0–1); Boxscore

=== Game 2, February 2 ===
Team	1	2	3	4	5	6	7	8	9	R	H	E
Venezuela	4	0	0	0	0	0	1	0	0	5	6	1
Puerto Rico	0	0	1	1	0	0	0	1	0	3	6	3
WP: S. Etherton (1–0) LP: W. Collazo (0–1) Sv: F. Butto (1); Boxscore

=== Game 3, February 3 ===
Team	1	2	3	4	5	6	7	8	9	R	H	E
Venezuela	0	1	0	2	0	0	0	0	2	5	8	0
Dominican Republic	0	1	2	1	0	0	1	1	x	6	9	0
WP: W. Arias (1-0) LP: E. Figueroa (0-1) Sv: J. Mañón (1); Home runs: VEN: L. Jiménez 2 (2), J. Melián (1); DOM: K. Barker (1); Boxscore

=== Game 4, February 3 ===
Team	1	2	3	4	5	6	7	8	9	R	H	E
Puerto Rico	5	0	0	0	1	1	0	0	0	7	13	2
Mexico	1	2	0	0	0	0	0	0	0	3	12	3
WP: J. Padilla (1-0) LP: Rol. Valdez (0-1); Boxscore

=== Game 5, February 4 ===
Team	1	2	3	4	5	6	7	8	9	R	H	E
Mexico	0	0	2	0	4	1	0	0	0	7	8	2
Venezuela	0	0	0	0	1	1	1	0	0	3	7	4
WP: M. Quevedo (1-0) LP: R. Ramírez (0-1); Boxscore

=== Game 6, February 4 ===
Team	1	2	3	4	5	6	7	8	9	R	H	E
Dominican Republic	0	0	0	0	0	1	0	0	3	4	11	1
Puerto Rico	0	0	1	0	1	0	1	0	0	3	8	0
WP: H. Sánchez (1-0) LP: S. Rivera (0-1) Sv: J. Mañón (2); Boxscore

=== Game 7, February 5 ===
Team	1	2	3	4	5	6	7	8	9	R	H	E
Mexico	0	0	0	1	0	0	0	2	3	6	13	1
Dominican Republic	0	1	0	1	1	0	0	0	0	3	10	1
WP: A. Guerrero (1-0) LP: J. Rosario (0-2) Sv: L. Ayala (1); Home runs: MEX: K. García (1), J. Vázquez (1); DOM: None; Boxscore

=== Game 8, February 5 ===
Team	1	2	3	4	5	6	7	8	9	10	R	H	E
Puerto Rico	0	1	1	0	0	0	0	0	0	2	4	6	1
Venezuela	0	0	0	0	1	0	1	0	0	0	2	7	2
WP: E. Ramos (1-0) LP: L. Ramírez (0-1) Sv: K. Calero (1); Boxscore

=== Game 9, February 6 ===
Team	1	2	3	4	5	6	7	8	9	R	H	E
Dominican Republic	0	0	0	0	0	0	0	0	0	0	8	1
Venezuela	0	0	0	1	1	0	0	1	x	3	6	1
WP: M. Ayala (1-0) LP: E. de la Cruz (0-1) Sv: F. Butto (2); Home runs: DOM: None; VEN: A. Espinoza (1); Boxscore

=== Game 10, February 6 ===
Team	1	2	3	4	5	6	7	8	9	R	H	E
Mexico	0	2	0	0	2	0	1	0	1	6	10	0
Puerto Rico	1	3	0	0	2	0	0	1	x	7	13	2
WP: J. Padilla (2-0) LP: D. Guerrero (0-1) Sv: J. Torres (1); Home runs: MEX: K. García (2); PUR: None; Boxscore

=== Game 11, February 7 ===
Team	1	2	3	4	5	6	7	8	9	R	H	E
Venezuela	0	0	0	2	0	0	0	0	0	2	9	0
Mexico	0	0	0	0	0	3	0	0	x	3	7	0
WP: A. Ramírez (1-0) LP: S. Etherton (1-1) Sv: L. Ayala (2); Home runs: VEN: E. Alfonzo (1); MEX: J. Vázquez (2); Boxscore

=== Game 12, February 7 ===
Team	1	2	3	4	5	6	7	8	9	R	H	E
Puerto Rico	0	0	0	0	0	0	0	0	0	0	4	2
Dominican Republic	0	0	0	2	0	0	1	0	x	3	6	2
WP: Ra. Valdez (1-0) LP: W. Collazo (0-2) Sv: J. Mañón (3); Boxscore

== Individual leaders ==
Player	Statistic
Ruddy Yan (DOM)	Batting average	.556
Karim García (MEX); Luis Jiménez (VEN); Jorge Vázquez (MEX)	Home runs	2
Jorge Vázquez (MEX)	RBI	6
Justin Christian (MEX); Alex Cora (PUR)	Runs	7
Ruddy Yan (DOM)	Hits	10
Robinson Cancel (DOM); Jackson Melián (VEN)	Doubles	3
Alejandro de Aza (DOM); Welington Castillo (DOM); Esteban Germán (DOM)	Triples	1
Alex Cora (PUR); Esteban Germán; Leo Heras (MEX); Henry Rodríguez (VEN)	Stolen bases	2
Ruddy Yan (DOM)	OBP	.635
Jackson Melián (VEN)	SLG	.684
Jackson Melián (VEN)	OPS	1.118
Daniel Guerrero (MEX)	Games pitched	5
Juan Padilla (PUR)	Wins	2
Raúl Valdez (DOM)	Strikeouts	11
Raúl Valdez (DOM)	ERA	0.64
Raúl Valdez (DOM)	Innings pitched	14.0
Julio Mañón (DOM)	Saves	3

== All-Star Team ==
Name	Position
Iker Franco (MEX)	catcher
Jorge Vázquez (MEX)	first baseman
Alex Cora (PUR)	second baseman
Danny Richar (DOM)	third baseman
Henry Rodríguez (VEN)	shortstop
Ruddy Yan (DOM)	left fielder
José Constanza (DOM)	center fielder
Karim García (MEX)	right fielder
Bárbaro Cañizares (MEX)	designated hitter
Raúl Valdez (DOM)	starting pitcher
Juan Padilla (PUR)	relief pitcher
Awards
Jorge Vázquez (MEX)	Most Valuable Player
Eddie Díaz (MEX)	Manager
