= Muhammad Hussain (baseball) =

Pakistani baseball player

Karachi Monarchs – No. 33
- Infielder
- Born: 5 December 1997 (age 28); Chiniot, Punjab, Pakistan
- Bats: Right Throws: Right
- Stats at Baseball Reference
Medals
Men's baseball
Representing Pakistan
West Asia Cup
Gold medal – first place	2023 Islamabad	Team
Silver medal – second place	2025 Karaj	Team
Arab Classic
Gold medal – first place	2024 Dubai	Team

Muhammad Hussain (Note: Also listed as Hussain Hussain) (born 5 December 1997) is a Pakistani professional baseball player who plays for the Karachi Monarchs of Baseball United, as well as the Pakistan national team.

== Club career ==
Hussain plays for the "Army" club of the Pakistan Men's National Baseball Championship.

On September 23, 2025, the Karachi Monarchs announced they had signed Hussain for the team's inaugural 2025 winter league season, making him one of Pakistan's first players to sign a professional contract.

== International career ==
Hussain played for the national team at the 2018 Asian Games. At the 2023 World Baseball Classic qualifiers, he went 2–for-2 at the plate. At the 2023 West Asia Baseball Cup, he scored two runs in the championship win over Palestine. At the 2023 Asian Baseball Championship, he went 1-for-17 with one walk.

At the inaugural 2024 Baseball United Arab Classic in Dubai, Hussain hit the first home run in the tournament’s history. Pakistan won the tournament, defeating the United Arab Emirates in the championship game, he was honored as part of the all-tournament team, at third base, and named the tournament's MVP.

Hussain went 6-for-11 (hitting .545) at the 2025 West Asia Baseball Cup in Karaj, Iran, leading the team in OPS (1.188).
