= 2008 Little League World Series results =

Children's baseball competition results

The results of the 2008 Little League World Series were determined between August 15 and August 24, 2008 in South Williamsport, Pennsylvania. 16 teams were divided into four groups, two with four teams from the United States and two with four international teams each, playing in a round robin format. In each group, the top two teams advanced to the knockout stage. The last remaining team from the United States faced the last remaining international team for the Little League World Series Championship.

Pool play
Pool A	(Indiana) IN 2 (Maryland) MD 3◄ Linescore	(Louisiana) LA 5◄ (Washington (state)) WA 1 Linescore	(Indiana) IN 0 (Louisiana) LA 9◄ Linescore	(Washington (state)) WA 15◄ (Maryland) MD 5 (F/5); Linescore	(Washington (state)) WA 3◄ (Indiana) IN 2 (F/7); Linescore	(Louisiana) LA 4 (Maryland) MD 6◄ Linescore
Pool B	(Florida) FL 10◄ (South Dakota) SD 0 (F/4); Linescore	(Connecticut) CT 1 (Hawaii) HI 3◄ Linescore	(South Dakota) SD 4 (Connecticut) CT 9◄ Linescore	(Florida) FL 2 (Hawaii) HI 10◄ Linescore	(South Dakota) SD 4 (Hawaii) HI 6◄ Linescore	(Florida) FL 8◄ (Connecticut) CT 2 (F/7); Linescore
Pool C	(Mexico) MEX 6◄ (Curaçao) CUR 2 Linescore	(Italy) ITA 6 (Guam) GUM 7◄ Linescore	(Italy) ITA 0 (F/4) (Mexico) MEX 12◄ Linescore	(Guam) GUM 0 (F/4) (Mexico) MEX 10◄ Linescore	(Curaçao) CUR 14◄ (Italy) ITA 1 (F/4); Linescore	(Curaçao) CUR 3◄ (Guam) GUM 0 Linescore
Pool D	(Venezuela) VEN 8◄ (Canada) CAN 1 Linescore	(Japan) JPN 5◄ (Saudi Arabia) SAU 0 Linescore	(Canada) CAN 3 (Japan) JPN 9◄ Linescore	(Venezuela) VEN 12◄ (Saudi Arabia) SAU 0 Linescore	(Venezuela) VEN 4 (F/7) (Japan) JPN 5◄ Linescore	(Canada) CAN 7◄ (Saudi Arabia) SAU 5 Linescore
Elimination round
Semifinals	Curaçao 4 Japan 11◄ Linescore			(Washington (state)) Washington 4 Hawaii 9◄ Linescore		
Semifinals	Venezuela 2 Mexico 5◄ Linescore			Florida 1 Louisiana 6◄ Linescore		
Finals	Japan 4 Mexico 5◄ Linescore			Hawaii 7◄ Louisiana 5 Linescore		
Consolation Game	Louisiana 3 Japan 4◄ Linescore					
Championship Game	Hawaii 12◄ Mexico 3 Linescore					

== Pool Play ==
=== Pool A ===
Pool A
Rank	Region	Record	Runs Allowed	Run Ratio
1	Louisiana	2–1	7	0.412
2	(Washington (state)) Washington	2–1	12	0.706
3	Maryland	2–1	21	1.235
4	Indiana	0–3	15	1.285

==== Maryland 3, Indiana 2 ====
August 15 8:00 pm EDT Little League Volunteer Stadium
Team	1	2	3	4	5	6	R	H	E
Indiana	0	0	1	1	0	0	2	3	1
Maryland ◄	1	0	0	0	2	X	3	0	1
WP: Josh Barron (1–0) LP: Drew Ellis (0–1) Sv: none Home runs: IN: Austin Hines (1); MD: None; Boxscore

==== Louisiana 5, Washington 1 ====
August 16 8:00 pm EDT Lamade Stadium
Team	1	2	3	4	5	6	R	H	E
(Washington (state)) Washington	0	0	0	1	0	0	1	3	2
Louisiana ◄	0	2	2	0	1	X	5	8	1
WP: Kennon Fontenot (1–0) LP: Jason Todd (0–1) Sv: none Home runs: WA: None; LA: None; Boxscore

==== Louisiana 9, Indiana 0 ====
August 17 3:30 pm EDT Lamade Stadium
Team	1	2	3	4	5	6	R	H	E
Indiana	0	0	0	0	0	0	0	0	3
Louisiana ◄	5	1	1	2	0	X	9	8	1
WP: Trey Quinn (1–0) LP: Dalton Duley (0–1) Sv: none Home runs: IN: None; LA: None; Boxscore

==== Washington 15, Maryland 5 ====
August 18 Noon EDT Lamade Stadium
Team	1	2	3	4	5	6	R	H	E
(Washington (state)) Washington ◄	5	2	1	0	7	-	15	16	2
Maryland	3	1	0	1	0	-	5	7	1
WP: Derrick Mahlum (1–0) LP: Zane Schreiber (0–1) Sv: none Home runs: WA: Alec Kisena 2 (2), Jason Todd (1), Alek Baumgartner (1); MA: Andrew Yacyk (1); Notes: Completed early due to mercy rule. Boxscore

==== Washington 3, Indiana 2 ====
August 19 2:00 pm EDT Lamade Stadium
Team	1	2	3	4	5	6	7	R	H	E
Indiana	1	1	0	0	0	0	0	2	6	3
(Washington (state)) Washington ◄	1	0	0	0	1	0	1	3	7	1
WP: Alec Kisena (1–0) LP: Christopher Wenger (0–1) Sv: none Home runs: IN: None; WA: Jason Todd (2); Boxscore

==== Maryland 6, Louisiana 4 ====
August 19 8:00 pm EDT Lamade Stadium
Team	1	2	3	4	5	6	R	H	E
Louisiana	0	0	0	0	0	4	4	4	0
Maryland ◄	0	0	4	2	0	X	6	8	1
WP: Andrew Yacyk (1–0) LP: Gunner Leger (0–1) Sv: Josh Barron (1); Home runs: LA: None; MD: Ryan Bayrd (1), Andrew Yacyk (2), Zane Schreiber (1); Boxscore

=== Pool B ===
Pool B
Rank	Region	Record	Runs Allowed	Run Ratio
1	Hawaii	3–0	7	0.389
2	Florida	2–1	12	0.750
3	Connecticut	1–2	15	0.833
4	South Dakota	0–3	25	1.167

==== Florida 10, South Dakota 0 ====
August 15 2:00 pm EDT Little League Volunteer Stadium
Team	1	2	3	4	5	6	R	H	E
Florida ◄	8	2	0	0	-	-	10	8	2
South Dakota	0	0	0	0	-	-	0	0	1
WP: Darren Miller (1–0) LP: Tanner Simons (0–1) Sv: none Home runs: FL: None; SD: None; Notes: Completed early due to mercy rule. Boxscore

==== Hawaii 3, Connecticut 1 ====
August 15 6:00 pm EDT Little League Volunteer Stadium
Team	1	2	3	4	5	6	R	H	E
Connecticut	0	1	0	0	0	0	1	2	2
Hawaii ◄	1	0	0	1	1	X	3	5	0
WP: Caleb Duhay (1–0) LP: Eddie Kochiss (0–1) Sv: Tanner Tokunaga (1); Home runs: CT: Eddie Kochiss (1); HI: Pikai Winchester (1); Boxscore

==== Connecticut 9, South Dakota 4 ====
August 16 3:30 pm EDT Lamade Stadium
Team	1	2	3	4	5	6	R	H	E
South Dakota	1	0	0	0	0	3	4	5	5
Connecticut ◄	0	2	0	7	0	X	9	6	0
WP: Bobby Moretti (1–0) LP: Cale Fierro (0–1) Sv: none Home runs: SD: None; CT: Marcello Ursini (1); Boxscore

==== Hawaii 10, Florida 2 ====
August 17 8:00 pm EDT Lamade Stadium
Team	1	2	3	4	5	6	R	H	E
Florida	2	0	0	0	0	0	2	6	3
Hawaii ◄	0	0	4	2	4	X	10	7	0
WP: Trevor Ling (1–0) LP: Kevin Merrell (0–1) Sv: none Home runs: FL: None; HI: Tanner Tokunaga (1); Boxscore

==== Hawaii 6, South Dakota 4 ====
August 18 3:00 pm EDT Lamade Stadium
Team	1	2	3	4	5	6	R	H	E
South Dakota	0	0	0	3	1	0	4	4	3
Hawaii ◄	0	1	0	3	2	X	6	9	1
WP: Jedd Andrade (1–0) LP: Jesse Riddle (0–1) Sv: Keelen Obedoza (1); Home runs: SD: Cale Fierro (1); HI: Keelen Obedoza (1); Boxscore

==== Florida 8, Connecticut 2 ====
August 18 6:00 pm EDT Lamade Stadium
Team	1	2	3	4	5	6	7	R	H	E
Florida ◄	0	0	0	1	0	1	6	8	10	0
Connecticut	0	0	0	1	1	0	0	2	7	0
WP: Levi Gilcrease (1–0) LP: Tyler Tice (0–1); Home runs: FL: Kevin Merrell 2 (2); CT: Danny Lastra (1), Brett Wilkozs (1); Boxscore

=== Pool C ===
Pool C
Rank	Region	Record	Runs Allowed	Run Ratio
1	Mexico	3–0	2	0.133
2	Curaçao	2–1	7	0.438
3	Guam	1–2	19	1.425
4	Italy	0–3	33	2.828

==== Mexico 6, Curaçao 2 ====
August 16 11:00 am EDT Lamade Stadium
Team	1	2	3	4	5	6	R	H	E
Mexico ◄	0	0	0	0	5	1	6	4	1
Curaçao	0	0	0	0	0	2	2	3	0
WP: Carlos Balboa (1–0) LP: Entwin Reigina (0–1) Sv: none Home runs: MEX: Sergio Rodriguez (1); CUR: None; Boxscore

==== Guam 7, Italy 6 ====
August 16 1:00 pm EDT Little League Volunteer Stadium
Team	1	2	3	4	5	6	R	H	E
Italy	4	0	1	0	1	0	6	9	0
Guam ◄	0	2	0	0	3	2	7	6	3
WP: Nicholas Cruz (1–0) LP: Lorenzo Fabbri (0–1) Sv: none Home runs: ITA: None; GUM: None; Boxscore

==== Mexico 12, Italy 0 ====
August 17 Noon EDT Little League Volunteer Stadium
Team	1	2	3	4	5	6	R	H	E
Italy	0	0	0	0	-	-	0	0	0
Mexico ◄	4	2	6	X	-	-	12	11	0
WP: Jesus Sauceda (1–0) LP: Mirco Bannini (0–1) Sv: none Home runs: ITA: None; MEX: Tomas Castillo 2 (2), Jesus Sauceda (2); Notes: Completed early due to mercy rule. Boxscore

==== Mexico 10, Guam 0 ====
August 18 1:00 pm EDT Little League Volunteer Stadium
Team	1	2	3	4	5	6	R	H	E
Guam	0	0	0	0	-	-	0	2	0
Mexico ◄	0	7	2	1	-	-	10	10	0
WP: Jesus Sauceda (2–0) LP: Parish Reyes (0–1) Sv: none Home runs: GUM: None; MEX: Tomas Castillo (3), Sergio Rodriguez (2), Emmanuel Rodriguez (1), Carlos Balboa (1); Notes: Completed early due to mercy rule. Boxscore

==== Curaçao 14, Italy 1 ====
August 18 4:00 pm EDT Little League Volunteer Stadium
Team	1	2	3	4	5	6	R	H	E
Italy	0	1	0	0	-	-	1	1	2
Curaçao ◄	1	6	7	X	-	-	14	11	0
WP: Jayson Libert (1–0) LP: Luca Bortolotti (0–1) Sv: none Home runs: ITA: None; CUR: Juremi Profar 2 (2), Tivon Faneyte (1), Hemsley Martha (1); Notes: Completed early due to mercy rule. Boxscore

==== Curaçao 3, Guam 0 ====
August 19 6:00 pm EDT Little League Volunteer Stadium
Team	1	2	3	4	5	6	R	H	E
Curaçao ◄	0	0	0	1	2	0	3	5	0
Guam	0	0	0	0	0	0	0	1	1
WP: Tivon Faneyte (1–0) LP: Nicholas Cruz (1–1) Sv: none Home runs: CUR: None; GUM: None; Boxscore

=== Pool D ===
Pool D
Rank	Region	Record	Runs Allowed	Run Ratio
1	Japan	3–0	7	0.368
2	Venezuela	2–1	6	0.316
3	Canada	1-2	22	1.222
4	Saudi Arabia	0–3	24	1.412

==== Venezuela 8, Canada 1 ====
August 15 4:00 pm EDT Lamade Stadium
Team	1	2	3	4	5	6	R	H	E
Venezuela ◄	1	1	4	0	0	2	8	10	1
Canada	0	1	0	0	0	0	1	3	2
WP: Kevin Morales (1–0) LP: Riley Edwards (0–1) Sv: none Home runs: VEN: Gustavo Perdomo (1); CAN: None; Boxscore

==== Japan 5, Saudi Arabia 0 ====
August 16 6:00 pm EDT Little League Volunteer Stadium
Team	1	2	3	4	5	6	R	H	E
Japan ◄	0	0	1	0	0	4	5	5	0
Saudi Arabia	0	0	0	0	0	0	0	1	2
WP: Ryosuke Moriuchi (1–0) LP: Chris Beyers (0–1) Sv: none Home runs: JPN: None; SAU: None; Boxscore

==== Japan 9, Canada 3 ====
August 17 1:00 pm EDT Little League Volunteer Stadium
Team	1	2	3	4	5	6	R	H	E
Japan ◄	0	2	0	1	4	2	9	10	3
Canada	0	0	0	1	0	2	3	4	4
WP: Takumi Ozeki (1–0) LP: Kevin Irving (0–1) Sv: none Home runs: JPN: Yutaka Takeshita (1), Takumi Ozeki (1); CAN: None; Boxscore

==== Venezuela 12, Saudi Arabia 0 ====
August 17 6:00 pm EDT Little League Volunteer Stadium
Team	1	2	3	4	5	6	R	H	E
Venezuela ◄	1	4	0	0	3	4	12	14	0
Saudi Arabia	0	0	0	0	0	0	0	7	1
WP: Aroldo Sanchez (1–0) LP: Beau Branton (0–1) Sv: none Home runs: VEN: Gustavo Perdomo (2); SAU: None; Boxscore

==== Japan 5, Venezuela 4 ====
August 19 Noon EDT Lamade Stadium
Team	1	2	3	4	5	6	7	R	H	E
Japan ◄	0	3	0	0	0	0	2	5	3	2
Venezuela	0	0	3	0	0	0	1	4	8	2
WP: Yutaka Takeshita (1–0) LP: Gustavo Perdomo (0–1) Sv: none Home runs: JPN: None; VEN: Aroldo Sanchez (1); Boxscore

==== Canada 7, Saudi Arabia 5 ====
August 19 4:00 pm EDT Lamade Stadium
Team	1	2	3	4	5	6	R	H	E
Saudi Arabia	2	2	0	0	1	0	5	7	3
Canada ◄	0	0	2	0	5	0	7	6	8
WP: Riley Edwards (1–1) LP: Bryce Jackson (0–1) Sv: Preston Kokotailo (1); Home runs: SAU: Zach Ell (1); CAN: Jake Hagen (1), Eric Watkins (1); Boxscore

== Elimination round ==
Quarter-finals
August 20 – 4:00 pm - Lamade
Japan	11
Curaçao	4
August 21 – 4:00 pm - Lamade
Mexico	5
Venezuela	2
August 20 – 8:00 pm - Lamade
Hawaii	9
(Washington (state)) Washington	4
August 21 – 8:00pm - Lamade
Louisiana	6
Florida	1

Semi-finals
August 23 – 12:30 pm - Lamade
Japan	4
Mexico	5
August 24 – 3:30 pm - Lamade
Hawaii	7
Louisiana	5

Final
August 24 – 3:30 pm - Lamade
Mexico	3
Hawaii	12
Third place
August 24 – 12:00 pm - Volunteer
Japan	4
Louisiana	3

=== International semifinals ===
==== Japan 11, Curaçao 4 ====
August 20 16:00 EDT Lamade Stadium
Team	1	2	3	4	5	6	R	H	E
Japan ◄	1	6	1	0	0	3	11	7	0
Curaçao	3	0	0	0	0	1	4	6	1
WP: Takumi Ozeki (2–0) LP: Junters Dosset (0–1) Sv: none Home runs: JPN: Ryohji Kimura (1), Takumi Ozeki (2); CUR: Tivon Faneyte (2), Juremi Profar (3); Boxscore

==== Mexico 5, Venezuela 2 ====
August 21 4:00 pm EDT Lamade Stadium
Team	1	2	3	4	5	6	R	H	E
Venezuela	0	1	0	0	0	1	2	6	0
Mexico ◄	1	0	0	4	0	X	5	8	2
WP: Sergio Rodriguez (1–0) LP: Kevin Morales (1–1) Sv: none Home runs: VEN: None; MEX: Sergio Rodriguez (3); Boxscore

=== United States semifinals ===
==== Hawaii 9, Washington 4 ====
August 20 8:00 pm EDT Lamade Stadium
Team	1	2	3	4	5	6	R	H	E
(Washington (state)) Washington	2	1	0	1	0	0	4	7	2
Hawaii ◄	4	0	3	2	0	X	9	8	0
WP: Caleb Duhay (2–0) LP: Derrick Mahlum (1–1) Sv: none Home runs: WA: K. J. Neaville (1); HI: Tanner Tokunaga (2), Iolana Akau (3), Pikai Winchester 2 (3); Boxscore

==== Louisiana 6, Florida 1 ====
August 21 8:00 pm EDT Lamade Stadium
Team	1	2	3	4	5	6	R	H	E
Florida	0	0	1	0	0	0	1	2	1
Louisiana ◄	0	3	1	2	0	X	6	6	1
WP: Kennon Fontenot (2–0) LP: Michael McGuire (0–1) Sv: none Home runs: FL: None; LA: Bryce Jordan (1); Boxscore

=== International final ===
==== Mexico 5, Japan 4 ====
August 23 Noon EDT Lamade Stadium
Team	1	2	3	4	5	6	R	H	E
Japan	2	0	0	0	2	0	4	6	0
Mexico ◄	0	0	5	0	0	X	5	9	3
WP: Carlos Balboa (2–0) LP: Ryosuke Moriuchi (1–1) Sv: Jesus Sauceda (1); Home runs: JPN: None; MEX: Sergio Rodriguez (4); Boxscore

=== United States final ===
==== Hawaii 7, Louisiana 5 ====
August 23 4:00 pm EDT Lamade Stadium
Team	1	2	3	4	5	6	R	H	E
Hawaii ◄	0	0	1	0	0	6	7	10	1
Louisiana	0	0	0	3	2	0	5	7	1
WP: Trevor Ling (2–0) LP: Gunner Leger (0–2) Sv: none Home runs: HI: None; LA: Kennon Fontenot (1); Boxscore

=== Consolation Game ===
==== Japan 4, Louisiana 3 ====
August 24 Noon EDT Little League Volunteer Stadium
Team	1	2	3	4	5	6	R	H	E
Louisiana	3	0	0	0	0	0	3	4	1
Japan ◄	3	0	0	0	1	X	4	7	3
WP: Takumi Ozeki (2–0) LP: Peyton McLemore (0–1) Sv: Shodai Mizuno (1); Home runs: LA: None; JPN: None; Boxscore

=== Championship Game ===
==== Hawaii 12, Mexico 3 ====
August 24 3:30 pm EDT Lamade Stadium
Team	1	2	3	4	5	6	R	H	E
Hawaii ◄	1	2	1	3	4	1	12	11	1
Mexico	0	1	2	0	0	0	3	6	3
WP: Caleb Duhay (3–0) LP: Sergio Rodriguez (1–1); Home runs: HI: Tanner Tokunaga 2 (4), Iolana Akau (4); MEX: Jesus Sauceda (3); Boxscore
