= Brian Reith =

American baseball player (born 1978)

Minnesota Twins
- Pitching coach
- Born: February 28, 1978 (age 48); Fort Wayne, Indiana, U.S.
- Batted: Right Threw: Right

Professional debut
- MLB: May 16, 2001, for the Cincinnati Reds
- CPBL: July 1, 2007, for the Uni-President Lions

Last appearance
- MLB: June 14, 2004, for the Cincinnati Reds
- CPBL: 2007, for the Uni-President Lions

MLB statistics
- Win–loss record: 4–12
- Earned run average: 5.92
- Strikeouts: 85

CPBL statistics
- Win–loss record: 7–3
- Earned run average: 4.17
- Strikeouts: 60
- Stats at Baseball Reference

Teams
- Cincinnati Reds (2001, 2003–2004); Uni-President Lions (2007)

Career highlights and awards
- Taiwan Series champion (2007)

Brian Eric Reith (born February 28, 1978) is an American former professional baseball pitcher. He is the current Pitching coach for the Minnesota Twins of Major League Baseball (MLB).

== Career ==
He was drafted by the New York Yankees in the 6th round of the 1996 Major League Baseball draft. He was traded with Drew Henson, Jackson Melián, and Ed Yarnall for Denny Neagle and Mike Frank. Reith made his Major League debut playing for the Cincinnati Reds in 2001.

In 2007, Reith played for the Somerset Patriots in the independent Atlantic League. In 8 games, he was 2–3 with a 2.70 ERA before signing with the Uni-President Lions in the CPBL. Again with Somerset in 2008, he started 8 games before eventually becoming the closer. Reith went 5–4 with a 3.94 ERA and 16 saves during the season.

In December 2008, Reith signed a minor league contract with the Milwaukee Brewers, but was released before the 2009 season's start. He split the 2009 season between the Tigres de Quintana Roo of the Mexican League and two independent teams, the Joliet JackHammers of the Northern League and the Camden Riversharks of the Atlantic League.

Reith served as the pitching coach for the Durham Bulls for 5 seasons before being hired as the pitching coach for the Minnesota Twins on October 14, 2026.
