= Eddie Díaz =

Dominican baseball player (born 1963)

- Catcher / Manager
- Born: 16 August 1963 (age 63); San Francisco de Macorís, Dominican Republic
- Bats: Right Throws: Right

Career highlights and awards
- Yaquis de Obregón #42 retired
Medals
Men's baseball
Manager for the United Arab Emirates
Arab Classic
Silver medal – second place	2024 Dubai	Team

Eduardo Díaz Díaz (born 16 August 1963) is a Dominican former professional baseball catcher and manager, and current executive. He played in Minor League Baseball in the organizations of the New York Yankees, Atlanta Braves, and Cleveland Indians from 1980 to 1984. Since the end of his playing career, he has managed extensively in Mexico and elsewhere.

Díaz managed the Guerreros de Oaxaca of the Mexican League in the 2010 and 2011 seasons, twice earning a playoff berth. In 2012, he was appointed as manager of the Diablos Rojos del México; before the season started, he led the team in an exhibition series against MLB's Texas Rangers. He was dismissed on 28 September 2012. In the 2015 Mexican League season, he skippered the Toros de Tijuana, compiling a 26–31 record before being dismissed and replaced by Juan Gabriel Castro.

In the Mexican Pacific League (LMP), Díaz first managed with the Venados de Mazatlán in the 2007–08 season, managing the team to an 18–11 record and a finals berth. Moving to Yaquis de Obregón the following year, he led the team to three consecutive LMP titles (2011–13) and two consecutive Caribbean Series titles (2011 and 2013). In 2015, Díaz became both the winningest manager in Yaquis history as well as the longest-tenured manager in team history; he also set the league record for the most consecutive seasons managing a single ballclub (8). He returned to manage Venados in 2021. For his tenure with Yaquis, he was inducted into the team hall of fame in 2022.

Díaz was named manager of the United Arab Emirates national baseball team upon its inception in 2024, leading it to a second place finish at the inaugural Baseball United Arab Classic. He currently serves as vice president of baseball operations for Baseball United, an organization promoting baseball in the United Arab Emirates and West Asia.

On 6 December 2025, the Yaquis de Obregón honored Díaz by retiring his number 42.
