= John McLaren (baseball) =

American baseball coach and manager

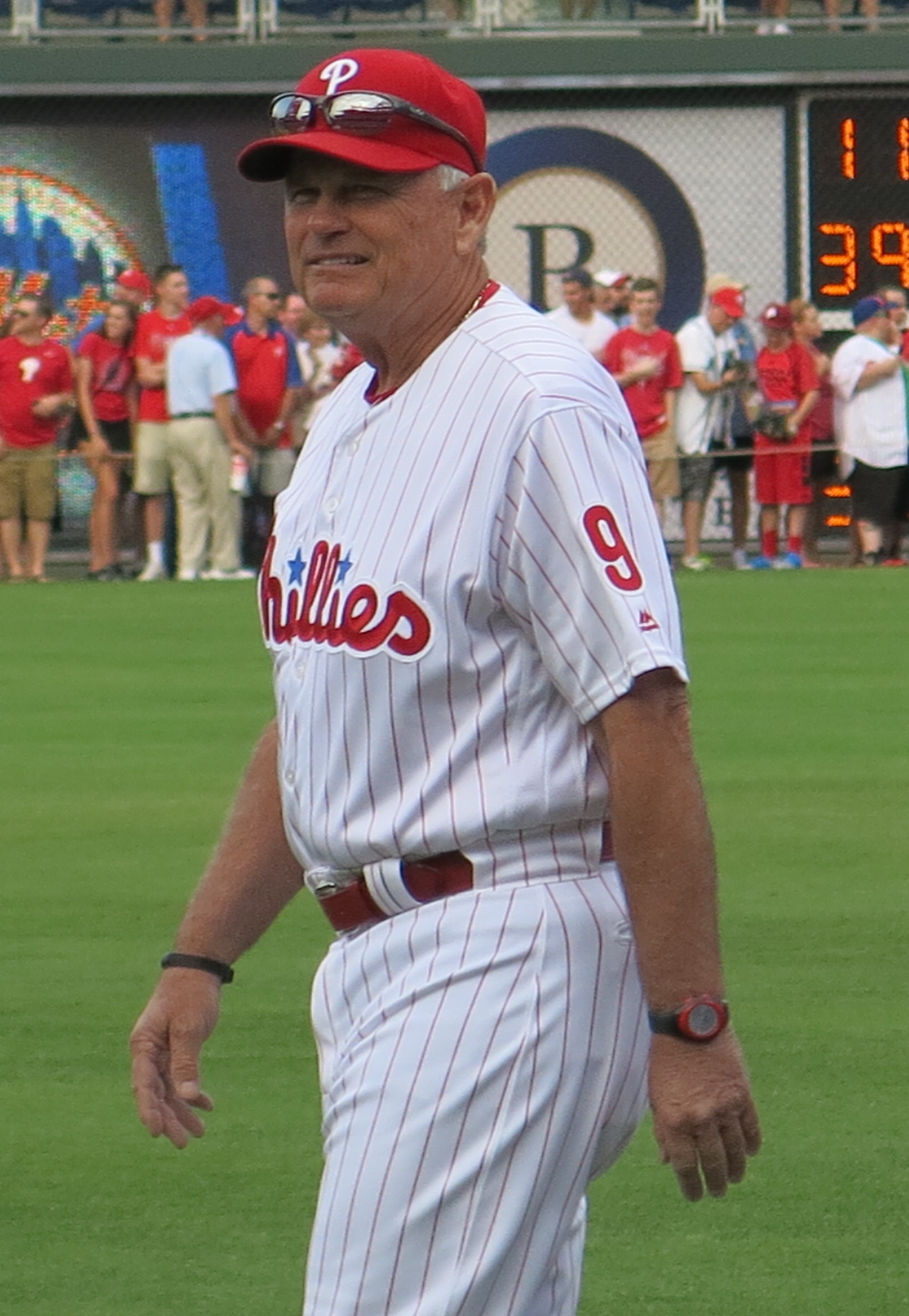
- McLaren with the Phillies in 2016
- Catcher / Manager / Coach
- Born: September 29, 1951 (age 74); Galveston, Texas, U.S.

MLB statistics
- Games managed: 159
- Win–loss record: 75–89
- Winning %: .440
- Stats at Baseball Reference
- Managerial record at Baseball Reference

Teams
- As manager: Seattle Mariners (2007–2008); Washington Nationals (2011); As coach: Toronto Blue Jays (1986–1990); Boston Red Sox (1991); Cincinnati Reds (1992); Seattle Mariners (1993–2002); Tampa Bay Devil Rays (2003–2005); Seattle Mariners (2007); Washington Nationals (2009–2011); Philadelphia Phillies (2016–2017)

John Lowell McLaren (born September 29, 1951) is an American professional baseball coach and manager. He currently serves as manager of the Poland national baseball team and of the Arabia Wolves of Baseball United. McLaren managed the Seattle Mariners for parts of the 2007 to 2008 seasons.

McLaren was a catcher in the Houston Astros minor league system from 1970 to 1976 and later managed in the Toronto Blue Jays organization. He became a major league coach with the Blue Jays in 1986 and has also coached in the majors with the Mariners, Boston Red Sox, Cincinnati Reds, Tampa Bay Devil Rays, and Washington Nationals. He also served as a coach for the United States national team during the 2006 World Baseball Classic.

== Early life ==
McLaren graduated from Westbury High School in Houston in 1970 and attended Blinn College, the University of St. Thomas, and Houston Baptist University.

== Playing career ==
McLaren was selected by the Houston Astros in the seventh round of the 1970 Major League Baseball draft and was assigned to the rookie-level Covington Astros of the Appalachian League.

He led Western Carolinas League catchers in putouts and assists in 1971, and in 1973 at Columbus led Southern League catchers in fielding. His best offensive season came in 1975, when he batted .270 with 13 home runs and 57 runs batted in for the Iowa Oaks and Dubuque Packers. His playing career lasted through the 1976 season, having peaked at the triple-A level.

== Coaching and managing career ==
McLaren began his managerial career in the Toronto Blue Jays organization, managing several minor league affiliates between 1978 and 1985. He entered MLB as the Blue Jays’ third-base coach in 1986 and later served on coaching staffs for the Boston Red Sox, Cincinnati Reds, Seattle Mariners, and Tampa Bay Devil Rays.

In 2007, McLaren was named manager of the Seattle Mariners on July 2, 2007 following the resignation of Mike Hargrove. He managed the club through June 19, 2008, when he was fired. At the time of his firing, the Mariners possessed the worst record in baseball (25–47), despite a payroll in excess of $100 million. His firing followed the firing of general manager Bill Bavasi by three days. Jim Riggleman, the bench coach, replaced McLaren on an interim basis.

McLaren spent the 2009 season as a scout in the Rays organization and in November 2009 was hired as the Washington Nationals' bench coach under manager Riggleman. He became interim manager of the Nationals on June 24, 2011, a day following Riggleman's resignation, and was ejected in his first game as interim manager against the Chicago White Sox; he was replaced with Davey Johnson for the remainder of the 2011 season after McLaren managed three games. McLaren subsequently resigned his coaching position and took a position as a scout for the Nationals organization. He last coached in MLB with the 2017 Philadelphia Phillies.

=== International baseball ===
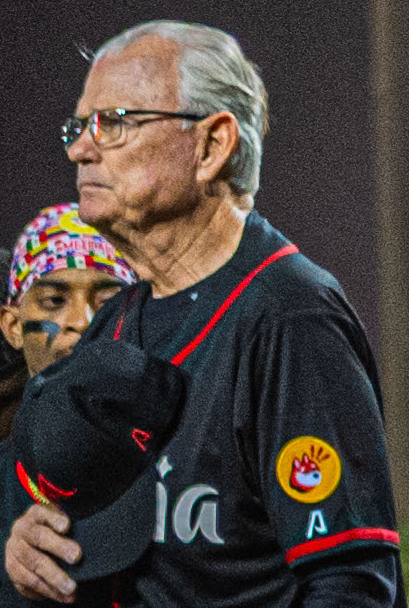
McLaren managing Arabia in 2025

After his MLB career, McLaren has focused on international baseball development. He currently manages the Poland national baseball team and the Arabia Wolves of Baseball United.

During his first two years with Poland, McLaren has witnessed notable growth in the national program and continues to emphasize player development, coaching structure, and exposure to professional training standards. He has expressed a strong commitment to expanding the sport globally and strengthening new and exciting baseball programs.

=== Honors ===
In 1991, McLaren was inducted into the Kinston Professional Baseball Hall of Fame.

=== Managerial record ===
As of September 21, 2015

| Team | From | To | Regular season record | | | Post–season record | | | Ref. |
| Team | From | To | W | L | Win % | W | L | Win % | Ref. |
|---|---|---|---|---|---|---|---|---|---|
| Seattle Mariners | 2007 | 2008 | 68 | 88 | .436 | DNQ | | | |
| Washington Nationals | 2011 | 2011 | 2 | 1 | .667 | DNQ | | | |
| Total | | | 70 | 89 | .440 | 0 | 0 | – | — |

Sporting positions
| Preceded by Pat Corrales | Washington Nationals bench coach 2010–2011 | Succeeded by Pat Corrales |
