= Ed Yarnall =

American baseball player (born 1975)

- Pitcher
- Born: December 4, 1975 (age 50); Lima, Pennsylvania, U.S.
- Batted: Left Threw: Left

Professional debut
- MLB: July 15, 1999, for the New York Yankees
- NPB: April 16, 2001, for the Orix BlueWave

Last appearance
- MLB: July 6, 2000, for the New York Yankees
- NPB: September 17, 2002, for the Orix BlueWave

MLB statistics
- Win–loss record: 1-0
- Earned run average: 5.40
- Strikeouts: 14

NPB statistics
- Win–loss record: 10–16
- Earned run average: 3.71
- Strikeouts: 202
- Stats at Baseball Reference

Teams
- New York Yankees (1999–2000); Orix BlueWave (2001–2002)
Medals
Men's baseball
Representing United States
World Junior Baseball Championship
Silver medal – second place	1992 Monterrey	Team

Harvey Edward Yarnall (born December 4, 1975) is an American former professional baseball pitcher. He pitched parts of two seasons in Major League Baseball with the New York Yankees, and two seasons in Japan with the Orix BlueWave.

== Career ==
Yarnall attended St. Thomas Aquinas High School and Louisiana State University (LSU), where he played college baseball for the LSU Tigers, and was part of their 1996 College World Series championship team. In 1995, he played collegiate summer baseball with the Harwich Mariners of the Cape Cod Baseball League and was named a league all-star.

The New York Mets selected Yarnall in the third round of the 1996 Major League Baseball draft. In 1998, the Mets traded Yarnall with Preston Wilson and minor leaguer Geoff Goetz to the Florida Marlins for Mike Piazza. Prior to the 1999 season, the Marlins traded Yarnall with Mark Johnson and minor leaguer Todd Noel to the New York Yankees for Mike Lowell.

Yarnall made his major league debut with the Yankees in 1999. In 2000, the Yankees traded Yarnall, Jackson Melián, Drew Henson, and Brian Reith to the Cincinnati Reds for Mike Frank and Denny Neagle. Prior to the 2001 season, he was released by the Reds.

Yarnall played two seasons in Japan for the Orix BlueWave in 2001 and 2002. He returned to the United States in 2003, pitching in the minor league organizations of the Oakland Athletics, Boston Red Sox, Philadelphia Phillies, Washington Nationals, and Kansas City Royals. Most recently, he pitched for the independent Long Island Ducks and Mexican League Vaqueros Laguna in 2007.
