= Humberto Sánchez =

Dominican baseball player (born 1983)

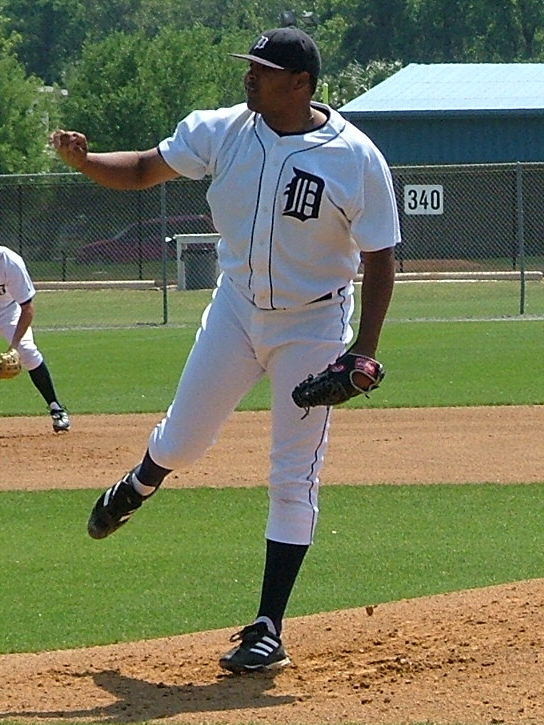
- Sánchez in 2004
- Pitcher
- Born: 28 May 1983 (age 43); Santo Domingo, Dominican Republic
- Batted: Right Threw: Right

MLB debut
- 18 September, 2008, for the New York Yankees

Last MLB appearance
- 25 September, 2008, for the New York Yankees

MLB statistics
- Win–loss record: 0–0
- Earned run average: 4.50
- Strikeouts: 1
- Stats at Baseball Reference

Teams
- New York Yankees (2008)

Humberto A. Sánchez (born 28 May 1983) is a Dominican minor league pitching coach and former professional baseball pitcher in Major League Baseball (MLB). He threw a fastball in the low to mid 90s (90 mph, approximately 145 km/h), as well as a low 90s slider, a curveball, and a changeup.

== Early life and amateur career ==
Sánchez was born in the Dominican Republic and moved to New York City when he was 10 in 1994. He attended South Bronx High School and lived three blocks away from Yankee Stadium. He was selected by the Los Angeles Dodgers in the ninth round of the 2000 MLB draft. Sánchez had expected to be picked as high as the third round and declined the Dodgers' offer of $140,000.

He instead opted to play college baseball at Rockland Community College in Suffern, New York. Sánchez was limited to one inning pitched at Rockland due to elbow issues and underwent a procedure to release pressure from his ulnar nerve. He was selected in the 31st round of the 2001 MLB draft by the Detroit Tigers nonetheless as a "draft and follow" candidate. Sánchez posted an 8–1 record and 1.17 ERA at Connors State College in Oklahoma. He won NJCAA Region II Pitcher of the Year and was named All-American in 2002. Following the season, he signed with the Tigers for a $1 million bonus. In 2016, he was inducted into the Connors State College Athletic Hall of Fame.

== Playing career ==
=== Detroit Tigers ===
After signing, he began his professional career in 2002 in Short Season A-ball with the Oneonta Tigers in the New York-Penn League. He held a 3.62 ERA in nine starts that year. Sánchez reached Low-A in 2003, pitching to a 7–7 record with a 4.42 ERA in 116 innings for the West Michigan Whitecaps. He was named to the Midwest League’s mid-season all-star team.

Sánchez reached High-A in 2004, accumulating a 7–7 record, 5.21 ERA, and 115 strikeouts in 105.1 innings for the Lakeland Tigers. He was a Florida State League mid-season all-star and received a promotion to Double-A at the end of the season. In 2005, Sánchez was named the fifth-best prospect in the Tigers organization by Baseball America. He appeared in 15 games for the Eerie SeaWolves, pitching to a 5.57 ERA in 64.2 innings but oblique and groin injuries cost him a full season. At the end of the year, he pitched for the Mesa Solar Sox in the Arizona Fall League, posting a 1–0 record and 2.15 ERA in six starts.

In 2006, he was named the sixth-best prospect in the Tigers system by Baseball America. Splitting time between Double-A and Triple-A, Sánchez held a 2.63 ERA while striking out 129 batters in 123 innings, though he missed time with elbow soreness. It was the third year in a row in which he struck out at least a batter an inning. He was the starting pitcher for the World Team at the All-Star Futures Game. He also earned International League Pitcher of the Week honors for the week of 18 June.

=== New York Yankees ===
On 10 November 2006, the Tigers traded Sánchez, along with minor league pitchers Anthony Claggett and Kevin Whelan, to the New York Yankees for slugger Gary Sheffield. He was ranked as the 57th best prospect in baseball and the third-best player in the Yankees system, according to Baseball America. Sánchez underwent Tommy John surgery in the spring of 2007, ending his season.

He spent most of 2008 rehabbing from injury, but was called up to the majors on 15 September. Sánchez made his major league debut three days later in relief against the Chicago White Sox. He struck out the first batter he faced. In his only other appearance, he allowed one run on one hit and two walks against the Toronto Blue Jays on 25 September. After the season, Sánchez played for the Peoria Javelinas in the Arizona Fall League.

Sánchez began the 2009 season on the disabled list. He was released by the Yankees on 25 April to make room on the roster for Mark Melancon, but was re-signed to a minor league deal with the organization on 5 May. Sánchez didn't start playing game until June. After the season, he became a minor league free agent.

=== Dominican Republic ===
Sánchez pitched for the Dominican Republic national baseball team during the 2011 Caribbean Series. He appeared in two games, allowing one hit and striking out two in 3.1 innings of work.

=== Sultanes de Monterrey ===
On 18 March 2011, he signed Sultanes de Monterrey of the Mexican League. Sánchez held a 3.45 ERA in 15.2 innings. He was released on 30 April.

=== Leones de Yucatan ===
Sánchez signed with Leones de Yucatán on 1 May 2011. He pitched to a 3.93 ERA in 18.1 innings before being released on 10 June.

=== Camden Riversharks ===
Sánchez spent the 2011 and 2012 seasons with the Camden Riversharks of the independent Atlantic League of Professional Baseball. He was released on 29 June 2012.

== Post-playing career ==
Sánchez retired after the 2013 season and was hired as a pitching coach with IMG Academy in Bradenton, Florida. From 2018 to 2022, he was employed by the Boston Red Sox as a pitching coach for the Dominican Summer League Red Sox.
