= Arabia Wolves =

Emirati professional baseball team

Information
- League: Baseball United
- Location: Dubai, UAE
- Ballpark: Dubai International Stadium
- Established: 2023
- Nickname: Wolves
- Former name: Dubai Wolves (until 2024)
- Colors: Red, black and white
- General manager: Felix Hernandez
- Manager: John McLaren

The Arabia Wolves are a professional baseball team based in Dubai, United Arab Emirates. They are one of four inaugural franchises of Baseball United, a professional baseball league with teams based in the Middle East and South Asia.

== Draft ==
The first Baseball United Draft took place on October 23, 2023, with all four franchises making selections. The draft was a snake-draft format, where the draft order "loops" around (1,2,3,4,4,3,2,1). The Wolves used the 3rd and 6th overall selections in the first round to pick former Major League Baseball infielders Didi Gregorius and Robinson Cano.

The Wolves made 20 selections across the 10 rounds of the draft, 8 pitchers and 12 position players.

=== Dubai Wolves Draft Selections ===
First Round

- 3rd Overall - Didi Gregorius (Infielder)
- 6th Overall - Robinson Cano (Infielder)

Second Round

- 10th Overall - Jair Jurrjens (Pitcher)
- 15th Overall - Courtney Hawkins (Outfielder)

Third Round

- 17th Overall - Dwight Smith Jr. (Outfielder)
- 24th Overall - Wilin Rosario (Catcher)

Fourth Round

- 28th Overall - Dovydas Neverauskas (Pitcher)
- 29th Overall - Reggie McClain (Pitcher)

Fifth Round

- 35th Overall - Connor Panas (Infielder)
- 38th Overall - Brian Schlitter (Pitcher)

Sixth Round

- 42nd Overall - Hernan Perez (Infielder)
- 47th Overall - Alex Katz (Pitcher)

Seventh Round

- 49th Overall - Rudy Martin (Outfielder)
- 56th Overall - L.P. Pellitier (Outfielder)

Eighth Round

- 60th Overall - Christiaan Beyers (Infielder)
- 61st Overall - Todd Van Steensel (Pitcher)

Ninth Round

- 67th Overall - Cameron Gann (Pitcher)
- 70th Overall - Aldrich De Jongh (Outfielder)

Tenth Round

- 74th Overall - Vincent Ahrens (Catcher)
- 79th Overall - Ernest Ohandza (Pitcher)

== Roster ==
Arabia Wolves roster – 2025 Baseball United season
Players		Coaches
Pitchers: 71 (United States) Akeem Bostick; 8 (United States) Angelo Cabral; 68 (Cuba) Wilton Castillo; 15 (Hungary) Sean Fekete; 47 (United States) Alex Katz; 12 (United States) Reese Miller; 10 (Poland) Joey Pence; 6 (United States) Blake Purnell; 22 (United States) Kristian Scott; 54 (United States) Quinn Waterhouse; 13 (Aruba) Gillian Wernet	Catchers: 5 (Germany) Vincent Ahrens; 14 (Mexico) Carlos Garzón; Infielders: 31 (South Africa) Christiaan Beyers; 42 (Argentina) Jacinto Cipriota; 2 (United States) Taylor Darden; 3 (United States) Elliott Good; 72 (Poland) Dominik Grzecicha; Outfielders: 37 (Japan) Shuhei Fukuda; 25 (United States) Noah Marcelo; 23 (United States) Paul Myro; 27 (Canada) Connor Panas; 24 (Mexico) Michael Robles; 1 (Poland) Hubert Zgorzynski	Manager: 7 (United States) John McLaren; Coaches: 41 (United States) Stephen Larkin (first base); 21 (Puerto Rico) Hector Berrios (pitching); 19 (United States) Kash Beauchamp (third base); 11 (Dominican Republic) José Canó (bullpen); Roster updated on 27 September 2025
