= Jorge Vázquez (baseball) =

Mexican baseball player (born 1982)

Rieleros de Aguascalientes
- Designated hitter / First baseman / Coach
- Born: March 15, 1982 (age 44); Culiacán, Sinaloa, Mexico
- Bats: Right Throws: Right
- Stats at Baseball Reference
Medals
Men's baseball
Representing Mexico
Bronze medal – third place	2006 Cartagena	Team

Jorge Alberto Vázquez Andrade (born March 15, 1982), nicknamed El Chato, is a Mexican former professional baseball first baseman who currently serves as a coach for the Rieleros de Aguascalientes of the Mexican League.

Vázquez played in the Mexican League from 1999 through 2008, and played in the minor league system of the New York Yankees from 2009 through 2011. He returned to the Mexican League in 2012. He also played for the Mexico national baseball team at the 2009 World Baseball Classic.

== Playing career ==
=== Tigres de Quintana Roo ===
Vázquez debuted in the Mexican League in 1999 at age 17, going 0-for-4 with two strikeouts for the Tigres de Quintana Roo. In 2000, he hit .244/.396/.319 in 62 games for two Mexican League clubs. He spent 2001 back with the Tigres, hitting .284 with 5 HR and 24 RBI. In 2002, the 20-year-old batted .275 and hit 10 home runs. The next season, he continued to develop, hitting .279 with 14 HR and 60 RBI.

In 2004, Vázquez posted a batting line of .329/.374/.588 for the Tigres in 289 AB, with 21 home runs and 61 runs batted in. He was 6th in the Mexican League in homers. In 2005, when he hit .379/.413/.796. He led the league in slugging, finished second in average and home runs. He was named to the League All-Star team as the best first baseman in the league.

In 2006, Vázquez batted .359/.419/.739 with 31 HR and 98 RBI in just 75 games. He led the league in slugging once more, this time by .023 ahead of Derrick White. He was third in RBI despite having 141 fewer at-bats than the leader and 86 fewer than the runner-up. He was second in homers.

Vázquez batted .323/.383/.605 with 17 HR and 49 RBI in 58 games for the Tigres in 2007, again showing an excellent bat in limited action. He hit .339/.398/.612 for the 2008 Tigres with 59 RBI and 18 homers in 56 games.

=== New York Yankees ===
Vázquez signed with the New York Yankees on December 7, 2008, after he was noticed by the Yankees' director of quantitative analysis. He was assigned to the Double-A Trenton Thunder. In 57 games with Trenton, Vázquez slashed .329/.357/.578 with 13 home runs and 56 RBI. Vázquez was invited to spring training by the Yankees in 2010. After missing the beginning of the 2010 season due to an appendectomy, he was assigned to the Thunder. In 2010, he split the year between Trenton and the Triple-A Scranton/Wilkes-Barre RailRiders, accumulating a .284/.324/.521 with 18 home runs and 68 RBI.

Vázquez was again invited to spring training by the Yankees in 2011, getting noticed for his power. However, his path in the Yankees organization was blocked by corner infielders with better defensive ability. He was named the International League Batter of the Week for weeks ending April 17 and July 31, 2011. He spent the 2011 season with Scranton/Wilkes-Barre, finishing with a .262/.314/.516 with career-highs in home runs (32) and RBI (93). He was invited to Spring Training for the 2012 season, but was released on April 1, 2012.

=== Tigres de Quintana Roo (second stint) ===
Following his stint with the Yankees organization, Vázquez signed with the Tigres de Quintana Roo on April 6, 2012. He finished the season with a .294/.366/.538 slash line. In 2013, he slashed .290/.347/.469 with 10 home runs and 43 RBI. The following year, Vázquez batted .332/.429/.488 with 8 home runs and 48 RBI in 61 games. In 2015, Vázquez appeared in 36 games with the Tigres, posting a batting line of .274/.327/.481 with 8 home runs and 27 RBI. In 2016, Vázquez played in 33 games for the team, logging .319/.403/.513 with 6 home runs and 31 RBI.

=== Diablos Rojos del México ===
On February 28, 2017, Vázquez was traded to the Diablos Rojos del México of the Mexican League in exchange for catcher Gabriel Gutiérrez. In 34 games for the team, he batted .281/.399/.518 with 8 home runs and 24 RBI. On May 26, 2017, Vázquez retired from professional baseball.

=== Generales de Durango ===
Vázquez came out of retirement on April 25, 2018, and signed with the Generales de Durango of the Mexican League. In 48 games with Durango in 2018, Vázquez hit 8 home runs with 27 RBI. He became a free agent after the season.

=== Saraperos de Saltillo ===
On April 4, 2019, Vázquez signed with the Saraperos de Saltillo of the Mexican League. In 2019 with Saltillo, Vázquez slashed .318/.361/.577 with 20 home runs and 68 RBI. Vázquez did not play in a game in 2020 due to the cancellation of the Mexican League season because of the COVID-19 pandemic. On September 14, 2020, Vázquez was released by the team.

=== Rieleros de Aguascalientes ===
On May 20, 2021, Vázquez signed with the Rieleros de Aguascalientes of the Mexican League. After hitting .214/.214/.310 in 11 games for the club, he was released on June 16.

=== Toros de Tijuana ===
On June 26, 2021, Vázquez signed with the Toros de Tijuana of the Mexican League. Vázquez went 1-for-12 in 5 games with Tijuana before he was released on July 13.

=== Saraperos de Saltillo (second stint) ===
On July 22, 2021, Vázquez signed with the Saraperos de Saltillo of the Mexican League. He retired for the second time following the season.

== Coaching career ==
On February 1, 2022, Vázquez was hired by El Águila de Veracruz to serve as the team's hitting coach for the 2022 season.

On May 17, 2024, Vázquez was hired as part of the staff for the Toros de Tijuana. On December 26, he was removed from Tijuana's staff.

Vázquez joined the coaching staff of the Caliente de Durango prior to the 2026 season. On July 8, 2026, Vázquez was fired by Durango.

On July 10, 2026, Vázquez was hired to serve as a coach for the Rieleros de Aguascalientes of the Mexican League.

== International career ==
In the 2006 Americas qualifier for the 2008 Olympics, he hit .323/.353/.742 for Mexico with 4 HR and 7 RBI in 9 games; he was their main DH. Mexico failed to qualify for the Olympics but did earn a spot in the 2008 Final Olympic Qualification Tournament. In the 2006 qualifying event, Vázquez tied for the home run lead.

He was on Mexico's roster for the 2007 Pan American Games but did not play as his team won a Bronze Medal. He participated in the 2009 World Baseball Classic as Mexico's DH, hitting .294/.368/.529 with 5 runs and 5 RBI in 5 games, tying for second on the team in runs (one behind Adrián González). He hit a grand slam to put Mexico ahead 5-3 in a 17-7 win over Australia off Craig Anderson.

Vázquez was named Most Valuable Player in the 2011 Caribbean Series.
