= Mike Frank =

American baseball player (born 1975)

- Centerfielder
- Born: January 14, 1975 (age 51); Pomona, California, U.S.
- Batted: Left Threw: Left

MLB debut
- June 19, 1998, for the Cincinnati Reds

Last MLB appearance
- July 26, 1998, for the Cincinnati Reds

MLB statistics
- Batting average: .225
- Home runs: 0
- RBIs: 7
- Stats at Baseball Reference

Teams
- Cincinnati Reds (1998)

Stephen Michael Frank (born January 14, 1975) is an American former Major League Baseball outfielder who played for the Cincinnati Reds in 1998.

== Biography ==
Frank was born in Pomona, California and graduated from Escondido High School in (Escondido, California. He played college baseball at Santa Clara University. In 1994, he played collegiate summer baseball with the Bourne Braves of the Cape Cod Baseball League and returned to the league in 1995 to play for the Wareham Gatemen.

Frank was drafted by the Cincinnati Reds in the 7th round of the 1997 Major League Baseball draft, and made his major league debut on June 19, 1998. In 2000, he was traded to the New York Yankees with Denny Neagle for Jackson Melián, Drew Henson, Brian Reith and Ed Yarnall.
