= Gabriel Gutiérrez =

Mexican baseball player (born 1995)

Diablos Rojos del México – No. 70
- Catcher
- Born: 24 November 1983 (age 42); Estación Bamoa, Sinaloa, Mexico
- Bats: Right Throws: Right

Gabriel Alejandro Gutiérrez Beltrán (born 24 November 1983) is a Mexican professional baseball catcher for the Diablos Rojos del México of the Mexican League. Gutiérrez began his professional baseball career in 2005 when he signed with the Los Angeles Dodgers organization. After spending six seasons in the Dodgers' minor league system, he elected free agency following the 2010 season. He has since played in both the Mexican League and the Mexican Pacific League.

Gutiérrez was Fernando Valenzuela's final catcher in professional baseball, serving behind the plate for the Águilas de Mexicali during Valenzuela's final professional appearance on 8 November 2007.

== Early life ==
Gutiérrez was born on 24 November 1983 in Estación Bamoa in the Guasave Municipality, Sinaloa.

== Professional career ==
=== Los Angeles Dodgers ===
Gutiérrez signed with the Los Angeles Dodgers organization in 2005. He spent the 2005 season with the Columbus Catfish of the Single-A South Atlantic League and the Las Vegas 51s of the Triple-A Pacific Coast League.

In 2006, Gutiérrez played for the Vero Beach Dodgers of the Class A-Advanced Florida State League before being promoted to the Jacksonville Suns of the Double-A Southern League. He returned to Class A-Advanced with the Inland Empire 66ers of the California League in 2007 and 2008, also appearing for Jacksonville later in the 2008 season.

=== Petroleros de Minatitlán ===
Gutiérrez made his Mexican League debut in 2009 with the Petroleros de Minatitlán, he appeared in 24 games, recording a .237/.301/.329 hitting line.

=== Vaqueros Laguna ===
On 19 May 2009, Gutiérrez signed with Vaqueros Laguna of the Mexican League. He appeared in 16 games, slashing .383/.456/.583. On 19 June 2009, he was loaned to the Chattanooga Lookouts of the Southern League.

=== Los Angeles Dodgers (second stint) ===
In 2009, he played for the Chattanooga Lookouts of the Double-A Southern League. He made 57 appearances for the team, recording a .267/.347/.378 batting line. He elected free agency on 9 November 2009. On 8 February 2010, he re-signed with the Dodgers and was invited to spring training.

=== Diablos Rojos del México ===
On 6 April 2010, Gutiérrez joined the Diablos Rojos del México of the Mexican League. He appeared in 41 games, slashing .283/.392/.406.

=== Los Angeles Dodgers (third stint) ===
On 26 August 2010, Gutiérrez re-joined the Los Angeles Dodgers organization and was assigned to the Inland Empire 66ers for the 2010 season, appearing in only five games, recording a .368/.429/.421 hitting line, before electing free agency on 6 November 2010.

=== Diablos Rojos del México (second stint) ===
Gutiérrez joined the Diablos Rojos del México of the Mexican League ahead of the 2011 season. He spent five seasons with the club from 2011 to 2015, appearing in 293 games as the team's catcher. In 2014, he batted .356, leading the league with 33 doubles and helping the Diablos Rojos win the league championship.

Gutiérrez suffered a knee injury during the 2015 season that limited his playing time and caused him to miss the entire 2016 season. On 28 February 2017, he was traded to Tigres de Quintana Roo in exchange for designated hitter Jorge Vázquez, although he never appeared in a game for the Tigres.

=== Toros de Tijuana ===
On 7 March 2017, Gutiérrez was traded to the Toros de Tijuana in exchange for pitcher José Meraz. He spent five seasons with the club from 2017 to 2021, appearing in 196 games as a catcher. He helped the Toros win Mexican League championships in 2017 and 2021, although the 2020 season was cancelled due to the COVID-19 pandemic.

=== Pericos de Puebla ===
On 26 March 2022, Gutiérrez was traded from the Olmecas de Tabasco to the Pericos de Puebla in exchange for catcher Isidro Piña and pitcher Óscar Hurtado. He appeared in 127 games as a catcher over the 2022 and 2023 seasons, helping the Pericos win the 2023 Mexican League championship. On 26 February 2024, he was released by the club.

=== Diablos Rojos del México (third stint) ===
Gutiérrez joined the Diablos Rojos del México for a third stint, ahead of the 2024 season. He appeared in 27 games, recording a .213/.314/.320 batting line. In 2025, he appeared in only five games, slashing .250/.308/.500.

=== Mexican Pacific League ===
Gutiérrez made his Mexican Pacific League debut during the 2005–06 season with the Algodoneros de Guasave, appearing in three games as a substitute for Noé Muñoz. He again served as Muñoz's backup during the 2006–07 season, appearing in just one game.

Gutiérrez joined Águilas de Mexicali for the 2007–08 season. On 8 November 2007, he served as Fernando Valenzuela's catcher in the pitcher's final professional appearance, becoming Valenzuela's final catcher in professional baseball. He returned to Algodoneros de Guasave, where he played from the 2009–10 through the 2013–14 seasons.

Gutiérrez then spent seven seasons with Charros de Jalisco from 2014–15 to 2020–21, helping the club win the Mexican Pacific League championship during the 2018–19 season. He later played for Yaquis de Obregón in 2021–22, Venados de Mazatlán in 2022–23, returned to Yaquis de Obregón for the 2024–25 season, and joined Naranjeros de Hermosillo for the 2025–26 season.
