= Joe Gunkel =

American baseball player (born 1991)

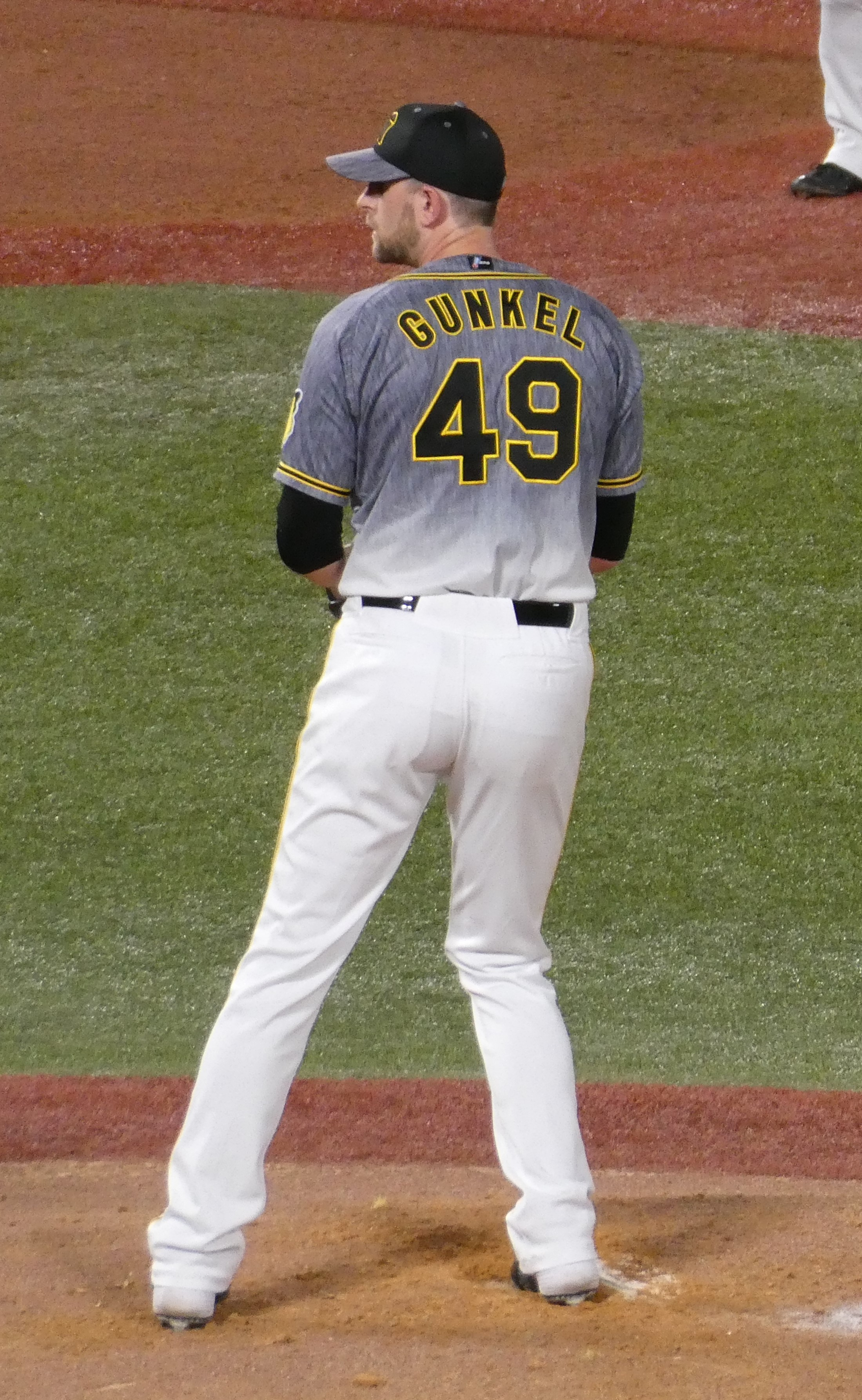
- Gunkel with the Hanshin Tigers
- Pitcher
- Born: December 30, 1991 (age 34); Boynton Beach, Florida, U.S.
- Batted: Right Threw: Right

NPB debut
- June 24, 2020, for the Hanshin Tigers

Last NPB appearance
- June 16, 2023, for the Fukuoka SoftBank Hawks

NPB statistics
- Win–loss record: 16-13
- Earned run average: 3.10
- Strikeouts: 189

Teams
- Hanshin Tigers (2020–2022); Fukuoka SoftBank Hawks (2023)

Joseph Dillon Gunkel (born December 30, 1991) is an American former professional baseball pitcher. He played in Nippon Professional Baseball (NPB) for the Hanshin Tigers and Fukuoka SoftBank Hawks.

== Career ==
=== Boston Red Sox ===
The Boston Red Sox chose Gunkel in the 18th round in the 2013 Major League Baseball draft. He signed with the club on June 19, 2013. He was assigned to the Gulf Coast League Red Sox to begin his professional career. On July 6, he was assigned to the Lowell Spinners. Gunkel began the 2014 season with the Greenville Drive, and would later be assigned to the Salem Red Sox. In May 2015, Gunkel moved from Salem and started play with the Portland Sea Dogs.

=== Baltimore Orioles ===
On June 3, 2015, Gunkel was traded to the Baltimore Orioles in exchange for Alejandro De Aza. In 17 starts for the Double-A Bowie Baysox down the stretch, he logged an 8-4 record and 2.59 ERA with 69 strikeouts across 104 1/3 innings pitched.

Gunkel split the 2016 season between Bowie and the Triple-A Norfolk Tides, accumulating an 8-14 record and 4.02 ERA with 109 strikeouts in 161 innings pitched across 28 total starts. On November 18, 2016, the Orioles added Gunkel to their 40-man roster to protect him from the Rule 5 draft. Gunkel was designated for assignment by the Orioles on April 7, 2017, following the acquisition of Miguel Castro.

=== Los Angeles Dodgers ===
On April 10, 2017, Gunkel was traded to the Los Angeles Dodgers in exchange for a player to be named later. He was assigned to the Oklahoma City Dodgers after being claimed. On April 25, Gunkel was designated for assignment after pitching to a 4.00 ERA and allowing 5 runs in 9 innings pitched after appearing in only three Triple-A games for the Dodgers organization.

=== Miami Marlins ===
On April 27, 2017, Gunkel was claimed off waivers by the Miami Marlins and was assigned to the Jacksonville Jumbo Shrimp two days later. On May 10, Gunkel was designated for assignment for the third time in 2017. He went unclaimed this time, and was sent outright to the Jumbo Shrimp on May 12. He would spend the rest of the season with the Jumbo Shrimp and the New Orleans Baby Cakes. Gunkel was assigned to the Baby Cakes to begin the 2018 season and spent the entirety of the season with them, pitching to a 3.03 ERA and allowed 23 runs on 63 hits in 22 appearances.

Gunkel spent the 2019 season with New Orleans, also appearing making two scoreless appearances for the High–A Jupiter Hammerheads. In 21 games (15 starts) for the Baby Cakes, he compiled an 8–2 record and 3.20 ERA with 61 strikeouts across 87 2/3 innings pitched. Gunkel elected free agency following the season on November 4, 2019.

=== Hanshin Tigers ===
On December 15, 2019, Gunkel signed with the Hanshin Tigers of the Nippon Professional Baseball. He made his NPB debut on June 24 for the Tigers and pitched 4 innings, giving up 3 runs on 7 hits. In 28 appearances during his rookie campaign, Gunkel posted a 2-4 record and 3.18 ERA with 39 strikeouts across 56 2/3 innings pitched.

Gunkel pitched in 20 games for the Tigers in 2021, compiling a 9-3 record and 2.95 ERA with 87 strikeouts across 113 innings pitched. Gunkel made 5 appearances for Hanshin during the 2022 campaign, struggling to an 0-1 record and 5.82 ERA with 11 strikeouts over 17 innings pitched. He became a free agent following the season.

=== Fukuoka SoftBank Hawks ===
On December 21, 2022, Gunkel signed with the Fukuoka SoftBank Hawks of Nippon Professional Baseball. In 2023, he made 5 appearances for the Hawks, logging a 5.82 ERA with 11 strikeouts in 17 innings of work. On December 4, the Hawks announced that Gunkel would not be returning to the team, making him a free agent.

=== Minnesota Twins ===
On January 31, 2024, Gunkel signed a minor league contract with the Minnesota Twins. In 9 games (7 starts) for the Triple–A St. Paul Saints, he struggled to an 0–5 record and 10.54 ERA with 11 strikeouts across 27 1/3 innings pitched. On May 27, Gunkel was released by the Twins organization.
