= Akeem Bostick =

American baseball player (born 1995)

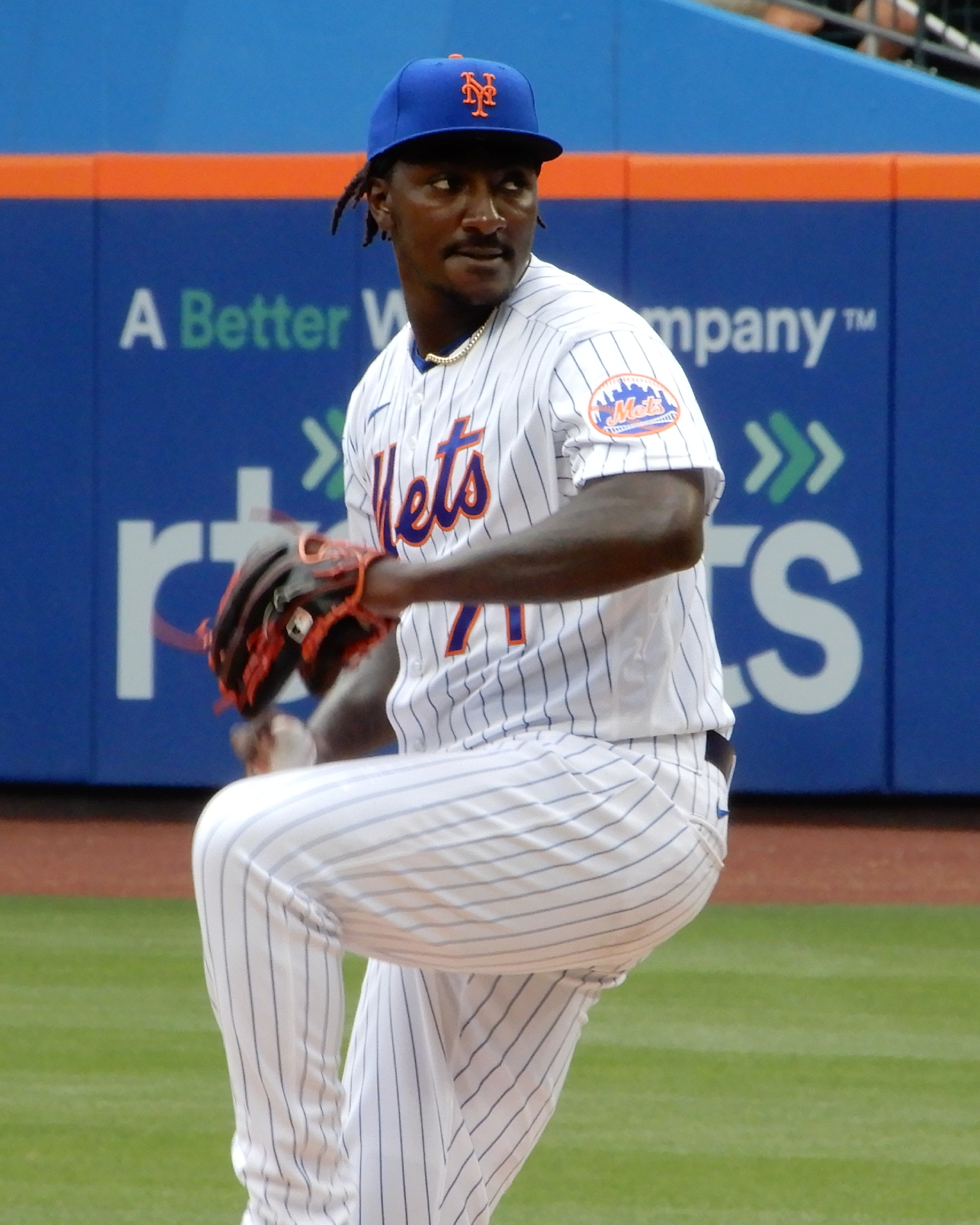
- Bostick with the New York Mets
- Pitcher
- Born: May 4, 1995 (age 31); Florence, South Carolina, U.S.
- Bats: Right Throws: Right

MLB debut
- July 29, 2021, for the New York Mets

MLB statistics (through 2021 season)
- Win–loss record: 0–0
- Earned run average: 0.00
- Strikeouts: 0
- Stats at Baseball Reference

Teams
- New York Mets (2021)

Akeem Maurice Bostick (born May 4, 1995) is an American former professional baseball pitcher. He was chosen by the Texas Rangers in the second round of the 2013 MLB draft, and made his Major League Baseball (MLB) debut with the New York Mets in 2021.

== Career ==
=== Amateur career ===
Bostick attended West Florence High School in Florence, South Carolina. Bostick played for the school's baseball team, and was their ace pitcher. In his senior year, Bostick had a 9–0 win–loss record and a 0.68 earned run average (ERA) with 84 strikeouts in 51 innings pitched. Bostick pitched for Florence Post 1 in American Legion Baseball, helping them to win the state championship in 2012.

=== Texas Rangers ===
Bostick committed to attend Georgia Southern University, where he would play baseball and American football. The Texas Rangers selected Bostick in the second round, 62nd overall, of the 2013 MLB draft. He signed with the Rangers rather than attend college, reportedly receiving a $520,620 signing bonus. The Rangers assigned him to the Arizona Rangers of the Rookie-level Arizona League and he spent the whole season there, posting a 4–1 record and 2.83 ERA in 14 games. In 2014, Bostick pitched for the Hickory Crawdads of the Single-A South Atlantic League where he posted a 5–6 record and 5.17 ERA in 21 games (twenty games started).

=== Houston Astros ===
On January 21, 2015, the Rangers traded Bostick to the Houston Astros for Carlos Corporán. He spent the 2015 season with both the Single-A Quad Cities River Bandits and the High-A Lancaster JetHawks, posting a combined 9–5 record and 4.15 ERA in 21 total games between the two teams. The following year, Bostick played with the Low-A Tri-City ValleyCats and Lancaster, where he went 6–4 with a 4.74 ERA in 16 total games. In 2017, he pitched for the High-A Buies Creek Astros and the Double-A Corpus Christi Hooks, pitching to a combined 8–7 record and 4.06 ERA in 22 games (16 starts) between both teams. In 2018, he played for Corpus Christi and the Triple-A Fresno Grizzlies, going 2–5 with a 3.67 ERA in 22 games (16 starts). In 2019, Bostick pitched for the Triple-A Round Rock Express, recording a 4–5 record and 7.28 ERA in 21 games before he was released on August 9, 2019.

=== Kansas City T-Bones ===
On August 16, 2019, Bostick signed with the Kansas City T-Bones of the American Association of Independent Professional Baseball. In 4 games for Kansas City, Bostick posted a 2–1 record and 3.12 ERA with 17 strikeouts in 17.1 innings of work. On June 16, 2020, Bostick became a free agent after the T-Bones decided not to participate in the 2020 season.

=== Sugar Land Skeeters ===
In July 2020, Bostick signed on to play for the Sugar Land Skeeters of the Constellation Energy League (a makeshift four-team independent league created as a result of the COVID-19 pandemic) for the 2020 season. In 8 games with the Skeeters, Bostick registered an 0.90 ERA with 11 strikeouts in 10.0 innings pitched.

=== St. Louis Cardinals ===
On September 1, 2020, Bostick signed a minor league contract with the St. Louis Cardinals organization. Bostick did not play in a game for the organization in 2020 due to the cancellation of the minor league season because of the COVID-19 pandemic. On March 30, 2021, Bostick was released by St. Louis.

=== New York Mets ===
On May 18, 2021, Bostick signed a minor league contract with the New York Mets organization. He was assigned to the Triple-A Syracuse Mets and pitched to an 0–4 record and 6.21 ERA in 10 games with the team. On July 28, the Mets selected Bostick's contract to the 40-man roster and promoted him to the major leagues for the first time. He made his major league debut on July 29, 2021, pitching a scoreless ninth inning against the Atlanta Braves, retiring three of the batters he faced, walking one. On July 30, Bostick was designated for assignment by the Mets. The next day, he was outrighted back to Triple-A Syracuse.

=== Kansas City Monarchs ===
On January 24, 2022, Bostick signed with the Kansas City Monarchs of the American Association.

=== Wild Health Genomes ===
On June 17, 2022, Bostick signed with the Wild Health Genomes of the Atlantic League of Professional Baseball. Bostick made 19 appearances for the Genomes down the stretch, posting a 1–2 record and 4.97 ERA with 22 strikeouts and 2 saves in 25.1 innings pitched. He became a free agent after the season.

=== Sioux Falls Canaries ===
On May 2, 2023, Bostick signed with the Sioux Falls Canaries of the American Association of Professional Baseball. In 15 starts for the team, he logged a 4.65 ERA with 50 strikeouts across 81 1/3 innings pitched. In addition, Bostick was named an All–Star for the Canaries during the season. After the 2023 season, he became a free agent.

=== Arabia Wolves ===
In October 2025, Bostick signed with the Arabia Wolves of Baseball United.

== Personal life ==
His cousin, Brandon Bostick, played in the National Football League.
