= Christiaan Beyers (baseball) =

South African baseball player

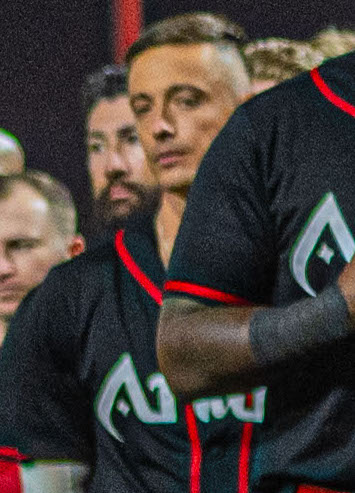
- Beyers with the Arabia Wolves in 2025

Free agent
- Infielder
- Born: 17 May 1995 (age 30); Secunda, South Africa
- Bats: Right Throws: Right
Medals
Men's baseball
Representing United Arab Emirates
Arab Classic
Silver medal – second place	2024 Dubai	Team

Christiaan Beyers (born 17 May 1995) is a South African-born professional baseball player. He plays for the Arabia Wolves of Baseball United, having previously played for the Bonn Capitals and Paderborn Untouchables. In international competition, Beyers has played for both the South Africa and United Arab Emirates national baseball teams.

== Early life ==
Beyers was born in Secunda, South Africa. At the age of four, his family relocated to Saudi Arabia, where his father worked for Saudi Aramco. In Saudi Arabia, Beyers was introduced to baseball by one of his father's American friends enticed him to a practice. He played on the Dhahran team that made it to the Little League World Series in 2007 and 2008. In the 2008 edition, he was the sole hit in a 1–0 loss to Japan.

Beyers briefly attended a private school in Mercersburg, Pennsylvania but eventually returned to Saudi Arabia to finish high school; he later earned a degree in business management at Stellenbosch University in South Africa. Beyers briefly played baseball with the Fighting Artichokes of Scottsdale Community College in Arizona, trying to make the team as a non-scholarship player.

== Professional career ==
Beyers signed with the Paderborn Untouchables in 2021; in his first season, he slashed .340/.444/.528. In 2022, he batted .407 with a .478 on-base percentage and .559 slugging percentage as Paderborn reached the championship, ultimately losing to the Bonn Capitals. In 2023, Beyers batted .412, being voted Best Batter in the Bundesliga's North Division; that year, he led the league in total bases (67) and finished second in home runs (6) and in OPS (1.163). At the 2023 European Champions Cup, Beyers went 6-for-16 with a home run and 3 runs batted in. While with Paderborn, he wore uniform number 31.

Beyers was selected by the Dubai Wolves with the 60th overall pick in the Baseball United inaugural draft.

On February 16, 2025, the Bonn Capitals announced they had signed Beyers for the 2025 season.

== International career ==
In 2022, Beyers was named to the South Africa national baseball team roster for the 2023 World Baseball Classic qualifiers. In two games, he went 0-for-6 at the plate, with two strikeouts and one walk.

Beyers, a resident of Dubai, played with the United Arab Emirates national baseball team at the Baseball United Arab Classic in 2024. He recorded the UAE's first-ever baseball hit. He also recorded the team's second-ever home run, in a semifinal win against Palestine. He was named to the Arab Classic all-star team at the conclusion of the tournament, in which the UAE finished in second.

Despite his participation with the Emirati team in the Arab Classic, Beyers was named to the South African national team roster for the 2026 World Baseball Classic qualifiers, set to be held in Taipei, Taiwan. Beyers went hitless in three at-bats.

== Personal life ==
Beyers was engaged, but recently called it off with his bride to be, Gitana; a flight attendant for the airline Emirates originally from Brazil.
