= Denny Neagle =

American baseball player (born 1968)

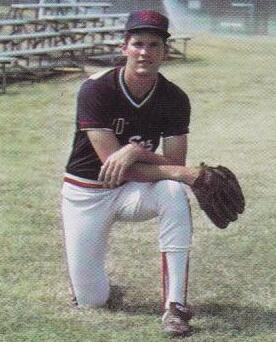
- Neagle with the Yarmouth-Dennis Red Sox in 1988
- Pitcher
- Born: September 13, 1968 (age 58); Gambrills, Maryland, U.S.
- Batted: Left Threw: Left

MLB debut
- July 27, 1991, for the Minnesota Twins

Last MLB appearance
- July 20, 2003, for the Colorado Rockies

MLB statistics
- Win–loss record: 124–92
- Earned run average: 4.24
- Strikeouts: 1,415
- Stats at Baseball Reference

Teams
- Minnesota Twins (1991); Pittsburgh Pirates (1992–1996); Atlanta Braves (1996–1998); Cincinnati Reds (1999–2000); New York Yankees (2000); Colorado Rockies (2001–2003)

Career highlights and awards
- 2× All-Star (1995, 1997); World Series champion (2000); NL wins leader (1997)

Dennis Edward Neagle Jr. (/ˈneɪɡəl/; born September 13, 1968) is an American former professional baseball player. He played in Major League Baseball (MLB) as a left-handed pitcher from 1991 to 2003 for six teams over a 13-year span. A two-time All-Star, Neagle was the 1997 National League wins leader while with the Atlanta Braves and, won a World Series with the New York Yankees in 2000. From 1995-1998, Neagle was one of the top pitchers in baseball, but his career and personal life deteriorated in the early 2000s.

== Amateur career ==
Neagle attended Arundel Senior High School in Gambrills, Maryland and played on the baseball team.

Neagle attended the University of Minnesota and played on the baseball team. In 1988, he played collegiate summer baseball in the Cape Cod Baseball League for the Yarmouth-Dennis Red Sox.

== Professional career ==
=== Minnesota Twins ===
Neagle was drafted in the 3rd round of the 1989 amateur draft by the Minnesota Twins. He saw some action in the summer of 1991 for the Twins, but was not on their postseason roster when the club won the 1991 World Series.

=== Pittsburgh Pirates ===
Neagle was dealt to the Pittsburgh Pirates during spring training in 1992, and became a full-time starter for the Pirates in 1994. The following season, Neagle posted a 13–8 record with a 3.43 ERA and became the ace of a mediocre Pittsburgh staff. That year, Neagle represented the Pirates at the All-Star Game and led the National League in innings pitched (209 2/3) and hits allowed (221). He got off to an impressive 14–6 start in 1996. On August 27, 1996, he pitched eight innings giving up only two runs to the first place Atlanta Braves. The next day, the Braves traded a young Jason Schmidt to Pittsburgh for Neagle in the midst of their playoff run.

=== Atlanta Braves ===
Neagle was given the opportunity to start in Game 4 of the 1996 World Series, earning a no-decision.

Remaining with the Braves in 1997, Neagle had his best season, going 20–5 with a 2.97 ERA. Neagle made the start for the Braves in the first regular season game at Turner Field, taking place on April 4, 1997. He earned another All-Star selection and finished third in Cy Young Award voting. In Game 4 of the 1997 National League Championship Series, Neagle pitched a complete-game shutout.

Neagle's 16–11 record and 3.55 ERA in 1998 were still solid numbers, but the emergence of Kevin Millwood made him expendable and he was traded to the Cincinnati Reds after the season.

=== Cincinnati Reds ===
Injuries limited Neagle to 19 starts in 1999, but he stormed out to an 8–2 record in 2000.

=== New York Yankees ===
The playoff-bound New York Yankees traded prospects Drew Henson, Jackson Melián and Ed Yarnall to acquire Neagle along with outfielder Mike Frank on July 12, 2000. He only registered a 7–7 record over the rest of the season with the Yankees, and his playoff performance was shaky, but his team triumphed in the 2000 World Series and Neagle earned a World Series ring.

=== Colorado Rockies, Tampa Bay Devil Rays and legal troubles ===
In December 2000, the Colorado Rockies signed Neagle and fellow left-hander Mike Hampton to expensive contracts. Neagle's contract was for five years and $51 million, and his 17–19 record and 5.31 ERA over the 2001 and 2002 seasons spelled disaster for the Rockies. Due to injuries, Neagle only started seven games in 2003. He went 2–4 with a 7.90 ERA, pitching what was to be his last Major League game on July 20, 2003.

Neagle missed the 2004 season due to ligament and elbow surgeries. Then, in late November 2004, a Lakewood, Colorado, police officer ticketed him for soliciting a woman for oral sex. Less than a week later, the Rockies canceled the final year of his lucrative contract, citing a morals clause in his contract. The incident ultimately led to the end of Neagle's marriage.

He signed with the Tampa Bay Devil Rays before the 2005 season, but did not play due to injury.

== Personal life ==
Denny Neagle was born and raised in the Annapolis, Maryland, suburb of Gambrills to Denny Sr. and Joanne Neagle. He has two sisters and a brother. He graduated from Arundel High School.

Neagle married hairstylist Jennifer Gray in 1996. They have three children. Neagle and Gray divorced in 2006 after his court case.

On January 24, 2006, Neagle pleaded guilty in Jefferson County, Colorado, on one charge of patronizing a prostitute. Although the sentence can carry a maximum of a $500 fine and up to six months in jail, Neagle was sentenced to 40 hours of community service.

On August 27, 2007, Neagle was arrested for and later pleaded guilty to driving under the influence.

On December 13, 2007, Neagle was mentioned in the Mitchell Report in connection with steroids.

In 2012, he sued his financial adviser, William S. Leavitt, for placing 80% of his money in “alternative investments” without his consent. These investments incurred huge losses.

== See also ==
- List of Major League Baseball annual wins leaders
- List of Major League Baseball players named in the Mitchell Report
