= Juan Padilla (pitcher) =

Puerto Rican baseball player (born 1977)

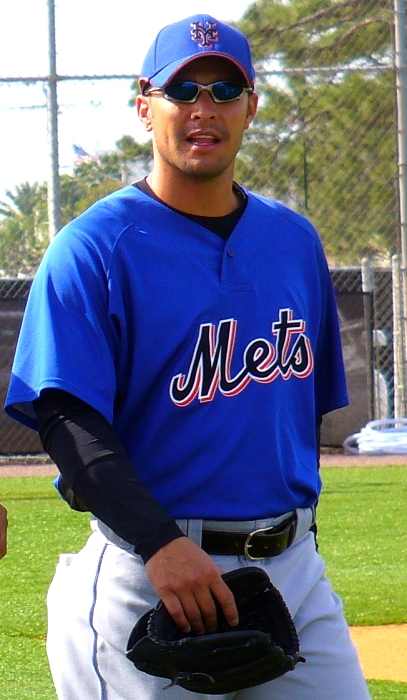
- Pitcher
- Born: February 17, 1977 (age 49); Río Piedras, Puerto Rico
- Batted: Right Threw: Right

MLB debut
- July 16, 2004, for the New York Yankees

Last MLB appearance
- October 1, 2005, for the New York Mets

MLB statistics
- Win–loss record: 4–1
- Earned run average: 4.06
- Strikeouts: 34
- Stats at Baseball Reference

Teams
- New York Yankees (2004); Cincinnati Reds (2004); New York Mets (2005)

Juan Miguel Padilla (born February 17, 1977) is a Puerto Rican former Major League Baseball (MLB) relief pitcher.

== Amateur career ==
Despite being taught barely any English in high school, he enrolled at Tallahassee Community College to begin his college baseball career. He later transferred to Jacksonville University.

== Major league career ==
Padilla was a 24th round draft pick of the Minnesota Twins. He spent six seasons in the Twins' minor league system before breaking into the majors with the New York Yankees and Cincinnati Reds in 2004. Although not highly successful with either team, he was signed by the New York Mets and responded with a 1.49 earned run average in the second half of 2005. Padilla had Tommy John surgery in March 2006 and had to miss the 2006 season.

Padilla was not offered a new contract by the Mets and became a free agent on December 12, 2007. He was later signed to a minor-league contract and given a non-roster invitation to spring training by the Mets. In July 2008, Padilla was released by the Mets.

== Independent ball ==
Padilla signed with the York Revolution of the independent Atlantic League of Professional Baseball on July 26, 2008. Padilla did not return for the 2009 season. Padilla has also played for the Pittsfield Colonials in 2010.

He last played professionally in 2011 for the Bridgeport Bluefish and Leones de Yucatán.
