= United Arab Emirates national baseball team =

Emirati national baseball team

Information
- Country: United Arab Emirates
- Federation: Emirates Cricket Board
- Manager: Eddie Díaz

WBSC ranking
- Current: NR (26 October 2026)

The United Arab Emirates national baseball team represents the United Arab Emirates in international baseball competition. The team was established in 2024, under the auspices of the Emirates Cricket Board (which oversees cricket, the more popular bat-and-ball sport in the country), in cooperation with Baseball United. The team is largely made up of Western expatriates living in the United Arab Emirates, including members of the Dubai Little League, similar to how the Emirati national cricket team is largely made up of South Asian expatriates.

== Current roster ==
United Arab Emirates roster – 2024 Baseball United Arab Classic
Players		Coaches
Pitchers: 15 Sean Fekete; 99 Claudio Gomez; 21 Lorenzo Riddle	Catchers: 28 Noah McFadzean; 11 Gabriel Reque; Infielders: 31 Chris Beyers; 12 Zach Swartz; 55 Jose Acosta; 13 Bobby Fiala; — Alejandro Perez; 2 Filip Smola; Outfielders: 24 Mike Casals; 17 Ryan Kabbara	Manager: 42 Eddie Díaz

== Competitive record ==
=== Arab Classic ===
Arab Classic record
Year	Round	Position	W	L	%	RS	RA
(United Arab Emirates) 2024	Gold Medal Game	(silver) 2nd	5	2	.714	50	27
