= Alejandro De Aza =

Dominican baseball player (born 1984)

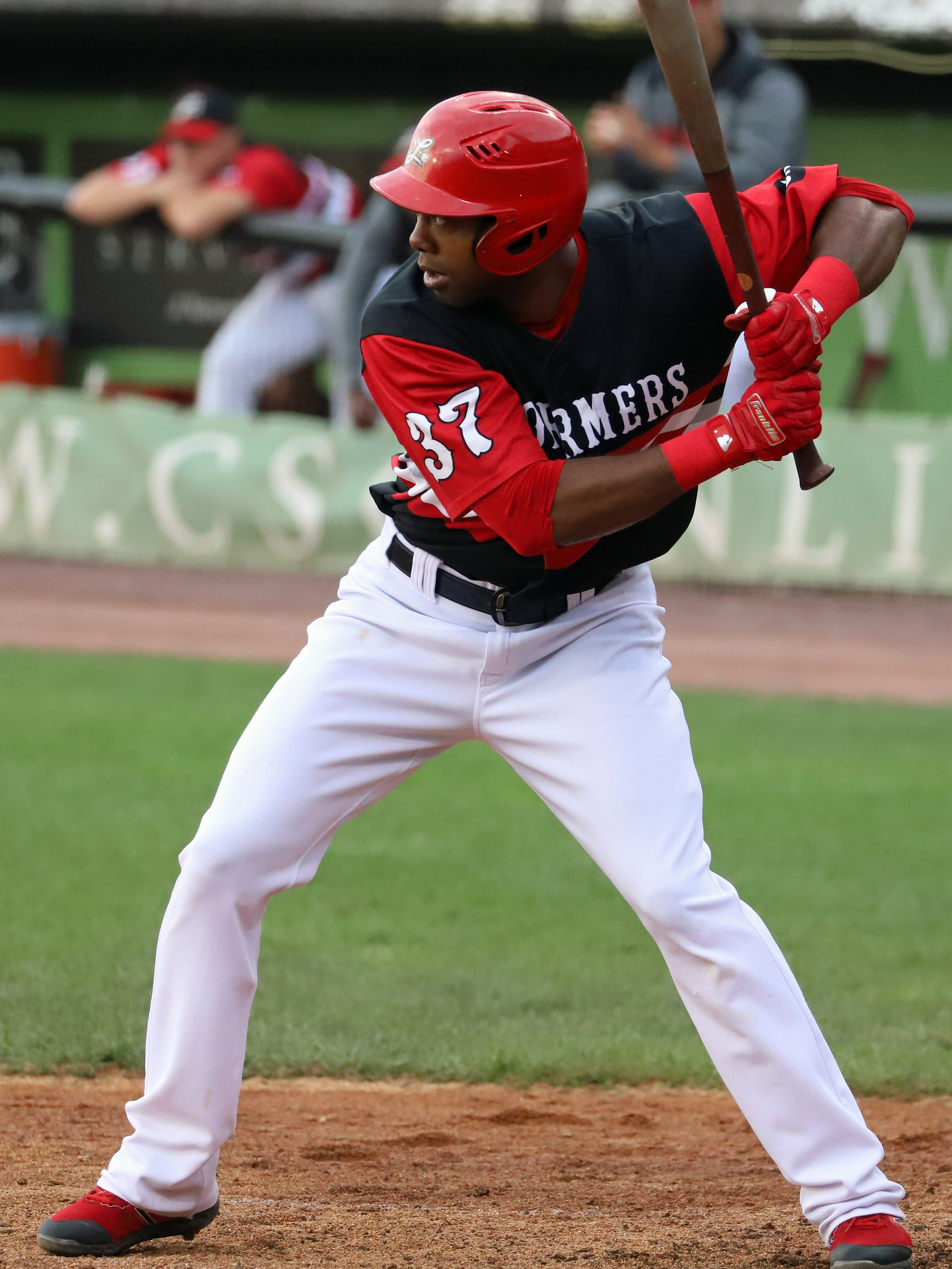
- De Aza with the Lancaster Barnstormers in 2021

Southern Maryland Blue Crabs – No. 24
- Outfielder
- Born: April 11, 1984 (age 42); Guaymate, Dominican Republic
- Bats: Left Throws: Left

MLB debut
- April 2, 2007, for the Florida Marlins

MLB statistics (through 2017 season)
- Batting average: .260
- Home runs: 51
- Runs batted in: 258
- Stats at Baseball Reference

Teams
- Florida Marlins (2007, 2009); Chicago White Sox (2010–2014); Baltimore Orioles (2014–2015); Boston Red Sox (2015); San Francisco Giants (2015); New York Mets (2016); Washington Nationals (2017)
Medals
Men's baseball
Representing Dominican Republic
World Baseball Classic
Gold medal – first place	2013 San Francisco	Team

Alejandro Alberto De Aza Ceda (born April 11, 1984) is a Dominican professional baseball outfielder for the Southern Maryland Blue Crabs of Atlantic League of Professional Baseball. He has previously played in Major League Baseball (MLB) for the Florida Marlins, Chicago White Sox, Baltimore Orioles, Boston Red Sox, San Francisco Giants, New York Mets, and Washington Nationals.

In 2013, De Aza played for the 2013 World Baseball Classic-winning team from the Dominican Republic, having a .208 batting average and three RBI in eight games as a center fielder, going 1-for-3 in the final game against Puerto Rico.

== Professional career ==
=== Los Angeles Dodgers ===
De Aza was originally signed by the Los Angeles Dodgers as a non-drafted free agent on May 1, 2001. After playing in the Dodgers organization from the 2001 seasons to the 2004 seasons, the Florida Marlins selected him from the minor league phase of the Rule 5 draft in 2004.

=== Florida Marlins ===
In 2005, De Aza batted .286 with 34 stolen bases and 75 runs scored while playing for the Jupiter Hammerheads of the High–A Florida State League. In 2006, De Aza batted .278 with 12 doubles, two triples, two home runs, 16 RBI and 27 stolen bases at the Double-A Carolina Mudcats.

On March 28, 2007, De Aza was named the starting center fielder for the Marlins, beating out Reggie Abercrombie, Eric Reed, and Alex Sánchez in what was seen as a surprise. In 2007, he batted .303 (10-for-33) in nine games for the Marlins before going on the disabled list on April 16 with a right ankle sprain; an MRI in mid-May revealed that his ankle had a hairline fracture. The fractured ankle required surgery and De Aza was placed on the disabled list for the 2007 season. De Aza was called up by the Florida Marlins in May 2009.

=== Chicago White Sox ===
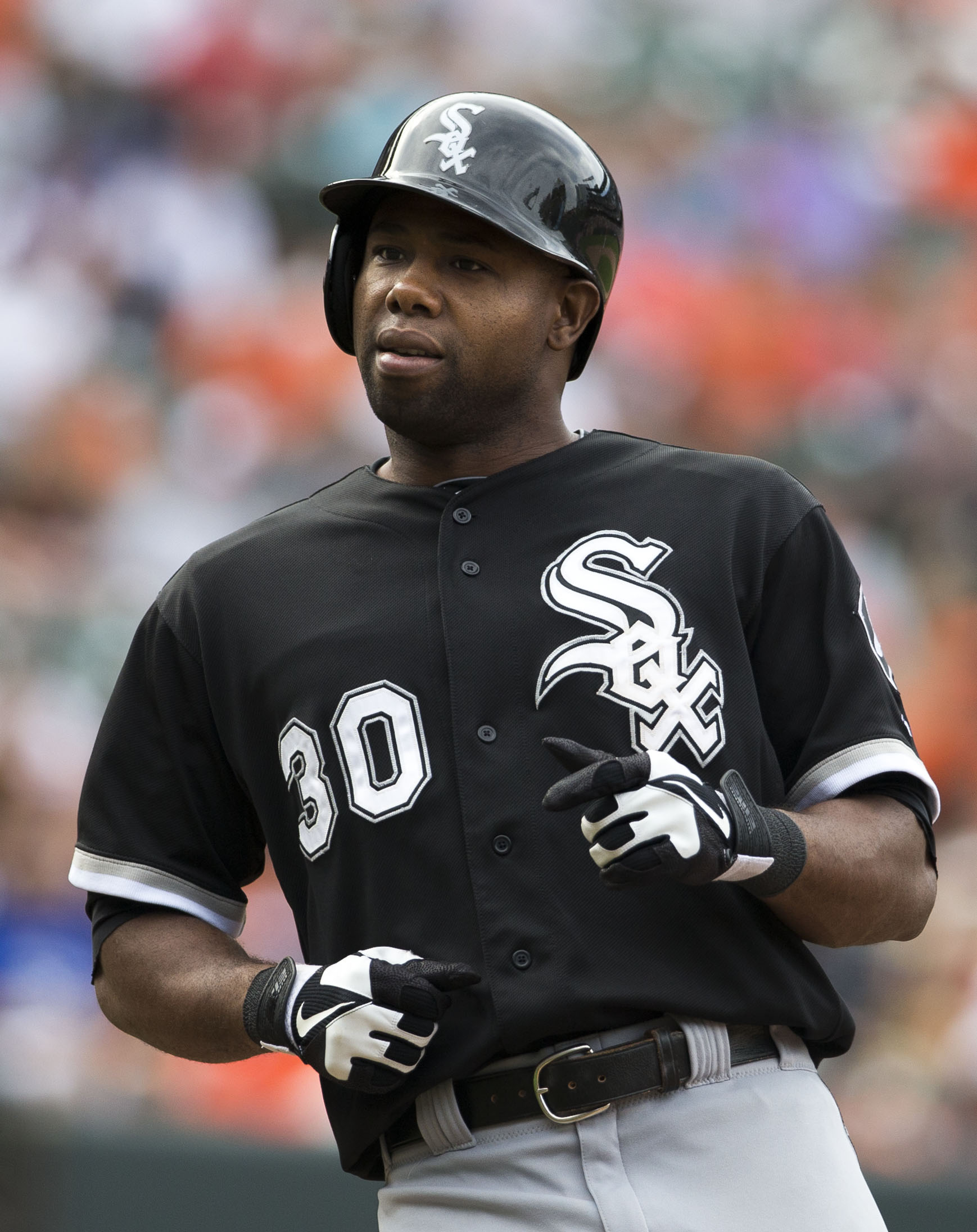
De Aza with the Chicago White Sox in 2013

On October 21, 2009, the Chicago White Sox claimed De Aza off waivers from the Marlins. On July 27, 2011, he hit the first home run of his MLB career, off Detroit Tigers pitcher Max Scherzer.

On January 18, 2013, De Aza signed a one-year, $2.075 million deal to avoid arbitration with the White Sox. De Aza was the starting center fielder once again, and his main backups were Jordan Danks and DeWayne Wise. He would also periodically fill in at left field when Dayán Viciedo would be injured. In 153 games, he hit .264/.323/.405 with 17 home runs, 62 RBI and 20 stolen bases.

On March 31, 2014, De Aza recorded his first career multi-home run game in an Opening Day win over the Minnesota Twins.

=== Baltimore Orioles ===
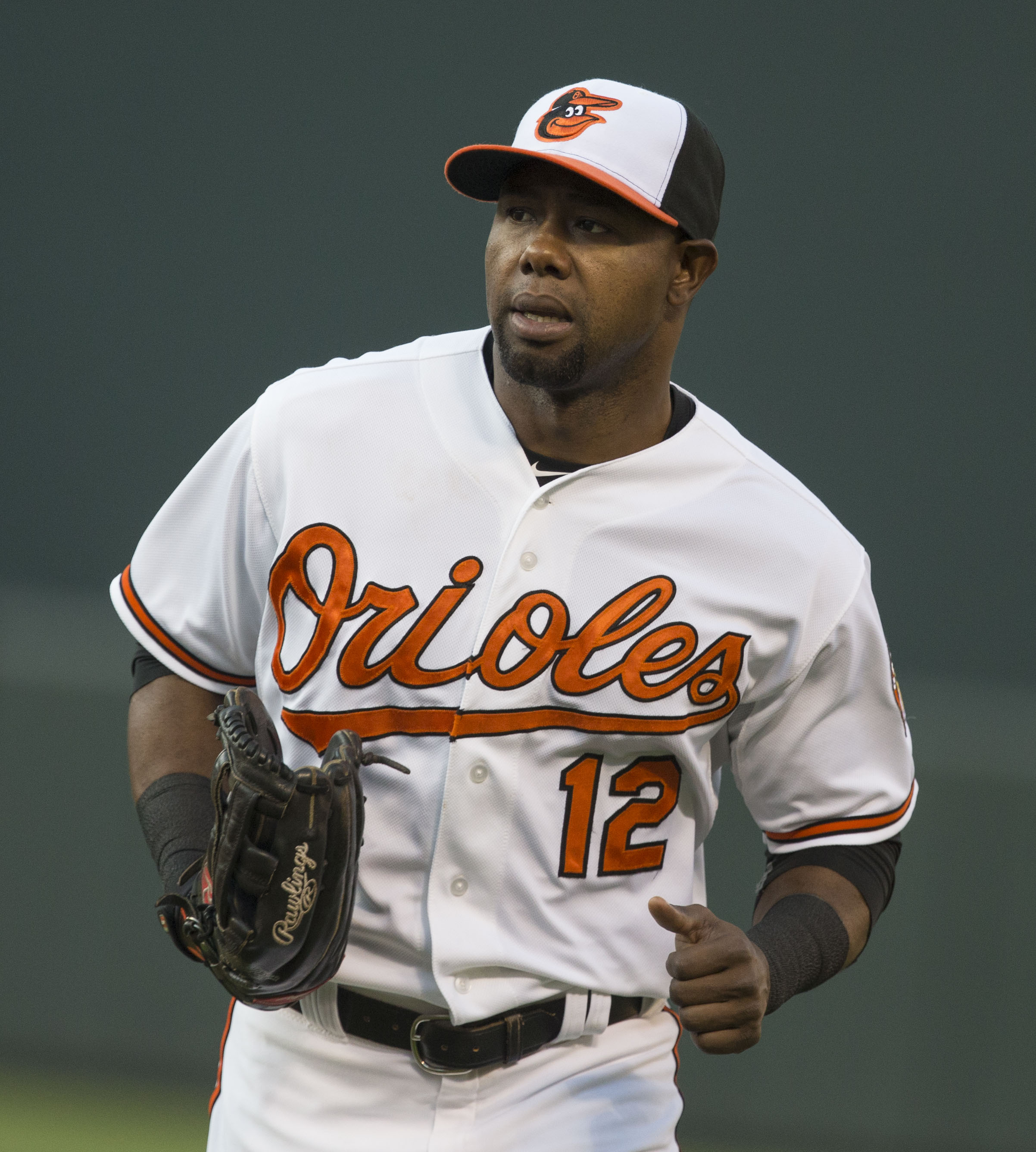
De Aza with the Baltimore Orioles in 2015

On August 30, 2014, De Aza was traded from the White Sox to the Baltimore Orioles in exchange for minor league pitchers Miguel Chalas and Mark Blackmar. In his first five games with the Orioles, De Aza hit two home runs, had three RBI, stole a base, scored four runs and batted .400. He was designated for assignment on May 27, 2015.

=== Boston Red Sox ===
On June 3, 2015, De Aza was traded to the Boston Red Sox in exchange for cash considerations and prospect Joe Gunkel. In 60 appearances for Boston, De Aza batted .292/.347/.484 with four home runs, 25 RBI, and three stolen bases.

=== San Francisco Giants ===
On August 31, 2015, De Aza was traded to the San Francisco Giants with cash considerations for minor league pitcher Luis Ysla. He made 24 appearances down the stretch for San Francisco, hitting .262/.387/.361 with three RBI and two stolen bases.

=== New York Mets ===
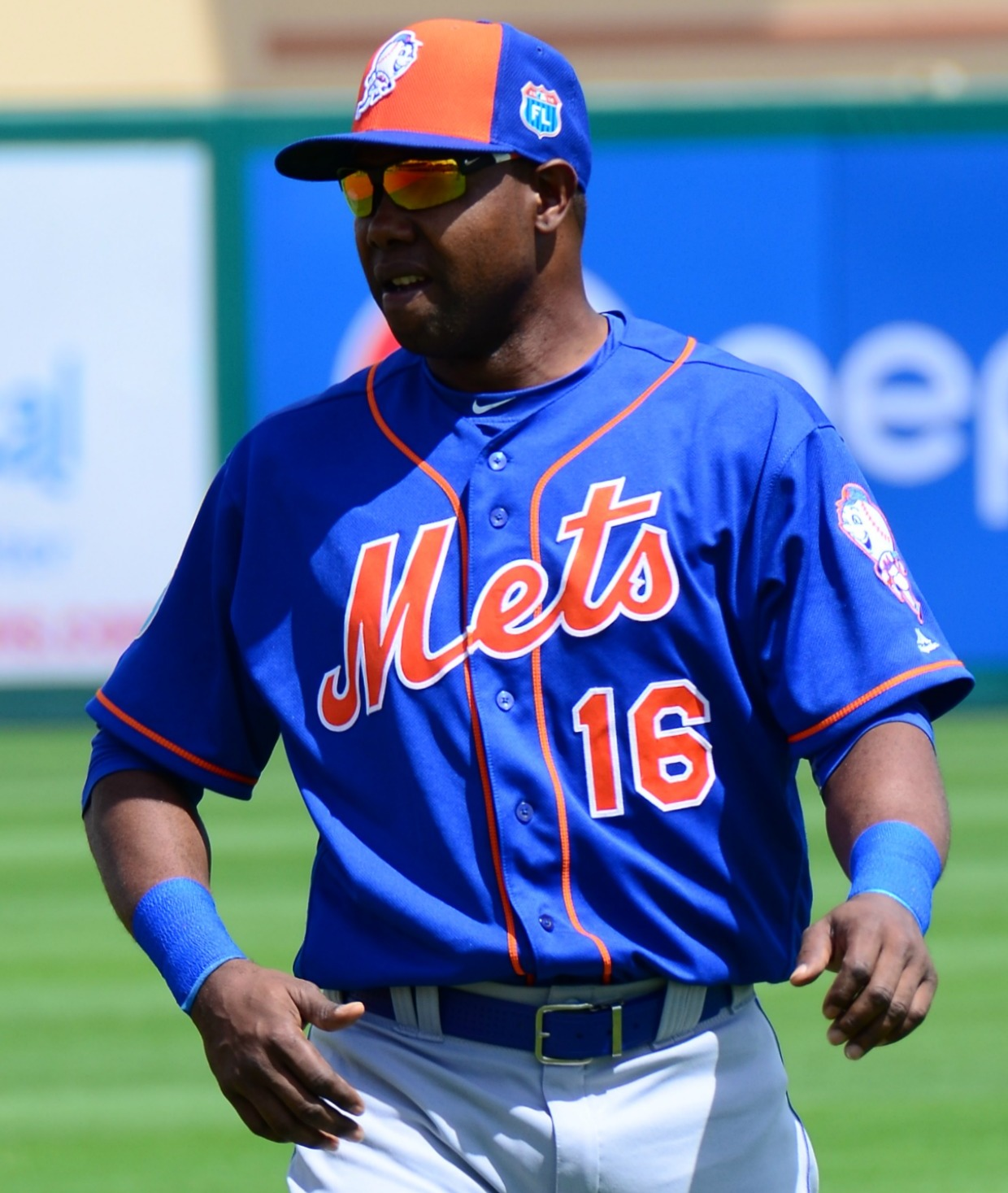
De Aza with the Mets in Spring Training

On December 23, 2015, De Aza signed a one-year, $5.75 million contract with the New York Mets.

In 2016, De Aza batted a career-low .205 in 130 games, and had a .297 on-base percentage, which was his lowest since his rookie season of 2007, and his .321 slugging percentage was his lowest since 2009. His average of a strikeout per every 3.99 plate appearances was the worst of his career. He did not have an assist in 76 games in the outfield, which were third most among NL outfielders without any assists.

=== Washington Nationals ===
On January 20, 2017, De Aza signed a minor league contract with the Oakland Athletics. He opted out of the contract near the end of spring training and became a free agent.

On June 14, 2017, De Aza signed a minor league contract with the Washington Nationals. De Aza appeared in his first game for the Nationals on August 16. He re-signed with the Nationals on another minor league contract on March 2, 2018, and was released on March 24. He was re-signed on March 26, to the same terms of his original minor league deal. De Aza was later released from the organization on August 8.

=== New Britain Bees ===
On April 16, 2019, De Aza signed with the New Britain Bees of the Atlantic League of Professional Baseball. De Aza made 69 appearances for New Britain, slashing .346/.413/.513 with six home runs, 42 RBI, and four stolen bases.

=== Minnesota Twins ===
On July 17, 2019, De Aza had his contract purchased by the Minnesota Twins. In 35 games for the Triple–A Rochester Red Wings, he batted .352/.432/.609 with six home runs, 31 RBI, and four stolen bases. De Aza elected free agency following the season on November 4.

=== Lancaster Barnstormers ===
On November 5, 2019, De Aza re-signed with the New Britain Bees of the Atlantic League of Professional Baseball. However, following the Bees' move to the Futures Collegiate Baseball League, he was drafted by the Lancaster Barnstormers in the Bees dispersal draft. De Aza did not play in a game in 2020 due to the cancellation of the ALPB season because of the COVID-19 pandemic. On June 5, 2021, De Aza re-signed with the Barnstormers. He became a free agent following the season.

=== Long Island Ducks ===
On May 10, 2022, De Aza signed with the Long Island Ducks of the Atlantic League of Professional Baseball. In 109 games he slashed .343/.452/.516 with 10 home runs and 68 RBI. Following the regular season, De Aza was named an Atlantic League All-Star. He became a free agent following the season.

On June 7, 2023, De Aza re–signed with the Ducks. In 79 games for Long Island, he slashed .298/.390/.397 with 4 home runs and 49 RBI. De Aza elected free agency following the season.

=== Staten Island FerryHawks ===
On June 14, 2024, De Aza signed with the Staten Island FerryHawks of the Atlantic League of Professional Baseball. In 68 appearances for the FerryHawks, he batted .269/.357/.416 with seven home runs, 40 RBI, and five stolen bases. De Aza became a free agent following the season.

=== Southern Maryland Blue Crabs ===
On April 24, 2025, De Aza signed with the Southern Maryland Blue Crabs of the Atlantic League of Professional Baseball. He made 101 appearances for Southern Maryland, batting .253/.356/.423 with 12 home runs, 67 RBI, and 11 stolen bases.

== See also ==
- Rule 5 draft results
