= Baseball United Arab Classic =

International baseball tournament

Tournament details
- Country: United Arab Emirates
- City: Dubai
- Dates: November 7–10, 2024
- Teams: 9

Final positions
- Champions: Pakistan
- Runners-up: United Arab Emirates

Tournament statistics
- Games played: 21

Awards
- MVP: (Pakistan) Muhammad Hussain

The Baseball United Arab Classic was an international baseball tournament that took place between November 7 and November 10, 2024. Organized by Baseball United, the invitational tournament was held in Dubai, United Arab Emirates, at the Baseball United Ballpark at The Sevens sports complex. The tournament operated under World Baseball Classic rules. It featured the international debut of the Saudi Arabia national team and the United Arab Emirates national team.

== Background ==
A similar tournament, the Dubai Cup, was organized by the World Baseball Softball Confederation in December 2017 between Pakistan and India. Pakistan won the final game, played at Sharjah Cricket Stadium, 11–2.

== Group stage ==
=== Group A ===
Pos	Team	Pld	W	L	RF	RA	RD	PCT	GB
1	Pakistan	4	4	0	49	6	+43	1.000	—
2	United Arab Emirates (H)	4	3	1	34	13	+21	.750	1
3	India	4	2	2	21	21	0	.500	2
4	Bangladesh	4	1	3	15	28	−13	.250	3
5	Afghanistan	4	0	4	4	55	−51	.000	4

Source: Baseball United
(H) Hosts

7 November 2024; 8:00 (UTC+4)	Afghanistan	1–11	India	The Sevens, Dubai

7 November 2024; 10:30 (UTC+4)	Bangladesh	0–10	Pakistan	The Sevens, Dubai

7 November 2024; 13:00 (UTC+4)	India	1–7	United Arab Emirates	The Sevens, Dubai

7 November 2024; 20:30 (UTC+4)	United Arab Emirates	3–10	Pakistan	The Sevens, Dubai

8 November 2024; 8:00 (UTC+4)	Bangladesh	12–0	Afghanistan	The Sevens, Dubai

8 November 2024; 14:00 (UTC+4)	Afghanistan	0–15	United Arab Emirates	The Sevens, Dubai

8 November 2024; 20:00 (UTC+4)	Pakistan	12–0	India	The Sevens, Dubai

9 November 2024; 11:00 (UTC+4)	United Arab Emirates	9–2	Bangladesh	The Sevens, Dubai

9 November 2024; 14:00 (UTC+4)	Pakistan	17–3	Afghanistan	The Sevens, Dubai

9 November 2024; 20:00 (UTC+4)	India	9–1	Bangladesh	The Sevens, Dubai

=== Group B ===
Pos	Team	Pld	W	L	RF	RA	RD	PCT	GB
1	Palestine	3	3	0	37	11	+26	1.000	—
2	Sri Lanka	3	2	1	32	14	+18	.667	1
3	Saudi Arabia	3	1	2	22	29	−7	.333	2
4	Nepal	3	0	3	4	41	−37	.000	3

Source: Baseball United

7 November 2024; 15:30 (UTC+4)	Sri Lanka	15–6	Saudi Arabia	The Sevens, Dubai

7 November 2024; 18:00 (UTC+4)	Nepal	2–17	Palestine	The Sevens, Dubai

8 November 2024; 11:00 (UTC+4)	Saudi Arabia	14–2	Nepal	The Sevens, Dubai

8 November 2024; 17:00 (UTC+4)	Palestine	8–7	Sri Lanka	The Sevens, Dubai

9 November 2024; 8:00 (UTC+4)	Nepal	0–10	Sri Lanka	The Sevens, Dubai

9 November 2024; 17:00 (UTC+4)	Saudi Arabia	2–12	Palestine	The Sevens, Dubai

== Knockout stage ==
Quarterfinals
India	0
Sri Lanka	1
Saudi Arabia	1
United Arab Emirates	9

Semifinals
Sri Lanka	0
Pakistan	3
United Arab Emirates	6
Palestine	1

Finals
Pakistan	12
United Arab Emirates	1

== Final standings ==
Rk	Team	W	L
1st place, gold medalist(s)	Pakistan	6	0
2nd place, silver medalist(s)	United Arab Emirates	5	2
Eliminated in Semifinals
3	Palestine	3	1
4	Sri Lanka	3	2
Eliminated in Quarterfinals
5	India	2	3
6	Saudi Arabia	1	3
Eliminated in Group stage
7	Bangladesh	1	3
8	Nepal	0	3
9	Afghanistan	0	4

== Honors and awards ==
=== All-Star team ===
Position	Player
C	(Bangladesh) Shahid Ahmed
1B	(Saudi Arabia) Gareth Grundlignh
2B	(Palestine) Syam Lafi
3B	(Pakistan) Muhammad Hussain
SS	(United Arab Emirates) Chris Beyers (Pakistan) Zan Shariff
LF	(Palestine) Dylan Ahmed
CF	(Sri Lanka) Sameera Rathnayake
RF	(United Arab Emirates) Lorenzo Riddle (Pakistan) Moosa Nonomiya
DH	(United Arab Emirates) Gabriel Reque
P	(Pakistan) Aslam Muhammad

=== Most Valuable Player ===
Award	Player	Ref.
Most Valuable Player	(Pakistan) Muhammad Hussain	

== See also ==
- West Asia Baseball Cup
- WBSC Asia
