= Jackson Melián =

Venezuelan baseball player

- Outfielder
- Born: January 7, 1980 (age 45); Barcelona, Venezuela
- Bats: Right Throws: Right

Jackson Melián (born January 7, 1980) is a Venezuelan professional baseball outfielder. Considered a top prospect, Melián received a record signing bonus for a Latin American player from the New York Yankees of Major League Baseball (MLB) when he was 16 years old. He played in Minor League Baseball, but did not play in the major leagues.

== Career ==
Melián, represented by Scott Boras, signed as an international free agent with the New York Yankees in 1996, receiving a $1.6 million signing bonus. At the time, it was a record bonus for a Latin American prospect. He was rated by Baseball America as a Top 100 prospect four times: in 1997 (#40), 1998 (#98), 1999 (#72) and 2000 (#72).

In 1997, Melián batted .263 with three home runs and 36 runs batted in (RBIs) for the Gulf Coast Yankees of the Rookie-level Gulf Coast League in 1997. Melián played for the Greensboro Bats of the Class A South Atlantic League in 1998. He batted .255 with eight home runs and 45 RBIs. Playing for the Tampa Yankees of the Class A-Advanced Florida State League in 1999, Melián batted .283 with six home runs, 61 RBIs, and 11 stolen bases. He also decreased his strikeouts from 120 to 98. In 2000, the Yankees assigned him to the Norwich Navigators of the Class AA Eastern League. He batted .252 with 69 strikeouts in 290 at bats. Melián was selected to play in the 2000 All-Star Futures Game.

In July 2000, the Yankees traded Melián, Drew Henson, Ed Yarnall, and Brian Reith to the Cincinnati Reds for Denny Neagle and Mike Frank. He spent the remainder of the 2000 season and all of the 2001 season with the Chattanooga Lookouts of the Class AA Southern League. In 2001, he batted .231 with 16 home runs and 52 RBIs in 120 games. Prior to the 2002 season, the Milwaukee Brewers claimed Melián off of waivers from the Reds. On June 9, 2002, the Brewers traded Melián to the Chicago Cubs for Robert Machado. He played for the West Tenn Diamond Jaxx of the Southern League and Iowa Cubs of the Class AAA Pacific Coast League (PCL) in 2002 and 2003. He signed with the Yankees as a minor league free agent prior to the 2004 season, but was traded to the Atlanta Braves on June 24. He joined the Detroit Tigers' organization in 2006, playing for the Erie SeaWolves of the Class AA Eastern League. In 2008, he played for the Round Rock Express of the PCL in the Houston Astros' organization.

In 2014, Melián returned to Venezuela where played for Caribes de Anzoátegui winning 3–2 against Tiburones de La Guaira.

== Personal ==
Melián's father, Vincent Melián, was a long-time scout for the Atlanta Braves and a lifelong fan of the Yankees. He named Melián after Reggie Jackson. His older brother, Jonathan, played in Minor League Baseball for the Seattle Mariners organization for three seasons.

On August 27, 1998, Melián's parents were killed in a car accident while following their son's team bus in Hickory, North Carolina.

Melián considered pursuing an Olympic swimming career, instead opting to play baseball. When he was 13 years old, he set Venezuelan and Central American records with a time of 24 seconds in the 50 metre freestyle. He could have competed for a spot in the 2000 Summer Olympics, but chose not to move to another city to train.
